= Lisserbroek =

- Village
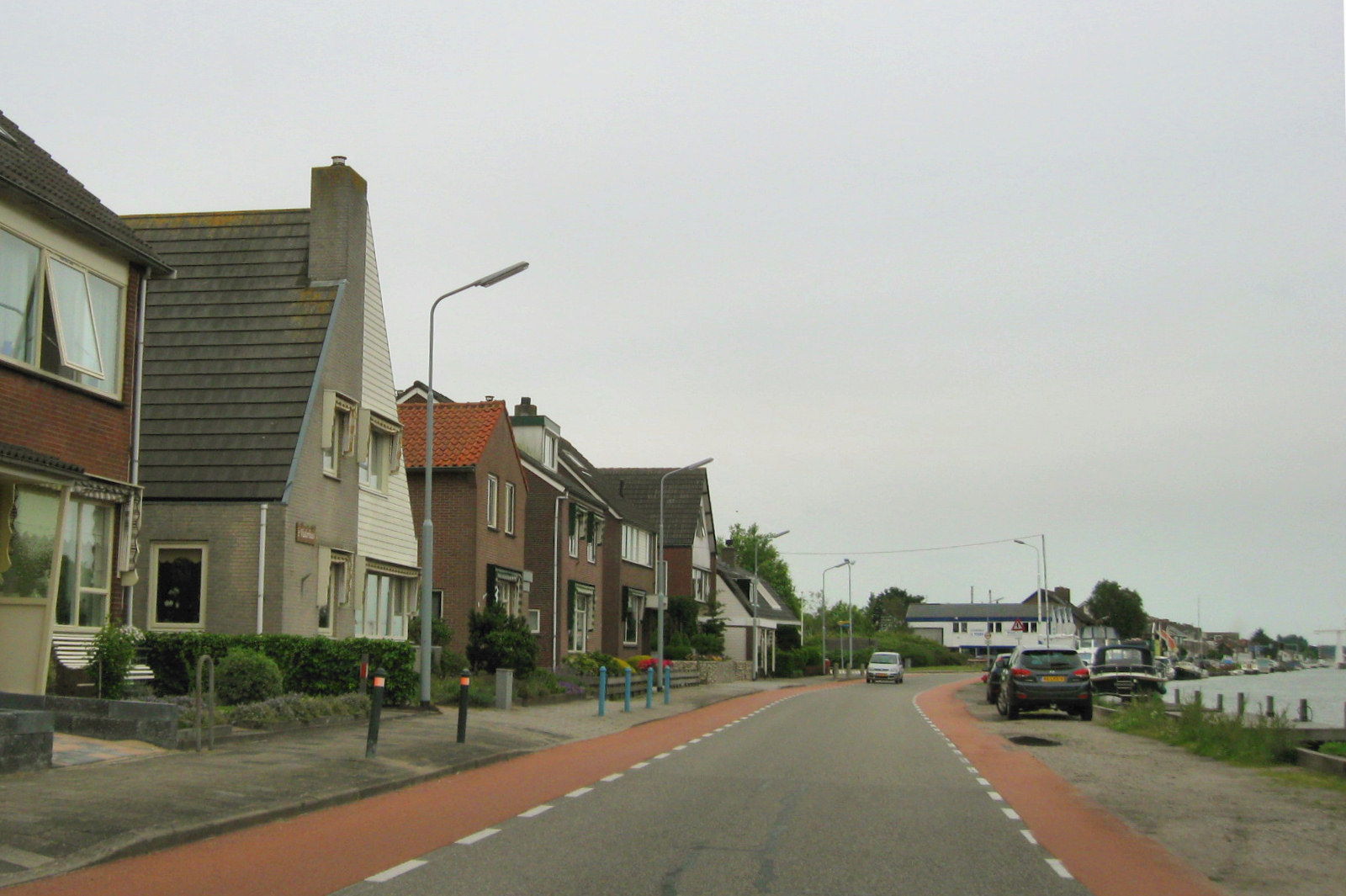

- Location in the Netherlands Location in the province of North Holland in the Netherlands
- Coordinates: 52°15′N 4°34′E
- Country: Netherlands
- Province: North Holland
- Municipality: Haarlemmermeer

Area
  - Total: 5.92 km^{2} (2.29 sq mi)
- Elevation: −1.9 m (−6.2 ft)

Population (2021)
  - Total: 3,435
  - Density: 580/km^{2} (1,500/sq mi)
- Time zone: UTC+1 (CET)
  - Summer (DST): UTC+2 (CEST)
- Postal code: 2165
- Dialing code: 0252

Lisserbroek is a village in the Dutch province of North Holland. It is a part of the municipality of Haarlemmermeer, and lies about 10 km southwest of Hoofddorp. It is located along the Ringvaart opposite the town of Lisse in the area called the "Dune and Bulb Region" (Duin- en Bollenstreek).

The village was first mentioned between 1280 and 1287 as "lisse inden broke", and means "swampy land near Lisse.

== Gallery ==
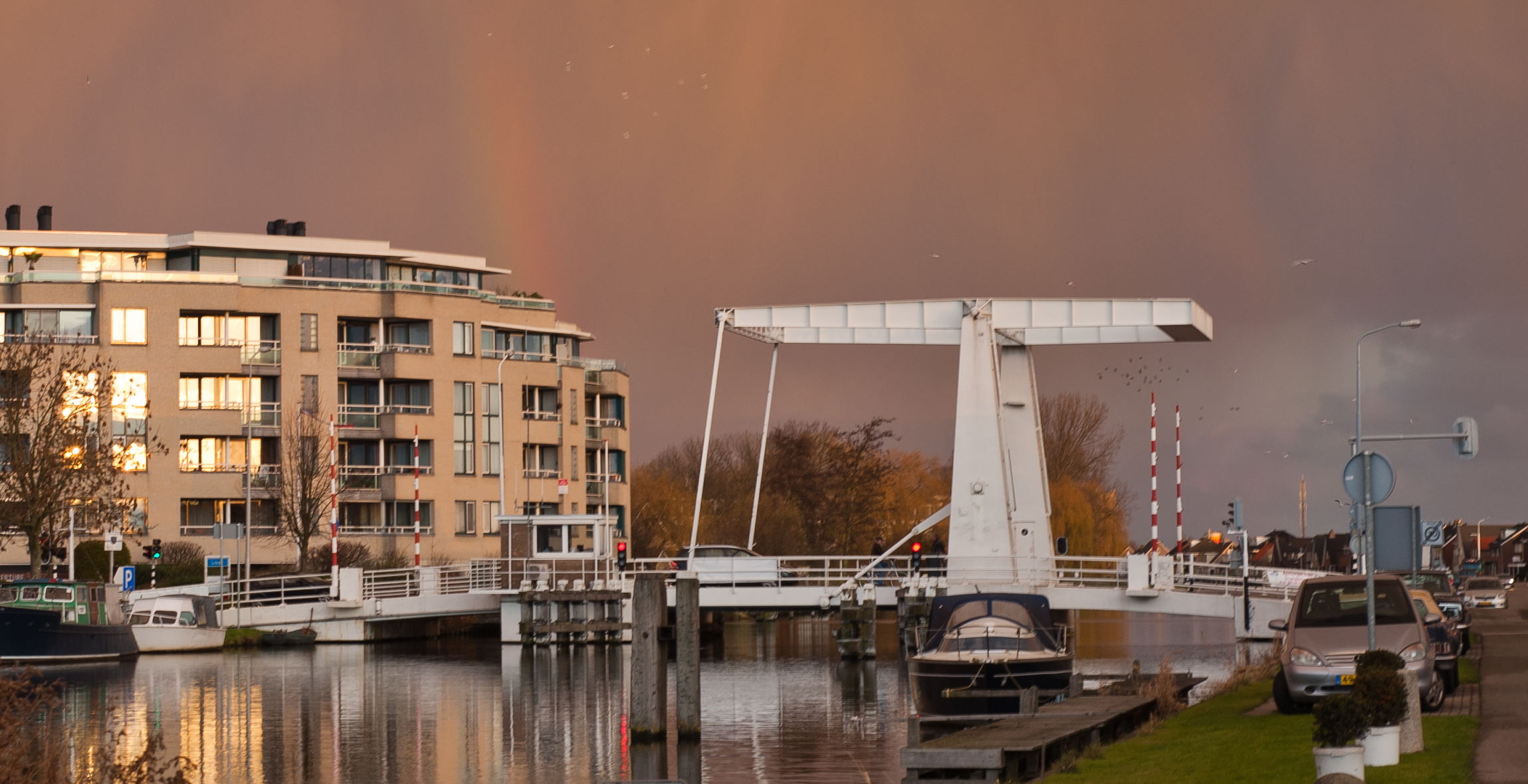
Night view of the bridge in Lisserbroek
