= Bloemencorso Bollenstreek =

Bloemencorso Bollenstreek is a flower parade in the Netherlands and one of the largest in the world. The event takes place in mid-April. The route starts on Friday evening in Noordwijk and ends in the city of Haarlem the day after.

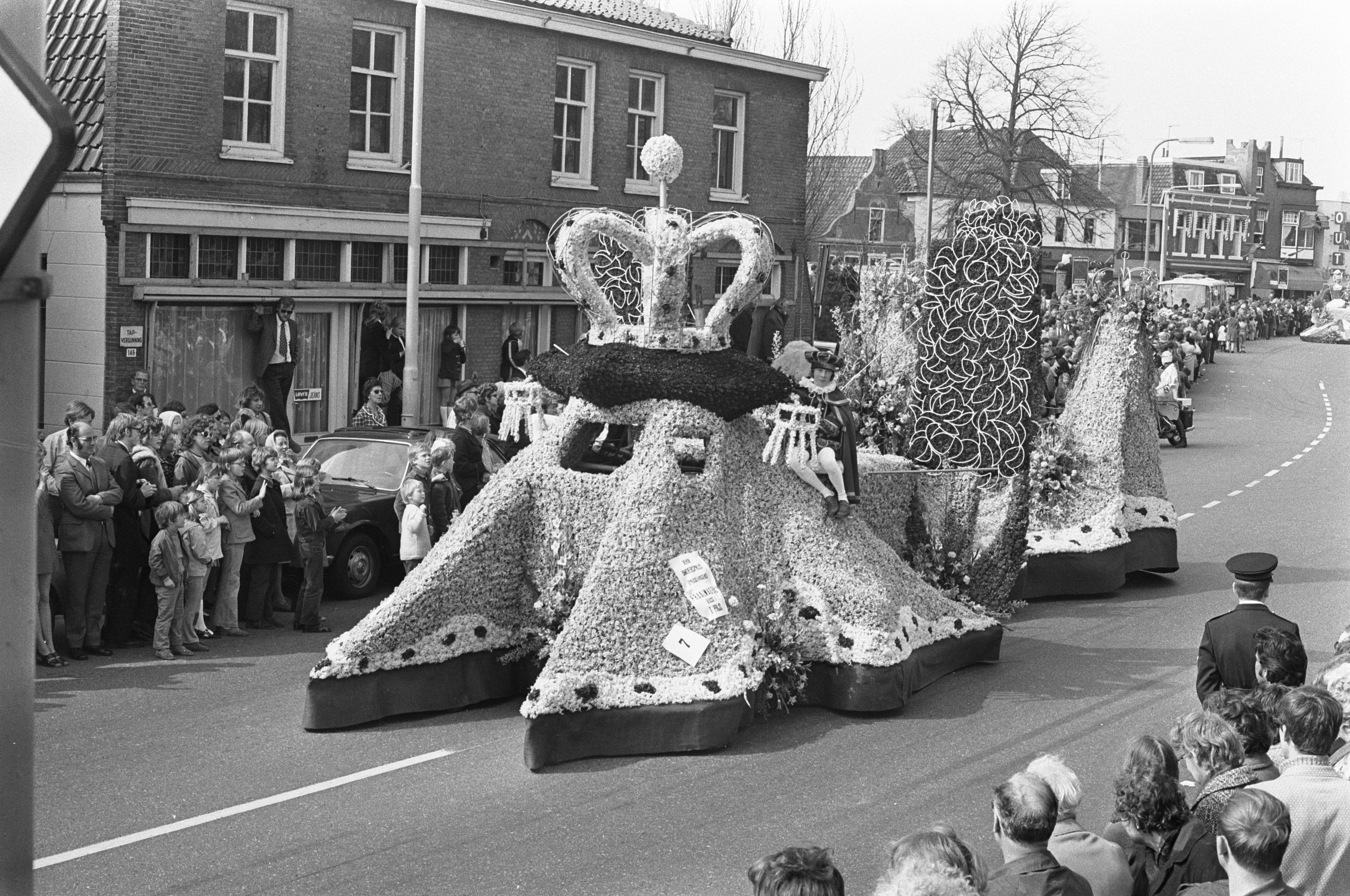
1972 edition

== History ==
The event originated just after World War II. When the war was over, there was seen to be a need for parties and socializing, and parades were organized. The procession consisted then of a couple with flower garlands and flower lingers, decorated trucks and handcarts. The local band preceded.

The first flower parade of the bulb region dates back to the year 1947, while it was Willem Warmenhoven, an amaryllis grower from Hillegom, who was the creator of the first adult float in the shape of a whale. On a rickety form a small truck was built and were concealed hyacinths. Hillegom invited Sassenheim and Lisse to cooperate this event, this was set at a large-scale parade and a small corsocomité. The spring parade is closely linked to the spring flower exhibition Keukenhof.

== Route ==
Before the Parade Saturday, the procession draws on Friday Night through the village Noordwijkerhout with a light show. When the route starts in the morning of Saturday, it proceeds as follows: Noordwijk – Voorhout – Sassenheim – Lisse – Hillegom – Bennebroek – Heemstede – Haarlem.

== Gallery ==
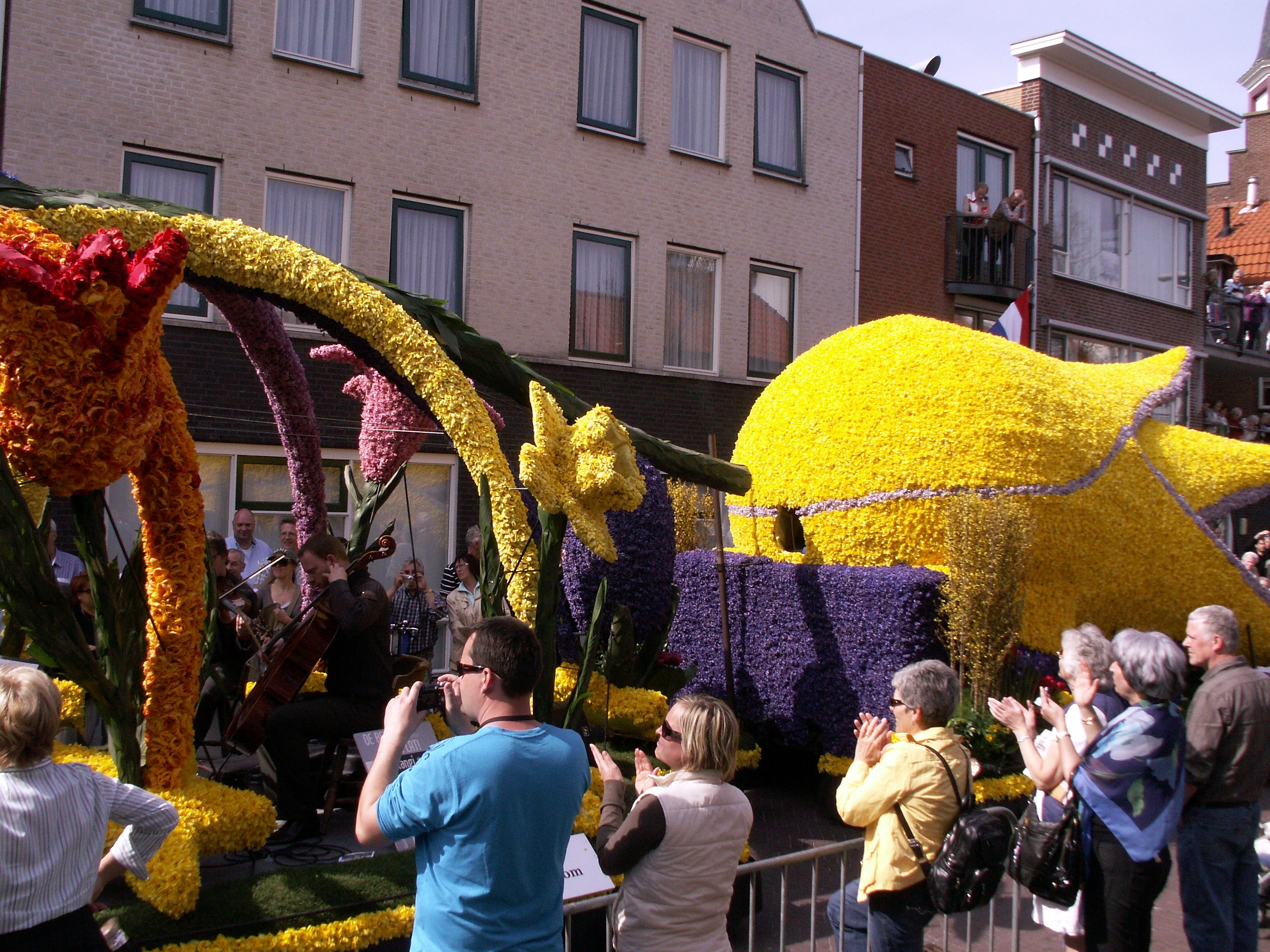
A yellow bulb flower

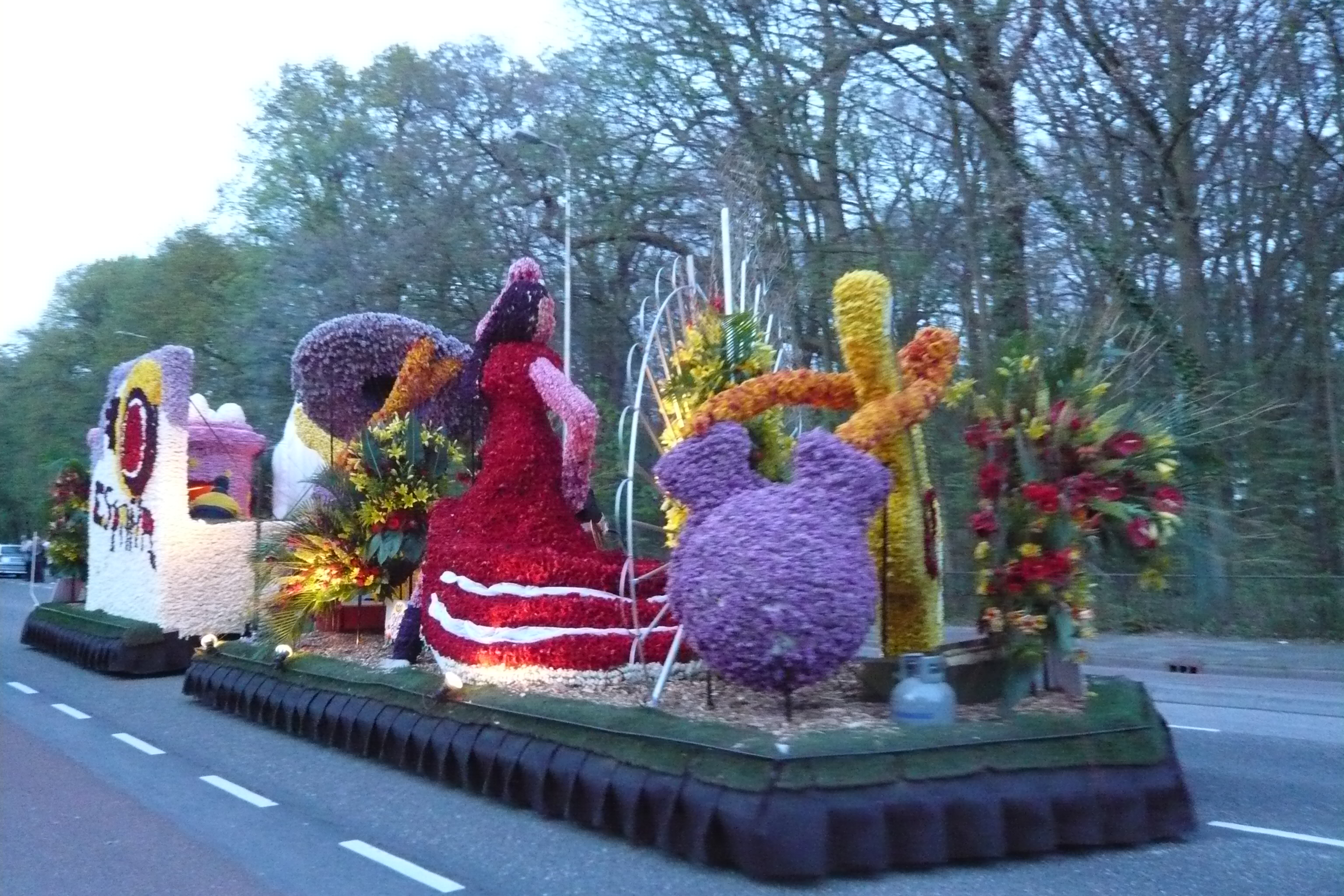
Another creative flower work

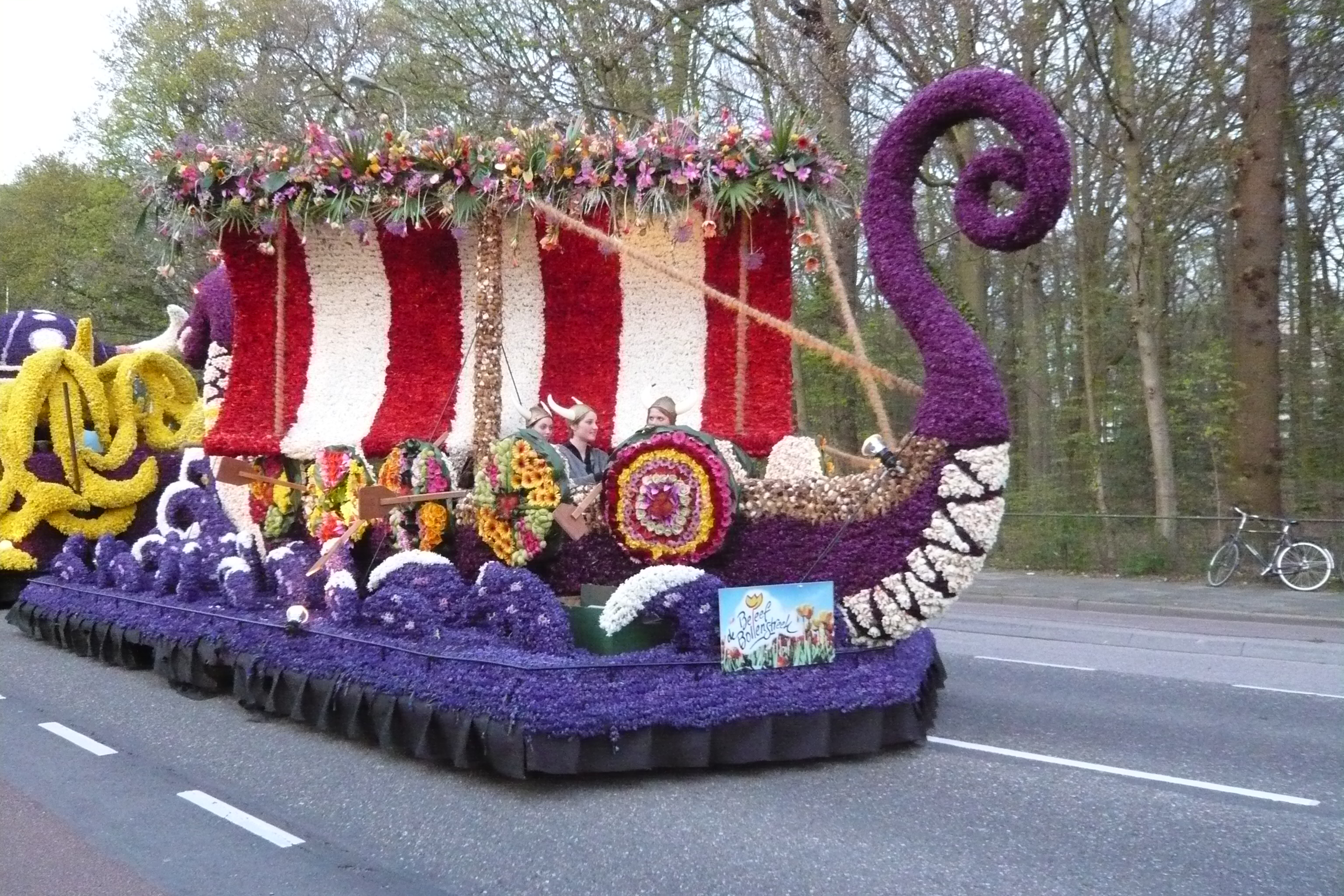
A Purple Viking ship

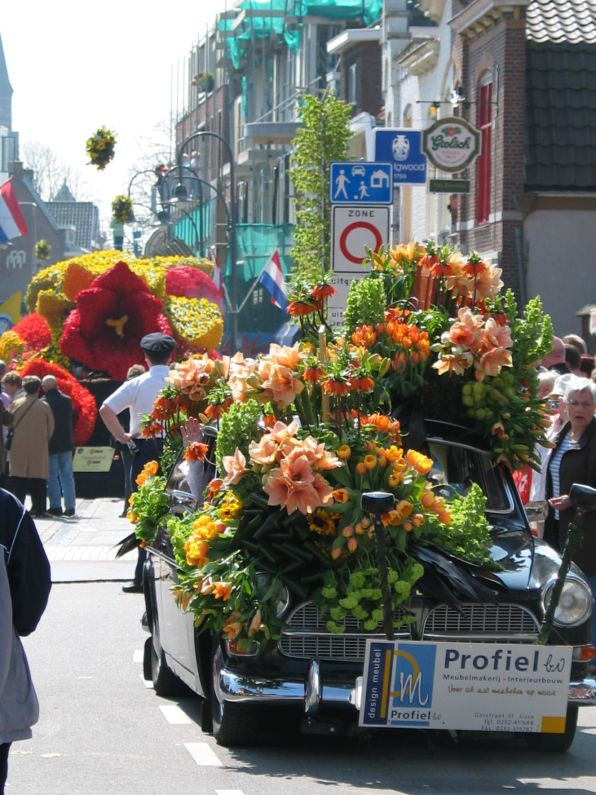
Bollenstreek Bloemencorso 2005 edition

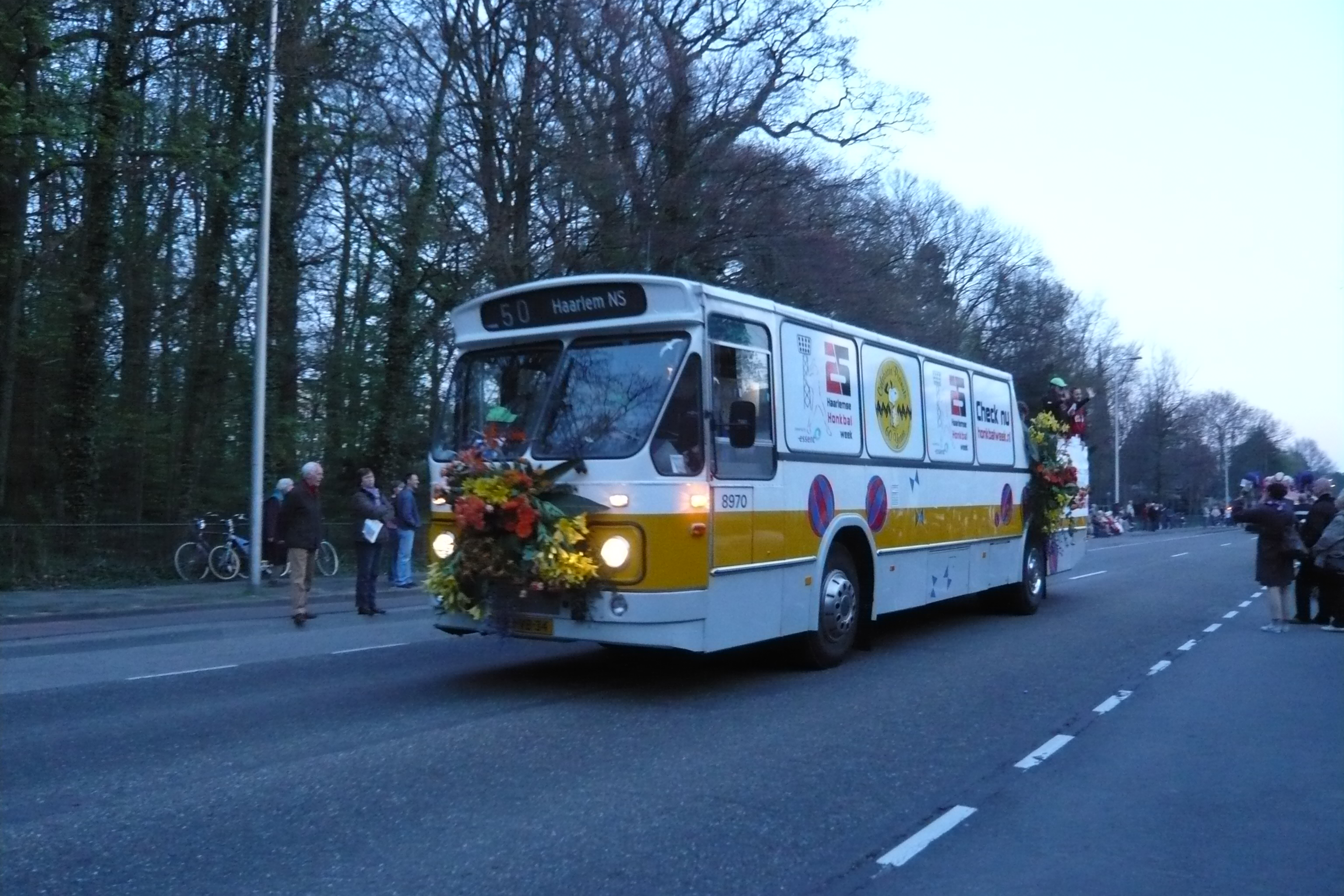
Old bus with flowers

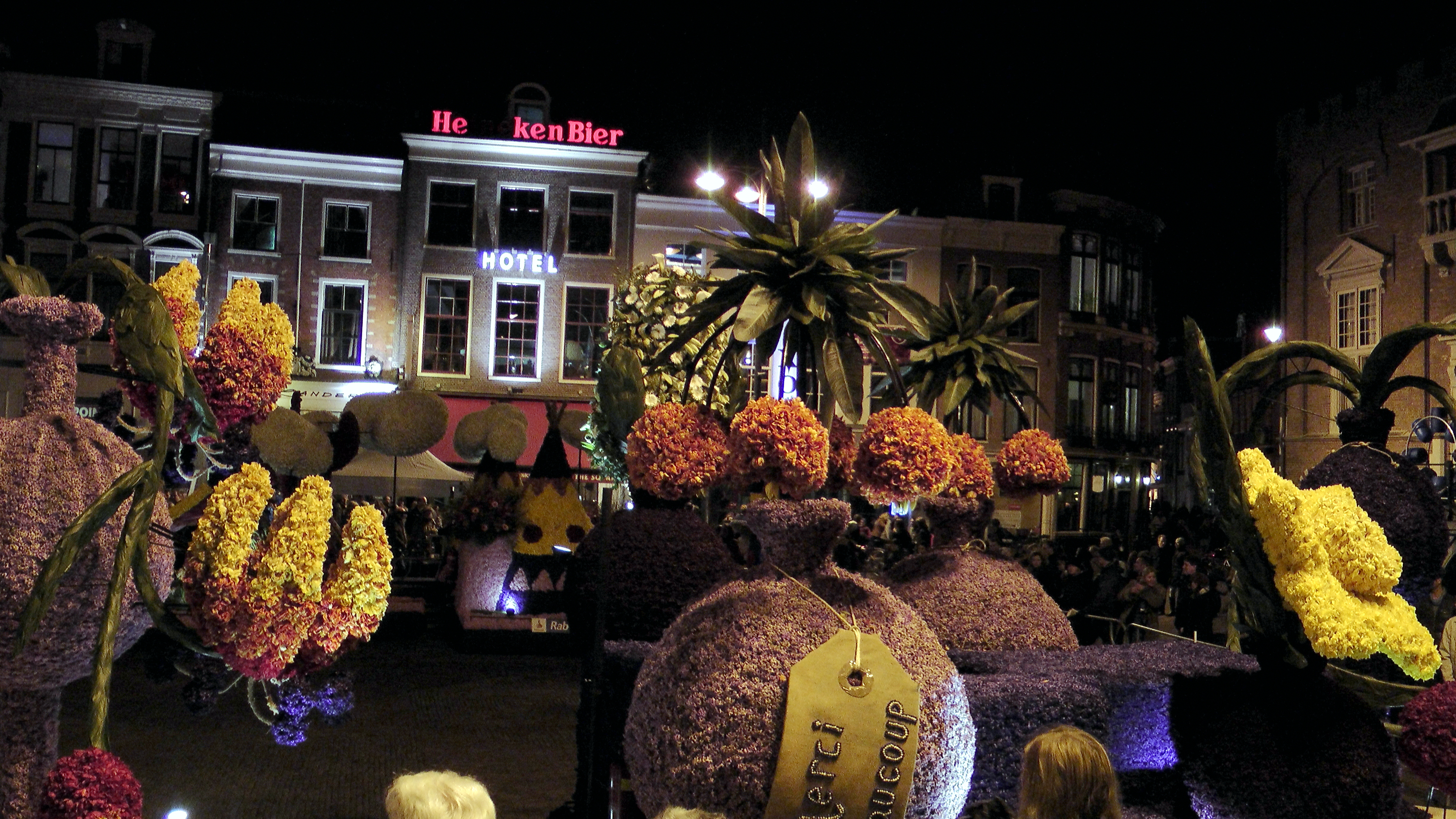
A Palm theme in Haarlem

== See also ==
- Bloemencorso Vollenhove
- Bloemencorso Zundert
