= Bloemencorso Zundert =

Festivity

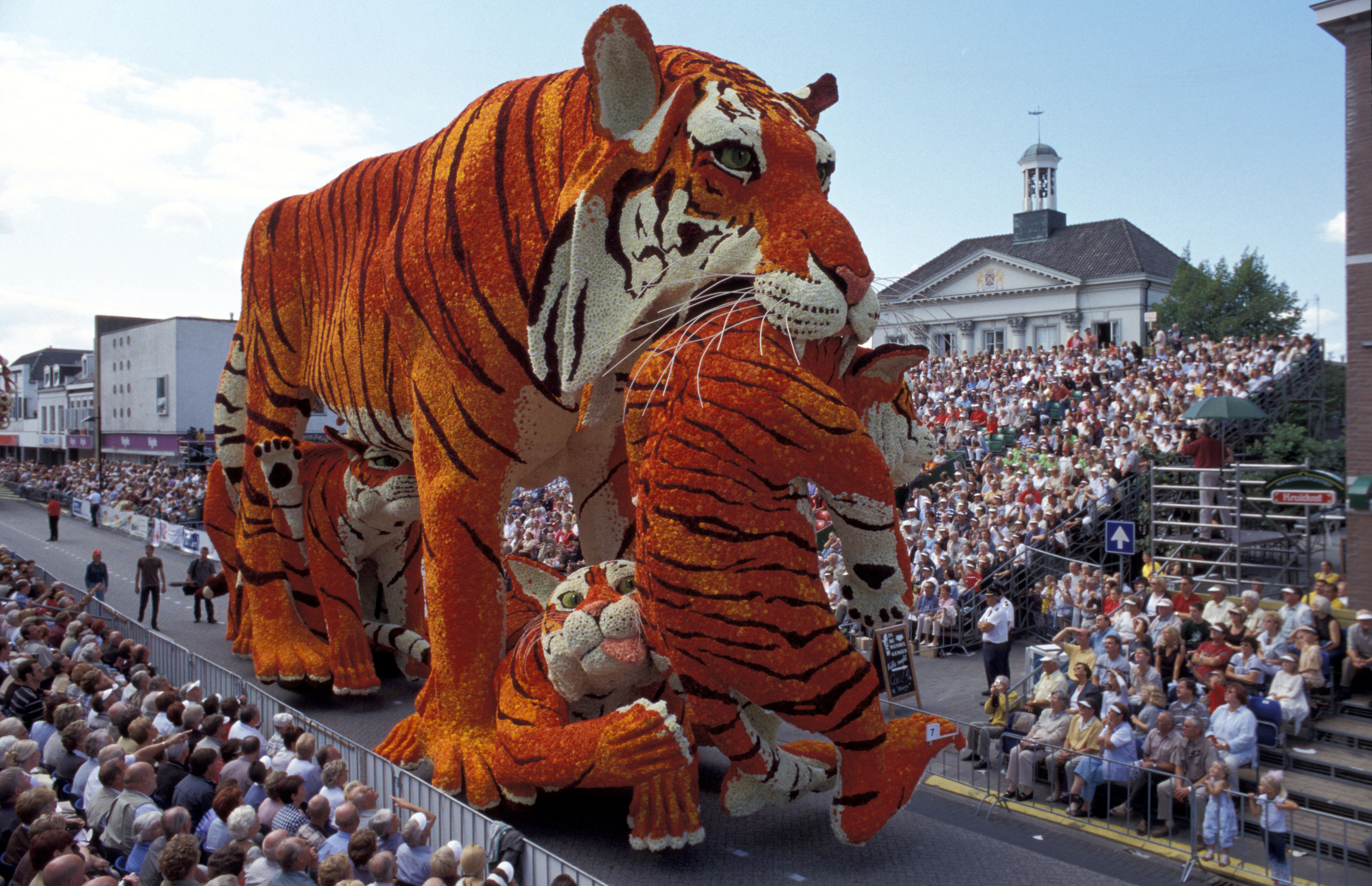
Winning float 'Moeders Kroost' by Klein Zundertse Heikant (hamlet) at Bloemencorso Zundert 2002

Bloemencorso Zundert is the largest flower parade in the world. The parade takes place on the first Sunday of September, in Zundert, Netherlands. The floats are large artworks made of steel wire, cardboard, papier-mâché, and flowers. They are constructed entirely by volunteers. In the Bloemencorso Zundert, only dahlias are used to decorate the floats. Thousands often required to construct one and in total, around 8 million dahlias are needed for the Corso. Of these, around 6 million are cultivated in Zundert. The parade was founded in 1936.

The floats are made by twenty different neighbourhoods, each with hundreds of volunteer builders of all ages. Older members of the neighbourhood are usually responsible for planting and growing the dahlias, while younger ones build the floats in large temporary tents that are built exclusively for the event.

The bloemencorso is also a competition. A professional and independent jury decides which float is the most beautiful and which neighbourhood will be crowned the winner of that year. The Netherlands ratified the UNESCO Convention for the Protection of Intangible Cultural Heritage on 15 May 2012. This ratification was publicly announced during the parade on 2 September 2012 by State Secretary Halbe Zijlstra. On 13 October 2012, the first traditions were published on the national inventory. The first Dutch tradition on the national inventory is the Bloemencorso Zundert.

In December 2021, the culture of flower and fruit parades in the Netherlands, of which the Zundert parade is an element, was inscribed with the International Representative List of Intangible Cultural Heritage of Humanity of Unesco.

In 2020 Bloemencorso Zundert was cancelled for the first time since the Second World War due to the COVID-19 pandemic.

== Social element and hamlets ==
Building a float for the Corso is a social event. Builders of all ages work together for over three months to get the float of their hamlet ready in time for the parade. A lot of time is spent as the competition is fierce and the floats are judged to high aesthetic standards.

The parade takes place on the first Sunday of September but the volunteer builders work on their floats all summer. Work starts when the construction tents are raised in May or June. However, to ensure the flowers' freshness, they are usually applied on the Thursday before the parade which only allows three days for the process. It is consequently a busy time for volunteers and if necessary, they will work day and night to ready their float for the parade.

Most people in Zundert voluntarily give up their days off to work on the float. For these days they use the term Corsokoorts (Corso-fever). The social cohesion that comes from building it is very important. A hamlet is like a family where everyone knows each other and everyone is welcome. After a long evening working on the float people drink a beer together and most hamlets organize all kinds of other activities like song contests and barbecues.

Historically, seventeen hamlets participated in the Corso. In recent years, three more decided to enter the competition. A float costs a 15,000 to 20,000 Euros in materials and hundreds of people are needed. Currently, the following twenty hamlets compete in Bloemencorso Zundert:

- Achtmaal
- De Berk
- De Lent
- Helpt Elkander
- 't Kapelleke
- Klein Zundert
- Klein-Zundertse Heikant
- Laarheide
- Laer-Akkermolen
- Markt
- Molenstraat
- Poteind
- Raamberg
- Stuivezand
- 't Stuk
- Rijsbergen
- Schijf
- Tiggelaar
- Veldstraat
- Wernhout

== See also ==
- Bloemencorso Bollenstreek
- Bloemencorso Vollenhove
