= Ima van Eysinga =

Dutch painter

Ephraima Henriette Johanna "Ima" van Eysinga (February 12, 1881, in Noordwijkerhout – June 28, 1958, in Ermelo) was a Dutch painter, who specialised in water colours. She was a member of the Pulchri Studio. The Centraal Museum held a special exhibition of her work in 1951.
