= Duin- en Bollenstreek =

Region in the Western Netherlands

Coordinates: 52.2379°N 4.4752°E

1645 map of the area (before it was known as the Duin- en Bollenstreek)

The Duin- en Bollenstreek (Dutch pronunciation: [ˈdœyn ɛm ˈbɔlə(n)streːk]; Dutch for "Dune and Bulb Region") is a region in the Western Netherlands, that features coastal dunes and the cultivation of flower bulbs. Situated at the heart of historical Holland nearby the city of Leiden, South Holland, it is bordered by The Hague to the west and Haarlem to the north. The combination of beaches, flower fields, lakes and history makes this area attractive to tourists.

== Composition and name ==
The Dune and Bulb Region stretches from the area around the lower reaches of the Old Rhine west of Leiden to just south of Haarlem. Since it is not a municipality or administrative region, the region's borders are not clearly defined. The Dune and Bulb Region proper is made up of the towns from Katwijk to Hillegom, and from the coast to the Kaag Lakes. Officials consider six municipalities to be part of this region: Hillegom, Katwijk, Lisse, Noordwijk, Noordwijkerhout and Teylingen. However, towns just outside these boundaries also consider themselves to be part of this region. Most of the towns in this area are in an administrative region called "Holland Rijnland", a regional collaboration (samenwerkingsverband) consisting of various municipalities in the Duin- en Bollenstreek and the Leiden area.

This area is the southern part of a larger flower-growing area called the Bulb Region (Bollenstreek). However, it is not unusual for the Dune and Bulb Region itself to be referred to as the Bulb Region.

== Geography of the area ==
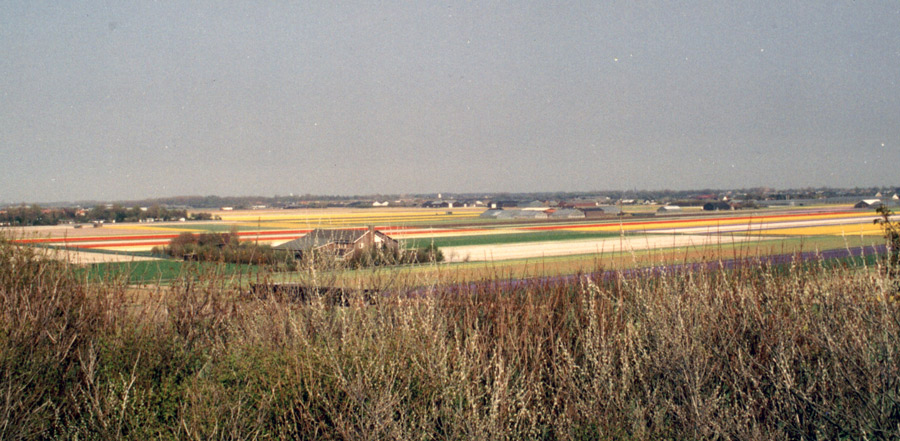
Flower fields lying behind dunes near Noordwijkerhout

The region is characterised by wide sandy ridges of flat land (cleared from dunes from 1650 to 1955 for agricultural use and human habitation), sandy soil between the dunes and polders (geestgrond), bulb fields and pasture land (weiland), all of which is protected from the North Sea by an extensive dune area.

The climate and soil of the region are excellent for bulb cultivation. Proximity to the sea results in a substantial amount of rain.

The mild autumn and winter, the cool but sunny spring and the drier summer ensures a growing season lasting from the early spring to the late autumn.

== Floriculture and the floral industry ==
Floriculture business

Floriculture, the processing of bulbs for export, and other activities in the floral industry are major economic activities in this area. Bulb cultivation in this area began at the end of the 16th century. Tulip mania in the early 17th century played a particularly important role in its development.

The bulbs are planted in the autumn. The earth is covered with straw and packed down to help protect the bulbs from the frost. The flower season begins with the flowering of crocuses in March, followed at the end of March by the combined flowering of tulips, narcissus (also known as daffodils) and hyacinths, which extends into early May. In the autumn, a further display occurs when gladioli, dahlias, carnations and asters flower.

These flowers are often grown primarily for the bulb, not the flower. After they have bloomed, the flowers are decapitated. The flower may be used in floral wreaths. In the summer the bulbs are dug out and the plant remains are burned in the fields. The bulbs are sorted, the bulbs large enough to flower being sold and the smaller bulbs replanted. The bulbs are peeled, usually by students or foreign workers. They are then disinfected and dried out at a high temperature in huge bulb sheds (bollenschuren), a characteristic building in this area. The bulbs are traded at flower auctions in Rijnsburg, Lisse and Aalsmeer and then exported from nearby Schiphol Airport to many countries throughout the world.

== Attractions ==
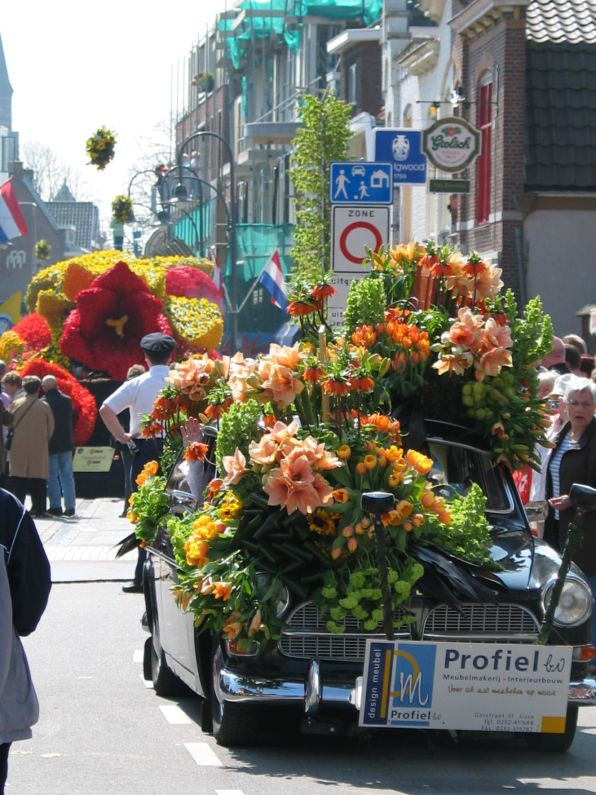
Scene at the annual flower parade

When the bulb fields are in bloom, this region is one of the most colourful (and the most visited) in the world. Keukenhof in particular attracts 850,000 to 1,000,000 (foreign) visitors every year. The combination of flowers, windmills, quaint villages and Dutch charm is irresistible. The people in this area are in the flower business and make no apologies for it.

There are a few "flower parades" (bloemencorso) in this area. One of them is the Bloemencorso Bollenstreek in April, during which floral floats, magnificently decorated cars and marching bands parade slowly from Noordwijk aan Zee through Sassenheim, Lisse, Hillegom, Heemstede to Haarlem. In August there is another flower parade from Leiden through Rijnsburg to Katwijk aan Zee.

Other attractions in the region include:

- the clean, wide beaches extending along the entire coast
- the beach resorts, especially at Noordwijk aan Zee
- extensive coastal dune area (walking, cycling)
- the Kaag lakes just to the east of the area (boating, Dutch landscape, windmills)
- two castles (Huys Dever and Slot Teylingen) and various grand manor houses
- museums (De Zwarte Tulp, Panorama Tulipland, Museum Oud-Noordwijk, Katwijk Museum, the Space Expo at ESTEC and others)
- the attractive and historic village centres
- proximity to Leiden and Haarlem and, a little further afield, Amsterdam, The Hague and Delft

== Towns and villages ==
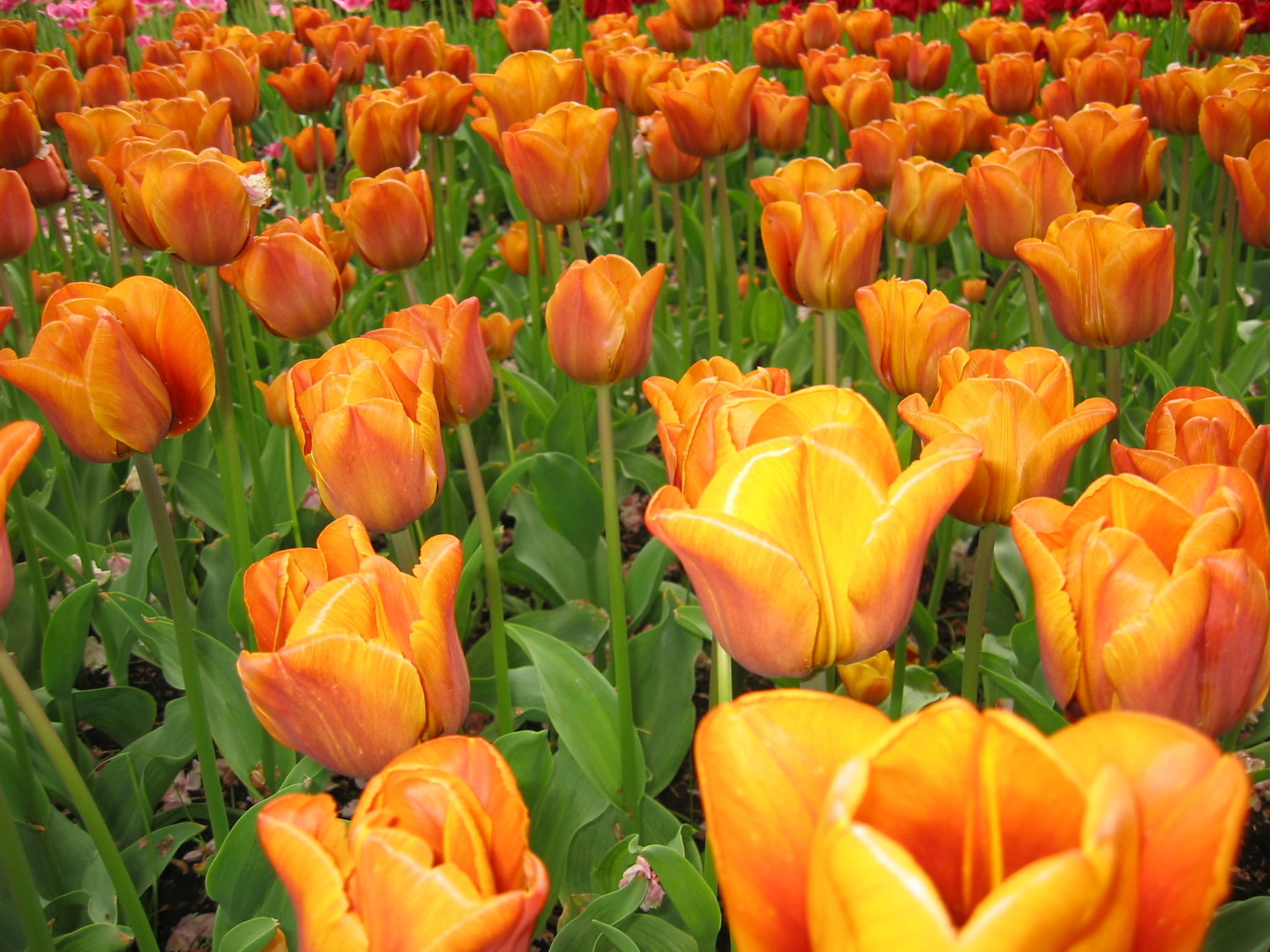
Tulips at Keukenhof

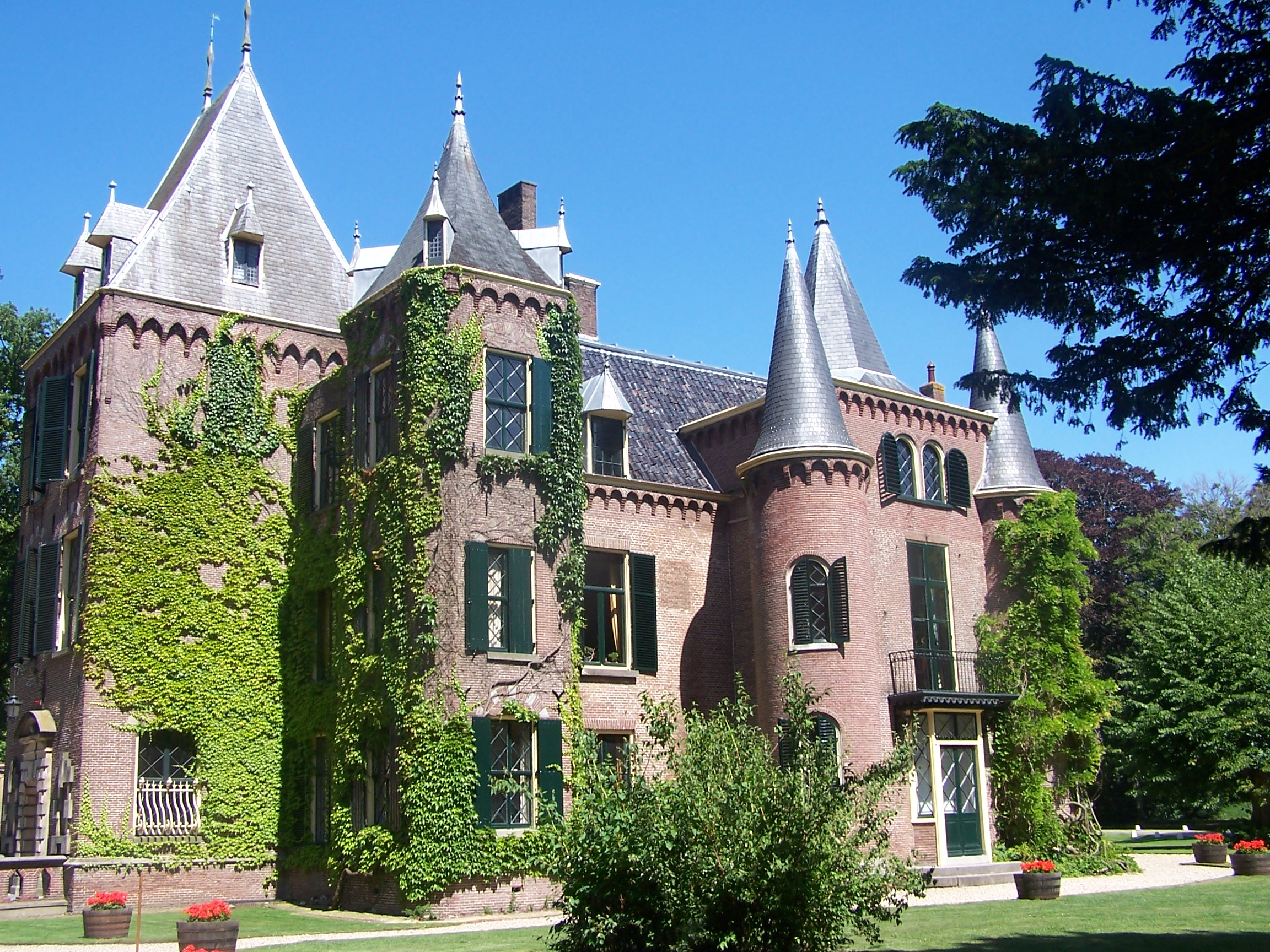
Keukenhof Castle

- De Engel
- De Kaag
- De Zilk
- Hillegom
- Katwijk aan Zee
- Katwijk
- Lisse
- Lisserbroek
- Noordwijk
- Noordwijk aan Zee
- Noordwijkerhout
- Oegstgeest
- Rijnsburg
- Sassenheim
- Teylingen
- Voorhout
- Warmond

== See also ==
- National Tulip Day, opening of the tulip season in Amsterdam (January).
- Keukenhof, flower garden in The Netherlands
