= Bloemencorso =

Dutch and Belgian flower parade

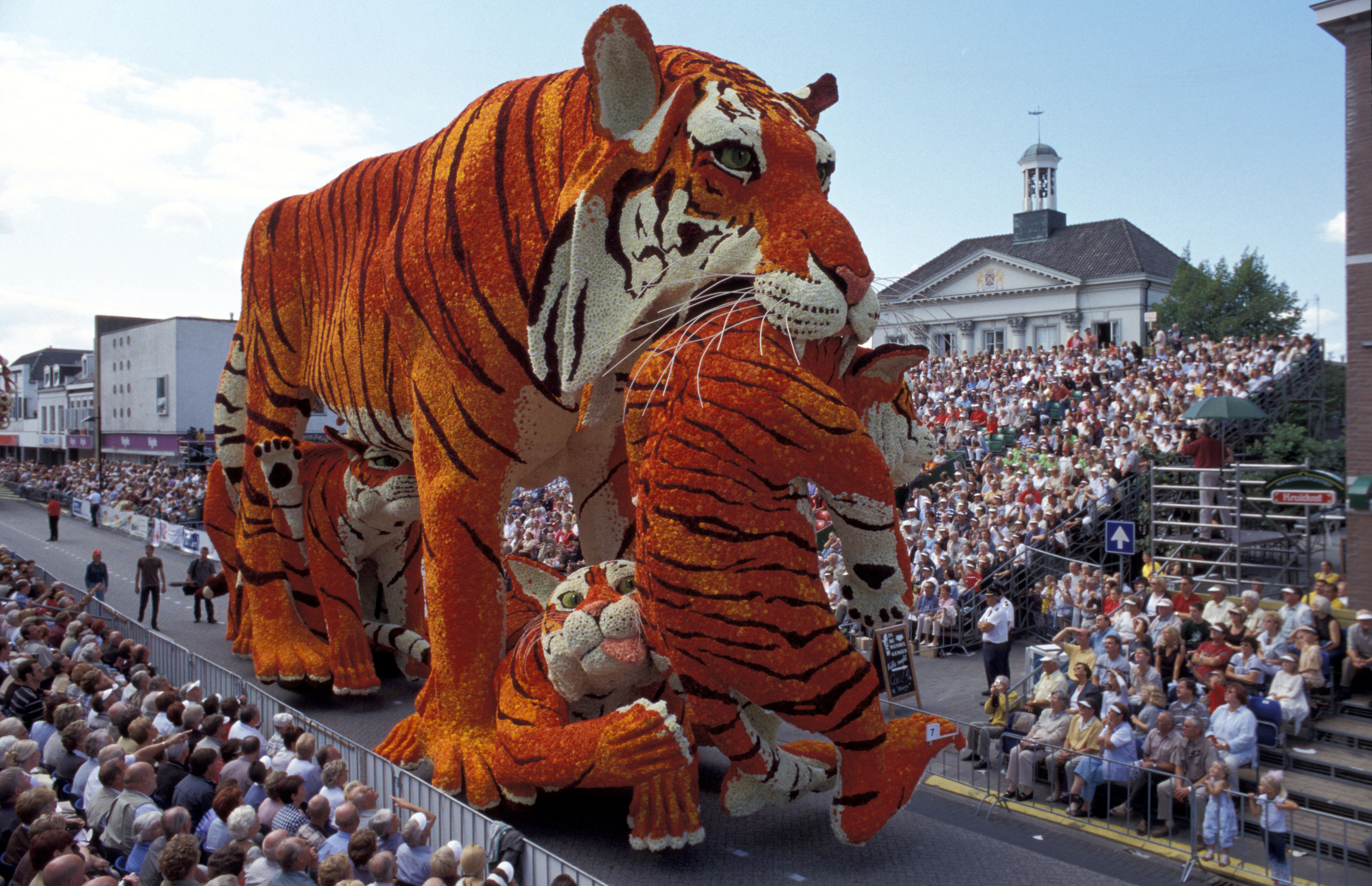
Float in Bloemencorso Zundert

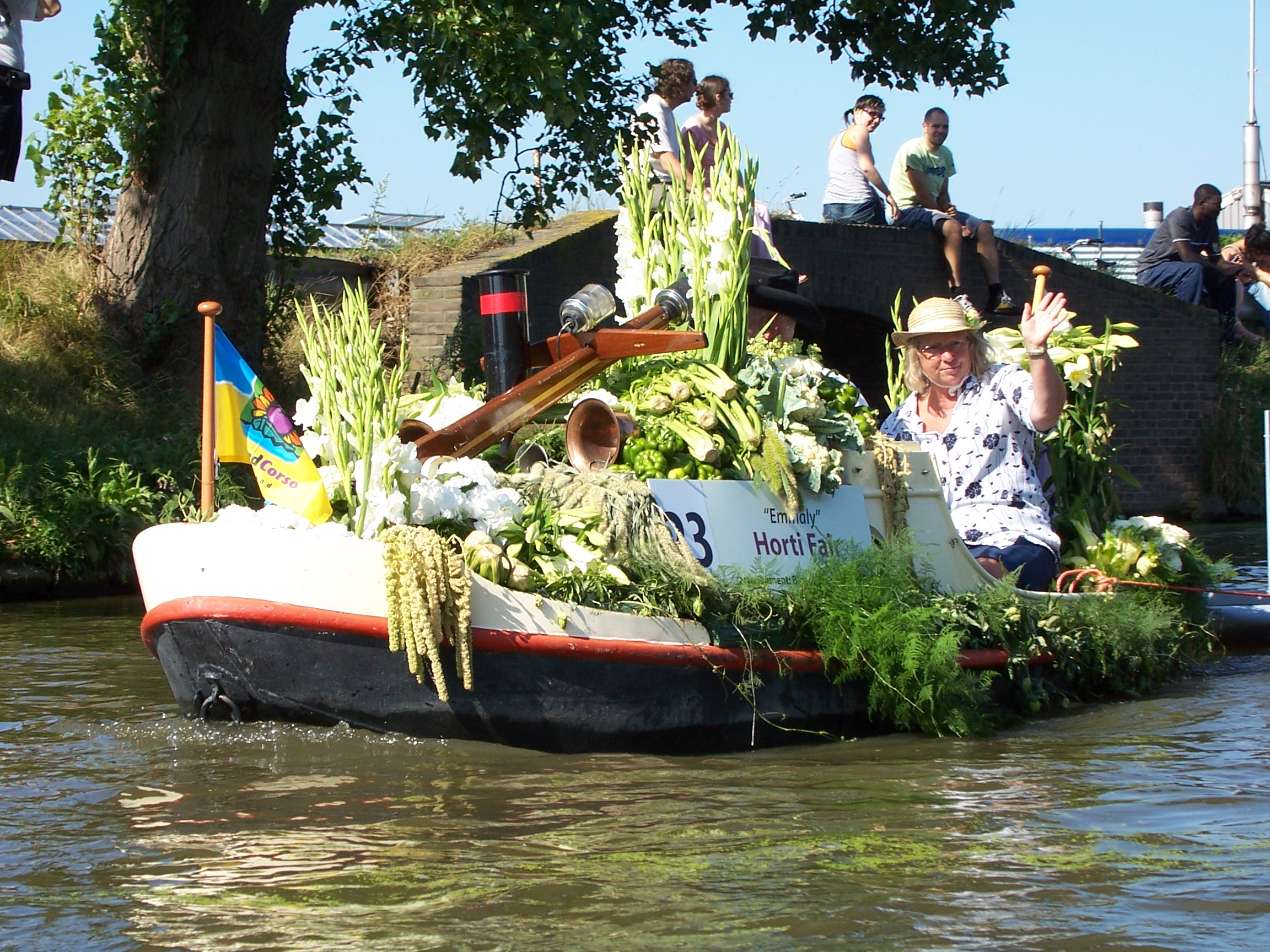
Boat float in flower parade in Westland

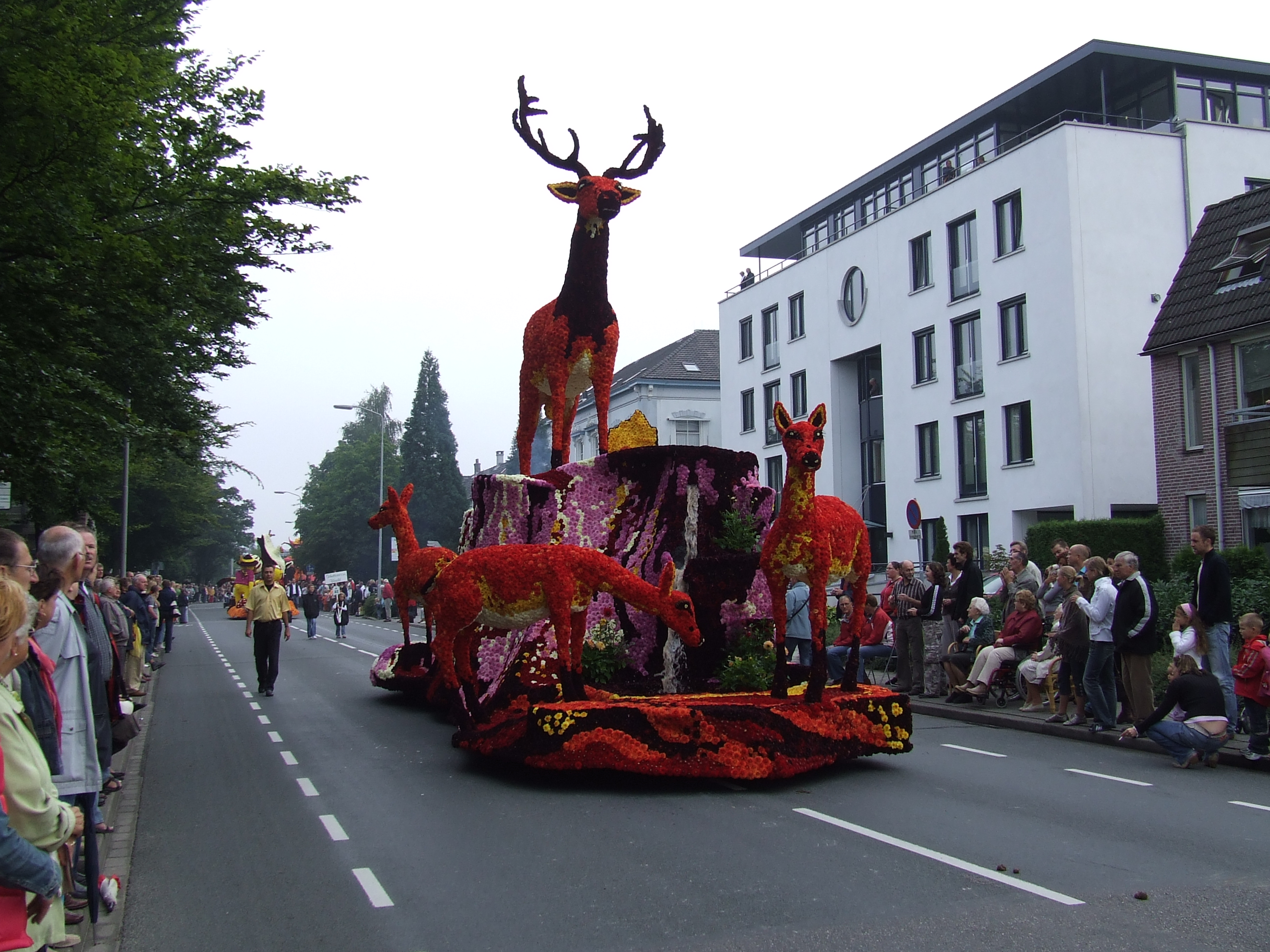
Float in flower parade in Winterswijk

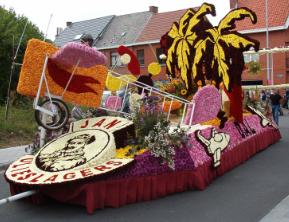
Float in flower parade in Sint-Gillis-bij-Dendermonde

In the Netherlands and Belgium, a bloemencorso (Dutch pronunciation: [ˈblumə(ŋ)ˌkɔrsoː]; meaning "flower parade", "flower pageant" or "flower procession") is a parade where the floats (praalwagens), cars and (in some cases) boats are magnificently decorated or covered in flowers. This custom goes back as far as the Middle Ages. Each parade has its own character, charm and theme. Many towns and regions in the area hold parades every year.

In December 2021, the culture of flower and fruit parades in the Netherlands was inscribed with the International Representative List of Intangible Cultural Heritage of Humanity of UNESCO.

== Netherlands ==
- Aalsmeer, Aalsmeerse Bloemencorso (1948–2007)
- Beltrum, Bloemencorso Beltrum
- Belt-Schutsloot, Gondelvaart Belt-Schutsloot
- Drogeham, Gondelvaart op wielen Drogeham
- Duin- en Bollenstreek, Bloemencorso Bollenstreek
- Eelde, Bloemencorso Eelde
- Elim, Bloemencorso Elim
- Frederiksoord, Floraliacorso Frederiksoord
- Leersum, Bloemencorso Leersum
- Rijnsburg-Katwijk-Noordwijk, Rijnsburgcorso
- Lemelerveld, Bloemencorso Lemelerveld
- Lichtenvoorde, Bloemencorso Lichtenvoorde
- Noordwijk-Sassenheim-Lisse-Haarlem, Bloemencorso Bollenstreek
- Rekken, Bloemencorso Rekken
- Roelofarendsveen, Bloemencorso Roelofarendsveen
- Sint Jansklooster, Sint Jansklooster Bloemencorso
- Valkenswaard, Bloemencorso Valkenswaard
- Vollenhove, Bloemencorso Vollenhove
- Voorthuizen, Bloemencorso Voorthuizen
- Winkel, Bloemencorso Winkel
- Westland, Varend Corso Westland
- Winterswijk, Bloemencorso Winterswijk
- Zundert, Bloemencorso Zundert The largest flower parade in the world.

== Belgium ==
- Blankenberge, Bloemencorso Blankenberge
- Hergenrath, Blumenkorso Hergenrath
- Loenhout, Bloemencorso Loenhout
- Sint-Gillis-bij-Dendermonde, Sint-Gillis-bij-Dendermonde Bloemencorso
