= LAM Museum =

Coordinates: 52.2681°N 4.5422°E

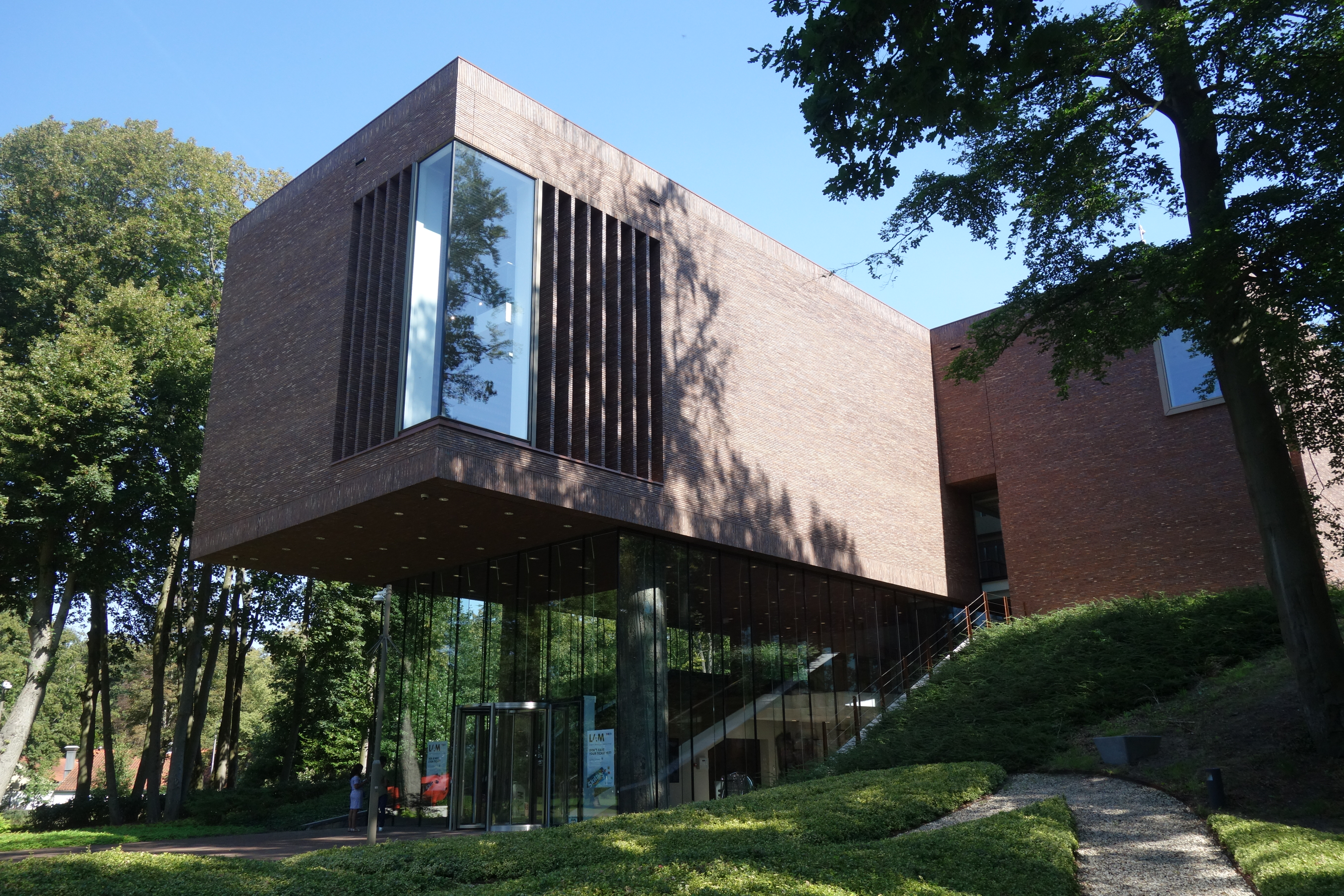
- Established: 2019
- Location: Keukenhof, Lisse, Netherlands
- Type: Art museum
- Website: https://www.lammuseum.nl/en/

LAM Museum (Lisser Art Museum) is an art museum in Lisse, the Netherlands, with a focus on art related to food. The museum is located in the flower garden of Keukenhof. It opened in 2019.

The collection includes works by artists Renzo Martens, Yinka Shonibare, Ron Mueck, Uta Eisenreich, George Belzer, Peter Anton, Stefan Gross, and Itamar Gilboa, who recorded in porcelain what he ate and drank for a year.

== History ==
In October 2024, an artwork on display, All The Good Times We Spent Together by French artist Alexandre Lavet, was accidentally thrown out by an elevator technician who mistook the artwork for leftover trash. The artwork consisted of two empty beer cans.
