= Lisse =

- Municipality
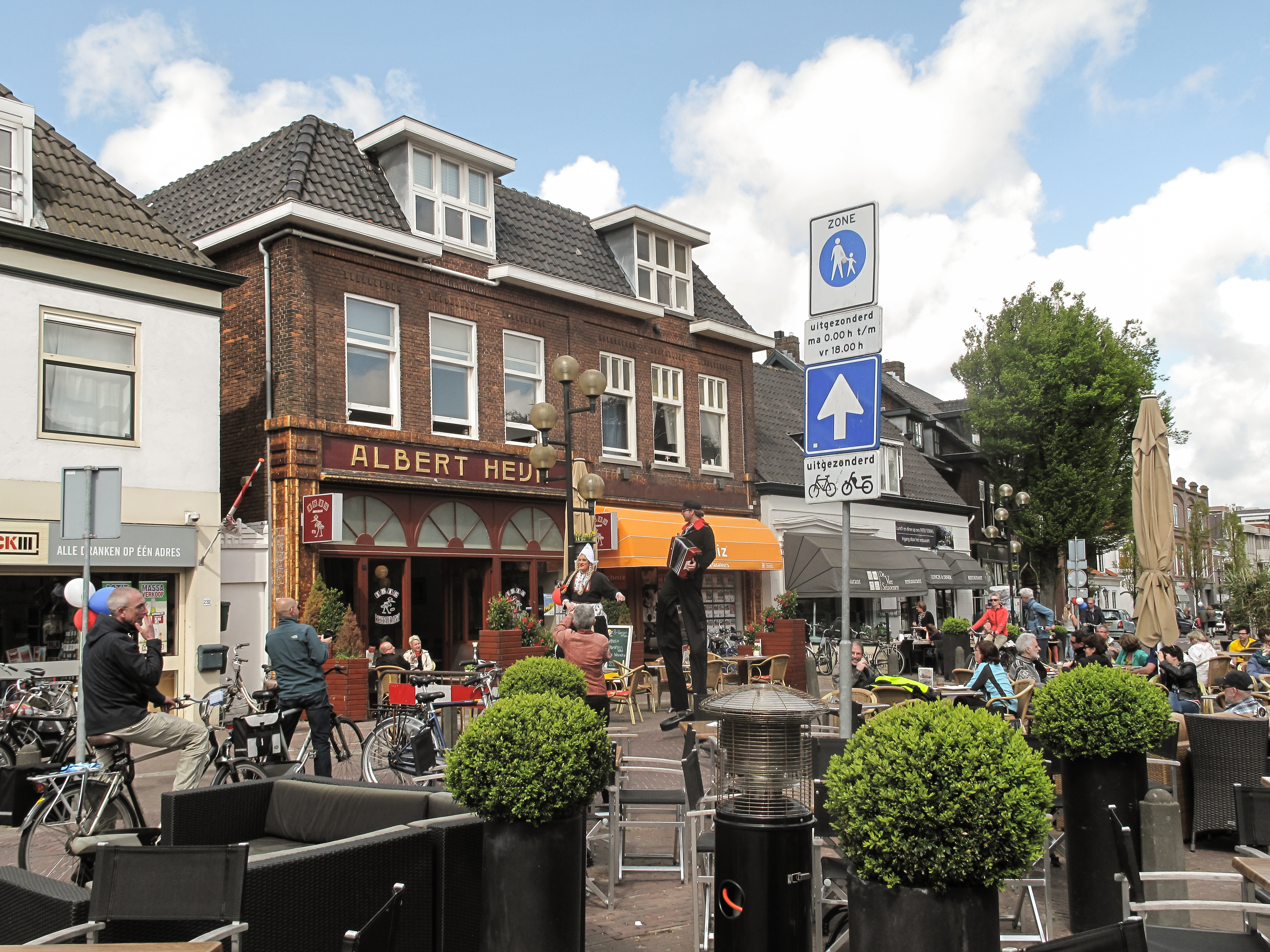
- Heereweg through Lisse

- Flag Coat of arms

- Location in South Holland
- Coordinates: 52°15′N 4°33′E
- Country: Netherlands
- Province: South Holland

Government
  - Body: Municipal council
  - Mayor: Lies Spruit (PvdA)

Area
  - Total: 16.05 km^{2} (6.20 sq mi)
  - Land: 15.69 km^{2} (6.06 sq mi)
  - Water: 0.36 km^{2} (0.14 sq mi)
- Elevation: 1 m (3.3 ft)

Population (January 2021)
  - Total: 22,982
  - Density: 1,465/km^{2} (3,790/sq mi)
- Demonym(s): Lissenaar, Lissenees or Lisser
- Time zone: UTC+1 (CET)
  - Summer (DST): UTC+2 (CEST)
- Postcode: 2160–2163
- Area code: 0252
- Website: www.lisse.nl

Lisse (Dutch: [ˈlɪsə]) is a town and municipality in the province of South Holland in the Western Netherlands. The municipality, which lies within the Duin- en Bollenstreek, covers an area of 16.05 km^{2} (6.20 sq mi) of which 0.36 km^{2} (0.14 sq mi) is water. Its population was 22,982 in 2021. Located within the municipal boundary is also the community De Engel.

== History ==
=== Early history ===
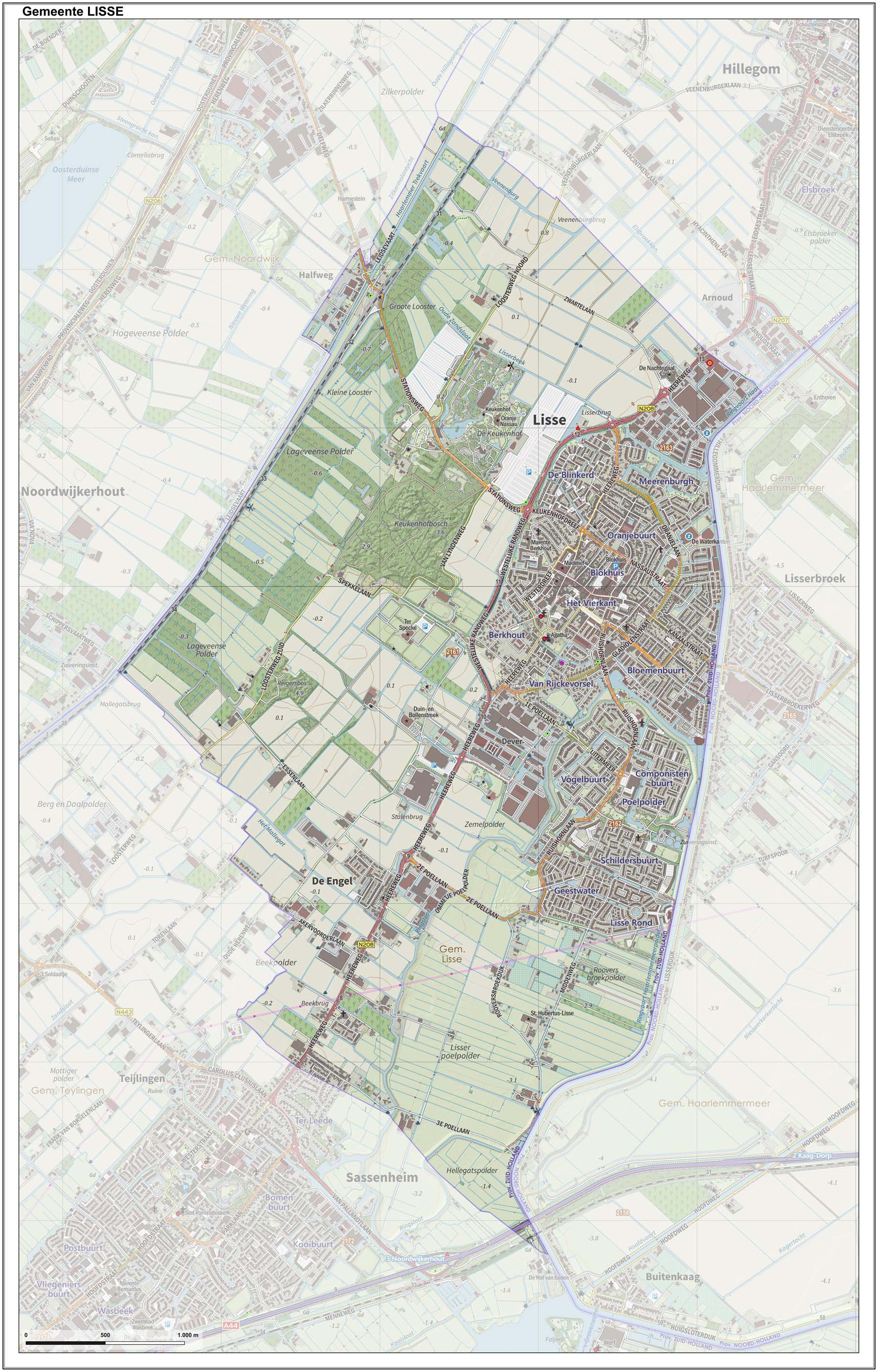
Topographic map of Lisse, 2015

The history of Lisse is closely related and similar to the neighboring towns of Hillegom and Sassenheim. Based on a document from 1198 which makes official mention of the town's name, Lisse celebrated its 800-year anniversary in 1998, although there is an indication that there was already a settlement there in the 10th century.

In the Middle Ages, Lisse was a small settlement; there were only 50 houses in 1500. Because of prolonged warfare (particularly the wars of Charles the Bold and the Eighty Years' War), poverty was prevalent. Its population lived from agriculture, animal husbandry and peat harvesting.

=== Recent history ===
In the 17th and 18th centuries, Lisse was, like Hillegom, home to many estates of rich merchants and nobility. The forests and gardens of Keukenhof, Meerenburg, Wildlust, Zandvliet, Overduin en Akervoorde, Wassergeest, Grotenhof, Ter Specke, Dubbelhoven, Rosendaal, Veenenburg en Berkhout, Middelburg, Ter Beek and Uytermeer estates all added to the town's beauty and glory.

Yet in the following centuries, every one of these estates (except Keukenhof) was removed to make way for the cultivation of bulb flowers. The sandy soil in Lisse's surroundings were highly suitable for its growth provided the soil was fertilised. The nearby dunes were excavated and forests cut down progressively over time for more fields for the flower business. This brought employment and prosperity to this area.

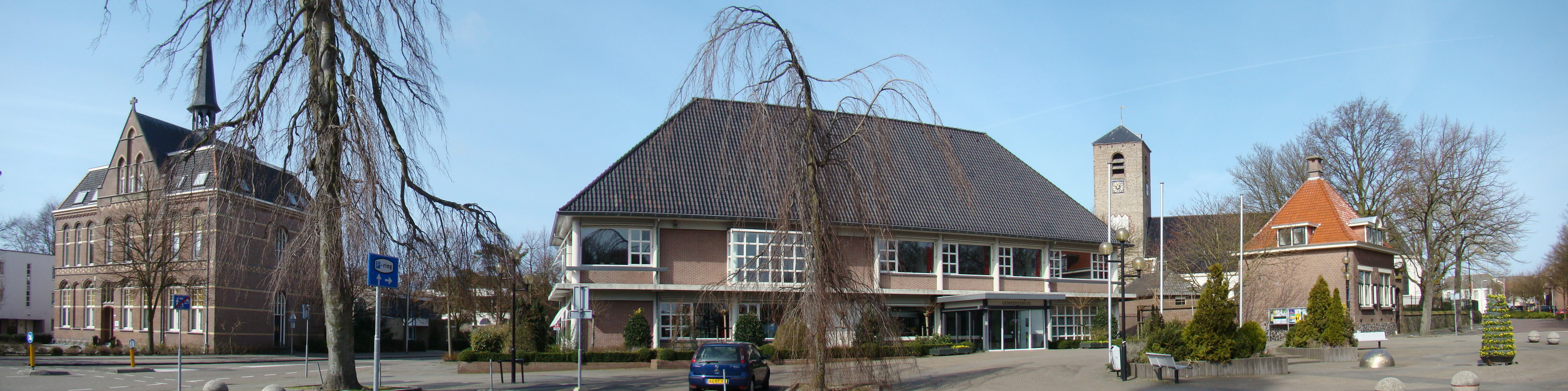
Lisse town centre

== Floriculture centre ==
In the 20th century, the bulb flower business continued to boom, resulting in the establishment of auction and trading houses, large-scale cultivators and cooperatives. Today, Lisse exports bulbflowers in large quantities to over a hundred countries worldwide.

Located at the centre of the "Dune and Bulb Region" (Duin- en Bollenstreek), Holland's flower-growing region, Lisse is also a major tourist attraction. During the spring when the fields around Lisse are in a colourful bloom, hundreds of thousands of local and foreign tourists visit the area. The only remaining estate that was not removed for flower cultivation (Keukenhof) became world-famous for its flower displays.

== Tourism and attractions ==
The most popular attraction in Lisse is Keukenhof, open only during spring when the tulips are flowering. Also each spring a flower parade called the Bollenstreek Bloemencorso is held through the main streets of Lisse. In August the fantasy festival Castlefest is held in the gardens of Castle Keukenhof.

Other places of interest are the museums:

- Huys Dever, a restored castle tower from the 14th century
- Castle Keukenhof, part of the Keukenhof estate but open year-round
- Museum De Zwarte Tulp (Black Tulip Museum), exhibiting the history of the Dutch bulb-growing region
- LAM Museum, an art gallery about food
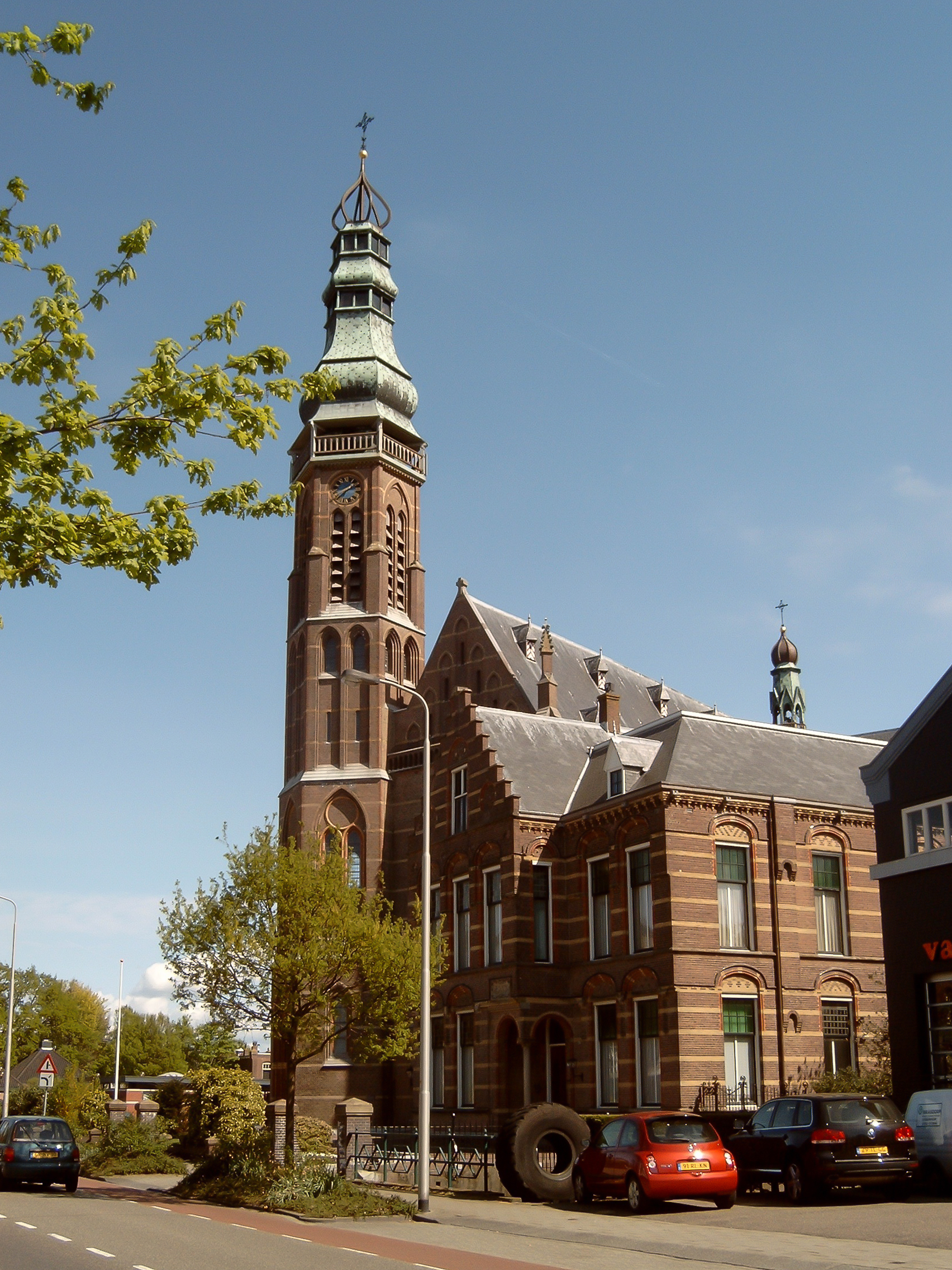
Sint-Agathakerk

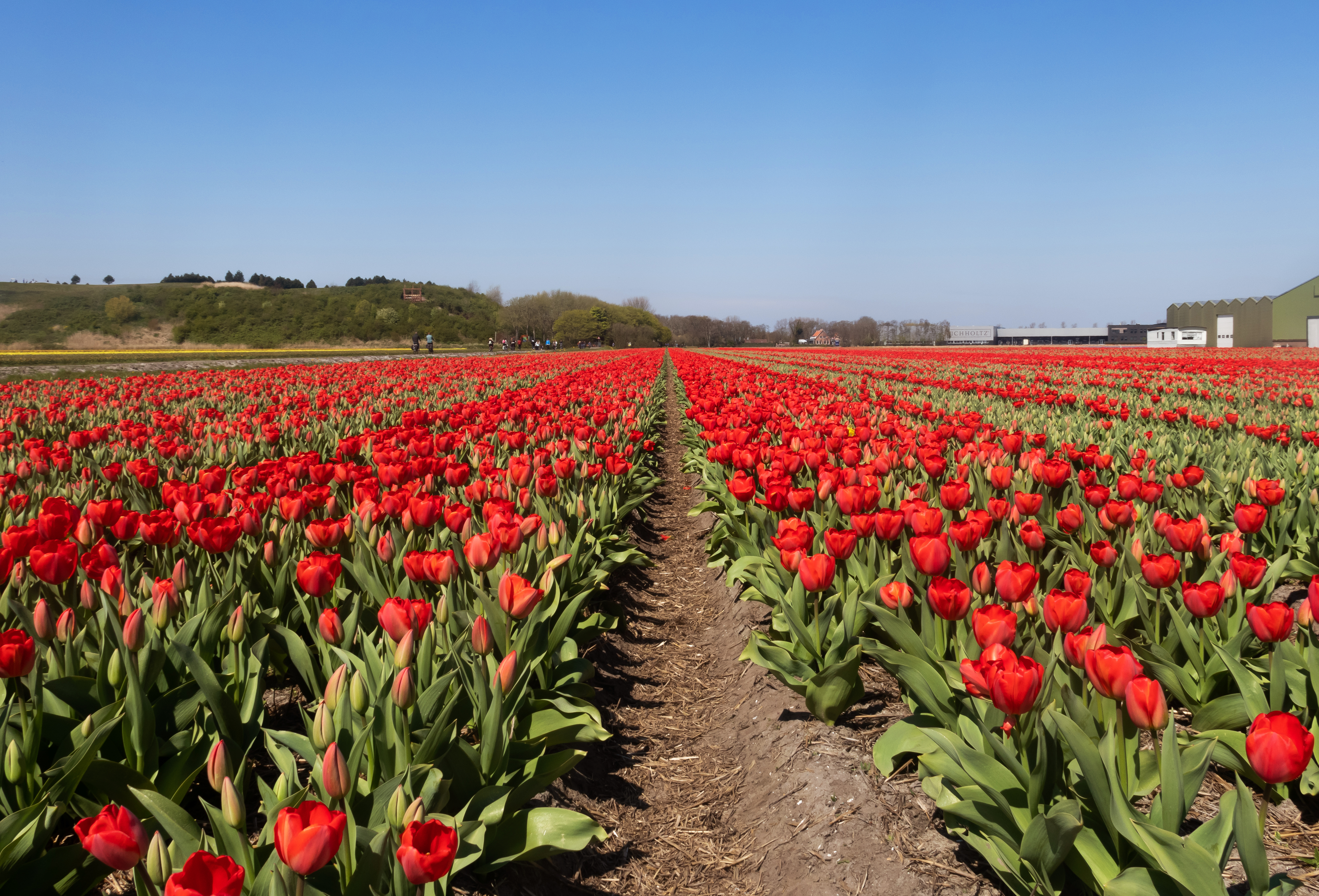
A field of tulips in Lisse

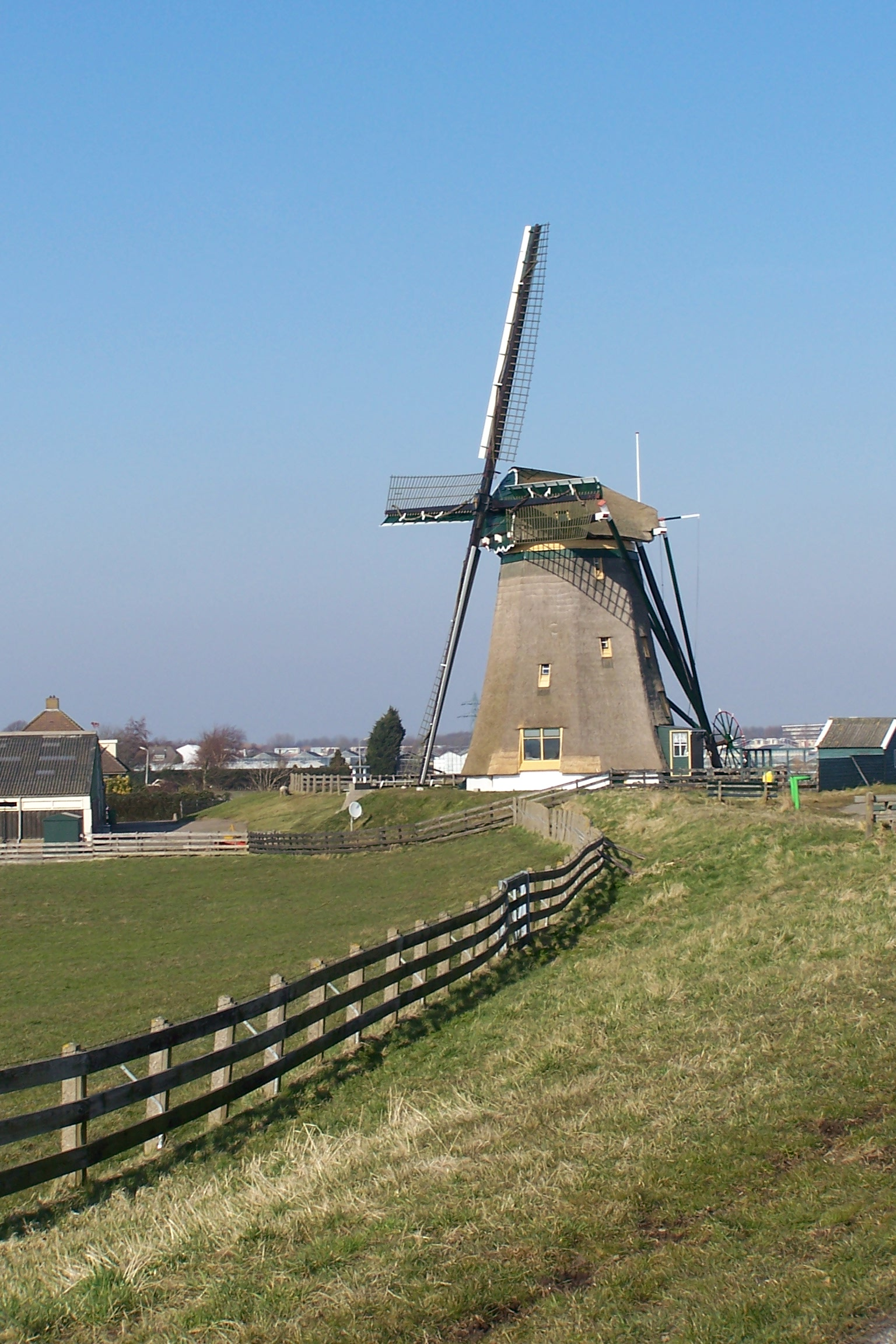
Windmill in Lisse

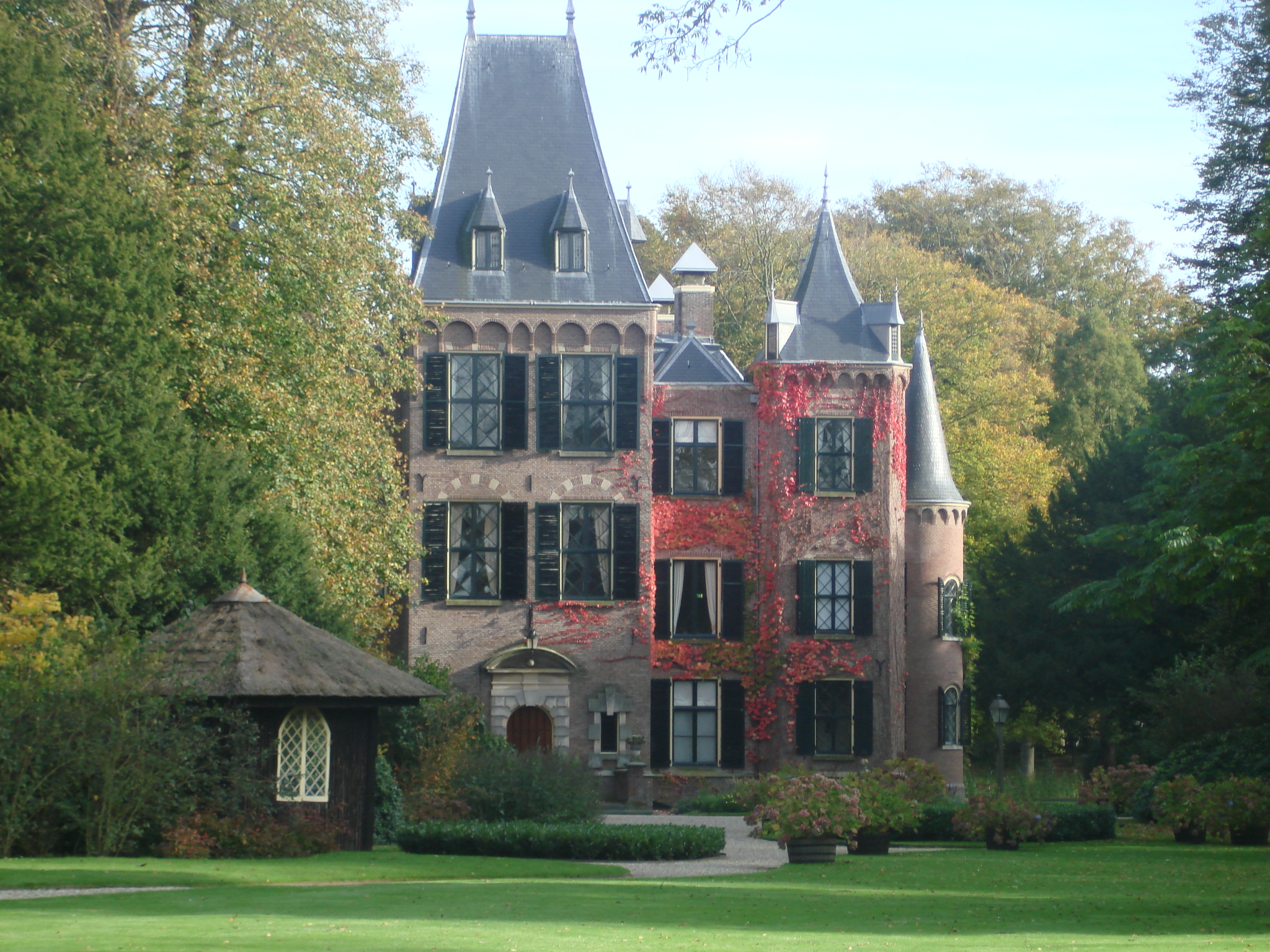
Castle Keukenhof

== Sports ==
Lisse is the home of FC Lisse, a football team currently playing in the Zaterdag Topklasse. On 3 May 2008 FC Lisse sealed the championship of the 2007/2008 season in the Hoofdklasse A.

== Notable people ==
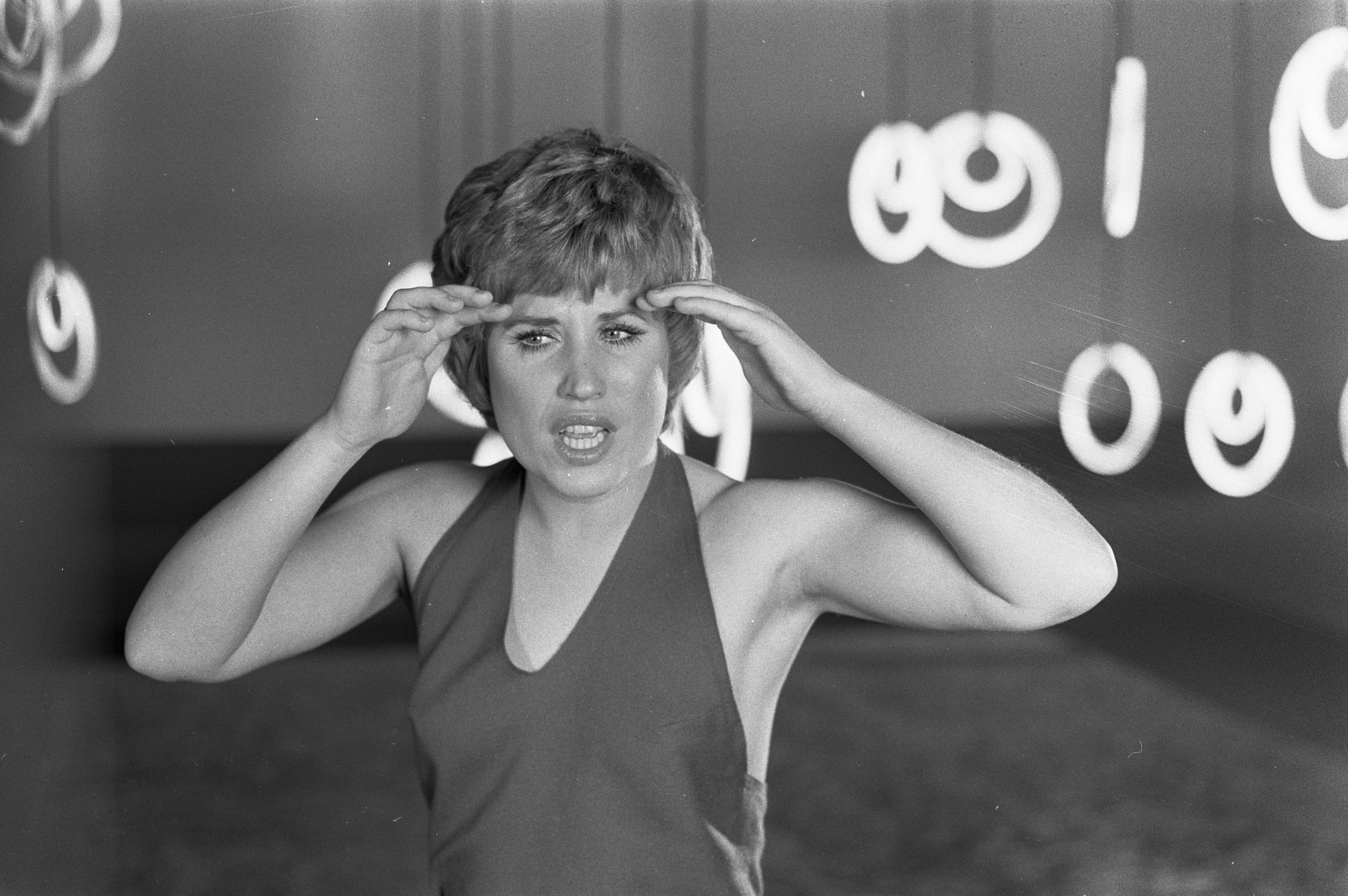
Jenny Arean, 1972

- Abraham Rademaker (1677–1735), a Dutch painter and printmaker
- Joseph Smit (1836–1929), a Dutch zoological illustrator
- Wander Johannes de Haas (1878–1960), a Dutch physicist and mathematician, known for the Einstein–de Haas effect
- Jacob Veldhuyzen van Zanten (1927–1977), a Dutch aircraft captain, died in the Tenerife airport disaster
- Egbert van 't Oever (1927–2001), a Dutch speed skater, competed in the 1952 and 1956 Winter Olympics
- Adrianus Johannes Simonis (1931–2020), cardinal and Archbishop of Utrecht 1983 to 2007
- Jenny Arean (born 1942), a Dutch singer, actress and comedian
- Bram Moolenaar (1961–2023), a Dutch computer programmer, author of Vim, a text editor
- Marco Vermey (born 1965) a Dutch former professional racing cyclist, rode in the 1994 Tour de France
- Hans Kroes (born 1965), a Dutch freestyle and backstroke swimmer, competed in the 1984 and 1988 Summer Olympics
- Gert-Jan Segers (born 1969), a Dutch political scientist and politician
- Bastiaan Ragas (born 1971), a Dutch actor and singer
