= Noordwijkerhout =

- Town and former municipality
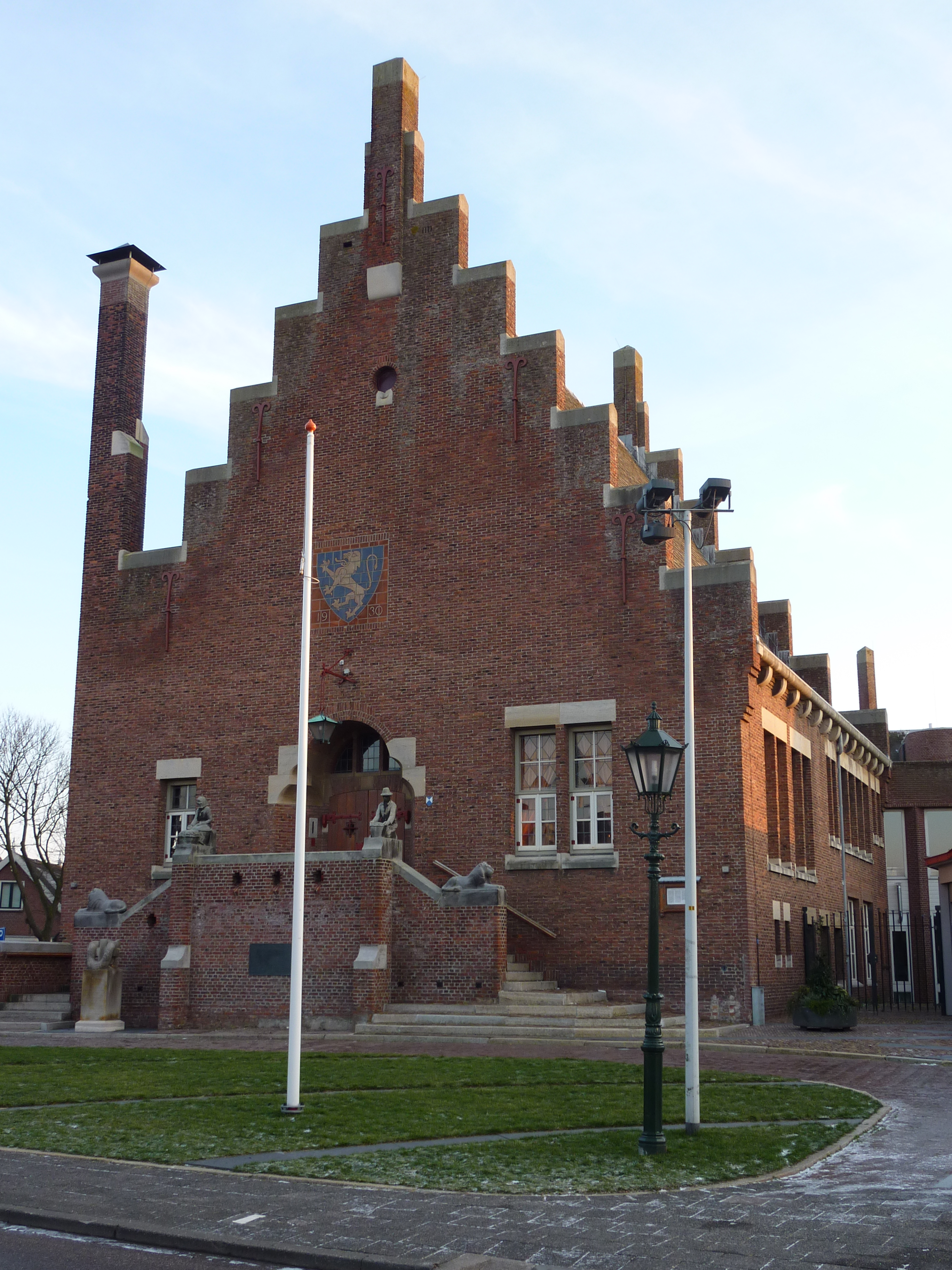
- Former City hall

- Flag Coat of arms

- Location in South Holland
- Coordinates: 52°16′N 4°30′E
- Country: Netherlands
- Province: South Holland
- Municipality: Noordwijk

Area
  - Total: 23.42 km^{2} (9.04 sq mi)
  - Land: 22.61 km^{2} (8.73 sq mi)
  - Water: 0.81 km^{2} (0.31 sq mi)
- Elevation: 3 m (9.8 ft)

Population (2023)
  - Total: 15,415
- Demonym: Noordwijkerhouter
- Time zone: UTC+1 (CET)
  - Summer (DST): UTC+2 (CEST)
- Postcode: 2190–2191, 2210–2211
- Area code: 0252
- Website: www.noordwijkerhout.nl

Noordwijkerhout (Dutch pronunciation: [ˌnoːrtʋɛikərˈɦʌut]) is a town and former municipality in the western part of the Netherlands, in the province of South Holland. The town is currently part of the municipality of Noordwijk and lies in the bulb-growing region (the Duin- en Bollenstreek) of the Netherlands, which is famed for its tulips.

The former municipality of Noordwijkerhout covered an area of 23.42 km^{2} (9.04 sq mi), of which 0.81 km^{2} (0.31 sq mi) was water, and had a population of 15,415 in 2023. It also included the village of De Zilk, which together with the town of Noordwijkerhout became part of the municipality of Noordwijk on 1 January 2019.

== History ==
The coastal dunes where Noordwijkerhout is located have been inhabited since prehistoric times. Archaeological digs in the area just north outside of town have found items and implements from before Christ. During the Roman era, this region was inhabited by a Germanic tribe, called Cananefates by the Roman writer Tacitus.

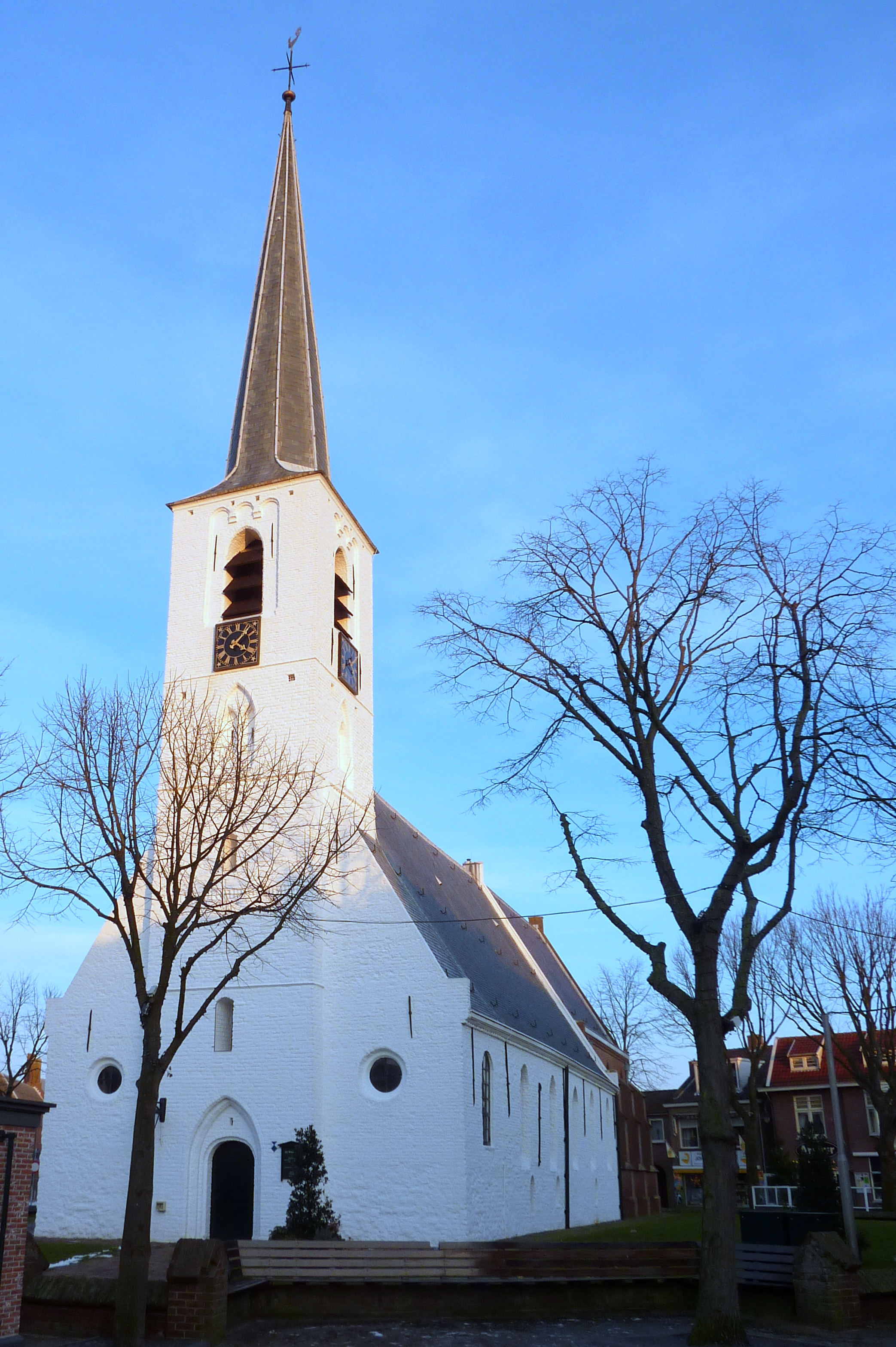
Church in Noordwijkerhout

== Recreation and tourism ==
Noordwijkerhout is about 5 kilometers from the North Sea and provides access to the beach and nearby hiking opportunities through the dunes. Just north of town is the Oosterduinse meer (Eastern Dune's Lake) which is used for swimming and windsurfing. The center is also historical and have a church Witte kerkje.

Noordwijkerhout is located in an area called the "Dune and Bulb Region" (Duin- en Bollenstreek). In the spring when the bulb flower fields are in bloom, many tourist come to the region to admire them. The town's fair is held during the first week of September.

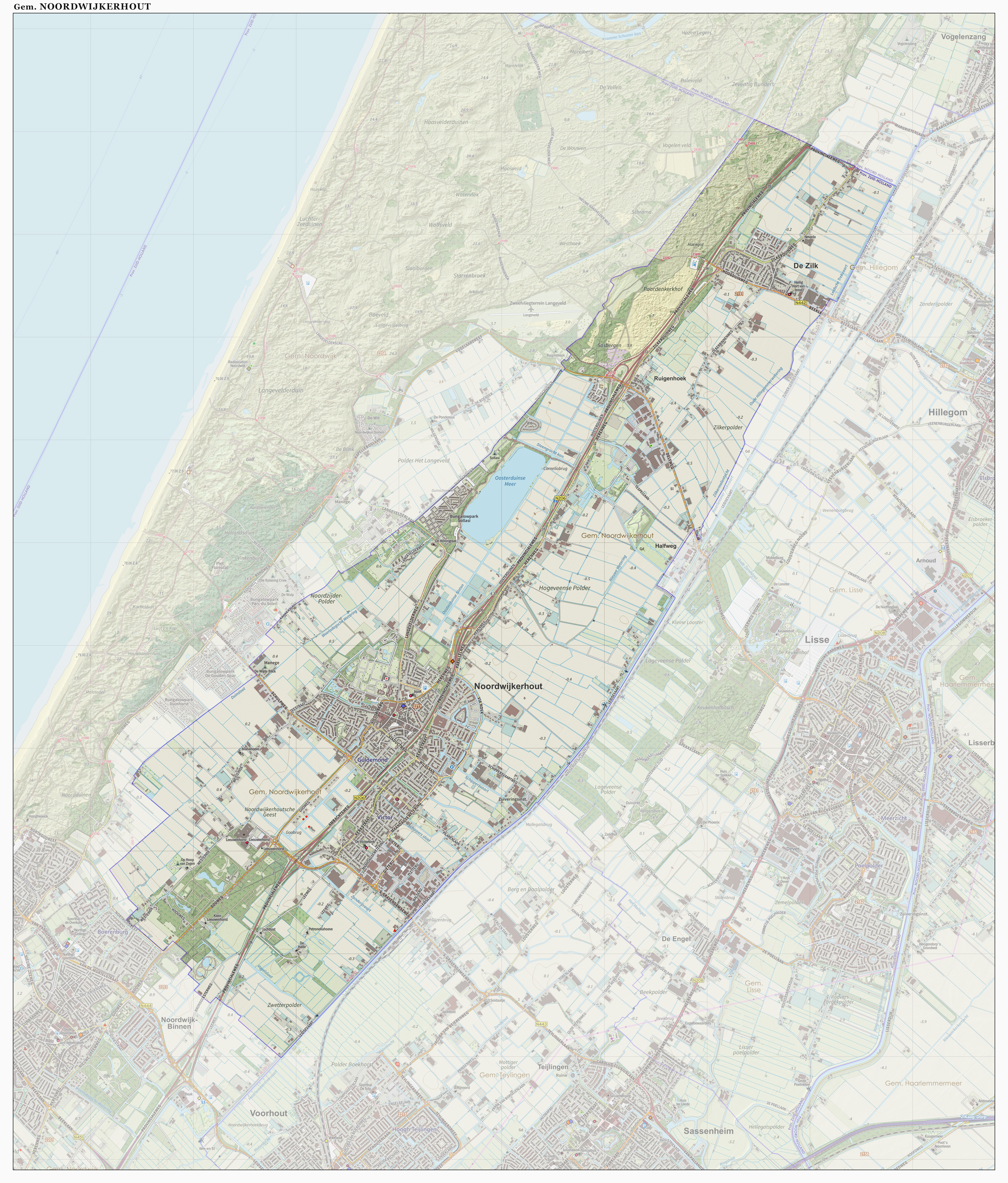

Dutch flower fields near Noordwijkerhout

Dutch topographic map of the municipality of Noordwijkerhout, June 2015

== Notable residents ==
- Bill Vander Zalm, 28th Premier of British Columbia, Canada

== International relations ==
=== Twin towns – Sister cities ===
Noordwijkerhout has one sister city in Japan

- Hirado, Nagasaki, Japan (Sister city)
