= Flower parade =

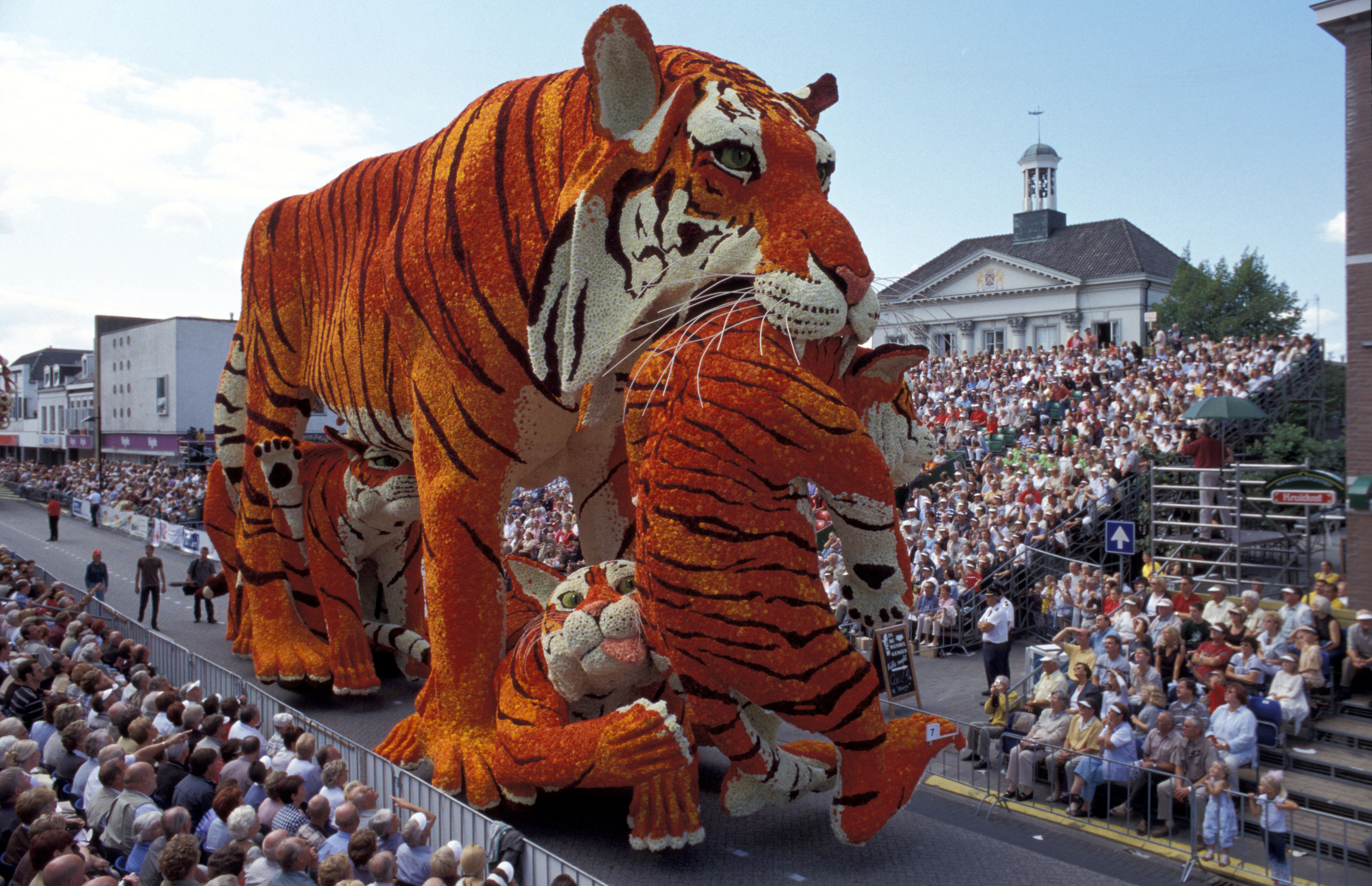
Float in Bloemencorso Zundert in the Netherlands

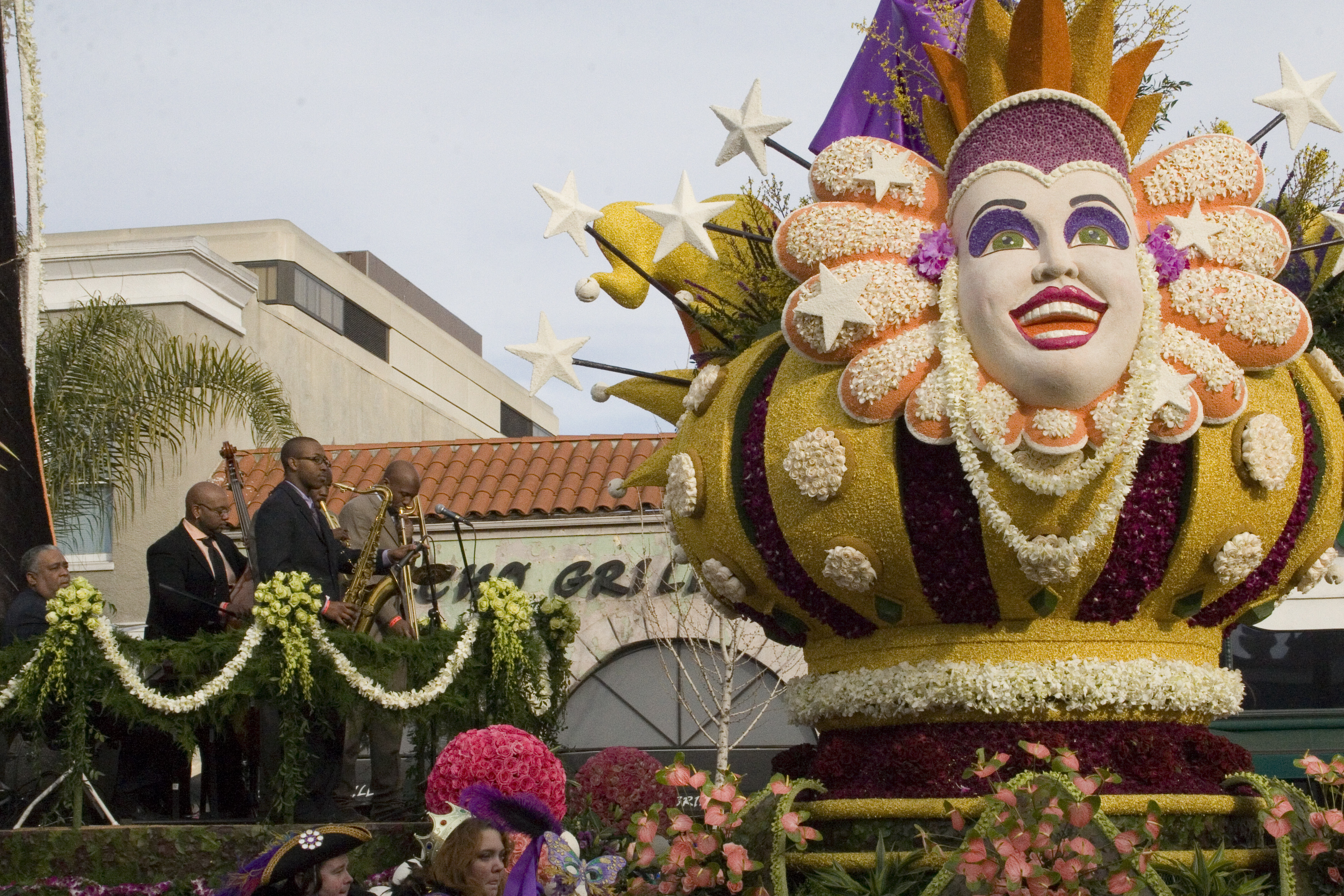
Float from the 2008 Rose Parade in Pasadena, California, United States

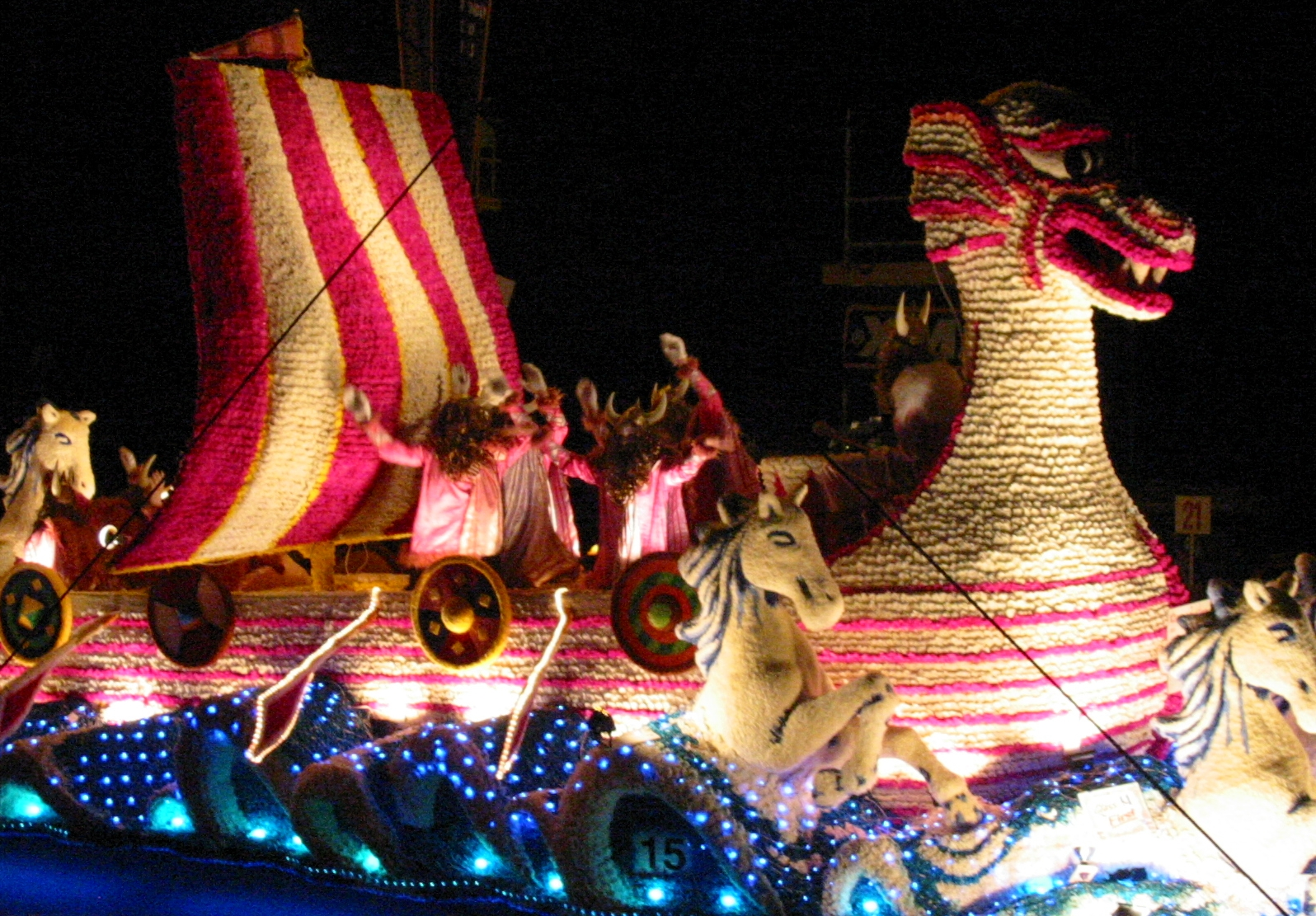
Float in 2007 Jersey Battle of Flowers

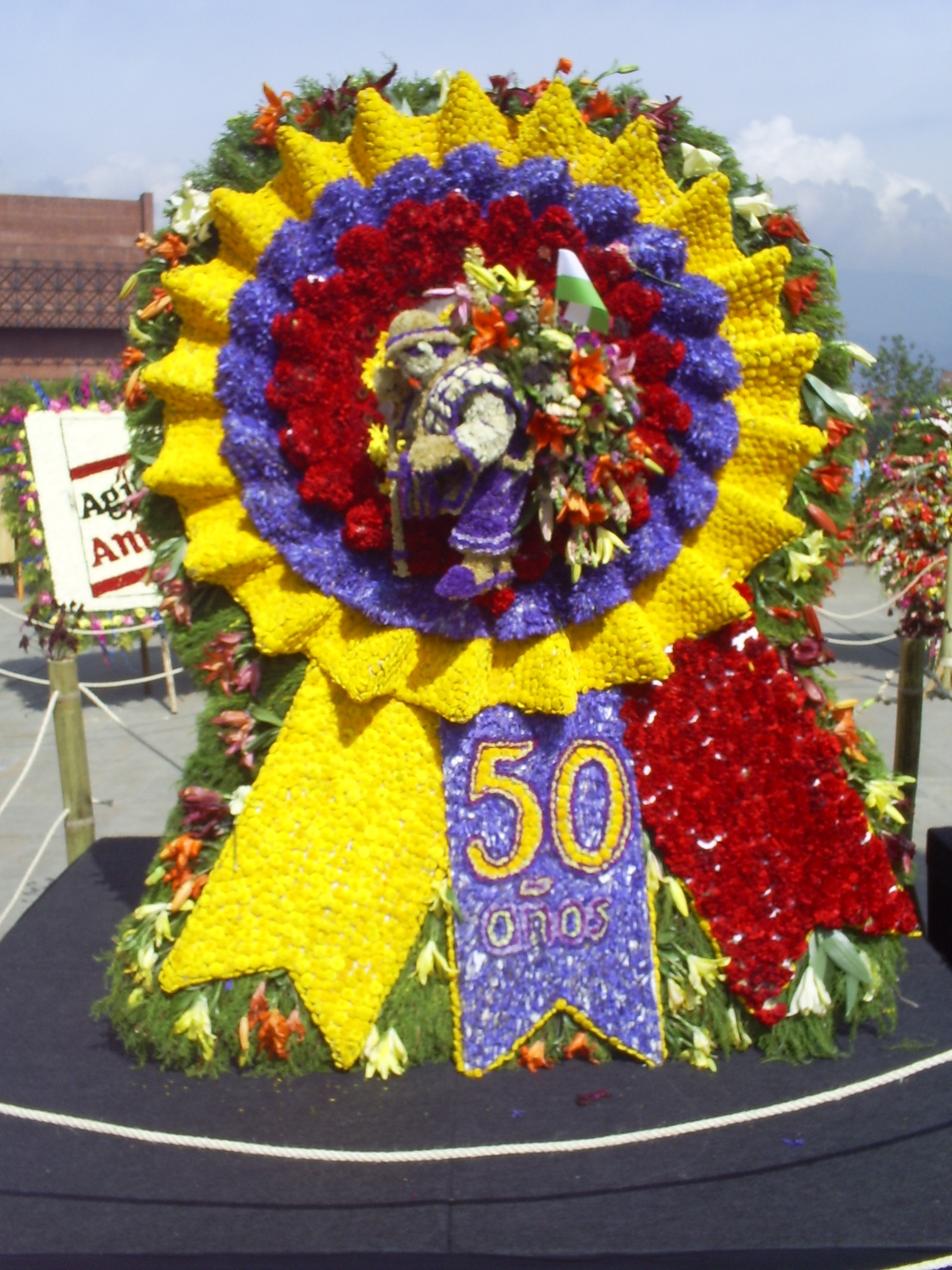
Float in the 2007 Festival of Flowers in Medellin, Colombia

A flower parade is a parade in which the floats, vehicles, boats, participants, animals and other things are decorated or covered in flowers. Often there are other elements like marching bands and people in costumes. Flower parades are held in several countries, many of which celebrate the forthcoming of the seasons. The oldest flower parade dates back to the 1800s.

The culture of flower and fruit parades in the Netherlands is inscribed with the International Representative List of Intangible Cultural Heritage of Humanity of Unesco.

== Europe ==
- Bloemencorso Flower Parade[s], located in the Netherlands.
- Corsos fleuris are held in some towns in France, including Saumur, Firminy, Luchon, and Selestat. The town of Selestat hosts a parade of Dahlia covered floats, and the floats themes change each year.
- Jersey Battle of Flowers (Channel Islands). The first staging of this parade dates back to 1902 in honor of the Royal Coronation for King Edward VII and Queen Alexandra. The name "Battle of Flowers" originates from the tradition to throw torn out flowers and petals to a lady from the crowd with hopes of receiving a flower back.
- Spalding Flower Parade (UK). The origins on the parade date back to the 1920s. The final Spalding flower parade was held for 55 years until 2013.
- Laredo, Battle of Flowers (Spain). The parade is celebrated around the Alameda Miramar, which is located in Laredo’s central park. The parade originated during August of 1908 and it is said to be celebration of a farewell to summer.
- Valencia, Virgen de los Desamparados (Spain). During this festival a floral offering is made to the Virgen de los Desamparados. It has been a tradition since 1945 and lasts for two days in the Plaza De La Virgen. Many of the offerings are baskets full of flowers or allegorical offerings.
- Madeira Flower Festival [Festa da Flor] (Portugal). The festival has been held since 1979 and is a celebration of Springs forthcoming. It is currently held in the city of Funchal, Portugal which takes place from April 23 to May 24th. There are several activities and ceremonies that take place during the festival: "The Wall of Hope" ceremony which takes place at the Praça do Município hosts thousands of children who are traditionally dressed to build a wall full of decorative flower mural, its essence is a calling for peace in the world. During the ceremony children release doves and perform a show for bystanders. The "Allegorical Parade" begins May 3 and it is where the floats are showcased with various specious of flowers decorating the floats. The "Flower Concerts" are held on May 14 to May 17 and take place at the gardens of the Madeira island. The purpose of these four musical concerns and to keep the entertainment and festivities alive. May 21 to May 24 hold the last of the Madeira Flower Festival and "Floral Sculptures" are displayed at Avenida Sá Carneiro, right next to the Funchal Pier.
- Ventimiglia Battaglia di Fiori (Italy)
- Blumenkorsos are held in several towns in Germany, including Bad Ems, Legden and Rheydt
- Blumenkorsos are also held in a few towns in Austria, including Tirol (Ebbs and Kufstein)
- Debrecen Flower Carnival - festival in Debrecen, Hungary

== South America ==
- La Feria de Las Flores (Medellín, Colombia) held since 1957 and also known as Festival of the Flowers

== North America ==
- Tournament of Roses Parade (Pasadena, California). The first parade took place in 1890, where the Valley Hunt Club members were the first sponsors of the Tournament of Roses. Horses were decorated by parade of flowers and the entertainment was chariot races, jousting, foot races and tug-of-war. Around the 1920s, the 31st parade introduced motor driven floats, which then became the parade that is known now. The Wrigley mansion was given to the City of Pasadena by William Wrigley Jr. to use as the Tournament of Roses headquarters in 1959. The Rose Parade is currently held every January 1 or most commonly known as New Year's Day. The parade runs for 5 1/2 miles down Colorado Blvd. There are four types of entries to the parade: Floral-decorated floats through a participated corporation, municipality or a non-profit organization, equestrian units, bands, and Tournament Entries.
- Grand Floral Parade at the Portland Rose Festival (Portland, Oregon)
- Battle of Flowers Parade at the Fiesta San Antonio (San Antonio, Texas)
- Grand Floral Street Parade at the Daffodil Festival (Pierce County, Washington)
- Various floral parades are held in Hawaii on Kamehameha Day and during the Aloha Festivals

Tyler Texas Rose Festival parade Tyler Rose Festival (Tyler Texas)

== Asia ==
- Chiang Mai Flower Festival (Chiang Mai, Thailand). This festival is hosted for the first three days in the month of February. The city is named "the Rose of The North" due to the colorful carnivals and flower festival. There are several activities to participate or watch in such as; The Flower Festival Queen, prize blooms on display, and landscaping projects.
- Panagbenga Festival (Baguio, Philippines). The word Panagbenga means "the season of blooming", the parade features flowers that celebrate the city of Baugio's spirit and dancers with flower decorated costumes.

== Australasia ==
- Grand Central Floral Parade, Toowoomba Carnival of Flowers (Toowoomba, Queensland)
- Alexandra Blossom Festival (Alexandra, New Zealand). Marks the arrival of Spring and to commend the community spirit of the town of Alexandra. Beginning in March 1957 the Alexandra Junior Chamber of Commerce proposed the festival to be held for a week during September, and the proceeds from the week-long festival were to go towards the funding of new swimming baths
- Tesselar Tulip Festival (Silvan, Victoria). The Tulip Festival is held every spring and started in 1954 in Silvan, Victoria a town in Australia. This tourist attraction showcases more than 120 varieties of tulips on a 55-acre farm in the Dandenong Ranges. The farms and festival were founded by Dutch immigrants Cees and Johanna Tesselaar when they arrived in 1939. The festival continues to attract more tourists every year as it evolves.
