= Capture of Amboina =

- Part of Dutch–Portuguese War
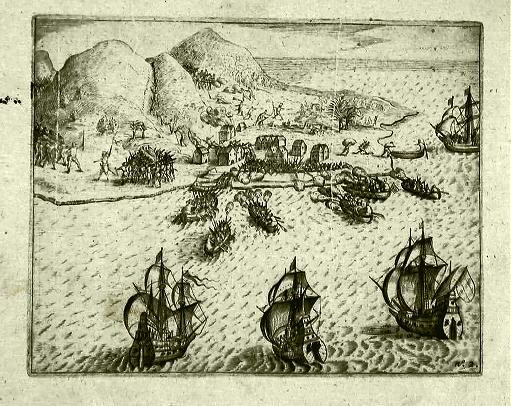
- The Dutch and Hitu defeated the Portuguese at Amboina in 1605. Engraved by Isaac Commelin in 1645.
Date	22 February 1605
Location	Fort Nossa Senhora de Anunciada in Amboyna
Result	Dutch victory

Belligerents
Dutch East India Company	Portuguese Empire

Commanders and leaders
(Dutch East India Company) Steven van der Hagen	(Portuguese Empire) Gaspar de Mello (surrendered)

The Capture of Amboina was the capture of the Portuguese fort Nossa Senhora de Anunciada in Amboina by the Dutch East India Company, under admiral Steven van der Hagen. The Portuguese governor of Ambon Gaspar de Melo surrendered the fort on 22 February 1605 to the Dutch forces, the fort was renamed to fort Victoria, and Ambon was placed under Dutch Control. The capture was one of the last major defeat of the Portuguese in the Moluccas.

== Capture ==
The Portuguese presence in the Moluccas has already deteriorated since the loss of Ternate in 1575, they had to face serious threats from both the new emerging regional power from the Sultanate of Ternate, and the Dutch East India Company (VOC) that had been established in 1602. In the earlier years, the VOC had no controlled territories other than Amboina which they captured in 1605.

In 1603, the Dutch East India Company admiral, Steven van der Hagen launched his second voyage to the Indies, van der Hagen's fleet consisting of 12 fleets left Holland in December 1603, visited several ports of the Malabar coast and Ceylon, stopped at Aceh and Bantam before arriving in Amboina in 1605. In February 1605, van der Hagen allied with the raja of Hitu in an improvised attack and capture of Amboina, when 14 Dutch sail appeared before Amboina on 22 February 1605, the last Portuguese commander of Amboina, Gaspar de Mello quickly surrendered the castle of Nossa Senhora de Anunciada with everything they had there under a treaty, leaving Amboina under Dutch control, and after capturing the Portuguese fort in Amboina, van der Hagen's fleet was divided. The capture of Amboina and Tidore was described in a 1645 journal titled Begin ende voortgangh van de Vereenighde Nederlantsche Geoctroyeerde Oost-Indische Compagnie by a Dutch historian, Isaac Commelin.

Ambon became the headquarters of the Dutch East India Company (VOC) from 1610 to 1619 until the founding of Batavia, now Jakarta, by the Dutch.
