= Governorate of Ambon =

Colony of the Dutch East India Company from 1605 to 1796

Coordinates: 3°40′0″S 128°10′0″E

Governorate of Ambon Gouvernement Amboyna
- 1605–1796
- Flag Coat of arms

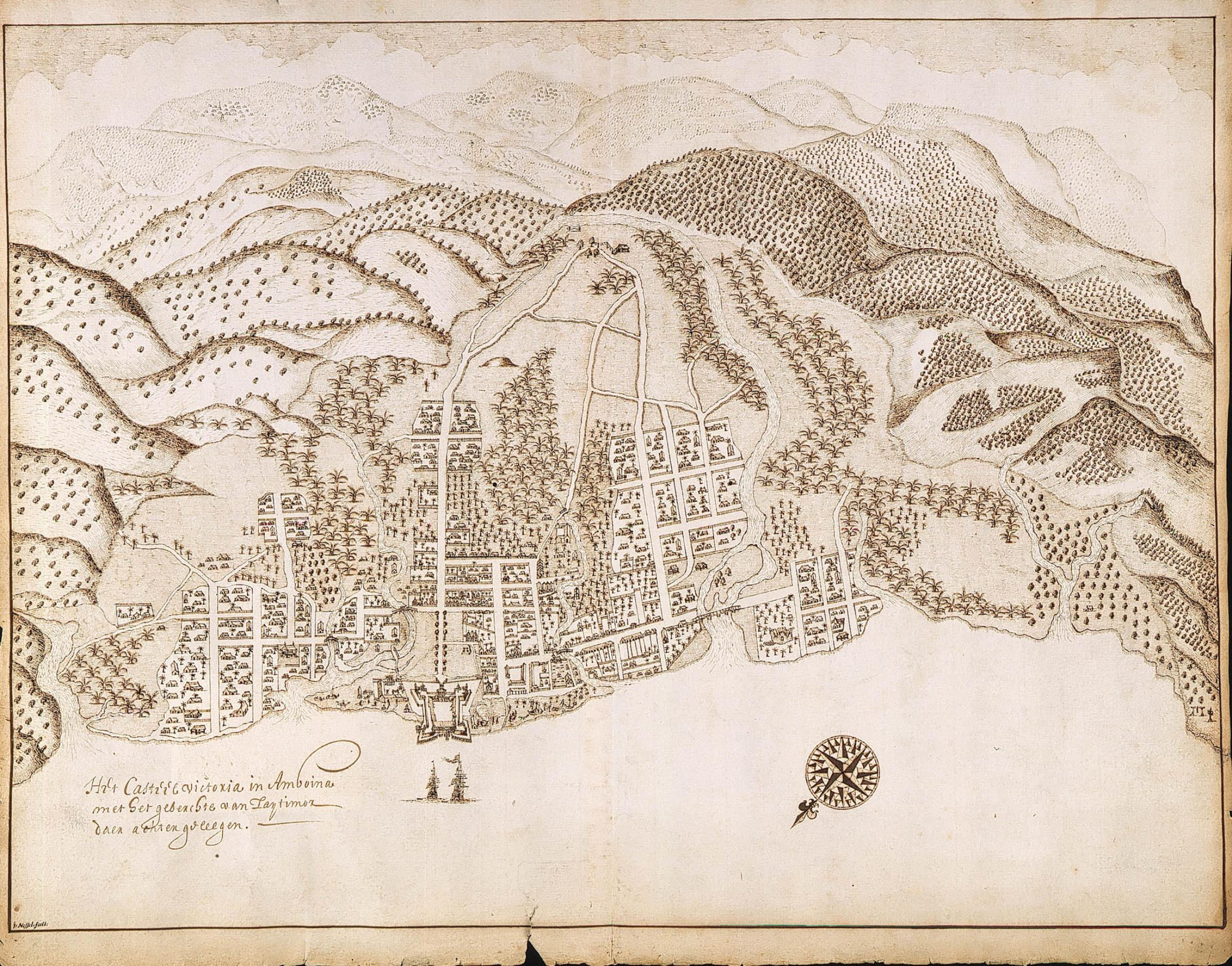
- Amboina around 1651
- Status: Dutch colony
- Capital: Fort Victoria
- Common languages: Dutch
- Governor
  - 1605–1611: Frederick de Houtman
  - 1618–1625: Herman van Speult
  - 1701–1706: Balthasar Coyett
  - 1724–1729: Stephanus Versluys
  - 1794–1796: Alexander Cornabé
- Historical era: Imperialism
  - Dutch capture: 22 February 1605
  - British takeover: 1796
Preceded by	Succeeded by
Portuguese Empire	Bencoolen

Ambon was a governorate of the Dutch East India Company, consisting of Ambon Island and ten neighbouring islands. Steven van der Hagen captured Fort Victoria on 22 February 1605 from the Portuguese in the name of the Dutch East India Company. Until 1619, Ambon served as the capital of the Dutch possessions in East Asia. In that year Batavia was founded to function as the staple port for the Dutch East India Company in Asia. The island was the world center of clove production until the 19th century. The Dutch prohibited the rearing of the clove-tree in all the other islands subject to their rule, in order to secure the monopoly to Ambon.

== History ==
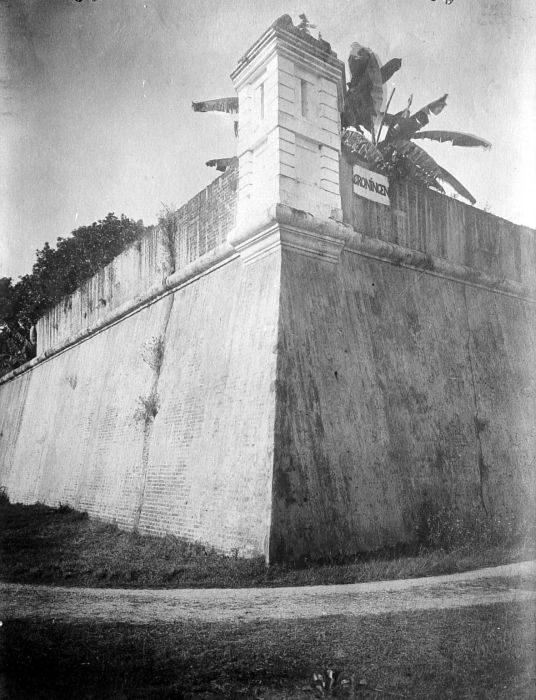
Bastion of Fort Victoria

In 1513, the Portuguese were the first Europeans to land on Ambon Island, and it became the new centre for Portuguese activities in Maluku following their expulsion from Ternate. The Portuguese, however, were regularly attacked by native Muslims on the island's northern coast, in particular Hitu, which had trading and religious links with major port cities on Java's north coast. They established a factory in 1521, but did not obtain peaceable possession of it until 1580. Indeed, the Portuguese never managed to control the local trade in spices, and failed in attempts to establish their authority over the Banda Islands, the nearby centre of nutmeg production. The creole trade language Portugis however was spoken well into the 19th century and many families still have Portuguese names and claim Portuguese ancestry.

The Portuguese were dispossessed by the Dutch on 22 February 1605, when Steven van der Hagen took over Fort Victoria without a single shot. Ambon was the headquarters of the Dutch East India Company (VOC) from 1610 to 1619 until the founding of Batavia, now Jakarta, by the Dutch. Around 1615, the English founded a settlement on the island at Cambello, which lasted until 1623.

== Amboyna massacre ==
In 1623, the Dutch uncovered a plot by VOC-employed Japanese mercenary soldiers to seize Fort Victoria and assassinate the governor, purportedly in conspiracy with the English merchants. During questioning most suspects were waterboarded. Among those who confessed, 10 VOC mercenary soldiers and 10 English East India Company employees were found guilty of treason and were executed by a local Dutch court. On request of England, the involved judges were recalled to the Netherlands and put on trial, but were finally (in 1632) judged to have acted lawfully. Decades later, Oliver Cromwell used embellished versions of this event, dubbed the "Amboyna massacre", as one of the pretexts to start both the First Anglo-Dutch War (in 1652) and the Second Anglo-Dutch War (in 1665), while John Dryden produced his tragedy Amboyna; or the Cruelties of the Dutch to the English Merchants on request of one of the English negotiators of the Secret Treaty of Dover during the Third Anglo-Dutch War. The 17th-century propaganda of a deliberate and gruesome slaughter of innocent merchants surfaces even in modern popular historical narratives.

=== Capture by the British ===
In 1795, the Batavian Republic was established with the help of French forces in the territory of the Dutch Republic. The latest stadtholder, William V, Prince of Orange, asked the British in the Kew Letters to temporarily occupy the Dutch colonies. Indeed, in 1796, British Admiral Rainier sailed to Ambon to take the colony, which was accepted by governor of Ambon, Alexander Cornabé. The territory was restored to the Dutch at the Peace of Amiens in 1802, but the Dutch East India Company had been nationalized in the meantime, which meant that Ambon become a colony of the Batavian Republic and later the Kingdom of Holland.

Ambon was retaken by the British in 1810, but once more restored to the Dutch by virtue of the Anglo-Dutch Treaty of 1814. It then remained, as part of the Dutch East Indies, a colony of the Kingdom of the Netherlands, until in 1949 Maluku was transferred to Indonesia, under agreements that Moluccans could choose or opt out of the new country. After a proclamation of independence the Moluccan islands were invaded by the Indonesian army in 1950 during the Invasion of Ambon.

== List of governors ==
- 1605–1611: Frederick de Houtman
- 1611–1615: Caspar Janszoon
- 1615–1616: Adriaen Maertensz Block
- 1616–1618: Steven van der Hagen
- 1618–1625: Herman van Speult
- 1625–1628: Jan van Gorcum
- 1628–1631: Philip Lucaszoon
- 1631–1634: Artus Gysels
- 1634–1635: Antoni van den Heuvel
- 1635–1637: Joachim Roelofsz van Deutekom
- 1637–1641: Johan Ottens
- 1642–1642: Antoni Caan
- 1642–1647: Gerard Demmer
- 1647–1651: Arnold de Vlaming van Outshoorn
- 1651–1654: Willem Verbeek
- 1654–1656: Arnold de Vlaming van Outshoorn
- 1656–1662: Jacob Hustaert
- 1662–1664: Simon Cos
- 1664–1665: Johan van Dam
- 1666–1667: Pieter Marville
- 1669–1672: Jacob Cos
- 1672–1678: Anthonio Hurdt
- 1678–1682: Robbert de Vicq
- 1682–1687: Robbert Padbrugge
- 1687–1691: Dirk de Haas
- 1691–1696: Joan Paul Schaghen
- 1697–1701: Willem van Wijngaarden
- 1701–1706: Balthasar Coyett
- 1706–1720: Adriaan van der Stel
- 1721–1725: Pieter Gabrij
- 1725–1727: Stephanus Versluys
- 1727–1733: Johannes Bernard
- 1733–1738: David Johan Bake
- 1738–1743: Jacob de Jong
- 1743–1748: Nathaniël Steinmetz
- 1748–1750: Cornelis Roosenboom
- 1750–1752: Nicolaus Jongma
- 1752–1757: Gerard Cluysenaar
- 1757–1763: Meyert Johan van Idsinga
- 1763–1763: Goderd Ludolf van Beusechem
- 1764–1767: Willem Fockens
- 1767–1770: Hendrik Breton
- 1770–1775: Johan Abraham van der Voort
- 1775–1785: Bernardus van Pleuren
- 1785–1788: Adriaan de Bock
- 1788–1794: Johan Adam Schilling
- 1794–1796: Alexander Cornabé

== See also ==
- Invasion of Ambon

== Sources ==
- Ricklefs, M.C. (1999). A History of Modern Indonesia Since c.1300 (2nd ed.). London: Macmillan. pp. 25, 28. ISBN 0-333-57689-6.
