= Herman van Speult =

Dutch merchant and governor

Herman van Speult (? – August 1626) was a merchant in service of the Dutch East India Company. Van Speult left the island Texel in 1613, heading for Bantam and arrived after a journey of ten months. He was formerly employed in Spain, "whence he came, if report be true, full of the pox." He was active as governor of Ambon from 1618 until 1625.

In 1618 he was appointed as governor of the Governorate of Ambon as the successor to Adriaen Maertensz Block and Steven van der Hagen. On 21 January 1623 had he prepared two ships for an expedition to islands near New Guinea, to map more of New Guinea, and to explore for "the South Land". The crew discovered possibly the present Jardine River and most likely Speult Land and Speult Point were named after him.

On 27 February 1623, Van Speult ordered the beheading of Gabriel Towerson, the English East India Company's chief factor or merchant at Ambon, along with nine other Englishmen, ten Japanese and a Portuguese. The men were accused of plotting to kill Van Speult and overwhelm the Dutch garrison. The incident became known as the Amboyna massacre and remained a source of tension between the two nations until late in the 17th century. Van Speult died in August 1626 in the Red Sea near Mokha.
