= Governor Coyett =

Governor Coyett may refer to:

- Balthasar Coyett (1650s–1725), Governor of Ambon from 1701 to 1706
- Frederick Coyett (1610s–1687), 12th Governor of Formosa from 1656 to 1662
