= Begin ende voortgangh van de Vereenighde Nederlantsche Geoctroyeerde Oost-Indische Compagnie =

Dutch collection of voyages

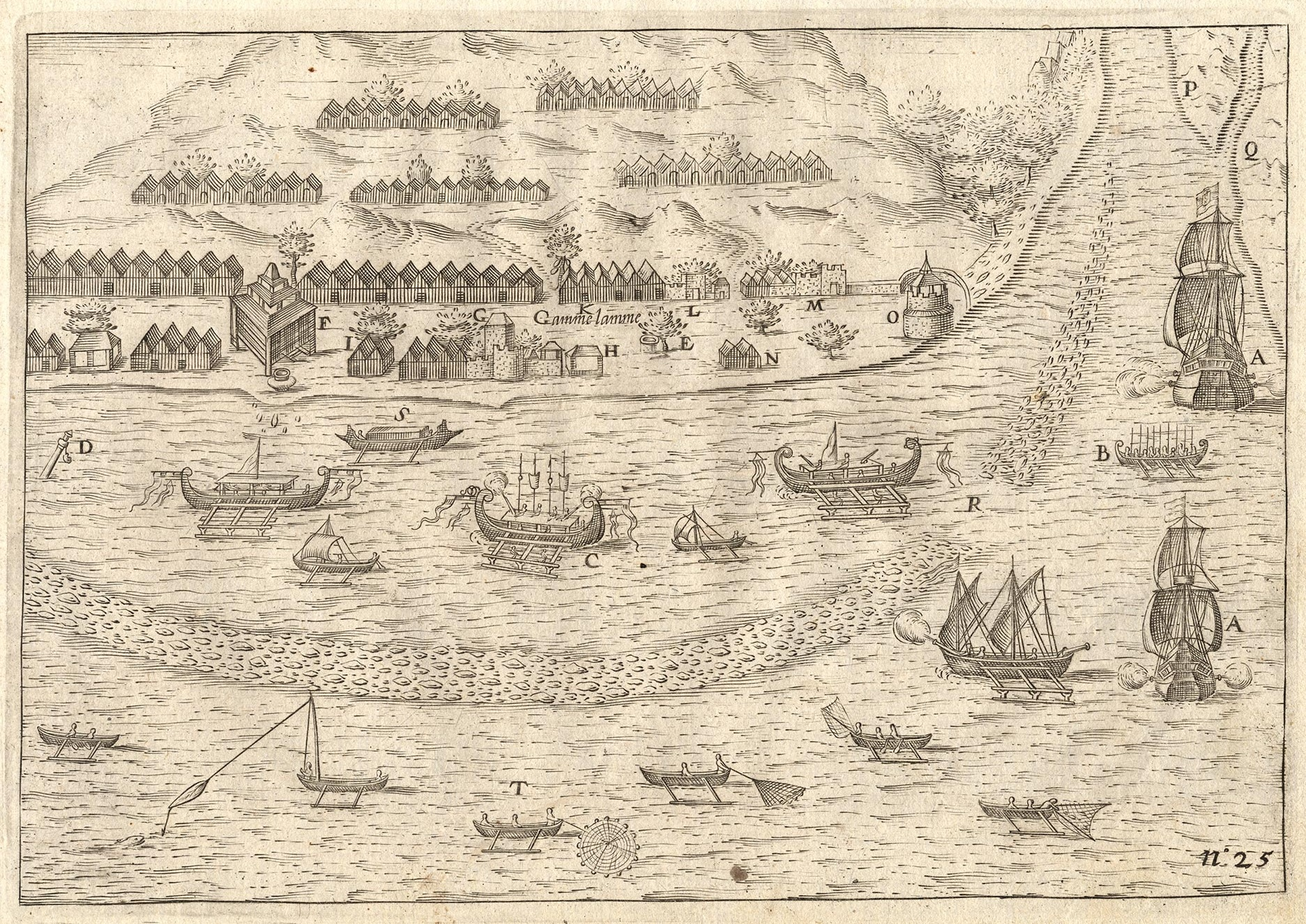
Gammelamma in the work

Begin ende voortgangh van de Vereenighde Nederlantsche Geoctroyeerde Oost-Indische Compagnie ("Beginning and progress of the United Dutch Chartered East Indian Company"), compiled by the Dutch historian Isaac Commelin (1598-1676) from Amsterdam in the middle of the 17th century, is an illustrated collection of voyages, containing the journals of 21 navigators to the East and West Indies, representing the material for any research on Dutch exploration of trading routes.

== Title ==
A fuller title is:

Begin ende voortgangh van de Vereenighde Nederlantsche geoctroyeerde Oost-Indische compagnie. Vervatende de voornaemste reysen, by de inwoonderen der selver provincien derwaerts gedaen. Alles nevens de beschrijvinghen der rijcken, eylanden, havenen, revieren [sic], stroomen, rheeden, winden, diepten en ondiepten [...] met veele discoursen verrijckt: nevens eenighe koopere platen verciert. Nut ende dienstigh alle curieuse, ende andere zee-varende liefhebbers. Met dry besondere tafels ofte registers, in twee delen verdeelt: waer van 'teerste begrijpt, veerthien voyagien, den meeren-deelen voor desen noyt in 't licht geweest [...].

(roughly translated)

Beginning and progress of the United Dutch Chartered East Indian Company. Containing the principal voyages made thither by the inhabitants of the said provinces. Together with descriptions of the kingdoms, islands, harbours, rivers, streams, roadsteads, winds, depths and shallows […] enriched with many discourses; and adorned with several copper engravings.Useful and serviceable to all the curious, and to other lovers of seafaring.With three special tables or indexes, divided into two parts: of which the first comprises fourteen voyages, for the most part never before brought to light […].

== History ==
The third edition was published in 1646 in Amsterdam (Joannes Janssonius). It contains contributions by 21 authors and is the most important compilation on the history of the Dutch East India Company. The work is illustrated with many maps and plates. Some unpublished accounts are printed in it for the first time. It is a valuable record of exploration during the 16th and 17th century, the history of early Pacific exploration as well as for the development of the East Indies. Among the voyages are those of the Arctic discoveries of Heemskerk and Barentsz, the East-India voyages of Houtman and Van Spilbergen, the circumnavigations by Van Noort, Le Maire, Schouten and Van Spilbergen.

== Overview ==
The 21 parts are:

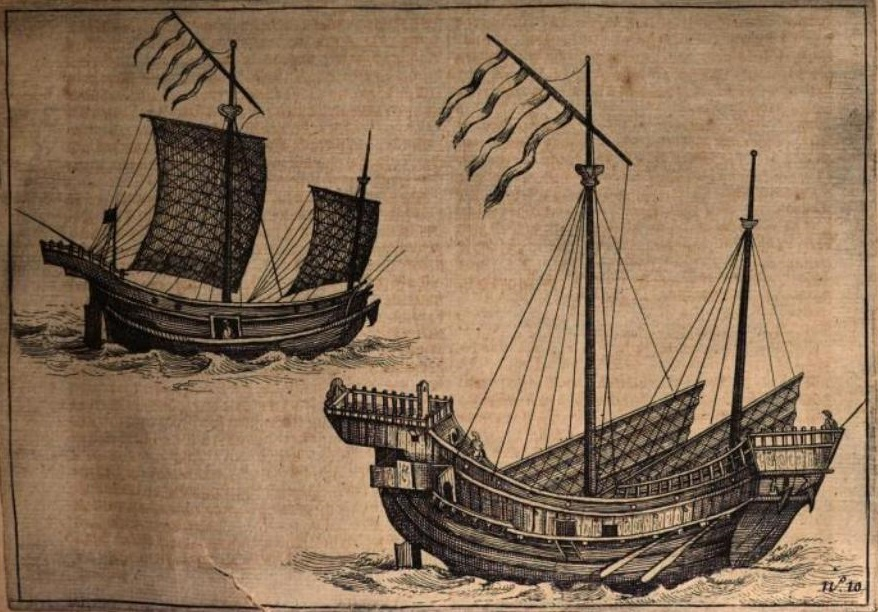
Two Chinese junks in the work

- 1 Gerrit de Veer, voyages to the north (1594-1596)
- 2 Cornelis de Houtman, first Dutch voyage to the East Indies (1595-1597)
- 3 Jacob Cornelisz van Neck and Wybrant van Warwijck, first voyage to the East Indies (1598-1600), with appendix Javanese-Malay dictionary
- 4 Sebald de Weert, voyage around the world (1598-1599), described by Barent Jansz (Potgieter)
- 5 Olivier van Noort, voyage around the world (1598-1601)
- 6 Pieter Both and Paulus van Caerden, voyage to the East Indies (1599-1601)
- 7 Jacob Cornelis van Neck, second voyage to the East Indies (1600-1604)
- 8 Voyages to the East Indies under Steven van der Haghen (1599-1601), Cornelis Pietersz and Guillaume Senechal (1600-1602), Jacob van Heemskerk (1601-1603)
- 9 Wolfert Harmensz, voyage to the East Indies (1601-1603)
- 10 Joris van Spilbergen, voyage to the East Indies (1601-1604)
- 11 Wijbrand van Warwijck and Sebald de Weert, voyage to the East Indies (1602-1604)
- 12 Steven van der Haghen, second voyage to the East Indies (1603-1606)
- 13 Cornelis Matelief, voyage to the East Indies (1605-1608)
- 14 Paulus van Caerden, voyage to the East Indies (1606-1609)
- 15 Pieter Willemsz Verhoeff, voyage to the East Indies (1607-1616)
- 16 Pieter van den Broecke, voyages to West Africa and Asia (1605-1630)
- 17 Johan van Twist, description of Gujerat (1638)
- 18 Joris van Spilbergen, voyage around the world (1614-1618); Willem Cornelisz Schouten and Jacob Le Maire, voyage around the world (1615-1617)
- 19 Jacques L'Hermite, voyage around the world (Nassau fleet) (1623-1626); with appendix by Pedro de Madriga, description of Peru and Chile
- 20 Wijbrant Schram, voyage and battle with Claes Compaen (1626); Zeyger van Rechteren, voyage to the East Indies (1628-1632); appendix sea battle of Cornelisz. off Goa (1639)
- 21 Hendrick Hagenaer, voyage to the East Indies (1631-1637), François Caron, description of Japan (1636), Reyer Gysbertsx, history of the martyrs in Japan; Joost Schouten, description of Siam (1636)

== Editions ==
- Amsterdam 1645 (first edition)
- Isaac Commelin (ed.): Begin ende voortgangh van de Vereenighde Nederlantsche Geoctroyeerde Oost-Indische Compagnie. Vervatende de voornaemste reysen/ by de inwoonderen der selver provincien derwaerts gedaen. Joannes Janssonius, Amsterdam 1646. 21 parts (third edition)
- Facsimile edition. Amsterdam 1969. 4 volumes

== Bibliography ==
- John Landwehr: VOC. A bibliography of publications relating to the Dutch East India Company 1602-1800. HES Publishers, Utrecht 1991
- Sabin 14959 = Joseph Sabin: A Dictionary of Books Relating to America, vol. 4, 2022, p. 316
