= Still Life with a Turkey Pie =

1627 painting by Pieter Claesz

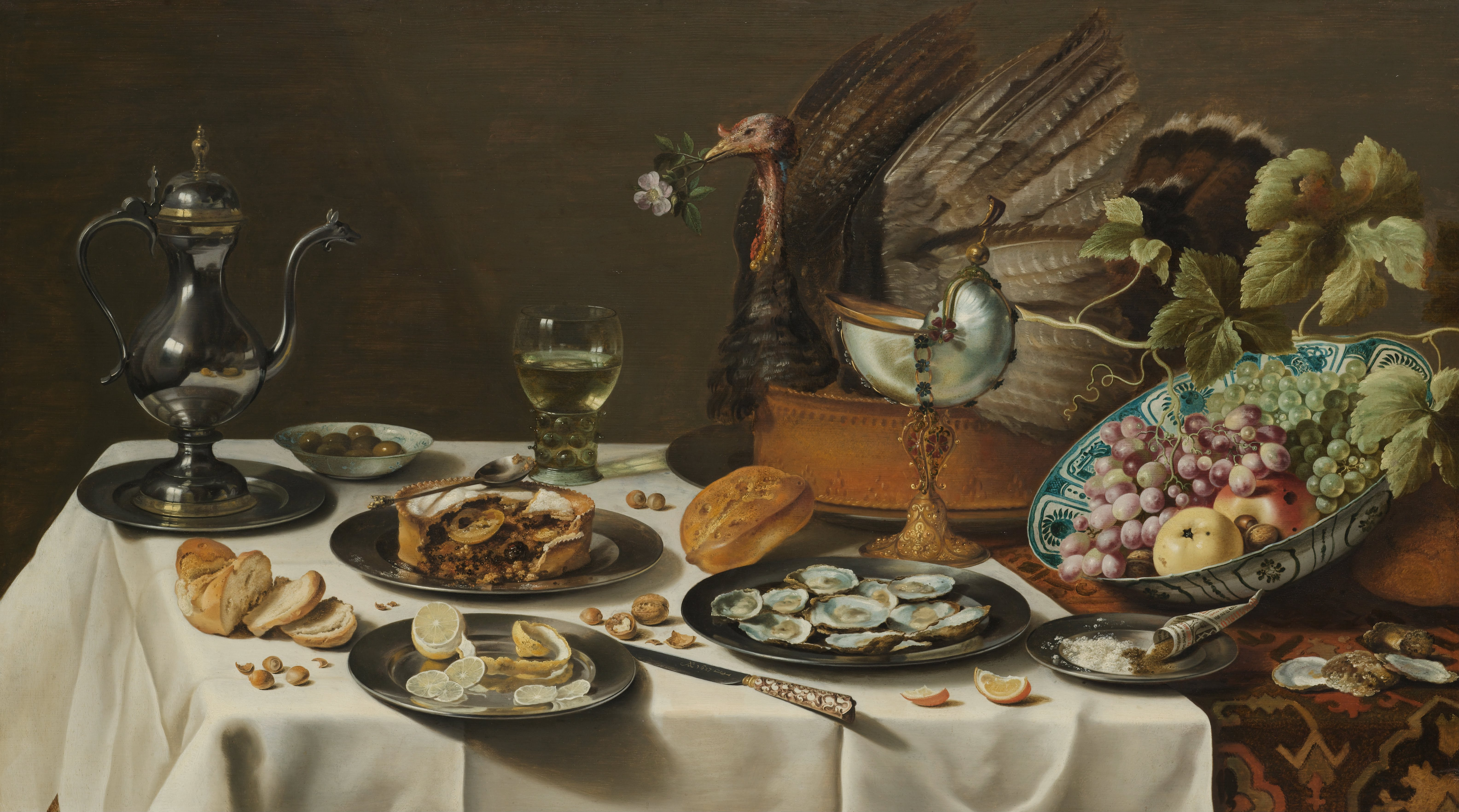
Still Life with a Turkey Pie (1627) by Pieter Claesz

Still Life with a Turkey Pie is a 1627 still life painting by the Dutch painter Pieter Claesz, now in the Rijksmuseum in Amsterdam. It was in the collection of Baroness Cecilia-Maria van Pallandt at Keukenhof Castle from 1881. Her descendants sold it to the Hague-based art dealer S.Neistad in 1974 for 300,000 guilders. He sold it onto its present owners later the same year for 832,000 guilders.

== Sources ==
- http://hdl.handle.net/10934/RM0001.collect.8143
