= Bank (geography) =

Land alongside a body of water

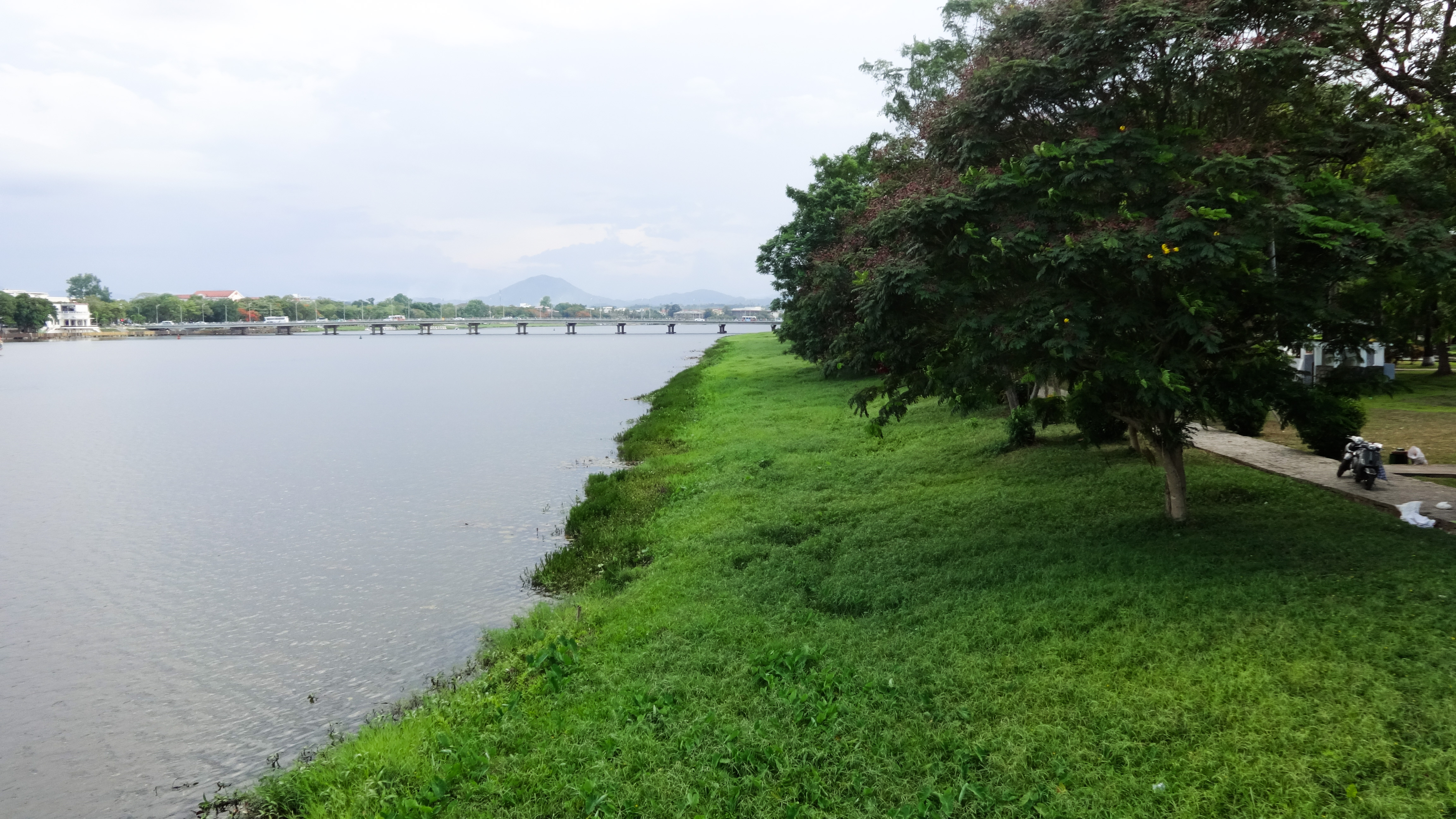
A natural grass bank of the Perfume River in Huế, Vietnam

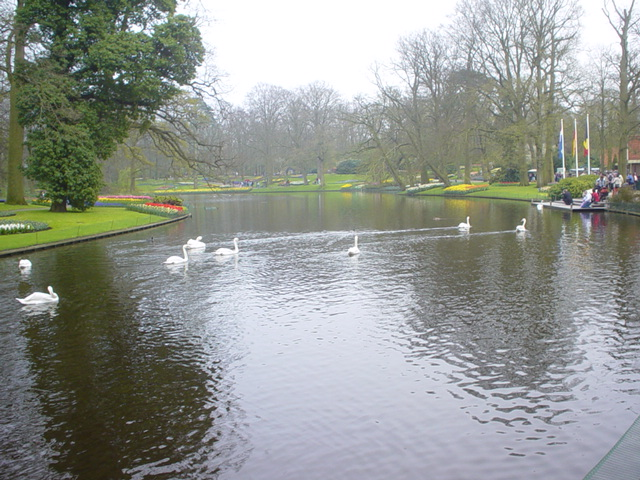
An artificial lake with grass banks in Keukenhof, Netherlands

In geography, a bank is the land alongside a body of water. Different structures are referred to as "banks" in different fields of geography.

In limnology, a "stream bank" or "river bank" is the terrain alongside the bed of a river, creek, or stream. The bank consists of the sides of the channel, backwater between which the flow is confined. Stream banks are of particular interest in fluvial geography, which studies the processes associated with rivers and streams and the deposits and landforms created by them. Bankfull discharge is a discharge great enough to fill the channel and overtop the banks.

Diagram of a river's left and right banks

The descriptive terms left bank and right bank refer to the perspective of an observer looking downstream; a well-known example of this being the southern left bank and the northern right bank of the river Seine defining parts of Paris. The shoreline of ponds, swamps, estuaries, reservoirs, or lakes are also of interest in limnology and are sometimes referred to as banks. The grade of all these banks or shorelines can vary from vertical to a shallow slope.

In freshwater ecology, banks are of interest as the location of riparian habitats. Riparian zones occur along upland and lowland river and stream beds. The ecology around and depending on a marsh, swamp, slough, or estuary, sometimes called a bank, is likewise studied in freshwater ecology.

Banks are also of interest in navigation, where the term can refer either to a barrier island or a submerged plateau, such as an ocean bank. A barrier island is a long narrow island composed of sand and forming a barrier between an island lagoon or sound and the ocean. A submerged plateau is a relatively flat topped elevation of the sea floor at shallow depth — generally less than 200 metres (660 ft) — typically on the continental shelf or near an island.

== See also ==
- Coast
- Embankment (earthworks)
- Levee
