= Amboyna massacre =

1623 killings in Indonesia

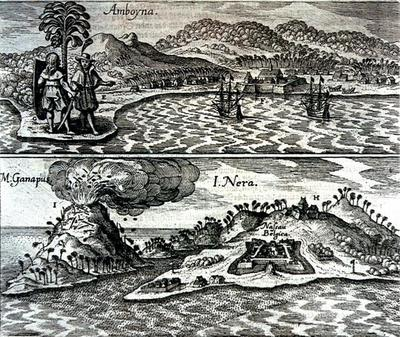
The Dutch and English enclaves at Amboyna (top) and Banda-Neira (bottom). 1655 engraving.

The Amboyna massacre (also known as the Amboyna trial) was the 1623 torture and execution on Ambon Island (present-day Ambon, Maluku, Indonesia) of twenty-one men, including ten in the service of the English East India Company, as well as Japanese and Portuguese traders and a Portuguese man, by agents of the Dutch East India Company (VOC), on accusations of treason. It was the result of the intense rivalry between the East India companies of England and the United Provinces in the spice trade and remained a source of tension between the two nations until late in the 17th century.

== Background ==
From its inception, the Dutch Republic was at war with the Spanish crown (which was in a dynastic union with the Portuguese crown from 1580 to 1640). In 1598 the king of Spain embargoed Dutch trade with Portugal, and so the Dutch went looking for spices themselves in the areas that had been apportioned to Portugal under the Treaty of Tordesillas. In February, 1605 Steven van der Hagen, admiral of the Dutch East India Company (VOC), conquered the Portuguese fortress of Victoria at Amboyna, thereby taking over the Portuguese trading interests at Victoria. Like other European traders they tried to obtain a local monopsony in the spice trade by keeping out the factors of other European countries by force of arms. This especially caused strife with the English East India Company while the actions of the interloper Sir Edward Michelborne incensed the Dutch. Unavoidably, the national governments got involved, and this threatened the congenial relations between James I of England and the Dutch States General.

King James I and the Netherlands States General caused the two warring companies to conclude a Treaty of Defence in London in 1619 creating cooperation in the East Indies. The market in spices was divided between them in a fixed proportion of two to one (both companies having legal monopolies in their home markets); a Council of Defence was instituted in Batavia that was to govern the merchants of both companies; most important, those merchants were now to share trading posts peacefully, though each company was to retain and police the posts it had occupied. The Dutch interpreted this latter provision to mean that each company had legal jurisdiction over the employees of both companies in the places it administered. Contrarily, the English maintained, on the basis of the arbitration-article 30 of the treaty, that only the Council of Defence would have jurisdiction over employees of the "other" company. This proved to be an important difference of opinion in the ensuing events.

== Massacre ==
Despite the treaty, relations between the two companies remained tense. Both parties developed numerous grievances against each other including bad faith, non-performance of treaty-obligations, and "underhand" attempts to undercut each other in the relations with the indigenous rulers with whom they dealt. In the Amboyna region, local VOC-governor Herman van Speult had trouble, in late 1622, with the Sultan of Ternate, who showed signs of intending to switch allegiance to the Spanish. Van Speult suspected the English of secretly stirring up these troubles.

As a result, the Dutch at Amboyna became suspicious of the English traders that shared the trading post with them. These vague suspicions became concrete when in February 1623 one of the Japanese mercenary soldiers (ronin, or masterless samurai in the employ of the VOC) was caught in the act of spying on the defenses of the fortress Victoria. When questioned under torture the soldier confessed to a conspiracy with other Japanese mercenaries to seize the fortress and assassinate the governor. He also implicated the head of the English factors, Gabriel Towerson, as a member of the conspiracy. Subsequently, Towerson and the other English personnel in Amboyna and adjacent islands were arrested and questioned. In most, but not all cases, torture was used during the questioning. Torture consisted of having water poured over the head, around which a cloth was draped, bringing the interrogated repeatedly close to suffocation (this is today called waterboarding). This was the usual interrogative procedure in the Dutch East Indies at the time. According to the English version of events, even more sadistic forms of torture were used. The accused conspirators were stretched on the rack, subjected to flame, stabbed, and several had their limbs blown off by gunpowder. This was later disputed by the Dutch. According to Dutch trial records, most suspects confessed that they were guilty as charged, with or without being tortured. Since the accusation was treason, those who had confessed (confession being necessary for conviction under Roman Dutch law) were sentenced to death by a court consisting of the governor and Council of the VOC at Amboina. However, four of the English and two of the Japanese condemned were subsequently pardoned. Consequently, ten Englishmen, nine Japanese and one Portuguese (the latter being employees of the VOC), were executed. On 9 March 1623 they were beheaded, and the head of the English captain, Gabriel Towerson, was impaled on a pole for all to see. The incident ended any hope of Anglo-Dutch cooperation in the area, a goal that both governments had been pursuing for several years, and marked the beginning of Dutch ascendancy in the Indies.

== Aftermath ==
In the summer of 1623, the Englishmen who had been pardoned and acquitted sailed to Batavia and complained to the Dutch governor-general Pieter de Carpentier and the Council of Defence about the Amboyna affair, which they said was a false accusation based upon a fantasy and that the confessions had been obtained only by severe torture. When they were unable to obtain redress in Batavia, they traveled to England, accompanied by the English factor at Batavia. Their story caused an uproar in England. The directors of the EIC asked that the English government demand reparations from the VOC and exemplary punishment of the Amboyna judges from the Dutch government.

According to the English ambassador Sir Dudley Carleton, the version of events as he presented it also caused much anger at the VOC in Dutch government circles. However, the VOC soon presented its version of events which contradicted the English version in essential respects. The Dutch States General proposed a joint Anglo-Dutch commission of inquiry to establish the facts, but the suggestion was rejected by the English as too time-consuming. The Dutch did not want to execute the culprits of the torture and executions summarily as the English wished, so the States General commissioned an inquiry by delegated judges from the highest courts in the Dutch republic to investigate the matter. The Amboyna judges were recalled from the East-Indies and put under house arrest.

The trial progressed slowly because the court of inquiry wished to cross-examine the English witnesses. The English government balked at this demand because it felt it could not compel the witnesses to travel to the Republic. Besides, as the English based their case on the incompetence of the court to try employees of the EIC (according to the English interpretation of the Treaty of Defence), the executions were ipso facto illegal in the English view and, therefore, constituted a judicial murder. This contention could be decided without an examination of the witnesses. The Dutch, however, maintained that the court at Amboyna had been competent and therefore concentrated their inquiry on possible misconduct of the judges.

The English witnesses traveled to the Dutch republic in 1630 with Sir Henry Vane the Elder. They were made available to the court under restrictive conditions. The draft-verdict of the court (an acquittal of the accused) was presented to the new English king Charles I in 1632 for approval (as agreed beforehand by the two governments). It was rejected, but the accused judges were released by the Dutch authorities.

As part of Treaty of Westminster (1654) which ended the First Anglo-Dutch War (1652–1654), a binational arbitration committee was established which ordered that reparations be paid by the VOC to the heirs of the English victims of the massacre. Towerson's heirs and others received £3,615 and the EIC £85,000 from the VOC.

== War of pamphlets ==
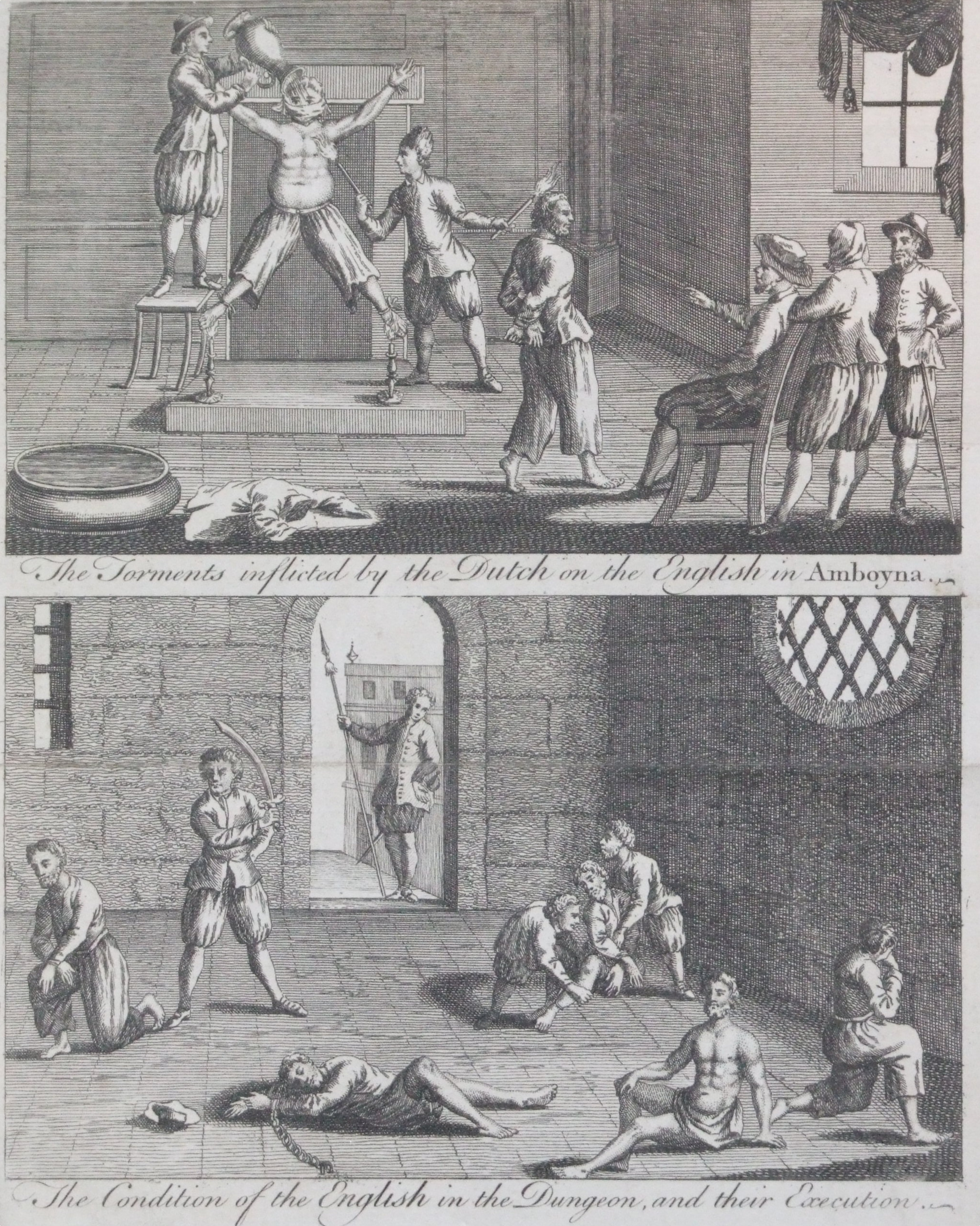
Torture of the English by the Dutch according to the English account

The East India Company was unhappy with the outcome, and in 1632 its directors published an exhaustive brochure, comprising all the relevant papers, with extensive comments and rebuttals of the Dutch position. The Dutch had already sought to influence public opinion with an anonymous pamphlet, probably authored by its secretary, Willem Boreel in 1624. At the time, ambassador Carleton had procured its suppression as a "libel" by the States General. However, an English minister in Flushing, John Winge, inadvertently translated it and sent it to England, where it displeased the East India Company.

The East India Company brochure contained the gruesome details of the tortures, as related in its original "Relation". The massacre was used as casus belli for the First Anglo-Dutch War, and the brochure was reprinted as "A Memento for Holland" (1652). The Dutch lost the war and were forced to accept a condition in the 1654 Treaty of Westminster, calling for the exemplary punishment of any surviving culprits. However, no culprits appear to have been still alive at the time. Moreover, after arbitration on the basis of the treaty, the heirs of the English victims were awarded a total of £3615 in compensation.

The brochure and its allegations also played a role at the start of the Second Anglo-Dutch War. One of the casus belli used for the annexation of the Dutch colony New Netherland was the Amboyna Massacre. The Treaty of Breda (1667) ending this war appeared to have finally settled the matter.

However, during the Third Anglo-Dutch War, the matter was again raised in a propagandistic context. John Dryden wrote a play, entitled "Amboyna or the Cruelties of the Dutch to the English Merchants", apparently at the behest of his patron who had been one of the chief negotiators of the Secret treaty of Dover that caused England's entry into that war. The play embellishes the affair by attributing the animus of Governor Van Speult against Gabriel Towerson to an amorous rivalry between the (fictitious) son of the governor and Towerson over an indigenous princess. After the son rapes the princess, Towerson kills the son in a duel. The governor then takes his revenge in the form of the massacre.

Jonathan Swift refers to the massacre in Book 3, Chapter 11 of Jonathan Swift's novel Gulliver's Travels (1726). Lemuel Gulliver pretends to be a "Hollander" and boards a Dutch ship named the Amboyna when he leaves Japan. He conceals from the crew the fact that he has not performed the ceremony demanded by the Japanese of "trampling upon the Crucifix" because, "if the secret should be discovered by my countrymen, the Dutch, they would cut my throat in the voyage."

== See also ==
- History of Indonesia
- Dutch conquest of the Banda Islands
- British invasion of the Spice Islands
