= Alexander Cornabé =

Alexander Cornabé (Leiden, c1737 — Georgetown (Penang Island) 17 June 1813) served in the Dutch East India Company (VOC) and eventually became governor and director first of Ternate and then of Amboina in the Moluccas. Cornabé was the last governor of Amboina under the VOC.

== Early life ==
Alexander Cornabé was born in Leiden circa 1737 as the son of Pierre Cornabé (Vevey (Vaud, Switzerland), 22 October 1703 — Leiden, 29 January 1773) and Elisabeth Le Cointe (Leiden, c1699 — Leiden, 1778), who married in Rijnsburg on 11 November 1731. His grandfather Pierre Cornabé came from Gien-sur-Loire (Loiret, France).

== Career ==
Cornabé sailed on 15 June 1761, as a sergeant in the service of the VOC with the ship 'Voorland' to the Indies and arrived at Batavia on 14 March 1762. He rose through various ranks and functions at the VOC and was, among other things, chief of Timor 1766-, resident of Tegal 1770–1777, governor 1780- and then governor and director of Ternate until 1793, and governor and director of Ambon from 16 September 1794. On 17 February 1796, he transferred his authority on Ambon to the British Admiral P. Rainier.

== Personal life ==
He married first in Batavia in 1765 to Agatha Catharina Houting (1734–1784) from Monnickendam, then in Ternate in 1786 to Margaretha Theodora Amelia Durr (1769-?) from Ternate. This marriage was dissolved by divorce, after which she remarried in Ternate in 1806 to Jan Frederik During.

From the second marriage he had two sons and three daughters.

== Literature ==
- Drs. R.G. de Neve, "The authorities at the foreign offices in Asia from 1795 until the English conquest of Java", De Indische Navorscher, 8 (1995), 133–166. ISSN 0924-0012.
