= Pieter van Anraedt =

Dutch Golden Age painter

Pieter van Anraedt ca.1635 – 13 April 1678) was a Dutch Golden Age painter of history scenes and portraits.

== Biography ==
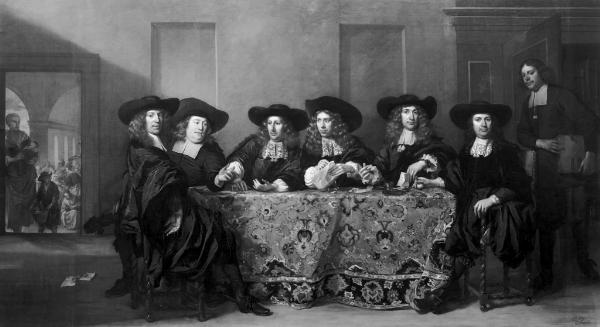
Regents of the O.Z. Huiszitten House. From left to right: Ferdinand Bol, Arnhout van der Cruijs, Anthony Hoevenaer, Jan Klaesz. van Beuningen, Caspar Commelin, Aarnout Schuyt, and the servant Symon Leeman (standing).

Little is known about the circumstances of his life. According to the RKD he was born in Utrecht (city), but trained in Deventer, where he was influenced by Gerard ter Borch. Arnold Houbraken mentions that this painter was very friendly with Jan van der Veen, a poet. He married his daughter Antonia 27 May 1641 in Deventer He moved to Amsterdam in the rampjaar 1672, when the French army attacked the city. Then he won a commission to paint the regents of the Oudezijds huiszitten house on Leprozengracht. This piece was highly admired by Houbraken in 1718, but attributed to Bol, although it is signed and dated. Soon after painting this group portrait, Anraedt returned to Deventer, where he died.

== Gallery ==
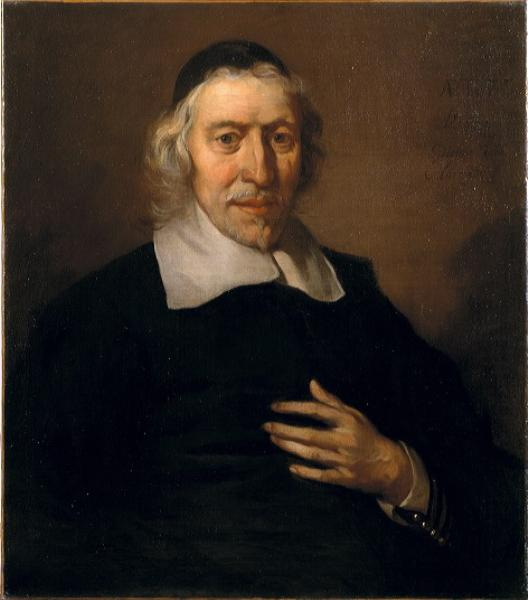
Portrait of Isaac Commelin, by Pieter van Anraedt

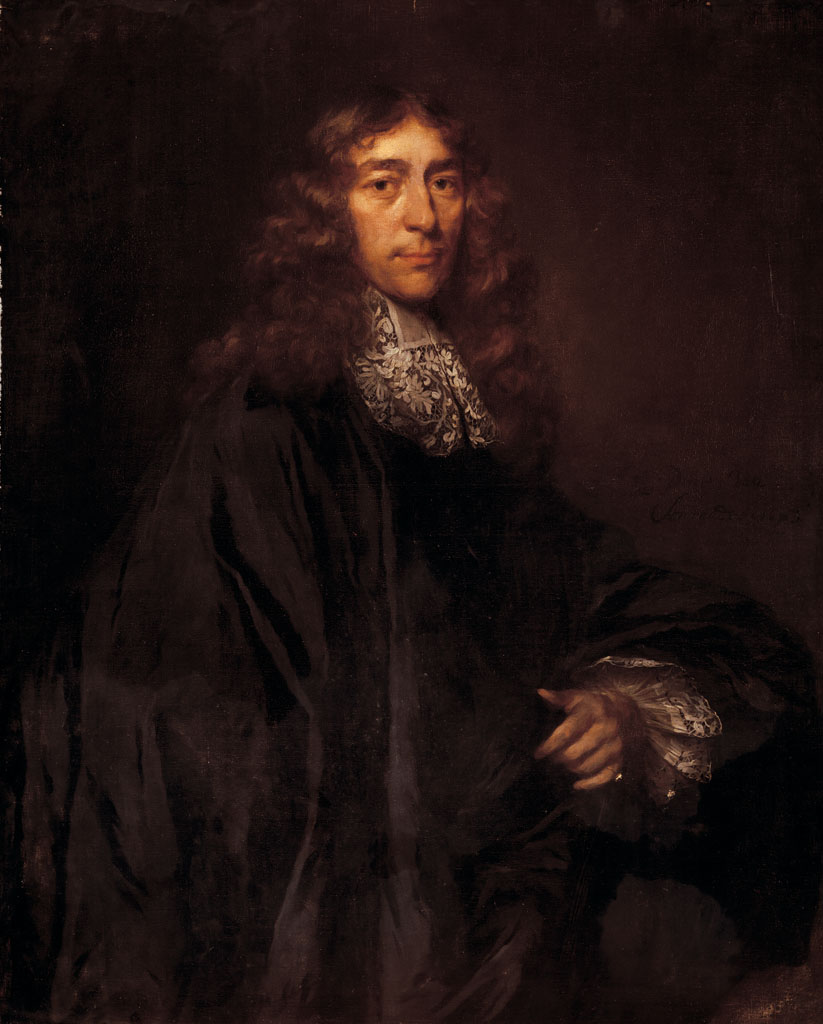
Portrait of burgomaster Lambert Reynst, by Pieter van Anraedt, 1673.
