= National Tulip Day =

Annual event in the Netherlands

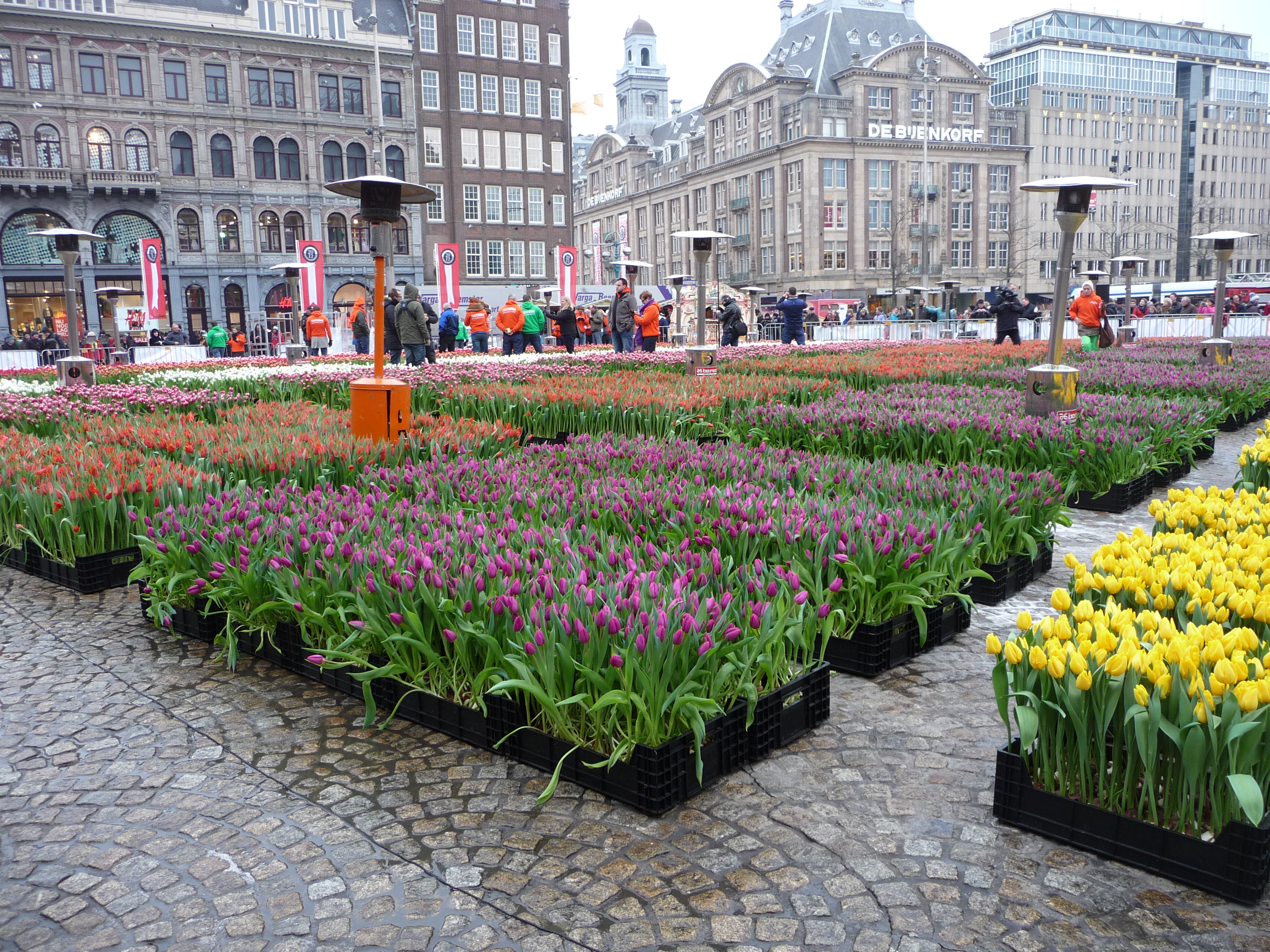
National Tulip Day, 2013

National Tulip Day (Dutch: Nationale Tulpendag) is an annual event in January that preludes the tulip season in the Netherlands. The event has been held on the Dam Square in the centre of Amsterdam since 2012. In 2021 and 2022 it was cancelled because of the Covid pandemic. In 2023 the event took place at Museum Square (Museumplein). During this day a special garden of 200,000 tulips covers the square. In the morning people can view the tulips from a gangway, and in the afternoon they can pick tulips for free. The tulips are from North Holland.

== See also ==
- Flower bulb cultivation in the Netherlands
- Keukenhof

== Sources ==
- Nationale Tulpendag, De Telegraaf, 16 January 2014
- Gratis tulpen op De Dam, De Telegraaf, 18 January 2014
- Gratis tulpen op de Dam, NRC, 17 January 2014
