= Frederick Coyett =

Swedish noble, last colonial governor of Formosa

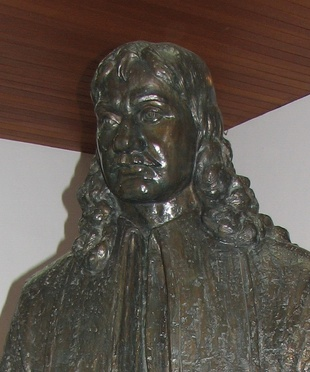
- Bust of Coyett in Tainan

12th Governor of Formosa
- In office 30 June 1656 – 1 February 1662
- Preceded by: Cornelis Caesar
- Succeeded by: none

14th Opperhoofd at Dejima
- In office 4 November 1652 – 10 November 1653

9th Opperhoofd at Dejima
- In office 3 November 1647 – 9 December 1648

Personal details
- Born: c. 1615 or 1620 Stockholm, Swedish Empire
- Died: 17 October 1687 (aged 67-72) Amsterdam, Dutch Republic
- Spouse(s): Susanna Boudaens (1645–1656); Helena de Sterke (1658–?); G.M. Gossens (1687-1687)
- Children: Balthasar Coyett

Frederick Coyett (Chinese: 揆一; pinyin: Kuíyī; Pe̍h-ōe-jī: Kûi-it), born in Stockholm c. 1615 or 1620, buried in Amsterdam on 17 October 1687, was a Swedish nobleman and the last colonial governor for the Dutch colony of Formosa. He was the first Swede to travel to Japan and China and became the last governor of Formosa (1656–1662).

== Name ==
In common with many people of the time, Coyett's name was spelled differently at different times and by different people. Frederick could also be Fredrik or Fredrick, and Coyett was also spelled Coyet, Coignet or Coijet.

== Early career ==
Coyett was born in Stockholm, Sweden, in a family with Dutch/Flemish roots that migrated from Brabant to Sweden in c. 1569. His father, a goldsmith, died in 1634 in Moscow. The prominent Swedish diplomat Peter Julius Coyet was his brother. From 1643 he worked for the Dutch East India Company. Coyett served twice as the VOC Opperhoofd in Japan, serving as the chief officer in Dejima first between 3 November 1647 and 9 December 1648 and then between 4 November 1652 and 10 November 1653.

== Deshima ==
Frederick Coyett was the brother-in-law of François Caron, both involved in releasing ten Dutch prisoners. Their discussion centered on the Nambu affair of 1643, when the skipper Hendrick Cornelisz Schaep and nine members of the crew of the Breskens were captured in Yamada in Iwate Prefecture.

The Breskens and her sister ship the Castricum (under Maarten Gerritsz Vries) had been sent by order of the Governor General in the Dutch East Indies, Anthonio van Diemen, to search for the Gold and Silver Islands that were said to lie somewhere northeast off the coast of Japan. They were also to investigate a route to northern Asia. In June 1643 the Breskens, which had been separated from the Castricum in a storm, entered the bay of Yamada in Nanbu domain in the northeast of Honshu. While searching for fresh water and food, ten crewmembers under Captain Schaep were apprehended and brought to the domain capital of Morioka. They were later sent to Edo. Unhappily for the Breskens' crew, a group of four Jesuits intent on infiltrating into Japan had been caught at around the same time in a different part of Japan. As a result, bakufu officials were extremely anxious about the problem of coastal defenses. However after it was understood that the crew were Dutch and not Catholics, bakufu fears were calmed and the problem to be solved became one of deciding by which procedure the Dutch should be released.

Coyett's superiors in Batavia considered his service as Opperhoofd satisfactory. He was able to maintain an optimal diplomatic stance vis-à-vis the bakufu in the face of several difficulties and provocations. His status was also enhanced when he and his brother Peter Julius were ennobled by Queen Christina of Sweden in 1649.

== Governor of Formosa ==
Coyett is mostly known as the last Dutch East India Company (Dutch: Vereenigde Oostindische Compagnie, VOC) governor of Taiwan.

On 10 February 1662 he was forced to surrender Fort Zeelandia after a nine-month siege from a large Chinese force of 25,000 men and 1,000 ships under Koxinga. Prior to losing Taiwan, Coyett said that Chinese were "little better than poor specimens of very effeminate men", believing that there was no plan to invade Taiwan. With his army decisively crushed by the Chinese under Koxinga, Coyett left Taiwan after the Siege of Fort Zeelandia with enough supply to reach Batavia. After three years imprisonment he was tried for high treason, due to his failure to hold Taiwan or preserve vital commercial interests. Coyett was pardoned and exiled to Rosengain, the most eastern of the Banda Islands, before he was released in 1674. In 1684 he bought a house on Keizersgracht, on a spot where the Hemony brothers used to have their foundry.

Coyett's son Balthasar Coyett, born to his first wife Susanna Boudaens in 1650, followed his father into service with the Dutch East India Company, eventually rising to become the Governor of Ambon.

== Inheritance in Batavia ==
Coyett was a member of the Council of the Indies. Before serving as Commander for trading in the VOC, in 1704, Coyett was the Secretary of the Landraad (court of the first instance). On 8 December 1658 Coyett remarried to Helena de Stereke, a widow of Pieter van Alphen's senior merchant. In 1736 he built a country house in a large field southeast of the walled city of Batavia. Coyett was known as a collector for Hindu and Buddhist art, and known to decorate his country house with these objects. One of his collection is the statue of Hindu god Kubera which is currently displayed in the National Museum of Indonesia.

Coyett remarried to G.M. Gossens (widow of Westpalm) a few days before his death, thus Gossens became the sole heir of Coyett's entire inheritance. In 1762, the country house was converted into a Chinese temple (klenteng). Some of Coyett's sculptures are still displayed in the building, currently the Vihara Buddhayana in Jakarta.

== Published works ==
In 1675 he published Neglected Formosa (Dutch: 't Verwaerloosde Formosa). In the book he accused the Dutch East India Company of ignorance and refusing to send backup, which caused him to lose Taiwan. The work was first published in Dutch and German. A Japanese translation was released in 1939, followed by a Chinese version in the 1950s. A complete English translation was not finished until 1975, though parts of Coyett's book were translated in William Campbell's Formosa Under the Dutch, published in 1903.

== See also ==
- VOC Opperhoofden in Japan

== Bibliography ==
- Coyett, Frederick (1675). 't verwaerloosde Formosa [Neglected Formosa] (in Dutch). by Jan Claesz. ten Hoorn ... en Michiel Pieters ...
  - Coyett, Frederick (1903) [First published 1675 in 't verwaerloosde Formosa]. "Part III: Chinese Conquest of Formosa". In Campbell, William (ed.). Formosa under the Dutch: described from contemporary records, with explanatory notes and a bibliography of the island. London: Kegan Paul. pp. 383–459. ISBN 978-957-638-083-9. LCCN 04007338.

Political offices
Preceded by Willem Verstegen	Opperhoofd at Dejima; 3 November 1647 – 9 December 1648	Succeeded by Dircq Snoecq
Preceded by Adriaen van der Burgh	Opperhoofd at Dejima; 4 November 1652 – 10 November 1653	Succeeded by Gabriel Happart
Preceded by Cornelis Caesar	Governor of Formosa; 1656–1662	Colony surrendered
