= Gabriel Towerson (East India Company) =

English naval officer and agent for the East India Company

Gabriel Towerson (1576 – 1623), was a captain and agent for the East India Company.

== Career ==
He may have been the son of William Towerson, an influential member of the Muscovy Company in 1576, and an adventurer in Fenton's voyage in 1582, who seems to be distinct from William Towerson, the merchant and navigator. His brother William is repeatedly mentioned in the East India papers. Gabriel appears to have gone out in the company's second voyage in 1604 under Sir Henry Middleton and to have been left as factor at Bantam, together with John Saris. In 1609 he and Saris returned to England; and in 1611 he went out again on the company's Eighth Voyage as captain of the Hector, under the command of Saris. On 15 January 1612 (OS)–13(N.S.), still in the Hector, he sailed from Bantam in company with Nicholas Downton and William Hawkins. He arrived at Waterford in September 1613 having brought back, "Coree", the first South African to set foot in England, who was taken into the care of Sir Thomas Smythe, Governor of the EIC. In the following January he applied for a 'gratification' for good service in bringing home the Hector. In considering the matter, the court found charges of private trading made against him, rendering him liable to the forfeiture of his bond for £1,000. They resolved to remit the punishment, but to make him pay freight for the goods, 18 January 1613–14. In 1617 he was again in India, apparently with some mission; Sir Thomas Roe, English ambassador at Ahmedabad to Jahangir, complained that Towerson had arrived with 'many servants, a trumpet, and more show' than he himself used.

In 1618 Towerson returned to England, leaving his wife at Agra. On 24 January 1619 – 1620 he was ordered to go out as principal factor in the Moluccas, with pay of £10 per month, the same as when he was captain of the Hector. He applied to go out in command of one of the company's ships; but this was refused, and, together with some other factors, he was ordered a passage 'in the great cabin of the Anne, of which Swanley is commander.' The sailing of the Anne appears to have been delayed; for she was still on the way out on 30 May 1621, when a consultation of the principal officers of the fleet was held on board her. The committee of officers appointed Towerson to command the Lesser James, on account of the differences between her pilot and master ever since they left England. In November he was at Batavia, whence he and the other factors wrote on the 6th that, "seeing the Netherlanders are so contentious, false, and impudent in all their proceedings, not shaming to affirm or write anything that makes for their purposes, we have thought fit not to answer their protest fraught with untruths." Such a declaration seems to have a very direct bearing on the tragedy which followed. In May he went to Amboyna, to succeed the agent who was going home.

== Amboyna massacre ==
On 11 February 1623 on the island of Amboyna, a Japanese soldier Shichizo in the Dutch service was apprehended on suspicion of treachery. He was forced by torture to confess that he had been bribed by the English to take part in a plot to seize the fort. On the 15th, Abel Price, a drunken English surgeon, was arrested, tortured, and made to admit the conspiracy. Then Towerson was arrested and all the other Englishmen on the island. Many of them—including Towerson—were subjected to severe torture "first with water and then with burning wax candles under their armpits, hams, and soles of their feet extremely." They were thereby compelled to admit the existence of the plot and their own and Towerson's complicity in it. On 27 February 1623, the Dutch governor of Amboyna, Herman van Speult, ordered the beheading of Towerson, along with nine other Englishmen, ten Japanese and a Portuguese. All died declaring their innocence; and considering that there were only twenty Englishmen all told on the island, and they unarmed civilians, while there were from four to five hundred Dutch, and half of them soldiers in garrison, besides eight large ships in the roadstead, their truth may be considered established. "It is true," says the official narration, "that stories do record sundry valiant and hardy enterprises of the English nation, and Holland is witness of some of them; yet no story nor legend reporteth any such hardiness either of the English or others that so few persons, so naked of all provisions and supplies, should undertake such an adventure upon such a counter party so well and abundantly fitted at all points." On the other hand, it must be remembered that torture was then and for many years later, in England as on the continent, considered a good and useful means of compelling an unwilling witness to give evidence, and the evidence was considered none the worse for being so obtained. The idea in England was that the Dutch were aiming at a monopoly of the trade, and prepared to stick at no measures which might secure it for them. It is perhaps more probable that on this occasion they were the victims of a blind panic, which rendered them incapable of reason or reflection. News of the massacre reached England in June 1624 aboard the Texel. The incident became known as the 'Amboyna massacre' and remained a source of tension between the English and Dutch until late in the 17th century.

== Personal life ==
Towerson married the widow of Sir William Hawkins, Mariam Khan, an Armenian Christian who was the daughter of an influential merchant in the courts of the Mughal Emperors Akbar and Jahangir. Towerson abandoned her and returned to England in 1619 before resettling in Amboyna. Despite appealing to the EIC for maintenance, she received nothing and on Towerson's death his assets were awarded to his brother.

== Legacy ==
In 1654, Towerson's heirs and others received £3,615 from the Dutch East India Company in compensation for the events at Amboyna. Towerson features in John Dryden's 1673 play Amboyna, or the Cruelties of the Dutch to the English Merchants.
