= Balthasar Coyett =

Balthasar Coyett (c.1650 Fort Zeelandia (Taiwan) – 19 September 1725, Batavia, Dutch East Indies) was a Dutch-Swedish official in the Dutch East India Company, serving from 1701 to 1706 as the Governor of Ambon. He was the son of Frederick Coyett, the last Governor of Formosa, and Susanna Boudaens (The Hague 1622- Formosa 1656). Balthasar's son Frederik Julius Coyett (1680-1736) was also a colonial official.
