= Paulus van Caerden =

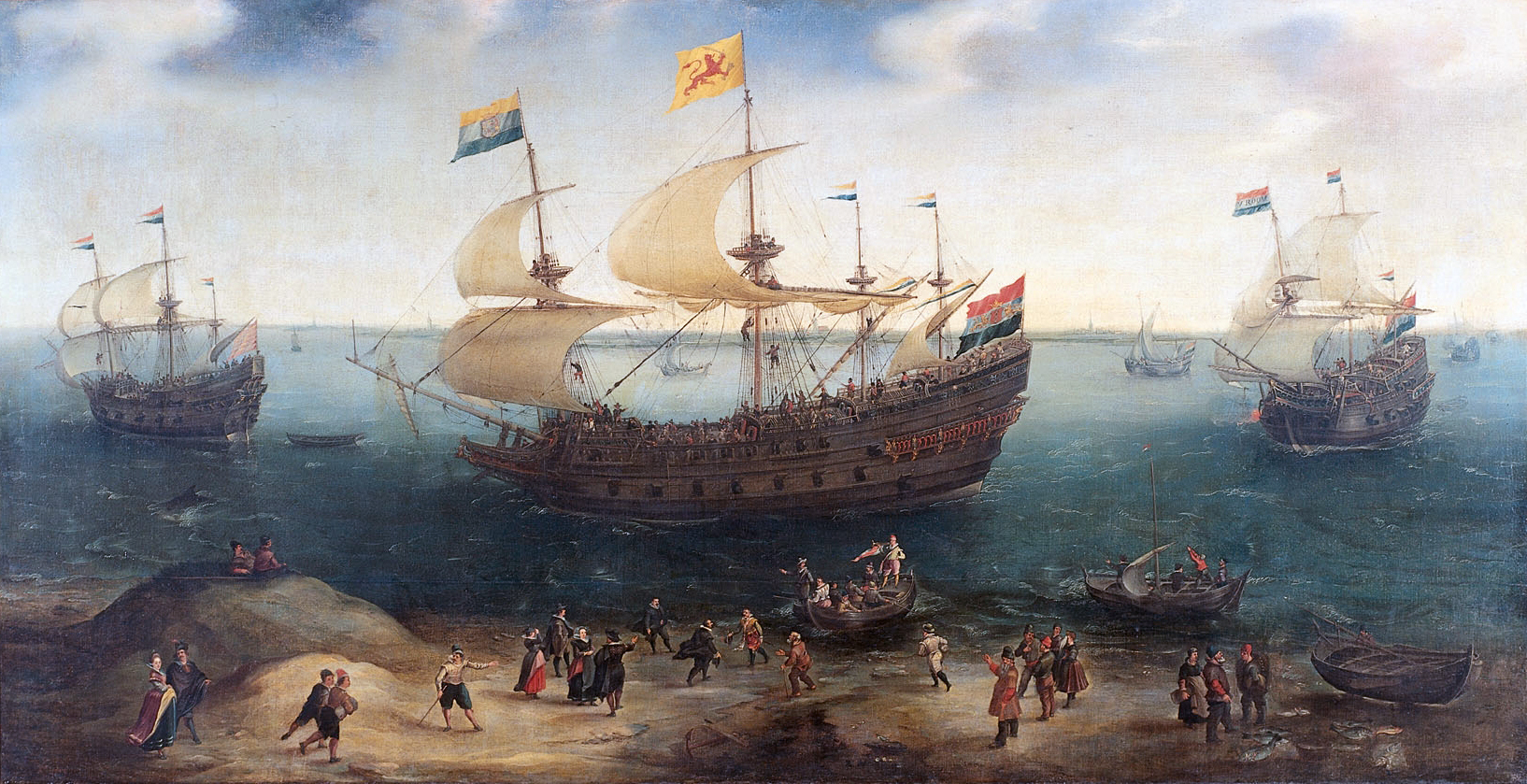
The Amsterdam four-masted ship 'De Hollandse Tuyn' and other ships under the command of Paulus van Caerden return from Brazil, by Hendrick Cornelisz Vroom

Paulus van Caerden (c. 1569 – Manila, October 1615 or 1616) was a Dutch admiral in service of the Dutch East India Company. He was governor of the Maluku Islands for one month.

In 1595 Van Caerden served as midshipman on the first expedition to the East Indies under command of Cornelis de Houtman. When the expedition returned to Amsterdam, only 89 to 94 of the original 248 crewmembers were still alive. Eight more crewmembers died once ashore. The expedition had not been a commercial success. The Compagnie van Verre could hardly cover the costs, but the goal of the expedition was reached; it was proven that it was possible to reach Asia by way of the Cape of Good Hope without being hindered by the Portuguese.

On 21 December 1599, Pieter Both, with Van Caerden as vice-admiral, led an expedition commissioned by the Brabantsche Compagnie, founded by Isaac le Maire, to the East Indies. In 1600 the four ships arrived in the Indonesian Archipelago. Pieter Both sailed to Bantam, while Van Caerden unsuccessfully attempted to establish trading relations with Aceh, in the northern parts of Sumatra.

On 8 July 1601 Van Caerden discovered the Mossel Bay in South Africa. The mussels found there were a welcome addition to the crew's diet. The Verendigde Landen and Hof van Holland returned to Holland in November 1601. From 1603 to 1605 Van Caerden made a journey to Brazil with six ships.

== 1606–1608 ==
On 20 April 1606 admiral Van Caerden left on an expedition from Texel. Once around the Cape of Good Hope, he attacked the Portuguese located at the fort San Sebastian in Mozambique with seven, eight or eleven ships. On 29 March 1607 he laid anchor in the port of Mocambique with a number of armed ships and a force of 1060 or 1500 men. His assault was beaten off, however, and after suffering 25 casualties and 70 to 80 wounded, Van Caerden proposed a truce. On 7 May 1607 Van Caerden sent a letter to Dom Estêvão in which he threatened to pillage the entire area, unless he was bought off with a large sum of money. Dom Estêvão rejected the proposal, upon which the Dutch carried out their threat, setting the city on fire and cutting down all the trees before lifting the siege, which had lasted for two months. Van Caerden, who spotted three Portuguese Carracks close to the fort on 4 August, declined to take action and left on 26 August. Afterwards Van Caerden visited Goa, Calicut and the Coromandel Coast.

Two of the six ships in Van Caerden's fleet, the China and the Walcheren, were lost as a result of a seaquake caused by an eruption of the volcano Tafasoho. On 18 July Van Caerden appointed captain Apollonius Scotte as commander of the fort at Tafasoho. Van Caerden then travelled to Moro, in the northern part of Halmahera in a small boat, and conquered an island called Siauw, which was most likely Morotai and was defended by ten Spanish soldiers. When admiral Paulus van Caerden returned from this unimportant undertaking, his ship was caught by two Spanish ships in the Bay of Leleda. Van Caerden surrendered to the enemy ships and was taken prisoner and taken to the fort at Gamalama, Ternate.

The Spanish commander initially demanded the release of all Spanish captives, the handover of Fort Malajoe, 6,000 golden ducats and the promise that Van Caerden would never return. In the end Van Caerden and ten other Dutch crewman were freed against a payment of 6,000 ducats, which Van Caerden personally provided. After Van Caerden was released by the Spaniards, he took back command of the fleet, but because of his own carelessness he was captured again at the start of July on his ship the Goede Hope. On 9 July the Spanish sent Van Caerden to Manila, where he was forced to work as a lifter for the construction of a fort.

One of the goals of the visit of Joris van Spilbergen to Manila, possibly at the direction of the States-General, was the release of admiral Paulus van Caerden. But van Spilbergen came too late, as Van Caerden had died in the meantime.
