= Adriaen Maertensz Block =

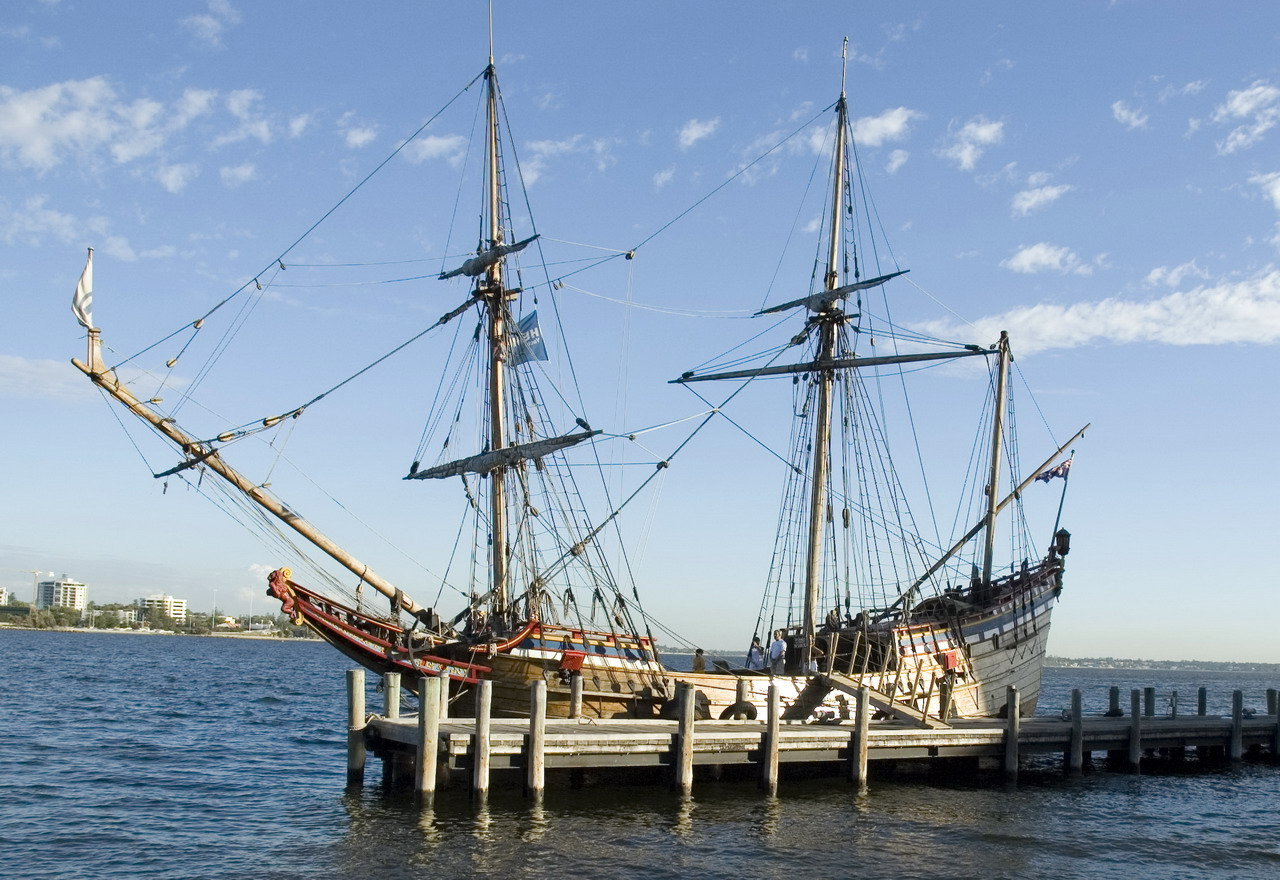
Replica of Block's flagship, the Duyfken

Adriaen Maertensz Block (c. 1582, Gouda – 7 March 1661, Lisse) was successively captain, commander, and governor of Ambon between 1614 and 1617, administrator of the Council of the Indies for the Kamer of the Dutch East India Company in Amsterdam (VOC) in Batavia.

In 1627 two of his ships wrecked on the island of Wight in a storm. He probably intended to go there to buy secretly and trade privately. He was suspended and declared unsuitable for other similar offices and retired in a country house at Lisse (which he had let build in 1641), now known as Kasteel Keukenhof.

In his inventory were many books listed on navigation and history: Jan Huygen van Linschoten, Hugo de Groot, Justus Lipsius, Lieuwe van Aitzema, Plutarch, Tacitus.
