= Isaac Commelin =

Dutch historian (1598–1676)

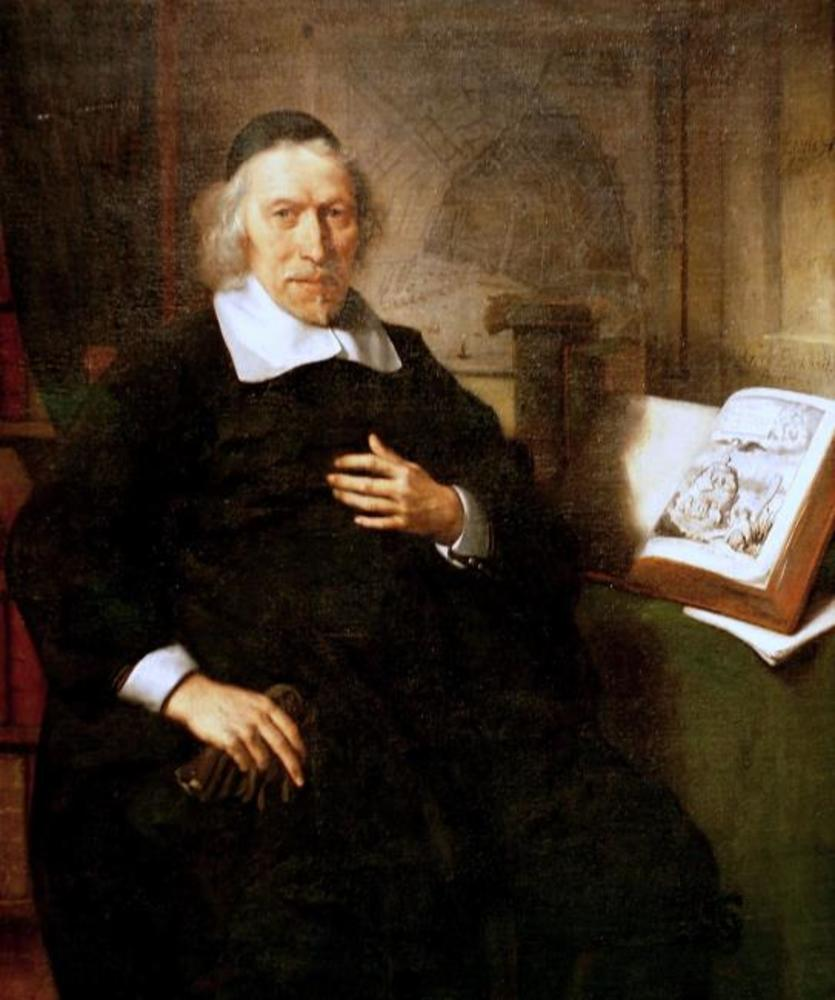
Gerbrand van den Eeckhout: Portrait of Isaac Commelin in 1669, Städel Museum.

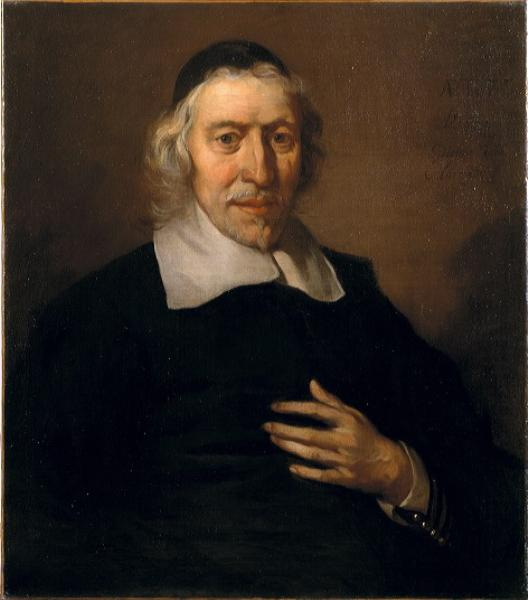
Isaac Commelin in 1675, by Pieter van Anraedt.

Isaac Commelin (19 October 1598, in Amsterdam – 13 January 1676, in Amsterdam) was a Dutch historian, a member of the vroedschap and a manager of a charity hospital, providing help to the sick and poor.

== Life ==
Isaac Commelijn was the son of a bookseller Jan Commelin and Catherina Valckenier. His father came from Brussels and had settled in Amsterdam around 1582. Through his mother he was closely related to the powerful Valckeniers family. Isaac married into the rich Bouwer family and became the brother-in-law of nl:Syvert P. Sem, a former investor of the East India Company, involved in charity. The couple had five children, two sons Jan and Caspar. He lived at Gelderse kade en Oudezijds Achterburgwal, near Oude Kerk. His wife died in 1641.

Commelin wrote Lives of the Stadtholders William I and Maurice and Origin and Progress of the Dutch East India Company, as well as other basic works in the fields of geography, cosmography, astronomy, discovery, plague (disease) and travel.

From 1647-1655 he served as regent of the NZ Huiszitten House (charity (practice) for the poor). From 1655-1675 he served as regent of a hospital for victims of the plague (Pesthuis). It was his brother Caspar who served together with the painter Ferdinand Bol as regent of OZ Huiszitten House.

In 1665 he cooperated with Tobias van Domselaer and Arnoldus Montanus on a book about the history of Amsterdam. He was the father of the botanist Jan Commelin and the grandfather of Caspar Commelin.

== Works ==
- Hollandsch Placcaatboek. Amsterdam, 1644
- Begin ende voortgangh van de Vereenighde Nederlantsche Geoctroyeerde Oost-Indische Compagnie : Vervatende de voornaemste reysen, by de inwoonderen der selver provincien derwaerts gedaen..., Amsterdam: Johannes Janssonius, 1646 via archive.org
- Wilhelm En Maurits van Nassau, Princen van Orangien, Haer Leven en Bedrijf, Of 't Begin en Voortgang der Nederlandsche Oorlogen : Vervatende een Vaerachtigh Verhael Aller Belegheringen ende Victorien, Daer de Ho. Mog. Heeren Staten der Vereenighde Nederlanden, onder hun wijse Regeeringe te Water en te Lande, door Godes zegen mede verrijckt zijn; Met verscheyde Koopere Figueren verciert; En door een Lief-hebber der Historien uyt verscheyde Schriften te samen ghestelt, Amsterdam, 1651
- Beschrijvinge van Amsterdam, haar eerste oorspronk uyt den huyze der Heeren van Aemstel en Aemstellant; met en verhaal van haar leven en dappere krijgsdaden. Uyt verscheyde oude en nieuwe Hollandtsche kronijcken, beschrijvingen, brieven, willekeuren, etc. by een vergadert, Amsterdam, M. Wz. Doornick, 1665.
