= Steven van der Hagen =

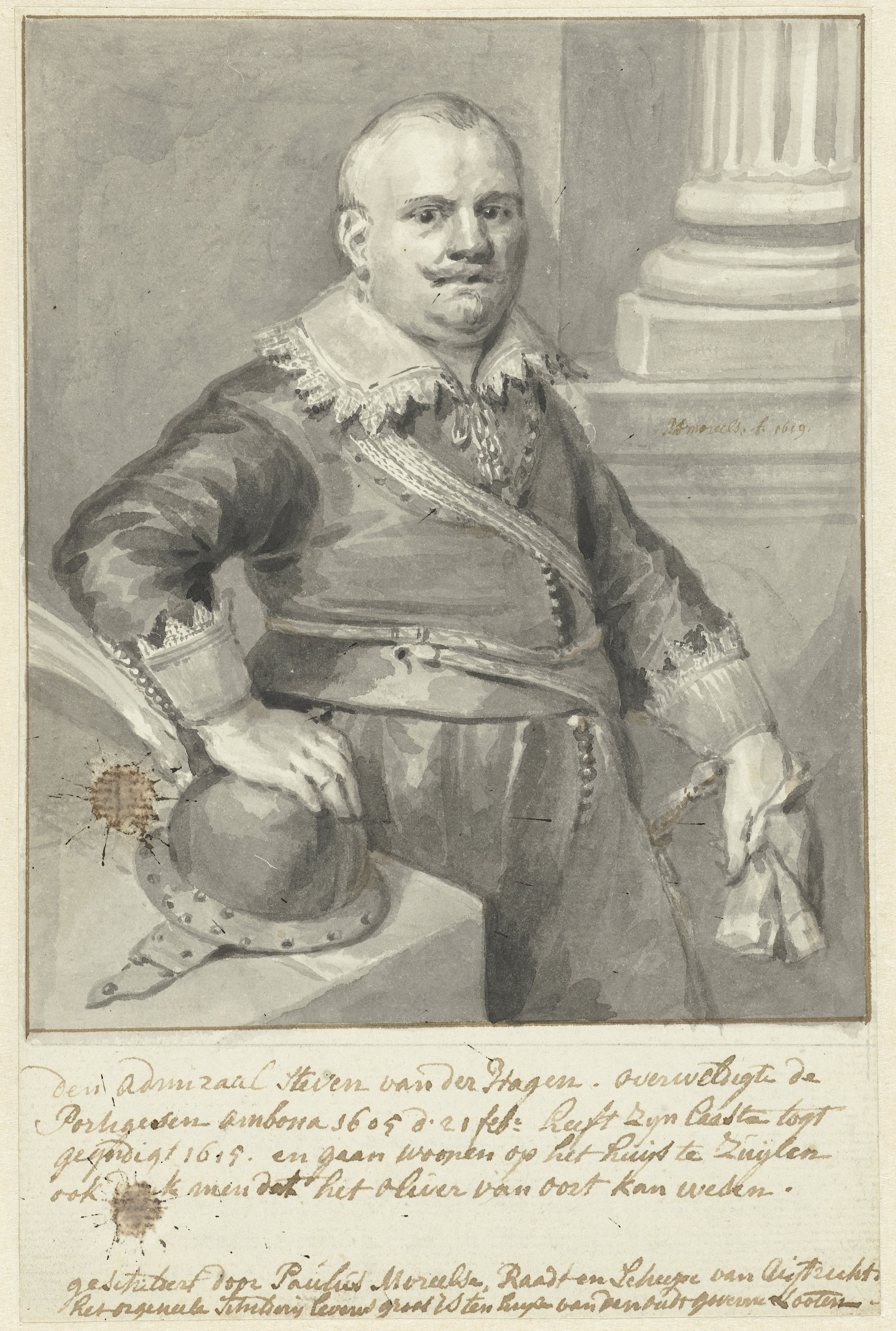
Steven van der Hagen

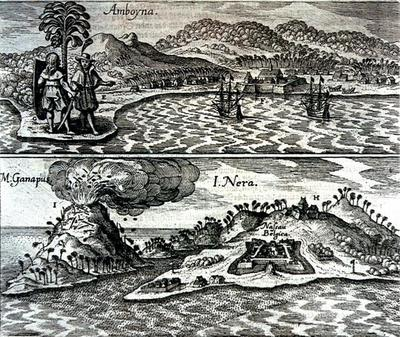
Dutch fortifications and English tradeposts on the bare and volcanic Ambon and Banda-Neira (1655) with the still-active volcano Gunung Api (658 m or 2,159 ft) to the left

Steven van der Hagen (1563–1624) was the first admiral of the Dutch East India Company (VOC). He made three visits to the East Indies, spending six years in all there. He was appointed to the Council of the Indies. Van der Hagen protested against the harsh administration of the administrators, who wanted a monopoly on the clove trade and were willing to fight against their Spanish, Portuguese, English or Asiatic trade competitors in order to get it. Laurens Reael and Steven van der Hagen wrote with disapproval on how the Heren XVII treated the interests and laws of the Maluku population.

Both argued that the company had no right to compel the natives of the Moluccas to sell their spices exclusively to the Dutch, unless the latter could supply them in return with adequate supplies of food and clothing at reasonable prices. They urged that it was better, in the long run, for the Dutch to content themselves with large sales and small profits rather than strive for a rigid and oppressive monopoly which aimed at small sales and big profits. Moreover, Laurens Reael and Van der Hagen, while prepared in the last extremity to use force against their English competitors in the Moluccas were reluctant to do so otherwise, for fear of unfavourable repercussions on Anglo-Dutch relations in Europe - a possibility that did not worry Coen. Finally they both considered that it might be unjust and unwise to exclude Asian traders, whether Chinese, Malay or Javanese, from the Moluccas by force.

== Life ==
Steven van der Hagen was born around 1563 in Amersfoort and was brought up by an aunt, his father's sister, after his parents fled to the Southern Netherlands due to the Dutch Revolt. Steven was given a good education which included Latin. When he was ten he went to visit his father Andries van der Hagen in Bruges, and together they went to Ypres and Doornik to seek work for him. Steven began work at a silkworkers' shop on the market square, before returning to Ypres to receive further education from his uncle Willem van der Hagen.

=== Andalusia ===
At 12, Steven developed a great interest in Spain and (unbeknownst to his uncle) he traveled to Calais on foot to catch a ship there. A ship's captain heard that Steven was not a Fleming and asked him if he had run away from home. Once they got into conversation, Steven found out that five Antwerp merchants were traveling to Spain on this ship. Steven made a good impression on one of the merchants, who thought him wellbred, and offered (under conditions) to take him to Seville with him. For reasons of security, Steven did not use his surname so that nobody would connect him to his well-known uncle.

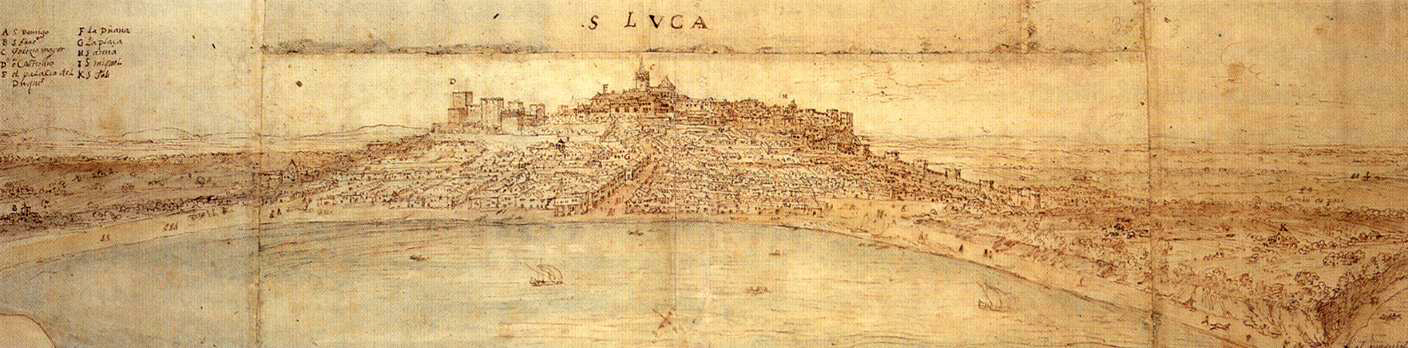
Panorama of Sanlucar by Antonie van Wijngaarden in 1567

A few days later Steven was discovered by his cousin, who told him to go home, but Steven refused to give up his voyage because he had been beaten by his uncle. The ship left within a few days on the easterly wind. Steven was taken on by a shopkeeper in linen in Sanlúcar de Barrameda, who had a troublesome and difficult wife. Steven stayed for two years, until he spoke Spanish well. On a walk through Seville, he met one of the merchants who had brought him to Spain. Steven refused to re-enter his service and instead moved to Jerez de la Frontera. On the way he stayed with a shepherd, who offered him goats' milk and cheese. In Jerez, Steven met Don Garcia d'Avila, who gave him accommodation in his palace. Steven watched bullfights in the market square and horse-mounted fights in the streets.

In 1578 Spain went to war with Barbary – a number of Dutch boats fought for Spain, but their crews returned dangerously ill and when they were being given the sacrament as part of their last rites, so that they could be buried in holy ground, Steven acted as interpreter.

Steven met a ship's captain from Medemblik, many of whose crew had died of diarrhea, and joined the crew for the return journey to Holland. The ship took on a cargo of salt and set off in convoy. When Steven got back to the Netherlands, he returned to Amersfoort and heard that his mother had died and his father had remarried.

With the money he inherited he travelled to Italy. In 1587 his ship was lost in Cádiz in the raid by Francis Drake. He succeeded to get back to Hoorn and in 1589, he married Stephania van der Made in Amsterdam in a civil ceremony before the schepenen. Their church marriage took place a few months later in Utrecht.

=== At sea ===
- Merchant and pioneer of the so-called "Straatvaart" to Spain by Northern Netherlandish ship owners (1585–1593). He is also known as a ship's captain, who as early as 1587 (on behalf of his clients from Hoorn) led a convoy of 120 last, 240 ton ships through the "straat" (straits). This made it possible not only to transport heavier wheat cargoes, but also longer goods, like ships' masts.
- Merchant on two ships to the Gulf of Guinea (July 1597 - March 1598).
- Admiral of three ships of the Compagnie van Verre (1599–1601). In 1599 Van der Hagen landed on Madagascar - had he or other Dutchmen conquered it at this time, South Africa's history could have been very different. In 1600 the three fleets lying at anchor in Bantam decided to bargain and load pepper together. Steven van der Hagen sailed back to Ambon with 27 soldiers. The inlanders rather dealt with him than the Portuguese. Van der Hagen was allowed to build a fortification. In 1603 Frederik de Houtman returned from Ambon Island on a ship captained by Steven van der Hagen, surrendering the fort there to the Portuguese.

=== In the service of VOC ===
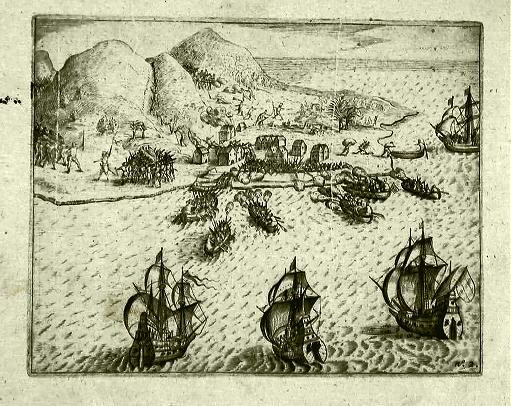
"The Dutch attack on the Portuguese at Ambon Island". Isaac Commelin, 1645.

At the end of 1603 Van der Hagen was chosen as the admiral of the VOC's first fleet. For two months his ships - despatched from Amsterdam, Hoorn and Enkhuizen - lay off the coast of England awaiting a favourable wind. Van der Hagen was sent to sea, with secret instructions only to be opened after leaving port. On reading the instructions he became angry, since the "Heren XVII" (the directors) ordered him to fight the Spanish and Portuguese. Other sources suggest it was the crew that became angry because they had not taken service to fight.

After six months at sea, on 30 May 1604 they sighted Cape of Good Hope. Then they hijacked a Portuguese ship laden with ivory. On 21 September the ships arrived in Goa and one month later in Calicut, the city of the Zamorin. On 11 November Van der Hagen reached a political agreement to trade at Kozhikode and Ponnani and promised the Zamorin help against the Portuguese. On the Indian coast were founded the Masulipatnam (1605) and Petapuli (1606) factory, aimed especially at getting a hold on the huge trade in cotton, spices, precious stones, and pigments. After a few weeks he reached Pegu and sold its sovereign an emerald. The Dutch were fascinated by his wealth, but also by the crocodiles and white elephants in the kingdom. In December his ships arrived in Bantam, but sailed on to Ambon. With the help of local population Van der Hagen captured the Portuguese fort on Ambon (25 February 1605) without any shot, the first territorial possession of the VOC in Asia.

At the end of the year, one of the fastest sailing ships in Van der Hagen's fleet, the Duyfken, a yacht under the captain Willem Jansz, sailed to the south and discovered the north coast of Australia, which he thought to be connected to New Guinea. In the Gulf of Carpentaria, named after Pieter de Carpentier they went ashore. In 1607 Van der Hagen sailed to Mauritius, there he met with Cornelis Matelieff and ate a dodo, whose taste he noted was rather disgusting.

Back home he bought a house in Utrecht on the Oude Gracht. He spoke with the naturalist Carolus Clusius about the plants and animals he saw during his voyage; Clusius took notes in Latin which were published after his death in Caroli Clvsii Atrebatis Cvrae Posteriores, Sev Plurimarum non antè cognitarum, aut descriptarum stirpium, peregrinorum´que aliquot animalium Novæ Descriptiones: Quibus & omnia ipsius Opera, aliáque ab eo versa augentur, aut illustrantur von Clusius, Carolus, Leyden 1611. In 1614 he sailed to Malabar and Goa to fight the Moorish pirates there. He then left for the Red Sea for negotiations, and in 1615 sailed to the Straits of Malacca. In 1616 admiral Van der Hagen defeated the Portuguese at the Malay Peninsula.

Because of his dissatisfaction with the governance of Adriaen Maertensz. Block, Van der Hagen convened an assembly there. Block was replaced and Van der Hagen (perhaps temporarily) took over command of Ambon (June 1617). In 1618 he and his ship set off for Pulau Naira (or Banda-Neira), one of the Spice Islands. At the end of the year he was appointed to the Council of the Indies (November 1614 - October 1619). Van der Hagen became the first councillor under the governor-generals Gerard Reynst, Laurens Reael and Jan Pieterszoon Coen.

Van der Hagen was painted in 1619, possibly by Paulus Moreelse. In 1620 Van der Hagen lived either in Slot Zuylen on the River Vecht or on Bleyesteyn. He was buried on 25 July 1624 in Utrecht, having died of the plague. His direct descendants still live in the Netherlands, Belgium, Germany and Australia. Streets in The Netherlands are named after Steven van der Hagen in a.o. Rotterdam, Amersfoort and Den Helder.

== See also ==
- Pieter Both
