= Teylingen =

- Municipality
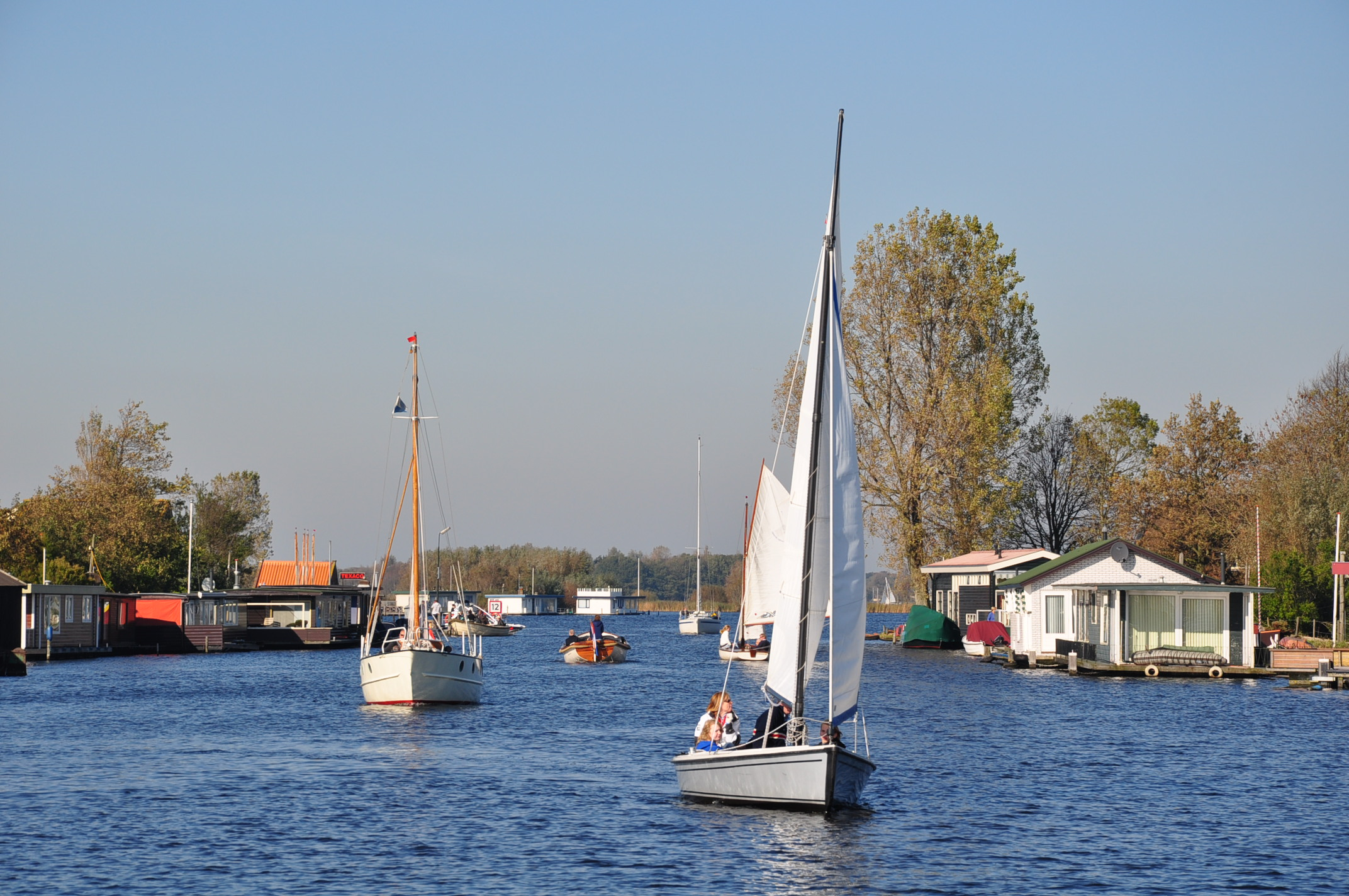
- The Kagerplassen lake system in Teylingen

- Flag Coat of arms

- Location in South Holland
- Coordinates: 52°13′N 4°29′E
- Country: Netherlands
- Province: South Holland
- Established: 1 January 2006

Government
  - Body: Municipal council
  - Mayor: Frank Rijkaart (acting) (BBB)

Area
  - Total: 33.49 km^{2} (12.93 sq mi)
  - Land: 28.38 km^{2} (10.96 sq mi)
  - Water: 5.11 km^{2} (1.97 sq mi)
- Elevation: 0 m (0 ft)

Population (January 2021)
  - Total: 37,791
  - Density: 1,332/km^{2} (3,450/sq mi)
- Time zone: UTC+1 (CET)
  - Summer (DST): UTC+2 (CEST)
- Postcode: 2170–2172, 2215, 2360–2362
- Area code: 0252, 071
- Website: www.teylingen.nl

Teylingen (Dutch pronunciation: [ˈtɛilɪŋə(n)]) is a municipality in the Western Netherlands, in the province of South Holland. It was created on 1 January 2006, through the amalgamation of Sassenheim, Voorhout and Warmond. It is named after Teylingen Castle, located in Voorhout. In 2019, it had a population of 37,061.

The municipality is bordered by Noordwijkerhout and Lisse to the north, Haarlemmermeer and Alkemade to the east, Leiderdorp and Leiden to the south, Oegstgeest and Katwijk to the west. It is located in an area called the "Dune and Bulb Region" (Duin- en Bollenstreek). The Kagerplassen are to the east of Sassenheim.

== Population centres ==
- Sassenheim - location of city hall
- Teijlingen, with the castle
- Voorhout
- Warmond

== Topography ==
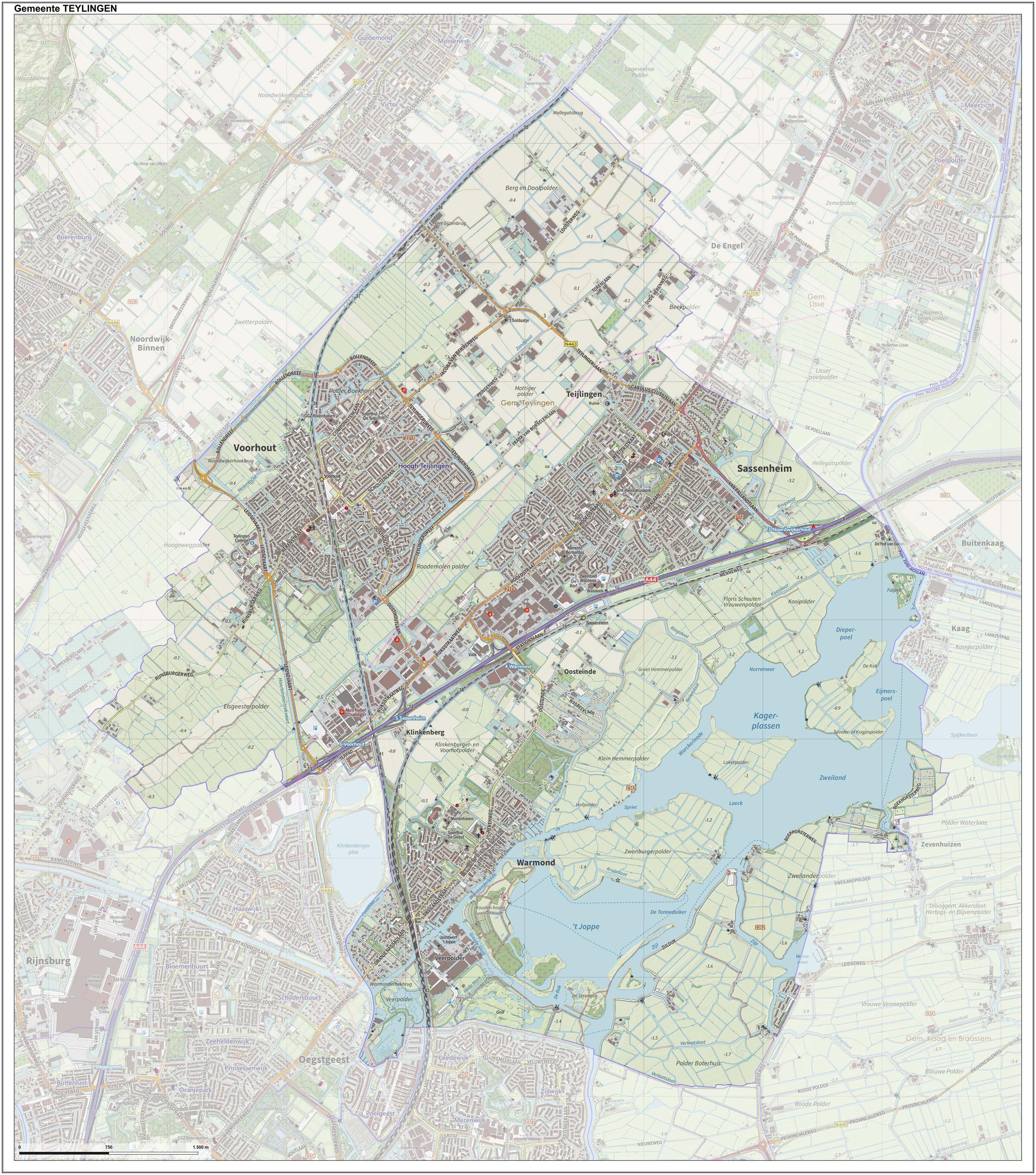
Map of Teylingen, June 2015

== Public transportation ==
Railway **Leiden Centraal to Haarlem** (part of line 10), with stations (municipalities in bold) and official station abbreviations:
- **Leiden** Centraal (ledn)
- Voorhout (vh) (mun. **Teylingen**)
- **Hillegom** (hil)
- **Heemstede**-Aerdenhout (mun. **Bloemendaal**) (had)
- **Haarlem** (hlm)

== Notable people ==
- Herman Boerhaave (1668 in Voorhout – 1738) a botanist, chemist, Christian humanist and physician
- Han Zuilhof (born 1965 in Sassenheim) the Chair of Organic Chemistry at Wageningen University
- Frank Ammerlaan (born 1979 in Sassenheim) a Dutch artist who lives and works in London

=== Sport ===
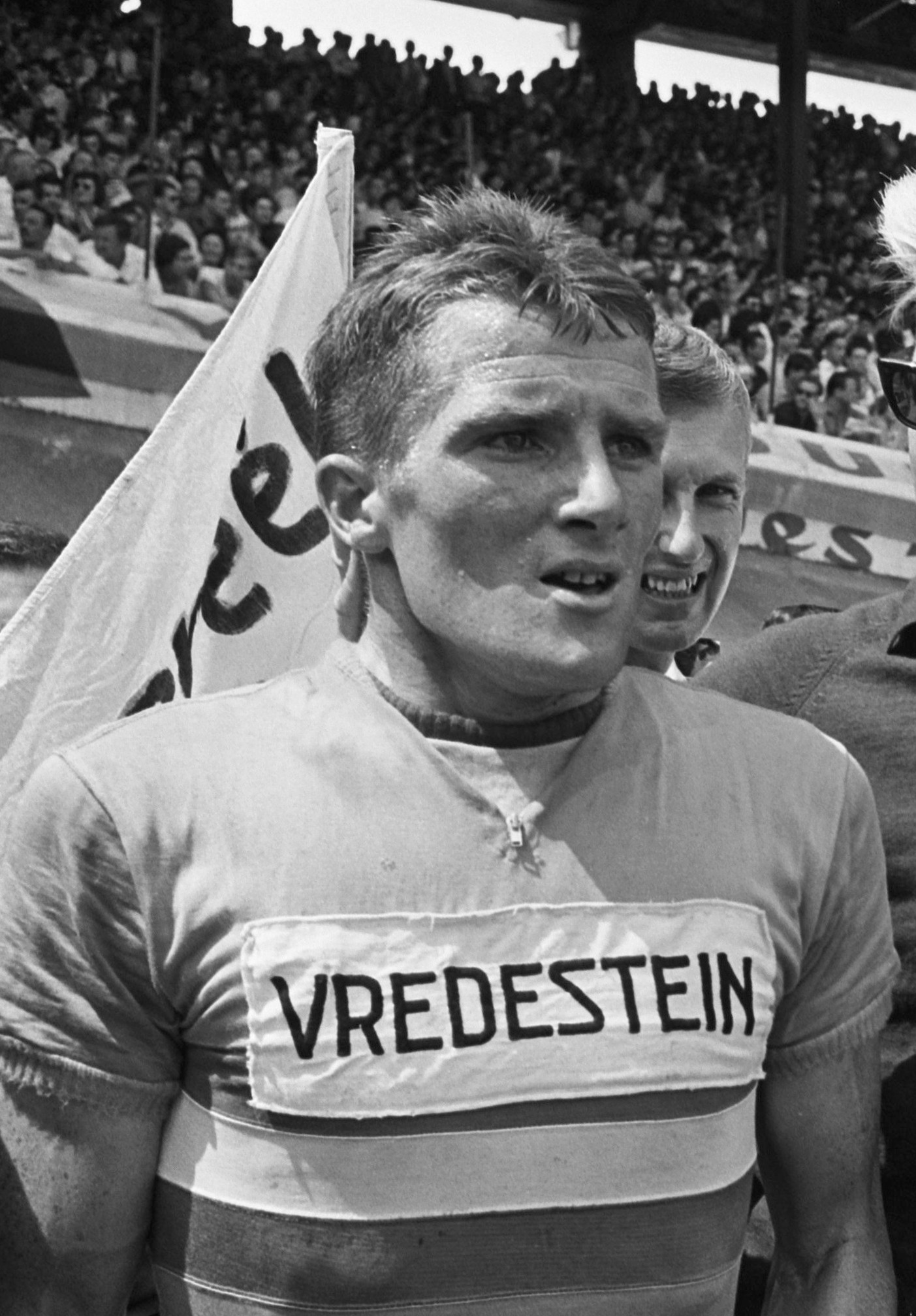
Bart Zoet, 1964

- Piet van der Lans (born 1940 in Sassenheim – 2018) a Dutch track cyclist, competed at the 1960 Summer Olympics
- Bart Zoet (1942 in Sassenheim – 1992) a Dutch cyclist, team gold medallist at the 1964 Summer Olympics
- Stan van Belkum (born 1961 in Warmond) a former water polo player, competed at the 1980 and 1984 Summer Olympics
- Rob van Dijk (born 1969 in Voorhout) a retired football goalkeeper with 364 club caps
- Edwin van der Sar (born 1970 in Voorhout) a retired football goalkeeper with 606 club caps
- Martin Hersman (born 1974 in Sassenheim) a retired speed skater, he competed at the 1994 and 1998 Winter Olympics

== Image gallery ==
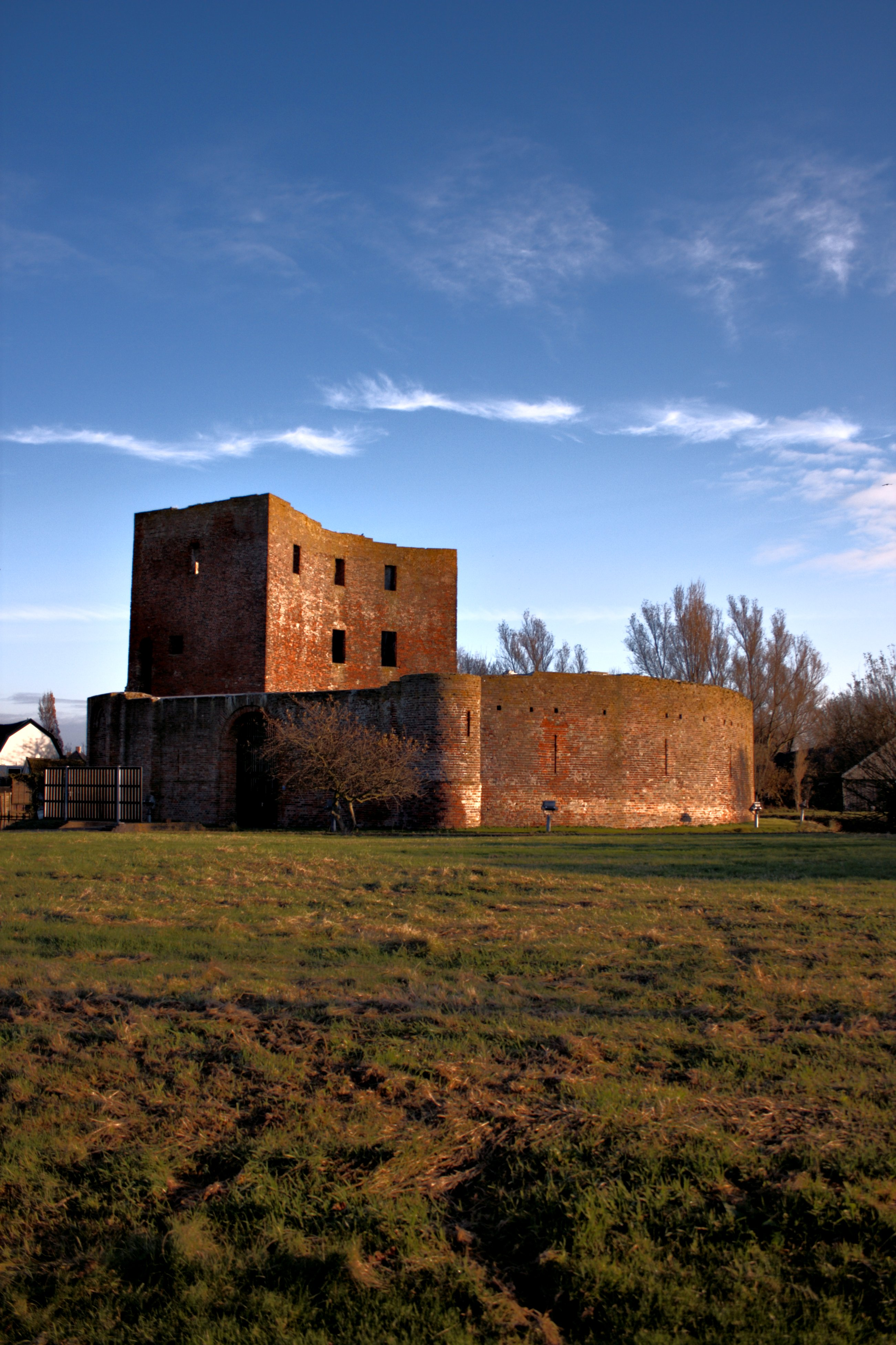
The ruins of Teylingen

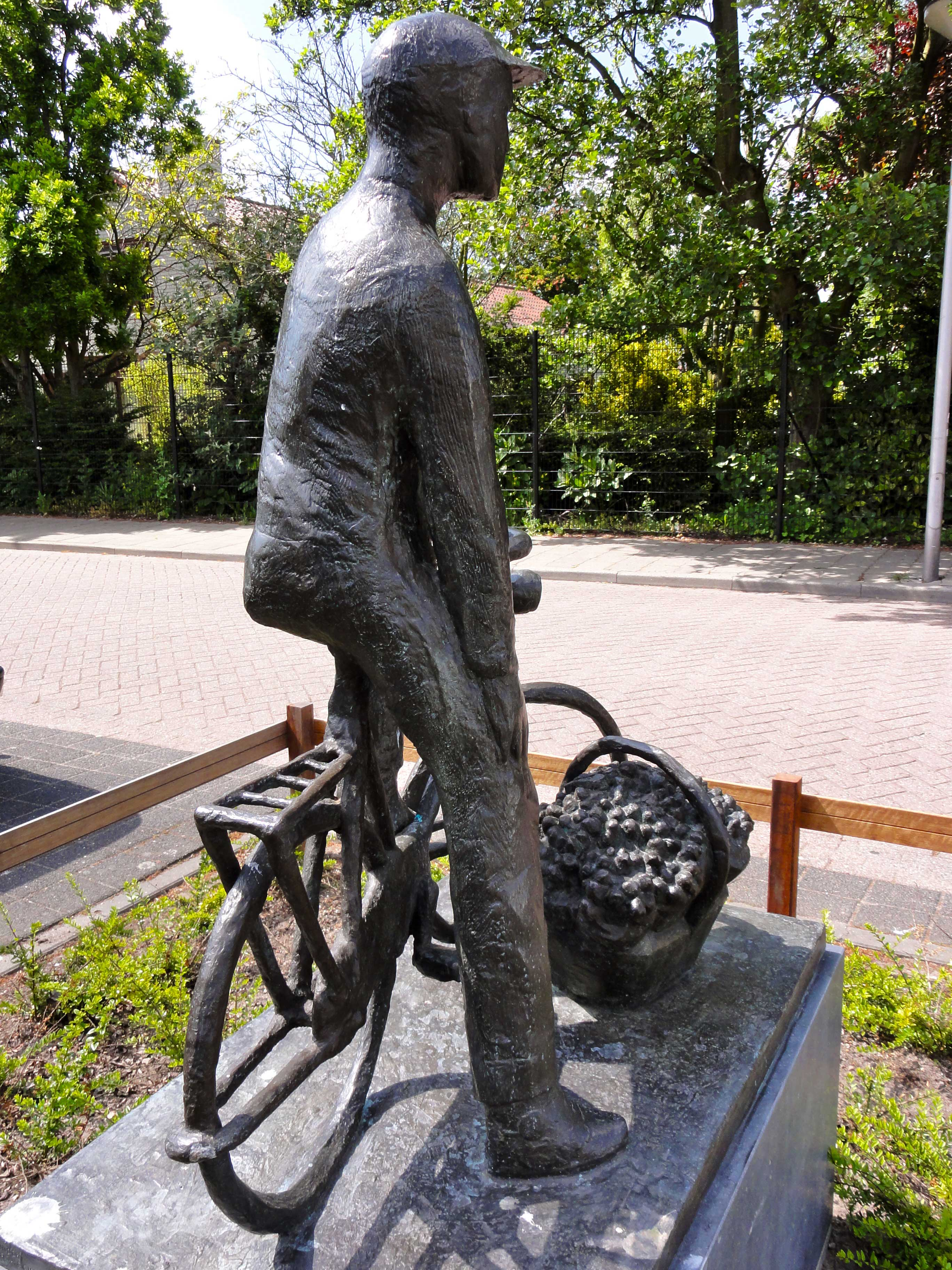
Beeld Lucas de Wit2 1994 Raadhuisplein Voorhout

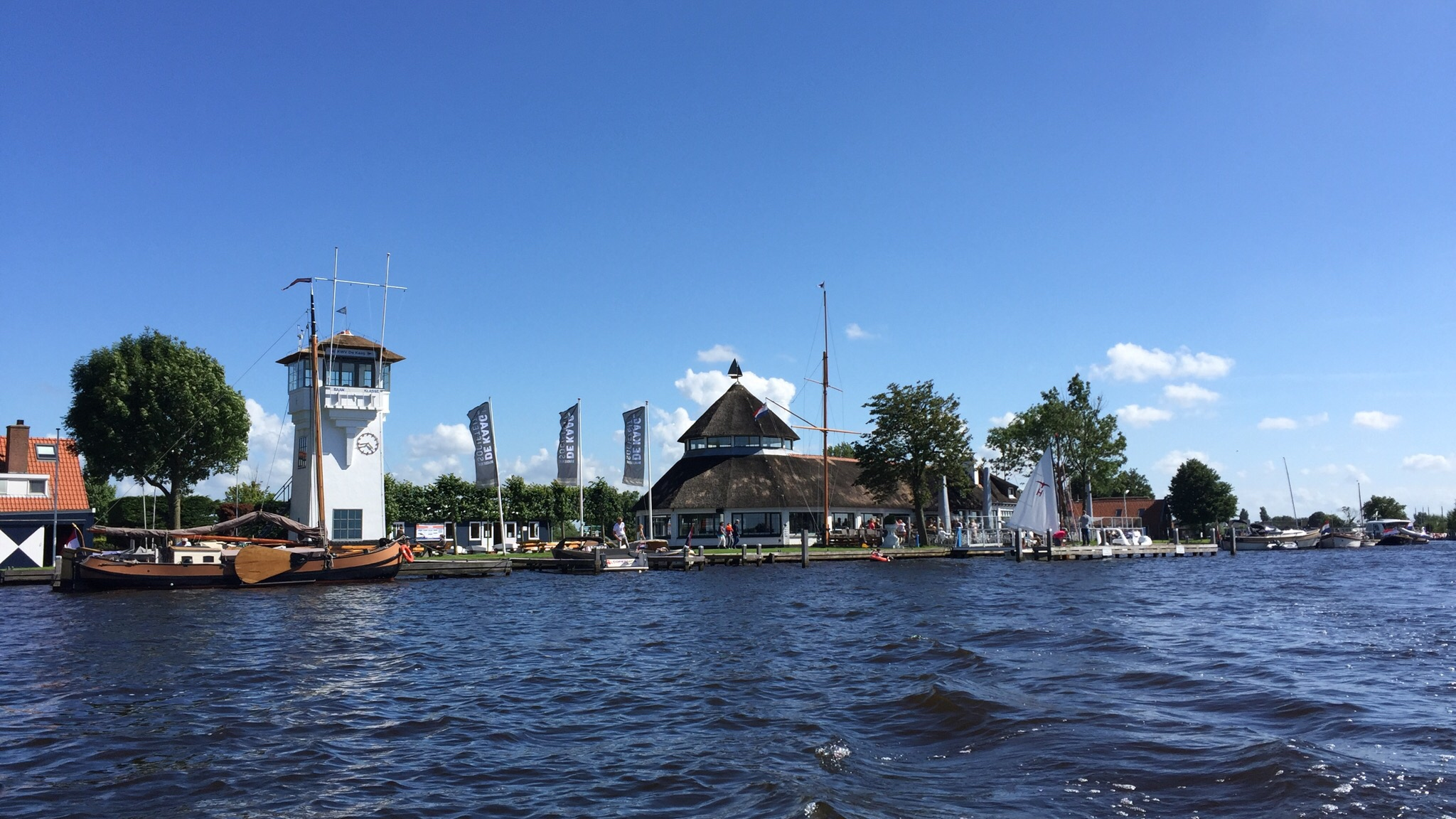
Kaag Sociëteit Kager plassen

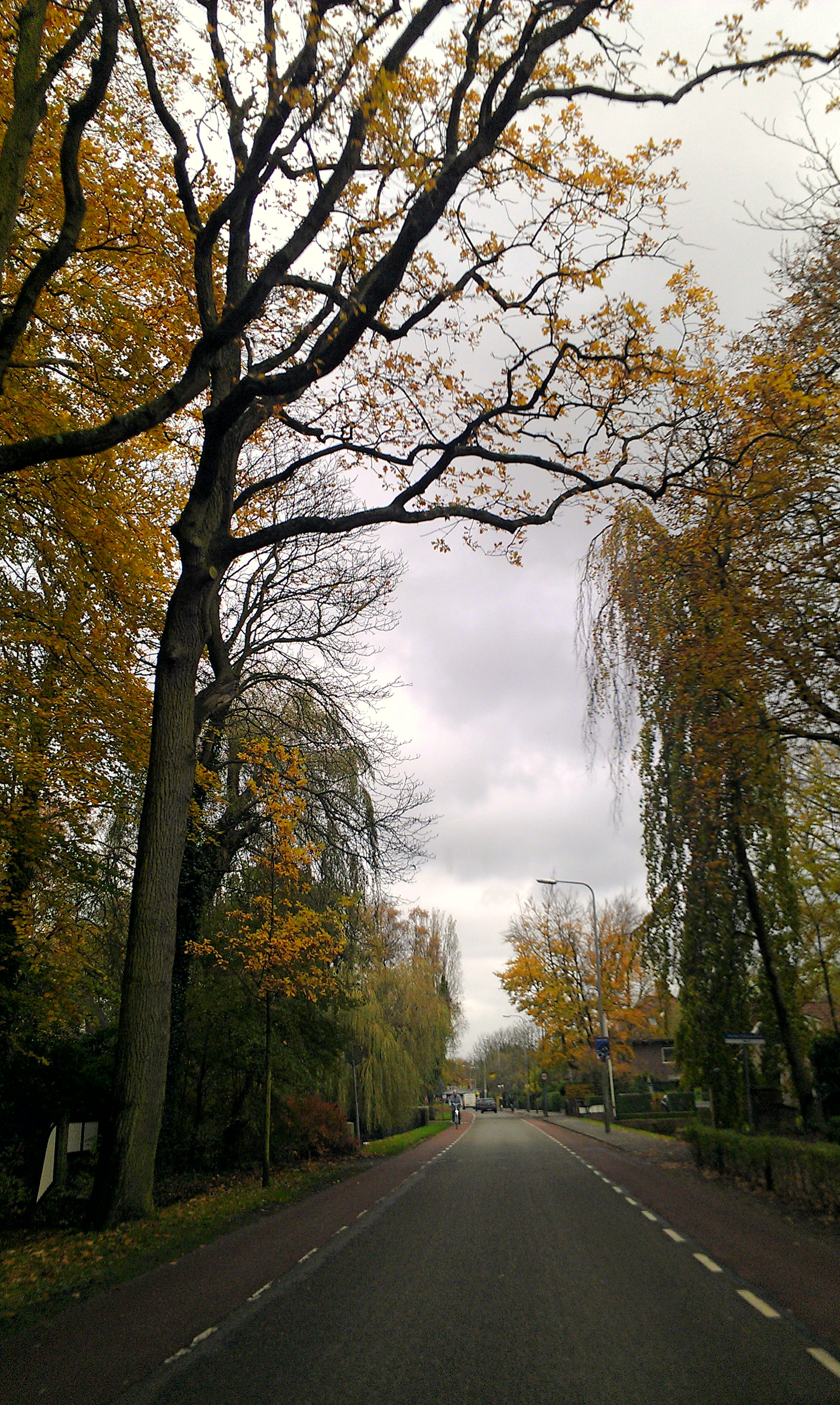
Warmond, - panoramio

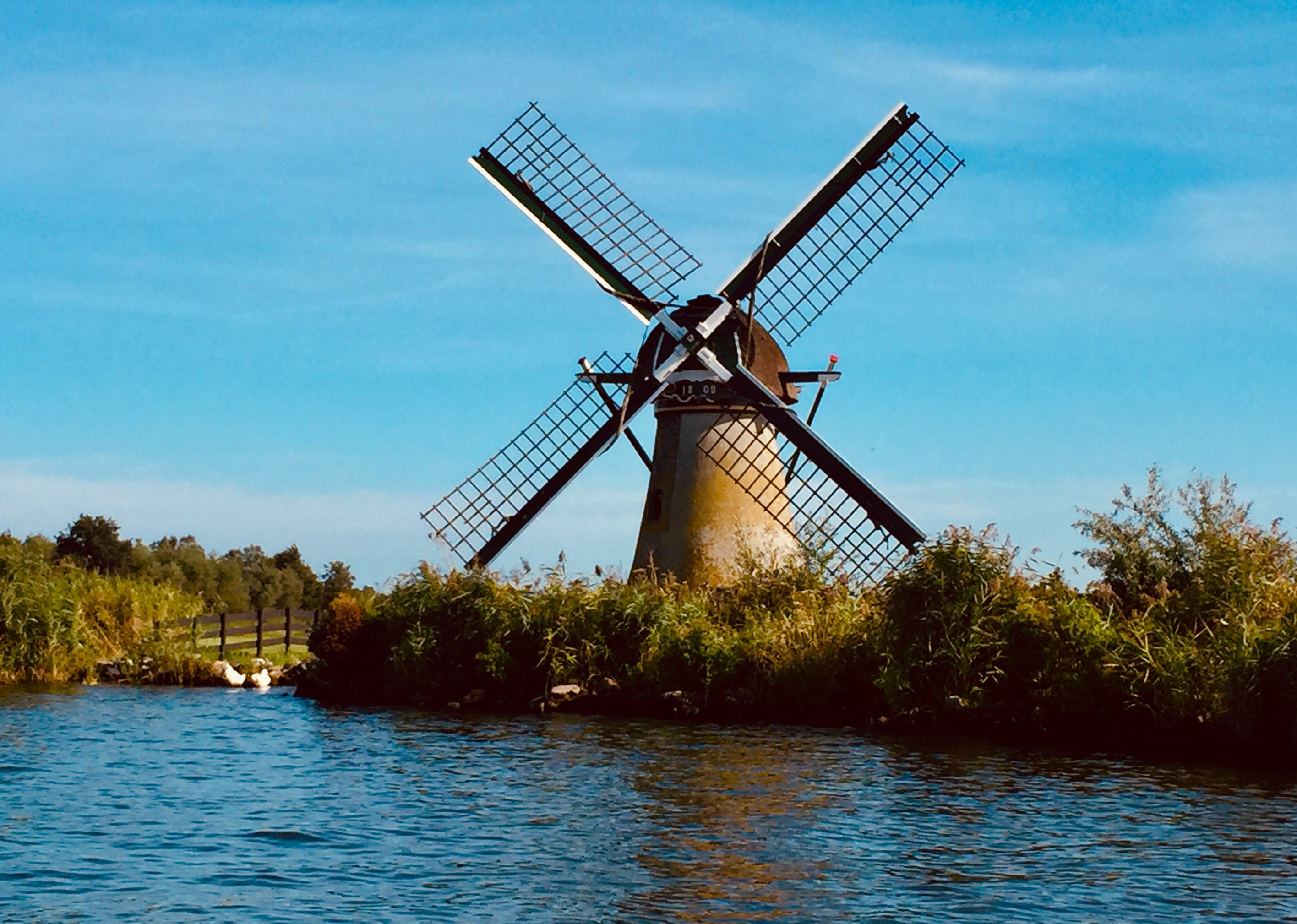
Sailing on the Kaag, Warmond
