= Teylingen Castle =

Dutch castle

- Slot Teylingen
- Voorhout, the Netherlands
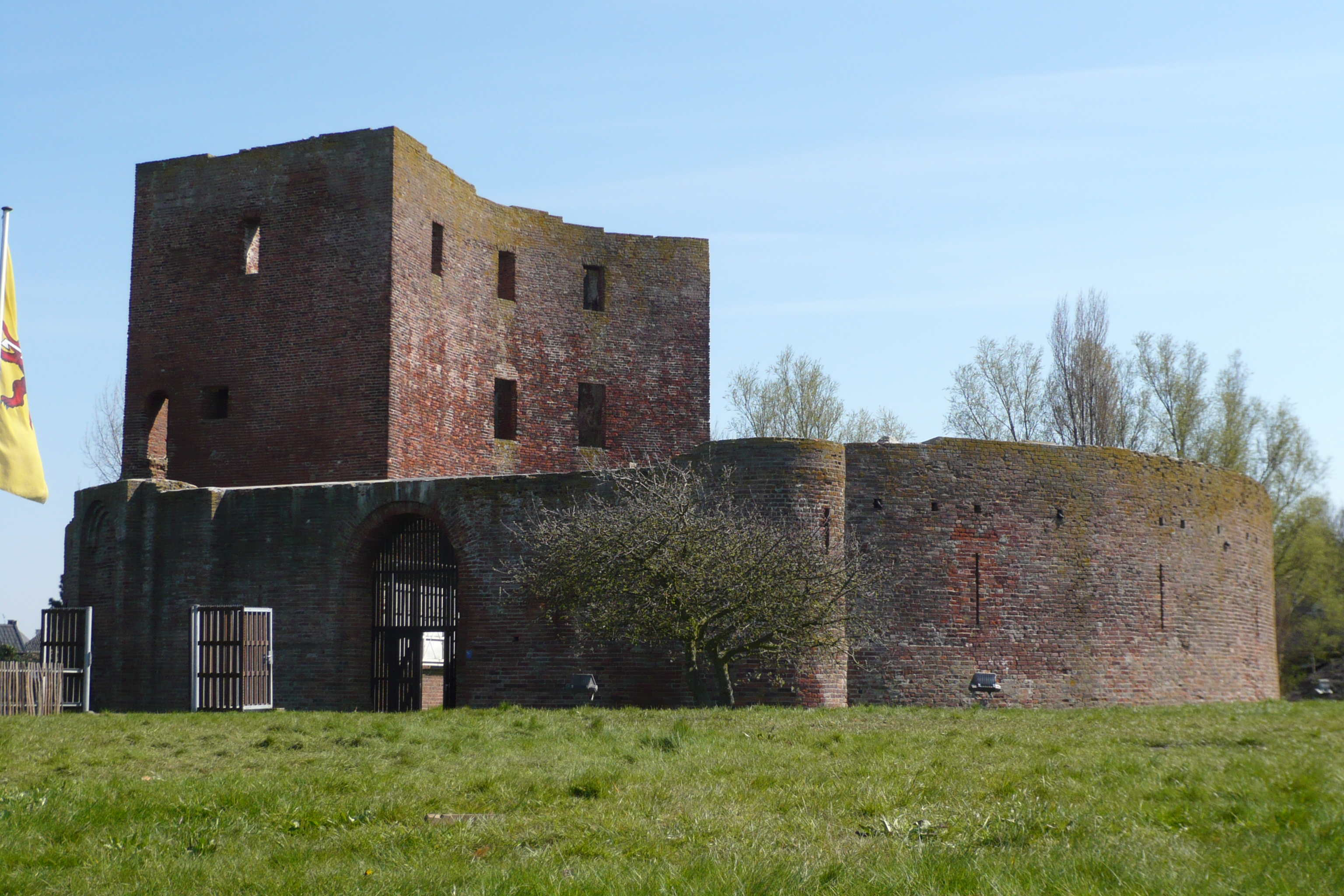
- North side of Teylingen castle in 2010

Site information
- Type: Castle
- Owner: Dutch Government
- Open to the public: Yes
- Condition: Ruin

Location
- the Netherlands
- Coordinates: 52°13′52″N 4°31′9″E

Site history
- Built: 13th century
- Materials: Brick

Teylingen Castle (Dutch: Slot Teylingen) is a Dutch castle in the municipality of Teylingen, in the town of Voorhout, near the border with Sassenheim. It is presumably the family keep of the noble family Van Teylingen, from which the Van Brederode family directly descended.

== History ==
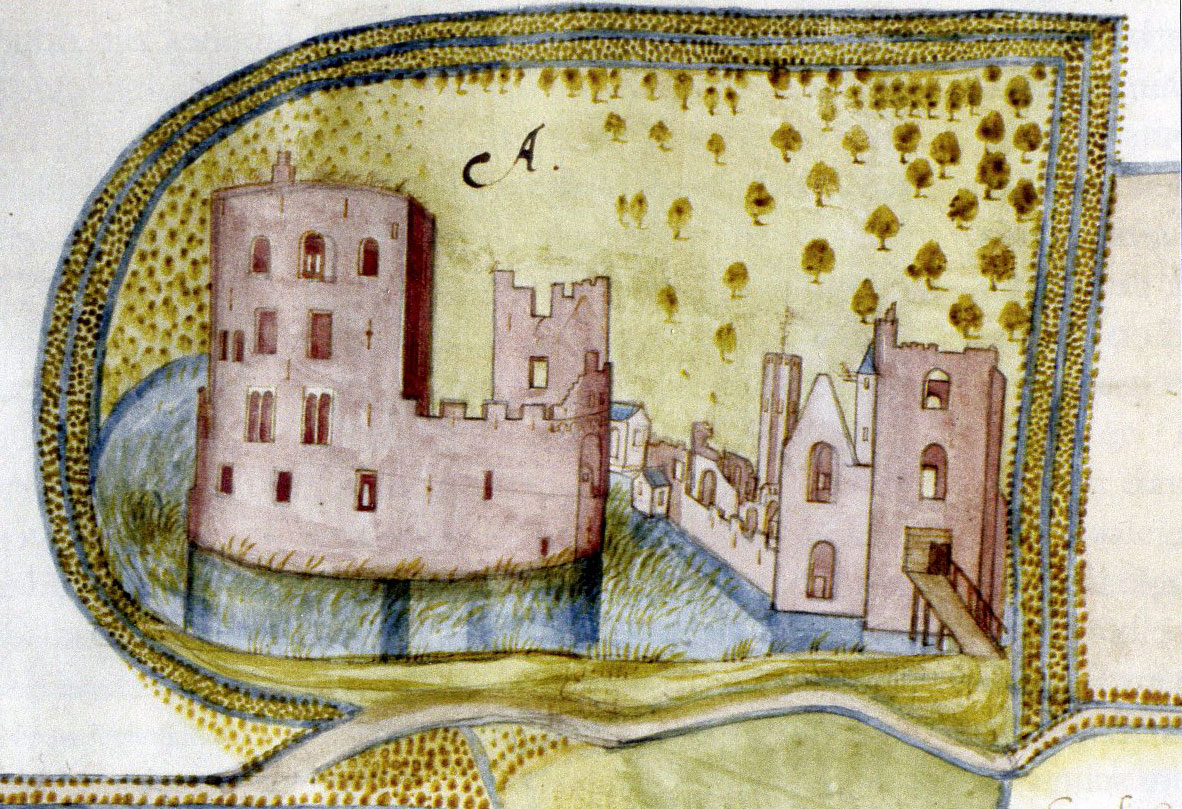
1596 picture by Symon Aerntszoon van Buningen

The castle was originally built to protect the north-south route in Hollandic territory. Later it became a forester's castle of the counts of Holland, starting with William IV, count of Holland.

One of the best known inhabitants of the castle was Jacoba of Bavaria, who died there. At the time of her death she was married to her fourth husband, Frank van Borssele. The drinking cups dug up in the surrounding area are called Jacobakanntjes.

The castle was heavily damaged around 1570 during the Eighty Years' War, and partially restored thereafter. The donjon was partially burnt in 1675, after which decay set in. Other parts were gradually demolished. The lands (and the ruins) became possessions of the province of Holland, and were nationalised in 1795. The grounds were later sold under the condition that the ruins would not be demolished. This made the ruins one of the first examples of the Dutch National Heritage (Dutch: Monumentenzorg).

In 1889, the ruins were donated to the Dutch state by Jhr. Mr. W. van Teylingen. They are still owned by the state, and fall under the jurisdiction of the state's building service, Rijksgebouwendienst. At the end of the 20th century, the ruins were partially restored, and the partially filled in moat was also restored to its original state. The restoration was made possible by the purchase of grounds by the Foundation Slot Teylingen (with support of the Prins Bernhard Cultuurfonds), which then donated the acquired grounds back to the Dutch state.

On 24 June 2023, the Teylingen Castle received the HKV-schildje ("shield") from the Historische Kring Voorhout (The Historical Circle of Voorhout) as a sign of appreciation for the hard work of all the volunteers and professionals in preserving the Teylingen Castle.

== Castle charactertistics ==
The castle started as a round water castle of 37 m diameter with only a ring wall. The ring wall or enceinte dates from the early 13th century. It consists of a massive wall with buttresses on the inside, which support arcs with a chemin de ronde on top. Later in the 13th century the donjon was added and forms part of the wall.

There was also an outer bailey. In the 14th century a comfortable house was built on the outer bailey, but nothing remains of it.

== Varia ==
=== Municipality of Teylingen ===
The municipality of Teylingen is named after the castle, partly because the name Teylingen was also present in the three former municipalities Sassenheim, Voorhout and Warmond.

=== Television ===
In the series Bassie and Adriaan, the villains hid in the castle, and the castle was filmed extensively for the series.

== Inhabitants ==
- Jacqueline, Countess of Hainaut

== See also ==
- List of castles in the Netherlands
