= De Moerbei =

Restaurant in Warmond, Netherlands

Coordinates: 52°11′42.19″N 4°30′10.62″E

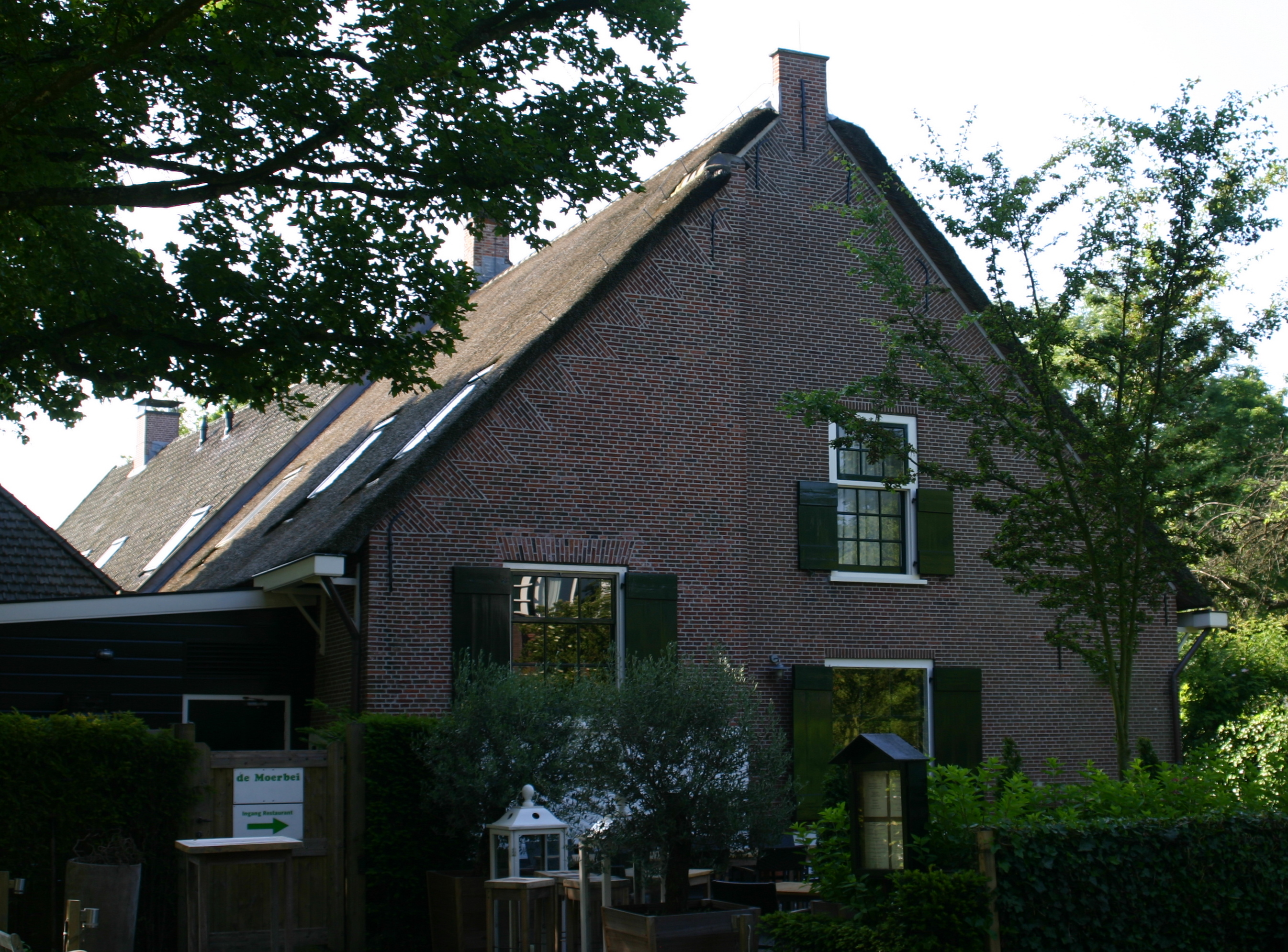
- The restaurant's exterior
- Interactive map of De Moerbei

Restaurant information
- Established: abt. 1995
- Head chef: Hans de Bont
- Food type: French, regional
- Rating: Michelin Guide
- Location: Dorpsstraat 5a, Warmond, 2361 AK, Netherlands
- Seating capacity: 65
- Website: Official website

De Moerbei is a restaurant in Warmond, Netherlands. It is a fine dining restaurant that was awarded one Michelin star for the period 2009–present. The restaurant held a Bib Gourmand in the period 2000–2003.

GaultMillau awarded the restaurant 14 out of 20 points.

Owner and head chef of De Moerbei is Hans de Bont. De Bont, co-owner together with his wife Maître/sommelier Anjo de Bont, opened the restaurant in about 1995.

The restaurant was originally located "Lange Voort 11 b-e" in Oegstgeest, but moved to Warmond in 2005.

== See also ==
- List of Michelin starred restaurants in the Netherlands
