= Voorhout =

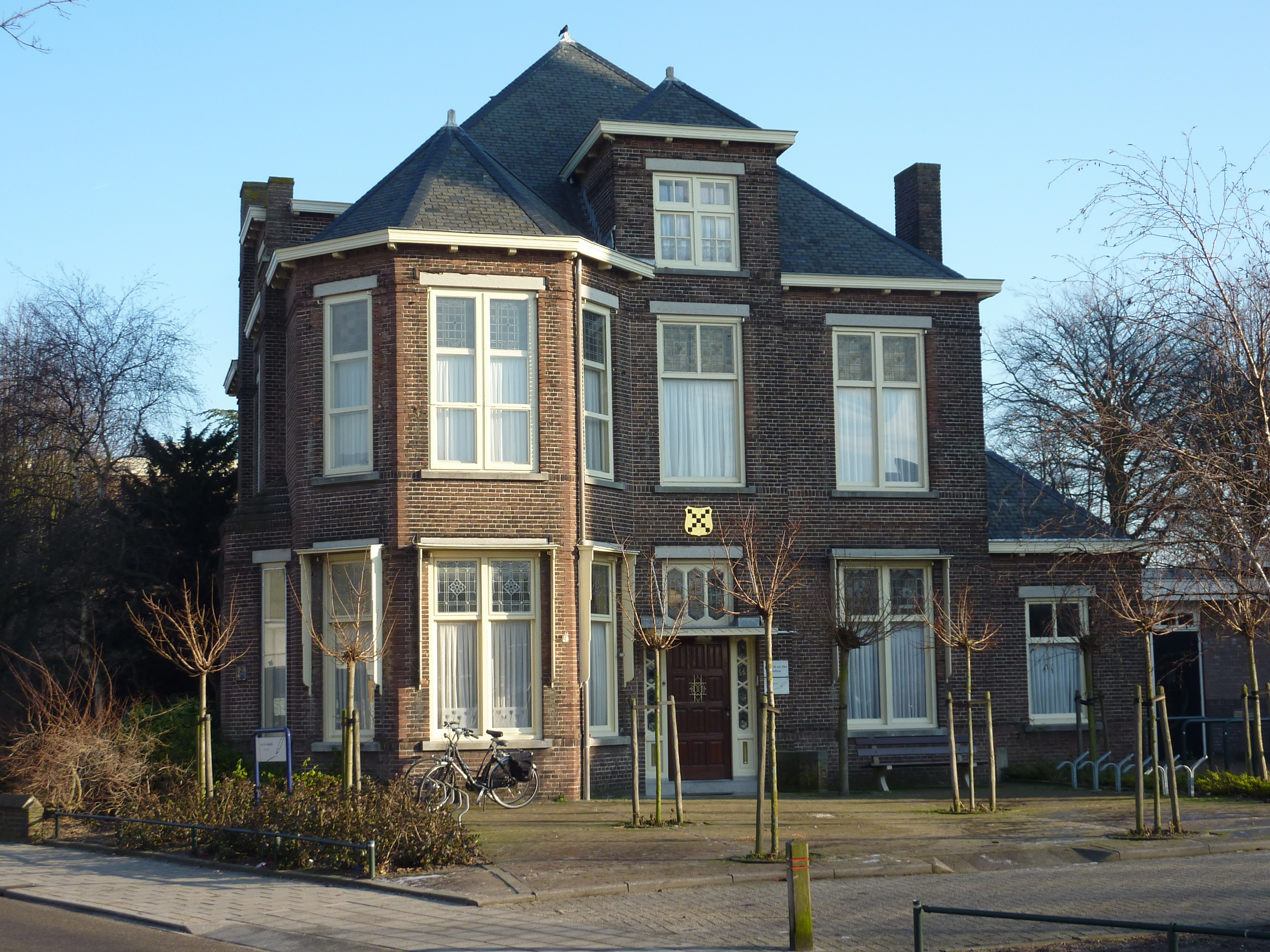

- Flag Coat of arms
- Interactive map of Voorhout
- Coordinates: 52°13′23″N 4°29′11″E
- Country: Netherlands
- Province: South Holland
- Water board: Hoogheemraadschap van Rijnland
- Municipality: Teylingen

Area
  - Total: 12.62 km^{2} (4.87 sq mi)

Population (2017)
  - Total: 15,620

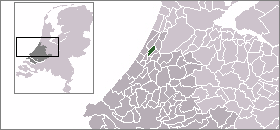
Location of Voorhout

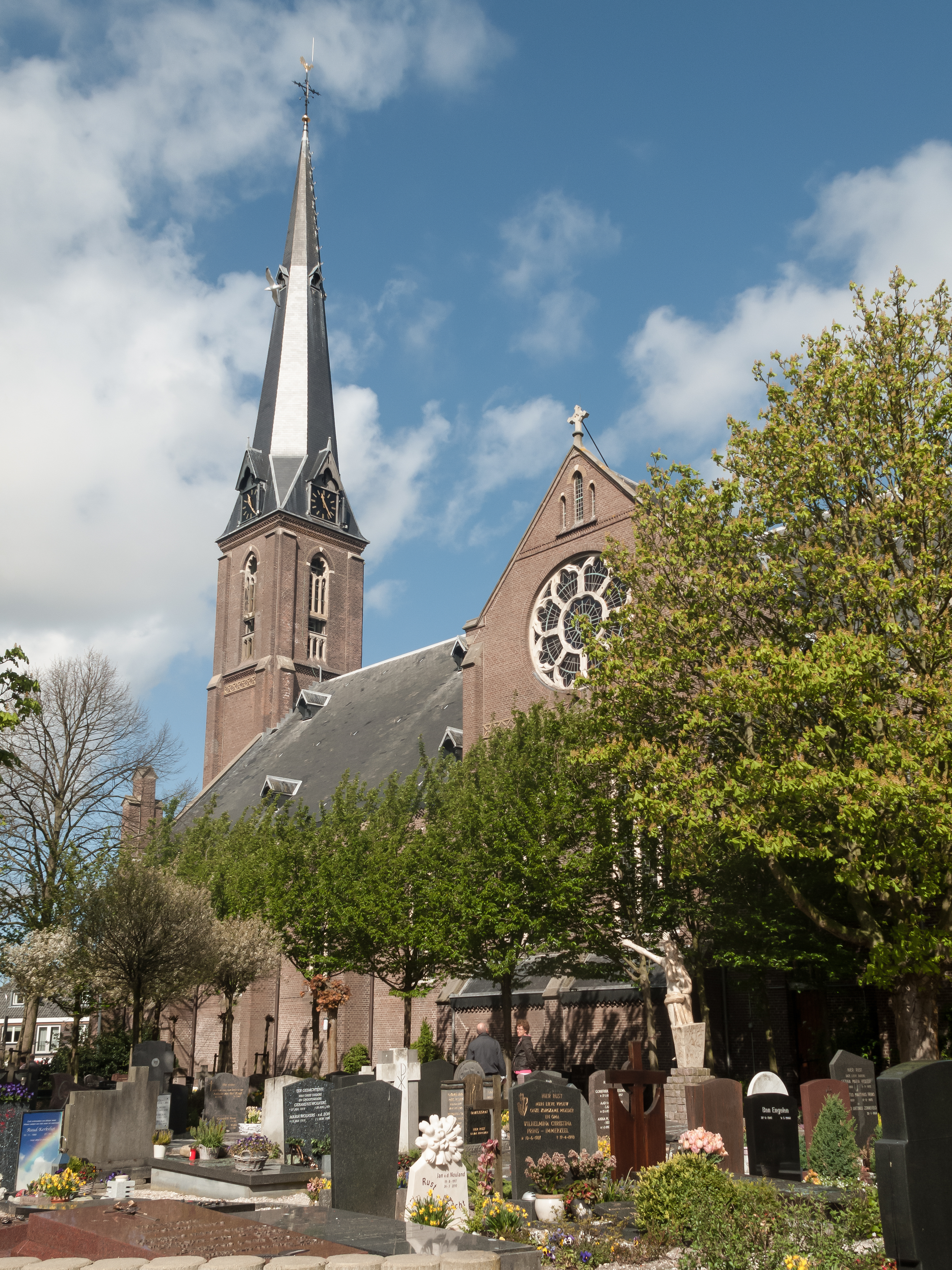
Church: de Sint Bartholomeuskerk

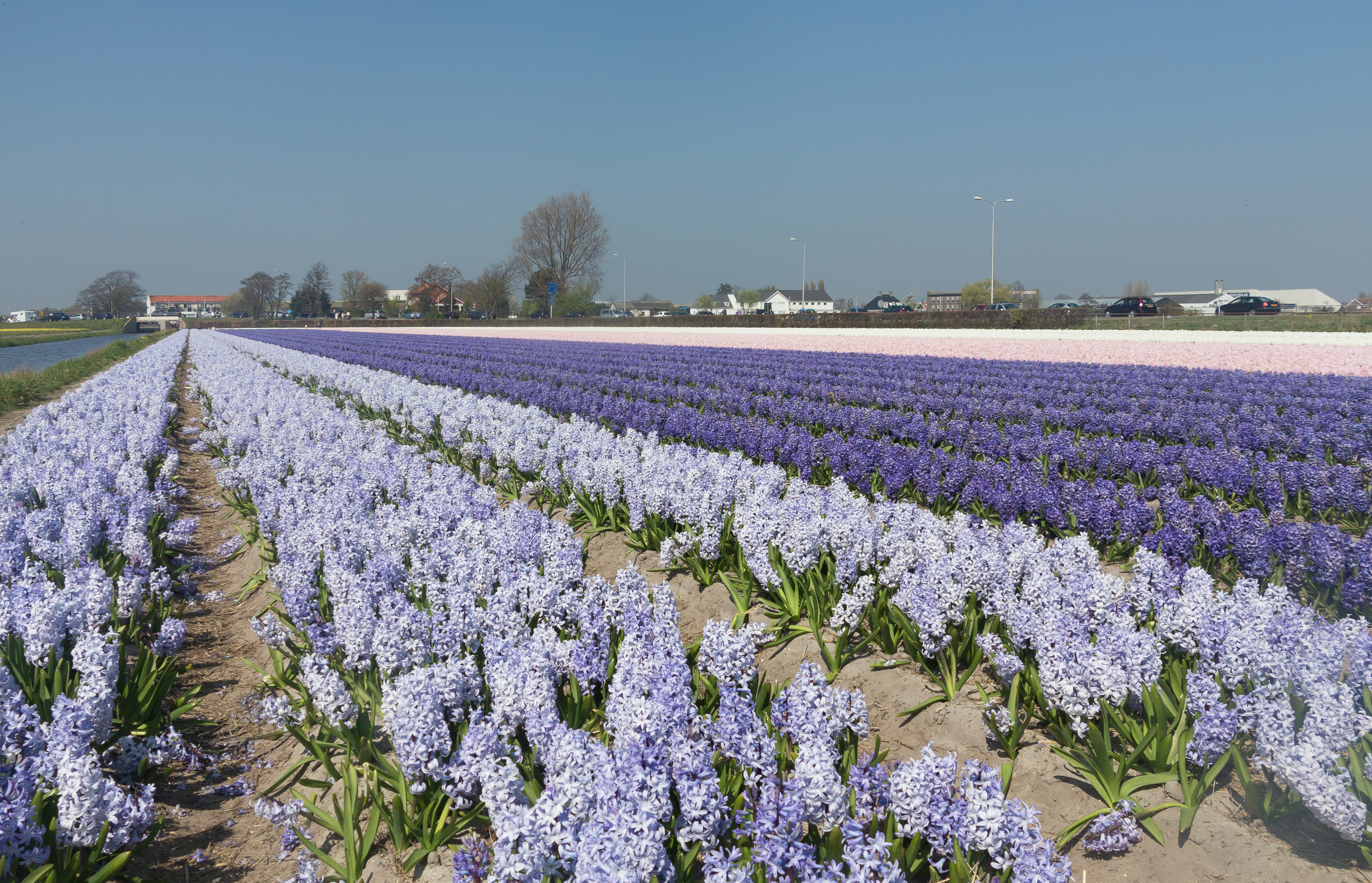
Field with hyacinths

Voorhout (Dutch pronunciation: [ˈvoːrɦʌut]) is a village and former municipality in the western Netherlands, in the province of South Holland. The former municipality covered an area of 12.59 km^{2} (4.86 sq mi) of which 0.33 km^{2} (0.13 sq mi) is covered by water, and had a population of 14,792 in 2004. Together with Sassenheim and Warmond, it became part of the Teylingen municipality on January 1, 2006. Voorhout is located in an area called the "Dune and Bulb Region" (Duin- en Bollenstreek).

It also included the communities of Piet Gijzenbrug (partly) and Teijlingen with the Slot Teylingen.

== History ==
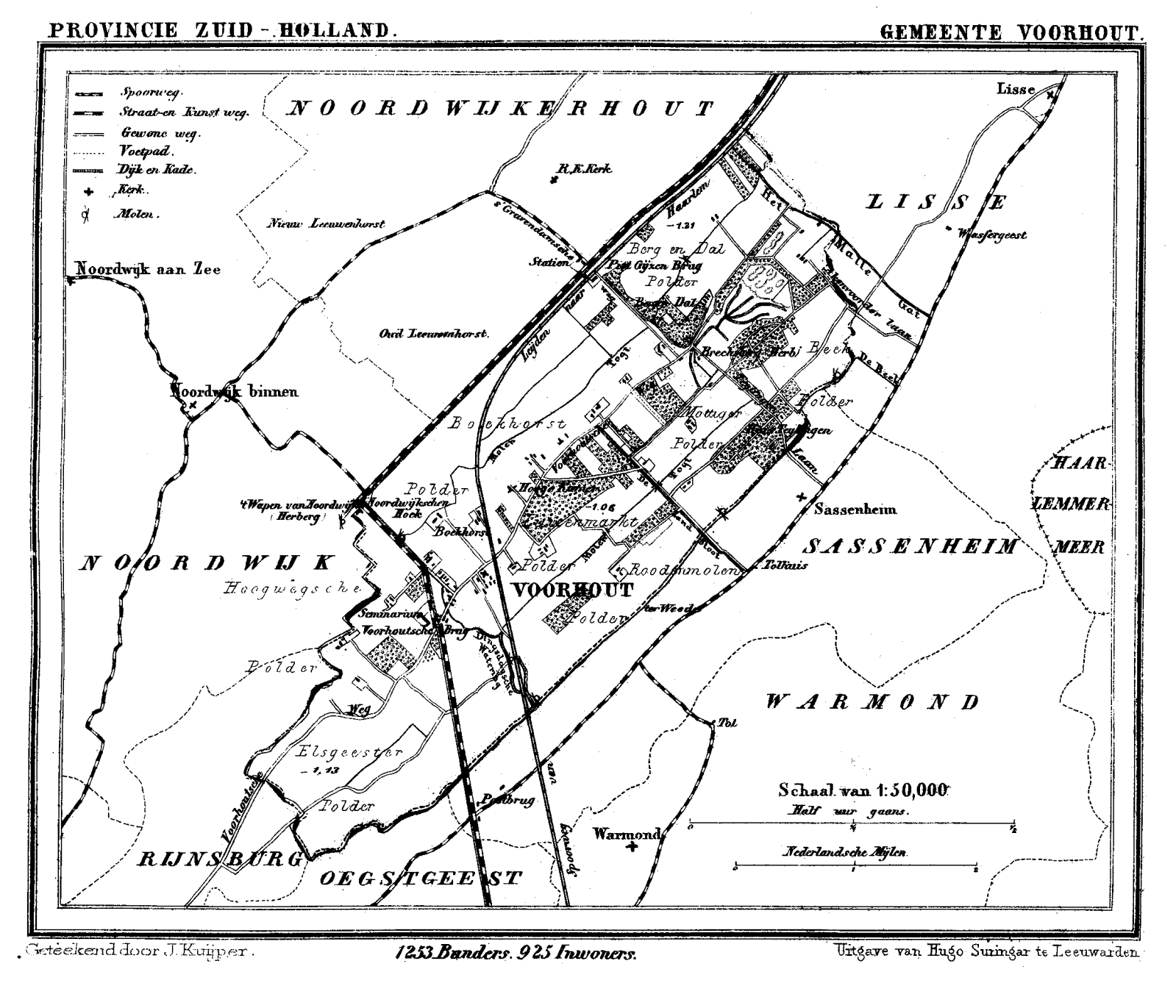
Historic 1867 map of Voorhout

In 1988 Voorhout celebrated its 1000th anniversary. A letter mentioning Voorhout from 988 states that count Dirk II of Holland granted the church of "Foranholte" (the old name of Voorhout) to Egmond Abbey. The second part of the name –holte or –hout (meaning "wood") is a reference to the dune area that was supposedly very wooded at the time. Settlements arose around this area, and Voorhout arose in front of a forest. The nearby Noordwijkerhout also refers to this forest, just like Holland, which is a degeneration of Holtland, meaning woodland.

The area was inhabited long before 988 with Roman coins having been found. In 1907 a farmer found 18 bronze axes and 1 chisel, about 3500 years old, at the Rijnsburgerweg. They are now on display in the Rijksmuseum van Oudheden in Leiden.

Since 1150 the nobles of Teylingen took an important role in the area. Dutch Counts regularly met at Slot Teylingen. The most important inhabitant of the castle was Jacoba van Beieren. Voorhout still remained a small settlement. In 1514 there were only 40 recorded houses.

In 1657 the Leidsevaart canal was dug, going from Haarlem to Leiden and Voorhout started to grow because of this. In 1842 the Haarlem-Leiden train line was opened and Voorhout got two halts, one in the hamlet of Piet Gijzenbrug near Noordwijk and another called Voorhout. In 1900 Voorhout had about 2000 inhabitants. After 1944 new roads were constructed and both stations closed for passenger transport. In 1960 about 5000 people lived in Voorhout. By 1988 that number had grown to 9360, the growth caused by the establishment of the new neighbourhood of Oosthout. In 1997 Voorhout got a train station again. More neighborhoods were constructed and the population continued to grow. On January 1, 2005, Voorhout had 14,919 inhabitants.

Until World War II the main source of income in Voorhout was from the flower bulb industry. Today only a small proportion of the population still work in bulb cultivation. Most work outside of Voorhout. On January 1, 2006, the municipalities of Voorhout, Warmond and Sassenheim merged to form the new municipality of Teylingen to the dismay of some of the inhabitants.

== Famous inhabitants ==
=== Born in Voorhout ===
- Herman Scholten (31 December 1668), botanist, humanist and physician of European fame
- Edwin van der Sar (29 October 1970), football player (goalkeeper)
- Rob van Dijk (15 January 1969), football player (goalkeeper)

=== Lived in Voorhout ===
- Jacqueline of Bavaria (Le Quesnoy, 16 July 1401 – Slot Teylingen, 9 October 1436), Countess of Holland, lived for a few years in Slot Teylingen
- Carlo l'Ami, old football player (goalkeeper) and later goalkeeper's trainer by AFC Ajax, in Amsterdam
- Truus van Aalten (Arnhem, 2 August 1910 - Warmond, 27 June 1999), actress, she ran a souvenir import/export business in Voorhout after 1954, after the Nazis ended her career as a film comedian in Germany
- Marco van Basten (31 October 1964), former football player (Striker) and later a coach at AFC Ajax, SC Heerenveen and AZ Alkmaar
- Frank van Borssele (1395–1470), Stadholder (Governor) of Holland and Zeeland provinces, Count of Oostervant, fourth husband of Jacoba van Beieren, lived for a few years in Slot Teylingen
- Edwin van der Sar (29 October 1970), goalkeeper for AFC Ajax, Juventus, Fulham, Manchester United and the National team, started career at VV Foreholte

== Sights ==
- Teylingen Castle, in Dutch: Slot Teylingen (monument)
- The Boerhaave House, in Dutch: het Boerhaavehuis (monument)
- Small Church, in Dutch: Kleine Kerk (monument)
- Saint-Bartholomew Church (or Big Church), in Dutch: Sint-Bartholomeüskerk (of Grote Kerk)
- Polder Mill Hope Brings Life, in Dutch: Poldermolen Hoop Doet Leven (monument)
- Tulipland Panorama, in Dutch: Panorama Tulipland (discontinued since 2011)
- The Hooghkamer Farm, in Dutch: De Hooghkamer (monument)
- Rijnoord Farm, in Dutch: Rijnoord Boerderij (monument)
- Klein Bouwlust Farm, in Dutch: Klein Bouwlust (monument)
- Noordhout Farm, in Dutch: Noordhout (monument)

== Organisations ==
=== Sport clubs ===
- VV Foreholte, football club
- h.v. Foreholte, handball club
- MHC Voorhout, hockey club
- SV Voorhout, tennis club
- TV Voorhout, tennis club
- De Columbiaan, swimming club
- Forwodians, basketball club
- Bacluvo, badminton club
- Inspiration, majorettes and twirl club

=== Music organisations ===
- Sint Cecilia, Roman Catholic music organisation
