= Piet van der Lans =

Dutch track cyclist

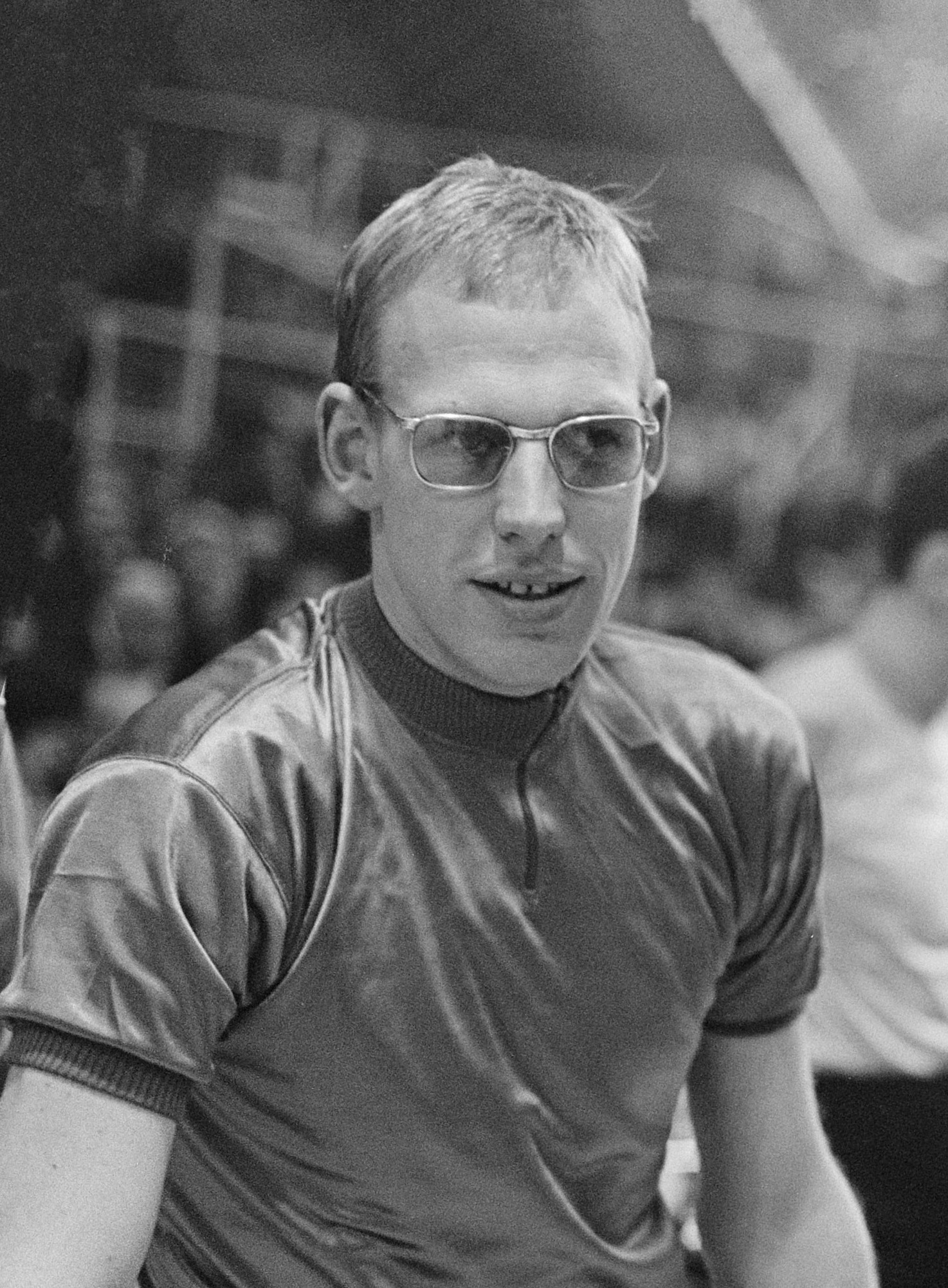
- Piet van der Lans in 1966

Personal information
- Born: 10 September 1940 Sassenheim, the Netherlands
- Died: 27 January 2018 (aged 77)
- Height: 1.78 m (5 ft 10 in)
- Weight: 76 kg (168 lb)

Sport
- Sport: Cycling

Petrus Johannes Marinus "Piet" van der Lans (10 September 1940 – 27 January 2018) was a Dutch track cyclist. He competed at the 1960 Summer Olympics in the 4 km team pursuit and finished in fifth place.

== See also ==
- List of Dutch Olympic cyclists
