= Han Zuilhof =

Dutch chemist (born 1965)

Johannes Ternis "Han" Zuilhof
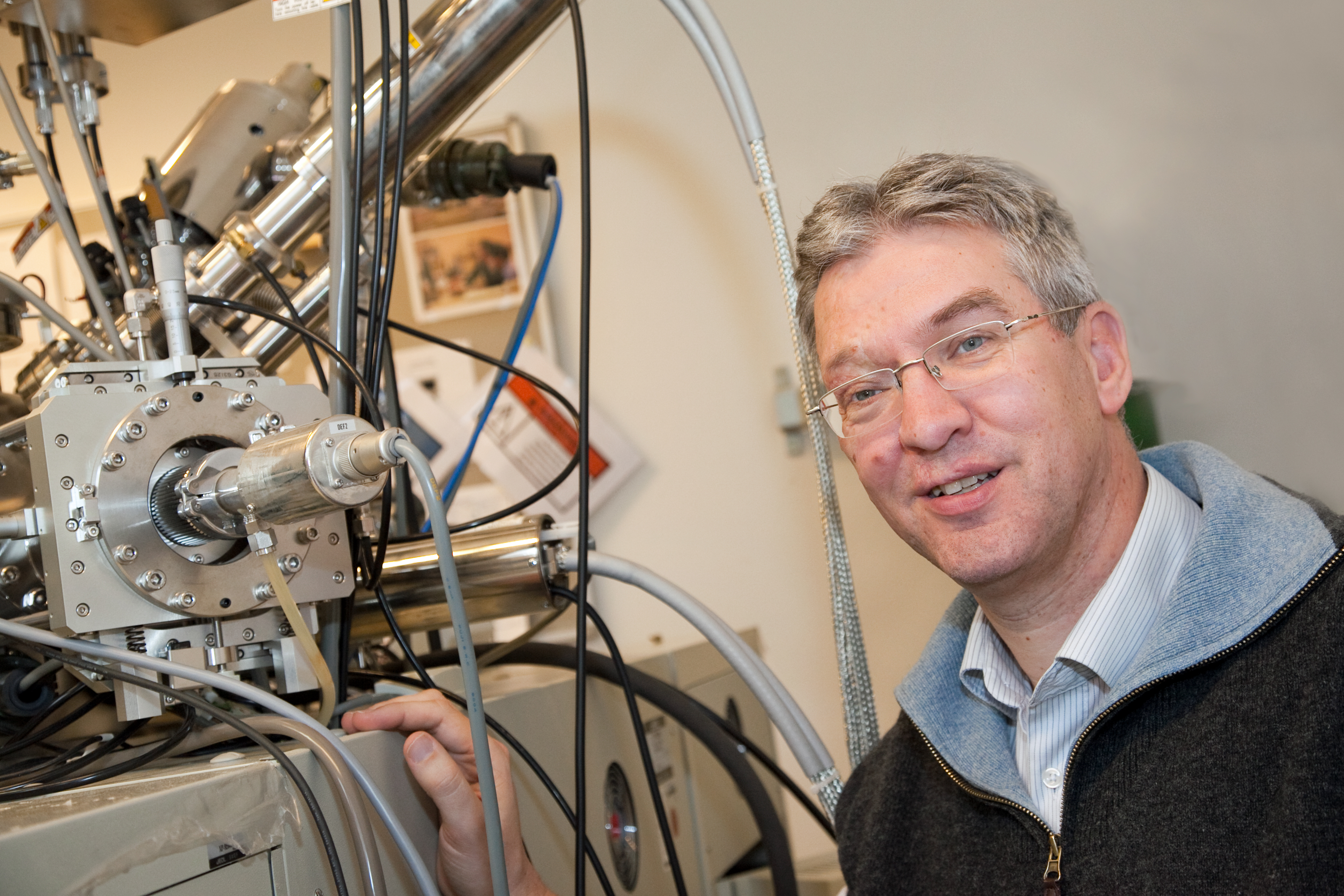
- Han Zuilhof, Chair of Organic Chemistry, Wageningen University, 2015
- Born: May 21, 1965 (age 61); Sassenheim, The Netherlands
- Scientific career
- Fields: organic chemistry, bionanotechnology, surface science
- Workplaces: Wageningen University, Tianjin University, Jiaxing University; AFSG

Han Zuilhof (born 1965) holds the chair of organic chemistry at Wageningen University. His interests focus on organic reactions that work efficiently under very mild conditions, surface-bound (bio-)organic chemistry and the development of analytical chemistry tools.

Zuilhof obtained an M.Sc. in chemistry and M.A. in philosophy from Leiden University. After a Ph.D. in organic chemistry (Leiden University, 1994) and postdoctoral work at the University of Rochester and Columbia University, he joined the faculty at Wageningen University. He has been a professor of organic chemistry since 2007. He was an adjunct professor of chemical engineering at King Abdulaziz University in Jeddah, Saudi Arabia (2011-2022). He is a Perennial Distinguished Guest Professor of molecular science and medicinal chemistry at the school of pharmaceutical science and technology (SPST) at Tianjin University, China since 2014, and obtained the Top-Talent Distinguished Professorship of Molecular Science at Jiaxing University, China in 2023. In 2024, he won the Top-Talent Award of Zhejiang Province, China, to set up a center for click chemistry in materials science.

He serves/served on the editorial advisory boards of Langmuir, Advanced Materials Interfaces and Applied Surface Science and was a senior editor of Langmuir from 2016 to 2020. In 2021, he was awarded, amongst others with Barry Sharpless and John Moses, the Robert Robinson Award in Synthetic Organic Chemistry by the Royal Society of Chemistry for contributions to click chemistry. He is also the founder (2011) of a spin-off company, Surfix.

His recent work includes the discovery of tiara[5]arenes, intrinsically chiral click reactions requiring no chiral auxiliary or catalyst, and the synthesis and structure elucidation of SOF_{4}-based SuFEx-derived polymers.
