= Frank Ammerlaan =

Dutch artist

Frank Ammerlaan (born 1979 in Sassenheim) is a Dutch artist who lives and works in London.

== Biography ==
Ammerlaan graduated as an independent artist from the Gerrit Rietveld Academie in Amsterdam in 2007. In 2012 he graduated in fine art at the Royal College of Art in London with paintings, sculptures and photography. For his graduation show Ammerlaan won The Land Securities Studio Award. In 2012 he received the Royal Award for Painting, which is handed to the most promising young Dutch painter of that year. From 2012, Ammerlaan also makes video art. Ammerlaan experiments with unusual materials, like galvanised and passivated metals and pulverized meteorite. He exhibited in several museums and galleries in the Netherlands and abroad.

Ammerlaan is one of the founders of the exhibition spaces Horse Move Project Space (2004) and De Service Garage (2007), both situated in Amsterdam. Currently De Service Garage is giving space to seven artists and is run by Benjamin Roth and Daniel Hofstede.

== Work ==
Most characteristic for Ammerlaan's work are his monumental colorful paintings. His oeuvre includes works in which subtle stains of color appear on an otherwise black canvas. The surface seems to be calm from afar, but when you approach it subtly changes.

Ammerlaan's work does not try to provoke emotions. The emphasis lies in showing barely perceptible changes. Another series of colorful paintings are embroidered with thin, shiny, sometimes fluorescent threads, which frame and structure the surface. The fragile threads change color with changing light and sometimes seem to fade into the background. The geometrical patterns of thread create a permeable fence, like a web or weave which you can seemingly get stuck in or hold onto. These works are illuminating and seductive though ultimately deny the viewer access.

In the recent years Frank Ammerlaan has diversified his practice to include sculpture, photography and video. Painting, however, remains his most important medium. His series of small sensitive sculptures, made of different types of conductive metal, form repetitive geometric shapes originating from aerial and antenna structures. The sculptures suggest a biomimicry-related language ready to receive and transmit signals and information.

In 2010 Ammerlaan developed a practice of painting with chemicals. Having done research for a number of years with chemists and scientists he physicalized the phenomenal aesthetics of organic color arrangements – visible on a rainy urban day – in the form of oil spills. The result is extremely detailed, holographic but toxic, and becomes noxious in our contemporary political context.

More work:

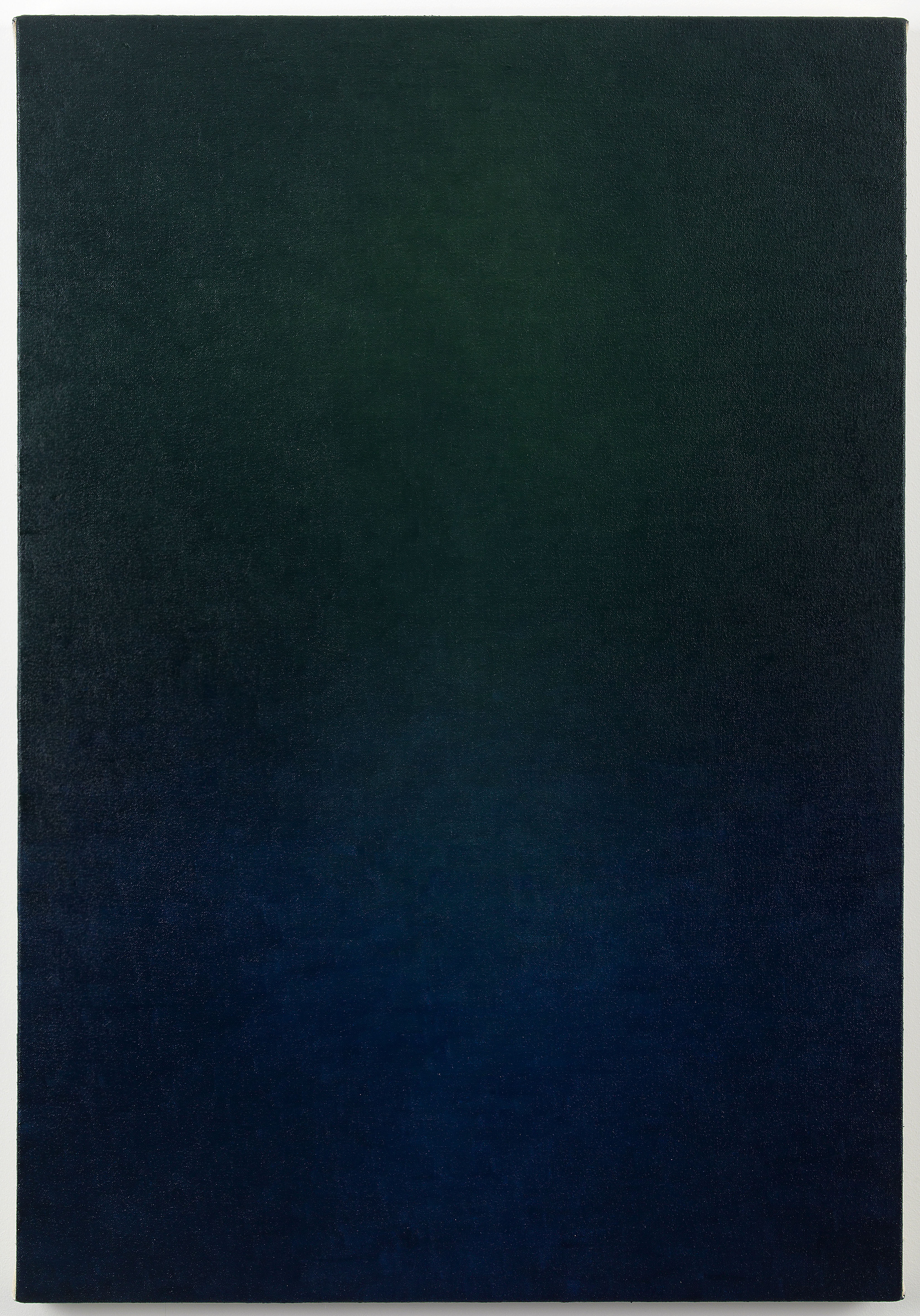
Frank Ammerlaan, 2012, Untitled, Oil on canvas, 81,5 x 56 cm

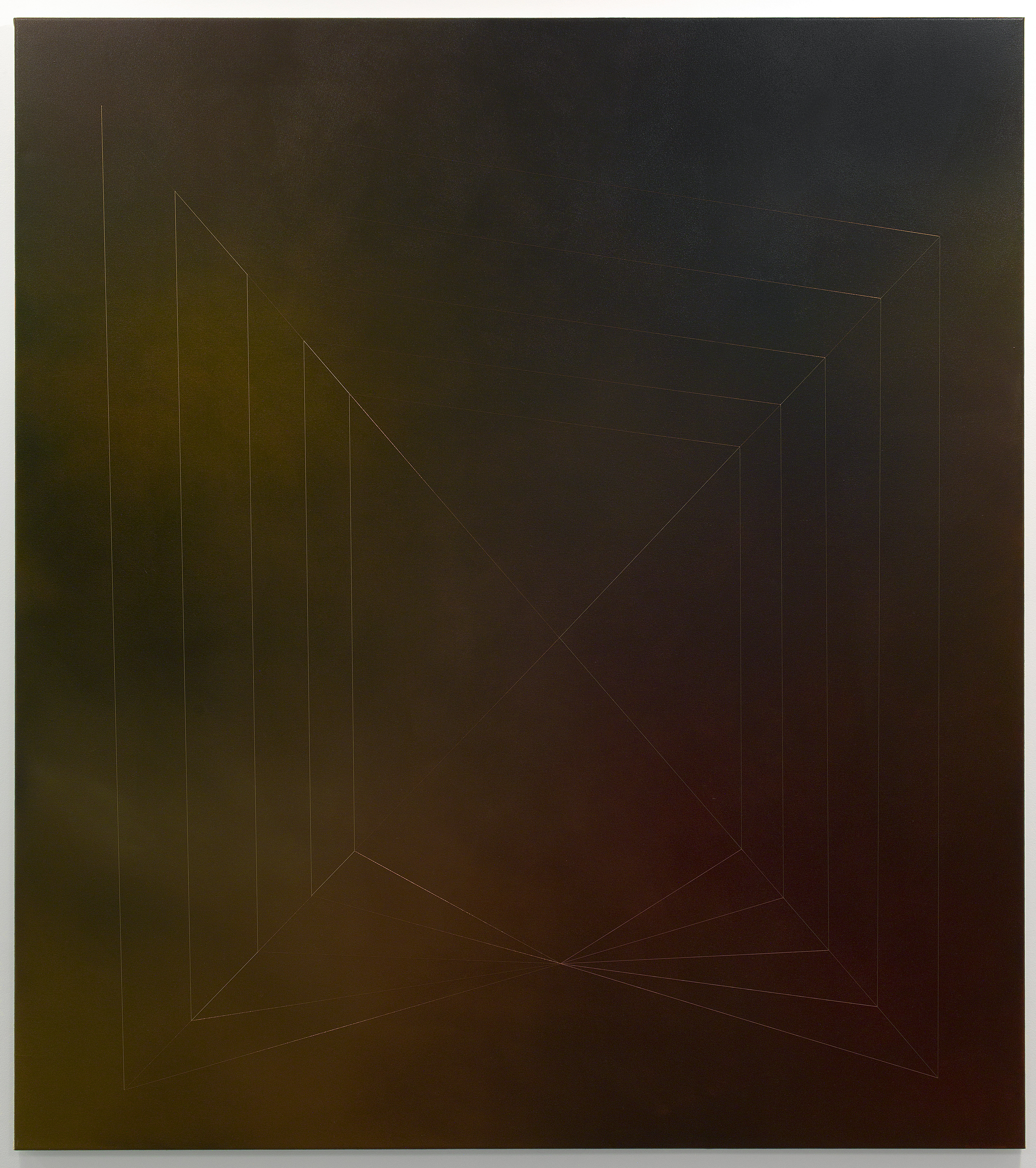
Frank Ammerlaan, 2012, Untitled, Oil and thread on canvas, 180 x 160 cm

== Prizes and scholarships ==
- 2013 The Scheffer Award
- 2013 Residency Fondazione MACC Museo d'Arte Conteporanea in Calasetta, Italy
- 2012 Land Securities prize
- 2012 Doha Studio Art prize
- 2012 Royal Award for Painting
- 2011 Nomination Royal Award for Painting
- 2010 Nomination Royal Award for Painting
- 2010 Fund BKVB abroad scholarship (till 2012)
- 2010 Hendrik Muller Fund
- 2009 Nomination Royal Award for Painting
- 2009 Scholarship Fund BKVB
- 2009 Foundation Niemeijer fund
- 2007 Gerrit Rietveld Academie Award for Painting
