= Patty Trossèl =

Dutch singer and composer (born 1963)

Patty Trossèl (born 1963, in Sassenheim, Netherlands) is a Dutch singer and composer who performs under the name La Pat. She sang a unique mix of cabaret, big band, vaudeville, pre-war styled chansons as well as extraordinary stage outfits.

== Education and career ==
Trossèl's musical career started at age 18 with the new wave band To Lips, in which she sang and played keyboards. A few years later she left the band and entered the School of Performing Arts in Amsterdam. In 1986 she started the band La Pat as a school project. Soon she was touring through the Netherlands with a nine-piece band.

In 1986 she composed the music for the children's tv show Theo En Thea.

In 1989 she signed with EMI and released her debut album Eine Frau für die Liebe, which contained songs in German, English, French, Italian and Hungarian. She gained critical acclaim for the CD and the live shows, and had a hit single with “Keukenhof.” The same year she also composed the music for the movie Het Tenenkaas Imperium.

At the end of 1991 Patty returned to the stage with her second CD La Gabbia D’Oro (EMI), an Italian opera which she wrote with Peter van Hintem and Indera Nicolina. The opera had piano, two violins, a cello and a bandoneon. The premiere was at the Concertgebouw (Amsterdam’s ancient classical music hall), and a tour through the Netherlands and Belgium followed. In 1992 Patty was presented with the Edison Award for the CD.

In 1995 Patty returned to the stage. This time she made a mini CD called Witchwaltz with eight songs, all in English, with a laid-back, jazzy atmosphere. It was followed one year later by Gevleugelde Donna (Movieplay, 1996), a diverse collection of songs in many different languages, for the first time also in Dutch.

It was a journey through India that inspired Patty to write her next CD Lotusfeet (2002), an intense collection of songs based on Indian poems, translated into English and recorded with only piano, accordion and violin and for the first time released under her own name. It was followed by concerts in 2003 and 2004.

Patty's sixth CD Erinnerung contains songs, all in German, based on poems by Rainer Maria Rilke. It was released in 2008.

== Discography ==
=== Studio albums ===
Eine Frau fur die Liebe (1989)

La Gabbia D'Oro (1991)

Witchwaltz (1995)

Gevleugelde Donna (1996)

Lotusfeet (2002)

Erinnerung (2008) La La Land Records

The Little Toilings Of The Honeybee (2017)

=== Compilations ===
The Best Of La Pat Part 1 (2010)
