= Warmond =

- Village
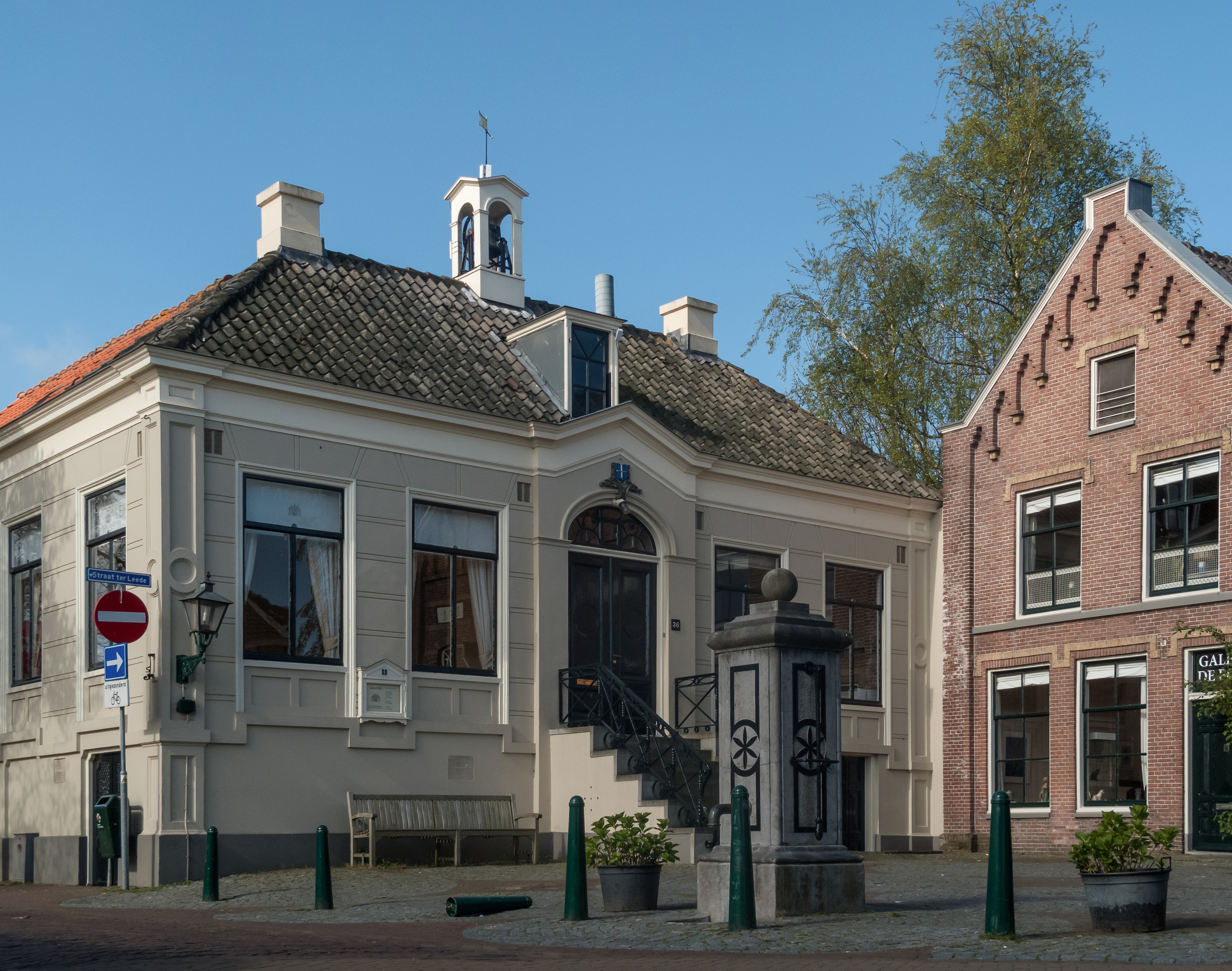
- Former Warmond Town Hall

- Flag Coat of arms

- Location in South Holland
- Coordinates: 52°11′50″N 4°30′6″E
- Country: Netherlands
- Province: South Holland
- Municipality: Teylingen

Population (1 January 2021)
  - Total: 5,020

Warmond (Dutch pronunciation: [ˈʋɑrmɔnt]) is a village and former municipality in the Western Netherlands, north of Leiden in the province of South Holland. The municipality covered an area of 14.42 km^{2} (5.57 sq mi), of which 4.42 km^{2} (1.71 sq mi) is water; had a population of 4,977 in 2004. Together with Sassenheim and Voorhout, it became part of the Teylingen municipality on 1 January 2006. Warmond, which is located in an area called the "Dune and Bulb Region" (Duin- en Bollenstreek), is notable for being very affluent.

Warmond is situated on a lake system called Kagerplassen and has several marinas which make it a popular recreational area for boating and other water sports.

An 18th-century mansion called "Huys te Warmond" ("House at Warmond") is located north of the village along the main road.

The Major Seminary, Warmond, was founded here in 1799. Located in a converted in the former French Boarding School, it provided training for Priests until 1967. The only known surviving copy of Joos Lambrecht Dutch-French dictionary, the Naembouck, was discovered by Wytze Hellinga in the library here shortly after it was closed.

The first railway accident in the Netherlands occurred near Warmond on 10 March 1843. 1 person was killed.

== Demographics (2000) ==
When it was a municipality, Warmond had the highest death rate in all of Netherlands. (22.3 per 1000 in 2004, three times the national average). Now Laren has the highest Death Rate in all of Netherlands.

- Birth Rate: 8.97 per 1000 (2000)
- Death Rate: 23.10 per 1000 (2000)
- NGR: -1.41% per year (2000).
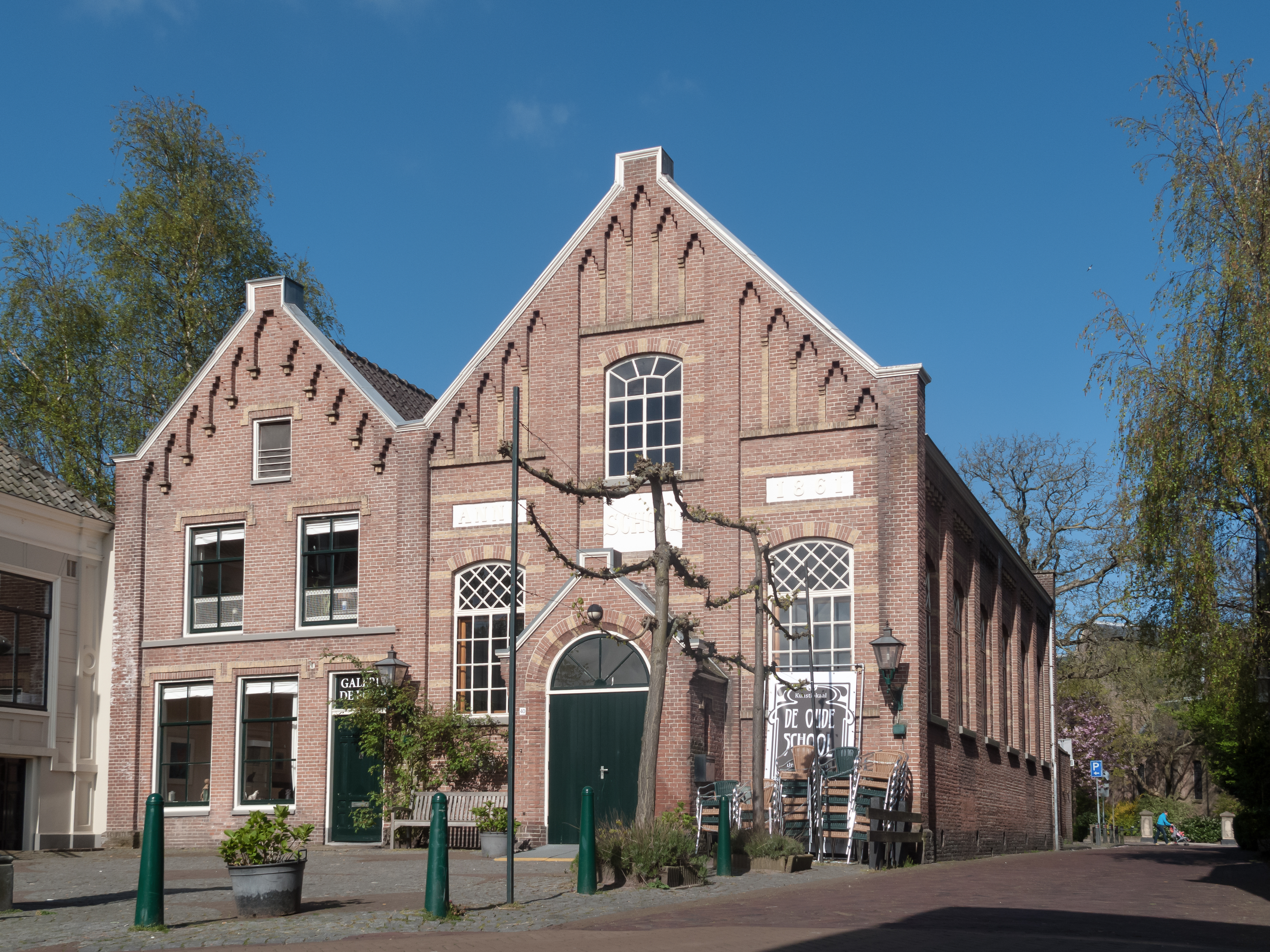
Warmond, restaurant in monumental house

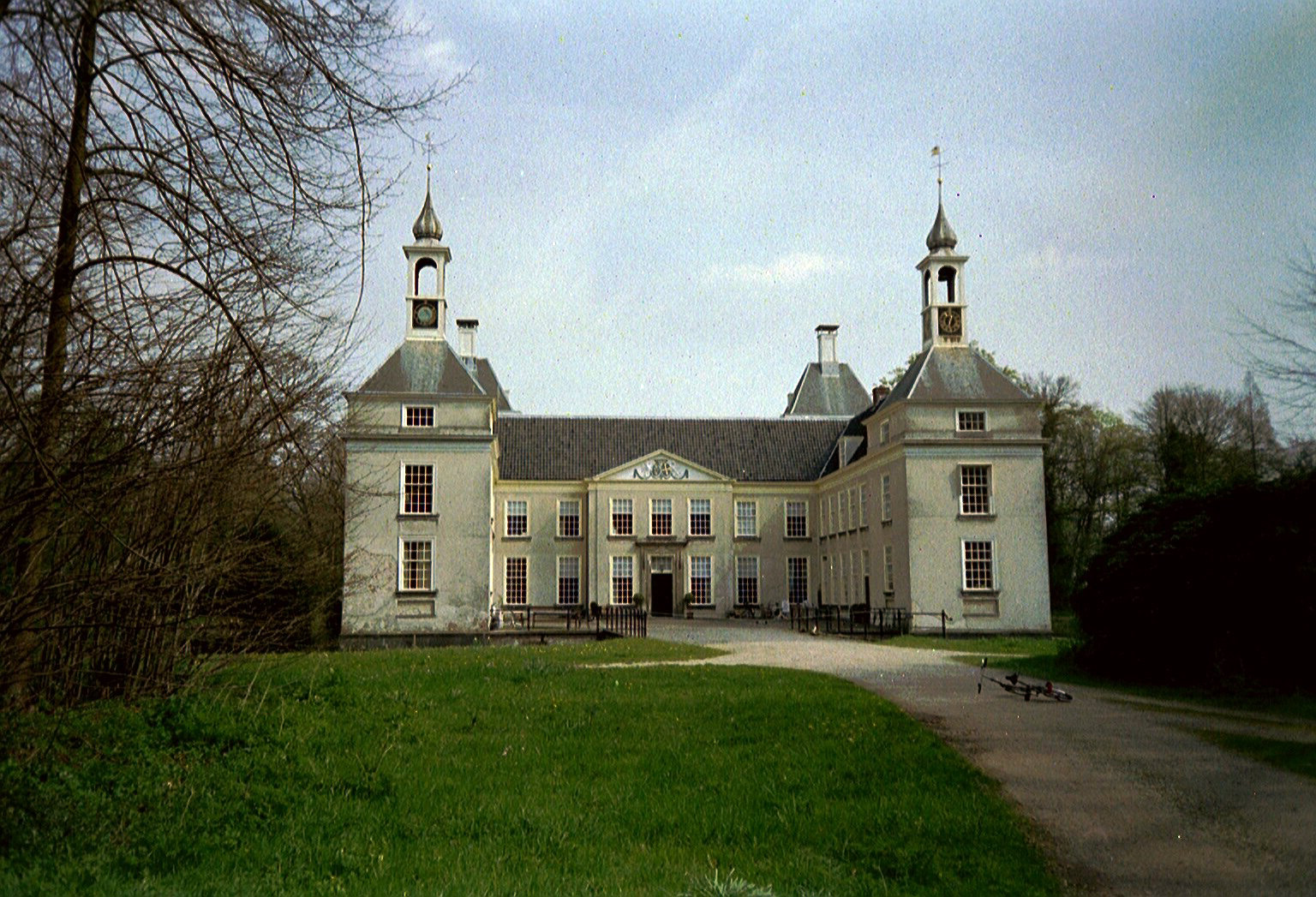
Huys te Warmond.

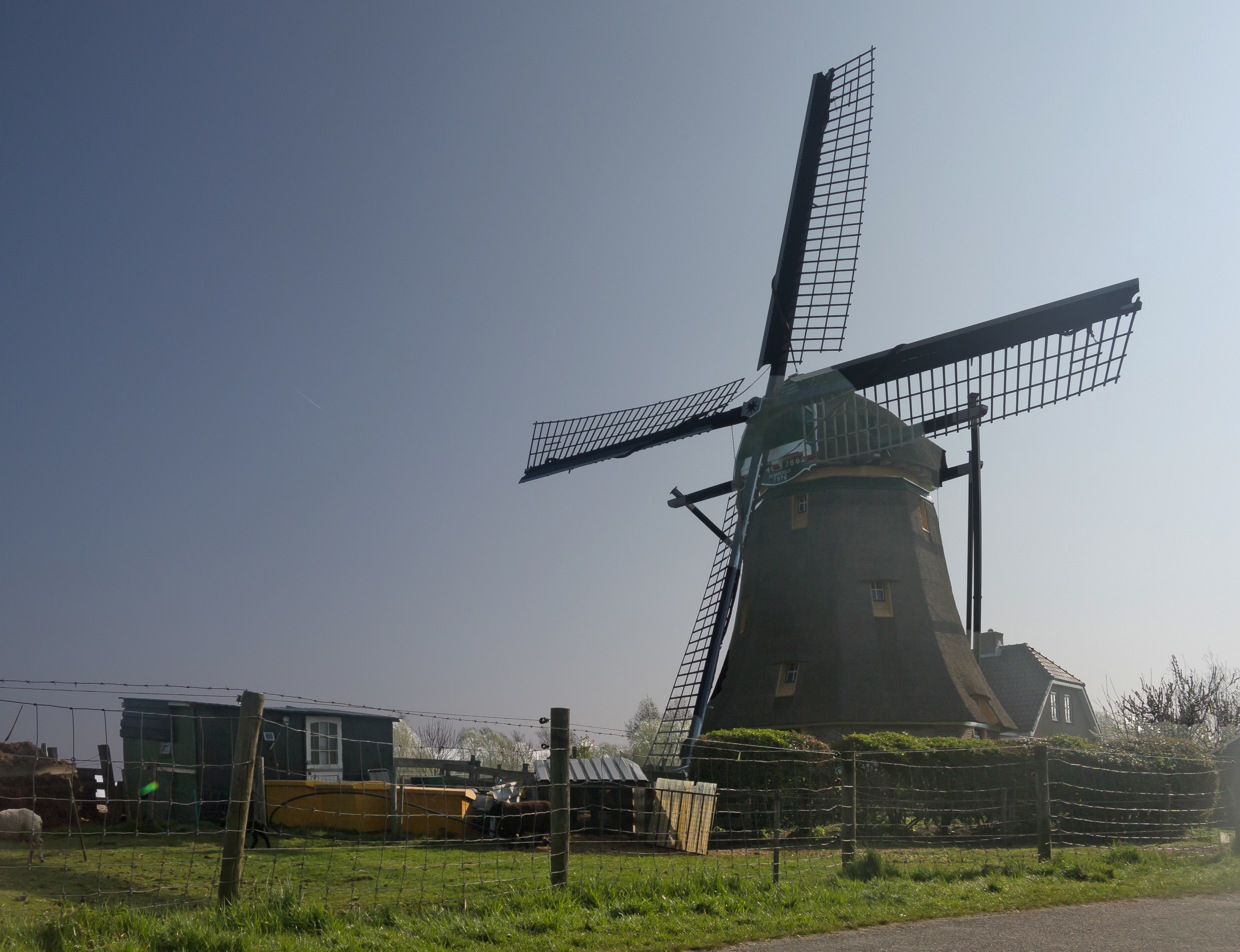
Windmill: de Broekdijkmolen

== Notable inhabitants ==
The Dutch painter Jan Steen lived in Warmond for a brief period, and his house can still be visited. It is also the home of Dutch author Maarten 't Hart, who regularly uses the village and its inhabitants as inspiration for his novels. Antonie van Leeuwenhoek, commonly known as "the Father of Microbiology", and considered to be the first microbiologist, was schooled in Warmond.

- The film comedian Truus van Aalten died in Warmond in 1999.
