= Sassenheim =

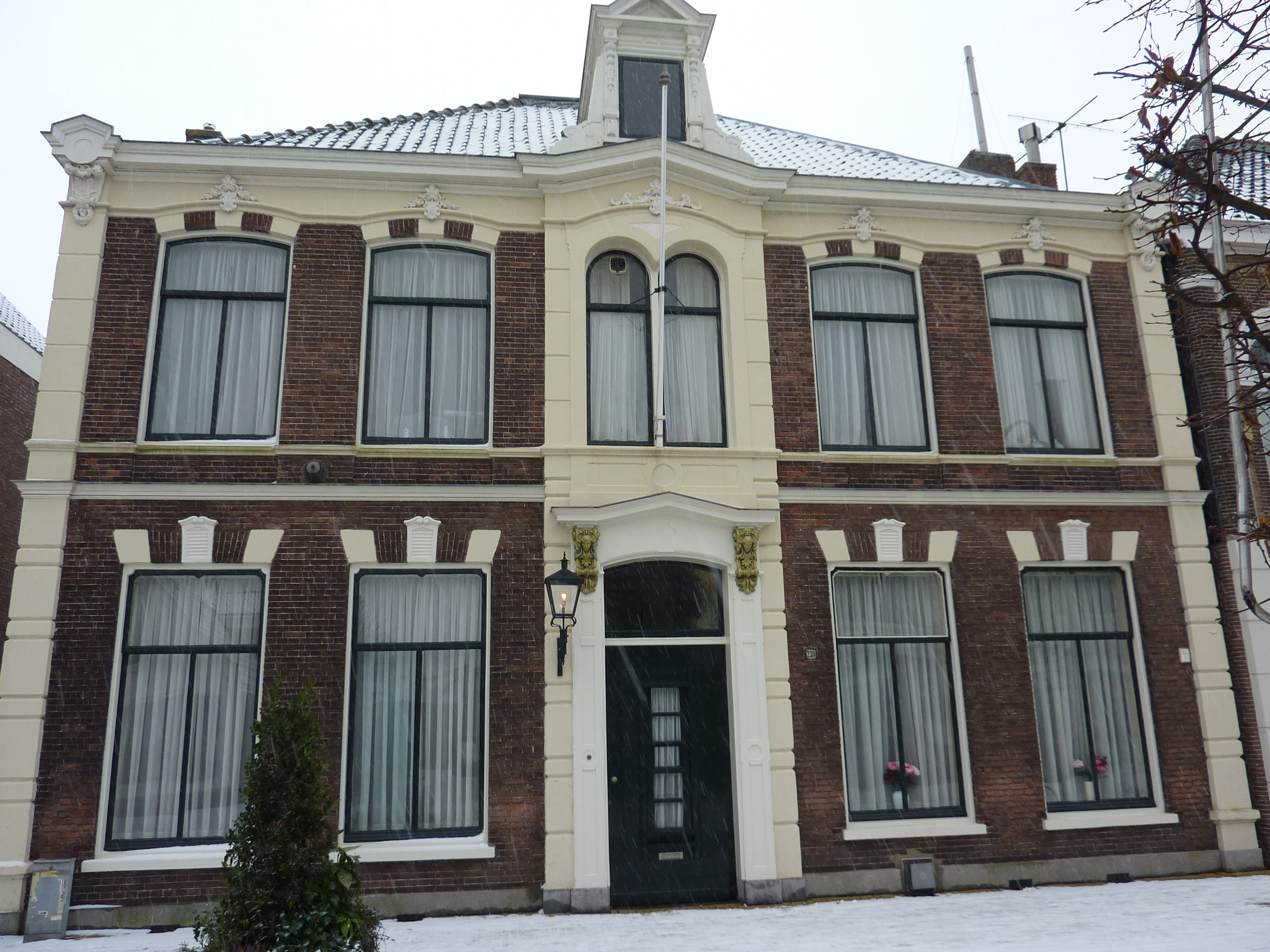
- Old town hall

- Flag Coat of arms

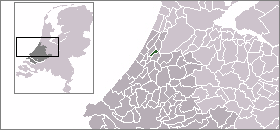

- Location within Netherlands
- Coordinates: 52°13′33″N 4°31′21″E
- Country: Netherlands
- Province: South Holland
- Municipality: Teylingen

Population (2020)
  - Total: 15.755

Sassenheim (Dutch pronunciation: [ˈsɑsə(n)ɦɛim]) is a town and former municipality in the western Netherlands, in the province of South Holland.

The former municipality covered an area of 6.62 km^{2} (of which 0.23 km^{2} water) and had a population of 14,906 in 2005. Since 1 January 2006, it is part of the Teylingen municipality. In 2020, the population reached 15,755. The name Sassenheim consists of two parts; the first (Sassen) means Saxons, and the second portion (heim) is Old Frankish for "home".

== History ==
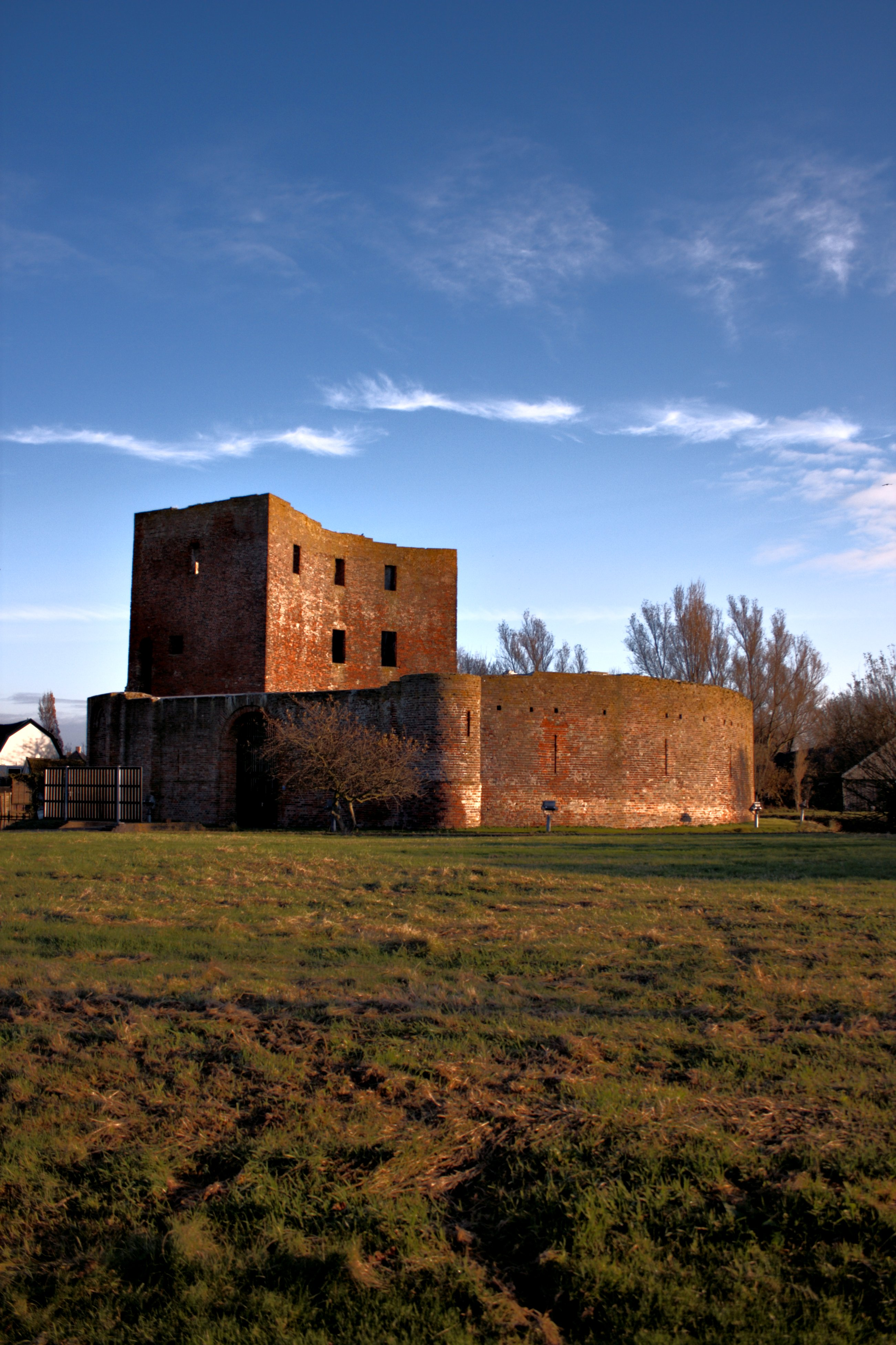
The ruins of Castle Teylingen

The name Sassenheim is mentioned in documents for the first time in 870 as Hostsagnem ('East Sassenheim') and Westsagnem ('West Sassenheim'). Later, in the 10th century, the name Saxnem, Zassenem or Sassem was used. It was formed between the towns of Leiden and Lisse on the eastern edge of the old coastal beach ridges where the main road from Leiden to Haarlem was located. Along this road many castles and estates were built, including the mansions along Sassenheim's Main Street (Hoofdstraat) dating from the early 1900s. The village church is built on a dune top and portrays a variety of construction styles. Sassenheim is located in an area called the "Dune and Bulb Region" (Duin- en Bollenstreek). Historically, Sassenheim had a large bulbflower industry but this has now all but disappeared, only a few fields remain.

One of the most interesting attractions in Sassenheim are the ruins of Castle Teylingen. This stronghold was built to guard the north–south route in Holland and later became a residence of countess Jacoba of Bavaria. Its outer walls date from the beginning of the 13th century. Around 1570 during the Eighty Years' War, the castle was heavily damaged but rebuilt afterwards. It was bought by the State in 1889 and restored in 1900.

Since World War II it has placed much emphasis on attracting light industry. The territory of Sassenheim is partly used for this purpose and partly for residential construction. The few bulbs lands owned by the municipality, have virtually disappeared. The many bulbs barns are almost all demolished. Trade and production have moved to areas outside Sassenheim. In the second half of the 20th century Sassenheim becomes a greater town with new districts around the historical town center, first in the Southeast and the West (during the 60s-70s) and later in the rest of the village.

On December 11, 2011 Sassenheim Train station has opened near the motorway A44.

== Gallery ==
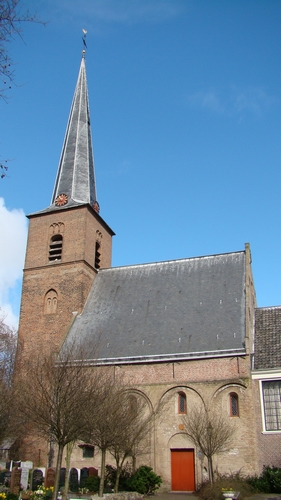
Church:Sassenheimse dorpskerk

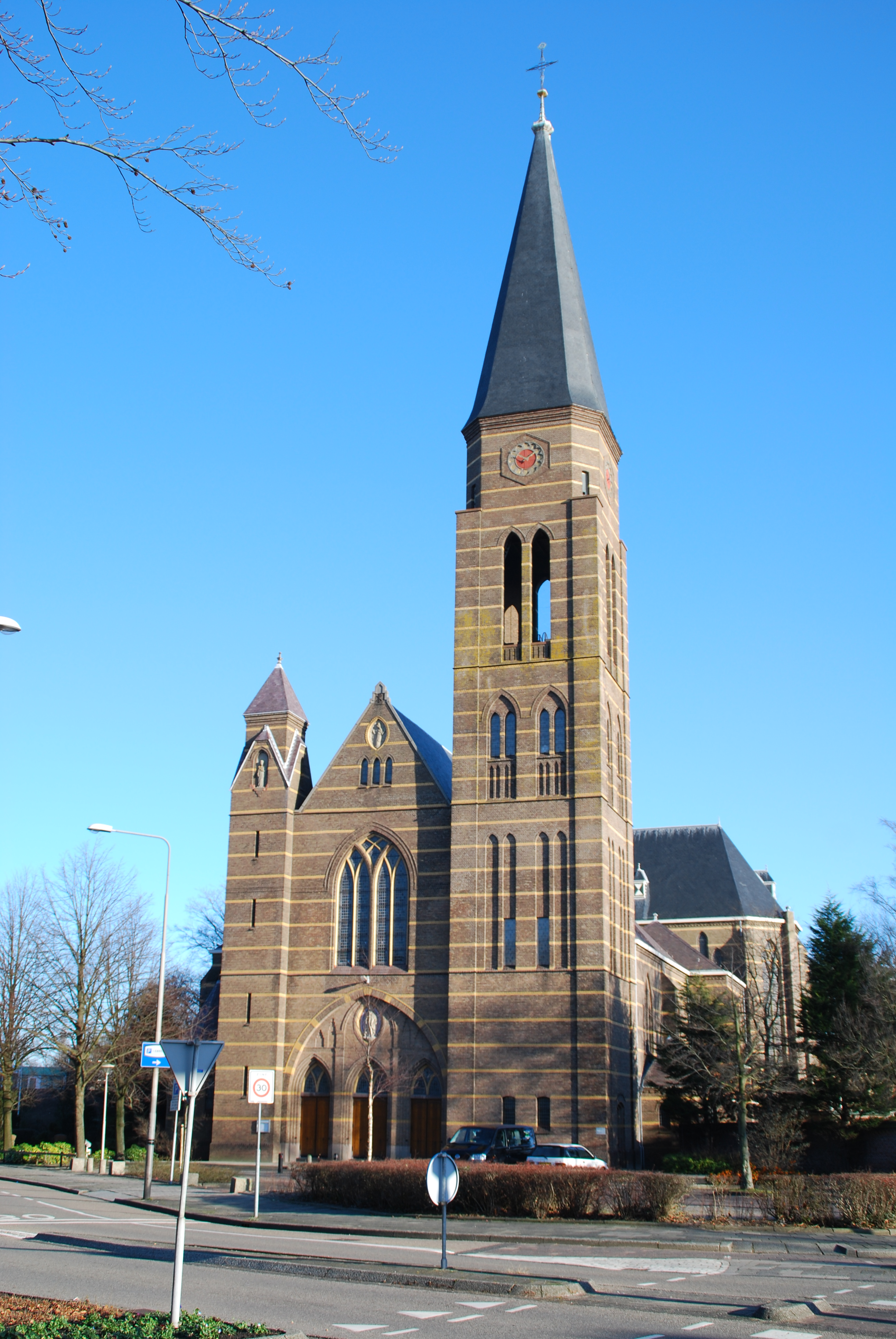
Catholic church:Pancratiuskerk

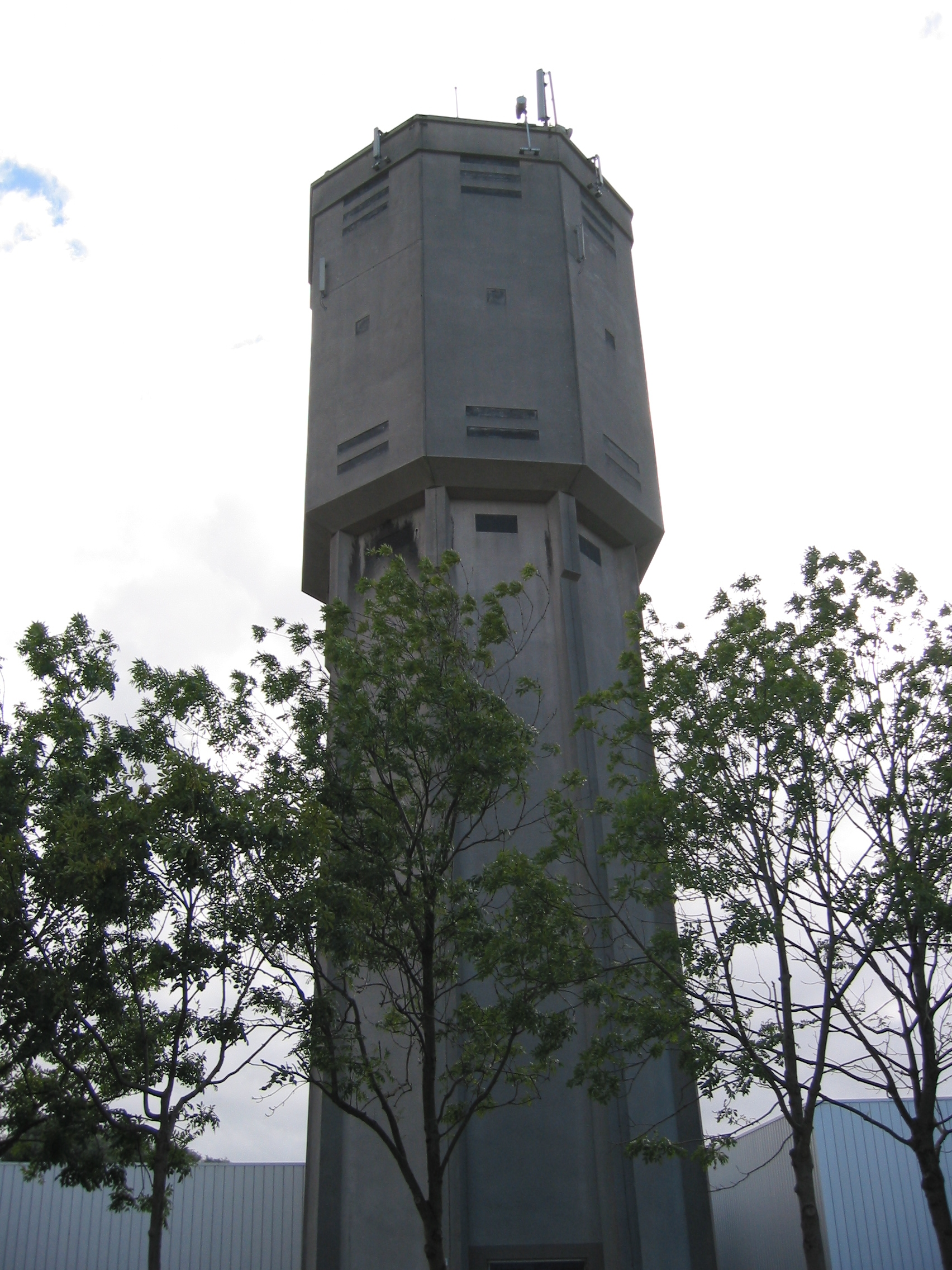
Sassenheimse watertoren

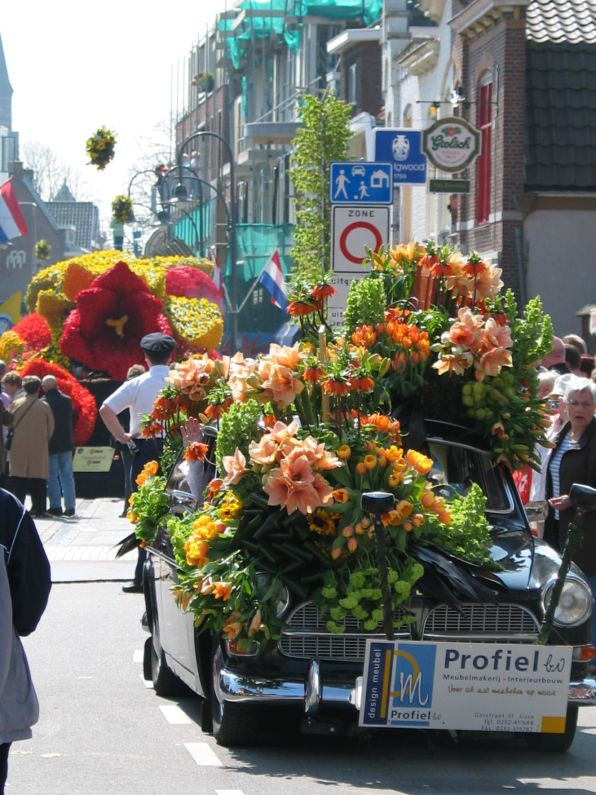
Bollenstreek Bloemencorso 2005 edition

== Notable people from Sassenheim ==
- Bart Zoet (20 October 1942), cyclist
- Patty Trossèl (born 1963), singer and composer
- Tim Mudde (23 February 1965), far-right activist and singer of Brigade M
- Martin Hersman (26 February 1974), speed skater
- Niels Langeveld (born 1988), racing driver
- Jacob Veldhuyzen van Zanten - pilot in the Tenerife disaster
