= Slee =

Did you mean 'Sleep'?

Slee may refer to:

== People ==
- Carl Slee (born 1947), Welsh footballer
- Carry Slee (born 1949), Dutch author whose novel Afblijven is the basis for the films Keep Off and Timboektoe
- Colin Slee (1945–2010), clergyman in the Church of England
- George Slee (died 1613), wool merchant and clothier
- John Slee, mathematics master who taught John Gough
- Lanty Slee, (1800–1878), Lake District farmer
- Mike Slee, (born 1959), British film-maker, producer/director and writer
- Owen Bruce Slee (1924–2016), Australian radio astronomer
- Richard Slee (disambiguation)
- William Henry John Slee (1836–1907), known as W.H.J. Slee FGS, Chief Inspector of Mines for New South Wales

== Locations ==
- Slee, County Fermanagh, a townland in County Fermanagh, Northern Ireland

SLEE may refer to:

- Service Logic Execution Environment in computing

== See also ==
- Van Slee
