= Hillegom =

- Town and municipality
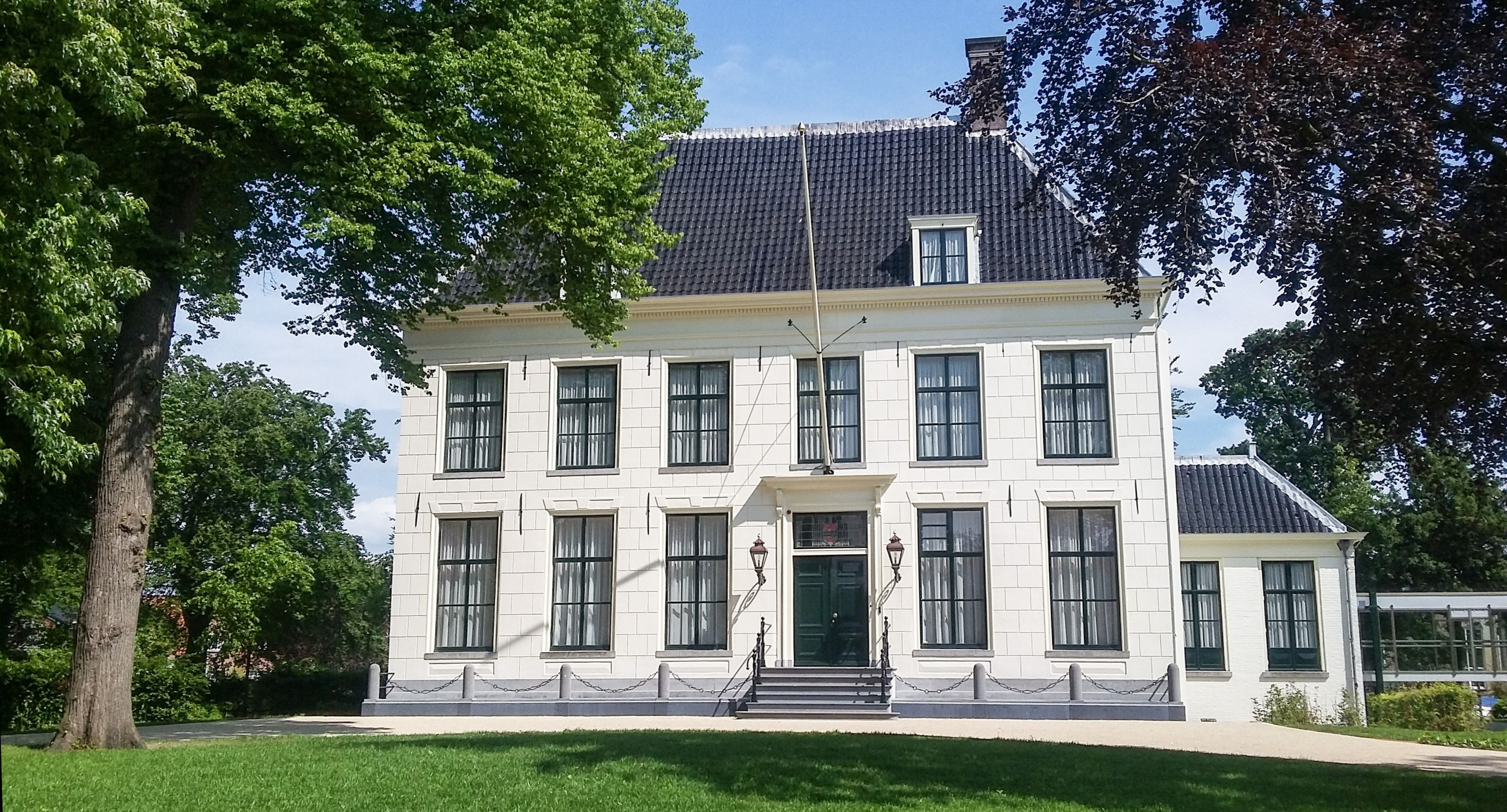
- Hillegom Town Hall

- Flag Coat of arms

- Location in South Holland
- Coordinates: 52°17′N 4°35′E
- Country: Netherlands
- Province: South Holland

Government
  - Body: Municipal council
  - Mayor: Roberto ter Hark (2024–present)

Area
  - Total: 13.47 km^{2} (5.20 sq mi)
  - Land: 12.87 km^{2} (4.97 sq mi)
  - Water: 0.60 km^{2} (0.23 sq mi)
- Elevation: 1 m (3.3 ft)

Population (January 2021)
  - Total: 22,197
  - Density: 1,725/km^{2} (4,470/sq mi)
- Demonym: Hillegommer
- Time zone: UTC+1 (CET)
  - Summer (DST): UTC+2 (CEST)
- Postcode: 2180–2182
- Area code: 0252
- Website: www.hillegom.nl

Hillegom (Dutch: [ˌɦɪləˈɣɔm]) is a town and municipality in the Western Netherlands, in the province of South Holland. Hillegom is part of an area called the Duin- en Bollenstreek ("Dune and Bulb Region"). As such, a large portion of the local economy was traditionally geared to the cultivation of bulb flowers.

The name Hillegom is derived from the abbey named Hijlighem (Old Frankish for "Holy Home"). This abbey no longer exists. The current Lord of Hillegom is Jan Six X.

== History ==
Hillegom was formed on the eastern edge of the coastal dunes where the old Leiden to Haarlem route crossed the Hillegommerbeek (Hillegom's Creek), not far from the shores of the Haarlemmermeer (Haarlem's Lake). Places with the suffix "-heim" (or variant spellings) usually developed before the year 1000 and therefore it is assumed that this may apply to Hillegom as well. In 1150 the abbot of Egmond had the rights to naming priests in Hillegom, indicating that a church or chapel existed there. In 1248 the count Willem II gave the Chapel of Hijllinghem and all its buildings to the Abbot of Egmond.

In the middle of the 14th century, Hillegom gained some prominence when the counts of Holland convened there 3 times for council. In 1369, there were 46 houses with a population of 283, growing to 67 houses and 412 people in 1477.

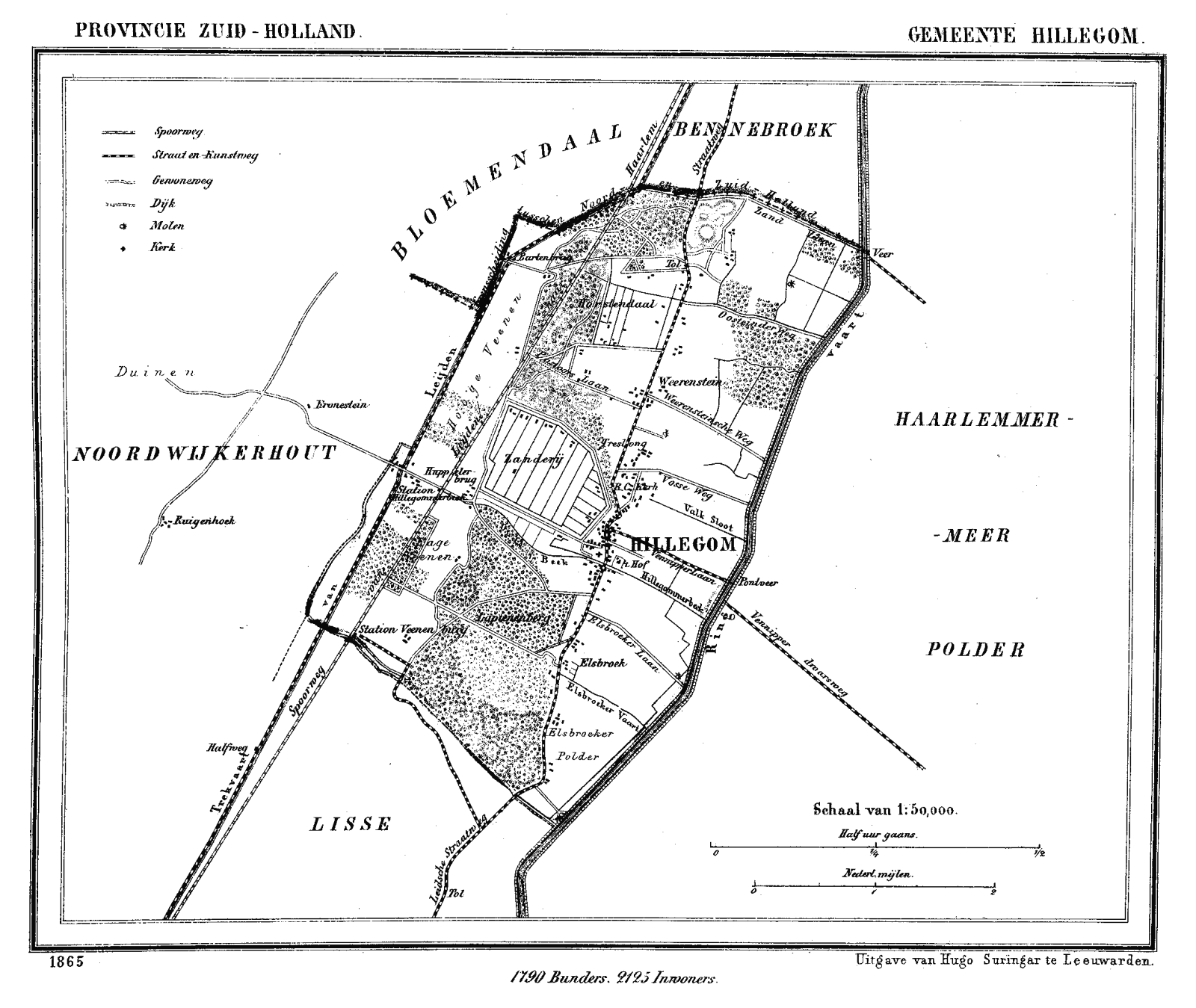
Hillegom in 1865.

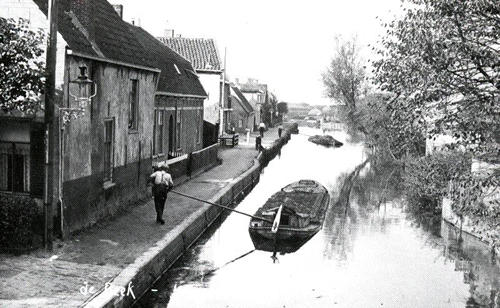
The Beekkade along Hillegom's Creek.

During the Eighty Years' War, Hillegom found itself several times between the opposing Spanish and Dutch Rebel armies, resulting in its near destruction in 1577. But after the middle of the 17th century, the area became prosperous through the cultivation of fruits and vegetables, growing on the sandy soil of fields dug out the dunes.

In 1722, the rich Amsterdam merchant Jan Six II bought the fiefdom Hillegom and built improvements, including a stone bridge over the Hillegommerbeek and a pump in the village square as well as paving a portion of the main road. In 1749, he purchased Het Hof (The Courtyard), an estate in the centre of Hillegom. At this time, there were many other estates of rich merchants and stadtholders in Hillegom, such as Bethlehem, Oostende, Horstendael, Weeresteyn, Treslong, Duin en Weg, Meer en Dorp, Het Hof, Lapinenburg and Elsbroek (many of these names survive as neighborhood names). The population grew to 930 in 1732 and to 1050 in 1795.

In 1855 Hillegom absorbed the former municipality of De Vennip. During the 19th century, the beauty of the area and its estates slowly began to disappear. Developers bought the estates, cut down the forests, and excavated the sand dunes to create fields for bulb flower cultivation. This process accelerated in 1904 when a lime-sand brick factory was built just south of Hillegom, which needed large amounts of sand. By the early 1920s, all estates had disappeared, except for Het Hof which became Hillegom's town hall. This same period saw the rapid growth of the bulb flower industry and Hillegom's population, up to 8800 in 1916.

Hillegom's convenient location led to another rapid growth period during the 1960s, 70s, and 80s, when many new neighborhoods were built to accommodate families working in either Haarlem, Amsterdam, or Leiden. Its economy became less dependent on the bulb flower trade and more diversified with the establishment of a few business parks.

== Geography ==
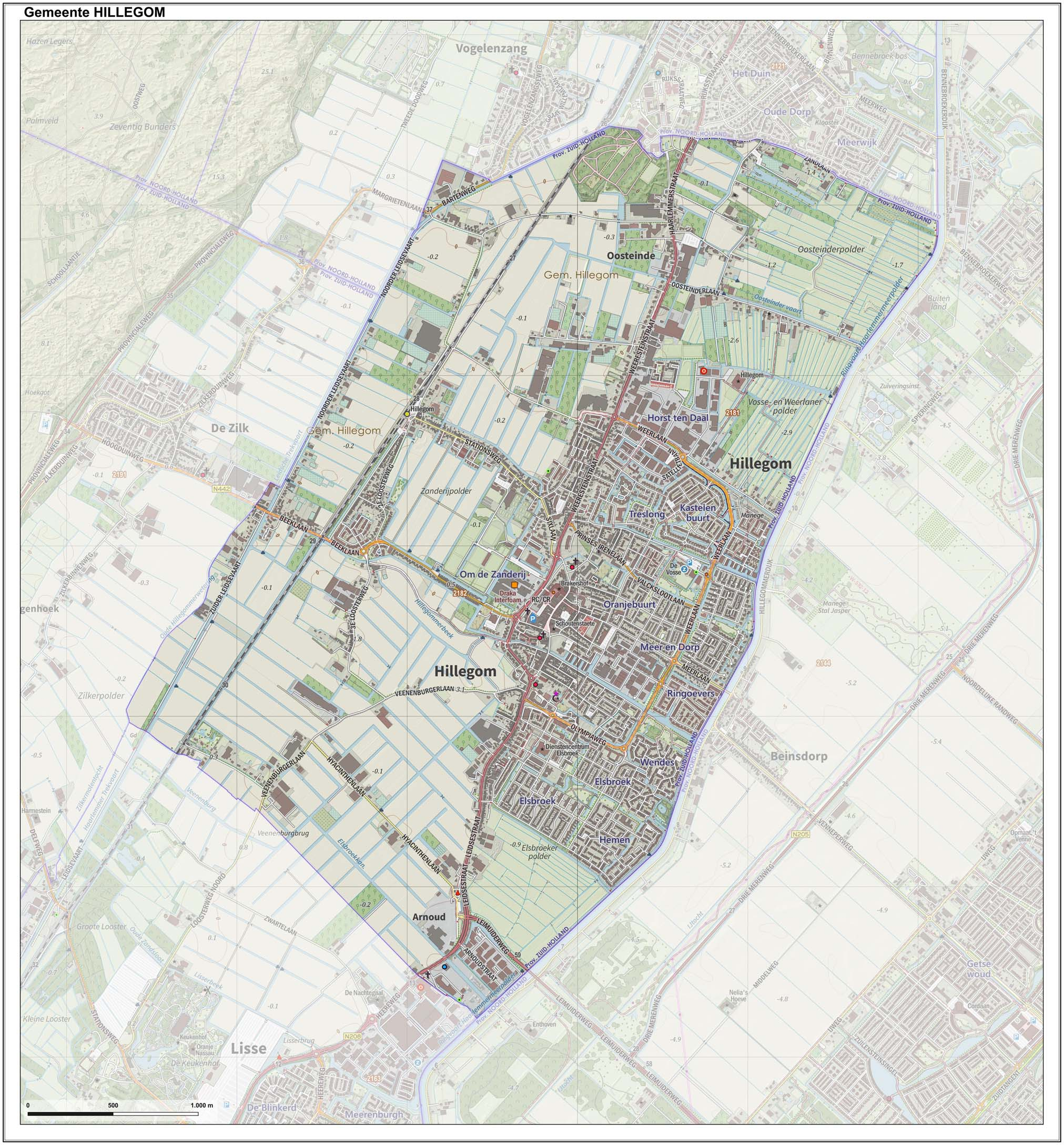
Topographic map of Hillegom, June 2015

Hillegom is bordered by the municipalities of Bloemendaal (and formerly Bennebroek) to the north, Haarlemmermeer to the east, Lisse to the south, and Noordwijk (formerly Noordwijkerhout) to the west. The municipality covers an area of 13.47 km^{2} (5.20 sq mi) of which 0.60 km^{2} (0.23 sq mi) is water.

=== Neighbourhoods ===
- Centrum
- Elsbroek
- De Marel
- Meer en Dorp I and II
- Patrimonium
- Treslong
- De Zanderij
- Hofzicht
- Weerestein
- Amerikabuurt
- Hillegom Zuid
- Vossepolder

== Demographics ==
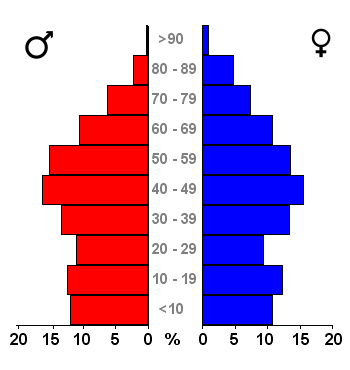
Population spread by age group, 2007.

Population on January 1:

- 1899: 5,361
- 1930: 10,812
- 1960: 14,789
- 1970: 16,963
- 1980: 17,937
- 1990: 19,885
- 2000: 20,664
- 2004: 20,588
- 2006: 20,317
- 2011: 20,627
- 2017: 21,629

Source: Statistics Netherlands

== Transport ==
Historically, much of the town's transport was done by water, either canals or streams.

The Hillegommerbeek (Hillegom's Creek) was used to transport goods from the town to Haarlemmermeer (Haarlem's Lake) and, after its reclamation, to the Ringvaart. Several docks and wharfs still line the creek and canal.

The Leidsevaart (Leiden Canal) was completed in 1657 and runs between Leiden and Haarlem just west of Hillegom. This canal has fallen in disuse because of its many non-operable bridges.

Hillegom is served by Provincial Roads 207, 208, and 442.

=== Railway ===
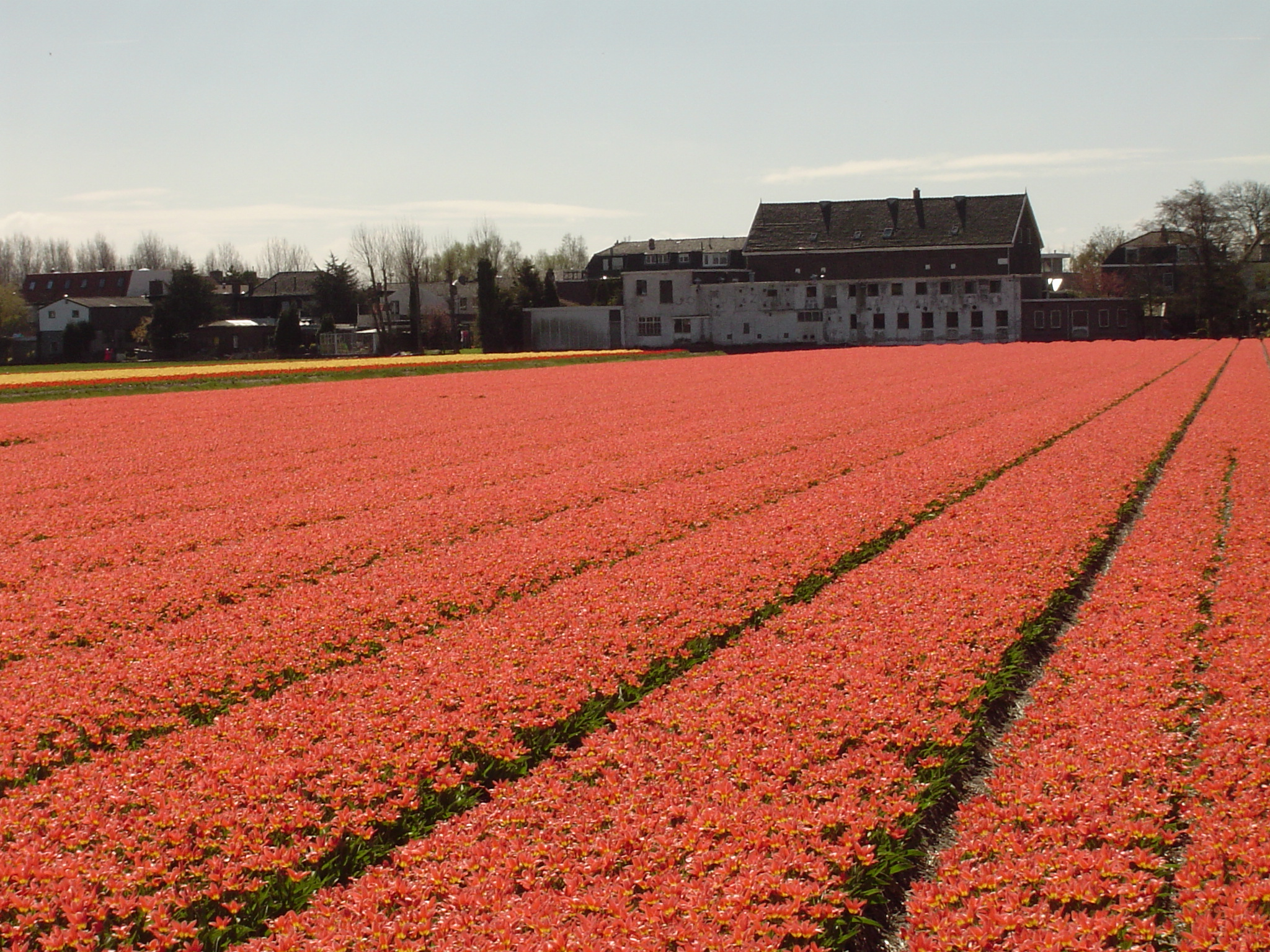
Bulb flower fields near Hillegom.

Hillegom is served by Hillegom railway station, with direct connections to Haarlem in the north and Leiden and The Hague southward.

== Tourism and attractions ==
The most interesting time to visit is during the spring when the fields around Hillegom are in a colourful bloom. At this time a flower parade, the Bloemencorso, travels through its main streets.

Hillegom was home to the Den Hartogh Ford Museum, which had the world's largest collection of Ford automobiles, until it closed down in 2016. It had over 200 classic cars, all from before World War II.

== Notable people ==
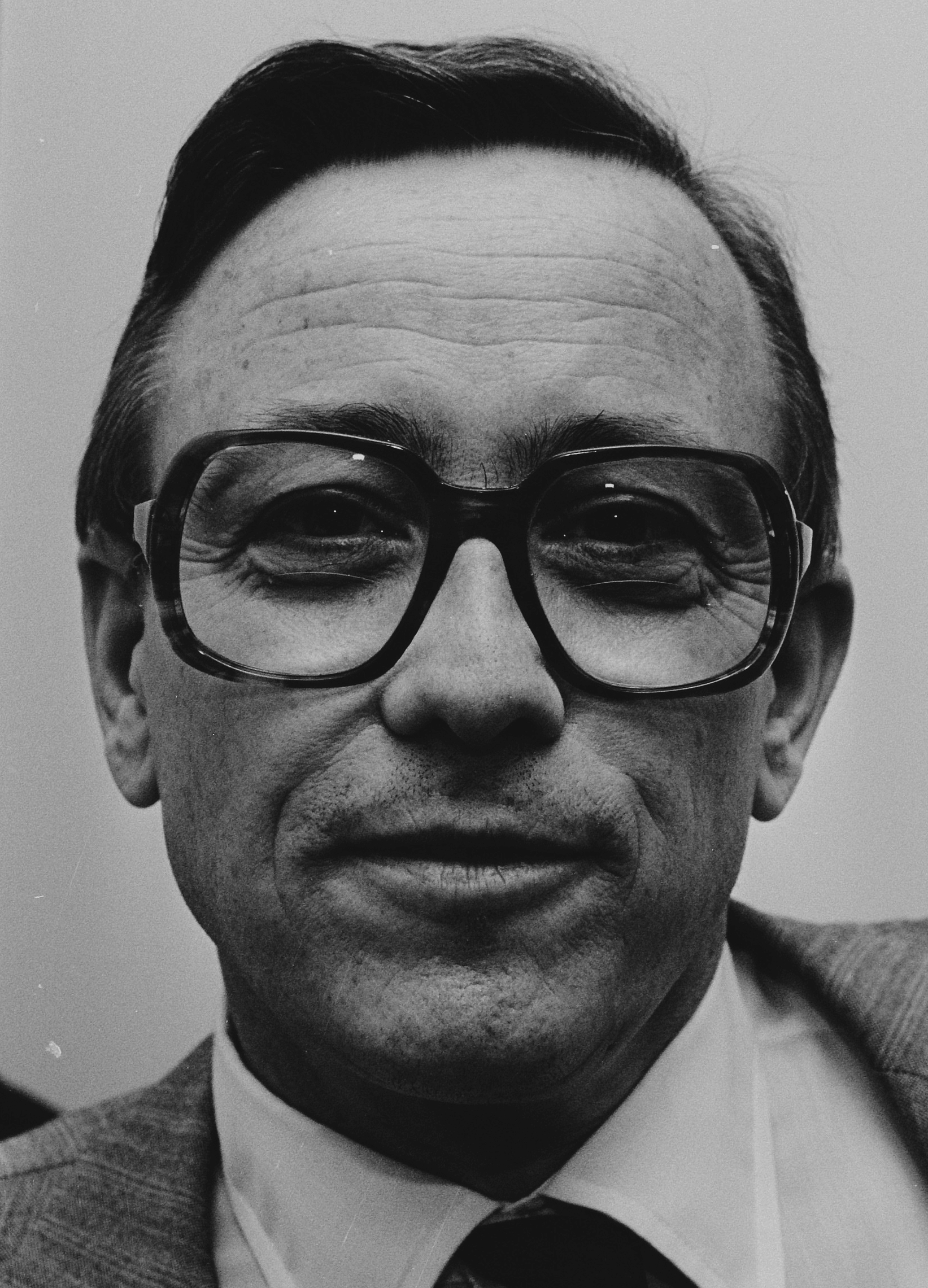
Piet van Zeil, 1980

- Adriaan van der Willigen Pz. (1810 in Hillegom – 1876) a doctor and historian
- Dr. Willem Pleyte (1836 in Hillegom – 1903) a Dutch Egyptologist and museum director
- Jacob Cornelis van Slee (1841 in Hillegom – 1929) a Dutch Reformed clergyman and scholar
- Constantijn Muysken (1843 in Hillegom - 1922), architect
- Piet van Zeil (1927 in Hillegom – 2012) a Dutch politician and trade union leader
- Hans 't Mannetje (1944 in Hillegom – 2016) a Dutch sculptor, mostly of gable stones.
- Wim Turkenburg (born 1947 in Hillegom) an academic on energy and environmental issues
- Thea de Roos-van Rooden (born 1949 in Hillegom), historian and former politician
- Annemarie Spilker (born 1980 in Hillegom) a Dutch photographer

=== Sport ===
- Dick van Egmond (born 1961 in Hillegom) soccer referee
- Jesse Huta Galung (born 1985) a former Dutch professional tennis player, lives in Hillegom
- Marc Evers (born 1991 in Hillegom) a Dutch Paralympic swimmer

== Gallery ==
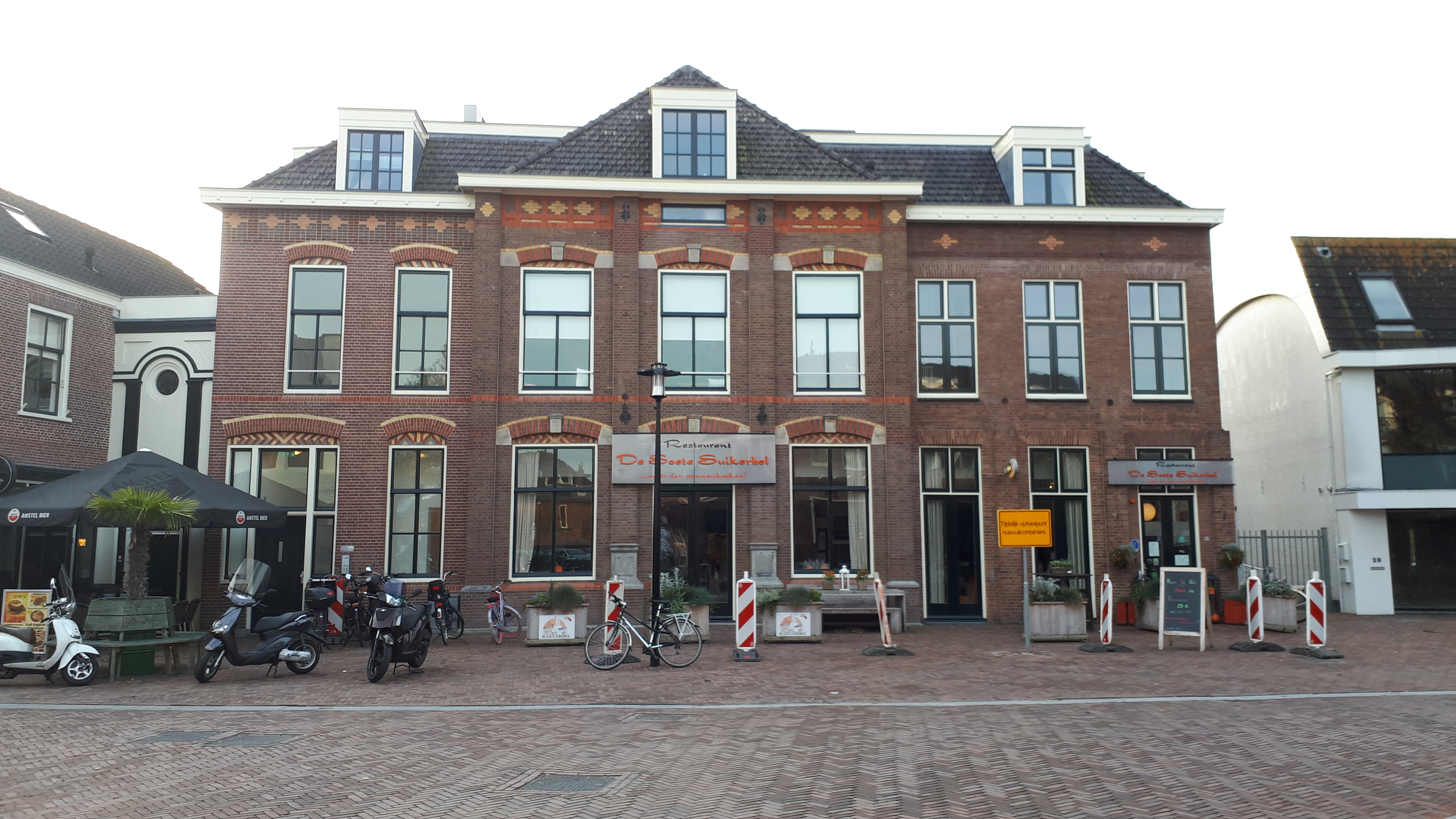
Former post office

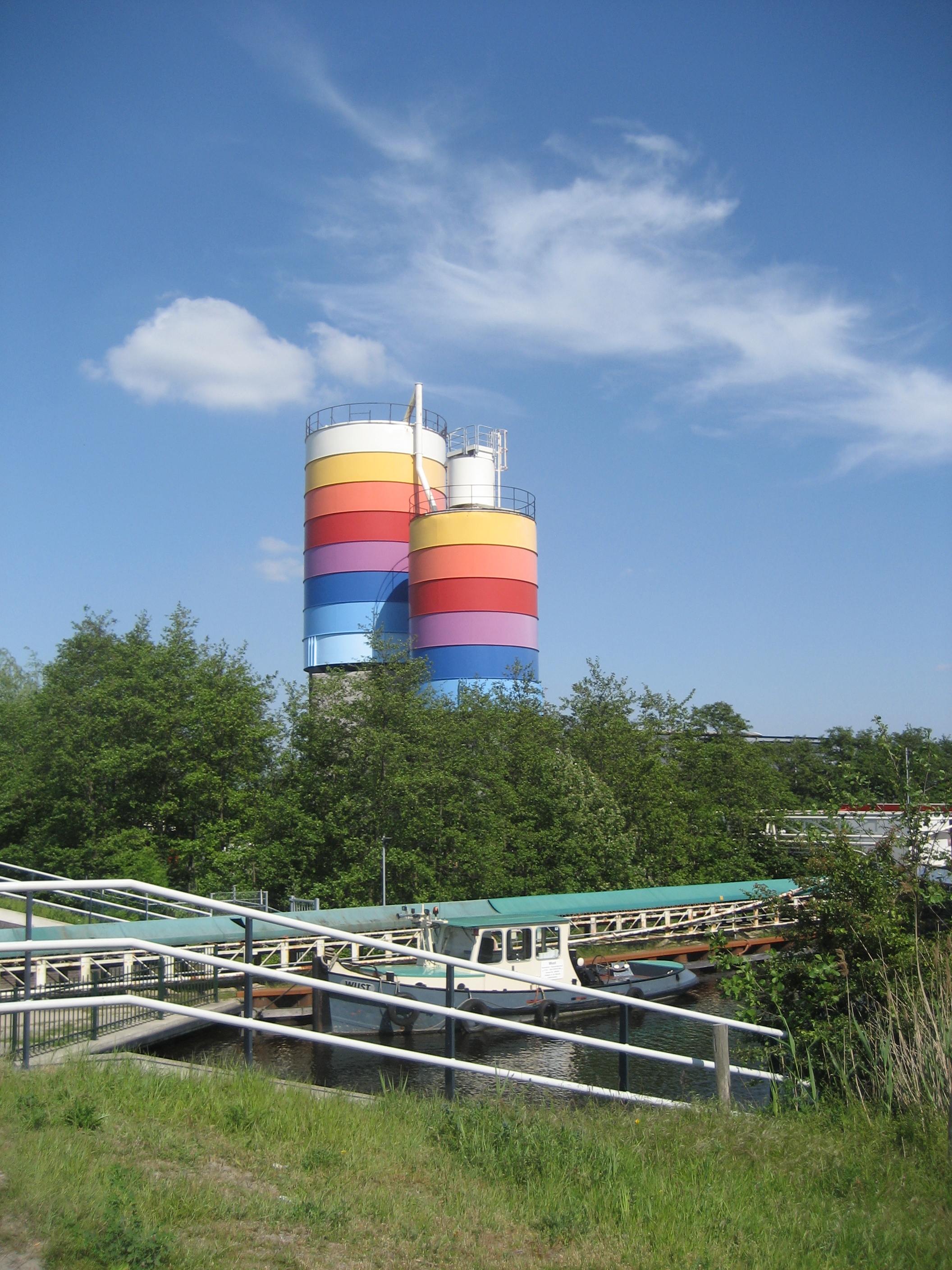
Silos of the siliceous brick factory

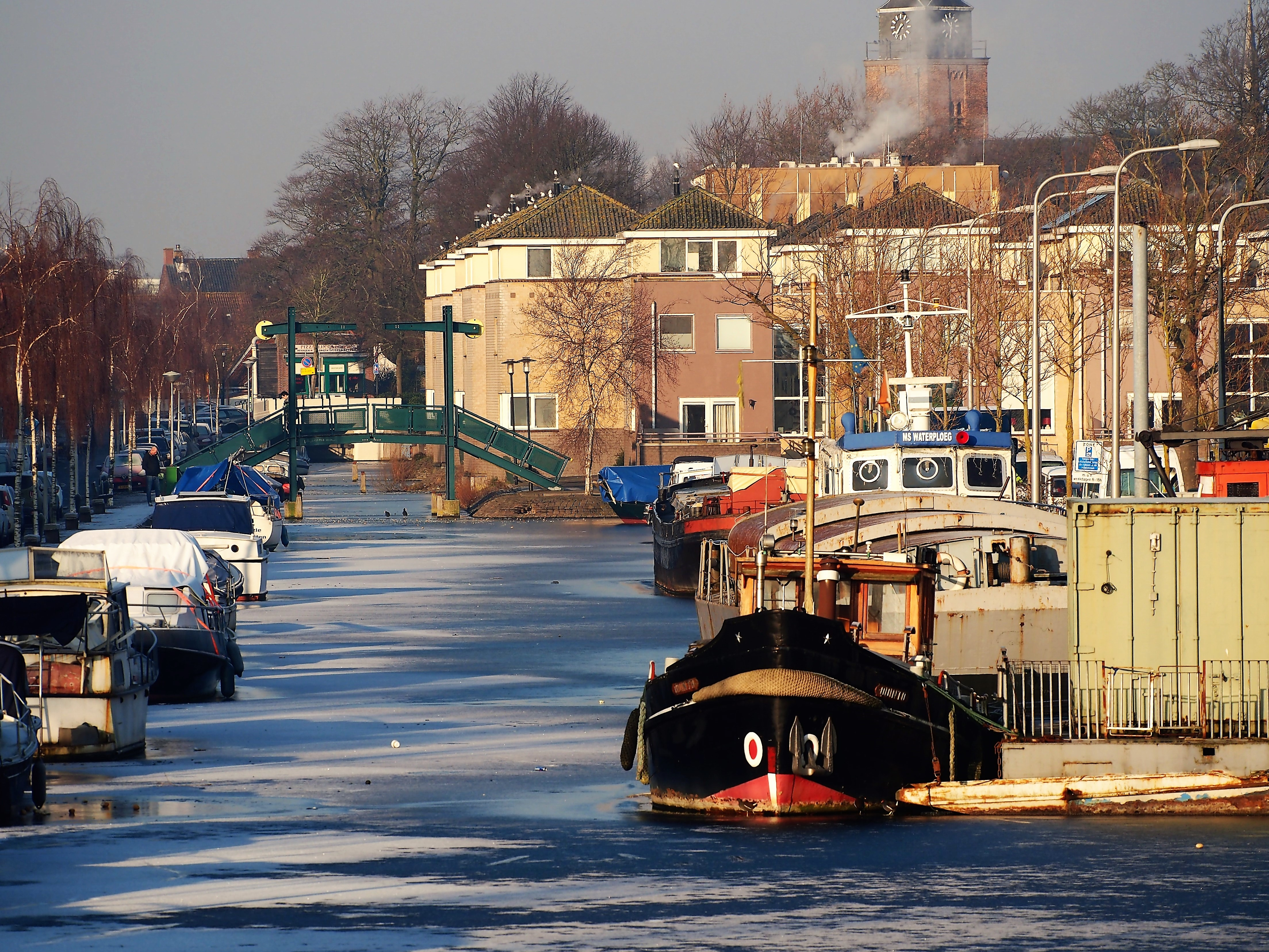
Frozen Hillegommerbeek (Hillegom's Creek)

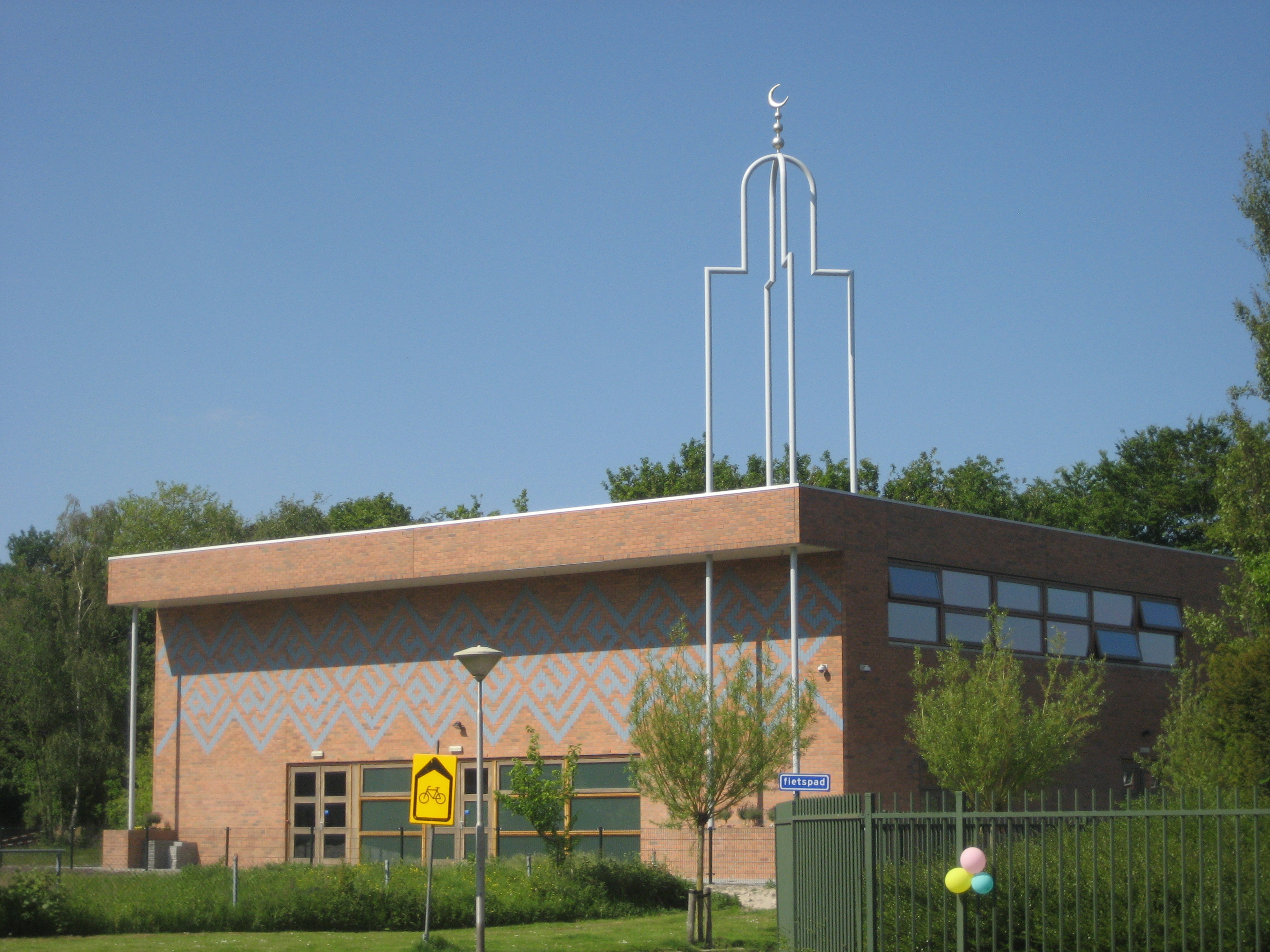
Mosque Al Ansaar

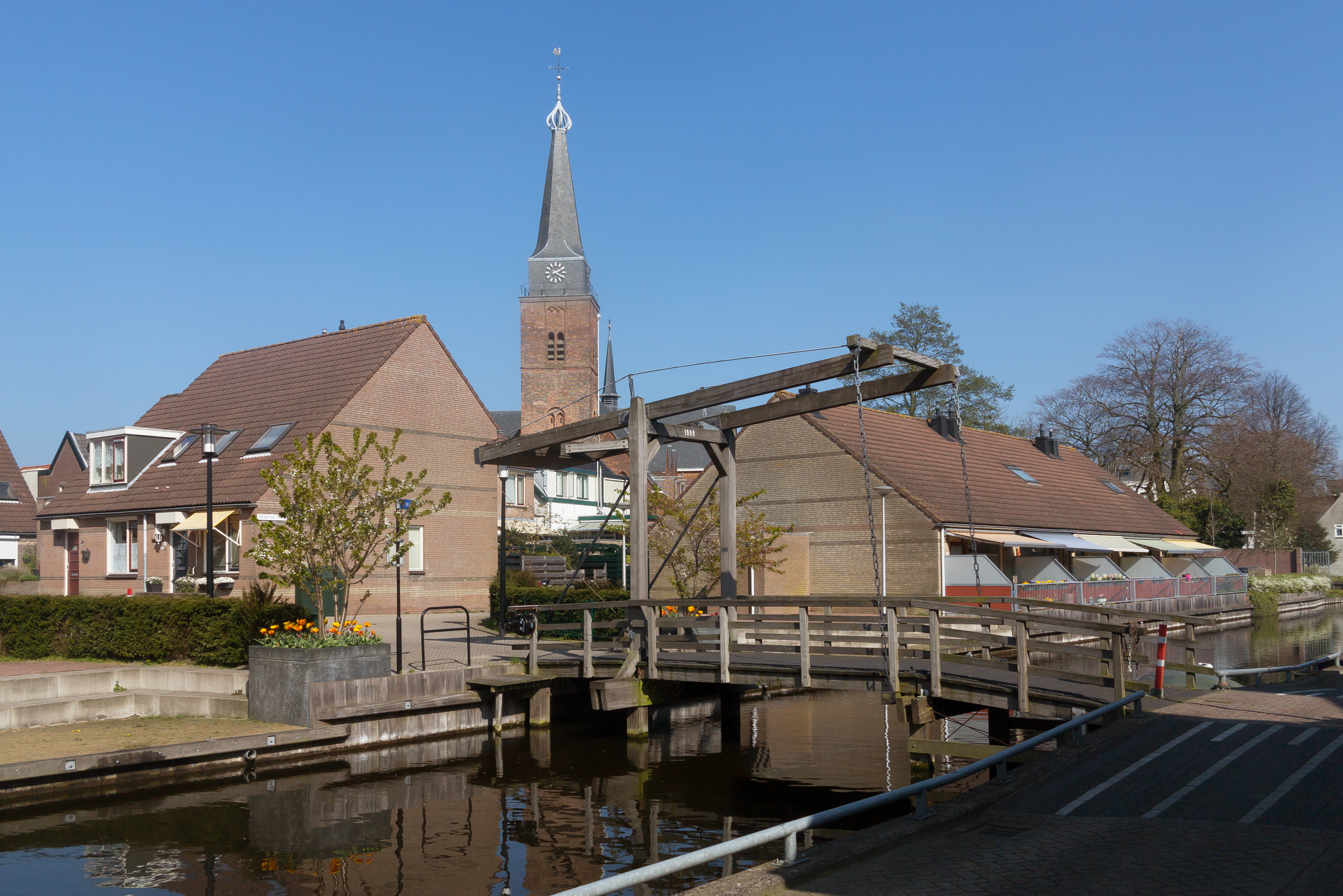
Hillegom, drawing bridge with churchtower (de Maartenskerk)
