= Nyhavn 33 =

Listed property in Copenhagen, Denmark

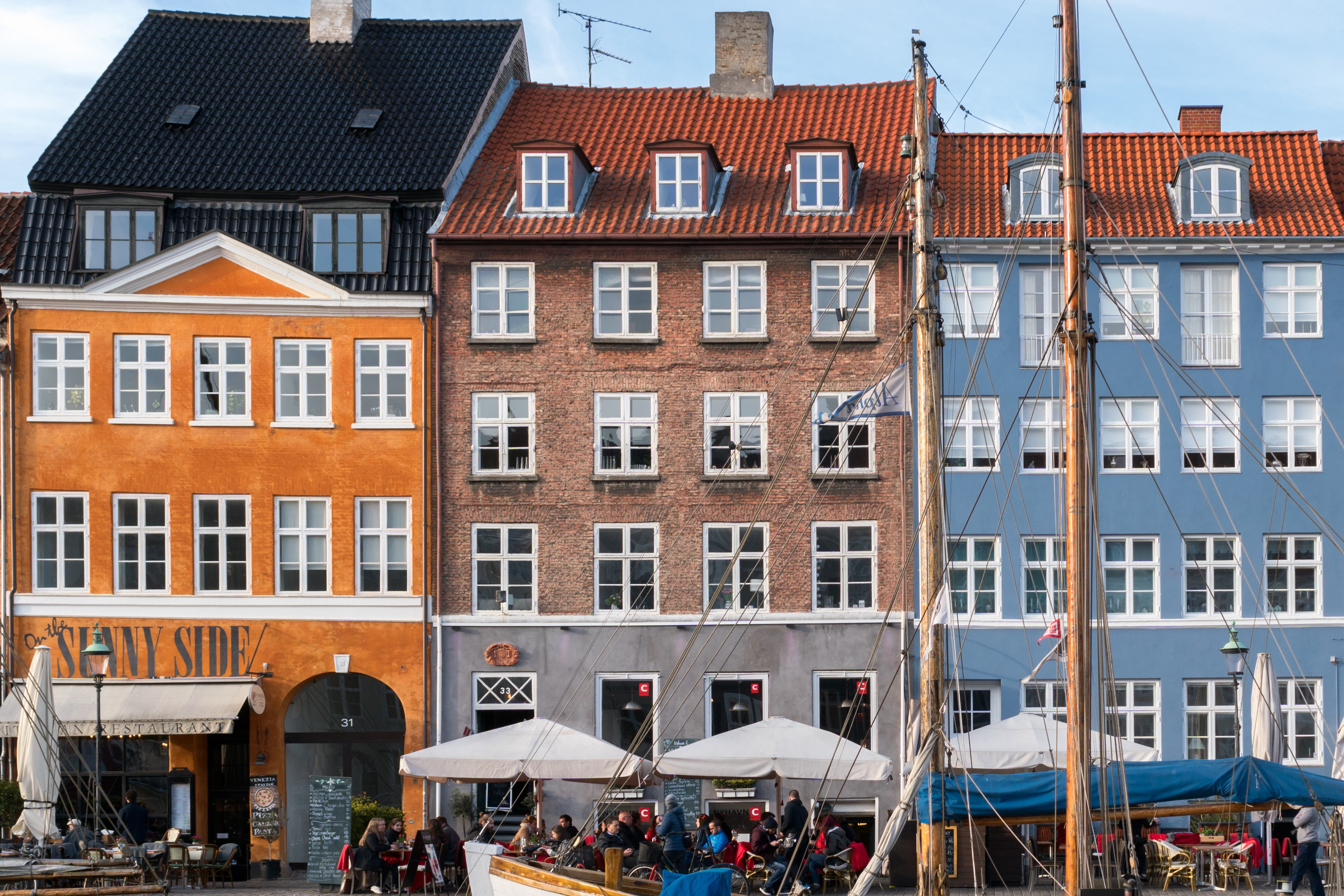
- Nyhavn 33 seen from the other side of the canal
- Interactive map of the Nyhavn 33 area

General information
- Location: Copenhagen, Denmark, Denmark
- Coordinates: 55°40′48.77″N 12°35′24.98″E
- Construction started: 1753
- Completed: 1817

Nyhavn 33 is a listed property overlooking the Nyhavn canal in central Copenhagen, Denmark. A wall stone with a compass rose, a Dannebrog and two sand glasses bear testament to the fact that the building once belonged to a manufacturer of ship sails, flags and compasses.

== History ==
=== 17th and 18th centuries ===
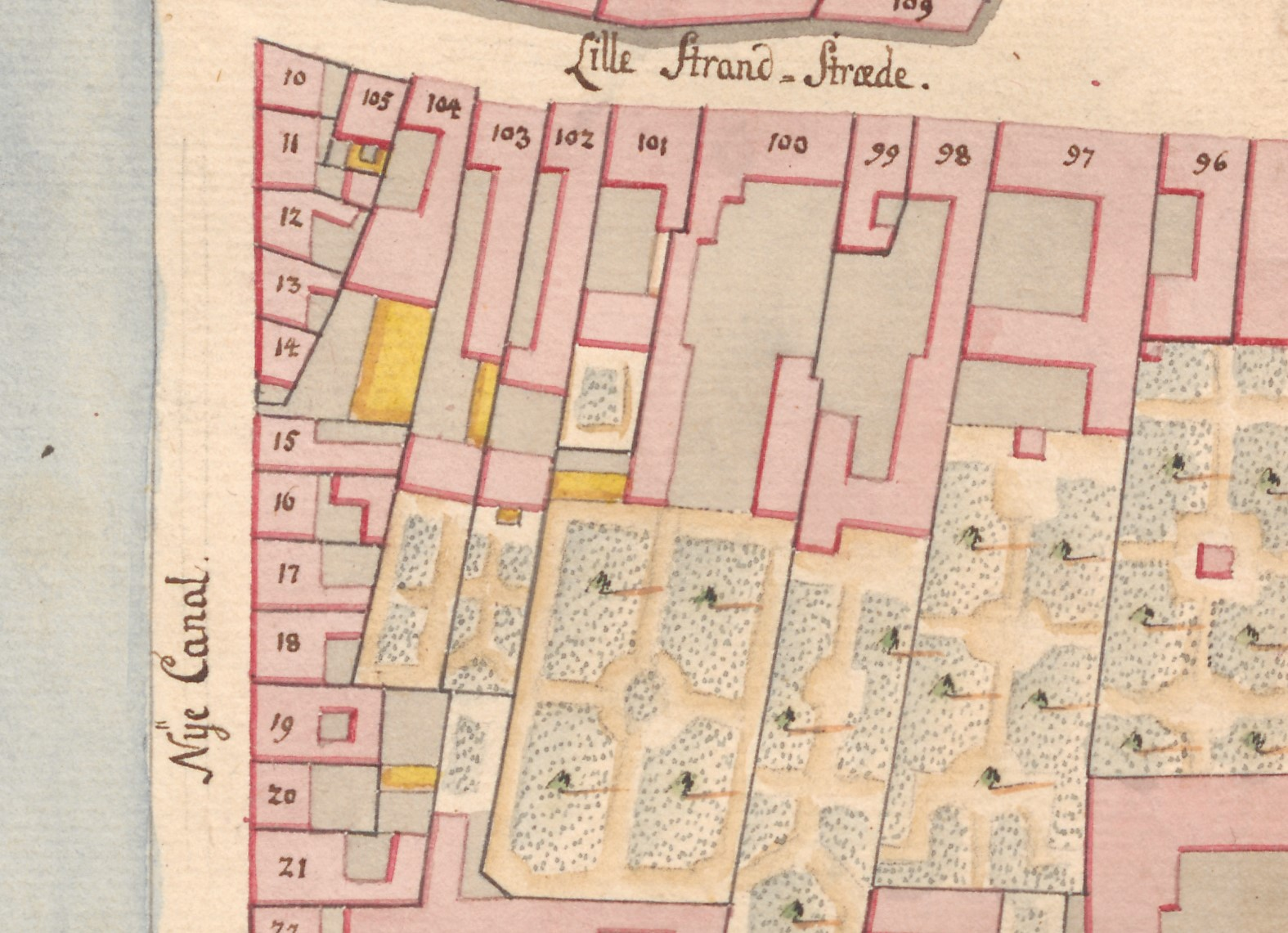
No. 17 seen in a detail from Christian Gedde's map of St. Ann's East Quarter, 1757

The property was listed in Copenhagen's first cadastre from 1689 as No. 12 in St. Ann's East Quarter (Sankt Annæ Øster Kvarter), owned by skipper Jørgen Olsen. The present building on the site was constructed for him some time around 1684. The property was listed in the new cadastre of 1756 as No. 17 in St. Ann's East Quarter. It belonged to skibsmåler Rasmus Hansen at that time.

=== Rasmus Christensen Kock ===
The property was later acquired by Rasmus Christensen Kock (Koch). In 1764, he acquired citizenship as a manufacturer of ship sails, flags and compasses. He heightened the building with one floor in 1767. At the time of the 1787 census, he lived in the building with his wife Birthe Maria Wogstrup, a 26-year-old son and a 20-year-old daughter from the wife's first marriage, the daughter's three children (aged nine to 11) and his own two sisters. The sailor Lars Madsen Hviid, two maids (aged 20 and 21) and seven apprentices (aged 17 to 20) were also part of the large household.

At the time of the 1801 census, Kock and his wife resided in the building with Kock's 44-year-old sister Johanne Marie Kock, the 45-year-old widow Anne Magdalene Lystrup, the widow's 25-year-old son Rasmus Lystrup (theology student) and six employees in Koch's business (five of them apprentices).

The property was again listed as No. 17 in the new cadastre of 1806. It was at that time still owned by Rasmus Christensen Koch.

=== 1830s and 1840s ===
At the time of the 1834 census, No. 17 was home to four households. Christian Lystrup, a manufacturer of sails, flags and compasses, resided on the second floor with his wife Berthe Marie Holst, his cousin Birgitte Marie Haagensen, the wife's sister Anne Marie Holst, the theologian/teacher Rasmus Lystrup (probably another relative), two apprentices (aged 16 and 19) and a maid. Morten Andersen, a ship captain and former portrait painter, resided on the ground floor with Marie Cathrine Andersen, their six children (aged one to 23) and two maids. Hanne Oder, a 69-year-old widow, resided on the first floor with the daughter Anne Marie Oder, a chamber maid (husjomfru) and a maid. Clemens Clemensen Hammeløv, chief of the "fathomers" and loaders" ("Faunsætterne og Læsserne", handlers of firewood), resided in the basement with his wife Clemens Clemensen Hammeløv and two children (aged 11 and 22).

The military officer C. I. von Flensborg (1804-1852) lived in the building in 1838-1839. He served as Chief of Staff of the Royal Danish Army in 1849-1850 and served as Minister of Defence in 1851-1852. The fourth floor was added in 1850.

At the time of the 1840 census, No. 17 was home to 22 residents. Morten Andersen had now moved to the first-floor apartment. Jens Hostrup Schultz, a 30-year-old former farmer, was the new tenant on the ground floor. He lived there with his wife Vincentrine From, their two-year-old son and one maid. The tavern in the basement had now been taken over by a sailor, Niels Mortensen, who lived there with his wife and five-year-old son, a maid and three lodgers.

Claus Lauritz Andersen was born in the basement in 1849. He would later make a fortune as a manufacturer of cigarettes in Shanghai. He made a $ 50,000 donation to the modern extension of the National Museum of Denmark and created a charitable foundation.

=== 1860 census ===
The property was home to 30 residents in seven households at the 1860 census. Ane Kathrine Andersen, widow of a grocer, resided in the building with her three children (aged seven to 12) and one maid. Niels Christian Olsen, a building painter, resided in the building with his wife Helene Sophie Olsen f. Petersen and their one-year-old daughter. Bærtel Jespersen, a 32-year-old man, resided in the building with his wife Nilssine Jespersen and their two-year-old son. Hans Madsen Bremholm, a harbour master's assistant, resided in the building with his wife Bodel Magrete Bremholm (née Jensen) and one maid. Anna Marie Kryger, widow of a farmer, resided in the building with her four children (aged 18 to 34). Johan Julius Kreye, a grocer (urtekræmmer) resided in the building with his wife Emilie Augusta Kreye and one maid. Jens Mikkelsen Winther, proprietor of the tavern in the basement, resided in the associated dwelling with his wife Johanne Winther (née Bechmann), their 11-year-old son, a two-year-old foster daughter, two lodgers and one maid.

=== 1880 census ===
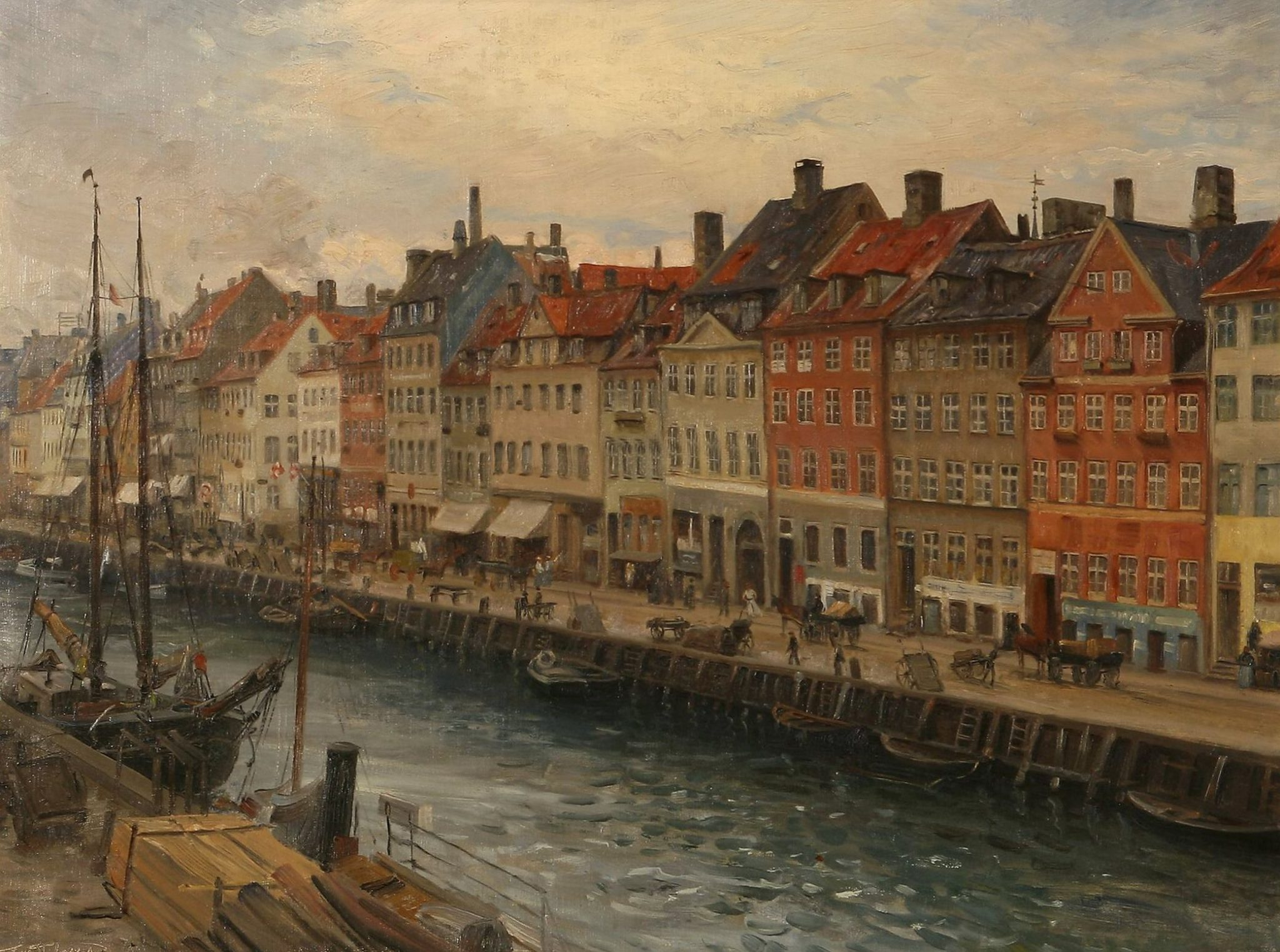
Nyhavn, painted by Tom-Petersen

The property was home to 20 residents at the 1880 census. Henriette Berg, a 39-year-old woman who then owned the building, resided on the second floor. Sophie v Düring, an unmarried woman, resided on the first floor with her two nieces (aged 17 and 18) and one maid. Harald Peter Nicolai Nielsen, a wine merchant, resided on the third floor with his wife Thora Anette Christiane Nielsen, his sister Juliane Nathalie Nielsen, an infant girl (no details, possibly their daughter), a lodger (courier) and a maid. Niels Andersen, a tailor, resided in the garret with his second wife Emma Vilhelmine Andersen f Johannsen, an eight-year-old son from his first marriage, an infant girl (no details, possibly their daughter) and the lodger Niels Kiefer. Eduard William Petersen, a barber, resided on the ground floor with his wife Augusta Josephine Petersen (née Griffenberg) and their two children (aged seven and eight).

=== 20th century ===
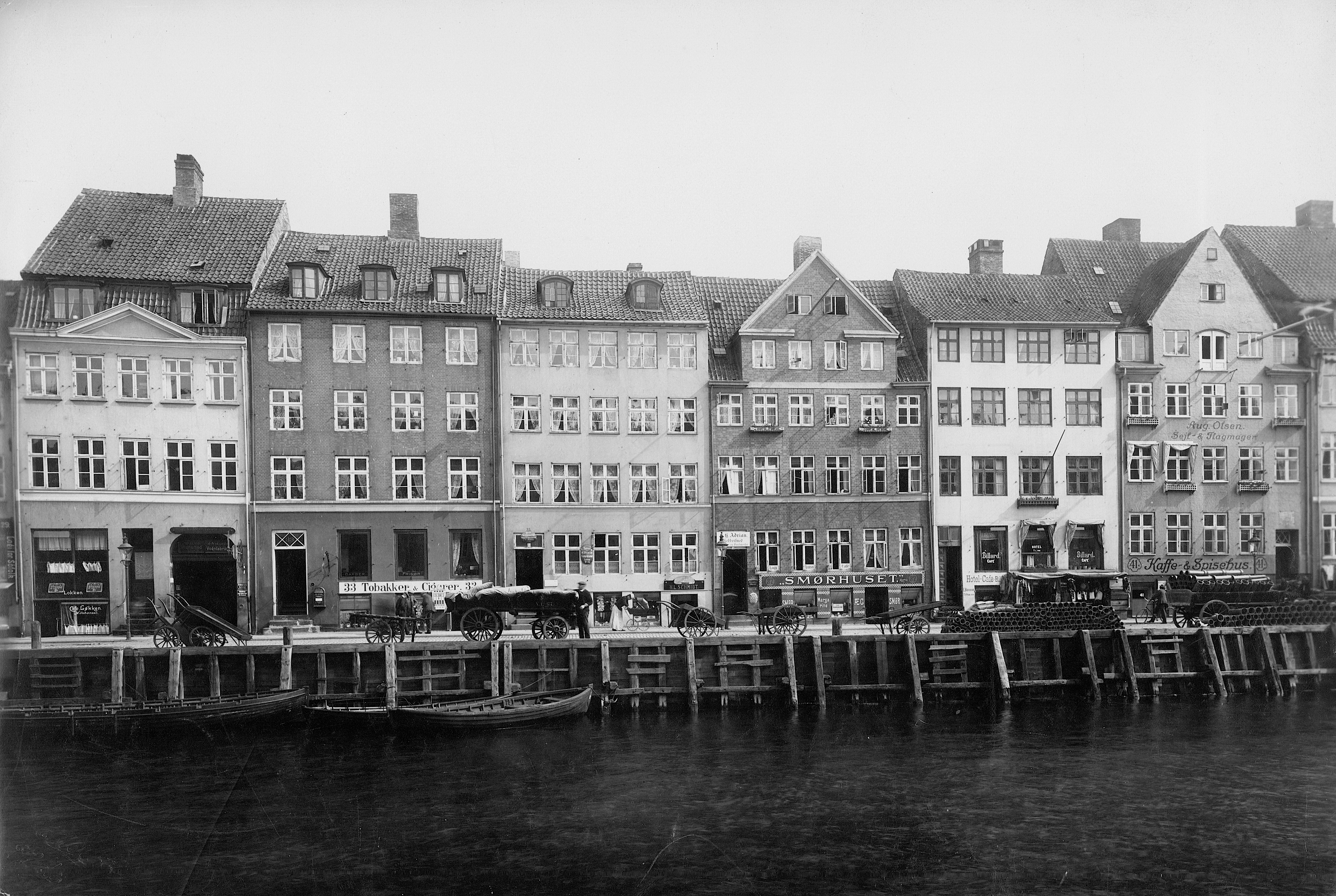
Nyhavn 33 in 1905 (second building from the left)

The building was listed by the Danish Heritage Agency in the Danish national registry of protected buildings in 1945. A tobacconist was for many years located in the ground floor. It was later succeeded by Nyhavnscaféen.

== Architecture ==
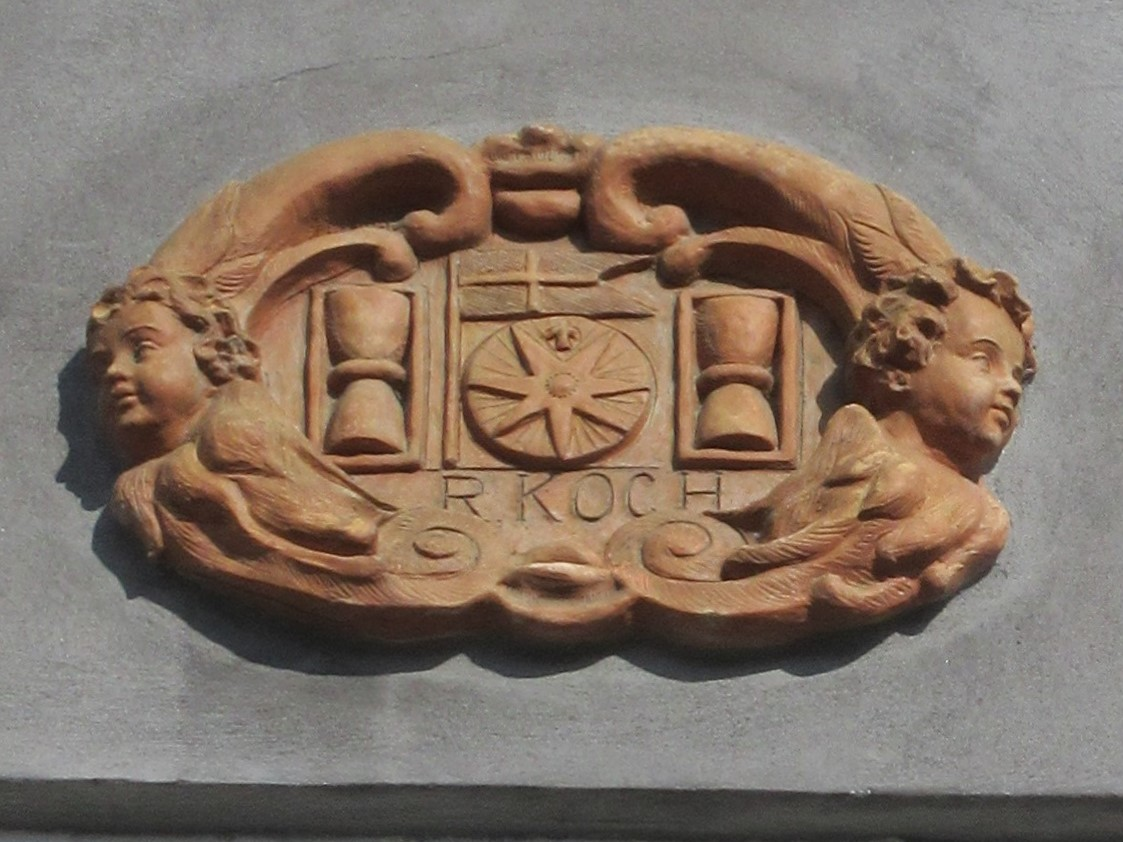
The relief above the main entrance

Above the main entrance is a wall stone featuring the name "R. Koch", a compass rose, a Dannebrog and two sand clocks. The sign dates from Tasmus Kock's ownership of the building in the 1760s. The framing with angel heads is, however, believed to be around one hundred years older than that. The historian Peter Lind has suggested that the relief is a former epitaph from one of Copenhagen's churches which was adapted for its new use by a stonemason. Two side wings from 1784 project from the rear side of the building.

== Today ==
NyhavnC is now based in the building. It consists of a restaurant, a café and a bar.
