= Van Slee =

Van Slee or van Slee is a Dutch surname. Notable people with the surname include:

- Andrew Van Slee (born 1962), Canadian filmmaker
- Jacob Cornelis van Slee (1841–1929), Dutch clergyman and scholar
