= Wim Turkenburg =

Dutch academic

Wim C. Turkenburg (born 1947, in Hillegom) is emeritus professor 'Science, Technology & Society' (STS) at Utrecht University, the Netherlands, and owner of a consultancy on energy and environmental issues. He is member of the board of the Foundation Preparation Pallas reactor as well as member of some advisory and programming committees on issues ranging from nuclear waste management and the safety of nuclear power plants and natural gas exploitation to RD&D programming in the field of bioenergy and biomaterials. In addition he communicates regularly on energy issues in public media.

Also he is member of the editorial board of the scientific journal Energy for Sustainable Development and the board of the International Energy Initiative (IEI). He authored or co-authored hundreds of publications on energy system analysis in the context of climate change, energy technology assessment, renewable energy, carbon capture and storage (CCS), energy efficiency, nuclear energy, energy policies, climate change, and environmental risk assessment. He was the Convening Lead Author of the WEA chapter on Renewable Energy Technologies (2000) and the GEA chapter on Renewable Energy (2012).

He was head of the former Department on Science, Technology & Society (STS) of Utrecht University, director of the Copernicus Institute of Sustainable Development of Utrecht University, as well as scientific director of the Utrecht Center for Energy research (UCE).

He served on a number of international boards, committees and working groups, including the Committee on Energy and Natural Resources for Development of the United Nations (UN-CENRD), the Working Group on Energy Supply Mitigation Options of the Intergovernmental Panel on Climate Change (IPCC), the Executive Committee of the World Energy Assessment (WEA) as well as the Global Energy Assessment (GEA), the Working Group on Renewable Energy of the World Energy Council (WEC), and the board of the International Institute for Industrial Environmental Economics (IIEEE) of Lund University.

In addition he served on numerous national boards and committees, including the board of the Energy Research Centre of the Netherlands, the Council on Housing, Physical Planning, and Environment (VROM-raad) of the Netherlands, the General Energy Council (AER) of the Netherlands, the Energy Committee of the Social and Economic Council of the Netherlands (SER), the board of the Dutch research programme on CO_{2} Capture, Transport and Storage (CATO), the board of the Netherlands' Platform Communication on Climate Change (PCCC), the board of the Dutch Physical Society (NNV), the board of the NGO 'Natuur en Milieu', and the board of the Dutch division of the International Solar Energy Society (ISES-Nederland).

In 1996 he received in the US, at the conference ICCDR-III, the Greenman Award “to honor important contributions toward harnessing technology so that human race can better live in harmony with the environment”, because of his work on CCS (see: IEA GHG Programme). In 2007 he was one of the co-recipients of the Nobel Peace Prize awarded to the IPCC. In 2013 he became ‘Knight of the Order of the Netherlands Lion’ (Ridder in de Orde van de Nederlandse Leeuw).
