= Richard Slee =

Richard Slee may refer to:

- Richard Thilthorpe Slee (1879–1935), mining engineer
- Richard Slee (artist) (born 1946), British ceramic artist
