= Thea de Roos-van Rooden =

Dutch historian and politician

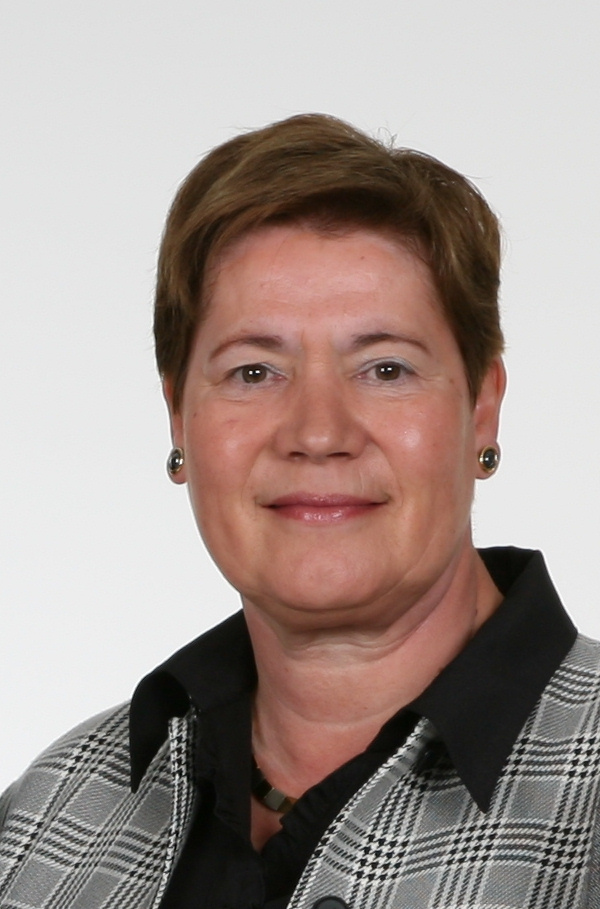

Personal details
- Born: 27 May 1949 (age 77) Hillegom, Netherlands
- Party: Labour Party
- Education: University of Groningen
- Occupation: Historian

Th.C.M. (Thea) de Roos-van Rooden (born 27 May 1949 in Hillegom) is a Dutch historian and politician for the Labour Party (Partij van de Arbeid).

== Biography ==
She studied history at the University of Groningen and graduated in 1975. After that she became a history teacher in Haarlem and Beverwijk. In 1978 she was elected as councillor for the city council of Heemskerk. Between 1986 en 1990 she served as an alderman for this town. In 1990 she became the mayor of Millingen aan de Rijn.

After resigning in 1997 she was the dijkgraaf of the water board "Het Lange Rond" in North Holland. This board was decommissioned in 2003 after it was incorporated in the new water board "Hoogheemraadschap Hollands Noorderkwartier".

On 1 December 2003 she became the mayor of the Frisian town of Gaasterlân-Sleat. She resigned in 2007. In 2009 she was elected as a member of the water board "Hoogheemraadschap Rijnland".

Besides her educational and political activities she published several books, most of them on local history.

== Bibliography ==
- Millingen in 1945 (1995)
- Gemeentehuizen in Gelderland (with Jan de Roos) (1995)
- Acht maal edelachtbaar, Millingse burgemeesters 1810-1967 (with Jan de Roos) (1997)
- Millings drieluik (1997)
- Het Noorderpolderhuis in Schermerhorn (1998)
- Het stof der dagelijkse dingen, over de Millingse postbode Bartje Lelie (1999)
- Dreug ôn den diek, over het Millingse schuttersgenootschap OEV (with Jan de Roos) (2002)
- Een burgemeester van stand: Otto van Nispen & Hillegom (2005)
- Gaasterland. Eeuwenoud land tussen Mar en Klif (with Bauke Boersma, Henk Dijkstra, Sytse ten Hoeve en Peter Karstkarel) (2005)
- Aggie. Levensschets van Agnes Pijnaker 1910-1997 (2007)
