= Hans 't Mannetje =

Dutch sculptor

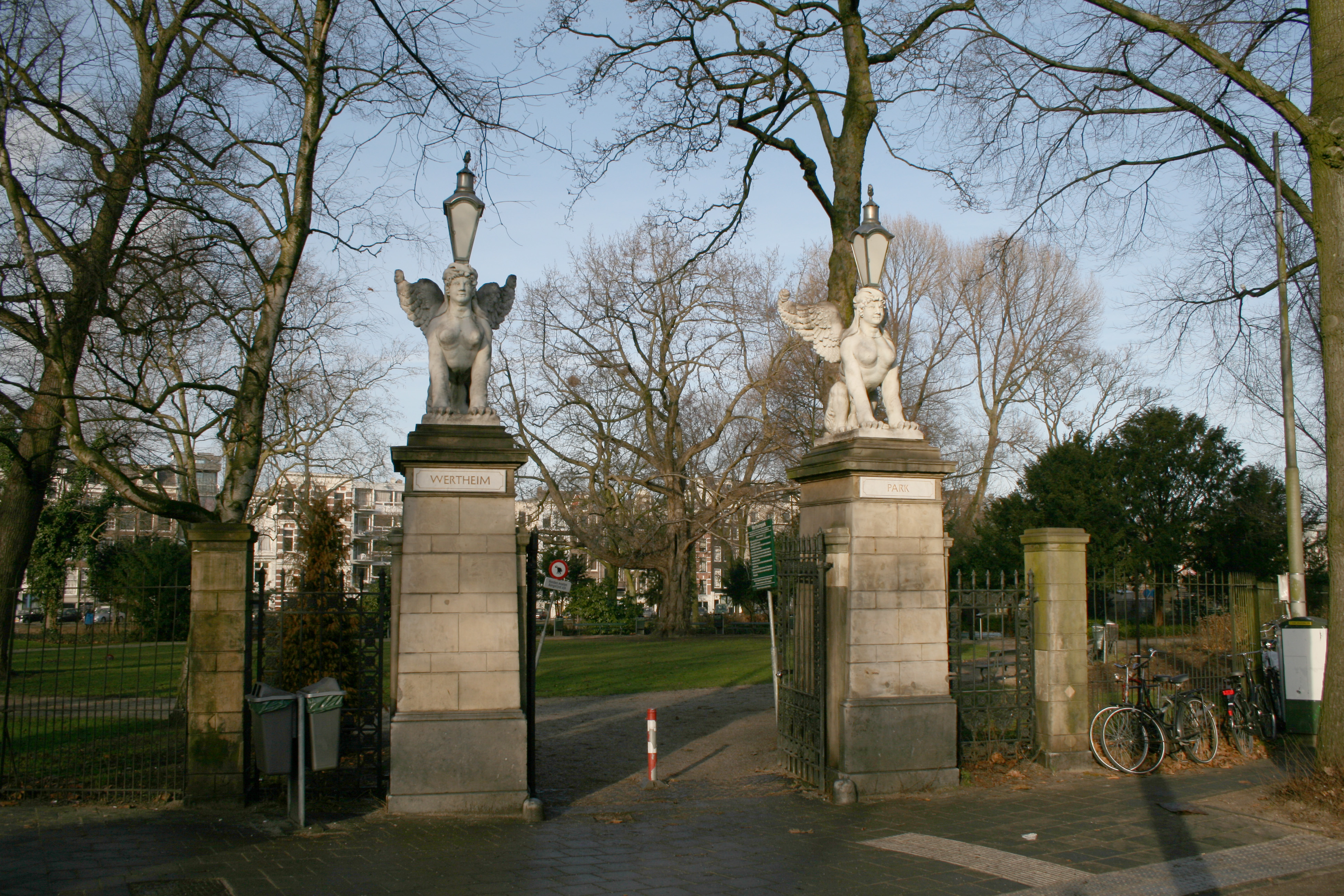
Sphinxes at the entrance of the Wertheimpark in Amsterdam (2007)

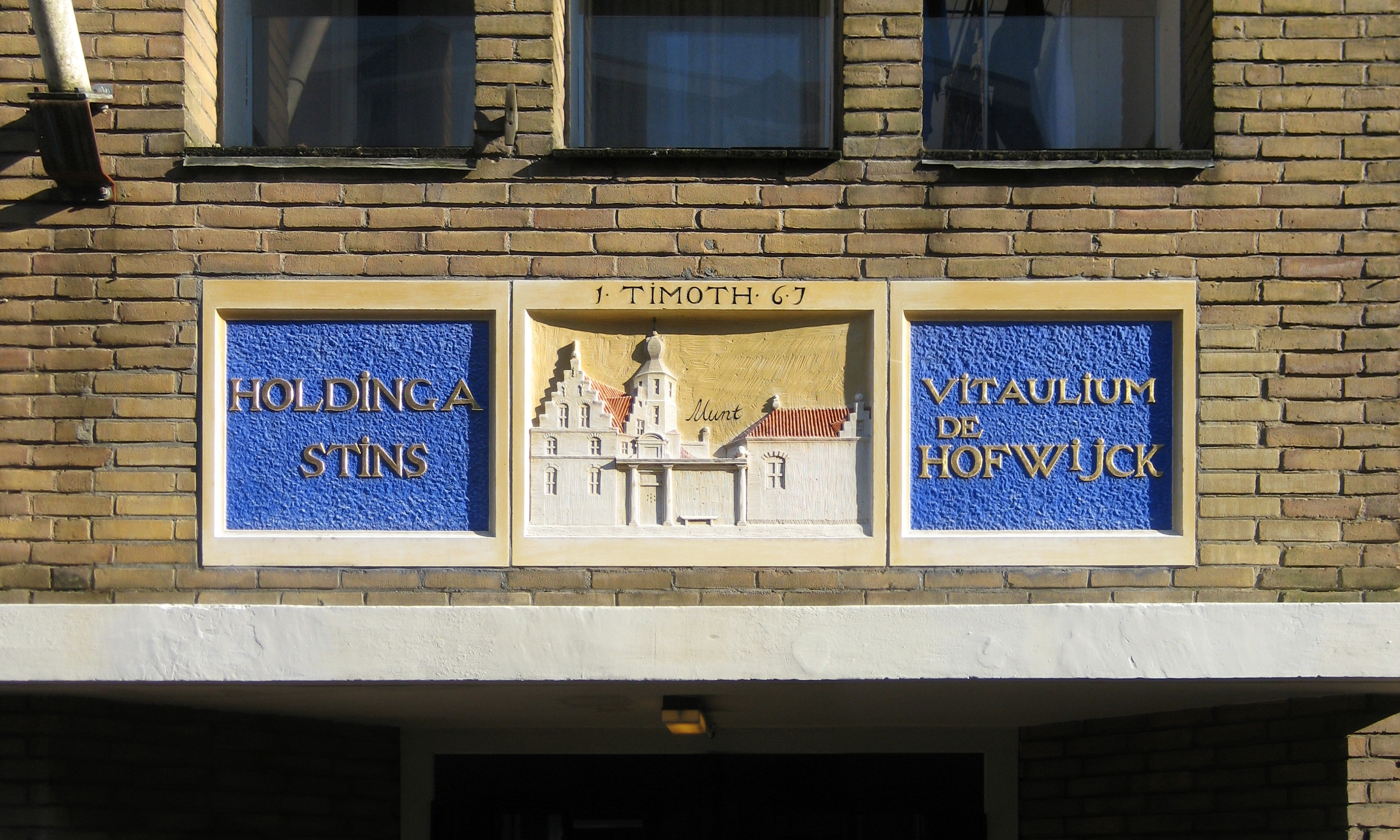
Gable stone in Leeuwarden (2014)

Johan George (Hans) 't Mannetje (9 September 1944 in Hillegom – 2 May 2016) was a Dutch sculptor, mostly known for his gable stones.

He studied for several years at the Rijksacademie van Beeldende Kunsten and was executor at City Sculptor Hildo Krop. At the end of the 1960s, 't Mannetje founded the restoration workshop Restauratieatelier Uilenburg in Amsterdam. The goal was to restore and produce sculpted parts for monumental buildings. In the 20 years of its existence, the atelier formed itself into a school for sculptors and specialists. 't Mannetje also sculpted modern gable stones, dozens of these stones are to be found in the city center of Amsterdam. He also sculpted several free standing statues, amongst them are the winged marble sphinxes at the entrance of the Wertheimpark and the pillar bearing turtle, made out of marble and hardstone, at the Sint Antoniesluis. He had his atelier in Gorssel, Gelderland.
