= Annemarie Spilker =

Dutch photographer (born 1980)

Annemarie Spilker (born 1980, Hillegom) is a Dutch photographer best known for her self-portraits and landscapes. Spilker attended The Photography Academy in Amsterdam where she graduated cum laude in 2003, with the series self-portraits "Searching to fill the emptiness..."

Spilker's photography focuses on penetrating self-portraits with an uncomfortable and confronting atmosphere, in which she searched for the hidden places in her own personality. Her landscapes appear almost unreal due to the unprecedented silence and timelessness. Since college, Spilker has worked mainly with a medium format Hasselblad, the reason most of her images are square. Sometimes she works with antique medium format cameras from around 1930–1940.

She is a member of the World Photography Organisation.

In 2012 Annemarie started the art collaboration Bulbfiction. Bulbfiction is a collaboration of 5 artists living in De Duin en Bollenstreek (Flower District) in Holland.

== Awards ==
- Honorable Mention category Fine Art, 12th International Color Awards 2019
- Honorable Mention, Lucie Awards 2013 (The Lucie Foundation)
- Honorable Mention, Lucie Awards 2012 (The Lucie Foundation)
- 2 Honorable Mentions, Lucie Awards 2011 (The Lucie Foundation)
- Bronze Award, The 5th Photograph of the year Competition 2011 (Better Photography Magazine)
- Nomination Gouden Gerbera 2011, fine-art prize (Kunstzinnig.nl)
- Artmajeur Silver Award 2011 (Artmajeur.com)
- Nomination category People 5th Black and White Spider Awards 2010 (World Photographic Arts Corporation)
- Artmajeur Silver Award 2010 (Artmajeur.com)
- Extra price Academy Award 2003 (Photo Academy Amsterdam, the Netherlands)
- 2 Nominations Academy Award 2003 (Photo Academy Amsterdam, the Netherlands)

== Exhibitions ==
- Frozen Memories, Galerie de Burgerij, Vorden, The Netherlands, 2013
- Black and white, Galerie de Oude Pomp, Warmond, The Netherlands, 2013
- Fine Art Competition, Galerie 't Oude Raadhuis, Warmond, The Netherlands, 2012
- Silent Impressions!, Galerie 't Oude Raadhuis, Warmond, The Netherlands, 2011
- Frozen memories!, Hilton Hotel Slussen, Stockholm, Sweden, 2011
- Gouden Gerbera Award Winners Show, Het Glazen Huis, Amsterdam, the Netherlands 2011
- Lente, Le Bon Mangeur, Scheveningen, The Netherlands, 2011
- Frozen Memories, Spaarne Ziekenhuis, Hoofddorp, The Netherlands, 2011
- Dit ben ik!, Galerie de Stoker, Amsterdam, the Netherlands, 2011
- Frozen Memories, Theehuis Rhijnauwen, Bunnik, The Netherlands 2010
- Klik, Galerie Fotogram, Amsterdam, the Netherlands 2004
- Klik, Hotel Arena, Amsterdam, the Netherlands 2003
- Academy Award, Galerie Fotogram, Amsterdam, the Netherlands 2003
