= Jacob Cornelis van Slee =

Dutch Reformed clergyman and scholar (1841–1929)

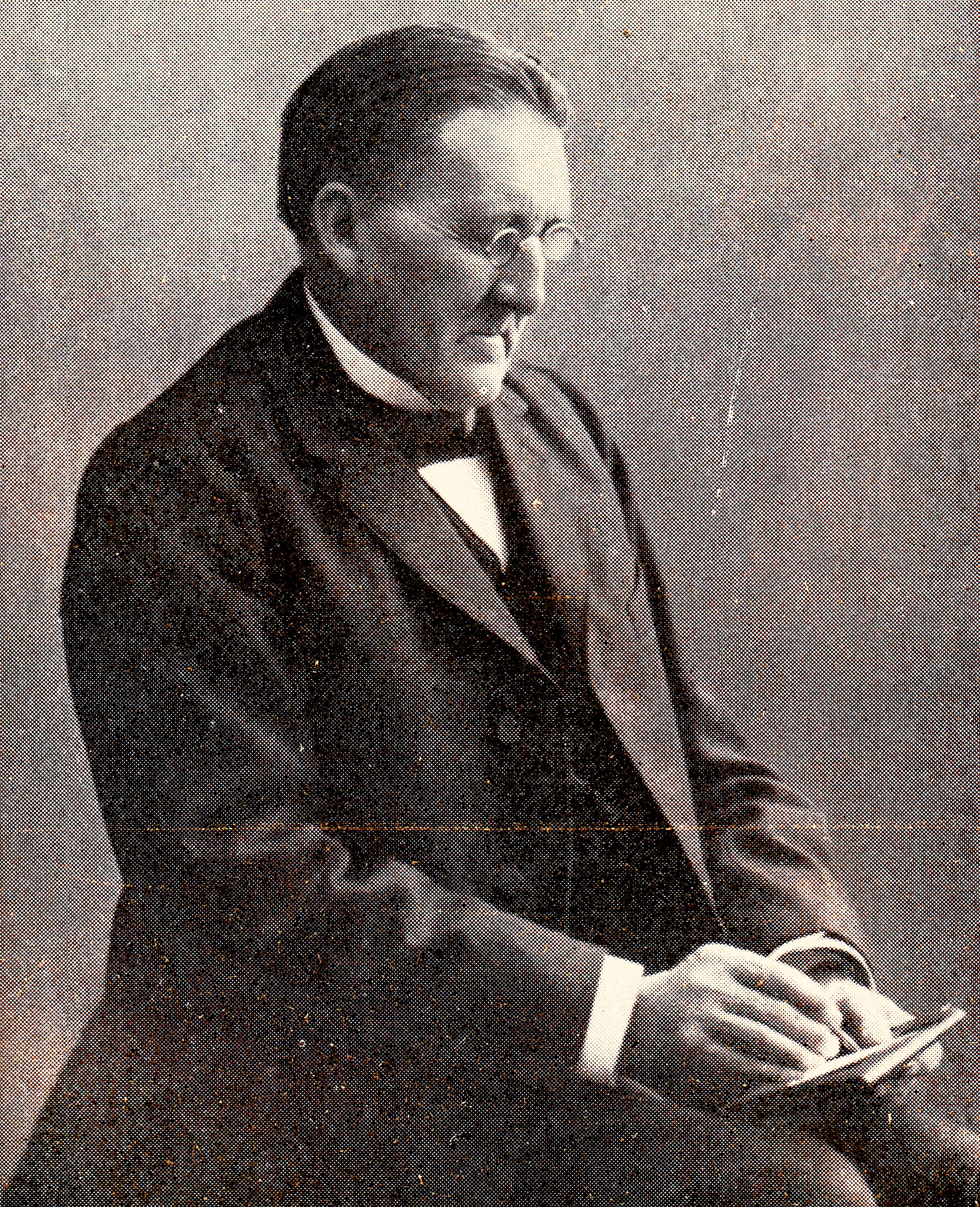
Jacob Cornelis van Slee

Jacob Cornelis van Slee (1841–1929) was a Dutch Reformed clergyman and scholar. He was the author of a study of the Windesheim Congregation, De kloostervereeniging van Windesheim (Leiden, 1874), and between 1875 and 1900 contributed articles on theologians to the Allgemeine Deutsche Biographie.

== Life ==
Slee was born at Hillegom on 23 September 1841, the son of Cornelis van Slee and Anna Barbera Geertruida Romeny. He studied Theology at the Athenaeum Illustre of Amsterdam and at Leiden University. In 1868 he married Elisabeth Kenno and was appointed minister at Herwijnen. Appointments followed at Oostzaan in 1873, at Drumpt in 1877, and at Brielle in 1881. In 1891 he became preacher in Deventer, and in 1892 librarian of the city's Athenaeum Illustre (a sort of liberal arts college). The library had been founded by the city in 1597, on the basis of a medieval collection, and Slee marked the third centenary by publishing a catalogue of the library's holdings.

Slee retired as a preacher in 1914, and in 1914 he received an honorary doctorate from the University of Groningen. In 1917 he organised a major exhibition on Luther in the library at Deventer, to mark the fourth centenary of the beginning of the Protestant Reformation. His wife died in 1920. He himself retired as librarian in 1928, and died on 21 November 1929. He was buried in Diepenveen, where he had lived since retiring as a preacher in 1913.

== Works ==
- Catalogus Dissertationum et Orationum theologicarum defensarum et habitarum ab Ao. 1650 ad 1850 in academis Neerlandiae, Germaniae, Sueciae, collectarum a Fred. Muller (Amsterdam, 1868)
- De kloostervereeniging van Windesheim, een filiaalstichting van de broeders van het Gemeene leven (Leiden, 1874)
- Een leerjaar der Zondagsschool ten gebruike bij het lager godsdienstonderwijs (Tiel, 1879)
- Het visioen van Broeder Maarten (Tiel, 1880), a Dutch translation of Gaspar Núñez de Arce's La visión de Fray Martín.
- De volksdichter Hans Sachs in betrekking tot de Kerkhervorming der 16de eeuw (Amsterdam, 1879)
- Een gezegend aandenken, het deel van den brave. Leerrede over Spreuken X: 7a bij gelegenheid van het overlijden van D.J.H. van Tusschenbroek, Em. pred. van Rumpt, overl. 7 Mei 1880 (Tiel, 1880)
- 26 Juli 1581 na drie eeuwen herdacht. Leerrede over Ps. LX : 14a. Met God zullen wij kloeke daden doen. Uitgesproken 24 Juli 1881 te Brielle (Brielle, 1881)
- Hermannus Moded (Amsterdam, 1883)
- Catalogus der Handschriften berustende op de Athenaeum-Bibliotheek te Deventer (Deventer, 1892)
- De Rijnsburger Collegianten (Haarlem, 1895)
- Catalogus van de Athenaeum-Bibliotheek te Deventer. 1ste Deel. Werken van Algemeenen aard, Opvoeding en Onderwijs, Wijsbegeerte, Land- en Volkenkunde, Geschiedenis (Deventer, 1896)
- A.A. van Otterloo, Johannes Ruysbroeck, Een bijdrage tot de kennis van den ontwikkelingsgang der Mystiek, edited by J.C. van Slee (The Hague, 1896)
- Diarium Everardi Bronchorstii sive Adversaria omnium quae gesta sunt in Academia Leydensi (1591–1627), edited by J.C. van Slee (The Hague, 1898)
- Catalogus van Geschriften en Boekwerken, voornamelijk betrekking hebbende op de Litteratuur der Nederlandsche Koloniën, afkomstig uit de Bibliotheek van wijlen mr. J.A. Duymaer van Twist, namens hem vermaakt aan de Athenaeum-Bibliotheek te Deventer (Deventer, 1898)
- Catalogus van de Athenaeum-Bibliotheek te Deventer. 2de Deel. Taal- en Letterkunde, Schoone Kunsten, Godsdienstgeschiedenis en Godgeleerdheid (Deventer, 1900)
- Franciscus Martinius, Predikant te Epe 1638–1653. Historische bijdrage tot de kennis van het kerkelijk, maatschappelijk en letterkundig leven in het midden der 17de eeuw (Deventer, 1904)
- Geschiedenis van het Socianisme in de Nederlanden (Haarlem, 1914)
- Adriaan Florisz. v. Utrecht, de eenigste Nederlandsche paus (Amsterdam, 1914)
- De Illustre School te Deventer 1630–1878 met Album Studiosorum (The Hague, 1916)
- Catalogus van de Luthertentoonstelling op 22–25 Oct. 1917 (Deventer, 1917)
- Mededeelingen aangaande 't klooster St. Janscamp buiten Vollenhove (Utrecht, 1904)
- Het Necrologium en Cartularium van het Convent der reguliere Kannunikessen te Diepenveen (Utrecht, 1907)
- Gedachtenisrede uitgrespr. d.J.C. van Slee bij gelegenheid van zijn 40-jarige ambtsvervulling 12 Juni 1908 in de Groote kerk te Deventer (Deventer, 1908)
- Catalogus van de Chineesch-Indische boekverzameling der Athanaeum-Bibliotheek (geschenk van de heer B. Hoetink) 1925 (Deventer, 1927)
