= Richard Thilthorpe Slee =

Australian engineer

Richard Thilthorpe Slee (1879–1935) was an Australian mining engineer. He was General Manager of the BHP mine at Broken Hill, Australia. Notable for his mining rescues, he was killed in a mine accident in 1935.

== Early life ==
R.T. Slee was born in Sydney on 29 August 1879, the eldest son of Richard Slee (1831–1912) and Mary Ann Slee (née Thilthorpe). His parents had nine children, of whom five boys and two girls survived to adulthood.

His father, a native of Devon, England, was proprietor of the Slee Stove Works, a foundry at Woolloomooloo, winning medals for his patent fuel stoves from the Royal Agricultural Society of New South Wales and at the Sydney International Exhibition (1879). Some of those medals are now in the Powerhouse Museum collection. Prominent in public affairs, Richard Slee served as an alderman of Rookwood Municipal Council, being elected its first mayor in 1892. He also supported many charities, including the NSW Deaf, Dumb, and Blind Institute, of which he was made a life member.

== Early Mining Career ==
Educated in Sydney, Richard Thilthorpe Slee graduated Bachelor of Engineering from Sydney University in 1901. Shortly afterwards, in 1902, he joined BHP. In 1905 he was admitted as a member of the Australasian Institute of Mining Engineers. His first position was assistant surveyor at Broken Hill, two years later being appointed Assistant Underground Manager, and then Underground Manager in 1911.

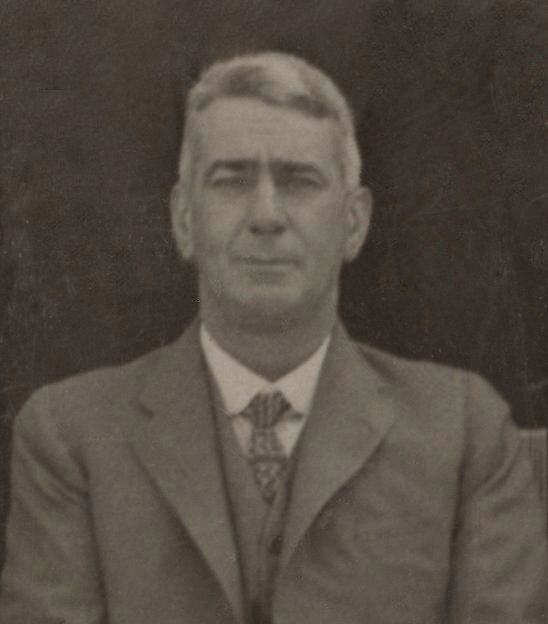
Richard Thilthorpe Slee, 1926.

His younger brother, John Thilthorpe Slee, served in the Boer War. Another younger brother, Arthur Thilthorpe Slee, wounded at Gallipoli in 1915, was killed in action at Pozieres, France in August 1916. His youngest brother, Frank Thilthorpe Slee, served on the Western Front, in 1917 being awarded the Military Medal for bravery. Although wounded in action, Frank survived the war.

== General Manager, BHP Broken Hill ==
Owing to a strike in 1919 that brought about a shut down at Broken Hill, Richard Slee was transferred to the booming BHP Newcastle Steelworks for about 12 months. In 1921 he returned, where he succeeded Edward James Horwood as General Manager of BHP mining operations at Broken Hill, a position he occupied until his death. In this capacity, his close associates included Essington Lewis (1881–1961) who, when the City of Whyalla was being established by BHP., honoured him in the naming of Slee Street.

Richard Slee was a member of the Geological Sub-Committee of the Scientific Society of Broken Hill, and was instrumental in the discovery of a new mineral, bernalite, Fe(OH)3, though he never knew of this achievement. Around 1921 he noticed a strange mineral in the upper level workings of the BHP mine. Containing dark green octahedral crystals on concretionary goethite and coronadite, he passed specimens on to the noted geologist Frank Leslie Stillwell (1888–1963) for investigation. In 1927 Stillwell incorrectly concluded they were known minerals. The specimens remained unnoticed in the Department of Geology at the University of Melbourne until 1990 when they were re-examined by scientists. It was then realised they were a new and unknown mineral, being named bernalite in honour of eminent crystallographer and science historian John Desmond Bernal (1901–1971).

Tall and slim, with a reserved but efficient demeanour, R.T. Slee was one of the most highly respected managers of the mines at Broken Hill. Although prominent in the Mining Managers’ Association, he was also well regarded by his employees and the unions for the consideration he gave to them.

== Mining Rescues ==
Slee had much experience in fighting outbreaks of fire in underground workings. This knowledge gained him such a wide reputation that other companies sought his services in times of these emergencies.

Well known for his bravery, he was involved in many gallant mining rescues at Broken Hill. Among the more notable were the Central Mine fire, the Block 14 fire (in which he received an award from the Royal Humane Society) and the Block 13 fire in 1916. In this fire, with another, Richard Slee rescued two men overcome by gas, even though nearby workmen and miners considered the risk too great and refused to go to their assistance.

== Accidental Death ==
It was said of him, "He would never ask a man to do a thing he would not do himself." On 18 October 1935, with three other mine employees, he descended a well in Sulphide Street to clear a blocked bore pipe that pumped away seepage emanating from the BHP mine workings. This was not an operation a General Manager would normally attend to, but Richard Slee would not send his men into such a situation without helping them. The four men were overcome by foul air and, despite a desperate rescue operation, all four died of accidental asphyxiation.

A resident of Broken Hill for 36 years, and a prominent citizen, he was a member of many community and business organizations. Aged 56 at the time of his death, Richard Slee was buried in the Broken Hill Cemetery.

He married at Broken Hill in 1905 to Emily Moyle (1880–1963) and they had three children: Richard Mervyn (1906), Gladys Thilthorpe (1908) and Valerie Winifred (1920). Following his tragic death, his family moved to Adelaide, SA.

In 2007 Richard Slee was inducted into the Australian Prospectors and Miners Hall of Fame.

== Select bibliography ==
- Barrier Miner newspaper, Broken Hill, 19 October 1935, pp 2, 3.
- Broken Hill, 1915–1939, by R.H.B. Kearns, Broken Hill Historical Society, 1975, pp 53, 60, 61
- Slee Family History, ca.1490-1976, by Max Slee, ISBN 0-9597436-0-X, p 115
- American Mineralogist, Volume 78, pages 827-834, 1993
- Broken Hill Proprietary Co Ltd Archive, Fishermans Bend, Victoria
