= Gable stone =

Carved architectural features

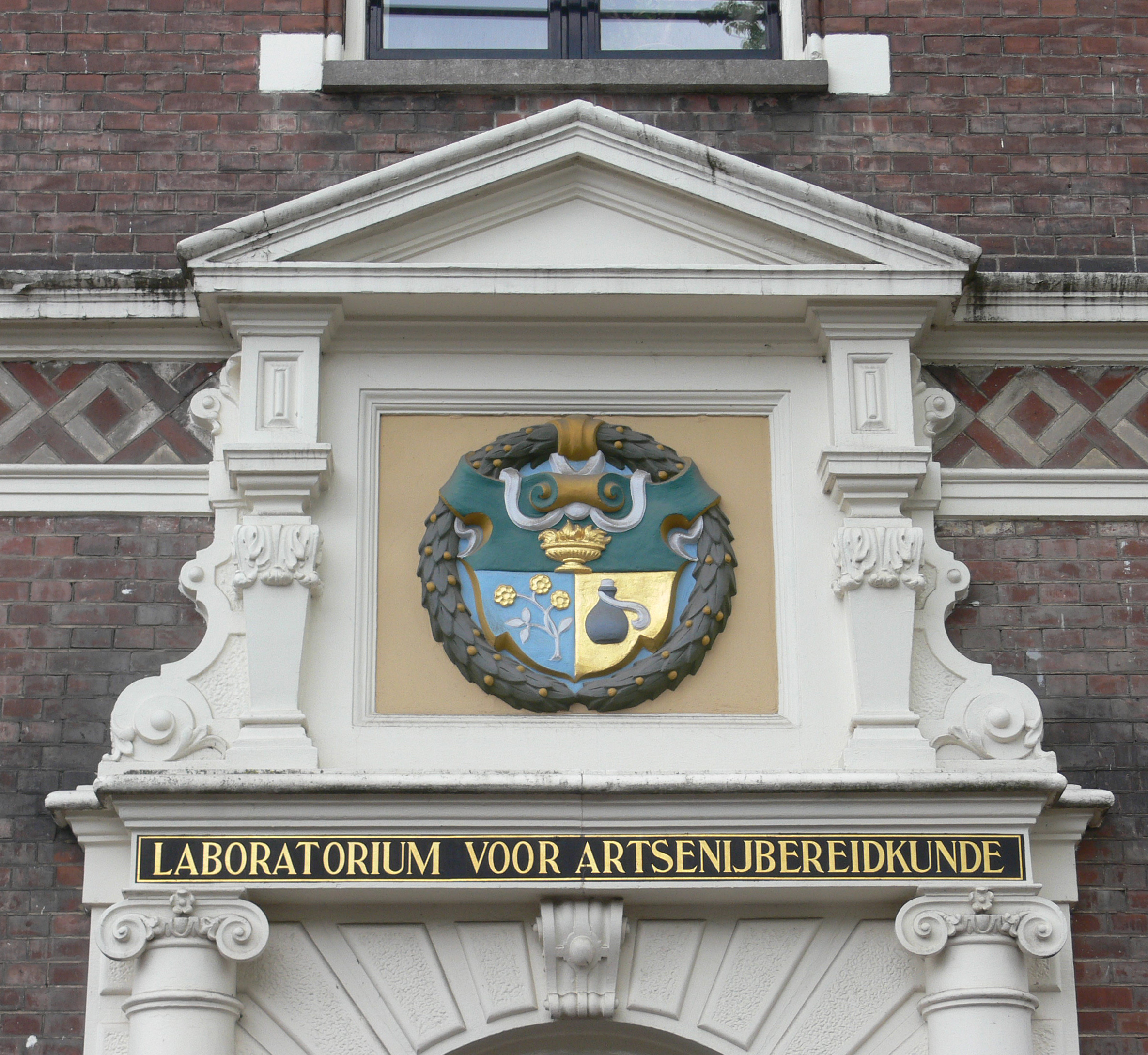
Gable stone from Amsterdam (Netherlands)

Gable stones (Dutch: gevelstenen) are carved and often colourfully painted stone tablets, which are set into the walls of buildings, usually at about 4 metres from the ground. They serve both to identify and embellish the building. They are also called "stone tablets" by the Rijksmuseum, which sometimes appends "from a facade". A "wall stone" is another suggested translation from the Dutch term.

The content of gable stones may explain something about the house's owner and are a feature of the urban fabric of historic cities. Some 2,500 of these stones can still be found in the Netherlands, of which around 850 are in Amsterdam and 250 in Maastricht, while others are also found in cities such as Brussels, Liège, Lille, Oslo, Bergen, Munich, Copenhagen, Bucharest, Zürich, Stockholm and Warsaw.

== History ==
Gable stones came into use in the 16th century, in the days before house numbers, taking over from hanging signs as a way of simultaneously and memorably identifying and adorning a house.

The tradition is alive and has moved with the times – new stones are still commissioned, and for instance the Rabobank at Frederiksplein 54 in Amsterdam wistfully commemorates the introduction of the euro with a stone entitled De eerste en de laatste gulden (The first and the last guilder), created by Zutphen sculptor Hans 't Mannetje.

In Amsterdam, many gable stones have been conserved by the Vereniging Vrienden van Amsterdamse Gevelstenen (VVAG) or Friends of Amsterdam Gable Stones.

== Features ==
They normally combine a picture with an inscription, or sometimes just a date. Some illustrate the name or profession of the owner, for instance a quill pen as a badge for an author, or a ship for a sailor. Some are named after notable people (The King of Bohemia) or faraway trading destinations (Königsberg). Some stones act as talismans, quoting from holy scripture. A pious motto repeatedly found on Dutch gable stones is Nooit Volmaakt (Never Perfect), a testimony to the householder's belief that only God can achieve perfection. Going beyond practicality or superstition, some stones make a joke, usually a visual pun. For instance the "Batenburg" stone from Prinsengracht, Amsterdam, shown here, puns on the words baten (to profit) and burg (castle) to form a playful honor to André Batenburg, a supporter of the city's historic preservation movement who helped conserve the house on which the stone is mounted.

A variation on the theme is a tablet bearing a biblical quotation or more worldly motto, but without an image. (Mediaeval builders also often carved mottos in wooden beams or painted them on plaster panels.) An interesting example is the Dutch-language tablet in Österlånggatan in the Hanseatic old town of Stockholm, Sweden. It reads:

Gaet het wel men heeft veel vrinden
kert het luck wie kan se vinden
[When things go well one has many friends
If your luck changes who can find them?]

== Gallery ==
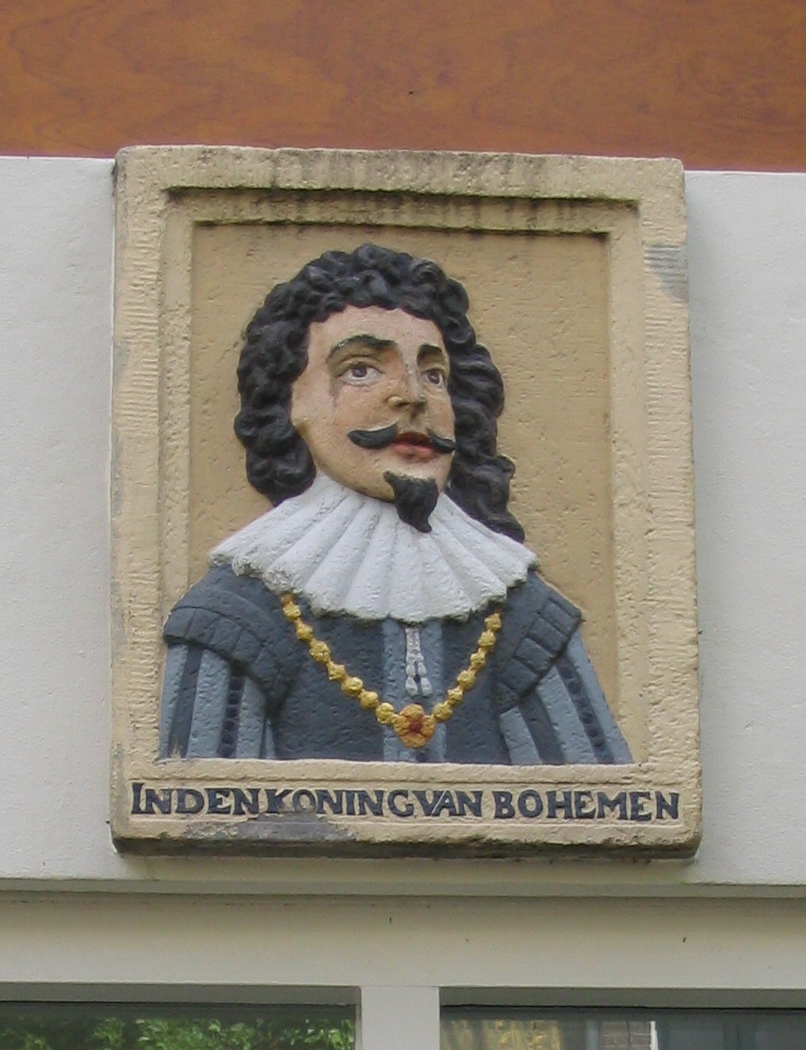
Gable stone commemorating Frederick V of Bohemia, Egelantiersgracht 153–159, Amsterdam

Gable stone of the derelict 16th-century "Old Elephant" tavern, Petite rue de la Violette/Korte Violetstraat, Brussels

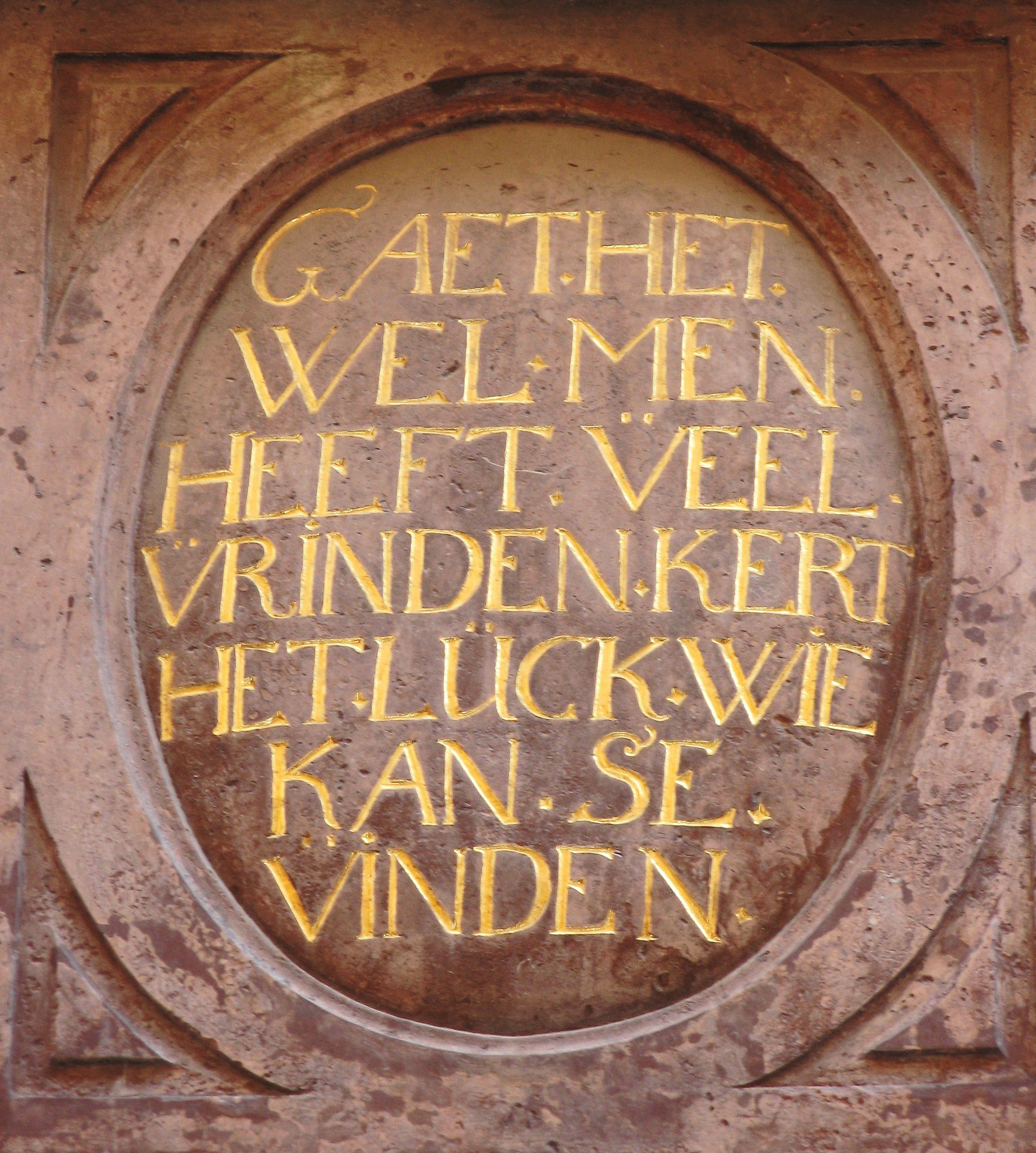
Dutch gable stone in Österlånggatan, Stockholm

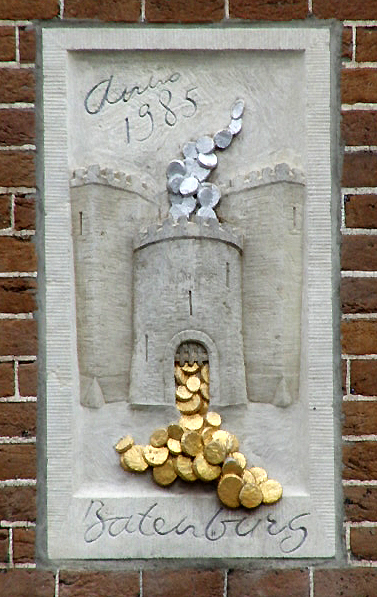
Batenburg gevelsteen, Prinsengracht, Amsterdam

== See also ==
- Gable
- Gaper
- Plaquette
- Pub signs
- Marriage stone
- Datestone
