= Pleyte =

Pleyte may refer to:

- Cornelis Marinus Pleyte (1863–1917), Dutch museum curator; son of Willem Pleyte
- Thomas Bastiaan Pleyte (1864–1926), Dutch politician
- Willem Pleyte (1836–1903), Dutch Egyptologist and museum director; father of Cornelis Marinus Pleyte
