= Ethnographic Museum Artis =

Museum in Amsterdam, Netherlands

Coordinates: 52.365725°N 4.918519°E

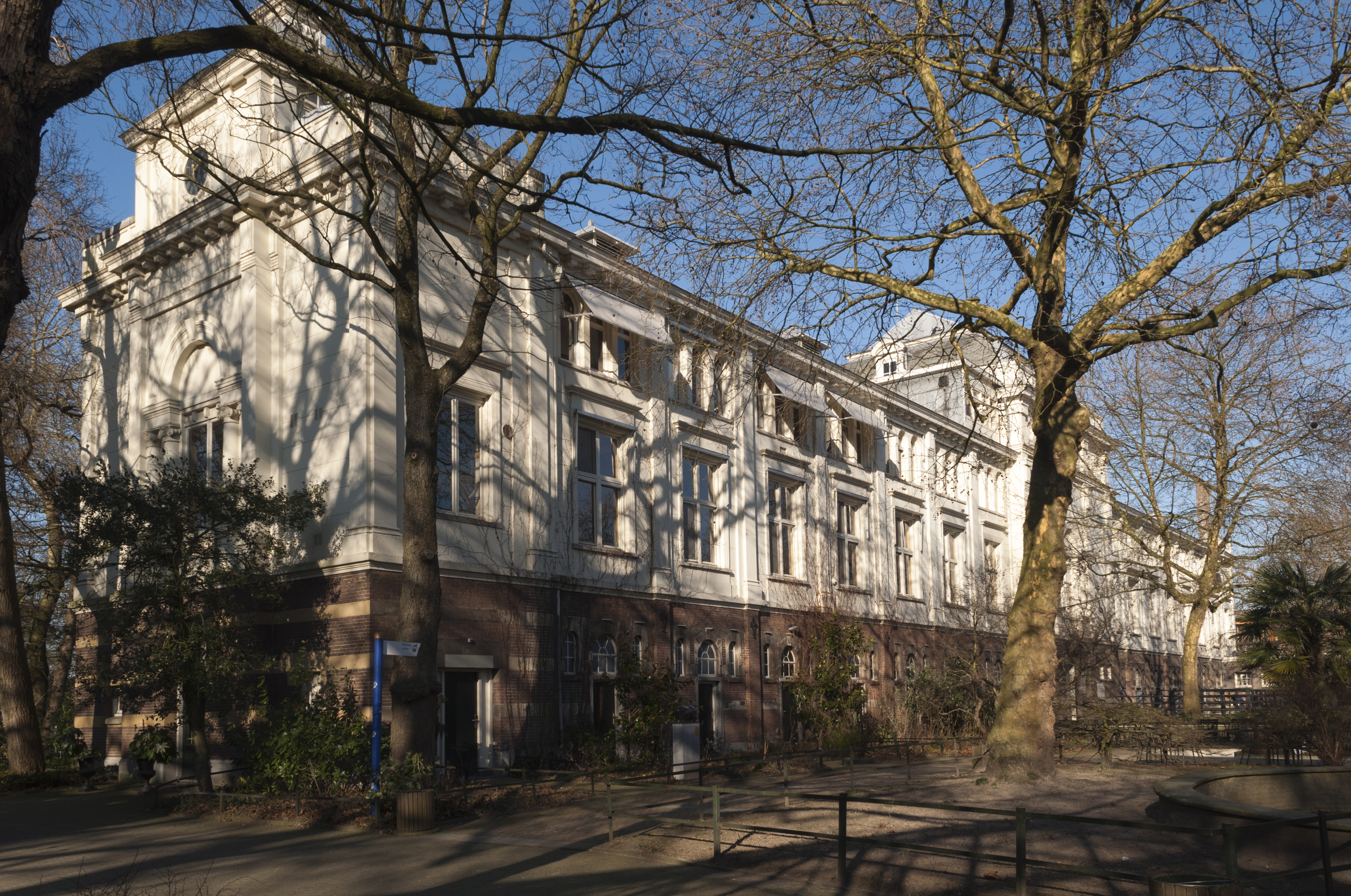
The Ethnographisch Museum Artis was housed in the Volharding building at Artis.

Ethnographic Museum Artis (Dutch: Ethnographisch Museum Artis) was an ethnographic museum in Amsterdam, Netherlands. It was situated at the Artis zoo.

== History ==
The Amsterdam zoo and ethnographic museum were founded in 1838 by the Royal Zoological Society 'Natura Artis Magistra' (NAM). The Society focused on science in general and on presentation of the Dutch colonial territories in particular. Therefore, not only live exotic animals collected, but also many other zoological material (skeletons and preparations), minerals and ethnographic objects. These collections were housed since 1851 in a Natural History Museum, also called the "Great Museum". It soon grew out of the building and the collections of ethnographic objects were separated from the rest and housed in the nearby building of the 'Society Amicitiae', the 'Little Museum". Eventually, the growing ethnographic collection could no longer be housed at the Society Amicitiae building, and in 1888, on the occasion of the 50th anniversary of the zoo, the ethnographic museum was established in the Volharding ("perseverance") building.

The zoo's ethnographic collection stemmed from the desire to understand creation. The Ethnographisch Museum Artis was the third ethnological museum in the Netherlands. Although it was smaller than the Rijksmuseum and the Wereldmuseum, it was not less important. The collection was gathered by individuals, including government officials from the Dutch colonies, missionaries, agents and travelers, but also by companies and scientific societies. Thus, it contained objects that were collected during early scientific expeditions in Dutch New Guinea such as the Etna expedition. There were artifacts made by indigenous populations as well as models of Dutch factories in Java. Material of the World Exhibition of 1883, which was held in Amsterdam, led to a visit to Artis. Eventually, the museum possessed not only pieces from the Dutch overseas territories, but also from China, Korea, Japan, Africa, and Oceania. While the 19th century Korean objects illustrated human cultural diversity, the gendered collection of jackets, belts, slippers, hats and women's underwear was considered incomplete by today's standards. Officially, the Ethnographic Museum Artis existed until 1910. Volharding became too small to house the many thousands of objects and it became outdated. The entire collection was donated to the Vereeniging Koloniaal Institute, who had a Colonial Museum in Amsterdam near Artis. That Colonial Museum became Tropenmuseum. It took over the collection in 1926. Of the original over 11,000 objects from the Artis collection, a large number decayed, but what remained still represents one of the core collections of the Tropenmuseum. A significant number are permanently exhibited.

== People ==
A major donor was the linguist Herman Neubronner van der Tuuk. From 1887 to 1902, the collection was managed by curator Cornelis Marinus Pleyte, who wrote a guide. Though it was published by the Society Natura Artis Magistra, Pleyte and his father, the Egyptologist Willem Pleyte, went on to serve on the board of Brill Publishers.
