= Yos Sudarso Bay =

- formerly known as Humboldt Bay
- Teluk Yos Sudarso (Indonesian)
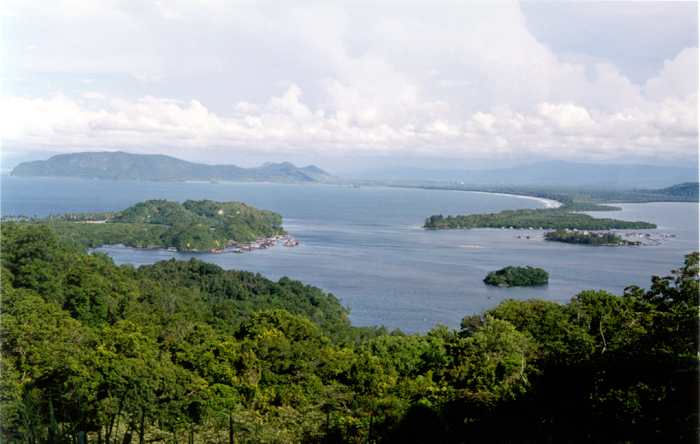
- Yos Sudarso Bay from the skyline overlooking the bay. Villages of Tobati (left) and Enggros (right) are visible in the foreground.

- Location within Western New Guinea
- Location: Southeast Asia
- Coordinates: 2°35′S 140°45′E
- Type: Bay
- Basin countries: Indonesia

Yos Sudarso Bay (Indonesian: Teluk Yos Sudarso), known as Humboldt Bay from 1827 to 1968, is a small bay on the north coast of New Guinea, about 50 kilometers west of the border between Indonesia's province of Papua and the country of Papua New Guinea. The Indonesian provincial capital Jayapura is situated on the bay.

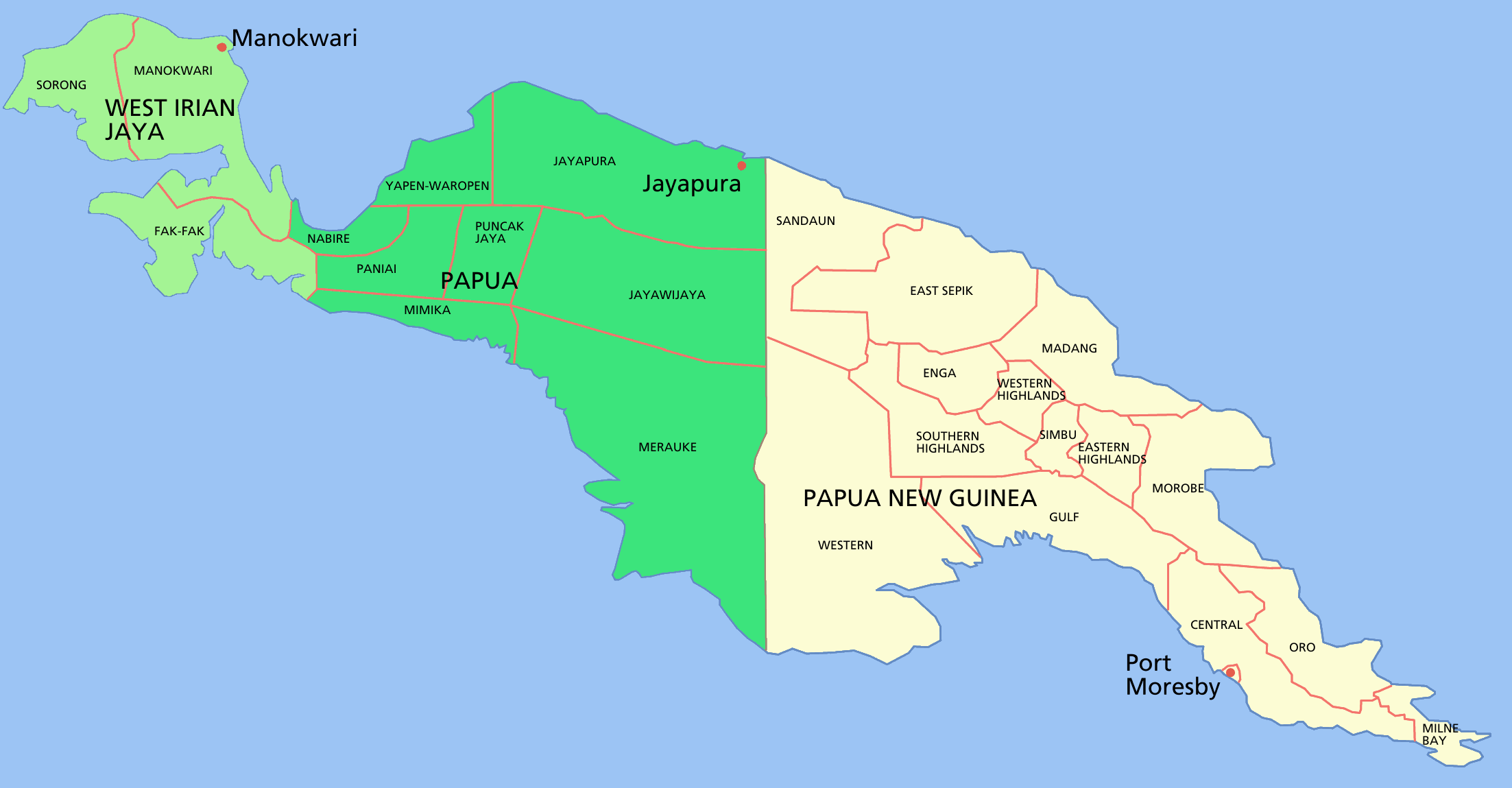
New Guinea. Click the map to see Jayapura and Teluk Yos Sudarso. The bay is the unlabeled indentation northeast of the city, which is in the center of the north coast of the island.

== History ==
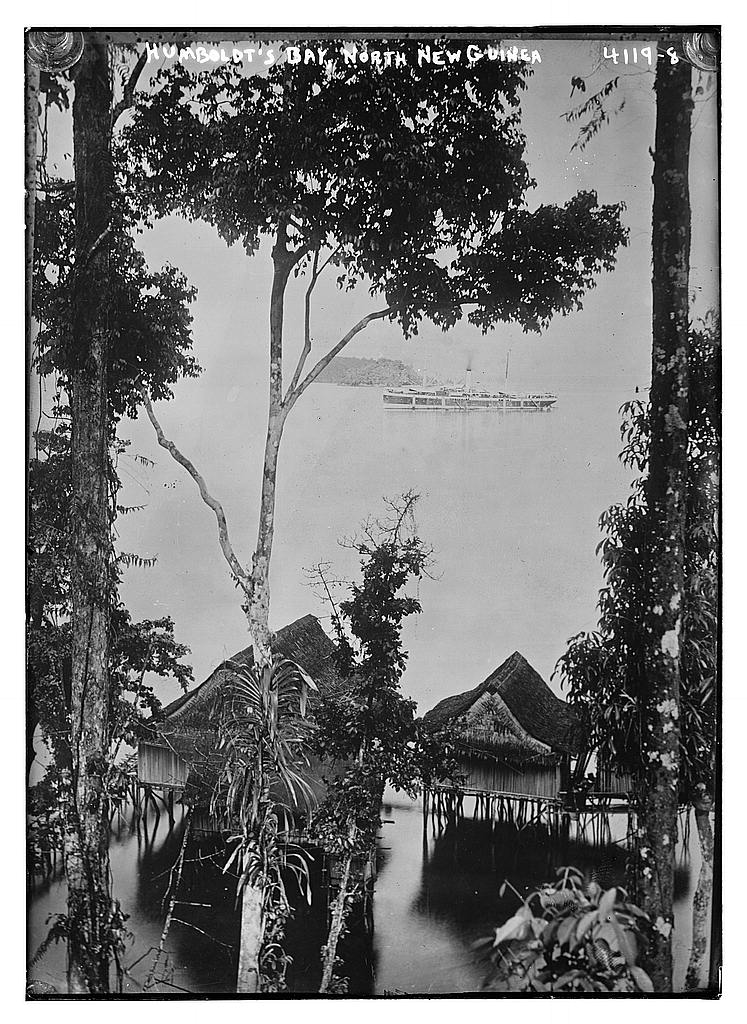
Humboldt Bay in the 1910s

In 1827 the French explorer Jules Dumont d'Urville named the bay after Alexander von Humboldt, after noticing it during his first voyage with an astrolabe. The Dutch Etna expedition of 1858 under Hugo van der Goes was the first to explore and map the bay. Its goal was to find potential locations for the establishment of a permanent government post on New Guinea and this location was found to be superior to others. However, it took until March 1910, prodded by German claims on the northern coast of New Guinea, before the Dutch established a city on the bay, Hollandia. During World War II, the area was occupied by the Japanese in April 1942, was liberated by U.S. forces on April 22, 1944, and became home to a massive U.S. naval base, Naval Base Hollandia. The base served as General Douglas MacArthur's headquarters until the conquest of the Philippines in March 1945.

After Indonesian independence, the city became the capital of Netherlands New Guinea in 1949. It was renamed Kota Baru ("New City") in November 1962, Sukarnopura ("Sukarno City") in 1963 or 1964, and after the Transition to the New Order Jayapura ("Victory City") in 1968. The name Humboldt Bay was retained until at least that same year, when it was renamed after the Indonesian naval officer Yos Sudarso, who perished in a 1962 naval engagement between the Dutch and Indonesians.
