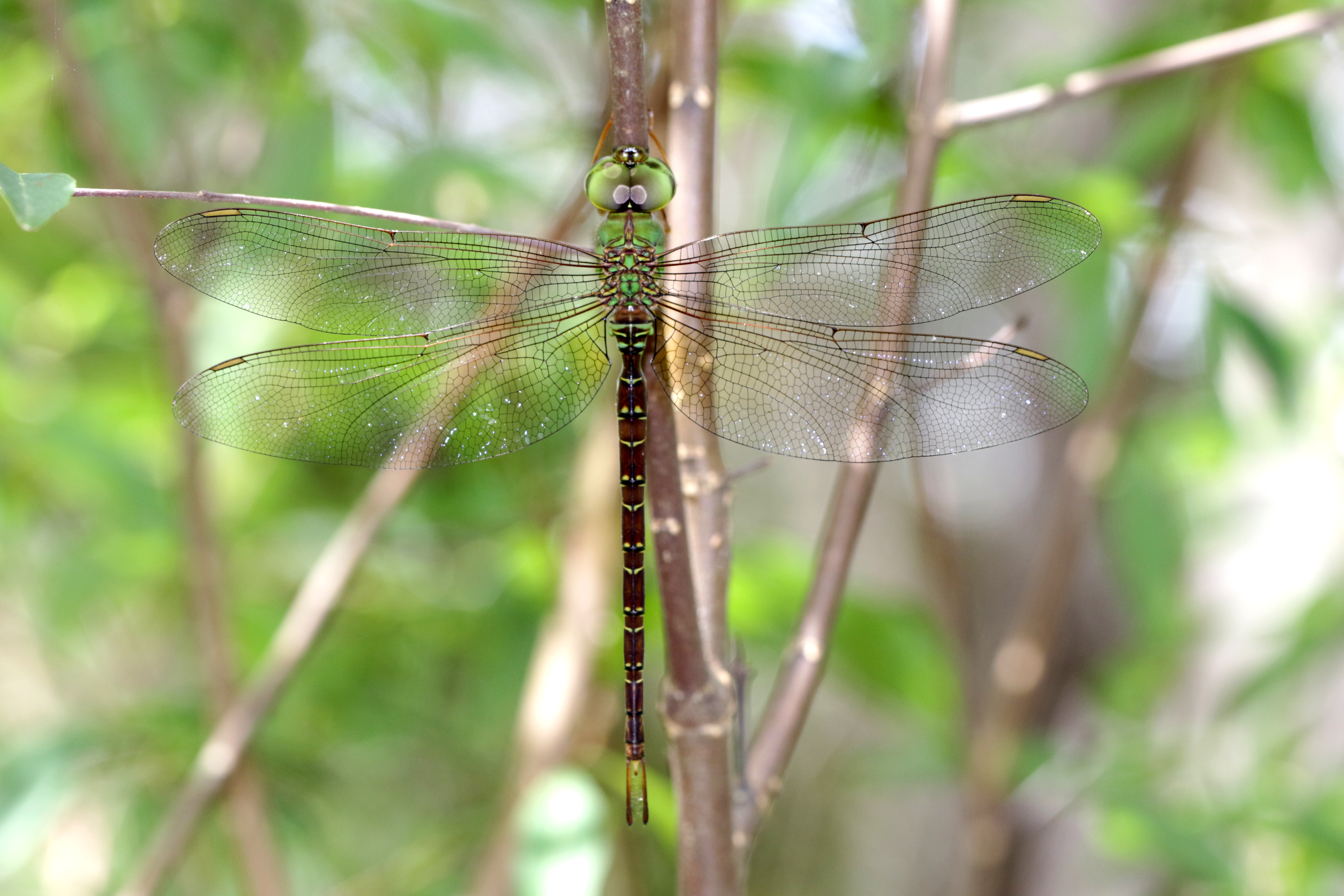
- Male, Queensland, Australia
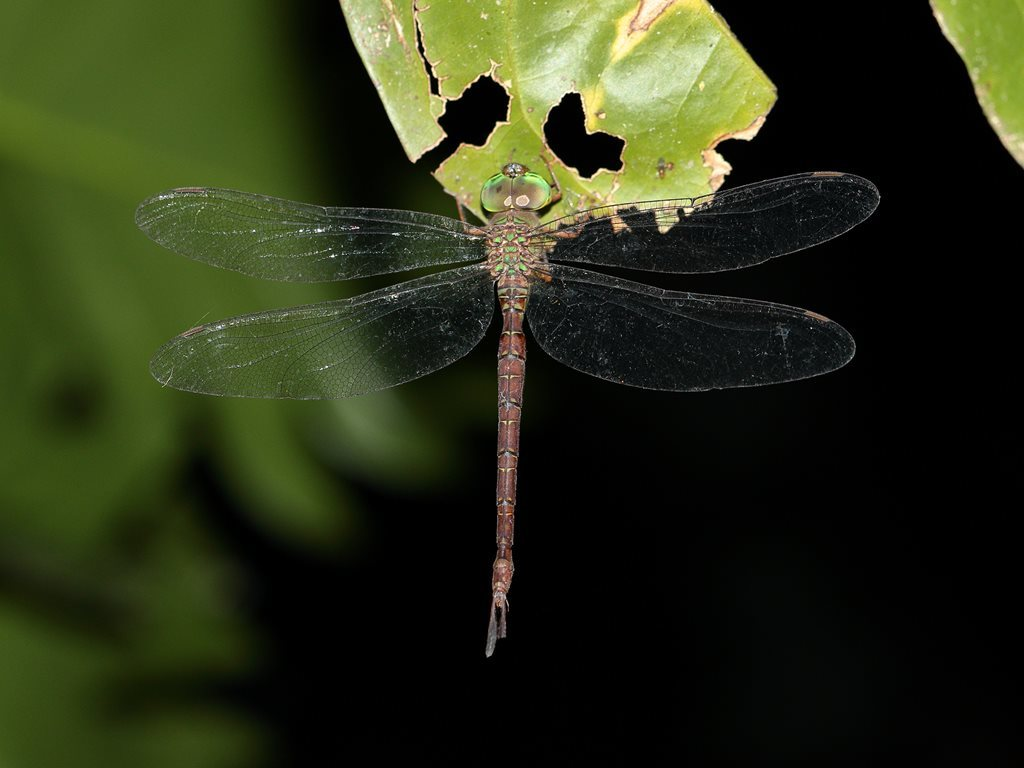
- Female

Conservation status
- Least Concern (IUCN 3.1)

Scientific classification
- Kingdom: Animalia
- Phylum: Arthropoda
- Clade: Pancrustacea
- Class: Insecta
- Order: Odonata
- Infraorder: Anisoptera
- Family: Aeshnidae
- Genus: Gynacantha
- Species: G. rosenbergi

Binomial name
- Gynacantha rosenbergi Brauer, 1867

= Gynacantha rosenbergi =

Grey duskhawker

Species of dragonfly

Gynacantha rosenbergi is a species of dragonfly in the family Aeshnidae, known as the grey duskhawker. It inhabits still waters and is found in New Guinea, Indonesia, through parts of northern Australia, as well as islands in the south Pacific.

== Description ==
Gynacantha rosenbergi is a large dragonfly with a wingspan of about 119 mm and overall length about 85 mm.

It is strikingly coloured. Its abdomen is a dark rusty brown with greenish-yellow markings and its thorax is pale green. Its eyes are green tinged with yellow and, like other members of the Aeshnidae family, are large and joined together at the top. In front of its eyes the frons has a dark marking that looks like the letter 'T' when viewed from above.

=== Abdomen ===
The abdomen is swollen where it joins the body, then forms a distinctive waist of about 2 mm at segment 3. This waist is about half the width of segment 2, the segment closer to the main body. Beyond the waist, the abdomen tapers to the end.

The second segment of the abdomen on a male has light green auricles, miniature ear-like projections on each side.

At the tip of their tails male dragonflies of the genus Gynacantha have a distinctive pair of long, slim, anal appendages with fine hairs on their inner sides. These hold the female during mating. For Gynacantha rosenbergi the tips of the male anal appendages are curved slightly under and towards each other, which helps to distinguish it from other members of its genus.

=== Wings ===
Along the leading edge of the wing the nodus is about halfway and, towards the wing tip, the pterostigma is a creamy coloured patch about 5 mm long.

The wings are translucent. The base of the hindwing is a diffusely golden colour which may extend to the nodus. Males have an angulated base to their hindwings, whereas females have a rounded base. The anal triangle, on the inboard edge of a male hindwing, is broad with three cells.

The forewing triangle is stretched along the wing. The median space is clear without cross veins.

=== Similarities to other species ===
Gynacantha rosenbergi is larger than Gynacantha dobsoni, which in many ways appears quite similar.

== Distribution ==
Gynacantha rosenbergi is not commonly recorded. It has been found from the Moluccas to Vanuatu and New Caledonia. In Australia it has been recorded from coastal north-east Queensland, north from about Townsville. It has been found on Moa Island in Torres Strait and on Groote Eylandt in the Gulf of Carpentaria.

== Behaviour ==
Gynacantha rosenbergi inhabits still waters such as swamps and ponds. It rests in deep shade during the day and flies at dawn and dusk.

== Etymology ==
The genus name Gynacantha is derived from Greek γυνή (gynē, “woman”) and ἄκανθα (akantha, “thorn”). The name refers to the spines at the end of the female abdomen.

In 1867, Friedrich Moritz Brauer named this species rosenbergi, an eponym honouring Carl Benjamin Hermann von Rosenberg (1817–1888), who collected the original specimen while working in the Netherlands East Indies between 1840 and 1871.

== Note on authority ==
The species Gynacantha rosenbergi was described by the Austrian entomologist Friedrich Brauer in 1867, in a paper titled "Bericht über die von Hrn. Dir. Kaup eingesendeten Odonaten" (Report on the Odonata sent in by Director Kaup).

In this work, Brauer examined dragonfly and damselfly specimens sent to him by Johann Jakob Kaup, then director of the Grand Ducal Museum in Darmstadt.

Authorship of the species has been attributed to both Brauer and Kaup in different sources. The World Odonata List currently treats Brauer as the naming authority.

== Gallery ==
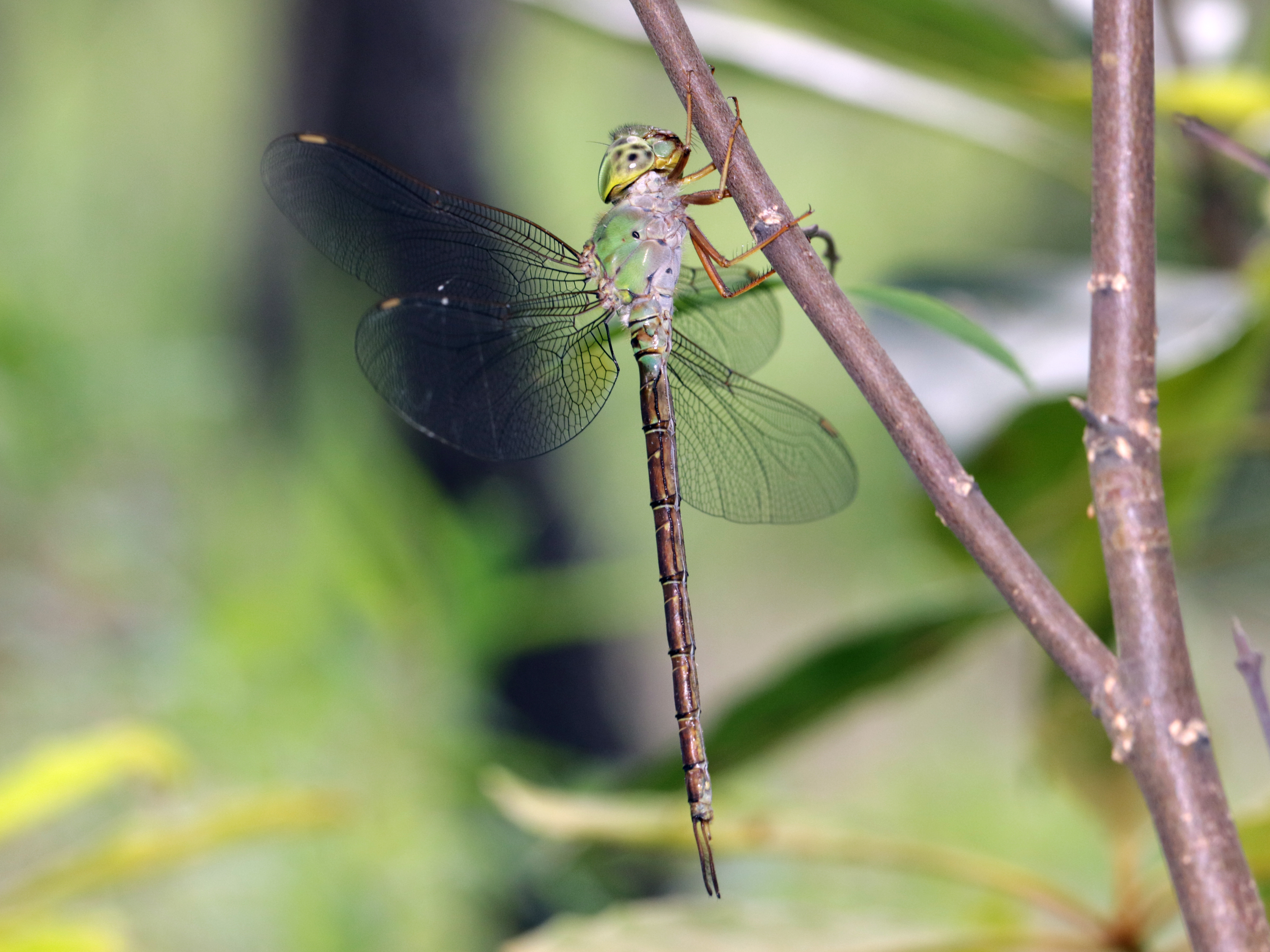
Male grey duskhawker side view from below

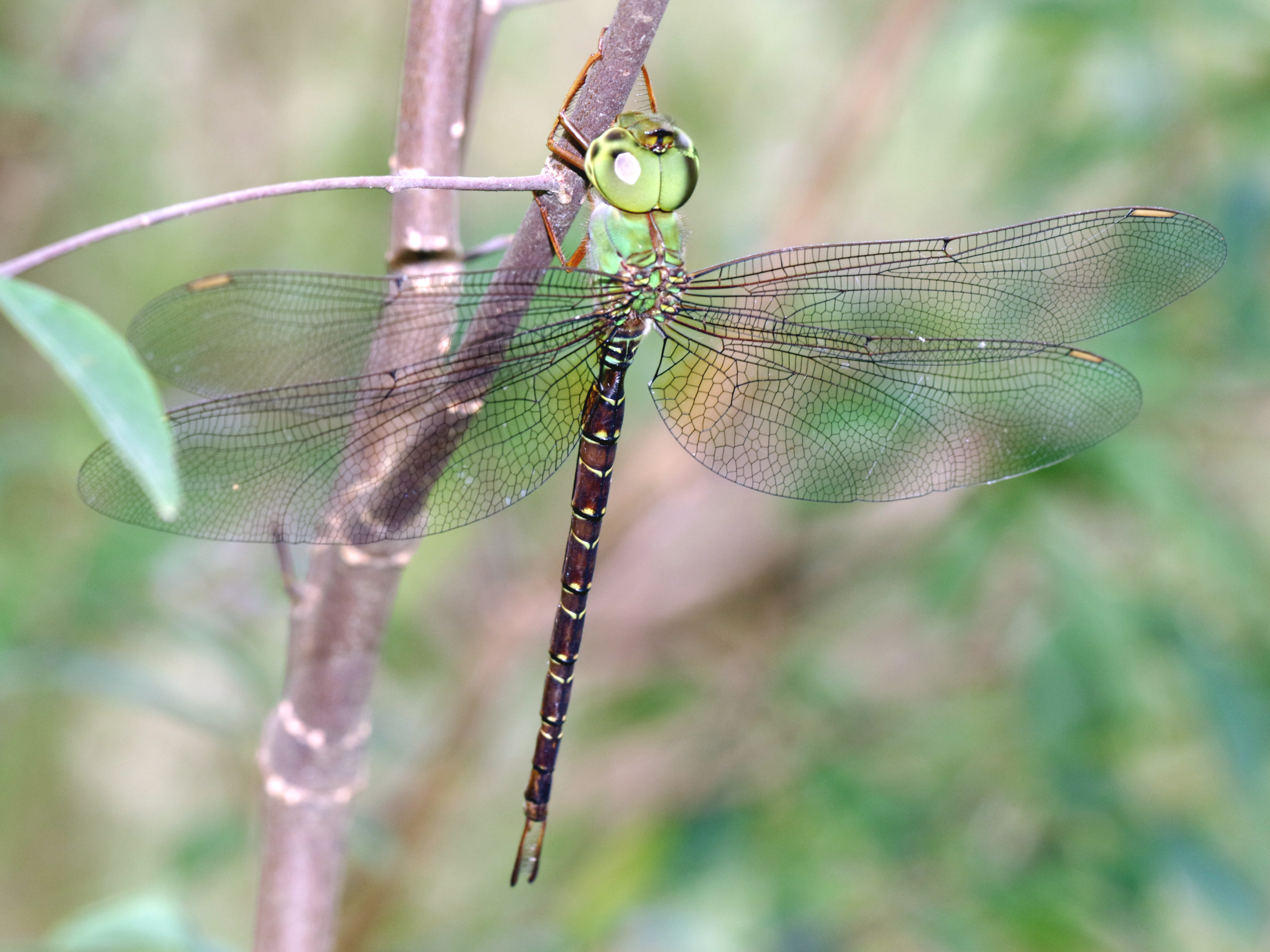
another view of the same dragonfly

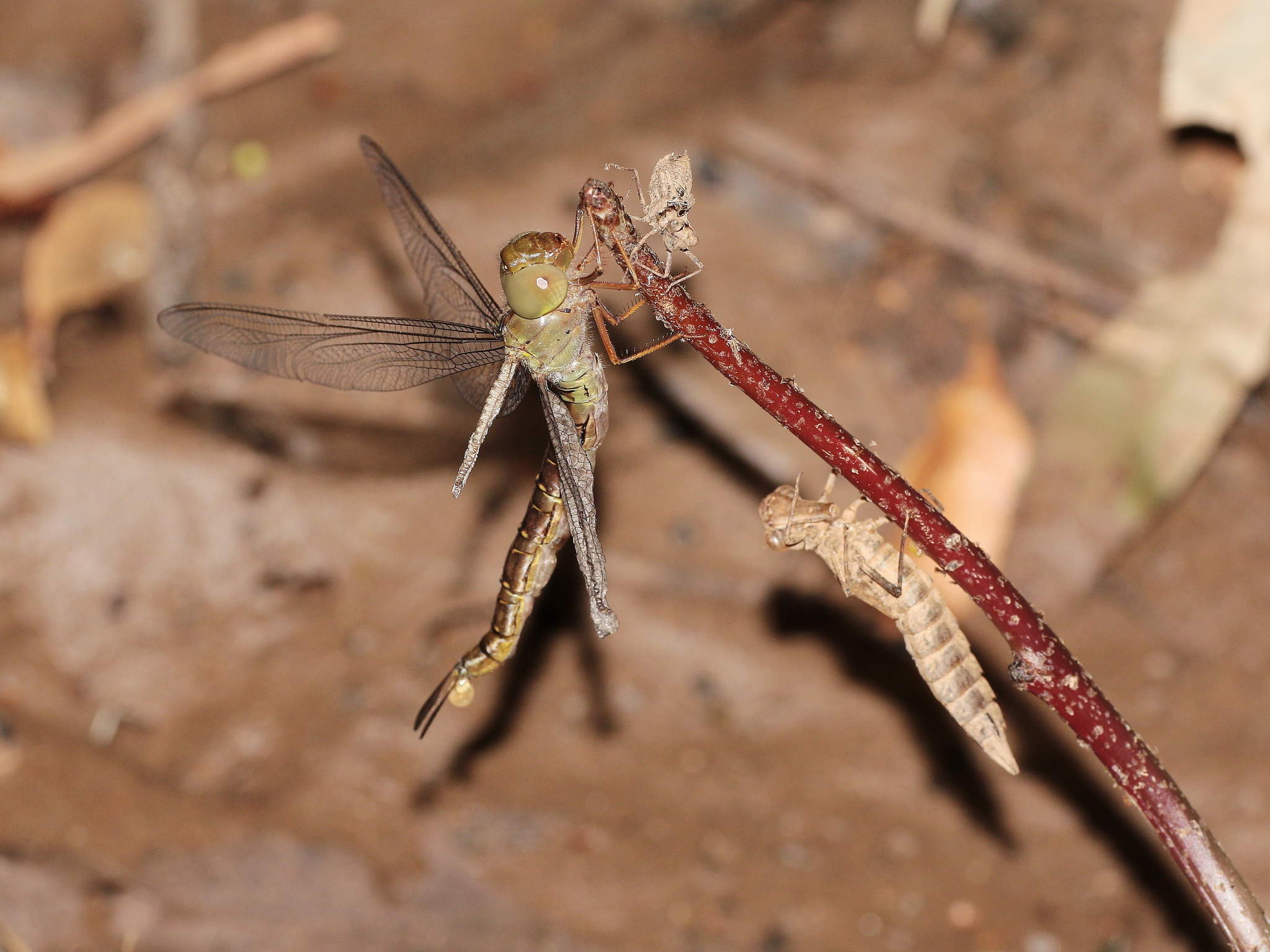
Recently emerged female

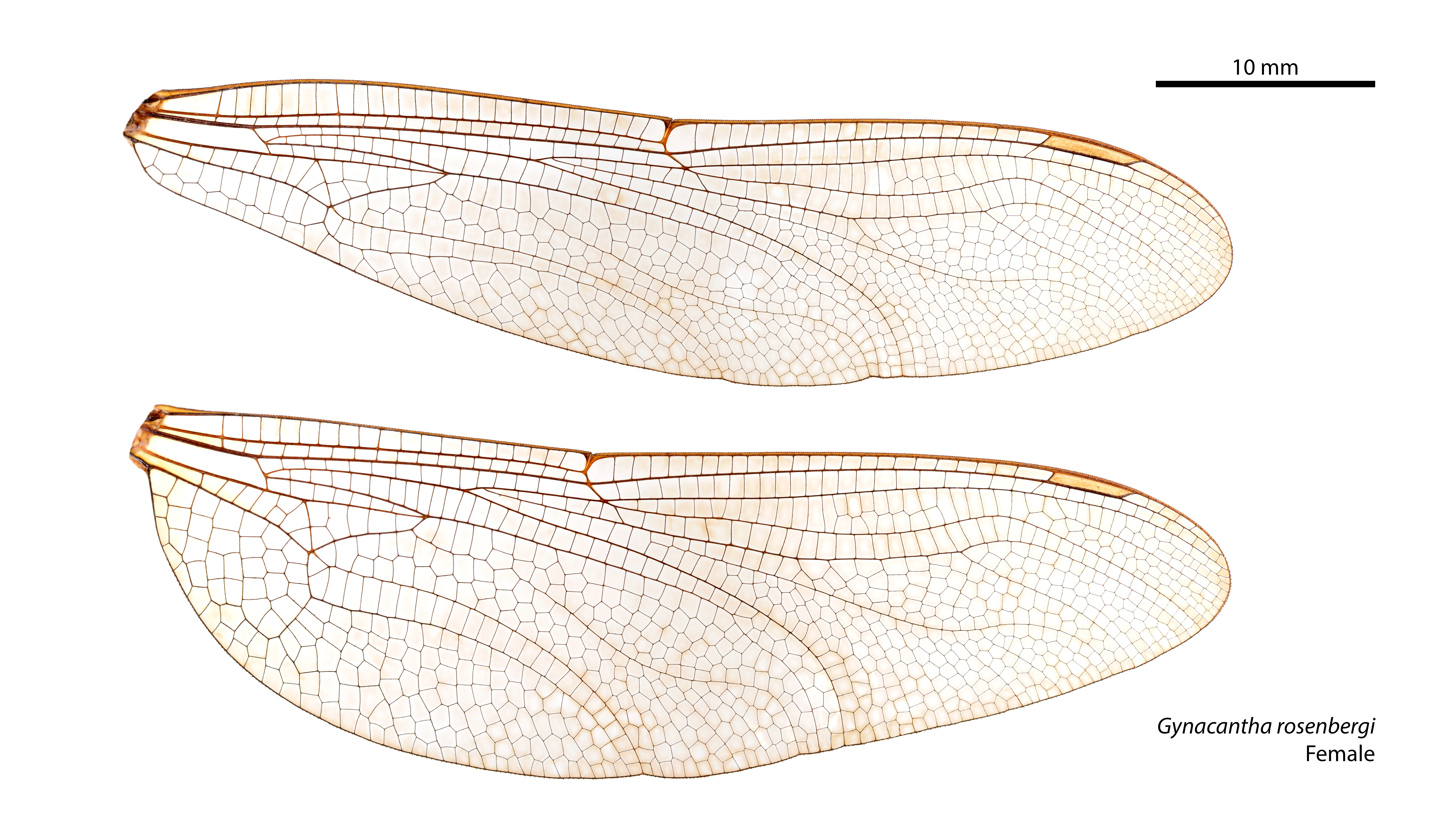
Female wings

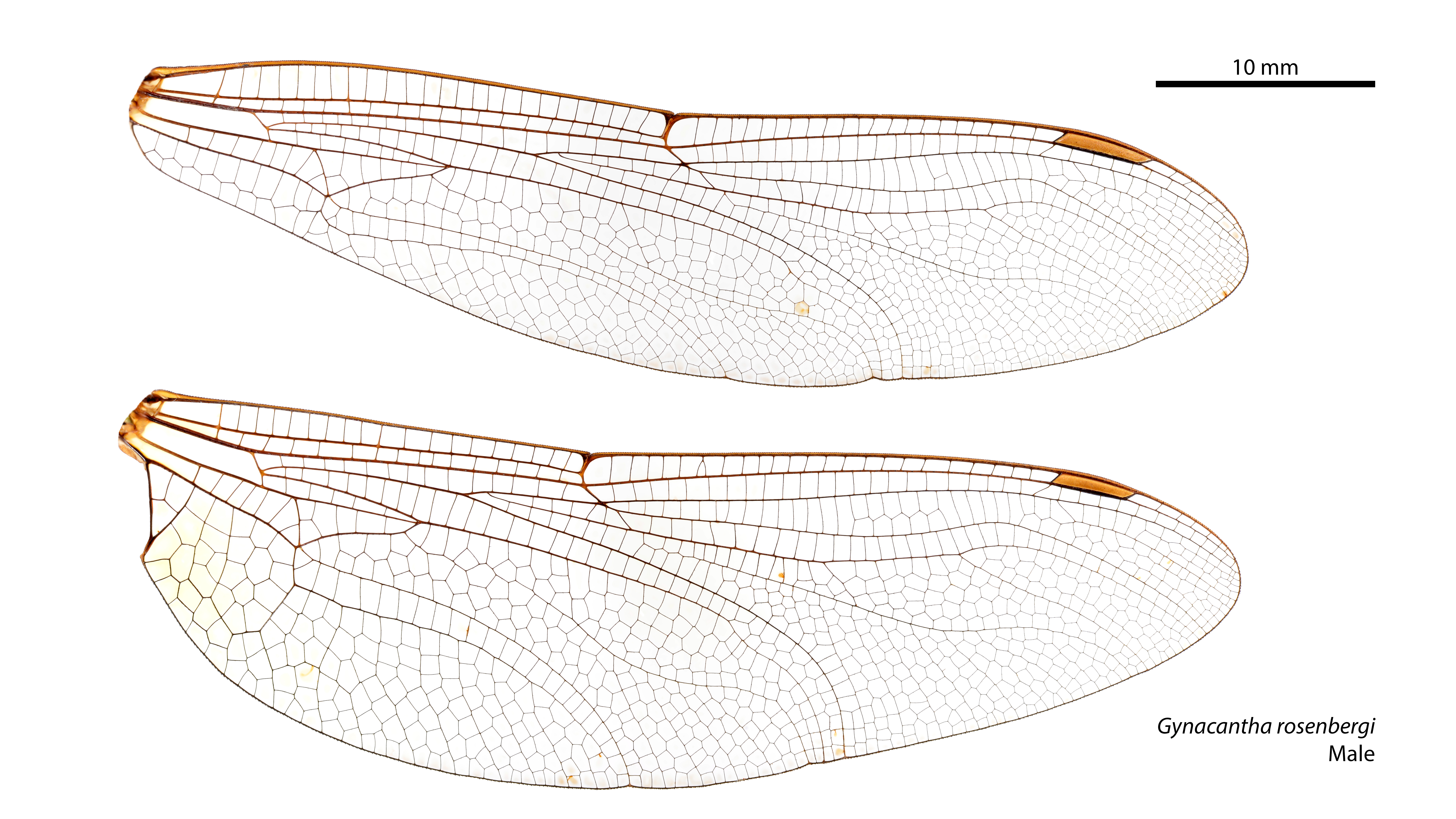
Male wings

Diagram of male abdominal parts

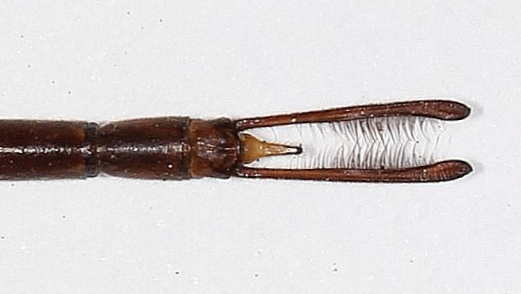
Male anal appendages viewed from above. Note slightly curved tips. Australian Museum specimen K305406

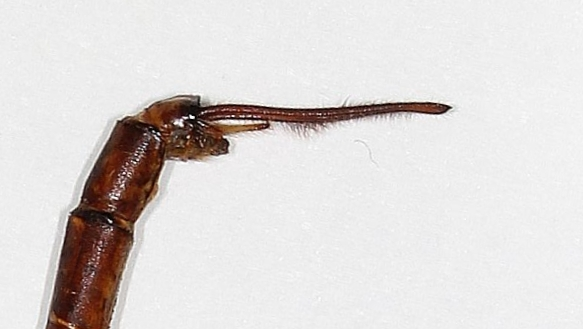
Male anal appendages viewed from the side. Note slightly curved tips. Australian Museum specimen K305407

== See also ==
- List of Odonata species of Australia
