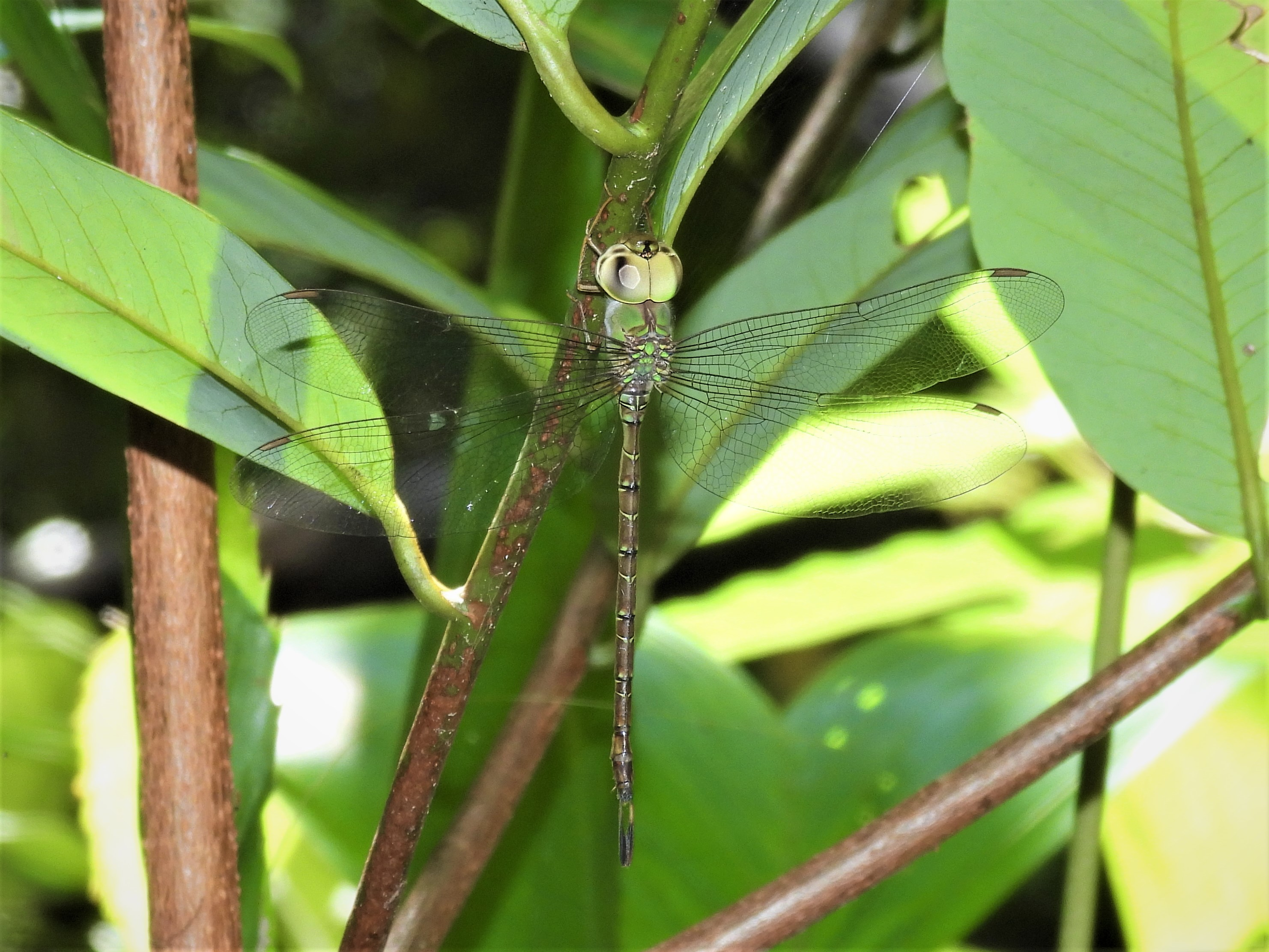
- Female, Darwin, Northern Territory

Conservation status
- Least Concern (IUCN 3.1)

Scientific classification
- Kingdom: Animalia
- Phylum: Arthropoda
- Clade: Pancrustacea
- Class: Insecta
- Order: Odonata
- Suborder: Anisoptera
- Family: Aeshnidae
- Genus: Gynacantha
- Species: G. dobsoni

Binomial name
- Gynacantha dobsoni Fraser, 1951

= Gynacantha dobsoni =

Lesser duskhawker

Species of dragonfly

Gynacantha dobsoni is a species of dragonfly in the family Aeshnidae, known as the lesser duskhawker. It inhabits ponds and swamps and is found in northern Australia.

Gynacantha dobsoni is a large dull-coloured dragonfly with a constricted waist in its abdomen at segment 3. It is smaller than Gynacantha rosenbergi, which in many ways appears quite similar. From 35 specimens of Gynacantha dobsoni held in the Australian National Insect Collection at the CSIRO, an average wingspan of 109mm and overall length (including appendages) of 78mm has been determined. It is a crepuscular insect and flies at dawn and dusk.

== Etymology ==
The genus name Gynacantha is derived from the Greek γυνή (gynē, "woman") and ἄκανθα (akantha, "thorn" or "spine"). The name refers to the spines at the end of the female abdomen.

In 1951, F. C. Fraser named this species dobsoni, an eponym honouring its collector, Roderick Dobson of Sydney, who provided valuable Australian Odonata material and loaned parts of his collection for study.

== Gallery ==
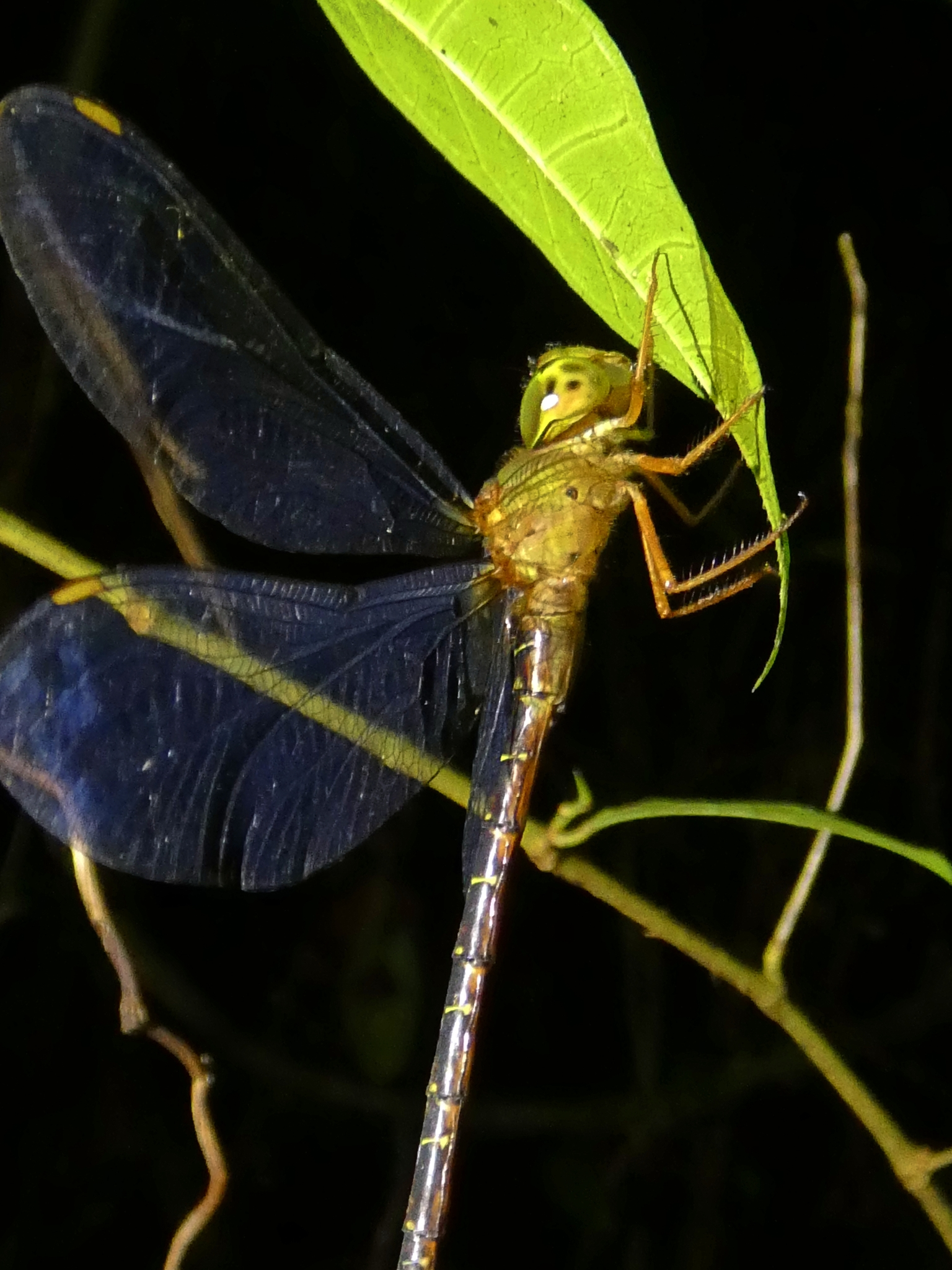
Female

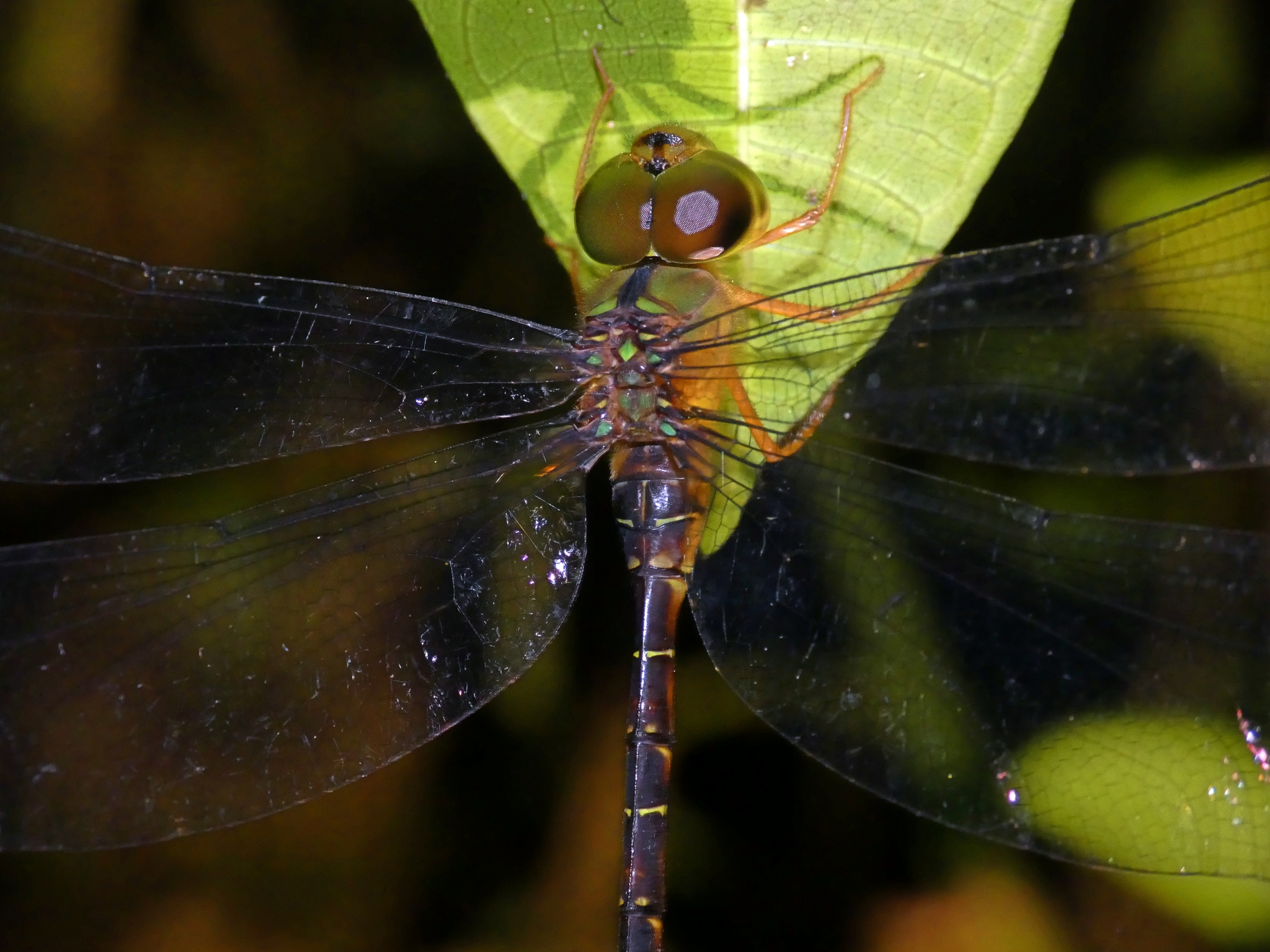
Detail of female showing T-mark on frons

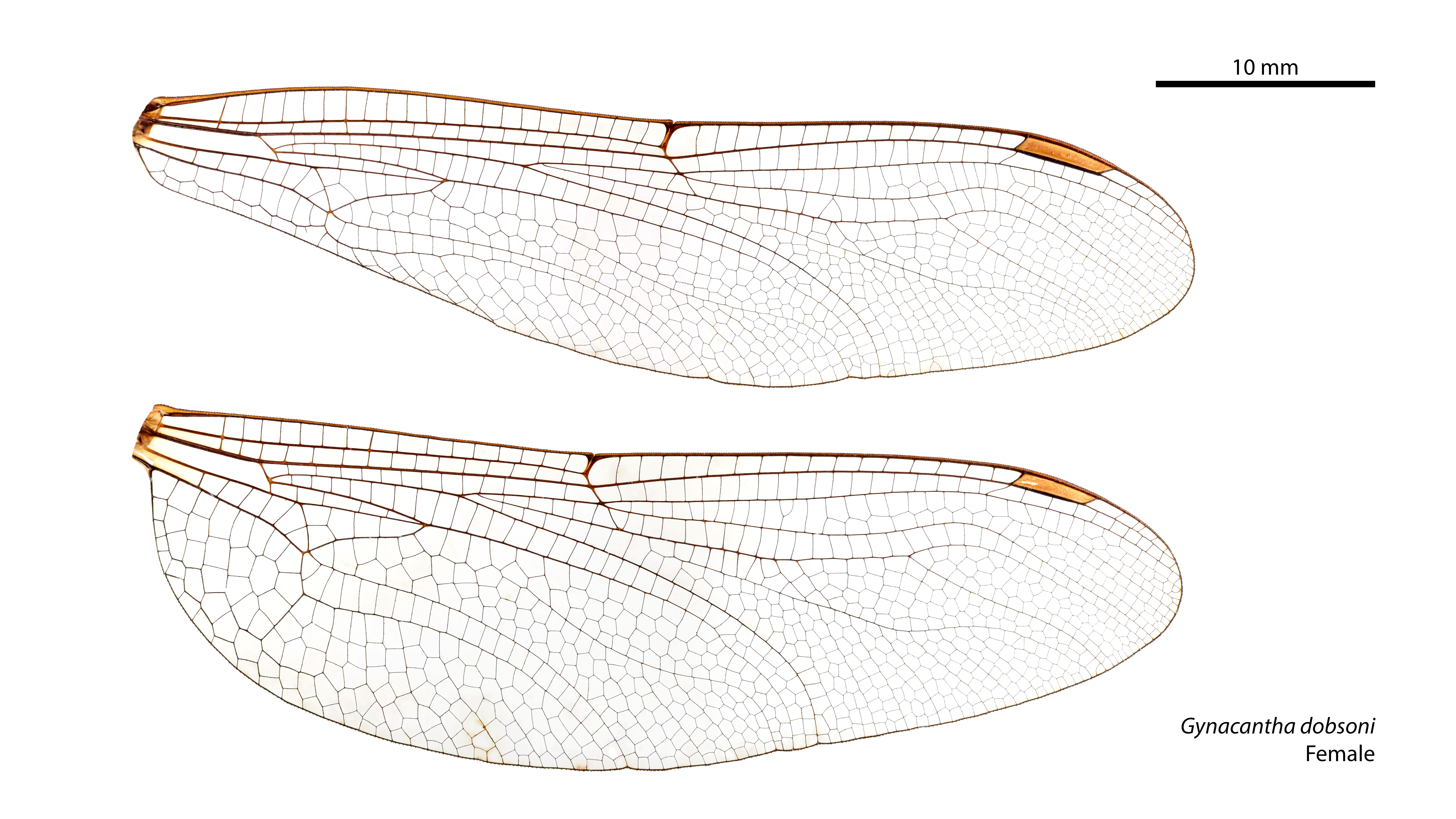
Female wings

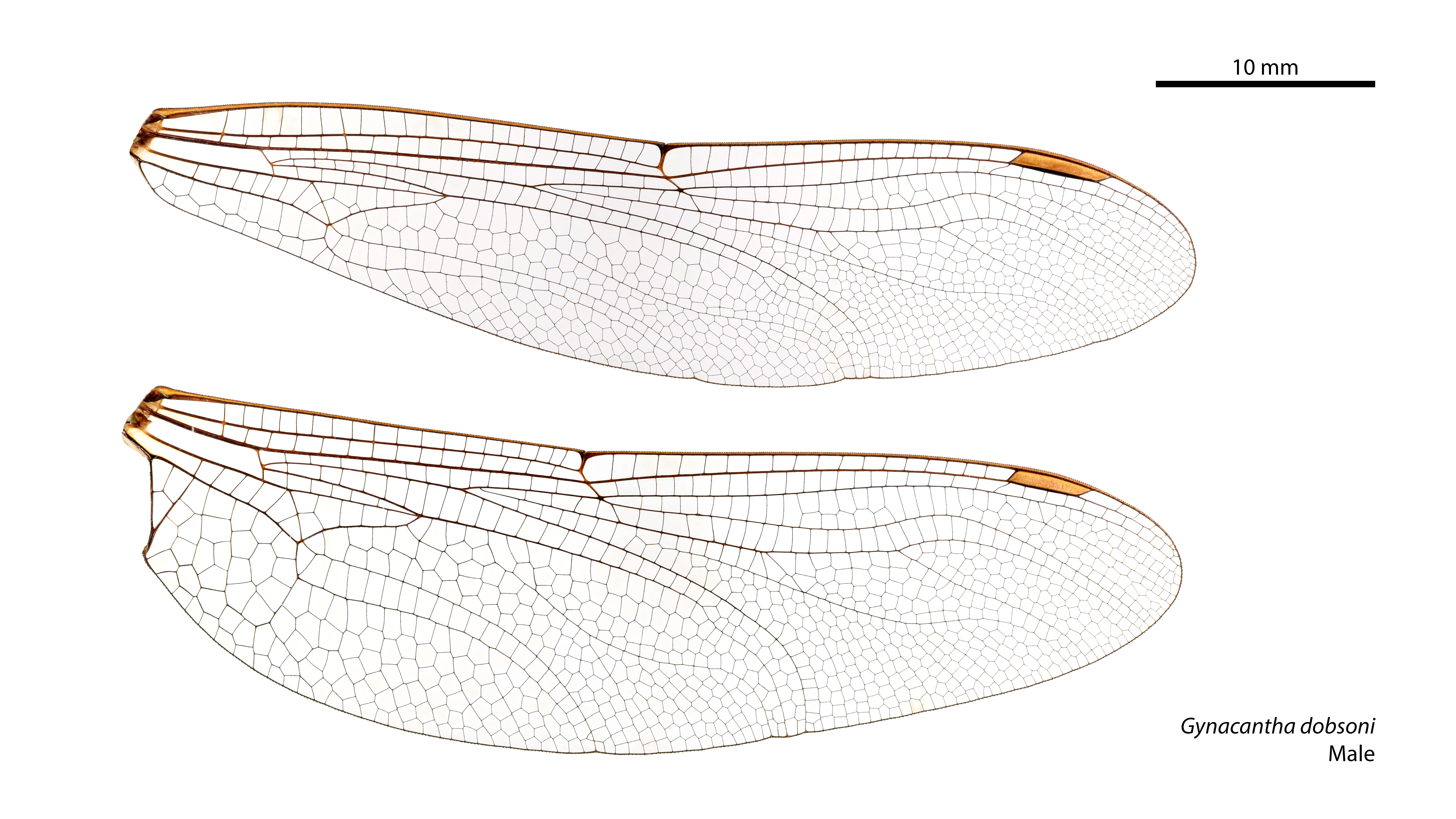
Male wings

Diagram of abdominal parts

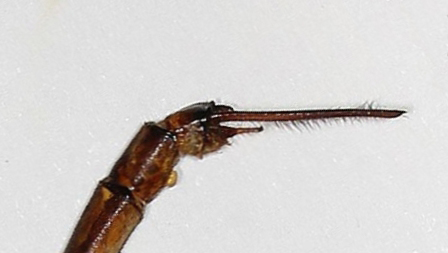
Male anal appendages viewed from the side. Australian Museum specimen K305430

== See also ==
- List of Odonata species of Australia
