= Cornelis Marinus Pleyte =

Dutch museum curator and author (1863–1917)

Cornelis Marinus Pleyte (usually, C.M. Pleyte) (24 June 1863 in Leiden – 22 July 1917 in Batavia) was a Dutch museum curator, Dutch East Indies subject-matter expert, teacher, and author. He was notable for his classification work on neolithic Indonesian adzes.

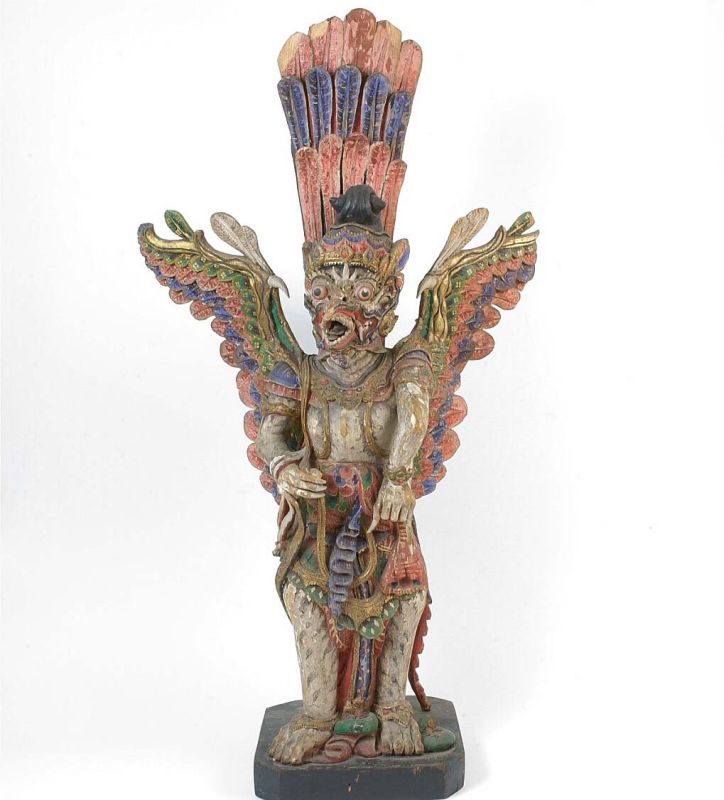
An artifact from Pleyte's collection, now at the Tropenmuseum.

== Early years ==
Pleyte was the son of archaeologist Willem Pleyte, who later became director of the Rijksmuseum van Oudheden; his mother was Catharina Margaretha Templeman van der Hoeven. He spent time at a home on Rapenburg. Pleyte attended Japikse school in Leiden, and the Leiden gymnasium. From 1879 to 1881, Pleyte and his younger brother studied at the Instituut van Kinsbergen in Elburg. He studied in Delft, but did not complete his last year. Although he was admitted to Leiden University, he was not successful with his exams.

== Career ==
Pleyte began to focus on the study of geography and ethnology as an unpaid volunteer at the Rijks Ethnographic Museum, where he started a new layout of the rooms. The new interior was finished in 1883, the same year when the Sixth International Congress of Orientalists was held in Leiden. Along with other students, Pleyte escorted foreign visitors at the conference. He attended lectures by Professors Hoffmann, Schlegel, Van der Pant, and George Alexander Wilken. By 1884, he was an assistant at the Leiden Museum.

In 1886, he attended the Seventh International Oriental Congress in Vienna, as well as the Colonial and Indian Exhibition in London, thus building an international network of acquaintances. In 1887, after disagreements with museum director Lindor Serrurier, Pleyte was hired as curator of the Ethnographisch Museum Artis, where the ethnological collection of the Society Natura Artis Magistra was managed. Besides a guide for the collection, Pleyte wrote during his Amsterdam period a large number of articles in scientific journals. Pleyte's promotion in 1896 to manager of the collection resulted in friction with the management of zoo. He subsequently became a Director of Brill; his father, an Egyptologist, served on the Board as well. In 1897, he developed an eight-volume catalog for the museum with an ethnographic collection of the South Seas. In the same year, he was asked to participate in the colonial exhibition at the Dutch pavilion of the 1900 World Exhibition in Paris. For this, he traveled to the Dutch East Indies, Sumatra, and Bali gathering artifacts, a trip which left a great impression upon him and inspired him to write a number of publications on Indonesian antiquities.

In 1902, he moved to Batavia, where he served as Lecturer on Indonesian Ethnology at the Gymnasium William III, a position he held until 1913. From 1915 until his death in 1917, he taught history and ethnology at the Administration School in Batavia, which trained government officials. In addition, he worked as a curator at the Royal Batavian Society of Arts and Sciences (now the National Museum of Indonesia in Jakarta), where he carried out many changes. According to Professor Raden Pandji Soejono, the most important classification work on neolithic Indonesian adzes was done by Pleyte.

== Personal life ==
Pleyte married Lina Eliza Alice Chavannes; they had six children. He died at the age of 54 due to a severe asthma attack.
