= Hermann von Rosenberg =

German naturalist

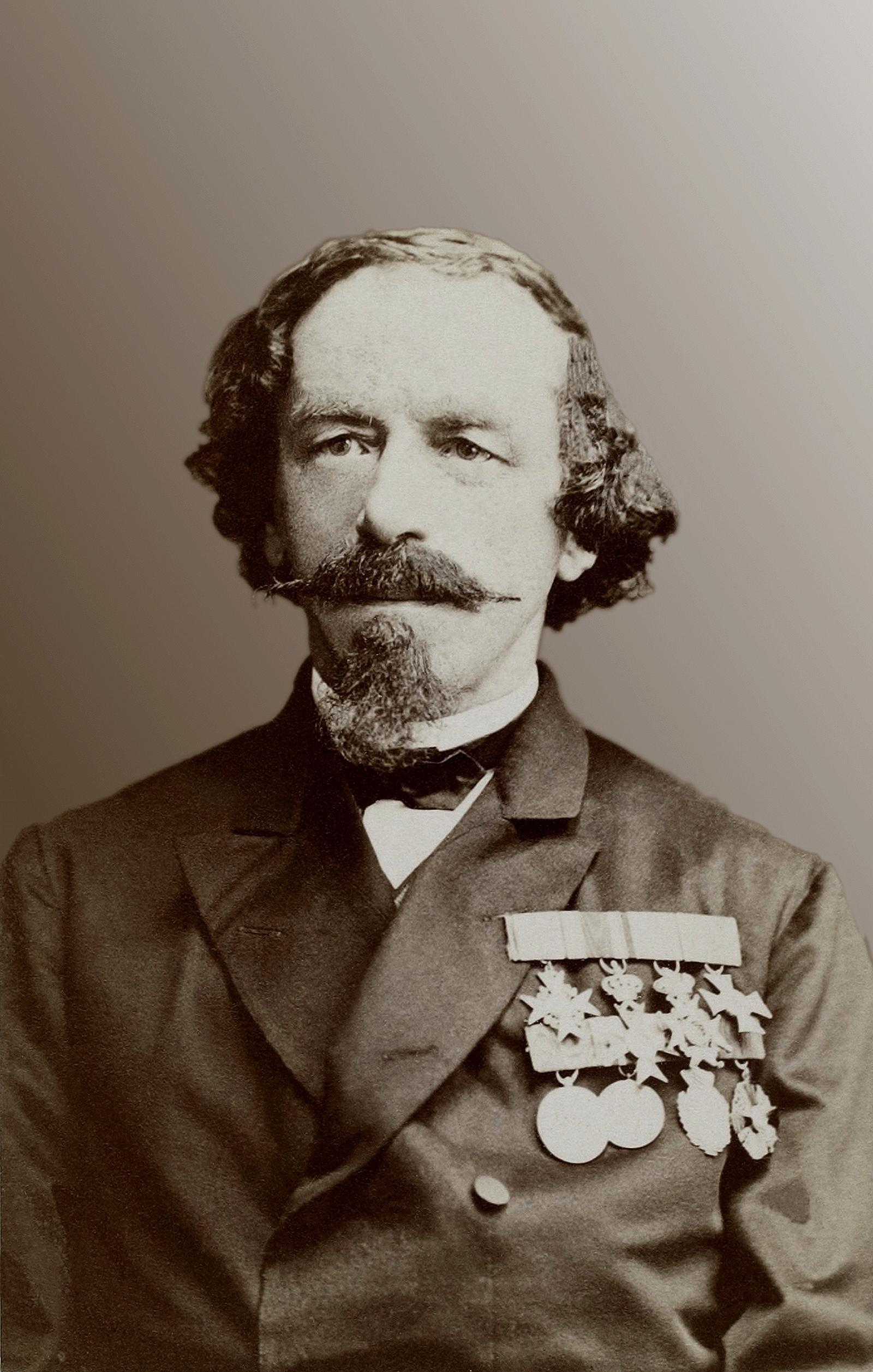

Hermann Karl Benjamin von Rosenberg (April 7, 1817 – November 15, 1888) was a German naturalist born in Darmstadt. He published a few books and several articles concerning his work in the East Indies. In these he describes the geography, zoology, linguistics and ethnography of the islands.

== Biography ==
In late 1839 he enlisted in the Dutch Harderwijk, and soon afterwards was stationed in the Netherlands East Indies as a military cartographer, tasked with making topographical surveys. He spent 30 years of his life working in the East Indies.

From 1840 until 1856, Rosenberg was a topographical draughtsman on Sumatra and its neighboring islands. Afterwards he was a civil servant, working as a cartographer and surveyor in the Moluccas and western New Guinea. He was a member of the Etna expedition. Rosenberg had a keen interest in ornithology, and beginning in the 1860s, collected specimens in the Indies for study and classification by Hermann Schlegel at the natural history museum of Leiden. He returned to Europe in 1871, and died in the Hague, Netherlands in 1888.

== Legacy ==
Rosenberg is commemorated in the scientific name of a species of monitor lizard, Varanus rosenbergi.

== Works ==
Rosenberg's best written effort was the "Der Malayische Archipel. Land und Leute in Schilderungen, gesammelt während eines dreissigjährigen Aufenthaltes in den Kolonien". Here he writes about the famous Javanese garden at Buitenzorg, and describes the artifacts and customs of the people of Sumatra, Celebes, New Guinea and the Moluccas. The illustrations in the book were mostly made from wood-engravings, based on Rosenberg's illustrations made on site.

Alfred Russel Wallace named Rosenberg in his book The Malay Archipelago as "Dutch naturalist", "my friend", "old friend", "a German named Rosenberg", and as a person who gave him support on behalf of the Dutch Colonial Government.
