= Etna expedition =

The Etna expedition (1858) was an early policy-oriented exploration of the then virtually unknown south and north coast of Dutch New Guinea, that can also be regarded as the second Dutch scientific expedition to the main island of New Guinea since 1828.

== Purpose and composition ==
In December 1857, Governor Charles Ferdinand Pahud appointed a Commission to identify appropriate locations on the North- and Southwest coasts of New Guinea to establish a permanent outpost, in replacement of Fort du Bus. The Commission was led by Mr. van der Goes, resident (administrator) of Banda. The other members were captains Georg Roijer and F.G. Beckman, scientist H.J.H. Crockewit and draftsman Hermann von Rosenberg. In addition, Prince Amir of Tidore, who was acquainted with New Guinea, was appointed to the Commission. The expedition was named after its ship, steamship Etna with 128 crewmembers. The Etna left Ambon on March 20, 1858.

== Itinerary ==
The expedition first explored the southwest coast and gave Etna Bay its name. It subsequently went North and explored Cenderawasih Bay near present-day Manokwari. Here it had to wait a month, between mid-May and mid-June, for provisions to arrive. On Mansinam Island the group met Alfred Russel Wallace. The expedition continued eastward and identified present-day Jayapura as the best place to establish an outpost. The post was finally established in 1910.

== Results ==
The hydrographic measurements were of lasting importance. The collected items probably ended up in Ethnographic Museum Artis and seem to have been lost. The Tropenmuseum still has a korwar figure from the 1858 expedition.

== Literature ==
- Croockewit, H..H., "Oppervlakkige geognostische schets der bezochte punten op de Zuidwest- en Noordkusten van N.Guinea", in: Tijdschrift voor de Taal-, Land- en Volkenkunde van Nederlandsch-Indië 1862, pp. 131–144.
- Duuren, D. van, "An old korwar from New Guinea in Amsterdam's Tropenmuseum", in: Tribal- the magazine of tribal art IX-1, nr. 34, Spring 2004, pp. 110–113.
- Goes, H.D.A.G. van der, e.a., Nieuw-Guinea; ethnographisch en natuurkundig onderzocht en beschreven in 1858 door een Nederlandsch Indische Commissie. Amsterdam, 1862.
- Roijer, G., "Reis van Amboina naar de Zuidwest- en Noordkust van Nieuw-Guinea", in: Verhandelingen en Berichten betrekkelijk het Zeewezen 21, 1861, pp. 341–404; 22, 1862, pp. 75–94.
- Rosenberg, C.B.H. von, "Reis naar Nieuw-Guinea in 1858", in: Natuurkundig Tijdschrift voor Nederlandsch-Indië 19, 1859, pp. 399–422.
- Vlasblom, D., Papoea, een geschiedenis. Amsterdam: Mets & Schilt, 2004.
- Wallace, Alfred Russel, Het Maleise eilandenrijk (oorspr. The Malay Archipelago, London 1869). Amsterdam/Antwerpen: Atlas, 1996.
