= Willem Pleyte =

Dutch Egyptologist and museum director

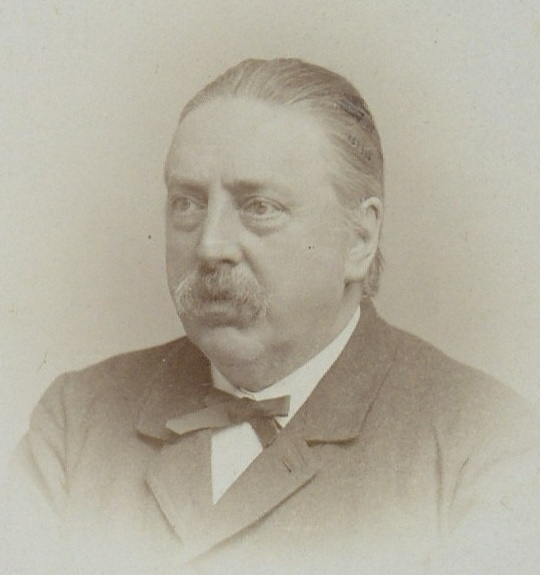
- Willem Pleyte
- Born: 26 June 1836; Hillegom
- Died: 11 March 1903 (aged 66); Leiden
- Education: Utrecht University
- Known for: Chapitres supplémentaires du Livre des Morts
- Awards: Knight of the Order of the Netherlands Lion
- Scientific career
- Fields: Archaeology; Egyptology
- Workplaces: Rijksmuseum van Oudheden

Dr. Willem Pleyte (26 June 1836 – 11 March 1903) was a Dutch Egyptologist and museum director.

== Family ==
Willem Pleyte was the son of Cornelius Marinus Pleyte. He was born on 26 June 1836 in Hillegom, where his father was a pastor.

== Education ==
He attended the French school in Loenen (which was not very highly regarded) from 1840. He was then sent to the Gymnasium Bommel, where his uncle was the rector where he studied up to 1855. From 1855 to 1860, Pleyte studied theology at the Opzoomer college of Utrecht University. He found the subject of theology to his liking and did well in his studies. In 1860, he completed his education successfully.

== Career ==
He hoped to follow in the footsteps of his father and started his career from 1860 in church council of Gelderland and he found the job of a preacher not to his liking. During this time, for two years, he also ventured into scientific research in theology and started writing articles and publishing them in journals; the first article was "The Book of Noah “ and the others were "the Ascension of the Prophet Jesus", and “the Removal of Moses” and published them in journals. He then started research on Egyptology, a subject still in its infancy with very few well known experts in the field such as Rouge, Lepsius, Brugsch and others. From 1862 to 1892, he also wrote several publications for which he was criticized, such as "La religion pre-Israelite; Recherches sur le dieu Set" (1865). He was dispirited by this critique but continued to write. His next work was on "Lettre à Monsieur Théodule Deveria sur quelques monuments relatifs au Dieu Set" which refers to monuments, their locations and worship practices of gods with many names of the northern and southern nations.

He then wrote a few articles on the value of various hieroglyphics and the numerals in Egyptian in "Zeitschrift fur Aegyptische Sprache und Alterthumskunde" which were well received. his" Etudes Égyptologiques' the attention.

A notable work of Pleyte was in 1868, when he wrote an article for "Etudes Égyptologiques" in which he gave a translation and commentary of the hieratic text on the verso of Papyrus Leiden I 348. This book proved his erudition in Egyptology. The subject of this text is a collection of spells against various diseases. The 'Etudes' begins with a translation and commentary of a text on the verso of Papyrus I 348, which is now preserved in the Rijksmuseum van Oudheden. He also commented on the Book of the Dead, number 125, comparing 40 papyri from Leiden and Paris. Pleyte also studied the papyri in the Museo Egizio in Turin. Between 1869 and 1876, he and museum curator Francesco Rossi (curator) published Papyrus de Turin, making a part of the large papyri collection of the Regio Museo di Antichita di Torino available to others.

In his last major work Chapitres supplémentaires du Livre des Morts 162–174 (1881–1882), he translated and analyzed different parts of the Book of the Dead. The discovery that the Leiden and london papyri originally formed one manuscript is attributed to Pleyte, as he recognized the handwriting to be the same. The work was published however, by Professor Hess from Freiburg in 1892.

Starting in 1869, Pleyte applied for the curator position at the "archaeological cabinet" (Rijksmuseum van Oudheden); earlier he had been invited only as a volunteer. Even though there was opposition from the Director Conradus Leemans, Pleyte appointment as conservator was approved by the Minister on 11 January 1869 and he took charge on 1 February 1869. Before his appointment as curator, he had visited the Museum at Turin where he found that a large number of hieratic papyri were organized scientifically. On his return from Turin, he made a proposal to Rossi, the curator of the Museum to organize the papyri in a scientific way in the museum where he worked. Pleyte was not put in charge of the Egyptian section, rather he was given the Classic and Dutch sections. After Leemans retired in 1891, Pleyte became the director of the RMO, where he made many improvements. He reorganized the drawings, he created space to study, and he made a significant expansion to the library. Not long after his appointment as director, Pleyte began to suffer from rheumatism and his wife who had a great influence on his life died in 1895. In January 1903, he resigned. Only a few weeks later, on March 11, he died at the age 66. Pleyte was the father of the Indologist and museum curator, Cornelis Marinus Pleyte. They both served on the board of Brill.

== Honours ==
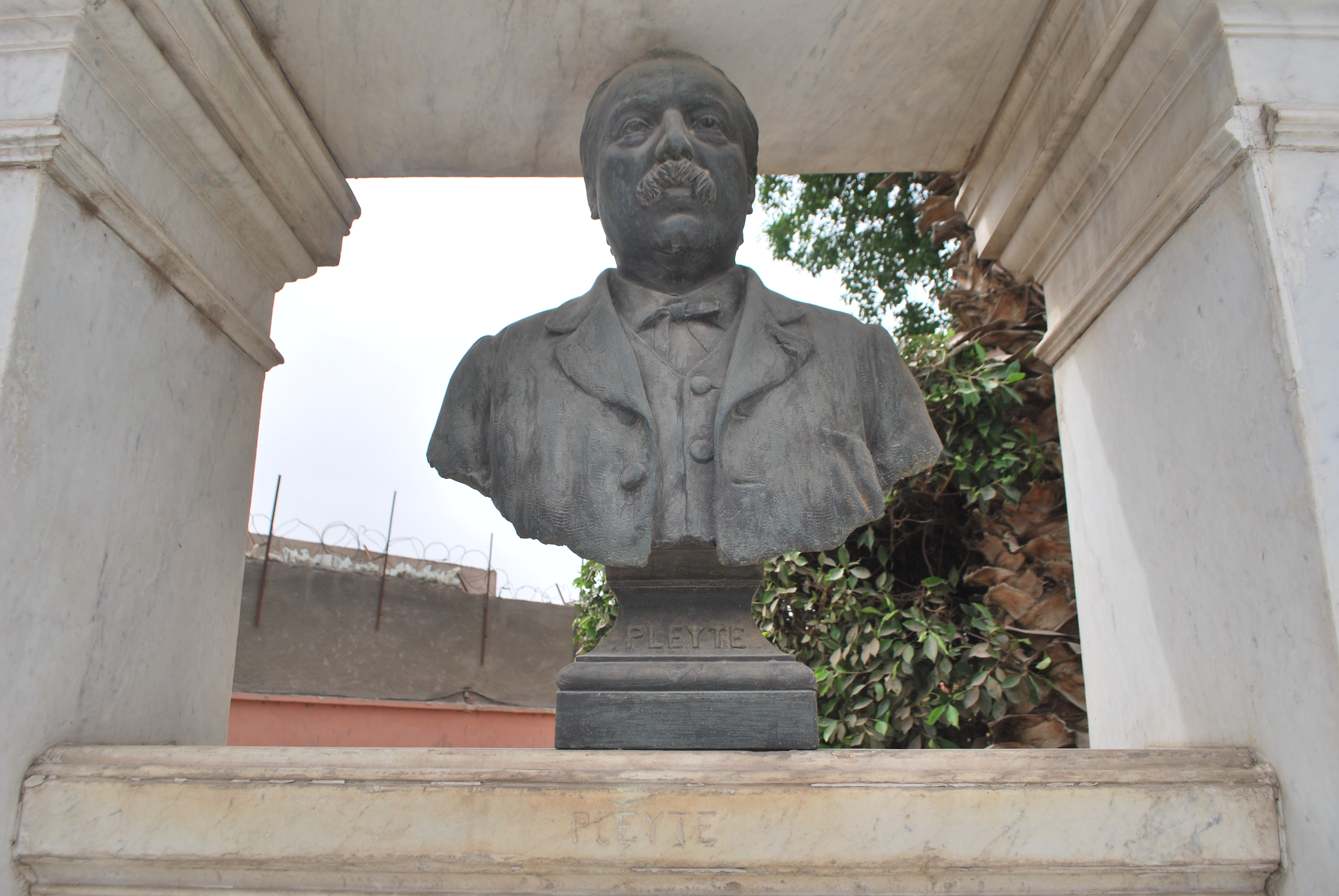
Bust of Willem Pleyte (part of funerary monument Auguste Mariette in Cairo)

In March 1871, the Italian government honoured him with the Order of the Crown of Italy. In 1875, the Senate of the Leyden University promoted him as Doctor Honoris causa in Literature. In 1882, he was appointed as a member of the Royal Netherlands Academy of Arts and Sciences. On 31 August 1898, he was decorated with the Knight of the Order of the Netherlands Lion. He was a member of several national and international societies. As one of the leading specialists in hieratic of his time, a portrait bust of Willem Pleyte was included in the funerary monument for Auguste Mariette in the garden of the Egyptian Museum in Cairo.

== Family life ==
Pleyte married Catharina Margaretha Templeman van Hoeven (23 August 1839 – 15 March 1895) on 8 August 1862. The couple had ten children, six of whom reached adulthood. Notable are Thomas Bastiaan Pleyte (23 October 1864 – 25 March 1926; lawyer and politician) and Cornelis Marinus Pleyte (24 June 1863 – 22 July 1917; Dutch East Indies ethnologist and museum curator).

== Selected works ==
- 1862: La religion des Pré-Israélites. Recherches sur le dieu Seth, dissertation Leiden University. Revised edition published in 1865 by Hooiberg et Fils, Leiden.
- 1865: Catalogue raisonnée de types égyptiens hiératiques de la fonderie de N. Tetterode à Amsterdam, Leiden: E.J. Brill.
- 1866: Études Égyptologiques I: Étude sur un rouleau magique du musée de Leide, Leiden: E.J. Brill.
- 1868: Les Papyrus Rollin, de la Bibliothèque Impériale de Paris, Leiden: E.J. Brill.
- 1869-1876 (with F. Rossi): Papyrus de Turin, 2 vols., Leiden: E.J. Brill.
- 1874 (with Jan Pieterssoon Dou; Salomon Davidsson van Dulmanhorst): Leiden vóór 300 jaren en thans. Photolithographische afbeelding van een platte-grond van 1578, en chromolithographische afbeelding van het chaertbouc van straten binnen deser Stadt Leyden, Leiden: E.J. Brill.
- 1877-1903: Nederlandsche oudheden van de vroegste tijden tot op Karel den Groote. Afbeeldingen naar de oorspronkelijke voorwerpen of naar photographiën met begeleidende tekst en oudheidkundige kaart. I: Tekst; II: Platen; [III:] Carte archéologique de la Néerlande. Oudheidkundige kaart van Nederland, Leiden: E.J. Brill.
- 1879: Études Égyptologiques III: L'épistolographie égyptienne, Leiden (unfinished).
- 1879 (with P. du Rieu jr.): Catalogus van het Stedelijk Museum te Leiden, Leiden.
- 1881: Chapitres supplémentaires du Livre des morts 162 à 174 publiés d'après les Monuments de Leide, du Louvre et du Musée Britannique, Leiden: E.J. Brill.

== See also ==
- List of ancient Egyptian papyri
