= Melchior van Santvoort =

Dutch sailor who travelled to Japan (c. 1570 – 1641)

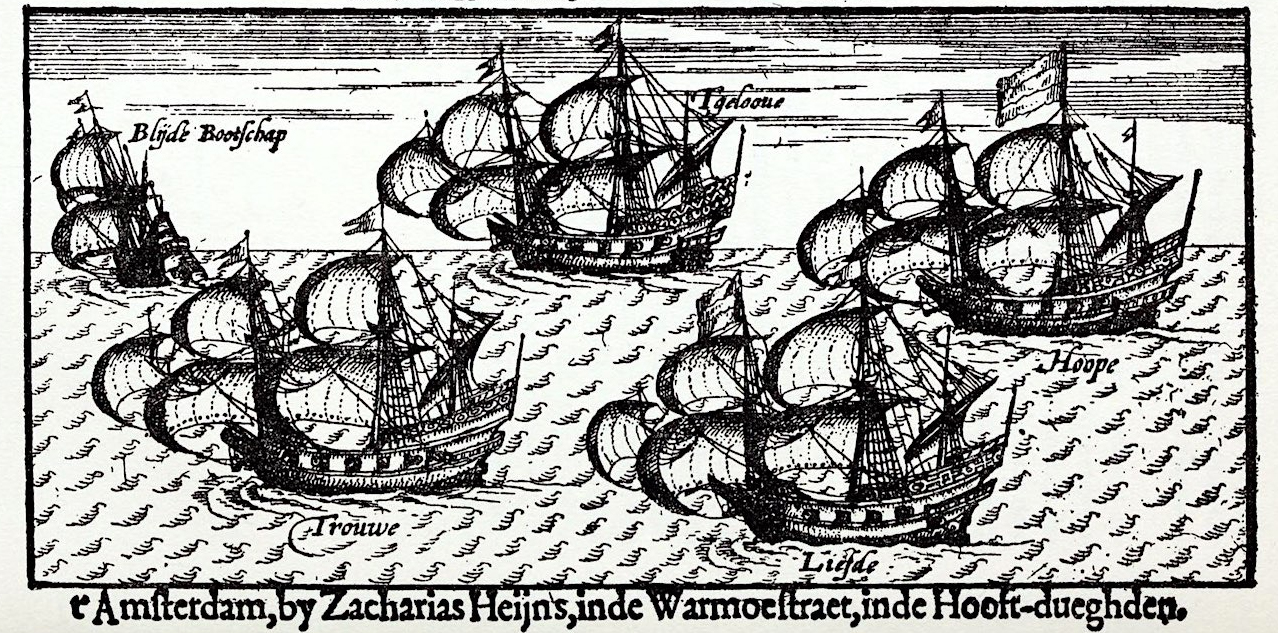
From left to right: "Blijde Boodschap", "Trouwe", "'t Geloove", "Liefde" and "Hoope". 17th-century engraving.

Melchior van Santvoort (c. 1570 – 1641) was one of the first Dutchmen in Japan, was a purser on the Dutch ship De Liefde, which was stranded in Japan in 1600. Some of his shipmates were Jacob Quaeckernaeck, Jan Joosten, and William Adams. Van Santvoort remained in Japan, where he spent 39 years as a merchant in Nagasaki.

De Liefde (the Love, sometimes translated as the Charity) departed Rotterdam in 1598, on a trading voyage that was a five ship expedition to the East Indies. After making it through the Straits of Magellan, they became separated, but later rejoined the Hoop (Hope) off the coast of Chile, where some of the crew and captains of both vessels lost their lives in an encounter with natives. They decide to leave hostile Spanish waters and sell their woolen cloth cargo in Japan rather than in the warmer Moluccas. The two ships encountered a storm and Hoop was lost. With a decimated and sick crew (only 24 were still alive, and several were dying) the damaged De Liefde made landfall off Bungo (present-day Usuki) on the coast of Kyūshū in April 1600. Portuguese Jesuit missionary priests claimed that the ship was a pirate vessel and that the crew should be executed. The ship was seized on orders of Tokugawa Ieyasu, the daimyō of Edo (Tokyo) and the future shōgun, and later the crew was ordered to sail her to Sakai (near Osaka) and then on to Edo. Some of them were received by Tokugawa Ieyasu, who questioned them at length on European politics, wars and foreign affairs. The crew eventually went separate ways when some decided they should split the money provided as compensation for their losses of the ship and cargo. The nineteen bronze cannons were unloaded from the ship and, according to Spanish accounts, later used at the decisive Battle of Sekigahara on 21 October 1600 (between Tokogawa forces and their rivals).

Van Santvoort was allowed to leave Japan with De Liefde's Captain Jacob Quaeckernaeck in 1604 on a Red Seal Ship, provided by the daimyō of Hirado, for Pattani in the Malay Peninsula. They had letters from the Japanese with an invitation for the Dutch to come trade. At Pattani, Quaeckernaeck joined the fleet of Cornelis Matelief de Jonge, his compatriot and relative, on 19 August 1606. Quaeckernaeck died however in a naval engagement when Matelief destroyed the Portuguese armada near Malacca on 21 September 1606.

The head of the Pattani Dutch trading post, Victor Sprinckel, initially refused to take up the offer of trade with Japan since he was too busy dealing with Portuguese opposition in Southeast Asia. Van Santvoort was only able to return to Japan in 1609, in the company of Jacques Specx, a Dutch merchant with a cargo he wished to sell in Hirado. Once they arrived van Santvoort served as interpreter. He assisted the Dutch East India Company (Vereenigde Oostindische Compagnie, VOC) envoys, Abraham van den Brock and Nicolas Puyck during their diplomatic mission to visit the Shōgun in Sumpu and in Edo. At Edo William Adams, van Santvoort's former shipmate and a hatamoto (samurai who was a direct retainer of the Shōgun), negotiated on behalf of the emissaries. The mission was well received and resulted in permission to establish a trading post in Hirado.

Van Santvoort together with another former crewmember of De Liefde, Jan Joosten (also a hatamoto), reportedly made a fortune in trade between Japan and Southeast Asia. Both of them were reported by Dutch traders in the Ayutthaya Kingdom (Siam), onboard richly cargoed junks, in early 1613. Van Santvoort was also reported to have married “Isabella” a Japanese woman, the daughter of a carpenter. Van Santvoort's daughters married Pieter van Santen, Christy Villanueva, and Willem Verstegen.

Van Santvoort operated his business in Nagasaki, but continued to maintain close contact with his compatriots in Hirado. However, the rule of Shōgun Tokugawa Hidetada and his son, Tokugawa Iemitsu was increasingly hostile to foreign contact. Christianity was banned in 1614, and from 1634 the Dutch traders came into conflict with Chinese merchants in Nagasaki. In 1639, an order came from the Shōgun that (with the exception of the VOC merchants at Dejima) all Europeans, their Japanese spouses, and any half-Japanese children were to be expelled from Japan. Van Santvoort left for Formosa (Taiwan) then went on to Batavia. Willem Verstegen married his daughter on Taiwan while on their way to Batavia. Melchior van Santvoort died in Batavia in 1641.
