= Jacques Specx =

Governor-general of the Dutch East Indies

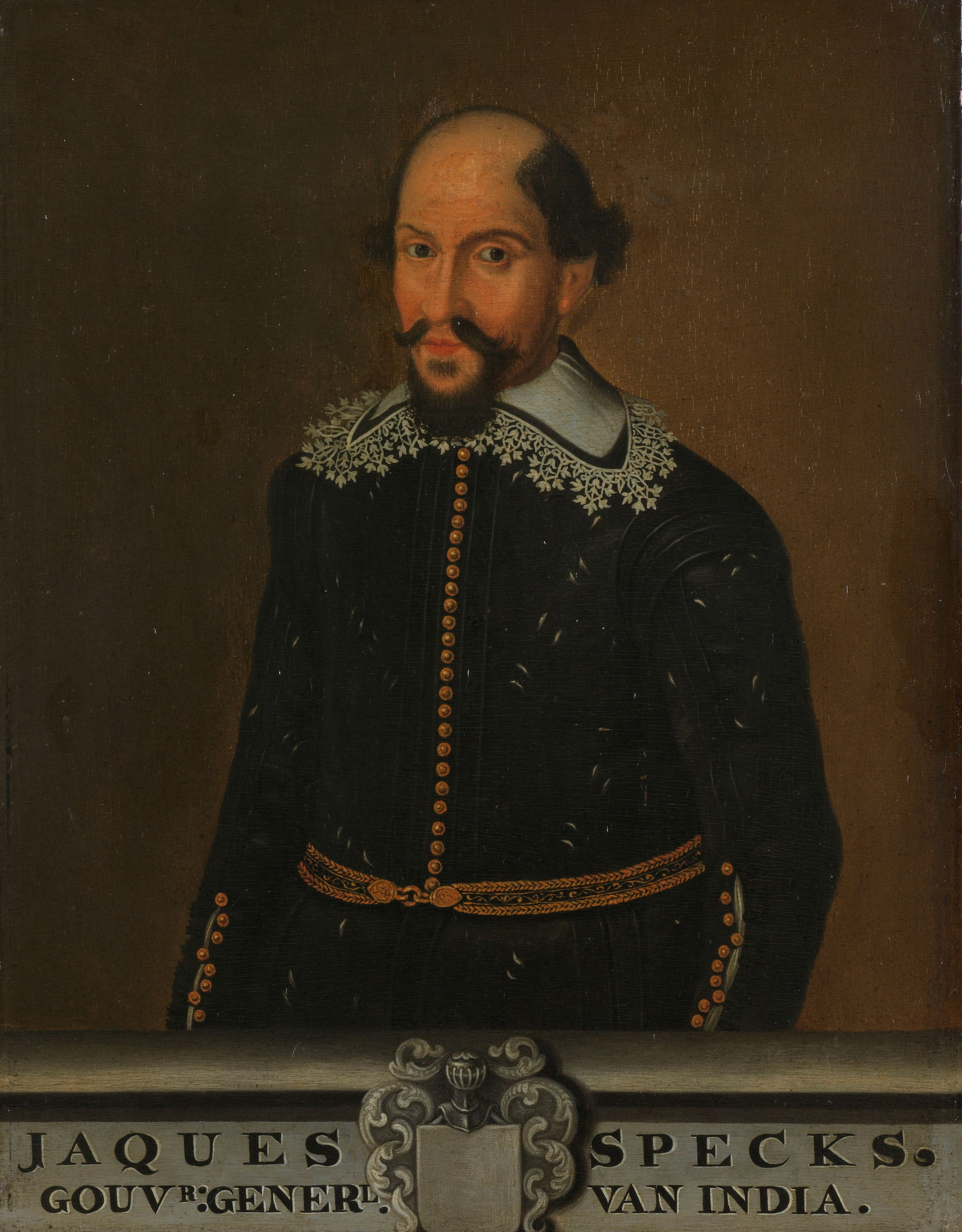
- Anonymous portrait

Governor-General of the Dutch East Indies
- In office 22 September 1629 – 17 April 1632
- Preceded by: Jan Pieterszoon Coen
- Succeeded by: Hendrik Brouwer

Personal details
- Born: Unknown date, 1588 Dordrecht, Dutch Republic
- Died: 22 July 1652 (aged 63–64) Amsterdam, Dutch Republic

Jacques Specx (Dutch: [ʑɑk ˈspɛks]; 1585 – 22 July 1652) was a Dutch merchant, who founded the trade on Japan and Korea in 1609. Jacques Specx received the support of William Adams to obtain extensive trading rights from Tokugawa Ieyasu, the shōgun emeritus, on 24 August 1609, which allowed him to establish a trading factory in Hirado on 20 September 1609. He was the interim governor in Batavia between 1629 and 1632. There his daughter Saartje Specx was involved in a scandal. Back home in Holland Specx became an art-collector.

The Dutch, who, rather than "Nanban" were called "Kōmō" (紅毛, "Red Hair") by the Japanese, first arrived in Japan in 1600, on board the Liefde.

In 1605, two of the Liefde's crew, Jacob Quaeckernaeck and Melchior van Santvoort, were sent to Pattani by Tokugawa Ieyasu, to invite Dutch trade to Japan. The head of the Pattani Dutch trading post, Victor Sprinckel, refused on the ground that he was too busy dealing with Portuguese opposition in Southeast Asia.

== 1609 mission to Japan ==
Jacques Specx, the brother of Cornelius Specx, sailed on a fleet of eleven ships that left Texel in 1607 under the command of Pieter Willemsz Verhoeff. After arriving in Bantam two ships which were dispatched to establish the first official trade relations between the Netherlands and Japan.

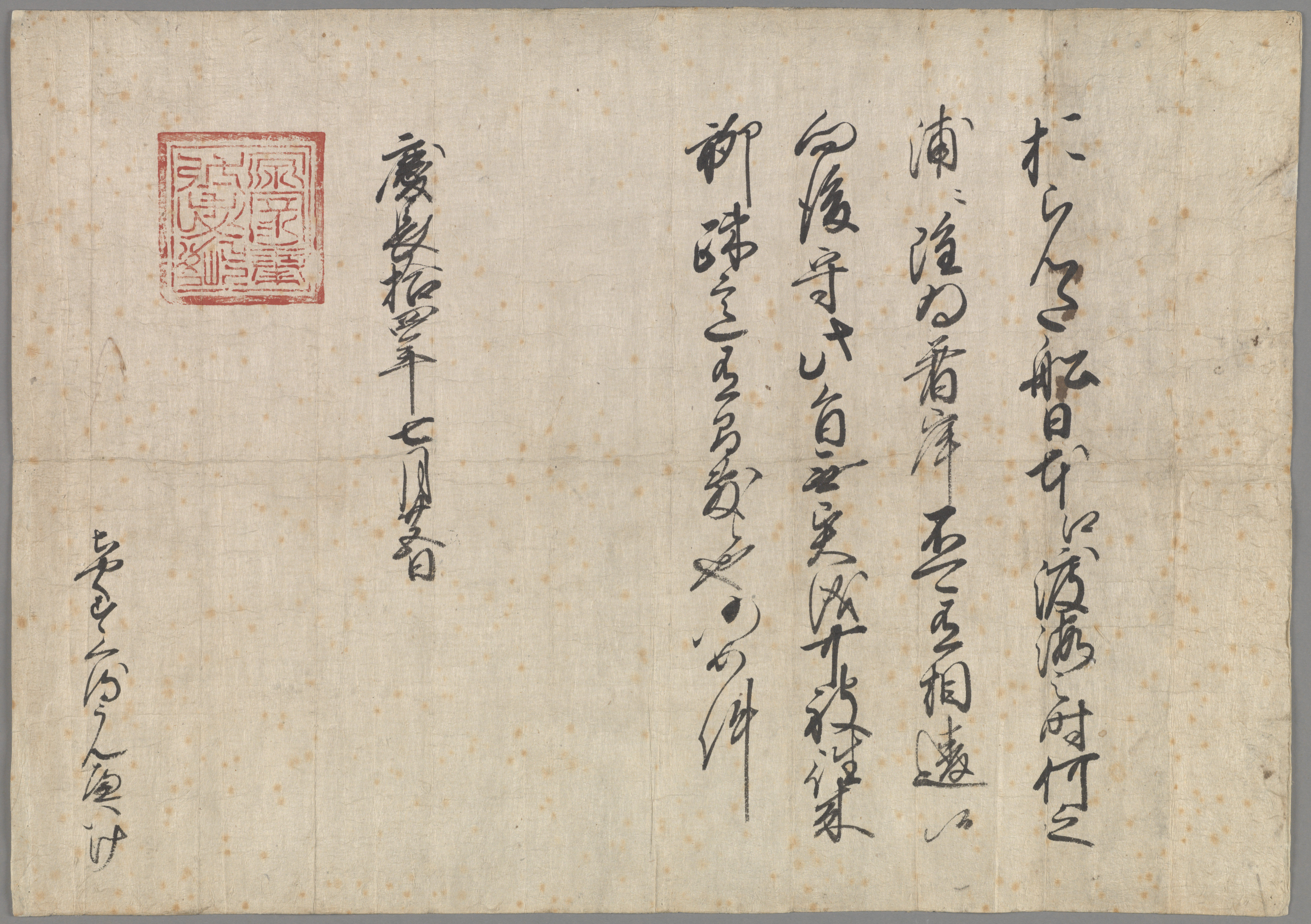
The "trade pass" (Dutch: handelspas) issued in the name of Tokugawa Ieyasu. The text commands: "Dutch ships are allowed to travel to Japan, and they can disembark on any coast, without any reserve. From now on this regulation must be observed, and the Dutch left free to sail where they want throughout Japan. No offenses to them will be allowed, such as on previous occasions" – dated 24 August 1609 (Keichō 14, 25th day of the 6th month); n.b., the goshuin (御朱印) identifies this as an official document bearing the shōgun's scarlet seal.

The two ships Specx commanded were De Griffioen (the "Griffin", 19 cannons) and Roode Leeuw met Pijlen (the "Red lion with arrows", 400 tons, 26 cannons). The ships arrived in Japan on 2 July 1609.

Among the crews were the chief merchants Abraham van den Broeck and Nicolaas Puyck and the under-merchant Jaques Specx.

The exact composition of the delegation is uncertain; but it has been established that van den Broeck and Puyck traveled to the Shogunal Court, and Melchior van Santvoort acted as the mission's interpreter. Santevoort had arrived a few years earlier aboard the Dutch ship De Liefde. He had established himself as a merchant in Nagasaki.

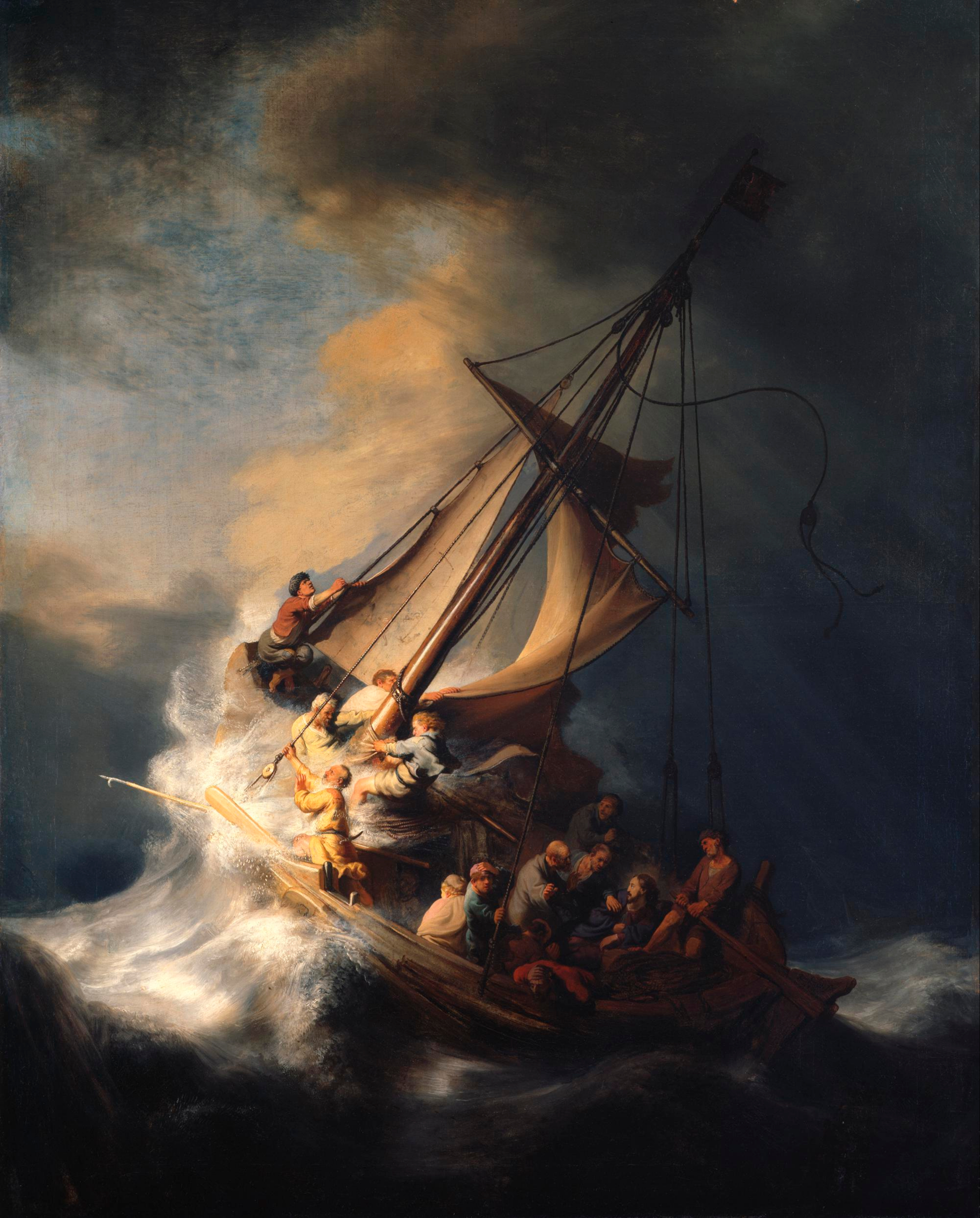
Christ in the storm on the lake Genesareth; by Rembrandt (1633) 160 × 127 cm. In 1990 the painting was stolen from the Isabella Stewart Gardner Museum and has not been recovered; it belonged to Jacques Specx in 1651

The shōgun granted the Dutch the access to all ports in Japan, and confirmed this in an act of safe-conduct, stamped with his red seal. (Inv.nr.1a.).

In September 1609 the ship's council decided to hire a house on Hirado island (west of the southern main island Kiushu). Jacques Specx became the first opperhoofd (chief) of the new company's factory.

In 1610, Specx sent a ship to Korea.

== Gallery ==
Specx owned five paintings by Rembrandt.
