= Jacob Quaeckernaeck =

Dutch sailor who travelled to Japan (c. 1543 – 1606)

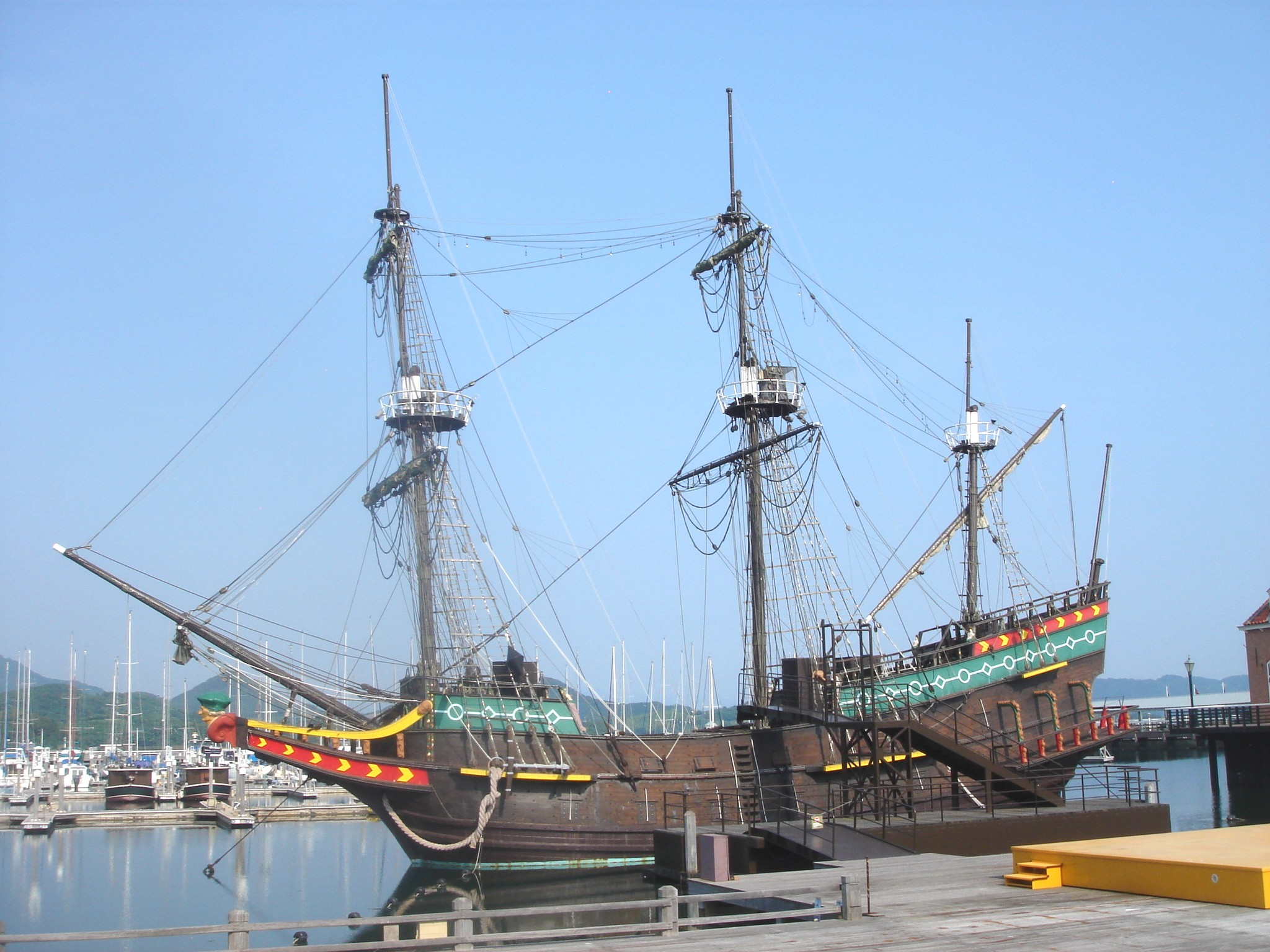
Replica of De Liefde at Huis Ten Bosch Park, Sasebo, Nagasaki Prefecture, Japan.

Jacob Jansz. Quaeckernaeck (or Quackernaeck or Kwakernaak) (ca. 1543 – 22 October 1606) was a native of Rotterdam and one of the first Dutchmen in Japan. He was a navigator and later the captain (after the death of the previous captain in the Strait of Magellan) of the Dutch ship De Liefde, which was stranded in Japan in 1600. Some of his shipmates were Melchior van Santvoort, Jan Joosten and William Adams.

After this event, Japan opened its doors to trading with Europeans, and after most foreigners were expelled from the islands, the Dutch were allowed to stay and continue trading, along with their largest private enterprise, the Dutch East India Company, and its representatives.

De Liefde (the Love, sometimes translated as the Charity) departed Rotterdam in 1598, on a trading voyage that was a five ship expedition to the East Indies. After making it through the Strait of Magellan, they became separated, but later rejoined the Hoop (Hope) off the coast of Chile, where some of the crew and captains of both vessels lost their lives in an encounter with natives. They decided to leave hostile Spanish waters and sell their woolen cloth cargo in Japan rather than in the warmer Moluccas. The two ships encountered a storm and Hoop was lost. With a decimated and sick crew (only 24 were still alive, and several were dying) the damaged De Liefde made landfall off Bungo (present-day Usuki) on the coast of Kyūshū in April 1600. Portuguese Jesuit missionary priests claimed that the ship was a pirate vessel and that the crew should be executed. The ship was seized on orders of Tokugawa Ieyasu, the daimyō of Edo (Tokyo) and the future shōgun, and later the crew was ordered to sail her to Sakai (near Osaka) and then on to Edo. Some of them were received by Tokugawa Ieyasu, who questioned them at length on European politics, wars and foreign affairs. The crew eventually went separate ways when some decided they should split the money provided as compensation for their losses of the ship and cargo. The nineteen bronze cannons were unloaded from the ship and, according to Spanish accounts, later used at the decisive Battle of Sekigahara on 21 October 1600 (between Tokugawa forces and their rivals).

Quaeckernaeck was allowed to leave Japan with another former crewman of De Liefde, Melchior van Santvoort, in 1604 on a Red Seal Ship provided by the daimyō of Hirado, for Pattani in the Malay Peninsula. They had letters from the Japanese with an invitation for the Dutch to come trade. At Pattani, Quaeckernaeck joined the fleet of Cornelis Matelief de Jonge, a compatriot and relative, on 19 August 1606. Quaeckernaeck died however in a naval engagement when Matelief destroyed the Portuguese armada near Malacca, on 22 October 1606.

Melchior van Santvoort later returned to Japan from Pattani, and continued being active in trade between Japan and Southeast Asia.
