= Cornelius Specx =

Cornelis Specx (15?? - 11 June 1608), the brother of Jacques Specx, is known as a European who interacted with the Thai court.

In 1601 he sailed under Joris van Spilbergen to Aceh. The journey was organised by Balthazar de Moucheron. Specx became a bookkeeper of the Dutch East India Company in 1603. In June 1604 he was sent by Admiral Wijbrand van Warwijck to Siam with presents for king Naresuan, hoping to get access to China with Siamese help. He established a trading post ("factory") in Ayutthaya in 1604.

An embassy of five people from the Kingdom of Siam was sent by the following Siamese ruler, Ekathotsarot. and brought to Holland by Admiral Cornelis Matelieff de Jonge onboard Orange, who had left Bantam on 28 January 1608. A few precious stones, taken on board by Specx, disappeared. The embassy arrived in The Hague on 10 September 1608, and met with Maurice of Nassau, Prince of Orange.

Specx died during the journey. His goods were sold before the mast.
