= William Adams (samurai) =

English sailor and samurai (1564–1620)

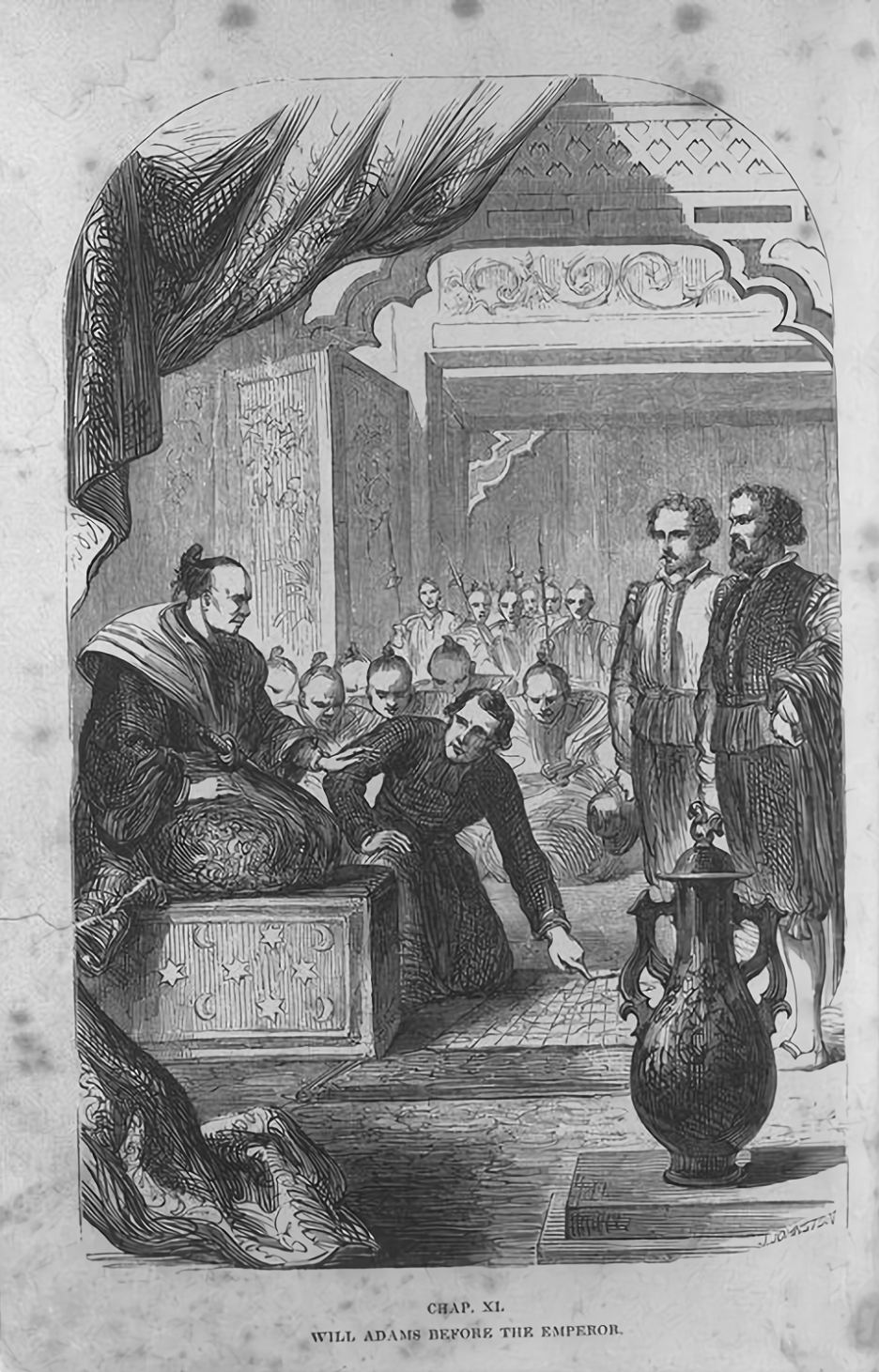
- William Adams before Shogun Tokugawa Ieyasu, in a 19th century illustration
- Born: 24 September 1564; Gillingham, Kent, Kingdom of England
- Died: 16 May 1620 (aged 55); Hirado, Nagasaki, Tokugawa Shogunate
- Resting place: William Adams Memorial Park, Sakigata Hill, Hirado, Nagasaki Prefecture, Japan
- Other name: Miura Anjin (三浦按針)
- Occupation: Navigator
- Known for: First Englishman to travel to Japan; Among the first known Western Hatamoto; One of the first Englishmen to travel to Thailand Third Englishman to travel to Vietnam
- Term: 1600–1620
- Successor: Joseph Adams
- Spouses: Mary Hyn (m. 1589) Oyuki (m. 1613)
- Children: John Adams (son); Deliverance Adams (daughter); Joseph Adams (son); Susanna Adams (daughter)

William Adams (24 September 1564 – 16 May 1620), better known in Japan as Miura Anjin (三浦按針; 'the pilot of Miura'), was an English navigator who, in 1600, became the first Englishman to reach Japan. He was later granted hatamoto status, (Note: Henry Smith argued there is not much evidence about His 250 koku fief. Thus Smith argued Adams's status as samurai was more "honorary".) and was recognised as one of the most influential foreigners in Japan during the early 17th century.

He arrived in Japan as one of the few survivors of the ship Liefde under the leadership of Jacob Quaeckernaeck. It was the only vessel to reach Japan from a five-ship expedition launched by a company of Rotterdam merchants (a voorcompagnie, or predecessor, of the Dutch East India Company). Soon after his arrival in Japan, Adams and his second mate Jan Joosten became advisors to shōgun Tokugawa Ieyasu.

Among Adams's legacies was his promotion of a policy of religious intolerance aimed particularly at Catholics, which later developed into a centuries-long policy of religious persecution directed primarily against Europeans and Christians of all denominations, eventually extending to Japanese converts as well. He also influenced the development of Japan's isolationist sakoku policy, under which interactions with other countries were severely restricted, almost all foreign nationals were barred from entering Japan, and Japanese commoners were prohibited from leaving the country.

For more than a decade, the Tokugawa authorities did not allow Adams and Joosten to leave Japan. Although he was eventually granted permission to return to England, Adams chose to remain in Japan, where he died at the age of 55. His Japan-born children, Joseph and Susanna, were likely expelled to Batavia in 1635, when Tokugawa Iemitsu closed Japan to foreign trade; after that, they disappear from the historical record.

== Early life ==
Adams was born in Gillingham, Kent, England in 1564. His father died when he was twelve, and he was apprenticed to shipyard owner Master Nicholas Diggins at Limehouse for the seafaring life. He spent the next twelve years learning shipbuilding, astronomy, and navigation before entering the Royal Navy.

== Naval service ==
With England at war with Spain, Adams served in the Royal Navy under Sir Francis Drake. He saw naval service against the Spanish Armada in 1588 as master of the Richarde Dyffylde, a resupply ship carrying ammunition and food for the English fleet. It was unclear whether Adams's role during the battle was resupplying ships from the rear or fighting on the frontline. After the victorious battle, the Queen's fleet disbanded, and its sailors lost their jobs, including Adams. Later, he sought a new job in Wor'll Company of Barbary Marchauntes, or better known as Barbary Company. During this service, Jesuit sources claim he took part in an expedition to the Arctic that lasted about two years, in search of a Northeast Passage along the coast of Siberia to the Far East. (Note: However, the veracity of this Jesuit claims was doubted by modern historian Thomas Rundall, as the said Jesuit did not mention such expedition in his autobiographical letter which written during his time in Japan; its wording implies that the 1598 voyage was his first involvement with the Dutch. The Jesuit source may have misattributed to Adams a claim by one of the Dutch members of Jacques Mahu's crew who had been on Jan Rijp's ship during the voyage that discovered Spitsbergen.)

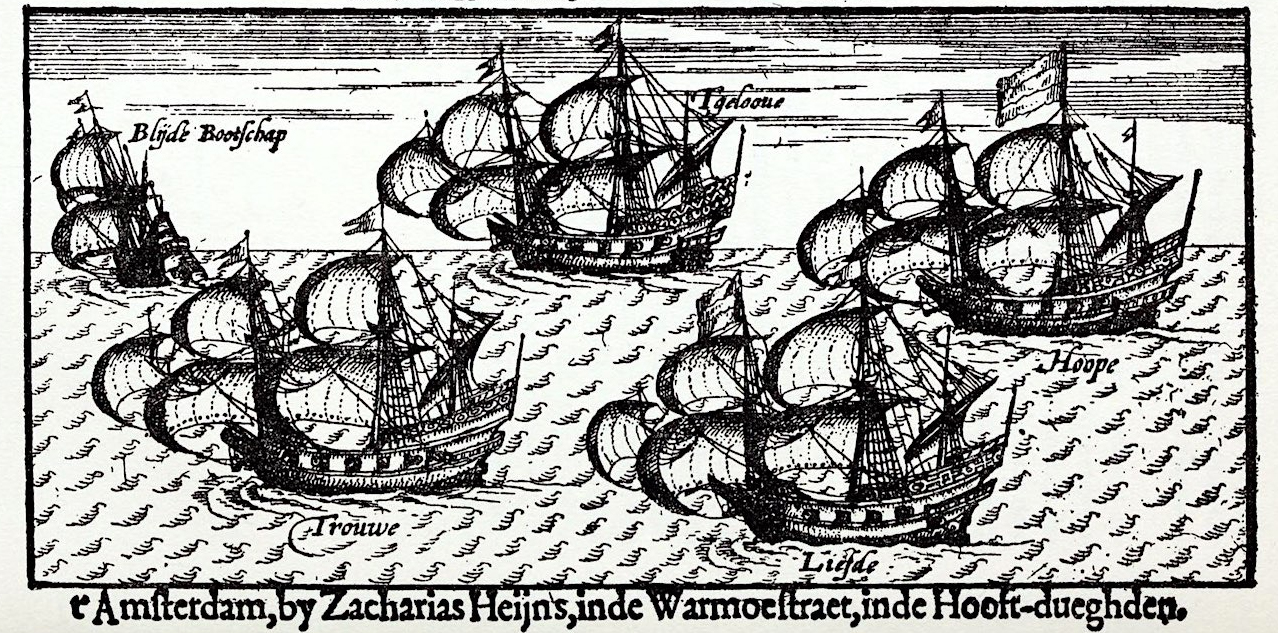
17th-century engraving. From left to right, Blijde Boodschap, Trouw, Geloof, Liefde and Hoop

I am a Kentish-man, borne in a Towne called Gillingham, two English miles from Rochester, one mile from Chattam, where the Kings ships lye: and that from the age of twelve yeares, I was brought up in Lime-house neere London, being Prentise twelve yeares to one Master Nicholas Diggines, and have served in the place of Master and Pilot in her Majesties ships, and about eleven or twelve yeares served the Worshipfull Company of the Barbarie Marchants, untill the Indian Trafficke from Holland began, in which Indian Trafficke I was desirous to make a little experience of the small knowledge which God had given me. So, in the yeare of our Lord God, 1598. I was hired for chiefe Pilot of a Fleete of five sayle, which was made readie by the chiefe of the Indian Company Peter Vanderhag, and Hance Vanderueke...

— William Adams letter, 22 October 1611

Adams's fleet consisted of:

- Hoop ("Hope"), led by Admiral Jacques Mahu (d. 1598), who was succeeded by Simon de Cordes (d. 1599) and Simon de Cordes Jr; this ship was lost near the Hawaiian Islands;
- Liefde ("Love"), led by Simon de Cordes, second in command, succeeded by Gerrit van Beuningen, and finally under Jacob Quaeckernaeck; this was the only ship to reach Japan;
- Geloof ("Faith"), led by Gerrit van Beuningen and in the end, Sebald de Weert; this was the only ship that returned to Rotterdam;
- Trouw ("Loyalty"), led by Jurriaan van Boekhout (d. 1599) and finally, Baltazar de Cordes; this ship was captured in Tidore;
- Blijde Boodschap ("Good Tiding" or "The Gospel"), led by Sebald de Weert, and later, Dirck Gerritz, was seized in Valparaíso.

Jacques Mahu and Simon de Cordes were the leaders of an expedition with the goal to reach Chile, Peru and other kingdoms in New Spain such as Nueva Galicia, the Captaincy General of Guatemala, Nueva Vizcaya, the New Kingdom of León and Santa Fe de Nuevo México. The fleet's original mission was to go to South America's western coast and trade their cargo for silver, then head to Japan only if the original mission failed. The crews were supposed to obtain silver in Japan and spices in Moluccas before returning home. Their goal was to sail through the Strait of Magellan to get to their destination, which scared many sailors because of the harsh weather conditions.

The first major expedition around South America was organised by a voorcompagnie, the Rotterdam or Magelhaen Company. It organised two fleets of five and four ships with 750 sailors and soldiers, including 30 English musicians.

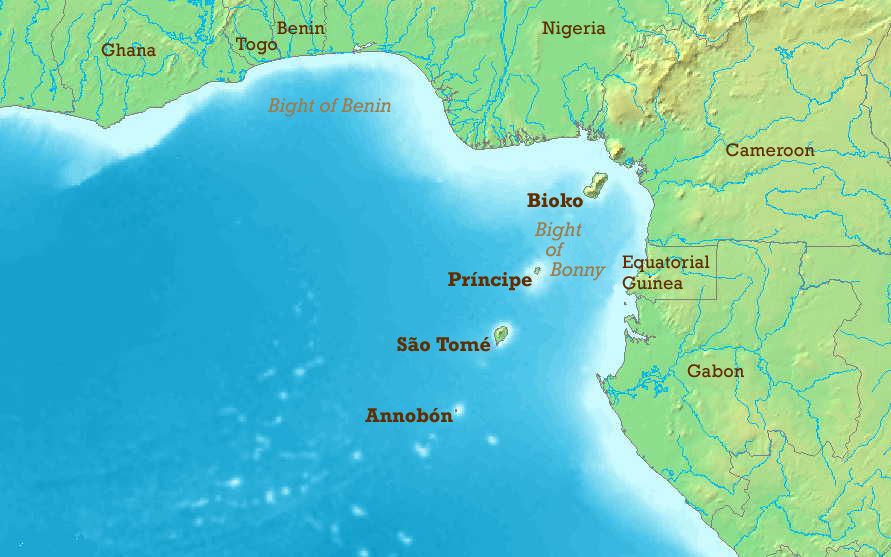
Location of Annobón in the Gulf of Guinea

After leaving Goeree on 27 June 1598, the ships sailed to the Channel but anchored in the Downs until mid July. When the ships approached the shores of North Africa, Simon de Cordes realised his rations had been far too generous in the early weeks of the voyage and instituted a rationing policy. At the end of August, the ships landed at Santiago, Cape Verde and Mayo off the coast of Africa because of a lack of water and need for fresh fruit. They stayed around three weeks in the hope of buying some goats. Near Praia, the expedition succeeded in occupying a Portuguese castle on the top of a hill but came back without anything substantial. At Brava, Cape Verde, half of the crew of the Hoop caught fever and most of the men were sick, among them Admiral Jacques Mahu. After Mahu's death, leadership of the expedition was taken over by Simon de Cordes, with Van Beuningen as vice admiral. Because of contrary wind, the fleet was blown off course (northeast in the opposite direction) and arrived at Cape Lopez, Gabon, Central Africa. An outbreak of scurvy forced a landing on Annobón on 9 December. Several men became sick with dysentery. They stormed the island only to find that the Portuguese and their native allies had set fire to their houses and fled into the hills. The Dutch put all their sick men ashore to recover and left in early January. Because of starvation, the men fell into great weakness; some tried to eat leather. On 10 March 1599 they reached the Rio de la Plata in what is now Argentina.

By early April, the crew arrived at the Strait, 570 km (350 mi) long, 2 km (1.2 mi) wide at its narrowest point, with an inaccurate chart of the seabed. The wind was unfavorable and remained so for the next four months. Under freezing temperatures and poor visibility, they caught penguins, seals, mussels, ducks, and fish. About two hundred crew members died. On 23 August, the weather improved.

=== Voyage to Pacific ===
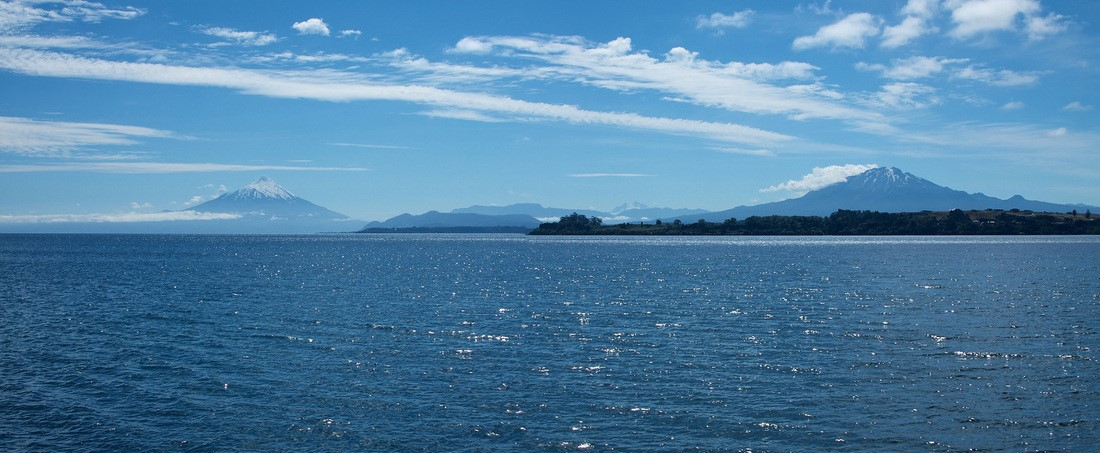
Blue skies over Chiloe

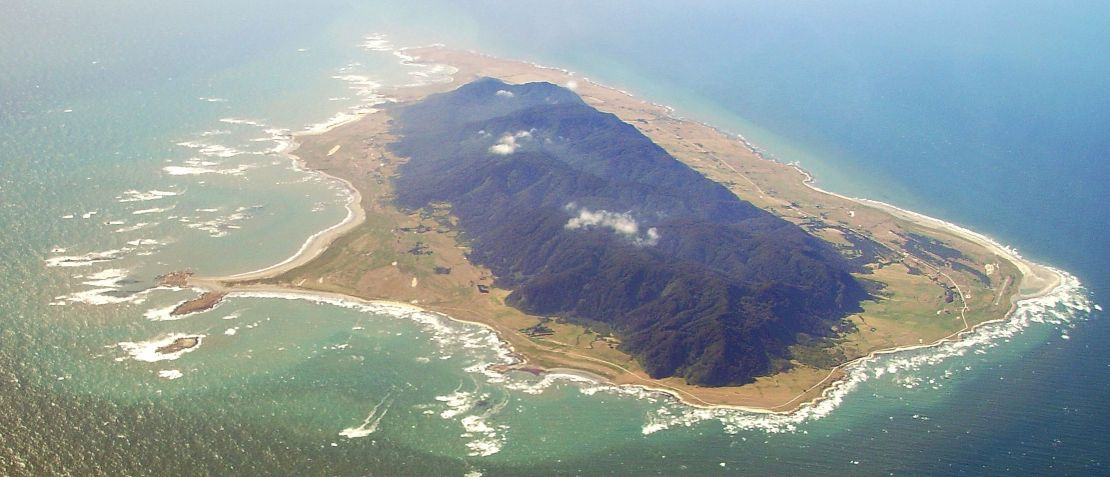
Aerial view of La Mocha

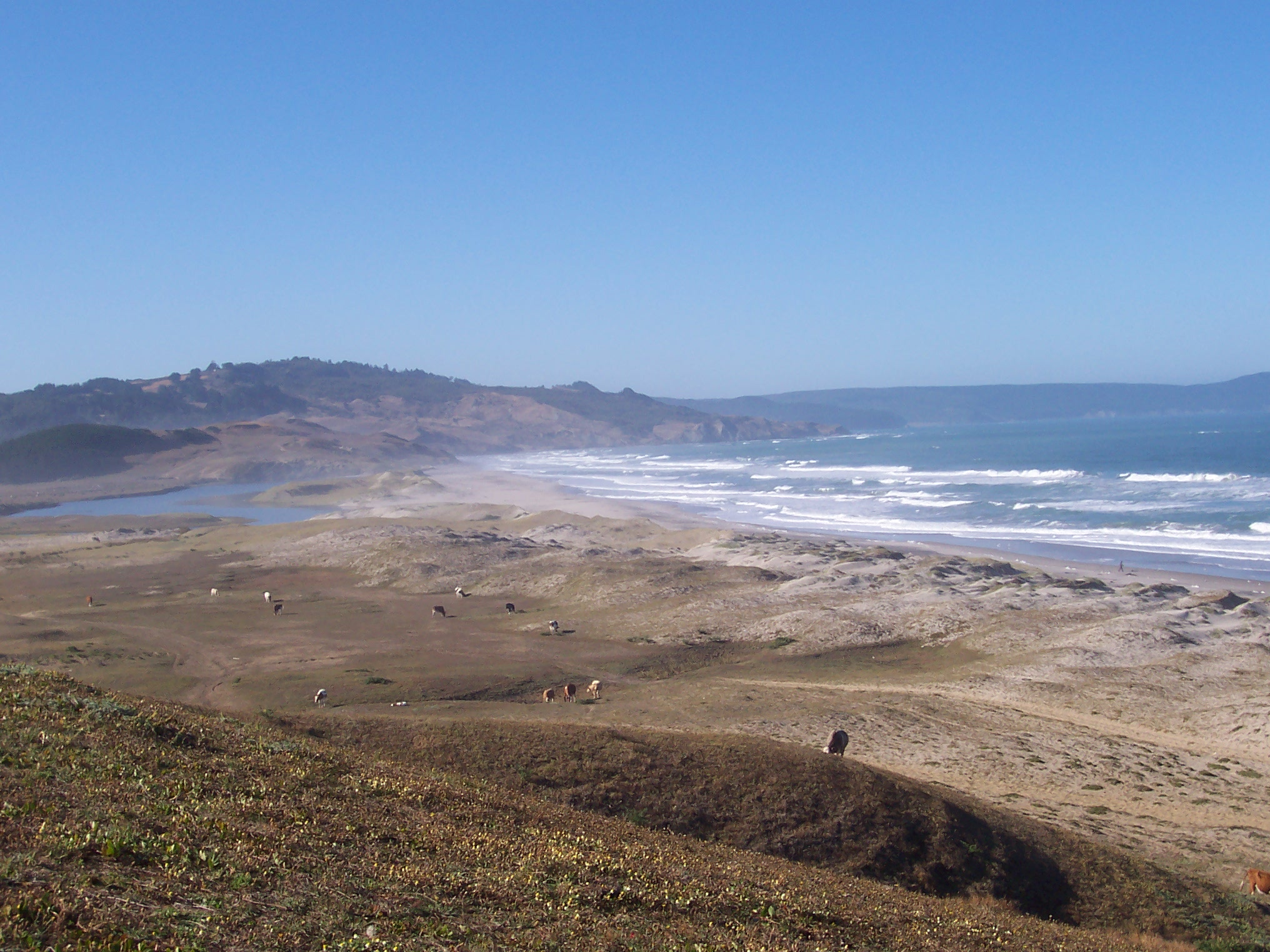
Coast near Punta Lavapié

When the expedition finally reached the Pacific Ocean on 3 September 1599, the ships were caught in a storm and lost sight of each other. The Trouw and the Geloof were driven back into the strait. After more than a year, each ship went its own way. The Geloof returned to Rotterdam in July 1600 with 36 survivors of the original 109 crew.

De Cordes ordered his small fleet to wait four weeks for each other on Santa María Island, Chile, but some ships missed the island. Adams wrote "they brought us sheep and potatoes". From here the story becomes less reliable because of a lack of sources and changes in command. In early November, the Hoop arrived at Mocha Island where 27 people, including Simon de Cordes, were killed by people from Araucania. (In the account given to Olivier van Noort, it was said that Simon de Cordes was slain at the Punta de Lavapie, but Adams gives Mocha Island as the scene of his death.) The Liefde hit the island, but went on to Punta Lavapié near Concepción, Chile. A Spanish captain supplied the Trouw and Hoop with food; the Dutch helped him against the Araucans, who had killed 23 Dutch, including Thomas Adams (according to his brother in his second letter) and Gerrit van Beuningen. He was replaced by Jacob Quaeckernaeck.

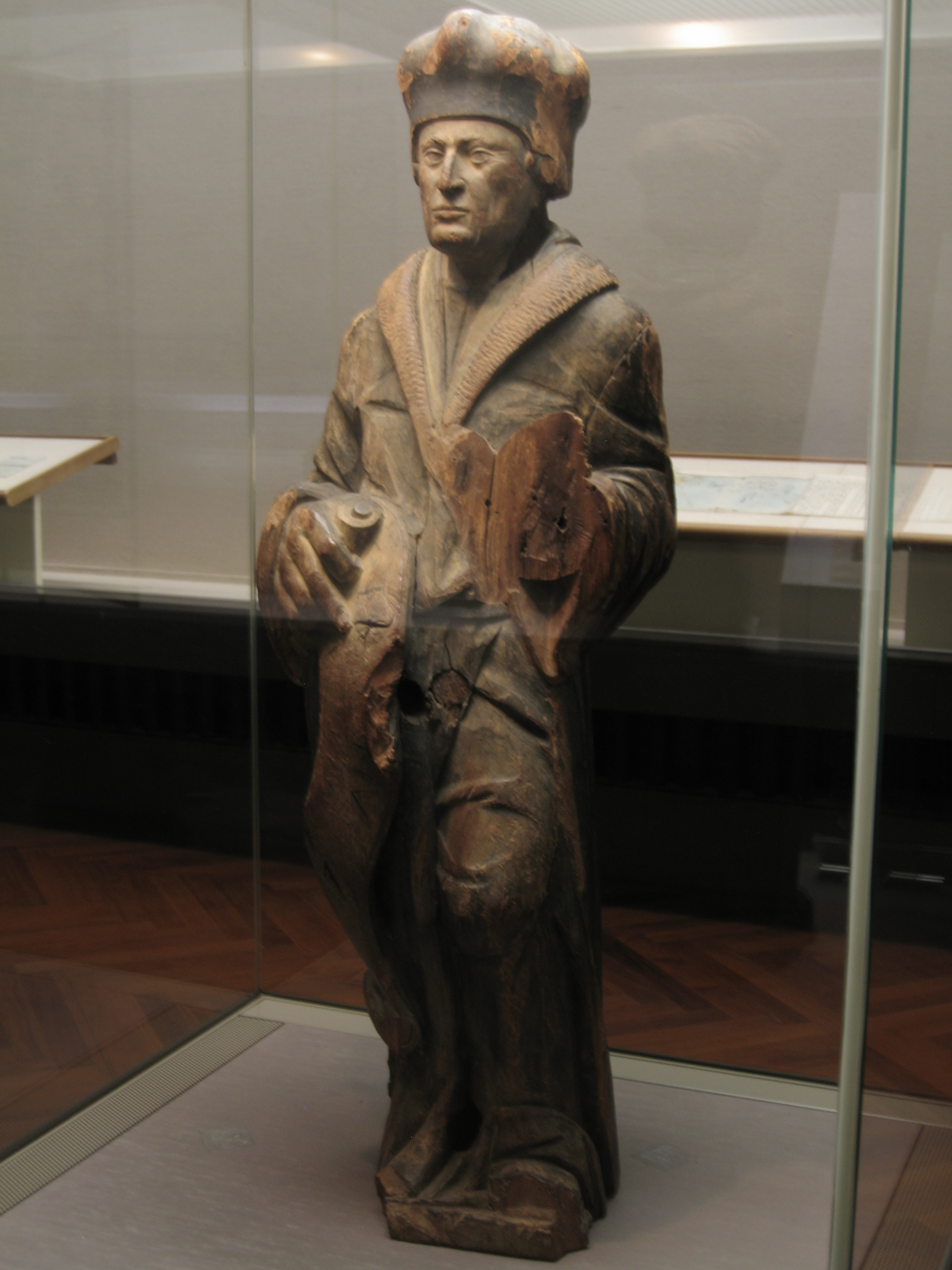
Wooden figure of Desiderius Erasmus which served as the stern ornament of the Liefde, now in the Tokyo National Museum.

The Trouw reached Tidore (Eastern Indonesia), where the crew were killed by the Portuguese in January 1601. In fear of the hostile Spaniards, the remaining crews determined to leave Floreana Island and sail across the Pacific. On 27 November 1599, when both ships sailed to Japan, the fleet was stranded on an isle which is believed to have been Hawaii.

== Service under Shogunate ==
On 19 April 1600, when Adams and his Dutch colleague Jan Joosten arrived at Japan, they told Ieyasu about the world situation, including that there were many conflicts in Europe, and that the Jesuits and other Catholics (e.g. Portuguese, Spanish), who had been proselytizing Christianity in Japan, and the Protestants (e.g. Dutch, English) were on different sides and were in conflict with each other. Ieyasu reportedly took a liking to them for their frankness and regarded them as trustworthy. According to the record from Spanish envoy Diego de Santa Caterina, Adams was quick to convince Ieyasu that the Spanish had ulterior motives in sending missionaries to Japan.

Furthermore, according to records from Spanish accounts, 19 cannons from the De Liefde, the ship of Adams and Joosten, were also used by the Tokugawa army in the battle of Sekigahara.

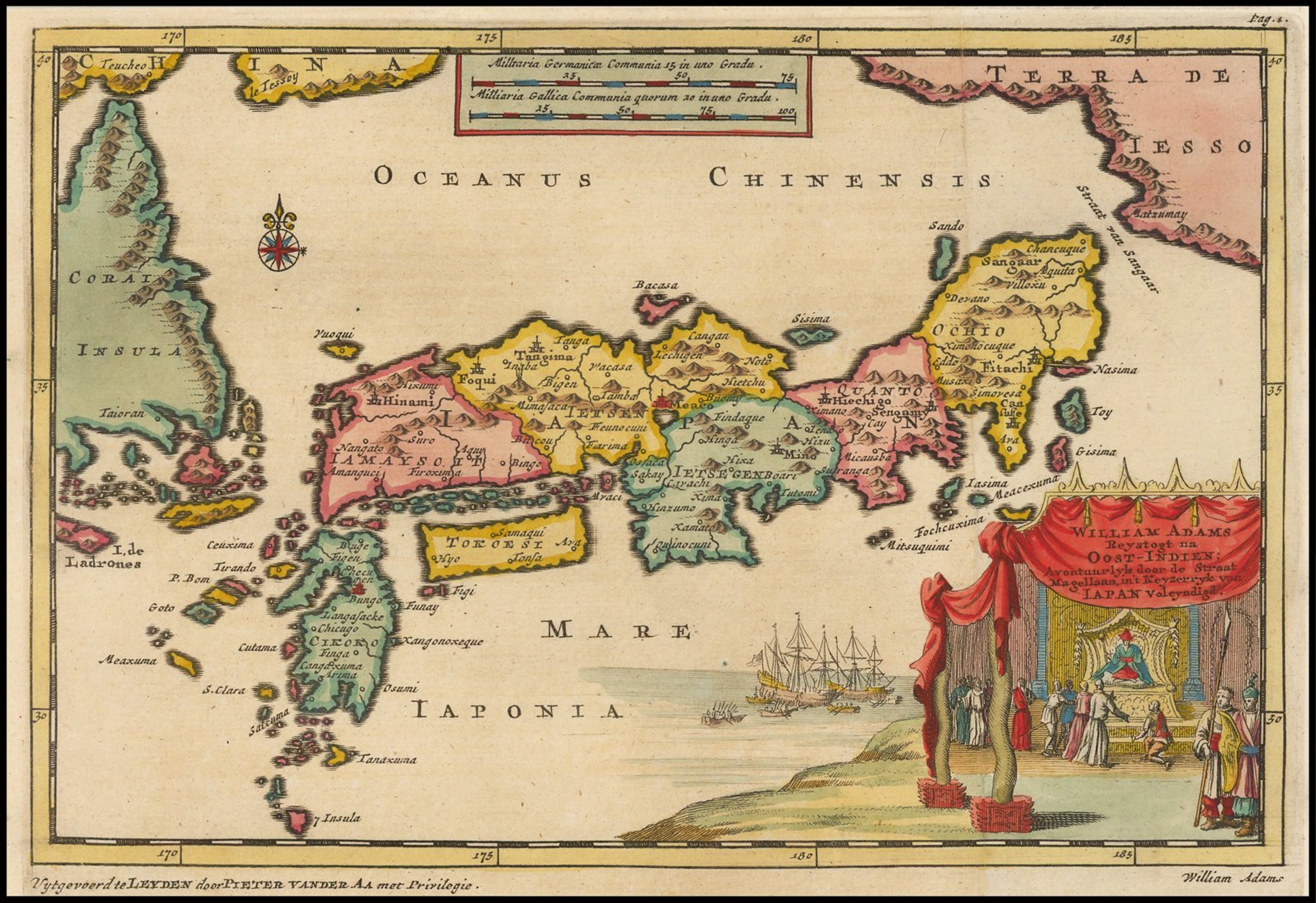
1707 map of Japan, with a cartouche representing the audience of William Adams with the shōgun. From Naaukeurige Versamelling der Gedenk-Waardigste Zee en Land-Reysen (a series of accounts of famous Sea and Land-Voyages). By Pieter van der Aa.

In 1604, he built the first shipbuilding dock in Japan in Ito.

In 1605, Ieyasu appointed him as a jikatatori hatamoto; or a direct vassal in the court of the shōgun, and gave him the name Miura Anjin. (Note: Miura comes from the name of a territory in Japan, and Anjin means pilot.) In the same year, Adams secured an authorisation letter from Ieyasu to invite the Dutch East India Company to trade with Japan.

In 1607, in response to Adams's achievements, Ieyasu selected him for the high-prestige position of direct retainer in the shōgun's court, entrusting him with territories and swords from Miura-gun (now a part of Yokosuka City). After Tokugawa Hidetada was installed as the second shōgun and Ieyasu became Ōgosho (retired shōgun), they formed a dual government: Hidetada controlled the official court with the government central located in Edo city, and Ieyasu controlled his own unofficial shadow government called the "Sunpu government" with its center at Sunpu Castle. The Sunpu government's cabinet consisted of trusted vassals of Ieyasu who were not in Hidetada's cabinet, including Adams and Lodensteijn, to whom Ieyasu entrusted foreign affairs and diplomacy. Adams also received generous revenues from his service under Ieyasu (Note: Adams here refers to Tokugawa Ieyasu as "the Emperor"; however, this was not his title. Ieyasu was the shogun, serving under Emperor Go-Yōzei.) and was granted a domain in Hemi (ja:逸見) within the frontier of present-day Yokosuka City, with nearly a hundred slaves and servants.

Also in 1607, Ieyasu gave order to Adams and his companions to assist Mukai Shōgen, a chief commander of Uraga naval forces, to build the shogunate's first Western-style vessel. The sailing ship was built at the harbour of Itō on the east coast of the Izu Peninsula. Carpenters from the harbour supplied the manpower to build an 80-ton ship, which would be used to patrol the coast of Japan.

The following year, Ieyasu ordered a larger ship of 120 tons to be built. This 120-ton ship was known as San Buena Ventura, which had ocean-crossing capabilities. In 1610, San Buena Ventura travelled to Mexico with Rodrigo de Vivero and Tanaka Shōsuke on board; Tanaka was the first recorded Japanese to have travelled to the Americas.

=== Diplomacy with Europe and New Spain ===
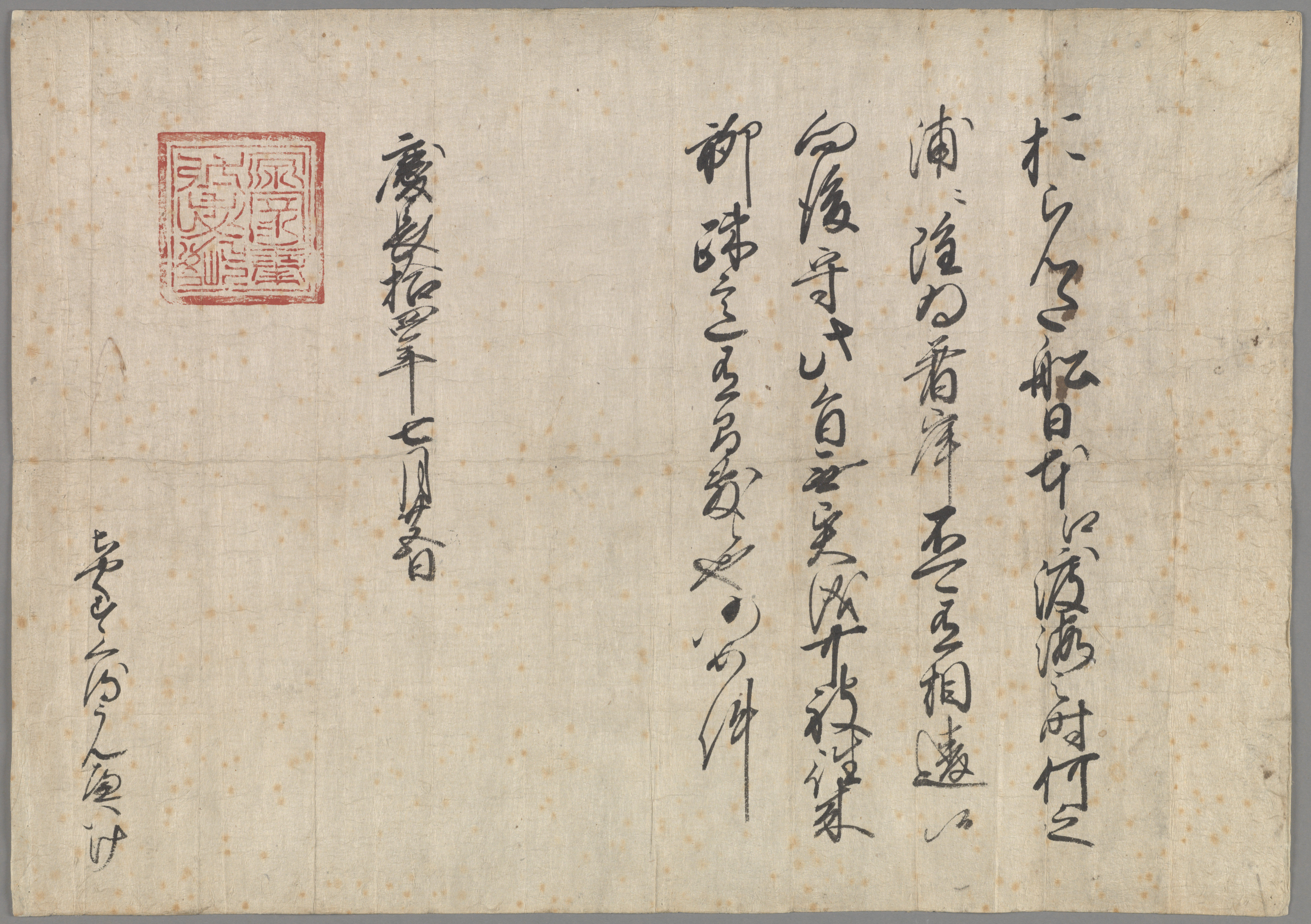
The "trade pass" (Dutch: handelspas) issued in the name of Tokugawa Ieyasu. The text commands: "Dutch ships are allowed to travel to Japan, and they can disembark on any coast, without any reserve. From now on this regulation must be observed, and the Dutch left free to sail where they want throughout Japan. No offenses to them will be allowed, such as on previous occasions" – dated 24 August 1609 (Keichō 14, 25th day of the 7th month)

Until 1609, the Dutch were not able to send ships to Japan due to conflicts with the Portuguese and limited resources in Asia. On 2 July 1609, a pair of Dutch ships led by Jacques Specx, De Griffioen ("the Griffin," armed with 19 cannons) and Roode Leeuw met Pijlen ("Red Lion with Arrows," weighing 400 tons and armed with 26 cannons), reached Japan. The men of this Dutch expeditionary fleet established a trading base on Hirado Island. Two Dutch envoys, Puyck and van den Broek, were the official bearers of a letter from Prince Maurice of Nassau to the court of Edo. Adams negotiated and helped these Dutch emissaries to obtain trading rights throughout Japan as well as the right to establish a trading factory:

The Hollandes be now settled (in Japan) and I have got them that privilege as the Spaniards and Portingals could never get in this 50 or 60 years in Japan.

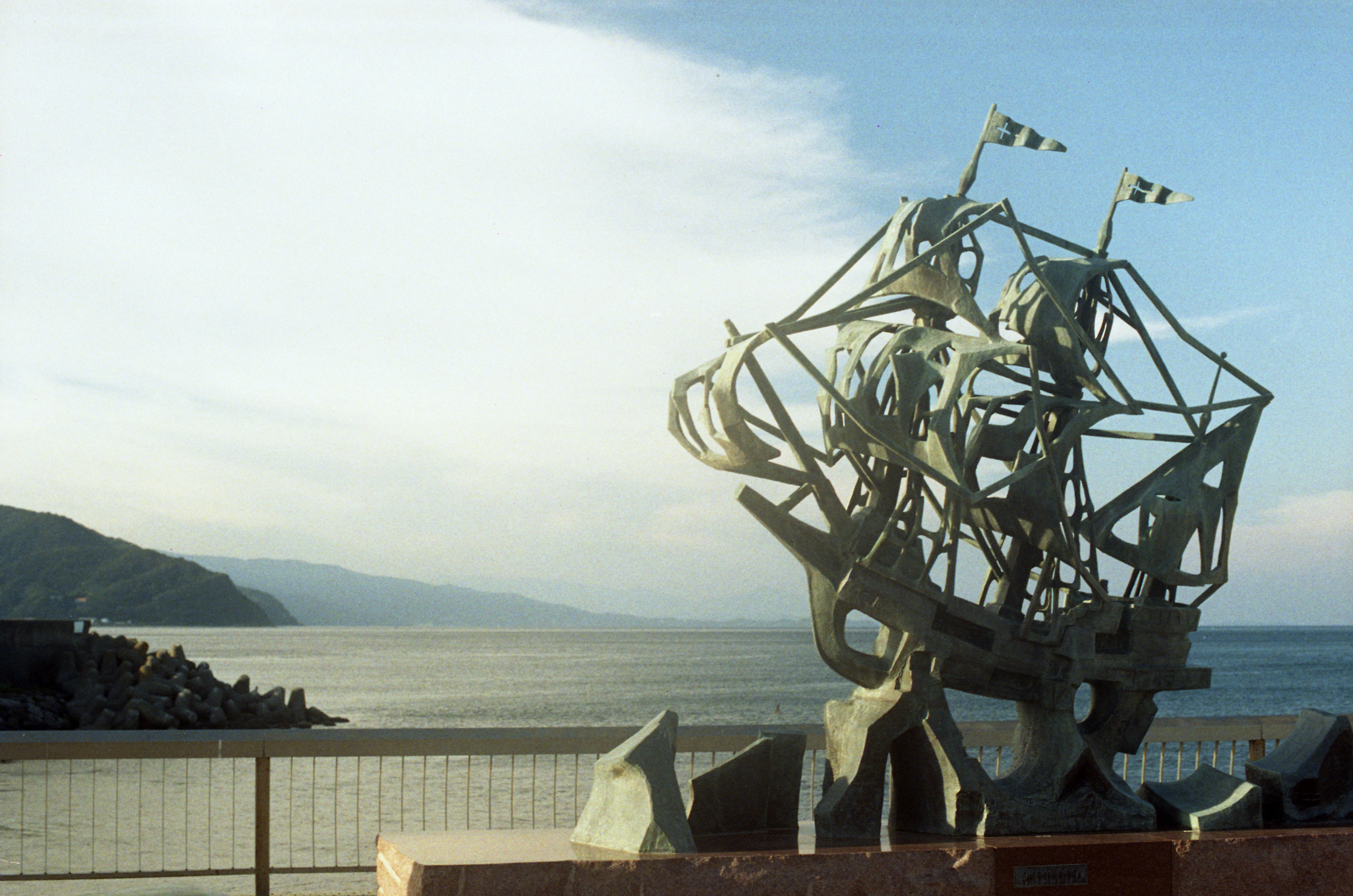
Statue of San Buena Ventura at Anjin Memorial Park

In 1610, after the Nossa Senhora da Graça incident, Ieyasu replaced Jesuit translator João Rodrigues Tçuzu with William Adams as his counselor of affairs with the Europeans.

William Adams wrote a letter to the settlement to invite his family and friends in England to trade with Japan, suggesting that "the Hollanders have here an Indies of money."

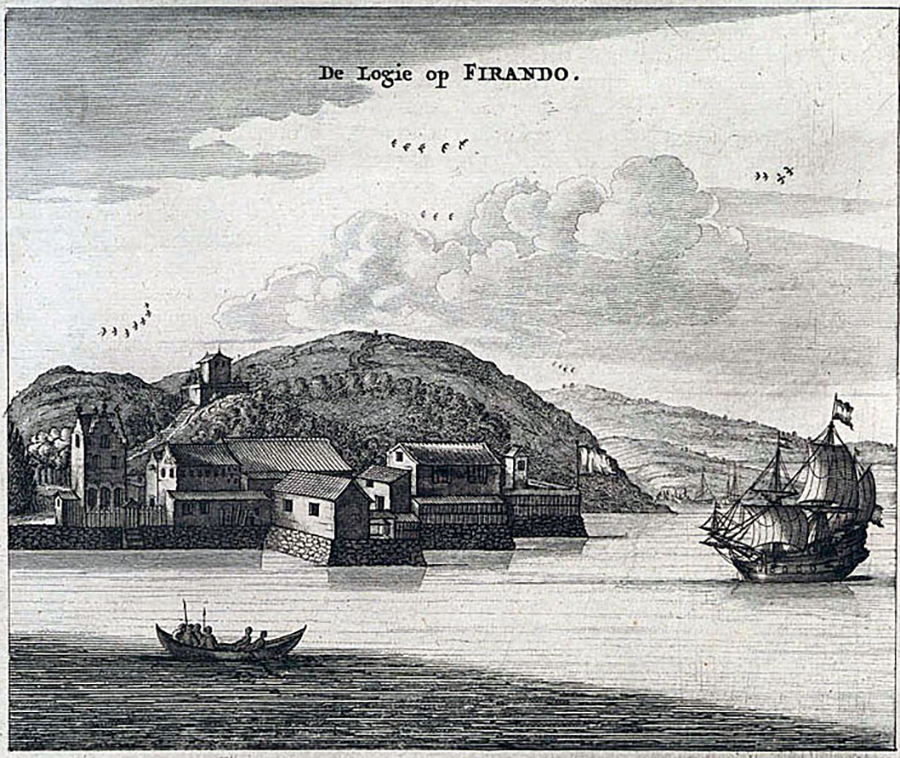
The Dutch VOC trading factory in Hirado (depicted here) was said to have been much larger than the English one. 17th-century engraving.

Adams travelled with John Saris to Sumpu Castle in Suruga to meet Ieyasu and seek permission to return to England. They continued to Kamakura, where they visited Kamakura Great Buddha, and Edo, where they met the acting shōgun Tokugawa Hidetada. Hidetada gave them a set of Japanese armour as a gift for King James I of England. They returned to Sumpu on 29 September, where Ieyasu gave them a "Red Seal", a licence of permission for foreign tradings in Japan. Due to Adams's immersion to the Japanese Culture, Saris even called him a "naturalized Japanese" in his journal.

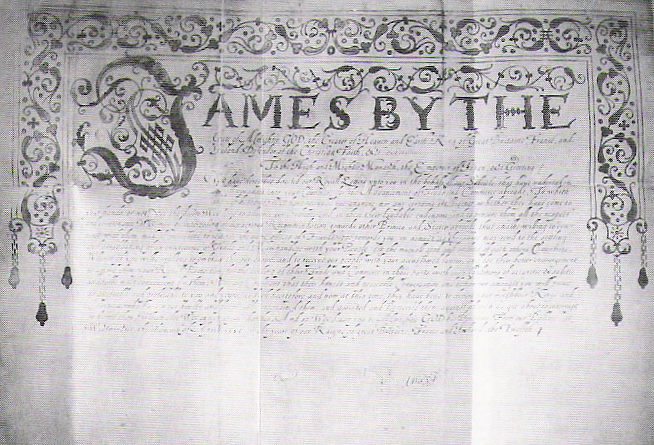
The 1613 letter of King James I remitted to Tokugawa Ieyasu (preserved in the Tokyo University archives).

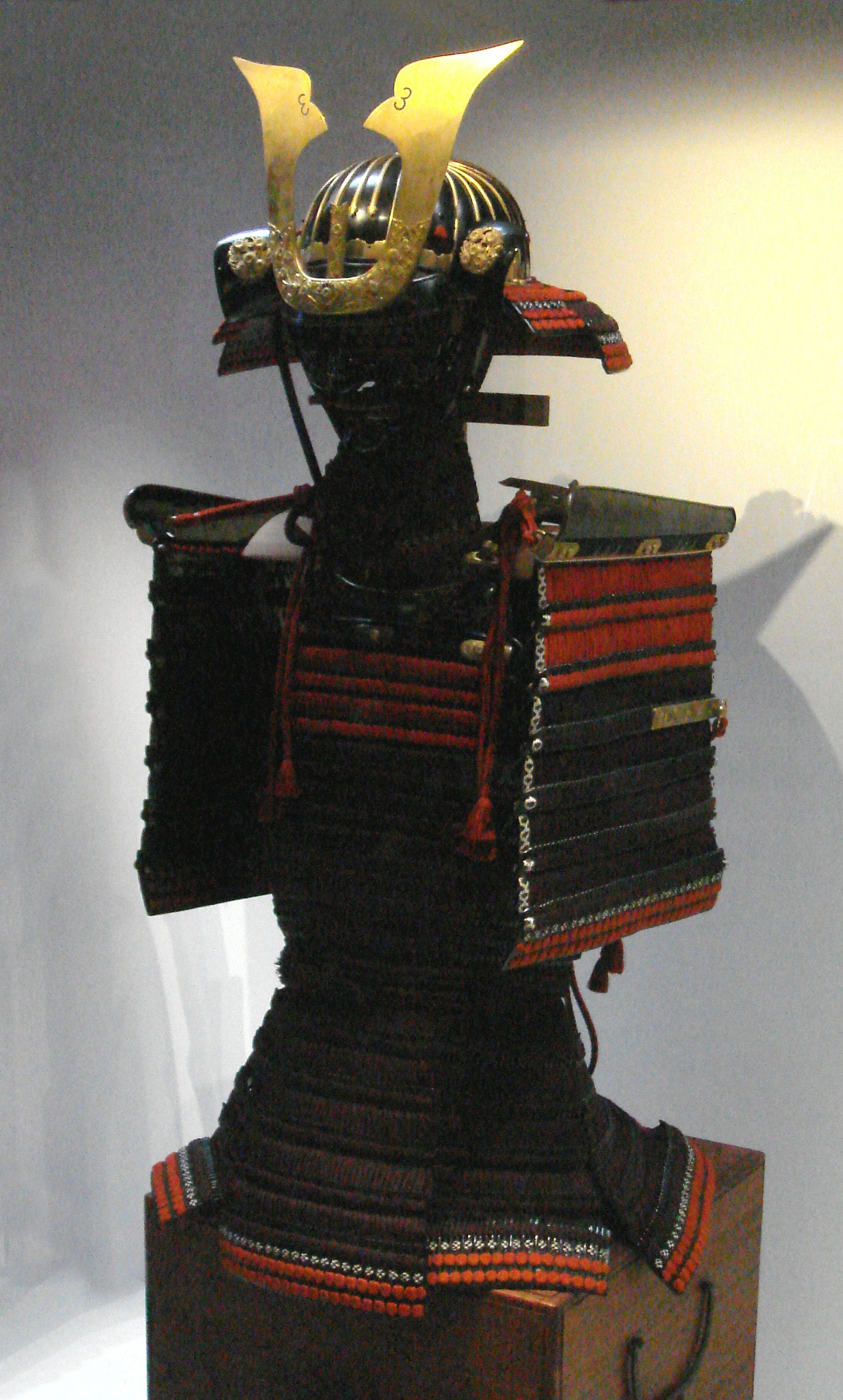
One of the two Japanese suits of armour presented by Tokugawa Hidetada and entrusted to John Saris to convey to King James I in 1613. The pictured suit of armour is displayed in the Tower of London.

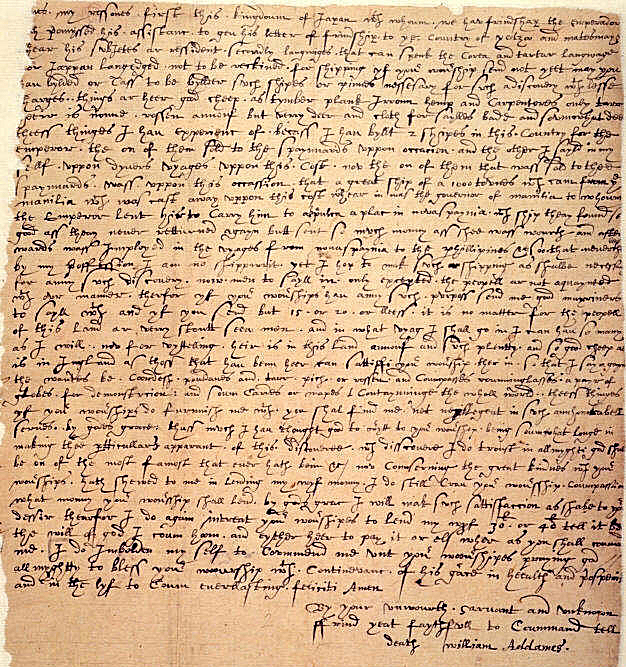
Excerpt from a letter written by William Adams at Hirado in Japan to the East India Company in London, 1 December 1613. British Library.

In 1614, Father Diogo de Carvalho complained about the threat posed by Adams and other Protestant merchants in his annual report to Pope Paul V, stating that William Adams and his companions had influenced Ieyasu to be hostile to Catholics. Tokugawa Ieyasu, influenced by Adams's anti-Catholic counsels and the increase in samurai and daimyos converting to Catholicism (as in the Okamoto Daihachi incident, for example), banished all Portuguese Jesuits from Japan in 1614. He also demanded that all Japanese Catholics abandon their new faith and launched what would become a centuries-long policy of religious persecution aimed at those who refused.

In the same year, Adams received permission from both Japan and England to return to England. John Saris disliked Adams for his insistence on following Japanese customs, while Adams himself had mutual feeling towards Saris for his perceived rude behavior. After the Clove left, Adams helped out at the English trading post in Japan, although he was paid less than he had been working at the Dutch trading post. Richard Cocks, the head of the Hirado factory, praised Adams's manners and his calm temperament, which Cocks described as similar to those of his Japanese hosts. In a letter to the East India Company, Cocks wrote that he found Adams to be easy to approach and confirmed his willingness to cooperate with Adams for the next seven years. On the eve of Siege of Osaka, Ieyasu prepared for the war effort by stockpiling ammunition. In May, a company of English merchants tried to sell lead in Hirado but failed to find a buyer until, with the help of Adams, the shogunate purchased their entire stock. In the same month, the shogunate bought lead from a Dutch trading company. Later in June, Adams acted as middleman while Tokugawa Ieyasu stockpiled cannons, gunpowder, and bullets purchased from English merchants. The prices agreed upon were 1 kan for cannons, 2.3 bun for gunpowder, and 1.6 bun for bullets. Later in the same year, Adams wanted to organise a trade expedition to Siam to bolster profits and help the company's situation, so he bought and upgraded a 200-ton Japanese junk ship, renamed it Sea Adventure, and hired a crew: around 120 Japanese sailors and merchants, several Chinese traders, an Italian, a Spanish trader and Richard Wickham and Edmund Sayers of the English factory's staff. The ship sailed from Hirado in November. The enterprise aimed to purchase raw silk, Chinese goods, Biancaea sappan, deer skins, and ray skins for the hilts of katana swords.

=== Service under Hidetada ===
In 1616, according to Frederik Cryns, a professor of International Research Center for Japanese Studies, as Adams lost his influence within the Shogunate, he failed to convince Hidetada about the importance of free trade for Japan and eventually was removed from his position as a diplomatic advisor, a position which he enjoyed during Ieyasu's reign.

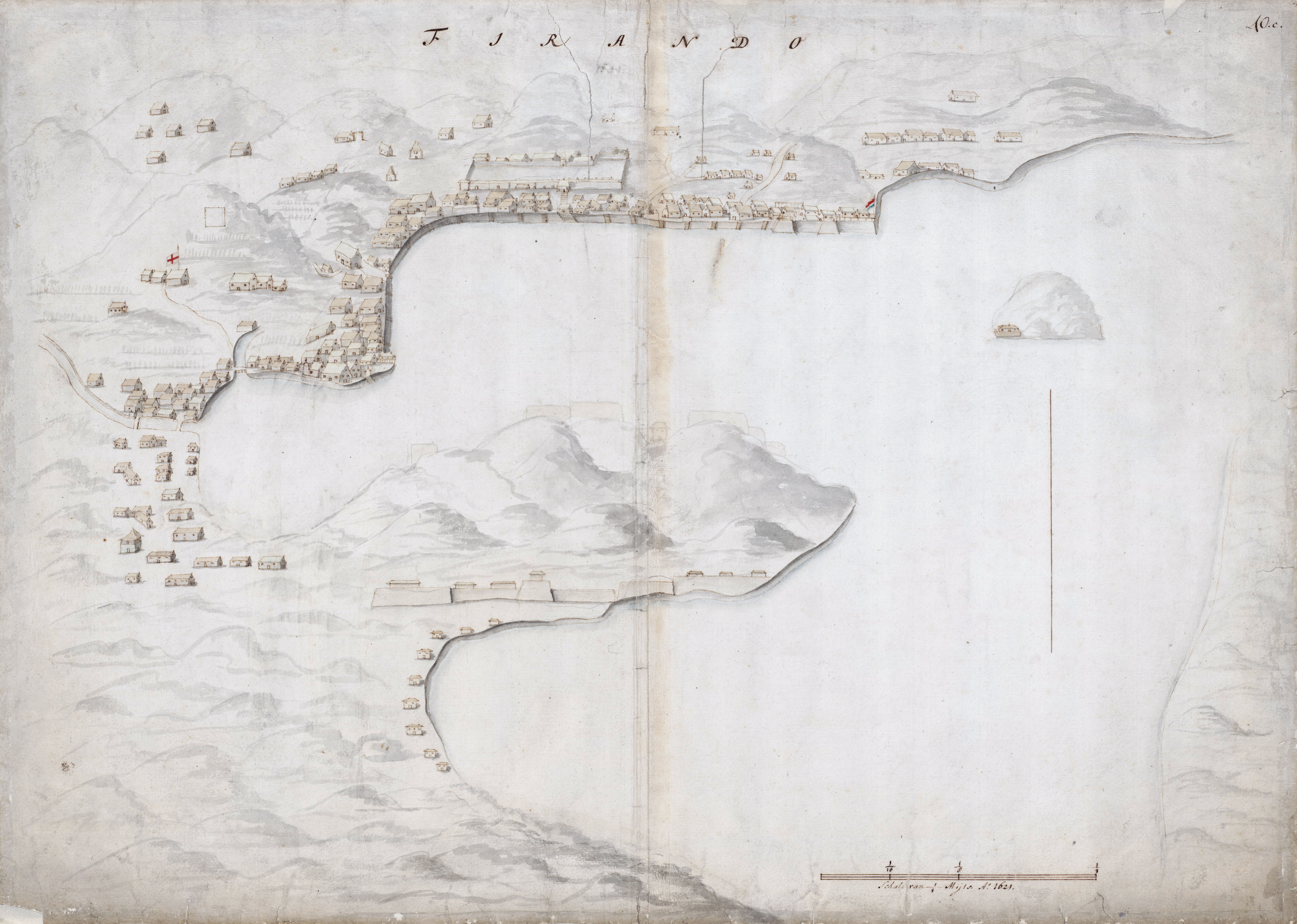
Topographical map of the bay of Hirado in 1621. To the right on the shore-line, the Dutch East India Company trading post is marked with the red-white-blue flag of the Netherlands. To the far left, back from the shore-line is a white flag with red cross, the St George's Cross of England at the East India Company trading post.

In March 1617, Adams set sail to Cochinchina on a junk ship which he had purchased and brought from Siam and renamed Gift of God. He intended to find two English sailors, Tempest Peacock and Walter Carwarden. Once in Cochinchina, however, Adams learned that Peacock, a drunk, had committed murder. Adams killed Peacock and chased after Carwarden, who was waiting downstream with a boat. Realizing that Adams had killed his companion, Carwarden panicked, capsized his boat, and drowned.

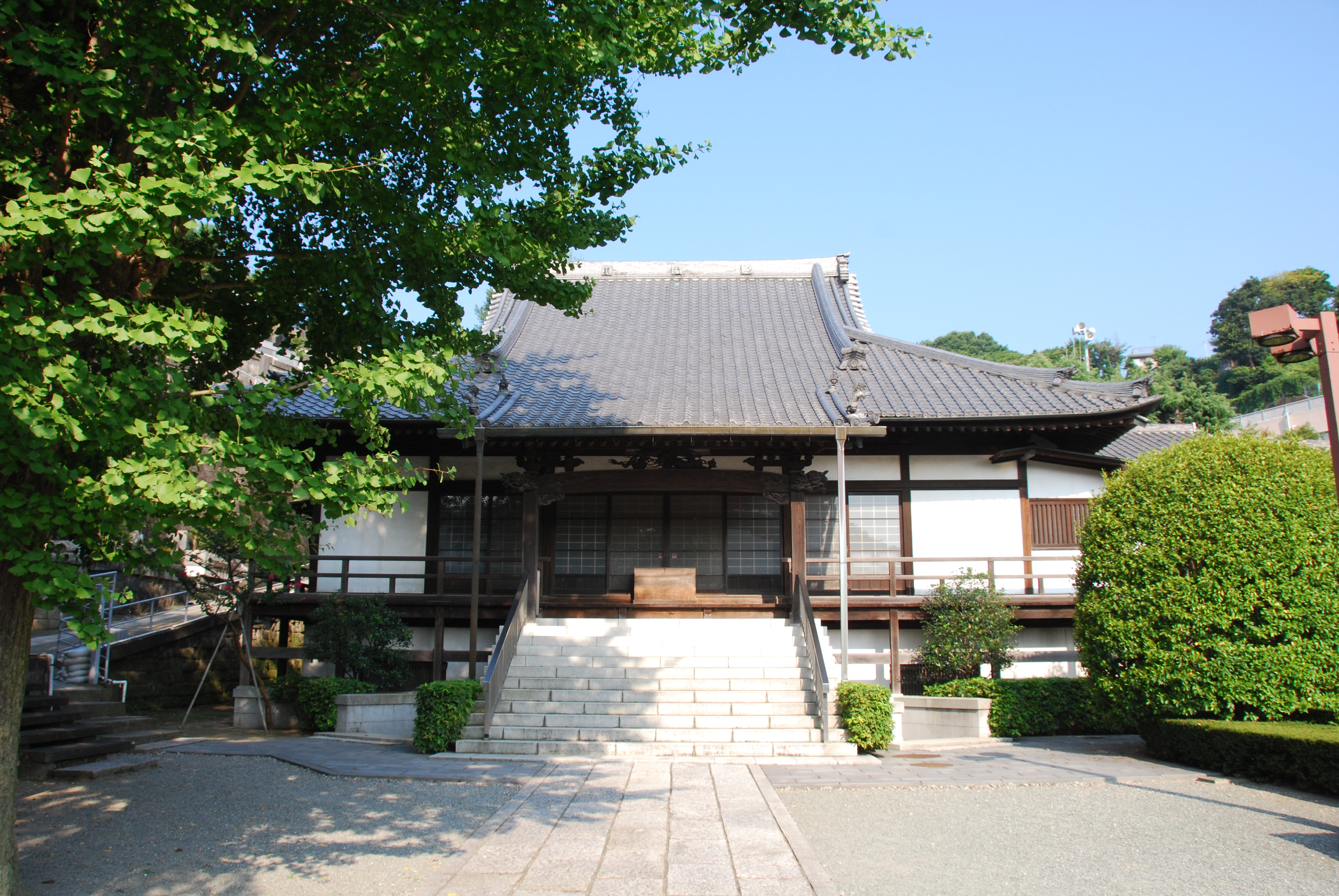
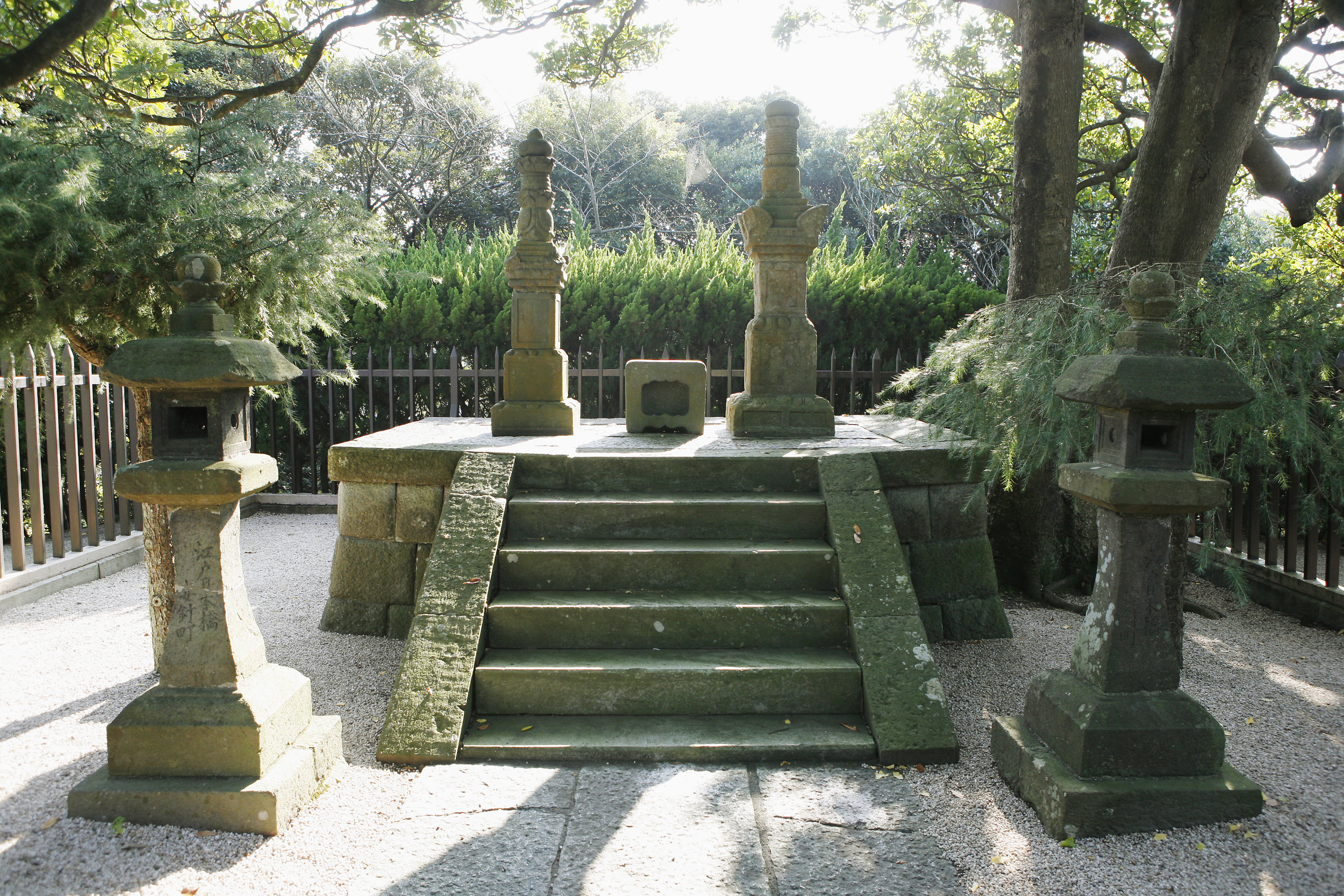
Left: Jōdo-ji temple in Yokosuka City
Right: Memorial towers for Anjin Miura and Anjin's wife.

=== Death ===
Adams died at Hirado, north of Nagasaki, on 16 May 1620, at the age of 55. In his will, he left his residence in Edo, his domain in Hemi (in Yokosuka).

Cocks wrote: "I cannot but be sorrowful for the loss of such a man as Capt William Adams, he having been in such favour with two Emperors of Japan as never any Christian in these part of the world." Cocks records that Hidetada transferred the lordship from William Adams to his son Joseph Adams with the attendant rights to the estate at Hemi.

Adams was buried in Hirado next to a memorial to Saint Francis Xavier. A few years later, many foreign cemeteries were destroyed and the Tokugawa shogunate began aggressively persecuting Christians.

== Personal life ==
During his stay in Japan, Adams developed a high esteem for Japanese society under the Tokugawa shogunate. He viewed the Japanese as courteous, valiant, impartial in justice, and civilly governed.

According to American author and literature expert Susan Wise Bauer, William Adams was a fervent Protestant who detested Catholics.

=== Family ===
Adams was recorded to have married Mary Hyn in the parish church of St Dunstan's, Stepney, on 20 August 1589. They had two children together, a son John and a daughter Deliverance. Mary died in 1620 at Gillingham in Kent.

After settling in Japan, Adams married a Japanese woman, although there is no clear evidence of her name and background in either Japanese or European historical records. The family link to Magome is shown in Japanese historical accounts written in the 1800s, while the first known reference to the name "Oyuki" is from a fictional work in 1973, and earlier fictional accounts refer to Adams's wife by names such as Mary, Tsu, Bikuni, Tae, and Chrysanthemum.

Adams and his Japanese wife had a son Joseph and a daughter Susanna. Some accounts describe Adams having other children with concubines or mistresses, but no such children were named in his will.

By 1629, only two of Adams's shipmates from 1600 survived in Japan: Melchior van Santvoort and Vincent Romeyn lived quietly in Nagasaki.

In 1635, Hidetada's successor Tokugawa Iemitsu enforced the Sakoku Edict for Japan to be closed against foreign trading; both Joseph and Susanna disappear from historical records at that time.

== Historical legacy and evaluations ==
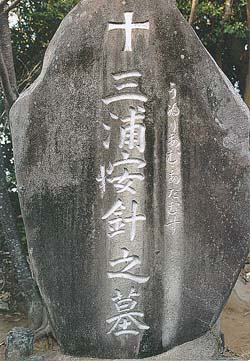
Grave of Miura Anjin, Hirado, Nagasaki Prefecture, Japan. The small hiragana characters to the right are a phonetic transcription of "William Adams", using the historical character 'ゐ' for 'wi'.

It was rumoured that Adams's bones were taken for safekeeping by a family member or close friend and reburied at what is now the William Adams Memorial Park on Sakigata Hill, Hirado. In 1931, a grave marked as a Miura family tomb was excavated and skeletal remains discovered there were assumed to belong to Adams, but without DNA evidence this could not be confirmed with certainty. The remains were later placed in a Showa period ceramic funerary urn and reburied under a tombstone dedicated to Miura Anjin.

An urn matching the 1931 description was excavated in 2017. In 2019, Japanese archaeologists announced the discovery of bones at the site believed to be those of Adams. The subsequent mtDNA analysis had indicated that Adams's mitochondrial DNA likely belongs to haplogroup H. The analysis also showed aspects such as the dietary habits and burial style that matched with Adams. In April 2020, the University of Tokyo conducted conclusive forensic tests on the bones and confirmed it was William Adams's grave.

French literary critic Michel Foucault retold Adams's tale in The Discourse on Language. According to Foucault, the story embodies one of the "great myths of European culture," and the idea that a mere sailor could teach mathematics to the Japanese shōgun shows the difference between the open exchange of knowledge in Europe, as opposed to the secretive control of knowledge under "oriental tyranny". In fact, Adams was not a mere sailor but the chief navigator of the fleet, and his value to the shōgun was in his practical knowledge of shipbuilding.

=== Posthumous honours ===
- A town in Edo (modern Tokyo), Anjin-chō (in modern-day Nihonbashi) was named after Adams, who had a house there. Anjin-chō no longer exists and the town is now known as Nihonbashi Muromachi 1-Chōme. However within Muromachi 1-Chōme a street, Anjin-dori, remains named after Adams.
- Anjinzuka railroad station in his former fiefdom, Hemi, in modern Yokosuka was named for him.
- Adams's birth town, Gillingham, held a Will Adams Festival every September from 2000 up to 2019, after which it was cancelled due to COVID-19 pandemic. Since the late 20th century, both Itō and Yokosuka have become sister cities of Gillingham.
- A monument to Adams was installed in Watling Street, Gillingham, Kent, opposite Darland Avenue.
- The townhouse of Will Adams still exists in Hirado. It is currently a sweet shop called Tsutaya at 431 Kihikidacho. It is known as Anjin no Yakata (Anjin's House).
- Adams has a second memorial monument at the location of his residence in Hemi. Consisting of a pair of hōkyōintō, the tuff memorial on the right is that of Adams, and the andesite one of the left is for his wife. The monuments were erected by his family in accordance with his will, and the site was designated as a National Historic Site in 1923.

== Popular culture ==
There are numerous works of fiction and non-fiction based on Adams:

- James Clavell based his best-selling novel Shōgun (1975) on Adams's life and changed the name of his protagonist to "John Blackthorne". It has been adapted in various forms:
  - 1980, as the NBC miniseries, Shōgun
  - 1989, as a video game James Clavell's Shōgun
  - 1990, as a Broadway production, Shōgun: The Musical
  - 2024, as the Emmy award winning FX series, Shōgun
- Murasame Tatsumasa, better known by his birth name Jakob Sebastian Björk, a Swedish actor with Japanese citizenship, played the role of William Adams in the 2023 Jidaigeki historical television drama What Will You Do, Ieyasu?.
- A semi-historical novel by Hiromi Rogers titled Anjin - The Life and Times of Samurai William Adams, 1564-1620: A Japanese Perspective retells the story of William Adams, where she brought references from another historical fiction book - the work of Japanese novelist Oshima Masahiro.
- William Dalton wrote Will Adams, The First Englishman in Japan: A Romantic Biography (London, 1861).
- Richard Blaker's The Needlewatcher (London, 1932) is the least romantic of the novels; he consciously attempted to de-mythologise Adams and write a careful historical work of fiction.
- James Scherer's Pilot and Shōgun (1935) dramatises a series of incidents based on Adams's life.
- American Robert Lund wrote Daishi-san (New York, 1960).
- Christopher Nicole's Lord of the Golden Fan (1973) portrays Adams as sexually frustrated in England and freed by living in Japan, where he has numerous encounters. The work is considered light pornography.
- The 2002 Giles Milton historical biography is titled Samurai William (2002).
- Adams also serves as the template for the protagonist in the PlayStation 4 and PC video game series Nioh (2017) and non-playable character in its prequel/sequel hybrid game (2020), but with supernatural and historical fiction elements. Unlike the historical William Adams, the game portrays him as an Irishman.
- It is possible that the character of Takeso Kensei (whose real name is Adam Monroe), from the Heroes TV series, was inspired by Adams.

=== Origins of Western mythology ===
Imaginary depiction of Adams from the 1934 dedication booklet for a memorial clock in Gillingham

According to Professor Derek Massarella of Chuo University in Tokyo, Adams was largely forgotten in England until the 1872 discovery of his alleged tomb in Japan led to a proliferation of myths and hyperbolic stories. Soon the public in England became embarrassed by the lack of their own monument or memorial to Adams in England. After years of lobbying, a memorial clock in Adams's honour was erected in Gillingham in 1934. The dedication pamphlet for this event includes an artist's depiction of Adams that Massarella dismisses as a complete fabrication. As for the tomb that sparked the frenzy, Massarella, writing two decades before the forensic mtDNA study, concludes that it likely has nothing to do with Adams.

== Gallery ==
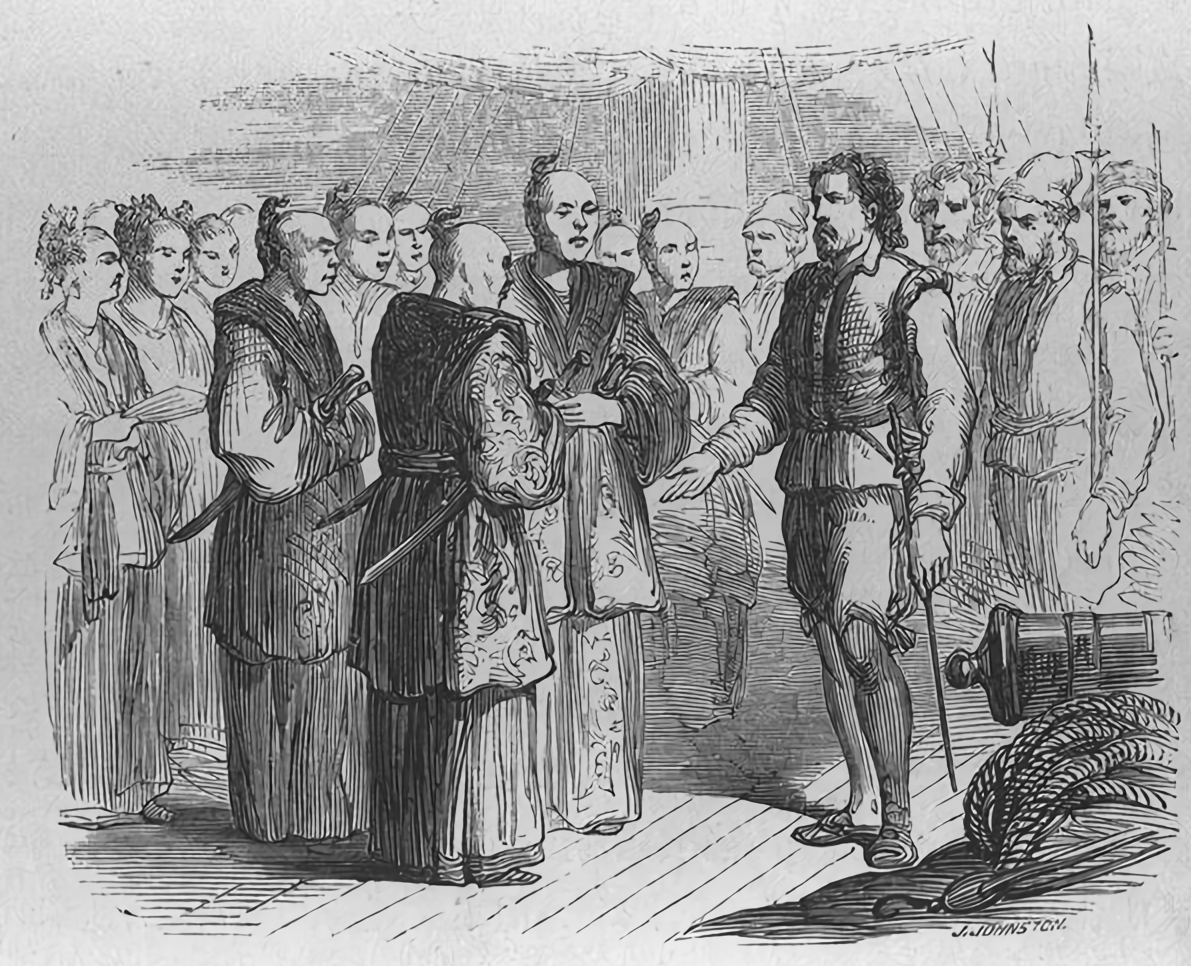
William Adams with a daimyo (feudal lord) and their attendants

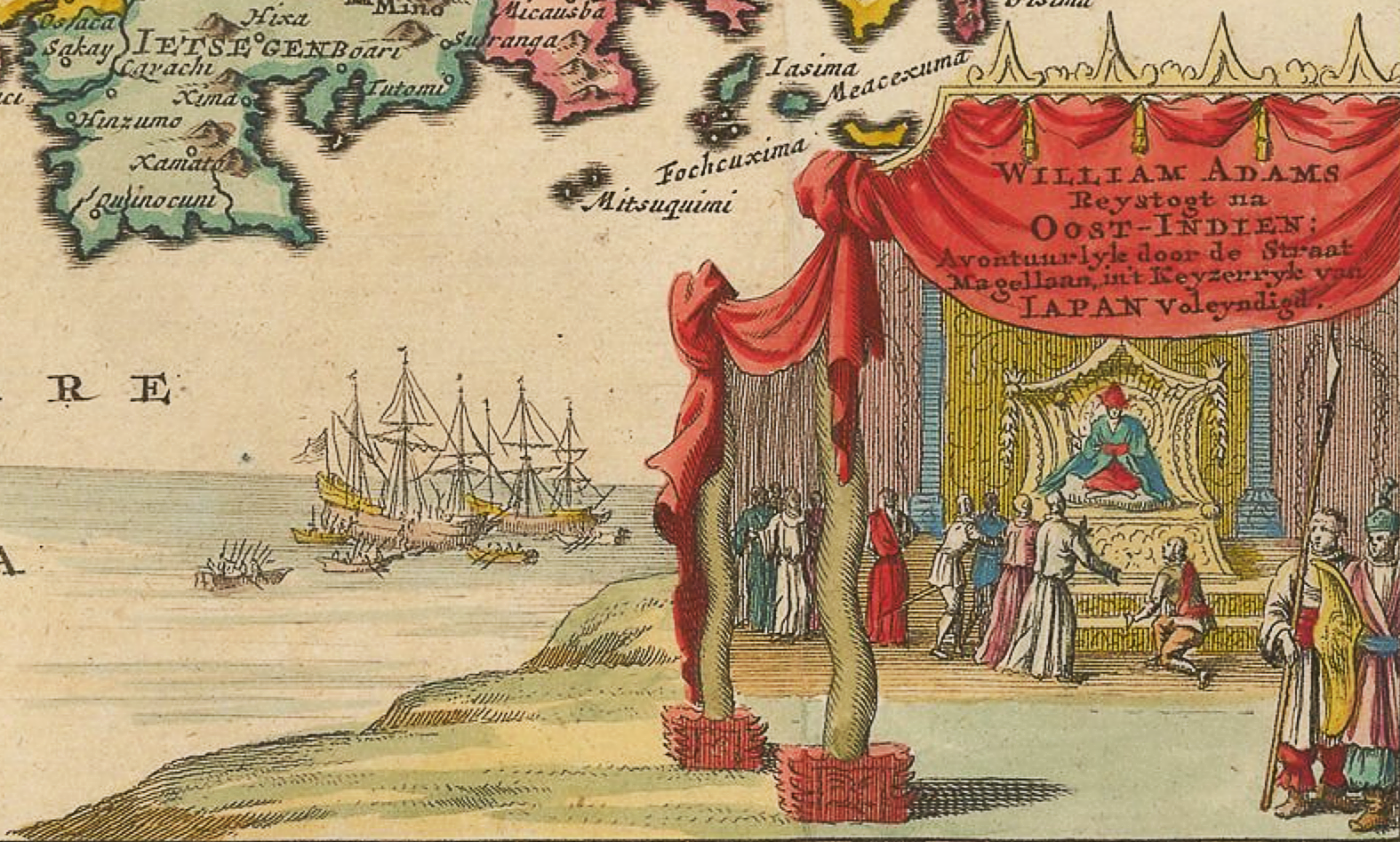
William Adams meets Tokugawa Ieyasu, in an idealised depiction of 1707.

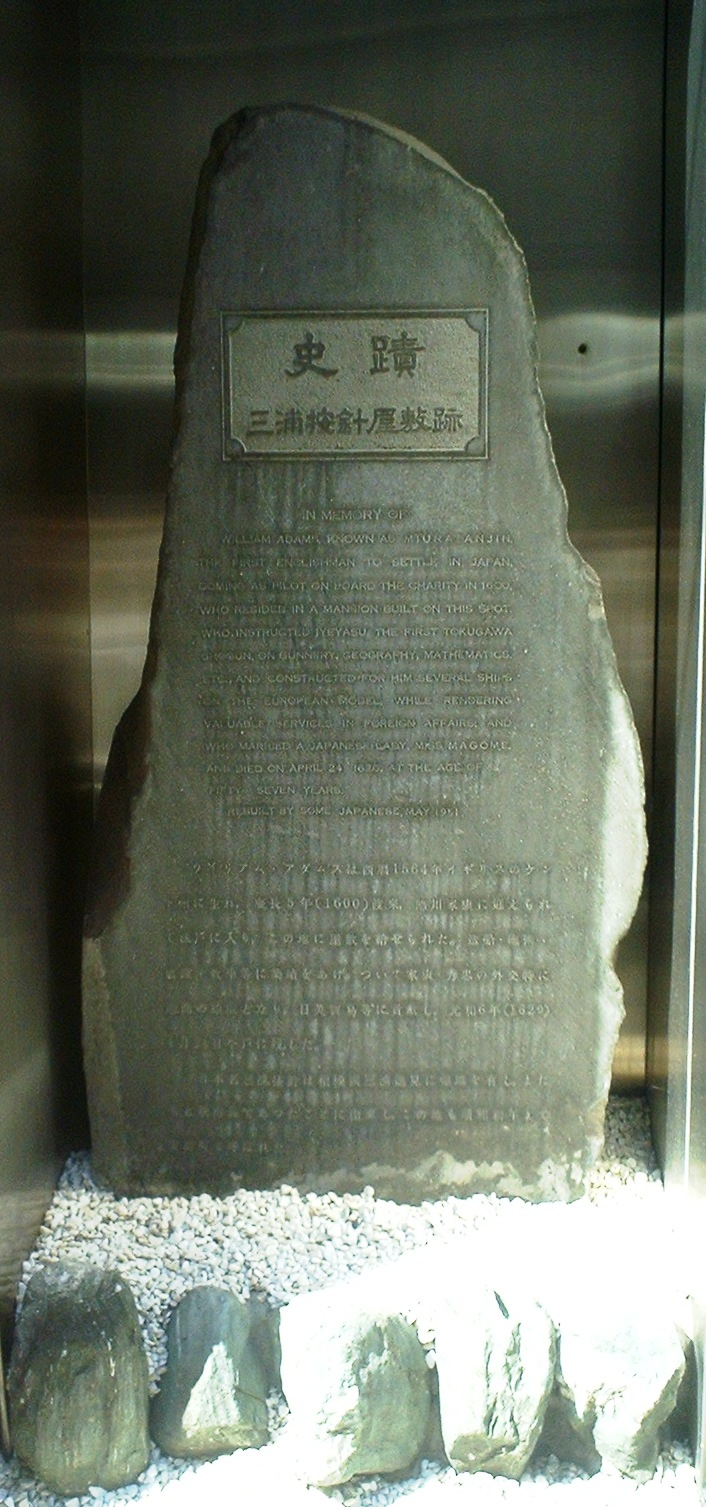
Right: "Monument at the site of William Adams's (written as Miura Anjin) residence," Chuo Ward, Tokyo.

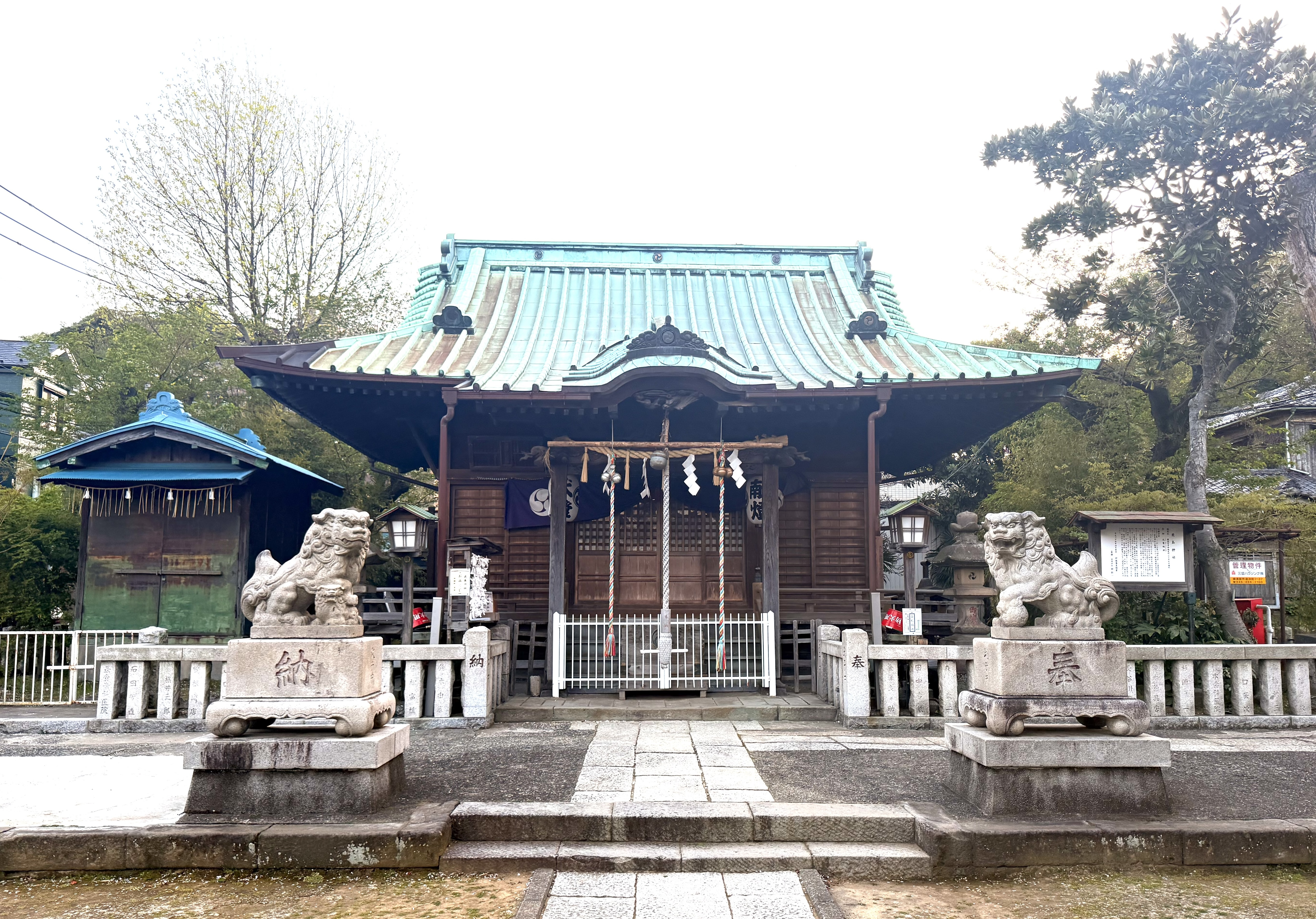
The location of William Adams's mansion (now Kashima Jinja Shrine) in Hemi, Miura, Japan

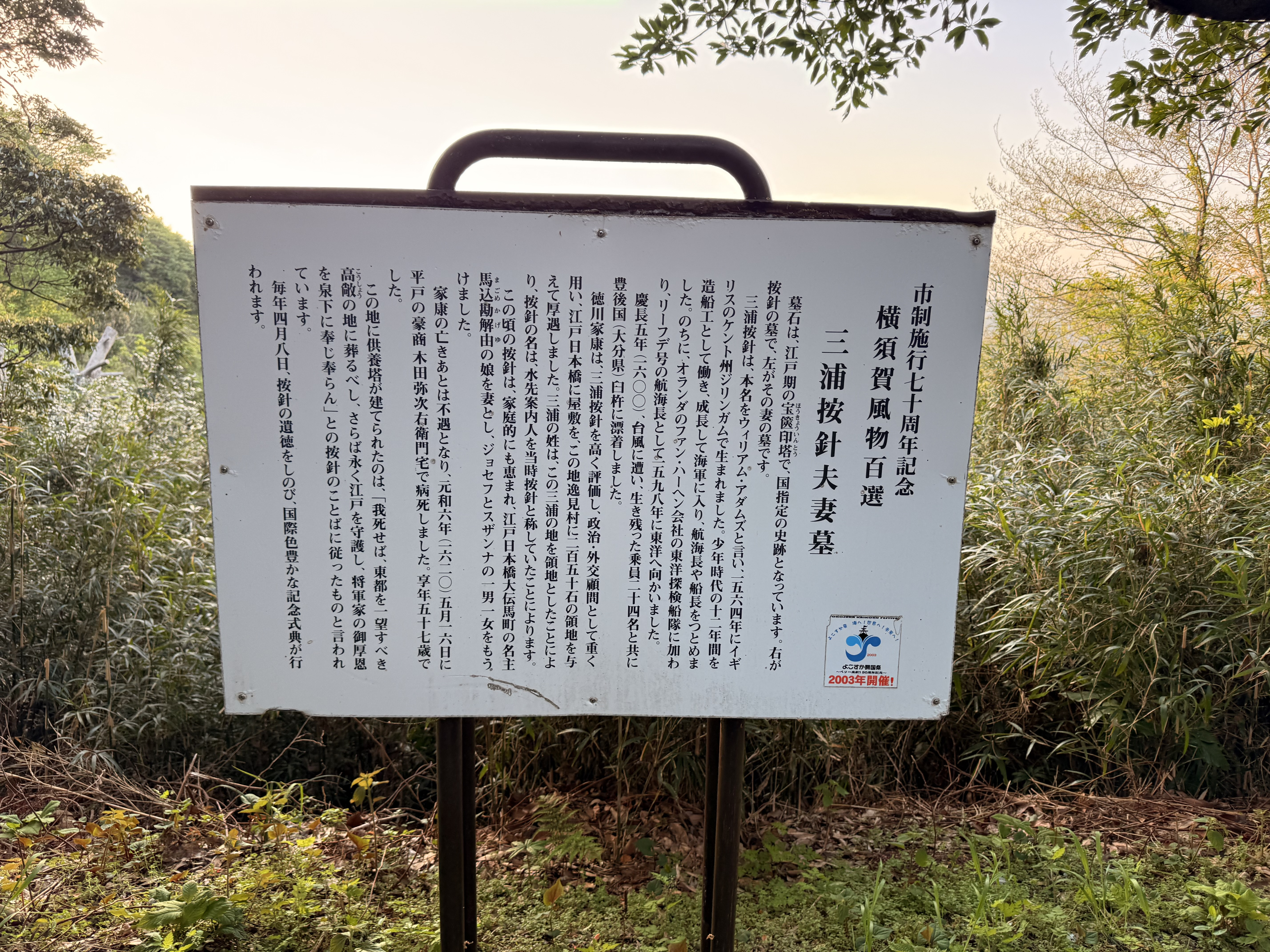
Sign in Japanese about Miura Anjin and his life at the memorial site.

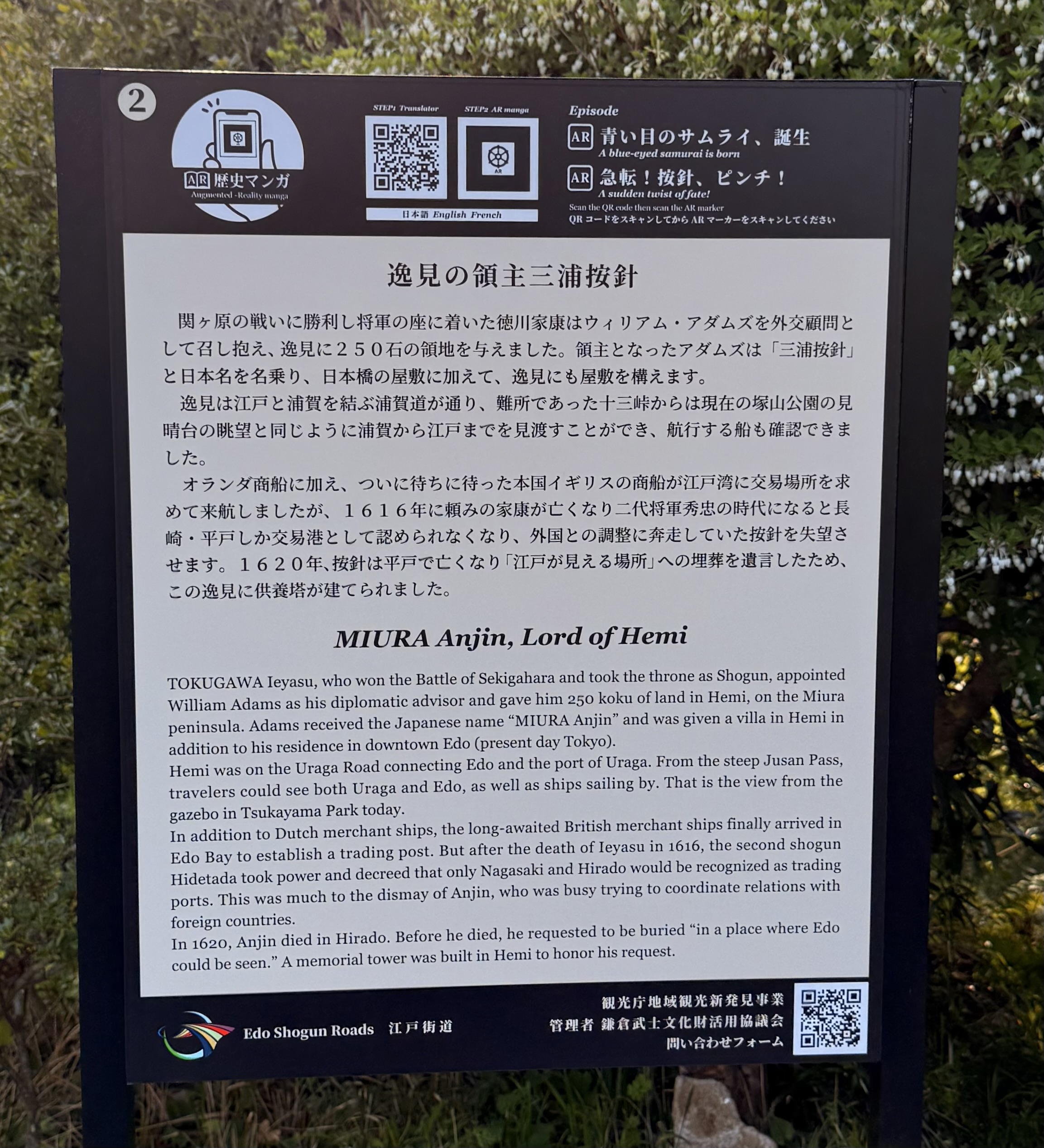
Sign in English and Japanese about Miura Anjin

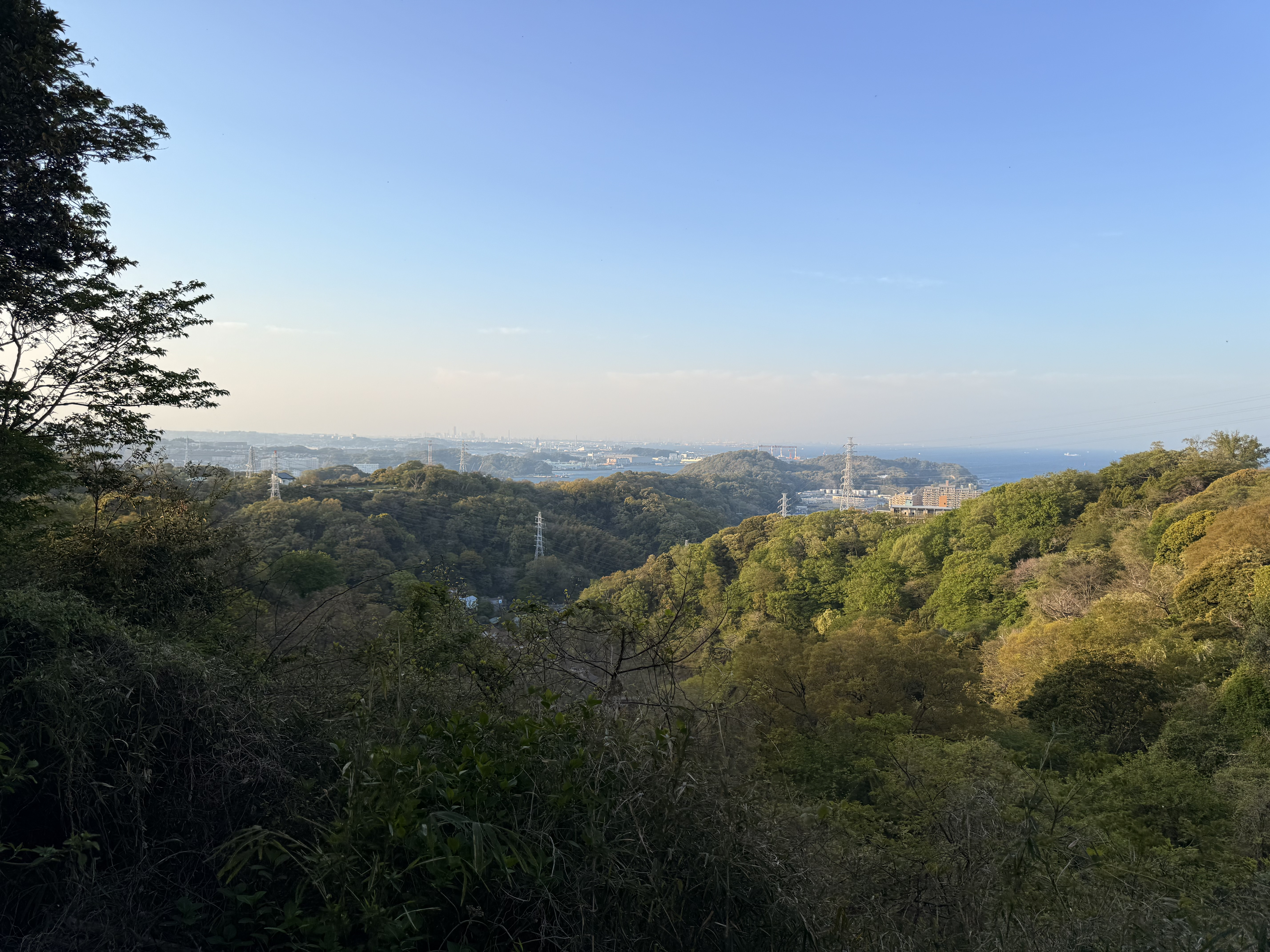
View of the ocean from the memorial site of William Adams, Miura, Japan. Adams wished that after he died, the winds from his homeland, England, could blow over him.

== See also ==
- Jan Joosten van Lodensteijn
- Anglo-Japanese relations
- Hasekura Tsunenaga
- Ernest Mason Satow
- List of foreign-born samurai in Japan
- List of Westerners who visited Japan before 1868
- Yasuke
- Wakita Naokata
- Rinoie Motohiro
- Yagyū Shume

== Appendix ==
=== Bibliography ===
- De Lange, William, Pars Japonica: The First Dutch Expedition to Reach the Shores of Japan (2006)
- England's Earliest Intercourse with Japan, by C. W. Hillary (1905)
- Letters written by the English Residents in Japan, ed. by N. Murakami (1900, containing Adams's Letters reprinted from Memorials of the Empire of Japan, ed. by T. Rundall, Hakluyt Society, 1850)
- Diary of Richard Cocks, with preface by N. Murakami (1899, reprinted from the Hakluyt Society ed. 1883)
- Hildreth, Richard, Japan as it was and is (1855)
- John Harris, Navigantium atque Itinerantium Bibliotheca (1764), i. 856
- Voyage of John Saris, edited by Sir Ernest M. Satow (Hakluyt Society, 1900)
- Asiatic Society of Japan Transactions, xxvi. (sec. 1898) pp. I and 194, where four formerly unpublished letters of Adams are printed;
- Collection of State Papers; East Indies, China and Japan. The MS. of his logs written during his voyages to Siam and China is in the Bodleian Library at Oxford.
- William Adams and Early English Enterprise in Japan, by Anthony Farrington and Derek Massarella
- Milton, Giles (2011). Samurai William: The Adventurer Who Unlocked Japan. Hachette UK. ISBN 978-1-4447-3177-4.
- Henry Smith (1980). Shogun: Japanese History and Western Fantasy (PDF). Asian Studies University of California. pp. 7–13.
- Adams the Pilot: The Life and Times of Captain William Adams: 1564–1620, by William Corr, Curzon Press, 1995 ISBN 1-873410-44-1
- The English Factory in Japan 1613–1623, ed. by Anthony Farrington, British Library, 1991. (Includes all of William Adams's extant letters, as well as his will.)
- A World Elsewhere. Europe's Encounter with Japan in the Sixteenth and Seventeenth Centuries, by Derek Massarella, Yale University Press, 1990.
- Recollections of Japan, Hendrik Doeff, ISBN 1-55395-849-7
- Clulow, Adam (2025). "In the Service of the Shogun: The Real Story of William Adams by Frederik Cryns (review)". Monumenta Nipponica. 80 (1). Sophia University: 122–125. doi:10.1353/mni.2025.a969409. eISSN 0027-0741. ISSN 1880-1390.
- Cryns, Frederik (2024). In the Service of the Shogun: The Real Story of William Adams. Reaktion Books. ISBN 9781789148886.

=== Hardcopy ===
- The Needle-Watcher: The Will Adams Story, British Samurai by Richard Blaker
- Servant of the Shogun by Richard Tames. Paul Norbury Publications, Tenterden, Kent, England.ISBN 0 904404 39 0.
- Samurai William: The Englishman Who Opened Japan, by Giles Milton; ISBN 978-0-14-200378-7; December 2003
