= Cornelis Matelief de Jonge =

Dutch admiral (c. 1569–1632)

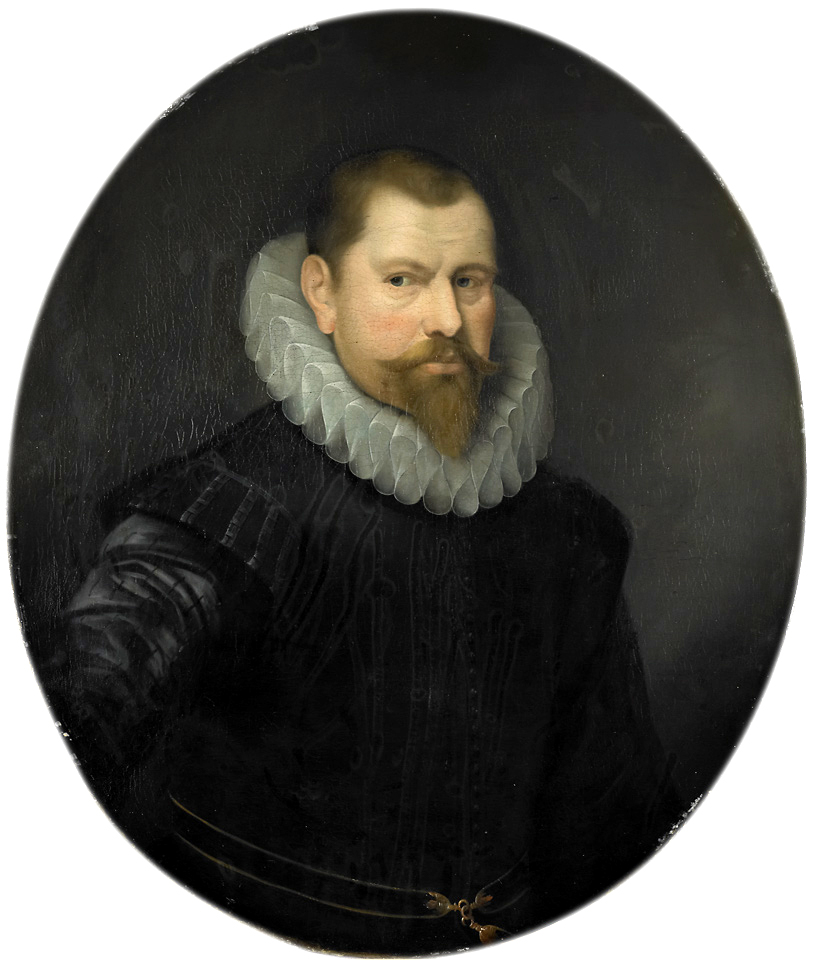
Portrait of de Jonge painted around 1700 by Pieter van der Werff

Cornelis Matelief (or Matelieff) de Jonge (c. 1569 – 17 October 1632) was a Dutch admiral who was active in establishing Dutch power in Southeast Asia during the beginning of the 17th century. His fleet was officially on a trading mission, but its true intent was to destroy Portuguese power in the area. The fleet had 1400 men on board, including 600 soldiers. Matelieff did not succeed in this. The Dutch would ultimately gain control of Malacca more than thirty years later, again joining forces with the Sultanate of Johor, and a new ally Aceh, in 1641. He was born and died in Rotterdam.

== Account ==
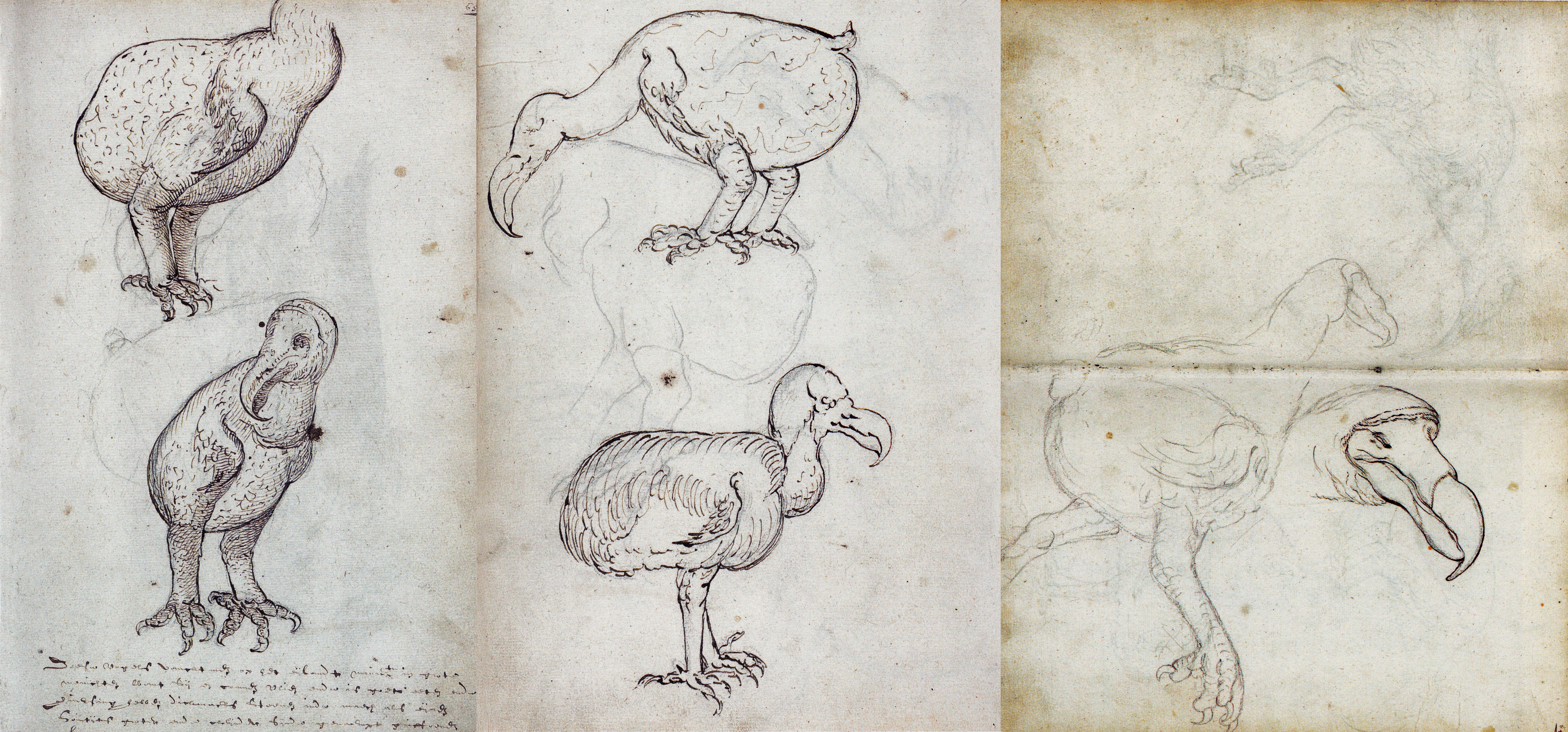
Drawings of the dodo from the travel journal of VOC-ship 'Gelderland' (1601–1603)

Born in Rotterdam, Matelief was put in command of a fleet of eleven ships of the Dutch East India Company with the destination of Malacca. Malacca then was an inconvenient stronghold for non-Portuguese ships heading for the Indonesian Archipelago, China or Japan. The fleet set sail from Zeeland on 12 May 1605. It was the third (?) such fleet from the Dutch East Indies Company to visit Malacca. Matelieff met with Steven van der Hagen on the island of Mauritius for a briefing in January 1606. As one of the first, Matelieff described the black rat, the dodo and the macaque monkey. Also his description of the vegetation of the island are most important.

He reached Malacca in April 1606. In May Matelief de Jonge formed a formal pact with the ruler of Johor, Sultan Alauddin Riayat Shah III, to expel the Portuguese. In exchange, the Dutch would get Malacca for themselves and would be able to conduct trade with Johor. The Dutch and the Malay also agreed to tolerate each other's religion.

=== First battle of Malacca (August 1606) ===
Matelief laid siege to the Portuguese-held Malacca for several months, but was repulsed on land by Portuguese troops under André Furtado de Mendonça and their allies, a contingent of Japanese samurai from Red seal ships. A very large Portuguese fleet under Dom Martim Afonso de Castro, the Viceroy of Goa, arrived on the scene with twenty Portuguese ships on 14 August 1606.

The two fleets fought from 17 August. Nassau was boarded by Santa Cruz and Nossa Senhora da Conceição. Matelief, onboard Orange, went to the rescue but collided with another Dutch ship, Middelburg. These two ships were then attacked by São Salvador and Dom Duarte de Guerra's galleon. Orange managed to break free, but the two Portuguese ships and the Middelburg all caught fire and sank in the action. The Santa Cruz and Conceição eventually managed to set the Nassau on fire, leading to an explosion that sank her.

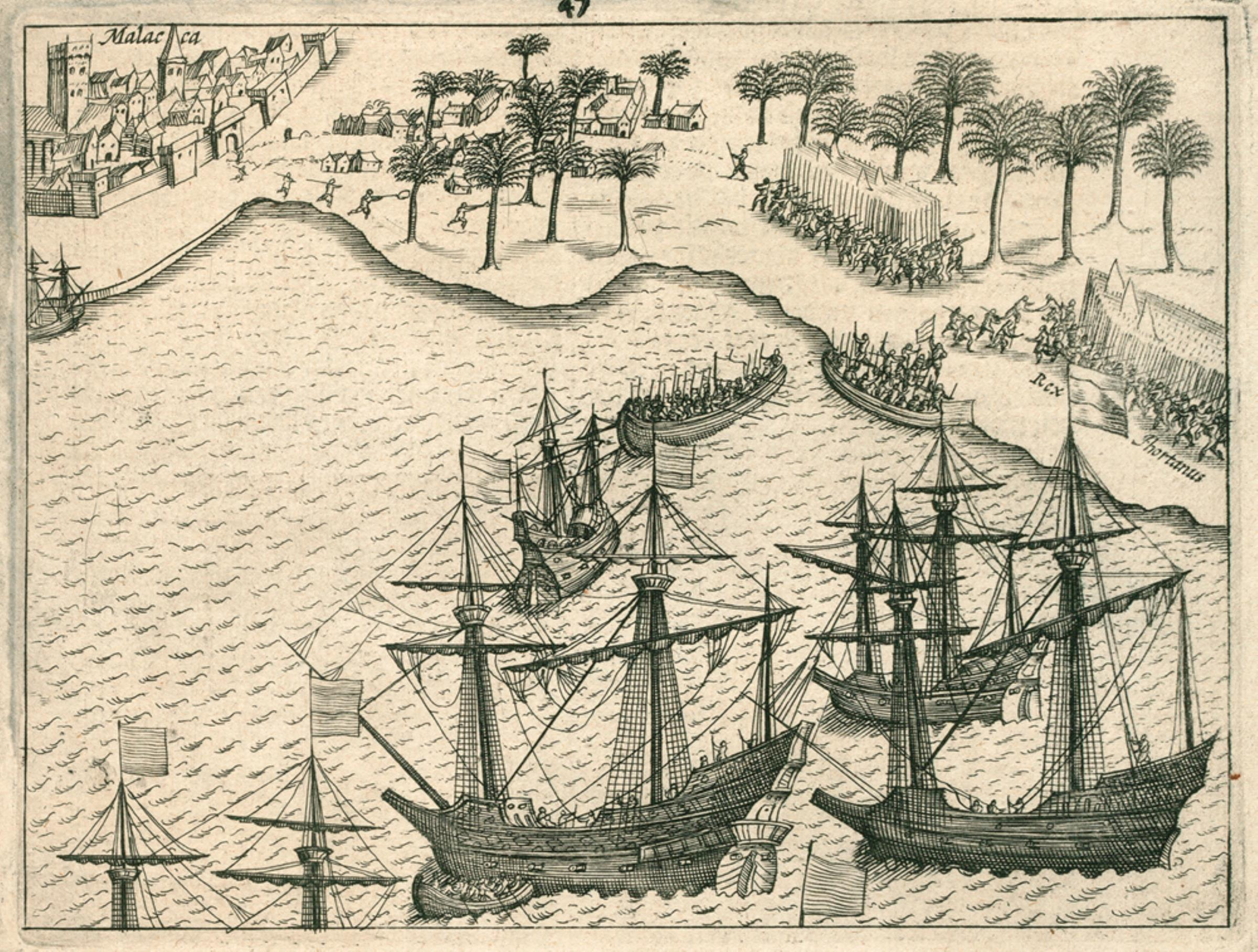
Matelief landing troops in Malacca in 1606

Matelief decided to withdraw from the action, with 150 dead on the Dutch side, and around 500 on the Portuguese side. On 19 August 1606 he obtained permission from the Sultan of Johor to anchor his fleet for repairs in the Johor River.

=== Second battle of Malacca (September 1606) ===
Matelief came back to the scene of the first battle about a month later. Castro had sailed away, leaving only ten Portuguese ships before Malacca. Matelief attacked the ships and managed to sink or burn every single one of them, on 21 September 1606. At the end of his trip Matelieff had lost six ships.

Matelieff sailed in one ship from Ternate to Canton, and on 4 June 1607 he captured a Chinese junk, loaded with spices from Banda. When six Portuguese ships under André Pessoa showed up in front of the Chinese coast, he went back, without an agreement with China or reaching Japan. Matelieff arrived unsuccessfully on Bantam on 24 November 1607, and sent Willem Jansz with secret instructions to Banda to forestall the English ships. He left Bantam on 28 January 1608.

=== Return to Europe with a Siamese embassy (1608) ===
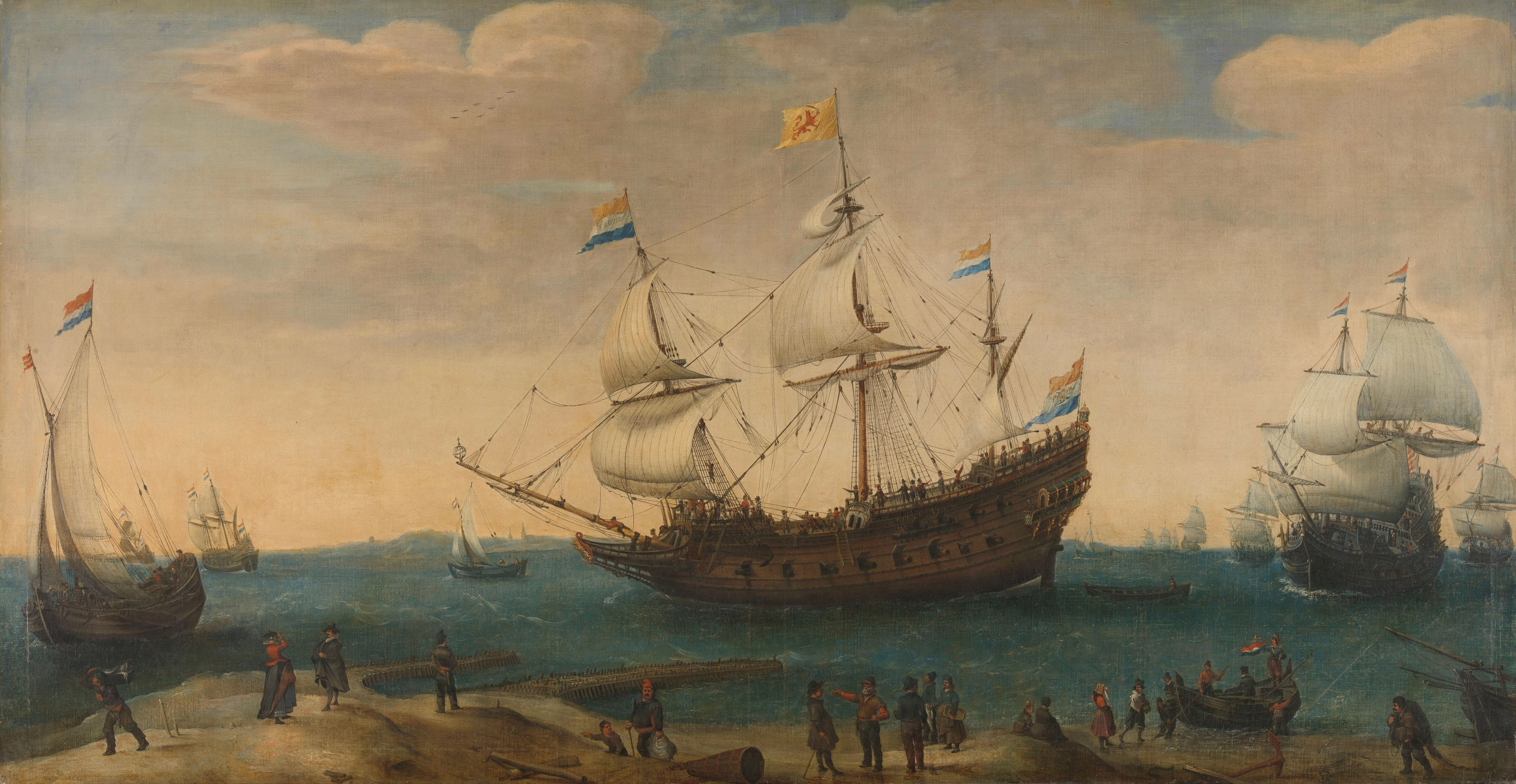
The Mauritius by Hendrick Cornelisz Vroom (1600)

Matelieff returned to Europe in 1608 with Cornelius Specx, a Dutchman who had established a factory in Ayutthaya in 1604. Together with them was an embassy of 16 peoples from the Kingdom of Siam sent by the Siamese ruler Ekathotsarot. The embassy was brought to Holland by Matelief onboard Orange. They arrived in The Hague on 10 September 1608. There the embassy met with Maurice of Nassau, Prince of Orange. Following this, a treaty was concluded between the Dutch Republic and Siam in 1617.

In 1618 Matelieff was appointed in the vroedschap of Rotterdam, later as a burgemeester of the city. In 1625 he lost his function as a deputy in the States-General when staying too long in Warsaw.
