= 1664 =

1664 in various calendars
- Gregorian calendar: 1664; MDCLXIV
- Ab urbe condita: 2417
- Armenian calendar: 1113; ԹՎ ՌՃԺԳ
- Assyrian calendar: 6414
- Balinese saka calendar: 1585–1586
- Bengali calendar: 1070–1071
- Berber calendar: 2614
- English Regnal year: 15 Cha. 2 – 16 Cha. 2
- Buddhist calendar: 2208
- Burmese calendar: 1026
- Byzantine calendar: 7172–7173
- Chinese calendar: 癸卯年 (Water Rabbit); 4361 or 4154 — to — 甲辰年 (Wood Dragon); 4362 or 4155
- Coptic calendar: 1380–1381
- Discordian calendar: 2830
- Ethiopian calendar: 1656–1657
- Hebrew calendar: 5424–5425
- Hindu calendars
- Vikram Samvat: 1720–1721
- Shaka Samvat: 1585–1586
- Kali Yuga: 4764–4765
- Holocene calendar: 11664
- Igbo calendar: 664–665
- Iranian calendar: 1042–1043
- Islamic calendar: 1074–1075
- Japanese calendar: Kanbun 4 (寛文４年)
- Javanese calendar: 1586–1587
- Julian calendar: Gregorian minus 10 days
- Korean calendar: 3997
- Minguo calendar: 248 before ROC 民前248年
- Nanakshahi calendar: 196
- Thai solar calendar: 2206–2207
- Tibetan calendar: ཆུ་མོ་ཡོས་ལོ་ (female Water-Hare); 1790 or 1409 or 637 — to — ཤིང་ཕོ་འབྲུག་ལོ་ (male Wood-Dragon); 1791 or 1410 or 638

September 8: The Dutch city of New Amsterdam, capital of the colony of New Netherland, is surrendered to invading English Army troops, who rename the city and the colony "New York" for The Duke of York.

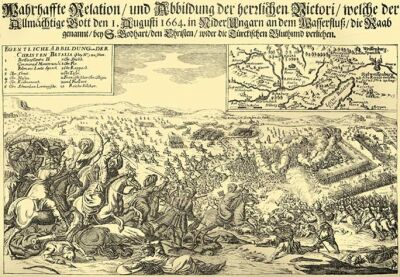
August 1: Battle of Saint Gotthard

1664 (MDCLXIV) was a leap year starting on Tuesday of the Gregorian calendar and a leap year starting on Friday of the Julian calendar, the 1664th year of the Common Era (CE) and Anno Domini (AD) designations, the 664th year of the 2nd millennium, the 64th year of the 17th century, and the 5th year of the 1660s decade. As of the start of 1664, the Gregorian calendar was 10 days ahead of the Julian calendar, which remained in localized use until 1923.

== Events ==
=== January–March ===
- January 5 – Battle of Surat in India: The Maratha leader, Chhatrapati Shivaji, defeats the Mughal Army Captain Inayat Khan, and sacks Surat.
- January 7 – Indian entrepreneur Virji Vora, described in the 17th century by the English East India Company as the richest merchant in the world, suffers the loss of a large portion of his wealth when the Maratha troops of Shivaji plunder his residence at Surat and his business warehouses.
- February 2 – Jesuit missionary Johann Grueber arrives in Rome after a 214-day journey that had started in Beijing, proving that commerce can be had between Europe and Asia by land rather than ship.
- February 12 – The Treaty of Pisa is signed between France and the Papal States to bring an end to the Corsican Guard Affair that began on August 20, 1662, when the French ambassador was shot and killed by soldiers in the employ of Pope Alexander VII.
- February 14 – A peace treaty is signed in Turin in Italy to end the War of the Banished between the Duchy of Savoy and the Waldensians.
- February 26 – Alexandre de Prouville de Tracy, appointed by King Louis XIV of France as Lieutenant Général of the Americas, departs from the port of La Rochelle with 1,200 men and seven ships to expand France's property in the Caribbean Sea and in South America.
- March 12 – King Charles II of England makes royal charter for territory in North America that leases to his brother, James, Duke of York, a patent for a large amount of land in what is now the northeastern United States. According to the Charter, James receives "all that part of the mayne land of New England" between "New Scotland in America" and the river of Kenebeque", along with "Mattowacks or Long Island" and "Martins Vineyard and Nantukes", and the lands between the "Connecticutte and Hudsons rivers" and the lands "from the west side of "Connecticutte to the east side De la Warre Bay". The lease, which includes the territory claimed by the Dutch Republic as New Netherland is for most of the U.S. state of Maine and parts of Connecticut, New York, New Jersey and Pennsylvania.
- March 19 – Polish astronomer Jan Heweliusz becomes the first native of Poland to be inducted into England's Royal Society.

=== April–June ===
- April 14 – All grants to the Compagnie des Isles de l'Amerique for development of French-claimed islands in the Caribbean Sea are revoked by King Louis XIV, including the rights to the islands of Martinique and Saint Lucia that had been sold to Marie Bonnard du Parquet prior to her death in 1659.
- April 25 – King Charles II of England empowers the Royal Commission of 1664, a delegation consisting of Richard Nicolls and three others, to travel to North America to capture New Netherland and assert royal authority in the Puritan New England Colonies.
- April 28 – Juan Alonso de Cuevas y Dávalos is appointed as the new Roman Catholic Archbishop of Mexico by Pope Alexander VII, to allow Archbishop Mateo de Sagade de Bugueyro to return to Spain. Archbishop Cuevas is installed on November 15 upon his arrival in Mexico City.
- May 9 – Robert Hooke discovers Jupiter's Great Red Spot.
- May 12 – The original version of Tartuffe, a comedy by French playwright and actor Molière, is given its first performance, staged at the Palace of Versailles
- May 15 – Guerin Spranger, commander of the Dutch fortress at Cayenne in South America, surrenders without a fight to French commander Alexandre de Prouville de Tracy and 1,200 employees of the Compagnie de la France équinoxiale, giving France control of the territory that becomes the colony of French Guiana.
- May 28 – King Louis XIV of France establishes the Compagnie des Indes Occidentales by royal decree to replace the recently cancelled Compagnie des Isles de l'Amerique.
- June 3 – In the city of Mantua in Italy, the world's oldest continuously published private newspaper, Gazzetta di Mantova, publishes its first-known issue. The newspaper would celebrate its 350th anniversary in 2014.
- June 5 – The siege of the Croatian fortress at Novi Zrin (located near the village of Donja Dubrava in Croatia near its border with Hungary). After a 32-day defense, the Croatian defenders surrender to troops of the Ottoman Empire.
- June 9 – Kronenbourg Brewery (Brasseries Kronenbourg) is founded in Strasbourg.
- June 24 – The Second Anglo-Dutch War carries over to North America as soldiers of the English Army invade the Dutch colony of New Netherland, promised by King Charles II of England to his brother, the Duke of York.

=== July–September ===
- August 1 – Battle of Saint Gotthard: The Ottoman Empire is defeated by a Habsburg army, led by Raimondo Montecuccoli, leading to the Peace of Vasvár.
- August 11 – Sir John Lisle, a former member of the English House of Commons who had been designated a regicide for his role in signing the death warrant in the execution in 1649 of Charles I of England, is assassinated in a church courtyard in Lausanne in Switzerland. Lisle had gone into exile after the restoration of the monarchy in 1660. The shooting of Lisle, done on order of King Charles II, is carried out by a team led by royal agent James Cotter.
- August 27 – The French East India Company (Compagnie des Indes Orientales) is founded.
- September 8 (August 29 O.S.) – Peter Stuyvesant, Director-General of the Dutch Republic colony of New Netherland, surrenders New Amsterdam to an English naval squadron, commanded by Colonel Richard Nicolls, without bloodshed.
- September 23 – The French Navy ship Tigre sinks off of the coast of the island of Sardinia, with the loss of 64 men. Another 58 of the crew are rescued.

=== October–December ===
- October 4 – New Netherland is captured by England. The English promptly rename the fledgling city New York, after the Duke of York (later King James II).
- October 28 – The "Duke of York and Albany's maritime regiment of foot" is formed in London and serves as a precursor to the Royal Marines of the United Kingdom.
- October 31 – Surrounded by a Berber army, the French Navy evacuates the presidio of Jijel, a Mediterranean Sea port in what is now the Republic of Algeria, after having captured it from the Algiers Regency on June 12.
- November 6 – The oldest hospital in India, the Government General Hospital, is opened at Madras by the English East India Company for the treatment of ill soldiers.
- November 17 – Latvian colonist Jacob Kettler, Duke of Courland, gives up all of his rights to his African colony at St Andrew's Island in the Gambia River to representatives of King Charles II, in return for keeping possession of the Caribbean island of Tobago.
- December 3 – The English warships HMS Nonsuch and HMS Phoenix are wrecked in a storm at Gibraltar.
- December 20 – All but 3 members of the over 200-person crew of the Dutch ship Kennemerland are killed when the trade ship sinks in a storm near the Out Skerries islands off of the coast of Scotland.

=== Date unknown ===
- Austere reforms introduced in the Cistercian La Trappe Abbey in Normandy by Armand de Rancé, origin of the Trappists.
- John Evelyn's Sylva, or A Discourse of Forest-Trees and the Propagation of Timber is published in London, in book form.

== Births ==
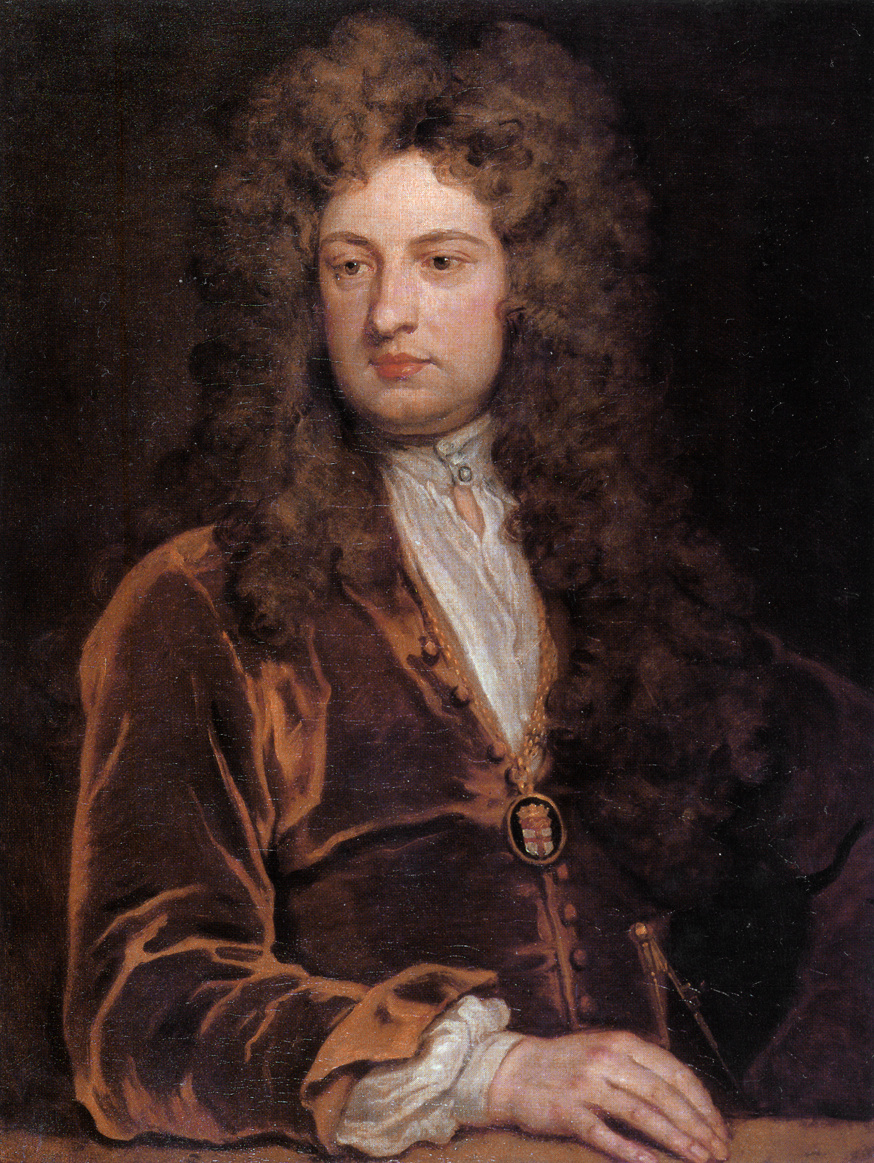
John Vanbrugh

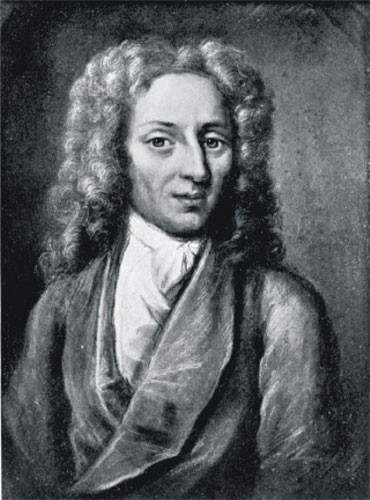
Nicolas Fatio de Duillier

- January 1 – Alvise Pisani, 114th Doge of Venice (d. 1741)
- January 4 – Lars Roberg, Swedish physician (d. 1742)
- January 14
  - Johann Jakob Schudt, German theologian (d. 1722)
  - Simon van Slingelandt, Grand Pensionary of Holland (d. 1736)
- January 15 – Jean Meslier, French Catholic priest, later discovered to have promoted atheism (d. 1729)
- January 17 – Antonio Salvi, Italian poet (d. 1724)
- January 20 – Giovanni Vincenzo Gravina, Italian writer and jurist (d. 1718)
- January 24 – John Vanbrugh, English architect and dramatist (d. 1726)
- February 6 – Mustafa II, Ottoman Sultan (d. 1703)
- February 8 – William Seymour, British politician (d. 1728)
- February 13 – Teodor Andrzej Potocki, Polish noble (d. 1738)
- February 23 – Georg Dietrich Leyding, German composer and organist (d. 1710)
- February 24 (baptized) – Thomas Newcomen, English inventor (d. 1729)
- February 26 – Nicolas Fatio de Duillier, Swiss mathematician (d. 1753)
- March 4 – Juan de Esteyneffer, Moravian German lay Jesuit missionary sent to the New World (d. 1716)
- March 11 – Jørgen Otto Brockenhuus, Dano-Norwegian officer (d. 1728)
- March 12 – Moritz Wilhelm, Duke of Saxe-Zeitz (d. 1718)
- March 14 – Silvio Stampiglia, Italian poet and opera librettist (d. 1725)
- March 17 – Georg Österreich, German composer and music collector (d. 1735)
- March 20 – Johann Homann, German cartographer (d. 1724)
- April 5 – Élisabeth Thérèse de Lorraine, French noblewoman, Princess of Epinoy by marriage (d. 1748)
- April 6
  - Arvid Horn, Swedish politician (d. 1742)
  - Gustaf Cronhielm, Swedish politician (d. 1737)
- April 11 – Pierce Lewis, Welsh cleric who helped to "correct" the 1690 edition of the Welsh Bible (d. 1699)
- April 14 – Ulrik Adolf Holstein, Danish nobleman and statesman (d. 1737)
- April 30 – François Louis, Prince of Conti, French general (d. 1709)
- May 6 – Bhai Bachittar Singh, Indian Sikh martyr (d. 1705)
- May 10 – Tørres Christensen, Norwegian merchant (d. 1721)
- May 20 – Andreas Schlüter, German architect and sculptor (d. 1714)
- May 30 – Giulio Alberoni, Italian cardinal and statesman (d. 1754)
- June 3 – Rachel Ruysch, painter from the Northern Netherlands (d. 1750)
- June 7
  - Edward Harley, English politician (d. 1735)
  - Henry Dawnay, 2nd Viscount Downe, Irish peer (d. 1741)
- June 22 – Johann Ernst III, Duke of Saxe-Weimar (d. 1707)
- June 24 – François Pourfour du Petit, French anatomist, ophthalmologist and surgeon (d. 1741)
- June 28 – Nicolas Bernier, French composer (d. 1734)
- July 3 – James Stanley, 10th Earl of Derby, English politician (d. 1736)
- July 11 – James Ogilvy, 4th Earl of Findlater (d. 1730)
- July 16 – Philippe Charles, Duke of Valois (d. 1666)
- July 18 – Count Palatine Francis Louis of Neuburg, Hochmeister of the Teutonic Order (d. 1732)
- July 21 – Matthew Prior, English poet and diplomat (d. 1721)
- August 2 – Philip Reinhard, Count of Hanau-Münzenberg (d. 1712)
- August 4 – Louis Lully, French composer (d. 1734)
- August 12 – Magnus Stenbock, Swedish noble (d. 1717)
- August 20 – János Pálffy, Hungarian field marshal, Palatine (d. 1751)
- August 24
  - Christen Thomesen Sehested, Danish admiral (d. 1736)
  - Willem Adriaan van der Stel, Dutch colonial administrator (d. 1733)
- September 5
  - Charlotte Lee, Countess of Lichfield, illegitimate daughter of King Charles II of England (d. 1718)
  - Vincenzo Ludovico Gotti, Italian Catholic cardinal (d. 1742)
  - Louis Antoine de Pardaillan de Gondrin, French duke (d. 1736)
- September 7
  - Johann Georg von Eckhart, German historian (d. 1730)
  - Thomas Morgan, English politician (d. 1700)
- September 9 – Johann Christoph Pez, German composer (d. 1716)
- September 14 – John Blackadder, Scottish soldier (d. 1729)
- September 18 – Anton Maria Maragliano, Italian artist (d. 1739)
- October 3 – Giuseppe Alberti, Italian painter (d. 1716)
- October 12 – Praskovia Saltykova, Russian tsarina (d. 1723)
- October 16 – Abraham Alewijn, Dutch playwright (d. 1721)
- October 18 – George Compton, 4th Earl of Northampton (d. 1727)
- October 27 – Thomas Johnson, English politician (d. 1728)
- October 31 – Sir Wilfrid Lawson, 2nd Baronet, of Isell, English politician (d. 1704)
- November 9
  - Johann Speth, German composer (d. 1719)
  - Henry Wharton, English writer (d. 1695)
- November 12 – Marie-Jeanne L'Héritier, French writer (d. 1734)
- November 16 – Louise Marie Thérèse, French Benedictine nun (d. 1732)
- November 18 – Charles of Mecklenburg-Güstrow, Duke of Mecklenburg (d. 1688)
- November 24 – Margherita Maria Farnese, Italian noblewoman (d. 1718)
- December 10 – John Williams, American clergy (d. 1729)
- December 13 – Countess Charlotte Johanna of Waldeck-Wildungen, German noblewoman (d. 1699)
- December 15 – Azim-ush-Shan, Mughal prince (d. 1712)
- December 17 – Henry Bayntun, English politician (d. 1691)
- December 26 – Johann Melchior Dinglinger, German goldsmith (d. 1731)
- date unknown – Johanna Dorothea Lindenaer, Dutch writer and agent (d. 1737)
  - Catherine Jérémie, French-Canadian botanist (d. 1744)
  - Maria Guyomar de Pinha, Siamese cook (d. 1728)

== Deaths ==
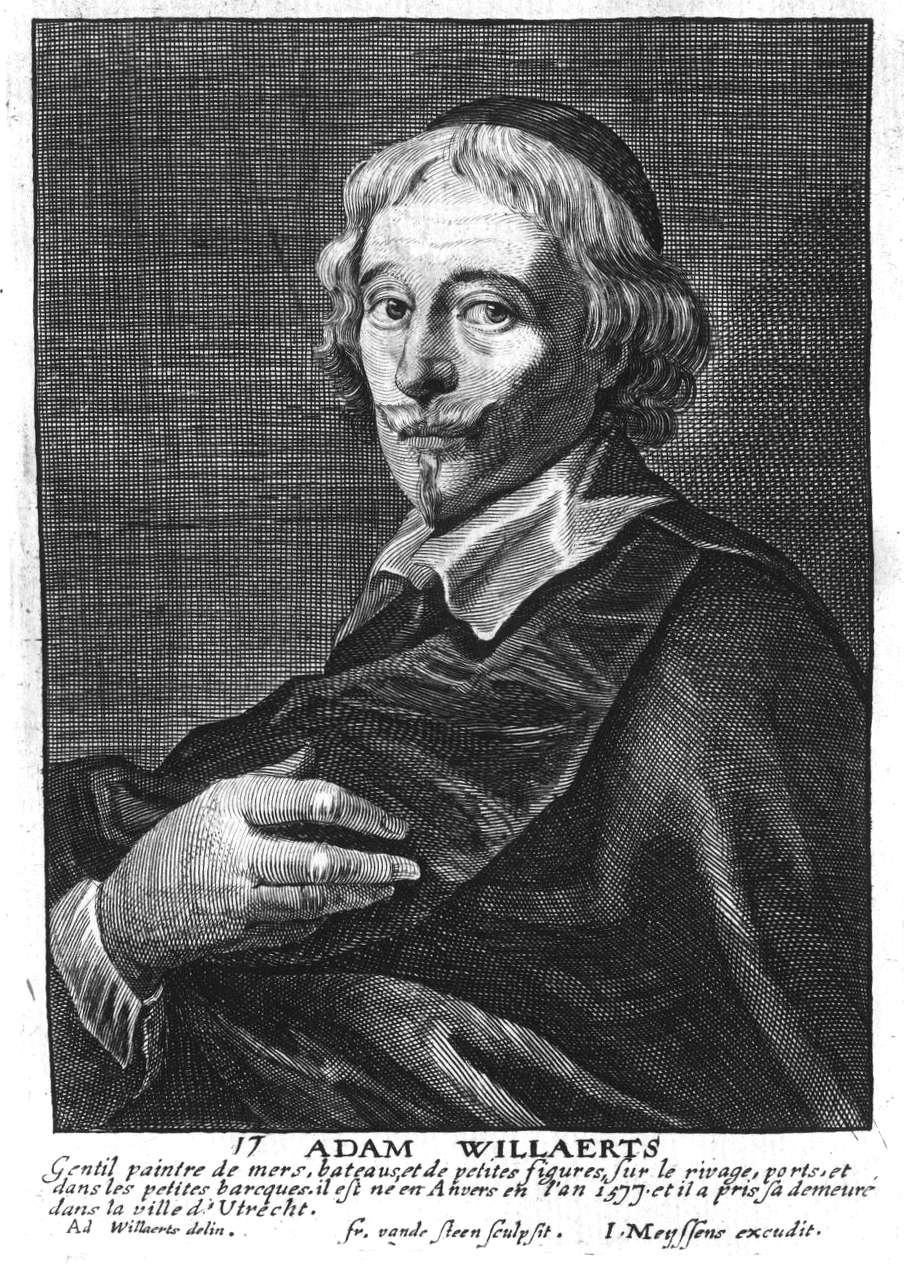
Adam Willaerts

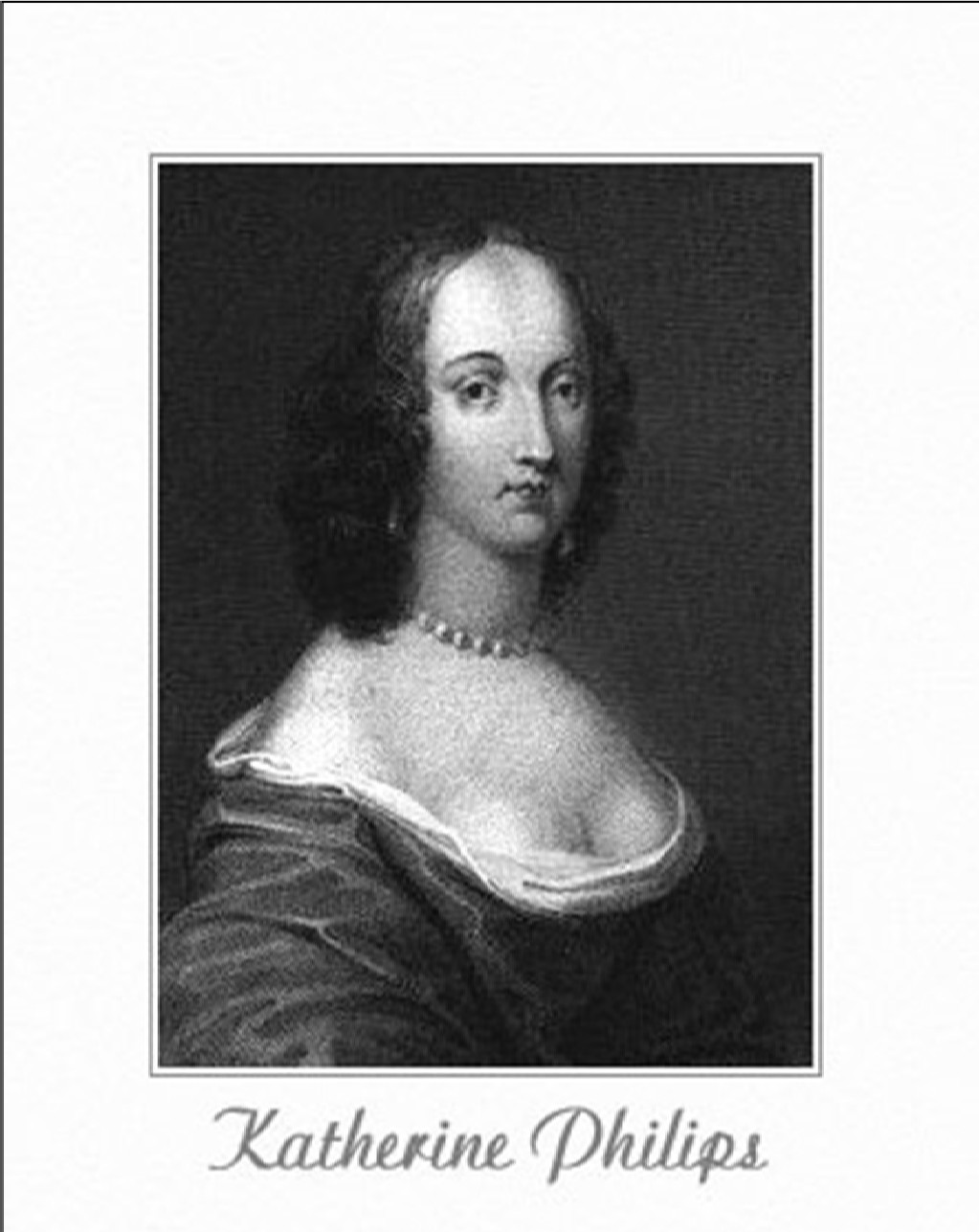
Katherine Philips
- January 10 – Antoon Sanders, Dutch priest and historian (b. 1586)
- January 14 – Françoise Madeleine d'Orléans, French princess (b. 1648)
- January 27 – Archduke Charles Joseph of Austria, Roman Catholic bishop (b. 1649)
- January 30 – Cornelis de Graeff, Dutch mayor (b. 1599)
- February 16 – Sir John Trelawny, 1st Baronet, British baronet (b. 1592)
- February 20 – Corfitz Ulfeldt, Danish statesman (b. 1606)
- February 26 – Emmanuel Stupanus, Swiss physician (b. 1587)
- March 7 – Bernhard von Mallinckrodt, German bibliophile (b. 1591)
- March 16 – Ivan Vyhovsky, Ukrainian Cossack leader
- March 19 – Francisco de Araujo, Spanish theologian (b. 1580)
- March 30 – Guru Har Krishan, 8th Guru of Sikhism (b. 1656)
- March 31 – Charlotte Stanley, Countess of Derby, English defender of Latham House (b. 1599)
- April 4 – Adam Willaerts, Dutch painter (b. 1577)
- April 24 – Silvius I Nimrod, Duke of Württemberg-Oels (b. 1622)
- May 19 – Elisabeth de Bourbon-Vendôme, French princess (b. 1614)
- May 21 – Elizabeth Poole, Puritan and business woman (b. c. 1599)
- June 1 – Michiel Sweerts, Flemish painter (b. 1618)
- June 2 – Henri II, Duke of Guise (b. 1614)
- June 22 – Katherine Philips, Anglo-Welsh poet (b. 1631)
- July – Jan Janssonius, Dutch cartographer (b. 1588)
- July 4 – George III of Brieg, Duke of Brzeg (1633–1664) (b. 1611)
- July 15 – Abraham Ecchellensis, Lebanese Maronite philosopher (b. 1605)
- July 12 – Stefano della Bella, Italian printmaker (b. 1610)
- July 16 – Andreas Gryphius, German writer (b. 1616)
- July 19 – Egbert van der Poel, Dutch painter (b. 1621)
- July 31 – Goschwin Nickel, Jesuit leader (b. 1582)
- August 3 – Jacopo Vignali, Italian painter (b. 1592)
- August 16 – Johannes Buxtorf II, Swiss theologian (b. 1599)
- August 23 – Jean Bagot, French theologian (b. 1591)
- August 24 – Maria Cunitz, Silesian astronomer (b. 1610)
- August 27 – Francisco de Zurbarán, Spanish painter (b. 1598)
- September 2 – Antoine de Laloubère, French Jesuit mathematician (b. 1600)
- October 31 – William Frederick, Prince of Nassau-Dietz, Dutch stadtholder (b. 1613)
- November 2 – George Ghica, Prince of Moldavia and Wallachia (b. 1600)
- November 17 – Nicolas Perrot d'Ablancourt, Translator (b. 1606)
- November 18 – Miklós Zrínyi, Croatian and Hungarian military leader, statesman (b. 1620)
- December 15 – Dietrich Reinkingk, German lawyer and politician (b. 1590)
- December 25 – Niccolò Ludovisi, Prince of Piombino (b. 1613)
- December 26 – Eleonore Dorothea of Anhalt-Dessau, Duchess of Saxe-Weimar by marriage (b. 1602)
- date unknown – Gu Mei, politically influential Chinese Gējì, poet and painter (b. 1619)
