= Gobat =

Gobat may refer to:

- Charles Albert Gobat (1843–1914), Swiss lawyer, educational administrator, and politician
- George Gobat (1600-1679), French Jesuit theologian
- Maria Gobat (1813–1879), Swiss missionary; wife of Samuel Gobat
- Mayan Smith-Gobat (b. 1979), professional big-wall climber from New Zealand
- Samuel Gobat (1799–1879), Swiss Calvinist who became an Anglican missionary in Africa and was the Protestant Bishop of Jerusalem
