= 1600 =

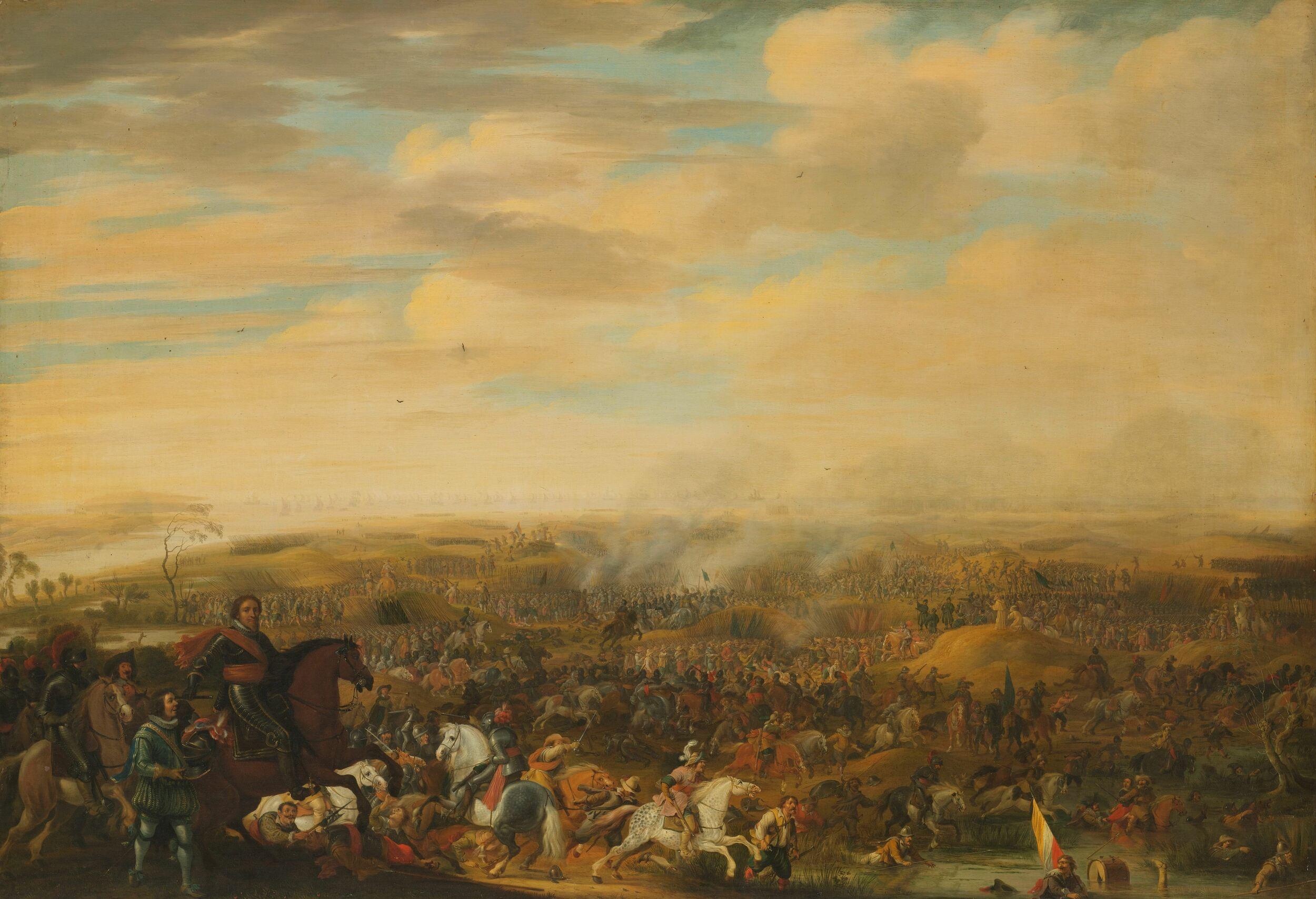
July 2: Dutch Republic defeats Kingdom of Spain in the Battle of Nieuwpoort

1600 (MDC) was a century leap year starting on Saturday of the Gregorian calendar and a leap year starting on Tuesday of the Julian calendar, the 1600th year of the Common Era (CE) and Anno Domini (AD) designations, the 600th year of the 2nd millennium, the 100th and last year of the 16th century, and the 1st year of the 1600s decade. As of the start of 1600, the Gregorian calendar was 10 days ahead of the Julian calendar, which remained in localized use until 1923.

The year 1600 was the end of the 16th century and the start of the 17th century. In the Gregorian calendar, it was the first century leap year and the last until the year 2000.

== Events ==
=== January–March ===
- January 1 – Scotland adopts January 1 as New Year's Day instead of March 25.
- January 20 – Hugh O'Neill, Earl of Tyrone, renews the Nine Years' War (Ireland) against England with an invasion of Munster.
- January 24 – Sebald de Weert makes the first recorded sighting of the Falkland Islands.
- February 17 – On his way to be burned at the stake for heresy in Rome, Giordano Bruno has his tongue "imprisoned" after he refuses to stop talking.
- February 19 – The Huaynaputina volcano in Peru erupts, in what is still the worst recorded volcanic eruption in South America.
- March 20 – Linköping Bloodbath: Five Swedish nobles are publicly executed by decapitation and Polish–Swedish King Sigismund III Vasa is de facto deposed as ruler of Sweden.

=== April–June ===
- April 19 – The first Dutch ship ever to arrive in Japan, the Liefde ("Love"), anchors in Sashifu, in the Bungo Province (modern-day Usuki in Ōita Prefecture). The sailors present on this ship are William Adams, Jan Joosten van Lodensteijn, Jacob Quaeckernaeck and Melchior van Santvoort.
- May 27 – Michael the Brave becomes ruler of Wallachia, Transylvania and Moldavia, formally uniting the three Danubian Principalities under one Romanian ruler.
- June 5 – Robert Devereux, 2nd Earl of Essex, the former Lord Lieutenant of Ireland and Chancellor of the University of Dublin, is put on trial in England before a commission of 18 men, after being charged with malfeasance. He is deprived of his main business, a monopoly on sweet wines, and stripped of his noble title. In revenge, he attempts to organize a coup d'etat to overthrow Queen Elizabeth and fails in his plot.
- June 9 – Yi Hang-bok becomes the new Chief State Councillor of Korea (the Yeonguijeong), equivalent to a prime minister, after being appointed by King Seonjo to replace Yi San-hae.
- June 13 – Barrister Nicholas Fuller is granted the exclusive right in England to manufacture playing cards.
- June 25 – In England, a fire destroys much of the town of North Walsham, Norfolk, burning down 118 homes, 70 shops, and most of the stalls in the market square. The fire is traced to the home of one person who tries to flee town after the blaze begins. Many of the persons left homeless are given shelter at the St Nicholas Church.

=== July–September ===
- July 2 – Eighty Years' War (Dutch War of Independence) – Battle of Nieuwpoort: The Dutch Republic gains a tactical victory over the Spanish Empire.
- August 5 – The brothers Alexander Ruthven and John Ruthven, 3rd Earl of Gowrie, are killed during a failed attempt to kidnap or murder King James VI of Scotland at their home.
- September 18 – The Battle of Mirăslău takes place within Transylvania as Hungarian troops, backed by the Holy Roman Empire, triumph over the Principality of Wallachia, backed by Poland. Hungarian General Giorgio Basta brings 30,000 men against the 22,000 commanded by Wallachia's ruler Michael the Brave. The Wallachians sustain more than 5,000 dead and wounded.
- September 24 – All 130 crew of the Dutch Republic ship Hoop die when the merchantman sinks in a storm while traveling in the Pacific Ocean between the Hawaiian Islands and Japan. The Liefde, a ship accompanying Hoop, is badly damaged but survives; all but 24 of its crew of more than 100 die from starvation and thirst after drifting more than six months before arriving in Japan on April 19, 1601.

=== October–December ===
- October 6 – The première of Jacopo Peri's Euridice, the earliest known fully surviving work of modern opera, takes place in Florence for the wedding of Henry IV of France and Marie de' Medici. Emilio de' Cavalieri stages the production.
- October 8 – The basic legal system for the Republic of San Marino goes into effect during the service of captains regent Girolamo Gozi and Francesco Giannini.
- October 20 – Persian diplomats, led by Husayn 'Ali Beg of Persia, and Englishman Anthony Shirley (who serves as translator) arrive in Prague to meet with Rudolf II, Holy Roman Emperor.
- October 21 – The Battle of Sekigahara occurs in what is now present-day Gifu Prefecture, Japan, where the Eastern Army led by Tokugawa Ieyasu emerges victorious against the Western Army led by Ishida Mitsunari. The battle ends the Sengoku period and grants the Tokugawa clan nominal control over Japan, establishing the Tokugawa shogunate with Tokugawa Ieyasu as shogun.
- November 7 – Emperor Rudolf II grants an audience in Prague to Persian diplomats Husayn 'Ali Beg and Anthony Shirley, and present the offer of Persia's King Abbas the Great to supply weapons to the Empire in their fight against the Ottomans.
- November 15 – Thessaly rebellion: Greek farmers in Thessaly, incited by Bishop Dionysios Skylosophos, begin an uprising against the Ottoman Empire, with violence in an area bounded by Trikala and Karditsa and the surrounding mountains, but the rebellion is suppressed by the Ottomans in a few days.
- December 31 – The East India Company is granted a Royal charter in the Kingdom of England for trade with Asia.

=== Date unknown ===
- Approximate date – The Lutheran orthodox campaign intensifies, to reinforce the Book of Concord.
- Caister Castle in England falls into ruin.
- Sumo wrestling becomes a professional sport in Japan.
- William Shakespeare's plays Henry IV, Part 2, Henry V, The Merchant of Venice, A Midsummer Night's Dream and Much Ado About Nothing are published in London.
- William Gilbert publishes in Latin De Magnete, one of the first significant scientific books published in England, describing the Earth's magnetic field, and the beginning of modern geomagnetism.
- Fabritio Caroso's dance manual Nobiltà de dame is published.

== Births ==
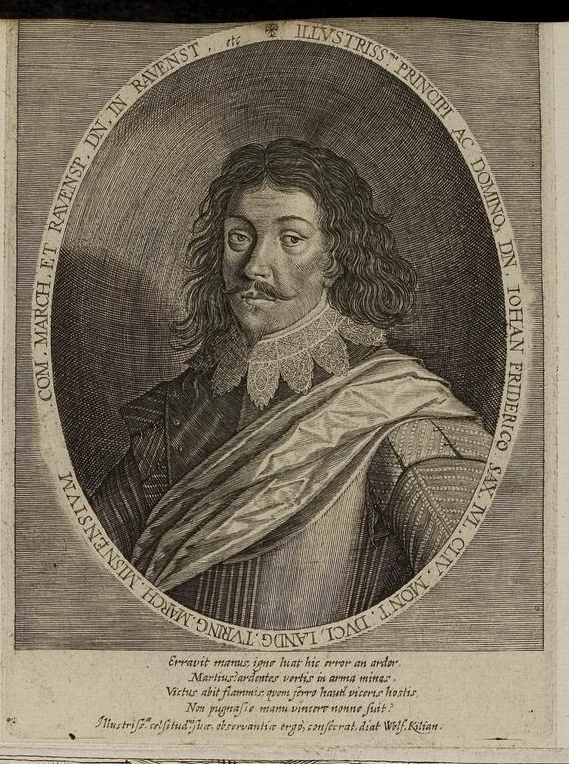
John Frederick, Duke of Saxe-Weimar

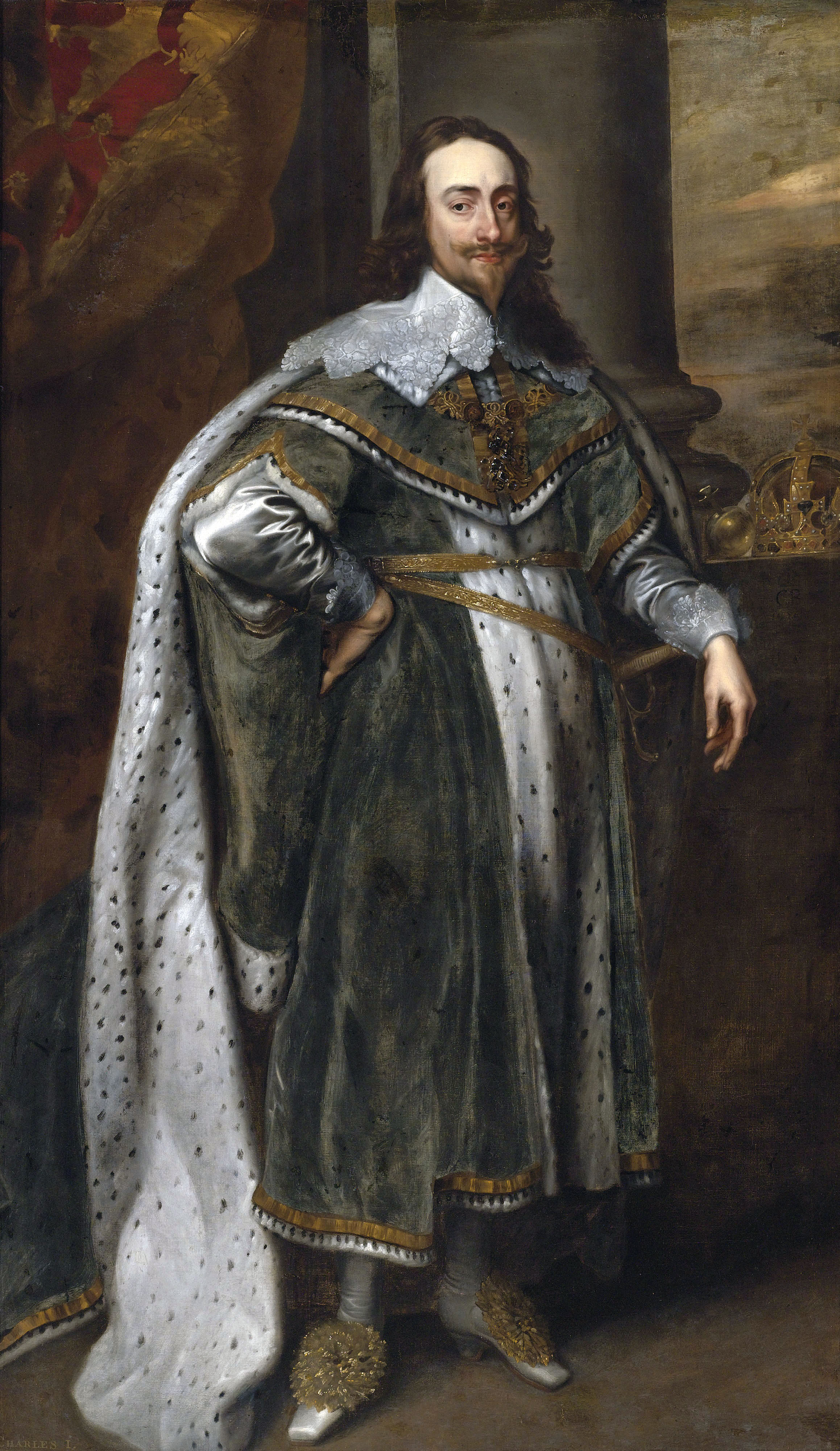
Charles I of England

=== January–March ===
- January 1 – Friedrich Spanheim, Calvinistic theology professor at the University of Leiden (d. 1649)
- January 17 – Pedro Calderón de la Barca, Spanish playwright (d. 1681)
- January 22 – Elisabet Juliana Banér, Swedish noble (d. 1640)
- January 23 – Alexander Keirincx, Flemish painter (d. 1652)
- January 28 – Pope Clement IX (d. 1669)
- February – Edmund Calamy the Elder, English Presbyterian (d. 1666)
- February 1 – Johan Evertsen, Dutch admiral (d. 1666)
- February 2 – Gabriel Naudé, French librarian and scholar (d. 1653)
- February 6 – Matthew Brend, English landowner (d. 1659)
- February 9 – Jean-Joseph Surin, French Jesuit writer (d. 1665)
- February 24 – Manuel António of Portugal, Dutch-Portuguese nobleman (d. 1666)
- February 26 – Matsudaira Norinaga, Japanese daimyō (d. 1654)
- March 3
  - George Ghica, Prince of Wallachia (d. 1664)
  - Robert Roberthin, German poet (d. 1648)
- March 19 – Anders Bille, Danish general (d. 1657)
- March 26 – Matthew Marvin, Sr., Connecticut settler (d. 1678)

=== April–June ===
- April 11 – Jacques Buteux, French missionary (d. 1652)
- April 13 – Duke Johann Wilhelm of Saxe-Altenburg, colonel in the Saxon Army (d. 1632)
- April 22 – Alessandro dal Borro, Austrian field marshal (d. 1656)
- May 25 – Thomas Hamilton, 2nd Earl of Haddington, Scottish noble (d. 1640)
- May 31 – Empress Xiaoduanwen of the Qing Dynasty (d. 1649)
- June 26
  - Sir Richard Grenville, 1st Baronet, English Royalist leader (baptised; d. 1658)
  - Juan de Palafox y Mendoza, Spanish politician, clergyman (d. 1659)
- June 29 – Maria Maddalena de' Medici, Italian princess (d. 1633)

=== July–September ===
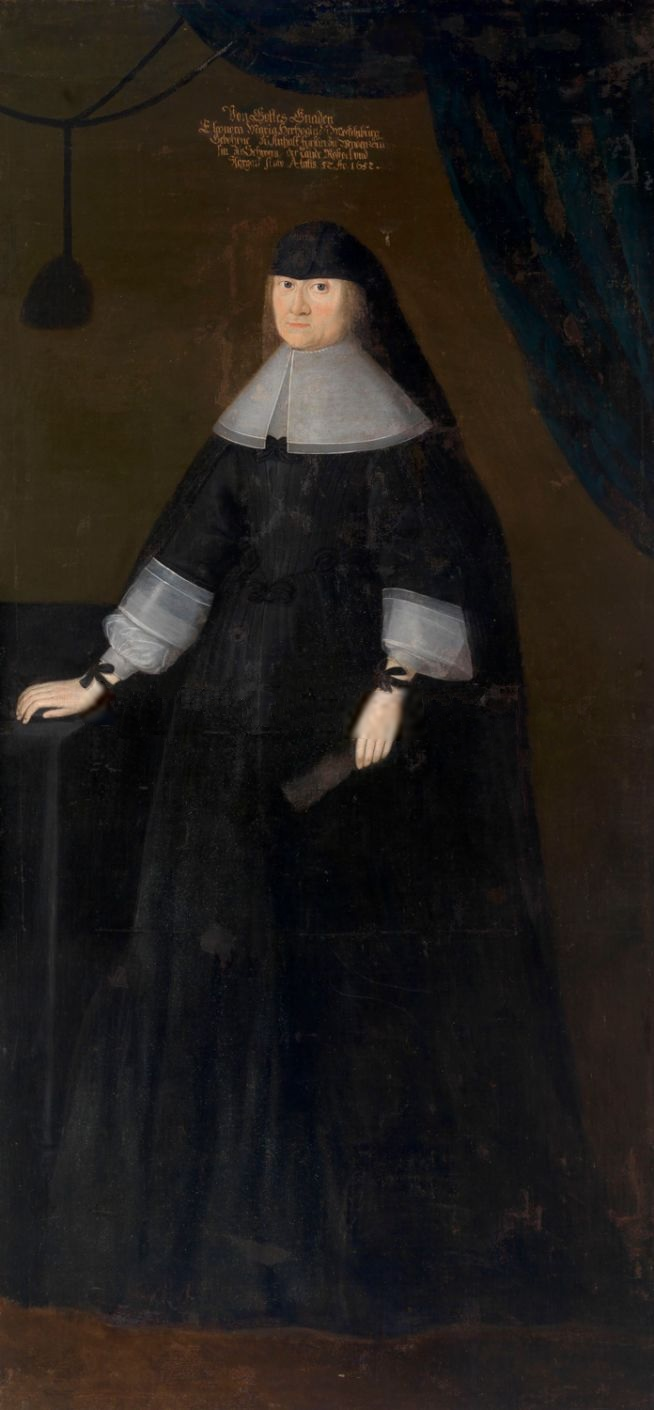
Eleonore Marie of Anhalt-Bernburg

- July 1 – George Gobat, French theologian (d. 1679)
- July 15 – Jan Cossiers, Flemish painter (d. 1671)
- July 20 – Sir Edward Acton, 1st Baronet, Sheriff of Shropshire (d. 1659)
- July 22
  - Sir Hugh Cholmeley, 1st Baronet, English politician (d. 1657)
  - Michel de Marolles, French translator and churchman (d. 1681)
- August 7 – Eleonore Marie of Anhalt-Bernburg, Duchess consort of Mecklenburg-Güstrow (d. 1657)
- August 16 – Maria Celeste, Italian nun, daughter of Galileo Galilei (d. 1634)
- August 24 – Antoine de Laloubère, French Jesuit mathematician (d. 1664)
- August 29 – John Stawell, English Member of Parliament and governor of Taunton (d. 1662)
- September 5 – Loreto Vittori, Italian singer and composer (d. 1670)
- September 19
  - Hermann Busenbaum, German Jesuit theologian (d. 1668)
  - John Frederick, Duke of Saxe-Weimar (d. 1628)
- September 29 – Sir Thomas Aston, 1st Baronet, English politician (d. 1645)
- September 30 – Francis Bacon, English politician and Ipswich MP (d. 1663)

=== October–December ===
- October 1 – Dirk Graswinckel, Dutch jurist (d. 1666)
- October 2 – Petronio Veroni, Roman Catholic prelate, Bishop of Boiano (1652–1653) (d. 1653)
- October 4 – Giovanni Paolo Oliva, Italian Jesuit (d. 1681)
- November – John Ogilby, English writer and cartographer (d. 1676)
- November 15 – Aniello Falcone, Italian Baroque painter (d. 1665)
- November 19
  - Lieuwe van Aitzema, Dutch historian and statesman (d. 1669)
  - Charles I, King of England, Scotland and Ireland (d. 1649)
- December 12 – Denis of the Nativity, French sailor and cartographer (d. 1638)
- December 14 – Anna Magdalene of Hanau, German countess (d. 1673)
- December 15 – Selius Marselis, Dutch/Norwegian tradesman (d. 1663)
- December 20 – Nicolas Sanson, French cartographer (d. 1667)
- December – Marie de Rohan, French courtier and political activist (d. 1679)

=== Date unknown ===
- Marin le Roy de Gomberville, French poet and novelist (d. 1674)
- Anna Alojza Ostrogska, Polish noblewoman (d. 1654)
- William Prynne, English Puritan politician (d. 1669)
- Brian Walton, English bishop and scholar (d. 1661)

=== Probable ===
- Martine Bertereau, French mineralogist
- Jonas Bronck, Swedish colonist in America (d. 1643)
- Dud Dudley, first Englishman to smelt iron ore with coke (d. 1684)
- Piaras Feiritéar, Irish language poet (d. 1653)
- Samuel Hartlib, British scholar (d. 1662)
- Claude Lorrain, French Baroque painter, draughtsman and engraver (d. 1682)
- Samuel Rutherford, Scottish theologian and controversialist (d. 1660)

== Deaths ==
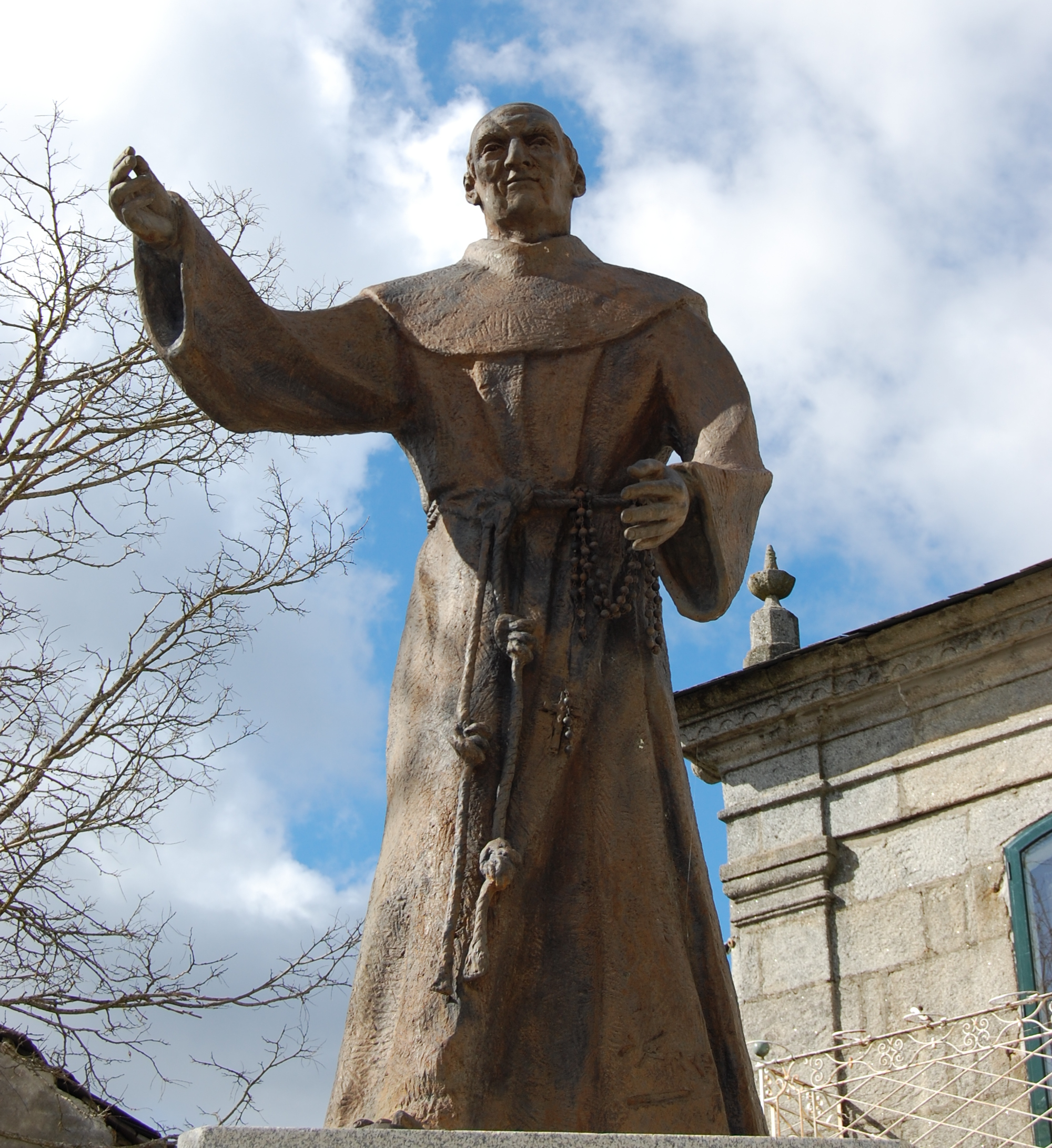
Sebastian de Aparicio

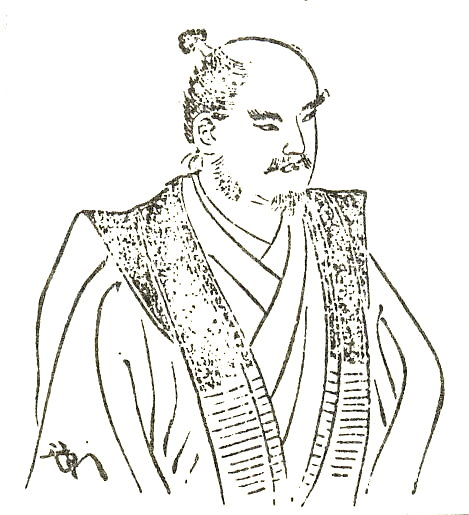
Shima Sakon

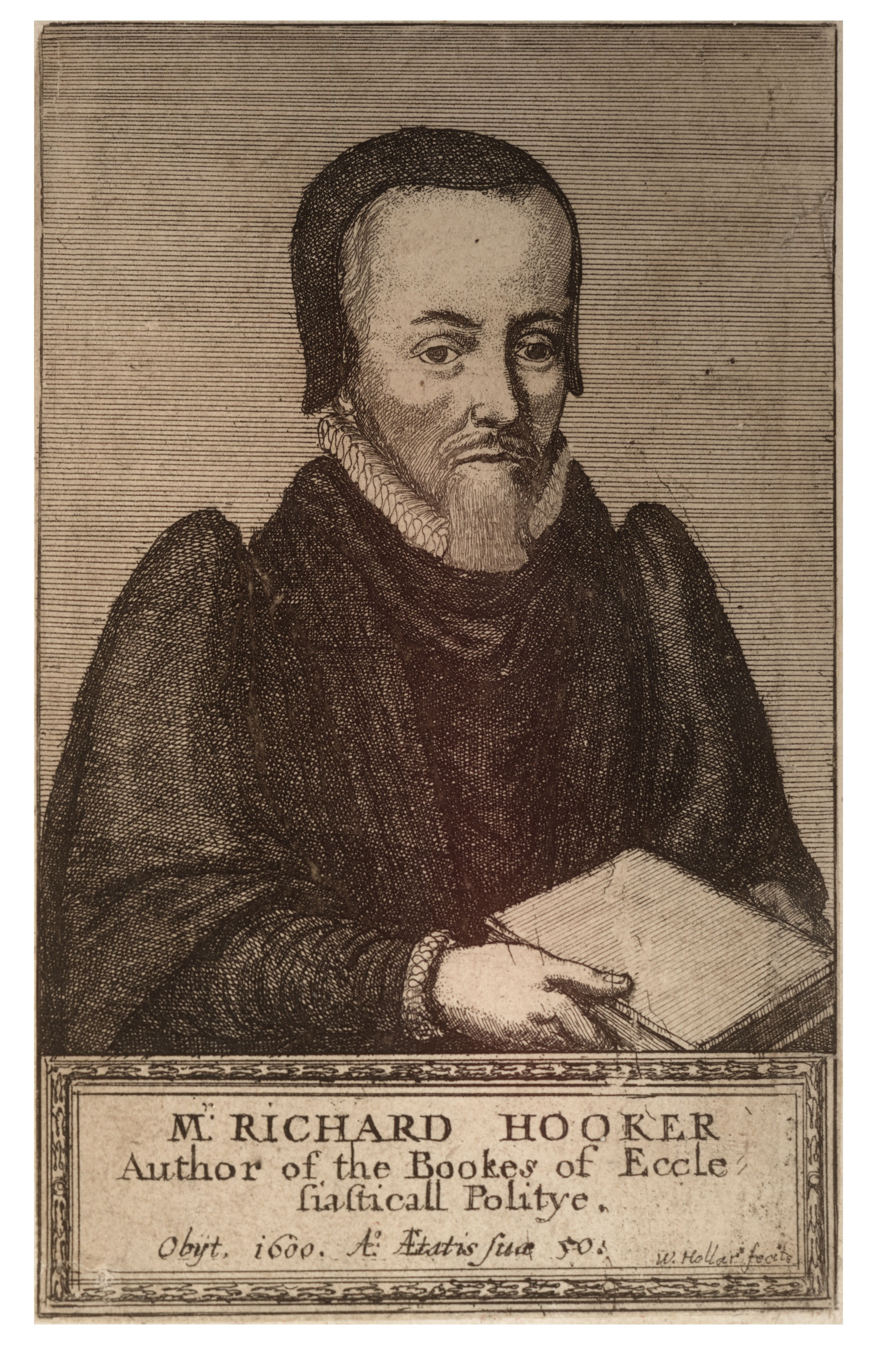
Richard Hooker

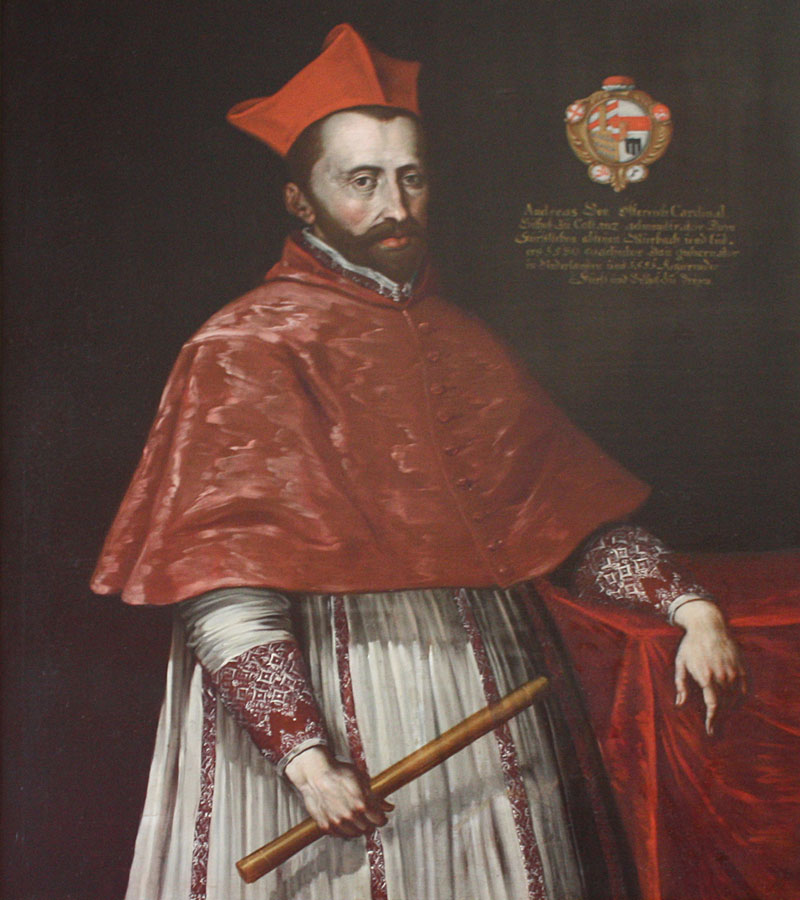
Margrave Andrew of Burgau

=== January–March ===
- January 9 – John Spencer, English landowner and politician (b. 1549)
- January 21 – Jerzy Radziwiłł, Polish–Lithuanian nobleman (szlachcic) from the Radziwiłł family (b. 1556)
- February 9 – John Frederick, Duke of Pomerania, Protestant Bishop of Cammin (1567–1574) and ruling Duke of Pomerania (1569–1600) (b. 1542)
- February 15 – José de Acosta, Spanish Jesuit missionary and naturalist (b. 1540)
- February 17 – Giordano Bruno, Italian philosopher (burned at the stake) (b. 1548)
- February 25 – Sebastian de Aparicio, Spanish colonial industrialist, Roman Catholic priest and blessed in Mexico (b. 1502)
- February 29 – Caspar Hennenberger, German historian and cartographe (b. 1529)
- March 6 – Johann Major, German poet and theologian (b. 1533)
- March 20 – Gustaf Banér, Swedish noble (b. 1547)
- April 1 – Esperanza Malchi, Ottoman businessperson
- April – Thomas Deloney, English writer (b. 1543)

=== April–June ===
- May 17 – Thomas Leighton, English politician (b. 1554)
- May 18
  - Nicolaus Olai Bothniensis, Swedish archbishop (b. 1550)
  - Fulvio Orsini, Italian humanist, historian and archaeologist (b. 1529)
- May 19 – Abe Masakatsu, Japanese nobleman (b. 1541)
- June 3 – Juan Grande Román, Spanish Catholic saint (b. 1546)
- June 8 – Edward Fortunatus, German nobleman (b. 1565)
- June 25 – David Chytraeus, German historian and theologian (b. 1530)
- June 19 – Christopher Layer, English politician (b. 1531)

=== July–September ===
- July 5 – Jean Kincaid, Scottish murderer (b. 1579)
- July 7 – Thomas Lucy, English politician (b. 1532)
- July 20 – William More, English courtier (b. 1520)
- July 27 – John Glanville, English politician (b. 1542)
- August 5
  - Alexander Ruthven, Scottish earl (b. 1580)
  - John Ruthven, 3rd Earl of Gowrie, Scottish conspirator (b. 1577)
  - Queen Uiin, Korean royal consort (b. 1555)
- August 18 – Sebastiano Montelupi, Italian businessman (b. 1516)
- August 22 – Nicasius de Sille, Dutch diplomat (b. 1543)
- August 25 – Hosokawa Gracia, Japanese noblewoman (b. 1563)
- August 27 – Mizuno Tadashige, Japanese nobleman (b. 1541)
- September 1 – Tadeáš Hájek, Czech medical doctor and astronomer (b. 1525)
- September 25 – Antoine du Verdier, French politician (b. 1544)
- September 26 – Claude Le Jeune, French composer (b. 1530)

=== October–December ===
- October 12 – Luis de Molina, Spanish Jesuit priest and philosopher (b. 1535)
- October 16 – Nicolaus Reimers, German astronomer (b. 1551)
- October 17 – Cornelis de Jode, Flemish cartographer, engraver and publisher (b. 1568)
- October 21
  - Toda Katsushige, Japanese warlord (b. 1557)
  - Shima Sakon, Japanese samurai (b. 1540)
  - Shimazu Toyohisa, Japanese samurai (b. 1570)
  - Ōtani Yoshitsugu, Japanese samurai (b. 1558)
- November 3 – Richard Hooker, English Anglican theologian (b. 1554)
- November 6
  - Ishida Mitsunari, Japanese feudal lord (decapitated) (b. 1560)
  - Konishi Yukinaga, Japanese Christian warlord (b. 1555)
- November 8 – Natsuka Masaie, Japanese warlord (b. 1562)
- November 12 – Margrave Andrew of Burgau, German nobleman, Cardinal, Bishop of Constance and Brixen (b. 1558)
- November 15 – Sigmund Fugger von Kirchberg und Weißenhorn, bishop of Regensburg (b. 1542)
- November 17 – Kuki Yoshitaka, Japanese naval commander (b. 1542)
- November 25 – Juan Téllez-Girón, 2nd Duke of Osuna, Spanish duke (b. 1559)
- November 30 – Nanda Bayin, King of Burma (b. 1535)
- December 3 – Roger North, 2nd Baron North, English politician (b. 1530)
- December 16 – Charles I, Count Palatine of Zweibrücken-Birkenfeld (1569–1600) (b. 1560)

=== Full date missing ===
- Gilles de Noailles – French Ambassador to the Ottoman Empire from 1575 to 1579 (b. 1524)
