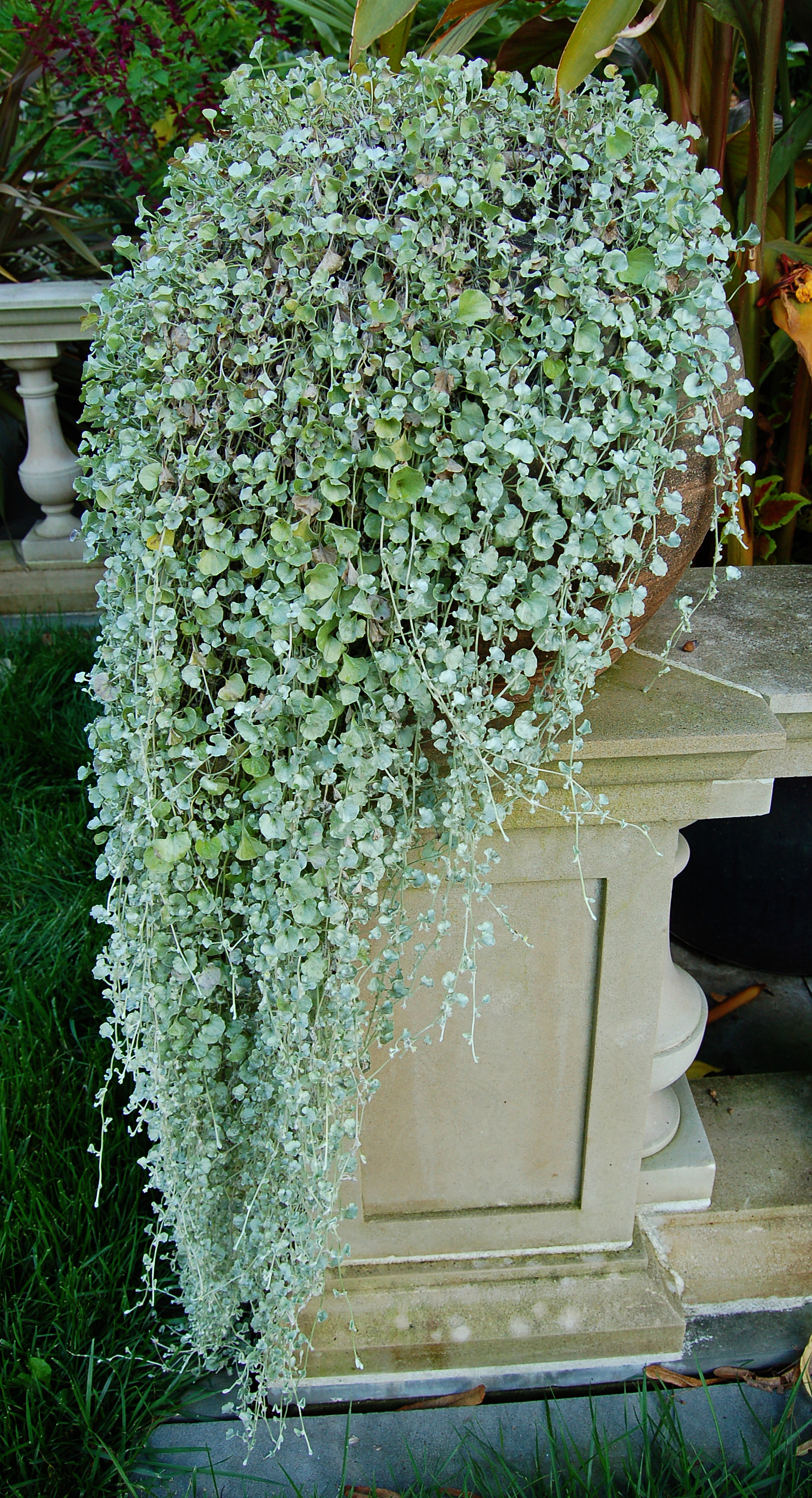
- Dichondra argentea 'Silver Falls' cultivar at Chanticleer Garden, Pennsylvania

Scientific classification
- Kingdom: Plantae
- Clade: Tracheophytes
- Clade: Angiosperms
- Clade: Eudicots
- Clade: Asterids
- Order: Solanales
- Family: Convolvulaceae
- Genus: Dichondra
- Species: D. argentea

Binomial name
- Dichondra argentea Willd.

Synonyms
- Dichondra evolvulacea var. argentea (Willd.) Kuntze

= Dichondra argentea =

Species of plant in the bindweed family

Dichondra argentea, the silver ponysfoot or silver nickel vine, is a species of flowering plant in the family Convolvulaceae.

== Description ==
It is a xerophytic, creeping, climbing, fast-growing plant reaching 4 in (10 cm) high but growing 4 to 6 ft (1 to 2 m) long. Its stems are short, very branched. The dark green leaves are simple, entire, alternate, kidney-shaped or ear-shaped. They are 1–2 × 2 cm; cleft apex.

The whitish flowers are isolated, on recurved pedicels. They are barely visible and have a diameter of 5 mm. The fruit is a globose, cleft capsule, 5 mm in diameter, hairy. Dark brown to black seeds, 2 mm long, with short, white hairs.

== Cultivation ==
It is hardy in USDA zones 10 through 12. In cultivation it is grown as annual, chiefly as a hanging accent plant or ground cover. There is a cultivar, 'Silver Falls'.

== Distribution ==
It is disjunctly distributed in New Mexico, Texas, Mexico, Colombia, Bolivia, northwest Argentina, and southeast Brazil, and has gone extinct in Arizona.

== Uses ==
This plant is popularly known as a remedy for bile in the north of the Mexican Republic, in the states of Aguascalientes and Durango. It is also ingested as an appetizer, laxative and anti-abortive, in this case, due to its property of relaxing the uterine muscle. It is also used to avoid having children. It is also used against heart problems, ant bites, bitterness in the mouth, headaches, to regulate fever and relieve toothache, tonsillitis and pain due to anger.

At the beginning of the 18th century, Juan de Esteyneffer used it in a decoction against protruding tripe. In the 20th century, Maximino Martínez mentions it as an anti-inflammatory; against bilious diseases, and points out that it causes idiocy.
