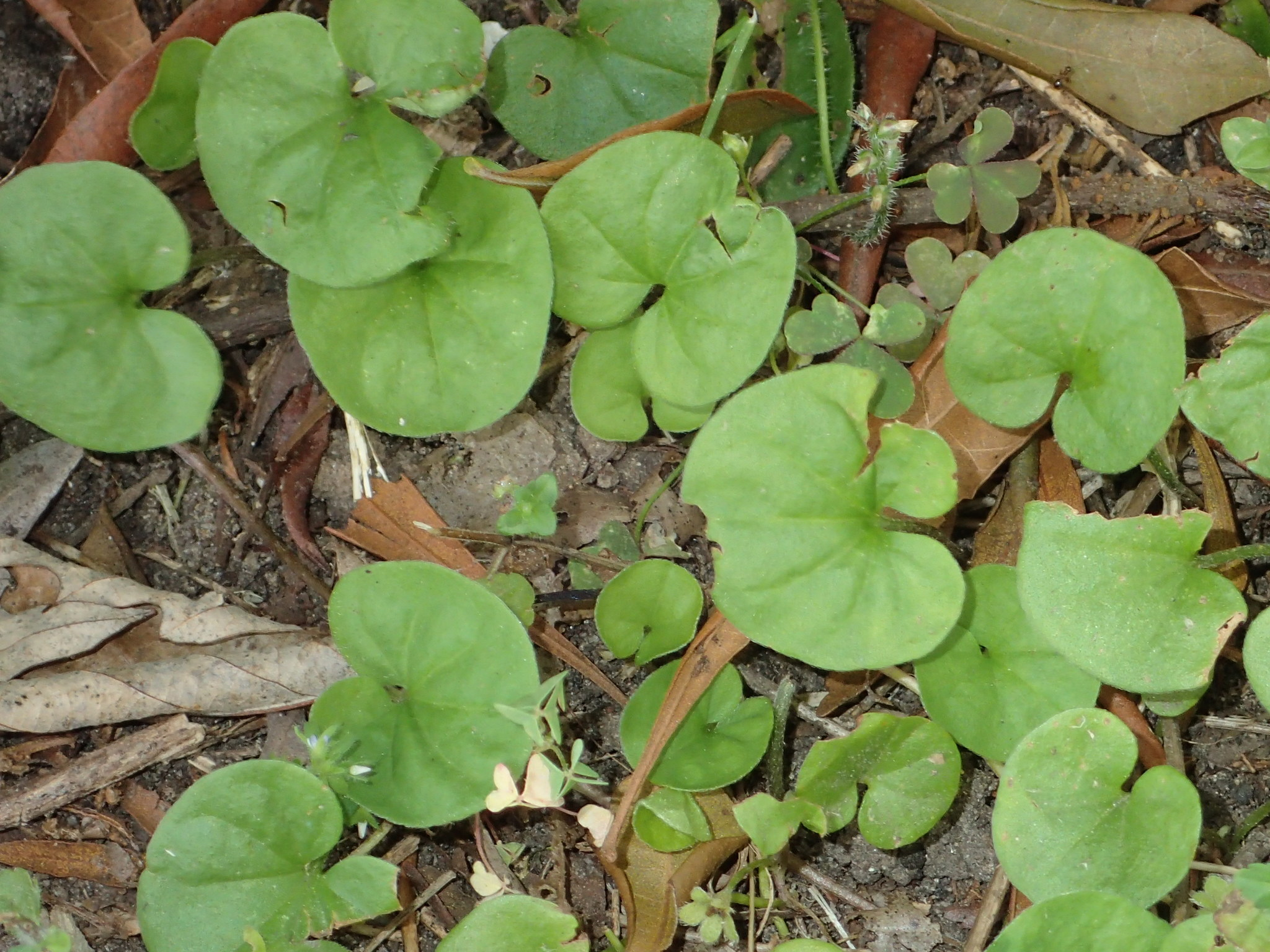

Scientific classification
- Kingdom: Plantae
- Clade: Tracheophytes
- Clade: Angiosperms
- Clade: Eudicots
- Clade: Asterids
- Order: Solanales
- Family: Convolvulaceae
- Genus: Dichondra
- Species: D. carolinensis

Binomial name
- Dichondra carolinensis Michx., 1803

Synonyms
- Demidofia repens J.F.Gmel.; Dichondra caroliniana Willd. ex DC.; Dichondra evolvulacea var. carolinensis (Michx.) Kuntze

= Dichondra carolinensis =

Species of flowering plant

Dichondra carolinensis, commonly known as Carolina ponysfoot, is a small herbaceous plant native to Bermuda and the south-eastern United States.

== Description ==
D. carolinensis is a spreading perennial. Its leaves are 1 to 3 centimeters in width, with petioles ranging in length from 1 to 4 centimeters.

== Distribution and habitat ==
This species' native range stretches from Virginia to Florida and westward to Arkansas and Texas. It can be found in Bermuda and has also been reported in the Bahamas.

D. carolinensis occurs in several types of communities, such as within pine-oak savannas and woods. It has displayed preference for high levels of light and dry loamy soil.
