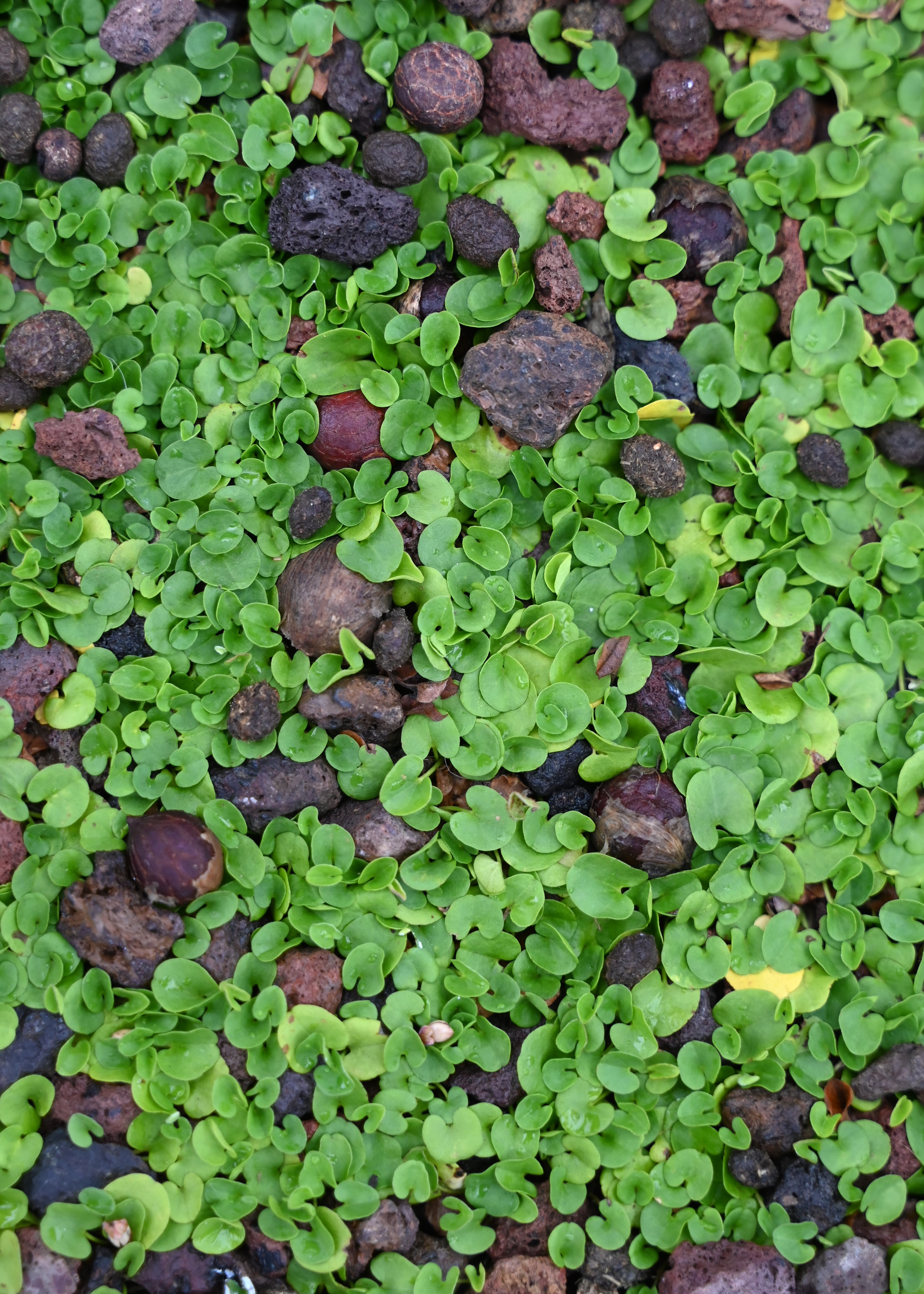
- Growing as a weed at the Jardín Botánico Canario Viera y Clavijo
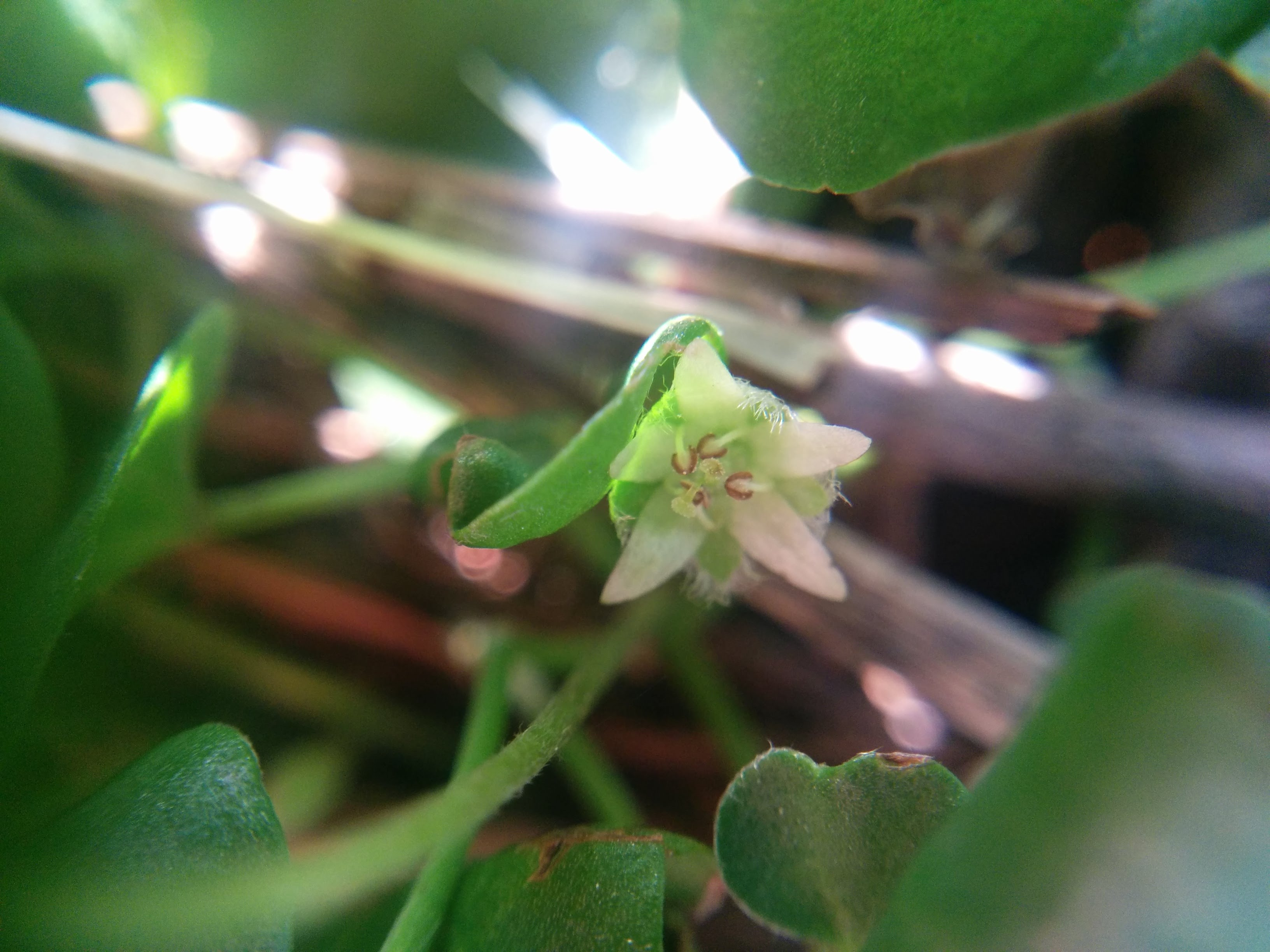
- Flower at Central China Normal University

Conservation status
- Least Concern (IUCN 3.1)

Scientific classification
- Kingdom: Plantae
- Clade: Tracheophytes
- Clade: Angiosperms
- Clade: Eudicots
- Clade: Asterids
- Order: Solanales
- Family: Convolvulaceae
- Genus: Dichondra
- Species: D. micrantha

Binomial name
- Dichondra micrantha Urb.

Synonyms
- Dichondra repens Anon.; Dichondra repens var. micrantha (Urb.) Lu

= Dichondra micrantha =

Species of plant

Dichondra micrantha, the Asian ponysfoot or lawnleaf, is a species of flowering plant in the family Convolvulaceae. It is native to Texas, Mexico, and the Caribbean, and it has been introduced worldwide. A prostrate perennial reaching 10 cm (4 in), it prefers wetter soils. In the past it was recommended as a grass substitute in lawns due to its easy maintenance requirements, but proved vulnerable to flea beetles.
