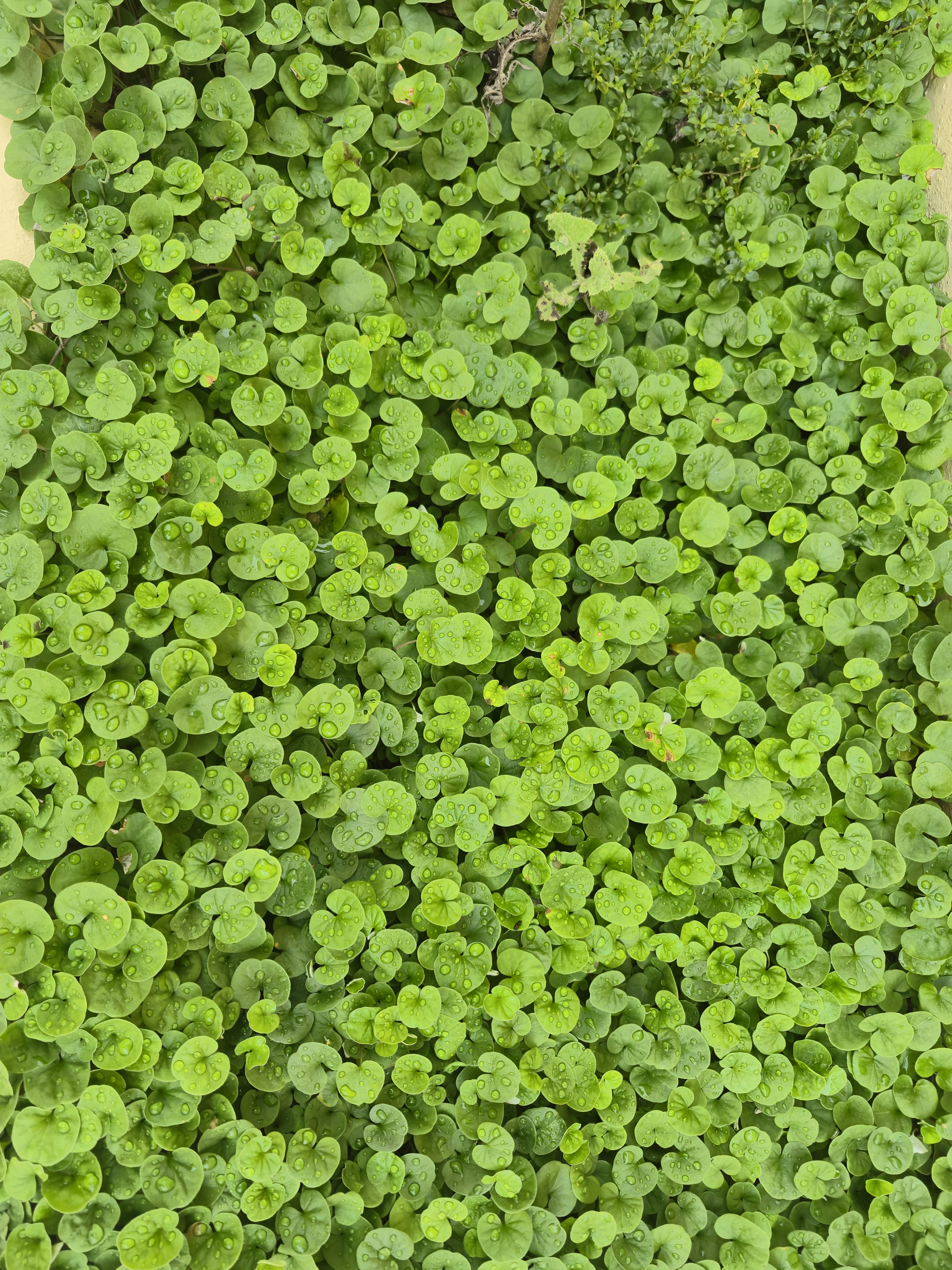
- Dichondra sp.

Scientific classification
- Kingdom: Plantae
- Clade: Tracheophytes
- Clade: Angiosperms
- Clade: Eudicots
- Clade: Asterids
- Order: Solanales
- Family: Convolvulaceae
- Tribe: Dichondreae
- Genus: Dichondra; J.R.Forst. & G.Forst.

Species
- See text

Synonyms
- Dichondropsis Brandegee

= Dichondra =

Genus of flowering plants

Dichondra is a small genus of flowering plants in the morning glory family, Convolvulaceae. They are prostrate, perennial, herbaceous plants, with creeping stems which take root readily at the leaf nodes. The flowers are white, greenish or yellowish, 2–3 mm (0.079–0.118 in) diameter. Members of the genus are commonly known as ponysfoots and are native to tropical and cool temperate regions around the world.

== Taxonomy ==
=== Etymology ===
The genus name is derived from the Greek words δίς (dis), meaning "two", and χόνδρος (chondros), meaning "grain". It refers to the fruits.

=== Species ===
The number of species is disputed, with some authorities accepting only two species. The following species are recognised in the genus Dichondra by the International Plant Names Index (IPNI):

- Dichondra argentea Humb. & Bonpl. ex Willd. – silver dichondra — Mexico, Texas.
- Dichondra brachypoda Wooton & Standl. – New Mexico ponysfoot
- Dichondra brevifolia Buchanan
- Dichondra carolinensis Michx. – Carolina ponysfoot
- Dichondra donelliana Tharp & M.C.Johnst. – California ponysfoot
- Dichondra evolvulacea (L.f.) Britton
- Dichondra macrocalyx Meisn.
- Dichondra micrantha Urb. – Asian ponysfoot
- Dichondra microcalyx Meisn. – "Oreja de ratón — South America
- Dichondra nivea (Brandegee) Tharp & M.C.Johnst.
- Dichondra occidentalis House – western dichondra — Southern California coast.
- Dichondra parvifolia Meisn.
- Dichondra recurvata Tharp & M.C.Johnst. – oakwoods ponysfoot
- Dichondra repens J.R.Forst. & G.Forst. — kidney weed
- Dichondra sericea Sw. – silverleaf ponysfoot

== Cultivation and uses ==
Some Dichondra species are cultivated as ornamental plants, with cultivar selections also available. Dichondra micrantha is used as a groundcover. Dichondra argentea is a light silver leaved accent plant. The Dichondra argentea 'Silver Falls' cultivar is often used for trailing over the rims of potted plants, and has lower water needs.

Dichondra micrantha was very popular in Southern California in the 1950s and 1960s as a grass substitute for lawns. Each leaf consists of a stem with a nearly circular or kidney-shaped horizontal leaf top, between 8–25 mm (0.31–0.98 in) in diameter with a 20–35 mm (0.79–1.38 in) petiole.

In some habitats and landscapes of the United States, some of the non-native Dichondra species are treated as weeds.
