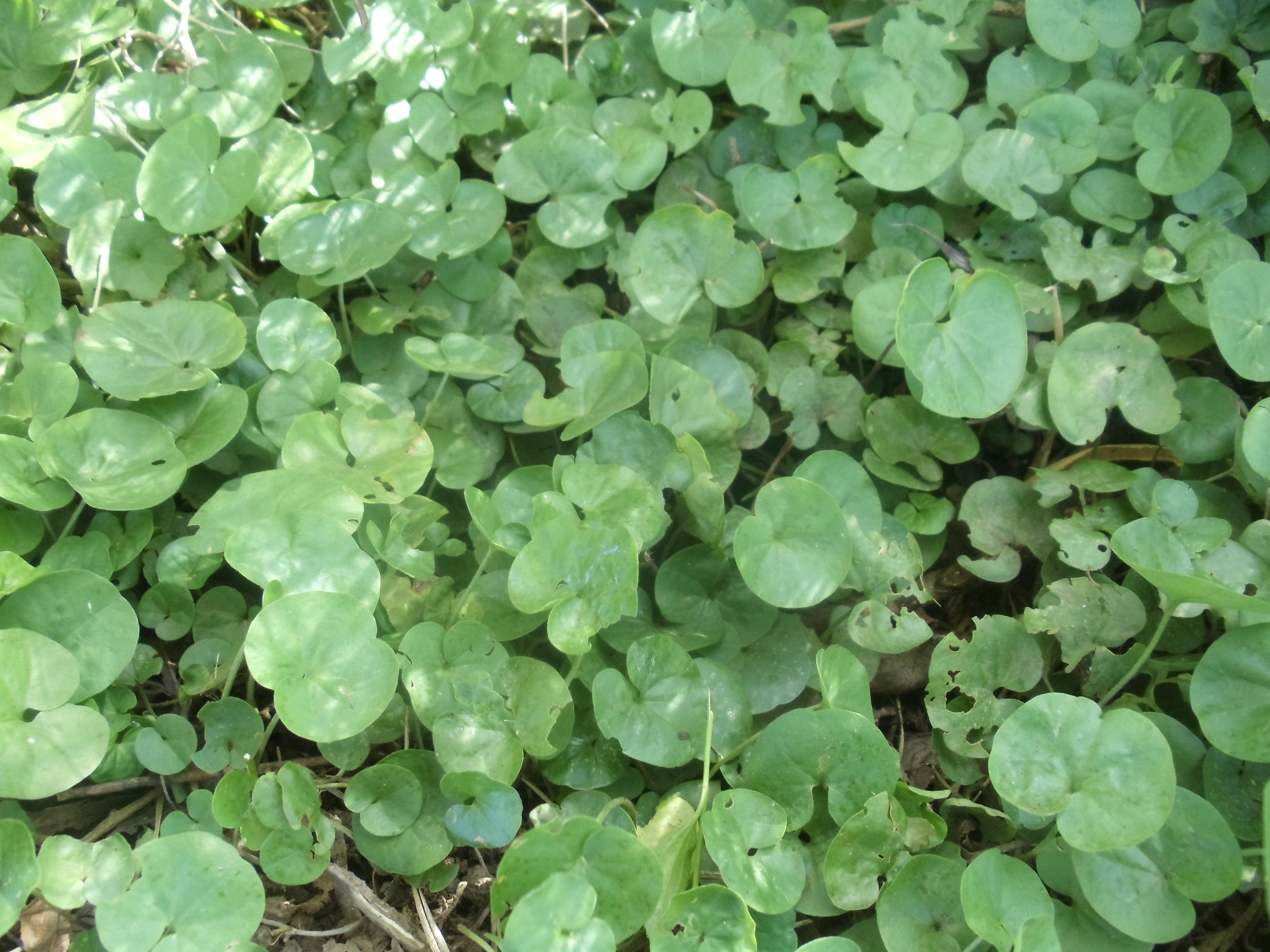
- Dichondra microcalyx

Scientific classification
- Kingdom: Plantae
- Clade: Tracheophytes
- Clade: Angiosperms
- Clade: Eudicots
- Clade: Asterids
- Order: Solanales
- Family: Convolvulaceae
- Genus: Dichondra
- Species: D. microcalyx

Binomial name
- Dichondra microcalyx (Hallier f.) Fabris

Synonyms
- Dichondra repens var. microcalyx Hallier f.; Dichondra sericea var. microcalyx (Hallier f.) H.T.Buck; Dichondra repens var. longipetiolata Mattos

= Dichondra microcalyx =

Species of plant in the bindweed family

Dichondra microcalyx, the mouse ear (Spanish: oreja de ratón), is a species of plant in the family Convolvulaceae.
