= Catherine Jérémie =

Early naturalist and midwife in New France

- Born: Catherine-Gertrude Jérémie; 22 September 1664; Quebec City, New France
- Died: 1 July 1744 (aged 79); Montreal, New France
- Known for: One of the earliest botanists in Canada; first known female naturalist in New France; applying Indigenous medicinal knowledge to women's health
- Scientific career
- Fields: Midwifery, botany, herbalism

Catherine Jérémie (1664–1744) was a French-Canadian midwife and botanist in New France.

== Early life and family ==
Catherine Jérémie was baptized in Champlain, Quebec, on September 22, 1664, to Jeanne Pelletier and trader Noël Jérémie. She was the eldest of 11 siblings; She was proceeded by Marie-Charlotte (baptized April 26, 1667), Nicolas (baptized February 1669), Francois (baptized 1671), Marie-Madeleine (born 1674), Louis (born 1676), Ignace (born October 29, 1684), Marie-Jeanne (baptized July 28, 1678), Charlotte-Judith (baptized November 23, 1705), and finally Joseph (baptized August 6, 1687).

Jérémie married Jacques Aubuchon in Champlain, Quebec, on January 28, 1681, and together they had one daughter. On November 3, 1688, Jérémie married Michel LePailleur in Batiscan, Quebec. Jérémie and LePailleur together had 10 or 11 children.

Jérémie died July 1, 1744, in Montreal, Quebec.

== Scientific career ==
In 1702 Jérémie settled in Montreal with husband Michel LePailleur where she pursued her studies and research in botany and midwifery. She was particularly interested in the medicinal practices of the Indigenous populations of Canada. She studied these medicinal plant uses and further discovered many remedies. She applied these findings to her knowledge of women's health.

Jérémie was one of the earliest botanists in Canada and the first female naturalist known to date. She was known in the French scientific world for providing French naturalists with detailed reports of the plants they collected, and she sent her collections to the Jardin des Plantes in Paris, encouraged by the French Académie des Sciences in order to collect Canada's flora and fauna. Colony intendant Gilles Hocquart noted her practices as significant in his reports to France and these collections are now preserved at the Muséum National d'Histoire Naturelle in Paris. Overall, Jérémie made a large contribution to natural science in New France.

Jérémie's knowledge of herbal remedies increased her reputation and practice as a midwife, as she was able to apply these uses specifically to women's healthcare, such as abortion, pregnancy and birth. In the seventeenth and eighteenth centuries, most midwives engaged in a private practice, were less costly than doctors, and stayed at their client's homes for longer periods of time while helping with household chores. Jérémie used the interventionist approach to healthcare, which contradicted the laissez-faire approach of many English scholars. She soon became known as a famed midwife and was referred to as "la magicienne de ma vie au Quebec" (the magician of my life in Quebec) by one of her clients.

== See also ==
- Timeline of women in science
