= Maria Gobat =

Swiss Missionary

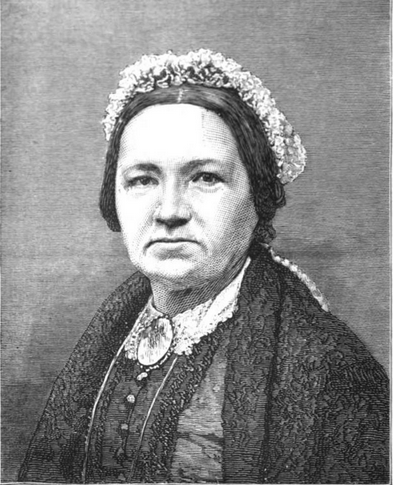
Maria Gobat

Maria Gobat (9 November 1813 – 1 August 1879) was a Swiss missionary "known for her gracious hospitality". For 45 years, as the wife of Samuel Gobat, she rendered invaluable service, such as instructing girls, during her husband's missionary career in Abyssinia, Malta, and finally in the bishopric of Jerusalem.

== Early life and education ==
Maria Regina Christina Zeller was born on 9 November 1813 at Zofingen, in the Canton of Aargau, in Switzerland. She was one of a large family, being the second of eleven children. Her father, Christian Heinrieh Zeller, was a prominent pastor and educator of an old Württemberg family. He had gone to Switzerland to settle, and was at that time director of the schools in Zofingen. Madame Zeller was the daughter of a Swiss clergyman. The Zeller family was important in regards to two major pietist centers during the 19th century: Schloss Beuggen, a teachers' training college, and Mannedorf in the Canton of Zürich.

In the year 1819, Mr. Zeller received the call to begin a home for destitute children, in Beuggen near Bâle; and he soon joined to it the institution for training poor schoolmasters. His great love for, and devotion to, the work, caused it to increase from year to year. Goab was six years old when the family removed to Beuggen where she spent her youth. Her father treated his children with love, combined with great firmness and strictness. Under the influence and guidance of Madame Zeller, Gobat and her sisters grew up learning to put a helping hand everywhere, and to assist cheerfully in bearing the burdens of others.

She received a part of her education away from home, returning after a few years to help her mother with household duties. She had a deeply religious nature, and was described as having an unselfish, happy, contented disposition. Her simple faith remained unchanged all her life.

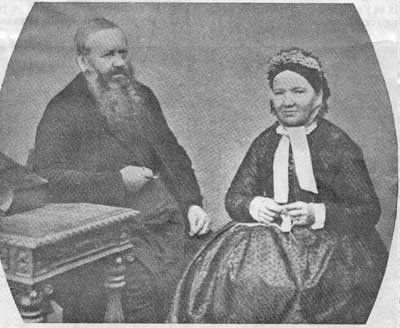
Samuel and Maria Gobat

Toward the end of 1833, the well-known Abyssinian missionary, Samuel Gobat went to Beuggen, and became acquainted with the family of the Zellers. Mr. Gobat had been engaged in missionary work and missionary studies for and with the Abyssinians, under the auspices of the Church Mission Society, from 1826. In 1833, Mr. Gobat visited Europe in order to make known the preparedness of the land of Abyssinia for mission-work, and to induce other labourers to accompany him back to the work. Upon visiting the Zellers -Christian having been Mr. Gobat's friend in early student days- he became acquainted with Christian's daughter Maria, and soon discovered that she possessed all the necessary qualifications for becoming a good wife and a good missionary. He left the negotiations to his brother missionary, Count Zaremba. The couple were betrothed during the last days of December 1833 and married on 23 May 1834.

== Career ==
=== Abyssinia ===
Soon after the wedding, the couple paid a farewell visit to Mr. Gobat's home at Crémines, in the Canton of Bern, and then started on their difficult journey to Abyssinia. They left Marseille on July 14, and took with them the young woman who was engaged to Karl Wilhelm Isenberg, and the marriage of the latter took place when they reach Alexandria. The two couples proceeded to Cairo after a week at Alexandria, and there had to wait three months till books, which were to be distributed in Abyssinia, had arrived from Europe. they employed the time in study, and Mrs. Gobat was able to help her husband, who had weak eyes, by reading aloud to him. They were able to reach Suez in October, and then went to Jeddah in a boat full of pilgrims. On arriving at Jeddah, the two women adopted the Arab attire, and veiled themselves to their eyes.

The young missionaries had a rough time in travelling: on the Red Sea, they sailed in Arab dhows; they crossed mountains on foot; and while going through the desert, they rode on camels or mules. They could only take the most necessary things with them, and had many hardships to endure. Mrs. Gobat occupied her spare time in learning Amharic, and with her husband as teacher, she made rapid progress.

Soon after reaching Massowah, Mr. Gobat fell very ill, but resolved, if possible, to push on to Abyssinia, in order to introduce his young brother-missionary to the work. This brother was the Rev. Isenberg, who had been appointed to the mission in consequence of Mr. Gobat's representations. However, it was with great difficulty that they reached Adowa, ten weeks later, on 11 May 1835. Here they were forced to settle down for a time, for Mr. Gobat was so ill that he was confined for two years to his bed. The love and kindness of the natives, who, from Mr. Gobat's former residences in Abyssinia, held him in the highest esteem, did much to make their stay at Adowa bearable. They never spoke of the country and its people but with enthusiasm; and in after years, when some of the Abyssinians visited them in Jerusalem, the missionary bishop and his wife were happy to see them again.

When their first baby, Sofie, was born in Adowa on 2 August 1835, Mr. Gobat seemed almost dying. There was no possibility of getting any suitable food, and they had but few medicines. Kind friends among the native population did much to make the remainder of their stay bearable. Mrs. Gobat herself two bouts of cholera in 1836. Mr. Gobat's health continued to be precarious. When a doctor who happened to be traveling in the country pronounced his case hopeless if he did not immediately return to Europe, they bade farewell to Isenberg and his wife, and began the journey back home on 1 September 1836.

=== Return to Switzerland ===
They reached Halai, and then descended the mount of Shumfeito before arriving at Massowah with great difficulty. They stayed at Jidda three days, and reached Cosseir 28 days later. Their journey took them up the Red Sea. Their boat was so small -the only cabin measured 8 by 4 feet (2.4 m × 1.2 m)- that they could not stand upright in it, and had scarcely room on deck to walk. The Arabs had laid in provisions for three weeks only, but they were 38 days en route, with no food except for rice cooked in half-putrid water. The goat died which Mr.. Gobat had taken on board to provide milk for their infant daughter, Sofie, and she became seriously ill with Ophthalmia, which developed into inflammation of the brain. From Cosseir, they began the journey through the desert. They had to travel many days in the scorching sun, without a good hat or an umbrella, with very coarse food and with scarcely any water. Fortunately, Mr. Gobat was better, but Mrs. Gobat was completely worn out. Sophie moaned and cried night and day. From Kena, in order to reach Cairo, they had to travel eight days by boat on the Nile; Sofie died on the last day. Sofie was buried in the Coptic burial ground in Cairo. In Cairo, they quartered at the home of Rev. Theodor Muller. On 31 December 1836 a son was born who, in remembrance of their past trials, they named Benoni.

On 13 February 1837 they left Cairo and travelled by boat to Alexandria and then to Malta, arriving at Mr.. Gobat's home in Cremine on 11 May. After a few days in Cremine, they visited Mrs. Gobat's parents in Beuggen. They spent three months recuperating at Bad Kreuznach, from June to September, before returning to Basle by way of Frankfurt and Württemberg. During the winter of 1837-38, the family stayed in Beuggen, while the summer of 1838 was spent in London, where Mrs. Gobat fell ill and remained so for a long time. Their third child, Hannah, was born at Beuggen during the winter of 1838-39. There was another trip to Kreuznach in 1839.

=== Malta ===
In the autumn of 1839, Mr. Gobat and his wife went to Malta, he being sent there by the Church Missionary Society to superintend the translation of the Bible into Arabic, and to take charge of the printing press of the Church Missionary Society. In the summer of 1840, Mrs. Gobat became ill for a prolonged period, In that same year, their fourth child and second son was born, but he only survived 13 months. They remained in this island for about three years, when they returned to Switzerland again, where Mr. Gobat worked for the Missionary Society in various ways, and did missionary work amongst the Druses of Mount Lebanon. Their fifth child and third daughter, Dora, was born in 1842.

In May 1843, the family returned to Switzerland. They visited to Albisbrunn, in the canton of Zurich, for a health treatment, and then to Bern. They spent two years at the foot of the Weissenstein. In September 1844, their sixth child, Maria, was born. That year, Mr. Gobat was invited to accept the office of Vice-Principal of a Protestant college in Malta, and that he must be episcopally ordained in order to do so.

In 1845, Mr. Gobat studied and was ordained a Deacon, and in October of that year, the family arrived in Malta. By January 1846, Mrs. Gobat had purchased all the necessary furniture and everything else necessary for the opening of the Malta Protestant College, which took place in February. In March 1846, he was nominated by Frederick William IV of Prussia to the see of Jerusalem. He was ordained a priest at a general ordination at Fulham. A few days later, on 5 July 1846, he was consecrated Bishop of the Church of England, at Lambeth by William Howley, Archbishop of Canterbury, assisted by the Bishops of London, Lichfield, and Kolkata. Their seventh child, James Timothy, was born in Malta, in 1846. In the meantime, Mrs. Gobat made the necessary purchases and preparations for their establishment at Jerusalem.

=== Jerusalem ===
Mrs. Gobat took care of the large family and her many duties as her husband's helpmeet, taking keen interest in all the schools and missions. These schools were all established by Bishop Gobat, and so successfully carried on that a year before his death, there were fourteen hundred children under instruction in them. She specially loved the Diocesan School and Orphanage on Mount Zion. It was supported by voluntary contributions, the bishop and Mrs. Gobat making up all deficiencies out of their private funds. This orphanage, as well as the other mission schools, prospered and increased under the care of Bishop and Mrs. Gobat during their thirty-three years of labour there. The institution was later carried on under the superintendence of the Rev. John Zeller, son-in-law of the Rev. and Mrs. Gobat.

== Later life ==
The Bishop and Mrs. Gobat went, in the spring of 1878, to Europe, and while in Switzerland, he had a slight attack of apoplexy. They were not quite decided about returning, but the bishop said to his wife, "Let us come back to Jerusalem to die", both feeling that Jerusalem was their only home. The husband was so feeble that it was with the greatest difficulty they accomplished the journey back to Jerusalem. He died on 11 May 1879, at the age of eighty.

This was a crushing blow to Mrs. Gobat. She said repeatedly, "I have no more work to do in Jerusalem; my task is finished." On Sunday, though not really ill, she asked to be prayed for in the public services—not that she might get well, but that she might be ready to die. On Monday, she was feverish, and the doctor recommended that she stay in bed. She liked to have the children with her, but gradually became indifferent to everything. On the Thursday night, she lost consciousness. She was very restless for some hours, having acute inflammation of the brain, and died on 1 August 1879. The couple were buried side by side under an olive tree on Mount Zion.

Mrs. Gobat was accustomed to pray in German as a rule, that being her mother tongue; but among her remains were found some prayers in English.
