= Tørres Christensen =

Tørres Christensen (10 May 1664 – 15 February 1721) was a Norwegian timber merchant, sawmill owner, landowner and ship owner.

He was born at the village of Nedenes in Øyestad Municipality (now part of Arendal Municipality) in Nedenes county, Norway. He attended the Bergen Cathedral School. By 1682, he was enrolled as skipper in the service of the Danish King. He settled in Mandal in Vest-Agder during 1687, where he married Karen Mortensdatter Als (1666–1743), daughter of Morten Mortensen Als(d. 1691), the leading merchant of the town.

After the death of his father-in-law in 1691, Christensen took over the business and became the dominant merchant in Mandal. He greatly expanded by establishing himself as a merchant and shipowner in Kristiansand. During the Great Northern War (1700–1721), he controlled large parts of the timber trade from the valley of Mandalen. He also continued in a few more years to sail as skipper on his own ships. As the dominant employer, merchant, creditor and landowner in Mandal, he ran the small town almost like a business. Christensen owned property both in Mandal and Kristiansand. He held several farms, several with salmon fishing rights, including Halshaug gård in Lister og Mandal county which was located at the mouth of river Mandalselva.

== Other sources ==
- Syrdahl, Arvid (1998) Kongen av Mandal (MediaFoto A.S., Mandal) ISBN 82-994900-4-9
