= Pierce Lewis =

Pierce Lewis (11 April 1664 – May 1699) was a Welsh cleric who helped to "correct" the 1690 edition of the Welsh Bible.

Lewis was born to Pierce and Elizabeth Lewis, who lived on Anglesey in North Wales. His father was the registrar of the Diocese of Bangor. In 1684, Lewis matriculated at Jesus College, Oxford, and obtained a Bachelor of Arts degree in 1684. He appears to have stayed in Oxford to supervise the production of the Bible associated with his relative William Lloyd, who was Bishop of St Asaph at the time. This edition was not well received. He then obtained the living of Llanfachraeth, Anglesey in 1690, becoming vicar of Bangor in 1693 and rector of Llanfairfechan in 1698. He died in Ruthin in May 1699.
