= Juan de Esteyneffer =

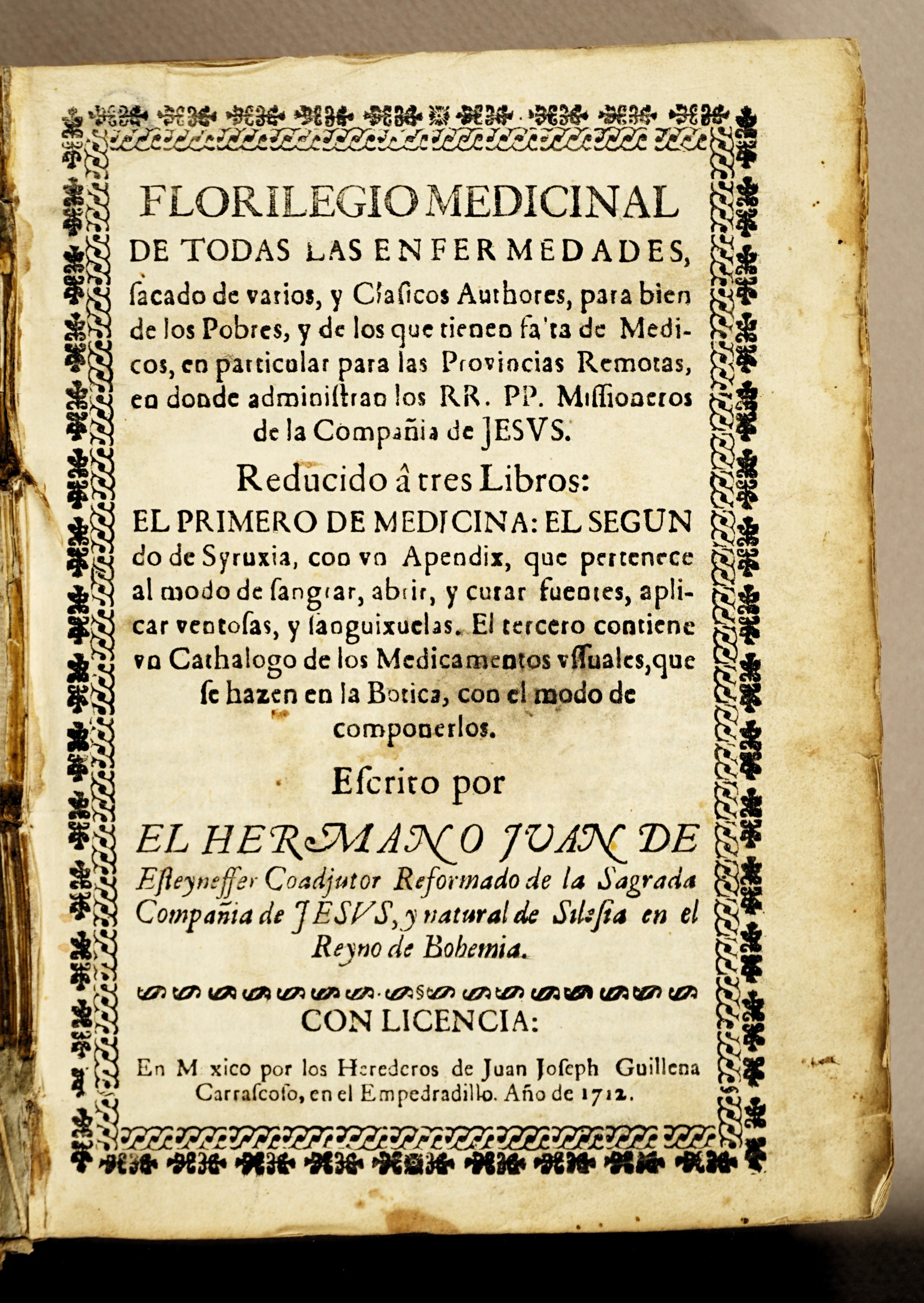
Title page, Florilegio Medicinal, 1712

Juan de Esteyneffer (March 4, 1664 – 1716) was a Moravian German lay Jesuit missionary sent to the New World. He is known for his 1711 work Florilegio Medicinal, which compiled a combination of New World traditional medicine, European materia medica, and 18th-century European medical diagnosis.

Esteyneffer was born in Iglau, Moravia. His original German name is unclear; Juan de Esteyneffer was its rendering in Spanish, and the last name is also variously given as Steinhofer, Steinhöfer, Steinheffer, Steineffer, or Estainefer. He joined the Jesuits on September 27, 1686, and studied pharmacy in Brno. He was sent to the Jesuit College at Chihuahua to help care for elderly and ill missionaries. While there, he compiled the Florilegio medicinal, completing it in 1711, with a first publication in 1712 (Mexico: Heirs of J. J. Guillena Carrascoso, 1712). The work combined traditional European and New World medical lore with what was then modern medical science, and anthropologist Margarita Artschwager Kay posits that it served to standardize herbal therapy in Northern Mexico and the Southwestern United States.

Esteyneffer died in 1716, while visiting Sonora.
