= George Gobat =

French Jesuit theologian

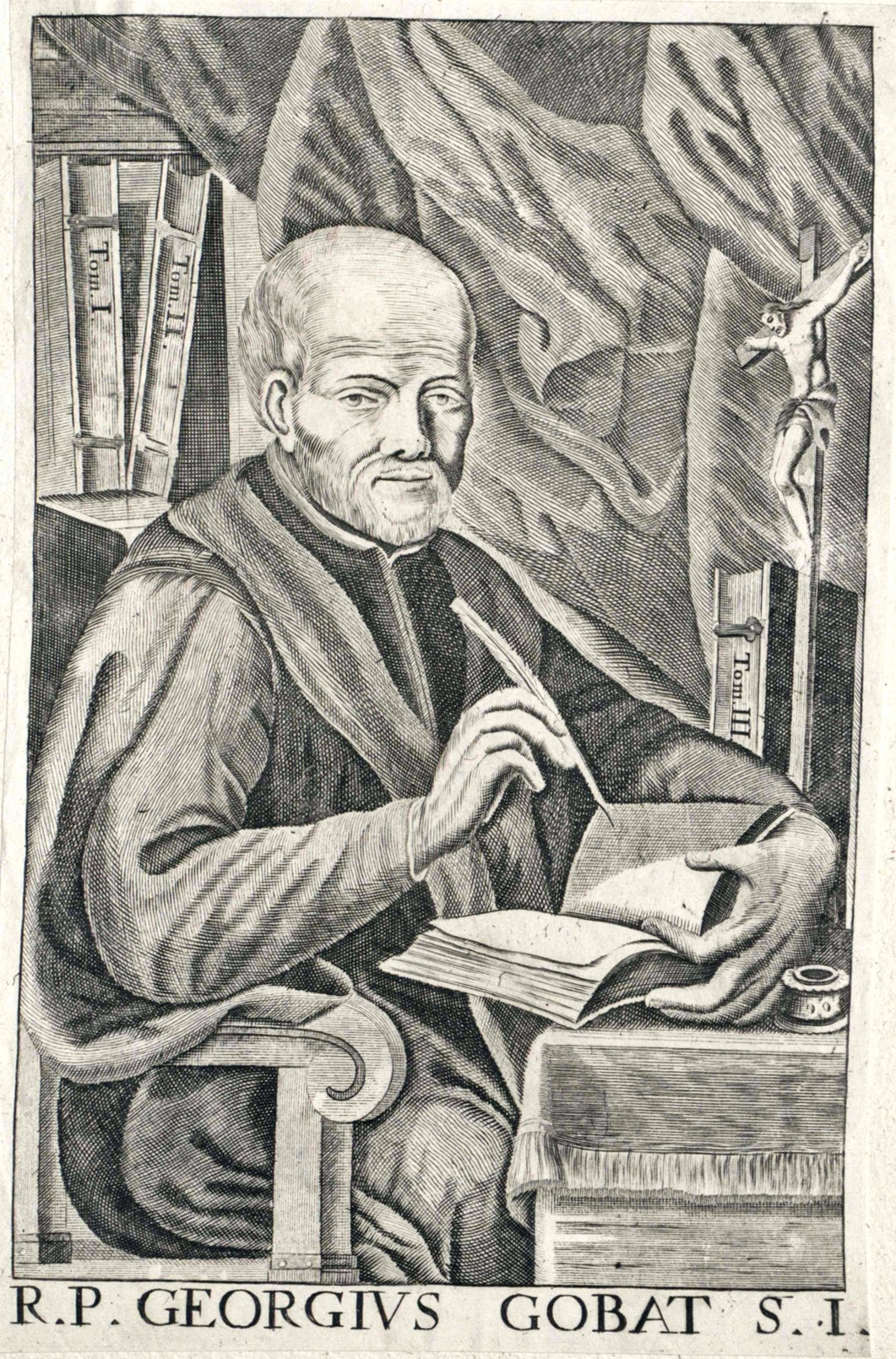
George Gobat

George Gobat (born at Charmoilles, in the Diocese of Basel, 1 July 1600; died 23 March 1679) was a French Jesuit theologian.

== Life ==
Gobat entered the Society of Jesus, 1 June 1618. After teaching the humanities he was professor of sacred sciences at Fribourg, Switzerland (1631–41), and of moral theology at the Jesuit college in Halle, Belgium (1641–44). He then was at Munich (1644–47), rector at Halle (1647–51), and professor of moral theology at Ratisbon (1651–54). He was rector at Fribourg (1654–56), and professor of moral theology at Constance (1656–60), where he was also canon penitentiary of the cathedral, a post he retained until his death.

== Works ==
Gobat's works include:

- Disputationes in Aristotelem (Fribourg, 1633–34)
- Narratio historica eorum quæ Societatis Jesu in Nova Francia fortiter egit et passa est anno 1648-49, a translation of a French work by Paul Ragueneau
- Alphabetum quadraplex de voto, juramento, blasphemia, superstitione, a collection of practical cases on the Sacraments (republished at Munich in 1669 and Constance in 1670 and 1672 as Experentiæ Theologicæ sive experimentalis theologia)
- a number of smaller works on the Jubilee

These were republished several times in three volumes under the title Opera Moralia, including at Douai in 1701 and Venice in 1749. Following the casuistic method, Gobat applies questions of theology to contemporary conditions in Germany, drawing on his experiences in the confessional and on cases referred to him for settlement.

Several of Gobat's doctrines were later condemned by the Holy See, including by Pope Innocent XI in 1679, the year of Gobat's death. Guy de Sève de Rochechouart, the Bishop of Arras, published thirty-two propositions condemning the 1701 Douai edition of the Opera Moralia. Writers in France, Germany, and Holland criticized the Jesuits based on this condemnation of Gobat's teaching; other Jesuits wrote in his defense. Works defending Gobat include Apologie pour la doctrine des Jésuites (Liege, 1703) by Gabriel Daniel, and Vindiciæ Gobatianæ (Ingolstadt, 1706) by Johann Christoph Raßler.
