= Antoine de Laloubère =

Infamous mathematician (1600–1664)

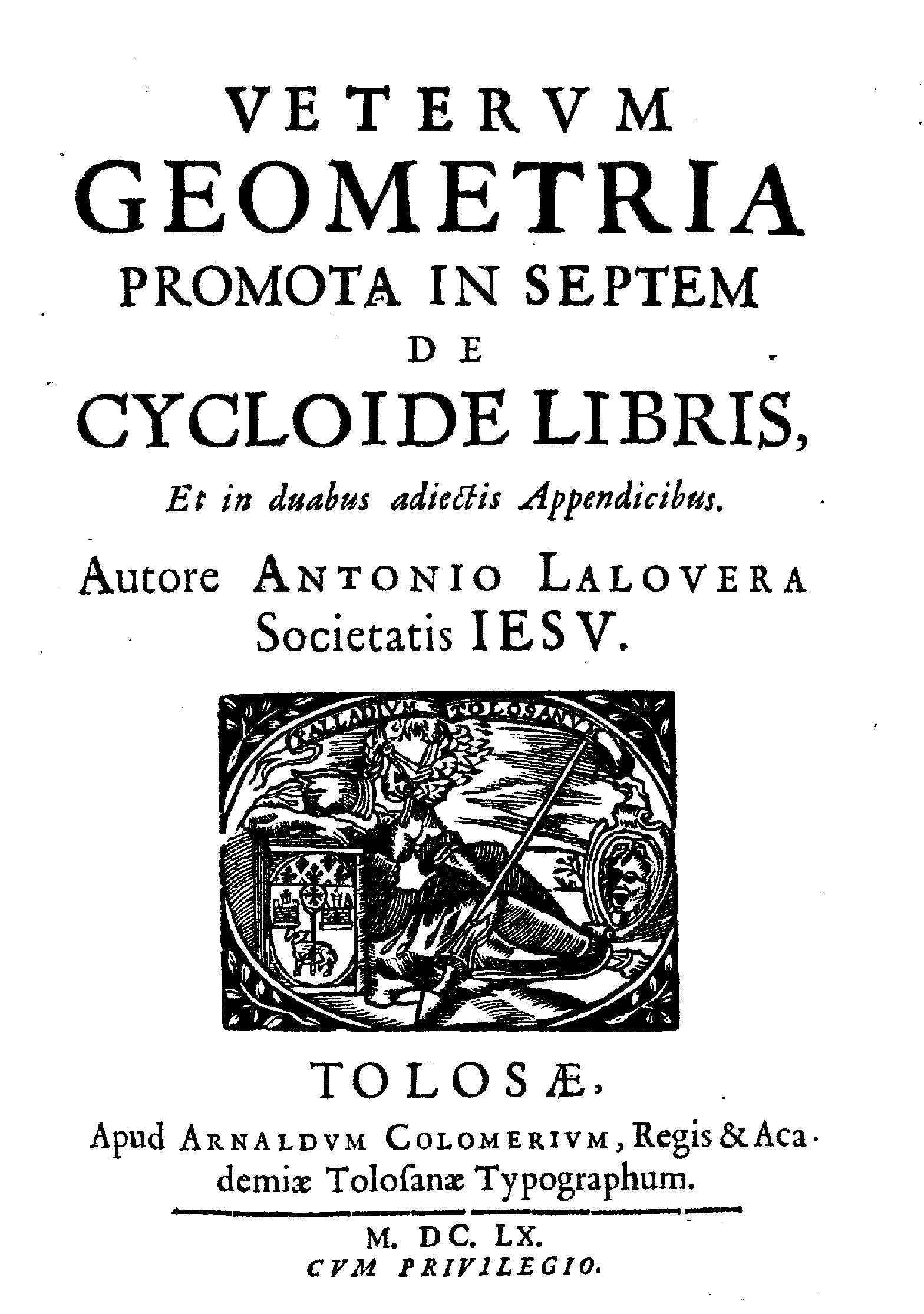
Veterum geometria promota in septem de cycloide libris, 1660

Antoine de Laloubère, also Lalouvère and other forms, (24 August 1600 – 2 September 1664), a Jesuit, born in Languedoc (Rieux-Volvestre, where his family had a castle), is chiefly known for an incorrect solution of Pascal's problems on the cycloid, which he gave in 1660, but he has a better claim to distinction in having been the first mathematician to study the properties of the helix.

== Biography ==
Antoine de Lalouvère was born into an aristocratic family. On July 9, 1620, at the age of 20, he entered the Society of Jesus in Toulouse. After completing his religious training, he was ordained a priest in 1631 or 1632. He later taught humanities, rhetoric, theology, Hebrew and mathematics at the jesuit college of Toulouse.

With Cavalieri, Fermat, Vincentio, Kepler, Torricelli and Valerio, Lalouvere can be considered one of the forerunners of modern integral calculus. In his main work of 1651, Quadratura Circuli, he calculates volumes and centers of gravity by inverting the rule of Paul Guldin. As a geometer Lalouvère is also the first to have studied the properties of the helix.

In 1658, he was engaged in a resounding controversy with Blaise Pascal who accused him of plagiarizing Gilles de Roberval's solution of the ″roulette″ problem. Pascal advertised in 1658 a prize for problems about bodies formed by cycloides (volumes, center of mass), to which Laloubére contributed a solution sent to Pascal, which was faulty and was not accepted by Pascal. The accusation of Pascal seems now unfounded. This conflict revived Lalouvère's interest in geometry - at that time he was a professor of theology - and he composed in 1660 'Veterum geometria promota in septem de cycloide libris'.

De Laloubère died at Toulouse on September 2, 1664.

== Works ==
- Quadratura Circuli Et Hyperbolae Segmentorum, 1651;
- De Cycloide Galilaei et Torricelli propositions viginli, Toulouse, août 1658;
- Responsio ad duplicem quaestionem moralem, Toulouse, 11 décembre 1658;
- Veterum Geometrica promota in septem de Cycloide Libris et in duobus adjectis Apprendicibus (with Arnaldum Colomerium), Toulouse, 1660 .

== See also ==
- List of Jesuit scientists
- List of Roman Catholic scientist-clerics

== Bibliography ==
- Joseph MacDonnell, Jesuit geometers, St Louis (États-Unis), Inst. of Jesuit sources, 1989.
- Michel Serfati, Dominique Descotes, Mathématiciens français du xvii^{e} siècle : Descartes, Fermat, Pascal, Presses universitaires Blaise Pascal, 2008.
- Marie Couton, Emprunt, plagiat, réécriture aux XV^{e}, XVI^{e}, xvii^{e} siècles : pour un nouvel éclairage sur la pratique des Lettres à La Renaissance, Université de Clermont-Ferrand II, Presses universitaires Blaise Pascal, Clermont-Ferrand, 2008.
- Herbert Oettel: Lalouvère, Antoine de, in: Dictionary of Scientific Biography, Volume 7, p. 583-584
- Paul Tannery: Pascal et Lalouvère, Mémoires de la Societé des Sciences Physiques et Naturelles de Bordeaux, Ser. 3, Volume 5, 1890, p. 55-84 .
