= Rinoie Motohiro =

Korean samurai (1589–1647)

Rinoie Motohiro (Japanese: 李家元宥; 1589–1647) was a samurai from Joseon who served the Mōri clan and retainer of Chōshū Domain in the early Edo period. He was the son of Korean commander and politician Yi Bok-nam.

== Life ==
In 1589, Rinoie was born in Joseon as Yi Gyeong-bu (Korean: 이경보; Hanja: 李聖賢). When he was a child, the Imjin War occurred. In 1597, his father was killed in the Siege of Namwon. He was captured by Asonuma Motonobu, the retainer of Mōri and brought to Japan. He brought his military equipment with the Chinese letter 李家龍虎 (Dragon and Tiger of Yi clan) engraved on it.

He learned the Japanese language in Japan. He was summoned by Mōri Terumoto and given the territory of 100 koku in Katsuma, Kumage District. He also became the otogishū (adviser) of the Mōri clan.

He became a Buddhist priest and took the name Motohiro using the character 元 (moto) given by Terumoto from his own name. His surname Rinoie (李家) means "house of Yi" in Japanese.

Rinoie learned kenjutsu from Ōno Ienobu a.k.a. Yagyū Ienobu, one of the finest disciples of Yagyū Muneyoshi. He was left with Uchidachi by Ienobu and given the menkyo of Yagyū Shinkage-ryū. Furthermore, at Ienobu's death, Rinoie was given his own Yari and katana.

Rinoie died in 1647 at the age of 59.

== See also ==
- William Adams
- Jan Joosten van Lodensteijn
- List of foreign-born samurai in Japan
- Yagyū Shume - Korean samurai who served Yagyū clan
- Wakita Naokata
- Yasuke
