= African Samurai =

2019 book by Thomas Lockley and Geoffrey Girard

- Author: Thomas Lockley and Geoffrey Girard
- Language: English
- Publisher: Hanover Square Press
- Publication date: 2019
- Pages: 464
- ISBN: 978-1-335-14102-6

African Samurai: The True Story of Yasuke, a Legendary Black Warrior in Feudal Japan is a book about the history of African samurai Yasuke. It was written by British academic Thomas Lockley and American novelist Geoffrey Girard, and published by Hanover Square Press in 2019.
