= Yasuke =

African samurai

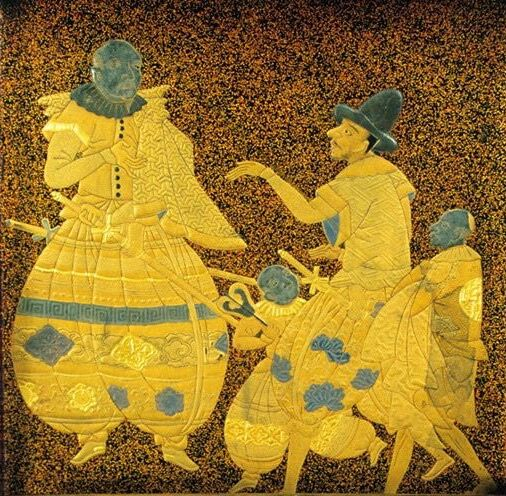
- Rimpa-style suzuri-bako (detail) from 1590s possibly depicting Yasuke
- Born: c. 1555; Portuguese Mozambique (most likely)
- Died: After June 1582 (aged 27 or older)
- Military career
- Allegiance: Jesuits, Alessandro Valignano; Oda clan, Oda Nobunaga (1581–1582)
- Conflicts: Honnō-ji Incident

Yasuke (Japanese: 弥助 / 弥介; pronounced [jasɯ̥ke]) was a samurai of African origin who served Oda Nobunaga between 1581 and 1582, during the Sengoku period, until Nobunaga's death. (Note: Attributed to multiple references:)

According to historical accounts, Yasuke first arrived in Japan in the service of Italian Jesuit Alessandro Valignano. Nobunaga summoned him out of a desire to see a black man. Subsequently, Nobunaga took him into his service and gave him the name Yasuke. As a samurai, he was granted a sword, a house, and a stipend. Yasuke accompanied Nobunaga until his death and fought at the Honnō-ji Incident until the death of Oda Nobutada. Afterwards, Yasuke was sent back to the Jesuits. There are no subsequent records of his life.

== Birth and early life ==
Yasuke is the first known African to appear in Japanese historical records. Much of what is known about him is found in fragmentary accounts in the letters of the Jesuit missionary Luís Fróis, Ōta Gyūichi's Shinchō Kōki (信長公記, Nobunaga Official Chronicle), Matsudaira Ietada's Matsudaira Ietada Nikki (松平家忠日記, Matsudaira Ietada Diary), Jean Crasset's Histoire de l'église du Japon and François Solier's Histoire Ecclesiastique des Isles et Royaumes du Japon.

The earliest record of Yasuke dates to 1581. He received his name from Oda Nobunaga. His birth name is unknown.

Based on Shinchō Kōki, Yasuke was estimated to be in his mid-twenties in 1581. Accounts from his time suggest Yasuke accompanied Alessandro Valignano from "the Indies", a term encompassing Portuguese overseas territories like Goa and Cochin (modern-day Goa and Kochi in India) as well as Portuguese Mozambique. Researcher Thomas Lockley has also proposed that Yasuke might have originated from the Dinka people of what is now South Sudan. A 1581 letter by Jesuit Lourenço Mexia and a later account from 1627 by François Solier refer to Yasuke as a Cafre. (Note: Originally, the Portuguese used the word Cafre, plural Cafres — from Arabic kāfir (كافر), meaning "infidels", "renegade" — to designate the non-Bantu peoples they encountered in southern Africa, particularly the Khoisan people of southern Africa. In Asia, the term was applied to individuals with dark skin, who were often enslaved.) Solier further described Yasuke as a More Cafre, which has been interpreted as "Moorish infidel", and identified him as a servant from Mozambique. Due to these descriptions, some historians have suggested that Yasuke may have been Muslim.

== Documented life in Japan ==
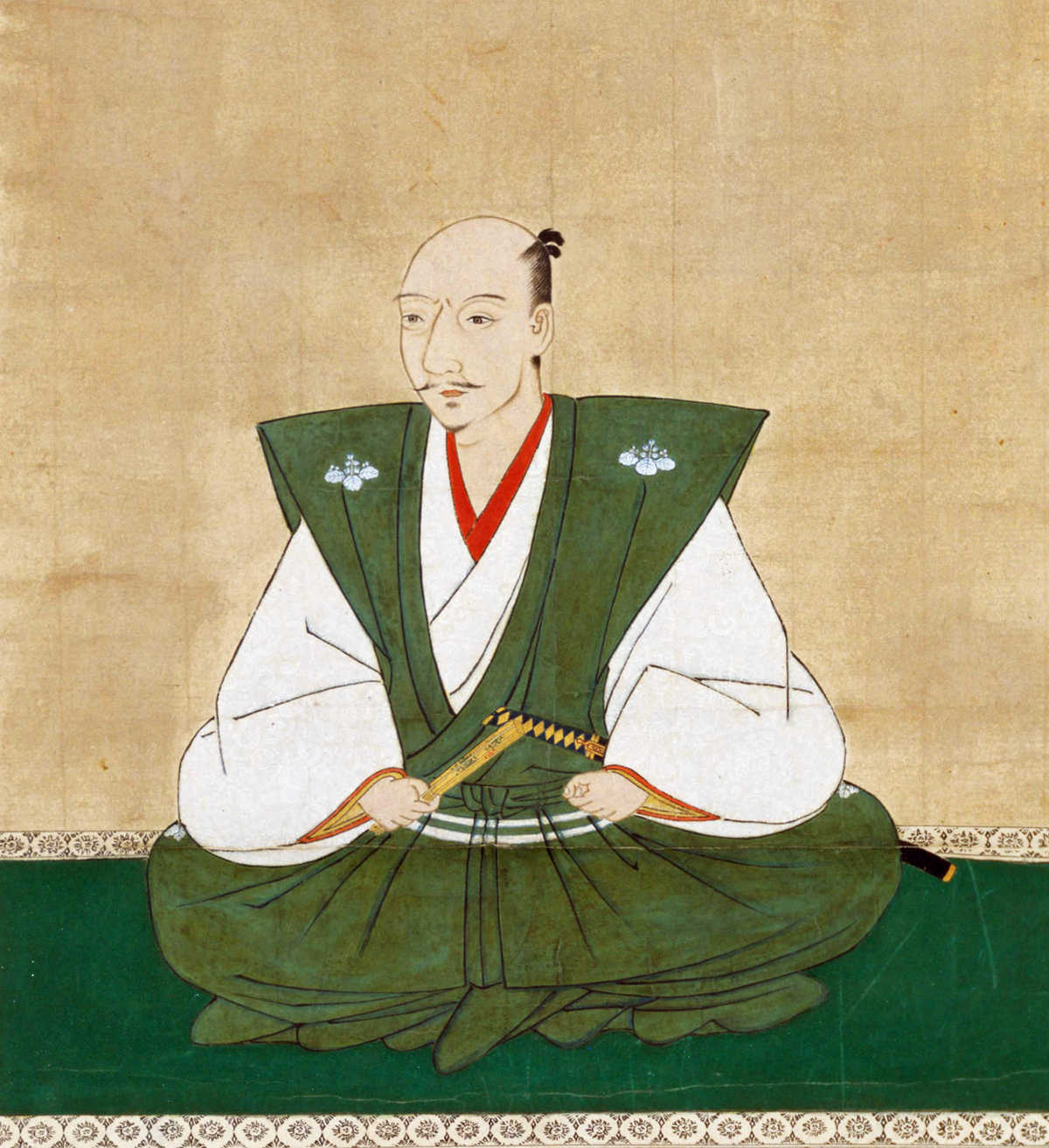
Oda Nobunaga, late 16th-century depiction

In 1579, Yasuke arrived in Japan in the service of the Italian Jesuit missionary Alessandro Valignano. Valignano had been appointed the Visitor (inspector) of the Jesuit missions in the Indies (which at that time meant East Africa, South, Southeast, and East Asia). Valignano's party spent the first two years of their stay in Japan, mainly in Kyushu.

Entering 1581, Valignano decided to visit the capital Kyoto as an envoy. He wanted to have an audience with Oda Nobunaga, the most powerful man in Japan, to ensure the Jesuits' missionary work before leaving Japan. These events are recorded in a 1581 letter Luís Fróis wrote to Lourenço Mexia, and in the 1582 Annual Report of the Jesuit Mission in Japan also by Fróis. These were published in Cartas que os padres e irmãos da Companhia de Jesus escreverão dos reynos de Japão e China II (1598), normally known simply as Cartas. On 27 March 1581, Valignano, together with Luís Fróis, who had arrived in Japan earlier, had an audience with Nobunaga, and Yasuke is said to have accompanied them as an attendant.

The Jesuit Luís Fróis wrote that while in the capital, a melee broke out among the local townsfolk who fought amongst themselves to catch a glimpse of Yasuke, which resulted in the breaking down of the door of a Jesuit residence and a number of deaths and injuries among the Japanese. Luís Fróis's Annual Report on Japan states that Nobunaga also longed to see a black man, and summoned him. Fr. Organtino took Yasuke to Nobunaga, who upon seeing a black man for the first time, refused to believe that his skin color was natural and not applied later, and made him remove his clothes from the belt upwards. Suspecting that Yasuke might have ink on his body, Nobunaga made him undress and wash his body, but the more Yasuke was washed and scrubbed, the darker his skin became. Nobunaga's children attended the event and one of his nephews gave Yasuke money.

The Shinchō Kōki manuscript describes Yasuke as follows:

On the 23rd of the Second Month, a blackamoor came from the Kirishitan Country. He appeared to be twenty-six or twenty-seven years old. Black over his whole body, just like an ox, this man looked robust and had a good demeanor. What is more, his formidable strength surpassed that of ten men. The Bateren brought him along by way of paying his respects to Nobunaga. Indeed, it was owing to Nobunaga's power and his glory that yet unheard-of treasures from the Three Countries and curiosities of this kind came to be seen here time and again, a blessing indeed.

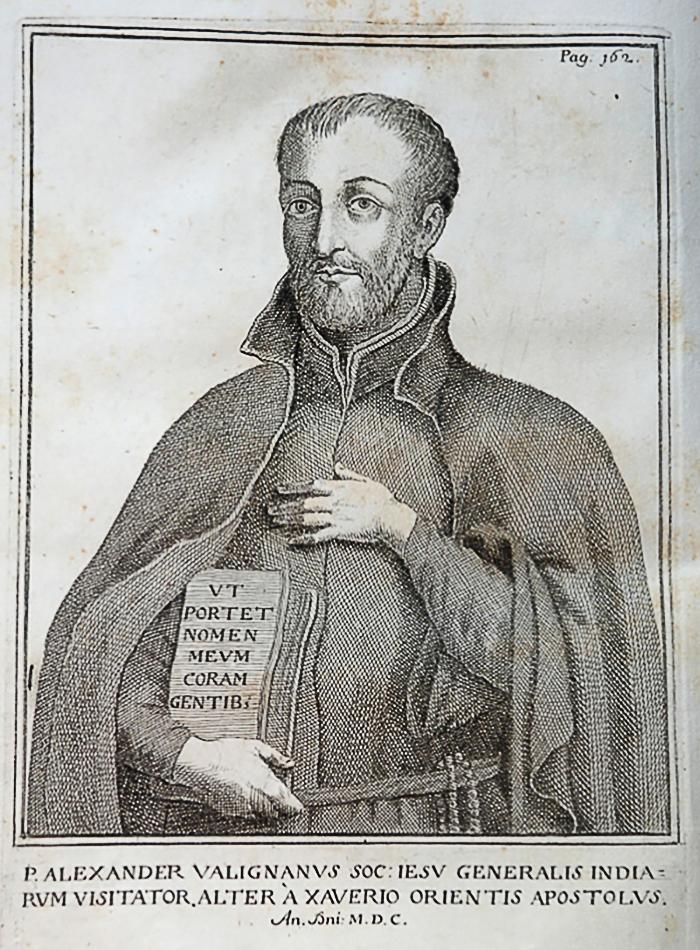
Alessandro Valignano, late 16th-century depiction

Nobunaga was impressed by Yasuke and asked Valignano to give him over. He gave him the Japanese name Yasuke, (Note: The origin of his name is unknown.) accepted him as an attendant at his side and made him the first recorded foreigner to receive the rank of samurai. Nobunaga granted Yasuke the honor of being his weapon-bearer and Yasuke served as some sort of bodyguard. According to historian Jonathan López-Vera, he was occasionally allowed to share meals with the warlord, a privilege extended to few other vassals.

The Shinchō Kōki of the Sonkeikaku Bunko (尊経閣文庫) archives states:

It was ordered that the young black man be given a stipend (扶持, fuchi), named Yasuke, and provided with a sword (さや巻, sayamaki), and a private residence. At times, he was also entrusted with carrying the master's weapons.

According to historians this was the equivalent to "the bestowing of warrior or 'samurai' rank" during this period. According to Lockley, Yasuke was also granted servants.

Father Lourenço Mexía wrote in a letter to Father Pero da Fonseca dated 8 October 1581:

The black man understood a little Japanese, and Nobunaga never tired of talking with him. And because he was strong and had a few skills, Nobunaga took great pleasure in protecting him and had him roam around the city of Kyoto with an attendant. Some people in the town said that Nobunaga might make him as tono ("lord").

Yasuke next appears in historical records on 11 May 1582. The Ietada Diary of Matsudaira Ietada, a vassal of Tokugawa Ieyasu, mentions that Yasuke accompanied Nobunaga on his inspection tour of the region after he destroyed his long-time arch-enemy, the Takeda clan of Kai. The description of 11 May 1582 states:

Nobunaga-sama was accompanied by a black man who was presented to him by the missionaries and to whom he gave a stipend. His body was black like ink and he was 6 shaku 2 bu [182.4 cm or approximately 6'0"] tall. His name was said to be Yasuke.

According to Fujita, on 14 May 1581, Yasuke departed for Echizen Province with Fróis and the other Christians. (Note: Midori Fujita says that during this trip they met local warlords such as Shibata Katsutoyo, Hashiba Hidekatsu, and Shibata Katsuie.) They returned to Kyoto on May 30.

== Honnō-ji Incident ==
On 21 June 1582, Oda Nobunaga was betrayed and attacked by his senior vassal Akechi Mitsuhide at Honnō-ji temple in Kyoto, an event known as the Honnō-ji Incident. At the time of the attack, Nobunaga was accompanied by a retinue of about 30 followers, including Yasuke. They fought but were defeated by the Akechi's forces, and Nobunaga committed seppuku.

On the same day, after his lord's death, Yasuke joined the forces of Nobutada, Nobunaga's eldest son and heir, who was garrisoned at the nearby Nijō-goshō imperial villa. They fought against the Akechi clan but were overwhelmed. Yasuke was captured by Mitsuhide's vassals, then sent to the Jesuits by Mitsuhide who suggested that because Yasuke was not Japanese, his life should be spared.

Japanese historians Midori Fujita and Ōwada Yasutsune speculate that Mitsuhide may have made this statement out of an inclination toward mercy, while Lockley suggests that it may have been an expedient to help Mitsuhide win over the Jesuits and Japanese Christians; there are no historical documents, however, to show definitively whether either was the case, or if statement was otherwise motivated (e.g. by disdain for foreigners, or for Yasuke in particular). It is certain that Yasuke did not die. Mitsuhide's vassals accompanied him to a Jesuit church, and Luís Fróis wrote five months after the Honnō-ji Incident thanking God that he did not lose his life. However, there are no historical sources about him since then and what happened to him afterwards is unknown. It is possible that Yasuke died during the Battle of Okitanawate.

== Possible depictions of Yasuke ==
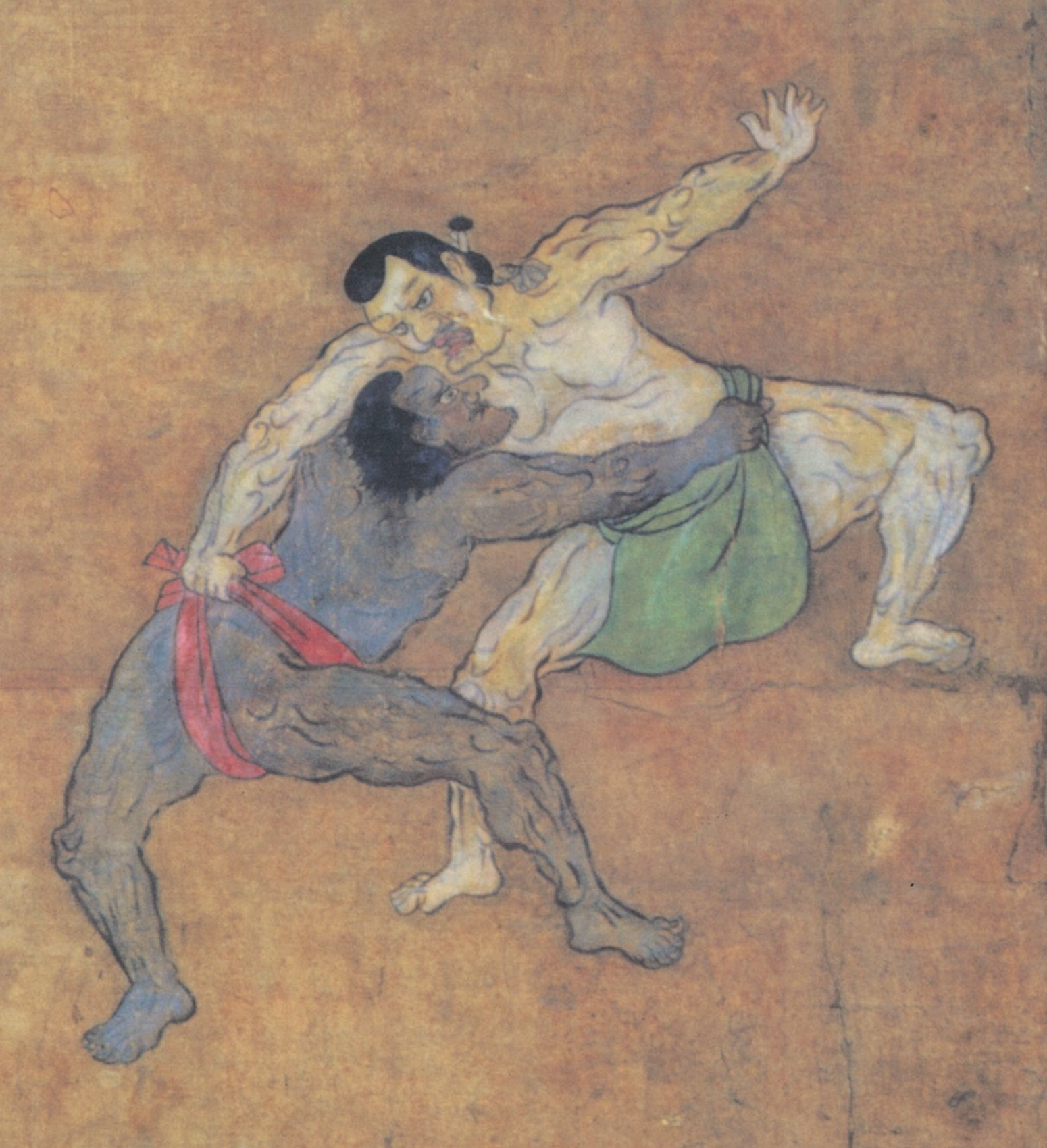
Detail from the Sumō Yūrakuzu Byōbu, drawn in 1605. It has been suggested that the dark-skinned man on the left is Yasuke.

The Sumō Yūrakuzu Byōbu (相撲遊楽図屏風; Sakai City Museum collection), drawn in 1605 by an anonymous artist, depicts a dark-skinned man wrestling a Japanese man in the presence of noble samurai. There are various theories regarding the work: some believe that this samurai is Oda Nobunaga or Toyotomi Hidetsugu, while others believe that the dark-skinned man wrestling in the center is Yasuke and the one further to the right of the wrestlers (not depicted in the detailed image), playing the role of a gyōji (referee), is Oda Nobunaga.

An ink-stone box (suzuri-bako) made by a Rinpa artist in the 1590s, owned by Museu do Caramulo, depicts a black man wearing Portuguese high-class clothing. Author Thomas Lockley argues that it could be Yasuke, as he does not appear to be subservient to the other Portuguese man in the work.

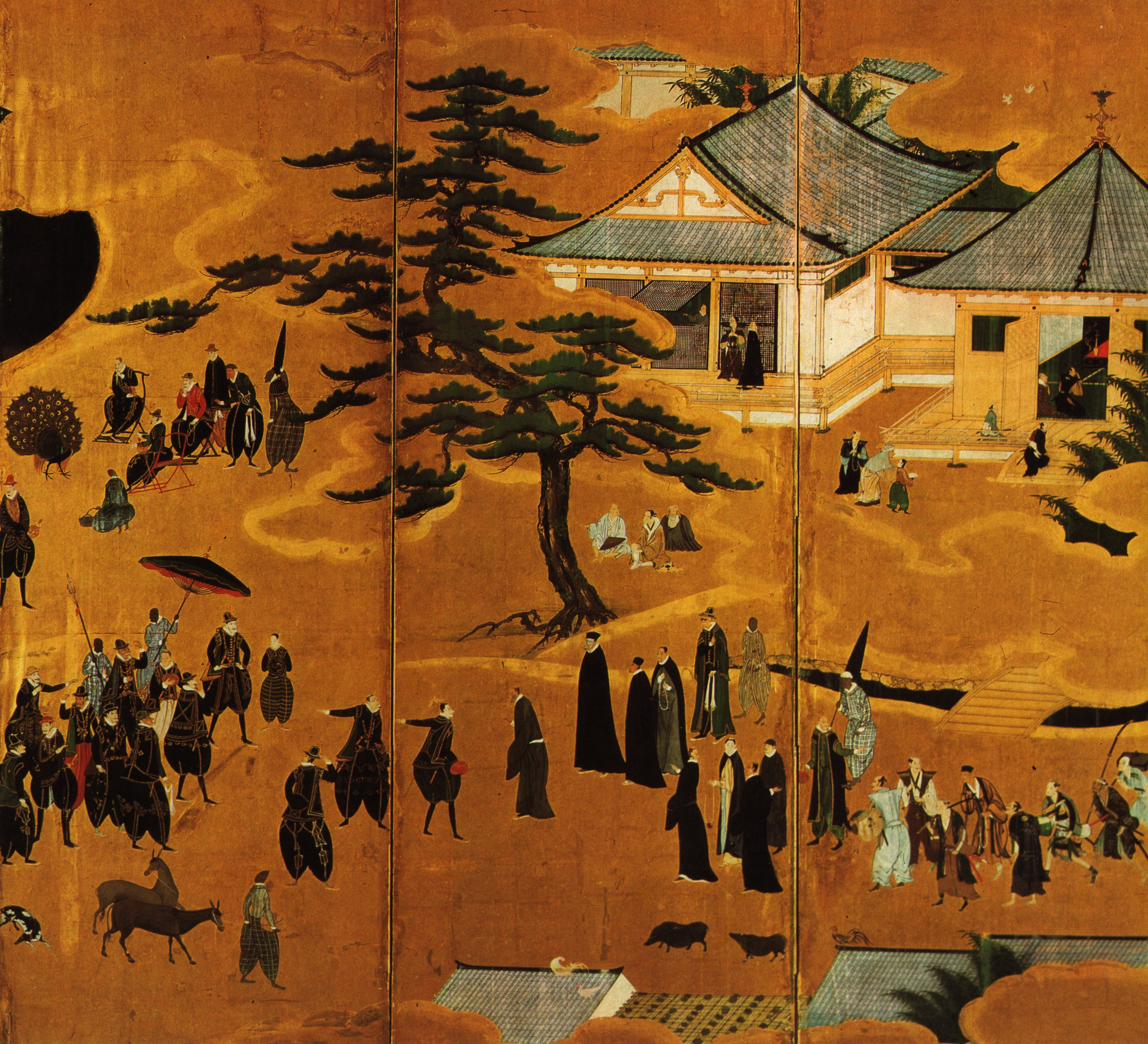
Nanban byōbu (painted by Kano Naizen), Europeans and their African followers, c. 1600

A Nanban byōbu painted by Kanō Naizen, a painter active in the same period, depicts dark-skinned followers holding parasols over Europeans as well as a spear. It was not uncommon for individual Africans to be brought to Japan as attendants of Jesuit missionaries.

== In popular culture ==
=== Literature ===
- In 1968, author Yoshio Kurusu and artist Genjirō Mita published a children's book about Yasuke titled Kurosuke (くろ助). The following year, the book won the Japanese Association of Writers for Children Prize (日本児童文学者協会賞, Nihon Jidō Bungakusha Kyōkai-shō).
- Yasuke inspired the 1971 satirical novel Kuronbō (黒ん坊) by Shūsaku Endō.
- Yasuke appears in the 2008 novel Momoyama Beat Tribe as one of the main characters. This novel was later made into a play in 2017.
- Kamiya Sōtan no Nokoshita Nikki (神屋宗湛の残した日記) by Masuji Ibuse, published in 1995. A historical novel based on the diary of famous Tea Master and merchant Kamiya Sōtan, Yasuke appears during Akechi Mitsuhide's surprise attack on Honnō-ji Temple. Yasuke pulls Sōtan out of the flames and guides him from the burning temple grounds to reach the nearby Jesuit monastery, before rushing back to aid in Nobutada's defense at Nijō-goshō.

=== Manga and anime ===
- Yasuke appears as Alessandro Valignano's servant in volume 29 of the ongoing manga series The Knife and the Sword by Takurō Kajikawa.
- The ongoing time-travel manga series Nobunaga Concerto by Ayumi Ishii portrays Yasuke as a black baseball player from the present day.
- Yasuke was the inspiration for Takashi Okazaki's Afro Samurai franchise.
- Yasuke plays a minor role in the 2005 to 2017 manga series Hyouge Mono by Yoshihiro Yamada.
- Yasuke is featured in the 2016 to 2020 manga series Nobunaga o Koroshita Otoko (信長を殺した男; "The Man Who Killed Nobunaga") by Akechi Kenzaburō and Yutaka Tōdō.
- Yasuke is the main protagonist in the 2021 Netflix anime series Yasuke, created by LeSean Thomas and animated by MAPPA. He is voiced by Jun Soejima in Japanese and LaKeith Stanfield in English.

=== Film ===
- In March 2017, Lionsgate announced plans for a live-action film about Yasuke titled Black Samurai. In May 2019, Deadline reported that the film, retitled Yasuke, had left Lionsgate for Picturestart. Chadwick Boseman signed on to portray Yasuke. The project appears to have been cancelled after Boseman's death on August 28, 2020. As of May 2025, Picturestart's official website states that the film is "in development".
- In April 2019, MGM announced plans for their own live-action film about Yasuke, to be produced by Andrew Mittman and Lloyd Braun of Whalerock Industries, with a script written by Stuart C. Paul. The script was included in The Black List of most liked unproduced scripts for 2021.
- In the 2023 historical drama film Kubi directed by Takeshi Kitano, Yasuke, in another portrayal by Jun Soejima, served as a retainer to Oda Nobunaga.
- In April 2024, a new feature film spec script titled Black Samurai written by Blitz Bazawule was acquired by Warner Bros. for Bazawule to direct.

=== Video games ===
- Yasuke is a recurring minor character in Koei Tecmo's Nobunaga's Ambition series, appearing in the 1992 video game Nobunaga's Ambition: Tales of the Conquerors as a character added in the expansion pack, and returning in 2013's Nobunaga's Ambition: Sphere of Influence as a recruitable officer.
- Koei Tecmo's 2017 video game Nioh and its 2020 sequel features a portrayal of Yasuke as a boss fight, voiced by Richie Campbell.
- Koei Tecmo's 2021 video game Samurai Warriors 5 includes Yasuke as a playable character, voiced by Paddy Ryan.
- A black samurai inspired by Yasuke, named Nagoriyuki, appears in Arc System Works' 2021 fighting game Guilty Gear Strive.
- Yasuke is one of the protagonists of Ubisoft's video game Assassin's Creed Shadows, voiced by Tongayi Chirisa.

=== Music ===
- In 2016, French electronic music producer Pépé Bradock released the track "Yazuke" on his label Atavisme.
- In February 2023, the Brazilian samba school Mocidade Alegre of the São Paulo city carnival performed a samba song about Yasuke, winning that year's competition.

== See also ==
- Black people in Japan
- List of foreign-born samurai in Japan
- William Adams
- Jan Joosten van Lodensteijn
- Wakita Naokata
- Rinoie Motohiro
- Yagyū Shume
