= List of foreign-born samurai in Japan =

This is a list of foreign-born people who became samurai in Japan. During the Edo period (1603–1868), some foreigners in Japan were granted privileges associated with samurai, including fiefs or stipends and the right to carry two swords. Even earlier, during the Azuchi–Momoyama period (1568–1600), certain foreigners received similar benefits. Whether these individuals were members of the warrior class (bushi) is a subject of debate among some historians. While debate among some historians exist, the general historical consensus is that those individuals were most likely members of the warrior class (bushi) and thus, were samurai.

== List ==
Birthplace	Original name	Original occupation	Year of arrival	Japanese name	Lord	Stipend, title, and misc. notes
Portuguese Mozambique? (now Mozambique)	unknown	Servant of Jesuit missionary Alessandro Valignano	1579	Yasuke 弥助	Oda Nobunaga	Served as Weapon-bearer and bodyguard. He fought during the Honnō-ji incident. He accompanied Nobunaga during the inspection tour of the recently conquered Koshu.
Hanseong, Joseon (now South Korea)	Kim Yeo-cheol (金如鐵)	Son of Kim Si-seong (金時省), civil officer of Joseon	1592	Wakita Naokata 脇田直賢	Maeda Toshinaga→ Maeda Toshitsune→ Maeda Mitsutaka→ Maeda Tsunanori	He received a stipend of 240 koku later increased to 1,000 koku. Received the Head of Pages title. Commissioner of Kanazawa city. He served in the Summer Campaign of the Siege of Osaka.
Joseon	unknown	Son of Jeung Cheong-gwan (曾淸官), commanding officer of Joseon	1598	Soga Seikan 曾我清官	Nakagawa Hidenari	He received a stipend of 150 koku. Page of Hidenari.
Joseon	Yi Seong-hyeon (李聖賢)	Son of Yi Bok-nam, commander of Joseon	1598	Rinoie Motohiro 李家元宥	Mōri Terumoto→ Mōri Hidenari	100 koku. Adviser of the Mori clan. He was the swordsman who received the menkyo of the Yagyū Shinkage-ryū.
Delft, Dutch Republic	Jan Joosten van Lodensteijn	Mate of the De Liefde, a Dutch ship	1600	Yayōsu 耶楊子	Tokugawa Ieyasu→ Tokugawa Hidetada	He was given a stipend of 100 koku. He was given the rank of Hatamoto and 50 servants. Under the Tokugawa Shogunate, he chartered several Red Seal Ships.
Gillingham, Kent, Kingdom of England	William Adams	Pilot of the De Liefde, a Dutch ship	1600	Miura Anjin (the pilot of Miura) 三浦按針	Tokugawa Ieyasu→ Tokugawa Hidetada	250 koku. He was granted the rank of Hatamoto, a fief and 80-90 servants. Interpreter and shipwright of the Tokugawa Shogunate. Adams was the model for the character John Blackthorne in James Clavell's novel Shōgun (1975).
Joseon	unknown	unknown	unknown	Yagyū Shume 柳生主馬	Yagyū Munenori→ Yagyū "Jūbei" Mitsuyoshi→ Yagyū Munefuyu	Retainer of the Yagyū clan. 200 koku? He married the sister of Yagyū "Hyōgonosuke" Toshitoshi.
Henan, Ming dynasty (now China)	Lan Huirong (藍會榮)	The member of the inner circle of the Ming dynasty	After 1624	Kawaminami Genbei (First) 河南源兵衛	Shimazu Iehisa	300 koku. He was a political refugee from the Ming, and the Tōtsūji (Chinese translator) of the Satsuma domain. He was given the right to bear swords.

== Gallery ==
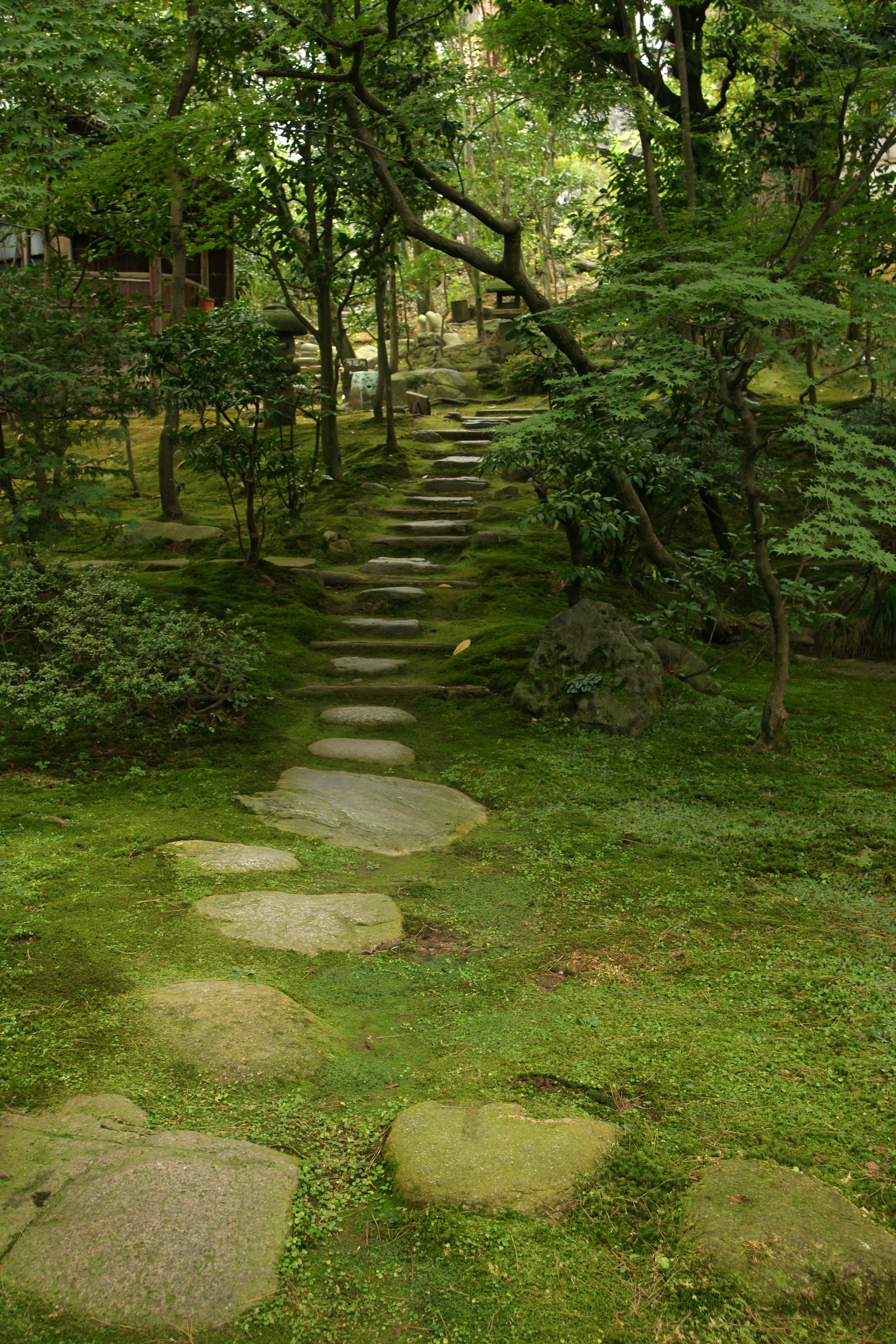
Gyokusen-en, Japanese garden made by the Korean samurai Wakita Naokata and his descendants

== See also ==
- List of Westerners who visited Japan before 1868
- French military mission to Japan (1867–1868)
- Denrinbō Raikei, a Chinese-born ninja
- Eugène Collache
- Henry Schnell
- The Last Samurai
