= Pencil case =

Container used to store pencils and other stationery

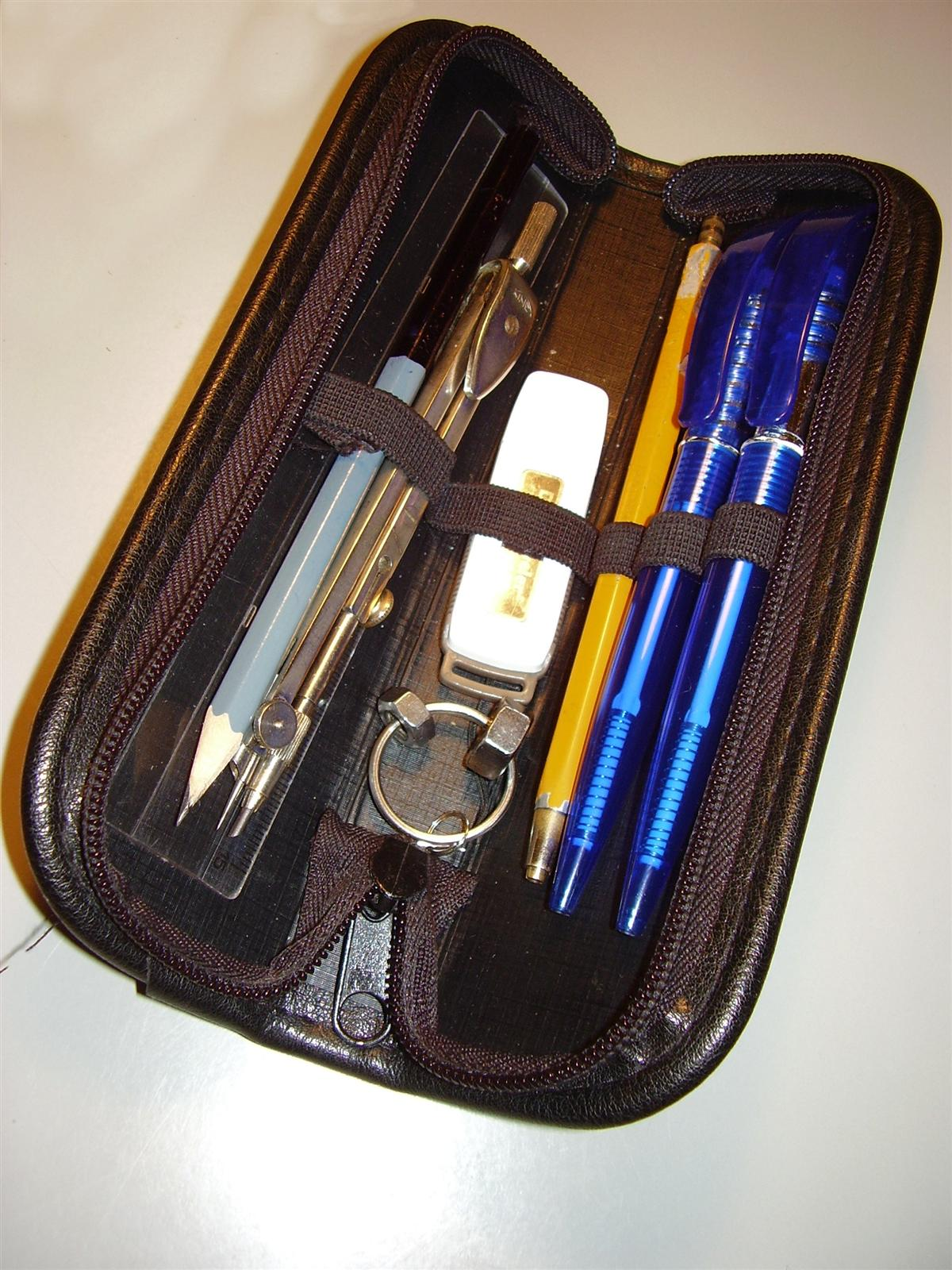
A pencil case

A pencil case or pencil box is a container used to store pencils. A pencil case can also contain a variety of other stationery such as sharpeners, pens, glue sticks, erasers, scissors, and rulers.

Pencil cases can be made from a variety of materials such as wood or metal. Some pencil cases have a hard and rigid shell encasing the pens inside, while others use a softer material such as plastic, leather or cotton. Soft versions are typically fastened with a zipper.

Early pencil cases were round or cylindrical in shape. Some early pencil cases were decorated with jasper (one from 1860) or platinum (from 1874).

== See also ==
- Pencils
- School
- Pencil sharpeners
- Marker pens
- Pens
- Suzuri-bako (Japanese writing box)
- Eraser
- Islamic pencil case or Islamic pencil box (Persian: قلمدان, romanized: qalamdan, lit. 'pencil case')
