= Yagyū Shume =

Korean retainer of the Yagyū clan

Yagyū Shume was a Korean-born retainer who served the Yagyū clan. Few records discuss his activity as a samurai. However, he is known as a central figure of the feud of Yagyū clan between Yagyū domain line from Yagyū Munenori and Owari domain line from Yagyū Toshitoshi.

== Life ==
The Gyokuei Shui (玉栄拾遺), written by Hagiwara Nobuyuki, a retainer of Yagyū domain, in 1753 mentions that "According to tradition, Shume was the blood of Joseon".

Furthermore, a Korean retainer of Yagyū, speculated to be Shune, was mentioned in Mimibukuro(耳嚢), an essay and kaidan written by Negishi Jin'e in the late 18th century. According to this source, Takuan Sōhō visited the mansion of Yagyū Munenori, and he found that a Ge (Japanese version of Gatha) hung at the guardhouse.

"Fishes and dragons live in blue sea; Mountains and woods are houses of animals; However even in those 66 provinces of Japan; There is no place I settle down." Takuan says that "This is interesting poem, though the last verse was defective". A gatekeeper replies: "There is no defect. It's my poem". This man was actually Korean who fled from Joseon. Munenori heard about him from Takuan, and soon employed him as samurai of 200 koku

This essay was written long after Shume's lifetime, and it is uncertain that this Korean man was actually Shume.

According to the Gyokuei Shui, Shume was a retainer of the Yagyū clan and married the sister of Toshitoshi through the efforts of Munenori. She had previously married Yamazaki Sōzaemon in Iga province, but the marriage broke down and she returned to her hometown. Toshitoshi was reportedly incensed that his sister married a man of Korean descent and broke off relations with Munenori.

According to『柳生藩旧記』(Yagyū han nikki, or Yagyū clan diary), Shume was originally named Sano Shume. This diary explained that Toshitoshi had become angry at the marriage because not only was Shume a foreigner, also a man Toshitoshi never met. Furthermore, Munenori allowed the marriage without consulting Toshitoshi.

After this event, the Yagyū domain line and Owari domain line never made peace. However, this was not just because Shume married Toshitoshi's sister. Toshitoshi was the son of Munenori's elder brother, Toshikatsu and believed himself to be the true successor of the Yagyū clan.

Shume died in 1651. He was buried in cemetery of Yagyū clan in Hōtokuji Temple.

== See also ==
- William Adams
- Jan Joosten van Lodensteijn
- List of foreign-born samurai in Japan
- Rinoie Motohiro - Korean-born swordsman who received menkyo of Yagyū Shinkage-ryū.
- Wakita Naokata
- Yasuke
