= Wakita Naokata =

Korean samurai (1585–1660)

Wakita Naokata (脇田 直賢; 1585–1660), Korean name Kim Yŏch'ŏl (Korean: 김여철; Hanja: 金如鉄), was a samurai who served the Maeda clan in the early Edo period. He was born in Joseon and was eventually given the position of Commissioner of Kanazawa city.

Born in Hanseong (now Seoul, of South Korea), Naokata's birth name was Gim Yeocheol. He was the son of Gim Si-seong (김시성; 金時省), an official of the Joseon government. In 1592, his father was killed during the Japanese invasions of Korea (1592–98). After Hanseong was captured by Japanese forces, Naokata was taken prisoner by the forces of Ukita Hideie. He was brought to Nagoya castle, then Okayama. He was raised by Hideie's wife Gō in Okayama. Next year, Gō went to Kanazawa and met her brother Maeda Toshinaga. Naokata was subsequently transferred to Toshinaga's service in Kanazawa, due to the request of Toshinga's wife, Eihime.

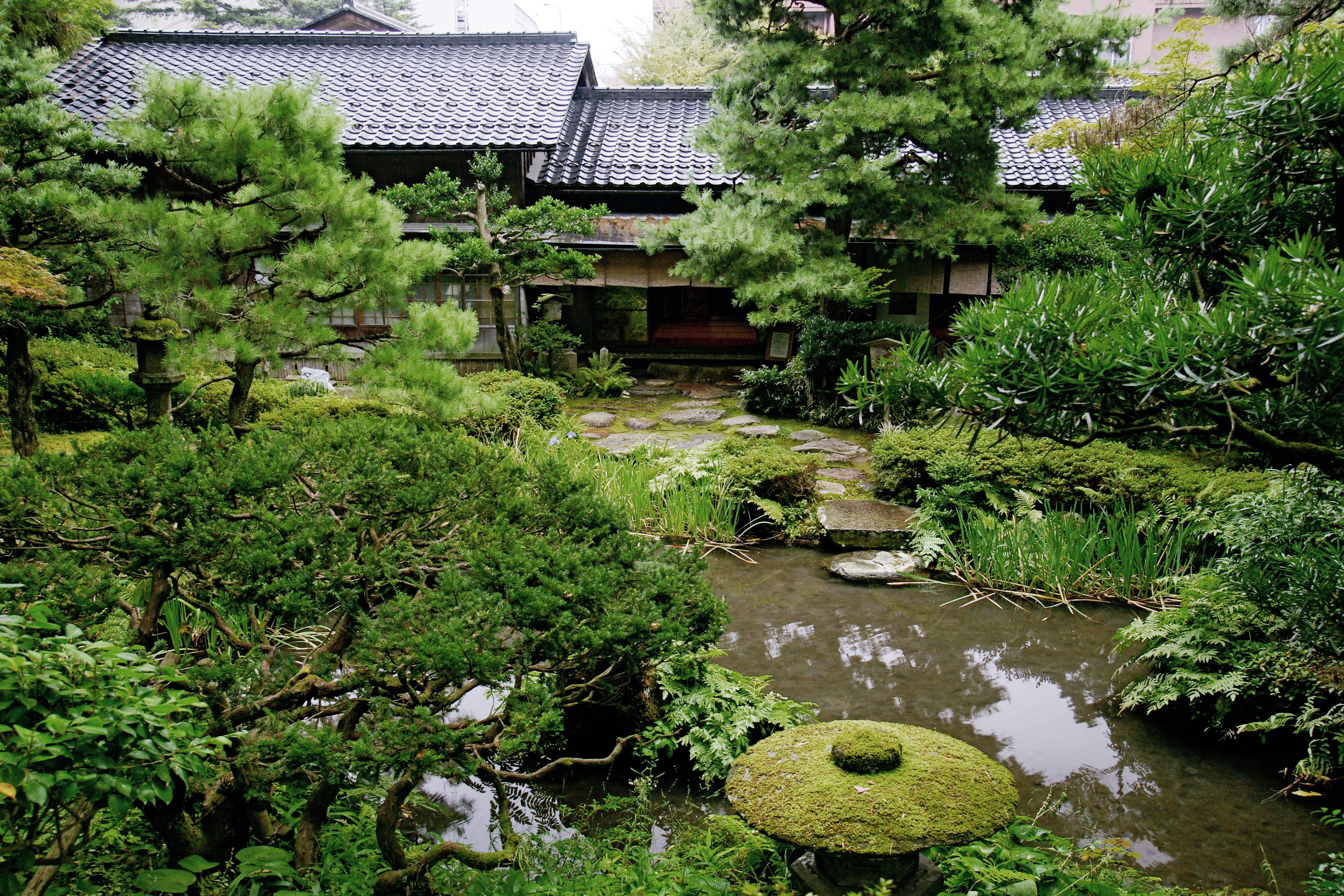
Gyokusen-en, the Japanese garden made by the Wakita clan

Naokata was given the name Kyūbei and served Toshinaga as a page, and he was given 230 koku. In 1605, he was adopted by the Wakita family (retainers of the Maeda clan) through the efforts of Eihime. He changed his name to Wakita Naokata. He performed distinguished services in the siege of Osaka and was given 1000 koku as reward. He was subsequently promoted in the Kaga domain, eventually becoming the Kanazawa machi bugyo (金沢町奉行) (commissioner of Kanazawa city).

Naokata was also one of the most prominent masters of Renga in Kaga and had thorough knowledge of The Tale of Genji and Kokin Wakashū.

Gyokusen-en, the Japanese garden in Kanazawa, was built by successive heads of the Wakita family and took the name from Naokata's benefactor Eihime, who became a Buddhist nun and took the name Gyokusen-in in 1614. In his later years, he chose to live a pabbajja life and changed his name to Jotetsu (如鉄), using the same Chinese characters of his original name.

== See also ==
- William Adams
- Jan Joosten van Lodensteijn
- List of foreign-born samurai in Japan
- Rinoie Motohiro
- Yagyū Shume
- Yasuke
