= Jan Joosten van Lodensteijn =

Dutch sailor who travelled to Japan (1556–1623)

Jan Joosten van Lodensteyn
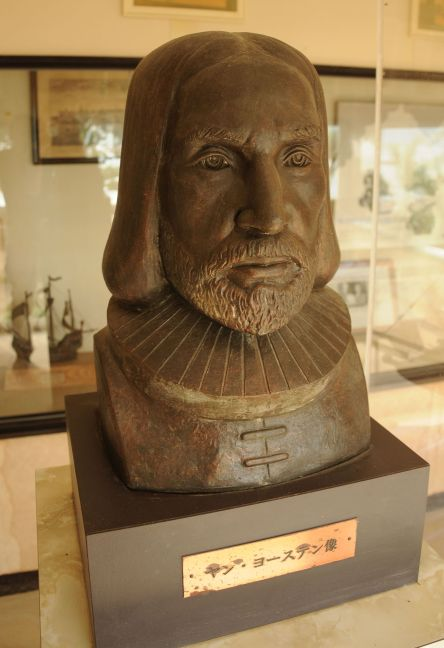
- Bust of Jan Joosten van Lodensteyn at the Kuroshima museum
- Born: 1556; Delft, Spanish Netherlands
- Died: 1623 (aged 67); South China Sea
- Other names: Yayōsu (耶楊子)
- Occupations: Merchant and sailor
- Known for: Among the first Dutchmen to travel to Japan; Among the first known Western Samurai

Jan Joosten van Lodensteyn (or Lodensteijn; 1556–1623), known in Japanese as Yayōsu (耶楊子), was a Dutch navigator and trader.

Jan Joosten was a native of Delft and one of the first Dutchmen in Japan, and the second mate on the Dutch ship De Liefde, which was stranded in Japan in 1600. He remained in Japan and served as a diplomatic advisor and interpreter to the Tokugawa shogunate on trade and economic matters. He was also engaged in the shuinsen (朱印船, lit. 'red seal ship') (Note: The shogunate-licensed trading ship.) trade in Asia.

The current name of the area around Tokyo Station in Japan, Yaesu, derives from his Japanese name Yayōsu.

== Life in Japan ==
Jan Joosten left Rotterdam in 1598 on board De Liefde (Note: the Love, sometimes translated as the Charity.) for a trading voyage in five ship expedition to the East Indies. The Liefde was piloted by Englishman William Adams (Note: He is said to have been the first Englishman to come to Japan.) as chief navigator. Other fellow sailors included the captain of De Liefde Jacob Quaeckernaeck and purser Melchior van Santvoort.

After making it through the Straits of Magellan, they became separated, but later rejoined the Hoop (Hope) off the coast of Chile, where some of the crew and captains of both vessels died in an encounter with natives. They decided to leave hostile Spanish waters and sell their woolen cloth cargo in Japan rather than in the warmer Moluccas. The two ships encountered a storm and Hoop was lost.

In April 1600, De Liefde drifted ashore at Usuki, Bungo Province, Japan. The crew was 110 when the ship departed from Rotterdam, but by the time it reached Japan it was down to 24, including several who were close to death. The Nagasaki bugyō in charge of the area seized weapons such as cannons, matchlock guns and ammunition on board the ship and reported this incident of foreigners drifting ashore (commonly known as the Liefde incident) to Toyotomi Hideyori in Osaka. The nineteen bronze cannons were unloaded from the ship and, according to Spanish accounts, later used at the decisive Battle of Sekigahara on 21 October 1600 (between Tokugawa forces and their rivals).

Tokugawa Ieyasu, the daimyō of Edo (modern Tokyo) who later became shōgun and established the Edo shogunate, dealt with the ship and its crew. Ieyasu, who was the head of the Council of Five Elders, ordered them to sail the ship to Sakai (near Osaka) and then on to Edo. It is known that the Portuguese Jesuit missionaries insisted to the Japanese that the ship was a pirate vessel and that the crew should be executed. (Note: The Jesuits came all the way to the Far East because Catholicism was becoming weaker in Europe due to the rise of Protestant powers such as the British and Dutch. Moreover, at the time, Queen Elizabeth I was openly supporting piracy in Britain, sinking enemy ships such as the Spanish and others, taking their cargoes and making a killing.) Some of them were received by Ieyasu, who questioned them at length on European politics, wars and foreign affairs. Adams and Jan Joosten told Ieyasu about the world situation, including that there were many conflicts in Europe, and that the Jesuits and other Catholics (e.g. Portuguese, Spanish), who had been proselytizing Christianity in Japan, and the Protestants (e.g. Dutch, English) were on different sides and were in conflict with each other. Ieyasu liked them for their frankness in telling the facts and recognized them as trustworthy. This is said to have influenced the foreign policy of the Tokugawa Shogunate and led to the exclusion of Portugal and Spain. This was because trade with Catholic countries was inseparable from the propagation of Christianity. The Protestant Netherlands, on the other hand, were allowed to continue their exchange as their only purpose was to trade with Japan. (Note: Perhaps anticipating subsequent colonialism, the Edo Shogunate excluded Britain, also Protestant, as well as the catholic countries.) The crew eventually went separate ways when some decided they should split the money provided as compensation for their losses of the ship and cargo.

Ieyasu invited both Adams and Jan Joosten to Edo when he became Shogun. He hired Adams as a diplomatic adviser and gave him the Japanese name Miura Anjin (三浦按針) and a fief of 220 koku in Miura, Sagami Province. Jan Joosten, also employed as a diplomatic adviser, was given the Japanese name Yayōsu (耶楊子) and a residence in Edo. The house was located on the edge of the inner moat outside the Wadakura Gate of Edo Castle. He then married a Japanese woman and had children. Although not allowed to return to the Netherlands, Jan Joosten was given a permit to engage in foreign trade. He was privileged to wear the two swords of the samurai and received an annual stipend which placed him (along with Adams) among the ranks of the hatamoto or direct retainers of the shōgun.

Jan Joosten served as Ieyasu's diplomatic adviser and interpreter, while at the same time engaging in the red seal ship trade under license from Tokugawa Ieyasu in Asia. When the Dutch trading house was established in Hirado, Nagasaki, in 1609, he was instrumental in developing trade between the shogunate and Dutch merchants and became a mediator between Japan and the Netherlands. He was reported by Dutch traders in Ayutthaya to be aboard junks carrying rich cargoes in early 1613. In a letter dated November 1614, Jan Joosten, as a trader, wrote: 'I report that the Emperor (Ieyasu) is to purchase all cannon and lead'.

Hoping to return to the Netherlands, he went to Batavia, the capital of the Dutch East Indies (now Jakarta, capital of Indonesia), but negotiations were proceeding with difficulty. As the Dutch authorities did not give him permission to sail, he gave up the idea of returning to the Netherlands. Then, on his way back to Japan, his ship ran aground in the South China Sea and he drowned in 1623.

== Memorials and legacy ==
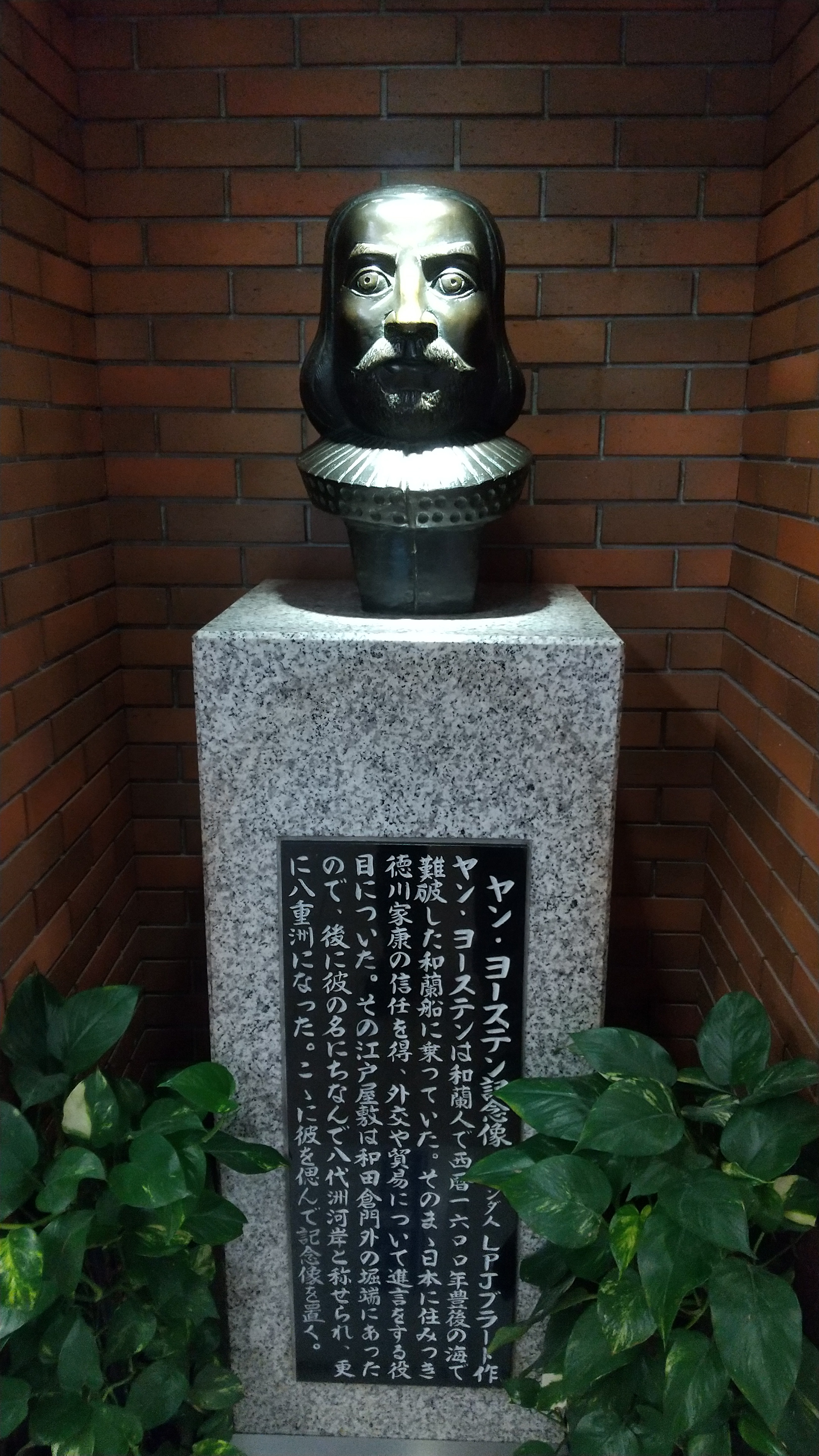
The Jan Josten Memorial Statue in the Yaesu Chikagai (Yaesu Underground Mall) in Tokyo Station.

The place name Yaesu in Tokyo comes from Jan Joosten. He lived in Edo Castle Town, near present-day Hibiya, Chiyoda-ku, so the place was called Yayosu (八代洲) after his Japanese name Yayōsu (耶楊子). Later, Yayosu (八代洲) changed to Yaesu (八重洲) and then used as the name of the town for the first time in 1872. The current Yaesu (八重洲) is located in Chuo-ku, Tokyo, and was established in 1954.

The Jan Joosten Memorial Statue stands in the Yaesu underground mall at Tokyo Station. The Jan Joosten Monument, erected in 1989 to commemorate the 380th anniversary of the Japan-Dutch Treaty of Amity, is located on Yaesu Street.

In 1999, his home town of Delft named Jan Joostenplein (Jan Joosten Square) after him (it is off Van Lodensteynstraat, which is named for a relative). There is a sculpture of "De Liefde" in the courtyard.

== See also ==
- William Adams
- Shōgun, a 1975 novel
- List of foreign-born samurai in Japan
- List of Westerners who visited Japan before 1868
- Sakoku
- Yasuke
- Wakita Naokata
- Rinoie Motohiro
- Yagyū Shume
