= Jean Crasset =

French Jesuit theologian

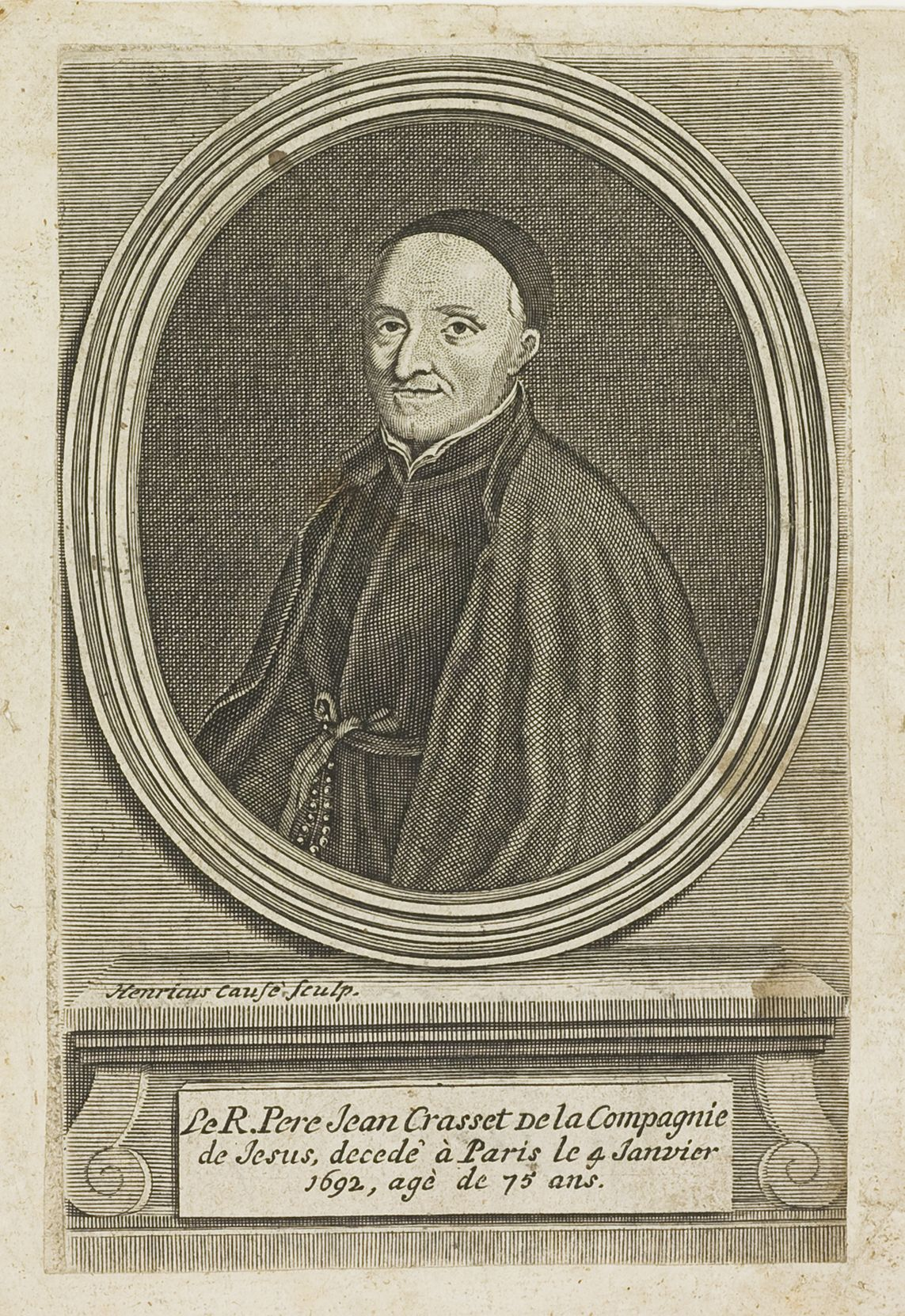
Jean Crasset

Jean Crasset (b. at Dieppe, France, 3 January 1618; d. at Paris, 4 January 1692) was a French Jesuit theologian, known as an ascetical writer.

== Life ==
He entered the Society of Jesus in 1638, and became professor of humanities and philosophy. He was director for twenty-three years of a famous sodality of men connected with the professed house of the Jesuits in Paris, and was also a successful preacher.

== Works ==
Crasset is the author of many ascetical works, among which are:

- Methode d'oraison;
- Considérationes chrétiennes pour tous les jours de l'année;
- La chrétienne in solitude;
- Dissertation sur les oracles des Sibylles, which was vigorously attacked;
- Entretiens pour la jeunesse (1685)

He also published in 1689 a Historie de l'eglise du japon which has been translated into several languages but which is considered inferior to that of Charlevoix. Crasset's history was unoriginal, for it was drawn in great part from the work which François Solier had issued in 1627; he retouched the style and continued the narrative from 1624 to 1658, but with crowded details. The author attributed the origin of the persecution of 1597 to the imprudence of the friars in making their religious ceremonies public.

There is a posthumous work of his entitled La foy victorieuse de l'infidélite et du libertinage. On 9 September 1656, the Bishop of Orléans issued an interdict against him for having in one of his sermons charged several ecclesiastics with sustaining the propositions condemned by the Bull of Pope Innocent X, Cum occasione (31 May 1653). The interdict was removed in the following February.

=== Other works ===
- The Devotion of Calvary, or, Meditations on the Passion of Our Lord and Saviour Jesus Christ (1844)
- The Secret of Sanctity (1893)
