= Thomas Lockley =

British academic (born 1978)

- Born: 1978 (age 47–48); United Kingdom
- Employer: Nihon University, School of Law
- Notable work: African Samurai: The True Story of Yasuke, a Legendary Black Warrior in Feudal Japan (2019)

Thomas Lockley (born 1978) is a British academic who is an associate professor of the College of Law of Nihon University. His research in the humanities and social sciences centres on education and history, with a particular emphasis on Japanese history.

== Profile ==
Lockley was born in the United Kingdom in 1978. He first came to Japan in 2000 as a participant in the JET Programme, spending two years in Tottori as an assistant language teacher at an elementary school. He later took on a full-time lecturing position at the Nihon University College of Law, and was promoted to associate professor in 2019 In the same year, he also became a visiting researcher for SOAS.

Lockley teaches history and English. His research focuses on education and history, with a particular emphasis on Japanese history from an International perspective.

== University publications ==
- The Story of Yasuke: Nobunaga's African Retainer (2016, Nihon University's journal Ōmon Ronsō (桜文論叢),)
- Nobunaga to Yasuke: Honnoji o ikinobita kokujinsamurai (信長と弥助 本能寺を生き延びた黒人侍) (2017)

== Bibliography ==
- — (2024). A Gentleman from Japan: The Untold Story of an Incredible Journey from Asia to Queen Elizabeth's Court. Hanover Square Press. p. 429. ISBN 9780369747990.
- — (2022). 英語で読む日本の歴史をつくった女性たち [Women Who Shaped Japanese History] (in Japanese). 東京書籍.
- — (2019). 英語で読む 外国人がほんとに知りたい日本の文化と歴史 [What Foreigners Really Want to Know About Japanese Culture and History] (in Japanese). 東京書籍. p. 306.
- —; Girard, Geoffrey (2019). African Samurai: The True Story of Yasuke, a Legendary Black Warrior in Feudal Japan. Little, Brown and Company. p. 390. ISBN 9781488098758.
- — (2017), 信長と弥助 本能寺を生き延びた黒人侍 [Nobunaga and Yasuke: The Black Samurai Who Survived the Honnoji Temple] (in Japanese), translated by Yoshiko Fuji, Ohta Publishing, ISBN 978-4-7783-1556-6
