= Siege of Namwon =

1597 Japan–Korea battle

- Part of Imjin War
Date	23 – 26 September 1597
Location	Namwon, North Jeolla 35°24′36″N 127°23′09″E
Result	Japanese victory

Belligerents
Japanese Left Army	Korean Garrison; Ming army

Commanders and leaders
Ukita Hideie; Hachisuka Iemasa; Ikoma Chikamasa; Konishi Yukinaga; Mori Yoshinari; Ōta Kazuyoshi; Takenaka Shigetoshi; Shimazu Yoshihiro; So Yoshitoshi; Tōdō Takatora; Wakisaka Yasuharu; Yoshiaki Katō	Korea: Yi Bok-nam †; Yi Chun-won; Yi Won Chun †; Kim Kyung-no †; Ma Ung-bang †; Wo Ung-jung †; Im Hyun †; Sin Ho †; Yi Dok-ho; Jong Sok-won; Jo Kyung-nam; Ming: Yang Yuan

Strength
50,000–68,000	Korea: 700–1,000; Ming: 3,000 men

Casualties and losses
6,500-7,000	3,726

- Siege of Namwon
- Hangul: 남원 전투
- Hanja: 南原戰鬪
- RR: Namwon jeontu
- MR: Namwŏn chŏnt'u

The siege of Namwon was a military engagement that occurred from 23 September to 26 September 1597. It ended in Japanese victory.

== Background ==
Ukita Hideie marched on Namwon with around 49,600 soldiers on 11 September 1597. They arrived on 23 September.

Namwon was garrisoned by 3,000 Ming soldiers and 1,000 Koreans under Yang Yuan and I Boknam.

== Battle ==
The Japanese began by sending 100 soldiers to test the fort's defenses.

On 24 September, the Japanese filled the trench with straw and earth. Then they took shelter in the burned out houses in the city.

On 25 September, the Japanese asked the defenders to surrender, but they refused.

On the night of 26 September, the Japanese bombarded Namwon for two hours while their men climbed the walls and used fresh straw to create a ramp to the top. Unable to burn the moist rice stalks, the defenders were helpless against the Japanese onslaught and the fortress fell.

== Aftermath ==
Yang Yuan managed to break the Japanese encirclement and escape with 100 men. He reached Jeonju only to find it deserted. The Ming commander assigned to the city's defense, Chen Youyuan, not only ignored the call for help Yang had sent him, but fled the moment news of Namwon's fall arrived. Yang continued to Hanseong and arrived the following week.

== Bibliography ==
- Alagappa, Muthiah (2003), Asian Security Order: Instrumental and Normative Features, Stanford University Press, ISBN 978-0-8047-4629-8
- Arano, Yasunori (2005), The Formation of a Japanocentric World Order, International Journal of Asian Studies
- Brown, Delmer M. (May 1948), "The Impact of Firearms on Japanese Warfare, 1543–1598", The Far Eastern Quarterly, 7 (3): 236–53, doi:10.2307/2048846, JSTOR 2048846, S2CID 162924328
- Eikenberry, Karl W. (1988), "The Imjin War", Military Review, 68 (2): 74–82
- Ha, Tae-hung; Sohn, Pow-key (1977), 'Nanjung Ilgi: War Diary of Admiral Yi Sun-sin, Yonsei University Press, ISBN 978-89-7141-018-9
- Haboush, JaHyun Kim (2016), The Great East Asian War and the Birth of the Korean Nation
- Hawley, Samuel (2005), The Imjin War, The Royal Asiatic Society, Korea Branch/UC Berkeley Press, ISBN 978-89-954424-2-5
- Jang, Pyun-soon (1998), Noon-eu-ro Bo-nen Han-gook-yauk-sa 5: Gor-yeo Si-dae (눈으로 보는 한국역사 5: 고려시대), Park Doo-ui, Bae Keum-ram, Yi Sang-mi, Kim Ho-hyun, Kim Pyung-sook, et al., Joog-ang Gyo-yook-yaun-goo-won. 1998-10-30. Seoul, Korea.
- Kim, Ki-chung (Fall 1999), "Resistance, Abduction, and Survival: The Documentary Literature of the Imjin War (1592–8)", Korean Culture, 20 (3): 20–29
- Kim, Yung-sik (1998), "Problems and Possibilities in the Study of the History of Korean Science", Osiris, 2nd Series, 13: 48–79, doi:10.1086/649280, JSTOR 301878, S2CID 143724260
- 桑田忠親 [Kuwata, Tadachika], ed., 舊參謀本部編纂, [Kyu Sanbo Honbu], 朝鮮の役 [Chousen no Eki] (日本の戰史 [Nihon no Senshi] Vol. 5), 1965.
- Neves, Jaime Ramalhete (1994), "The Portuguese in the Im-Jim War?", Review of Culture, 18: 20–24
- Niderost, Eric (June 2001), "Turtleboat Destiny: The Imjin War and Yi Sun Shin", Military Heritage, 2 (6): 50–59, 89
- Niderost, Eric (January 2002), "The Miracle at Myongnyang, 1597", Osprey Military Journal, 4 (1): 44–50
- Park, Yune-hee (1973), Admiral Yi Sun-shin and His Turtleboat Armada: A Comprehensive Account of the Resistance of Korea to the 16th Century Japanese Invasion, Shinsaeng Press
- Rockstein, Edward D. (1993), Strategic And Operational Aspects of Japan's Invasions of Korea 1592–1598 1993-6-18, Naval War College
- Sadler, A. L. (June 1937), "The Naval Campaign in the Korean War of Hideyoshi (1592–1598)", Transactions of the Asiatic Society of Japan, Second Series, 14: 179–208
- Sansom, George (1961), A History of Japan 1334–1615, Stanford University Press, ISBN 978-0-8047-0525-7
- Sohn, Pow-key (April–June 1959), "Early Korean Painting", Journal of the American Oriental Society, 79 (2): 96–103, doi:10.2307/595851, JSTOR 595851
- Stramigioli, Giuliana (December 1954), "Hideyoshi's Expansionist Policy on the Asiatic Mainland", Transactions of the Asiatic Society of Japan, Third Series, 3: 74–116
- Strauss, Barry (Summer 2005), "Korea's Legendary Admiral", MHQ: The Quarterly Journal of Military History, 17 (4): 52–61
- Swope, Kenneth M. (2006), "Beyond Turtleboats: Siege Accounts from Hideyoshi's Second Invasion of Korea, 1597–1598", Sungkyun Journal of East Asian Studies, 6 (2): 177–206
- Swope, Kenneth M. (2005), "Crouching Tigers, Secret Weapons: Military Technology Employed During the Sino-Japanese-Korean War, 1592–1598", The Journal of Military History, 69: 11–42, doi:10.1353/jmh.2005.0059, S2CID 159829515
- Swope, Kenneth M. (December 2002), "Deceit, Disguise, and Dependence: China, Japan, and the Future of the Tributary System, 1592–1596", The International History Review, 24 (4): 757–1008, doi:10.1080/07075332.2002.9640980, S2CID 154827808
- Swope, Kenneth M. (2009), A Dragon's Head and a Serpent's Tail: Ming China and the First Great East Asian War, 1592–1598, University of Oklahoma Press
- Turnbull, Stephen (2002), Samurai Invasion: Japan's Korean War 1592–98, Cassell & Co, ISBN 978-0-304-35948-6
- Turnbull, Stephen (2008), The Samurai Invasion of Korea 1592-98, Osprey Publishing Ltd
- Turnbull, Stephen (1998), The Samurai Sourcebook, Cassell & Co, ISBN 978-1-85409-523-7
- Villiers, John (1980), SILK and Silver: Macau, Manila and Trade in the China Seas in the Sixteenth Century (A lecture delivered to the Hong Kong Branch of the Royal Asiatic Society at the Hong Kong Club. 10 June 1980). The HKUL Digital Initiatives
- Yi, Min-woong (2004), Imjin Wae-ran Haejeonsa: The Naval Battles of the Imjin War [임진왜란 해전사], Chongoram Media [청어람미디어], ISBN 978-89-89722-49-6
