= François Solier =

French Jesuit and preacher (1558–1628)

- Born: 1558; Brive, Corrèze, France
- Died: 16 October 1628 (aged 69–70); Saint-Macaire, Gironde, France
- Occupations: Jesuit priest, teacher, preacher, historian
- Known for: Founder and first rectory of the Collège de Limoges

François Solier (1558 – 16 October 1628) was a French Jesuit, head of the college of Limoges, preacher, translator of spiritual works into French and author of historical books.

== Biography ==
François Solier was born in Brive in 1558. He entered the Society of Jesus on 20 August 1577 and took his novitiate in Bordeaux. At the end of his spiritual and academic training he was ordained a priest in Paris in 1589. Before his ordination he had already taught as a "regent" (Note: Under the Ancien Régime, a regent was someone who taught in a college before becoming a priest.) at the College of Pont-à-Mousson (1578–1580) and in other educational establishments run by the Jesuits. From 1591 to 1596 Father Solier was master of novices in Verdun. In 1597 he was appointed to Limoges.

=== Head of the Collège of Limoges ===
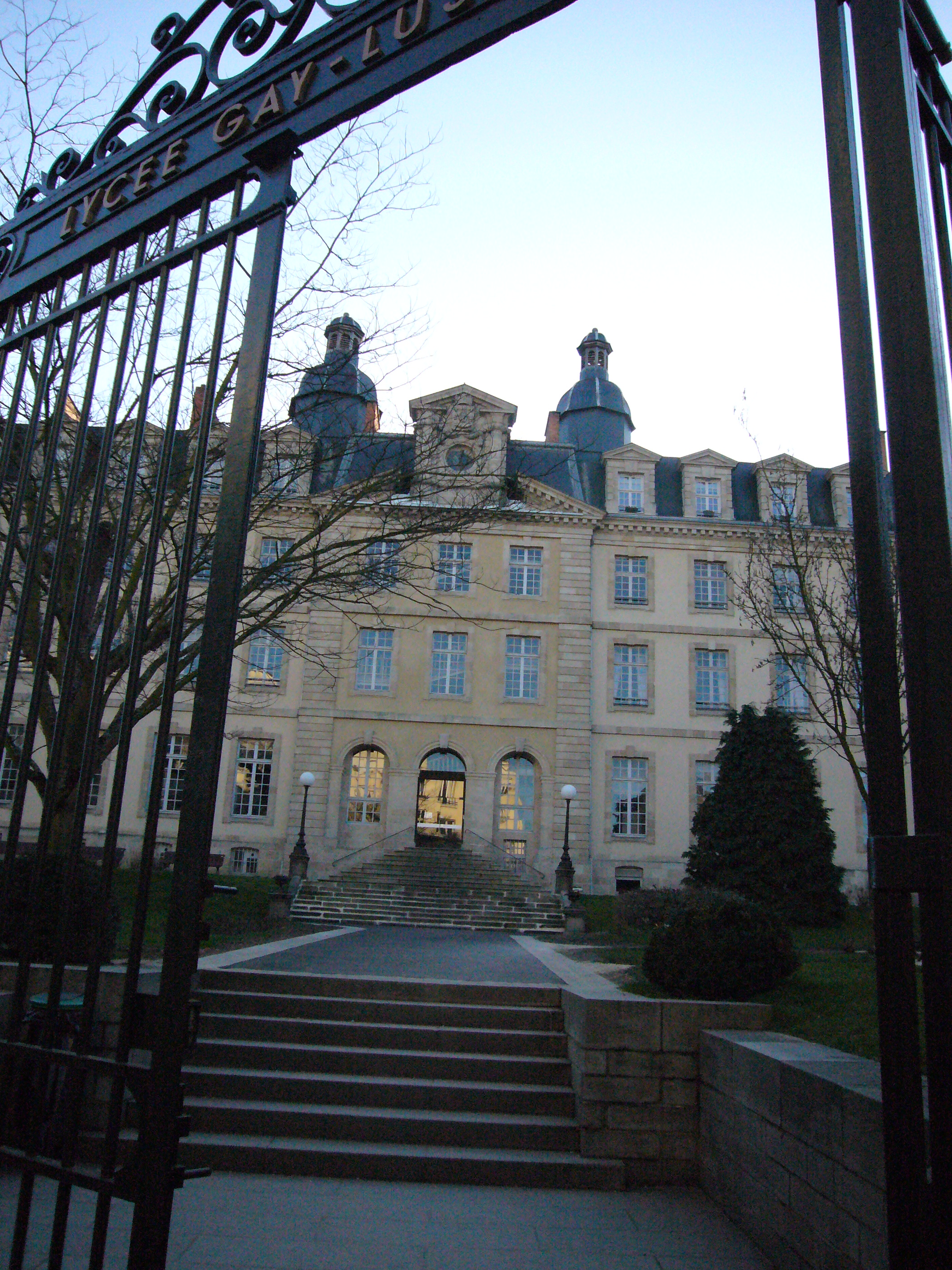
The Lycée Gay-Lussac (Limoges). Solier was the first rector when the college was entrusted to the Jesuits in 1598

Father Solier was the first Jesuit rector (Note: The rector is the head of a religious educational establishment, and among the Jesuits is one who directs a classical college for boys.) at the College of Limoges when the management of the College of Limoges was entrusted to the Jesuits in 1598. He held this position from August 1598 until 1603. He again became rector of the College of Limoges from 1606 to 1608.

While Solier was negotiating for the institution to be officially entrusted to the Jesuits, while already being its de facto rector, the Jesuit drama Absalom was performed at the college in July 1599. (Note: Perhaps Absalom was like Saint Jacques, written by Bernard Bardon de Brun (1564–1625), performed in public in Limoges, in 1596.) Performed by colleges students, the crowd of spectators was considerable, and the bishop attended the performance with his clergy, consuls, and senior figures of all orders.

We find an illustration of the way in which the function of rector could be lived at that time, and also of what could be the experience of the college students of Limoges, from the description of a religious procession which took place in Limoges in 1610, a few years after François Solier had exercised the functions of rector. As Pierre Delage reports, the Jesuits had recently settled in Limoges in the years 1600–1610, and they were keen to revive the Catholic faith in the city. To this end, they organized processions, in which the students of the boys' college participated, such as the one that took place in 1610, of which here is a description:

On Dimanche Gras 20 February, the pupils of fifth form, numbering 114, representing the celestial hierarchies and carrying the mysteries of the passion, roamed the city; then it was the turn of the 104 pupils of the fourth grade, dressed as virgins, all in white crew; the next day, the 100 pupils of the third year representing the sibyls and the martyred virgins; then the 60 members of the Congregation dressed as penitents (note: they had their own chapel in the school building on rue du college); the 60 pupils of the second, representing the fathers of the old law, patriarchs, kings, prophets; the 40 pupils of the first class, Rhetoric, representing the apostles, the evangelists, the doctors (…). A general procession crowned these solemnities.

We see here that the sixth grade class, as well as the philosophy class, have not yet been created, and that without these two classes the total number of pupils is 418 college students, while the teachers number seven fathers in 1610, and will number thirty-two in 1622.

=== Theologian and translator ===
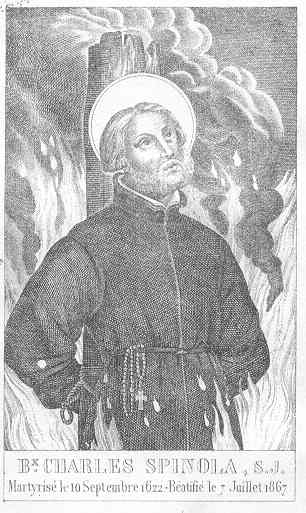
Old engraving of Charles Spinola, Italian Jesuit, whose death in Nagasaki, Japan, in 1622, is reported in a work by François Solier

François Solier is known for having participated in a religious controversy when he translated into French, in 1611, three Spanish sermons which had been delivered during the beatification of Ignatius of Loyola, founder of the Company of Jesus, by the Fathers Pierre de Valderame, Pierre Deza, Jacques Rebullosa. The theological faculty of Paris condemned propositions contained in these texts as "impious, execrable, detestable, false and manifestly heretical". The Jesuits, through François Solier, responded in 1611 with a letter in which he accused the College of Sorbonne of being more severe than the Inquisition of Spain and of being in touch with the Protestants.

François Solier published many translations from Latin, Spanish and Italian of works of a religious nature, as well as books on subjects of a religious nature.

=== Historian ===
A remarkable work by François Solier is a book of a historical nature that deals with the life of the Catholic Church in Japan at the turn of the sixteenth and seventeenth centuries. In this work, "Ecclesiastical History of the Islands and Kingdom of Japan, collected by Father François Solier", François Solier reports the events which saw Catholics, clerics, or laity, undergo religious persecution, and, for some, such as the Italian Jesuit Charles Spinola, to be put to death in Japan at the beginning of the seventeenth century for having practiced Catholic worship. Here is how François Solier relates events of religious persecutions in Japan in 1622, in a style that accurately reflects these very dark facts which were reported to the author by witnesses present in Japan during these years of religious persecution,

Twenty-six (Christians) left the jail of Omura, in which they had languished for a long time, some more, some less, and all so cramped, that in a single lower room, equipped only with twelve small rooms. mat; they were sometimes thirty prisoners and more, having for three a mat of eight spans (note: about 1.60 m) long, and three (note: about 0.60 m) wide, on which they were day and night, without being able to take a step out of it. Or even being forced to dump their own garbage there; inconvenience sufficient to make them die in a few days. Their food was a bowl of all-black rice, with some stinking sardines, and sometimes soup cooked with turnip leaves. For the jailers did not feed them root meals.

While Omura's prisoners were taken to Nagasaki, the governor of the place had thirty of them presented, both men and women, held in his prisons, which he examined, and condemned them to lose their heads. They left the tribunal of this iniquitous Judge, with great joy, almost all carrying either cross or crucifix in hand. One of the Ladies, as leader of the others, arranged them both together, and walked first, with the banner of the crucifix in hand. The others followed her as in a procession, singing the praises of God, in detestation of idols. Some carried their children in their arms, to offer them to God with them. The men closed the procession, the most pleasant that had ever been seen in Japan.

=== Death ===
François Solier died on October 16, 1638, in Saint-Macaire, Gironde. He has always been held in great esteem by his order. Tireless at work, he found the time, while taking care to run the school for which he was in charge perfectly, to publish quite a number of works.

== Writings ==
- François Solier (1598), Traité de la mortification, Paris
- François Solier (1599), La vie du P. Jacques Lainez, Paris
- Le Martyrologe romain distribué pour tous les jours de l'année suivant la nouvelle réforme du calendrier, translated by François Solier, Limoges: H. Barbou, 1599
- Pierre de Ribadenere (1600), Traité de la tribulation fait en espagnol, translated by François Solier, Paris: G. Chaudière
- François Solier, Manuel des exercices spirituels, Paris, 1601
- Luca Pinelli, La Perfection religieuse, translated by François Solier, Limoges, 1603
- François Arias (1606), Traité de l'Oraison mentale, ou Méditation des mystères de la vie et passion de notre Sauveur Jésus-Christ, translated by François Solier, Rouen: L'Oyselet
- Pierre de Ribadenere (1609), La Vie du R. P. François de Borgia, translated by François Solier, Lyon
- François Solier, La Science des Saints, Paris, 1609
- François Arias (1611), Traité de l'Imitation de Notre Dame la glorieuse Vierge Marie, mère de Dieu, translated by François Solier, Douai: Impr. de B. Bellere
- Pierre de Valderame, Pierre Deza, Jacques Rebullosa (1611), Trois très excellentes prédications prononcées au jour et fête de la béatification du glorieux patriarche le Bienheureux Ignace, fondateur de la Compagnie de Jésus, translated by François Solier, Poitiers: A. Mesnier
- François Solier (1611), Lettre justificative du P. François Solier répondant à un sien ami touchant la censure de quelques sermons faits en Espagne à l'honneur du bienheureux Père Ignace de Loyola, fondateur de la Compagnie de Jésus, Poitiers: A. Mesnier
- Francesco Albertini (1613), Traité de l'ange gardien, translated by François Solier, Poitiers
- Sébastien Vieira (1618), Lettre annuelle du Japon de l'an mil six cent treize, translated by François Solier, Paris
- Giovanni Agostino Confalonieri (1625), Traité excellent de la célébration de la sainte messe, translated by François Solier, Paris
- François Solier (1627–1629), Histoire ecclésiastique des îles et royaume du Japon, recueillie par le P. François Solier, Paris: S. Cramoisy

== Sources ==
- Arbellot, François (1887), Le Père Solier, de Brive (in French), Tulle: Impr. de Crauffon
- Delage, Pierre (2010), Lycée Gay-Lussac: 5 siècles d'enseignement (in French), Saint-Paul: Le Puy Fraud éd.
- Fouqueray, Henri (1910–1925), Histoire de la Compagnie de Jésus en France, des origines à la suppression (1528–1762) (in French), Paris: A. Picard et fils, Firmin-Didot
- Hoefer, Jean Chrétien Ferdinand (1852), Nouvelle biographie universelle depuis les temps les plus reculés jusqu'à nos jours (in French), Paris: Firmin-Didot frères
- Michaud, Louis-Gabriel (1870), Biographie universelle, ancienne et moderne (in French), Paris: C. Delagrave
