= Yi Pongnam =

Korean naval commander (1555–1597)

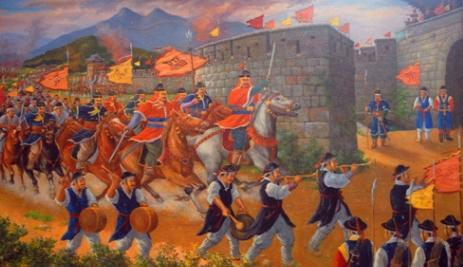
- Yi Pongnam (middle)
- Born: June 28, 1555; Gangneung, Kangwon Province, Joseon
- Died: August 16, 1597 (aged 42)
- Occupation: Naval commander

Korean name
- Hangul: 이복남
- Hanja: 李福男
- RR: I Boknam
- MR: I Pongnam

Courtesy name
- Hangul: 수보
- Hanja: 綏甫
- RR: Subo
- MR: Subo

Posthumous name
- Hangul: 충장
- Hanja: 忠壯
- RR: Chungjang
- MR: Ch'ungjang

Yi Pongnam (Korean: 이복남; Hanja: 李福男; June 28, 1555 – August 16, 1597) was a Korean naval commander and politician of the Joseon period. He passed the military examination and attained the position of Byeongmajeoldosa (병마절도사; 兵馬節度使) for Jeolla Province. He served against the Japanese navy during the Imjin war. His courtesy name was Subo (수보; 綏甫).

== Life ==
In 1588, Yi passed the military examination (무과; 武科).

He is famed for his victories at the Battle of Woongchi and Ahndeokwon in 1592. He was killed on April 18, 1597, at the Siege of Namwon, aged 43.

The royal court eventually bestowed various honors upon him, including a posthumous title of Chungjanggong (충장공, 忠壯公, Loyal Duke of brave), an enrollment as a Seonmu Wonjong Gongsin (선무원종공신; 宣武原從功臣), and two posthumous offices, Jwachanseong (좌찬성, 左讚成, Left Vice Prime Minister).

== See also ==
- Imjin war
- Yi Sun-sin
- Yi Gwang-sik
