= Suzuri-bako =

Type of Japanese writing implement box

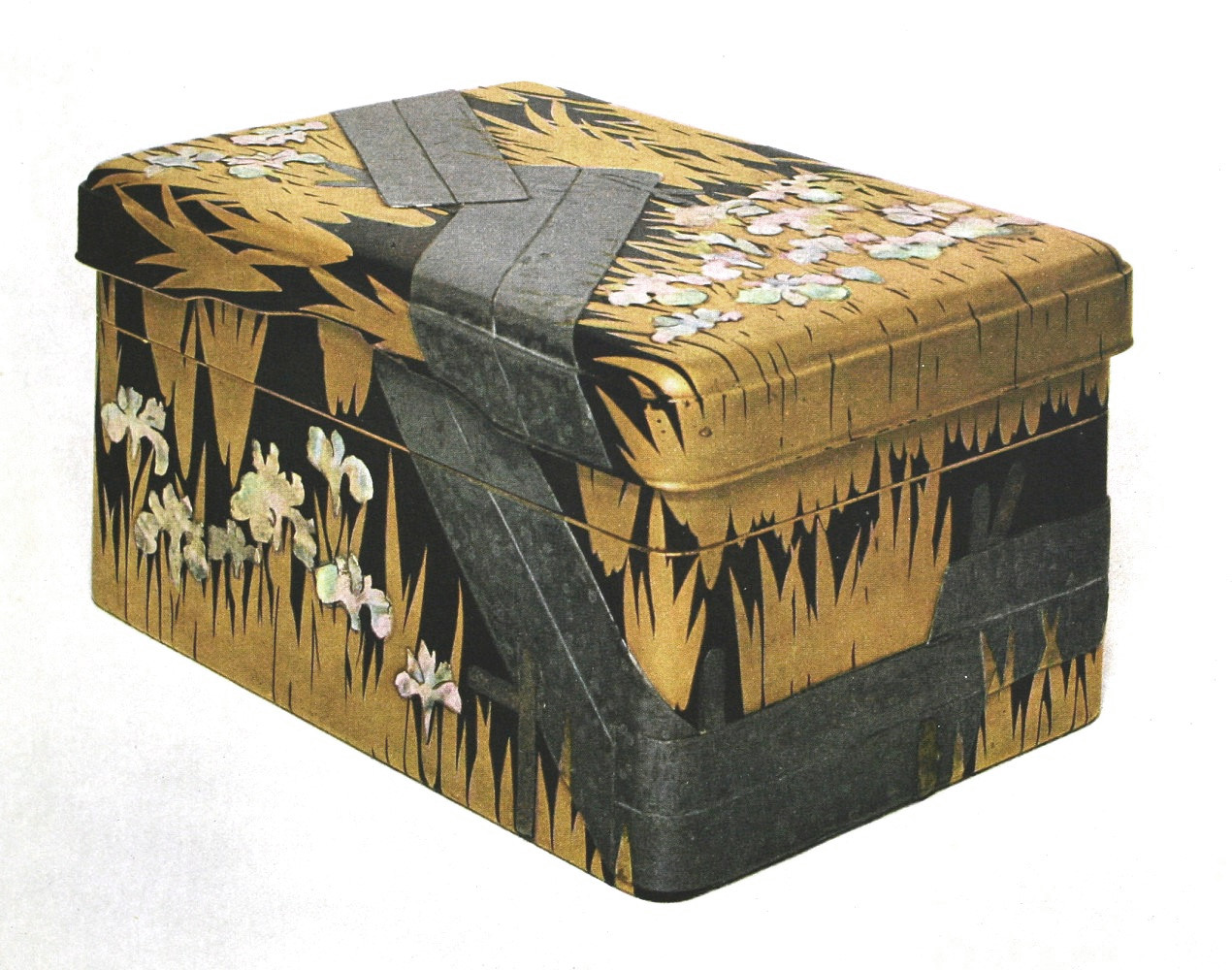
A larger Edo period suzuri-bako depicting eight bridges and iris, lacquerware and mother-of-pearl, attributed to Ogata Kōrin (National Treasure)

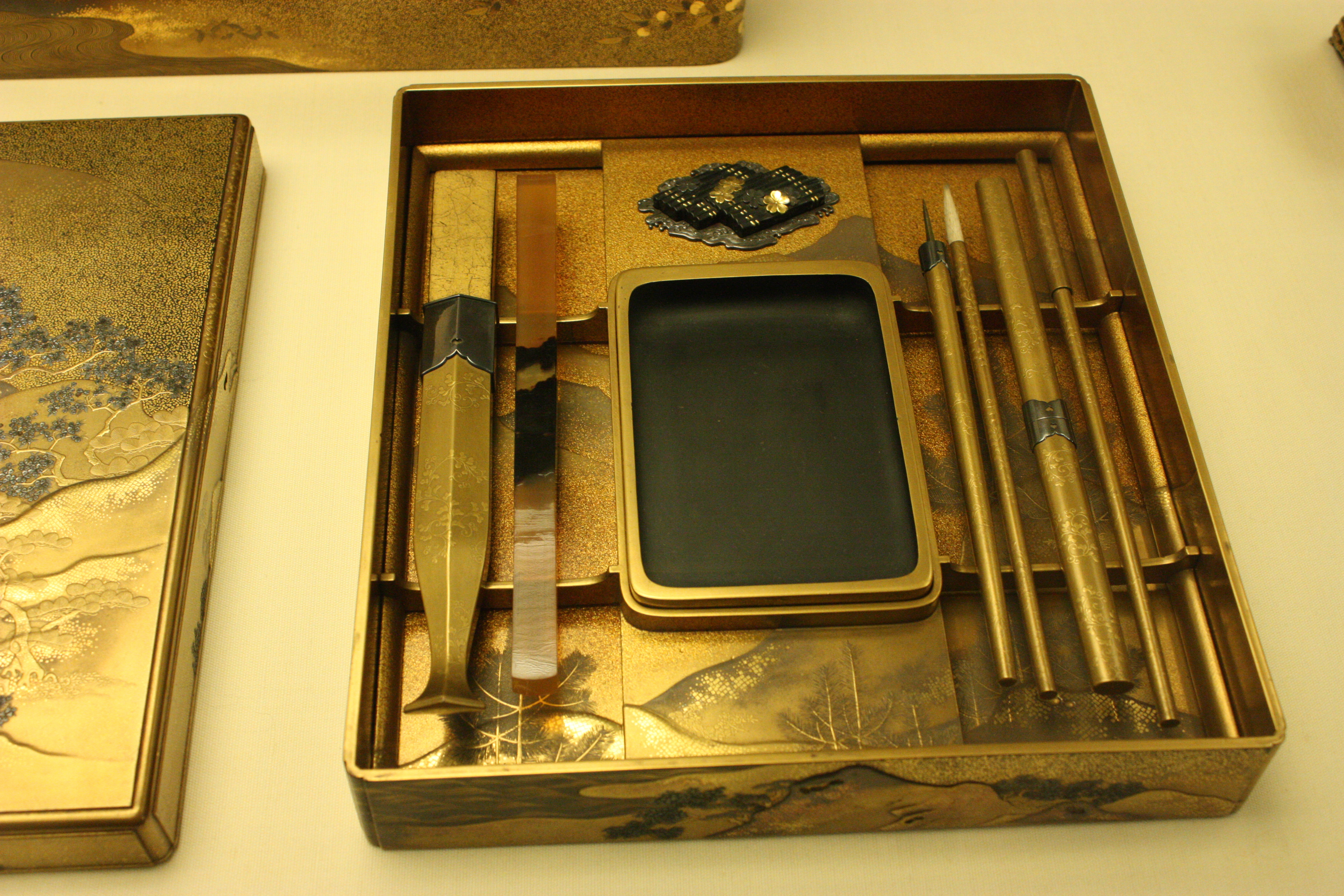
Open box with writing implements inside such as brushes, inkstone, water container, and knife

Suzuri-bako (硯箱; "inkstone box") are a type of Japanese writing box. The boxes are traditionally made of lacquered wood and are used to hold writing implements. Historically, the boxes were associated with calligraphy, and as such they were made using high-quality materials designed to safeguard porcelain inkstones (suzuri) from damage.

== History ==
The first suzuri-bako were developed in 9th-century Japan. At the time, calligraphy was an integral part of Japanese society. In order for a writer to produce a high-quality calligraphy script, a set of precise tools was needed. The most important of these tools was the inkstone, which was required to hold and transfer ink onto a writer's brush. Ink sticks, water droppers, and a small knife were also part of a calligrapher's set. Suzuri-bako were designed to ensure that the various tools a calligrapher needed were properly organized and protected. Due to the insoluble nature of resin-based lacquer, the contents of the writing box were relatively safe from moisture. Inside of the square or rectangular boxes rested a number of different trays and holders, the layout of which differed from period to period. Early boxes were large enough to accommodate both the writer's implements and papers, while later boxes only housed tools. A second type of box, the ryōshibako, were used in later periods to house completed papers.

Suzuri-bako became more elaborate as over time. While early period boxes are often decorated with solid red lacquer, more modern boxes are decorated in any number of ways. From the Muromachi period onward, many writing boxes have been decorated with images from Japan's great works of literature. Kōdaiji Temple in Kyoto became associated with a style of Suzuri-bako decoration that featured asymmetrical patterns and autumn grasses. In terms of lacquerware, black, brown, and gold are the most common colors seen in more modern suzuri-bako. During the Edo period many dowries included a suzuri-bako. Advancements in technology and manufacturing processes during the Meiji period resulted in a development of a number of new box shapes and sizes. The craft declined after the wide scale replacement of calligraphy, though the boxes are still produced in small numbers.

== Gallery ==
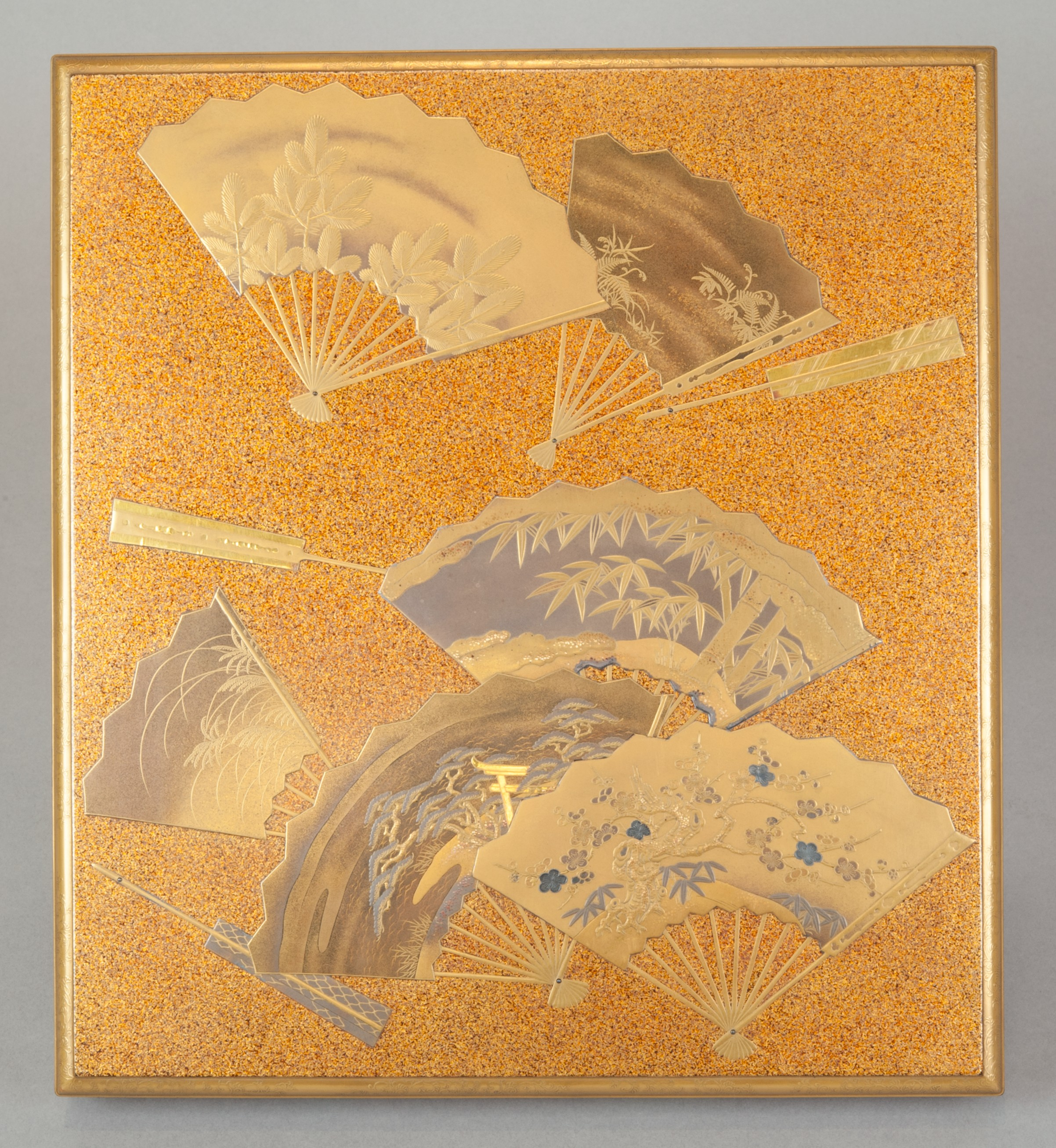
17th century suzuri-bako depicting fans, made in wood with silver-gold lacquer

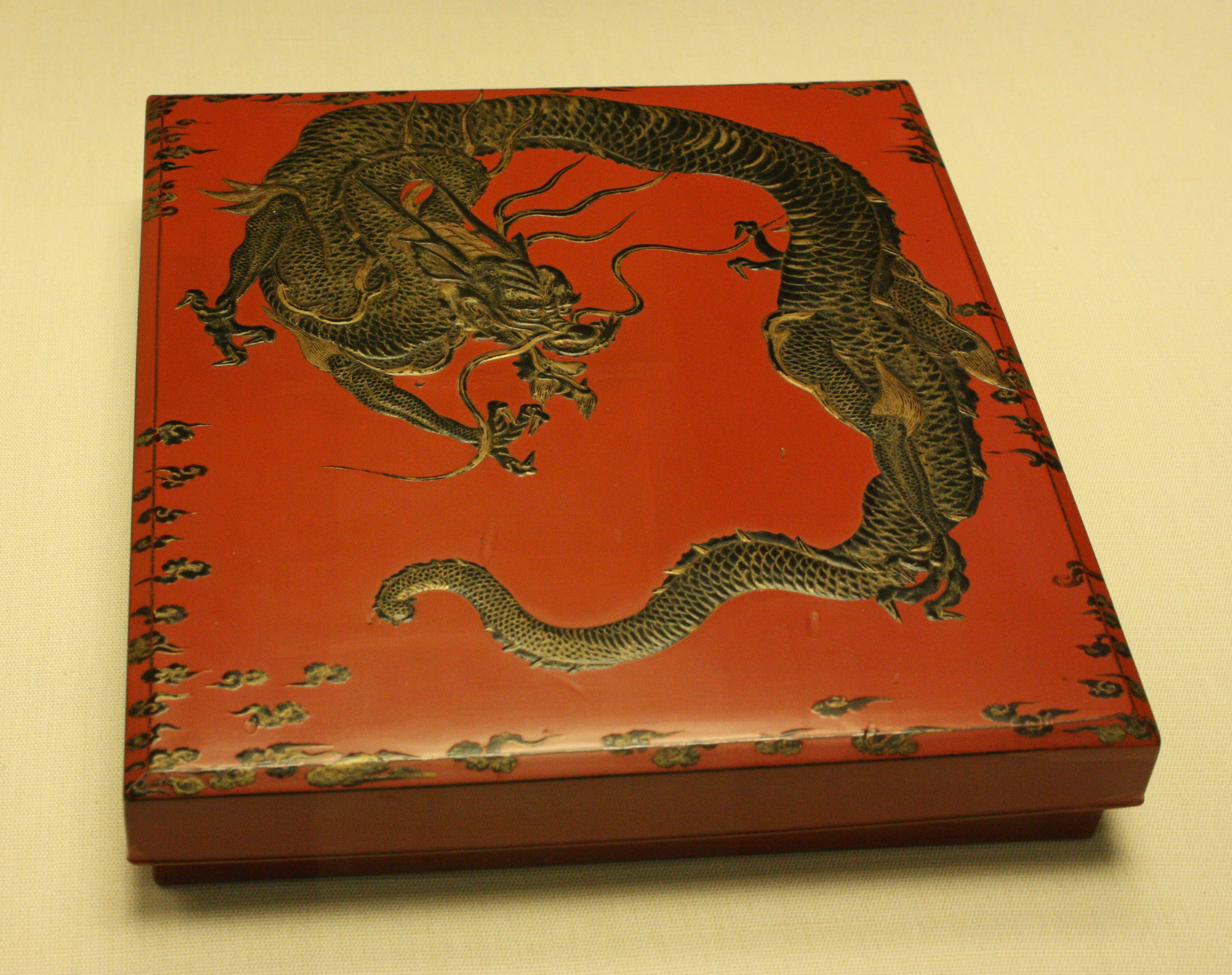
17th-century suzuri-bako depicting a dragon

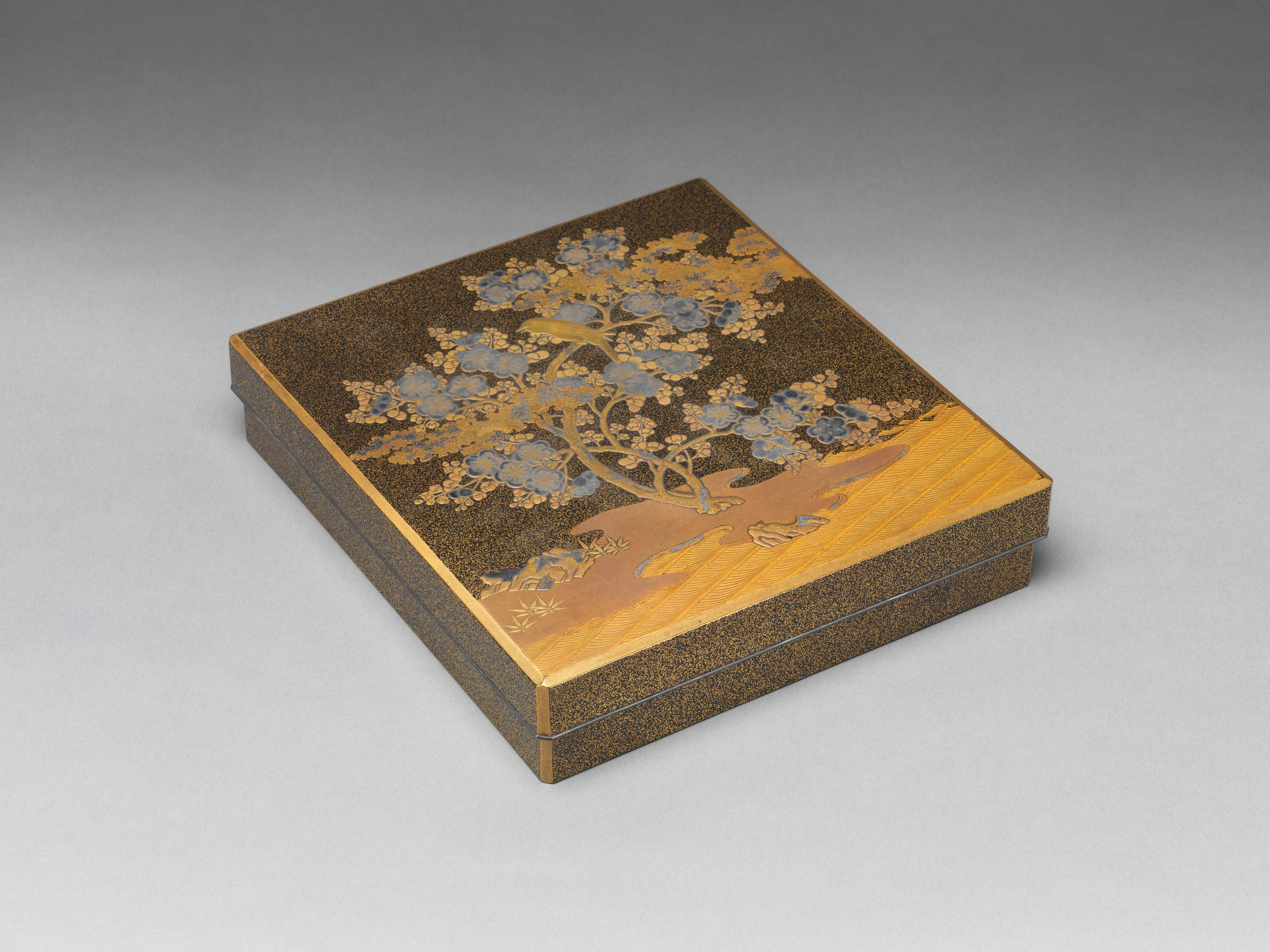
Edo period 18th-century suzuri-bako depicting a warbler in a plum tree, made in lacquered wood with gold and silver inlay

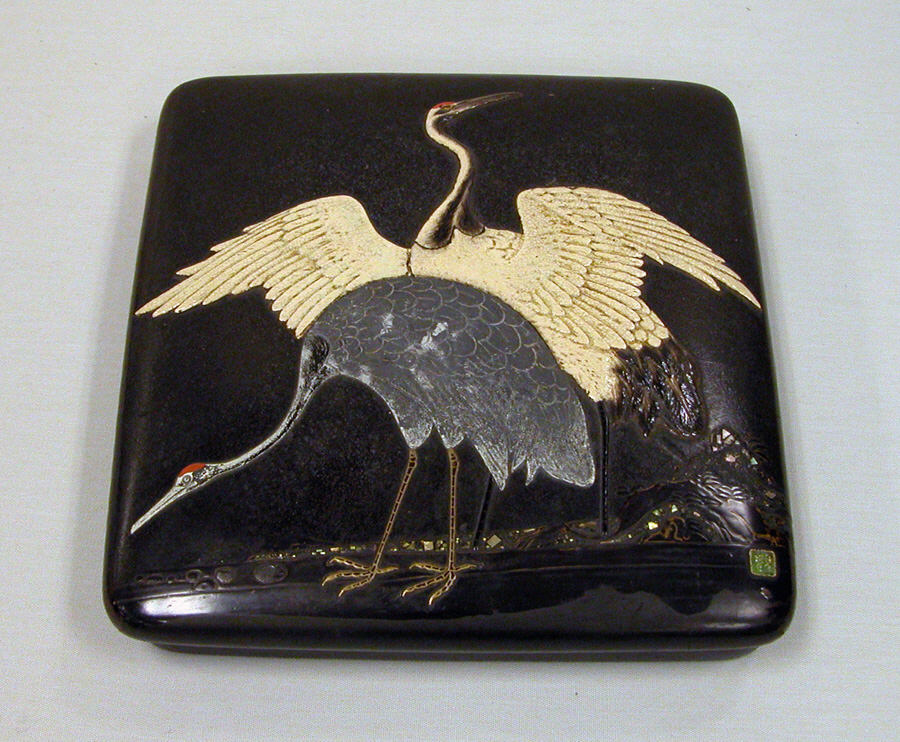
18th-century suzuri-bako with cranes

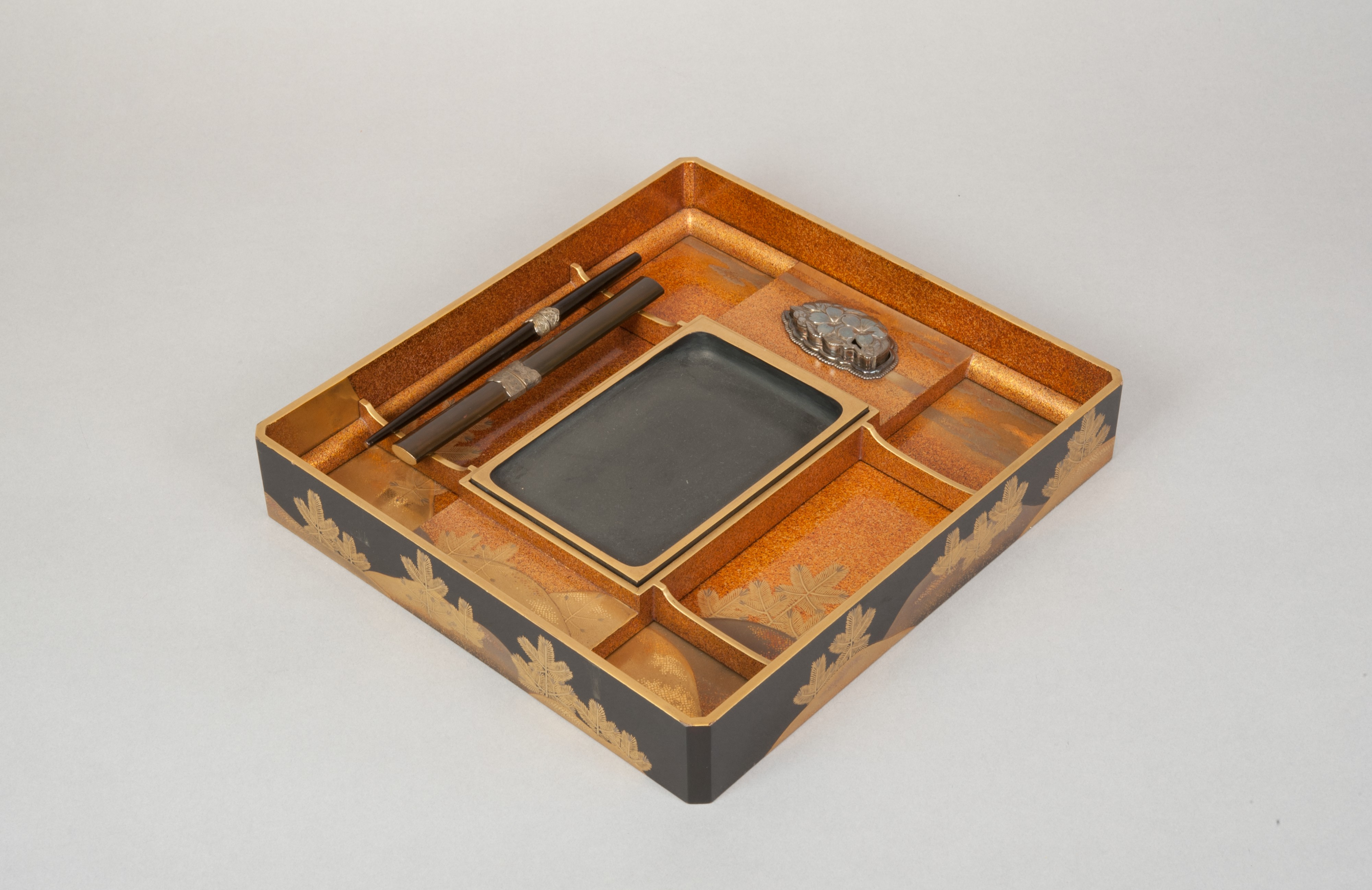
19th-century suzuri-bako with interior compartments displayed

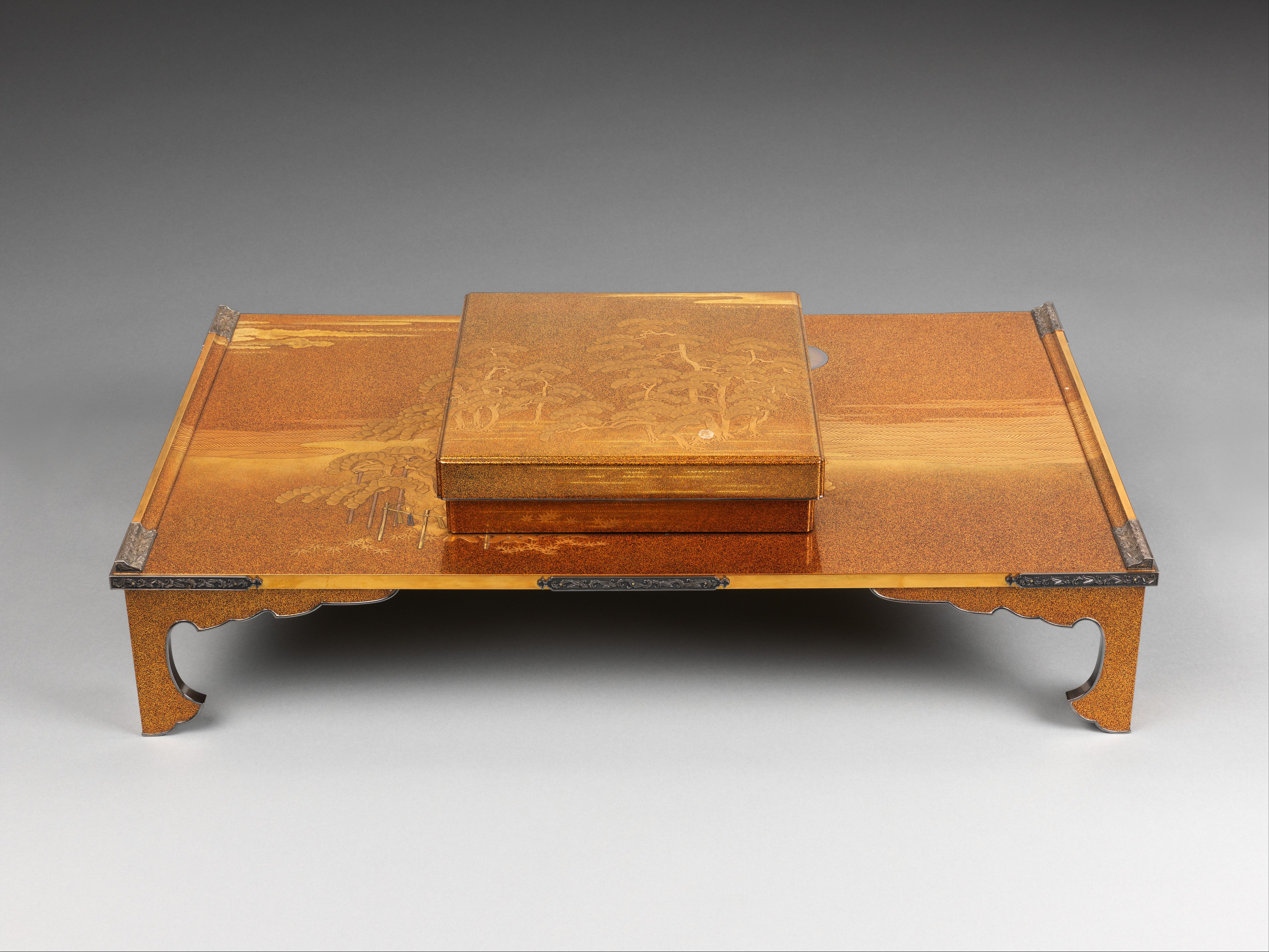
Early-20th century suzuri-bako paired with a writing table
