= Linschoten-Vereeniging =

Scholarly society in the Netherlands

The Linschoten-Vereeniging (Linschoten Society) is a Dutch scholarly society dedicated to publishing rare or previously unpublished travel accounts and geographical descriptions. It was founded in 1908 by Jan Willem IJzerman and Gerret Pieter Rouffaer, by a group of historians and former seafarers regarded as specialists in Dutch maritime history.

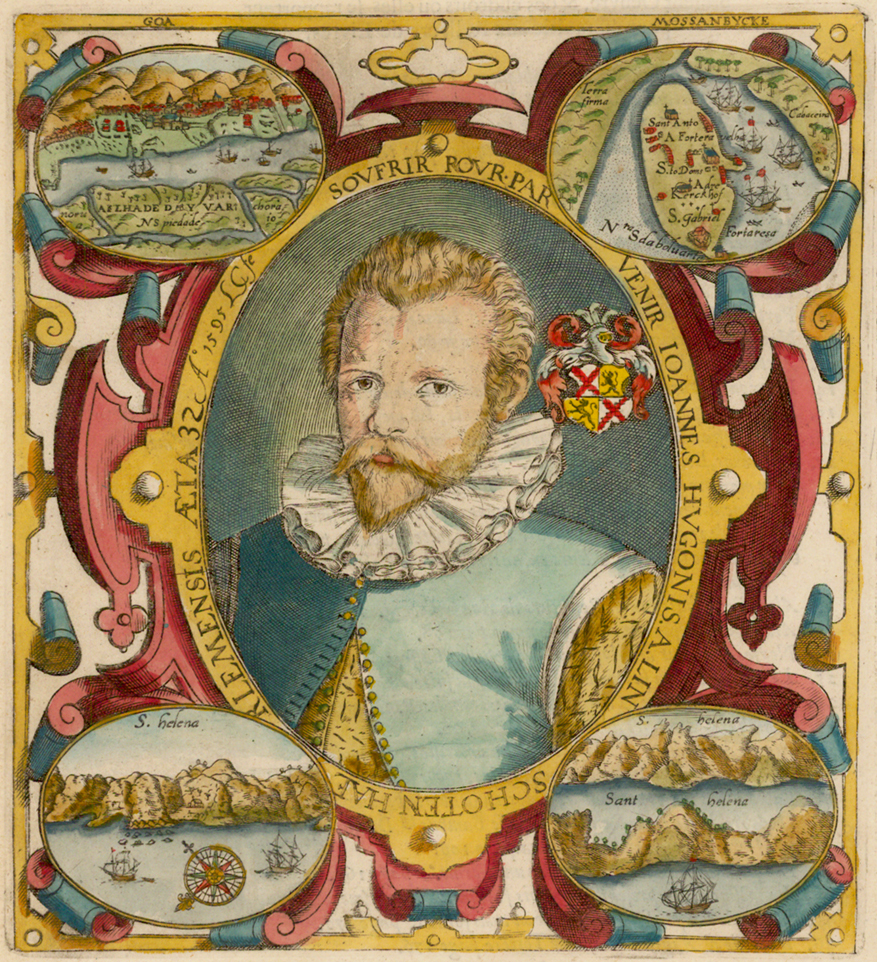
Jan Huygen van Linschoten (c. 1563–1611)

The society is named after the Dutch merchant, writer, and explorer Jan Huygen van Linschoten (c. 1563–1611), whose works at the end of the 16th century provided merchants from Holland and Zeeland with essential information for navigating the trade routes to the East Indies. The primary aim of the society—comparable to that of the Hakluyt Society—is to promote knowledge of the history of travel and navigation through scholarly editions of contemporary travel narratives. For more than a century, the society has published critical editions of maritime and travel accounts. Over one hundred volumes have appeared to date, and a substantial number of the earlier editions have been digitised.

The best-known publication series of the Linschoten-Vereeniging is the Werken van de Linschoten-Vereeniging (Works of the Linschoten Society). From 1909 to 1981 (vols. 1–83) the series was published by Martinus Nijhoff in The Hague. Additional publications include the Registers (index volumes) and the Gelegenheidsuitgaven (occasional publications).

== Overview of publications ==
=== Werken van de Linschoten-Vereeniging ===
(with roughly translated additionally English titles)

- 1 De reis van Jan Cornelisz. May naar de IJszee en de Amerikaanse kust, 1611-1612. Onder redactie van S. Muller Fz. 1909. lvi, 226 p.

[The Voyage of Jan Cornelisz. May to the Ice Sea and the American Coast, 1611–1612]

- 2. [1] Itinerario. Voyage ofte schipvaert van Jan Huygen van Linschoten naer Oost ofte Portugaels Indiën, 1579-1592. Deel 1. Onder redactie van H. Kern. 1910. xxxix, 238 p.
  2. [2] Itinerario. Voyage ofte schipvaert van Jan Huygen van Linschoten naer Oost ofte Portugaels Indiën, 1579-1592. Deel 2. Onder redactie van H. Kern. 1910. 266 p.

[Itinerario. Voyage or Navigation of Jan Huygen van Linschoten to the East or Portuguese Indies, 1579–1592. Part 1 / 2]

- 3. Korte Historiael ende Journaels Aenteyckeninge van verscheyden voyagiens in de vier deelen des wereldts-ronde, als Europa, Africa, Asia ende Amerika gedaen door David Pietersz. de Vries. Onder redactie van H. T. Colenbrander. 1911. xliv, 302 p.

[Short Historical and Journal Notes of Various Voyages to the Four Parts of the World—Europe, Africa, Asia, and America—Made by David Pietersz. de Vries]

- 4. De Reis van mr. Jacob Roggeveen ter ontdekking van het Zuidland, 1721-1722. Onder redactie van F. E. Baron Mulert, met een aanhangsel over de waarnemingen der kompasmiswijzing op Roggeveen's tocht, verricht door W. van Bemmelen. 1911. xxvii, 331 p.

[The Voyage of Mr. Jacob Roggeveen for the Discovery of the South Land, 1721–1722]

- 5. Beschrijvinghe ende historische verhael van het Gout Koninckrijck van Gunea anders de Gout-custe de Mina genaemt, liggende in het deel van Africa, door P. de Marees. Onder redactie van S.P. L'Honoré Naber. 1912. lxxii, 314 p.

[Description and Historical Account of the Gold Kingdom of Guinea, also called the Gold Coast of Mina, located in the part of Africa, by P. de Marees]

- 6. Toortse der Zeevaert door Dierick Ruiters, 1623. Samuel Brun's Schiffarten, 1624. Onder redactie van S.P. L'Honoré Naber. 1913. lxi, 206 p.

[Torch of Navigation by Dierick Ruiters, 1623. Samuel Brun's Voyages, 1624]

- 7. De Eerste Schipvaart der Nederlanders naar Oost-Indië onder Cornelis de Houtman, 1595-1597. Deel 1. Onder redactie van G.P. Rouffaer en J.W.IJzerman. 1915. xxxiv, 248 p.

The First Voyage of the Dutch to the East Indies under Cornelis de Houtman, 1595–1597. Part 1

- 8. Reizen van Jan Huyghen van Linschoten naar het Noorden, 1594-1595. Onder redactie van S.P. L'Honoré Naber. 1914. lxxxiv, 308 p.

[Voyages of Jan Huyghen van Linschoten to the North, 1594–1595]

- 9. Dirck Gerritsz. Pomp, alias Dirck Gerritsz. China. De eerste Nederlander die China en Japan bezocht. 1544-1604. Zijn reis naar en verblijf in Zuid-Amerika. Onder redactie van J.W. IJzerman. 1915. xxii, 195 p.

[Dirck Gerritsz. Pomp, also known as Dirck Gerritsz. China. The first Dutchman to visit China and Japan, 1544–1604. His journey to and stay in South America]

- 10. De Open-Deure tot het verborgen heydendom, door Abraham Rogerius. Onder redactie van W. Caland. 1915. xliv, 222 p.

[The Open Door to Hidden Heathenism, by Abraham Rogerius]

- 11. Reizen in Zuid-Afrika in de Hollandse tijd. Deel 1. Onder redactie van E.C. Godée Molsbergen. 1916. xv, 254 p.

[Travels in South Africa in the Dutch Era. Part 1]

- 12. Reizen in Zuid-Afrika in de Hollandse tijd. Deel 2. Onder redactie van E.C. Godée Molsbergen. 1916. xxiv, 271 p.

[Travels in South Africa in the Dutch Era. Part 2]

- 13. De Oost-Indische Compagnie in Cambodja en Laos. Onder redactie van Hendrik P.N. Muller. 1917. lxviii, 463 p.

[The East India Company in Cambodia and Laos]

- 14. Reizen van Willem Barents, Jacob van Heemskerck, Jan Cornelisz Rijp en anderen naar het Noorden, 1594-1597. Verhaald door Gerrit de Veer. Deel 1. Onder redactie van S.P. L'Honoré Naber. 1917. 178 p.

[Voyages of Willem Barents, Jacob van Heemskerck, Jan Cornelisz Rijp, and others to the North, 1594–1597. Narrated by Gerrit de Veer. Part 1]

- 15. Reizen van Willem Barents, Jacob van Heemskerck, Jan Cornelisz Rijp en anderen naar het Noorden, 1594-1597. Verhaald door Gerrit de Veer. Deel 2. Onder redactie van S.P. L'Honoré Naber. 1917. cxxvi, 341 p.

[Voyages of Willem Barents, Jacob van Heemskerck, Jan Cornelisz Rijp, and others to the North, 1594–1597. Narrated by Gerrit de Veer. Part 2]

- 16. Journael van de Reis naar Zuid-Amerika door Hendrik Ottsen, 1598-1601. Onder redactie van J.W. IJzerman. 1918. clxxix, 253 p.

[Journal of the Voyage to South America by Hendrik Ottsen, 1598–1601]

- 17. De Reizen van Abel Janszoon Tasman en Franchoys Jacobszoon Visscher, ter nadere ontdekking van het Zuidland (Australië) in 1642-1644. Onder redactie van R. Posthumus Meyjes. 1919. xcviii, 300 p.

[The Voyages of Abel Janszoon Tasman and Franchoys Jacobszoon Visscher for the Further Discovery of the Southland (Australia), 1642–1644]

- 18. Verhaal van het vergaan van het jacht de Sperwer en van het wedervaren der schipbreukelingen op het eiland Quelpaert en het vasteland van Korea (1653-1666). Met eene beschrijving van dat rijk, door Hendrik Hamel. Onder redactie van B. Hoeting. 1920. lxxv, 165 p.

[Account of the Wreck of the Yacht De Sperwer and of the Experiences of the Castaways on the Island of Quelpaert and the Mainland of Korea (1653–1666). With a Description of That Kingdom, by Hendrik Hamel]

- 19. Henry Hudson's Reize onder Nederlandsche vlag van Amsterdam naar Nova Zembla, Amerika en terug naar Dartmouth in Engeland, 1609. Volgens het journaal van Robert Juet. Onder redactie van S.P. L'Honoré Naber. 192 l. cxxiv, 138 p.

[Henry Hudson’s Voyage under the Dutch Flag from Amsterdam to Novaya Zemlya, America, and Back to Dartmouth in England, 1609. According to the Journal of Robert Juet]

- 20. Reizen in Zuid-Afrika in de Hollandse tijd. Deel 3. Onder redactie van E.C. Godée Molsbergen, inl. R. Posthumus Meyjes. 1922. xxxii, 368 p.

[Travels in South Africa in the Dutch Period. Part 3]

- 21. De Reis van Mahu en De Cordes door de Straat van Magalhaes naar Zuid-Amerika en Japan, 1598-1600. Deel 1. Onder redactie van F.C. Wieder. 1923. xv, 319 p.

[The Voyage of Mahu and de Cordes through the Strait of Magellan to South America and Japan, 1598–1600. Part 1]

- 22. De Reis van Mahu en de Cordes door de Straat van Magalhaes naar Zuid-Amerika en Japan, 1598-1600. Deel 2. Onder redactie van F.C. Wieder. 1924. xii, 119 p.

[The Voyage of Mahu and de Cordes through the Strait of Magellan to South America and Japan, 1598–1600. Part 2]

- 23. Hessel Gerritsz, Beschryvinghe van der Samoyeden Landt en Histoire du pays nommé Spitsberghe. Onder redactie van S.P. L'Honoré Naber. 1924. liv, 125 p.

[Hessel Gerritsz, Description of the Land of the Samoyeds and Histoire du pays nommé Spitsberghe]

- 24. De Reis van Mahu en de Cordes door de Straat van Magalhaes naar Zuid-Amerika en Japan, 1598-1600. Deel 3. Onder redactie van F.C. Wieder. 1925. XII en 232 p.

[The Voyage of Mahu and de Cordes through the Strait of Magellan to South America and Japan, 1598–1600. Part 3]

- 25. De Eerste Schipvaart der Nederlanders naar Oost-Indië onder Cornelis de Houtman, 1595-1597. Deel 2. Onder redactie van G.P. Rouffaer en J.W. I Jzerman. 1925. lxxxviii, 426 p.

[The First Dutch Voyage to the East Indies under Cornelis de Houtman, 1595–1597. Part 2]

- 26. De Stichting van New-York in Juli 1625. Onder redactie van F.C. Wieder. 1925. xi, 242 p. Bevat: reconstructies en nieuwe gegevens ontleend aan de Van Rappard -documenten.

[The Founding of New York in July 1625]

- 27. De Reis om de Wereld door Olivier van Noort, 1598-1601. Deel 1. Onder redactie van J.W. IJzerman. 1926. viii, 265 p.

[The Voyage Around the World by Olivier van Noort, 1598–1601. Part 1]

- 28. De Reis om de Wereld door Olivier van Noort, 1598-1601. Deel 2. Onder redactie van J.W. IJzerman. 1926. xii, 300 p.

[The Voyage Around the World by Olivier van Noort, 1598–1601. Part 2]

- 29. De Eerste Nederlandse Transatlantische Stoomvaart in 1827 van Zr. Ms. Stoompakket Curacao. Deel 1. Onder redactie van J.W. van Nouhuys. 1927. xxvi, 186 p. Bevat: het journaal.

[The First Dutch Transatlantic Steam Voyage in 1827 of H.M. Steam Packet Curaçao. Part 1]

- 30. De Zeeuwsche Expeditie naar de West onder Cornelis Evertsen den Jonge, 1672-1674. Nieuw Nederland een jaar onder Nederlandsch Bestuur. Onder redactie van C. de Waard. 1928. lxix, 237 p.

[The Zeeland Expedition to the West under Cornelis Evertsen the Younger, 1672–1674. New Netherland One Year under Dutch Rule]

- 31. De Remonstrantie van W. Geleynssen de Jongh. Onder redactie van W. Caland. 1929. xv, 127 p.

[The Remonstrance of W. Geleynssen de Jongh]

- 32. De Eerste Schipvaart der Nederlanders naar Oost-Indië onder Cornelis de Houtman, 1595-1597. Deel 3. Onder redactie van G.P. Rouffaer en J.W. IJzerman. 1929. lxxv, 439 p.

[The First Voyage of the Dutch to the East Indies under Cornelis de Houtman, 1595–1597. Part 3]

- 33. Reisen van Nicolaus de Graaff. Gedaan naar alle gewesten des Werelds. Beginnende 1639 tot 1687 incluis.-Oost-Indise Spiegel. Onder redactie van J.C.M. Warnsinck. 1930. xxxiii, 230, vii, 132 p.

[Travels of Nicolaus de Graaff. Made to All Regions of the World, Beginning 1639 to 1687 Inclusive – East Indies Mirror]

- 34. Joannes de Laet. Iaerlyck verhael van de Verrichtinghen der Geoctroyeerde West-Indische Compagnie in derthien Boecken. Deel 1. Onder redactie van S.P. L'Honoré Naber. 1931. xxix, 224 p.

[Joannes de Laet. Annual Account of the Operations of the Chartered West India Company in Thirteen Books. Part 1]

- 35. Joannes de Laet. Iaerlyck verhael van de Uerrichtinghen der Geoctroyeerde West-Indische Compagnie in derthien Boecken. Deel 2. Onder redactie van S.P. L'Honoré Naber. 1932. xx, 215 p.

[Joannes de Laet. Annual Account of the Operations of the Chartered West India Company in Thirteen Books. Part 2]

- 36. Reizen in Zuid-Afrika in de Hollandse tijd. Deel 4. Onder redactie van E.C. Godée Molsbergen. xxxii, 366 p. 1932

[Travels in South Africa in the Dutch Era. Part 4]

- 37. Joannes de Laet. Iaerlyck verhael van de Uerrichtinghen der Geoctroyeerde West-Indische Compagnie in derthien Boecken. Deel 3. Onder redactie van S.P. L’Honoré Naber. 1934. XX en 234 p.

[Joannes de Laet. Annual Account of the Operations of the Chartered West India Company in Thirteen Books. Part 3]

- 38. De Reis van Joris van Spilbergen naar Ceylon, Atjeh en Bantam, 1601-1604. 1933. lxi, 126 p.

[The Journey of Joris van Spilbergen to Ceylon, Aceh, and Bantam, 1601–1604]

- 39. Itinerario. Voyage ofte schipvaert van Jan Huygen van Linschoten naar Oost ofte Portugaels Indiën, 1579-1592. Deel 3. Onder redactie van C.P. Burger Jr. en F.W.T. Hunger. 1934. xxxiv, 337 p.

[Itinerario. Voyage or Navigation of Jan Huygen van Linschoten to the East or Portuguese Indies, 1579–1592. Part 3]

- 40. Joannes de Laet. Iaerlyck verhael van de Verrichtinghen der Geoctroyeerde West-Indische Compagnie in derthien Boecken. Deel 4. Onder redactie van S.P. L'Honoré Naber en J.C.M. Warnsinck. 1937. lxxxvi, 330 p.

[Joannes de Laet. Annual Account of the Operations of the Chartered West India Company in Thirteen Books. Part 4]

- 41. Journaal van J.J. Ketelaar's hofreis naar den Groot Mogol te Lahore, 1711-1713. Onder redactie van J.Ph. Vogel. 1937. xxvii, 454 p.

[Journal of J.J. Ketelaar's Court Journey to the Great Mogul in Lahore, 1711–1713]

- 42. De Tweede Schipvaart der Nederlanders naar Oost-Indië onder Jacob Cornelisz. van Neck en Wybrand van Warwijck, 1598-1600. Deel 1. Onder redactie van J. Keuning. 1938. CXIV en l83 p.

[The Second Voyage of the Dutch to the East Indies under Jacob Cornelisz. van Neck and Wybrand van Warwijck, 1598–1600. Part 1]

- 43. [1] Itinerario. Voyage ofte schipvaert van Jan Huygen van Linschoten naer Oost ofte Portugaels Indiën, 1579-1592. Deel 4. Onder redactie van J.C.M. Warnsinck. 1939. lxxx, p. 1-144.
  43. [2] Itinerario. Voyage ofte schipvaert van Jan Huygen van Linschoten naer Oost ofte Portugaels Indiën, 1579-1592. Deel 5. Onder redactie van J.C.M. Warnsinck. 1939. p. 145-446.

[Itinerario. Voyage or Navigation of Jan Huygen van Linschoten to the East or Portuguese Indies, 1579–1592. Part 4 / 5]

- 44. De Tweede Schipvaart der Nederlanders naar Oost-Indië onder Jacob Cornelisz. van Neck en Wybrant Warwijck, 1598-1600. Deel 2. Onder redactie van J. Keuning. 1940. lxxxiv, 262 p. & afzonderlijke portefeuille met 8 kaarten.

[The Second Voyage of the Dutch to the East Indies under Jacob Cornelisz. van Neck and Wybrand van Warwijck, 1598–1600. Part 2]

- 45. Journaal van Dircq van Adrichem's hofreis naar den Groot-Mogol Aurangzëb, 1662. Onder redactie van A.J. Bernet-Kempers. 1941 xx, 275 p.

[Journal of Dirck van Adrichem's Court Journey to the Great Mogul Aurangzeb, 1662]

- 46. De Tweede Schipvaart der Nederlanders naar Oost-Indië onder Jacob Cornelisz. van Neck en Wybrant Warwijck, 1598-1600. Deel 3. Onder redactie van J. Keuning. 1942.xx, 275 p.

[The Second Voyage of the Dutch to the East Indies under Jacob Cornelisz. van Neck and Wybrand van Warwijck, 1598–1600. Part 3]

- 47. [1] De Reis om de Wereld van Joris van Spilbergen, 1614-1617. Onder redactie van J.C.M. Warnsinck. 1943. cxxxi, 5, 192 p.
  47. [2] De Reis om de Wereld van Joris van Spilbergen, 1614-1617. Onder redactie van J.C.M. Warnsinck. 1943. 27 platen in één band

[The Voyage Around the World of Joris van Spilbergen, 1614–1617. Part 3]

- 48. De Tweede Schipvaart der Nederlanders naar Oost-Indië onder Jacob Cornelisz. van Neck en Wybrant Warwijck, 1598-1600. Deel 4. Onder redactie van J. Keuning. 1944. l, 219 p.

[The Second Voyage of the Dutch to the East Indies under Jacob Cornelisz. van Neck and Wybrand van Warwijck, 1598–1600. Part 4]

- 49. [1] De ontdekkingsreis van Jacob Le Maire en Willem Cornelisz Schouten in de jaren 1615-1617. Deel 1. Onder redactie van W.A. Engelbrecht en P.J. van Herwerden. 1945 xxiv, 19, 229 p.
  49. [2] De ontdekkingsreis van Jacob Le Maire en Willem Cornelisz Schouten in de jaren 1615-1617. Deel 2. Onder redactie van W.A. Engelbrecht en P.J. van Herwerden. 1945 xv, 265 p. & 3 losse kaarten.

[The Voyage of Discovery of Jacob Le Maire and Willem Cornelisz Schouten in the Years 1615–1617. Part 1 / 2]

- 50. [1] De Tweede Schipvaart der Nederlanders naar Oost-Indië onder Jacob Cornelisz. van Neck en Wybrant Warwijck, 1598-1600. Deel 5, 1ste stuk. Onder redactie van J. Keuning. 1947. xvi, 235 p.
  50. [2] De Tweede Schipvaart der Nederlanders naar Oost-Indië onder Jacob Cornelisz. van Neck en Wybrant Warwijck, 1598-1600. Deel 5, 2e stuk. Onder redactie van J. Keuning. 1949. xvi, 318 p. & afzonderlijke portefeuille met 14 kaarten.
  [3] De Tweede Schipvaart der Nederlanders naar Oost-Indië onder Jacob Cornelisz. van Neck en Wybrant Warwijck, 1598-1600. Deel 5, 3e stuk. Onder redactie van C.E. Warnsinck-Delprat. 1951. xx en 70 p.

[The Second Voyage of the Dutch to the East Indies under Jacob Cornelisz. van Neck and Wybrand van Warwijck, 1598–1600. Part 5.1/2/3]

- 51. De Oudste Reizen van de Zeeuwen naar Oost-Indië, 1598-1604. Onder redactie van W.S. Unger. 1948. liii, 253 p.

[The Earliest Voyages of the Zeelanders to the East Indies, 1598–1604]

- 52. Reizen naar West-Afrika van Pieter van den Broecke, 1605-1614. Onder redactie van K. Ratelband. 1950. cvi, 124 p.

[Travels to West Africa by Pieter van den Broecke, 1605–1614]

- 53. De Eerste Nederlandsche Transatlantische stoomvaart in 1827 van Zr. Ms. stoompakket Curacao. Deel 2. Onder redactie van J.W. van Nouhuys, bijlagen bewerkt door C. Hokke. 1951. xliv, 224 p.

[The First Dutch Transatlantic Steam Voyage in 1827 of H.M. Steam Packet Curaçao. Part 2]

- 54. Journalen vande gedenckwaerdige reijsen van Willem IJsbrantsz. Bontekoe, 1618-1625. Onder redactie van G.J. Hoogewerff, 1952, l. 211 p.

[Journals of the Remarkable Voyages of Willem IJsbrantsz. Bontekoe, 1618–1625]

- 55. Vijf Dagregisters van het kasteel São Jorge da Mina (Elmina) aan de Goudkust, 1645-1647. Onder redactie van K. Ratelband. 1953. cx, 439 p.

[Five Daily Logs of São Jorge da Mina Castle (Elmina) on the Gold Coast, 1645–1647]

- 56. De reis van Mathijs Hendriksz. Quast en Abel Jansz. Tasman ter ontdekking van de Goud- en Zilvereilanden, (1639). Onder redactie van J. Verseput. 1954. lxx, 130 p.

[The Voyage of Mathijs Hendriksz. Quast and Abel Jansz. Tasman to Discover the Gold and Silver Islands, (1639)]

- 57. Itinerario. Voyage ofte schipvaert van Jan Huygen van Linschoten naer Oost ofte Portugaels Indiën, 1579-1592. Eerste stuk. Onder redactie van H. Kern. 2e druk, herzien door H. Terpstra. 1955. xcvi. 163 p.

[Itinerario. Voyage or Navigation of Jan Huygen van Linschoten to the East or Portuguese Indies, 1579–1592. First section]

- 58. Itinerario. Voyage ofte schipvaert van Jan Huygen van Linschoten naer Oost ofte Portugaels Indiën, 1579-1592. Tweede stuk. Onder redactie van H. Kern. 2e dr, herzien door H. Terpstra. 1956. xv, 183 p.

[Itinerario. Voyage or Navigation of Jan Huygen van Linschoten to the East or Portuguese Indies, 1579–1592. Second section]

- 59. De vijf gezantschapsreizen van Rijklof van Goens naar het Hof van Mataram, 1648-1654. Onder redactie van H.J. de Graaf. 1956. xvi, 280 p.

[The Five Diplomatic Missions of Rijklof van Goens to the Court of Mataram, 1648–1654]

- 60. Itinerario. Voyage ofte schipvaert van Jan Huygen van Linschoten naer Oost ofte Portugaels Indiën, 1579-1592. Derde stuk Onder redactie van H. Kern. 2e druk, herzien door H. Terpstra. 1957. xvi, 190 p.

[Itinerario. Voyage or Navigation of Jan Huygen van Linschoten to the East or Portuguese Indies, 1579–1592.]

- 61. De Westafrikaanse Reis van Piet Heyn, 1624-1625. Onder redactie van K. Ratelband. 1959. cv, 79 p. Tweede, ongewijzigde druk, 2005, 176 p.

[The West African Voyage of Piet Heyn, 1624–1625]

- 62. De reis van Michiel Adriaanszoon de Ruyter in 1664-1665. Onder redactie van P. Verhoog en L. Koelmans. 1961. xviii, 364 p. Tweede, ongewijzigde druk, 2005, 384 p.

[The Voyage of Michiel Adriaanszoon de Ruyter in 1664–1665]

- 63. Pieter van den Broecke in Azië. Deel 1. Onder redactie van W.Ph. Coolhaas. 1962. xv, 219 p.

[Pieter van den Broecke in Asia. Part 1]

- 64. Pieter van den Broecke in Azië. Deel 2. Onder redactie van W.Ph. Coolhaas. 1963. 214 p.

[Pieter van den Broecke in Asia. Part 2]

- 65. De reis om de wereld van de Nassausche vloot, 1623-1626. Onder redactie van W. Voorbeijtel Cannenburg. 1964. cxxvii, 133 p.

[The Voyage Around the World of the Nassau Fleet, 1623–1626]

- 66. Nicolaas Witsen. Moscovische Reyse, 1664-1665. Deel 1. Onder redactie van Th.J.G. Locher en P. de Buck. 1966. lxxv, 94 p.

[Nicolaas Witsen: Muscovite Journey, 1664–1665. Part 1]

- 67. Nicolaas Witsen. Moscovische Reyse, 1664-1665. Deel 2. Onder redactie van Th.J.G. Locher en P. de Buck. 1966. 196 p.

[Nicolaas Witsen: Muscovite Journey, 1664–1665. Part 2]

- 68. Nicolaas Witsen. Moscovische Reyse, 1664-1665. Deel 3. Onder redactie van Th.J.G. Locher en P. de Buck. 1967. 247 p.

[Nicolaas Witsen: Muscovite Journey, 1664–1665. Part 3]

- 69. Reijse gedaen bij Adriaen Schagen aen de Croonen van Sweden ende Polen inden jaere 1656. Onder redactie van C E. Warnsinck-Delprat, 1968. xii, 196 p.

[Journey Undertaken by Adriaen Schagen to the Crowns of Sweden and Poland in the Year 1656]

- 70. De derde reis van de V.O.C. naar Oost-Indie onder het beleid van admiraal Paulus van Caerden, uitgezeild in 1606. Deel 1. Onder redactie van A. de Booy. 1968. 213 p.

[The Third VOC Voyage to the East Indies under the Command of Admiral Paulus van Caerden, Sailed in 1606. Part 1]

- 71. De derde reis van de VOC naar Oost-Indie onder het beleid van admiraal Paulus van Caerden, uitgezeild in 1606. Deel 2. Onder redactie van A. de Booy. 1970. xvi, 274 p.

[The Third VOC Voyage to the East Indies under the Command of Admiral Paulus van Caerden, Sailed in 1606. Part 2]

- 72. De expeditie van Anthonio Hurdt, Raad van Indië, als admiraal en superintendent naar de binnenlanden van Java. Sept.-dec. 1678 volgens het journaal van Johan Jurgen Briel, secretaris. Onder redactie van H.J. de Graaf. 1971. x, 288 p.

[The Expedition of Anthonio Hurdt, Council of the Indies, as Admiral and Superintendent to the Interior of Java, September–December 1678, According to the Journal of Johan Jurgen Briel, Secretary]

- 73. De reis van de vloot van Pieter Willemsz. Verhoeff naar Azië, 1607-1612. Deel 1. Onder redactie van M.E. van Opstall. 1972. xviii, 298 p.

[The Voyage of Pieter Willemsz. Verhoeff’s Fleet to Asia, 1607–1612. Part 1]

- 74. De reis van de vloot van Pieter Willemsz. Verhoeff naar Azië, 1607-1612. Deel 2. Onder redactie van M.E. van Opstall. 1972. p. 300-441 & 6 losse kaarten

[The Voyage of Pieter Willemsz. Verhoeff’s Fleet to Asia, 1607–1612. Part 2]

- 75. Dr. Cornelis Pynacker, Historysch verhael van den steden Thunis, Algiers ende andere steden in Barbarien gelegen. Onder redactie van G.S. van Krieken. 1975. x, 206 p.

[Dr. Cornelis Pynacker, Historical Account of the Cities of Tunis, Algiers, and Other Cities in Barbary]

- 76. De reis van Z.M. 'De Vlieg', commandant Willem Kreekel, naar Brazilië 1807-1808. Deel 1. Onder redactie van H.J. de Graaf. 1975. x, 214 p.

[The Voyage of H.M. ‘De Vlieg’, Commanded by Willem Kreekel, to Brazil, 1807–1808. Part 1]

- 77. De reis van Z.M. 'De Vlieg', commandant Willem Kreekel, naar Brazilië 1807-1808. Deel 2. Onder redactie van H.J. de Graaf. 1976. xvi, 417 p.

[The Voyage of H.M. ‘De Vlieg’, Commanded by Willem Kreekel, to Brazil, 1807–1808. Part 2]

- 78. De ontdekkingsreis van Willem Hesselsz. de Vlamingh in de jaren 1696-1697. Deel 1. Onder redactie van G.G. Schilder. 1976. viii, 198 p.

[The Exploration Voyage of Willem Hesselsz. de Vlamingh in the Years 1696–1697. Part 1]

- 79. De ontdekkingsreis van Willem Hesselsz. de Vlamingh in de jaren 1696-1697. Deel 2. Onder redactie van G.G. Schilder. 1976. vi, 134 p.

[The Exploration Voyage of Willem Hesselsz. de Vlamingh in the Years 1696–1697. Part 2]

- 80. De Stad Schiedam. De Schiedamse scheepsrederij en de Nederlandse vaart op Oost-Indië omstreeks 1840. Door F.J.A. Broeze. Met documenten en summary. 1978. xviii, 350 p.

[The City Schiedam. The Schiedam shipping company and Dutch navigation to the East Indies around 1840]

- 81. De geschriften van Fransisco Pelsaert over Mughal India, 1627. Kroniek en Remonstrantie. Onder redactie van D.H.A. Kolff en H.W. van Santen. 1979. vi, 361 p.

[The writings of François Pelsaert on Mughal India, 1627. Chronicle and Remonstrance]

- 82. De vierde schipvaart der Nederlanders naar Oost-Indie' onder Jacob Wilkens en Jacob van Neck, 1599-1604. Deel 1. Onder redactie van Jhr. H.A. van Foreest en A. de Booy. 1980. xiv, 306 p.

[The Fourth Voyage of the Dutch to the East Indies under Jacob Wilkens and Jacob van Neck, 1599–1604. Part 1]

- 83. De vierde schipvaart der Nederlanders naar Oost-Indië onder Jacob Wilkens en Jacob van Neck, 1599-1604. Deel 2. Onder redactie van Jhr. H.A. van Foreest en A. de Booy. 1981, xii, 339 p.

[The Fourth Voyage of the Dutch to the East Indies under Jacob Wilkens and Jacob van Neck, 1599–1604. Part 2]

- 84. De eerste tocht van de Willem Barents naar de Noordelijke IJszee, 1878. Deel 1. Onder redactie van W.F.J. Mörzer Bruyns. 1985. 200 p.

[The First Voyage of the Willem Barents to the Northern Arctic Sea, 1878. Part 1]

- 85. De eerste tocht van de Willem Barents naar de Noordelijke IJszee, 1878. Deel 2. Onder redactie van W.F.J. Mörzer Bruyns. 1985. 168 p.

[The First Voyage of the Willem Barents to the Northern Arctic Sea, 1878. Part 2]

- 86. De eerste landvoogd Pieter Both (1568-1615). Deel 1. Onder redactie van P.J.A.N. Rietbergen. 1987. 184 p.

[The First Governor-General Pieter Both (1568–1615). Part 1]

- 87. De eerste landvoogd Pieter Both (1568-1615). Deel 2. Onder redactie van P.J.A.N. Rietbergen. 1987. 176 p.

[The First Governor-General Pieter Both (1568–1615). Part 2]

- 88. Zijne Majesteits raderstoomschip Soembing overgedragen aan Japan. De drie diplomatieke reizen van kapitein G. Fabius ter opening van Deshima en Nagasaki in 1854, 1855 en 1856. Onder redactie van J. Stellingwerff. 1988. 175 p.

[His Majesty’s Paddle Steamer Soembing Transferred to Japan. The Three Diplomatic Voyages of Captain G. Fabius for the Opening of Dejima and Nagasaki in 1854, 1855, and 1856]

- 89. Het korvet 'Lynx' in Zuid-Amerika, de Filipijnen en Oost-Indië, 1823-1825. De Koninklijke Marine als instrument van het 'politiek systhema' van koning Willem I. Onder redactie van J.E. Oosterling. 1989. 360 p.

[The Corvette Lynx in South America, the Philippines, and the East Indies, 1823–1825. The Royal Navy as an Instrument of King William I’s ‘Political System’]

- 90. 't Verwaerloosde Formosa, of waerachtig verhael, hoedanigh door verwaerloosinge der Nederlanders in Oost-Indien, het Eylant Formosa, van den Chinesen Mandorijn, ende Zeeroover Coxinja, overrompelt, vermeestert, ende ontweldight is geworden. Onder redactie van G.C. Molewijk. 1991. 243 p.

[Neglected Formosa, or a True Account of How, Through the Neglect of the Dutch in the East Indies, the Island of Formosa Was Overrun, Conquered, and Plundered by the Chinese Mandarin and Pirate Coxinga]

- 91. De werken van Jacob Haafner. Deel 1. Onder redactie van J.A. de Moor en P.G.E.I.J. van der Velde. 1992. 367 p. Ongewijzigde herdruk, 1997.

[The Works of Jacob Haafner. Part 1]

- 92. De schipbreuk van de Batavia, 1629. Onder redactie van V.D. Roeper. 1993. 253 p. Ongewijzigde herdruk als paperback, 1994.

[The Shipwreck of the Batavia, 1629]

- 93. De avonturen van een VOC-soldaat : het dagboek van Carolus Van der Haeghe 1699-1705. Onder redactie van J. Parmentier en R. Laarhoven. 1994. 208 p. 2e druk

[The Adventures of a VOC Soldier: The Diary of Carolus Van der Haeghe, 1699–1705]

- 94. De werken van Jacob Haafner Deel 2. Onder redactie van J.A. de Moor en P.G.E.I.J. van der Velde. 1995. 376 p.

[The Works of Jacob Haafner. Part 2]

- 95. Op reis met de VOC : de openhartige dagboeken van de zusters Lammens en Swellengrebel. Onder redactie van M.L. Barend-van Haeften ; met medew. van E.S. van Eyck van Heslinga. 1996. 179 p.

[Travelling with the VOC: The Candid Diaries of the Sisters Lammens and Swellengrebel]

- 96. De werken van Jacob Haafner. Deel 3. Onder redactie van J.A. de Moor en P.G.E.I.J. van der Velde. 1997. 479 p.

[The Works of Jacob Haafner. Part 3]

- 97. Per koets naar Constantinopel : de gezantschapsreis van Baron van Dedem van de Gelder naar Istanbul in 1785. door Joost Frederik Tor, Onder redactie van door J. Schmidt. 1998. 206 p.

[By Coach to Constantinople: The Embassy Journey of Baron van Dedem van de Gelder to Istanbul in 1785]

- 98. In de Indische wateren. Anske Hielke Kuipers, gezaghebbher bij de Gouvernementsmarine. 1833-1902. Onder redactie van M.E. Kuipers. 1999. 446 p.

[In the Indian Waters: Anske Hielke Kuipers, Officer in the Government Navy, 1833–1902]

- 99. Naar de koning van Dahomey. Het journaal van de gezantschapsreis van Jacobus Elet naar het West-Afrikaanse Koninkrijk Dahomey in 1733. Onder redactie van H. den Heijer. 2000. 208 p.

[To the King of Dahomey: The Journal of the Embassy Journey of Jacobus Elet to the West African Kingdom of Dahomey in 1733]

- 100. Dodo's en galjoenen. De reis van het schip Gelderland naar Oost-Indië, 1601-1603. Onder redactie van P. Moree. 2001. 348 p.

[Dodos and Galleons: The Voyage of the Ship Gelderland to the East Indies, 1601–1603]

- 101. De reis van het schip Swarte Leeuw naar Atjeh en Bantam, 1601-1603. Onder redactie van J. Parmentier, K. Davids en J. Everaert. 2003. 256 p.

[The Voyage of the Ship Swarte Leeuw to Aceh and Bantam, 1601–1603]

- 102. Met Prins Hendrik naar de Oost. De reis van W.J.C. Huyssen van Kattendijke naar Nederlands-Indië, 1836-1838. Onder redactie van K. Huyssen van Kattendijke-Frank. 2004. 336 p.

[With Prince Hendrik to the East: The Voyage of W.J.C. Huyssen van Kattendijke to the Dutch East Indies, 1836–1838]

- 103. Lodewijck Huygens' Spaans journaal. Reis naar het hof van de koning van Spanje in het gevolg van het buitengewoon gezantschap van de Staten-Generaal (1660-1661). Onder redactie van M. Ebben. 2005. 352 p.

[Lodewijck Huygens’ Spanish Journal: Journey to the Court of the King of Spain as Part of the Extraordinary Embassy of the States-General (1660–1661)]

- 104. Christenslaven. De slavernij-ervaringen van Cornelis Stout in Algiers (1678-1680) en Maria ter Meetelen in Marokko (1731-1743). Onder redactie van L. van den Broek en M. Jacobs m.m.v. G.J. van Krieken. 2006. 368 p.

[Christian Slaves: The Experiences of Cornelis Stout in Algiers (1678–1680) and Maria ter Meetelen in Morocco (1731–1743)]

- 105. Expeditie naar de Goudkust. Het journaal van Jan Dircksz Lam over de Nederlandse aanval op Elmina, 1625-1626. Onder redactie van H. den Heijer. 2006. 323 p.

[Expedition to the Gold Coast: The Journal of Jan Dircksz Lam on the Dutch Attack on Elmina, 1625–1626]

- 106. Gouverneur Van Imhoff op dienstreis in 1739 naar Cochin, Travancore en Tuticorin, en terug over Jaffna en Mannar naar Colombo. Bezorgd door L. Wagenaar, A. Galjaard, M. Nierop en M. Speelman. 2007. 352 p.

[Governor Van Imhoff on Official Travel in 1739 to Cochin, Travancore, and Tuticorin, and Return via Jaffna and Mannar to Colombo]

- 107. Herinnering aan een reis naar Oost-Indië. Reisverslag en aquarellen van Maurits Ver Huell (1815-1819). Bezorgd door Ch.F. van Fraassen en P.J. Klapwijk. 2008. 701 p.

[Memories of a Journey to the East Indies: Travel Account and Watercolors by Maurits Ver Huell (1815–1819)]

- 108. Suiker, verfhout en tabak. Het Braziliaanse Handboek van Johannes de Laet. Bezorgd door B.N. Teensma. 2009. 192 p.

[Sugar, Dyewood, and Tobacco: The Brazilian Handbook of Johannes de Laet]

- 109. Oorlog in Atjeh. Het journaal van luitenant-ter-zee Henricus Nijgh. Bezorgd door H. Stapelkamp. 2010. 192 p.

[War in Aceh: The Journal of Navy Lieutenant Henricus Nijgh]

- 110. Driftig van spraak, levendig van gang. Herinneringen van marineofficier D.H. Kolff (1761-1835). Bezorgd door V.A.J. Klooster en D.H.A. Kolff. 2011. 249 p.

[Quick of Speech, Lively in Action: Memoirs of Naval Officer D.H. Kolff (1761–1835)]

- 111. Voor zilver en Zeeuws belang. De rampzalige Zuidzee-expeditie van de Middelburgse Commercie Compagnie, 1724-1727. Bezorgd door R. Paesie. 2012. 272 p.

[For Silver and Zeeland Interests: The Disastrous South Sea Expedition of the Middelburg Commercial Company, 1724–1727]

- 112. Machtsstrijd om Malakka. De reis van VOC-admiraal Cornelis Cornelisz. Matelief naar Oost-Azië, 1605-1608. Bezorgd door Leo Akveld, 2013, 400 p.

[Power Struggle over Malacca: The Voyage of VOC Admiral Cornelis Cornelisz. Matelief to East Asia, 1605–1608]

- 113. Verdrinken zonder water. De memoires van VOC-matroos Jan Ambrosius Hoorn, 1758-1778. Bezorgd door Perry Moree en Piet van Sterkenburg, 2014, 256 p.

[Drowning Without Water: The Memoirs of VOC Sailor Jan Ambrosius Hoorn, 1758–1778]

- 114. Goud en Indianen. Het verhaal van Hendrick Brouwers expeditie naar Chili in 1643. Bezorgd door Henk den Heijer, 2015, 352 p.

[Gold and Indigenous Peoples: The Account of Hendrick Brouwer's Expedition to Chile in 1643]

- 115. Terug naar de Oost. De reis van VOC-chirurgijn Gijsbert Heeck, 1654-1656. Bezorgd door Barend Jan Terwiel en Peter Kirsch, 2017, 448 p.

[Back to the East: The Voyage of VOC Surgeon Gijsbert Heeck, 1654–1656]

- 116. Op reis met pen en penseel. Frans en Jan Hendrik Lebret als toerist naar Java, 1863. Bezorgd door Anne Leussink en Wyke Sybesma, 2017, 544 p.

[Traveling with Pen and Brush: Frans and Jan Hendrik Lebret as Tourists to Java, 1863]

- 117. Met de Triton en Iris naar Nieuw-Guinea: de reisverhalen van Justin Modera en Arnoldus Johannes van Delden uit 1828. Bezorgd door Willem Mörzer Bruyns, 2018, 384 p.

[To New Guinea with the Triton and Iris: The Travel Accounts of Justin Modera and Arnoldus Johannes van Delden from 1828]

- 118. Ten exempel van anderen. De processen tegen opvarenden van de piratenschepen Trompeuse en Resolution in Suriname en op St. Thomas in 1684. Bezorgd door Karwan Fatah-Black en Aart Ruijter, 2019, 192 p.

[As an Example to Others: The Trials of Crew Members from the Pirate Ships Trompeuse and Resolution in Suriname and on St. Thomas in 1684]

- 119. Kunstenaar op Java: de reisdagboeken en natuurtekeningen van Pieter van Oort (1825-1833). Bezorgd door Andreas Weber en Sylvia van Zanen, 2021, 480 p.

["Artist in Sumatra: The Travel Diaries and Natural Drawings of Pieter van Oort (1833–1834)]

- 120. Kunstenaar op Sumatra: de reisdagboeken en natuurtekeningen van Pieter van Oort (1833-1834). Bezorgd door Andreas Weber en Sylvia van Zanen, 2021, 288 p.

["Artist in Sumatra: The Travel Diaries and Natural Drawings of Pieter van Oort (1833–1834)]

- 121. Het goud in mijn beurs in plaats van op de rok. De 'Herinneringen' van koopvaardijkapitein Cornelis Abrahamsz jr. (1802-1879). Bezorgd door Willem F.J. Mörzer Bruyns, 2022, 528 p.

[The 'Memoirs' of Merchant Navy Captain Cornelis Abrahamsz Jr. (1802–1879)]

- 122. Een jaar bij de ijsberen: het logboek van de Nederlandse Spitsbergen Expeditie 1968-1969. Bezorgd door Hans Beelen, Ko de Korte en Fineke te Raa, 2022, 416 p.

[A Year with the Polar Bears: The Logbook of the Dutch Spitsbergen Expedition, 1968–1969]

- 123. Een ontdekking van de wereld in de achttiende eeuw: reisdagboek van de Gentse aalmoezenier Michael de Febure 1721-1722. Bezorgd door Jan Parmentier en Kristin Van Damme, 2023, 304 p.

[A Discovery of the World in the Eighteenth Century: Travel Diary of the Ghent Chaplain Michael de Febure, 1721–1722]

- 124. Een burgerman op avontuur: de reis van Jan Jacob Bertold naar Nederlands-Indië in 1818-1819. Bezorgd door Sjoerd de Meer, 2024, 304 p.

[A Citizen on an Adventure: The Voyage of Jan Jacob Bertold to the Dutch East Indies, 1818–1819]

- 125. Bestemming Suriname: Drie zeventiende-eeuwse reizen naar een vroege plantagekolonie. Bezorgd door Nettie Schwartz en Suze Zijlstra, 2025, 208 p.

[Destination Suriname: Three Seventeenth-Century Voyages to an Early Plantation Colony]

N.B.: From 1909 through 1981 (volumes 1 to 83), the publisher was Martinus Nijhoff in The Hague; from 1985 (volume 84) to the present, the publisher has been Walburg Pers in Zutphen.

=== Registers ===
- Tresoor der Zee- en Landreizen. Beredeneerd register op de werken der Linschoten-Vereeniging. Deel I-XXV. Bewerkt door D. Sepp. 1939. xi, 544 p. Bevat tevens 'errata-addenda' op de delen 1–25.
- Tresoor der Zee- en Landreizen. Beredeneerd register op de werken der Linschoten-Vereeniging. Deel XXV-L. Bewerkt door C. G. M. van Romburgh & C. E. Warnsinck-Delprat. 1957. xi, 829 p. Bevat tevens 'errata-addenda' op de delen 26–50.
- Tresoor der Zee- en Landreizen III. Beredeneerd register op de werken der Linschoten-Vereeniging. Deel LI-C. Samengesteld door P. de Bode. 2007. xxii, 888 p.

=== Occasional publications ===
- New light form Spanish archives on the voyages of Olivier van Noort. The Vice-Admiral, the 'Hendrick Frederick' on the West Coast of the Americas 1600. Onder redactie van Engel Sluiter. 1937. p. 34–48. Overdruk uit Bijdragen voor de Vaderlandsche Geschiedenis en Oudheidkunde Serie 7, 8, deel 1/2.
- Cornelis Taemsz. Vaygats ofte de Straet van Nassau. Ode tot lof van Jan Huygen van Linschoten. Toegelicht door Mise Visser. 1942. 24 p.
- De reizen naar de West van Cornelis Cornelisz. Jol, alias Kapitein Houtebeen 1626–1640. Door J.B. van Overeem. 1942. 37 p. Overdruk uit de West-Indische Gids XXIV.
- De expeditie van Jol naar Angola en Sao Thomé. 30 Mei 1641–31 Oct. 1641. Door K. Ratelband. 1943. 24 p. Overdruk uit de West-Indische Gids XXIV.
- Johan van der Veken en zijn tijd. Door J. H. Kernkamp. 1952. 35 p.
- Reizen door de eeuwen heen: 100 jaar Linschoten-Vereeniging (1908–2008). Onder redactie van Henk den Heijer en Cees van Romburgh. Walburg Pers, 2008, 142 p.

== See also ==
- Works issued by the Hakluyt Society (in German)
- Naval history of the Netherlands
- Maritiem Museum

== Bibliography ==
- De Linschoten-Vereeniging. Kort overzicht van haar daden en streven. Een opwekking gericht tot alle ontwikkelde vaderlanders, Den Haag, 1948
- Reizen door de eeuwen heen. 100 jaar Linschoten-Vereeniging (1908–2008), Zutphen, 2008, ISBN 905730564X
