= Baltazar de Cordes =

Dutch pirate

Baltazar de Cordes (16th century– 3 January 1601), the brother of Simon de Cordes, was a Dutch corsair who fought against the Spanish Empire during the early 17th century.

Born in the Dutch Republic in the mid-16th century, Cordes began sailing for the Netherlands against the Spanish Empire during the Eighty Years' War. Baltazar possibly arrived in the Pacific during the 1598 Magellano Company expedition attempting to circumnavigate South America. This expedition, under the command of Admiral Jacques Mahu, consisted of five ships. One of the vessels, the Liefde ("Love" or "Charity"), reached Japan in 1600, pilot William Adams among the surviving crew. He succeeded Captain Jurriaan van Bokholt (or Van Boekhout) who died around August 23, 1599 shortly after traversing the Straits of Magellan.

In late 1599 (it is not known whether before or after the raid on Chiloe), Cordes occupied the Spanish colony of Castro, Chile. In April 1600, with combined Dutch and native forces, Cordes organized the capture of the island of Chiloé off the coast of Chilean Patagonia. However, Cordes' forces suffered heavy losses upon the recapture of the city by the Spanish, executing all but 23 Dutch and over 300 natives (thought to be Huilliches). Cordes' ship, the Trouw (Faith), sailed to the Portuguese colony of Tidore, an East Indies trading post, with the surviving sailors, where they were stabbed to death by Portuguese soldiers on 3 January 1601.
