= Simon de Cordes =

Dutch merchant and explorer

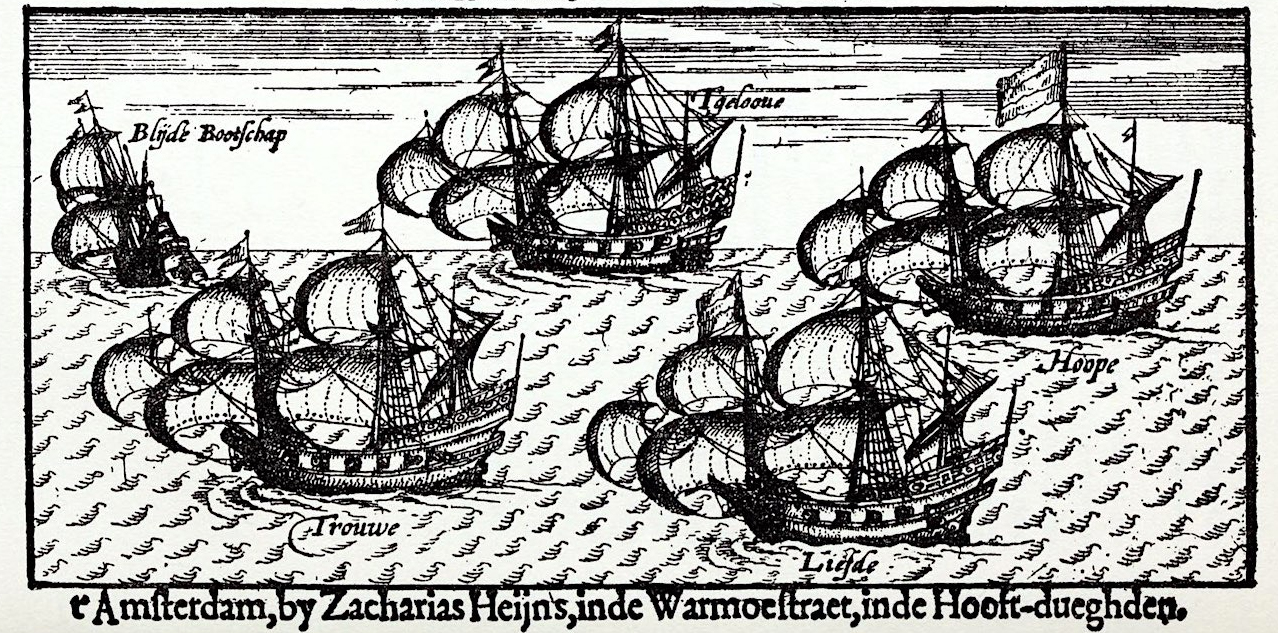
The five ships of the Dutch trading fleet were bristling with weaponry; many suspected their real mission was plunder and pillage.

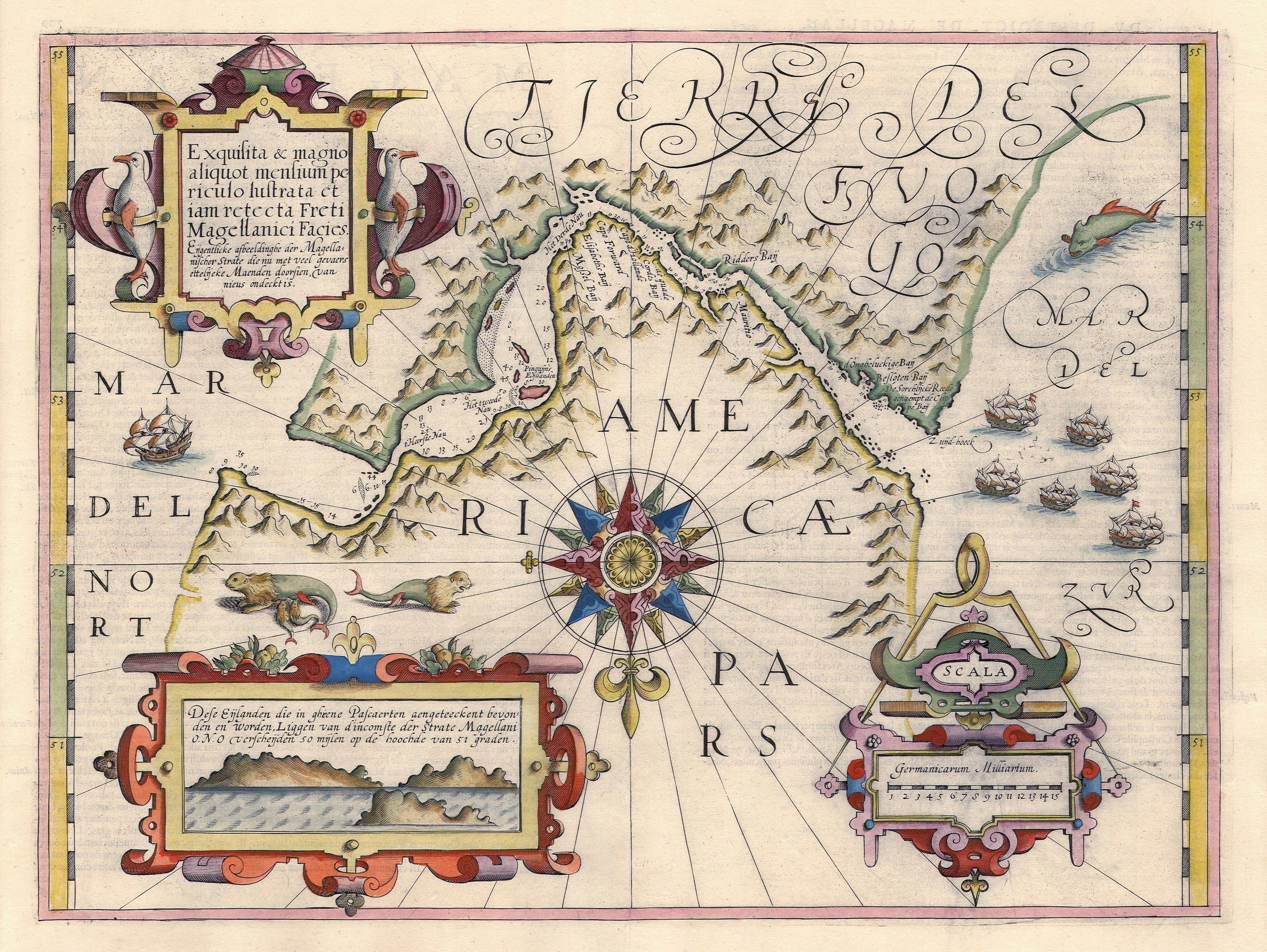
Straat Magellaan (1606) by Jodocus Hondius

Simon de Cordes (c. 1559 – 11 November 1599) was a Dutch merchant and explorer who, following the death of Admiral Jacques Mahu, assumed command of an expedition originally intended to reach the Indies. The objective was later changed to Chile, Peru, and other territories, including regions of New Spain such as Nueva Galicia, the Captaincy General of Guatemala, Nueva Vizcaya, the New Kingdom of León, and Santa Fe de Nuevo México.

The fleet's original plan was to sail along the west coast of South America, trading their cargo for silver, gold, or pearls, and to proceed to Japan only if the first mission failed. In that case, they were to obtain silver in Japan, purchase spices in the Moluccas, and return to Europe via the Cape of Good Hope. The route required navigating through the Strait of Magellan, a passage feared by many sailors due to its severe weather conditions.

The expedition was organised by a voorcompagnie, the Magelhaen Company, which prepared two fleets of five and four ships, manned by 750 sailors and soldiers, with the aim of undermining Spanish interests. The venture ended in disaster; approximately 80% of the crew perished during the voyage, and the investors earned no profit. No complete account of the journey survives, but details are available from an unofficial journal kept by Potgieter, a surgeon, letters from William Adams, and information obtained by the squadron of Oliver van Noort.

== Background ==
Dutch and English ships had been prohibited from entering the ports of Cádiz, Seville, and Lisbon since 1585. International trade at the time generally required payment in Spanish dollars (pieces of eight) or silver, which was widely accepted across the world. To obtain silver, merchants aimed to trade as close as possible to the main Spanish colonial sources in Argentina, Peru, Potosí (in present-day Bolivia, home to a major Spanish colonial silver mint), Mexico, or Japan.

In 1596, the peak year of silver production in Spanish America, total silver exports were valued at approximately 7,000,000 pesos, of which the Spanish crown received around 1,550,000 pesos. The remainder went to institutions such as the Casa de Contratación and the Consulado. That same year, a combined English–Dutch fleet sacked Cádiz in an attempt to seize the Spanish treasure fleet. The raid contributed to Spain's declaration of bankruptcy in 1597, following the costly preparations for a Third Armada.

In 1598, several Dutch merchants organised a fleet to sail to South America with the dual aim of conducting trade and attacking Spanish interests. Each vessel carried six English musicians, approximately 60 soldiers, arms, gunpowder, and bricks to construct a stronghold. Several Dutch cities contributed artillery and munitions. The ships also carried spare parts to construct a smaller vessel, along with salted meat, grains, and beans, but no live cattle. The vessels and their initial captains were:

- Hoop ("Hope"), commanded by Admiral Jacques Mahu (1564–1598); this ship was lost near the Hawaiian Islands.
- Liefde ("Love"), under Vice-Admiral Simon de Cordes, who brought his son and had William Adams as chief navigator; this ship reached Bungo, Japan.
- Trouw ("Loyalty"), commanded by Jurriaen van Boekhout (c. 1569–1599) of Dordrecht; this ship was captured in Tidore.
- Geloof ("Faith"), under Gerrit van Beuningen (c. 1565–1599) of Emden, who had previously sailed to Asia with Cornelis de Houtman but was kept prisoner during most of that voyage; Geloof returned to Rotterdam.
- Blijde Boodschap ("Good Tiding"), a scout ship under Sebald de Weert; it was seized near Valparaíso.

The expedition was organised by Pieter van der Hagen of Middelburg and Johan van der Veeken of Rotterdam, who hired not only Mahu and De Cordes but also Olivier van Noort, a local innkeeper. Van Noort departed Rotterdam a week later, on 2 July 1598, with four ships and about 250 men, aiming to attack Spanish possessions in the Pacific and to trade with China and the Spice Islands, in the context of the ongoing Eighty Years' War between the Dutch Republic and Spain (and its ally Portugal).

== On the Atlantic ==
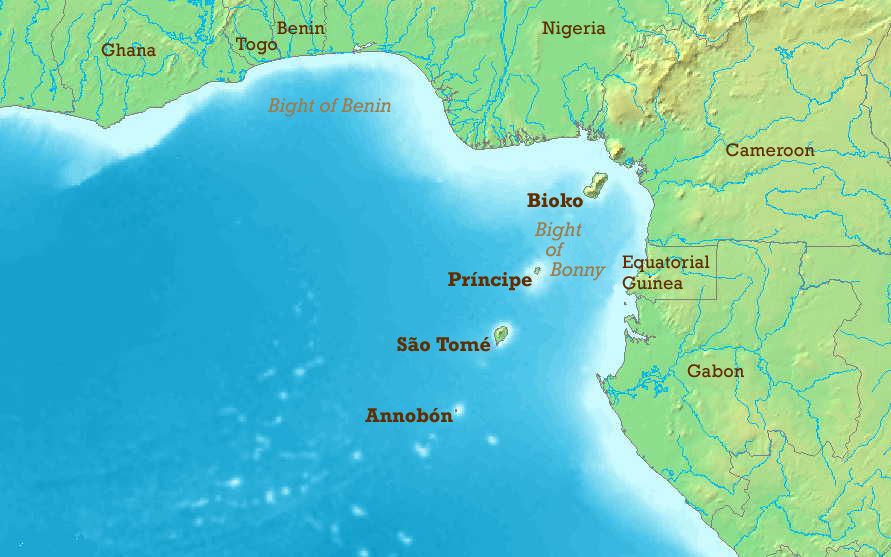
Location of Annobón in the Gulf of Guinea

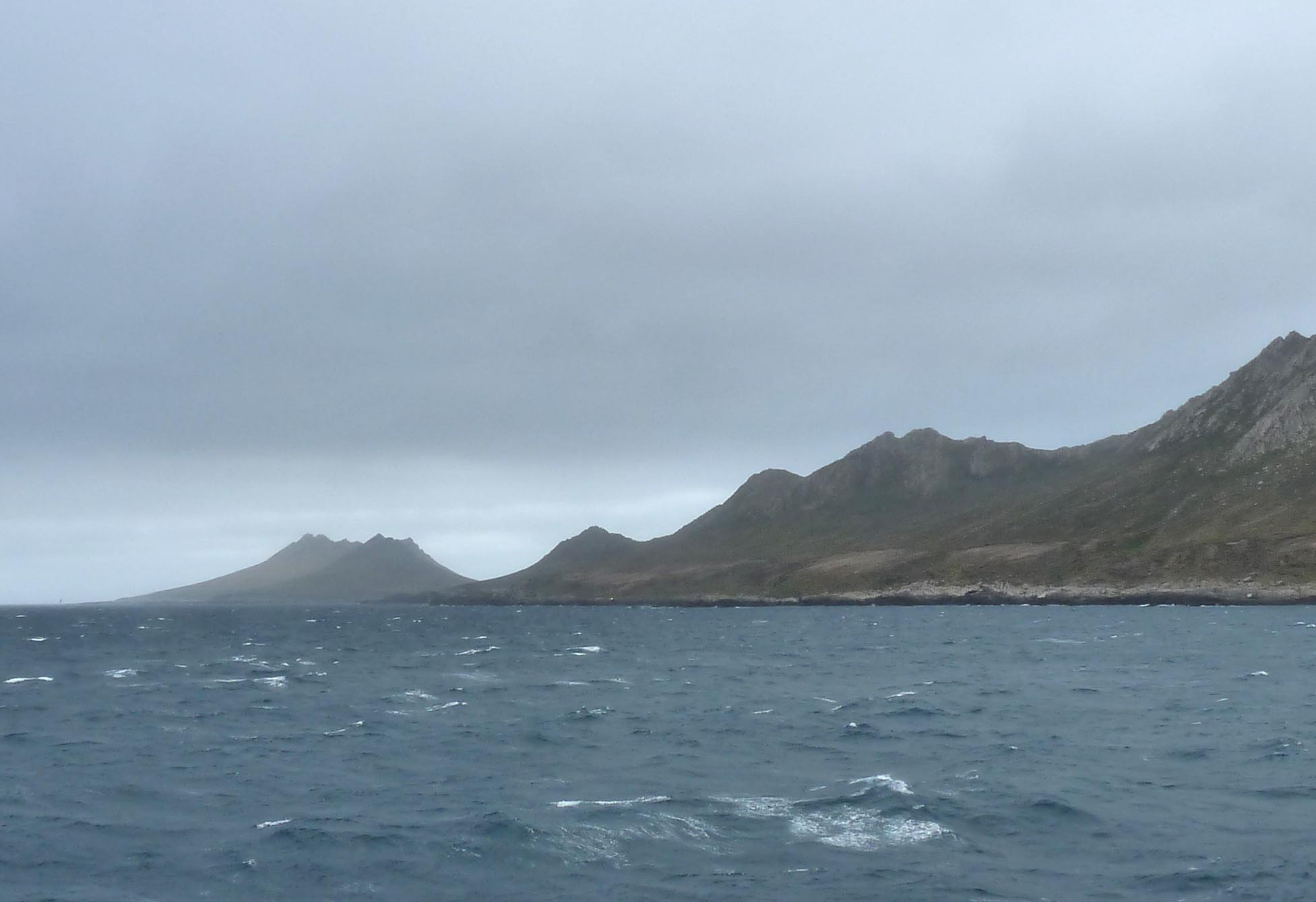
Grand Jason, near the Falkland Islands, is a private nature reserve owned by the Wildlife Conservation Society of New York City

After departing Goeree and Brielle on 27 June 1598, the fleet sailed into the English Channel but anchored in the Downs until mid-July. When approaching the coast of North Africa, Vice-Admiral Simon de Cordes realised he had been overly generous with provisions during the early weeks of the voyage and introduced a rationing policy for bread.

At the end of August, the expedition landed on Santiago in the Cape Verde Islands, and on 1 September on the island of Maio, in search of fresh water and fruit. Near Praia, the crew briefly occupied a Portuguese fort situated on a hilltop but withdrew without securing significant supplies. At Brava, Cape Verde, half the crew of the Hoop ("Hope") contracted fever, including Admiral Jacques Mahu. Following Mahu's death, Simon de Cordes assumed command of the fleet, with Gerrit van Beuningen appointed vice-admiral.

Contrary winds pushed the fleet northeast, off course, and they reached Cape Lopez (in present-day Gabon, Central Africa) in early November. An outbreak of scurvy forced a landing on Annobón in the Gulf of Guinea on 16 December. Around 80 crew members were ill with fever or dysentery, and the sick were put ashore until they recovered. The fleet departed in early January. Starvation severely weakened the crew; some resorted to eating leather.

On 10 March 1599, the fleet reached the Río de la Plata in present-day Argentina. By early April, they arrived at the Strait of Magellan, a passage approximately 570 km in length and 2 km wide at its narrowest point, for which they possessed an inaccurate chart of the seabed. Unfavourable winds persisted for the next four months. In August, the crew went ashore, where, under freezing temperatures and poor visibility, they hunted Magellanic penguins, seals, mussels, petrels, and fish. On 23 August, following three weeks of snow and storms, the weather improved.

== On the Pacific ==
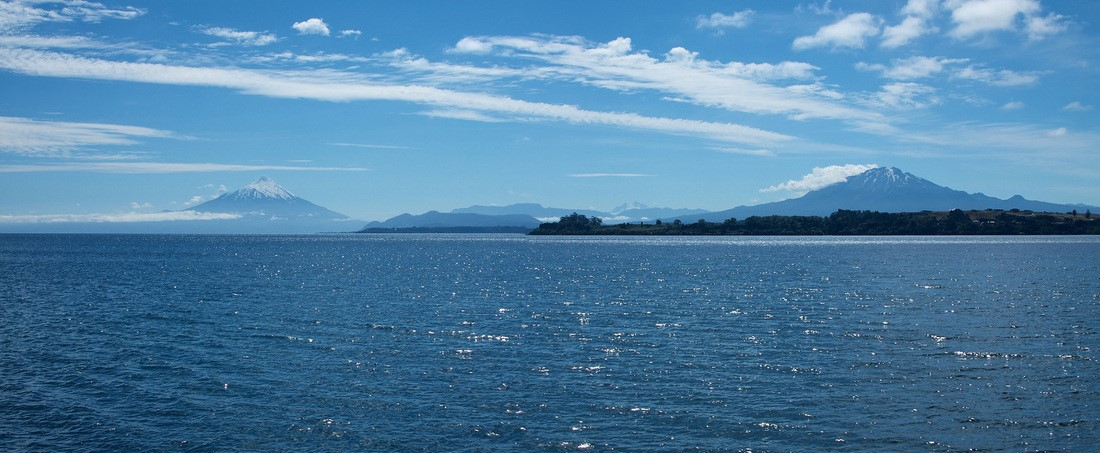
Blue Skies in Chiloe

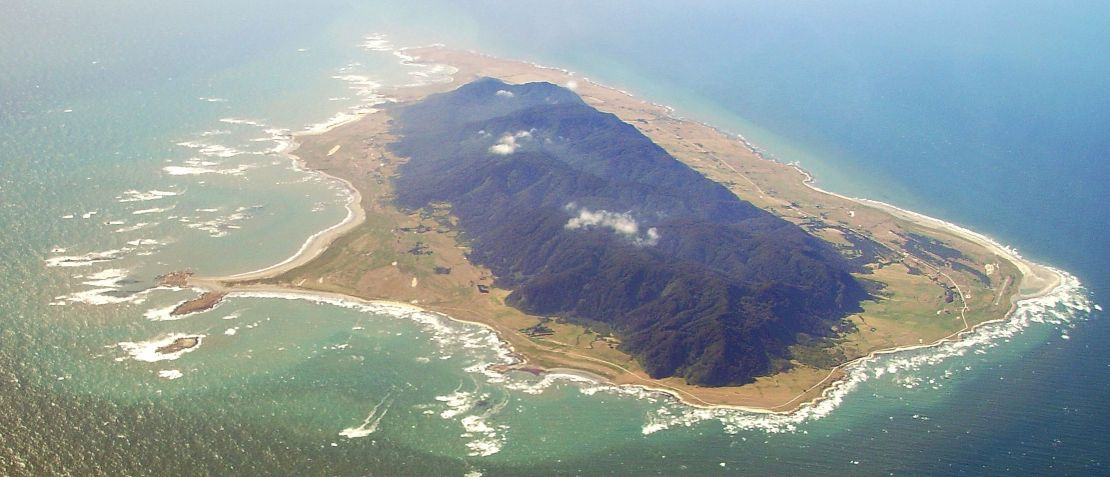
Aerial view of La Mocha

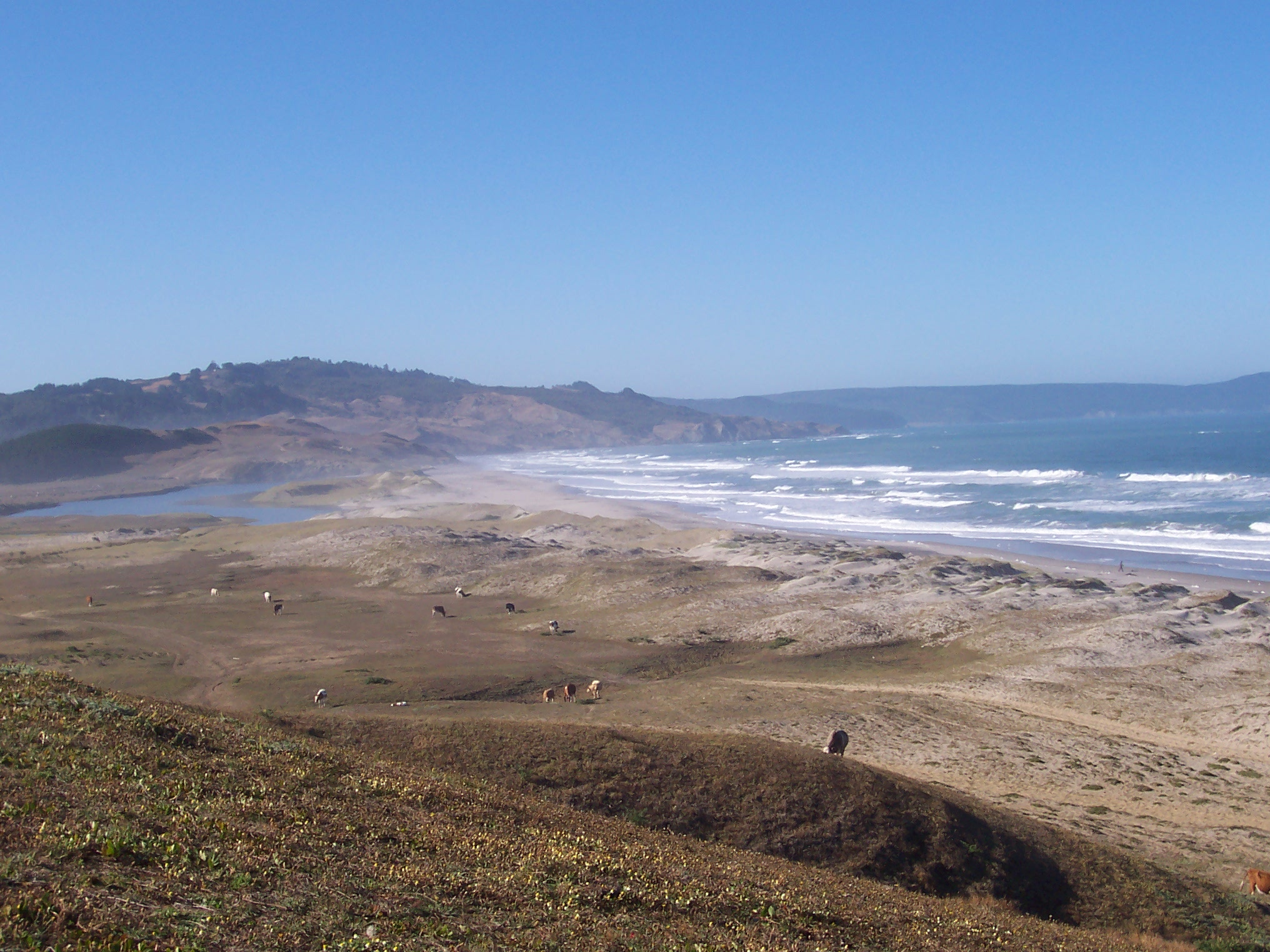
Coast near Punta Lavapie

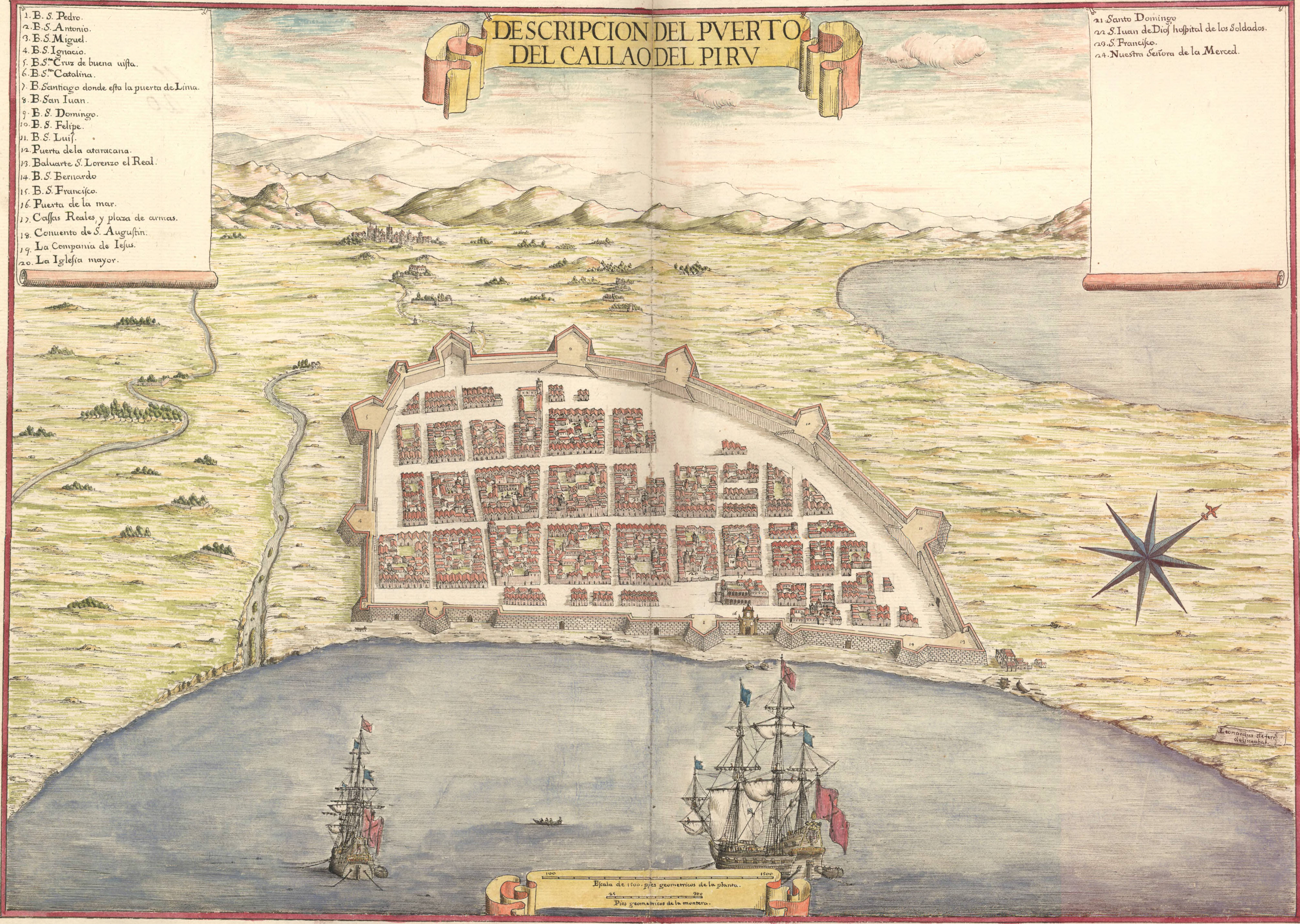
The Spanish stronghold Callao in 1655

When the fleet reached the Pacific Ocean on 3 September 1599, it encountered a storm, and the ships became separated in the fog. On 7 September, the Trouw ("Loyalty") and the Geloof ("Faith") were blown back into the Strait of Magellan and remained together for three months before separating on 11 December. Two weeks later, the expedition of Olivier van Noort arrived, and the Geloof was repaired. On 8 January 1600, Sebald de Weert attempted to depart with Van Noort, but his ships were slower. Around Christmas, the crew of the Geloof grew increasingly discontent due to shortages of bread, wine, and water, and mutiny threatened. At the eastern end of the Strait, De Weert was forced to return to the Netherlands. On 24 January, he discovered the Sebald Islands, now known as the Jason Islands, northwest of the Falkland Islands. After 25 months, the Geloof arrived in Rotterdam, carrying plants and herbs for the botanist Carolus Clusius. The main vessels experienced varied fates:

- Hoop ("Hope"), under Admiral Simon de Cordes, who died on 11 November 1599 on Mocha Island. He was likely succeeded by his son, who spoke Portuguese. The ship was lost while crossing the Pacific.
- Liefde ("Love"), initially commanded by Vice-Admiral Gerrit van Beuningen, who died on 7 November 1599, reportedly at Punta de Lavapié. He was succeeded by Jacob Quaeckernaeck, and the ship reached Japan with William Adams.
- Trouw ("Loyalty"), under Baltazar de Cordes, who died on 5 January 1601 on Tidore.
- Blijde Boodschap ("Good Tiding"), a small yacht commanded by Dirck Gerritsz Pomp, was detained near Valparaíso.

Simon de Cordes ordered his fleet to wait for two months at Santa María Island, Chile, but some ships failed to locate the island due to inaccurate maps. In early November, the Hoop landed on Mocha Island, where 27 crew members were killed by local Araucanians. (Accounts differ: Van Noort's report places Simon de Cordes's death at Punta de Lavapié, whereas Adams records it on Mocha Island.) The Liefde made landfall at the island but continued to Arauco, Chile. A Spanish captain supplied the Trouw and Hoop with food, and the Dutch assisted him against the Araucans, who had killed 23 Dutch crew members, including Gerrit van Beuningen, who was replaced by Jacob Quaeckernaeck.

In March 1600, Baltazar de Cordes, who had succeeded Van Boekhout and lost the Geloof, landed on Chiloé, an island off the coast of Chile. The crew consumed sheep, potatoes, and eggs, and received apples and honey from locals. De Cordes ordered the construction of a small fortification. The Dutch received support from the Cunco or Huilliche people in Lacuy and formed an alliance to seize Castro, participating in the Arauco War against Spanish forces. The Trouw later crossed the Pacific toTidore, arriving on 5 January 1601. The Portuguese promised supplies the next day, but most of the crew—24 people—were killed. The five survivors were captured and taken to Goa.

The Blijde Boodschap, under Dirck Gerritsz Pomp, drifted for several weeks before landing near Valparaíso on 17 November 1599. The detained crew were transported 3,000 km north to Callao, Peru, and interrogated. Pomp, who spoke Portuguese and had previously visited Japan, explained that the expedition intended to trade cloth, beads, and weapons for silver in Japan and then purchase spices in the Moluccas with the silver. He was considered a threat and sent to Panama, then Lisbon. In 1604, Pomp was exchanged for Almirante de Aragon.

After suffering heavy losses in encounters with the Araucans—who likely mistook the Dutch for Spaniards—the Hoop and Liefde departed for Japan on 27 November 1599. The Hoop was lost in a storm, but the Liefde, under Quaeckernaeck and Adams, reached Bungo, Japan, on 19 April 1600 with 24 survivors, only five of whom were able to walk.

On 4 December 1602, a notarial deed was issued to Isaac le Maire, his brother Salomon, Balthasar Coymans (1555–1634), and others, as four ships had not yet returned, authorizing insurers to pay out claims.

== Sources ==
- DE REIS VAN MAHU EN DE CORDES DOOR DE STRAAT VAN MAGALHAES NAAR ZUID-AMERIKA EN JAPAN 1598–1600. SCHEEPSJOURNAAL, RAPPORTEN, BRIEVEN, ZEILAANWIJZINGEN, KAARTEN, ENZ. UITGEGEVEN EN TOEGELICHT door F.C. WIEDER (1923)
- WIJDTLOOPIGH VERHAEL van 't gene de vijf schepen door de Straet Magellana wedervaren door Barent Jansz. Potgieter, chirurgijn (1600) published by Zacharias Heyns
- De Boer, M.G. (1912) Van Oude Voyagiën
- Sluiter, E. (1933) The voyage of Jacques Mahu and Simon de Cordes into the Pacific Ocean, 1598–1600. Thesis/dissertation.
- Burney, J. (2010). "Voyage of Five Ships of Rotterdam, under the command of Jacob Mahu and Simon de Cordes, to the South Sea". In A Chronological History of the Discoveries in the South Sea or Pacific Ocean (Cambridge Library Collection – Maritime Exploration, pp. 186–204). Cambridge: Cambridge University Press. doi:10.1017/CBO9780511783722.013
