= Sebald de Weert =

Flemish captain and vice-admiral Dutch East India Company

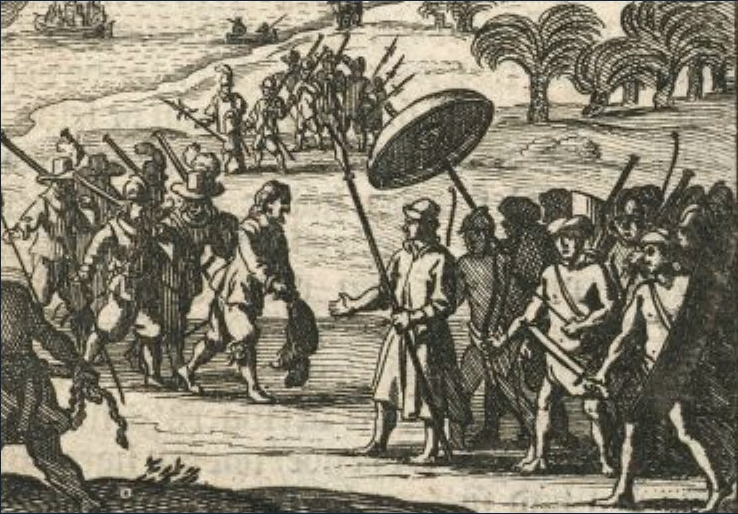
Arrival of Sebald de Weert in Matecalo/Batticaloa

Sebald or Sebald de Weert (May 2, 1567 – May 30 or June 1603) was a Flemish captain and vice-admiral of the Dutch East India Company (known in Dutch as Vereenigde Oost-Indische Compagnie, VOC). He is most widely remembered for accurately plotting the Falkland Islands in 1600.

== Early life ==
Sebald de Weert was born in Antwerp, the sixth of 17 children of Johannes Sweerts de Weert (b. 1538) and Clara Wonderer (1541–1595). The family left Antwerp for Cologne in January 1569, to escape the tyranny and persecution. In 1575, the family moved to Amsterdam. Between 1579 and 1584, they were back in Antwerp, and by 1586, they lived in Middelburg. Sebald was originally employed as a ship's navigator with the Dutch East India Company (VOC), and over the years worked his way up to vice admiral with the VOC. He signed his name "Sebalt", but had the official Latinized name "Sebaldus".

== Expedition to the East Indies via the Straits of Magellan ==
=== Crossing the Atlantic ===
Around 1598, several exploratory expeditions left Rotterdam for eastern discovery traveling in many different routes. On June 27, 1598, a voyage of five ships with 494 men under the command of Jacques Mahu and financed by Dutchman Pieter van den Hagen and the Flemish Johan van der Veken, two wealthy retailers, and equipped by Magelhaanse Compagnie, left Goeree (Holland), bound for the Moluccas, in the Dutch East Indies. They headed Southwest toward the Straits of Magellan in South America, intending to navigate the straits then turn Northwest toward Asia.

The ships with their (initial) captains were: Hoop (Hope), captained by Jacques Mahu, leader of the expedition; Liefde (Love), captained by Simon de Cordes, second-in-command; Geloof (Belief), captained by Gerrit van Beuningen; Trouwe (Faith), captained by Jurriaan van Boekhout; and finally Blijde Boodschap (Good Tiding or The Gospel), captained by Sebald de Weert. The Blijde Boodschap was better known as Vliegend Hart (Flying heart) prior to this particular voyage. Liefde had been previous known as Erasmus and still had a figurehead of the philosopher.

After leaving European waters the ships spent from April 2 to September 29 at the Cape Verde Islands off the coast of Africa. Many of the crew of the Hoop caught fever there, with some of the men dying, among them Admiral Jacques Mahu. He died on September 23, 1598, leaving the expedition without its leader. Simón de Cordes replaced Mahu's command with Gerrit van Beuningen becoming vice-admiral. As such Van Beuningen was moved to the flagship which led to Sebald de Weert moving to relieve van Beuningen of command of the Geloof. Due to an outbreak of scurvy, the vessels made a short diversion from December 16, 1598, to January 2, 1599, to take on supplies in Annobón an African trading island south of São Tomé Island. The flotilla finally crossed the Atlantic in January 1599 and reached the Straits of Magellan on April 7, 1599. Much to their dismay they found they were unable to sail for more than another four months due to strong adverse winds. The fleet wintered in the Fortesene Bay until August 23 and until August 28 in Ridres Bay. During this time around 120 more of the crew died due to the harsh weather and hostile Patagonian natives, even though the ships still had enough provisions at this time.

=== Tough times in dire straits ===
On September 3, 1599, the Pacific was finally reached. The ships ran into more trouble as they were caught in a torrential storm with three of the vessels getting lost from the Geloof and Trouwe, who never lost sight of one another during the storm and both wound up being swept back into the Straits of Magellan. When the Geloof finally lost sight of the Trouwe, Captain De Weert found himself with a restless crew threatening to force a return home to the Netherlands. The Trouwe eventually found shelter from the weather at the Chilean island Chiloe, where several of the crew including the group's new commander, Simón de Cordes, were eventually killed by natives. Those who survived never returned to Europe.

Both the Hoop and the Liefde also met hostile natives, who were most likely mistaken for Spaniards. The natives killed both ships' captains and a large number of crew members. After the ships found one another they decided to head in the direction of Japan rather than the Moluccas. The Hoop was later lost in a vicious storm but the Liefde, commanded by a new captain, Jacob Quaeckernaeck, with a decimated crew, eventually managed to reach Usuki in the province of Bungo on Kyushu Island by April 19, 1600. The men were so physically weakened by the trip that only six of the remaining 24 survivors were able to even walk.

=== The Geloof turns back to the Netherlands ===
Unlike his colleagues on the Liefde, Sebald de Weert's ship never made it to Asia. He encountered the Dutch seafarer Olivier van Noort, who on his ship Mauritius, would later become famous as the first Dutchman and only the fourth sea captain to circumnavigate the world. Van Noort would also be famous from the same journey as being the man who sank the Spanish galleon San Diego in Manila Bay.

Van Noort was still on the first leg of his historic voyage and was also to be on a northwestern track so Sebald de Weert attempted to join forces with the two Van Noort vessels. But de Weert's ship could not keep up due to his crew being physically too weak and van Noort's ships being too fast. Nevertheless, both Van Noort and De Weert were eventually blown back eastward into the straits again where the two captains met for a second time. Having left Rotterdam with four ships Van Noort now had just lost two ships to terrible Straits of Magellan storms yet Van Noort was determined to press on across the Pacific. De Weert on the other hand hoped to strengthen his crew's physical condition prior to making another attempt at the Pacific. As such De Weert planned to sail his ship to the eastern part of the straits to hunt penguins in the "Penguin Islands". His plans did not come to fruition as strong winds blew the ship back east again. De Weert then decided to take his men back home to the Netherlands. On his way back, he sighted and tried to make landfall on the Falkland Islands (see below) in January 1600. The ship passed the equator in March 1600 and visited the Azores on June 6. Upon finally reaching the Netherlands (Goeree) on July 13, 1600, only 36 of the Geloof's original 105 crew members were still alive.

De Weert's original command, the Blijde Boodschap, had been so short on supplies that, in November 1599, they were forced to sail into the Spanish port of Valparaíso in Chile. The Spanish being in the 80-year war with the Dutch, the ship was immediately confiscated and the crew imprisoned for a long period of time. In fact, the captain, Dirck Gerritz Pomp, who had once worked for the Portuguese in Japan and China voyages, was held as long as 1604 when he had finally been released to return home due to a Dutch-Spanish prison exchange.

== Ceylon voyage ==
=== Background ===
Sebald de Weert made at least one other important sea voyage, which would be his last. The Dutch made their first contact with Ceylon in June 1602, in the same year that the Dutch East India Company (V.O.C.) had been established in March. On May 31, Admiral Joris van Spilbergen arrived with three ships after a 12-month voyage. He visited the King of Kandy, Vimaladharmasuriya I in Kandy. The four-month visit was cordial and successful. The timing was right: the Portuguese colonialists had relegated the king to a virtual rebel leader in the inlands. They discussed the possibility that in exchange for Dutch military assistance to expel the Portuguese from the coastal areas, the Dutch would be able to trade cinnamon and pepper from the island. Reflecting the cordiality of the visit, Vimaladharmasuriya started to learn the Dutch language, saying that ‘Kandy is now Flanders’, while Spilbergen left two skilled musicians behind in the King's service.

=== Visit to Kandy ===
De Weert arrived on 28 November 1602, two months after Spilbergen's departure, to follow through on implementing Spilbergen's negotiations. He had official Dutch backing with an offer to help Vimaladharmasuriya's forces. Like Spilbergen he landed at Batticaloa and was escorted on elephants to the city of Kandy. During this visit, it was decided that the Kandy troops and Dutch forces would launch a joint offensive on the Portuguese. On January 14, 1603, accompanied by a Kandy ambassador, De Weert traveled on to Atjeh and returned to Ceylon in April with six ships.

=== Death at Batticaloa ===
En route to or near Batticaloa De Weert's fleet took four passing Portuguese ships, but then a number of events went wrong. In Batticaloa, the Dutch crew had shot several cows. Worse, De Weert released the Portuguese crews who had surrendered to the Dutch on the promise that their lives would be spared. These crews were sent off on two of their ships, while the King had demanded their execution. This greatly upset Vimaladharmasuriya and made him wonder if the Dutch were on the Portuguese side. He refused to inspect or even view the captured Portuguese ships. After heated discussions at a banquet dinner in Batticaloa about their joint forthcoming attack on Galle, De Weert, invited the King to board his ship but the King refused as De Weert had ordered the surrendered Portuguese soldiers not to be executed, against the King's request. The King is to have said that he had to return to Kandy as his Queen was all by herself. Upset with the King's refusal and inebriated during the dinner, De Weert is said to have insulted the Queen by saying, "Your majesty need not worry. The ministers of Candia (Kandy) will look after the Queen." The king ordered him imprisoned, calling out ‘’Bandapan mé balla’’ (“bind that dog”). In the struggle, De Weert had apparently attempted to draw his sword and the King's men, perhaps accidentally, killed De Weert by a blow to the head. The King then ordered the few accompanying officers killed, as well as the 300 men who had come ashore but at the King's request had stayed on the beach. Just a few men who were able to swim to the ships survived. Though not accepting responsibility for the deaths of De Weert and his crew, the King eventually offered his apologies and the VOC sent the merchant Jacob Cornelisz later that year. He was treated well but was not offered the promised merchandise, returning with a letter from the King expressing hope for improved relationships.

De Weert's death dealt a blow to any Kandy-Dutch alliance in Ceylon until the next king, Senarat, succeeded to the Kandyan throne in 1604. Once in power Senarat began again to solicit Dutch support. On 11 March 1612 a new Dutch envoy, Marcellus de Boschouwer, concluded a treaty of alliance with King Senarat. The king granted the Dutch extensive commercial concessions and a harbor for settlement on the east coast in return for a promise of armed assistance against any and all Portuguese attacks. Between 1640 and 1650 the Dutch completely ousted the Portuguese from Ceylon and ruled until 1796 when the British in turn replaced the Dutch and eventually took the whole island, including its holdout interior Kingdom of Kandy.

== Legacy ==
=== Sebald de Weert's “unusual” natives ===
During De Weert's time in the Magellan Straits there were some anthropologically noteworthy events that are associated with him. One instance of which is that De Weert and several crew claimed to have seen members of a “race of giants” while there. De Weert described a particular incident when he was with his men in boats rowing to an island in the Magellan Strait. The Dutch claimed to have seen seven odd-looking boats approaching with were full of naked giants. These giants supposedly had long hair and reddish-brown skin. The Dutch claim to have shot three of the giants dead with their muskets before the giants finally retreated to the shore. On the shore the giants were apparently able to uproot trees from the ground to protect themselves from the musket fire and they waited with spears and stones so they could attack the Dutch intruders should they make a beach head. In fear of the giants, the Dutch dared not land.

De Weert's claims to sightings of giants were not totally unusual for this region as Magellan also first recorded sighting them in 1520 in the straits at San Julian. It was also claimed that Magellan captured two male giants as specimens to return to Europe, but the giants died en route. These creatures were supposedly over three meters tall. Many others including Francis Drake, Pedro Sarmiento, Tome Hernandez, and Anthony Knivet claimed to have seen giants in the Straits of Magellan with the last sighting have been at Cabo Virgines in 1764 by Commodore John “Foul Weather Jack” Byron. De Weert's expedition is the only one to have claimed to have witnessed aggressive behavior on behalf of the giants.

Also according to Theodore de Bry (1528–98) in Part IX of his landmark Historia Americae Sive Novi Orbis (History of American Grand Voyages), Sebald de Weert reported how his crew had captured and imprisoned a Tierra del Fuegan mother with two children on the south side of the Magellan route heading eastward. While they released the mother and the younger child, they carried the older daughter forward to Europe, where she soon died. De Weert noted that the mother had fed the children on raw birds, which was an oddity well noted in de Bry's work.

=== Discovery of the Sebald or Falkland Islands ===
It was on his homeward leg back to the Netherlands after having left the Straits of Magellan that De Weert noticed some unnamed and uncharted islands, at least islands that did not exist on his nautical charts. There he attempted to stop and replenish but was unable to land due to harsh conditions. The islands Sebald de Weert charted were a small group off the northwest coast of the Falkland Islands (Islas Malvinas) and are in fact part of the Falklands. De Weert then named these islands the “Sebald de Weert Islands” and the Falklands as a whole were known as the Sebald Islands until well into the 18th century. In 1766, the British settlers of Saunders Island renamed the small group of the NW that De Weert had plotted Jason Islands and Carcass Island after the vessels Jason and Carcass on which they had arrived. In Spanish these are still known as the "Islas Sebaldes" or "Sebaldinas" for short.

Although Sebald de Weert is usually credited with first sighting the Falklands in 1598, both the Spanish and British claim their own explorers discovered the islands earlier.
