= Blown off course =

Diverted from intended path by unexpected wind

To be blown off course in the sailing ship era meant be to diverted by unexpected winds, getting lost possibly to shipwreck or to a new destination. In the ancient world, this was especially a great danger before the maturation of the Maritime Silk Road in the Early Middle Ages, finding expression in the writing of Cosmas Indicopleustes. Even in later eras, the ship could attempt to limit its divergence by tacking or heaving to, but it was often difficult to keep track by mere celestial navigation before the invention of the marine chronometer in the late 18th century.

A number of "discoveries" during the Age of Discovery were accidentally found in this way, and the serendipity of being blown off course is also a trope in fiction. Accidental discovery may have played a larger role than previously acknowledged in early European colonialism in contrast to the idea of a centrally-planned program as by Prince Henry the Navigator, but it is also thought that the Austronesian expansion was more directed and purposeful than once thought, rather than being the result of accidental drift.

== Historical voyages ==
- 640 BC: Colaeus
- 116 BC: Eudoxus of Cyzicus
- 62 BC: "Indos quosdem", survivors of an Indian shipwreck in Suebi presented to Quintus Caecilius Metellus Celer, as recorded by Cornelius Nepos and Pomponius Mela
- 50: Rhapta
- 412: Faxian
- 986: Bjarni Herjólfsson
- 999: Leif Erikson
- 1312: Lancelotto Malocello
- 1349: Giovanni de' Marignolli
- 1406: Thorstein Olafsson
- 1418: João Gonçalves Zarco and Tristão Vaz Teixeira
- 1488: Bartolomeu Dias
- 1500: 2nd Portuguese India Armada
- 1505: Lourenço de Almeida
- 1525: Gomes de Sequeira
- 1527: Narváez expedition
- 1535: Fray Tomás de Berlanga
- 1543: António Mota
- 1578: Golden Hind
- 1599: Dirck Gerritsz Pomp
- 1609: Sea Venture
- 1615: Eggert Ólafsson
- 1616: Eendracht
- 1620: Mayflower
- 1638: Nuestra Señora de la Concepción
- 1654: Jewish arrival in New Amsterdam
- 1675: Anthony de la Roché
- 1707: Scilly naval disaster
- 1770: First voyage of James Cook
- 1815: Arniston

== Historical states and lost sailors ==
- Lê dynasty in Vietnam
- Sakoku in Japan

== In popular culture ==
- Accidental travel as plot device
- Odyssey
- Aeneid
- A True Story
- Sinbad the Sailor
- The Tempest
- Gulliver's Travels
- Wasobyoe
- "MS. Found in a Bottle"

== See also ==
- Drift migration
- North Korean ghost ships
