= Hoop (East Indiaman) =

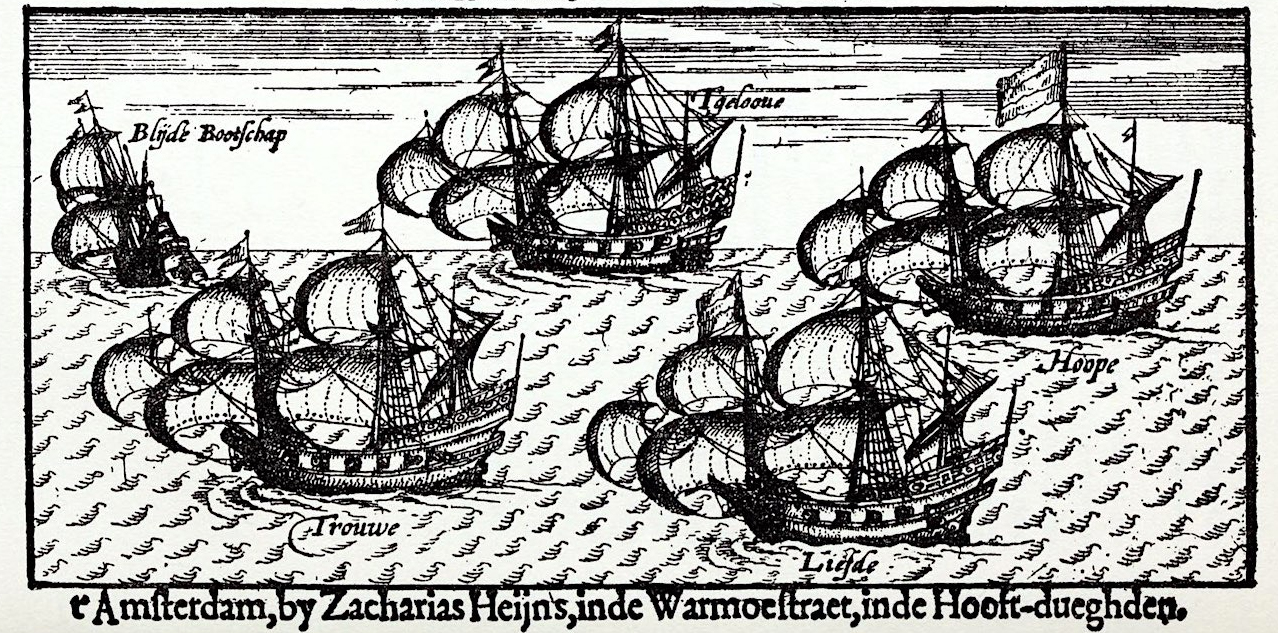
- Hoop.

History
- Name: Hoop
- Owner: Vereenigde Oostindische Compagnie (VOC)
- Port of registry: Dutch Republic
- In service: 1597
- Out of service: 24 September 1600
- Fate: Sank during a storm

General characteristics
- Class & type: VOC type frigate
- Type: Sailing ship
- Tons burthen: 250, or 500 (bm)
- Crew: 120–130

Hoop was a Dutch sailing ship that sank in 1600 during a storm in the Pacific Ocean, while she was travelling from Hawaii to Japan under the command of Admiral Jacques Mahu.

== Owners ==
Hoop was built for the Vereenigde Oostindische Compagnie (VOC) as a frigate, to serve for the Magellaanse Compagnie.

== Expedition to Japan and Sinking ==
On 27 June 1598 Hoop, Blijde Boodschap, Trouw, Geloof, and Liefde left Goeree, The Netherlands for Japan. They had been sent on a risky venture to raid Spanish and Portuguese settlements in Africa and Asia and to return with pepper and other spices from the Moluccas.

In those days a man could earn a fortune with pepper. The German language still knows the expression Pfeffersack - meaning "a bag of pepper" - as a synonym for a very rich man.

Admiral Jacques Mahu died on 23 September 1598 of sickness during the voyage and was replaced by Vice-admiral of the fleet Simon de Cordes, who was killed on the Mocha Island on 11 November 1599 by the locals. Cordes was replaced by Jacob Huydecoper (1568–1600)?

- Blijde Boodschap drifted away to the South and was captured by the Spanish, off Valparaíso, Chile.
- Geloof returned home.
- Trouw was captured off the coast of Chile.

The two remaining ships, Hoop and Liefde, continued to Japan.

After leaving Hawaii for Japan on 24 September 1600 Hoop and Liefde got caught in a storm/ The Hoop and all 130 of its crew drowned, including the new expedition leader Huydecoper, and Captain Kornelisz Jansz Noris. The Liefde was badly damaged, but survived the storm.

Liefde, under command of Captain Jacob Quaeckernaeck, arrived in Usuki Bay, Kyushu, Japan on 19 April 1601 with 24 half-starved men (23 Dutch and one Englishman). Seven of them were so weakened by the journey that they died later, leaving only 17 survivors of the original 100 member crew of the only ship that survived the expedition to Japan. In total 5 ships and about 500 men left Rotterdam in 1598 and only 1 ship and 17 men reached their goal two years later. Liefde continued to serve for the Dutch Navy until her sinking near Japan in 1605.
