= Jacob Elet =

Jacob Elet was a Dutch chief factor for the Dutch West India Company on the Slave Coast of West Africa during the 18th century who is especially known for having visited in 1733 Agaja, the king of Dahomey, and for having kept a diary chronicling the trip.

== Life till 1732 ==
Jacob Elet was born in 's-Hertogenbosch at the end of the seventeenth or the beginning of the 18th century. In 1721 he traveled to the Gold Coast and was employed as an assistant of the Dutch West India Company in Elmina in present-day Ghana.

== Life from 1732 to 1740 ==
In September 1732 Elet was appointed chief factor and head of the Dutch fort Crevecoeur in Accra. When Agaja took three European employees of the company as hostage after an attack on Jakin on April 2, 1732, Elet was sent to the Agaja to negotiate their release and the resumption of the slave trade.

On February 10, 1733, Elet left Elmina and sailed to Jakin, where he left on his trip to Abomey, the capital of Dahomey, on March 20, 1733. He was accompanied on his trip by the head of the Portuguese trading post in Jakin, Antonio de Pinto Carneiro, by another four Europeans and by 84 African porters. Once they arrived, Elet managed to negotiate the release of his three colleagues in exchange for a resumption of the slave trade with the Dahomey at the port of Jakin. However, the latter part of the deal quickly fell apart because the bosses of the company in Amsterdam trusted very much one of their German Chief Merchants, Henry Hertogh, who was located in Appa (which was outside of Dahomey). The Dutch West India Company therefore continued to send all their ships, bar one, to Appa in order for them to be supplied with slaves. Elet knew that the Agaja would be angry at him and pleaded his bosses to send him ships, but to no avail. The Agaja was furious with Elet for not keeping his side of the bargain and destroyed the Dutch trading post in November 1734.

Upon Elet's arrival in Accra he got arrested and charged with embezzlement of funds in the reconstruction of the fort at Jakin and for keeping gifts of the Agaja to himself. The charges however could never be substantiated and Elet was repatriated to Holland in July 1740, after which nothing more is known about him.
