= Wasobyoe =

1774 narrative work by Yukokushi

Ikoku kidan, Wasōbyōe
- Author: Yukokushi
- Translator: Basil Hall Chamberlain
- Language: Japanese
- Genre: Utopian fiction
- Publication date: 1774
- Publication place: Japan
- English publication date: 1879

Wasōbyōe, or Strange Tales of Foreign Lands, also known as The Japanese Gulliver, is a 1774 narrative work by the pseudonymous author Yukokushi. It is a utopian fiction that has been compared to Jonathan Swift's Gulliver's Travels. It was presented in English as a paper read to the Asiatic Society of Japan by Basil Hall Chamberlain in 1879.

The name Wasōbyōe (also the name of the story's protagonist) is derived from that of Zhuang Zhou, wasō meaning Japan and byōe being a Japanese form of Zhuang Zhou's family name. The story promotes Taoist concepts over their Confucian equivalents, and Chamberlain suggested that its parable-like structure was intended to replicate the style of the Zhuangzi.

In the tale, the titular Wasōbyōe sets out by boat from his native Nagasaki on a business trip, but is blown off course by a typhoon. He is shipwrecked in the Land of Perennial Youth, where he lives for 200 years, and he subsequently visits a number of other fictitious countries, including the Land of Idlers, the Land of Shams, the Land of Ancient Customes, the Land of Paradox and the Land of Giants.

Wasōbyōe was popular in its day, and spawned at least two sequels, Wasōbyōe kohen (1779) by Sawai Iro and Wasōbyōe zokuhen (1854) by Kokunen Kocho Sanjin. In 1797 Santō Kyōden wrote a play based on the work, Wasobyoe gojitsu hanashi, and Takizawa Bakin modelled his book Musobyōe kocho monagatori on Yukokushi's tale. An erotic parody, Ikai kikei Oshobobo, appeared in 1776.
