= Dirck Gerritsz Pomp =

Dutch explorer

Dirck Gerritszoon Pomp, alias Dirck China (1544 – c. 1608), was a Dutch sailor of the 16th–17th century, and the first known Dutchman to visit China and Japan. Pomp was born in Enkhuizen in the Burgundian Netherlands. As a youth, he was sent in 1555 to Lisbon to live with relatives who were traders, to learn Portuguese and train as merchant. In 1568 at the age of 22, Pomp established himself as a merchant on the isle of Goa off the coast of India. From there, he visited China and Japan aboard Portuguese trading ships.

Although the date of his first visit is not known, he sailed to Japan twice before 1600. It is recorded that he arrived in Japan on July 31, 1585, for his second visit there, on the Portuguese ship Santa Cruz. He described Japan as the "isle where there is a lot of silver and where Portuguese ships arrive every year with silk, which is sold for silver".

Pomp returned to Enkhuizen in April 1590, where he talked abundantly about Japan. He befriended merchant Jan Huygen van Linschoten, who apparently relied on some of Pomp's information for his book Itinerario (1596).

In the summer of 1598 Pomp went back to sea. He had joined a five-ship Dutch expedition from Rotterdam under admiral Jacques Mahu, with the primary aim of obtaining East Indian spices, by sailing around the southern tip of South America and across the Pacific. Should that fail, the expedition would head for China or Japan for silver trade. Among the adventurers on the expedition were the English navigator William Adams and his brother Thomas. The latter died in a conflict with natives in South America, but in 1600 William Adams became the first known Englishman to reach Japan.

After Jurriaen Boekholt died in April 1599, Pomp was given command of the Blijde Boodschap ("Good Tiding" or "Gospel"). Strong and adverse winds dispersed the fleet when it left the Straits of Magellan. The Blijde Boodschap was blown off her course southwardly. According to the account of Jacob le Maire, Pomp observed mountainous land at latitude (64°). If so, these were the South Shetland Islands, and possibly the first European sighting of (isles off) Antarctica. Other accounts, however, do not note this observation, casting doubt on their accuracy. A similar story is told of the Spanish Gabriel de Castilla in 1603.

The Blijde Boodschap was so short of supplies that it entered the port of Valparaíso (present-day Chile) in mid-November 1599, where it was captured by Spanish colonists, who controlled this territory. The crew were imprisoned. Five years later, in 1604, Pomp was freed in a prisoners exchange and given permission to return to the Netherlands. He sailed in 1606 aboard an Eastindiaman belonging to the Dutch East India Company, but was not recorded as surviving the home voyage.

In 2013, the Netherlands Antarctic research facility was christened Dirck Gerritsz Laboratory, with the four mobile container labs named Geloof (Faith), Hoop (Hope), Liefde (Love) and Blijde Boodschap (translated officially as Annunciation).

== See also ==
- List of Antarctic expeditions
