= Jacques Mahu =

Dutch explorer

Jacob (Jacques) Mahu (1564 – 23 September 1598) was a Dutch merchant and explorer.

In 1598, he led an expedition with five vessels organised by Pieter van der Hagen and Johan van der Veeken intended to find a trade route to the Spice Islands and to incite the local population to rise against the Spanish. The expedition left from Rotterdam on 27 June 1598, but suffered misfortune from the start.

The ships with their (initial) captains were: Hoop (Hope), captained by Jacques Mahu, leader of the expedition; Liefde (Love), captained by Simon de Cordes, second-in-command; Geloof (Faith), captained by Gerrit van Beuningen; Trouwe (Faithful), captained by Jurriaan van Boekhout; and finally Blijde Boodschap (Good Tiding or The Gospel), captained by Sebald de Weert. The Blijde Boodschap was better known as Vliegend Hert (Flying deer) prior to this particular voyage. Liefde had been previous known as Erasmus and still had a figurehead of him.

After leaving European waters the ships spent sailed to the Cape Verde Islands off the coast of Africa, staying there from 2 to 29 September. While there, many of the crew of the Hoop caught fever, some of whom died, including Admiral Jacques Mahu, who died on 23 September 23 1598, leaving the expedition without its leader. The leadership of the expedition was taken over by Simon de Cordes. Blijde Boodschap was captured by the Spanish in South America, Hoop was lost near Hawaii and Trouwe was captured by the Portuguese on Tidore. The Geloof became the first Dutch ship to cross the Pacific and returned to Holland via the Strait of Magellan in July 1600 with only 36 of her original 109 crew. Liefde was wrecked on the coast of Japan with 24 survivors, one of whom, William Adams, remained as a trader and personal advisor to shōgun Tokugawa Ieyasu.
