= List of Arctic expeditions =

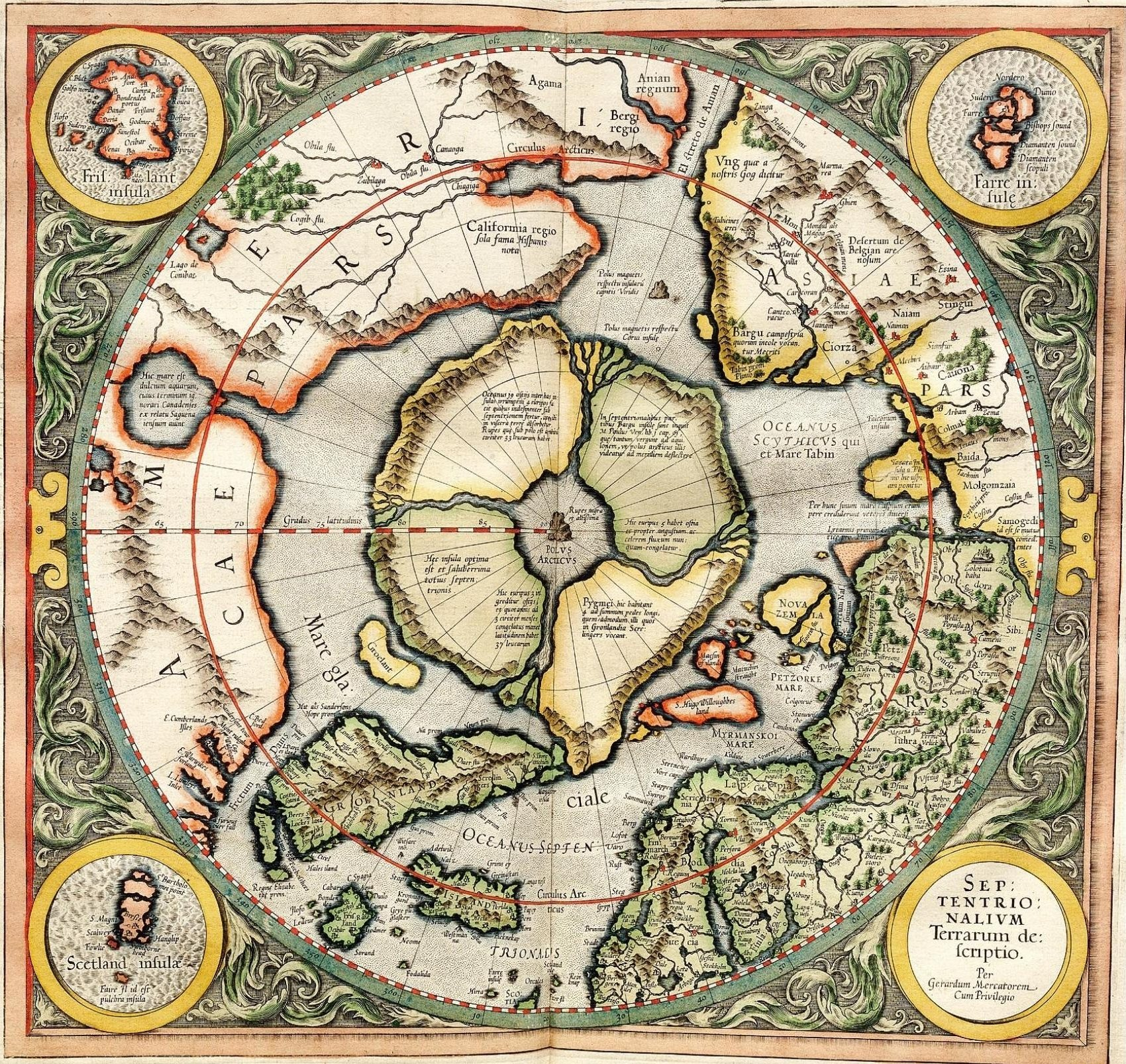
Gerardus Mercator's 1595 map of the Arctic

This is a list of Arctic expeditions.

== 15th century ==
- 1472: Didrik Pining and Hans Pothorst mark the first of the cartographic expeditions to Greenland
- 1496: Grigory Istoma, venturing out of the White Sea, travels along the Murman Coast and the coast of northern Norway

== 16th century ==
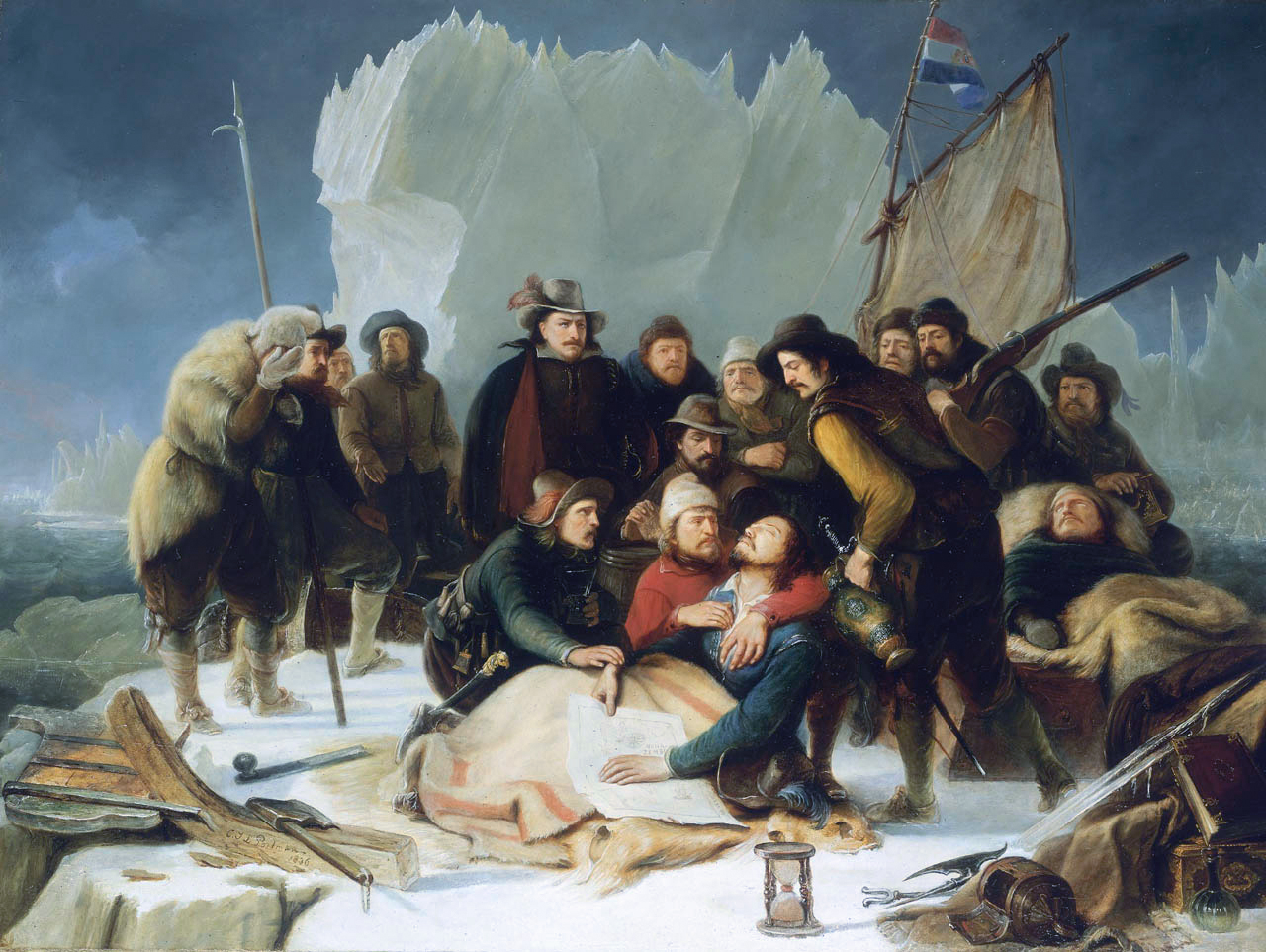
The death of Willem Barentsz

- 1553: English expedition led by Hugh Willoughby with Richard Chancellor as second in command searches for the Northeast Passage
- 1557: English expedition led by Stephen Borough reaches the Kara Strait
- 1576–1578: English expeditions led by Martin Frobisher reach Baffin Island
- 1579: Danish-Norwegian expedition led by James Alday fails to reach Greenland due to ice
- 1580: English expedition led by Arthur Pet and Charles Jackman reaches the Kara Sea
- 1581: Danish-Norwegian expedition led by Magnus Heinason fails to reach Greenland due to ice
- 1585–1587: English expeditions led by John Davis explore the Davis Strait–Baffin Bay region and reach Upernavik
- 1594: Dutch expedition led by Willem Barentsz, Cornelis Nay and Brandt Tetgales reaches the Kara Sea via Yugorsky Strait
- 1595: Dutch expedition led by Cornelis Nay fails to make further progress towards a Northeast Passage than in the previous year
- 1596–1597: Dutch expedition piloted by Willem Barentsz discovers Spitsbergen and registered the first recorded Farthest North

== 17th century ==
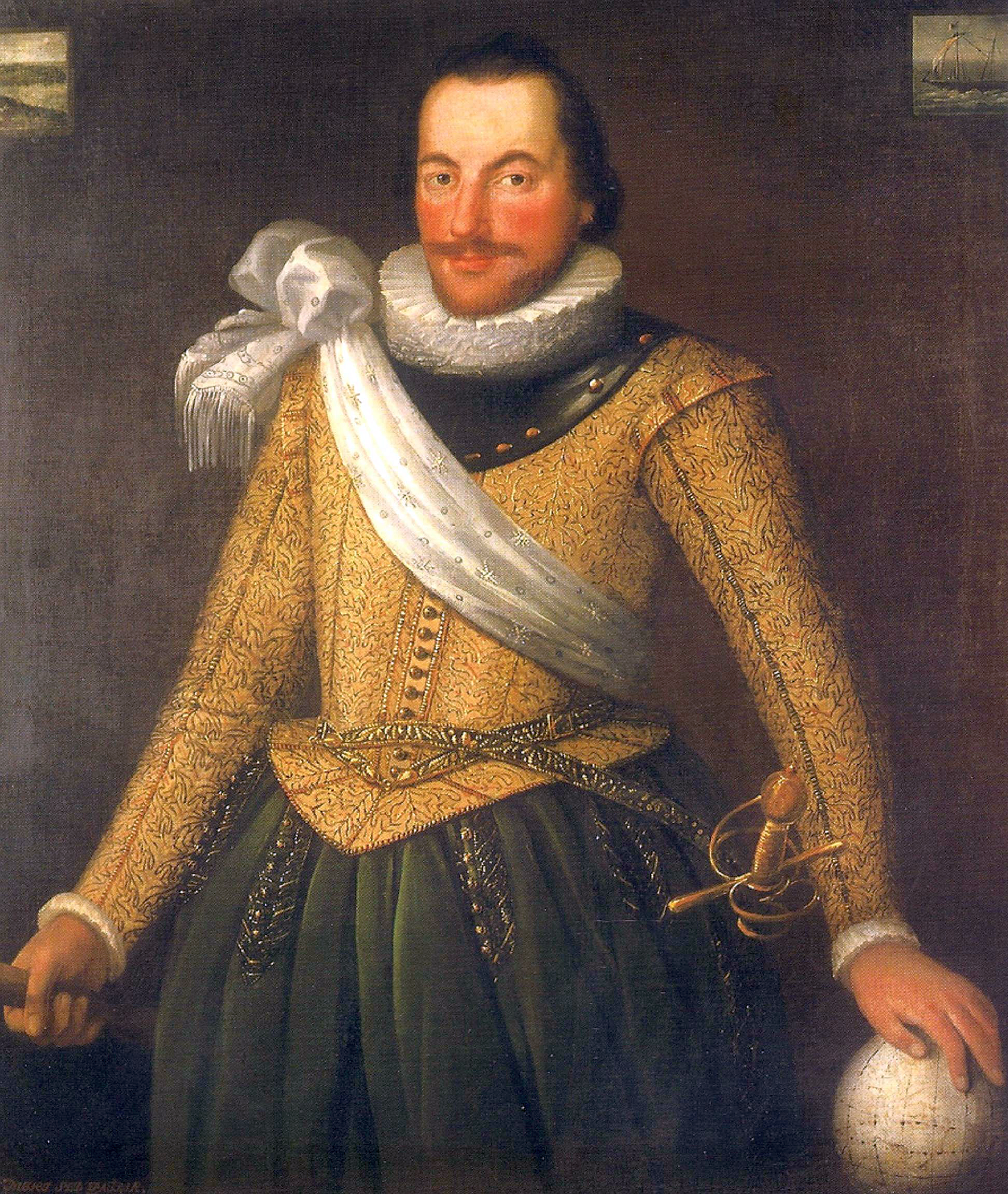
Thomas Button

- 1605–1607: Danish-Norwegian king, Christian IV of Denmark, sends three expeditions led by John Cunningham, Godske Lindenov and Carsten Richardson (all piloted by James Hall), to search for the lost Eastern Settlement, one of the Norse colonies on Greenland
- 1606: John Knight, who had captained the Katten in 1605 with John Cunningham, dies commanding a joint Muscovy Company/East India Company expedition in search of the Northwest Passage
- 1607: Henry Hudson explores Spitsbergen
- 1608: Henry Hudson gets as far as Novaya Zemlya in his attempt to find the Northeast Passage
- 1609: another unsuccessful attempt by Henry Hudson at finding the Northeast Passage
- 1610: Jonas Poole thoroughly explores Spitsbergen's west coast, reporting that he saw a "great store of whales"; this report leads to the establishment of the English whaling trade
- 1610: Russian Kondratiy Kurochkin explores the mouth of the Yenisei River and the adjoining coast
- 1610–1611: Henry Hudson reaches Hudson Bay in an attempt to find the Northwest Passage
- 1612: James Hall and William Baffin explore southwest Greenland
- 1612–1613: Button expedition, commanded by Thomas Button, in search of the Northwest Passage
- 1613: Several whaling expeditions, consisting of a total of at least thirty ships from England, France, Spain, and the Netherlands crowd Spitsbergen's west coast
- 1614: Dutch and French expeditions discover Jan Mayen
- 1615: Robert Fotherby, in the pinnace Richard, is the first English expedition to reach Jan Mayen
- 1615: English expedition captained by Robert Bylot and piloted by William Baffin reaches the Foxe Basin in search of the Northwest Passage
- 1616: English expedition captained by Robert Bylot and piloted by William Baffin explores the Davis Strait–Baffin Bay region
- 1619–1620: Danish-Norwegian expedition led by Jens Munk in Enhiørningen (Unicorn) and Lamprenen (Lamprey) to discover the Northwest Passage penetrated Davis Strait as far north as 69°, found Frobisher Bay, spent a winter in Hudson Bay
- 1633–1634: I. Rebrov explores the mouth of the Lena River
- 1633–1635: Ilya Perfilyev explores the Lena and Yana Rivers and intervening coast
- 1638: I. Rebrov explores coast between the Lena and Indigirka Rivers
- 1641: Dimitry Zyryan and Mikhail Stadukhin explore the mouth of the Indigirka River and adjoining coast
- 1646: I. Ignatyev explores the mouth of the Kolyma River and adjoining coast
- 1648: Ya. Semyonov explores the mouth of Kotuy River and adjoining coast
- 1648: Semyon Dezhnev and Fedot Alekseyevich Popov explore from the Kolyma River through the Bering Strait
- 1649: Mikhail Stadukhin explores the coast from the Kolyma River to the Bering Strait
- 1676: English expedition led by John Wood fails to find the Northeast Passage
- 1686–1687: Ivan Tolstoukhov expedition explores the mouth of the Yenisey River and the coast of the Taymyr Peninsula

== 18th century ==
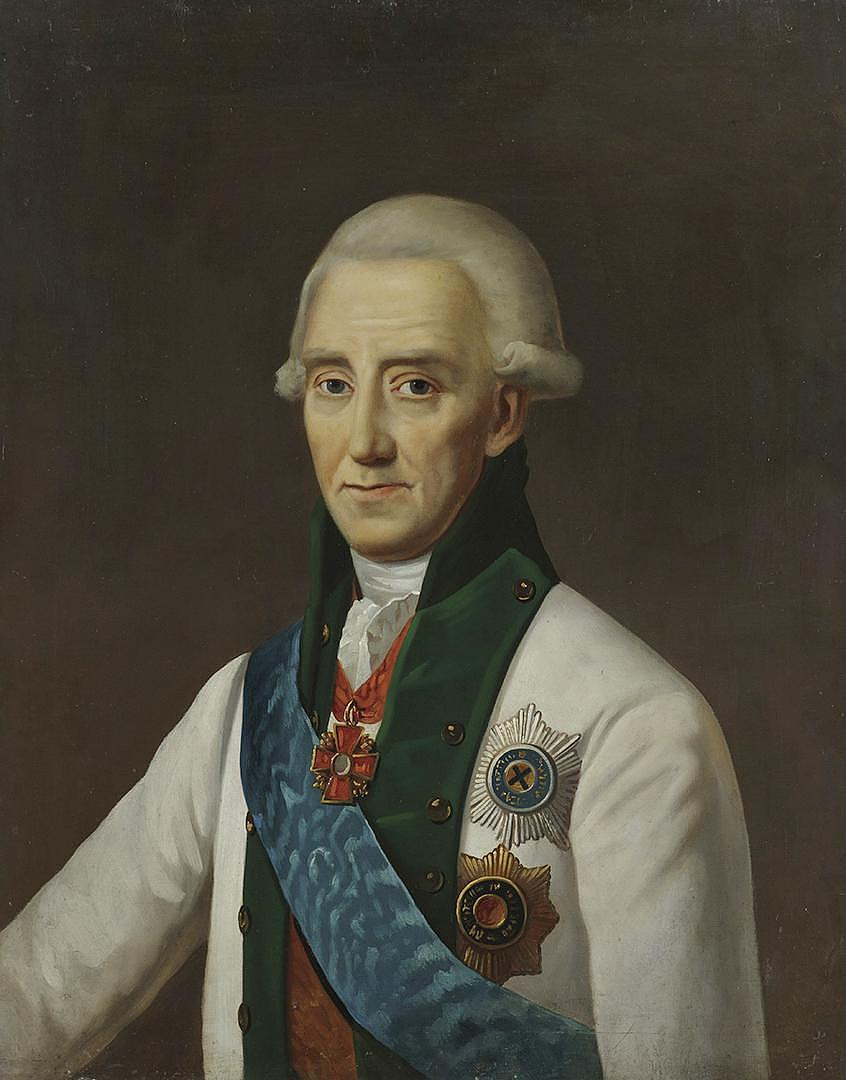
Vasily Chichagov

- 1712: Merkury Vagin and Yakov Permyakov explore the vicinity of the mouth of the Yana River and adjoining coasts, both were murdered by mutineering expedition members
- 1725–1730: Vitus Bering leads the First Kamchatka expedition
- 1728: Claus Paarss attempts to cross Greenland's interior from the west in search of the old Norse Eastern Settlement
- 1733–1743: Second Kamchatka expedition explores the north coast of Russia and discovers Alaska
- 1751: Lars Dalager attempts to find the lost Eastern Settlement by crossing Greenland's ice sheet from the west
- 1751–1753: Peder Olsen Walløe explores the east coast of Greenland from Cape Farewell in umiaks
- 1760–1763: S. F. Loshkin explores Novaya Zemlya
- 1765–1766: Vasily Chichagov explores the Kola Peninsula coast and Spitzbergen
- 1768–1769: F. F. Rozmyslov explores Novaya Zemlya and the Matochkin Strait
- 1770–1771: Samuel Hearne traces the Coppermine River to the Arctic Ocean
- 1773: Ivan Lyakhov discovered Kotelny Island
- 1773: The Phipps expedition towards the North Pole reaches 80° 37′ N, north of Spitsbergen. This was the first Arctic expedition to carry out scientific research.
- 1776–1780: James Cook charts the northwestern coast of America and sails through the Bering Strait during his third voyage in search of the Northwest Passage
- 1785–1794: Russian expedition led by Joseph Billings explores Eastern Siberia, the Aleutian Islands, and the west coast of Alaska
- 1789: Alexander Mackenzie traces the Mackenzie River to the Arctic Ocean

== 19th century ==
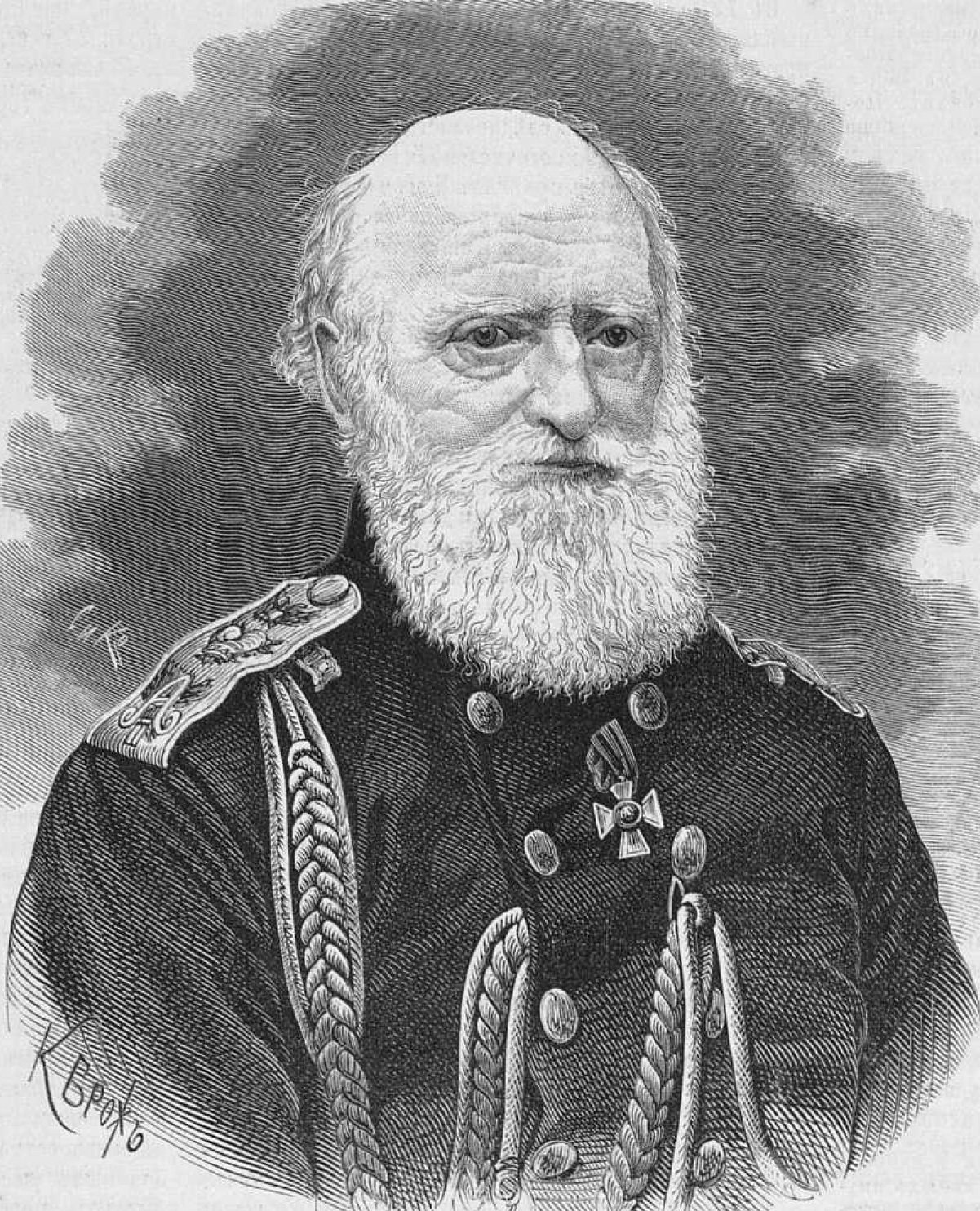
Ferdinand von Wrangel

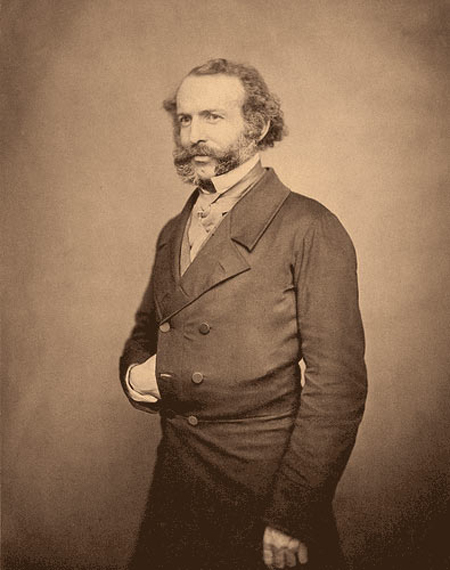
John Rae

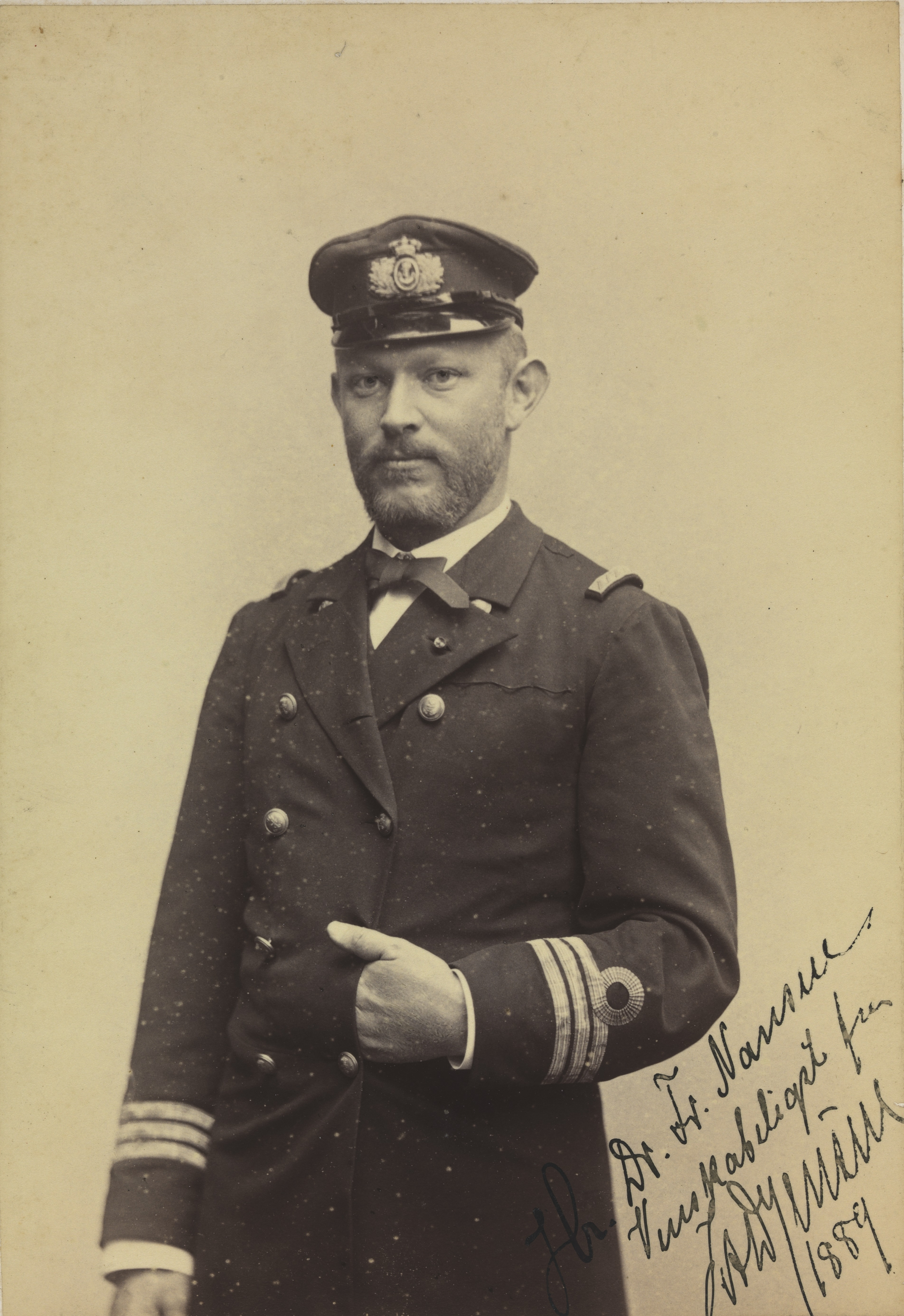
J. A. D. Jensen

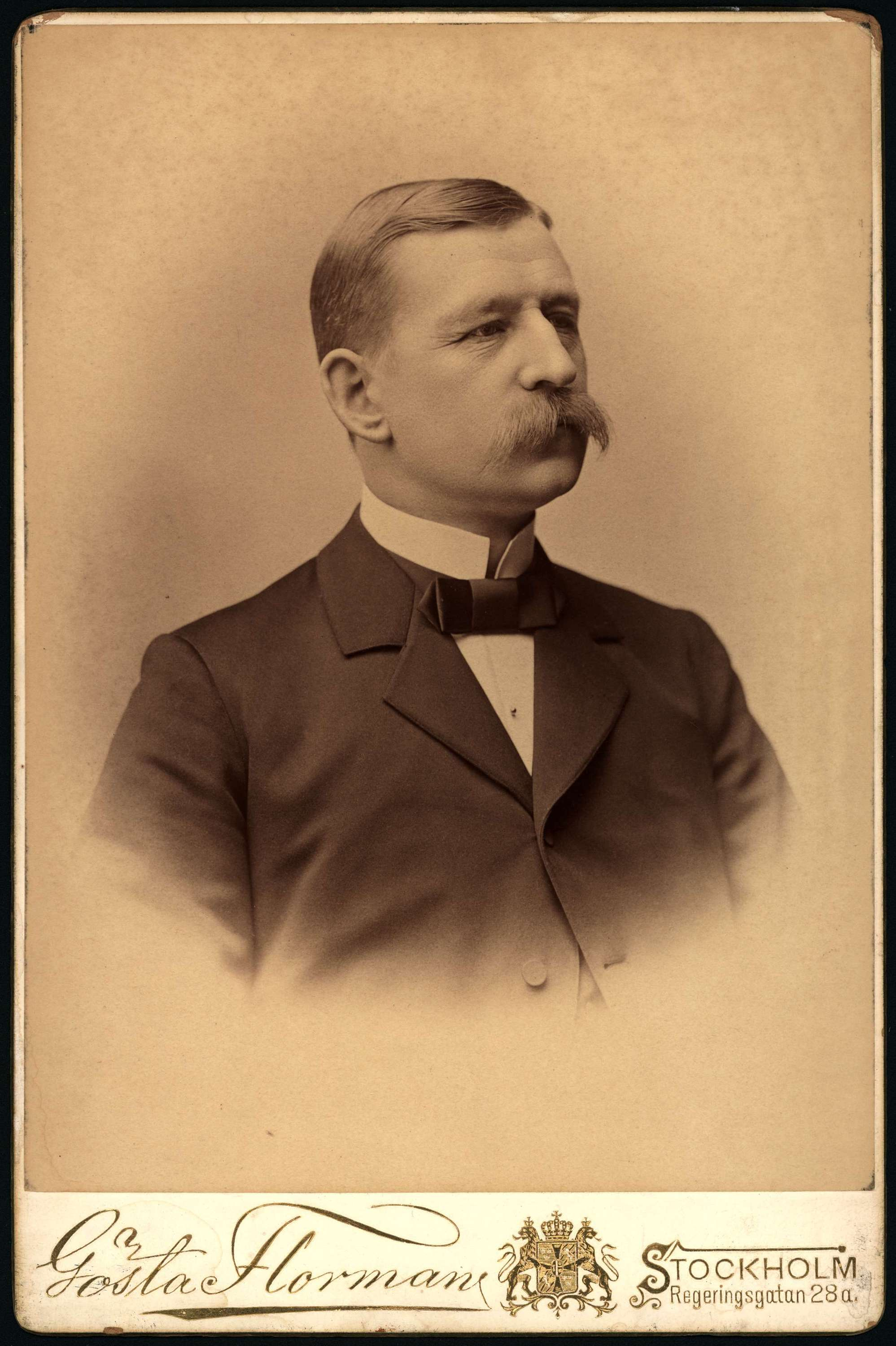
Salomon August Andrée

=== Early Period (1800–1818) ===
- 1800: Yakov Sannikov charts Stolbovoy Island
- 1809–1811: Yakov Sannikov and Matvei Gedenschtrom explore the New Siberian Islands
- 1815–1818: Otto von Kotzebue explores the Bering Strait during the Rurik expedition

=== Ross, Parry and Franklin (1818–1846) ===
- 1818: Royal Navy expedition led by captain David Buchan sails north from Spitsbergen
- 1818: Royal Navy expedition led by John Ross with his nephew James Clark Ross, sails north along the west coast of Greenland to Pituffik in search of the Northwest Passage and encounters the Inughuit (Greenlandic Inuit) of Cape York
- 1819: Royal Navy expedition aboard HMS Hecla and HMS Griper led by William Edward Parry in search of the Northwest Passage
- 1819–1822: The Coppermine expedition in northern Canada, led by John Franklin, includes George Back and John Richardson

==== 1820s ====
- 1820–1824: Ferdinand von Wrangel and Fyodor Matyushkin explore the East Siberian Sea and the Chukchi Sea areas
- 1821–1824: Fyodor Litke explores the eastern Barents Sea and the west coast of Novaya Zemlya, including Matochkin Strait
- 1821–1823: Pyotr Anjou continues exploration of New Siberian Islands
- 1822: William Scoresby lands in east Greenland near the mouth of the fjord system that would later be named for him – Scoresby Sound
- 1823: Douglas Clavering and Edward Sabine explore East Greenland northwards to Clavering Island, where they get in contact with the now extinct Inuit of Northeast Greenland
- 1825–1827: The Mackenzie River expedition descends the Mackenzie River and maps much of the Arctic coast
- 1826: Frederick William Beechey aboard HMS Blossom explores the Alaskan coast from Point Barrow to the Bering Strait
- 1827: First Norwegian expedition to the Arctic, led by Baltazar Mathias Keilhau
- 1827: Royal Navy expedition to Spitsbergen led by William Edward Parry reaches 82°45′ N
- 1828–1830: Danish expedition led by Wilhelm August Graah tries to locate the Eastern Settlement in southeast Greenland, but does not reach Ammassalik Island.
- 1829–1833: Royal Navy expedition led by John Ross to search for the Northwest Passage explores James Ross Strait and King William Land, locates the North Magnetic Pole

==== 1830s and 1840s ====
- 1832–1835: Pyotr Pakhtusov explores the southern half of the eastern coast of Novaya Zemlya
- 1833–1835: Royal Navy expedition led by George Back from Fort Reliance to the mouth of the Back River at Chantrey Inlet
- 1836: George Back attempts to ascertain if Boothia Peninsula is an island or a peninsula but his ship, HMS Terror, is trapped by ice near Southampton Island
- 1837: Karl Ernst von Baer leads a natural history expedition to Novaya Zemlya
- 1838–1839: Avgust Tsivolko leads an expedition to Novaya Zemlya, primarily for surveying
- 1838–1840: La Recherche expedition, under the command of Joseph Paul Gaimard, a scientific venture to explore the islands in the North Atlantic
- 1845: Franklin's Northwest Passage expedition is sent to map the remaining Northwest Passage

=== Search for Franklin (1846–1857) ===
- 1848: John Richardson and John Rae lead the Rae–Richardson Arctic expedition and search overland for Franklin's lost expedition
- 1849: Henry Kellett discovers Herald Island searching for Franklin's lost expedition
- 1850–1854: McClure Arctic expedition led by Robert McClure, a British search for the members of Franklin's lost expedition
- 1850–1851: First Grinnell expedition led by Edwin De Haven, the first American search for the members of Franklin's lost expedition, finds the graves of crew members John Torrington, William Braine and John Hartnell on Beechey Island
- 1851: William Kennedy leads a search expedition for Franklin in the Prince Albert, sponsored by Lady Franklin
- 1852: Edward Augustus Inglefield sets out to search for Franklin's ill-fated expedition in the Isabel, also sponsored by Jane Franklin
- 1853–1855: Second Grinnell expedition led by Elisha Kane looks for Franklin searching Grinnell Land
- 1857–1859: McClintock Arctic expedition led by Francis Leopold McClintock is the fifth expedition sponsored by Lady Franklin and finds artefacts, a crew member's skeleton and the final written communications from the last survivors of the Franklin expedition

=== Nordenskiöld Period (1857–1879) ===
- 1858: Swedish expedition to Spitsbergen led by Otto Martin Torell

==== 1860s ====
- 1860: Paul A. Chadbourne, a Williams College professor, conducts the Williams College Lyceum of Natural History expedition to Greenland.
- 1860–1861: American Arctic Expedition led by Isaac Israel Hayes who claims to see the Open Polar Sea
- 1860–1862: First expedition led by American Charles Francis Hall searching for Franklin
- 1861: Swedish expedition to Svalbard led by Otto Martin Torell explores Hinlopen Strait and the north coast of Nordaustlandet
- 1861–1862: Otto Paul von Krusenstern's expedition through the Kara Sea on the Yermak
- 1864: Swedish expedition to Svalbard led by Adolf Erik Nordenskiöld
- 1864–1869: Charles Francis Hall leads his second expedition to determine the fate of Franklin, to King William Island
- 1867: Edward Whymper and Robert Brown attempt to explore the inland ice of Greenland
- 1868: First German North Polar Expedition led by Carl Koldewey along the east coast of Greenland
- 1868: Swedish expedition led by Adolf Erik Nordenskiöld attempts farthest north from Svalbard
- 1869–1870: Second German North Polar Expedition (Germania and Hansa) led by Carl Koldewey reaches Sabine Island

==== 1870s ====
- 1870 Adolf Erik Nordenskiöld leads a short journey on the inland ice of Western Greenland
- 1871: Benjamin Leigh Smith's first expedition explores the northeastern boundary of Svalbard
- 1871–1873: Polaris expedition, known for the death of its commander, Charles Francis Hall
- 1872: Benjamin Leigh Smith returns to Svalbard in his second expedition
- 1872–1873: Swedish expedition to Svalbard led by Adolf Erik Nordenskiöld winters at Mosselbukta
- 1872–1874: Austro-Hungarian North Pole expedition led by Captain Karl Weyprecht discovers Franz Josef Land
- 1873: Benjamin Leigh Smith comes to Nordenskiöld's aid in Spitsbergen
- 1875: Adolf Erik Nordenskiöld is the first to reach the Yenisey by sea
- 1875–1876: British Arctic Expedition led by Captain George Nares
- 1876: Adolf Erik Nordenskiöld repeats his voyage to the Yenisey
- 1876–1878: Norwegian Northern Seas expedition in Vøringen explored the Northern Atlantic up to 80°N
- 1877–1878: Henry W. Howgate leads the Howgate Preliminary Polar Expedition to promote scientific experiments, and whaling as a source of revenue
- 1878: J. A. D. Jensen explores the inland ice sheet from west Greenland
- 1878–1881: different voyages with Dutch polar schooner Willem Barents in the area around Spitsbergen and Novaya Zemlya, organised by the Royal Dutch Geographical Society
- 1878–1879: Swedish Vega expedition led by Adolf Erik Nordenskiöld completes the Northeast Passage

=== Race for the Pole (1879–1900) ===
- 1879–1882: Jeannette expedition commanded by George W. De Long attempts to reach the North Pole by sea from the Bering Strait
- 1880: Henry W. Howgate leads the Howgate Arctic expedition for scientific and geographical exploration of Greenland
- 1880: Benjamin Leigh Smith's fourth expedition explores the southwestern area of Franz Josef Land
- 1881–1882: Benjamin Leigh Smith's final expedition is shipwrecked in Franz Josef Land

==== International Polar Year ====
- 1881–1884: Lady Franklin Bay Expedition, US Army Signal Corps expedition led by Adolphus Greely
- 1882–1883: The Danish Dijmphna expedition travels to the territory between Russia and the North Pole
- 1883–1885: Umiak expedition, led by Gustav Frederik Holm and Thomas Vilhelm Garde along the southeastern coast of Greenland in the shallow waters between the coast and the sea ice
- 1883: Failed attempt by Adolf Erik Nordenskiöld to cross Greenland from the west
- 1886: Failed attempt by Robert Peary to cross Greenland
- 1888–1889: First successful crossing of the Greenland inland ice by the Norwegian expedition led by Fridtjof Nansen (from east to west)

==== 1890s ====
- 1891–1892: The East Greenland expedition on the Hekla led by Carl Ryder fails to get through the sea ice of east Greenland, but explores the Scoresby Sound system in detail
- 1891–1892: Second Peary expedition to Greenland led by Peary to discover if Greenland is an island or a peninsula
- 1892: Björling–Kallstenius Expedition led by Alfred Björling was eventually wrecked on the Carey Islands
- 1893–1895: Third US Greenland expedition led by Peary
- 1893–1896: Nansen's Fram expedition by Fridtjof Nansen and Hjalmar Johansen on the Fram and over ice towards the North Pole
- 1894 Failed attempt by Walter Wellman to reach the North Pole from Svalbard
- 1894–1897: Jackson–Harmsworth expedition, led by Frederick George Jackson, explores Franz Josef Land hoping in vain to find more land polewards
- 1895-1896: Ingolf expedition, hydrographical and biological studies in the waters around Greenland, Iceland and Jan Mayen
- 1897: Salomon August Andrée leads a failed three man Arctic balloon expedition in an attempt to reach the Pole, Andrée along with Knut Frænkel and Nils Strindberg die
- 1898–1899: Failed attempt by Walter Wellman to reach the North Pole from Franz Josef Land
- 1898–1902: Second Fram voyage by Otto Sverdrup explores the North American Arctic around Ellesmere Island
- 1898-1902: Peary's Sixth Expedition and first attempt at the North Pole
- 1898–1900: The Carlsbergfund expedition to East Greenland led by Georg Carl Amdrup explores the Blosseville Coast
- 1899: Alfred Gabriel Nathorst explores the fjords of northeast Greenland, in particular the King Oscar Fjord system
- 1898–1902: The Swedish–Russian Arc-of-Meridian Expedition measures a meridian arc in Svalbard throughout five summer seasons and one winter season
- 1899–1900: Italian North Pole expedition led by Prince Luigi Amedeo, Duke of the Abruzzi on the renamed Stella Polare captained by Umberto Cagni

== 20th century ==
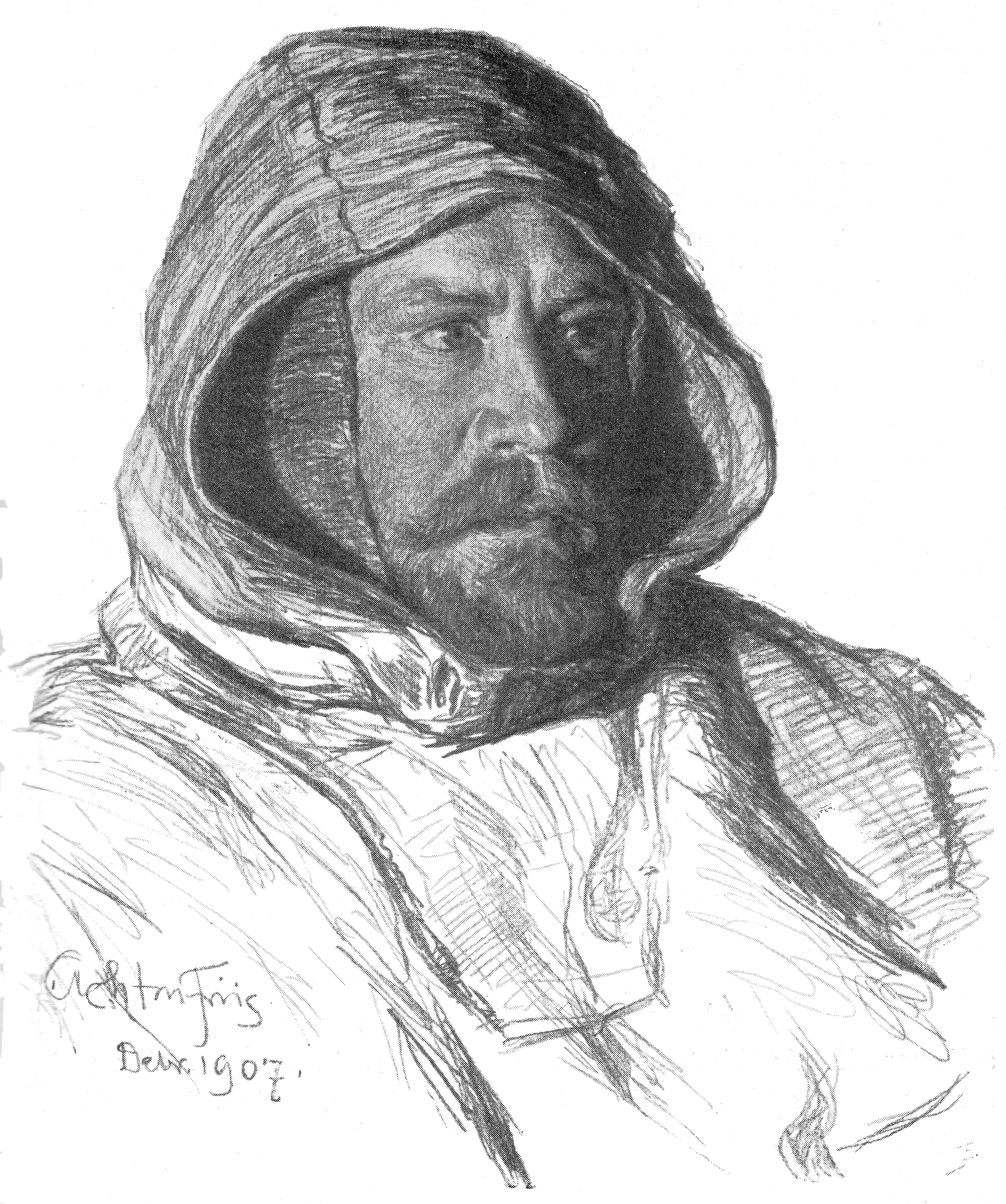
Johan Peter Koch

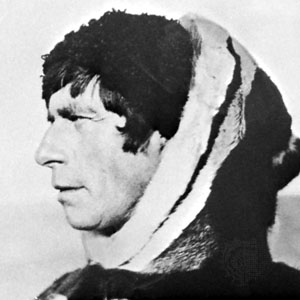
Knud Rasmussen

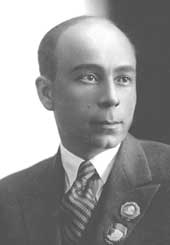
Georgy Ushakov

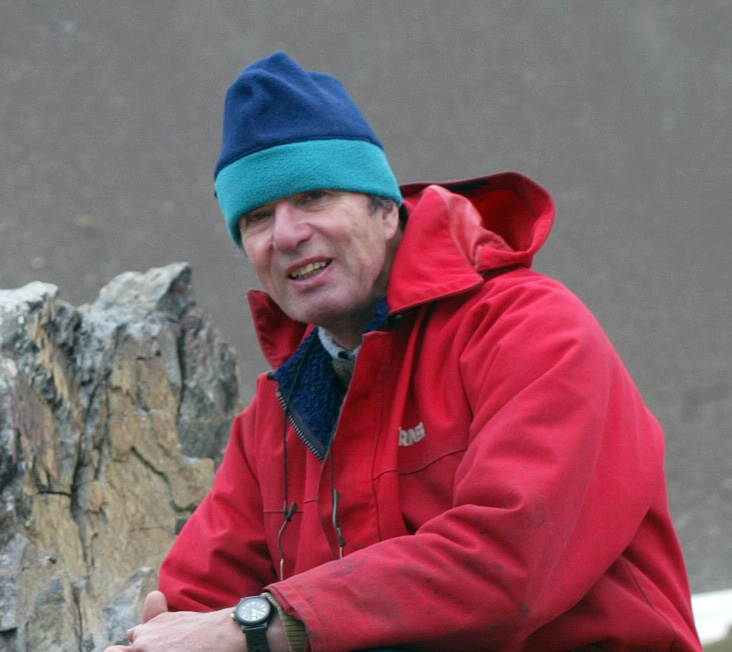
David Scott Cowper

=== Amundsen and the Heroic Age (1900–1925) ===
- 1898, 1899, 1906, 1907: Albert I, Prince of Monaco leads four Arctic expeditions with Princesse Alice
- 1900–1903: Russian polar expedition of 1900–1902 on-board Zarya is led by Eduard Toll
- 1901–1902: Baldwin-Ziegler Polar Expedition financed by US industrialist William Ziegler, led by Evelyn Baldwin
- 1902–1904: The Literary expedition led by Ludvig Mylius-Erichsen together with Knud Rasmussen explores the northwest Greenland coast between Uummannaq and Thule
- 1903–1906: Roald Amundsen's Gjøa expedition – first Northwest Passage traversal
- 1903–1905: Ziegler Polar Expedition overland, led by Anthony Fiala
- 1905–1906: North Pole expedition led by Robert Peary, from Ellesmere Island
- 1906–1908: The Danmark Expedition led by Ludvig Mylius-Erichsen, mapped the last unknown areas of Northeast Greenland, but ended fatally for the main exploring team
- 1906, 1907, 1909: The airship America and Walter Wellman
- 1906–1908: Anglo-American Polar expedition (Ejnar Mikkelsen–Ernest de Koven Leffingwell expedition)
- 1907: Johan Peter Koch and Aage Bertelsen report seeing Fata Morgana Land, a phantom island off the coast of northeast Greenland

==== Disputed Polar Claims ====
- 1907–1909: US North Pole expedition led by Frederick Cook claims to be the first to reach the pole
- 1908: expedition led by Charles Bénard explores Novaya Zemlya
- 1908–1909: expedition led by Robert Peary also claims reaching the North Pole first
- 1909–1912: The Alabama expedition to northeast Greenland led by Ejnar Mikkelsen in an operation to recover bodies and logs of the ill-fated Danmark expedition
- 1910–1915: Russian Arctic Ocean Hydrographic Expedition in Taymyr and Vaygach
- 1912: First Thule expedition – Knud Rasmussen and Peter Freuchen explores North Greenland and establishes that Peary Land is not an island
- 1912: Swiss expedition led by Alfred de Quervain crosses Greenland by dog-sled
- 1912: German Arctic Expedition to Spitsbergen, led by Herbert Schröder-Stranz
- 1912–1913: Danish Expedition to Queen Louise Land – Johan Peter Koch and Alfred Wegener cross the inland ice in north Greenland
- 1912–1914: Brusilov Expedition, ill-fated expedition led by Captain Georgy Brusilov
- 1912–1914: Russian expedition aboard Foka, led by Georgy Sedov
- 1913: Crocker Land Expedition to search for Crocker Island, a hoax reported by Robert Peary
- 1913–1918: Canadian Arctic Expedition 1913–1916 led by Vilhjalmur Stefansson, initially in HMCS Karluk which was lost in 1913 and explored land that was unknown to the Inuit
- 1916–1918: Second Thule expedition – Knud Rasmussen and Lauge Koch explore North Greenland
- 1918–1925: Roald Amundsen traverses the Northeast Passage with Maud
- 1919: Third Thule expedition – Knud Rasmussen explores north Greenland and lays out depots for Roald Amundsen's polar drift in Maud
- 1919–1920: Fourth Thule expedition – Knud Rasmussen explores east Greenland
- 1921:Oxford University Spitsbergen expedition led by F. C. R. Jourdain
- 1921–1923: Bicentenary Jubilee expedition led by Lauge Koch explores north Greenland
- 1921–1923: Wrangel Island Expedition – a land claim and colonisation attempt conceived, but not led by Vilhjalmur Stefansson – all members die apart from Iñupiat seamstress and cook Ada Blackjack
- 1921–1924: Fifth Thule expedition led by Knud Rasmussen crossing the Northwest Passage on dog sledges from Thule across Arctic Canada to Nome, Alaska demonstrates how Inuit culture could spread rapidly
- 1924: Oxford University Arctic Expedition led by George Binney, uses a seaplane to assist in the first traverse of Nordaustlandet

=== Byrd and the Aircraft Age (1925–1958) ===
- 1925: Flying boat expedition led by Roald Amundsen and Lincoln Ellsworth
- 1926: Aircraft flight by Richard E. Byrd and Floyd Bennett

==== Polar Conquest ====
- 1926: The airship Norge (Roald Amundsen, Umberto Nobile and Lincoln Ellsworth) becomes the first verified trip to the North Pole
- 1928: Carl Ben Eielson–Hubert Wilkins Arctic Ocean crossing
- 1928: The airship Italia (Umberto Nobile); airship crashed, but Nobile was rescued
- 1928: Roald Amundsen disappears in the Arctic aboard a Latham 47 while searching for Nobile
- 1928: Marion expedition to Davis Strait and Baffin Bay
- 1930–1931: Alfred Wegener's German Greenland Expedition that led to his death on the Greenland ice sheet, halfway between Eismitte and West Camp
- 1930: Bratvaag Expedition, led by Gunnar Horn to Franz Josef Land, found long lost remains of Salomon August Andrée's expedition
- 1930–1931: British Arctic Air Route Expedition was an expedition, led by Gino Watkins, that aimed to draw improved maps and charts of poorly surveyed sections of Greenland's coastline
- 1931: Successful research trip by airship Graf Zeppelin led by Hugo Eckener
- 1931: Sir Hubert Wilkins with submarine Nautilus (failed 800 km (500 mi) south of the pole)
- 1931: Sixth Thule expedition led by Knud Rasmussen explores northeast Greenland
- 1931: Arne Høygaard and Martin Mehren cross Greenland by dog-sled
- 1931–1934: The three-year expedition to East Greenland led by Lauge Koch explores northeast Greenland

==== Second International Polar Year ====
- 1932: Icebreaker A. Sibiryakov makes the successful crossing of the Northern Sea Route in a single navigation without wintering
- 1932: NSIU Expedition to East Greenland, Eirik Raudes Land, led by the Norwegian Hallvard Devold
- 1932–1933: East Greenland expedition, also known as the Pan Am expedition, a four-man expedition to continue the work of the British Arctic Air Route Expedition
- 1932–1933: Dalstroy expedition to the Kolyma River in a convoy headed by the icebreaker Fyodor Litke
- 1933: Russian steamship SS Chelyuskin managed to get through most of the Northern Route before it was caught in the ice in September
- 1934: British Trans-Greenland Expedition led by Martin Lindsay
- 1935: Ushakov Island, the last piece of undiscovered territory in the Soviet Arctic, was found by Georgy Ushakov aboard the Sadko
- 1935: French expedition led by Paul-Émile Victor crosses Greenland by dog-sled
- 1937: Soviet aircraft Tupolev ANT-25 made several transpolar flights
- 1937: Soviet and Russian manned drifting ice stations are, as of 2025, 43 scientific drift stations operating or were operating on drift ice
- 1937–1938: German Spitsbergen Expedition led by Dr. Herbert Rieche
- 1937–1938: MacGregor Arctic Expedition was led by Clifford J. MacGregor and overwintered at Etah, Greenland
- 1938: Fieseler Storch Expedition led by Ernst Herrmann, first expedition to film the arctic in color
- 1938: Cambridge Spitsbergen Expedition led by L.H.McCabe
- 1938–1939: Mørkefjord expedition was an exploratory expedition to northeast Greenland led by Eigil Knuth

==== Post-War ====
- 1946: Operation Nanook was a US cartographic mission to Thule and to erect a radio and weather station
- 1948: Russian scientific expedition led by Aleksandr Kuznetsov lands an aircraft at Pole
- 1952–1954: British North Greenland expedition was a British scientific mission, led by Commander James Simpson
- 1955: Cross-polar flight by Louise Arner Boyd

=== Era of Satellites, Submarines and Icebreakers (1958–onward) ===
- 1958: USS Nautilus (SSN-571) crosses the Arctic Ocean from the Pacific to the Atlantic beneath the polar sea ice, reaching the North Pole on 3 August 1958
- 1959: Discoverer 1, a prototype with no camera, is the first satellite in polar orbit
- 1959: USS Skate (SSN-578) becomes first submarine to surface at the North Pole on 17 March 1959
- 1960: TIROS-1, is the first weather satellite in polar orbit; eventually returned 22,952 cloud cover photos
- 1968: Ralph Plaisted and three others reach the North Pole by snowmobile and are the first confirmed overland conquest of the Pole
- 1968–1969: Wally Herbert, British explorer, reaches Pole on foot and traverses the Arctic Ocean
- 1971: Former football player Tony Dauksza becomes the first person to traverse the Northwest Passage in a canoe
- 1977: Arktika, nuclear-powered icebreaker, reaches the North Pole
- 1979–1982: Kenichi Horie in Mermaid, was the first person to sail the Northwest Passage solo
- 1982: As part of the Transglobe Expedition Sir Ranulph Fiennes and Charles R. Burton cross the Arctic Ocean in a single season
- 1986: Will Steger and party reach the north pole by dog sled without resupply
- 1986–1989: David Scott Cowper became the first person to have completed the Northwest Passage single-handed as part of a circumnavigation of the world
- 1988: Will Steger completes first south–north traverse of Greenland
- 1988: Soviet–Canadian 1988 Polar Bridge Expedition a group of thirteen Russian and Canadian skiers set out from Siberia skiing to Canada over the North Pole aided by satellites.
- 1989: Arved Fuchs and Reinhold Messner are the first to reach the South Pole and cross Antarctica (1,750 miles route) with neither animal nor motorised help
- 1991–1992: Lonnie Dupre completes first west to east winter crossing of arctic Canada traveling by dog team from Prudhoe Bay, Alaska via the northwest passage before turning south ending in Churchill, Manitoba. The 3000-mile journey started in October and ended in April.
- 1992: Crossing of the Greenland inland ice from east to west by a Japanese expedition led by Kenji Yoshikawa
- 1993–1994: Pam Flowers dog sledded alone 2,500 mi (4,000 km) from Barrow, Alaska, to Repulse Bay (Naujaat), Canada
- 1994: Shane Lundgren led expedition that began in Moscow and proceeded north of the Arctic Circle across Siberia to Magadan
- 1995: Marek Kamiński and Wojciech Moskal reached the North Pole on 23 May 1995 (27 December 1995, Marek Kamiński reached the South Pole alone)
- 1994-1997: Kenji Yoshikawa set sail 43ft ketch sailboat from Japan to Alaska spending polar nights alone with boat for sub sea permafrost research)
- 1997: Børge Ousland completed the first unsupported solo crossing of the Antarctic
- 1997–1998: Year-long Surface Heat Budget of the Arctic Ocean (SHEBA) expedition on a drifting station in the pack ice of the Arctic Ocean

== 21st century ==
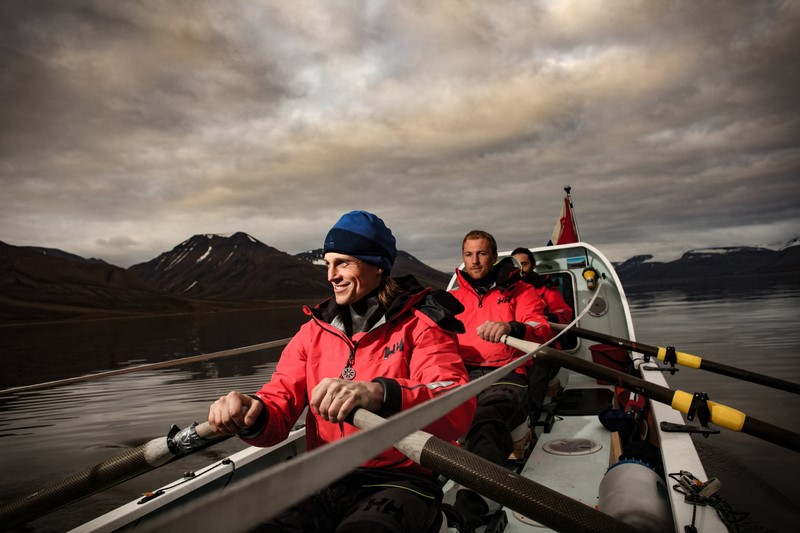
Fiann Paul, Alex Gregory and Carlo Facchino ocean rowing aboard Polar Row.

- 2000: Ukrainian parachute expedition to the North Pole
- 2001: Lonnie Dupre with teammate John Holescher complete the first circumnavigation of Greenland, a 6,500 mile, all non-motorized journey by kayak and dog team.
- 2002: Jean Lemire and the crew of the Sedna IV successfully navigate the Northwest Passage on a three-mast schooner, sailing from Montreal to Vancouver in five months while filming La grande traversée and four other documentaries about the effects of global warming on the Canadian Arctic Archipelago (at the time, only the seventh sailboat in history to make the legendary Northwest Passage from east to west)
- 2003: Pen Hadow makes solo trek from Canada to North Pole without resupply
- 2004: Five members of the Ice Warrior Project reach the Geomagnetic North Pole, including the first two women in history to do so.
- 2006: Start of the French Tara expedition
- 2007: Arktika 2007, Russian submersible descends to the ocean floor below the North Pole from the Akademik Fyodorov
- 2007: Top Gear: Polar Special, BBC's Top Gear team are the first to reach the magnetic North Pole in a car
- 2007: The Arctic Mars Analog Svalbard Expedition uses Mars analog sites on Svalbard for testing of science questions and payload instruments onboard Mars missions
- 2008: Alex Hibbert and George Bullard complete the Tiso Trans Greenland expedition. The longest fully unsupported land Arctic journey in history at 1,374 mi (2,211 km)
- 2009: David Scott Cowper becomes the only person to have sailed the Northwest Passage solo in a single season.
- 2011: MLAE-2011 led by Vasily Igorevich Yelagin travelled from Dudinka, Russia – North Pole – Resolute, Nunavut, Canada
- 2011: Old Pulteney Row To The Pole, a publicity stunt sponsored by Old Pulteney whisky, organised by Jock Wishart who also operated the Polar Race
- 2015: Interdisciplinary Arctic Expedition "Kartesh" – complex arctic expedition, organized by the Polar Expedition Gallery project (later rebranded as Polar Expedition "Kartesh") in collaboration with the LMSU Marine Research Center. Research tasks: assessing the Arctic coastline vulnerability towards human impact; marine and coastal ecosystem and Arctic seas landform condition monitoring; West Arctic biodiversity research; oil oxidizing microorganism activity research; testing new methods of water areas remote sensing.
- 2017: Polar Row, led by Fiann Paul, is the world's most record-breaking expedition (14 Guinness World Records). The team covered 1440 miles measured in a straight line in the Arctic Ocean open waters in a row boat and pioneered ocean rowing routes from Tromsø to Longyearbyen, from Longyearbyen to Arctic Ice Pack (79º55'500 N) and from the Arctic ice pack to Jan Mayen.
- 2019: MOSAiC Expedition under the direction of the Alfred Wegener Institute for Polar and Marine Research with 300 scientists from 20 nations on board the German ice-breaker Polarstern to collect data about the ocean, the ice, the atmosphere and life in the Arctic in order to understand climate change
- 2025: CONTRASTS Expedition with 51 scientists from 14 nations on board Polarstern to compare the evolution of Arctic sea ice of different ages across Greenland and Svalbard during the melt season

== See also ==
- List of Antarctic expeditions
- List of firsts at the Geographic North Pole
