= Kallstenius =

Kallstenius is a surname of Swedish origin. People with that name include:

- Edvin Kallstenius (1881–1967), Swedish composer and librarian
- Gerda Roosval-Kallstenius (1864–1939), Swedish painter; wife of Gottfrid
- Gottfrid Kallstenius (1861–1943), Swedish painter; husband of Gerda

== See also ==
- Björling–Kallstenius Expedition, an 1892 Swedish expedition which failed to reach the North Pole
