= Gerda Roosval-Kallstenius =

Swedish artist (1864–1939)

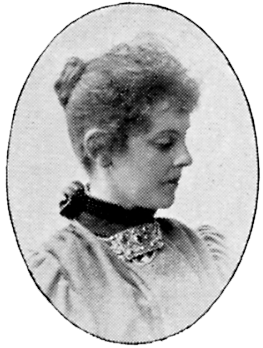
Gerda Roosval-Kallstenius (Svenskt Porträttgalleri XX)

Gerda Roosval-Kallstenius (10 February 1864, Kalmar – 21 August 1939, Västervik) was a Swedish painter who specialized in landscapes and scenes with figures.

== Life and career ==
She was the daughter of businessman John Roosval and Johanna Kramer. Her father's family produced several notables in the world of the creative arts, including her maternal uncles, the art historian Johnny Roosval and early filmmaker Albin Roosval.

Roosval-Kallstenius grew up in Kalmar and was sent to Montreux after completing her girls' school, where she deepened her French skills and gained artistic inspiration. After returning to Kalmar in June 1881, she was taught drawing and painting by Christine Sundberg, one of the first women to study at the Royal Swedish Academy of Fine Arts. In 1884, Roosval-Kallstenius moved to Stockholm to study at the Technical School (now Konstfack) until 1885. At this time she received guidance in painting from Ferdinand Stoopendaal. These preparatory studies eventually resulted in her being admitted to the Academy of Fine Arts in the autumn of 1886.

In 1891 she married fellow painter Gottfrid Kallstenius. Their son, Evald Kallstenius, also became an artist.

After her husband received a scholarship, they went to Paris and settled at the Swedish art colony at Grez-sur-Loing. While there, she continued her training with Raphaël Collin. After traveling to Italy, the couple returned to Sweden in 1896.

== Death ==
She died on 21 August 1939 in Västervik. Her work is held by the major museums of Sweden, such as the Nationalmuseum in Stockholm the Kalmar Konstmuseum and the Östergötlands museum.

== Picture gallery ==
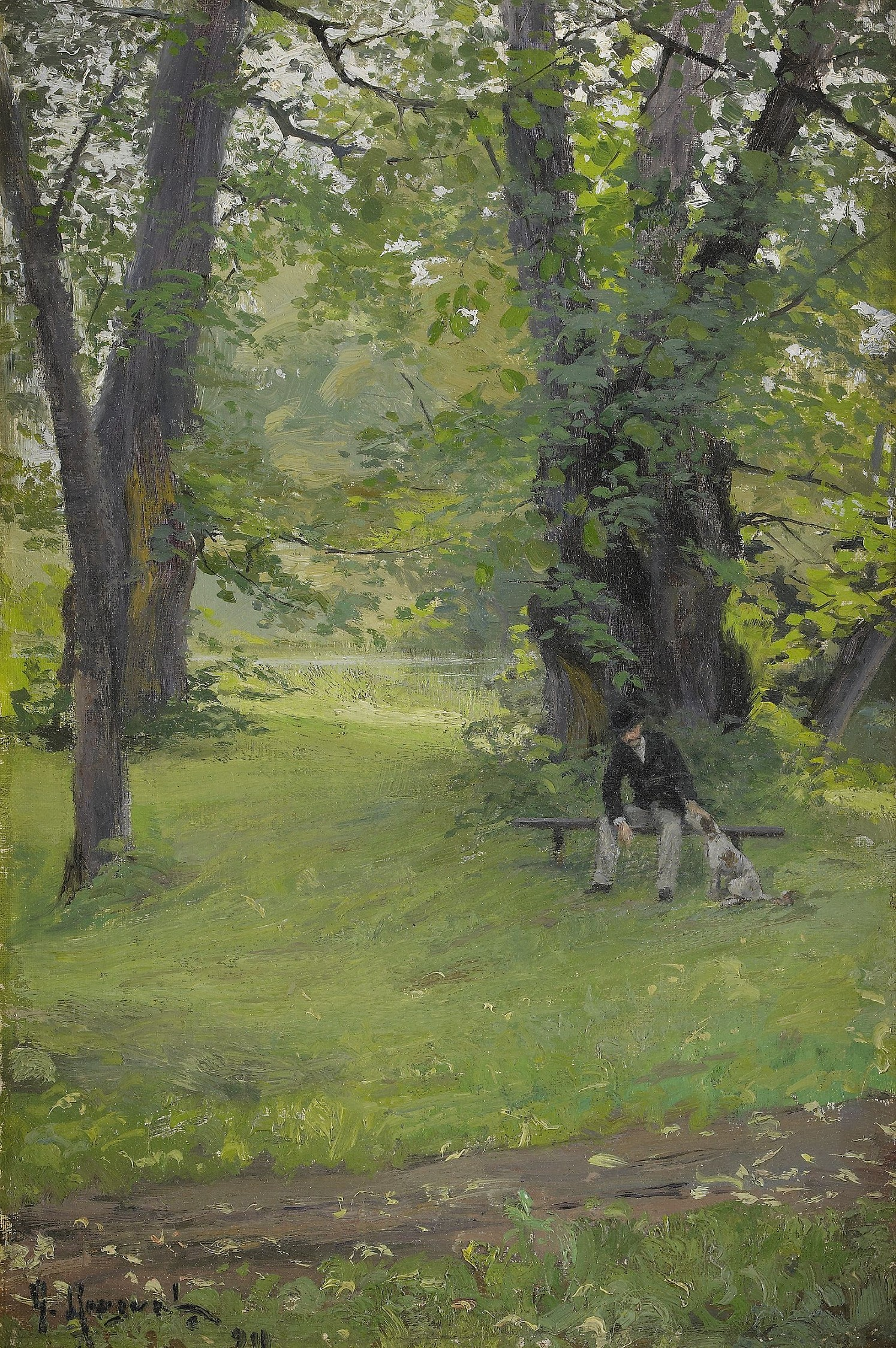
Parkland with Sitting Man and Dog (1890)

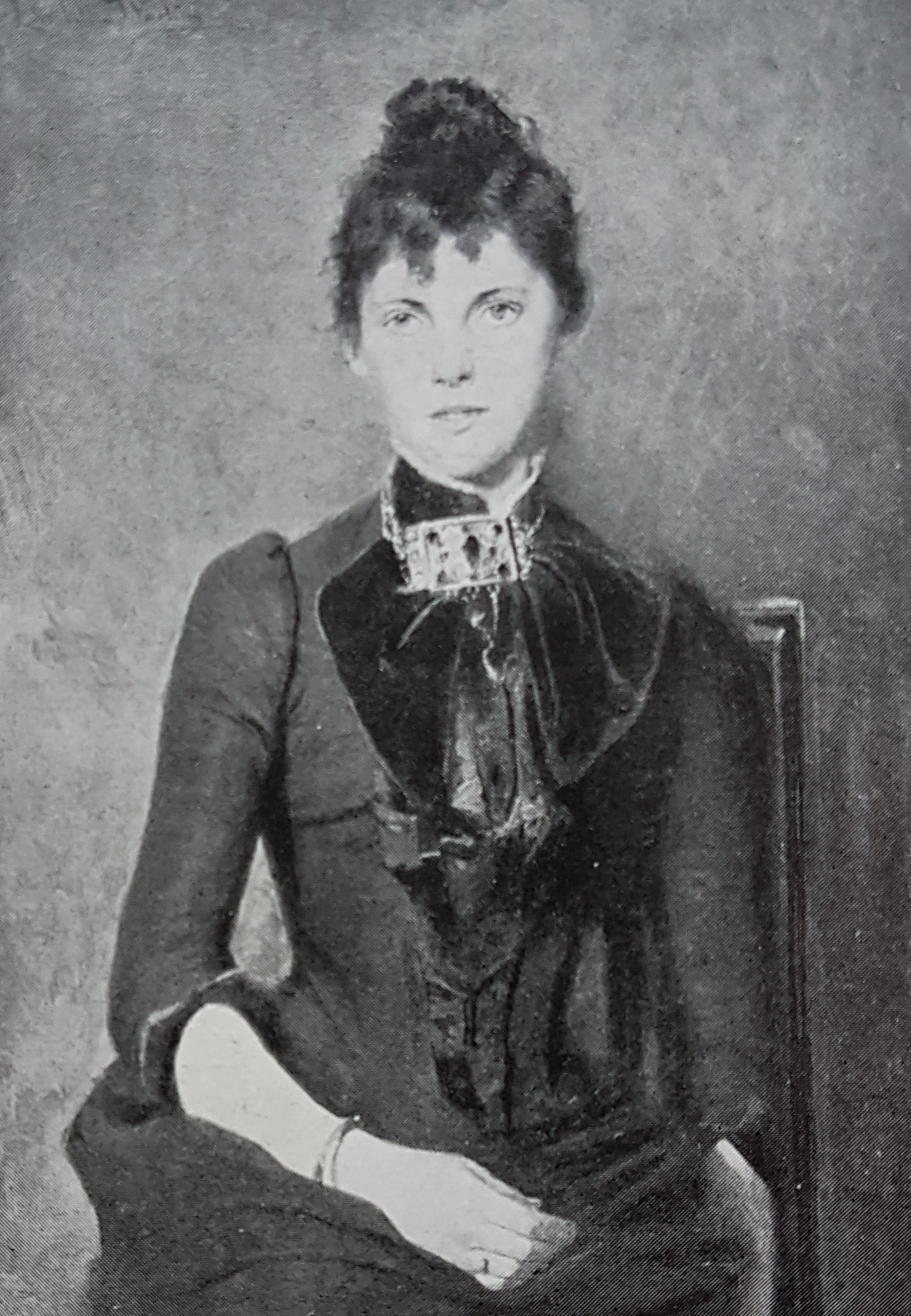
Portrait of Mrs K. (performed by Elisabeth Warling)

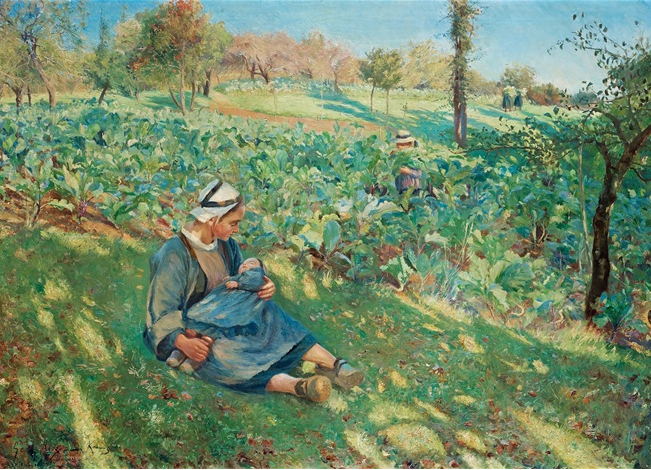
Summer Day - Cold Weather (Le Pouldu, Bretagne 1891)

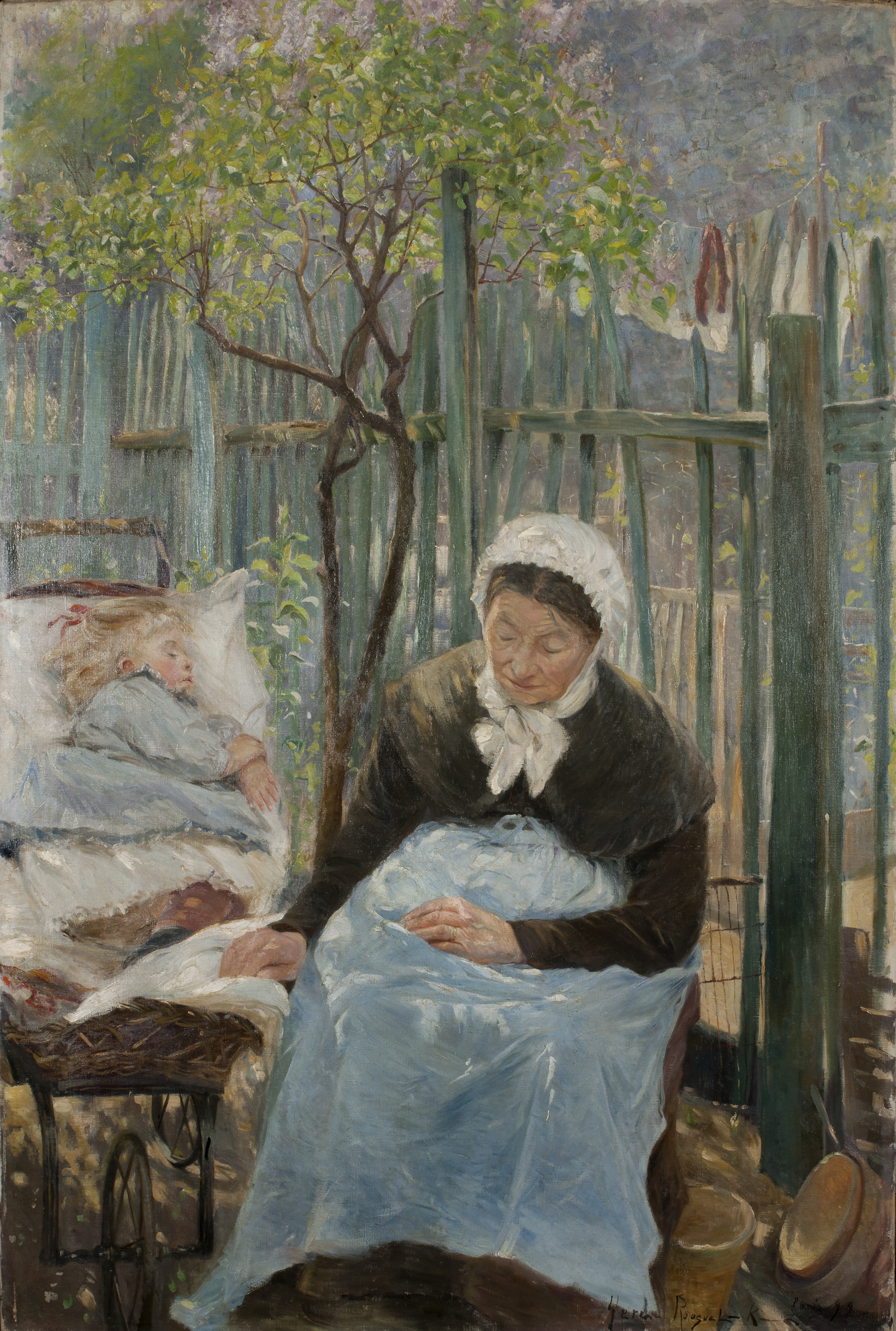
Paris in the Spring (1892)

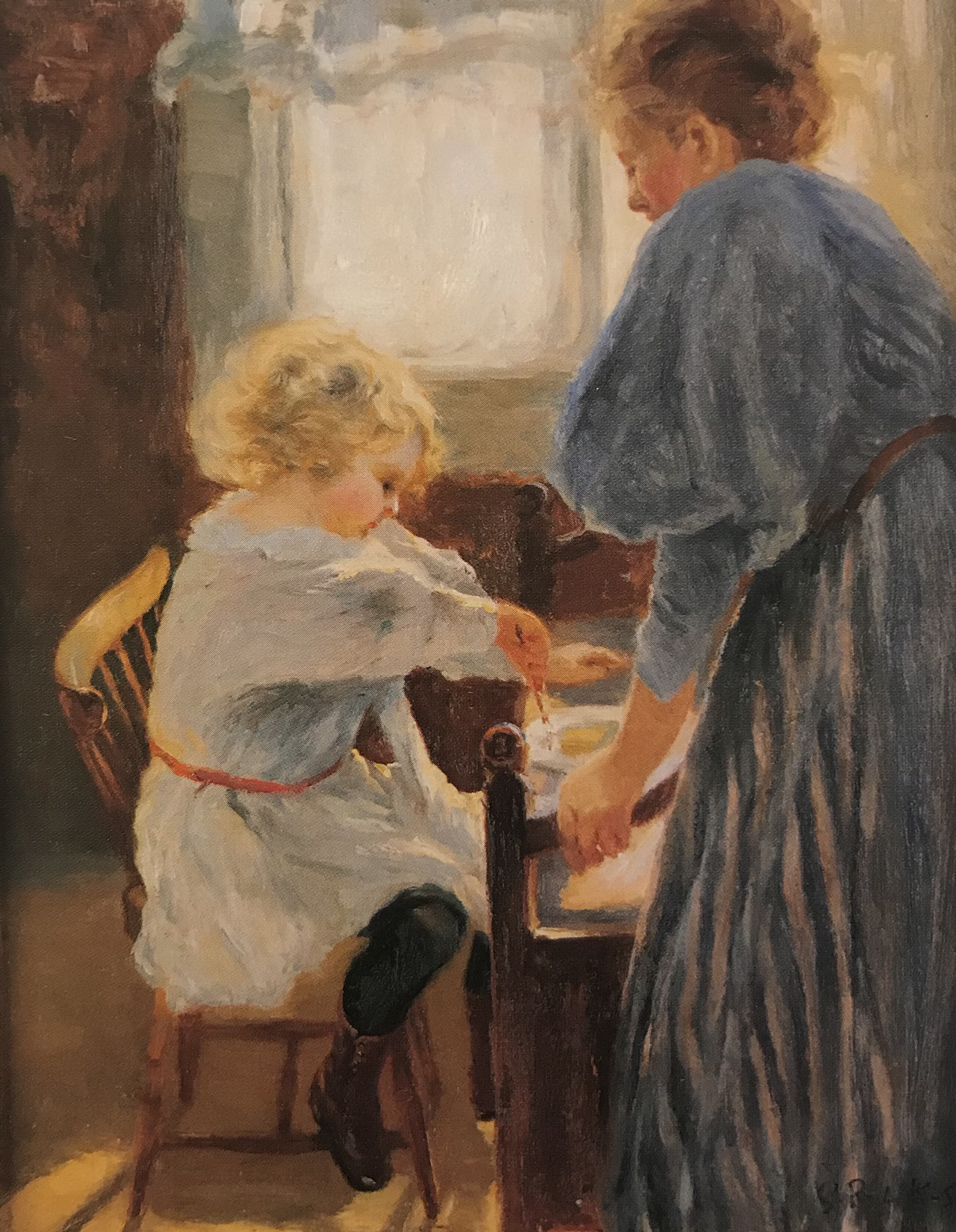
The artist's son John eats while his nanny Selma is standing by. (Borsö, c:1896)

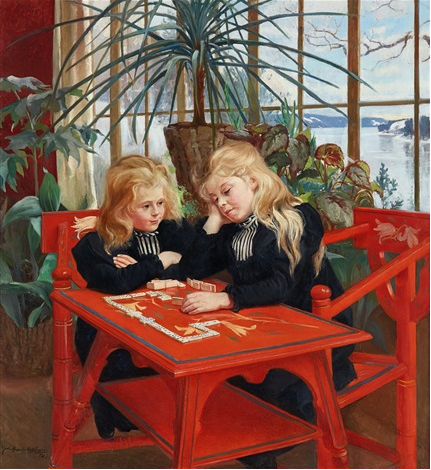
Playing Dominoes (1912)

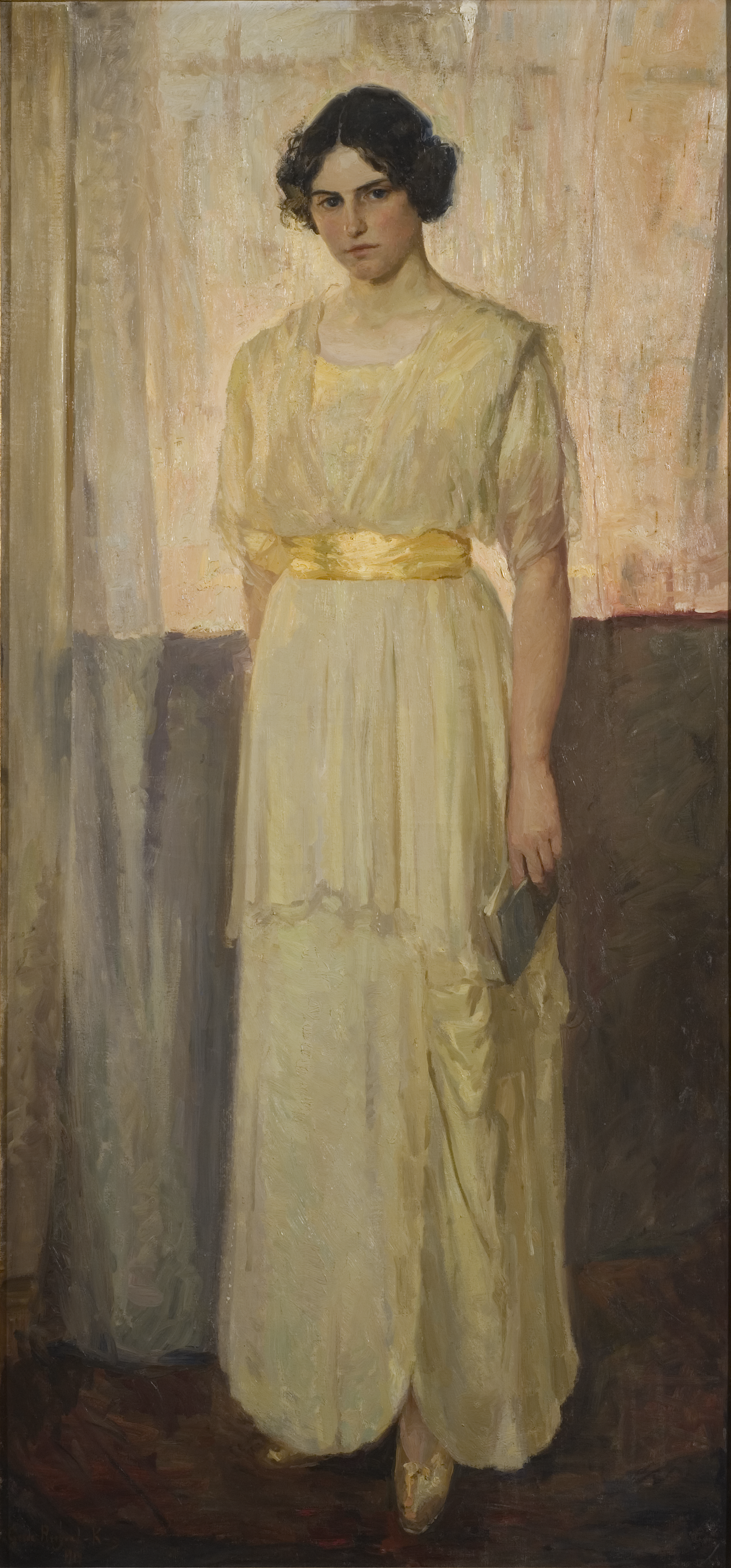
Portrait of Astrid Setterwall Ångström (1914)

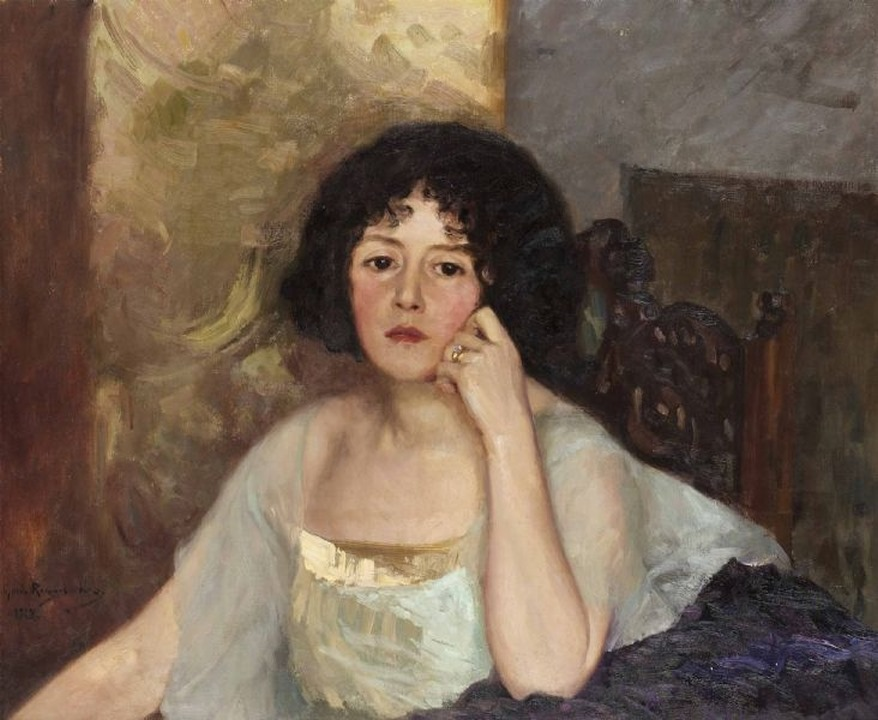
Portrait of Ellen Roosval von Hallwyl (1918)

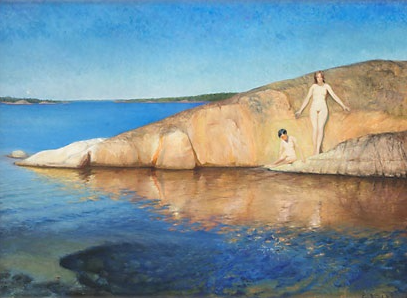
Cliff Bathing (1931)
