= Old Pulteney Row To The Pole =

The Row To The Pole was a major expedition (sponsored by a whisky brand Old Pulteney), which navigated a rowing boat to the North Magnetic Pole at 78°35.7N 104°11.9W, the position certified in 1996. Its mission was to highlight the scale and pace of the retreat of the Arctic Ocean's floating sea ice. It is believed to be the only polar expedition to feature rowing boats since the crew of Sir Ernest Shackleton's row to Elephant Island off South Georgia in 1916, after his aborted attempt to cross Antarctica. The 450-mile journey took almost four weeks.

The expedition set out from Resolute Bay on 28 July 2011, reaching the Pole position on 25 August. It was the first time any surface vessel under human power had been to any pole position. The expedition was the first attempt at such a voyage and was made possible by the open water in the Arctic region in summer. According to the National Snow and Ice Data Center, part of the University of Colorado, the Arctic sea ice melted to its third smallest extent (since 1979, when satellite measurements began) in September 2010. Prior to 1979 ice extents are unreliable.

== History ==
The adventure was conceived by Scots adventurer Jock Wishart in 2007 when Wishart was in Resolute Bay, Nunavut, Canada for the biannual Polar Race, which he organises. Having just completed the race, he had taken a rowing machine out of the hotel onto the ice. A friend, seeing him, joked, "What are you going to do next Jock? Row to the Pole!"

Jock Wishart publicly announced his intention and the expedition's financial sponsor, Scotch Whisky brand Old Pulteney, in April 2010.

The attempt began on 28 July 2011. The crew departed from Resolute Bay, Cornwallis Island heading across the Wellington Channel to the coast of Devon Island. In open waters they made swift progress to the top of the island, encountering their first significant sea ice whilst navigating the Grinnell Peninsula. After rowing via Cornwall Island to the south coast of Ellef Ringnes Island, the crew sheltered for several days at Thor Island before making their last dramatic push for the Pole. This was achieved on a long continuous row beginning at 1800 hours on 4 August 2011. The boat rowed through open water with icebergs and floating sea ice around the Noice Peninsula through channels opened up by the winds and sea currents before reaching a dense area of ice that had been driven into the bay by storms. At this point the boat's unique design as a sledge-boat enabled them to haul the boat from the water and manually pull it across the ice on the final 2–3 miles to the Pole. This boat-hauling exercise took the crew 10 hours to complete. They arrived at the Pole position on 26 August 2011. Jock Wishart announced the success saying "There is now a row boat at the '96 Mag. North Pole". On BBC Radio 4's Today programme as "an incredible journey that will go down in the history books. It's a true global first and probably one of the greatest rows of all time."

== Boat and crew ==
The expedition was led by maritime and polar adventurer, explorer and sportsman Jock Wishart. His crew were Mark Delstanche, Billy Gammon David Mans, Rob Sleep and Mark Beaumont. Beaumont filmed the voyage for a BBC documentary 'Rowing the Arctic'.

The expedition boat has three rowing positions on the open deck and berths for all six crew. It is self-righting and is fitted with additional equipment to enable it to be hauled out of the water onto ice and then pulled on its runners. As such it is a unique 'ice boat' design. The vessel has what is called a cathedral hull, so-named because of its profile resembling an upturned church roof. It was designed by Peter Bosgraaf, in collaboration with Welbourne Yacht Design. Hugh Welbourne advised on the laminates and under water construction, while Roger Daynes of advised on the design and construction of the "runners" on the bottom of the ice boat. The boat was built by Cris Rossiter in Christchurch, Dorset, UK.
