= Evald Kallstenius =

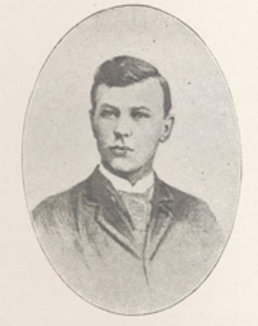
Evald Kallstenius

Evald Kallstenius (6 January 1868–189?) was a Swedish explorer and zoologist.

Evald Kallstenius was born in Västervik on 6 January 1868. His brother was the artist Gottfrid Kallstenius, and his cousin, also named Gottfrid, was an accomplished philologist. Evald Kallstenius received his upper secondary education in Örebro and then enrolled at Uppsala University in 1886, studying zoology. In 1892, after he had finished his studies but before he was formally awarded his degree, he joined Johan Alfred Björling on an ill-fated expedition of exploration to Greenland and the Carey Islands, know to posterity as the Björling–Kallstenius Expedition. The intention was for Kallstenius to be the zoologist of the expedition. The expedition ended in disaster and Kallstenius is presumed to have died in 1892 or 1893.
