= Gottfrid Kallstenius =

Swedish painter (1861–1943)

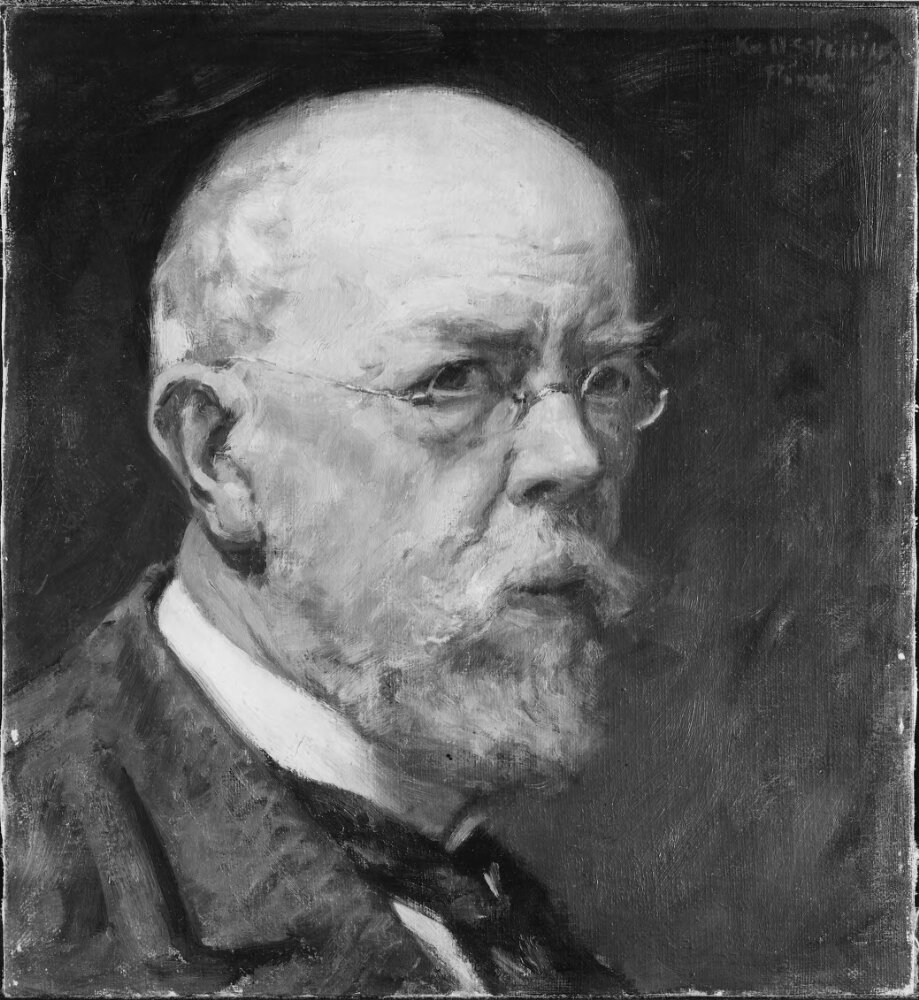
Self-portrait (1925)

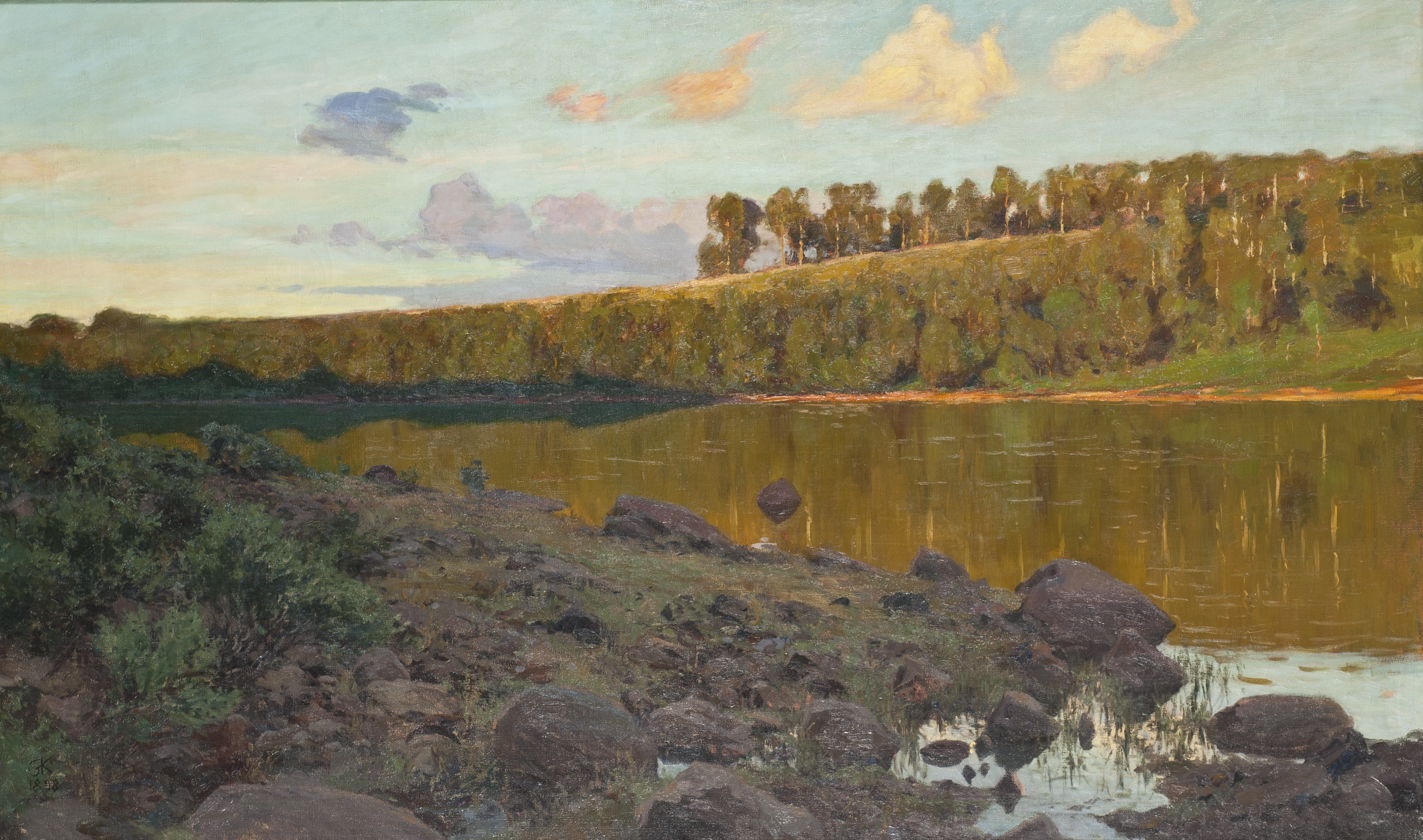
Lake in the Forest

Gottfrid Samuel Nikolaus Kallstenius (13 July 1861 – 26 May 1943, Nacka) was a Swedish painter.

== Biography ==
Gottfrid Kallstenius was born at Västervik, Sweden. His brother Evald Kallstenius (born 1868) was a zoologist and member of the ill-fated Björling–Kallstenius Expedition. After preparatory studies with Edvard Perséus, he was admitted to the Royal Swedish Academy of Fine Arts in 1884 and graduated in 1888 after receiving two medals for his work.

In 1891, he married the painter Gerda Roosval. Shortly after, he was awarded a travel scholarship and they spent a summer in Paris, completing their educations. From there, they went to live in Le Pouldu, in Brittany, where Paul Gauguin had spent the previous summer. After about a year, they returned to Paris where he had further studies with Raphaël Collin. Eventually, they settled in the Swedish artists' colony at Grez-sur-Loing. In 1893 and 1894 they visited Italy, where he developed an interest in ornamentation and decoration.

From 1898 to 1904, for an artist's fee and a share of tuition, he taught classes in decorative art. He became a full-time teacher in 1910, after failing to receive a professorship in landscape painting. In 1912, he was appointed a Vice-Professor. During this period he abandoned his earlier Realist styles.

He performed several large works; notably, an altarpiece in Västervik and murals at the Nordstjernan building, as well as mosaics at the Konstnärshuset. Later, he did a large landscape painting for the foyer at the Royal Dramatic Theatre.

He also wrote several texts on oil painting, including Oljemåleriet, färgstoff och bindämnen (Oil Painting, Dyes and Binders, 1913), Handbok i oljemålning (Handbook of Oil Painting, 1915) and Konsten, dess väsen och betydelse (Art: Its Essence and Meaning, 1931).

Most of his later life was spent with his wife Gerda at a villa they had built in 1906 designed by the architect Gustaf Petterson (1887–1925). Their son, Evald Kallstenius (1898–1957) was also a painter.
