= Shane Lundgren =

American aviator and businessman (born 1961)

Shane Christopher Lundgren
- Born: March 21, 1961 (age 65); Palo Alto, California, U.S.
- Education: University of San Diego
- Occupations: CEO, Metolius Aviation Capital
- Known for: Arctic aviation expeditions, aircraft leasing
- Father: Kim Lundgren

Shane Christopher Lundgren (born March 21, 1961) is an American aviator and business executive. He is the founder and CEO of Metolius Aviation Capital, a private aircraft investment firm. His career has included work in commercial aviation and aircraft leasing.

Lundgren is a Fellow of the Royal Geographical Society and a member of the Explorers Club. He has led several aviation-focused expeditions.

== Early life ==
Born in Palo Alto, California, Lundgren studied economics and history at the University of San Diego, graduating in 1984. He also trained at National Air College, where he earned various pilot certifications. In 1982, at 21 years of age, he was checked out in the Boeing 737 by Air Berlin USA, founded by father Kim Lundgren in Berlin, Germany. At the time, Shane was the youngest person to fly the 737 commercially.

== Career ==
Lundgren flew as a captain for Air Berlin from 1982 through 2012. After the fall of the Berlin Wall, Lundgren was involved in Air Berlin’s transition from a U.S.-registered airline to a German carrier. According to aviation industry reports, this marked a unique regulatory change in airline history.

In 1998 Lundgren went to work for Pembroke Capital in Dublin Ireland where he began to work in commercial aircraft leasing and finance. Lundgren led the North Pole Flight sponsored by Pembroke Capital. From 2000 to 2012 he was actively involved in aircraft asset sales and leases from the Air Berlin fleet. In 2015, he founded Metolius Aviation Capital, a firm focused on commercial aircraft investments.

== Expeditions ==
During travels in Russia after the fall of the Berlin Wall, Lundgren conceived a trans-Siberian flight (barnstorming style) in Russian Antonov An-2 biplanes. In 1994, Lundgren led an aviation expedition across Siberia, which was sponsored by Wired magazine and several technology companies. It has been described as one of the first expeditions to be documented online. The flight began in Moscow and proceeded north of the Arctic Circle across Siberia to Magadan. In 1995, the Smithsonian Institution's Arctic Studies Center joined Lundgren in another flying expedition to chronicle indigenous people from Yakutsk to Alaska across the Bering Straits. The expedition coincided with the early launch of Discovery Online, which featured content from the journey. Lundgren went on to found WorldSight, an early online magazine.

Lundgren led polar expeditions in 1997 and 1998. In 1998, a National Geographic Television documentary featured one of Lundgren's polar flights. On April 13, 1998, Lundgren piloted an expedition flight that landed at the North Pole, carrying the Explorers Club flag that Sir George Hubert Wilkins and Carl Ben Eielson carried across the top of the world in their 1929 flight.

The aircraft used in Lundgren's Arctic expeditions, an Antonov An-2 biplane (registration N61SL) is currently displayed in the Aviation Pavilion at Seattle's Museum of Flight.
