= National Air College =

Coordinates: 32.8247°N 116.9750°W

The National Air College is an FAA Certified Flight Training Academy located on Montgomery Field (KMYF) in San Diego, California. It is the longest surviving civilian Flight Training School in San Diego, and is the only flight training facility on Montgomery Airfield which maintains its own aircraft on its own aircraft hangars. National Air College is also an FAA Certified Repair Station, and employs its own mechanics.

== Background ==
The National Air College was founded by and operated by Nug Madariaga. Madariaga began his aviation career with the purchase of a Model B Funk in 1942, after which he served in the US Navy for 4 years, which included the remaining years of WWII. Following his navy service, Madriaga began flight training in the Riverside Flabob Airport, run by, and named after, his brother, Flavio and Bob Bogen. After his own flight training, Nug set up the first official flight training school at Flabob Airport, and in 1957, he opened the National Air College at Montgomery Airfield in San Diego. Operating in the same location ever since, NAC is the longest surviving civilian aviation training facility in San Diego. As well as being the owner of NAC, Nug himself holds certifications in all FAA Ratings (including... SEL, MEL, CFII, ATP, Helo), and served as an FAA Flight Examiner for 25 years.

Gregg Madariaga Following in his father's footsteps early on, Gregg Madariaga was setting records at the age of sixteen. Montgomery Field was buzzing, not just with airplanes but with the media, when Gregg became the youngest pilot in the United States to solo in 38 different aircraft types. Then, at the age of 18, Gregg became not only the youngest helicopter pilot in the U.S., but also the youngest helicopter instructor as well! With his father as his CFI, Gregg received all of his ratings from NAC, and joined his father there as a flight instructor. The father & son pair flew air-taxi and military flight operations for some time to San Clemente and San Nicholas Islands. Gregg later became a Corporate Pilot and has since advanced from the Gulfstream-4 aircraft to the Global Express. And like his father before him, Gregg has now been an FAA Designated Examiner for over 25 years.

== Training Offered ==
National Air College offers training opportunities for every level of pilot proficiency. From Student Pilot to Airline Transport Pilot.

National Air College provides training which produces the finest quality aviators. NAC students from around the world have become NAC instructors, and many of them have been hired by professional airlines. National Air College has been an important part of the aviation community in San Diego for so long, that some former NAC students are even retiring from airlines today.

== Fleet ==
- Piper Seneca- 1
- Duchess Twin- 1
- Cessna 172- 3
- Piper Arrow- 1
- Piper Archer- 2
- Piper Warrior- 4
