= Arne Høygaard =

Norwegian physician and Arctic explorer

- Born: 15 January 1906; Lillesand, Norway
- Died: 16 December 1981 (aged 75); Salta, Argentina
- Occupation: physician
- Spouse(s): Unni Munthe Wulfsberg (married 1933); Theresa Flores (married 1974)
- Parent(s): Bernt Høygaard; Aagot Høygaard, née Jacobsen

Arne Høygaard (15 January 1906 – 16 December 1981) was a Norwegian physician and Arctic explorer.

== Biography ==
Høygaard was born in Lillesand. After completing school in 1924, he went to sea for one year. In 1925, he commenced his medical studies at Oslo University. He worked at Ullevål Hospital in Oslo, at Haukeland Hospital in Bergen, and at the physiological institute of Oslo University before gaining his doctorate in 1941.

Høygaard participated in several Arctic expeditions. In 1928, he want to Spitsbergen together with O.J. Broch and Eyvind Fjeld to study the island's geography. He returned the following year with Martin Mehren and Olav Staxrud. In 1931, Høygaard and Mehren crossed Greenland's ice sheet from Uummannaq to Nordfjord by dog-sled. Together with his wife, Unni Munthe Wulfsberg, as well as Harald Waage Rasmussen and Edward Falsen-Krohn, he spent the winter of 1936–1937 studying the Inuit residents at Angmagssalik (now Tasiilaq).

During the German occupation of Norway, Høygaard joined the far-right Nasjonal Samling. He was charged with treason in 1948, after which he fled the country to Argentina, where he continued to work as a physician in the town of Cachi. In 1950, Høygaard took part in the first ascent of Nevado de Cachi, the second highest peak of which is now named after him. He died in 1981.
