= Cornelis Nay =

Dutch navigator and explorer

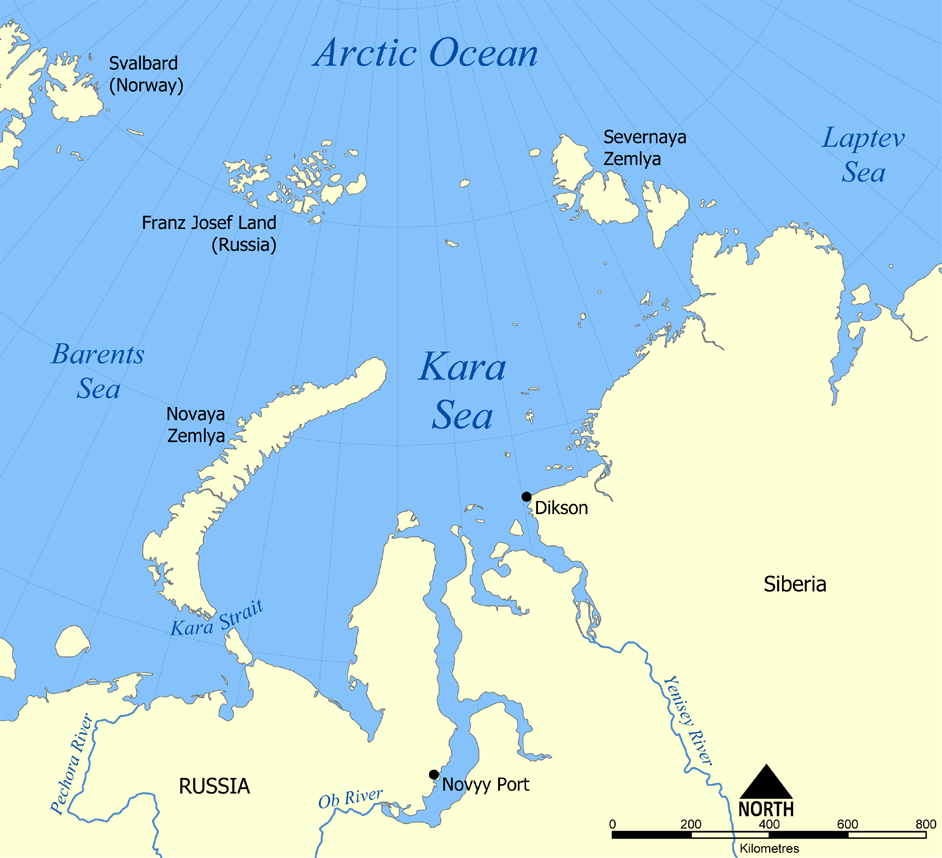
Cornelis Nay reached the Kara Sea in August 1594

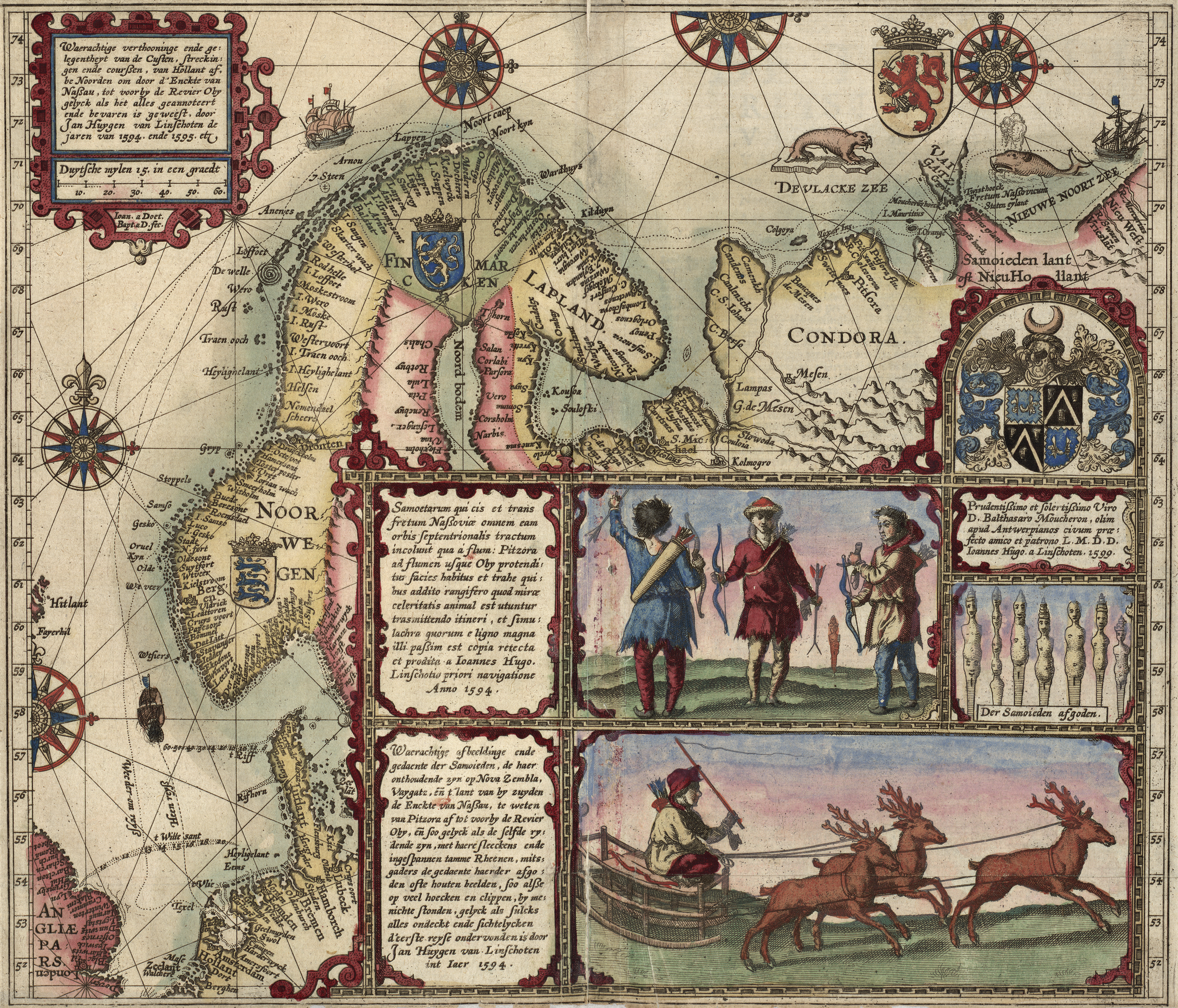
1601 map of the 1594 voyage

Cornelis Corneliszoon Nay was a Dutch navigator and explorer who attempted to discover the Northeast Passage from Europe to the Far East. He came from Enkhuizen in the Netherlands.

In June 1594, he set out from the Dutch island of Texel with a small fleet consisting of three ships and a fishing sloop to discover the Northeast Passage. Nay commanded the ship De Zwaan. He sailed together with Brandt Tetgales commanding the Mercurius. A fellow explorer, Willem Barentsz, who commanded the third ship also called Mercurius as well as the fishing boat, followed the coast of Novaya Zemlya, but his progress was halted by ice. Nay and Tetgales were more successful: they passed through the Yugor Strait and reached the Kara Sea.

Nay's success led to a second expedition the following year (1595) with a larger fleet, consisting of seven ships. The expedition was under the command of Nay to which Barentsz was strongly opposed. Having left too late in the season, the explorers were soon stopped by the ice. Barentsz wanted to stop for the winter and continue in the spring, but Nay decided that the fleet should return home.

The Dutch government considered the expedition a total failure and refused to fund a new expedition. Nevertheless, a third attempt was made the following year, in 1596 - this time without Nay. This was the famed expedition during which Barentsz and his men managed to survive the winter on Novaya Zemlya, though Barentsz died on the way home.

Although Nay and Barentsz failed to find the passage to the East by way of the Arctic Sea, the Dutch journeys of exploration in the Arctic paved the way for large-scale whale and seal fishery which greatly enriched the Netherlands during the Dutch Golden Age.
