= Carey Islands =

Island group off Baffin Bay, Greenland

Native name: Kitsissut
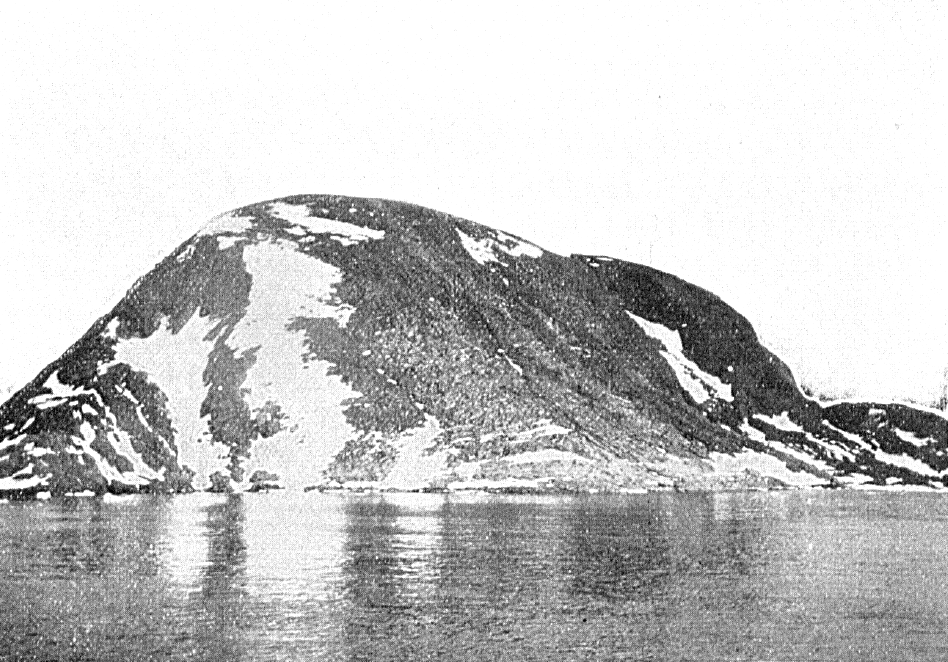
- View of Björling Island

- Location within Greenland

Geography
- Location: Baffin Bay, Greenland
- Coordinates: 76.666667°N 72.5°W
- Archipelago: Carey Islands
- Total islands: 6
- Major islands: Nordvestø
- Highest elevation: 300 m (1000 ft)

Administration
- Greenland
- Municipality: Avannaata

Demographics
- Population: uninhabited

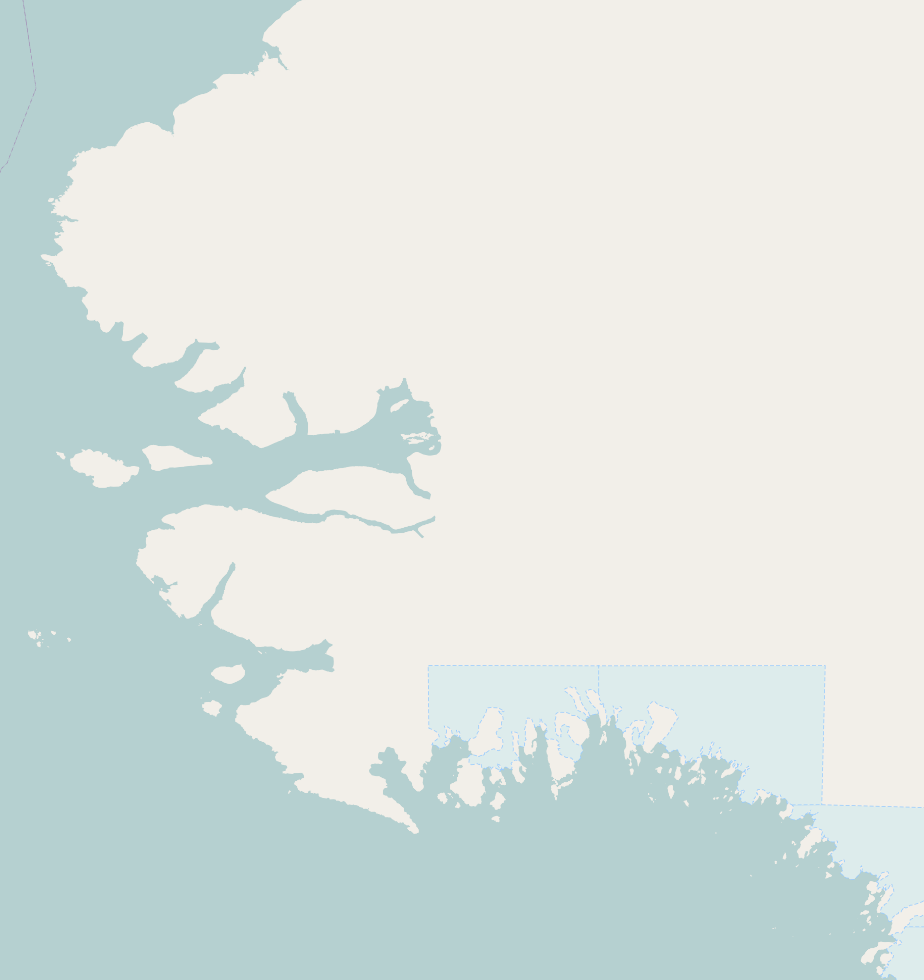
Location of the Carey Islands

The Carey Islands (Danish: Carey Øer; Greenlandic: Kitsissut) are an island group off Baffin Bay, in Avannaata municipality, northwest Greenland. Located relatively far offshore the Carey Islands are the westernmost point of Greenland as a territory. The sea surrounding the islands is clogged by ice most of the year.

== Geography ==
The archipelago consists of six desolate islands, a few small islets and a number of rocks awash. It is located about 100 kilometres (62 mi) to the west of Thule Air Base and 50 kilometres (31 mi) to the SW of Cape Parry.

The nearest settlement is Moriusaq to the east on the coast of Greenland, abandoned since 2007.

=== Islands ===
==== Main islands ====
- Nordvestø, Isbjørneø and Mellemø form a compact cluster at the NW end of the archipelago.
  - Nordvestø, the biggest island with a length of 4.5 kilometres (2.8 mi) and a width of nearly 3 kilometres (1.9 mi). This island's western landhead is the westernmost point of Greenland. Its highest point is 225 metres (738 ft).
  - Isbjørneø and Mellemø, lying close to the east and forming a natural harbour between them and Nordvestø.
- Bordø and Björlingø, located further to the east; the latter has a 300 metres (980 ft) high peak and is named after Johan Alfred Björling.
- Fireø, lying in the southern area of the group.

==== Islets ====
- Hollænderhatten and Tyreøjet are two small islets to the east of Fireø having a diameter of a few hundred metres. there are also numerous other islets and rocks, especially in the western sector of the archipelago.

=== Climate ===
Climate data for Kitsissut, Greenland (2009-2020)
Month	Jan	Feb	Mar	Apr	May	Jun	Jul	Aug	Sep	Oct	Nov	Dec	Year
Record high °C (°F)	0.1 (32.2)	0.6 (33.1)	2.9 (37.2)	−0.1 (31.8)	8.9 (48.0)	10.5 (50.9)	13.1 (55.6)	10.4 (50.7)	8.0 (46.4)	2.4 (36.3)	1.6 (34.9)	−0.5 (31.1)	13.1 (55.6)
Mean daily maximum °C (°F)	−14.7 (5.5)	−15.8 (3.6)	−16.4 (2.5)	−10.0 (14.0)	−2.8 (27.0)	2.2 (36.0)	6.2 (43.2)	5.0 (41.0)	0.6 (33.1)	−3.8 (25.2)	−9.1 (15.6)	−13.0 (8.6)	−6.0 (21.2)
Daily mean °C (°F)	−16.6 (2.1)	−17.7 (0.1)	−18.2 (−0.8)	−11.6 (11.1)	−4.0 (24.8)	0.7 (33.3)	4.4 (39.9)	3.7 (38.7)	−0.3 (31.5)	−5.0 (23.0)	−10.9 (12.4)	−14.8 (5.4)	−7.5 (18.5)
Mean daily minimum °C (°F)	−18.4 (−1.1)	−19.4 (−2.9)	−20.1 (−4.2)	−13.4 (7.9)	−5.4 (22.3)	−0.7 (30.7)	2.8 (37.0)	2.3 (36.1)	−1.3 (29.7)	−6.2 (20.8)	−12.5 (9.5)	−16.6 (2.1)	−9.1 (15.6)
Record low °C (°F)	−33.4 (−28.1)	−28.4 (−19.1)	−32.7 (−26.9)	−26.7 (−16.1)	−15.0 (5.0)	−6.0 (21.2)	−2.3 (27.9)	−2.4 (27.7)	−6.2 (20.8)	−15.6 (3.9)	−23.9 (−11.0)	−30.3 (−22.5)	−33.4 (−28.1)
Average relative humidity (%)	75.4	74.1	74.4	75.5	80.5	87.4	86.5	88.7	81.5	79.5	77.3	76.1	79.7
Source: DMI (humidity 2011-2020)

== Important Bird Area ==
The island group has been designated an Important Bird Area (IBA) by BirdLife International because it supports a breeding population of some 6,700 pairs of thick-billed murres, as well as other seabirds including glaucous gulls, razorbills, black guillemots and Atlantic puffins.

== History ==
The islands had been inhabited by the Inuit in the past; remains of their dwellings were found by Clements Markham in August 1851.

The Carey Islands' were named by the 1616 Bylot-Baffin Arctic expedition after Allwin Carey, one of the financiers of the venture.

Swedish naturalists Alfred Björling and Evald Kallstenius stopped at the Carey Islands in 1892 during an expedition on schooner Ripple to pick up supplies at a cache there. The Ripple, however, was driven on shore and wrecked. The men attempted to sail a small sloop back to Etah, but were forced to return to the Carey Islands.

According to letters left by members of the ill-fated expedition in a cairn on the islands, the remaining four men attempted to sail their open boat 80 miles to Ellesmere Island:

Forced by bad weather to linger on this island for a long time, I now set out on the tour to the Eskimos... on Ellesmere Island. As I hope that a whaler will visit the Carey Islands next summer to rescue me and my companions, I will try to reach the islands again before July 1. We are now five men, of which one is dying.

In June 1893, the crew of the Scottish whaler Aurora spotted a wreck on the Carey Islands. They found the Ripple, a man's body buried under a pile of stones, and Björling's letters. No trace of the other four men, or the small boat, was ever found.

== See also ==
- List of islands of Greenland
- Björling-Kallstenius Expedition
- Cape Alexander, Greenland
