= Charles Bénard Le Pontois =

French mariner and Arctic explorer

Charles Marie Eugène Pierre Bénard
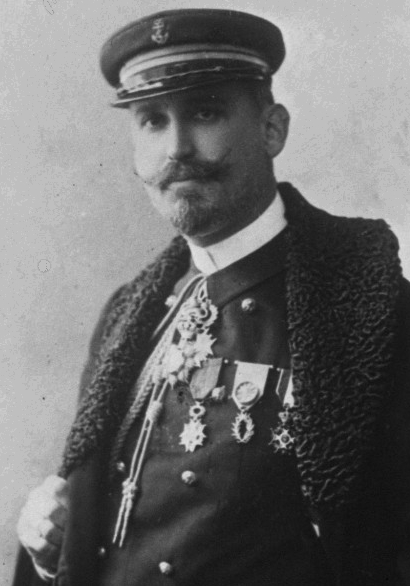
- Charles Bénard, 1908.
- Born: 4 February 1867; Redon
- Died: 16 November 1931 (aged 64); Penmarc'h
- Cause of death: suicide by asphyxiation
- Other name: Charles Bénard Le Pontois
- Known for: Exploration of Novaya Zemlya
- Spouses: Suzanne Sursol (m. 1891; div. 1922) Gabrielle Philippson-Goldschmidt (m. 1923; div. 1931)
- Children: 2
- Parents: Charles Eugène Adrien Bénard; Marie Perrine Grouhel

Charles Marie Eugène Pierre Bénard (4 February 1867 – 16 November 1931) was a French mariner, who engaged in Arctic exploration, oceanography, and archaeology.

== Biography ==
Bénard was born in Redon, a town in Brittany. His father was the local stationmaster for the Compagnie d'Orléans. In 1873, his father was transferred to Bordeaux where Bénard graduated school. He entered the École navale at the age of 16 and completed his training in 1886. In the French Navy, he was at sea near Newfoundland, among other places. He quit the navy in 1891 with the rank of Enseigne de vaisseau. In the following, Bénard settled in Bordeaux, where he was on the board of directors of several civilian shipping companies. In 1899, he co-founded the Société d'Océanographie du Golfe de Gascogne, through which he made friends with fellow oceanography and exploration enthusiast Albert I, Prince of Monaco.

In 1908, Bénard led an expedition named Mission Océanographique Arctique Française. The expedition's main goals were estimating the potential for fishing off the coast of Northern Norway, oceanographic studies of the Barents Sea, and geological investigations on Novaya Zemlya. The newly constructed sailing vessel Jacques Cartier served as the expedition ship. The voyage was under the patronage of Prince Albert, while Jules Charles-Roux chaired the expedition committee. Jacques Cartier set sail from Dunkirk on 12 April 1908 with 19 people aboard. The chief medical officer was named Candiotti, the captain Desmazières. During most of June, the ship stayed at Hammerfest where the local fishing could be studied. In the Barents Sea, oceanographic observations were made. On 7 July, Novaya Zemlya was reached when the ship anchored at Belushya Guba and the expedition made contact with the local Nenets population. On 24 July, the Russian geologist Vladimir Rusanov was dropped off by a mail steamer to join the party. Several exploring trips were made across the archipelago. Candiotti and Rusanov led a successful crossing of the northern island, mapping Zaliv Neznayemyy for the first time. Bénard himself conducted surveying work around Rogachëv Bay, and in the interior of the peninsula Gusinaya Zemlya. In late August, Jacques Cartier left Novaya Zemlya for Arkhangelsk where after some disagreement about continuing the expedition work next season, she was finally sold and the crew was repatriated.

In 1914, Bénard returned to Novaya Zemlya, where he hiked across the southern island alone, before crossing Gusinaya Zemlya by dogsledding together with a Nenets companion.

At the start of the First World War, Bénard was mobilised and put in command of the squadron of minesweepers at Toulon. He was later promoted to the rank of Capitaine de frégate.

After the war, Bénard moved to Penmarc'h, where he devoted himself to archaeology. When marine officer and notable archaeologist Louis Eugène Le Pontois died in 1919, Bénard added "Le Pontois" to his name to honor his distant cousin. In 1922, he divorced his wife Suzanne, but remarried Gabrielle Philippson-Goldschmidt the following year. She was the daughter of a wealthy Belgian banker and herself divorced. The couple had two children together. With Théodore Monod and Pierre Favret, Bénard Le Pontois performed excavations in the local area and founded the Musée de la Préhistoire finistérienne. In 1931, Gabrielle and Charles divorced. Shortly after returning from an expedition with Monod to the Sahara desert, Bénard Le Pontois learned that his ex-wife intended to take their two children and end her alimony payments to him. Unable to face this situation, he asphyxiated his children and himself.

== Honours ==
- Officier de la Légion d'honneur
- Croix de guerre 1914-1918

== Publications ==
- Le Venezuela, études physiques, politiques, commerciales, minières et agricoles, 1897.
- Histoire des Expositions de Bordeaux, Société Philomathique de Bordeaux, 1899.
- La Conquête du Pôle, 1904.
- Dans l'océan Glacial et la Nouvelle-Zemble (avril-septembre 1908), 1909.
- Mission Arctique : Stations scientifiques, Cartographie - Météorologie, vol. 6, Bordeaux, Société d'Océanographie du Golfe de Gascogne, 1911.
- Co-authored with P. Favret, G. Boisselier: Importance archéologique de la presqu'île de la Torche, Penmarc'h, Finistère, Quimper, Jaouen, 1919.
- Un été chez les Samoyèdes, 1921.
- Finistère préhistorique, Paris, Édition Nourry, 1929.
