= Martin Mehren =

Norwegian businessperson and sportsperson

- Born: 8 August 1905; Kristiania, Norway
- Died: 2 October 2002 (aged 97)
- Occupations: Businessperson, sportsperson
- Relatives: Stein Mehren (nephew)

Martin Mehren (8 August 1905 – 2 October 2002) was a Norwegian businessperson and sportsperson.

== Personal life ==
Mehren was born on 8 August 1905 in Kristiania (now Oslo), Norway. He was the son of merchant Herman Mehren (1875-1941) and Agnethe Ingberg (1882-1937), and was an uncle of poet Stein Mehren.

== Career ==
Mehren became Norwegian champion in rowing several times, and twice Scandinavian champion. During the summer of 1931, he crossed Greenland on ski with Arne Høygaard, travelling from Uummannaq to Nordfjord.

Together with his brother, Arne Mehren (1910-1990), he chaired the clothing company Herman Mehren AS from 1935, which had been established by his father in 1903. He chaired the Norwegian Trekking Association from 1953 to 1957, and was a member of the advisory board from 1957 to 1981.

His brother's son was the poet Stein Mehren.
