= Lonnie Dupre =

American Arctic explorer (born 1961)

- Born: April 17, 1961 (age 65)
- Occupations: Arctic Explorer, Climber, Sportsman
- Known for: Greenland circumnavigation, Northwest Passage traversal, North Pole expeditions
- Awards: Rolex Awards for Enterprise
- Website: One World Endeavors

Lonnie Dupre (born 17 April 1961) is an American Arctic explorer whose achievements include the first Pacific to Atlantic winter traversal of the Northwest Passage by dog sled in 1991 and the first and only human-powered circumnavigation of Greenland, by dog sled and kayak, in 2001. In 2006, he also successfully executed the first human-powered summer expedition to the North Pole by sled and canoe, and would later return to the pole as part of the unsupported human-powered 2009 Peary-Henson Centennial Expedition.

In January 2015, Dupre completed a solo climb of Denali after three previous attempts. Sixteen people had previously reached Denali's summit in winter, although six died on the descent and none made the climb during January.

In 2004, Dupre was honoured with the Rolex Award for Enterprise for bringing attention to the impacts of climate change on the Arctic through his expeditions, among other Northern issues.
