= Jock Wishart =

British adventurer

Jock Wishart FRSGS is a maritime and polar adventurer, sportsman and explorer. Until his successful 2011 Old Pulteney Row to the Pole, he was best known for his circumnavigation of the globe in a powered vessel, setting a new world record in the Cable & Wireless Adventurer and for organising and leading the Polar Race.

== Early life ==
Jock Wishart was educated in Dumfries at the local academy. He attended Durham University (College of the Venerable Bede) for a degree in Combined Arts. He became President of Durham University Boat Club and later served as President of the Durham Union. In Easter term of 1973 he was elected President of the Durham University Athletic Union for the forthcoming year.

== Recent expeditions and adventures ==
In 2015 Jock led an expedition the 1996 Magnetic North Pole for the children's charity of rugby – Wooden Spoon. The Arctic Rugby Challenge was a trek across the ice to the Pole where they played the 'most northerly rugby match in history'. He trained the participants, including former international rugby stars Tim Stimpson and Ollie Phillips, in Arctic trekking and survival skills. Jock was forced to direct operations from Resolute Bay after an injury prevented his own participation. His teams reached the Pole and succeeded in playing the 'most northerly' rugby match supervised by former England hooker Lee Mears as referee. It has been recognised as an official Guinness World Record. Wooden Spoon expected to raise in excess of £200,000 from the fundraiser.

In 2010 Wishart announced his intention to take a rowing boat to the certified 1996 position of the Geomagnetic North Pole (The position is 78°35.7N 104°11.9W). At the time, he described how it has only become possible to consider an attempt like this in recent years due to the increase in seasonal sea ice melt and the much-documented changes to the Arctic climate.

His expedition, The Old Pulteney Row to the Pole voyage, set out on 28 July 2011 from Resolute Bay, Nunavut, Canada, to travel 450 miles. At the, Wishart described the timing of the expedition as being crucial because the final section of the journey is only navigable for a few weeks of the year before refreezing.

Wishart said of his latest expedition: "It is hard to imagine that in the 21st century there are still parts of our oceans that have never been explored. This is truly a voyage into the unknown – within 60 nautical miles of the start of our voyage; we will be taking The Old Pulteney through waters that have may never been navigated by any surface vessel."

On 25 August 2011 at 1830 hours Wishart's boat reached this Pole position. He announced the success saying: "There is now a row boat at the '96 Mag. North Pole"

He has written on the expedition's diary blog at www.rowtothepole.com

== Americas Cup ==
Jock Wishart sailed as a grinder on Lionheart, the 1980 British challenger for the America's Cup.

== North Pole expeditions ==
Jock Wishart has twice trekked to the North Pole in record-setting expeditions.

== Transatlantic row boating ==
In 1997 Wishart and teammate Duncan Nicoll placed 10th in a trans-Atlantic rowboat race from the Canary Islands to Barbados.

== Record breaking circumnavigation of the globe in a powered vessel ==
Wishart and his crew on the Cable & Wireless Adventurer, left Gibraltar on 19 April 1998 on their 26,000-mile worldwide journey. The journey encompassed 15 ports in 10 countries, and the intention was to complete the journey inside 80 days, which would have been shorter than the 83 days that the US Navy's USS Triton nuclear-powered submarine remained submerged during Operation Sandblast in 1960. While the circumnavigation portion of Operation Sandblast is claimed to have taken 60 days, 21 hours, this has not been recognised by Guinness World Records.

The team ultimately completed the circumnavigation in 74 days, 20 hours and 58 minutes, 7 days faster than the 83 days that the Triton was submerged.

== The Polar Race ==
In 1996, Wishart and David Hempleman-Adams organised The Ultimate Challenge, in which they chose 10 arctic novices from over 500 applicants and successfully led them to the Magnetic North Pole.

Following the success of this expedition, which proved that novices could be trained and equipped for a Polar expedition, the two men established The Polar Race. The first Polar Race was April 2003. Before April, it is too dark and after April there is open water. Since 2003, the race has been run every other year: 2003, 2005, 2007, 2009 and 2011. As of May 2007, three races have been run with 40 out of 41 competitors successfully reaching the Pole. In the ensuing two races, every competitor reached the North Pole.

== Old Pulteney Row to the Pole ==
In 2011, Wishart led a crew on a voyage that rowed 500 miles on journey to the 1996 certified position of the Magnetic North Pole. The expedition team included Adventurers and mariners Mark Delstanche, Rob Sleep, Billy Gammon and Captain David Mans. The BBC filmed the expedition for a TV documentary and its filmmaker Mark Beaumont joined the crew. The boat was named The Old Pulteney after the project sponsor's single malt whisky brand. The expedition rowed through open waters during the summer melting season, reaching the Pole position in Deer Bay on 25 August. The boat was designed to enable the crew to be hauled over the ice where navigation on water was impossible. This was only required for the last 2 miles where ice had blown into Deer Bay during a period of high winds.
