= Johan Alfred Björling =

Swedish botanist and Arctic explorer

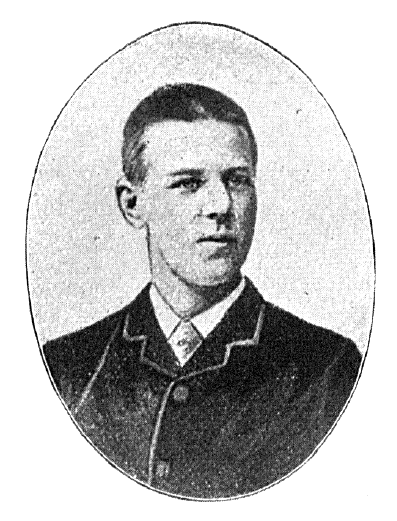
Johan Alfred Björling

Johan Alfred Björling (19 October 1871 – 1892/1893) was a Swedish botanist and Arctic explorer. He led the ill-fated Swedish NW Greenland Expedition, also known as Björling–Kallstenius Expedition, in 1892.

== Life ==
Björling was born on 19 October 1871 in Stockholm, Sweden and was the son of Johan Alfred Björling and Lydia Kastengren. He passed his studentexamen in 1891 and took part in the 1890 expedition to Spitsbergen and shipped in 1891 a Greenlandic merchant ship to the west coast of Greenland, where he using a rowboat penetrated north to the area of Devils Thumb. He died in 1892 or 1893 in the Canadian Arctic. He was the nephew of Swedish mathematician Emanuel Björling (1808–1872).

== Expeditions ==
In the summer of 1889 as a 17‑year‑old, he led an expedition along with two companions to become the first to climb Kebnekaise, the highest mountain in Sweden.

In 1890, he participated in an expedition to Greenland and Spitsbergen. He continued his exploration of Greenland by going to Upernivik, which is the northernmost part of Greenland. From there he successfully rowed an Eskimo boat all the way north to the Devil's Thumb.

=== 1892 Swedish NW Greenland Expedition ===
In the spring of 1892 he was on the EGG Kallstenius, heading for northwest Greenland. His planned to survey the largely unexplored polar basin at the northern tip of North America. His route passed through Newfoundland, where he bought a schooner called Ripple for the trip north. He also hired a crew and bought provisions for the trip. The ship sailed and was never heard from again. The next time people heard about the company was through a telegram, sent in November 1893 by the whaler Aurora, which stated that the ship had passed the wrecks of Ripple on June 17 of that year at the mouth of Smith Sound.

Notes found later revealed details of Björling's tragic expedition. According to the notes, Ripple sailed from Godhavn on August 2, 1892 toward Baffin Bay, and crossing it to Melville Bay to Cape York. From there Björling moved on to Carey Islands to replenish his supplies from the English depot there. His ship, however, had to be abandoned at the island's south coast. After that, instead of trying to head for Greenland's west coast, where the expedition almost certainly would have been rescued, Björling headed north to Northumberlandön and from there back to the Carey Islands, finally arriving in Ellesmereland. There Björling hoped to meet Eskimos and ask for food and help. Unfortunately, that never happened.

== Posthumous honours ==
Björlingø, an island of the Carey group is named after this Swedish explorer.
