= Björling–Kallstenius Expedition =

1892 Arctic expedition

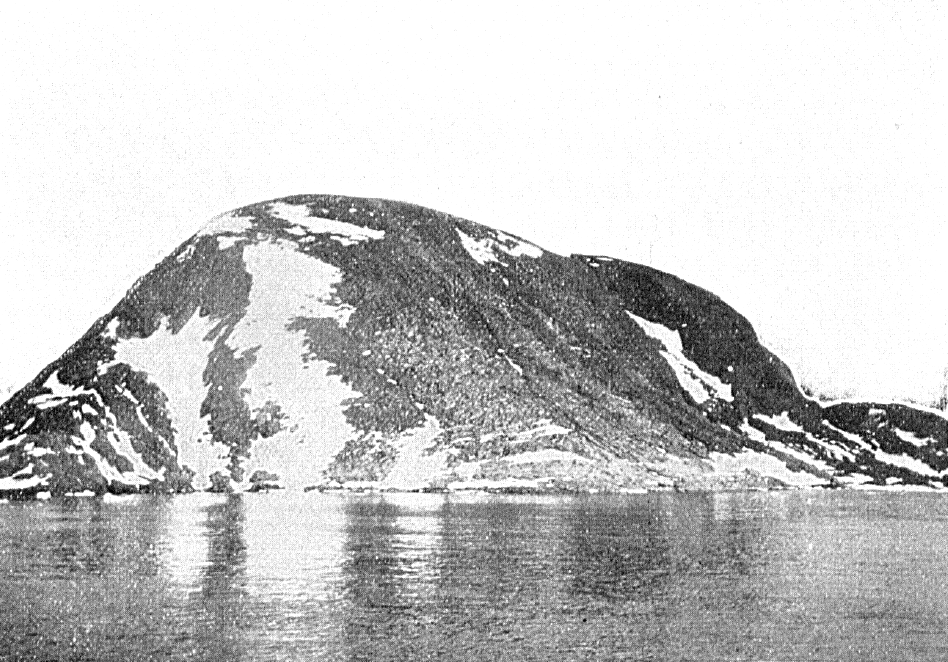
View of desolate and barren Björling Island, one of the Carey Islands.

The Björling–Kallstenius Expedition was an ill-fated, Arctic expedition led by Swedish naturalists Alfred Björling (1871-1892) and Evald Kallstenius (1868-1892). Their aim was to be the first to reach the North Pole. The expedition ended in disaster, with the deaths of the five member crew.

== Expedition ==
In 1892, 21-year-old Alfred Björling organized an expedition to be the first to reach the North Pole. Björling convinced fellow countryman and zoologist Evald Kallstenius to join him on what was described as a "botanizing expedition to northern Greenland". The expedition was mounted on a very low budget and is considered to have been a romantic, even foolhardy, attempt at the Pole.

In May 1892, the expedition left Stockholm with a course towards Liverpool and on to St. John's, Newfoundland. The explorers purchased the schooner Ripple in St. John's, hiring a crew of three; a Dane and two Newfoundlanders. In June the expedition left St. John's and July 28 reached Godhavn in Greenland. The exact history of the expedition is not well known, however it appears that their plan was to sail to Etah and hire local Inuit to help them reach the Pole. While stopping at the Carey Islands in Baffin Bay to pick up supplies at a cache there, the Ripple was driven on shore and wrecked. The men attempted to sail a small sloop (also purchased in Newfoundland) back to Etah but were forced to return to the Carey Islands.

According to letters left in a cairn on the Carey Islands, the four men attempted to sail their open boat 80 miles to Ellesmere Island:

Forced by bad weather to linger on this island for a long time, I now set out on the tour to the Eskimos... on Ellesmere Island. As I hope that a whaler will visit Carey Island next summer to rescue me and my companions, I will try to reach this island again before July 1. We are now five men, of which one is dying.

In June 1893, the crew of the Scottish whaler Aurora spotted a wreck on the Carey Islands. They found the Ripple and a man's body buried under a pile of stones. They found as well Björling's letters. In July 1894, a Swedish search expedition led by explorer Axel Ohlin (1867–1903) went to the area and located the wreck and related tracks on the Carey Islands. No trace of the other four men, or the small boat, was ever found.

== Other sources ==
- Mowat, Farley (1967). The Polar Passion: The Quest for the North Pole. Toronto: McClelland and Stewart Limited.
