= List of ship launches in the 1600s =

This list of ship launches in the 1600s includes a chronological list of some ships launched from 1600 to 1609.

	Ship	Class / type	Builder	Location	Country	Notes
1600	Tarihi Kadırga	Galley			Turkey	For Ottoman sultans
1602	Trost	Little ship			Denmark–Norway	For Royal Danish Navy
1605	Katten	Yacht		Scotland	Denmark–Norway	For Royal Danish Navy
Before 1607	Godspeed	Full-rigged ship			England	Founded Jamestown
1607	San Buena Ventura	3-masted ship	Miura Anjin		Japan	For Tokugawa Ieyasu
1607	Virginia	Pinnace	Digby of London	Popham Colony	England	For Virginia Company
1608	Halve Maen	Flyboat			Dutch Republic	For Dutch East India Company
1608	Red Lion of England	Merchantman		Deptford	England	For private owner.
1609	Trades Increase	Merchantman			England	For East India Company
1625	Trost	Fast ship	David Balfour		Denmark–Norway	For Royal Danish Navy
Unknown year	Den Røde Løve	Warship			Denmark–Norway	For Dano-Norwegian Navy
Unknown year	Don de Dieu	Transport			France	Founded Quebec City
Unknown year	Fogel Grip	Full-rigged pinnace		Netherlands	Sweden	Founded New Sweden
