= Cartographic expeditions to Greenland =

This is a list of recognised pioneering expeditions to Greenland that contributed to the cartography of the territory.

Expedition	Year(s)	Area	Leader
Third Northwest Passage Voyage	1578	South Greenland	Martin Frobisher
Danish Allday Expedition	1579	South Greenland	James Allday
Danish Heinason Expedition	1581	South Greenland	Magnus Heinason
John Davis' Expeditions to the Northwest Passage	1583–1587	Southwest Greenland	John Davis
Christian IV's Expeditions	1605–1607	Southeast Greenland	John Cunningham; Godske Lindenov; Carsten Richardson; James Hall
Hall Expedition	1612	Southwest Greenland	James Hall and William Baffin
English Button Expedition	1612–1613	Southwest Greenland	Josias Hubert
Baffin Expedition	1616	West Greenland	William Baffin
Walløe Expedition	1751–1753	Southeast Greenland	Peder Olsen Walløe
Ross Expedition	1818	Northwest Greenland	John Ross
Scoresby's Voyage to the Northern Whale-Fishery in the Baffin of Liverpool	1822	East Greenland	William Scoresby
Commissioners for the Discovery of the Longitude at Sea Expedition	1823	East Greenland	Douglas Charles Clavering and Edward Sabine
Graah Expedition	1828–1830	Southeast Greenland	W. A. Graah
La Lilloise Expedition	1833	Southeast Greenland	Jules de Blosseville
Inglefield Expedition	1852	Northwest Greenland	Edward Augustus Inglefield
First German North Polar Expedition	1868	Northeast Greenland	Carl Koldewey
Second German North Polar Expedition (Germania and Hansa)	1869–1870	Northeast Greenland	Carl Koldewey
British Arctic Expedition	1875–1876	North Greenland	George Nares
J. A. D. Jensen Expedition	1878	Inland ice in West Greenland	J. A. D. Jensen
Lady Franklin Bay Expedition	1881-1884	Nares Strait area in far northern Greenland	Adolphus Greely
Umiak Expedition	1883–1885	Southeast Greenland	Gustav Holm and Thomas Vilhelm Garde
Second Dickson expedition	1883	West Greenland and East Greenland at Ammasalik	Adolf Erik Nordenskiöld
Upernavik Mapping Expedition	1886–1887	Northwest Greenland	Carl Ryder
Nansen Expedition	1888	Across the inland ice	Fridtjof Nansen
Ryder's East Greenland Expedition	1891–1892	Scoresby Sund system	Carl Ryder
Peary's North Greenland Expeditions	1891–1892	North Greenland	Robert Peary
Swedish NW Greenland Expedition	1892	Northwest Greenland	Johan Alfred Björling
Peary's North Greenland Expeditions	1893–1895	North Greenland	Robert Peary
Ingolf Expedition	1895–1896	East Greenland	C.F. Wandel
Peary's Arctic Club Expedition	1898–1902	North Greenland	Robert Peary
Sverdrup Expedition	1898	Northwest Greenland	Otto Sverdrup
Carlsbergfund Expedition to East Greenland	1898–1900	Coast between Ammassalik Island and Scoresby Sound	G. C. Amdrup
Swedish Greenland Expedition to search for Andrée	1899	Northeast Greenland	Alfred Gabriel Nathorst
Literary Expedition	1902–1904	Northwest Greenland	Ludvig Mylius-Erichsen and Knud Rasmussen
Duke of Orléans Arctic Expedition	1905	Northeast Greenland	Prince Philippe, Duke of Orléans
Denmark expedition	1906–1908	Northeast Greenland	Ludvig Mylius-Erichsen
Alabama Expedition	1909–1912	Northeast Greenland	Ejnar Mikkelsen
First Thule Expedition	1912	North Greenland	Knud Rasmussen and Peter Freuchen
Second Swiss Expedition	1912	Across the inland ice	Alfred de Quervain
Danish Expedition to Queen Louise Land	1912–1913	Across the inland ice	J.P. Koch
Second Thule Expedition	1916–1918	North Greenland	Knud Rasmussen
Third Thule Expedition	1919	North Greenland	Knud Rasmussen
Fourth Thule Expedition	1919–1920	East Greenland	Knud Rasmussen
Bicentenary Jubilee Expedition	1921–1923	North Greenland	Lauge Koch
1929–1930 Expedition to East Greenland	1929–1930	Northeast Greenland	Lauge Koch
German Greenland Expedition	1930–1931	Across the inland ice	Alfred Wegener
British Arctic Air Route Expedition	1930–1931	East Greenland	Gino Watkins
Sixth Thule Expedition	1931	Northeast Greenland	Knud Rasmussen
1932–1933 Greenland expedition	1932–1933	East Greenland	Gino Watkins until his death, then John Rymill
Gefion Expedition	1932	Northeast Greenland	Johannes Gerhardt Jennov and Alf Trolle
Scoresby Sund Committee's 2nd East Greenland Expedition	1932	East Greenland	Ejnar Mikkelsen
Three-year Expedition to East Greenland	1931–1934	East Greenland	Lauge Koch
British East Greenland Expedition	1935–1936	East Greenland	Lawrence Wager
Cartographic Air Expedition	1938	North Greenland	Lauge Koch
Mørkefjord Expedition	1938–1939	Northeast Greenland	Eigil Knuth
Norwegian-French Expedition	1938–1939	Northeast Greenland	Gaston Micard
Danish Peary Land Expedition.	1947–1950	North Greenland	Eigil Knuth
British North Greenland Expedition	1952–1954	North and Northeast Greenland	James Simpson
1956–1958 Expedition to East Greenland	1958–1959	East Greenland	Lauge Koch

== See also ==
- Geography of Greenland
- Arctic exploration
- List of Arctic expeditions

== Bibliography ==
- Vahl, Martin; Amdrup, Georg Carl; Bobé, Louis; Jensen, Adolf Severin, eds. (1928). Greenland. Vol. 1. The Commission for the Direction of the Geological and Geographical Investigations in Greenland. LCCN 20000378.
