= John Jourdain =

John Jourdain (? – 17 July 1619), was a captain in the service of the English East India Company (EIC), and the first president of the EIC Council of India

== Life and career ==
He was the sixth child and fourth son of John Jourdain, a Lyme Regis based merchant and mayor of the town. By 1595 he was trading on his own account in the Azores but on 7 December 1607 he was engaged by the EIC as one of their factora at a salary of £3 per month plus £10 for "outfit".

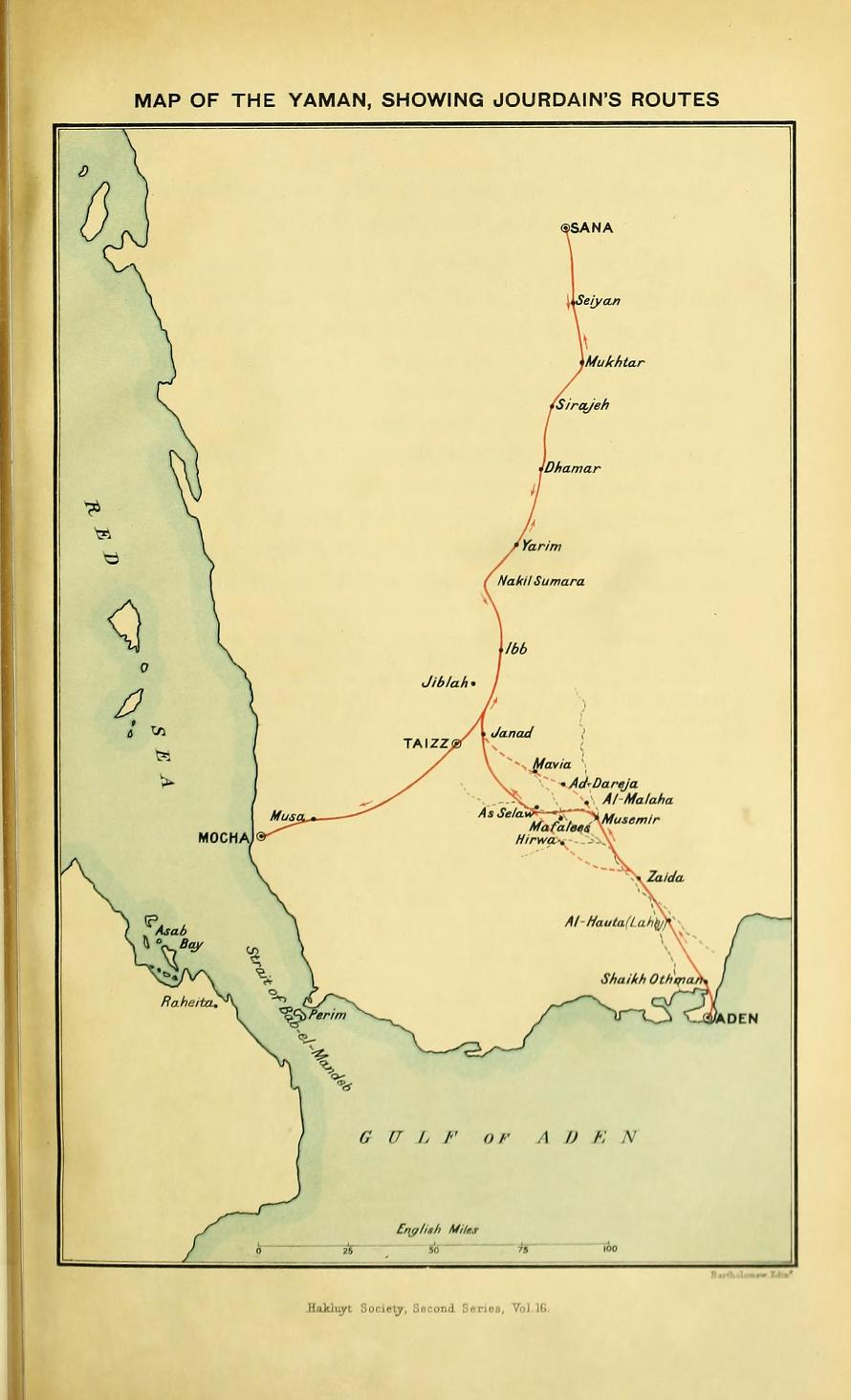
1609 travel route of Jordain in Yemen

He sailed for India in the Ascension on 25 March 1608 on the Company's Fourth Voyage of which Alexander Sharpeigh was the commander or general. After touching at the Cape of Good Hope, and visiting Aden, Mocha, and the island of Socotra, the Ascension sailed, towards the end of August 1609, for Surat, and on 3 September was lost on a shoal in the Gulf of Cambay. The crew reached Gandavee in the boats, and marched thence to Surat. A few days later most of them set out for Agra, but Jourdain remained at Surat, pushing the company's trade and conciliating the Indian officials. In January 1610–11 he joined Captain William Hawkins at Agra, and after six months' stay here he returned to Surat. In February 1611–12 he sailed for the Red Sea in the Trades Increase. From Mocha he went to Sumatra, and on to Tecoa and Bantam, where on 28 November 1617 he was appointed to remain as chief factor, or 'president of the English,' his work being not only to regulate the business of the company, but—which was more troublesome—to adjust the quarrels of his subordinates. The appointment was made at the behest of General Thomas Best, commander of the tenth voyage, with the consent of the other factors at Bantam. The appointment gave Jourdain authority over all of the Company's factories in the East except that of Surat, where Sir Thomas Roe held sway as special envoy to the Moghul Emperor Jahangir. The Dutch, too, were insolent and aggressive, and threatened to become more dangerous enemies than the Portuguese, with whom there had always been war.

Jourdain had intended to go home at the end of 1615, but the death of Captain Nicholas Downton delayed his return for a year. He arrived in England in the early summer of 1617, and in November entered into another agreement with the company for five years at a salary of £350 per annum, of which £50 was to be paid in England. Departing in February of the following year (O.S. 1618), he arrived in Bantam on 22 November 1619 By now the English and Dutch were at war in the Banda Islands with Nathaniel Courthope blockaded on the island of Run. After an attack on the Dutch Black Lion, their Governor-General, Jan Pieterszoon Coen burned down the English factory at Jakarta and a siege ensued with the English supporting the natives against the Dutch. As 'president of the council of India,' Jourdain refused to admit the authority claimed by Sir Thomas Dale as commander-in-chief. Dale's command, he insisted, was limited to the fleet he came out with, unless other ships were placed under his orders by the president and council: "The dissension and crossings between Sir Thos. Dale and Capt. Jourdain hath caused this calamity with the English in India, through their striving for superiority". The dispute seems to have been amicably settled. Dale was apparently already affected by the sickness which carried him off a few months later. Jordain departed in the Sampson, with the Hound in company, to arrange affairs at Patani.

== Death ==
On 2 June 1619, Jourdain anchored off Patani where he reorganised an English factory established seven years previously. Once matters were settled, he departed only to be pursued by a Dutch squadron dispatched by Coen. A battle began on 17 July and despite a spirited defence, after two hours the English hoisted a flag of truce and Jourdain went out on deck to talk to the Dutch commander, Henrick Johnson. According to the English account, "the Flemmings, (i.e. Dutch) espying him, most treacherously and cruelly shot at him with a musket, and shot him into the bodie neere the heart, of which wound hee dyed within halfe an houre after." The Dutch on the other hand claimed that the shooting was an accident. John was survived by siblings and a famous adventurer cousin, Silvester Jourdain.
