= Gerdrup =

Manor house near Skælskør, Denmark

General information
- Location: Gerdrupvej 135; 4230 Skælskør, Denmark
- Coordinates: 55°16′43.47″N 11°18′46.87″E
- Completed: 1866

Design and construction
- Architect: Rudolf Unmack

Gerdrup, formerly Gjerup, is a manor house and estate located three kilometres north of Skælskør, Slagelse Municipality, Denmark. The estate was from 1760 to 1919 owned by members of the Qvistgaard family and has since then been owned by the Fabricius family. The current main building is from 1866. It is now operated as a venue for meetings, parties and other events.

== History ==
=== Early history ===
In the 12th century, Gerdrup belonged to the now extinct Hvide family- The first recorded owner of Gerdrup is Jep Jensen Godov til Ordrup, who in 1417, together with his wife, Elnæ Pallesdatter, sold the estate to Anders Jacobsen Lunge. After Anders Jacobsen Lunge's death in 1429, the ownership of Gerdrup seems to have been spread out on more than one simultaneous owner. The estate was the subject of a legal dispute between Jørgen Rud, lensman of Saltø, and Jensen Sosadel Dyre. Christian I ended up ruling in favour of Dyre, who had claimed that Gerdrup had been "in the custody of him and his parents in 16 and 40 years". His daughter,

=== Stampe and Gundemark families, c. 1530–1655 ===
Anne Dyre, would later marry the squire Claus Hansen (Stampe). Their son, Søren Clausen Stampe, was the owner of Gerdrup in 1529. During the Count's Feud, in 1535, Gerdrup is in a cover letter listed as belonging to Knud Rud, but Søren Stampe is later once again mentioned as the owner.

After Stampe's death, Gerdrup passed to his son-in-law Peder Markvardsen Hundermark, who served in the Kalmar War (1611–13) under his uncle, Herluf Trolle, A great-grandson, Erik Hundermark, was the last male member of the Hundermark family. After his death, Gerdrup passed to his sisters, Eline and Anne Hundermark. Anne Hundermark married Frands Kaas. Ellen Hundermark married John Cunningham, a Scotsman who had served as captain of HDMS Trost on an expedition to Greenland. Another Scotsman, David Welwood, who is buried at Eggeslevmagle Church, may also have owned a stake in the estate.

=== Changing owners, 1643–1760 ===
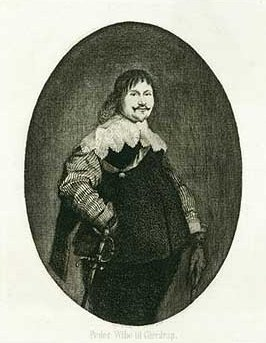
Peder Vibe

Im 1654, Hans Welwood and Lorens Cunningham sold the estate to Peder Vibe. Two years later they had to enter into a settlement with Claus Kaas, the heir of Frands Kaas, which required them to pay him 2,000 Danish rigsdaler for him to recognize the deed of 1654. Vibe was ennobled in 1634. In July 1848, he was appointed as royal treasurer (rentemester).

Vibe's widow, Anne Cathrine Budde, married Joachim Frederik Vind in 1662. He died right after the marriage and Gerdrup was then transferred to the widow of his brother vice chancellor Holger Vinds, Margrethe Gjedde. In 1693, she ceded it to her son-in-law, Diderich Grubbe. Grubbe and his wife expanded the estate through the acquisition of more land. Gerdrup was after their death sold in auction. It was acquired by their son, Holger Grubbe, a lieutenant. The following year he ceded it to his sister, Diderikke Elisabeth Grubbe. Another sister, Christiane Elisabeth Grubbe, seems also to have owned a share in the estate in around 1731.

In 1731, Christiane Harboe (née Fuiren) acquired the estate. She was the widow of former minister of war Jens Harboe. She was also the owner of Støvringgaard and Lyngbygaard.

Harboe died in 1735. A will created shortly prior to her death converted Støvringgård and her house in Copenhagen (now Det Harboeske Enkefruekloster) into refuges for widowed ladies. Gerdrup was sold at auction. The new owners were bailiff in Copenhagen Oluf Bruun and prefect Jørgen Willumsen. Bruun became the sole owner of the estate in 1739. In 1750, he sold it to chancery councilor Simon Borthuus. He once again expanded the estate with more land. He was succeeded on the estate by his brother, auditor-general Otto Borthuus. He sold it to major Caspar Frederik Bülow.

=== Qvistgaard family, 1760-1919 ===
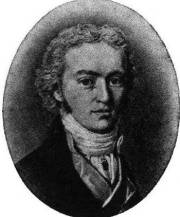
Peter Christofher Qvistgaard.

In 1760, Gerdrup was acquired by Morten Iversen Qvistgaard. He was also the owner of nearby Lyngbygård. In 1786, he became a member of the Great Land Commission. He was an enthusiastic defender of the great agricultural reforms of the time and implemented them on his estate. After his death, Gerdrup and Lyngbygård were both passed to his youngest son, Peter Christoffer Quistgaard. He was killed in the Battle of Køge in 1807. His widow, Henriette Elisabeth Schow, kept the estate after her husband's death.

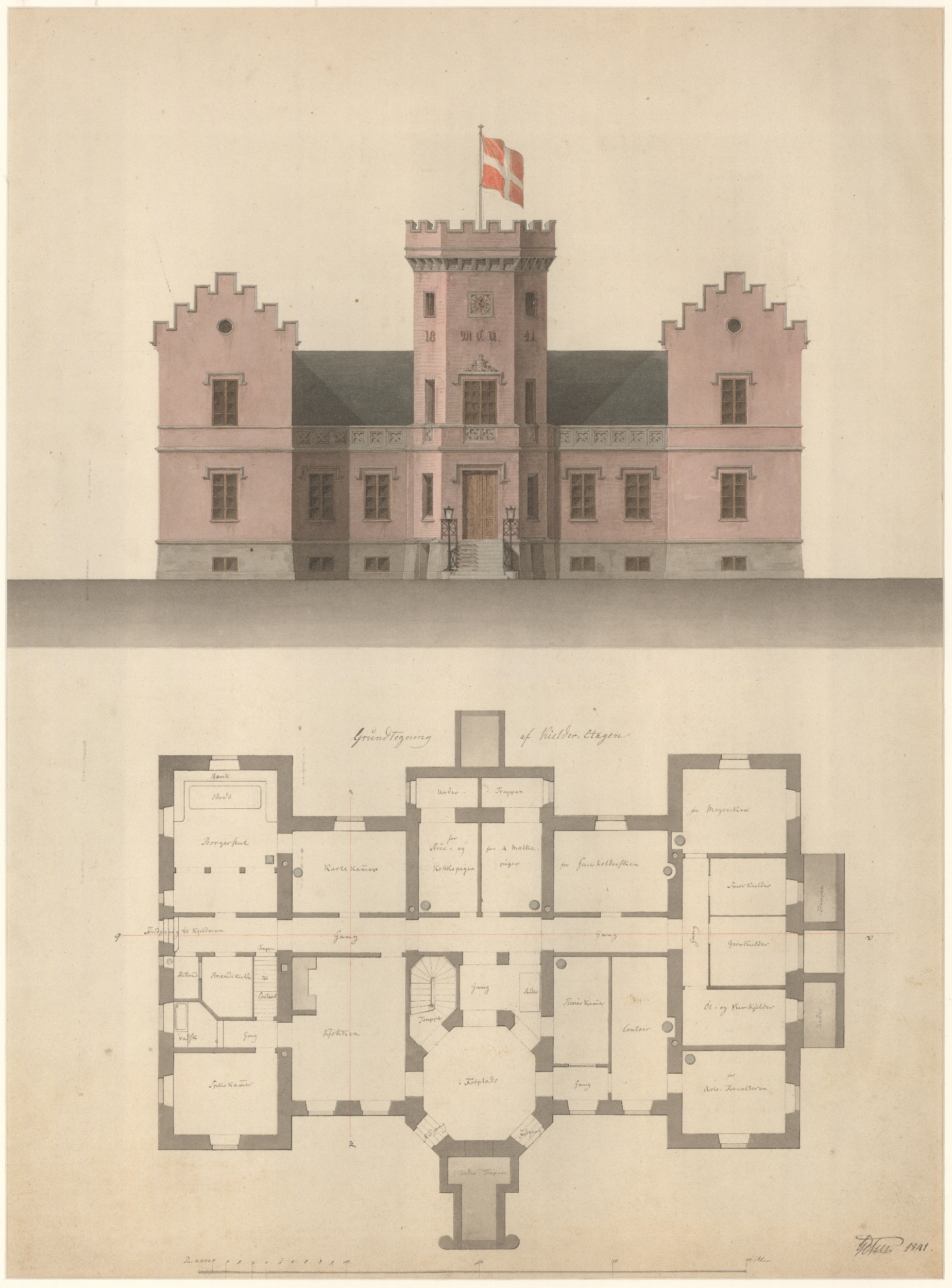
One of the two unrealized design proposals created by G. F. Hetsch in 1840-41-

Hetsch's other unrealized proposal.

In 1814, Henriette Elisabeth Schow married Peter Johansen de Neergaard but a prenuptual agreement secured both estates as her personal property. In 1831, she ceded the estate to her son, Morten Christen Qvistgaard while Lyngbygård and the so-called Gimlinge kirkegods went to two other sons. Morten Qvistgaard commissioned the architect Gustav Friedrich Hetsch to design a new main building. Hetsch created two design proposals, but Qvistgaard died before either of them was realized. His son, Victor Emilius Qvistgaard, who inherited the estate when he was just four years old, constructed a new main building from another design by Rudolf Unmack in 1864–66. In 1870, he ceded Gerdrup to his son. Viggo Johan Qvistgaard.

=== Fabricius family, 1919–present ===
Viggo Johan Qvistgaard's heirs sold the estate to Holger Fabricius. He had already inherited Lyngbygaard after his mother, Tofa Alvilda Fabricius (née Qvistgaard).. Fabricius' widow, Kirstine Feiring, ceded Gerdrup to her son Peter Frederik Fabricius in 1953. Peter Nicolai Fabricius Melchior inherited the estate in 1987.,

== Architecture ==
Rendering for the main building, 1872

.

The current, two-storey main building from 1864 to 1866 is a simple, red brick building. The roof is a black-glazed tile roof.

== Today ==
The main building is now operated as a venue for meetings and other events.

== List of owners ==
- ( -1417) Jep Jensen Godov
- (1417-1429) Anders Jacobsen Lunge
- (1429-1475) Ejere ukendt
- ( -1475) Jørgen Rud
- (1475-1495) Erik Jensen Dyre
- (1495- ) Claus Hansen
- ( -1535) Søren Clausen Stampe
- (1535- ) Knud Rud
- ( -1558) Søren Clausen Stampe
- (1558-1571) Peder Markvardsen Hundermark
- (1571-1593) Claus Hundermark
- (1593-1611) Peder Hundermark
- (1593-1611) Iver Hundermark
- (1593-1617) Erik Hundermark
- (1617- ) Frans Kaas
- (1617-1625) Ellen Hundermark, gift Cunningham
- (1625- ) John Cunningham
- ( -1651) David Welwood
- ( -1654) Lorents Cunningham
- ( -1654) Hans Welwood
- ( -1656) Claus Kaas
- (1654-1658) Peder Vibe
- (1658-1662) Anna Cathrine Budde, gift 1) Vibe, 2) Vind
- ( -1662) Hans Ribolt
- (1662-1687) Joachim Frederik Vind
- (1687-1693) Margrethe Gjedde, gift Vind
- (1693-1702) Diderich Grubbe
- (1702-1727) Anne Elisabeth Vind, gift Grubbe
- (1727-1728) Boet efter Anne Elisabeth Vind
- (1728-1729) Holger Grubbe
- (1729-1731) Diderikke E. Grubbe
- ( -1731) Christiane E. Grubbe
- (1731-1735) Christine Harboe (née Fuiren)
- (1735-1737) Boet efter Christine Fuiren
- (1737-1739) Jørgen Willumsen
- (1739-1750) Oluf Bruun
- (1750-1755) Simon Borthuus
- (1755-1756) Otto Borthuus
- (1756-1760) Casper Frederik Bülow
- (1760-1798) Morten Iversen Qvistgaard
- (1798-1807) Peter Christoffer Qvistgaard
- (1807-1814) Anna Henriette Schow, gift 1) Qvistgaard, 2) de Neergaard
- (1814-1831) Peter Johansen de Neergaard
- (1831-1842) Morten Christen Qvistgaard
- (1842-1893) Victor Emilius Qvistgaard
- (1893-1919) Viggo Johan Qvistgaard
- (1919-1930) Holger Fabricius
- (1930-1953) Kirstine Feyring, gift Fabricius
- (1953-1975) Peter Frederik Fabricius
- (1975-1987) Peter Fabricius
- * (1993- ) Peter Nicolai Fabricius Melchior
