= Den Røde Løve =

Dano-Norwegian naval vessel

History

Denmark-Norway
- Name: Den Røde Løve
- In service: 1596
- Out of service: 1613

General characteristics
- Tons burthen: 70 tons
- Complement: 48 men
- Armament: 6 guns

Den Røde Løve (Note: Four ships are listed in the Danish Naval Museum Skibregister with the name Røde Løve - this one from 1596 and later ones from 1611, 1622 and 1666 - but without further details) was a 70-ton ship of the Dano-Norwegian navy. It served during the early 17th century, when it was recorded as carrying 6 guns.

The name is Danish for "The Red Lion"; it was also known as Løven ("the Lion").

The ship was considered slow and ill-equipped for sailing close to the wind. It was considered an older ship on a naval list from 1611.

Den Røde Løve participated together with HDMS Katten and HDMS Trost in John Cunningham'sto expedition to Greenland in 1605. The following year Den røde Løve was again set to Greenland on Godske Lindenov's expedition and with Cunningham as captain. These expeditions had been organized by King Christian IV in order to reestablish contact with the lost Norse settlements on Greenland and then to exploit the silver and gold ore supposedly returned by the first expedition. There was a third expedition in 1607, but Den Røde Løve was not sent.

Participated in the Kalmar War (1611-1613).

== See also ==
- Christian IV's expeditions to Greenland
- Dano-Norwegian Navy
- Danish colonization of Greenland
