= Lindenow =

Lindenow may refer to:

== Places ==
- Lindenow, Victoria, a town in Australia

== People ==
- Lindenov family, Danish noble family
- Godske Lindenov, a Danish naval officer and Arctic explorer who led one of Christian IV's expeditions to Greenland
