= HDMS Søehesten =

History

Denmark–Norway
- Name: Søehesten
- Owner: Royal Dano-Norwegian Navy
- Builder: Stibolt
- Commissioned: 1795
- Stricken: 14:30 2 April 1801

General characteristics
- Class & type: barge
- Complement: 178

Søehesten ("The Seahorse") was an 18-gun barge (in Danish: defensionspram) of the Royal Dano-Norwegian Navy, commissioned in 1795. During the Battle of Copenhagen on 2 April 1801, it was commanded by Lieutenant (Danish: Premierløjtnant) B. U. Middelboe with a complement of 178 sailors. 12 of the ship's crew were killed in the battle, and 21 wounded. The ship struck its colours at 14.30.

== Citations ==
- T. A. Topsøe-Jensen og Emil Marquard (1935) “Officerer i den dansk-norske Søetat 1660-1814 og den danske Søetat 1814-1932" (Danish Naval Officers)
