= John Knight (seafarer) =

British explorer and seafarer (born c. 1585)

- Born: c. 1585
- Disappeared: 26 June 1606 (aged c. 21); Labrador
- Cause of death: Presumed homicide
- Occupation: Explorer
- Known for: Exploring Greenland and Labrador

John Knight (born c. 1585, disappeared 26 June 1606) was a British explorer of Greenland and Labrador. He is known for two expeditions: he was a member of a Danish exploration of the coast of Greenland, and he led an expedition to discover the Northwest Passage, during which he was lost.

== Greenland ==
In 1605, Knight took part in a Danish expedition to Greenland, led by John Cunningham with James Hall as pilot. Knight captained the pinnace Katten. They sailed from Copenhagen on 2 May. On 30 May, at latitude 59° 50′, they sighted high land, which they called Cape Christian, but the ice prevented them from reaching it. On 12 June, they sighted high land on the west coast of Greenland, and named Cape Anna after Anne of Denmark, wife of James I, Cape Sophia after her mother, King Christian's Fjord, and Cunningham Fjord, in latitude 67° 10′. Some small islands off Cape Sophia were named Knight's Islands. This is apparently the extent of their voyage, of which few particulars have been preserved. They returned to Copenhagen in August.

== Labrador ==
In England in the following year he was employed on a joint venture of the Muscovy and East India Companies to find the Northwest Passage. In the Hopewell of forty tons he sailed from Gravesend, Kent, on 18 April 1606, and, leaving the Orkney Islands on 12 May, fell in with a large ice field, and after a long passage made the coast of Labrador, in about lat. 57°, on 19 June. Knight intended to explore the coast during the summer, and to winter ashore.

The ice was still very troublesome, and after pushing through it for a couple of days the Hopewell anchored. In a violent gale on 23 and 24 June, probably near Nain, the cables parted and the ship drove ashore. She got afloat again, but her rudder was torn off, and she was making a great deal of water. Gorrell, the mate, was sent on shore to look for a place where she could be beached for repairs; he was unsuccessful, so on the next day, 26 June, Knight went himself with Gorrell and four men.

Leaving two men in the boat, Knight and his three companions went inland over a hill and were never seen again. It was concluded that they were killed by local people. The survivors on board repaired the ship as they best could, with some opposition from local people, and so reached Newfoundland, from where they sailed on 22 August, and arrived at Dartmouth, Devon on 24 September.

== See also ==
- List of solved missing person cases (pre-1950)
- List of unsolved murders (before 1900)
