= Cape J. A. D. Jensen =

Headland in Sermersooq, Greenland

Cape J.A.D. Jensen Kap J.A.D. Jensen
- Cape
- Coordinates: 68°10′N 29°48′W
- Location: Sermersooq, Greenland
- Offshore water bodies: North Atlantic Ocean

Area
  - Total: Arctic

Cape J.A.D. Jensen (Danish: Kap J.A.D. Jensen) is a headland in the North Atlantic Ocean, east Greenland, Sermersooq municipality. This cape is named after J. A. D. Jensen (1849 - 1936), an officer of the Danish Navy and Arctic explorer.

== Geography ==
Cape J.A.D. Jensen is located on Sokongen Island, between the Nansen Fjord and the J.A.D. Jensen Fjord, 15 km to the WSW of Cape Nansen, north of which the Greenland Sea begins. The island lies in an indented area of the eastern Greenland coast where there is a succession of rocky headlands with active glaciers in between.

This headland is a massive basalt promontory with steep dark cliffs rising almost 1,000 m over the waters of the Greenland Sea.

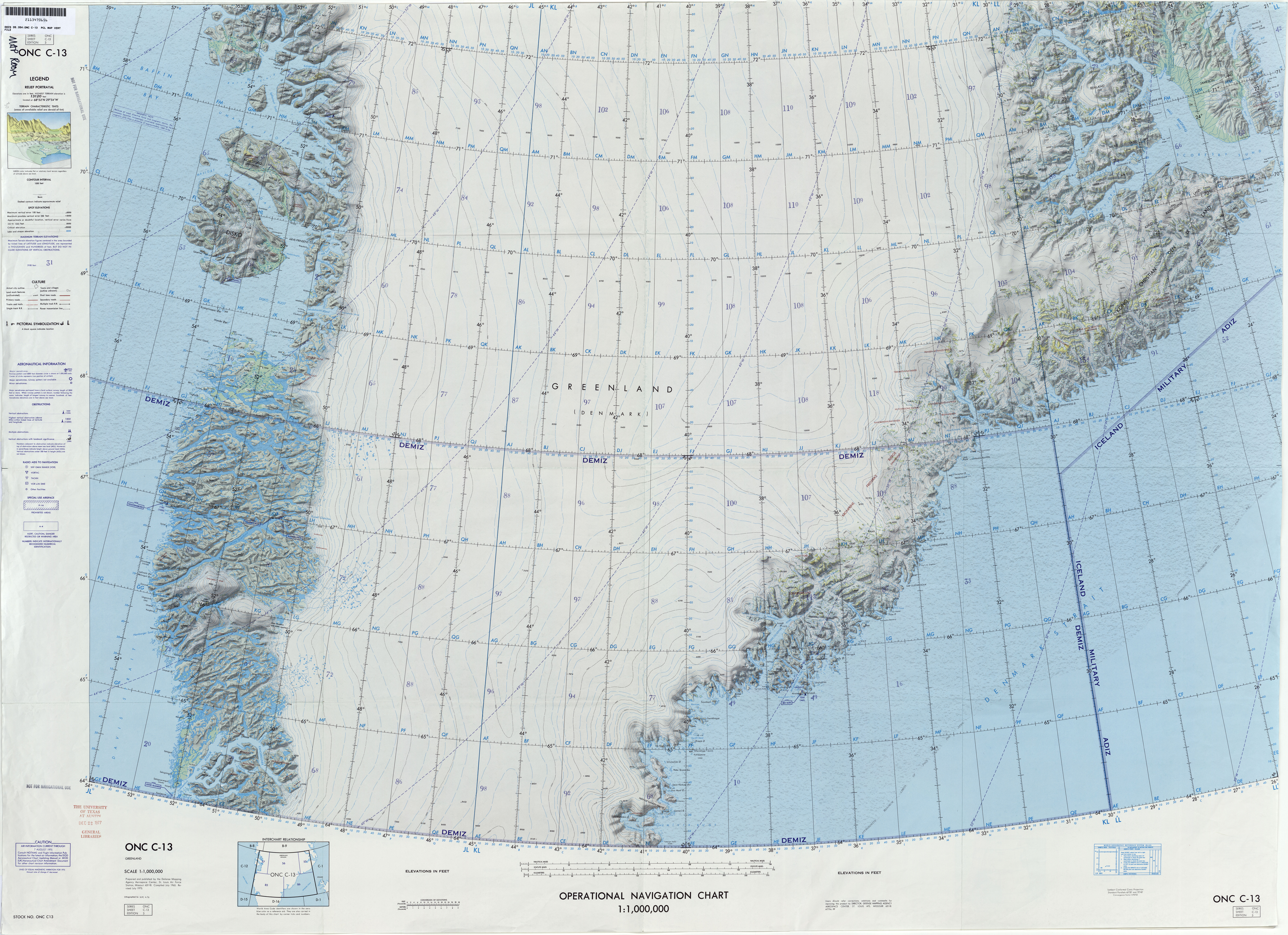
Map of Greenland section.
