= Sokongen Island =

Island in Greenland

Sokongen
Søkongen Ø
- Location within Greenland

Geography
- Location: Greenland Sea
- Coordinates: 68°10′N 30°45′W
- Area: 115 km^{2} (44 sq mi)

Administration
- Greenland
- Municipality: Sermersooq

Demographics
- Demonym: None (uninhabited)
- Population: 0

Sokongen (Danish: Søkongen Ø) is an island in the Sermersooq municipality, in eastern Greenland.

== Geography ==
Sokongen is a coastal island that lies between the Nansen Fjord to the northeast and the J.A.D. Jensen Fjord to the southwest. It is located in an indented area of the eastern Greenland shore where there is a succession of headlands with active glaciers in between.

The island is 26 kilometres (16 miles) in length and its maximum width is 15 kilometres (9 miles). Its SE headland is Cape J.A.D. Jensen (68°10'N., 29°48'W.), a massive rocky promontory with steep dark basalt cliffs rising almost 1,000 over the sea, located 15 km to the SW of Cape Nansen.

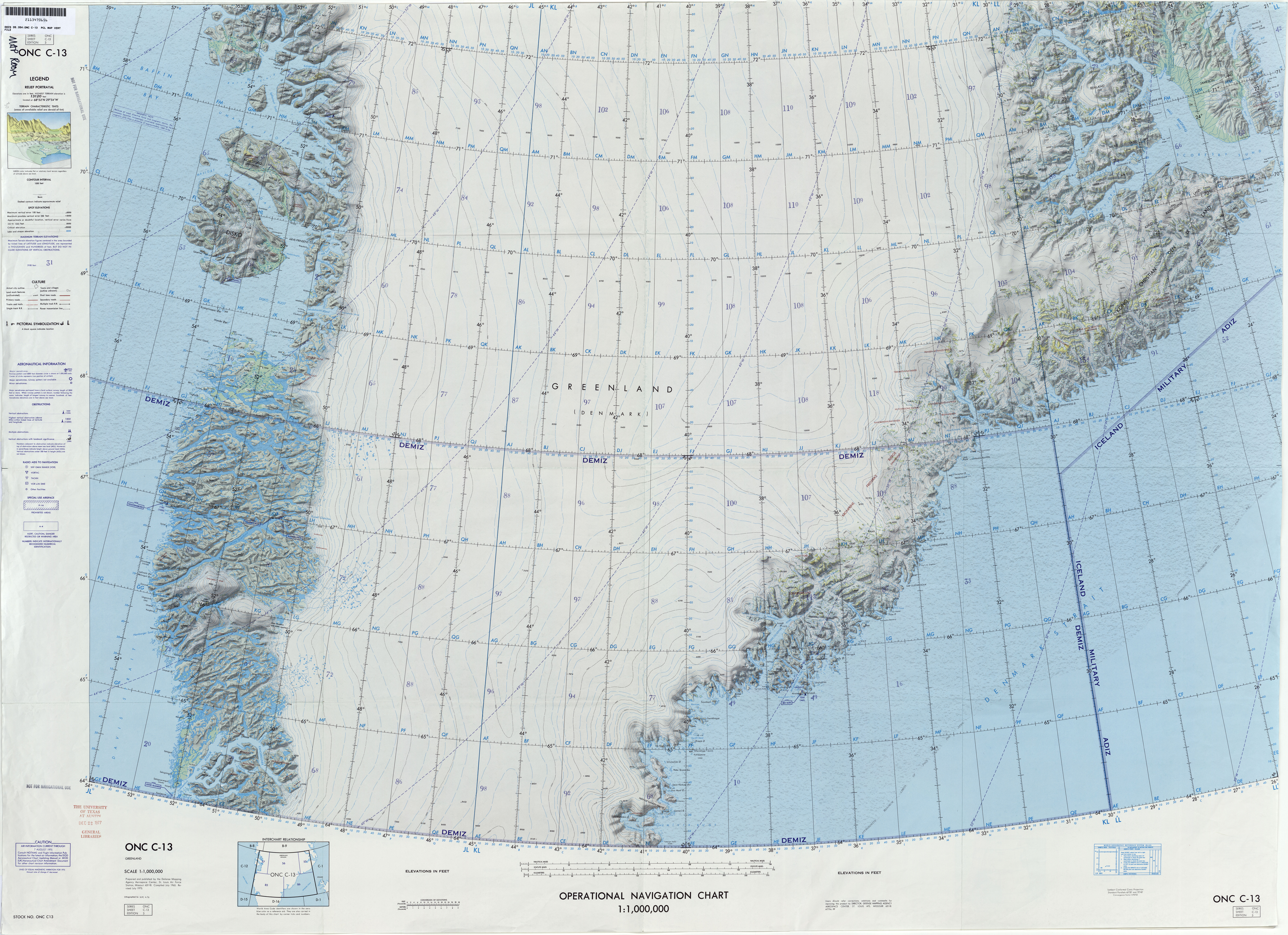
Map of Greenland section.

== See also ==
- List of islands of Greenland
