= Nansen Fjord =

Fjord on Blosseville Coast, Greenland

- Location in Greenland
- Location: Arctic
- Coordinates: 68°18′N 29°53′W
- Ocean/sea sources: Denmark Strait
- Basin countries: Greenland
- Max. width: 12 kilometres (7.5 mi)

Nansen Fjord is a fjord in King Christian IX Land, Eastern Greenland. It is part of the Sermersooq municipality.

== Geography ==
This fjord lies in an indented area of the Blosseville Coast where there is a succession of rocky headlands with active glaciers in between. Its mouth lies between Cape J.A.D. Jensen on Sokongen Island to the west and Cape Nansen to the east. Most of the fjord is filled by the Christian IV Glacier at its head.

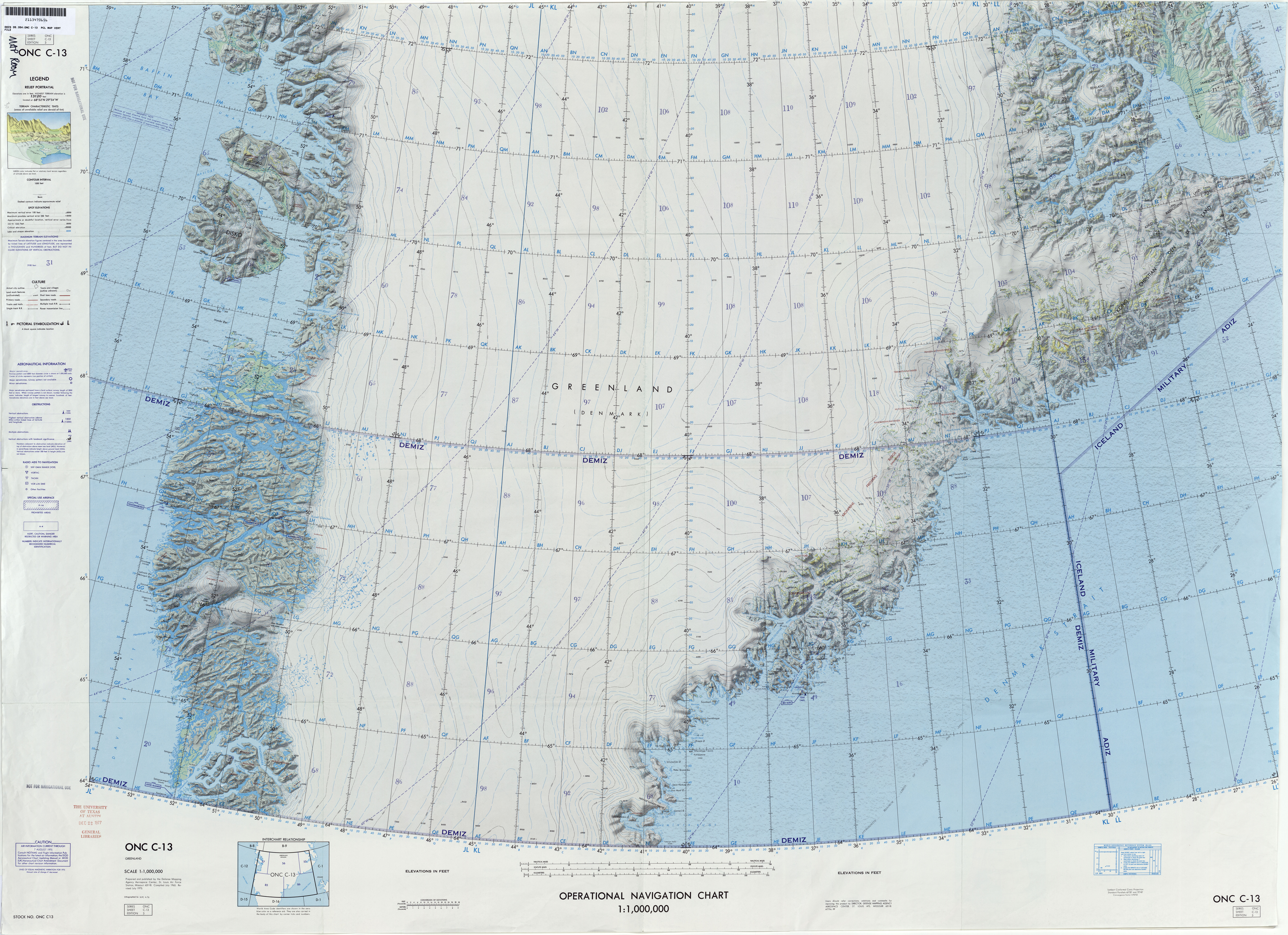
Map of Greenland section

== See also ==
- List of fjords of Greenland
