= Alexander Sharpeigh =

- Military career
- Allegiance: East India Company
- Rank: Captain
- Commands: Ascension

Alexander Sharpeigh (fl. 1607–1613), was an English merchant and sea-captain.

== Career ==
He seems to have been in the opening years of the seventeenth century a factor of the Levant Company at Constantinople, in which capacity he probably acquired some knowledge of Arabic. Early in 1608 he was appointed by the East India Company to be captain of their ship Ascension, and general or commander of the fourth voyage to the East Indies. The two ships, Ascension and Union (captained by Richard Rowles), sailed from Woolwich on 14 March 1607–8, and from Plymouth on the 31st. Touching at Grand Canary and at the Cape Verde Islands, they arrived on 14 July in Saldanha, (Table Bay). There they remained till 20 September, when they sailed to the eastward; but the night coming on stormy and dark, the two ships lost sight of each other and did not again meet. Touching on the way at the Comoro Islands, at Pemba, where her men had a severe conflict with the natives and some white Moors, and at Almirante, the Ascension came to Socotra on 29 March 1609, and on 10 April crossed over to Aden, where the governor, having invited Sharpeigh on shore, as though to a conference, kept him and his attendants close prisoners for six weeks, and released them only on payment of goods to the value of two thousand five hundred dollars. Getting away from Aden without further attempt to trade, Sharpeigh went to Mocha, where there was "a good market for English commodities." Thence he returned to Socotra in August and sailed for Surat.

On 28 August the ship arrived at Mowa, where they could have got a pilot for Surat for twenty dollars. The master, however, refused, saying that he was able to take the ship in himself. On the 29th he tried it, missed the channel, and stuck the ship on the bar, where in three days she broke up. With some difficulty the men got on shore to Gandevi, where they were kindly received by the governor. On 9 September they reached Surat, but were not allowed into the town. They remained in a neighbouring village till the end of the month, and then set out for Agra, which Sharpeigh, deserted by most of his men, reached almost alone after a tedious journey, and was well received by William Hawkins, then residing in that place. In October 1611 he embarked on board the Trades Increase at Surat, with Sir Henry Middleton. It would seem that in 1613 he was agent for the company at Bantam, but the notice is vague, and his name does not occur again.

== Attribution ==
This article incorporates text from a publication now in the public domain: "Sharpeigh, Alexander". Dictionary of National Biography. London: Smith, Elder & Co. 1885–1900.
