= William Baffin =

English navigator, explorer and cartographer (1584–1622)

- Born: c. 1584; London, England
- Died: 23 January 1622; Qeshm Island, Ormus
- Occupations: Navigator, explorer, cartographer

William Baffin (c. 1584 – 23 January 1622) was an English navigator, explorer and cartographer. He is best known for his attempt to find the Northwest Passage from the Atlantic to Pacific oceans, during which Baffin became the first European to discover a bay which was subsequently named in his honour.

== Life ==
Nothing is known about Baffin's early life. An estimated year of birth, 1584, originated in the Encyclopædia Britannica in the 19th century, but without known documentary support. It has been conjectured that he was born to a humble station in London and gradually raised himself through his diligence and perseverance. In printing his journals, Samuel Purchas wrote of him as a "learned-unlearned Mariner and Mathematician... wanting art of words" who "really employed himself to those industries, whereof here you see so evident fruits." (Note: Cited in the Dictionary of Canadian Biography.)

His earliest mention occurs in 1612, when he was chief pilot on Captain James Hall's 4th expedition to Greenland. Hall's three earlier explorations had been underwritten by Christian IV, the king of Denmark–Norway anxious to reestablish contact with the Norse settlements there. It was still unknown that they had been overrun by the Inuit centuries before, but after the third failed expedition, Christian abandoned the project. Hall then successfully interested four English merchants—Thomas Smythe, James Lancaster, William Cockayne, and Richard Ball—in permitting him to continue his work. Baffin and Hall sailed from the Humber aboard Patience on 22 April, (Note: Baffin's journal of this voyage, however, begins on 8 July.) accompanied by Heart's Ease. During this voyage, Captain Hall was killed by the Inuit on the west coast of Greenland, but Baffin successfully returned to Hull on 11 September under the new captain Andrew Barker.

Over the next two years, Baffin served in the Muscovy Company-controlled whale-fishery off Spitzbergen. During the 1613 season, he served under Captain Benjamin Joseph as pilot of Tiger, the flagship of the 7-vessel whaling fleet. In 1614, he and Joseph served on Thomasine, amid a fleet of 11 ships and 2 pinnaces. Icy conditions precluded exploration to the north, but Baffin examined a "considerable portion" of Spitzbergen's coast, returning to London on 4 October.

In 1615, he entered the service of the "Company of Merchants of London, Discoverers of the North-West Passage", which had been established in 1612. Its first governor was Thomas Smythe, one of the underwriters of Hall's fourth voyage. (Note: Other prominent members of the company included James Lancaster, Francis Jones, Dudley Digges, and John Wolstenholme.) (Note: The previous 3 seasons of exploration had been led by, respectively, Henry Hudson (who was marooned by his men after a winter trapped in Hudson Bay), Thomas Button (who stayed near Churchill), and William Gibbons (who stayed on the Labrador coast).) Baffin served as pilot of Discovery, which left England under Captain Robert Bylot on 15 March. It carefully explored Hudson Strait in search of a Northwest Passage from the North Atlantic to the Far East. The accuracy of Baffin's tidal and astronomical observations on this voyage was confirmed when William Edward Parry passed over the same ground in 1821.

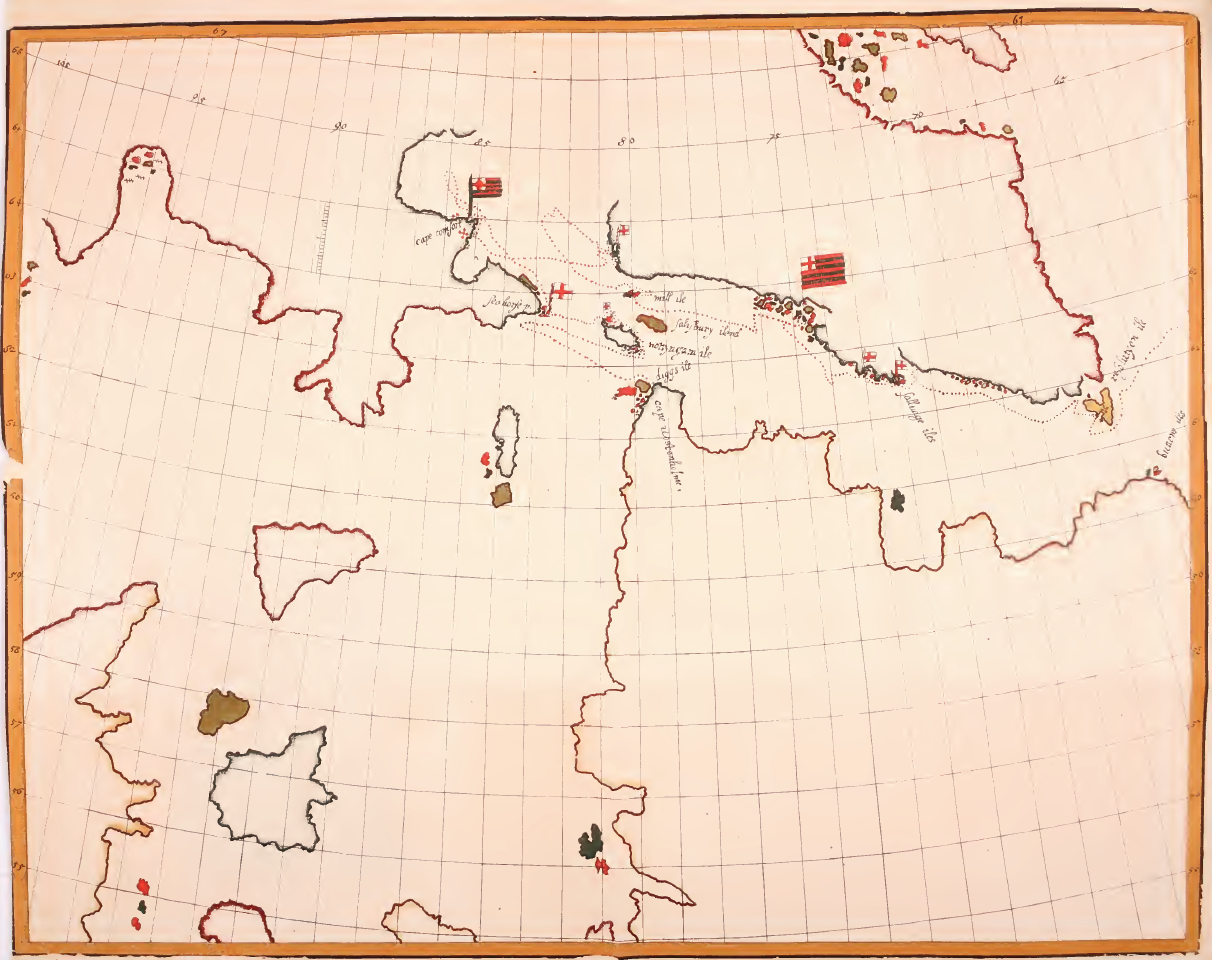
William Baffin's chart of the Hudson Strait.

In 1616, Baffin again sailed as the pilot of Discovery. Leaving Gravesend on 26 March, he passed west of Greenland up the Davis Strait, discovering the large bay to its north which now bears his name, together with a series of sounds which radiate from its head and were named by him after members of the North-West Passage Company: Lancaster, Smith, and Jones.

On this voyage, he sailed over 300 statute miles (480 km) farther north than his predecessor John Davis: since his voyages seemed to preclude hope of an ice-free nautical path to the Orient, the area was not explored again for two centuries. His furthest north (about 77° 45′ N) remained unsurpassed in North America until the Royal Navy officer Edward Augustus Inglefield reached 78° 28′ N in the same area in 1852.

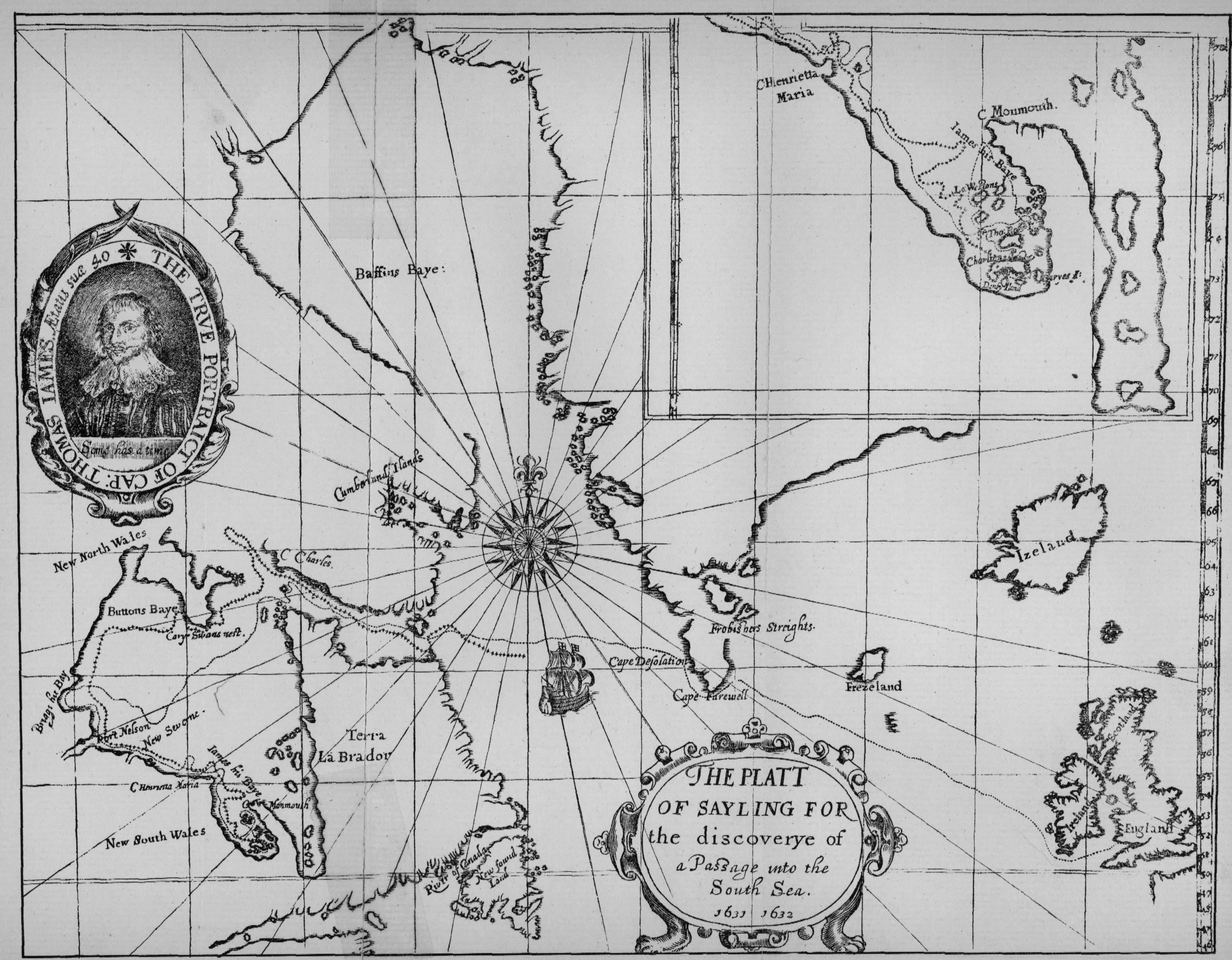
A map of a voyage undertaken by Thomas James, with Baffin Bay based on Baffin's charts. Baffin's cartography appears accurate, and clearly identifies the shape of the bay.

With the abandonment of projects for the Northwest Passage, Baffin took service with the East India Company, possibly with the intent of eventually discovering the passage from the western end. He left as master's mate to Andrew Shilling, captain of Anne Royal, on 4 February 1617. The fleet – under the command of Captain Martin Pring – reached Saldanha Bay in South Africa on 21 June and Surat in British India in September. Baffin's ship then performed separate service on runs to Mokha in Yemen and other ports of the Red Sea and Persian Gulf. Upon his return to London in September 1619, the company granted him special recognition for the valuable charts he had made during the course of his voyage.

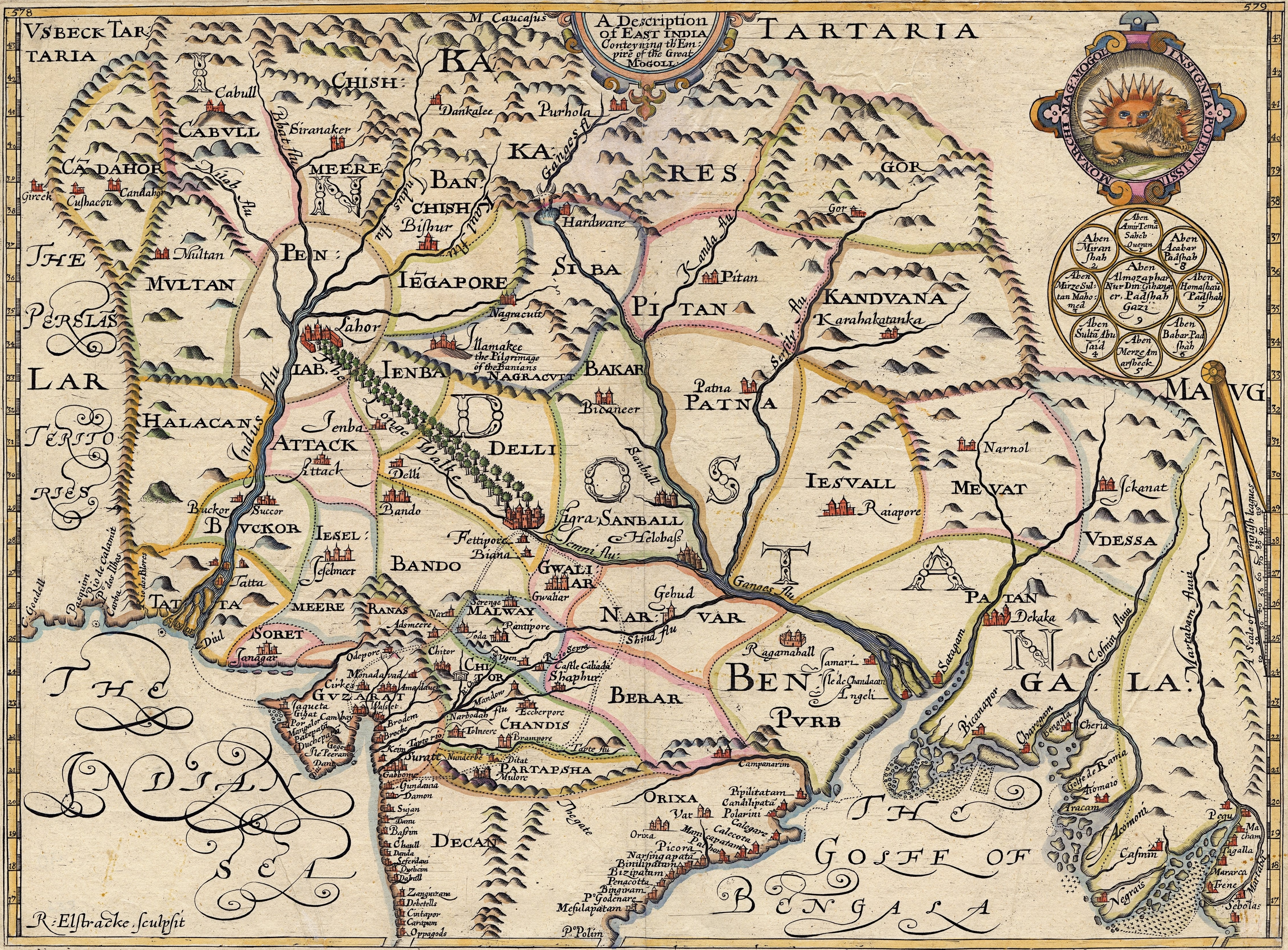
A map of northern India attributed to Baffin, published in 1625, after his death. This map was drawn after intelligence from the Mughal court was passed to Sir Thomas Roe, the current ambassador, who then passed the intelligence on to Baffin in 1619.

In 1620, he sailed east again as master of London on the special recommendation of Capt. Shilling, the commander of the expedition. Baffin left the Downs on 25 March and reached Suvali Beach near Surat in India on 9 November. Hearing of a joint Portuguese and Dutch fleet searching for them, Shilling went in search of them: he was wounded in battle in the Gulf of Oman on 28 December and died on 6 January 1621.

In 1622, the East India Company agreed to join the Persian assaults on the Portuguese fortresses on the islands of Qeshm and Hormuz in exchange for certain trade concessions. At Qeshm off Bandar Abbas, he was sent ashore on 23 January 1622 to take measurements of the height and distance of the walls of Fort Queixome to assist the fleet's gunners. One of his contemporaries described his death:

Master Baffin went on shoare with his Geometricall Instruments, for the taking of the height and distance of the Castle wall, for the better levelling of his peece to make his shot; but, as he was about the same, he received a small shot from the Castle into his belly, wherewith he gave three leapes, and died immediately.

He was one of few English casualties. The garrison swiftly surrendered, and Anglo-Persian control of Qeshm permitted the swift conquest of Ormuz, opening Persia to direct trade.

His wife – reckoned a "troublesome, impatient woman" (Note: Cited in the Dictionary of Canadian Biography.) – forced the East India Company into court over her husband's wages and other claims. Three years later, a settlement of £500 was agreed upon.

== Legacy ==
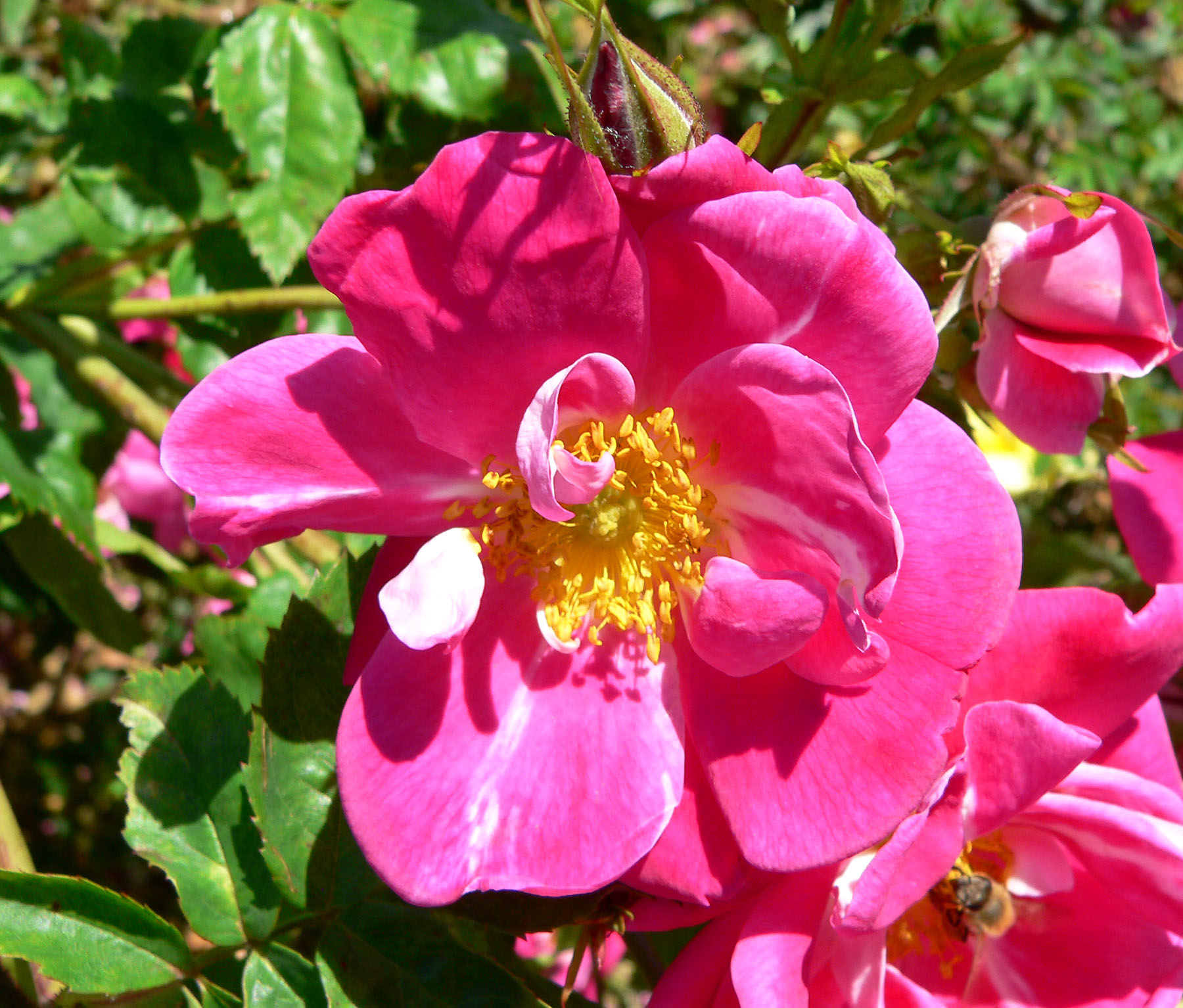
A William Baffin rose

Baffin Bay and Baffin Island were named in William Baffin's honour, and he is responsible for the names of several of their features. His journals were the only account of several of his voyages. Excerpts were printed by Samuel Purchas in 1625, but Baffin's charts and hydrographic observations were omitted owing to the expense involved.

All but one were subsequently lost, and in time Baffin's discoveries came to be doubted. He was, however, a hero to the explorer John Ross, who led an expedition in 1818 that confirmed Baffin's account in almost all particulars.

Besides his geographical discoveries, Baffin is celebrated for the scrupulous accuracy of his many scientific and magnetic observations. His reckoning of longitude at sea by lunar distances on 26 April 1615 is the first of its kind on record.

He is the namesake of the William Baffin rose.

== See also ==
- Samuel Purchas
- Blackburn Baffin
