= History of the Danish navy =

Dano-Norwegian navy
- Coat of arms of Denmark
- Active: 1510–1814
- Disbanded: 12 April 1814
- Country: Denmark–Norway
- Allegiance: King of Denmark-Norway
- Type: Navy
- Role: Coastal defence and fortification Naval warfare
- Size: 19,000 personnel (1709) 471 Ships (1808)
- Part of: Danish military
- H/Q: Holmen, Copenhagen
- Mottos: Gud og den retfærdige sag ("God and the just cause")
- Colours: Red & White
- Engagements: See list: Swedish War of Liberation Count's Feud Northern Seven Years' War Kalmar War Torstenson War Northern War (1655–1660) Scanian War Danish–Algerian War Great Northern War Battle of Copenhagen (1801) Battle of Copenhagen (1807) Gunboat War

Commanders
- Notable Comm.: See list: Søren Norby Peter Tordenskjold Henrik Bjelke Niels Juel Cort Adeler

Insignia
- Naval Ensign (1625–1814)

The history of the Danish navy began with the founding of a joint Dano-Norwegian navy on 10 August 1510, when King John appointed his vassal Henrik Krummedige to become "chief captain and head of all our captains, men and servants whom we now have appointed and ordered to be at sea".

The joint fleet was dissolved when Christian Fredrick established separate fleets for Denmark and Norway on 12 April 1814. These are the modern ancestors of today's Royal Danish Navy and Royal Norwegian Navy.

== Task of the navy ==
The primary task of the fleet in the first period of its existence was to counter the power of the Hanseatic League and secure control in the Baltic Sea. The fleet was expanded to be one of the largest in Europe under the direction Christian IV with 50-105 larger warships and a large number of brigs and sloops, numbering in total around 75. In the 17th and 18th centuries during the period of absolutism its primary aim was to control the Strait of Øresund against the Swedish Empire. In this period it consisted of 45 ships of the line with an average of 60 guns, plus 20-40 frigates, large enough to counter the Royal Swedish Navy at the time. The number of guns on the ships of the line was smaller, a feature only the Dano-Norwegian navy had- different from the average number of cannons mounted on warships of the great sea powers of the time but it was partly a deliberate decision of the admiralty, in order to make the ships able to navigate in the countless narrow waters around the Danish isles. The Napoleonic Wars also saw the construction of nearly 200 gunboats during the Gunboat War with the United Kingdom after the British decisively defeated the Dano-Norwegian fleet and captured their entire navy. The Bille Family with Steen Andersen Bille had a large role in the reconstruction of the Dano-Norwegian fleet.

The navy was considered to be the King's personal property, and "the King's waters" consisted of the sea off Denmark, Norway the Faroe Islands, Iceland and Greenland, large parts of the Baltic, the waters east of the North Cape and off Spitsbergen. For the entire period of its existence its main base was Holmen in Copenhagen, but on different occasions smaller task forces was stationed in Fredriksvern in Norway and in Glückstadt.

== Navy personnel ==
In 1709 there was about 19,000 personnel enrolled in the common fleet. Of these 10 000 were Norwegian. When Tordenskjold made his raid at Dynekil in 1716, over 80% of the sailors and 90% of the soldiers were Norwegian.

During peacetime most of the navy personnel served in the merchant fleet, which was of considerable size in the 18th century. The main problem for Denmark-Norway in case of war was thus often to round up the required number of skilled sailors for the navy.

The navy was for a large part funded by Norwegian means as a royal resolution dictated that the income from Norway was to be used towards its construction and upkeep.

The majority of the ships of the line in the 17th and 18th centuries were named after the royalty of Denmark-Norway, as well as the lands of the kingdoms. At the end of the 18th century, it became more common to name them in a national romantic vein, using names from the history of Denmark and from the Old Norse mythology.

== Ships ==
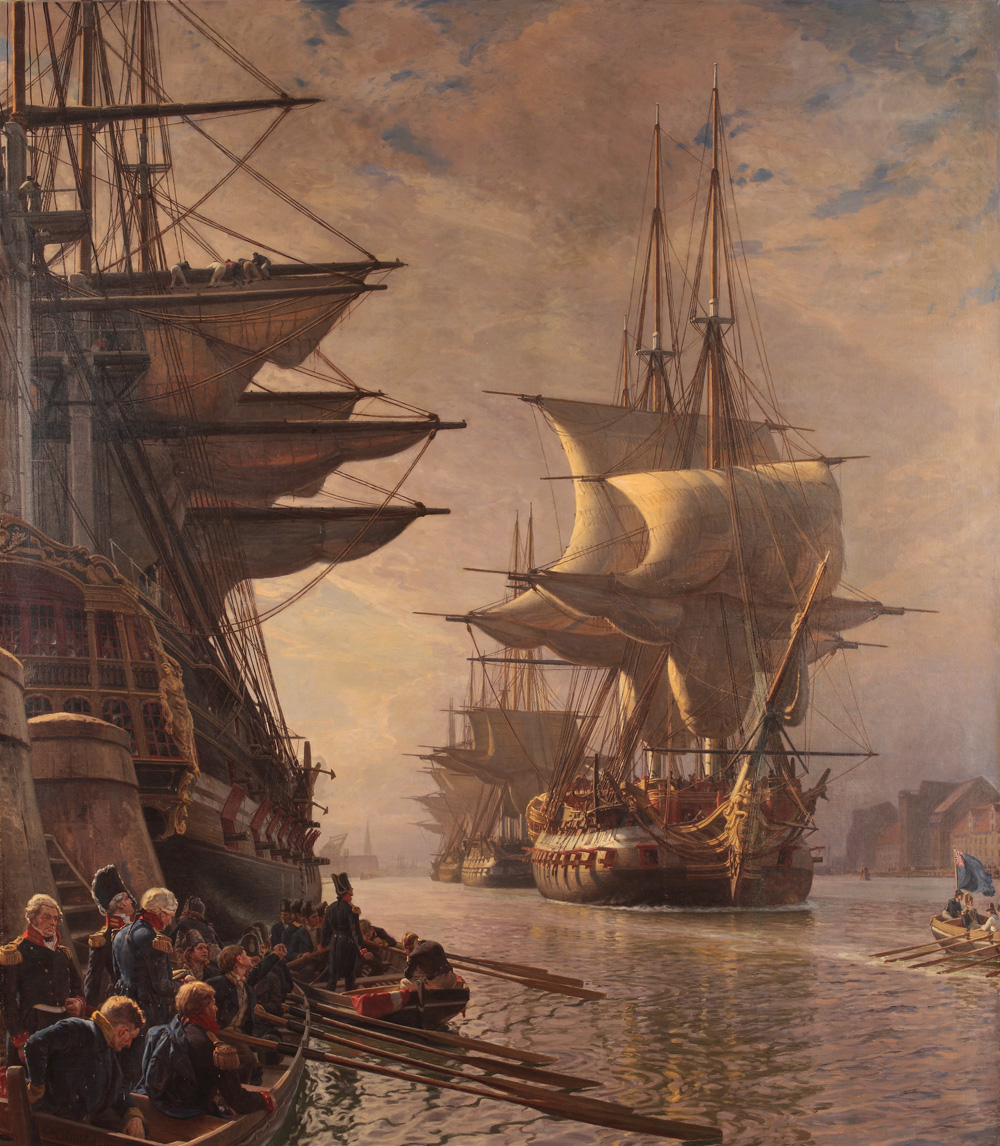
The Fleet leaves the Port the last Time, a 1919 painting by Christian Mølsted depicting the Danish ships of the line being taken from Copenhagen by the Royal Navy

Ships include: (Note: The Royal Danish Naval Museum website lists over 2400 ships with access to their design plans and models where such exist. The list of Danish ships starts with one dated 1640 and reaches 1938. Using Danish language settings, it is possible to search for/filter specific types of ship, the designers by name, and specific dates. Also from this museum is the skibregister, consisting of record cards for individual ships (where they have been saved))

- Engelen, (1504–?)
- Maria, (1504–?)
- Trost a.k.a. Hunden and Skjodehunden (c. 1600)
- Den Røde Løve a.k.a. Løven (c. 1600)
- Katten a.k.a. Grønlandiske Kat (1605–1611)
- Tre Kroner, warship (1601–1624)
- Gabriel, (c. 1616)
- Stora Sofia, warship (1624–1645)
- Norske Løve, warship (1634–1653)
- Frederik, warship (1649–1673)
- Sophia Amalia, warship (1650–1687)
- Prins Christian a.k.a. Prinsesse Charlotte Amalie and Enigheden, warship (1651–1679)
- Trefoldighed, warship (1652–1676)
- Norske Løve, warship (1654–1666)
- Prins Christian a.k.a. Christianus Quintus, (1665–1708) Orlogsskib
- Norske Løve, warship (1665–1679)
- Hummeren, warship/frigate (1666–1700)
- Norske Løve, warship (1680–1715)
- Dannebroge, ship of the line (1692–1710)
- Fredericus Quartus a.k.a. Store Christianus Quintus (1699–1732) warship
- Elephanten, ship of the line (1703-1728)
- Hjælperinden, artillery pram (1718–?)
- Norske Løve, warship (1735–1764)
- Fredericus Quintus, warship (1753–1775)
- Hvide Ørn, frigate (1753–1776)
- Søridderen, frigate (1758–1785)
- Norske Løve, warship (1765–1798)
- Cristian den Syvende, warship (1767–?)
- Den Prægtige, warship (1768–1799)
- Dristigheden, bomb vessel (1771–?)
- Holsteen, ship of the line (1775–1801)
- Disco, frigate (1778–?)
- Friderichsværn, frigate (1783–1807)
- Speideren, cutter (1783–1799)
- Søehesten, gun barge (1785–1801)
- Aggershuus, cavalry pram (1786–1805)
- Indfødsretten, ship of the line (1787–1801)
- Hielperen, frigate (1787–1806)
- Lærken, lugger (1788–1797)
- Neptunus, warship (1789–1807)
- Triton, frigate (1790–1807)
- Najaden, frigate (1796–1807)
- Waldemar, warship (1797–1807)
- Prinds Christian Frederik, warship (1804–1808)
- Najaden, frigate (1811–1812)
- Thorbjørn, icebreaker (1996-2015)
- Danbjørn, icebreaker (1996-2023)
