= Thorbjørn (icebreaker) =

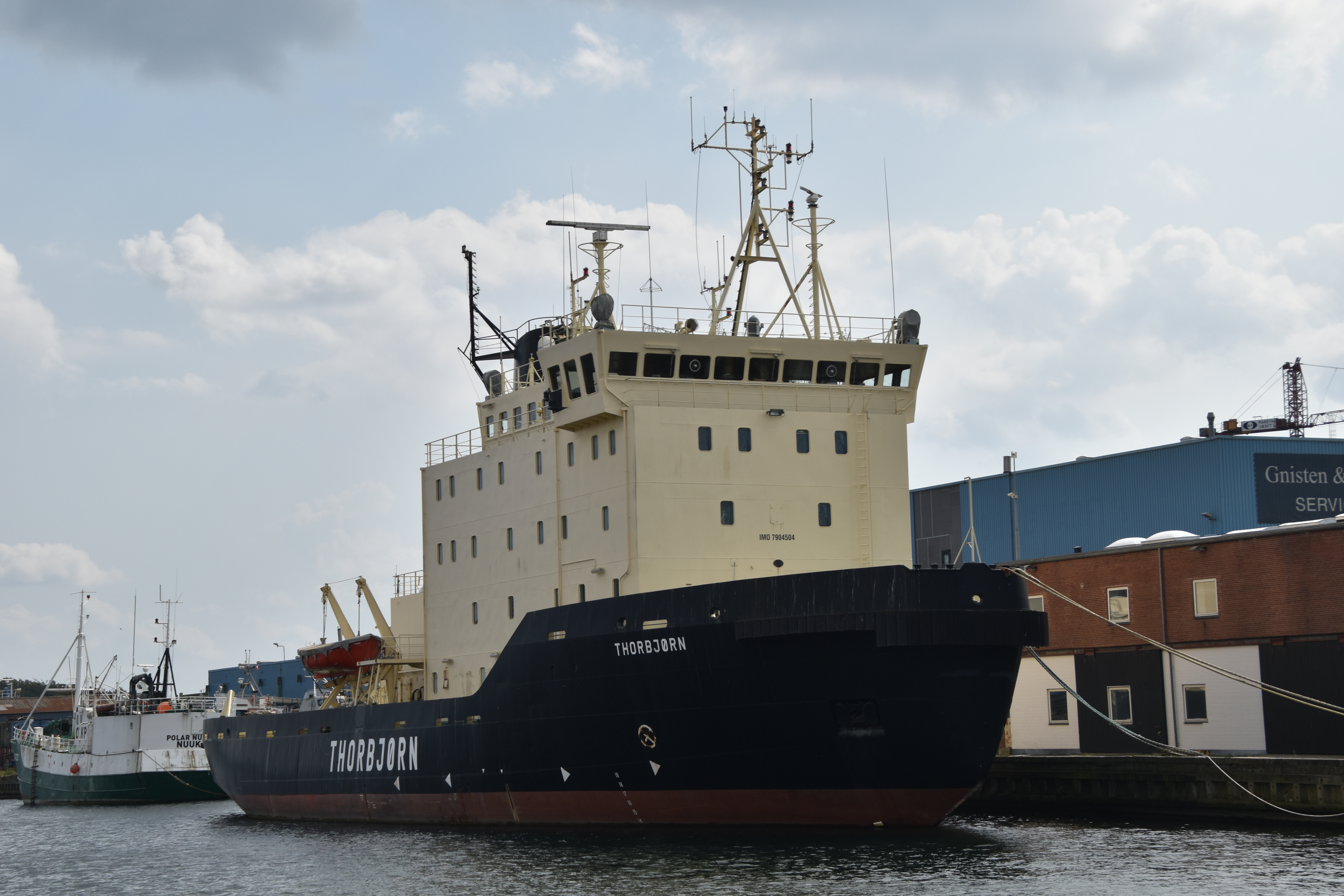
Thorbjørn seen in Svendborg in 2024

Thorbjørn, formerly HMDS Thorbjørn is a large deep sea icebreaker. The ship was originally built for the Royal Danish Navy, along with two others, to serve in the Arctic and Antarctic. The ship was designed to break and navigate in sea ice and was typically in operation with the Navy between December and March during the northern ice season. The ship is in private ownership.

The ship was a sister ship to HDMS Danbjørn and HDMS Isbjørn.

== History ==
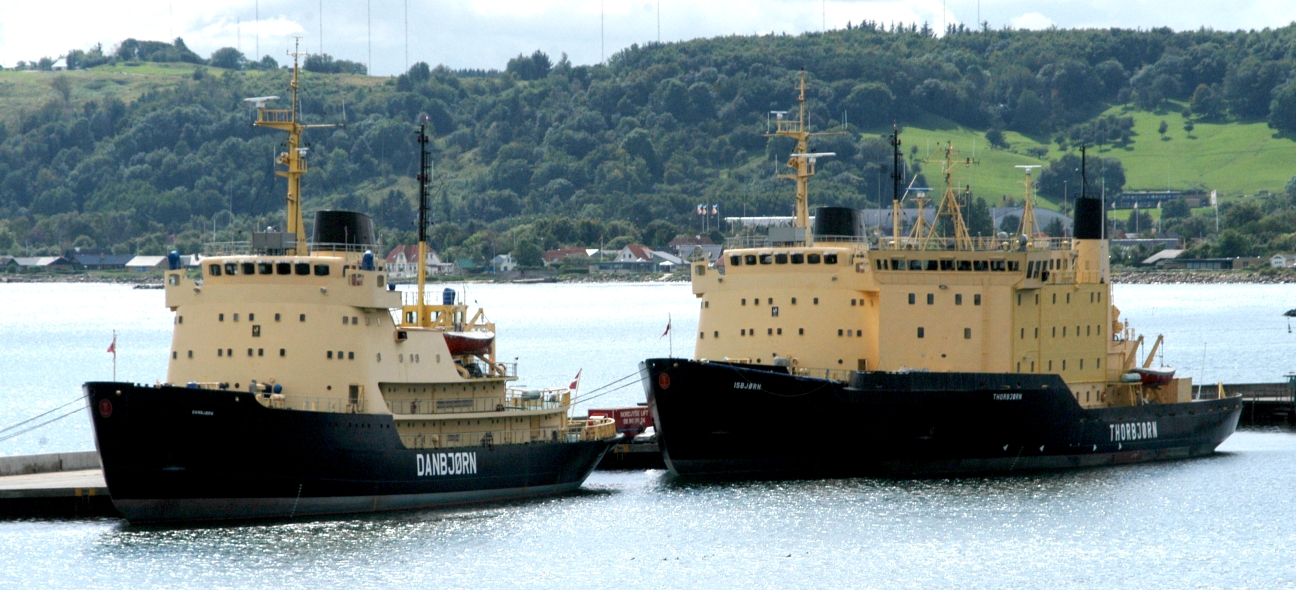
HDMS Thorbjørn with Danbjørn in Frederikshavn

Construction of the ship began 12 November 1979 and the ship was launched 1 June 1980. The ship was commissioned with the Danish Navy on 1 January 1996. She was assigned to Division 15, 1st Naval Squadron at Frederikshavn. The icebreaker frequently worked in the waters around Greenland and sometimes cooperated with the Canadian Coast Guard.

In 2014, Adelaide Nautical College in Australia attempted to buy the ship but was unsuccessful. In September 2015, it was announced that Thorbjørn had been sold to Nordane Shipping in Svendborg for a two-digit million sum and the ship left Flådestation Frederikshavn the same day.

In 2019, the ship featured on a postal stamp in Sierra Leone.

Since 2020 she has been listed for sale.

== Equipment ==
The ship is Diesel–electric. She also has a Wärtsilä air bubbling (air lubrication) system to prevent friction with ice.
