= HDMS Hielperen =

Naval ship of Denmark

History
- Name: Hielperen
- Commissioned: 1787
- Decommissioned: 1806

General characteristics
- Type: Frigate
- Complement: 269
- Armament: 20 guns

Hielperen (or Hjelperen) (literally: the Helper) was a 16-gun defence frigate in the Royal Dano-Norwegian Navy. Commissioned in 1787, she took part in the Battle of Copenhagen on 2 April 1801 against the British Royal Navy. During the battle, the ship had a crew of 269 sailors, six of whom wounded in the battle, and was commanded by Lt. Peter-Carl Lilienskjöld. The ship took a severe beating but the crew managed to cut the ship's cables and escape to the safety of Copenhagen Harbour. The ship withdrew from combat at 1 PM. Hielperen served in the Danish Navy until 1806.
