= Godske Lindenov =

Danish naval officer and Arctic explorer (died 1612)

Godske Christoffersen Lindenov or Lindenow (died 1612, Copenhagen) was a Danish naval officer and Arctic explorer. He was a commander on one of King Christian IV's expeditions to Greenland.

== Early life ==
He was of the noble family Lindenov of Lindersvold, son of Christoffer Clausen Lindenov (d. 1593) and Sophie Hartvigsdatter Plessen.

== Career ==
Godske Lindenov was part of the escort of Prince Hans, son of Frederick II of Denmark and Norway, on his fatal 1602 journey to Moscow to marry Xenia, daughter of the tsar Boris Godunov.

Lindenov joined the Danish Royal Navy in 1605 and was the same year sent on the Hans Køning Expedition to Southern Greenland led by John Cunningham to assert Danish sovereignty. Lindenov was given command of the vessel Den Røde Løve ("Red Lion"). Lindenov landed near Atammik and brought two Inuit back to Copenhagen. In the following year, Christian IV of Denmark sent him on a new expedition to Greenland with James Hall as a pilot. Five ships were sent: Trost ("Consolation", his flagship), Den Røde Løve (commanded by John Cunningham), Katten ("Cat", commanded by Anders Nolk), Ørnen ("Eagle", commanded by Hans Bruun) and the ex-Scottish Gilliflower (also called variously the Gillibrand, the Giltbert, and the Angelibrand, commanded by Carsten Richardson). The expedition landed in Southwest Greenland and searched for silver ore, which was not found.

In the following years, he was sent on naval operations, e.g. in the Baltic during the Kalmar War (1611–1613). He fell ill and died in Copenhagen in 1612. Lindenov Fjord in East Greenland is named for him.

== Personal life ==
Lindenov married Karen Gyldenstjerne, daughter of Henrik Gyldenstjerne and Birgitte Trolle on 10 March 1611. Their son Christopher Lindenov (c. 1612–1679) became an admiral of the Danish Navy as well.

== See also ==
- Cartographic expeditions to Greenland
- List of Arctic expeditions
