= J. A. D. Jensen =

Royal Danish Navy officer and explorer (1849-1936)

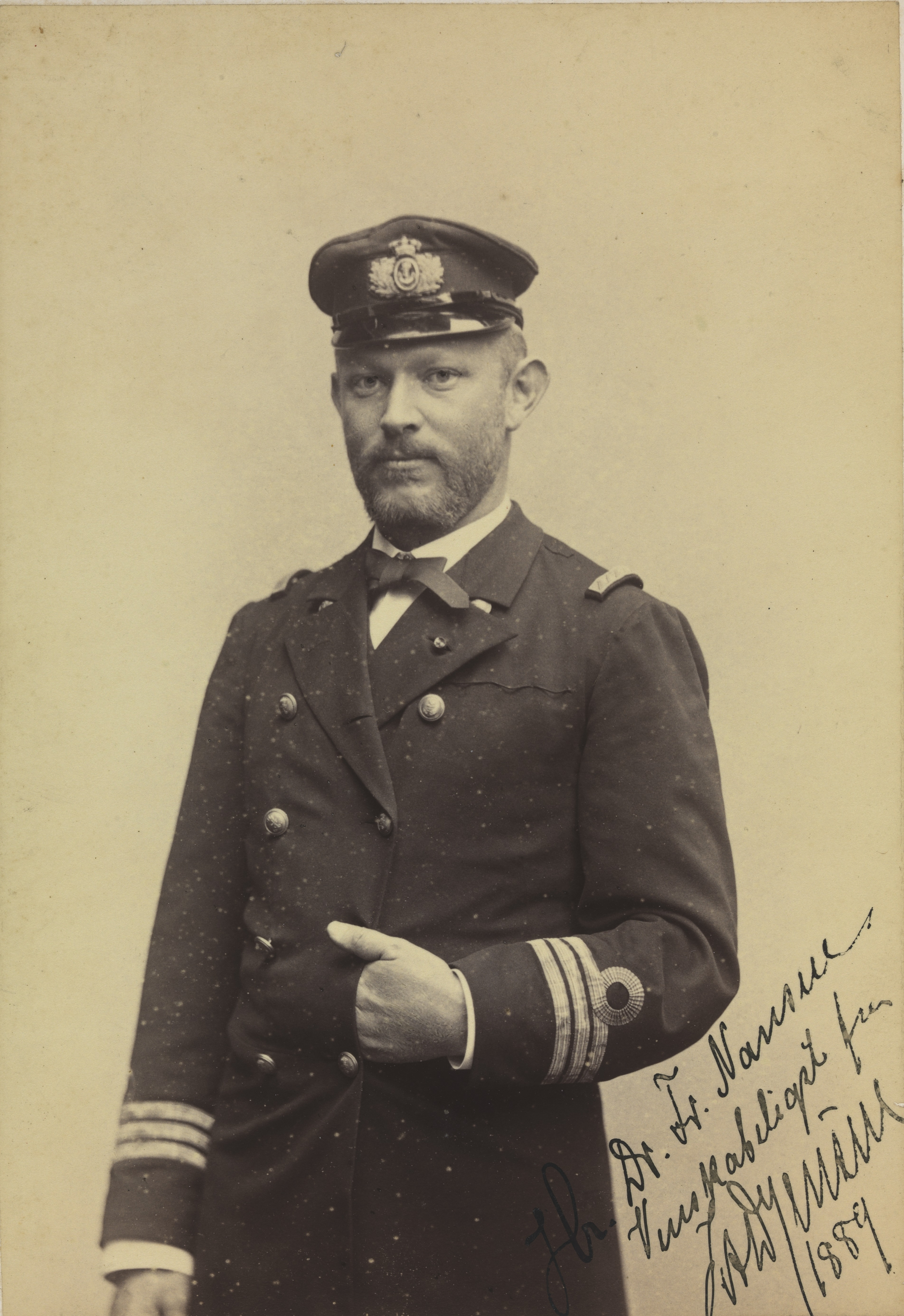
J. A. D. Jensen

Jens Arnold Diderich Jensen (24 July 1849 – 24 November 1936) was a Royal Danish Navy officer and explorer.

== Career ==
Jensen assisted the geological exploration along the Greenland west coast. He is particularly renowned for his explorations of the inland ice sheet. He led an expedition that discovered the nunataks now named J. A. D. Jensen Nunataks (J. A. D. Jensens Nunatakker) after him. The geologist of the expedition, A. Kornerup, collected no less than 27 species of Angiosperms on the nunataks. Cape J.A.D. Jensen and the J.A.D. Jensen Fjord are also named after him.

In 1911, he changed his name to Jens Arnold Diderich Jensen Bildsøe.

== Works ==
- Indlandsisen, 1888.
- Grundrids af Læren om Ebbe og Flod, 1899.
- Lærebog i Navigation, I-II, 1903–04, 2nd edition 1914–19.
- Kortfattet Navigationslære, 1908, 4th edition 1929.
- Danske Søfartslove i Uddrag (1908, 3d edition 1927)
- Nautisk Almanak, 1891.
- Contribution to Meddelelser om Grønland

== See also ==
- Cartographic expeditions to Greenland
- List of Arctic expeditions
