= Cape Nansen =

Headland in eastern Greenland

Cape Nansen Kap Nansen
- Cape
- Coordinates: 68°13′45″N 29°25′30″W
- Location: Sermersooq, Greenland
- Offshore water bodies: Greenland Sea

Area
  - Total: Arctic

Cape Nansen (Danish: Kap Nansen) is a headland in the Greenland Sea, east Greenland, Sermersooq municipality. This cape is named after Fridtjof Nansen. Cape Nansen is an important geographical landmark.

== Geography ==
Cape Nansen is located to the northeast of the mouth of the Nansen Fjord in an indented area of the eastern Greenland coast where there is a succession of headlands with active glaciers in between. The cape lies 15 km to the east-northeast of the mighty Cape J.A.D. Jensen on Sokongen Island

This headland has been defined by the International Hydrographic Organization as the Southwest limit of the Greenland Sea, which is a line joining Cape Nansen with Straumnes, Iceland, the NW point of Iceland.

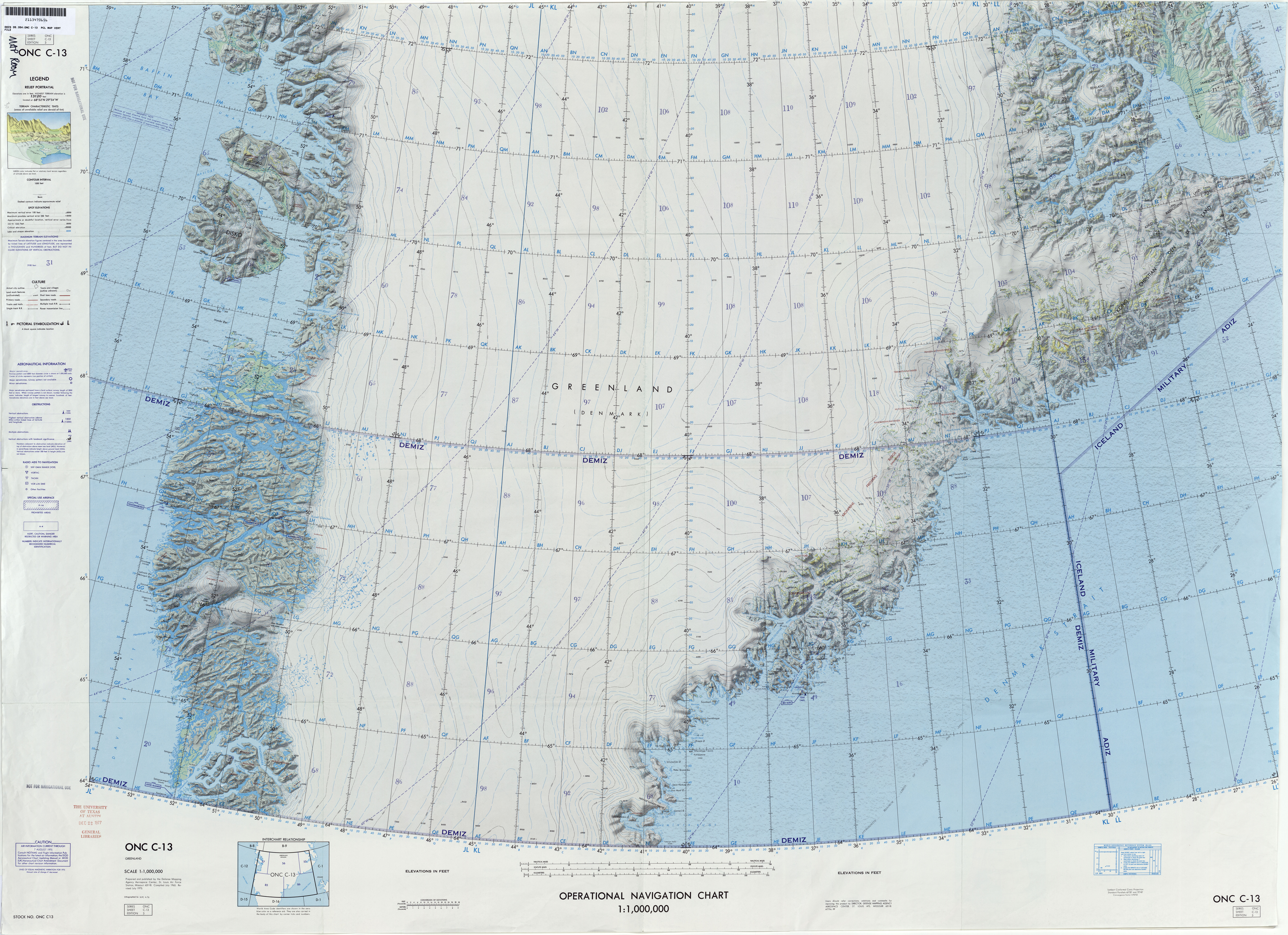
Map of Greenland section.
