= Det Harboeske Enkefruekloster =

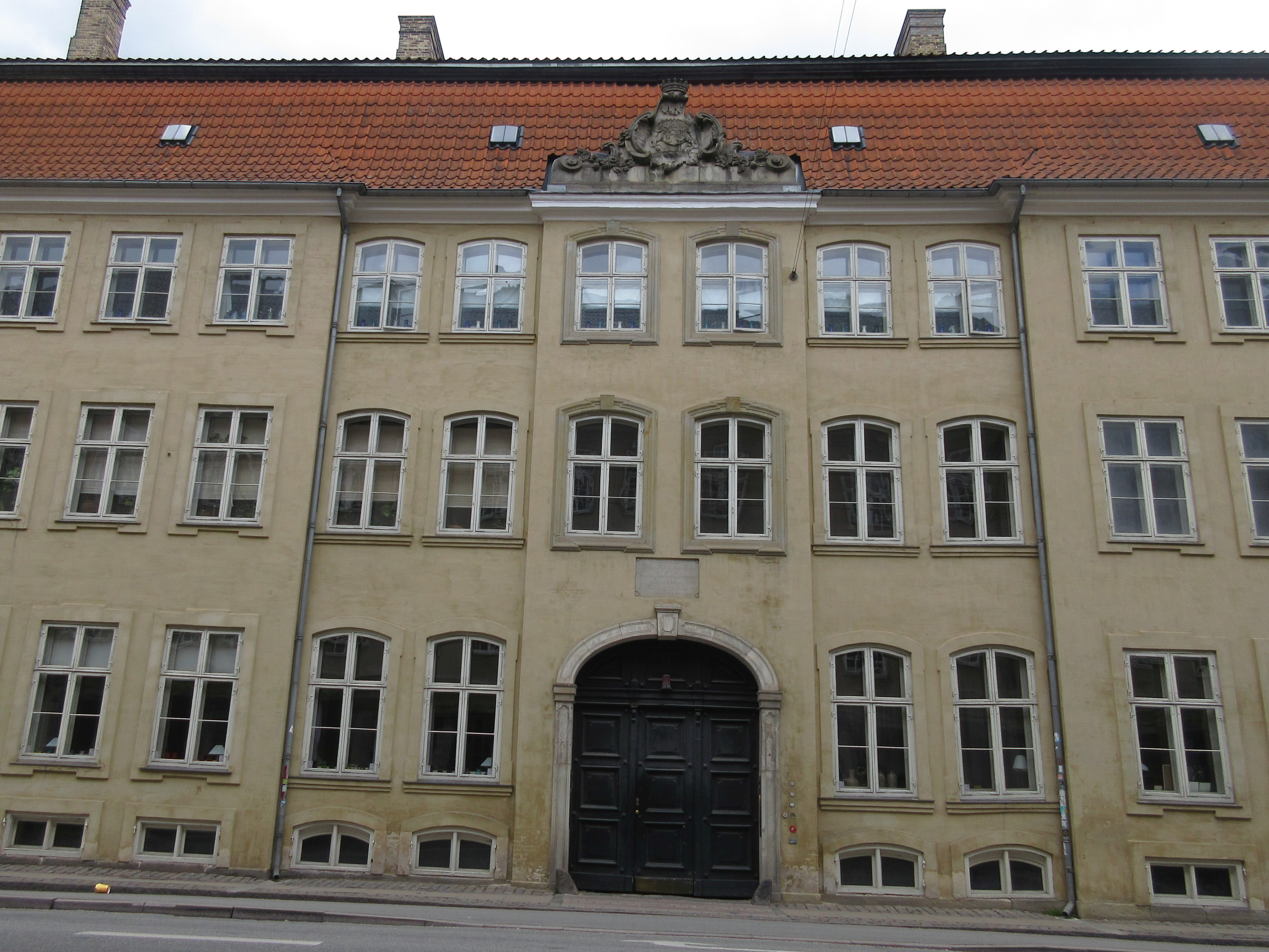
- Interactive map of the Det Harboeske Enkefruekloster area

General information
- Location: Copenhagen, Denmark
- Coordinates: 55°40′29″N 12°34′25″E
- Completed: 18th century

Det Harboeske Enkefruekloster (English: Harboe's Refuge for Widowed Ladies) is a Late Baroque building on Stormgade in Copenhagen, Denmark. The charity was founded by Christine Harboe (née Baroness Fuiren). The building was listed in the Danish registry of protected buildings and places in 1918.

== History ==
=== Early history ===
The lot was originally acquired by landdrost Simon de Pethum when Stormgade was created together with the rest of the new Frederiksholm neighbourhood. The house was possibly designed by court architect Lambert van Haven. He lived in the building with his wife and 11 children.

=== Eilersen and Harboe families ===
In 1700, Lambert van Haven's widow sold the property to Baroness Margrethe Fuiren (née Eilersen, 1648–1708), widow of lensbaron Diderik Fuiren. The new owner was the mother of Christina Fuiren. The two baronesses lived in the house until Christina's marriage to former war minister Jens Harboe. Margrethe Fuiren died in 1708 and in 1711 the wealthy couple extended the house in Stormgade with the assistance of Elias David Häusser who had also designed the 1st Christiansborg Palace. Jens Harboe died after six years of marriage, leaving one of the richest widows in Denmark. She owned the estates Støvringgaard, Gerdrup and Lyngbygaard.

=== Harboe's Refuge for Widowed Ladies ===
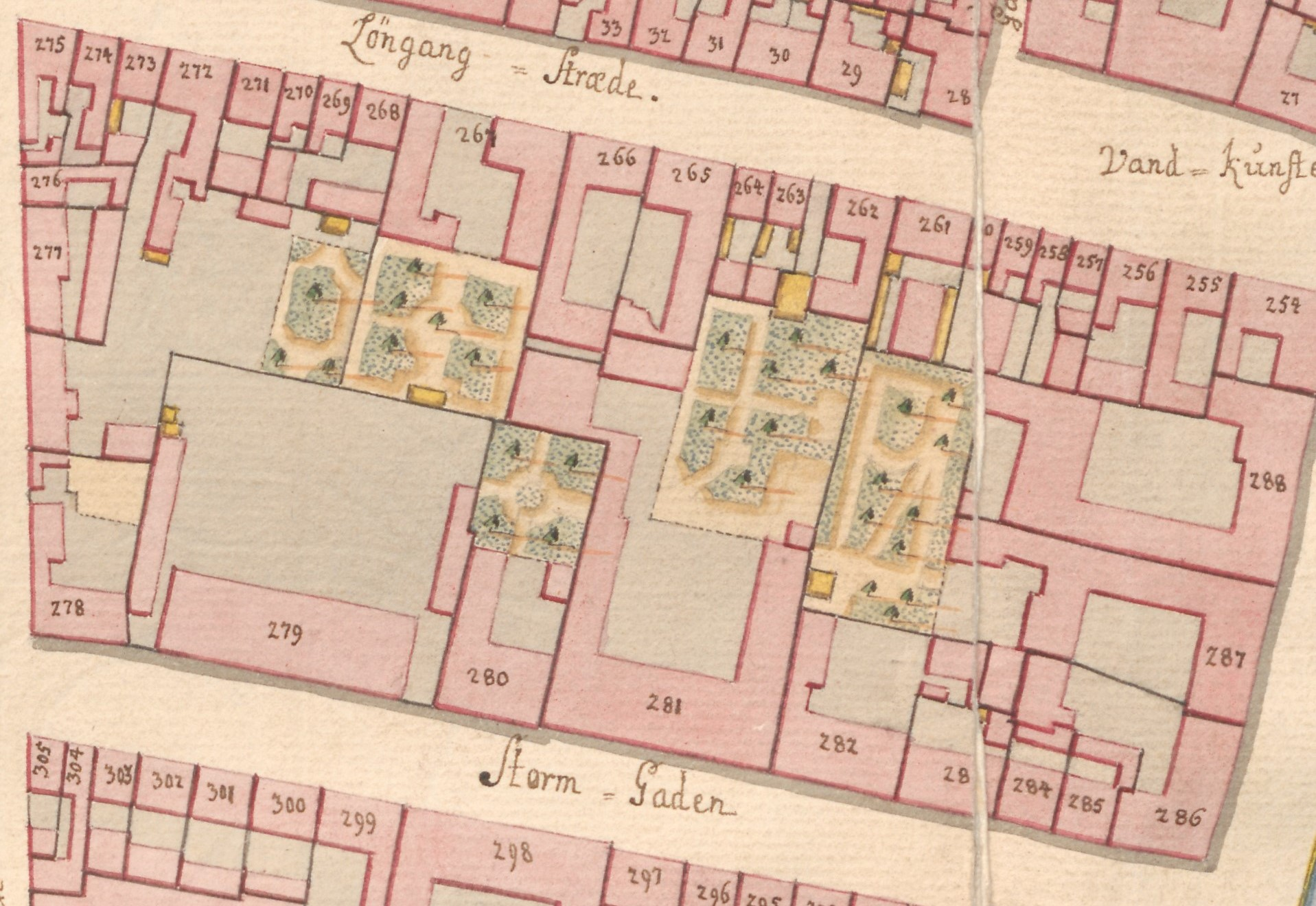
No. 280 seen on a detail from Christian Gedde's map of Copenhagen's West Quarter, 1757.

Christina Harboe died in 1735, shortly after her return from a journey to Paris and London. Before her departure, she had created a will which turned her property in Stormgade into a residence for 12 pious widows in need from the upper classes. Thurah's expansion. Illustration from Erik Pontoppidan's Danish Atlas The building was extended with two bays and an extra floor by Elias David Häusser in connection with its conversion into a foundation.

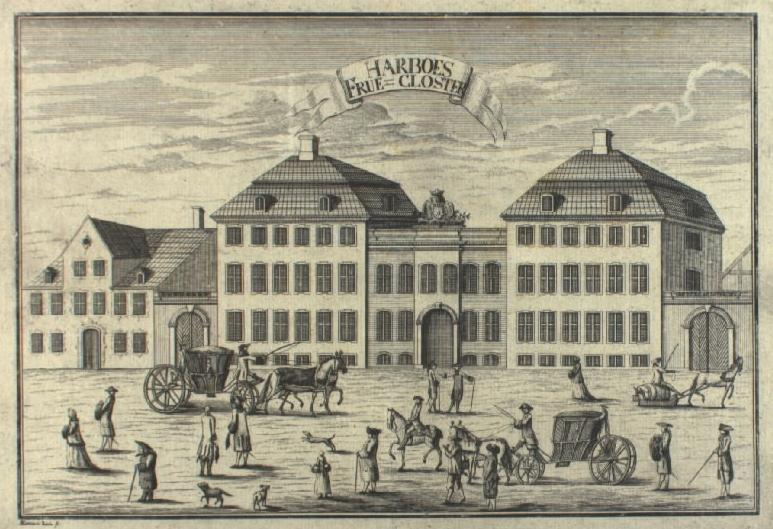
The property as it appeared after Lauritz de Thurah's alterations

In 1754–60, the building was expanded and adapted under the supervision of Lauritz de Thurah. He created a building identical to the existing one and connected the two by a low gateway wing. In 1772, Caspar Frederik Harsdorff merged them into one building, topped by a large Mansard roof. The property was listed in the new cadastre of 1756 as No. 280 in Western Quarter.

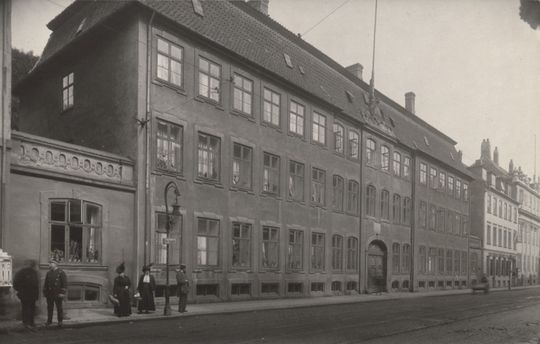
The building in the 1910s

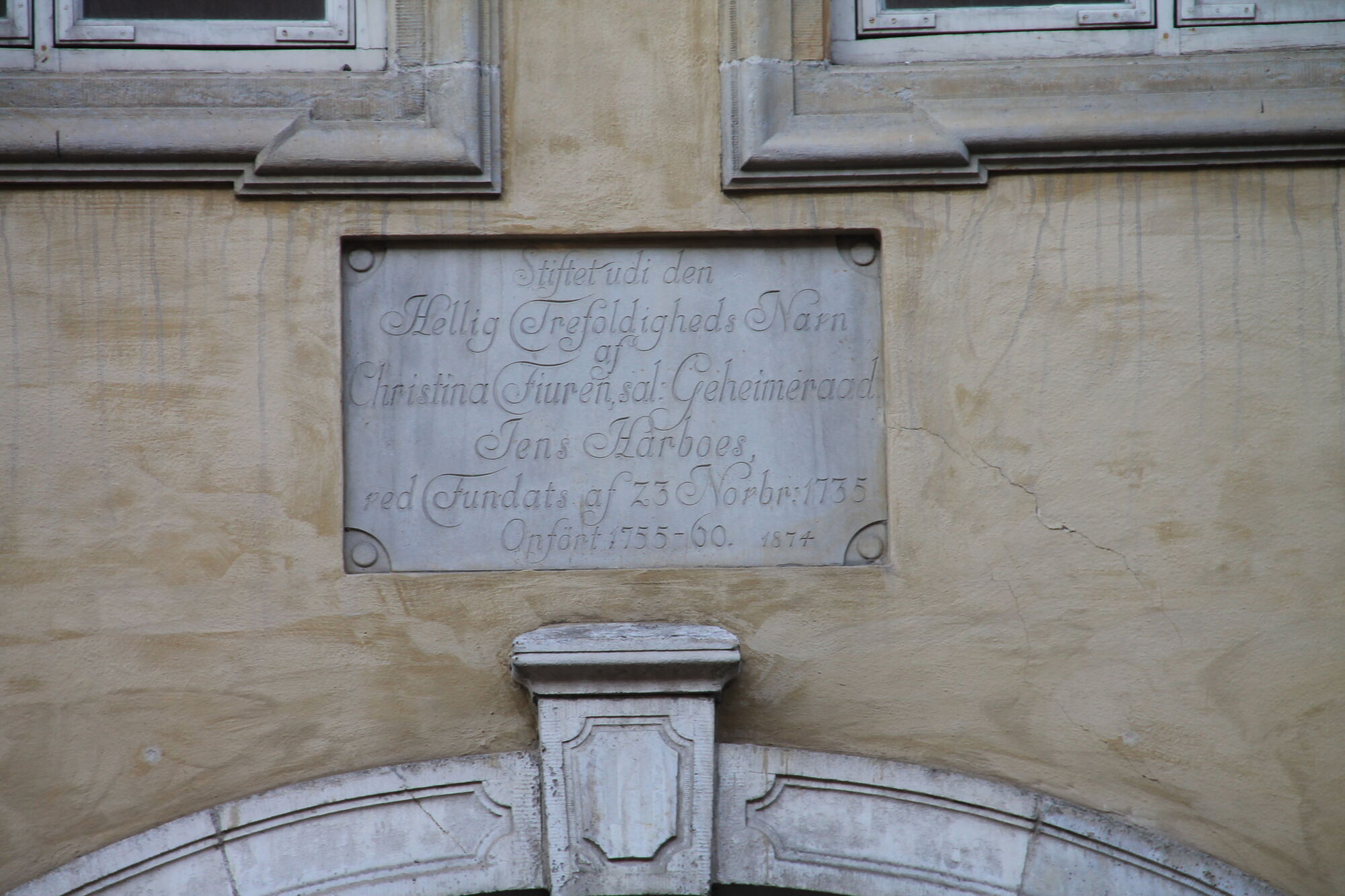
Commemorative plaque.

In 2000, Realdania Byg took over the heavily neglected building and put it through a major renovation under the direction of Jens Baumann.
