= J. A. D. Jensen Nunataks =

- J. A. D. Jensen Nunatakker
- Location within Greenland

Highest point
- Elevation: 1,667 m (5,469 ft)
- Coordinates: 62°49′N 48°55′W

Geography
- Location: Sermersooq, Greenland

Climbing
- First ascent: J.A.D. Jensen, 1878

J. A. D. Jensen Nunataks (Danish: J. A. D. Jensen Nunatakker) are a nunatak group in Greenland. Administratively it falls under the Sermersooq Municipality.

This geographic feature was named after Danish naval officer and Arctic explorer Jens Arnold Diderich Jensen.

== Geography ==
The J. A. D. Jensen Nunataks are located in Southwest Greenland to the northeast of the Dalager Nunataks, near the western limit of the Greenland Ice Sheet and about 60 km from the coast.

The nunatak area is 13 km in length and its maximum width is 8 km; the highest elevation is located at the southeastern end and is 1,667.8 metres (5,472 ft) high.

== Climate ==
Polar climate prevails in the region. The average annual temperature in the area of the J. A. D. Jensen Nunataks is -14 °C. The warmest month is July when the average temperature reaches -4 °C and the coldest is February when the temperature sinks to -20 °C.

== See also ==
- List of nunataks of Greenland
