= Katten (ship) =

Katten (lit. 'The Cat') was a 20-ton yacht of the Dano-Norwegian navy, which was later known as the Grønlandiske Kat ('Greenland Cat'). It was purchased from Scotland in 1605 and was probably only armed with a few guns. The ship was considered fast and nimble and could be used closer to shore than larger vessels.

Katten served as John Knight's ship during the 1605 Hans Køning expedition to Greenland and Anders Nolk's during the Lindenov expedition the next year. She was possibly identical with the Greenland Bark recorded as accompanying the Trost on Carsten Richardson's expedition in 1607. All these expeditions had been organized by King Christian IV in order to reestablish contact with the lost Norse settlements on Greenland and then to exploit the silver and gold ore supposedly returned by the first expedition.

It participated in Mogens Ulfeld's fleet in 1610.

== See also ==
- Christian IV's expeditions to Greenland
- Dano-Norwegian Navy
- Danish colonization of Greenland
