= Carsten Richardson =

Holsteinian-Danish naval officer and arctic explorer

Carsten Richardson was an early 17th-century Holsteinian-Danish naval officer and Arctic explorer. He was the commander of King Christian IV's final expedition to Greenland.

Carsten Richardson was in command of one of five ships in the 1606 expedition to Greenland led by Godske Lindenov and sent by Christian IV of Denmark to locate the lost Eastern Norse Settlement and to assert Danish sovereignty. In the following year, Richardson was made leader of a failed expedition with the same purpose, equipped with two ships – the flagship Trost ("Consolation") and Grønlandske Bark ("Greenland Bark") – and 44 men. Dense sea ice prevented them from landing on the Greenland coast, which was in sight.

== Notes ==
- Mills, William James (2003) Exploring Polar Frontiers: A Historical Encyclopedia – 2 vols. Santa Barbara, CA USA. pp. 548–549: Carsten Richardson

== See also ==
- Cartographic expeditions to Greenland
- List of Arctic expeditions
