= John Cunningham (explorer) =

Scottish polar explorer

John Cunningham (Danish: Hans Kønig; c. 1575 – 9 December 1651) was a Scottish nobleman, explorer, Dano-Norwegian naval captain, and Governor of Finnmark.

== Biography ==
In 1605, Cunningham became captain of the 60-ton Danish naval ship Trost. Along with the 70-ton Den Røde Løve and the 20-ton Katten, the ships were directed by the Danish King, Christian IV, to re-establish contact with the Norse settlements in Greenland, the first of three annual expeditions sent between 1605 and 1607. Cunningham served as the chief commander, following the piloting of James Hall and commanding Godske Lindenov in the Løven and John Knight in the Katten.

During the Lindenov expedition of 1606, Cunningham served as the captain of the Løven under Lindenov's command. In 1615, Cunningham was among the commanders aboard the naval expedition under Gabriel Kruse sent to Spitsbergen to demand tolls from foreign whalers. There, Cunningham encountered Robert Fotherby, Thomas Edge, and Adriaen Block. The following year, he captained the Gabriel as part of the naval expedition under Jørgen Daa sent to rid the coasts of Norway, the Faeroes, and Iceland of illegal whalers and pirates.

In 1619, Cunningham was made Governor of Finnmark in the far north, a post he retained until his death in 1651. There, he presided over 52 witch trials, nine of which afflicted the Sami population.
