= James Hall (explorer) =

English explorer

James Hall (d. 1612) was an English explorer. In Denmark, he was known as Jacob Hald. Born in Hull, he piloted three of King Christian IV's Expeditions to Greenland under John Cunningham (1605), Godske Lindenov (1606), and Carsten Richardson (1607). In his first voyage he charted the west coast of Greenland as far north as 68° 35' N. The discovery of silver resulted in larger expeditions being sent the following two years, both of which were expensive failures.

In 1612 Hall again went to Greenland, this time in search of the Northwest Passage. He had two English ships under his command, the 140-ton Patience and the 60-ton Heart's-Ease. William Baffin served as his chief pilot. On 12 or 22 July, he encountered Inuit in Amerdloq Fjord. Angry over the seizure of several Inuit by Cunningham in 1605, one of them struck Hall with a spear; he died the following day.
