= Nicholas Downton =

Nicholas Downton (1561–6 August 1615), was a commander in the service of the English East India Company (EIC).

== Life and career ==
=== Early years ===
Downton was born in the village of Bushley in Worcestershire in early 1561, the son of John and Katherine Downton. On the orders of the Earl of Cumberland he took part in the action of Faial in 1594 as commander of the Samson, which resulted in the destruction of the Portuguese carrack Las Cinco Chagas. Although severely wounded during the action, by 1605 he had recovered and made a trading voyage in the Pilgrim to Cumaná and other Caribbean ports. Records held at the India Office indicate that Downton and the Earl of Cumberland were the principal shareholders in the venture, and since tobacco was the return cargo, it may be inferred that the Pilgrim returned home via Virginia.

=== Far east ===
Early in 1610 he was appointed to command the EIC's ship Peppercorn, and sailed under Sir Henry Middleton in the Trades Increase on the Company's sixth voyage to the Far East accompanied by the Darling. After touching at the Cape Verde Islands and in Saldanha Bay (now Table Bay), they arrived at Aden on 7 November. They were received with apparent friendliness, and after inquiring into the prospects of trade, Middleton, leaving the Peppercorn at Aden, went on to Mocha, where he anchored on 15 November. After friendly intercourse for some days, on the 28th he was treacherously attacked, taken prisoner, and heavily ironed. The Turks then attempted to seize the ships, but were beaten off with great loss. Nearly at the same time a number of the Peppercorn's men were seized at Aden; and Downton, coming round to Mocha to confer with his general, found himself for the time being in command of the expedition. He remained in the Red Sea, carrying on an occasional correspondence with Middleton, who, on 11 May 1611, succeeded in escaping to the ships. For the next eighteen months they continued, for the most part in the Red Sea or Arabian Sea, visiting the several ports, and seeking to establish a trade; as to which Downton relates that having bought a quantity of pepper at Tecoa on the west coast of Sumatra, on examining it they "found much deceit; in some bags were small bags of paddy, in some rice, and in some great stones; also rotten and wet pepper put into new dry sacks." Towards the end of 1612 Middleton went on to Bantam in the Peppercorn, leaving Downton to follow in the Trades Increase. In doing so the ship struck on an unseen rock, and when got off was found to be leaking badly. Downton returned to Tecoa and had her refitted as well as possible; but on joining Middleton it was decided that the ship could not go home till she had been careened. It was accordingly determined that Downton should take the Peppercorn to England, and he sailed on the homeward voyage on 4 February 1612 (OS) 1613 (N.S.). The voyage was one of difficulty and distress. Within three days after leaving Java Head half the ship's company were down with sickness. "He that escapes without disease," Downton wrote, "from that stinking stew of the Chinese part of Bantam must be of strong constitution of body." The passage was tedious. Many of his men died, most were smitten with scurvy, he himself was dangerously ill; and the ship, in a very helpless state, unable by foul winds to reach Milford Haven, anchored at Waterford on 13 September 1613, and a month later arrived in the Downs.

On 1 January 1614 (N.S.) a new ship of 550 tons was launched for the company, and named the New Year's Gift. Downton was appointed to command her, and to be general of the company's ships in the East Indies. The other ships that would accompany him on his next voyage were the Hector, commanded by Arthur Spaight, the Hope (Matthew Molineux) and the Solomon (Hugh Bennet). Each subsidiary vessel also carried one of the Company's principal factors; William Edwards on the Hector, Nicholas Ensworth (or Emsworth) on the Hope and Thomas Elkington on the Solomon. On 7 March the fleet of four ships put to sea; on 15 June they anchored in Saldanha Bay. Stopping at Socotra, Downton presented the local king with gifts including two fowling pieces, two broadcloth vests, a mirror and 40lb of gunpowder. The fleet arrived at Surat on 15 October where the Portuguese, long determined to resist the advance of the English, were also now at odds with the nawab of Surat. To crush their enemies at one blow the Portuguese collected their whole available force at Goa. It amounted to six large galleons, besides several smaller vessels, and sixty so-called frigates, in reality row-boats, carrying in all 134 guns, and manned by 2,600 Europeans and six thousand natives. In addition to the four ships just arrived with Downton, two of which were small compared with the Portuguese galleons, the English had only three or four country vessels known as galivats, and their men numbered at the outside under six hundred. It was the middle of January 1614–15 before the Portuguese, having mustered their forces, arrived before Surat. The nawab was terrified and sued for peace. The Viceroy of Goa, Jeronimo de Azevedo, who commanded in person, haughtily refused the submission, and on 20 January the fight began. The English were lying in the Swally, now known as Sutherland Channel, inside a sheltering shoal, which kept the enemy's larger ships at a distance. The Portuguese did not venture to force the northern entrance to the channel, which they must have approached singly, and the attack was thus limited to the smaller vessels and the frigates, which crossed the shoal and swarmed round the Hope, the smallest of Downton's four ships, stationed for her better security at the southern end of the line. Several of them grappled with the Hope and boarded her. After a severe fight their men were beaten back, and, unable to withstand the storm of shot now rained on them, they set fire to their ships and jumped overboard. Numbers had been killed; numbers were drowned; many were burned. The Hope was for a time in great danger; the fire caught her mainsail and spread to her mainmast, which was destroyed; but she succeeded in extinguishing it and in casting off the blazing vessels, when they drifted on to the sands, and burnt harmlessly to the water's edge. During the next three weeks the viceroy made repeated attempts to burn the English ships in the roadstead, sending fireships night after night across the shoal. The English, however, always succeeded in fending them off, and on 13 February the Portuguese withdrew. They had fought with the utmost gallantry, but the position held by the English was too strong for them to force. Their loss in killed, burnt, and drowned was said to amount to nearly five hundred men; that of the English was returned as four slain. This engagement brought Portuguese power on India's western seaboard virtually to an end.

The victory enormously increased English influence, and on 25 February the nawab came down to the shore in state, was visited by Downton attended by a guard of honour of 140 men under arms, and accompanied him to the ship. There he presented him with his own sword, "the hilt," says Downton, "of massie gold, and in lieu thereof I returned him my sute, being sword, dagger, girdle, and hangers, by me much esteemed of, and which made a great deal better show, though of less value." Downton's position at Surat was, however, still one of anxiety and difficulty. A succession commission had been given to Edwardes, the second in command, who appears to have been intriguing to procure Downton's dismissal, and who, at any rate, wrote many complaints. Within little more than a month of his arrival Downton had written home (20 November 1614), complaining of others being joined in authority with him. On 3 March, Downton with his four ships left Surat, intending to go to Bantam. They were scarcely outside before they saw the Portuguese fleet coming in from the westward, and for the next three days the two fleets were in presence of each other, Downton being all the time in doubt whether the viceroy was going to attack him, or to slip past him and make an attack on Surat, which he would have equally felt bound to defend. The viceroy, however, did not think it prudent to persevere in face of Downton's bold attitude, and "on the 6th he bore up with the shore, and"—to quote Downton's journal—"gave over the hope of their fortunes by further following of us." The Portuguese having now gone clear away, the English were free to pursue their route. On 19 March they doubled Cape Comorin, and on 2 June the New Year's Gift and Solomon anchored in Bantam Roads. The return to the 'stinking stew' proved fatal to Downton, and he died on 6 August. Elkington, the captain of the Solomon, noted in his journal under date 5 August: "I was aboard with the general, then very ill, and the next day had word of his departure."

== Personal life ==
Of Downton's family nothing seems to be known, except that he had one only son, George, who accompanied him in both voyages, and died at Surat on 3 February 1614–15, while they were hourly expecting the renewal of the Portuguese attack, and when, as the general touchingly noted in his journal, "I had least leisure to mourn." Early the next morning he was buried ashore, and the volley appointed to try the temper of the Portuguese viceroy served also to honour his burial.
