= Christian IV's expeditions to Greenland =

Research expeditions, 1605 to 1607

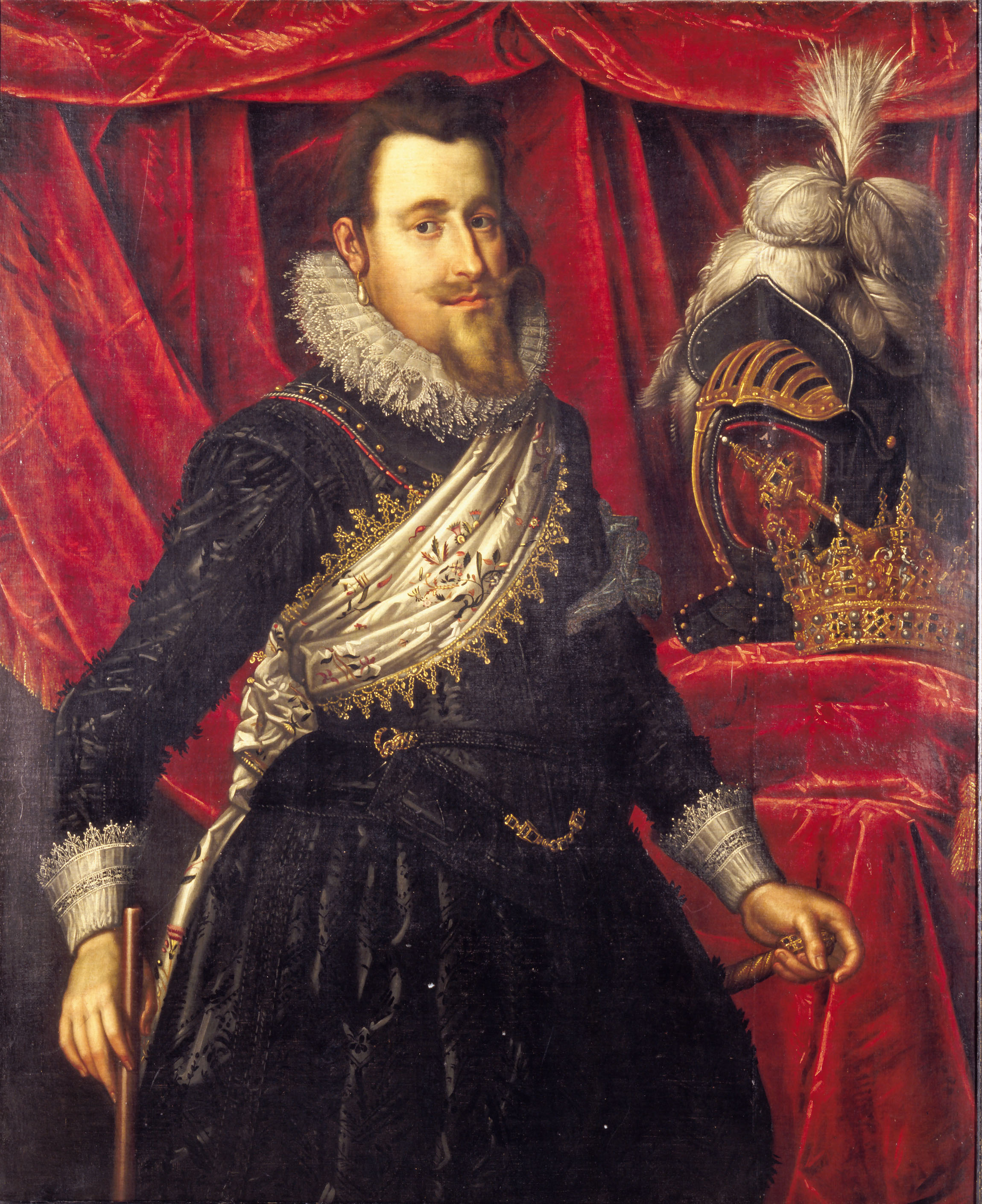
Portrait of Christian IV, King of Denmark and Norway

Christian IV's expeditions were sent by King Christian IV of Denmark-Norway to Greenland and Arctic waterways during the years 1605–1607. The expeditions were commissioned in order to locate the lost Eastern Norse Settlement and reassert sovereignty over Greenland.

== History ==
The expeditions were mostly unsuccessful, partly due to its leaders lacking experience with the difficult arctic ice and weather conditions and partly due to its leaders eventually being given instructions to search for the Eastern Settlement on the east coast of Greenland, which was almost inaccessible at the time due to southward-drifting ice.

The pilot on all three trips was James Hall, who – like many others until 1861 – trusted "Frobisher's Strait" to be in southern Greenland, whereas it is in fact a bay projecting into southern Baffin Island. The expeditions were respectively commanded by John Cunningham (or "Hans Køning"; 1605), Godske Lindenov (1606), and Carsten Richardson (1607). The Danes had a falling-out with the English over the route being taken, far to the south of that recorded in the Bergen and Trondheim archives. They also sometimes searched for the imaginary Island of Buss.

In the same vein, King Christian commissioned an expedition to North America in 1619. The expedition was captained by Dano-Norwegian navigator and explorer, Jens Munk. The ships were searching for the Northwest Passage. The expedition arrived in Hudson Bay landing at the mouth of Churchill River, settling at what is now Churchill, Manitoba. However, it was a disastrous voyage, with cold, famine, and scurvy killing most of the crew.

== Ships ==
- Trost (German: "Consolation", also called the Trust, Hunden ("The Dog"), and Skjødehunden ("The Lapdog"); 60 tons)
- Den Røde Løve ("The Red Lion", other spellings Røde Løffue, Løven, or Løffuen ("The Lion"); 70 tons)
- Katten ("The Cat", also called the Grønlandske Kat; ex-Scottish; 20 tons)
- Ørnen ("The Eagle", also rendered in English as Örnen)
- Gilliflower (ex-Scottish, also called the Gilliflowre, Gilleflowre, Gillibrandt, and Angeli Brandt)

== See also ==
- Cartographic expeditions to Greenland
- Danish colonization of Greenland
- List of Arctic expeditions

== Related reading ==
- Mills, William J. (2003) Exploring Polar Frontiers: A Historical Encyclopedia (Santa Barbara, CA: ABC-Clio) ISBN 978-1-57607-422-0
