= HDMS Danbjørn =

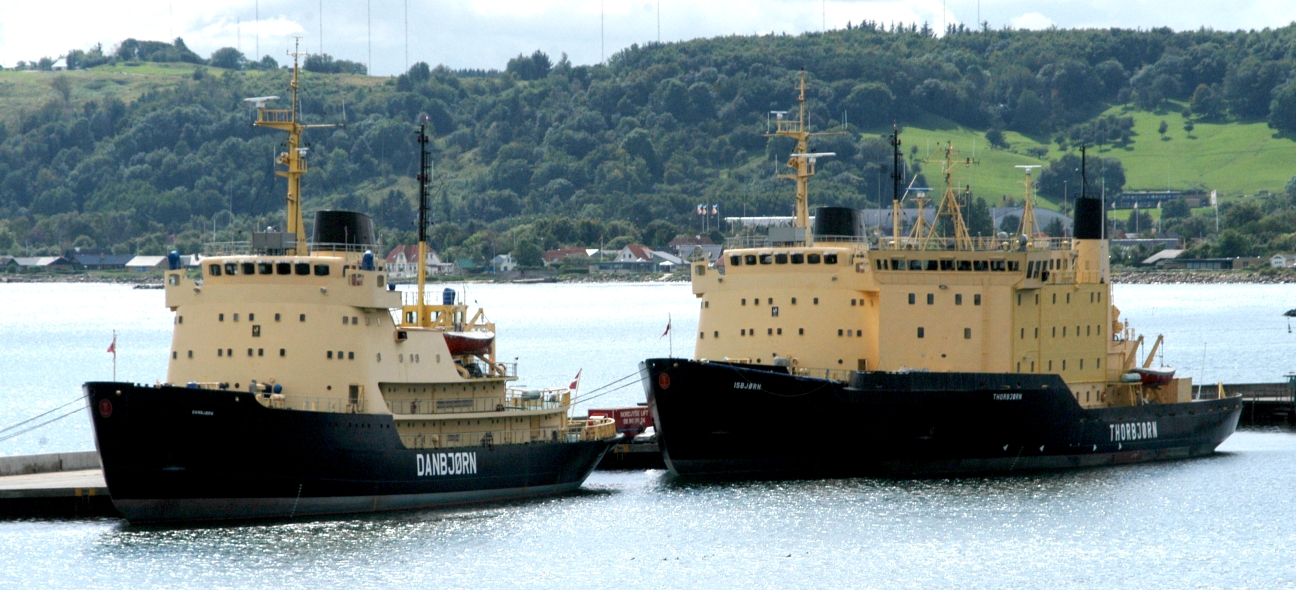
- HDMS Danbjørn with Thorbjørn in Frederikshavn

History

Denmark
- Name: Danbjørn
- Owner: Royal Danish Navy
- Operator: Royal Danish Navy
- Builder: Odense Stålskibsværft A/S, Frederikshavn
- Yard number: 171
- Launched: 1965
- In service: With Royal Danish Navy since January 1, 1996
- Identification: IMO number: 6421919; MMSI number: 219306000; Callsign: OUDN; pennant number: A551
- Fate: Sold for scrap in 2023
- Notes: International call sign OUDN

General characteristics
- Type: Icebreaker
- Displacement: 3,685 tons
- Length: 76.8 m
- Beam: 17.10 m
- Draught: 8.00 m
- Depth: 6.1 m
- Installed power: 11,880 HPS
- Propulsion: 8.679 KW
- Speed: 18 knots
- Crew: 25 (accommodation for 34)

HDMS Danbjørn (sometimes referred to as Danbjoern) was a Danish icebreaker built for breaking and reporting ice in the sea for Danish Ice Service in 1965. Originally operated by the Ministry of Industrial Affairs, it was incorporated into the Royal Danish Navy on January 1, 1996. Danbjørn was crewed by naval personnel throughout its history.

The ship's mission was to assist shipping to and from Danish ports among these the most important supply and export ports, during ice conditions in the Danish waters within the Skaw. The shipping was assisted as close as possible to their port of destination where the remaining icebreaking is taken over by the port’s own icebreaking resources. Assistance is given according to the following priority:

- Ships in distress.
- Ships transporting live animals.
- Ships transporting passengers.
- Ships transporting cargoes of special importance.
- All ships in need.

The action from Danbjørn was seen each winter from December 15 to March 31, along with Isbjørn.

The icebreaker was sold for scrap in 2023 after a long lay-up. The icebreaker was previously used in Danish waters in the winter of 1995–1996 and in Swedish waters in 2006.

== Sources ==
- Specification as on Navy Site
- Ships Specification
- Navy Ice Service
- Ice Breaking Assistance
- Ice Breaking Service
