= Trades Increase =

History

England
- Name: Trades Increase
- Operator: East India Company
- Builder: Deptford Dockyard
- Launched: 30 December 1609
- Fate: Burned, 1614

General characteristics
- Tonnage: 1,293

The Trades Increase was an English merchant ship of the East India Company that was launched in 1609. It was one of the first ships purpose built by the East India Company. The Trades Increase was to be the company's flagship for its sixth voyage to the East Indies, but was lost four years later on Java.

== History ==
The Trades Increase was constructed at the Deptford Dockyard on the Thames in London. It was launched on 30 December 1609 with King James I in attendance, who named the ship. The launch ended in fiasco when the Trades Increase became lodged in drydock, and wasn't successfully floated out until days later.

In 1610, Sir Henry Middleton was appointed to command the sixth voyage set forth by the East India Company, and sailed from the Downs on 4 April on the Trades Increase, accompanied by the Peppercorn, commanded by Nicholas Downton, and the Darling. On 7 November, they arrived at Aden. Leaving the Peppercorn there, Middleton, with the Darling, went on to Mocha; but in entering the roadstead, in charge of a native pilot, the Trades Increase was run ashore, and much of her cargo and stores had to be landed before she could be floated off.

Towards the end of 1612 Middleton went on to Bantam in the Peppercorn, leaving Downton to follow in the Trades Increase. In doing so the ship struck on an unseen rock, and when got off was found to be leaking badly. Middleton proposed to send Downton home in the Trades Increase with a cargo of pepper, while he himself, in the Peppercorn, should attempt another voyage to the Moluccas. It was found, however, that the Trades Increase was in need of a very extensive refit; so in the beginning of February 1612–13, Downton sailed for England in the Peppercorn. After a few months the Trades Increase, while being careened, fell over on her side, became a total wreck, and was set on fire by the Javanese.

== See also ==
- List of ship launches in the 1600s

== Sources ==
- Barbour, Richmond (2021). The Loss of the "Trades Increase": An Early Modern Maritime Catastrophe. Philadelphia: University of Pennsylvania Press. ISBN 978-0-8122-9774-4.
- Digges, Dudley (1615). The Defence of Trade. London: William Stansby for John Barnes.
- Laughton, John Knox (1885–1900). "Downton, Nicholas" . Dictionary of National Biography. London: Smith, Elder & Co. pp. 404–405.
- Laughton, John Knox (1885–1900). "Middleton, Henry (d.1613)" . Dictionary of National Biography. London: Smith, Elder & Co. pp. 350–352.
