= HDMS Trost =

Two ships named Trost served with the Dano-Norwegian navy between 1602 and 1653.

- Trost or Hunden Trost (1602) was a little ship with a crew of 48 men and 16 cannon. She was decommissioned in 1621.
- Trost (1625) was a pinnace with a crew of 68 and 20 (or 16?) cannon which served from 1625 to 1653.

The name is German rather than Danish; the vessel is sometimes referenced in translation as the Comfort or the Consolation. The name, however, probably refers to one of the Queen Anne Catherine of Brandenburg's lapdogs and the vessel is also referenced as Hunden ("Dog") and Skjodehunden ("Lapdog").

== Trost (1602) ==
Trost (1602)
History
- Launched: 1602
- Decommissioned: 1621

General characteristics
- Complement: 48
- Armament: 16 guns

Trost served as John Cunningham's flagship during the 1605 Hans Køning expedition to Greenland; Godske Lindenov's flagship during his expedition the next year; and Carsten Richardson's flagship during his failed expedition the year after that. King Christian IV's expeditions to Greenland had been organized to reestablish contact with the lost Norse settlements on Greenland and then to exploit the silver and gold ore supposedly returned by the first expedition.

== Trost (1625) ==
Trost (1625)
History
- Builder: David Balfour
- Launched: 1625
- Out of service: 1653

General characteristics
- Tonnage: 60-tons
- Complement: 68
- Armament: 16–20 guns

Trost served from 1625 to 1653. The ship was considered a fast one and was constructed by David Balfour (b. 1574), a Scotsman employed by the Dano-Norwegian navy from 1597 to 1634.

== See also ==
- Danish colonization of Greenland
