= David Middleton (mariner) =

David Middleton (died 1615) was a merchant and sea-captain in the service of the English East India Company who made several voyages by sea to the Far East.

== Life and career ==
He was the younger brother of John and Sir Henry Middleton and in 1601 jointly commanded a voyage to the West Indies. In 1604 he went to the East Indies with his brother Henry, as second captain of the Red Dragon, and is mentioned as having conducted the negotiations with the native kings of Ternate and Tidore. He returned with Henry in May 1606, and on 12 March 1606–7 sailed from Tilbury as captain of the Consent, one of the ships of the third voyage under William Keeling. He had with him as master John Davis of Limehouse. The Consent lost sight of her consorts in the Channel, and, as no rendezvous had been given, went on by herself to the Cape of Good Hope. She anchored in Table Bay on 16 July, with her men in good health. Middleton reluctantly proceeded without Keeling, and after touching in St. Augustine's Bay, arrived on 14 November at Bantam, whence after refitting he sailed for the Moluccas or Spice Islands. He found the Spaniards personally friendly, but having a monopoly of the commerce; and it was not till March 1607–8 that he could obtain any open permission to trade. He managed, however, to do business privately, and when the permission was withdrawn, within a few days of its being granted, he went to Bangay, and afterwards to Button, where he was well received by the king, and obtained a full cargo of cloves. By 22 May he was back at Bantam, and sailed for England on 15 July.

The voyage, though irregular, had been both speedy and profitable. Middleton was recognised as a capable and fortunate commander, and was sent out again on the fifth voyage in a larger ship, the Expedition, in which he sailed from the Downs on 24 April 1609, Davis being again his pilot master. Again he reached the Cape of Good Hope with his men in good health, and after a stay of only eight days went on to Bantam, where he arrived on 7 December. A month later he came to Button, where he entertained the king at a banquet on board; but no trade was to be done, owing to the recent destruction of the storehouses by fire, and he passed on to Bangay. The drunken and dissolute Dutchman domineered over the natives, collected the duties for the king of Ternate, and, keeping for himself as much as he wanted, sent on to the king what he could spare. Middleton, being unable to trade at Bangay, endeavoured to go to the Moluccas. Foul winds compelled him to bear up for Banda, but there the Dutch governor told him plainly that to permit him to buy a nut there was more than his head was worth. He believed that they intended to seize or burn the ship, till he showed them that he was prepared to fight if attacked. At Ceram, after some negotiation, he obtained a full cargo of nutmegs and mace. On his way back to the westward he foiled an attempt of the Dutch to intercept him, and having refitted at Bantam sailed thence on 16 November. He arrived in England in the early summer of 1611.

In May 1614 he sailed once more for the East Indies in the Samaritan, with the Thomas and Thomasine under his orders, and arrived at Bantam on 14 February 1614–15. A full cargo was collected, and after sending the smaller vessels to other ports, Middleton, in the Samaritan, sailed for England on 3 April 1615. But the ship was wrecked on the coast of Madagascar, and though it was at first reported that "passengers and goods were saved", the loss seems to have been total. The first report of Middleton's death reached the Company on 5 September 1617. No exact news was ever received, but he was registered as dead, and his will proved on 18 April 1618. On 6 October 1624 the court of directors had under consideration a letter in favour of Middleton's son. "After much reasoning the court called to mind that the captain lost both ship and goods to a very great value, and therefore they gave it for answer that there is nothing due".

In his will, dated 20 April 1614, he names his wife Alice, sons Henry and John, daughter Elizabeth, and mentions a child not yet born, also his wife's sister, Jane Pullybancke. He names, too, his brother Christopher, his sisters and their children, several cousins and friends, the bulk of his property being left to his son Henry. Within three weeks of the announcement of the loss of Middleton's ship, his widow had married one Cannon, who on 4 December 1618, in right of Captain David Middleton, was administrator to the deceased Sir Henry Middleton.
