= Thomas Best (Royal Navy officer) =

Thomas Best (1570? – 1638?), was an English naval officer who served the East India Company and later the Royal Navy.

== Early life ==
Best is thought to have been the son of Captain George Best, who travelled the Arctic with Martin Frobisher.

== Career ==
Thomas Best is thought to have gone to sea when aged around thirteen and by 1598 he was a man of substance and repute, well known in Ratcliff and Limehouse. On 30 December 1611 he was appointed to command the Red Dragon, a ship of some 600 tons and 200 men, then fitting for a voyage to the East Indies. As well as Red Dragon, the full fleet consisted of the Osiander pinnace joined later by the James and Solomon. The ships sailed from Gravesend on 6 February 1611 (OS) 1612 (N.S.) and arrived at Surat, on the north west coast of India, at the beginning of September, much to the annoyance of the Portuguese, who had previously established themselves in the country. They collected a force of four galleons, each as large as the Red Dragon, and some twenty small craft, row-boats carrying many men, and on 29 October appeared off the mouth of the river, where they hoped to surprise the English. Best, in the Red Dragon, at once weighed anchor, stood out to meet them, and passed between two of their ships, firing into each. This caused the Portuguese to pause. The darkness closed in, and they had to anchor for the night. The next morning the Osiander also came out, and when three of the galleons, in trying to avoid the Red Dragon, got on shore, the Osiander, drawing little water, "danced the hay about them, and so payed them that they durst not show a man on their decks." The fight continued till dark of the second day. The third day was very similar to the second. Towards evening the Portuguese drew back and attempted to burn the Red Dragon by means of a hastily equipped fireship. This Best succeeded in sinking before she got dangerously near, and so the fight ended. The loss of the English was returned as three killed and one wounded; that of the Portuguese was certainly very heavy.

Some few days later the Portuguese attempted a further attack in what became known as the Battle of Swally, when Best, again standing out to sea, engaged them with such resolution and skill that after four hours' severe fighting they made all sail to get away. The flight was witnessed by thousands on the shore. The Great Mogul Jahangir was now quite willing to recognise the English as having rights equal to those of the Portuguese. Thus English trade was placed on a permanent footing, and the birth of the English power in India may properly be dated from this November 1612, rather than from any of the semi-piratical voyages of previous years.

In January 1612–13 Best in the Red Dragon, accompanied by the Osiander, left Surat, and, passing down the coast, crossed over to Aceh, where he arrived on 12 April. He described (12 July) the king and people as very griping, base, and covetous. All trade was forbidden except at Banda Aceh: but by releasing a Portuguese whom he had captured, he succeeded in winning the favour of the king, who gave him the title of Orancaya pute which is 'white or clear-hearted lord.' He also obtained permission to open a trade with Siam (now Thailand, and received assurance of good entertainment. At Bantam he obtained a grant of land on which to build warehouses, and when, having got a full cargo, he sailed in November on the return voyage, the company's affairs in the East were far more satisfactorily settled than before. The Red Dragon, "richly laden," arrived in the Downs in the first week of June 1614, and Best shortly afterwards attended the EIC Council to give a detailed account of his proceedings. He was considered to have "deserved extraordinarily well," though at the same time some dissatisfaction was expressed at "his great private trade". The question was left to the EIC governor, Sir Thomas Smythe, who gave his opinion that no one could be a fitter commander than Best, but that for merchandise Captain William Keeling was far before him, and should be sent to Surat (7 September). Best refused to go on the voyage without private trade, and a few days later (16 September), nettled, it would appear, by the refusal of the council to give his son an appointment as one of their factors, he refused to go at all. As he very shortly afterwards (27 September) signified his willingness to go another year, it is not improbable that the council gave way. Reports to his disadvantage, however, continued to be circulated, so that Best insisted on an investigation. The decision was that the company was "content to remit all that is past and let these things die, which should not have been ripped up, had he not called them in question himself" (24 October 1615).

In October 1617 the question of sending out a chief commander to Bantam came before the council, and after discussing the relative merits of Sir Richard Hawkins, Sir Thomas Dale, and others, they requested the governor to confer with Best as the fittest of all. Best accepted the appointment, and agreed to sail again in the Red Dragon, but a complaint was presently lodged against him for having appointed his son as a master's mate. On this and other matters Best took high ground; he was summoned before the court, and after some discussion and his refusal to sign a bond for £6,000 to perform the articles agreed on, he was dismissed the company's service (26 November) He afterwards (27 January 1617–18) made his peace with them, but he does not seem to have again accepted any office under the company. It is probable that Best had already served in royal ships, and from this time he was actively employed under the crown. In 1623 he commanded the Garland (a 38/48-gun galleon, built in 1590), and when the fleet sailed for Spain to bring back Prince Charles, Best remained as senior officer in the Downs. He had previously been engaged in the prevention of piracy, or the pursuit of pirates, and he would probably have had more of the same duty, had not the insolence of the Dutch, in destroying a Dunkirk privateer at Leith and blockading another at Aberdeen, rendered it necessary to send a small force to the coast of Scotland. It was determined that Best was the proper man to command this expedition; but the Bonaventure, the only other ship available, was commanded by Sir William St Leger, who held that, as a knight, he could not be under the orders of Best. The commissioners of the navy recommended that St. Leger should be superseded in the Bonaventure by some captain of 'meaner quality.' Captain Christian, who had formerly commanded the Osiander with Best, was accordingly appointed in his place. The Garland and Bonaventure sailed from Margate on 30 June, and, having gone to Abereen, brought the blockaded Dunkirker to the Downs, closely attended by two of the Dutch ships, and when, on 29 July, the convoy attempted to run off by herself, the Dutchmen would have made a prize of her if Best had not beaten them off. He vowed vengeance, but the Dutch ships outsailed him. On 4 August they had all anchored in the Downs, the Dutch at some distance, when Best slipped alongside of them in the dark, and beat them out of the road. The next day the Dutch gathered in force, and threatened summary punishment, unless he could show the king's commission for what he had done. As naval commissions then, as now, were signed only by the admiralty, Best had not the authority the Dutch required, and to evade the difficulty he was ordered to bring the ships up to Gravesend. Eventually he was superseded, and the Dunkirker was sent home with a safe-conduct from the Dutch. In 1627 Best commanded the Vanguard (19 March 1626-7), which formed part of the fleet assembled at Portsmouth under Lord Willoughby, and in the disastrous expedition to Rhé in 1627.

== Later life ==
In September 1630 he was member of a commission to report on the keeping of the king's ships at Chatham and Portsmouth, and in April 1632 of another to consider the manning of ships. In 1633 he seems to have been senior warden of Trinity House, and in 1634 to have been master; in 1637 he appears to have been still master of the Trinity House; and in April 1638 he sat on a commission for inquiring into frauds in the supply of timber. This is the last mention of him that can be traced; it seems, therefore, probable that he died shortly afterwards.
