= 1601 East India Company Voyage =

1601–03 English expedition to Malacca

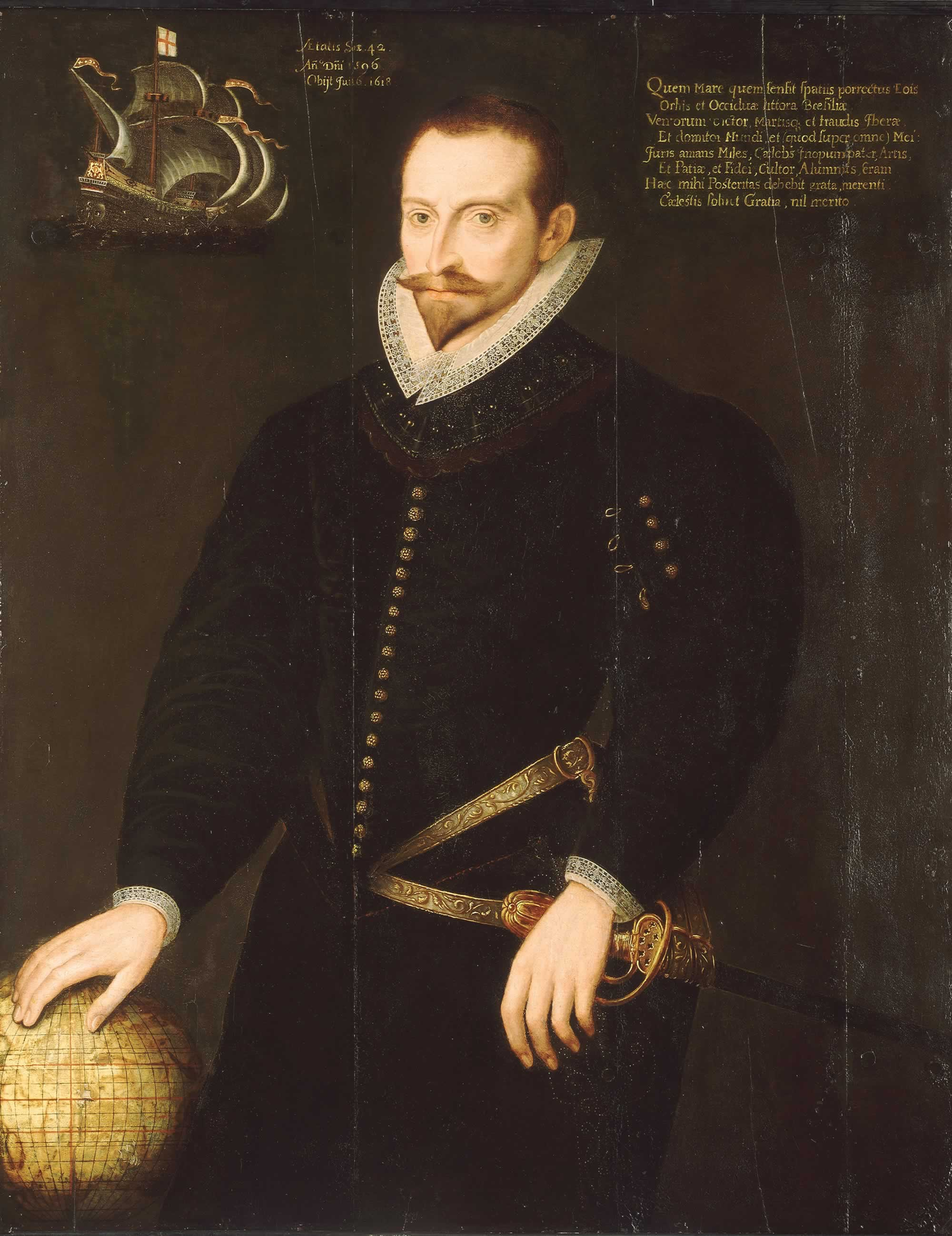
Veteran explorer James Lancaster who commanded the first East India Company voyage.

The 1601 East India Company Voyage was the first ever voyage by the newly formed English East India Company (EIC) and took place between February 1601 to August 1603 during the latter stage of the Anglo-Spanish War.

The EIC had been established in 1600 with approval from Queen Elizabeth I, and a fleet of four ships was organised and led by veteran explorer James Lancaster. The voyage hoped to break the Spanish-Portuguese domination in the lucrative spice trade. The fleet set sail from England in February 1601 entering the Indian Ocean and East Indies the following year. The fleet visited Aceh, and Lancaster struck up a good relationship with the Aceh Sultanate, but the price of pepper and spice was too high. Looking elsewhere, a Portuguese carrack was captured with the help of a small Dutch squadron in the Straits of Malacca after a short fight. From the valuable plunder taken, the EIC was able to establish a factory at Banten on Java adding to the haul of goods acquired. Another smaller factory was set up on the small island of Run in the Spice Islands.

Having secured the goods the fleet sailed on the return journey back to England. After nearly succumbing to storms and disease on the way, the fleet managed to make it back in September 1603 and Lancaster was knighted by the new King James I. The voyage was a huge success and eventually received a healthy profit, in addition the EIC had successfully breached the Spanish-Portuguese duopoly, allowing for further successful voyages. The establishment of the factories was instrumental for the birth the British Empire.

== Background ==
The English became galvanized in expeditions to explore the New World following Francis Drake's circumnavigation of the world between 1577 and 1580, and after the Spanish Armada's defeat in 1588. The captured Spanish and Portuguese ships, with their rutters and cargoes enabled English voyagers to learn more about the secret trade routes around the globe in search of riches.

By the 1590s the war with Spain and Portugal was at a deadlock, in addition trade in luxury goods, particularly spices had slowed and prices soared, and there was a need to break into the market. Privateering although fruitful at times, was not enough. With demand growing Queen Elizabeth I gave permission for a fleet led by James Lancaster and financed by the Levant Company to sail to the Indian Ocean and the East Indies to break the duopoly of the dominant Spanish-Portuguese Mare clausum in the lucrative spice trade. This part of the world had been apportioned to Portugal under the Treaty of Tordesillas. The first voyage left in 1591 and managed to reach India the following year. Having sailed around Cape Comorin to the Malay Peninsula, Lancaster's fleet preyed on Portuguese ships in and near the Straits of Malacca, in which a number were captured. The return journey however was a disaster with only twenty-five officers and men surviving to reach England in May 1594. Lancaster was left marooned in the West Indies until a lucky encounter with a French ship allowed his safe return.

In the meantime the Dutch who were allied in their fight with England against the Iberian Union had sent their First expedition in 1595. This voyage was instrumental in opening up the spice trade to the merchants on its return two years later. Elizabeth however delayed any such expedition to the East Indies due to potential Anglo-Spanish peace talks which eventually took place in Boulogne in 1600. The talks quickly broke down and while the English dithered the Dutch had already sent another expedition which had just returned that same year making huge profits. The so-called 'Spice Race' had already been won, but the English were still galvanized to be a part of it.

Instead of using an existing company which was set on trading in the Levant, a new company was formed on 31 December 1600 focusing on trade in the East Indies. The East India Company (EIC) was thus granted permission by Elizabeth I with Thomas Smythe as its first governor.

In 1601 a new fleet was organised and set up by Lancaster who also carried a letter from Elizabeth I, utilizing both diplomacy and force to establish English influence in the area and disrupt Portuguese trade.

=== Fleet ===
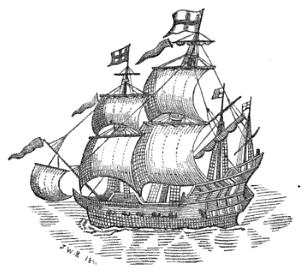
Lancaster's flagship "Red Dragon"

The flagship of the five-vessel EIC fleet was the 600 ton galleon Malice Scourge which had been built for privateering against the Spanish in the West Indies. It was purchased from its owner the Earl of Cumberland for £3,700; he had initially asked for £4,000.

There was at first some reluctance on the part of the EIC to acquire the vessel due to its size and weight, but saw the value in its power.

The fleet was established at the Woolwich ship yards with Henry Middleton working on the flagship Malice Scourge. The Company subsequently renamed the vessel Red Dragon, and granted command of the vessel to James Lancaster. Second in command was Middleton's brother John, a company captain who secured Henry as a mercantile agent with a berth on the voyage. The other vessels in the fleet were powerful Levant company vessels; Hector (300 tons), Ascension (260 tons), Susan (240 tons). There was also the Gift (120 tons) which was the fleet victualler. As well as John Middelton, other chief factors of the company accompanied the fleet; John Harvard and William Brund, and were to sail on the Hector. The Pilot-Major for the fleet was the explorer John Davis; a veteran of the first Dutch expedition. Davis would prove valuable as he had carefully charted and recorded geographical details for the Dutch. For his part Davis was to receive £500 (around £1.5 million at 2015 values). In all the fleet mustered some 480 men, also and included a number of Dutchmen.

== Voyage ==
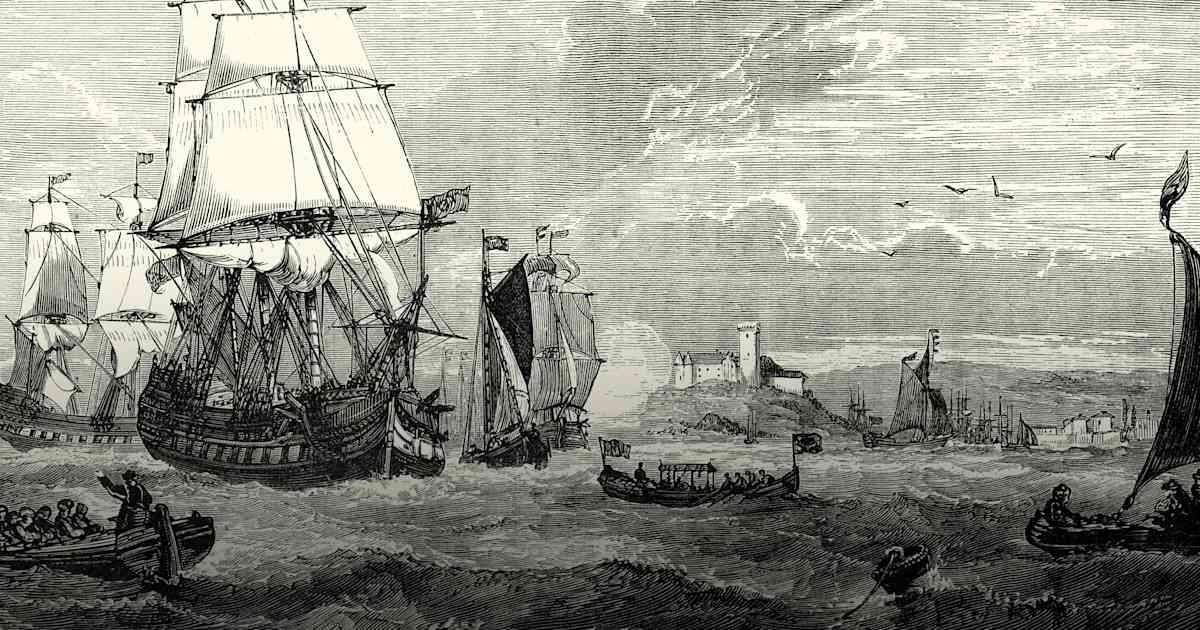
Illustration of the 'First fleet of the East India Company leaving Woolwich, 1601'

The fleet departed on 13 February 1601, but despite this they did not clear the English Channel until early April due to delays from contrary winds. They sailed towards the Canary Islands, and arriving there, they took in supplies of fresh water under the noses of the Spanish. Following on a fair wind which kept them close to the African coastline, they then fell into the Doldrums, where they remained for nearly a month. A Portuguese vessel was sighted having accidentally separated from its fleet. Lancaster ordered its seizure, and the five ships circled the vessel which they took easily. The crew were disarmed and the ship pillaged and its provisions which included 146 butts of wine, 176 jars of various oils and meal shared amongst the five vessels. They set sail on a light wind and crossed the Southern Hemisphere. During this time the Guest was stripped of any use and set adrift.

With a few weeks however much of the fleet was affected by scurvy by the time they arrived at Table Bay on 9 September. Lancaster had managed to prevent the sailors on his own ship from being so stricken by regularly dosing them with lemon juice. He was forced to send members of his own crew to help man the other ships into the harbour. At Table Bay Lancaster encamped near the shore for the men to rest and recuperate, some 105 were sick or dying. Lancaster meanwhile met up with the local natives asking for beef and mutton of which there was plenty, and good relations were established. The refreshing time was a great success, after nearly seven weeks, all but five of the sick had recovered well. On 24 October, they set sail and went round the Cape of Good Hope.

=== Indian Ocean ===
They navigated round the Cape and into the Indian ocean passing on the eastern side of Madagascar. Adverse wind conditions and a second bout of scurvy, forced the fleet to drop anchor in Antongil Bay, where they remained from Christmas Day through until 6 March 1602. Trade with the locals was poor and a number of the crew during this time contracted diseases, especially after drinking contaminated water. Red Dragon's surgeon, preacher and ten others succumbed. During a funeral for one victim, the captain of the Ascension was accidentally shot and killed during a commemoration volley fire whilst rowing to shore. Morale was at a low ebb, but Lancaster ensured that the voyage must go on.

On the resumption of their journey, they reached Agaléga island, where an anchorage had been found for a brief refreshment. There was an abundance of Coconut trees as well as a number of fowl (Booby). The fleet moved on a few days later.

They then reached the Chagos Islands; here navigation was dangerous due to the numerous reefs. They carefully navigated them and included a brief stop on of the islands on 16 March. Next stop was at the Nicobar Islands, and the fleet took the opportunity to take on water and trim their vessels, and a base was set up near one of the island's shores. Trade however was poor with the locals who were offering inflated prices and fake items. After nearly three weeks the fleet moved on South East.

On 5 June, the fleet arrived in the road of Achin, on the northern end of Sumatra. There, Lancaster sent Middleton to request an audience with the King Ala-uddin Shah, Iskandar Muda. Middleton was well received by the King, he and his officials were delighted by the visit of Englishmen after hearing about tales of the defeat of the Spanish Armada fourteen years previous. Lancaster wanted to deliver the Queen's letter in person to the king and so the latter sent a welcome party of Elephants to greet him. The King was fascinated with the Queen 'by reason of the warres and victories against the King of Spain'. Lancaster and the factors were held in high esteem, the King inviting them to lavish feast. After negotiations had concluded the King was delighted at the prospect of trade with the English, and was happy to grant them an exemption from customs dues. Negotiations were concluded and the English went on the way to procure spices.

The goods at Achin however proved a disappointment, the recent crop of pepper had been poor with the best ones selling at extortionate prices. Other spices and commodities were hard to find and those that were available were also too expensive. What goods were bought failed to even fill one of the ships. Lancaster went back to the Sultan and asked for permission to sail to other ports, and this was granted. Susan under Middleton was sent onwards to Priaman on the west coast of Sumatra where he procured substantial quantities of pepper and cloves.

=== Capture of the São Antonio ===
Battle of the Malacca Strait
- Part of the Anglo–Spanish War
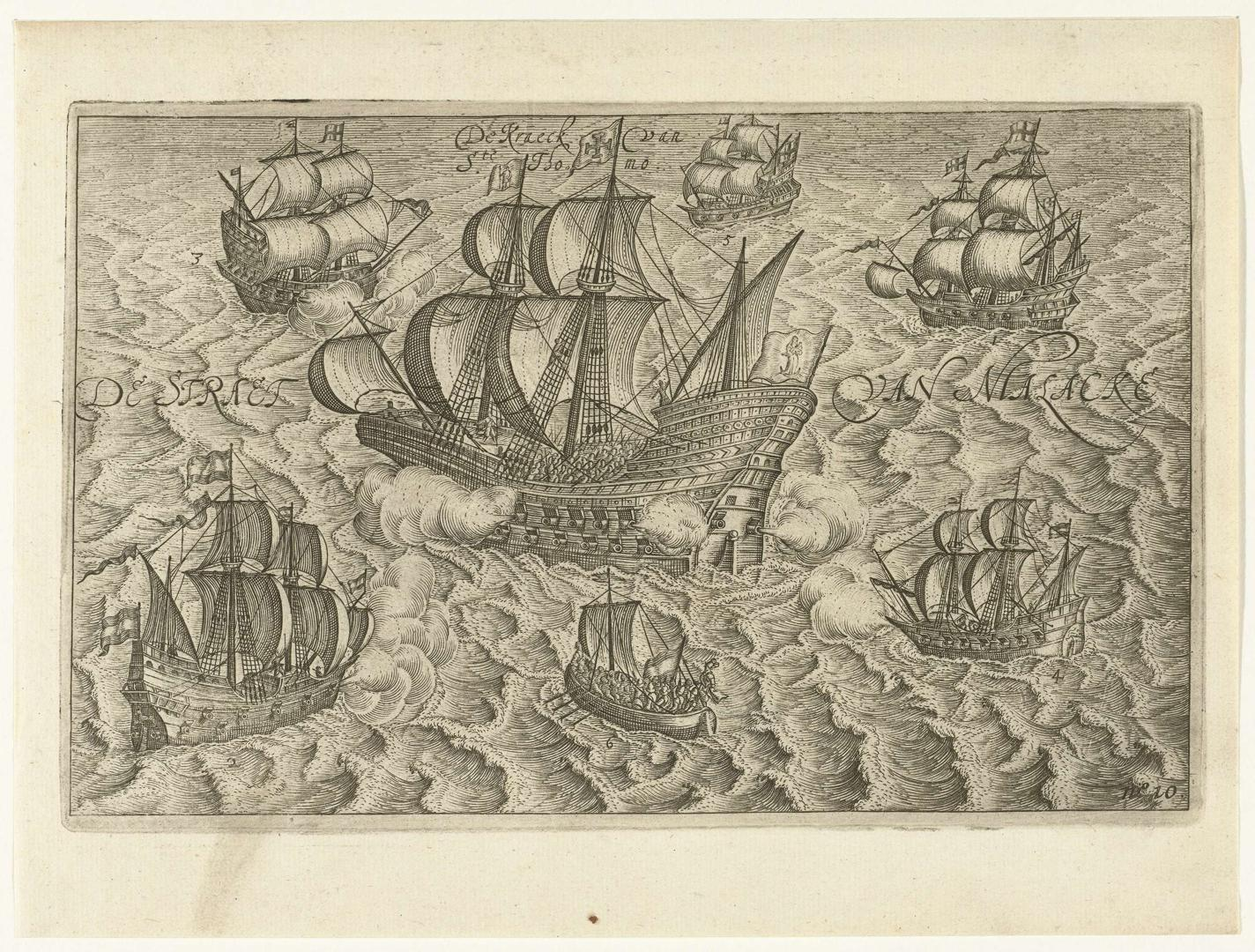
- Print from Floris Balthasar showing the Anglo-Dutch capture of the Portuguese carrack São Antonio in the Malacca Straits
| Date | 15 October 1602 |
| Location | Malacca Strait |
| Result | Anglo-Dutch victory |

Belligerents
| (Spain) Iberian Union: Portugal | England: East India Company; Dutch Republic |

Commanders and leaders
| Unknown | (Kingdom of England) James Lancaster (Dutch Republic) Joris van Spilbergen |

Strength
| 1 Carrack | 3 English ships 2 Dutch ships |

Casualties and losses
| 1 carrack captured 600 crew captured | none |

Whilst at Achin Lancaster had some intrigues with the Portuguese ambassador who had become suspicious of the English since their arrival. The ambassador planned to go to Malacca and gather a force to push the English out. Lancaster asked the Sultan to delay his departure by any means, so that Lancaster could leave before him, and the Sultan agreed. On 24 June the Dutch pinnace Lam which had got lost after being separated from a Dutch squadron led by Joris van Spilbergen arrived at Achin . Lancaster purchased the vessel which became a new addition to the English fleet. Spilbergen did arrive with the rest of his squadron, the Ram and Schaap,. Lancaster and Spilbergen met to discuss mutual trade prospects and both agreed the best way was to target Portuguese vessels in the Strait of Malacca and increase their cargo. On 9 September they both set sail and went on the hunt.

On 4 October 1602, a large Portuguese galleon was sighted by Hector in the Straits, Lancaster and Spilbergen decided to engage. The battle was short - six cannon shots was all it took to split the main yard in two which came crashing down, and soon after the Portuguese captain unable to maneuver, surrendered the vessel. The prize turned out to be the São Antonio of some 900–1,000 tons which had sailed from São Thomé in India. The English boarded the vessel taking some 600 prisoners, and then inspected the cargo.

Over the next four days the captors unloaded all the goods – some 960 bales of white and painted textiles, eighty chests of Pintados, forty other wooden chests containing various goods of calicoes and other produce were transferred onto the English ships. In addition large amounts of food were seized – rice, oil and provisions for the 600 crew. Although the lack of silver and gold taken was disappointing the Dutch and English were still impressed by the haul – in all worth some 132,000 Rials. Once the plunder has been complete and settled (the Dutch were happy to receive one eighth of the share with the English). The Portuguese prisoners were released and the São Antonio was given back. All parties went their separate ways - the Dutch went to Ceylon to sell their share of goods there, whilst the EIC fleet headed back to Achin.

=== East Indies ===
The fleet returned to Achin on 24 October; Lancaster presented gifts from the captured Portuguese carrack to the King who was delighted, and congratulated Lancaster on the victory. Lancaster decided to leave altogether and bid farewell to the King. During a final audience with the King, Lancaster was presented with a letter and gifts to Queen Elizabeth. The three ships left Achin on 9 November, and two days later the Ascension was dispatched to return to England as it was fully laden with various goods. Red Dragon and Hector sailed to Priaman, and Lancaster delivered instructions that when Susan had finished loading her cargo of pepper and spices, she should set sail after Ascension.

Lancaster pressed his remaining two vessels on towards Java, arriving at Bantam on 16 December. Lancaster arranged a meeting with the reigning monarch, the young Pangaran Ratu - the power resting with Ratu's uncle. Lancaster presented a porcelain plate and a letter from the Queen to him. The English were remembered from when Francis Drake had visited some twenty years earlier during his circumnavigation and had been given permission to return and help fight against the Portuguese. Relations between the two were highly positive and Lancaster was granted permission by the protector to trade freely and "settle a factorie". Here pepper and spices were selling at far lower prices which relieved Lancaster. They were able to trade all their remaining English goods for almost 300 bags of pepper.

At Bantam the English planned to develop a settlement and to prepare it for the arrival of the next EIC fleet. They were also instructed to buy spices and sell the unsold looted Portuguese textiles at good prices, and explore trading links and opportunities in Asia. They also received news that the Dutch had established a factory nearby and in other islands. This concerned Lancaster, but the thought of competition with a Protestant ally was not on their minds. During their stay, John Middleton of the Hector fell sick and was brought ashore but died soon after. Lancaster did not replace him and the vessel was put under the command of Master Alexander Cole.

A factory at Bantam was established with eight factors headed by William Starkey as Chief Factor and Thomas Morgan as his deputy. Lancaster ordered that a 40-ton locally acquired pinnace be put together at Bantam. With twelve men led by Master Keche, they were to go to the Moluccas specifically Tidore and Ternate – which was where the main source of cloves and nutmeg grew.

=== Voyage home ===
With a letter of reply to the Queen from Ratu and all trade agreements granted the two ships set sail on their return to England on 20 February 1603.

The return journey proceeded without incident until they had rounded the Cape of Good Hope, when they were caught in a heavy and sudden storm. During the storm, Red Dragon's rudder broke off, leaving the ship at the mercy of the ocean. The ship's carpenter tried to build an improvised rudder to try to steady the ship's course, but in the rough seas it provided no relief. In spite of his crew's pleas to transfer to Hector, Lancaster insisted that the crew remain on Red Dragon, telling his crew that they would "yet abide Gods leisure." Despite the confidence he had shown his crew, he ordered Hector to leave them and return to England. When morning broke, the storm cleared, and Hector was not yet over the horizon; their captain having been reluctant to leave Red Dragon while she was in distress. Another new rudder was made, this time using wood from the mizzenmast, and the best swimmers and divers from the two ships hung it securely in place.

On 16 June, the fleet sighted St Helena; here they anchored and landed, acquiring fresh water and livestock. They learned from recent fires and other signs that the Portuguese Atlantic fleet had left only a week earlier. The crew went inland and caught wild goats which roamed the island in large numbers. The sick men were also sent ashore so their health could recover. The ships were careened and Red Dragons rudder was also checked and reinforced.

Red Dragon and Hector set sail on 5 July sailing past Ascension Island the following week. With a fair wind they sailed past the Azores by the end of the following month. On 9 September they spotted Land's End and eventually arrived in the South Downs on 11 September, three months after Ascension.

=== Establishment of factories ===
At Bantam the team led by Starkey established the settlement. A new building was erected and eventually called the 'English house', adorned with an English flag, and a small warehouse was built close to the harbour. To impress the Bantanese, Starkey had his men dressed with scarves of white and red taffeta to match the colour of the English flag. They paraded within the confines of the English House with pipes and drums. This strategy worked and impressed the Bantanese; it was designed to make other outsiders such as the Portuguese and the Dutch to look inferior. Starkey and his men were not only invited to Ratu's court functions, but were given high priority over all others.

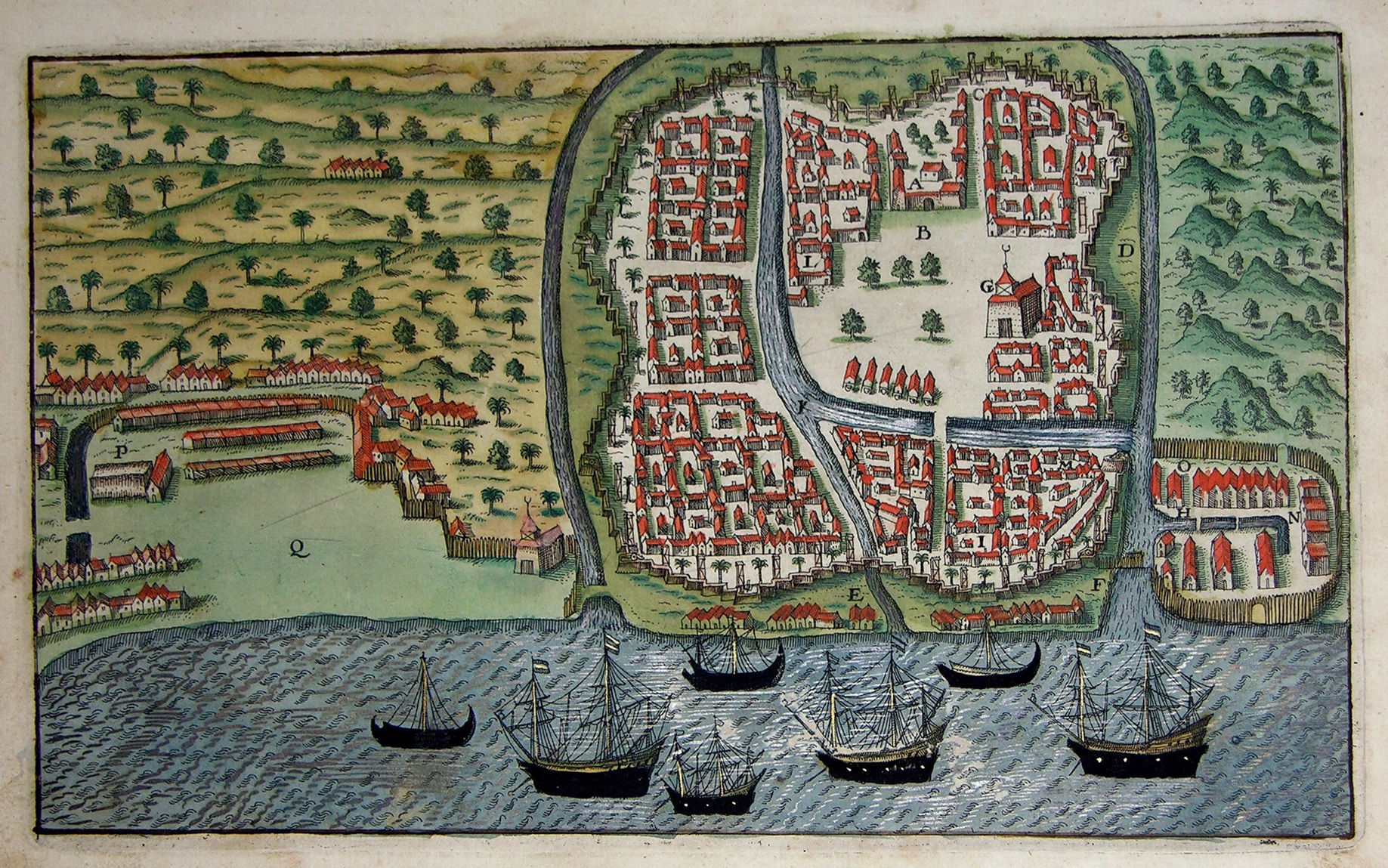
16th century view of Bantam

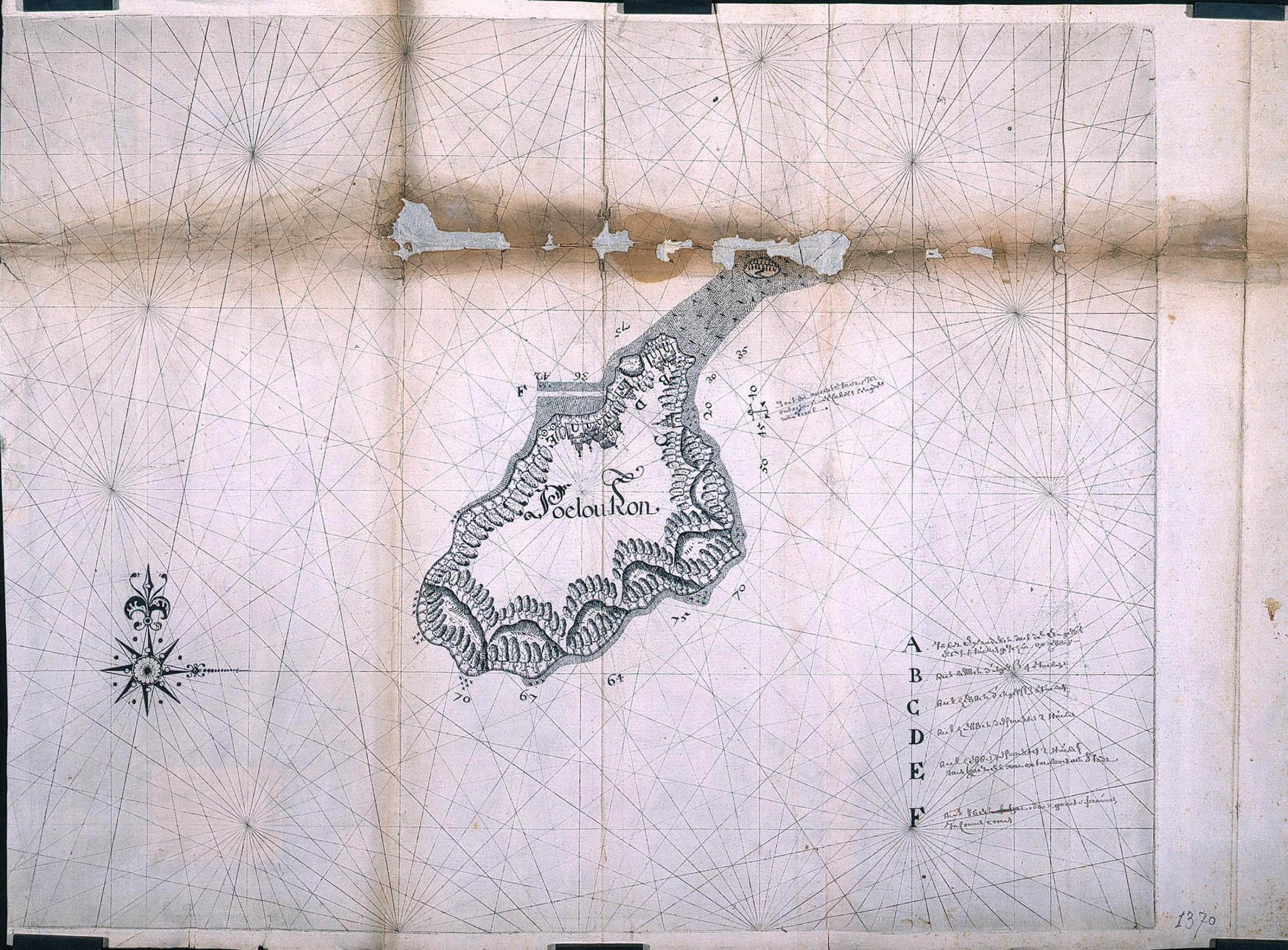
The island of Run

A few months after the establishment of Bantam, Master Keche's completed pinnace sailed towards the Moluccas. A storm during the journey nearly put paid to operation - the Moluccas were missed completely. The small party was swept instead further south west towards the Banda Islands. The first island they came across was the Island of Run, which though small as it was, had a large plantation of Myristica fragrans (Nutmeg) trees. This discovery delighted Keche, and appealed to the islanders to trade. They welcomed the men, and Keche, having met the ruler who allowed them to stay and to trade the nutmeg. A small factory was quickly established here too; a flimsy bamboo thatched warehouse on the island's northern coastline.

== Aftermath ==
Lancaster returned to find much had changed, Elizabeth had died in March the previous year and James I was the new king. London had been hit by a plague and the fleet had turned up at its highest peak, and much of the city was deserted. Despite the gloom, Lancaster was received by the recently crowned James. He was impressed by Lancaster's presentation of the letters from the Kings of Achin and Bantam, and was subsequently Knighted for his duties. The profits from the voyage were however minimal, the sheer quantity of goods making them hard to find buyers for, especially during the plague. Eventually by 1609 the voyage would make a profit of 95% at around 8% per annum.

With the establishment of 'Factories' the company had laid the foundation for ongoing trade leaving precise instructions for safe guarding existing stock as well as acquiring, buying and selling more. The company on its first voyage had therefore successfully and profitably breached the Spanish and Portuguese duopoly. This meant new horizons had opened for the English. The success of the voyage was significant for the growth of England (and later Great Britain) as a colonial power; the Island of Run effectively became the first ever overseas English possession.

A second Voyage of the EIC to the East Indies was planned soon after. The same three ships that had made the previous voyage, with Red Dragon now under the command of Sir Henry Middleton were repaired and fitted out. The fleet departed Gravesend on 25 March 1604, although England was still at war with Spain and Portugal James had ceased issuing letters of marque due to peace negotiations with Spain. Middleton was under strict instructions not to attack any Spanish or Portuguese shipping. The war was finally concluded five months after their departure with the London Treaty. In the treaty English demands for the right to trade in the East and West Indies, were adamantly opposed by Spain and there was a deadlock during the talks. Once the treaty had been signed however there wasn't any mention of the matter, which was highly beneficial to the English.

The second voyage also went for the islands of Ternate, Tidore, Ambon and Banda in the Moluccas. They stopped off at Bantam, where they found that seven of the eight factors had perished with Morgan in April and Starkey, in June 1603. Starkey was succeeded as Governor by Edmund Scott who kept the factory running at a profit, much to the delight of Middleton.

This voyage was also a success, but for the first time they encountered severe hostility with the newly formed Dutch East India Company. This saw the beginning of Anglo-Dutch competition for access to spices. The Dutch, having established a factory at Banda Neira were now concerned; an Admiral having learnt of the English establishment on Run in 1603, lodged a protest. The Dutch tried to obtain a local monopsony in the spice trade by keeping out the factors of other European countries by force of arms. This culminated in the infamous Amboyna Massacre in 1623, which itself led to the Anglo-Dutch wars of the seventeenth century. During the Treaty of Breda in 1667, the island of Run itself would be given to the Dutch (as well as other territories) in exchange for the island of Manhattan, later New York.

== See also ==
- Invasion of the Spice Islands

== Bibliography ==
- Andrews, Kenneth R (1985). Trade, Plunder, and Settlement: Maritime Enterprise and the Genesis of the British Empire, 1480–1630. Cambridge, UK: Cambridge University Press. ISBN 978-0-521-25760-2.
- Boyajian, James C. (2008). Portuguese Trade in Asia Under the Habsburgs, 1580–1640. Johns Hopkins University Press. ISBN 9780801887543.
- Carpenter, Kenneth J (1986). The History of Scurvy and Vitamin C. Cambridge University Press. ISBN 9780521347730.
- Chaudhuri, K. N (1965). The English East India Company: The Study of an Early Joint-stock Company 1600–1640. Taylor & Francis. ISBN 978-0415190763.
- Dalby, Andrew (2000). Dangerous Tastes. The Story of Spices. University of California Press. ISBN 9780520236745.
- Dulles, Foster Rhea (1931). Eastward ho! The first English adventurers to the Orient (1969 ed.). Freeport, New York: Books for Libraries Press. ISBN 0-8369-1256-X.
- Foster, William (1988). England's quest of eastern trade (1933 ed.). London: A. & C. Black. ISBN 9780415155182.
- Franks, Michael (2006). The Basingstoke Admiral A Life of Sir James Lancaster (c. 1554 - 1618). Hobnob Press. ISBN 9780946418596.
- Hart, Jonathan (2008). Empires and Colonies Empires and Colonies. Polity. ISBN 978-0745626130.
- Keay, John (1991). The Honourable Company: A History of the English East India Company. HarperCollins UK. ISBN 0002175150.
- Hammer, Paul E J (2003). Elizabeth's Wars: War, Government and Society in Tudor England, 1544–1604. Palgrave Macmillan. ISBN 978-1137173386.
- Lenman, Bruce (2014). England's Colonial Wars 1550-1688 Conflicts, Empire and National Identity. Taylor & Francis. ISBN 9781317898818.
- Markham, Clements R, ed. (1877). The Voyages of Sir James Lancaster, Kt., to the East Indies. New York: Burt Franklin. OL 23357754M.
- Milton, Giles (1999). Nathaniel's Nutmeg (reissue, illustrated ed.). Penguin Books. ISBN 978-0-14-029260-2. OCLC 44871451.
- Rowse, A. L (1973). The Expansion of Elizabethan England. Cardinal Books. ISBN 978-0351180644.
- Screech, Timon (2020). The Shogun's Silver Telescope God, Art, and Money in the English Quest for Japan, 1600-1625. Oxford University Press. ISBN 9780198832034.
- Wernham, Richard Bruce (1994). The Return of the Armadas: The Last Years of the Elizabethan Wars Against Spain 1595–1603. Oxford: Clarendon Press. ISBN 978-0-19-820443-5.
- Williams, Neville (1975). The Sea Dogs Privateers, Plunder and Piracy in the Elizabethan Age. Macmillan Publishing Company. ISBN 9780297770114.
