= Red Dragon (ship) =

English sailing ship

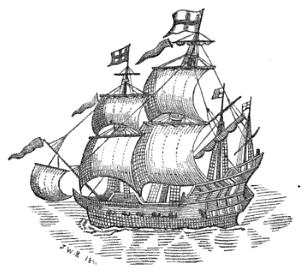
- Red Dragon, Captain Lancaster, in the Strait of Malacca, Anno 1602.

History

England
- Name: Scourge of Malice (1595–1600); Red Dragon (1601–unknown)
- Owner: Earl of Cumberland (1595–1600)
- Operator: East India Company (1601–1619)
- Builder: Deptford Dockyard
- Launched: 1595
- Honours and awards: Participated in: Second Battle of San Juan (1598); Battle of the Malacca Strait; Battle of Swally (1612)
- Fate: Sunk by Dutch fleet, 1619

General characteristics
- Type: Armed ship
- Tons burthen: 600–900, or 960 (bm)
- Propulsion: Sails
- Armament: 38 guns: 2 × demi-cannons, 16 × culverins, 12 × demi-culverins, 8 × sakers

Scourge of Malice or Malice Scourge or Mare Scourge was a 38-gun ship ordered by George Clifford, 3rd Earl of Cumberland. She was built and launched at Deptford Dockyard in 1595. The Earl used her as his flagship during raids on the Spanish Main, where she provided additional force to support his fleet. She was later renamed Red Dragon; the East India Company used her for at least five voyages to the East Indies. The first recorded non-European performance of the play Hamlet took place on Red Dragon in 1607 while she was anchored off the coast of Sierra Leone.

== Construction ==
In the 1590s, the Earl of Cumberland's passion for nautical adventure was at its peak. He lacked a vessel able to support his hired fleet; the only option he had to get a sufficiently well-armed vessel was to borrow from the Queen, something which would give her significant control over his actions. As a result, he declared that he would have his own ship built, 'the best and largest ship that had been built by any English subject.' The ship is variously recorded as being between 600 and 900 tons and was named by Queen Elizabeth I as Scourge of Malice.

== Service history ==
=== Raiding the Spanish Main (1598) ===
Having had Scourge of Malice built, the Earl then departed in his new ship, along with three smaller vessels, on another expedition to raid the Spanish Main. However, the fleet had only travelled as far as Plymouth when the Queen recalled him to London. He returned, leaving the remainder of the small fleet to continue without him. On their return, he travelled out with them again; however on this voyage, Scourge of Malice was badly damaged in a violent storm only forty leagues from England, her mainmast being damaged, and he was once more forced to return to seek repairs.

With the repairs completed, the Earl set sail yet again on 6 March 1598. Scourge of Malice was now the flagship of a fleet numbering twenty vessels.

After Sir Francis Drake's defeat at San Juan in 1595, the Earl of Cumberland was under orders to capture Brazil from the Spanish. Following Drake's attack, 200 men and 150 volunteers, bolstered by a further 200 men when reinforcements arrived from Spain, garrisoned the fort at San Juan. By the time the Earl's fleet appeared off the coast of the islands on 16 June 1598, many of the Spanish soldiers had lost their discipline and turned to theft due to dysentery and the lack of food. Two initial attacks by the English were fruitless, costing them lives without any gain; the Earl of Cumberland himself almost drowned trying to cross the San Antonio channel. Knowing that the Spanish were short of supplies, the English preferred to lay siege to the castle of El Morro rather than destroy it, and on 29 June allowed the Spanish commander and troops to leave. During the attack on the town, the English had only lost 200 men, but over the next two months they lost 400 to an epidemic of dysentery, and after occupying the island for only 65 days, Cumberland abandoned the fort. Before they left, Cumberland's men sacked the town, making off with the cathedral bells, 2,000 slaves and a marble windowsill that caught the eye of Cumberland.

The fleet continued to raid Spanish settlements in the West Indies, achieving far more for Cumberland's country than his own pocket. The sale of his captures garnered him about a tenth of the money that he had invested in the voyage. In addition, the fleet had lost two vessels and over a thousand men.

=== East India Company, First Voyage (1601–1603) ===
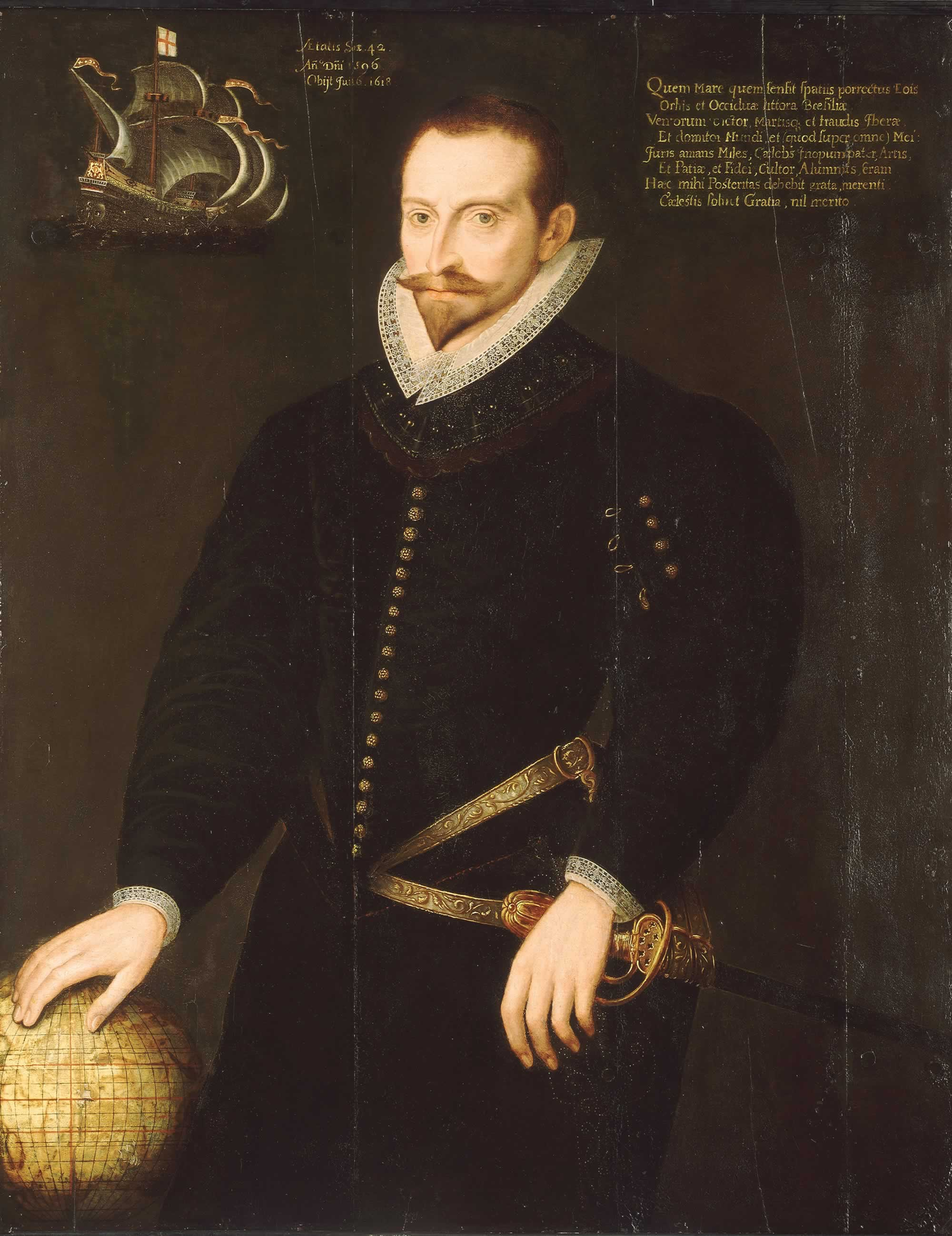
During Red Dragon's first voyage to the East Indies, she was commanded by James Lancaster.

Formed on 31 December 1600, the East India Company's (EIC) first voyage departed on 13 February 1601. The flagship of the five-vessel fleet was Malice Scourge, purchased from the Earl of Cumberland for £3700; he had initially asked for £4000. There was at first some reluctance on the part of the EIC to acquire the vessel "her burthen being so great, whereby the Tunage agreed uppon shallbe so greatly exceeded" but they relented "to the ende the preparation of the viage [voyage] be not hindred by restinge in uncertentie of shipping.") The Company subsequently renamed the vessel Red Dragon, and granted command of the vessel to James Lancaster. The other vessels in the fleet were Hector (300 tons), Ascension (260 tons), Susan (240 tons) and Guest, a small victualler. In spite of their February departure, the fleet did not clear the English Channel until early April due to delays from contrary winds. They landed at the Canary Islands, and then, keeping too close to Africa, fell into the Doldrums, where they remained for a month. They replenished their provisions from a captured Portuguese vessel en route, but much of the fleet was affected by scurvy by the time they arrived at Table Bay on 9 September. Lancaster had managed to prevent the sailors on his own ship from being so stricken by regularly dosing them with lemon juice, and he was forced to send members of his own crew to help man the other ships into the harbour. They stayed at Table Bay for seven weeks before departing, navigating along the eastern side of Madagascar. Since leaving England, they had lost more than a fifth of their crew complement across the fleet, but those that remained were fit and healthy. Adverse wind conditions, and a second bout of scurvy, forced the fleet to drop anchor in Antongil Bay, where they remained from Christmas Day through until 6 March 1602. On the resumption of their journey, they reached the Nicobar Islands after two months further travel, and took the opportunity to take on water and trim their vessels, staying for three weeks.

On 5 June, the fleet arrived in the road of Achin, on the northern end of Sumatra. There, Lancaster contacted the King, Ala-uddin Shah, who was delighted at the prospect of trade with the English, and granted them an exemption from customs dues. The goods at Achin failed to even fill one of the ships, and with Susan having already been sent to Priaman to try and procure pepper and spices, Lancaster decided to target Portuguese vessels in the Strait of Malacca to increase his cargo. The mission was successful, a Portuguese carrack of 900–1,000 tons called the São Thomé was captured. The vessel had sailed from San Thomé (now part of Chennai), and the goods of calicoes and other produce were transferred onto the English ships. The fleet then returned to Achin on 24 October 1602 and collected King Ala-uddin Shah's reply to the Queen. The three ships left Achin on 9 November, and two days later the Ascension was dispatched to return to England as it was fully laden. Red Dragon and Hector sailed to Priaman, and Lancaster delivered instructions that when Susan had finished loading her cargo of pepper and spices, she should set sail after Ascension. Lancaster pressed his remained two vessels on towards Java, arriving at Bantam on 16 December. As in Achin, they presented a letter from Queen Elizabeth I to the reigning monarch, and were granted permission to trade freely and "settle a factorie". They traded all of their remaining English goods for almost 300 bags of pepper and set up an additional factory in the Moluccas before leaving.

With a letter of reply from the King of Bantam, the two ships set sail on their return journey to England on 20 February 1603. The return journey proceeded without incident until they had rounded the Cape of Good Hope, when they were caught in a heavy and sudden storm. During the storm, Red Dragon's rudder broke off, leaving the ship at the mercy of the ocean. The ship's carpenter tried to build an improvised rudder to try to steady the ship's course, but in the rough seas it provided no relief. In spite of his crew's pleas to transfer to Hector, Lancaster insisted that the crew remain on Red Dragon, telling his crew that they would "yet abide Gods leisure." Despite the confidence he had shown his crew, he ordered Hector to leave them and return to England. When morning broke, the storm cleared as suddenly as it had appeared, and Hector was not yet over the horizon; their captain having been reluctant to leave Red Dragon while she was in distress. Another new rudder was made, this time using wood from the mizzenmast, and the best swimmers and divers from the two ships hung it securely in place. After undergoing further repairs at St Helena, Red Dragon and Hector eventually arrived back in England on 11 September 1603, three months after Ascension. Lancaster was knighted by the newly crowned King James I most likely upon his presentation of the letters from the Kings of Achin and Bantam, for his duties, but the profits from the voyage were minimal, the sheer quantity of goods making them hard to find buyers for.

=== East India Company, Second Voyage (1604–1605) ===
The Second Voyage of the East India Company to the East Indies was made by the same four ships that had made the previous voyage, with Red Dragon now under the command of Sir Henry Middleton. The fleet departed Gravesend on 25 March 1604 during the night, but when they stopped at the Downs, it was discovered that they were forty men short of their complement, and so had to wait for the remaining men. On 1 April, Red Dragon took on twenty-eight men, and despite this, Middleton was determined to set sail to make use of the beneficial wind conditions. When a new muster of the men was taken, it was found that they were now twenty-eight men over their complement; and on contacting the other vessels, they found the same trend amongst them also. Angry that he had lost use of a fair wind waiting for men he had not needed, and now would have to lose further use of it due to having to deposit those same men back to land, Middleton ordered that they should sail on to Plymouth and discharge the men there. Despite these delays, the fleet passed Cabo da Roca on 7 April, and by 15 April had reached the Canary Islands. They anchored at Maio, Cape Verde on 24 April, and set ashore in search of fresh food and water. The following day, Middleton did not go ashore, but sent the three other captains to keep their men from straggling, an order reiterated by Captain Stiles, and then by master Durham, a merchant. They were due to set sail early the next morning, but before the anchor had been raised, Captain Stiles sent word to Red Dragon that master Durham was missing. A search party numbering 150 men was sent out to search for him, but after a day's hunting failed to find the missing merchant, Middleton resolved to leave without him.

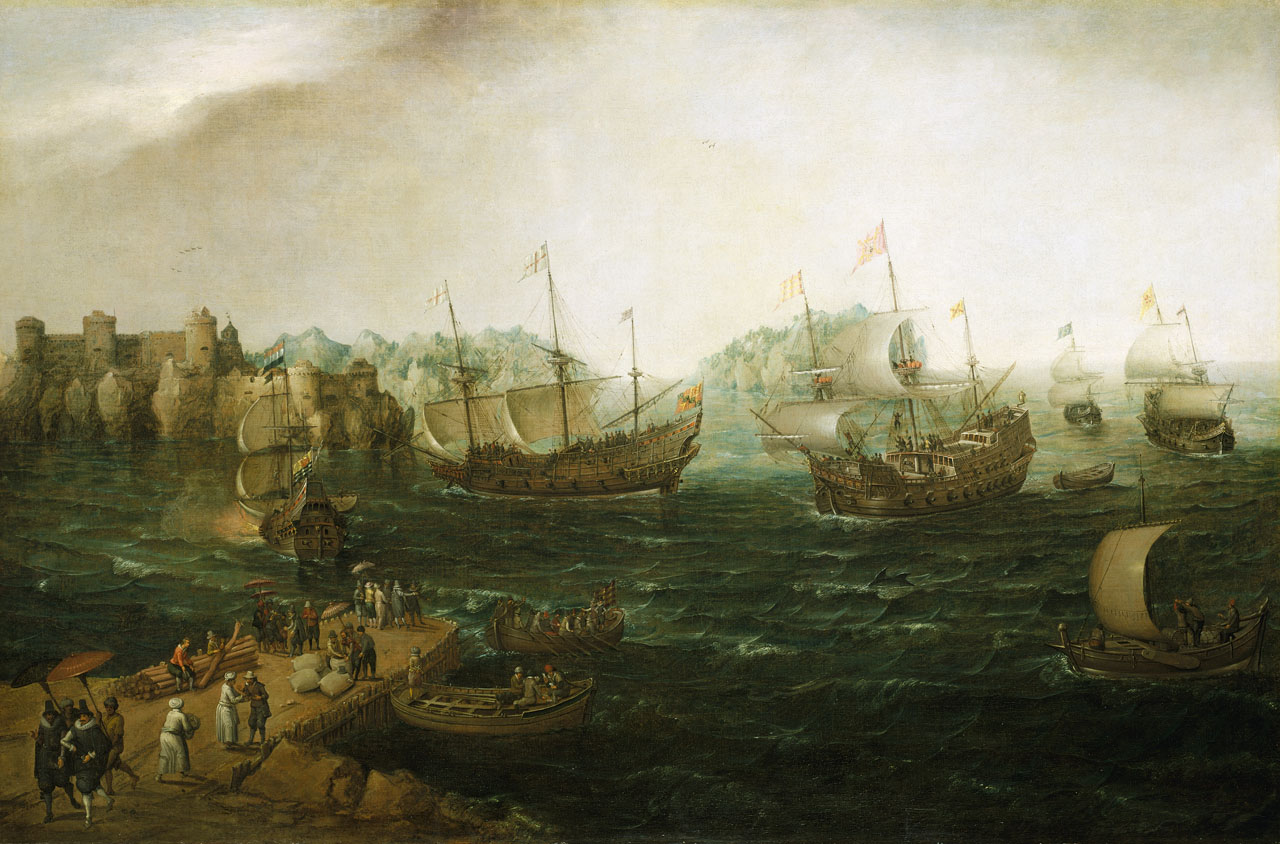
1614 painting by Hendrick Cornelisz Vroom showing English, Dutch and Spanish ships in a bay in the East Indies.

The fleet crossed the equator on 16 May, and sighted the Cape of Good Hope just under two months later, 13 July. By this stage at least eighty of Red Dragon's crew were suffering from scurvy, and although Middleton wanted to press on with the voyage and round the Cape, his crew protested and asked to put ashore to recover. The weather played against them, and it was six days before they could get their sick on land. Having landed at Table Bay, the company traded successfully with the local inhabitants, securing over two hundred sheep, a number of beeves, kine and a bullock. On 3 August, the general (Middleton) took Red Dragon's pinnace and a company of men in other boats to hunt whales in the bay. The first harpoon to take a solid hold came from the pinnace of Susan, which was then dragged up and down the bay for half an hour until they were forced to cut the rope to ensure their own safety. The next shot that held came from the general's pinnace, and had this time struck a younger, smaller whale. As with Susan's pinnace before it, the boat was towed back and forth in the bay, while the larger whale stayed with them, harrying the boats with blows. One such blow on the general's pinnace broke the timbers, causing the boat to flood and Middleton to take refuge on another of the boats. With great difficulty, the pinnace was rescued and brought ashore where it took the ship's carpenters three days to repair. Eventually the larger whale abandoned its companion, which took until sunset to die from its wounds, after which it was dragged to shore. The oil from the whale was intended for their lamps, but a combination of the small size of the whale and bad casks provided the company with less than they would have liked.

Following attacks from the native population, the fleet's company returned to their ships on 14 August, and then, with fair winds, set sail five days later. On 21 December, the fleet anchored within the islands of Sumatra, having lost a number of men to scurvy, and with a number of those that remained weakened. Due to illness, Middleton was unable to land and present the King of Bantam with a letter from King James until 31 December. It was then decided that Red Dragon and Ascension would proceed to the Maluku Islands, while Hector and Susan would return to England with their cargoes. The ships departed on 16 January, and just under a month later on 10 February made anchor off Ambon Island; having lost a number of men to flux during their journey from Java. Here they gained permission from the Portuguese commander to trade on the island. Soon after their arrival however, a Dutch fleet arrived and took the fort by force. As a result of this, the natives refused to trade with the English company until permission had been granted by the Dutch. Middleton was now troubled: the Dutch were cutting off his opportunities to trade. In addition to Ambon Island, they had also beaten the English to the Banda Islands, where they were offering the same commodities as Red Dragon and Ascension had to offer. In view of this, Middleton declared that the only way they could acquire the necessary quantity of goods was for the two vessels to split up, with Red Dragon doing her best to go to the Maluku Islands, while Ascension made for the isles of Banda. The decision was not well received among the crews of the two ships, due to the weakness they were suffering from due to dysentery, and the fact that travelling to the Maluku Islands would mean sailing against both wind and current. Despite these issues, the plan was carried out, Red Dragon sailing for a month before sighting the Maluku Islands.

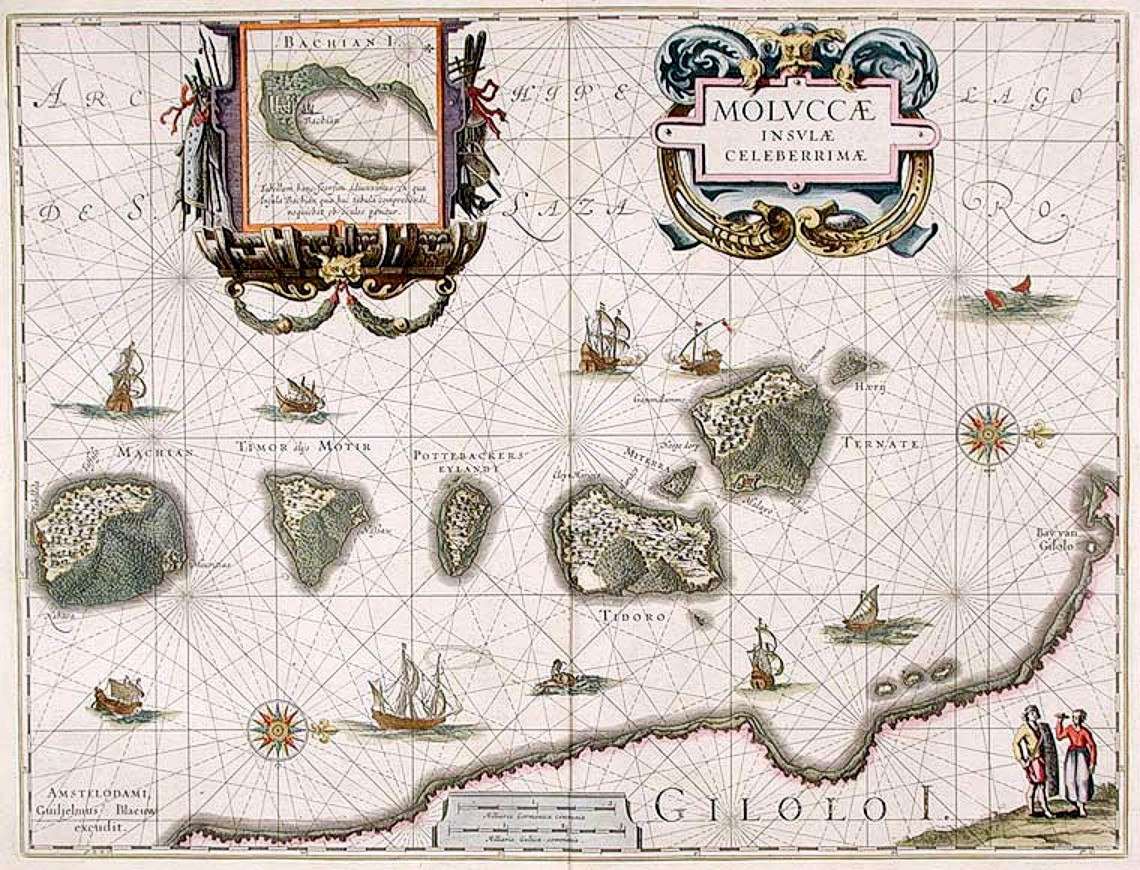
"Moluccæ Insulæ Celeberrimæ", a map by Willem Blaeu first published in 1630 of the Maluku Islands.

The company purchased fresh supplies from the people of Maquian, but the natives refused to trade or sell any cloves without permission from the King of Ternate. Duly, Red Dragon sailed on towards Tidore and Ternate, more eastward islands. On 22 March, they became involved in a small fracas between Tidore and Ternate. Two Ternate galleys were rowing at best possible speed, hailing the Red Dragon to wait for them, being chased by seven Tidore galleys. Middleton ordered the ship to slow and find out what was going on; they found that the galley contained the King of Ternate and three Dutch merchants. The Dutch pleaded with Middleton to rescue the second vessel, which contained more of their kinsmen who would be killed by the chasing Tidore. Red Dragon fired at the Tidore galleys, but they maintained their course, and once within range, fired their own weapons at the trailing Ternate galley. They then boarded the vessel, killing all but three of the crew, those three having abandoned the vessel and swum to Red Dragon. In the aftermath of the attack, the Ternate King endeavoured to talk Middleton out of trading with their enemies on Tidore, and promoted the idea of setting up a factory on Ternate instead. Middleton was set on travelling to Tidore to trade with the Portuguese, saying that if they would not accept peaceable trade, he would have just cause to join the Dutch in war against them. They arrived at Tidore on 27 March, and the following day met Thomè de Torres, captain of one of the Portuguese galleons. Red Dragon traded successfully and remained at Tidore for the next three weeks, acquiring all but 80 bahars (Note: A bahar is a unit of weight in the trading system equivalent to 662.5 pounds (300.5 kg).) of the cloves on the island. The remaining cloves were unavailable as they belonged to merchants of Malacca.

Accordingly, on 19 April, Red Dragon prepared to depart for Maquian, an island mostly sworn to the King of Ternate, with the exception of the town of Taffasoa, which was sworn to the King of Tidore. Already in possession of a letter from the Ternate king, the Tidore king also wrote a letter asking the town's governor to trade with the English. With a Dutch fleet closing in on the island of Tidore, intending to take the island from the Portuguese, Red Dragon departed two days later, needing to sound her trumpets as she passed the Dutch fleet at around midnight to identify herself, in case the Dutch thought she was an escaping Portuguese galleon. Safely past the Dutch, the ship and her crew arrived at Maquian at seven the following evening. On their arrival, Middleton sent his brother, along with two Ternatans who had remained with the ship, to present the governor with the king's letters. After a public reading of the letter, the governor announced that the cloves on the island were not ripe yet, but that those that were the English could have the next day. When the next day came however, they were told that there were no ripe cloves on the island, and Middleton, suspecting Ternatan duplicity, decided to sail for Taffasoa. The inhabitants there were more forthcoming, and the English managed to acquire an amount of cloves from them before the Ternatans attacked the town. With the town's governor informing them that there were no more cloves to be had, and receiving word from the fort on Tidore that the Dutch had burnt two galleons, Red Dragon returned to Tidore on 3 May.

In addition to the Dutch fleet, the King of Ternate and all his caracoas were there, as part of the attack on their enemies. Red Dragon received a cold reception from the Dutch, who claimed that a Guzerat had told them that they had assisted the Portuguese during the last battle, a claim the English vehemently denied. The Dutch then described the battle ensuing, and their plans to attack the fort on the next day. That evening Captain de Torres came aboard and told Middleton that they (the Portuguese) were sure of victory against the Dutch, and would trade any remaining cloves with the English. At around one in the afternoon on 7 May, the Dutch and Ternate attacked, firing all their ordnance at the fort. During particularly heavy fire, the attacking forces landed men on the island, a little north of the town, who entrenched themselves there for the night. The attack continued the next morning, and the landed men were now within a mile of the fort and set up a large piece of ordnance to further bombard the fort. The morning of 9 May, the attack began before sunrise, and catching the Portuguese unaware, the Dutch and Ternate scaled the walls and raised their colours in the fort. During the ensuing battle, the Portuguese and Tidorean forces got the upper hand and drove their enemies from the fort, forcing them to drop their weapons and retreat into the sea. Just as the battle seemed won, the fort exploded, and the combined Dutch and Ternatan forces rallied. The Portuguese retreated once more, sacking the town as they did so, burning the factory with the cloves and leaving nothing of worth.

=== East India Company, Third Voyage (1607–10) ===
On 12 March 1607, Red Dragon, along with Consent and Hector were ordered to travel to Java to maintain trading relationships, and to establish new relationships with India and Aden. William Keeling had command of the fleet, and took Red Dragon as his flagship, sailing with William Hawkins in command of the Hector and David Middleton in command of the Consent, a 105-ton pinnace. Shortly after leaving Tilbury, the ships were separated by storms. Consent then made a rapid trip to the Maluku Islands, while the other two ships had a much slower journey. According to surviving transcripts of Keeling, they performed Hamlet twice and Richard II once during their outward journey. They failed to reach Aden, and according to Keeling's Oxford Dictionary of National Biography entry, "the crew of the Dragon frustrated Keeling's plan to sail to the [Maluku Islands]." Journals from the voyage exist, that of John Hearne and William Finch is held in the British Library, while that of Keeling has been lost, but extracts have been variously published.

=== East India Company, Tenth Voyage (1612–14) ===
Under the command of Thomas Best, Red Dragon took part in the tenth voyage of the East India Company, securing trading rights for the company at Surat in September 1612, and two months later engaging a Portuguese fleet and driving them from the Gulf of Cambay at the Battle of Swally. Hosiander (or Osiander) assisted Red Dragon in defeating the fleet, which consisted of some 30 vessels. (Note: Hosiander, of 213 tons (bm), had been launched at Blackwall in 1611, and served the Company until 1616.)

By January of the following year, Best had set up a factory at Surat and extended trade to Ahmedabad, Burhanpur and Agra.

=== East India Company, Voyage (1615–17) ===
Red Dragon was again commanded by William Keeling during a voyage that also included Lyon, Peppercorn, and Expedition which sailed from Tilbury in February 1615. Keeling had been asked by the East India Company to restructure their Asian trading links. His wife was pregnant at the time, and Keeling tried to smuggle her aboard the Red Dragon, but was not allowed. He put her ashore after being threatened with dismissal, and the fleet left on 23 February. During the voyage, Keeling set up a factory in Sumatra, and was considered to have worked hard. However, he convinced his bosses to allow him to return home to his wife after he suffered ill health, returning in May 1617.

=== End (1622) ===
In October 1619, a Dutch fleet commanded by Willem Jansz attacked the Red Dragon, commanded by Robert Bonner, and three other ships, Expedition, Bear and Rose, all loaded with pepper, near Tecu on the west coast of Sumatra. After a battle all four ships were captured. Captain Bonner was mortally wounded and died on 9 October. Around 300 Englishmen were put on shore and at their request were given back the Rose with food and water. Red Dragon and the other two ships were taken to Batavia (then still called Jacatra). Shortly afterwards the Anglo-Dutch treaty of cooperation took effect in Asia and the Red Dragon and some other captured ships were returned to the English in Bantam, but they refused, being short of sailors to man them. The Red Dragon was later used in the Dutch conquest of the Banda Islands in 1621. In March 1622 Jan Pieterszoon Coen reported that the Red Dragon was worn out and no longer fit to be sailed. It was abandoned on the shore near Batavia.

== Ambiguity ==
Records of the voyages of the East India Company, including those made at the time, often refer to Red Dragon simply as Dragon, familiarity resulting in the shortened title. This however can make tracing the history of the vessel more difficult. Although Sainsbury and Boulger both record the sinking of the vessel in 1619, a later reference is made to a ship named Dragon, commanded by John Weddell in 1637–38. In Jean Sutton's Lords of the East; The East India Company and Its Ships, no fewer than four ships named Dragon are listed, and none named Red Dragon. The first of these, listed as Dragon, 600 tons, six voyages, period of service 1601–18 is almost undoubtedly Red Dragon. The next East India Company ship chronologically is not until 1658, a vessel that undertook only one voyage. That leaves the ship John Weddell commanded in 1637–1638 unaccounted for.
