= Suvali Beach =

Beach in Surat, India

- Swally Beach
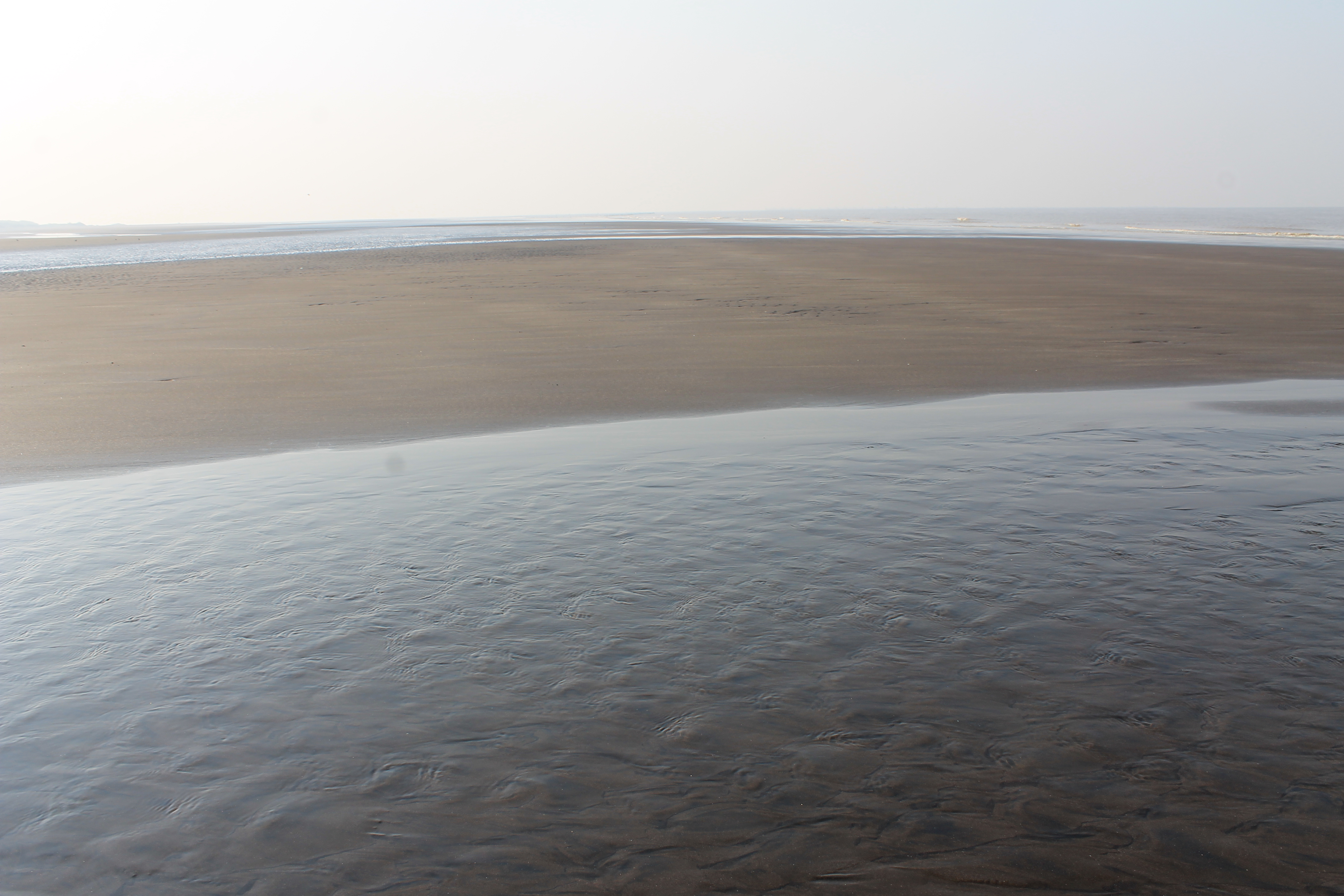
- Suvali Beach, Surat
- Interactive map of Suvali Beach
- Type: Semi-Urban, Sandy beach
- Location: Konkan coast, Arabian Sea, Village of Suvali, Surat, Gujarat
- Nearest city: Surat, India
- Coordinates: 21°09′43.4″N 72°38′28″E
- Operator: Surat Municipal Corporation

Suvali Beach was previously known as Suwally, Swally (anglicised version of Suvali), Swalley-Road, or Swally Beach. Suvali Beach is an urban beach along the Arabian Sea situated near the village of Suvali in the Hazira suburb of Surat in Gujarat State, India. The black sand beach lies 25 kilometres (16 mi) from the centre of Surat and is the cleanest beach in India.

== History ==
Suvali Beach was the gateway from where the East India Company made inroads into India. In 1612, Captain Thomas Best encountered and defeated the Portuguese at the Battle of Swally. Suvali Beach is also known as the birthplace of the modern Indian Navy.

== See also ==
- List of tourist attractions in Surat
