= Battle of Swally =

Part of Portuguese battles in the Indian Ocean (1612)

- Part of Portuguese battles in the Indian Ocean
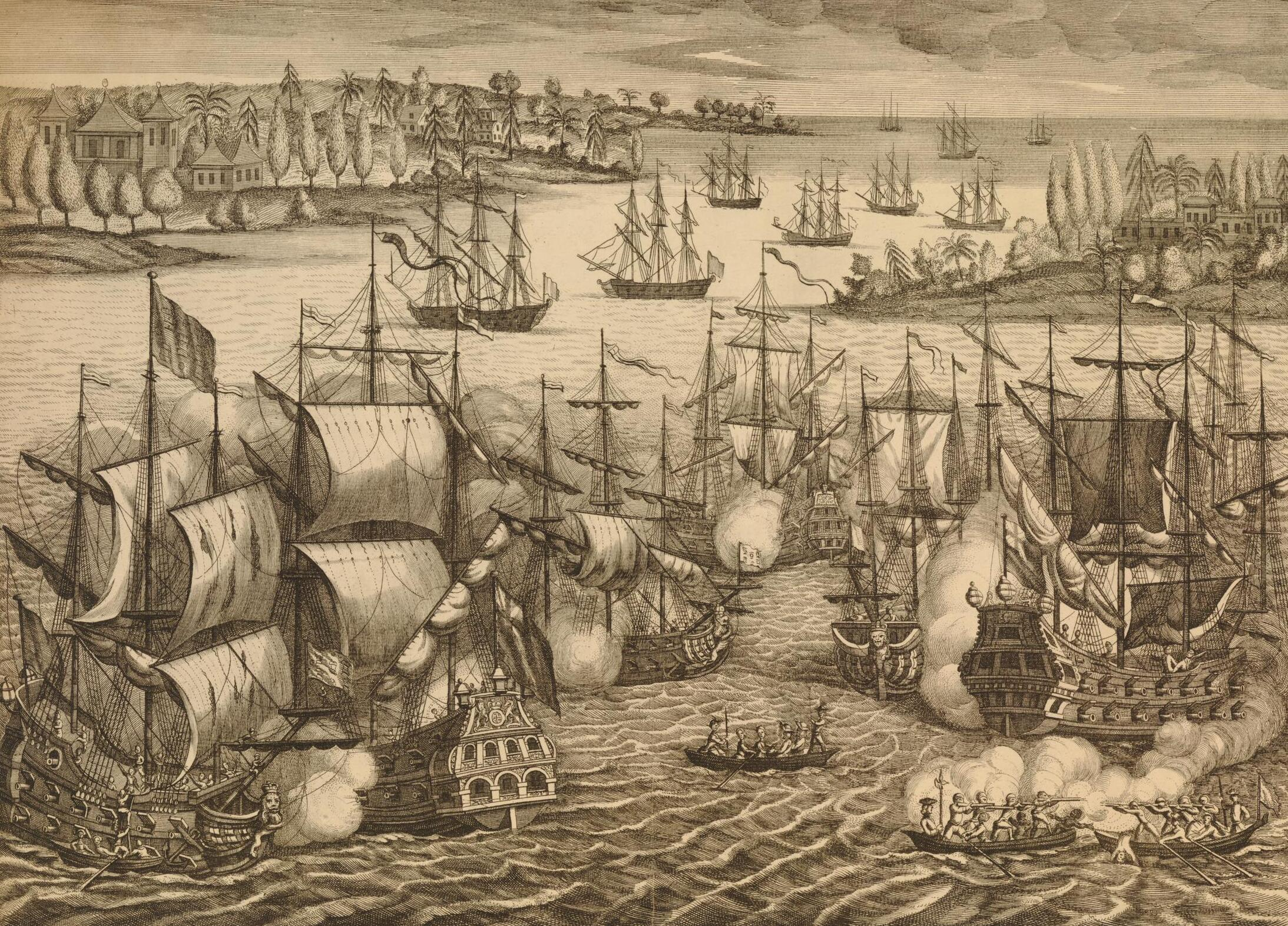
- 1738–1739 engraving of the battle by John Carwitham
Date	29–30 November 1612 (N.S.); 9–10 December 1612 (O.S.)
Location	Off Suvali, Indian Ocean 21°10′N 72°37′E
Result	English victory

Belligerents
English East India Company	Portugal

Commanders and leaders
Thomas Best	Nuno da Cunha

Strength
4 galleons	4 galleons 26 barks

Casualties and losses
Unknown killed and wounded	Unknown killed and wounded 3 galleons beached 1 bark destroyed

The naval Battle of Swally, also known as Battle of Suvali, took place on 29–30 November 1612 off the coast of Suvali (anglicised to Swally) a village near the Surat city (now in Gujarat, India) and was a victory for four English East India Company galleons over four Portuguese galleons and 26 barks (rowing vessels with no armament).

== Background ==
This battle was the result of the Portuguese monopoly over trade with India in the late-15th and 16th centuries. Two English ventures, The Company of Merchant Adventurers (established 1551) which became the Muscovy Company in 1555, and the English East India Company also known as "John Company" (established 1600), were desperately attempting to find routes to the East Indies and the spice trade.

=== Tenth voyage ===
The initial voyages of the English East India Company were not necessarily to India. Each voyage was a venture in itself, separately funded by issuance of subscription stock. An eighth voyage was led in 1611 by Captain John Saris to Japan. The ninth voyage (February 1612 – August 1615) was to India and Sumatra.

The tenth voyage (1612–1614) on behalf of the English East India Company was led by Captain Thomas Best. It set out from Gravesend on 1 February 1612 passing via the present day Trinidad, then Daman on 3 September 1612 eventually reaching Surat on 5 September 1612. Surat was the principal port for the Mughals, and was then situated at the mouth of the river Tapti.

== Battle ==
Coincidentally, on 13 September 1612 a squadron of 16 Portuguese barks sailed into Surat. On 22 September 1612 Captain Best decided to send an emissary to the Emperor asking for permission to trade and settle a factory at Surat. If refused he planned to quit the country. This may have been partly because King James I had extended the company's charter in 1609 on the basis that it would be cancelled if no profitable ventures were concluded within three years.

On 30 September 1612 Captain Best got news that two of his men, Canning (the purser) and William Chambers were arrested while on shore. Fearing the worst, Captain Best detained a ship belonging to the Governor of Gujarat and offered to release it in exchange for his men.

On 10 October Captain Best and his ships sailed to Suvali, a small town about 12 miles (19 km) North of Surat. This may have been because the Governor (Sardar Khan?) was battling a Rajput rebellion at a fort situated in the town. Between 17 and 21 October, amidst negotiations he managed to obtain a treaty with the Governor allowing trading privileges, subject to ratification by the Emperor.

A skirmish took place between the two navies on the 29th without much damage to either side.

At daylight on 30 October, Captain Best in Red Dragon sailed through the four Portuguese galleons led by Captain Major Nuno da Cunha during which three of them ran aground, and was joined by Hosiander on the other side. The Portuguese managed to get the three galleons refloated.

At 9pm that night in an attempt to set the English ships alight, a bark was sent towards them as a fire ship. But the English watch was alert, and the bark was sunk by cannon fire with the loss of eight lives.

A standoff remained until 5 December, when Captain Best sailed for the port of Diu.

== Aftermath ==
This relatively small naval battle is historically important as it marked the beginning of the ascent of the English East India Company's presence in India (though it would only be relevant centuries after).

This battle also convinced the English East India Company to establish a small navy to safeguard their commercial interests from other European powers and also from pirates. This small beginning is regarded as the root of the modern Indian Navy.

On 6 January 1613, Captain Best received a letter from the Emperor ratifying the treaty, which was presented by the Governor. Captain Best then ordered one of his men, Anthony Starkey, on 16 January to leave for England, via land, carrying letters of their success. Starkey later died; it was claimed by the English that he was poisoned by two Jesuit priests.

Captain Best then continued on to Ceylon on 18 January, and then onwards to Sumatra, before returning to England around April 1614 without returning to India.

=== Impact on Mughals ===
This event sufficiently impressed the Subahdar (Governor) of Gujarat, who reported it to the Emperor Jahangir. Thereafter the Emperor was more favourable towards the English than the Portuguese.

=== English factory ===
Swally is the anglicization of Suvali. Suvali port is close to the modern day village of Suvali, located in Surat, India. The port was constructed by the English as they found it protected both from sudden squalls and military attacks. Besides, the English found it convenient to use the place for their early trade with Surat as Swally was navigable in low tides. There were several complications in using the ports at Surat as the French and the Portuguese also operated from there.

R. Sengupta, the Chief Project Co-ordinator (coastal and marine ecology) of GES advised that, "The port was also better than those located in the mouth of river Tapti. The English did not allow anyone to use the port at Swally and used to charge duty for permission to do so."

== Ships involved ==
=== English East India Company ===
(Most references to this battle mention only the first 2 ships. James and Solomon were also part of the eighth voyage)

- Red Dragon (1595)
- Hosiander
- James
- Solomon

=== Portugal ===
- 4 galleons
- 26 oared barks

== See also ==
- Battle of Colachel
- Battle of Diu
