= James Lancaster =

English privateer (1554–1618)

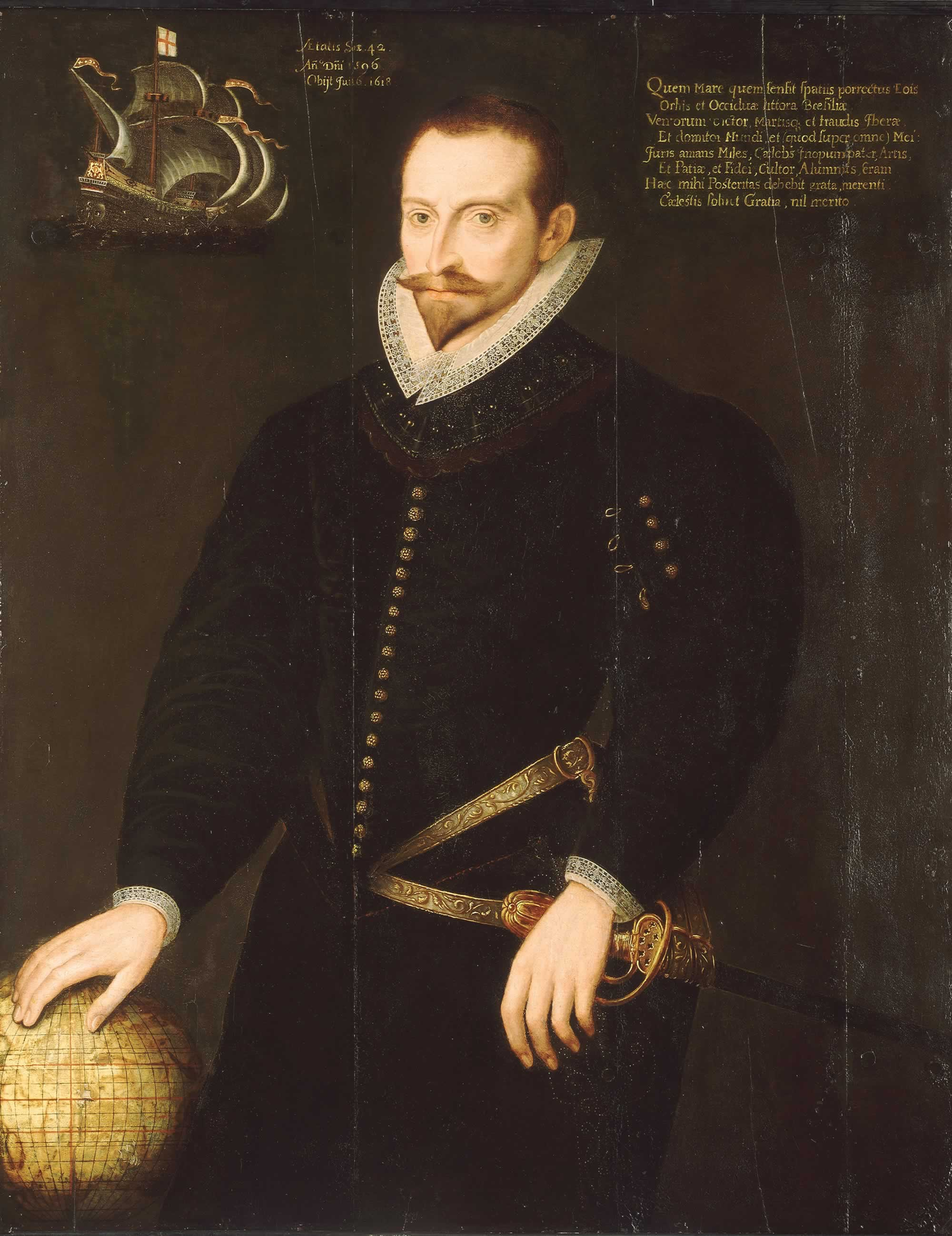
1596 portrait of Lancaster

Sir James Lancaster (c. 1554 – 6 June 1618) was an English privateer and trader of the Elizabethan era.

== Life and work ==
Lancaster came from Basingstoke in Hampshire.

Lancaster was brought up in Portugal as a merchant and soldier, but returned to England in 1587. He thereafter became a trusted employee of the London merchant Thomas Cordell, commanding his merchant ship ‘Edward Bonaventure’ in the fleet against the Spanish Armada in 1588, serving under Sir Francis Drake.

=== East India activities ===
On 10 April 1591 Lancaster started from Torbay in Devon, with George Raymond and Samuel Foxcroft, on his major voyage to the East Indies; this fleet of three ships (Penelope, Marchant Royal and Edward Bonaventure) was the earliest of the English overseas Indian expeditions. They reached Table Bay on 1 August 1591.

Losing one ship off Cape Correntes on 12 September, the squadron rested and refitted at Zanzibar (February 1592), rounded Cape Comorin the following May, and reached the Malay Peninsula having arrived at Penang in June, at least two centuries before the British Empire would gain a foothold in the area. Here Lancaster remained on the island until September of the same year. He then made a trip to the mainland, making the first British encounter with the native Orang Asli.

After a later crossing to Ceylon, the crews insisted on returning home. The return voyage was disastrous, with only twenty-five officers and men surviving to reach England in May 1594. Lancaster himself reached Rye on 24 May 1594. His Indian voyage, like Ralph Fitch's overland explorations and trading, was an important factor in the foundation of the East India Company. In the same year he led a privateering expedition against Pernambuco and Recife in Brazil, aimed at seizing the cargo of a storm-damaged Portuguese carrack which had put in there on its way back from India. Unlike the East Indies voyage, this was (according to Hakluyt's account) highly professional in its conduct and very successful; after picking up a chance-met separate squadron under Captain Henry Middleton, he led an assault landing, seized the town and (with the assistance of a flotilla of Dutch traders who also threw in their lot with him) held it for several weeks and embarked the carrack's cargo along with local produce such as Brazil-wood (the source of a valuable red dye used in the woollen textile industry).

In 1600 he was given command of the East India Company first voyage (which sailed from Torbay on 22 April, 1601); his vessel was the Red Dragon. He was also accredited as Queen Elizabeth's special envoy to various Eastern potentates. Going by the Cape of Good Hope (1 November 1601) Lancaster visited the Nicobars (from 9 April 1602), Aceh and other parts of Sumatra (from 5 June 1602), and Bantam in Java. An alliance was established with Aceh, the first English East India Company factory established at Bantam and a commercial mission dispatched to the Moluccas. Lancaster also seized a large Portuguese galleon and looted it. The return voyage from 20 February to 11 September 1603 was speedy and prosperous, and Lancaster (whose success both in trade and diplomacy had been brilliant) was rewarded with a knighthood from the newly crowned James I in October 1603.

Lancaster continued to be one of the chief directors of the East India Company until his death in June 1618. Most of the voyages of the early Stuart period both to India and in search of the Northwest Passage were undertaken under his sponsorship and direction. In July 1616, Lancaster Sound, the entrance to the Northwest Passage, on the north-west side of Baffin Bay (74° N.), was named by William Baffin after Sir James.

=== Will ===
His will (dated 18 April 1618) established two charitable trusts administered by the Skinners' Company. One was for the benefit of officials and poor people in Basingstoke, and was subsequently transferred by court order to Basingstoke Corporation in 1717. The other was for poor divinity students at Oxford and Cambridge, to whom the Skinners' Company still provides grants today.

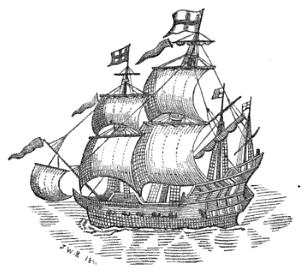
The Red Dragon

== Scurvy ==
At some point in his travels, Lancaster noted the efficacy of fresh fruit as a preventative for scurvy.

In 1601 Lancaster performed an experimental study of the antiscorbutic effects of lemon juice. His fleet of four ships departed Torbay in southwest England on 21 April 1601, and scurvy began appearing in three of the ships by 1 August (4 months after sailing). By the time of arrival, 9 September, at Table Bay in southern Africa, the three ships were so devastated by scurvy that the men of Lancaster's ship, Red Dragon, had to assist the rest of the fleet into the harbor. Lancaster's men remained in better health than the men on the other ships because every morning he gave them three spoonfuls of bottled lemon juice that he had taken to sea. Lancaster would spend much of his time in Madagascar, where he would retrieve more lemon juice, and other citrus to treat his men.

The Admiralty received Lancaster's report. In 1795 – nearly 200 years later and after countless, unnecessary deaths – the Admiralty finally mandated lemon juice for all sailors.
