= Battle of San Juan (1598) =

English victory over Spain in Puerto Rico

- Part of the Anglo-Spanish War (1585–1604)
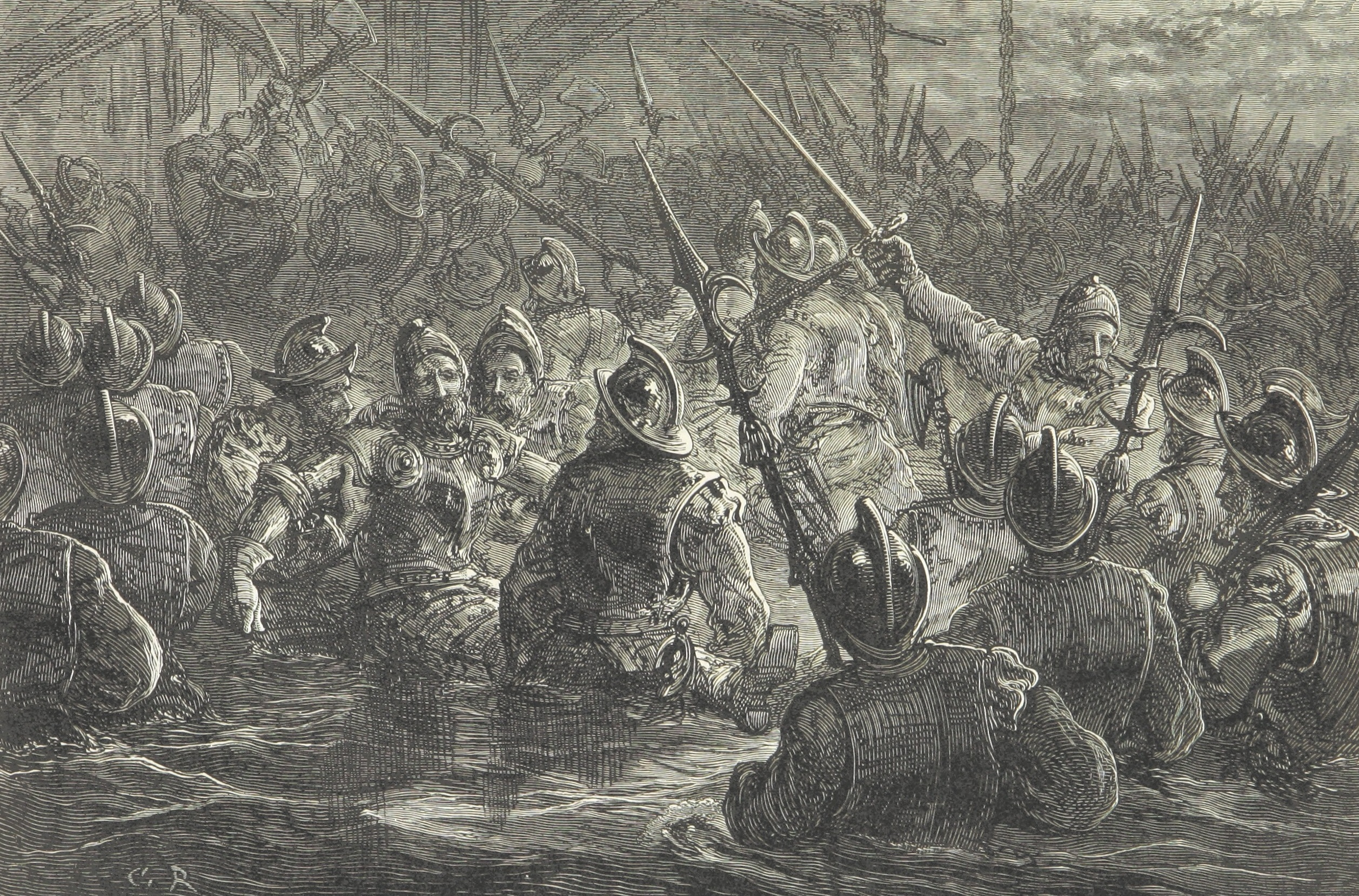
- British illustration of the battle
Date	June 15–30, 1598
Location	Castillo San Felipe del Morro (present-day Puerto Rico)
Result	English victory

Belligerents
Spain: (Spain) Puerto Rico	(Kingdom of England) England

Commanders and leaders
Antonio de Mosquera	Sir George Clifford

Strength
350 soldiers and militia	20 ships, 1,700 men

Casualties and losses
250 surrendered 50 casualties 2 ships captured	60 killed, 40 other deaths

The Battle of San Juan was a military and naval action on June 15, 1598 when an English force of 20 ships and 1,700 men under Sir George Clifford, Earl of Cumberland, overwhelmed and took the Spanish fortress Castillo San Felipe del Morro and thus took the city of San Juan, Puerto Rico. They were able to hold the castle for 65 days but disease took its toll and the English forces left, but not before sacking and burning San Juan to the ground. This was the only attack that broke through and captured El Morro castle.

== Background ==
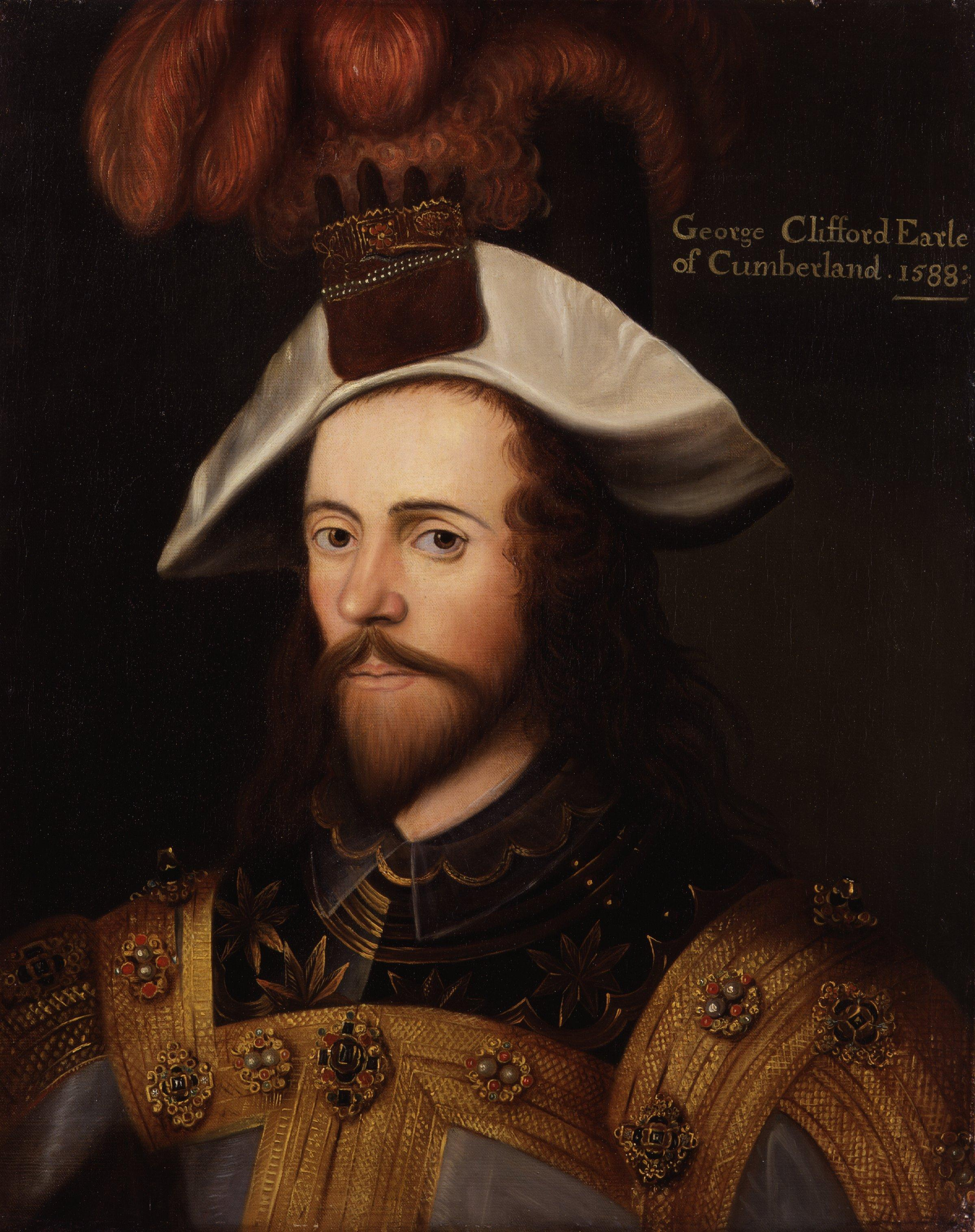
Portrait of Cumberland after Nicholas Hilliard

Sir Francis Drake had been defeated in 1595. The report alarmed Elizabeth I and she wanted to avenge or 'spoil' the defeat. Elizabeth almost immediately sent a new expedition led by George Clifford, 3rd Earl of Cumberland, so that he could seize San Juan and hold as long as possible.

Merely three years after Drake's attack, Cumberland arrived off Dominica with his 600-ton flagship Malice Scourge captained by John Watts, plus the 400-ton vice-flagships Merchant Royal of Sir John Berkeley and Ascension, the 400-ton merchantman Alcedo, and Prosperous, 300-ton Centurion of Henry Palmer, Consent, and Sampson of Henry Clifford; 250-ton galleon Constance of Hercules Fulham; 210-ton Guyana, 200-ton Margaret and John; 190-ton Royal Defence; 120-ton Affection of William Fleming, and Anthony 80-ton Pegasus the frigate Discovery, the pinnace Scout, the bark Ley; plus two unnamed barks. In total the fleet consisted of 1,700 men and twenty ships. After refreshing his fleet for nearly a week, the Earl transferred to the Virgin Islands on 11 June and celebrated a final muster three days later before laying in a course for San Juan.

== Battle ==
On the morning of 16 June, Cumberland disembarked 700 men at Cangrejos Bay 12 mi (20 km) east of San Juan, then marched until nightfall. However 1 mi (1,600 m) short of the city he and his men came up to a bridge known as San Antonio, the only land access to the San Juan islet. This was held by around 100 Spanish soldiers. They managed to repel the English assault, inflicting forty casualties on them, while the Earl of Cumberland himself almost drowned trying to cross the San Antonio channel. The Spaniards suffered only four casualties. The next morning, the English used their boats to outflank the Spanish position, disembarking at Escambrón Point while bombarding Boquerón Redoubt (called Red Fort by the English). The fort was bombarded into submission and the guns silenced with ease as the English deliberately grounded one of their ships in front of the fort which enabled point blank precision firing; by the evening most of the defenders had retreated. The English took possession of the area and consolidated while the rest of the force arrived; two Spanish vessels found were captured.

On 18 June Cumberland with his forces advanced and then swept into San Juan's streets meeting little resistance; he found that some of the citizenry had already fled. The government officials and other residents had taken refuge in El Morro and 250 Spanish soldiers were ensconced within the Morro Citadel. Soon after the town had been occupied, the English had artillery ferried ashore from their fleet and a formal siege was instituted. Two days later the siege was under way and El Morro was bombarded from both land and sea while in the meantime Cumberland set about sacking the town. Knowing that the Spanish were short of supplies, the English preferred to lay siege to the castle of El Morro rather than destroy it. After nearly 15 days huddled inside El Morro, short of food and ammunition and being constantly bombarded, the Spanish governor Antonio Mosquera requested terms on 30 June for a surrender. Cumberland refused this request and set his own terms for the Spanish surrender, which Mosquera eventually agreed to. He and his followers were repatriated to Cartagena several weeks later.

== Aftermath ==
The victory had cost Cumberland nearly 60 casualties; however, the same dysentery that had crippled many of the Spanish had then spread to Cumberland's men, incapacitating nearly 600–700 of them as well, which included forty deaths. With barely enough troops to crew his ships, much less maintain control of the prize he had seized from Spain, Cumberland finally decided to leave the island. Before he left however he ordered the sacking of San Juan and then ordered the destruction of the crops. His troops took the organ and bells from the local cathedral and took booty ranging from 2,000 slaves to a marble windowsill that caught the eye of Cumberland. Cumberland sailed for England with some ships on 14 August, then on 23 September Berkeley followed with his main body along with around 70 artillery pieces from the fort. Clifford on his return to England was proclaimed as a hero of sorts and as a consequence with his limited booty was well rewarded for his efforts including a patent from the Queen.

In the wake of the attack, Spain sent more soldiers, supplies, and weapons to rebuild the city and its defenses. From 1601 to 1609, the reconstruction of El Morro saw its toppled hornwork strengthened with the foundations still used today. The Spanish on San Juan built up its defences and was next attacked by the Dutch in 1625. This time however the Spaniards were better prepared and were able to defeat the Dutch.

== See also ==
- Military history of Puerto Rico
