= William Keeling =

British sea captain (1577–1619)

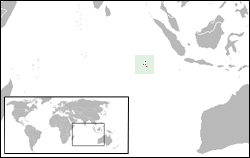
Location of Cocos (Keeling) Islands at 12°07′S 96°54′E in the Indian Ocean.

Captain William Keeling (1577 – 19 September 1619), of the East India Company, was an English sea captain.

== Career ==
He commanded the Susanna on the second East India Company voyage in 1604. During this voyage his crew was reduced to fourteen men and one of the ships vanished. On the third voyage he commanded the Red Dragon and the Hector in 1607. During this voyage he met with an ambassador from the Siamese Ayutthaya Kingdom in 1608 at Bantam at the west end of Java. He discovered the Cocos (Keeling) Islands in 1609 as he was going home from Banda to England.

Keeling's diary as an East Indian Company captain for 1615 survives. On his return to England, King James I appointed Keeling a Groom of the Chamber, and about 1618 he was named Captain of Cowes Castle on the Isle of Wight, where he died in 1620.

== Disputed diary fragment ==
A fragment of one of Keeling's earlier diary survives, in which he allegedly details his crew's shipboard performances of Shakespeare's Hamlet (off the coast of Sierra Leone, 5 September 1607, and at Socotra, 31 March 1608) and of Richard II (Sierra Leone, 30 September 1607). For a time after its discovery, the fragment was suspected of being a forgery, but it subsequently became generally accepted as genuine, though recent scholarship has reverted to the view that it is almost certainly a forgery by John Payne Collier.

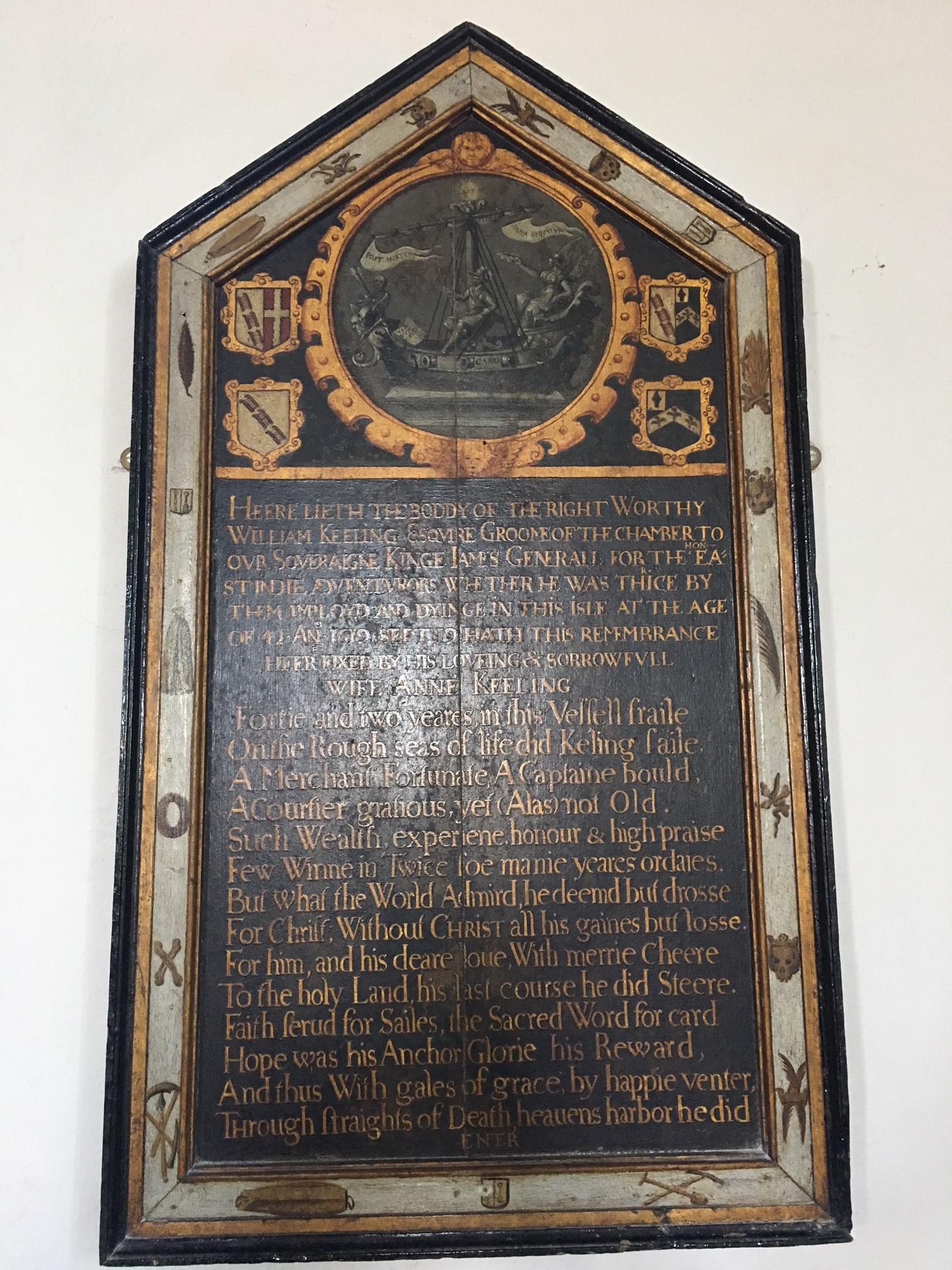
Painted Memorial to William Keeling in St Mary's Church, Carisbrooke, Isle of Wight
