= Escape to Canada =

- Theatrical poster
- Directed by: Albert Nerenberg
- Written by: Albert Nerenberg
- Produced by: Shannon Brown
- Cinematography: Shannon Brown
- Edited by: Wolfe Blackburn
- Music by: Steve Barden
- Production companies: Elevator Films, Documentary Channel, Canal D, National Film Board of Canada
- Distributed by: National Film Board of Canada
- Release date: 19 September 2005 (FIFM)
- Running time: 81 minutes
- Country: Canada
- Language: English
- Budget: C$170,000

Escape to Canada (U.S.: Land of the Freer) is a 2005 Canadian satirical documentary film written and directed by Albert Nerenberg, with cinematography by producer Shannon Brown, the debut feature of their production company, Elevator Films, commissioned by the Documentary Channel, Canal D, and the National Film Board of Canada. The film examines the results of Canada's relaxing of its marijuana laws at the same time that same-sex marriage became legal, along with Canada's abstention from the U.S.-led invasion of Iraq having made the country a perceived haven for progressive Americans. The documentary's events begin in the summer of 2003 when both same-sex marriage and marijuana were legalized (temporarily, in the case of the latter). The film underscores the contrast between the liberal movement in Canada and the more conservative attitude in the U.S., the premise being that "liberal attitudes beget liberal laws", and that "Canada, and not the U.S., is North America's pre-eminent freedom-loving country."

== Synopsis ==
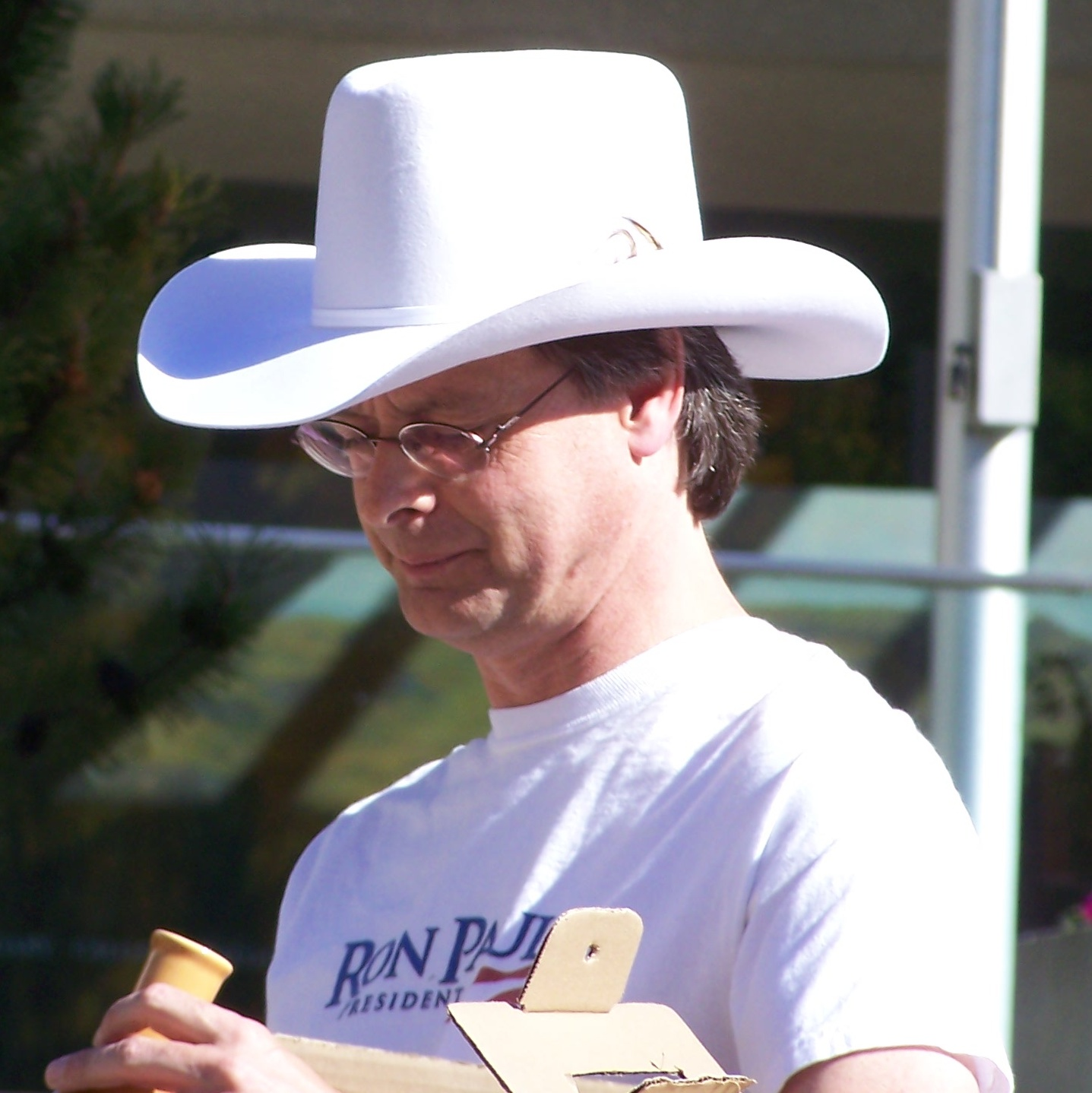
Marc Emery

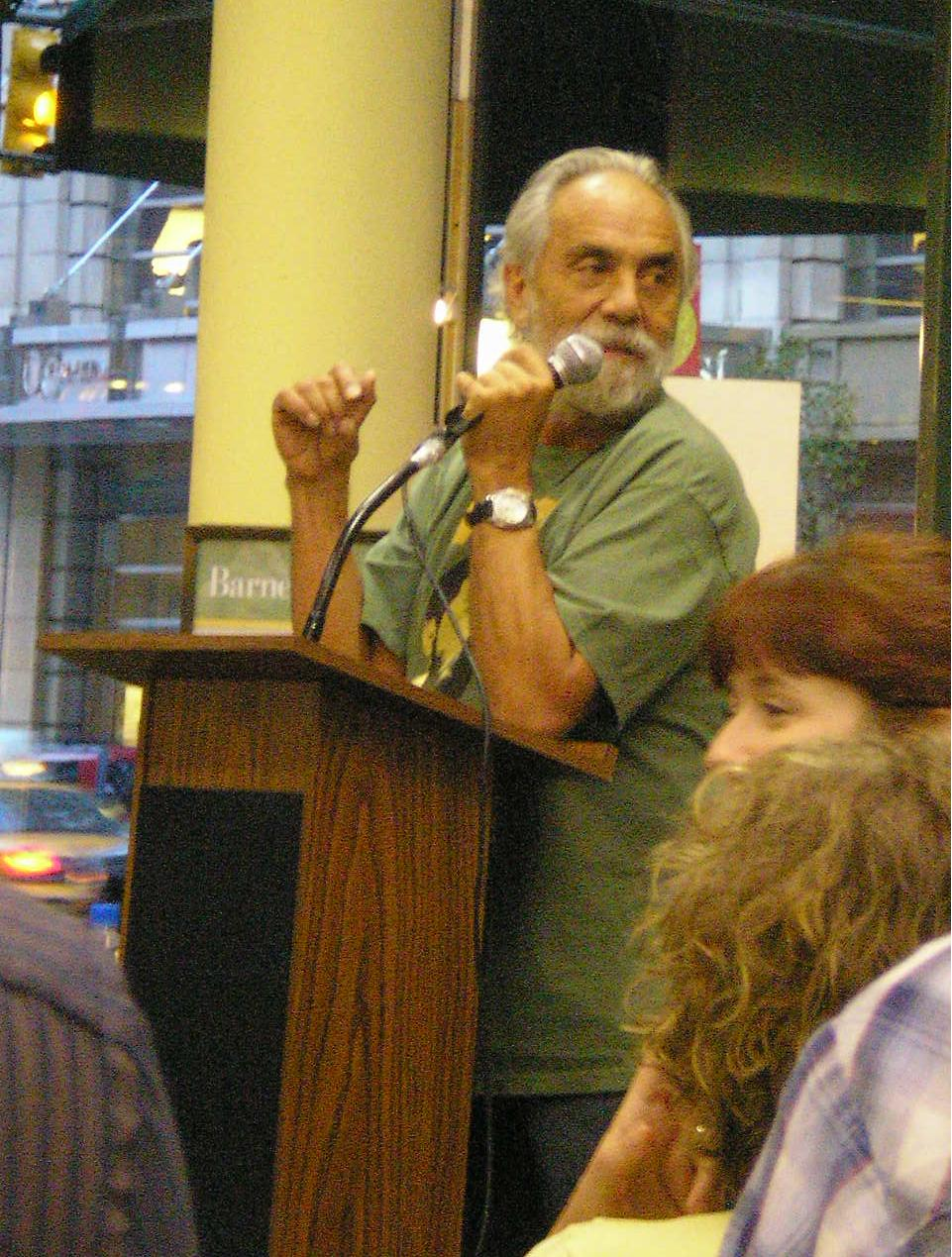
Tommy Chong

A voyage across Canada's "freedom adventure". The film follows the "Summer of Legalization" when same-sex marriage and "marijuana cafés" spread across the country. The film examines a "freedom boom": a stream of "escaping" AWOL American soldiers straight out of Iraq, followed by "reefer refugees", pot tourists and American same-sex couples. But within months, Canada re-criminalizes cannabis and there's a new campaign to turn back gay marriage.

The film features interviews with, among others, then Vancouver mayor (now Senator) Larry Campbell, Tommy Chong, Marc Emery, seen travelling the country and smoking marijuana in front of police stations, ex-U.S. soldier Brandon Hughey, trying to avoid serving in the Iraq War, and the couple known as the Michaels, whose impromptu wedding started a wave of gay marriages, and their lawyer Martha McCarthy.

== Production ==
Albert Nerenberg felt that the two legal decisions concerning same-sex marriage and marijuana were made on the same day in 2003 was "very significant", as "something revealing about the direction of Canada as a country." (Note: ""On June 10, 2003, in two courtrooms mere blocks away from one another in downtown Toronto, two judges passed decisions—one legalizing same-sex marriage in Ontario, the other suspending (however temporarily) the prohibition of marijuana.") Then, when the government made it clear that Canada would not be participating in "the Iraq adventure, I realized we were having our very own summer of love." (Note: In Nerenberg's opinion, the Canadian system, "for all its flaws, is ultimately a rational one", and he believes that "the new vanguard of freedom is the issue of personal freedom", that the issues have become "patriotic" and "fused with our emerging national identity". Nerenberg even believes that there is an anti-American element in it, which he sees in himself: "I may not even like marijuana personally—but the fact that Americans are so against marijuana makes me love it more.")

Elevator Films was founded as a new branch of Toronto production company Trailervision, which had co-produced Nerenberg and Shannon's previous film, Stupidity. The film was originally conceived as a short film or TV hour, but grew to feature-length after attracting the attention of the National Film Board's Silva Basmajian. It began shooting on a $170,000 budget.

== Release and reception ==
Escape to Canada had its world premiere at the New Montreal FilmFest on 19 September 2005. It went on to be screened shortly thereafter in Alberta, at the 2005 Calgary International Film Festival on 30 September and 1 October, and at the Edmonton International Film Festival on 8 October. It played at the Whistler Film Festival on 3 December.

The film was more generally released in Québec cinemas for the first time on 17 February 2006, and in Ontario in March 2006, including at the Kingston Canadian Film Festival on 12 March. In Hamilton and elsewhere, a few screenings were shut down "due to a fog of pot smoke in the air".

Escape to Canada played on 28 May 2006 as the closing night feature at the DOXA Documentary Film Festival in Vancouver.

=== Critical response ===
Matt McMillan praises the film overall, appreciating its "wry wit and AD/HD editing velocity", calling Nerenberg's style "one of the most distinctive" in Canadian documentaries. Dorothy Woodend compares Escape to Canada favourably to Nerenberg's last film, Stupidity, saying it "packs a similar punch", and that the film is "jammed with both ephemera and critical ideas ... but one of the things that stands out most clearly is the high cost of courage." Dominic Bouchard, while acknowledging the limitations of the film's binary oppositions, appreciated its caustic humour, comparing it favourably to the work of Michael Moore, as does Louis Proyect, specifically, to Sicko.

Christopher Long calls the documentary "both a sincere ode and a tongue-in-cheek look" at Canada, calling it "no masterpiece", noting "quite a bit of redundancy in the film", and that it "briefly touches on the subject of American soldiers seeking asylum in Canada as they refuse to fight in Iraq, but the thread receives scant attention compared to the gay marriage and pot themes." Eddie Cockerell, writing for Variety, found the film's technique "OK", noted the "variety of home-grown rock tunes", but felt the film was "marred by rather too many aerial shots of forests and waterfalls used to segue between subjects." Teacher-librarian Joanne Peters agreed, assigning the film 2 stars out of 4, recommending it with reservations: "Escape to Canada offers an interesting perspective on the convergence of forces for social change. And, it offers yet another look at how Canadians differ from Americans. At the same time, the movie makes some sweeping generalizations about both nations and certainly could have used better editing", saying aerial shots of wildlife becoming tiresome by third viewing, and even though the interviews lend credibility to the filmmakers' argument, they, too, are repetitive.

Assigning the film 1.5 stars, novelist and critic Kate Taylor finds "this initially amusing" documentary "quickly loses both its smarts and its comedy because Nerenberg has mistaken a topic and an attitude for a theme"; moreover, the film greatly exaggerates Canada's reputation for moral conservatism so that Nerenberg can suggest 2003 was a revolution, "and he never does reveal any evidence of a larger trend"; Taylor argues that if these events "do reflect a liberalization of Canadian society in contrast to the United States, then that is not a revolution but rather an evolution that has a historical and political context far beyond Nerenberg's scope." She also found the film highly repetitive, and offering a degree of detail only Canadians can really appreciate, but who also will recognize that the film lacks any context with which to frame the events it portrays.

Travis Mackenzie Hoover feels the film engages in "smug self-regard" and does not need to be seen by any "marginally well-informed person":

The influx of gay Americans yearning to be freer than in the land of the free is indeed touching, as is the saga of the ludicrous rigmarole pot users must endure once Canada institutes a medical marijuana policy and makes recreational use illegal again. But though the struggle for the spliff is rather interesting, the ultimate purpose of the documentary is to make Canadians feel high and mighty about our perceived superiority. Not only is this untenable when the film turns its attention to American soldiers avoiding the Iraq war (that Afghanistan thing is, apparently, just a hiccup) but it allows people to relax and think that there are no real problems in our country - a self-deluding lie that papers over the real issues that face Canadians.

Nerenberg's own take on whether the film had actually captured something of a Canadian zeitgeist or genuinely presaged anything to come, when asked, was this: "Even if it's just a stab at capturing what's been happening lately, the film shows us in a different light. Among young people, the old self-effacement is starting to wane, and Canadians are starting to be proud of their uniqueness."

=== Home media ===
Escape to Canada was released on both VHS and DVD on 19 June 2007. The disc (by Disinformation Studios) includes 100 minutes of "bonus footage and extended interviews, 20 minutes more than the movie proper," including additional or extended interviews with Tommy Chong, Marc Emery, and Martha McCarthy.

== Marketing and related works ==
Nerenberg was said by Eddie Cockrell to prefer nighttime screenings for Escape to Canada and to have encouraged audiences to "experience his work in something called "Stonervision"."

=== Don't Mind If I Do (unproduced) ===
While still in production, Escape to Canada was reported to have had a spin-off TV hour, Don't Mind If I Do, "about the busloads of gay and lesbian couples heading north to tie the knot," but this does not appear to have come to fruition as a separate project.

=== Why Is It Sexy? ===
Nerenberg and Brown are both named as executive producers of a pilot for the Discovery Channel called Why is it Sexy?, looking at the science of sexual attraction. In October 2004, Unstable Ground confirmed they had done some editing for the pilot. It was broadcast as a TV special on 15 May 2005.
