= Stupidity (disambiguation) =

Stupidity is the property of a person, action or belief instantiated by virtue of having or being indicative of low intelligence or poor learning abilities.

Stupidity may also refer to

- Stupidity (Bad Manners album) (2003)
- Stupidity (Dr. Feelgood album) (1976)
- Stupidity (film), a 2003 Canadian satirical documentary film
- Artificial stupidity
