= Stupidity (film) =

- Directed by: Albert Nerenberg
- Written by: Albert Nerenberg
- Produced by: Shannon Brown
- Narrated by: Fred Napoli, Albert Nerenberg
- Cinematography: Shannon Brown
- Edited by: Max Hummer
- Music by: The Morons
- Production companies: If You're Watching, Documentary Channel, TrailerVision
- Release dates: 1 May 2003 (Hot Docs); 1 March 2004 (U.S.)
- Running time: 61 minutes
- Country: Canada
- Language: English
- Box office: C$29,472 (Canada)

Stupidity is a 2003 Canadian satirical documentary film directed by Albert Nerenberg and produced by Shannon Brown, as the first film commissioned by the Documentary Channel. Nerenberg was also the film's executive producer. The film proposes that willful ignorance (as opposed to what is commonly meant by stupidity, low mental capacity) has increasingly become a strategy for success in the realms of politics and entertainment, that is, the "stupid" things that seemingly smart people do every day. The film questions "why stupidity is such a slippery concept to grasp and why so few people are talking about it." The film features songs by The Arrogant Worms and original music by The Morons.

== Synopsis ==
The film traces the public fascination with perceived stupidity, from I.Q. tests in the early 1900s, to present-day silliness in the form of Jackass and boy bands. Nerenberg compares George W. Bush to Adam Sandler, arguing that the perception that Bush is unintelligent is as mistaken as identifying Sandler with the roles he plays in his films: both are in some sense playing to expectations from their respective audiences: "society prefers people who hide their acumen."

To back up his various theories, Nerenberg employs quotes from Noam Chomsky, American Psychological Association president Dr. Robert J. Sternberg (who wrote Why Smart People Can Be So Stupid), pundit Bill Maher, "who blames it all on youth culture", and former CNN and 20/20 producer Danny Schecter. Others who appear in the film include: John Cleese, Coolio, Drew Curtis, Salma Hayek, David Lawrence, Michael Moore, Geoff Pevere, Adam Sandler, Joel Schumacher, Paul Spence, Steve-O, and Josey Vogels.

== Production ==
=== Inspiration ===
In a podcast interview, Albert Nerenberg told Steve Paulson he was watching a "boring" documentary about intelligence when it occurred to him that stupidity would make a much more interesting film. He also said that the media has been dumbing itself down for a long time, and that he was tired of doing it himself. In his commentary for the director's cut Stupidity DVD, Nerenberg says the work itself began as an investigation of the popularity of the Jackass franchise. Nerenberg has been quoted as saying that he made Stupidity because no one had ever made a documentary about the subject before and that "obviously it's an important issue... while society ostensibly pretends to educate its citizens it appears to make them stupid."

=== Filming ===
Reportedly "made for little money" (Nerenberg's Elevator Films website says it had a "modest TV hour budget"), much of the footage featuring off-the-cuff commentary by celebrities was obtained "by taking advantage of" attendees of the Toronto International Film Festival. Commentary on the DVD indicates that the film was shot using a 1.33:1 ratio, subsequently matted for the feature film to 1.85:1, affecting compositions in some areas.

== Release ==
Stupidity was screened in theatres during the 10th annual Hot Docs Canadian International Documentary Festival in Toronto, at the Bloor Cinema on 1 May 2003 and on 3 May at the Royal Ontario Museum. Its American theatrical premiere took place in San Francisco on 1 March 2004, preceding a "limited run".

The film had its UK premiere at the OxDox Film Festival at Oxford University on 25 and 26 October 2004, accompanied by panel discussions and debates. The goal of the symposium was to raise interest in a larger international conference in 2005.

=== Home media ===
A 77-minute director's cut DVD was released on 16 November 2004, with extended interviews of Jay Teitel, Jim Welles, Bill Maher, Giancarlo Livraghi, Noam Chomsky, Joel Schumacher, and Avital Ronewell, as well as a half-hour interview with director Nerenberg by Christina Pochmursky, commentary by Nerenberg, and an I.Q. test "to see just how stupid you are."

=== Streaming ===
It has been available to stream from SnagFilms since 10 November 2009.

== Reception ==
=== Commercial performance ===
Stupidity was the biggest sellout (two sold-out shows) at the Hot Docs festival, a "runaway hit". According to data from the Motion Picture Theatres Association of Canada, the film was the highest grossing documentary film in the country in 2003, with C$29,472 in box office receipts, more than twice the takings of either of its next three competitors, À hauteur d'homme, Sexe de rue, and La grande traversée, and about three times as much as the next six.

=== Critical response ===
On review aggregating website Rotten Tomatoes, the documentary, as of 2025, has a score of 67% based on six reviews, with an average rating of 6.7/10.

Lynne Fernie said the film "starts out as an entertaining romp through mass culture", quickly becoming "ominous", calling it hilarious, smart and "very scary". David Silverberg calls the film "intelligent", "thoughtful and entertaining", and appreciated its quick-cut editing and "visual playfulness", concluding that the film "attracted attention because it provoked discussion on how we view the reality we take for granted." James Keast says Stupidity accomplishes its goals quite handily: "it's a delightfully engrossing film to watch, because for whatever reason we like it when other people do stupid things", referencing the Darwin Awards, and, "because, for such a moronic topic, it applies some serious intellectual rigour to the subject." Jonathan Curiel calls the film "clever, hilarious and -- in its own stylish way -- ironic." Curiel believes that the film is "balanced", despite Nerenberg's "obvious liberal views", citing his interview of former Bush speechwriter David Frum. Marc Savlov, assigning the film 3 stars out of 5, calls it an "amusing and horrifying documentary", which, were it stripped of Nerenberg's "hyperwit," might have been "too depressing to watch."

Wendy Banks describes the film's "rapid-fire editing" and spoofy, Entertainment Tonight like aesthetic as "more a riff than an argument", and suggests "it raises more questions than it answers", but remains "an intriguing subject, both funny and scary, and Nerenberg attacks it full on with humour and moments of insight." Christopher Null grants the film 3.5/6, saying the film is a frequently fascinating "but sometimes wandering work that provides some insight into the nature of dumbness", but ultimately Nerenberg pads out an already short movie with man-on-the-street interviews "that are really nothing more than thinly veiled attempts to make the average joe look, well, stupid."

Liam Lacey gives the documentary no stars, calling Stupidity "only a moderately stupid film", intentionally, but annoyingly, flippant, as well as "overproduced with gimmicky fast editing and speeded-up action", with needlessly unpleasant imagery, and abounding with wild, "and not very smart, generalizations"; Nerenberg fails to distinguish between "stupid and foolish". Reviewing the film for Variety, Dennis Harvey calls it "thinly amusing" but was otherwise not impressed: "A more deadpan, mock-solemn approach might have lent this concept a veneer of genuine wit", and Nerenberg's "jokey pastiche" is in "exactly the short-attention-span mode he decries in modern media." Reviewing the film for Maclean's, Brian D. Johnson accuses the film of doing exactly what it decries:

Stupidity unfolds as a blitz of titillating images—crazy stunts, streakers, grossout gags, monster trucks, Dubya gaffes—intercut with soundbites by everyone from Rick Mercer to Noam Chomsky. Less documentary than "amusementary", the film is the best evidence for its own message—that dumbing down is a smart strategy. In a culture where reality is faked, and intelligence is the ultimate taboo, Stupidity fits right in.

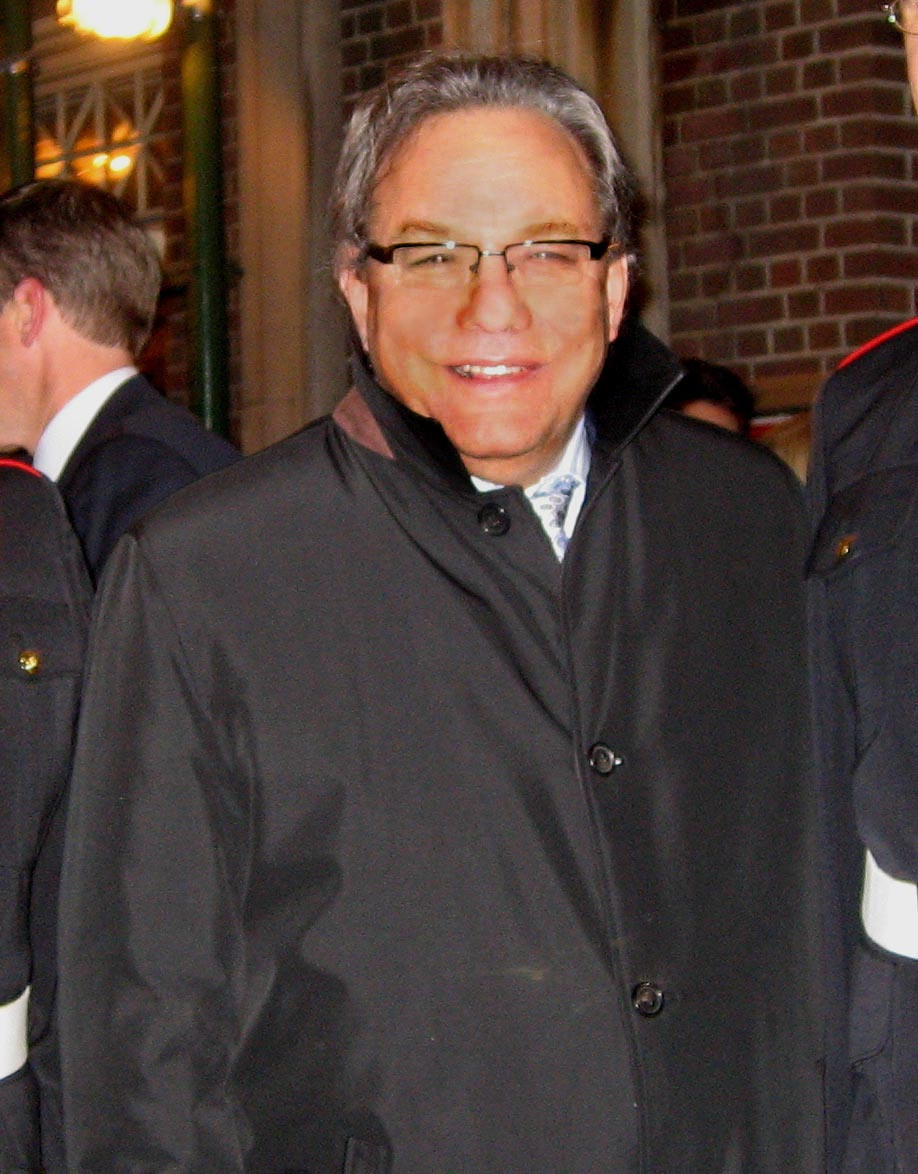
Lewis Black hosted the World Stupidity Awards in 2004 and 2005.

=== Accolade ===
- Best Documentary, Atlantic City Film Festival

== Marketing and related works ==
The Documentary Organization of Canada, which founded the Hot Docs festival, hosted an event to celebrate the premiere of Stupidity at the Schmooze dance club on 1 May 2003.

=== World Stupidity Awards ===
Nerenberg founded the World Stupidity Awards, which took place on 6 June 2003, and were accompanied by a screening of Stupidity. Notable nominees included Muhammad Saeed al-Sahhaf, George W. Bush, Elsie Wayne and Mel Lastman. Comparing them to the Darwin Awards, which celebrate those who have purportedly killed themselves through acts of stupidity, Nerenberg said: "we believe the living stupid are far more influential and demand recognition".

Starting in 2004, the awards were bestowed in Montréal, sponsored by the Just for Laughs festival, and hosted by Lewis Black. The media event introduced the category of Stupidest Statement of the Year and four others added to the original six for a total of eleven categories that year. Black returned to host the show in 2005, when the category of Stupidest Awards Show of the Year was added, and the show itself was declared the winner. The awards were presented again in 2006 and, for the last time, in 2007.

== See also ==
- Assholes: A Theory
