= The Great Adventure =

The Great Adventure can refer to:

== Albums ==
- The Great Adventure (Steven Curtis Chapman album), 1992
- The Great Adventure (The Neal Morse Band album), 2019

== Film and theatre ==
- The Great Adventure (play), "A Play of Fancy in Four Acts", 1913 play by the English author Arnold Bennett
- The Great Adventure (1915 film), British silent comedy based on Arnold Bennett's work, directed by Laurence Trimble#Select filmography
- The Great Adventure (1918 film), American silent comedy-drama
- The Great Adventure (1921 film), American silent comedy based on Arnold Bennett's work
- The Great Adventure (1951 film), British-South African action adventure a/k/a The Adventurers, Fortune in Diamonds or South African Story
- The Great Adventure (1952 film), Czechoslovak biographical adventure; original title Velké dobrodruzství, with Vladimír Brabec#Selected filmography
- The Great Adventure (1953 film), Swedish drama
- The Great Adventure (1974 film), Argentine action comedy
- The Great Adventure (1975 film), Italian adventure starring Jack Palance#Filmography
- The Great Adventure (2003 film), Canadian-French ecological documentary

== Television ==
- The Great Adventure, 24 May 1939 BBC live adaptation of Arnold Bennett's work with Finlay Currie#Complete filmography as Texel
- The Great Adventure, 11 December 1947 BBC live adaptation of Arnold Bennett's work with Finlay Currie#Complete filmography as Texel
- The Great Adventure, 18 January 1956 The United States Steel Hour#Television live adaptation of Arnold Bennett's work
- The Great Adventure, 17 January 1957 ITV Play of the Week live adaptation of Arnold Bennett's work
- The Great Adventure, 25 May 1958 BBC Sunday-Night Theatre live adaptation of Arnold Bennett's work
- The Great Adventure (U.S. TV series), 1963–64 American history anthology series
- "The Great Adventure", 27 October 1985 episode of Australian miniseries Anzacs (TV series)#Episodes
- "The Great Adventure", 8 December 1987 episode of British animated children's series, Henry's Cat#Series 4 (1986–1987)
- The Great Adventure (HK TV series), 2005 Hong Kong drama series

== See also ==
- Great Adventure, American amusement park in New Jersey, a/k/a Six Flags Great Adventure
- The Great Adventuress, 1928 German silent comedy film, original title Die große Abenteuerin
