= You Are What You Act =

2018 Canadian documentary film

- Directed by: Albert Nerenberg
- Written by: Albert Nerenberg
- Produced by: Frédéric Bohbot
- Cinematography: Alexandre Chabot, Daniel Lynn, Kieran Crilly, Bill Stone
- Edited by: Joseph Bohbot
- Music by: Paul Baraka
- Production companies: Bunbury Films, Documentary Channel, Canal D
- Distributed by: Cargo Films & Releasing
- Release date: 1 June 2018 (Illuminate Film Festival)
- Running time: 78 minutes
- Country: Canada
- Language: English

You Are What You Act (French: J'agis, donc je suis) is a 2018 Canadian documentary film written and directed by Albert Nerenberg, and produced by Frédéric Bohbot. Commissioned by the Documentary Channel and Canal D, the film points out how film actors often become their roles and suggests these principles apply to ordinary people in terms of actualizing confidence, heroism, health and even love.

== Synopsis ==
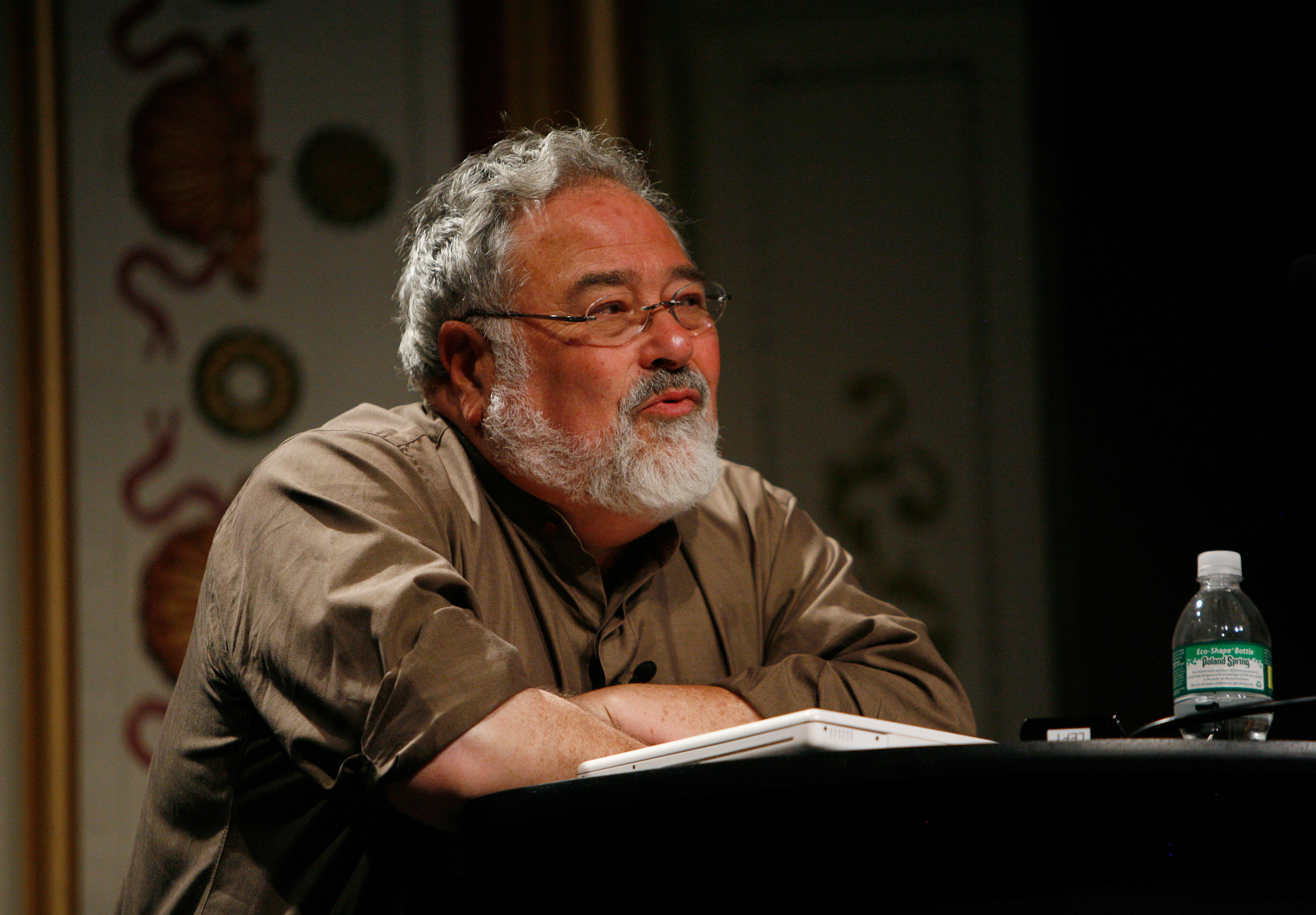
George Lakoff

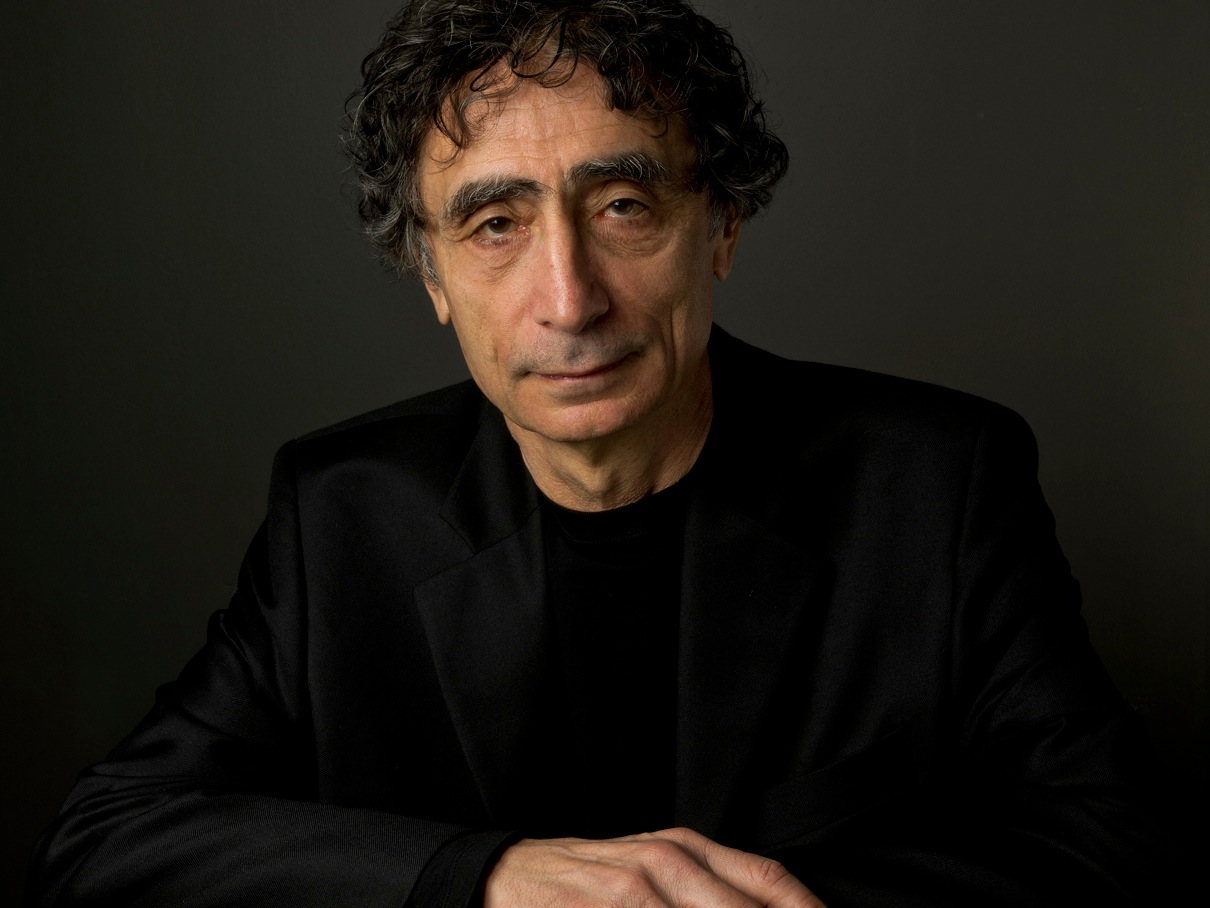
Gabor Maté

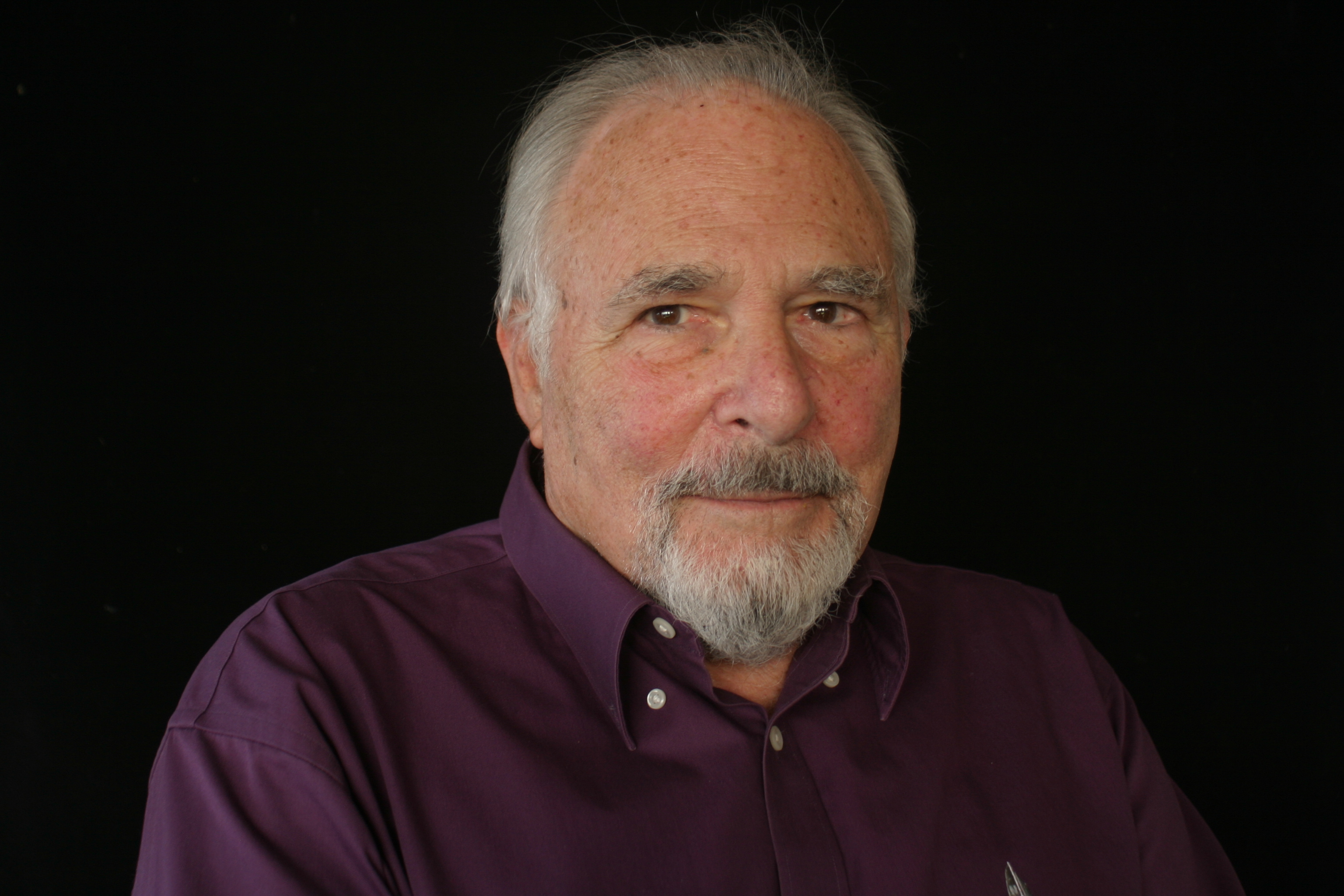
Paul Ekman

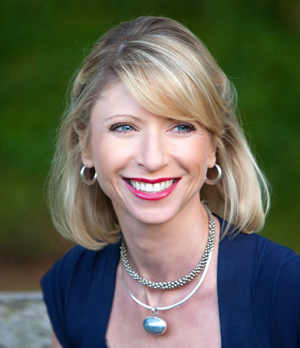
Amy Cuddy

The film explores a new field of science called embodied cognition, with some of the leading researchers in the field including George Lakoff, Gabor Maté, Paul Ekman, Philip Zimbardo, and Harvard psychologist Amy Cuddy.

The shorthand expression, "fake it till you make it", appears to ring true, though it can also backfire (people behaving overconfidently) and it also applies to undesirable outcomes (acting depressed and becoming depressed).

A section of the film explores the "hack for love" as proposed by psychologist Robert Epstein, and features Madan Kataria, the inventor of laughter yoga.

== Production ==
=== Inspiration ===
Nerenberg noticed how many actors had performed acts of heroism, and began wondering if these actors were "practising" courage without realizing it. When he began researching the documentary, he saw there was an even more precise pattern: "Sure, many stars play heroes, but only some perform outstanding heroic acts in public. It was most often actors who do their own stunts, people likely into the physical culture of stunts and action." Nerenberg has a background in acting himself:"I've always thought that, for me, learning acting was a really empowering experience... So I had always been interested in sort of the science of the way acting changes people." Bill Brownstein remarks that Nerenberg first wrote about the idea in his Montreal Gazette column some eight years previously.

=== Financing ===
The film received funding from the Canada Media Fund.

=== Filming ===
Parts of the film were shot in Kingston, Ontario, where Nerenberg lives part-time.

== Release and reception ==
You Are What You Act had its world premiere at the Illuminate Film Festival at the Mary D. Fisher Theatre in Sedona, Arizona on 1 June 2018. The film was selected for the inaugural Knowlton Film Festival in Lac-Brome, Québec and screened on 17 August 2018. The film was screened as part of the 11th Be The Change film series at Collingwood, Ontario, on 21 November 2018, at the Simcoe Street Theatre (where proceeds went to charity). The same month, it was shown at the Hot Docs Ted Rogers Cinema in Toronto on 29 November 2018 and at the Screening Room independent theatre in Kingston, Ontario on 30 November 2018.

Its television broadcast premiere was on 6 January 2019 on the Documentary Channel.

It was screened in Montréal at the Cinéma du Parc on 27 January 2019, and in Ottawa at the Mayfair Theatre on 17 February 2019.

=== Critical response ===
Former Montreal Gazette veteran critic and co-organizer of the Knowlton festival John Griffin reportedly called the documentary "a quirky and vastly entertaining" film.

=== Accolade ===
- Jury Prize, Illuminate Film Festival, 2018 (Best Documentary)
