= Boredom (film) =

2012 Canadian satirical documentary film

- Film poster
- Directed by: Albert Nerenberg
- Written by: Albert Nerenberg
- Produced by: Ina Fichman; Shannon Brown
- Narrated by: Albert Nerenberg
- Music by: Paul Baraka
- Production companies: Ennui Inc. (Elevator Films), Documentary Channel, Canal D
- Release date: 14 October 2012 (FNC)
- Running time: 62 minutes
- Country: Canada
- Language: English

Boredom is a 2012 Canadian satirical documentary film directed by Albert Nerenberg and produced by Ina Fichman and Shannon Brown. The film was commissioned by the Documentary Channel and Canal D. Although the film's tone is satirical, the film presents serious scientific research then exclusive to the documentary indicating boredom impedes learning and may in fact be a state of stress.

== Synopsis ==
The documentary examines how boredom negatively impacts health, driving people either to morbidity or high risk behaviours, possibly playing a part in the 2011 England riots, and in addiction, among other social problems. Nerenberg participates in a "boring" experiment conducted by researchers at the University of Waterloo, where he is made to watch a video of two men hanging laundry while his heart rate and cortisol levels are monitored. He finds himself bored within an extremely short time, and then anxious, nervous and uncomfortable, demonstrating that during boredom, cortisol hormone is released, an activity drug which creates stress.

The documentary features statements from a variety of experts, from psychologists and neurologists to scholars on topics like education and technology, as the documentary examines how mass education in industrialized countries chronically bores students because of the essential sedentary nature of modern education, and our relationship with new technologies. Modern civilization actually promotes chronic boredom with stimulating media "that only appears to be exciting."

Interviewees include Jon Bradley, Alan Caruba, and Colleen Merrifield.

== Production ==
=== Inspiration ===
In a podcast interview with Doug Gordon, Albert Nerenberg states that he frequently makes films about "the obvious", things hiding in plain sight. While researching the science of fun, helost his iPhone for 48 hours, and had an acute sense of boredom and began wondering what it really was. In the course of investigating it, he was "shocked" to discover no documentary had ever been made on the subject of boredom, and that this led to the further realization that there was evidently very little research on boredom. In the podcast, he suggests the reason for the lack of research into boredom is that universities have a direct interest in "not delving too deep, because they themselves are great purveyors of boredom".

=== Financing ===
The film received funding from the Canada Media Fund, and the Rogers Documentary Fund.

=== Filming ===
Nerenberg uses a variety of filmmaking styles, from research presented by experts, to B-roll and stock footage, to dramatizations and what David King describes as Daily Show style interviews.

== Release ==
Boredom had its world premiere at the Festival du nouveau cinéma in Montréal on 14 October 2012, where it was in competition with other films in the Canadian Focus section. It went on to be screened at the Visions du Réel and DOXA Documentary Film Festivals in Nyon, Switzerland and Vancouver at the Vancity Theatre, in April and May 2013. A special Toronto screening following the presentation of the "Boring Awards" took place at the Royal Cinema on 21 May 2013.

=== Broadcasting ===
The documentary was aired on television in Canada on the Documentary Channel on 8 June 2013, and in French on Canal D later that summer. It was also broadcast internationally on Swiss and German TV, Channel 8 Israel, Finland TV1, and Sweden Educational TV.

=== Home media and streaming ===
Boredom was released on DVD on 27 November 2013 by Disinformation Video, and on all video on demand and digital platforms. Disinformation released a second DVD with bonus features on 12 August 2014, including deleted scenes, including a segment on the positive aspect of boredom: "If not for boredom, what motivates people to experiment and invent new things?" Another bonus is a version of the film sped up 10% "to combat the potential boredom of viewers". There is also a three-minute featurette on the stages of boredom and a four-minute feature on a proposed artificial mountain in an area of the Netherlands to add interest to the region's otherwise flat landscape.

The documentary is available for streaming on Amazon Prime.

== Critical reception ==
FNC co-founder and artistic director Claude Chamberlan called Boredom a "must see", while John Griffin, writing for the Montreal Gazette, called the documentary "hugely entertaining".

Writer and critic Anne Brodie calls the documentary "vastly entertaining", with the caveat that the film is not a "real" study as much as a Reefer Madness kind of exercise: "Some academics are interviewed and medical facts are tossed around, which is all good, but at its heart this is just fun to watch." David King, writing for Cinema Retro, agrees for the most part, contending the film misses the mark a little by giving equal weight to experts and "more anecdotal evidence on the effects of boredom," and considers the film more infotainment than profound research. "In short, there are plenty of less interesting ways you could spend an hour than watching this film", adding that the film is "never boring." C.S. Strowbridge, writing for The Numbers, is of two minds about Nerenberg's style, which "tends to be a little over-dramatic when talking about these subjects", but otherwise "this is a truly fascinating documentary. We do get some answers to a few of the questions that are asked, but the questions that we don't yet have answers to are just as intriguing."

== Marketing and related works ==
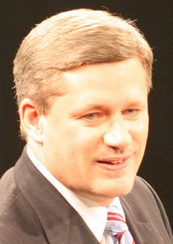
Stephen Harper was voted Most Boring Canadian

Several months after the film's initial release, an event called the "Boring Awards" was organized in advance of the film's first Toronto screening. Winners included Toronto mayor Rob Ford (Least Boring Canadian), Prime Minister Stephen Harper (Most Boring Canadian) and Canada's capital city of Ottawa (Most Boring City in Canada). Nerenberg explained the process of determining the winners was not "rigidly scientific":

We open-nominated on Facebook, Twitter and on the web and about 17 cities were nominated. We narrowed the field down to five. Then we looked at substantiation. For example all the cities on the boring list are legendary in terms of boredom. There's a film being made in Ottawa called The City that Fun Forgot. Abbotsford is defined in the Urban Dictionary as boredom. But Ottawa clinched mainly because the government there brags about how boring it is. As well, Ottawa must have a greater marketing and entertainment budget than any other city so it's boringness is less excusable.
