= Mazzucchi =

Mazzucchi is a surname. Notable people with the surname include:

- Alfredo Mazzucchi (1878–1972), Italian composer and musician
- Andrea Mazzucchi (born 1966), Italian American entrepreneur, network architect, and computer specialist
- Massimiliano Mazzucchi (born 1980), Italian diver
