= Mazzocchi =

Mazzocchi may refer to:

- Domenico Mazzocchi (1592–1665), Italian composer, brother of Virgilio
- Virgilio Mazzocchi (1597–1646), Italian composer, brother of Domenico
- Juan Mazzocchi (born 1997), Argentine footballer
- Mazzocchi brothers, rival mafiosi of Ruggerio "Richie the Boot" Boiardo's
- A plant of the genus Corchorus
- Part of a chaperon (hood or headgear)

== See also ==
- Marzocchi, an Italian manufacturer of suspension components for motorcycles and bicycles
- Andrea Mazzucchi (born 1966), Italian-American computer specialist and entrepreneur
