= Carlo M. Cipolla =

Italian economic historian (1922–2000)

Carlo Maria Cipolla
- Born: 15 August 1922; Pavia
- Died: 5 September 2000 (aged 78); Pavia

Academic background
- Education: University of Pavia; University of Paris; London School of Economics

Academic work
- Discipline: Economic history

Carlo Maria Cipolla (15 August 1922 – 5 September 2000) was an Italian economic historian. He was a member of both the American Academy of Arts and Sciences and the American Philosophical Society.

== Biography ==
As a young man, Cipolla wanted to teach history and philosophy in an Italian high school, and therefore enrolled at the political science faculty at the University of Pavia. While a student there, he discovered his passion for economic history, thanks to professor Franco Borlandi, a specialist in medieval economic history. He graduated from Pavia in 1944. Subsequently, he studied at the University of Paris and the London School of Economics.

Cipolla obtained his first teaching post in economic history in Catania at the age of 27. This was to be the first stop in a long academic career in Italy (Venice, Turin, Pavia, Scuola Normale Superiore di Pisa and Fiesole) and abroad. In 1953 Cipolla left for the United States as a Fulbright fellow and in 1957 became a visiting professor at the University of California, Berkeley. Two years later, he obtained a full professorship.

== Essays ==
Cipolla produced two non-technical, popular essays that circulated in English among friends in 1973 and 1976, and then were published in 1988, first in Italian, under the title Allegro, ma non troppo ("Forward, but not too fast" or "Happy, but not too much", from the musical phrase meaning "Quickly, but not too quick").

The first essay, "The Role of Spices (and Black Pepper in Particular) in Medieval Economic Development" ("Il ruolo delle spezie (e del pepe nero in particolare) nello sviluppo economico del Medioevo", 1973), traces the curious correlations between spice import and population expansion in the late Middle Ages, postulating a causation due to a supposed aphrodisiac effect of black pepper.

=== "The Basic Laws of Human Stupidity" (1976) ===
The second essay, "The Basic Laws of Human Stupidity" ("Le leggi fondamentali della stupidità umana", 1976), explores the controversial subject of stupidity.

These are Cipolla's five fundamental laws of stupidity:

1. Always and inevitably, everyone underestimates the number of stupid individuals in circulation.
2. The probability that a certain person (will) be stupid is independent of any other characteristic of that person.
3. A stupid person is a person who causes losses to another person or to a group of persons while himself deriving no gain and even possibly incurring losses.
4. Non-stupid people always underestimate the damaging power of stupid individuals. In particular, non-stupid people constantly forget that at all times and places, and under any circumstances, to deal and/or associate with stupid people always turns out to be a costly mistake.
5. A stupid person is the most dangerous type of person.

Corollary: a stupid person is more dangerous than a pillager.

By creating a graph of Cipolla's two factors, we obtain four groups of people. Helpless people contribute to society but are taken advantage of by it; Intelligent people contribute to society and leverage their contributions into personal benefits; Stupid people are counterproductive to both their and others' interests; Bandits pursue their own self-interest even when this poses a net detriment to societal welfare. An additional category of ineffectual people either exists in its own right or can be considered to be in the center of the graph.

As is evident from the third law, Cipolla identifies two factors to consider when exploring human behavior:

- Benefits and losses that individuals cause to themselves.
- Benefits and losses that individuals cause to others.

Cipolla further refines his definition of "bandits" and "naïve people" by noting that members of these groups can either add to or detract from the general welfare, depending on the relative gains (or losses) that they cause themselves and society. A bandit may enrich himself more or less than he impoverishes society, and a naïve person may enrich society more or less than he impoverishes himself and/or allows himself to be impoverished.

Graphically, this idea is represented by a line of slope -1, which bisects the first and third quadrants and intersects the y-axis at the origin (the first quadrant is the top left). The helpless people to the left of this line are thus "semi-stupid" because their conduct creates/allows a net drain of personal resources with a small effect on societal welfare; the bandits on the left of the line may fit this description as well, although many bandits such as sociopaths, psychopaths, and non-pathological "jerks" and amoralists may act with full knowledge of the net negative consequences to a society that they neither identify with nor care about.

== Books ==
Cipolla's list of books includes:

- Studi di Storia della Moneta (1948)
- Mouvements monétaires dans l'Etat de Milan (1951)
- Money, Prices and Civilization in the Mediterranean World: Fifth to Seventeenth Century. Princeton University Press. 1956 – via Internet Archive.
- Le avventure della lira (1958)
- Storia dell'economia italiana: Saggi di storia economica (1959)
- Economic History of World Population (1962)
- Guns, Sails, and Empires: Technological Innovation and the Early Phases of European Expansion, 1400–1700 (1965)
- Clocks and Culture, 1300–1700 (1967), reissued 2003, with an introduction by Anthony Grafton
- Literacy and Development in the West (1969)
- The economic decline of empires (1970)
- European culture and overseas expansion (1970)
- Economic History of Europe (1973)
- Faith, Reason, and the Plague in Seventeenth-Century Tuscany (1977)
- The technology of man: A visual history (1980)
- Fighting the Plague in Seventeenth Century Italy (1981)
- The Monetary Policy of Fourteenth Century Florence (1982)
- Allegro ma non troppo (1988)
- Between Two Cultures: An Introduction to Economic History (1992)
- Before the Industrial Revolution: European Society and Economy, 1000–1700 (1994)
