= Stupidity =

Lack of intelligence

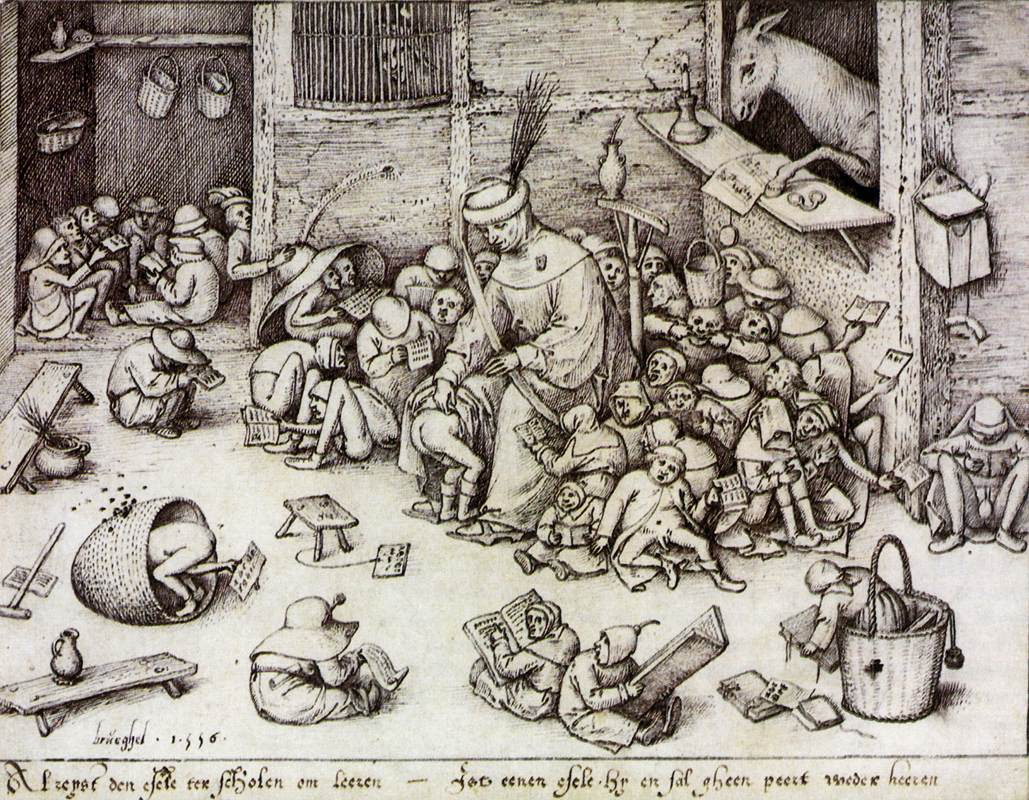
The Ass in the School – engraving after Pieter Breughel the Elder, 1556 Caption: Al rijst den esele ter scholen om leeren, ist eenen esele hij en zal gheen peert weder keeren. ("Even if the Ass travels to school to learn, as a horse he will not return.")

Stupidity is a lack of intelligence, understanding, reason or wit, an inability to learn which is innate or assumed. The word stupid comes from the Latin word stupere.

Stupid characters are often used for comedy in fictional stories. Walter B. Pitkin called stupidity "evil" but in a more Romantic spirit, William Blake and Carl Jung believed stupidity can be the mother of wisdom.

== Etymology ==
The root word stupid, which can serve as an adjective or noun, comes from the Latin verb stupere, for being numb or astonished and is related to stupor. In Roman culture, the stupidus was the professional fall guy in the theatrical mimes.

According to the online Merriam-Webster dictionary, the words "stupid" and "stupidity" entered the English language in 1541. Since then, stupidity has taken place along with "fool", "idiot", "dumb", "moron", and related concepts as a pejorative for misdeeds, whether purposeful or accidental, due to absence of mental capacity.

== Definition ==
Stupidity is a quality or state of being stupid, or an act or idea that exhibits properties of being stupid. In a character study of "The Stupid Man" attributed to the ancient Greek philosopher Theophrastus (c. 371 – c. 287 BC), stupidity was defined as "mental slowness in speech or action". The modern English word "stupid" has a broad range of application, from being slow of mind (indicating a lack of intelligence, care or reason), dullness of feeling or sensation (torpidity, senselessness, insensitivity), or lacking interest or point (vexing, exasperating). It can either imply a congenital lack of capacity for reasoning, or a temporary state of daze, or slow-mindedness.

In Understanding Stupidity, James F. Welles defines stupidity this way: "The term may be used to designate a mentality which is considered to be informed, deliberate and maladaptive." Welles distinguishes stupidity from ignorance, where stupidity means one must know they are acting in their own worst interest in that it must be a choice, not a forced act or accident. Lastly, it requires the activity to be maladaptive, in that it is in the worst interest of the actor, and specifically done to prevent adaptation to new data or existing circumstances."

== Playing stupid ==
Eric Berne described the game of "Stupid" as having "the thesis...'I laugh with you at my own clumsiness and stupidity.'" He points out that the player has the advantage of lowering other people's expectations, and so evading responsibility and work; but that he or she may still come through under pressure, like the proverbially stupid younger son.

Wilfred Bion considered that psychological projection created a barrier against learning anything new, and thus its own form of pseudo-stupidity.

== Intellectual stupidity ==
Otto Fenichel maintained that "quite a percentage of so-called feeble-mindedness turns out to be pseudo-debility, conditioned by inhibition ... Every intellect begins to show weakness when affective motives are working against it". He suggests that "people become stupid ad hoc, that is, when they do not want to understand, where understanding would cause anxiety or guilt feeling, or would endanger an existing neurotic equilibrium."

In rather different fashion, the novelist Doris Lessing argued that "there is no fool like an intellectual ... a kind of clever stupidity, bred out of a line of logic in the head, nothing to do with experience."

== Persisting in folly ==
In the Romantic reaction to Enlightenment wisdom, a valorisation of the irrational, the foolish, and the stupid emerged, as in William Blake's dictum that "if the fool would persist in his folly he would become wise"; or Carl Jung's belief that "it requires no art to become stupid; the whole art lies in extracting wisdom from stupidity. Stupidity is the mother of the wise, but cleverness never."

Similarly, the philosopher Michel Foucault argued for the necessity of stupidity to re-connect with what our articulate categories exclude, to recapture the alterity of difference.

== Impact ==
In his book A Short Introduction to the History of Stupidity (1932), Walter B. Pitkin warns about the impact of stupid people:

Stupidity can easily be proved the supreme Social Evil. Three factors combine to establish it as such. First and foremost, the number of stupid people is legion. Secondly, most of the power in business, finance, diplomacy and politics is in the hands of more or less stupid individuals. Finally, high abilities are often linked with serious stupidity.

Dietrich Bonhoeffer indicated stupidity to be "a more dangerous enemy of the good than evil" because there is no defense: "Neither protest nor force can touch it. Reasoning is of no use. Facts that contradict personal prejudices can simply be disbelieved." The great danger of stupidity manifests itself when it affects larger groups. In a larger group, "the stupid person will also be capable of any evil and at the same time incapable of seeing that it is evil". In more recent years, Bonhoeffer's argument has become known as his theory of stupidity.

According to Carlo Cipolla the efforts of stupid people are counterproductive to their own and other's interest. He maintains that reasonable people cannot imagine or understand unreasonable behavior making stupid people dangerous and damaging, even potentially more dangerous than a "bandit" whose action at least has a rational goal, namely his benefit.

== In comedy ==
The fool or buffoon has been a central character in much comedy. Alford and Alford found that humor based on stupidity was prevalent in "more complex" societies as compared to some other forms of humor. Some analysis of William Shakespeare's comedy has found that his characters tend to hold mutually contradictory positions; because this implies a lack of careful analysis it indicates stupidity on their part.

Today there is a wide array of television shows that showcase stupidity such as The Simpsons. Goofball comedy is a class of naive, zany humour typified by actor Leslie Nielsen.

== In film ==
Stupidity is a 2003 film directed by Albert Nerenberg. It depicts examples and analyses of stupidity in modern society and media, and seeks "to explore the prospect that willful ignorance has increasingly become a strategy for success in the realms of politics and entertainment".

Idiocracy, a Mike Judge film from 2006, explores a dystopian future America where a person of average IQ is cryogenically frozen and wakes up 500 years later to find that mankind, increasingly dependent on technology built by previous generations that it does not properly maintain or understand, has regressed in intelligence to the standards of current-era intellectual disability, and that he has become the de facto most intelligent person on Earth. Americans have become so stupid that society faces famine and collapse, and according to Pete Vonder Haar of Film Threat, "...each laugh is tempered with the unsettling realization that [Judge's] vision of mankind's future might not be too far off the mark".

== See also ==
- Anti-intellectualism
- Borderline intellectual functioning
- Bounded rationality
- Dumbing down
- The Dunciad
- Dunning–Kruger effect
- Dysrationalia
- Extraordinary Popular Delusions and the Madness of Crowds
- Eugenics
- Genius
- Gullibility
- Hanlon's razor
- Illusory superiority
- In Praise of Folly
- Intellectual disability
- Kakistocracy
- Pigasus Award
- Saneism
- Social Darwinism
- Supremacism
