= Let's All Hate Toronto =

- Directed by: Albert Nerenberg; Rob Spence
- Written by: Albert Nerenberg; Rob Spence; Hart Snider
- Produced by: Shannon Brown; Albert Nerenberg
- Starring: Rob Spence; Albert Nerenberg; Colin Mochrie; Dan Aykroyd
- Edited by: Rob Spence; Hart Snider; Wolfe Blackburn
- Production company: Elevator Films
- Distributed by: CBC Newsworld
- Release date: April 20, 2007 (Hot Docs International Documentary Festival)
- Running time: 75 minutes
- Country: Canada
- Language: English

Let's All Hate Toronto is a 2007 Canadian documentary film co-directed by independent documentarian Albert Nerenberg and Rob Spence. The documentary is a comedic examination of the reasons why so many people in Canada seem to hate Toronto, Ontario. In the film, co-director Robert Spence, nicknamed "Mister Toronto", takes off on a cross-Canada journey to find out why there seems to be so much resentment for Canada's biggest city, all the while promoting a fake "Toronto Appreciation Day".

== Synopsis ==
Mr. Toronto starts his journey in Hamilton after he sees a billboard boasting "Toronto Sucks" as an advertisement campaign. He finds out that some fans of the Hamilton Tiger-Cats put on bags over their heads because of the shame of losing to Toronto during the Labour Day CFL game every year. He decides to go around Canada on a fake "Toronto Appreciation Day" tour. Mr. Toronto visits St. John's and Halifax, where Atlantic Canadians spit on his "Toronto Appreciation Day" banner. Then he travels to Montreal where local comedy troupe The Dancing Cock Brothers sing "Goodbye Toronto, Bonjour Montreal" and where his Toronto work ethic influences the city to change the light bulbs on the giant cross atop Mount Royal. Next, he skips the Prairies (because "every Torontonian does"), and lands in Calgary and Vancouver, where he learns that resentment towards Toronto runs very deep. During the 2006 NHL Stanley Cup Final, he visits Edmonton where he risks his life by wearing a faux Wayne Gretzky Toronto Maple Leafs jersey during the Edmonton Oilers’ Stanley Cup run.

Let's All Hate Toronto then presents a list of the top ten reasons why Canada hates Toronto, including envy, violence, pollution and The Toronto Maple Leafs. In the end, Mr. Toronto is so discouraged that, like the Hamilton Tiger Cats fans, he puts a bag on his head and wanders into the fog at Toronto's Nuit Blanche art event, where, after admitting that Toronto does suck, he receives over 1,000 hugs from the Torontonians at the event, including then-mayor David Miller. This makes Mr. Toronto believe that his native city does not suck as the rest of Canada seems to think.

Throughout the film Mr. Toronto does several television and radio interviews and is frequently asked, "What city in Canada hates Toronto the most?" At the end of the film he realizes that Toronto hates itself the most.

== See also ==
- Toronto-Montreal rivalry
