= Albert Nerenberg =

Canadian filmmaker and journalist

- Born: October 13, 1962 (age 63); London, Ontario, Canada
- Occupations: director, journalist, hypnotist
- Known for: Filmmaking, Hypnotism, Oka Crisis, Laughing Championships, Trailervision

Albert Nerenberg (born October 13, 1962) is a Canadian independent filmmaker, actor, journalist, hypnotist, and self-described "laughologist" His films include Stupidity (2003), Escape to Canada (2005), Let's All Hate Toronto (2007), Laughology (2009), Boredom (2012) and You Are What You Act (2018).

== Film career ==
Nerenberg told the Montreal newspaper La Presse that he became a filmmaker after he smuggled a video camera through army lines during the 1990 Oka Crisis between armed Mohawk Warriors and the Canadian military. The footage was later turned into his first documentary, titled Okanada.

While still based in Montreal, some of Nerenberg's earliest films received acclaim, as well as some skepticism, "on the fringes" with "highly entertaining, low-budget documentaries", like Urban Anglo (1991) and 1949, so titled because it cost only $19.49 to make, taking advantage of the sophistication of Hi-8 video equipment at that time.

=== Trailervision ===
Nerenberg moved to Toronto, "like many young Montreal anglo filmmakers before him," where he would eventually achieve even greater acclaim with higher-budget documentaries. First, he founded Trailervision, with the premise that film trailers are a form of artistic expression in their own right. CNN called it an "international cult phenomenon." Nerenberg directed over 70 trailers for it.

In 2000, he performed a widely publicized prank at the 2000 Toronto International Film Festival. The director orchestrated the red carpet entry of a group of Trailervision actors as major movie stars. This was done by planting actors among the paparazzi who screamed the names of the fictional stars as they arrived by limo. The paparazzi responded by flashing their cameras frantically. The fake stars were rushed into the green room along with the real stars, "where they got drunk like showbiz kings". The prank is described in the online Museum of Hoaxes as The Toronto Film Festival Hoax.

=== Feature documentary filmmaker ===
In 2003, Nerenberg's breakthrough film Stupidity was released, and he organized the first annual World Stupidity Awards in Toronto a month later, a satirical awards show which went on to be sponsored by the Just for Laughs festival and took place in Montréal from 2004 to 2007, honouring the Stupidest Statement of the Year.

Nerenberg's Escape to Canada (2005) examines the results of Canada's brief relaxation of its marijuana laws at the same time that same-sex marriage became legal, along with Canada's abstention from the U.S.-led invasion of Iraq having made the country a perceived haven for progressive Americans.

In 2007's Let's All Hate Toronto, Mr. Toronto (Nerenberg's eye-patched co-director Rob Spence) embarks on a coast-to-coast Canadian tour to promote "the centre of the universe" by waving a banner that reads "Toronto Appreciation Day." Not long after, Nerenberg moved from Toronto with his significant other and child to take up residence in the Eastern Townships burgh of West Bolton, "where he does much hiking and laughing when not lecturing or making movies elsewhere."

His next two films, Laughology (2009) and Boredom (2012), both discuss aspects of phenomena as they are related to health and happiness which have gone relatively unexplored by science. Nerenberg organized the first Montreal Laughing Championships after attending a UFC fight were two fighters unintentionally started laughing during a stare down. "Punching people in the face is a sport. Poking people with sticks is a sport. Why not have a sport about the pursuit of joy?" Nerenberg told The Pacific Standard. Using stare-downs and laughing fits, 12 competitors would compete to see who was the champion. The laughers would be judged for their contagiousness effect on the audience.

Nerenberg currently co-hosts The World Laughing Championship which takes places annually online.

== Live performance: Hypnosis ==
At IdeaCity in 2014, Nerenberg made a controversial presentation suggesting that all drug and alcohol states can be replicated with hypnosis.

In a talk at TEDx Queens that went viral on Youtube, Nerenberg challenged the audience to take standard tests of hypnotizability. Many supposed audience members appeared to go to sleep, and some seemed to act like chickens. Nerenberg proposed that hypnotic chicken behaviour reveals a key aspect of human nature, that we believe our dreams.

Nerenberg also made a second TEDX, Surprise You're Hypnotized, where he tried to demonstrate the mechanism of rapid or shock hypnotic induction.

In 2025 Nerenberg did a demonstration of hypnosis at Modernist a private club in San Francisco, where the audience was deliberately kept close volunteers in trance. Nerenberg believes the reason why so many people believe hypnosis is fake is because they never see it up close.
