= Sedna IV =

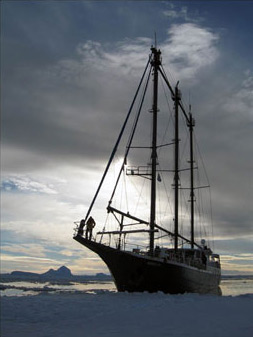
- S/Y Sedna IV

History
- Name: Bielefeld (BV 106)
- Owner: Bremen-Vegesacker Fischerei-Gesellschaft, Vegesack, Germany
- Port of registry: Germany
- Builder: Abeking & Rasmussen, Lemwerder, Germany
- Yard number: 5169
- Launched: 27 April 1957
- Completed: 7 June 1957
- Home port: Vegesack, Germany
- Fate: Sold
- Notes: Originally Delivered as a Sidefishing Trawler
- Name: Starfish (E 213)
- Owner: Harry Meldgaard Jensen and Hakon Svendsen
- Port of registry: Denmark
- Acquired: 9 February 1971
- Home port: Esbjerg, Denmark
- Name: Saint Kilda (E 218)
- Owner: Ebbe and Agne Svendsen
- Port of registry: Denmark
- Acquired: 18 July 1984
- Home port: Esbjerg, Denmark
- Fate: Sold
- Name: Syscomp I (1992), Saint Kilda (1998)
- Owner: Syscomp Shipping Ltd
- Port of registry: Antigua and Barbuda
- Acquired: July 1992
- Home port: St. John's, Antigua and Barbuda
- Fate: Sold
- Name: Sedna IV
- Owner: Les Productions Ciné-Bio Inc., Quebec, Canada
- Port of registry: Canada
- Acquired: May 2002
- Home port: Cap-aux-Meules, Magdalen Islands, Quebec, Canada
- Identification: IMO number: 5044312; MMSI number: 316327000; Callsign: VOKW
- Status: Active

General characteristics
- Tonnage: 394 gross register tons (GRT)
- Displacement: 550 t (540 long tons)
- Length: 51.34 m (168.4 ft)
- Beam: 7.9 m (26 ft)
- Draught: 4.2 m (14 ft)
- Ice class: Yes
- Installed power: 2 x Deutz-MWM Generators: 30 kiloWatt (each)
- Propulsion: 1 × Deutz-MWM: TBD 604LB V6 diesel 605 hp (451 kW); 1 × 1.6 m (5.2 ft) [Variable-pitch propeller]
- Sail plan: 650 m^{2} (7,000 ft^{2})
- Speed: 14 kn
- Range: 8,500 nmi (15,700 km; 9,800 mi) at 10 kn (19 km/h; 12 mph)
- Capacity: 8 Passengers
- Crew: 4

The S/Y Sedna IV is a 51-metre (167 ft) three-masted schooner which has been used for scientific expeditions and the filming of documentaries.

Built by Abeking & Rasmussen in Germany in 1957 as a Sidefishing Trawler, refitted as a sailing vessel in 1992, she was equipped with a film studio in 2001 when a Canadian film crew acquired her. The ship was previously named Saint Kilda. Sedna IV is fitted out with a cutting room and an equipment room containing high-definition filmmaking apparatus. The crew can use the onboard high-precision scientific equipment to gather, compile and analyze data to fulfill the expedition's scientific research program. The schooner is also connected to the internet via satellite, enabling land-based researchers to become virtual mariners.

The schooner has a 78,000 L (17,000 imp gal; 21,000 US gal) diesel reserve giving her a range of 8,500 nautical miles (20,000 km). She is also equipped with 700 square metres (7,500 sq ft) of sailcloth.

== Ship's log ==
27.04.1957: launched at Abeking & Rasmussen, Lemwerder, Germany, NB 5169

07.06.1957: delivered as combined motorlogger (herring drifter and sidefishing trawler), 31.39 23.33 GRT 147.84 NRT, 4x 7.94 x 3.62 m, engine: Deutz SBV6 M545 Diesel 4s6c 600 hp, Bielefeld BV 106, callsign DLDQ, to Bremen-Vegesacker Fischerei-Gesellschaft, Vegesack, Germany

08.07.1964: sailed into Lerwick, sailed out the next day

05.05.1966: owners restyled to Bremen-Vegesacker Fischerei-Gesellschaft mbH, Bremen-Vegesack

08.1969: ownership moved to Norddeutsche Hochseefischerei Bremerhaven, fishing off West Africa, under leasing arrangement to Ghana, but obviously only laid up there

12.1970: laid up in Tema, Ghana, inspected by buyers and Bernhard Blanke from owners

09.02.1971: sold to Harry Meldgaard Jensen and Hakon Svendsen (each 50%), Esbjerg, Denmark, renamed Starfish E 213, callsign OXUO, homeport Esbjerg, Denmark, tonnage now 296.74 GRT 152.31 NRT, sailed via Las Palmas, Canary Islands (for drydocking) to Esbjerg, then fishing on Northsea

21.03.1980: Harry Meldgaard Jensen sells his 50% to the sons of Hakon Svendsen, Ebbe and Agner Svendsen (now 25% each)

03.1984: Hakon Svendsen dies, his 50% moved to his wife

18.07.1984: renamed Saint Kilda E 218, the brothers Ebbe and Agne Svendsen take over their fathers 50% from their mother

10.1989: sold to Jörg Bartholomäus, Diedorf, Germany

05.1991: sold further to Dr. Bernd Schottdorf, Augsburg, Germany, at Jöhnk Werft, Hamburg-Harburg, converted to sailing vessel with indosail rigg

07.1992: ownership moved to Syscomp Shipping Ltd., St. John's, Antigua and Barbuda, renamed Syscomp I, callsign V2PL, homeport moved to St. John's, Antigua and Barbuda, tonnage now 394 GT 118 NT, 51.50 x (41.04) x 7.90 x 5.43 m, sailarea about 700 m2

05.10.1998: renamed Saint Kilda, for sale as owners are building another vessel

07.2001: sold to Raymond Helmer, Montreal, Canada and a group of shareholders

05.2002: after a major refit in the port of Cap-aux-Meules, Magdalen Islands, Quebec, Canada, renamed Sedna IV, owner: 3903109 Canada Inc., Quebec, Canada, homeport Cap-aux-Meules, tonnage now 394 GT 118 NT, 51.34 x 7.90 x 4.20 m

08.07.2002: leaving Magdalen Islands, 47°22'N 061°51'W, for an Arctic Mission (expedition) through the Northwest Passage

24.08.2002: reaching Beechey Island, 74°00'N 089°56'W, where Franklin wintered 1846 during one of his expeditions in search of a navigable Northwest Passage

10.09.2002: reaching Point Barrow, Alaska, 71°48'N 156°47'W, the most northerly point of the United States

23.09.2002: arrived at Little Diomede Island, 65°53'N 168°39'W, Bering Strait, landing denied by Russian Authorities

22.11.2002: arrived in Vancouver, 48°17'N 123°07'W, Arctic Mission completed

27.03.2003: ship owner adopts new corporate name, Navigation Sedna Inc.

01.02.2004: ship owner Navigation Sedna Inc. amalgamates with Les Productions Ciné-Bio Inc.
