= Giancarlo Livraghi =

Italian author and advertising executive

Giancarlo Livraghi (25 November 1927 – 22 February 2014) was an Italian author and advertising executive.

Born in Milan and graduated in philosophy at the University of Milan, while studying he had started working as a reporter, an editor and a bibliographer. His first full-time job began in 1952, when he joined as a copywriter in the CPV agency (Italian headquarters of Colman, Prentis and Varley) becoming a short time later the creative director of the agency. He worked for many major Italian and international companies of the advertising industry, also holding institutional positions.

As a scholar, starting from the 1990s Livraghi studied and analyzed in several publications the values of human communication via internet. He was co-founder, with Andrea Mazzucchi, and first president of ALCEI, initially conceived as the Italian branch of EFF.
