= Arctic Mission: The Great Adventure =

La grande traversée
- DVD cover (2005)
- Directed by: Jean Lemire; Thierry Piantanida
- Written by: Jean Lemire; Thierry Piantanida
- Produced by: Jean Lemire; (co-producers: Éric Michel Colette Loumède Stéphane Millière)
- Narrated by: Joël Le Bigot, Jean Lemire; (English: David Suzuki, Jean Lemire)
- Cinematography: Martin Leclerc
- Edited by: Frédéric Lossignol; Alain Belhumeur
- Music by: Hervé Postic
- Production companies: Glacialis; (coproduction: National Film Board of Canada, Gedeon)
- Distributed by: National Film Board of Canada: Terranoa (France)
- Release date: 31 October 2003; (FCMM)
- Running time: 52 minutes
- Countries: Canada, France
- Language: French
- Budget: C$1.16–1.18 million (estimated) (Note: This figure is based on dividing the collective budget of all five documentary films in the series, which was between C$5.8 million and C$5.9 million.)
- Box office: C$12,113 (Canada)

La grande traversée (English: The Great Adventure; also: Voyage of the Sedna (US); The Great Crossing) is a 2003 Canada-France short documentary film written and directed by Jean Lemire and Thierry Piantanida, as well as co-produced and co-narrated by Jean Lemire, made to foster awareness of global warming as seriously jeopardizing a fragile Arctic ecosystem, the first installment of the documentary series Mission Arctique (Arctic Mission), encompassing a five-month 2002 scientific expedition aboard the Sedna IV on a voyage from Montreal to Vancouver through the Northwest Passage, with the "beauty and fragility" of the Canadian Arctic Archipelago on full display.

== Synopsis ==
The story of a journey, told partly in the form of a travel diary. A crew of filmmakers, scientists, and seasoned sailors, undertake a five-month, 21,000-kilometre scientific mission to record the impact of global warming on the islands of the Canadian Arctic. The crew navigate the three-masted sailing yacht Sedna IV through the Northwest Passage, a treacherous, ice-choked route. The voyage begins in the Magdalen Islands near Montréal and ends in Vancouver, with stops including Beechey Island, where John Franklin and his crew wintered in 1846 during his last expedition, underscoring how survival is a daily struggle in the Far North: the crew face unusually cold weather that makes navigation exceptionally perilous. Contacts with Northern inhabitants both help guide the crew and reinforce the documentary's message concerning the impact of human activity on the world.

== Production and related works ==
=== Development, financing, and the Sedna IV ===
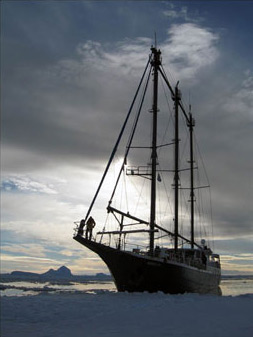
The Sedna IV

A biologist by training, mission leader Jean Lemire worked for the Canadian Wildlife Service before becoming a documentary filmmaker. He dreamed of filming an "environmental awareness journey" for twelve years. Writer Thierry Piantanida chronicled the work of the legendary marine documentarian Jacques Cousteau. Frédéric Back and David Suzuki were honorary presidents of the project, which was two years in the making, a period of "intense efforts and negotiations". Canadian public-sector partners on the project included the Government of Canada, Telefilm Canada, the Canadian Television Fund, SODEC and the Quebec Ministry of Culture and Communications, while French participation was officiated through the Centre national cinématographique Canada-France and the Ministère délégué à la recherche et aux nouvelles technologies.

Originally, the team hoped to find a modest 18-metre sailing vessel that would suit their purposes. In 2001, Lemire and five others acquired a 51-metre steel-hauled sailboat which had been refurbished from a North Sea fishing boat in 1992, and re-fitted it into an expedition vessel with cabins to sleep twenty crew, two DVC Pro editing suites, three high-density cameras and a system of satellite communication which would allow hundreds of thousands to follow the voyage. Rechristened the Sedna IV after the Inuit goddess of the sea, the three-masted schooner was now an oceanographic vessel and seagoing cinematographic studio, specifically designed for filming documentaries, collecting data for scientific studies, and serving as a "floating media lab" for students around the world.

=== Crew, supplies, and itinerary ===
For a journey projected as lasting up to six months, the Sedna IV had a permanent crew of fifteen, including a doctor, skilled underwater divers and the filmmakers, picking up other researchers and scientists along the way, with a supply of 7.2 tonnes of food and 78,000 litres of fuel.

The ship was supposed to depart on 16 June 2002 from the Gulf of Saint Lawrence, but was delayed almost two weeks due to heavy ice conditions off the coast of Labrador. After sailing along the Labrador coast, the ship would continue through the Hudson's Strait and Isabella Bay near Clyde River before visiting Pond Inlet for two or three weeks, then moving on to Resolute Bay to await the best window to the Northwest Passage. From there it would move into the Beaufort Sea and come through the Bering Strait to reach Vancouver. The Sedna IV was only the seventh sailboat in history to make the legendary Northwest Passage from east to west.

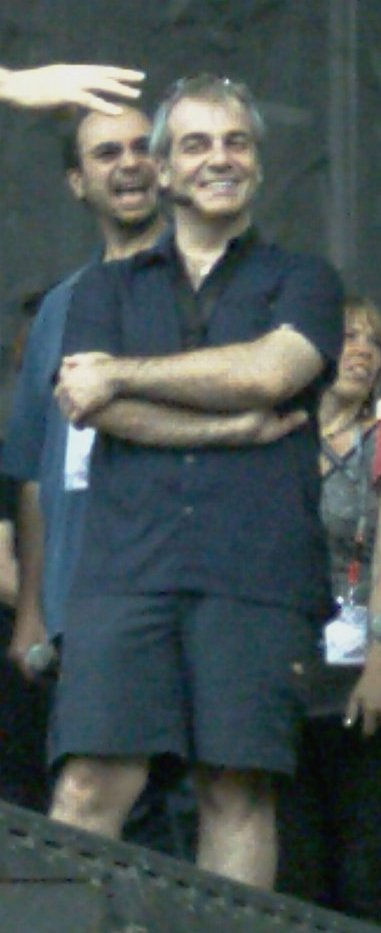
Jean Lemire in 2008

=== Series ===
The documentary film was the first in a series of five, all with the same producers but different directors, with a collective budget of $5.9 million, all shot on the same expedition under Lemire's leadership, with the project title, Mission Arctique (Arctic Mission), each one exploring a different aspect of the impact of global warming on Canada's North, including the effect on the region's Inuit and an analysis of world politics surrounding global warming, as Lemire explained:

It was important for me to make something on the North with people in the North, to be sure we really get Inuit involved... Very often what we do is go up North then come back and make the film. I think now it's important to give a chance to the Inuit to say what they have to say about the climate and global warming.

The Arctic mission sounded the alarm on the disastrous consequences of climate change on the Canadian Arctic Archipelago. Observations were made that indicated the region was warming, the ice was melting, and the sea level rising: a whole village of about 700 people was forced to move; polar bears were seen stranded on a sandspit far from shore, and more were seen starving in Hudson Bay; and robins were spotted in Iqaluit. Lemire was moved by what he saw in the Arctic, recalling his experiences in an emotional text posted to the Domaine bleue website in 2007, describing polar bear carcases along the beaches of Hudson Bay; how he once found himself up to his knees in melting permafrost that smelled of methane; and despair of those who vainly tried to stave off the waves of a swelling sea, calling them the North's forgotten inhabitants, the first "climate refugees".

=== Game ===
In 2005, an educational interactive quiz game DVD for children 9 to 12 was released. Arctic Mission: An Interactive Adventure allows its players to take four different voyages aboard the Sedna IV along with Jean Lemire and his crew through the Northwest Passage. The players' mission is to save the polar bears while rescuing the ship from potential dangers by answering multiple choice questions correctly. The game also includes a map, bear tokens, and a study guide offering suggestions to teachers of how to use in the classroom.

=== Later series and books ===
Lemire went on to make four more documentary series aboard the Sedna IV: Mission Baleines (Whale Mission), in search of the "last of the great whales" threatened with extinction; Mission Antarctique (Antarctic Mission), one of the "great expeditions of modern times," spanning 430 days of sailing, isolation, and extreme adventure in an uncompromising climate; Le dernier continent (The Last Continent), which became the most successful feature documentary in the history of Québec cinema; and 1000 jours pour la planète (1000 Days for the Planet), which set out to document and bear witness to the state of the biosphere, seeking out field researchers working to protect species and habitats around the world. As a collective body of work, the films made on the Sedna IV's expeditions set new standards in the field and have enjoyed remarkable success, having been distributed worldwide and have earned numerous prizes and awards.

On his return from the Antarctic, Lemire took advantage of the unparalleled popularity of that mission to launch an awareness campaign and actions to fight global warming, the biggest environmental public awareness campaign in the history of Québec. Both of his books based on the documentaries published by Éditions La Presse, Mission Antarctique (2007) and Le dernier continent: 430 jours au cœur de l'Antarctique (2009), enjoyed exceptional success in bookstores.

== Release ==
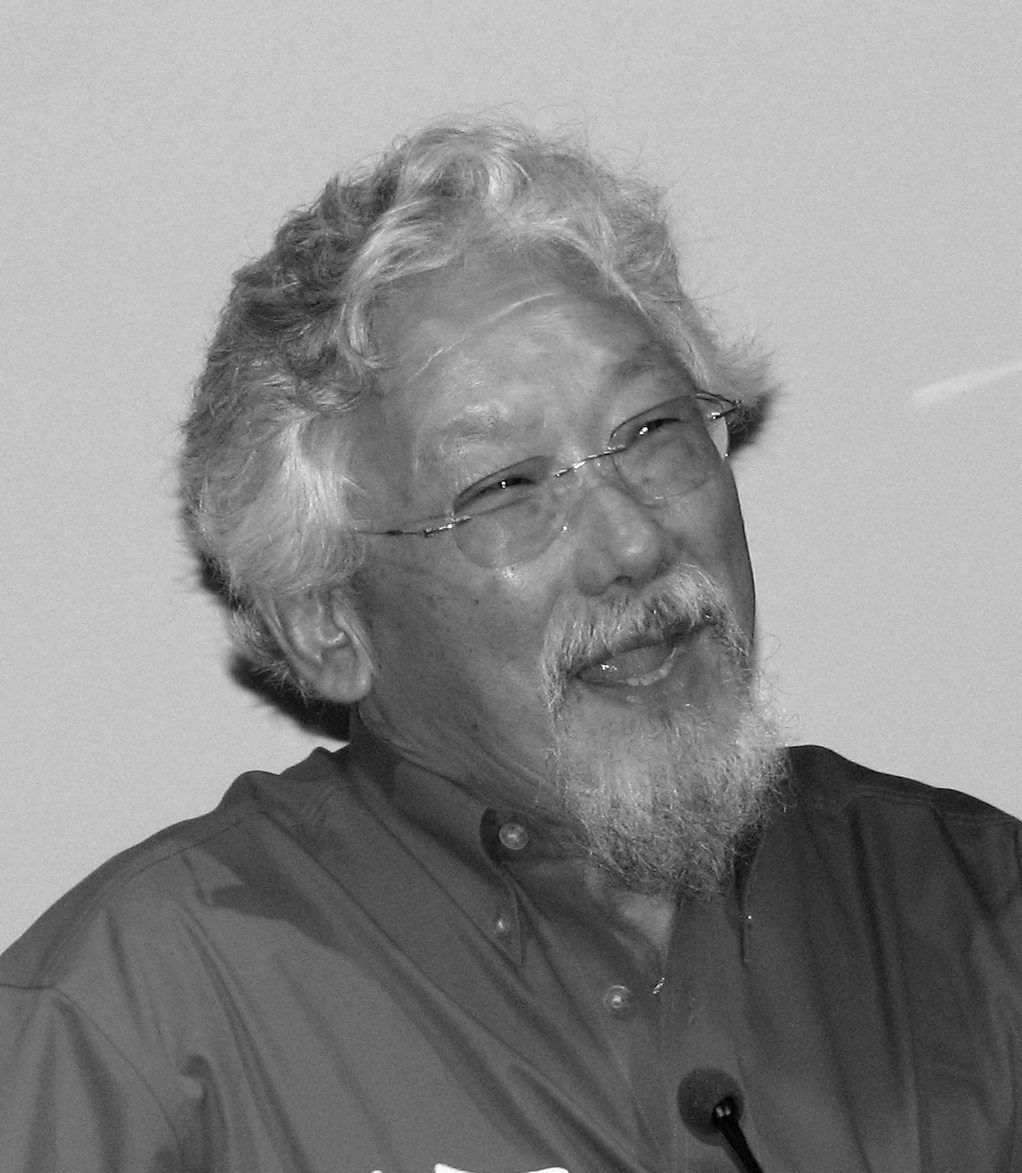
David Suzuki in 2006; one of the honorary presidents of the project, co-narrated the English version of the documentary series on The Nature of Things.

La grande traversée had its premiere at the Montreal International Festival of New Cinema and New Media on 31 October 2003. The documentary was screened at other film festivals in Canada and Europe, earning awards. There was a special screening before a United Nations commission in December 2003.

=== Broadcasts ===
All five documentaries were intended for broadcast on television in Canada and Europe. The series was first broadcast in Canada on Télé-Québec starting on 12 November 2003, while the English version was broadcast beginning on 28 January 2004 on the CBC's The Nature of Things, with narration by David Suzuki. In the United States, it was broadcast starting on 24 February on Discovery HD under the title Voyage of the Sedna. In France, it was broadcast on France 5 and later on France 2, the latter featuring a special 90-minute version. The film and its accompanying series were seen by ten million viewers worldwide.

=== Home media ===
Initially, La grande traversée was made available based on the 52-minute theatrical release on VHS by the National Film Board of Canada. A 90-minute special edition video CD was released on 11 November 2004. DVDs were also released.

In 2005, the five films of Mission Arctique were released together on a 5-disc DVD box set (260 minutes); the other four films' titles are: Menaces sur le toit du monde (Climate on the Edge), directed by Alain Belhumeur; Les seigneurs de l'Arctique (Lords of the Arctic), directed by Caroline Underwood; Le peuple de la glace (People of the Ice), directed by Carlos Ferrand; and À la dérive (Washed Away), directed by Patricio Henríquez.

== Reception ==
=== Commercial performance ===
La grande traversée was the fourth-highest grossing documentary film in Canada for the year 2003, collecting $12,113 in box office receipts, according to data from the Motion Picture Theatres Association of Canada. According to a National Film Board publication, it always played to a full house.

=== Critical response ===
Séverine Kandelman called the documentary a good family film, despite a few flaws in execution and a commentary which occasionally waxes a little too poetic. The film inspires admiration for the brave explorers who undertook the same voyage in hostile waters but with far less advanced technology, opening a window on a little-known world and serving as a reminder of the dangers of global warming. Louise-Véronique Sicotte agrees in the main: there is a great deal of information presented along with the powerful images, but Jean Lemire is a little too foregrounded in his own film.

Writing for Le Devoir, Odile Tremblay found the historic and geographic subject engaging, but the film is let down somewhat by the narration, in which Lemire seems to compare the conditions of his crew's mission with those endured by past expeditions, such as Franklin's, for which there is little basis of comparison given the great navigational and technology advances of the preceding 150 years.

=== Accolades ===
- Academy of Canadian Cinema & Television, Gemini and Gémeaux Awards, Best Sound in an Information/Documentary Program or Series, 2004
- Yorkton Film Festival, Golden Sheaf Award, Nature/Environment category, 2004

Other documentaries in the series also received nominations and honours (notably, the National Geographic Society's Earthwatch Award for Caroline Underwood's film), as did the series as a body of work.
