= Trailervision =

Canada based promotional video maker website

Trailervision was a website which featured movie trailer videos for fictitious films. It was established in 1999 by Canadian filmmaker Albert Nerenberg.

Trailervision's titles included "American Booty", "Gangstas In Love", "Girls Rule", "I Know What You'll Want Next Summer", "J2K: Jesus 2000", "Lance Banyon VS The Ku Klux Klan", "Modeman", the Office Sex series beginning with "Welcome to Office Sex", "Switched", "The Man With No Head", "Wimp Club", "Y2K"

Brooke D'Orsay was a member of Trailervision's in-house cast. Trailer videos were initially available without charge but eventually Trailervision charged a subscription fee for access except for a few selected videos. The website became defunct after 2009.
