= Documentary Channel (Canadian TV channel) =

Canadian documentary television channel

- Documentary Channel logo
- Country: Canada
- Broadcast area: National
- Headquarters: Toronto, Ontario, Canada

Programming
- Picture format: 480i (SDTV); 1080i (HDTV)

Ownership
- Owner: Canadian Broadcasting Corporation (82% & managing partner); National Film Board of Canada (14%); 4 independent producers (1% each)

History
- Launched: September 7, 2001; 24 years ago
- Closed: September 1, 2026; 2 days ago
- Former names: Documentary (2008–2016)

Links
- Website: Documentary Channel

Documentary Channel (stylized as documentary channel) was a Canadian English-language Category A specialty channel owned by the Canadian Broadcasting Corporation (CBC), the National Film Board of Canada (NFB) and four other independent producers. Its programming was devoted to featuring primarily documentary films along with documentary-style television series.

== History ==
Licensed as The Canadian Documentary Channel on November 24, 2000 by the Canadian Radio-television and Telecommunications Commission (CRTC), it was launched as the Documentary Channel on September 7, 2001 under the majority ownership of Corus Entertainment through their YTV Canada Inc. subsidiary (53%), the CBC (29%), the NFB (14%), and the following film producers at 1% each: Omni Film Productions, Cinenova Productions, Barna-Alper Productions, and Galafilm.

On May 11, 2006, Corus Entertainment announced that it would sell its 53% majority stake in the service to the CBC, bringing the CBC's interest to 82% from its former 29%. Corus decided to sell its interest in the service because it stated documentaries were considered a non-core asset and it wanted to further focus its attention on core assets: kids and family, women's lifestyle, and films. On June 22, 2007, the CRTC approved the deal and the transaction was completed.

On March 27, 2008 at 12:01 AM EST, the Documentary Channel changed its name to simply documentary, along with a new logo and on-air graphics.

In October 2013, Neil Tabatznik purchased eOne Television's interest (who gained ownership in the channel when it purchased Barna-Alper Productions in January 2008) in the channel.

In 2016, the CBC rebranded the channel again, slightly modifying the logo to introduce the word "channel", renaming it back to documentary Channel.

On May 7, 2026, the CBC announced that Documentary Channel would be closed on September 1, 2026 at 06:00 AM EDT; replaced by a new free ad-supported streaming television (FAST) Channel platform known as CBC Docs the next day on CBC Gem and YouTube. The last program to air on the channel was The Clues That Caught The Killer with the episode "Fred & Rose West".

== Documentary Channel HD ==
On April 1, 2011 the CBC launched a high definition feed of Documentary Channel, simulcasting the standard definition feed; which became available on Bell Satellite TV, Cogeco, Rogers Cable, EastLink, Bell Fibe TV, Bell MTS, Optik TV, SaskTel, and Shaw Direct.

== Logos ==
| 2001 – 2008 | 2008 – 2016 |

== See also ==
- List of documentary channels
- Documentary Organization of Canada
