= Compagnie van De Moucheron =

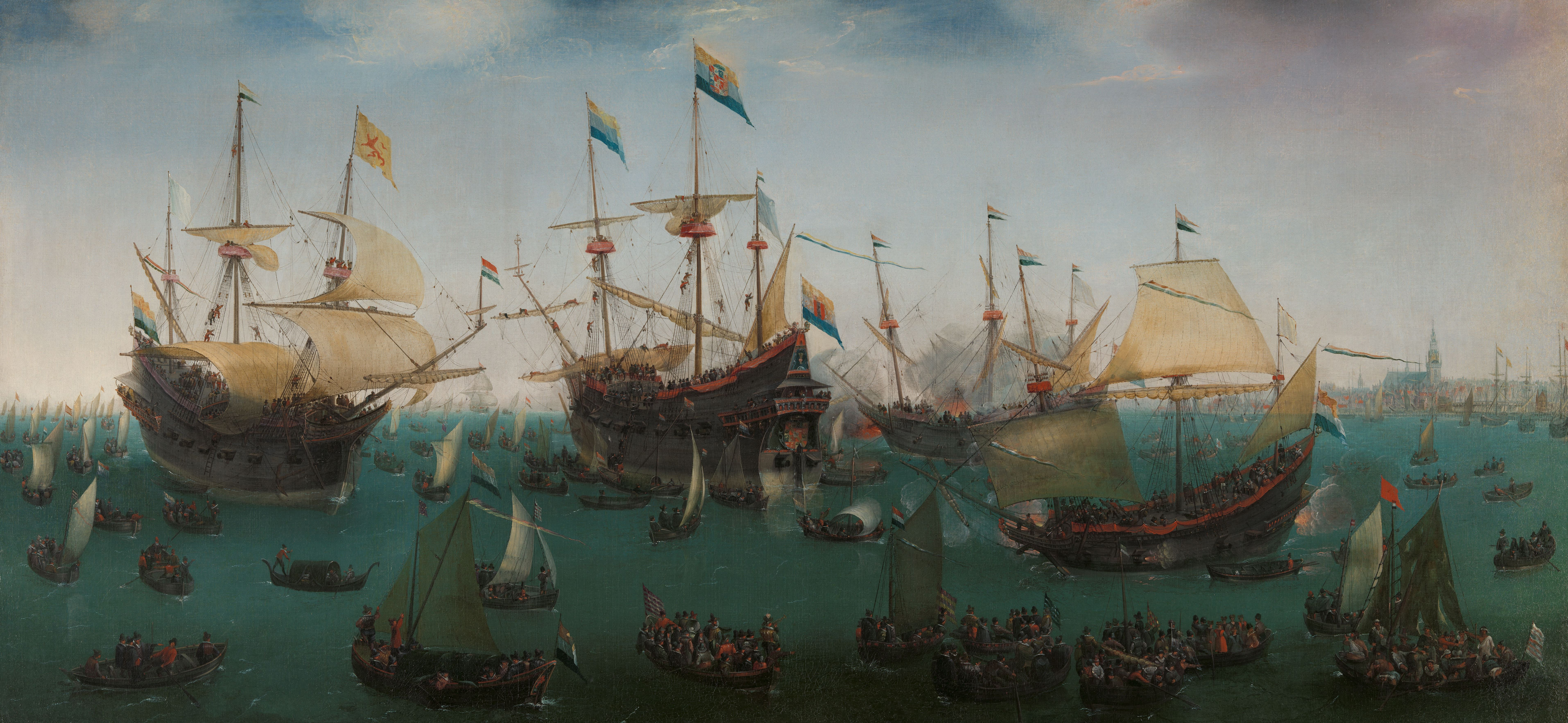
Return of the second Asia expedition of Jacob van Neck in 1599 by Cornelis Vroom (c. 1591 – 1661)

The Compagnie van De Moucheron (Company of De Moucheron) was a pre-company and precursor of the Verenigde Oost Indische Compagnie (VOC, commonly called the "Dutch East India Company"), from the Republic of the Seven United Netherlands (commonly called the "Dutch Republic"). It was founded by Balthazar de Moucheron, a ship owner from Antwerp in the Southern Netherlands. After the fall of Antwerp he moved his business to Zeeland. The fleet of the Compagnie van De Moucheron was made up of three ships, 'Ram', 'Schaap' (Sheep) and the pinasse 'Lam' (Lamb) and was headed by Joris van Spilbergen. Its fleet left on 5 May 1601 and returned to the Republic of the Seven United Netherlands in 1604.

== History ==
A voorcompagnie (pre-company) refers to one of the Dutch companies that traded with Asia between 1594 and 1602, before the smaller companies merged to form the Dutch East India Company (VOC). The pre-companies were financed by merchants from the Northern Netherlands and rich immigrants from the Southern Netherlands. Because of the deadly competition, the government forced the smaller trading companies to unite and form the (United) East India Company, that on its turn received exclusive rights for the trade with Asia for the following 21 years.

== Company of De Moucheron ==
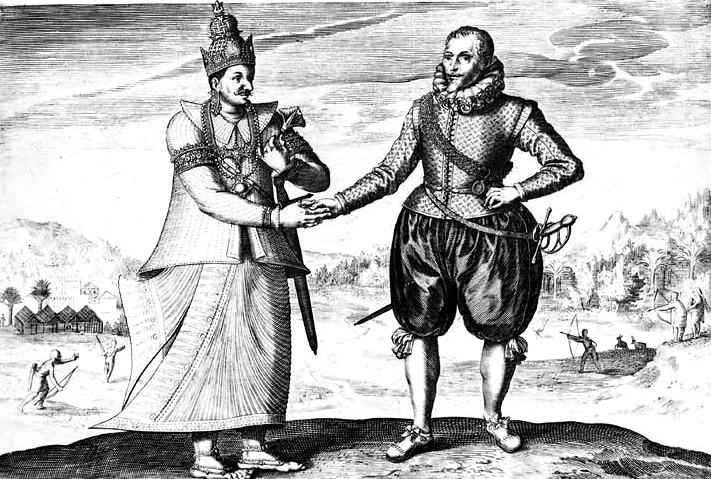
Joris van Spilbergen meets with king Vimala Dharma Suriya of Kandy, Ceylon (1602)

This trading company was founded by Balthazar De Moucheron after many of his partners left his earlier Veerse Compagnie and joined the Company of Middelburg in founding the United company of Zeeland.

In 1601 he sent Joris van Spilbergen with three ships, Ram, Schaap, and Lam, on a successful expedition to establish trade relations with the Kingdom of Kandy, and they eventually were to reach Atjeh. Van Spilbergen met the king of Kandy (Sri Lanka) Vimala Dharma Suriya in 1602, and discussed the possibility of trade in cinnamon. When van Spilbergen returned to Zeeland in 1604, carrying on board a treasure of rubies, sapphires, topazes and a variety of other gemstones, which he received as a gift from the maharajah of Kandy, the independent companies of Holland and Zeeland had already merged to form the Dutch East India Company.

== Citations ==
=== References ===
Sources:

- Unger, W.S. (1948) De oudste reizen van de Zeeuwen naar Oost-Indië. De Linschoten-Vereeniging LI. Den Haag: Martinus Nijhoff.
- Jonge, Jhr. Mr. J.K.J. de (1862) De opkomst van het Nederlandsch gezag in Oost-Indië, (1595-1610) Eerste deel Den Haag: Martinus Nijhoff
- ’’De familie de Moucheron’’. Rijksmuseum. URL bezocht op 12 April 2008.
- Wijnroks, E.H. (2003) Handel tussen Rusland en de Nederlanden, 1560–1640 Hilversum
- Gaastra, F. (2009) Geschiedenis van de VOC, p. 17-22.
- Witteveen, M. (2002) Een onderneming van landsbelang. De oprichting van de Verenigde Oostindische Compagnie in 1602
