= Voorcompagnie =

Companies forming the Dutch East India Company

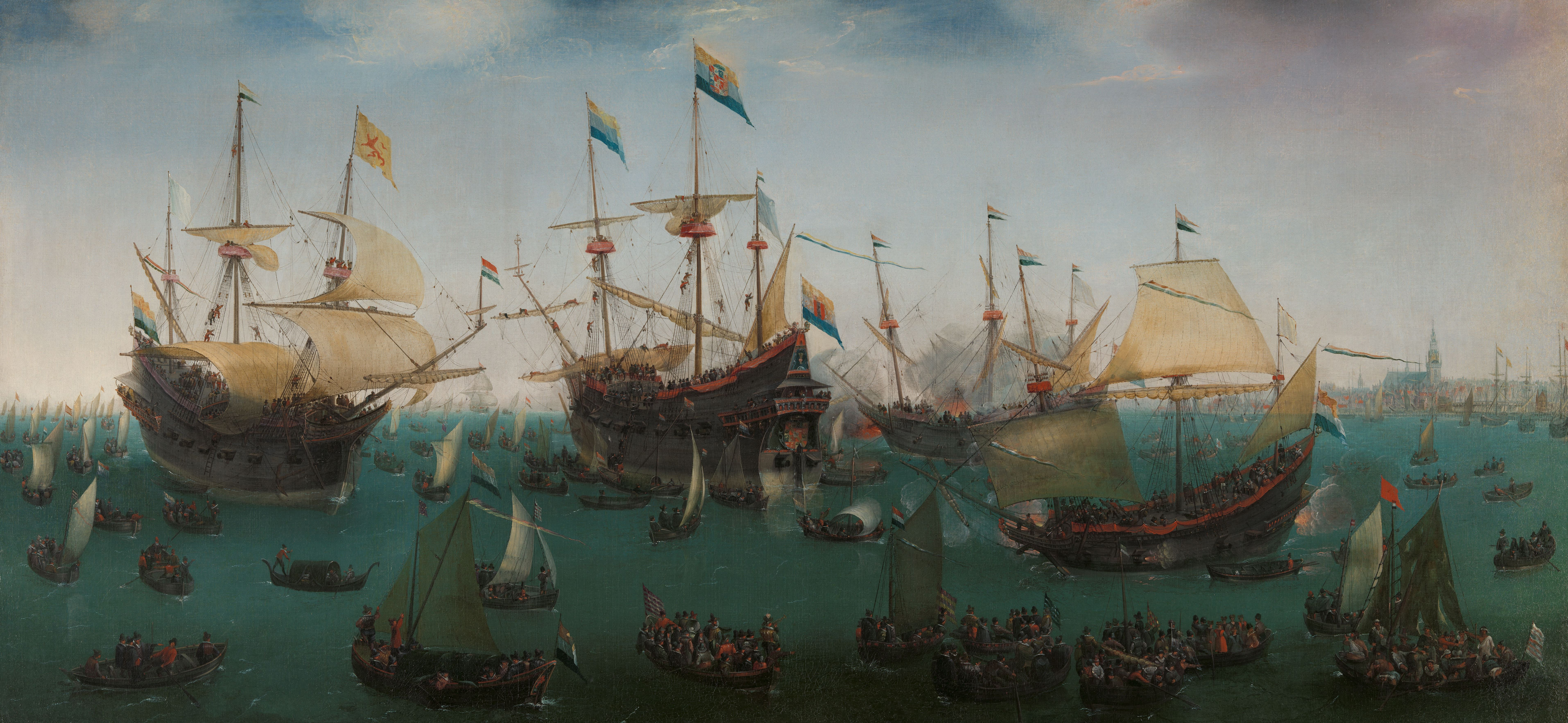
Return of the second Asia expedition of Jacob van Neck in 1599, by Cornelis Vroom (c. 1591-1661)

A voorcompagnie (pre-company) is the name given to trading companies from the Republic of the Seven United Netherlands that traded in Asia between 1594 and 1602, before they merged to form the Dutch East India Company (VOC). The pre-companies were financed by merchants from the Northern Netherlands and rich immigrants from the Southern Netherlands. The government forced the smaller trading companies to unite and form the (United) East India Company. In turn, it received exclusive rights to trade with Asia for the following 21 years.

== History ==
In the seven years before the founding of the VOC, 12 pre-companies were formed:

- Compagnie van Verre
- Nieuwe or Tweede Compagnie (New or Second Company)
- Oude Compagnie (Old Company)
- (Nieuwe) Brabantse Compagnie (Company of Brabant)
- Verenigde Amsterdamse Compagnie (United Company of Amsterdam)
- Magelhaense Compagnie (Company of Magelhaen)
- Rotterdamse Compagnie (Company of Rotterdam)
- Compagnie van De Moucheron (Company of De Moucheron)
- Delftse Vennootschap
- Veerse Compagnie (Company of Veere)
- Middelburgse Compagnie (Company of Middelburg)
- Verenigde Zeeuwse Compagnie (United Company of Zeeland)

According to Jaap ter Haar, "they were sailing the coins out of each other's pockets and the shoes off each other's feet". In total fifteen expeditions were sent between 1594 and 1601, excluding 3 troubled expeditions via North Cape (Norway).

== Citations ==
=== References ===
Sources:

- Unger, W.S. (1948) De oudste reizen van de Zeeuwen naar Oost-Indië. De Linschoten-Vereeniging LI. Den Haag: Martinus Nijhoff.
- Jonge, Jhr. Mr. J.K.J. de (1862) De opkomst van het Nederlandsch gezag in Oost-Indië, (1595-1610) Eerste deel Den Haag: Martinus Nijhoff
- Wijnroks, E.H. (2003) Handel tussen Rusland en de Nederlanden, 1560-1640 Hilversum
- Gaastra, F. (2009) Geschiedenis van de VOC, p. 17-22.
- Witteveen, M. (2002) Een onderneming van landsbelang. De oprichting van de Verenigde Oostindische Compagnie in 1602
