= Dutch East India Company =

1602–1799 Dutch trading company

United East India Company 1602–1799

- Company flag (1630)
- Native name: Vereenigde Oostindische Compagnie; Generale Vereenichde Geoctrooieerde Compagnie (original name); Vereenigde Nederlandsche Geoctroyeerde Oostindische Compagnie (formal name)
- Type: Partially state-owned enterprise
- Industry: Proto-conglomerate
- Predecessor: Voorcompagnieën / Pre-companies (1594–1602) (Note: The so-called voorcompagnieën (or pre-companies) include: Compagnie van Verre (Amsterdam, 1594–1598), Nieuwe Compagnie, Eerste Verenigde Compagnie op Oost-Indië (Amsterdam, 1598–1601), Oude Oost-Indische Compagnie (Amsterdam, 1598–1601), Verenigde Amsterdamse Compagnie, Nieuwe of Tweede Compagnie, Brabantsche Compagnie, Nieuwe Brabantsche Compagnie, Magelhaensche Compagnie / Rotterdamse Compagnie, Middelburgse Compagnie, Veerse Compagnie (Zeeland, 1597), Verenigde Zeeuwse Compagnie (Middelburg & Veere, 1600), Compagnie van De Moucheron (Zeeland, 1600), and Delftse Vennootschap. Niels Steensgaard notes, "the voorcompagnieën were not incorporated, but were run by a number of bewindhebbers, who were joined together like partners in a simple company, i.e. traded on joint account".): Compagnie van Verre; Brabantsche Compagnie; Compagnie van De Moucheron; Veerse Compagnie
- Founded: 20 March 1602; 424 years ago, by a government-directed consolidation of the voorcompagnieën/pre-companies
- Founder: Johan van Oldenbarnevelt and the States General
- Defunct: 31 December 1799; 226 years ago
- Fate: Dissolved and nationalised as Dutch East Indies
- Headquarters: Amsterdam, Dutch Republic (global headquarters); Batavia, Dutch East Indies (second headquarters or overseas administrative center)
- Area served: South East Asia; South Asia; Asia–Pacific; Southern Africa
- Key people: Heeren XVII / Lords Seventeen (Note: As the board of directors) (Dutch Republic, 1602–1799); Governors-general of the Dutch East Indies (Note: As the de facto chief executives) (Batavia, 1610–1800)
- Products: Spices, silk, porcelain, metals, livestock, tea, grain, rice, soybeans, sugarcane, wine, coffee, slaves

The United East India Company was the brainchild of Johan van Oldenbarnevelt, the leading statesman of the Dutch Republic.

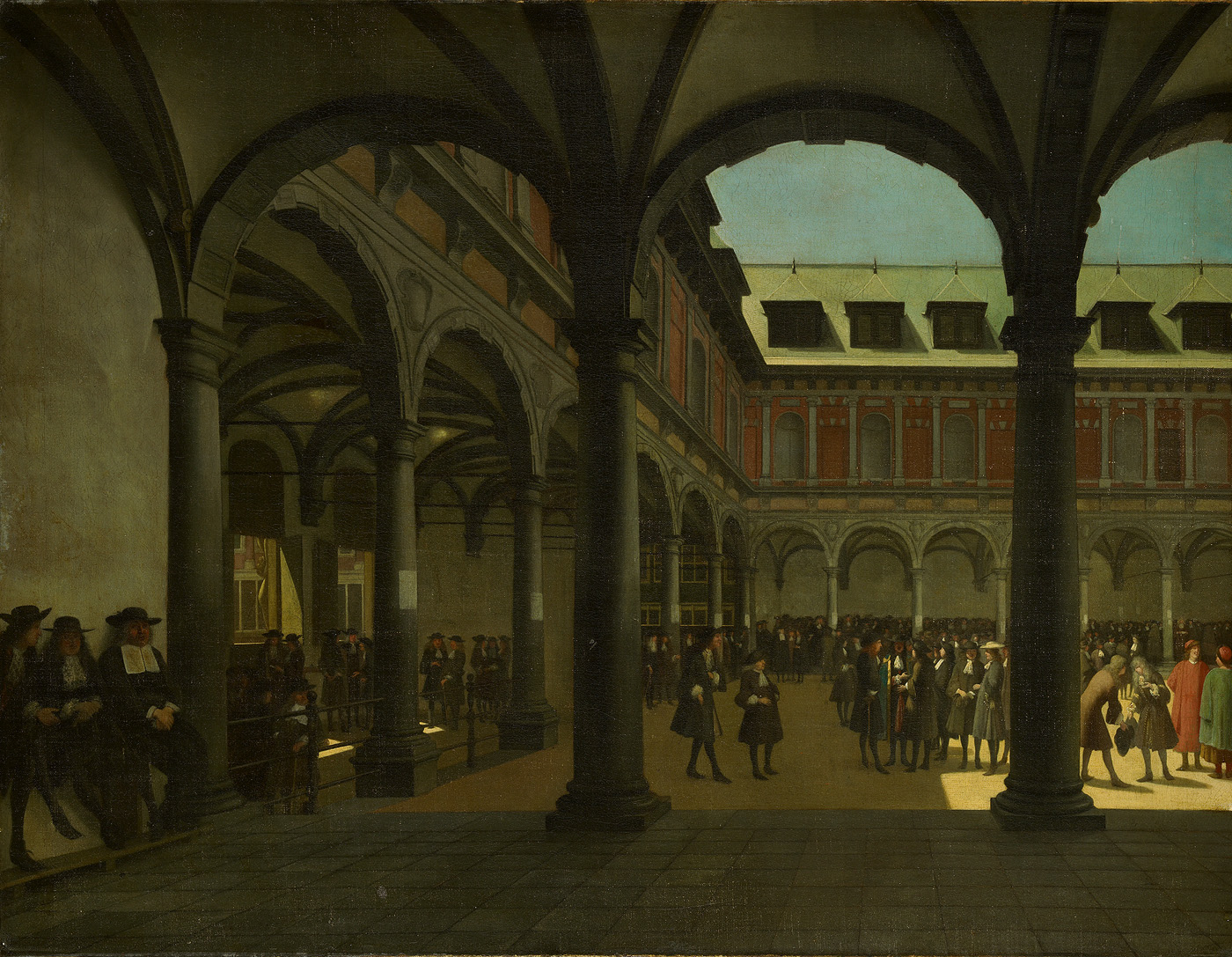
The stock exchange of Hendrick de Keyser

The United East India Company (Note: The direct translation of the Dutch name Vereenigde Oostindische Compagnie is United East-India Company. For the VOC's different English-language trade names, see articles: East India Company (disambiguation); Greater India; East India; East Indies; Dutch East Indies; Dutch India; Voorcompagnie; List of Dutch East India Company trading posts and settlements.) (Dutch: Vereenigde Oostindische Compagnie [vərˈeːnɪɣdə oːstˈɪndisə kɔmpɑˈɲi]; abbr. VOC [veː(j)oːˈseː]), commonly known as the Dutch East India Company, was a chartered trading company and one of the first joint-stock companies in the world. Established on 20 March 1602 by the States General of the Netherlands amalgamating existing companies, it was granted a 21-year monopoly to carry out trade activities in Asia. Shares in the company could be purchased by any citizen of the Dutch Republic and bought and sold in open-air secondary markets, one of which became the Amsterdam Stock Exchange. The company possessed quasi-governmental powers, including the ability to wage war, imprison and execute convicts, negotiate treaties, strike its own coins, and establish colonies. Because it traded across multiple colonies and countries from both the East and the West, the VOC is sometimes considered to have been the world's first multinational corporation.

Statistically, the VOC eclipsed all of its rivals in the Asian trade. Between 1602 and 1796, the VOC sent nearly one million Europeans to work in the Asia trade on 4,785 ships, and netted for their efforts more than 2.5 million tonnes of Asian trade goods and slaves. By contrast, the rest of Europe combined sent 882,412 people from 1500 to 1795. The fleet of the English, later British East India Company, the VOC's nearest competitor, was a distant second to its total traffic, with 2,690 ships and one-fifth the tonnage of goods carried by the VOC. The VOC enjoyed huge profits from its spice monopoly through most of the 17th century.

Having been established in 1602 to profit from the Malukan spice trade, the VOC established a capital in the port city of Jayakarta in 1619 and changed its name to Batavia, now Jakarta. Over the next two centuries, the company acquired additional ports as trading bases and safeguarded their interests by taking over surrounding territory. It remained an important trading concern and paid annual dividends that averaged about 18% of the capital for almost 200 years. Weighed down by smuggling, corruption and growing administrative costs in the late 18th century, the company went bankrupt and was formally dissolved in 1799. Its possessions and debt were taken over by the government of the Dutch Batavian Republic.

== Company name, logo, and flag ==
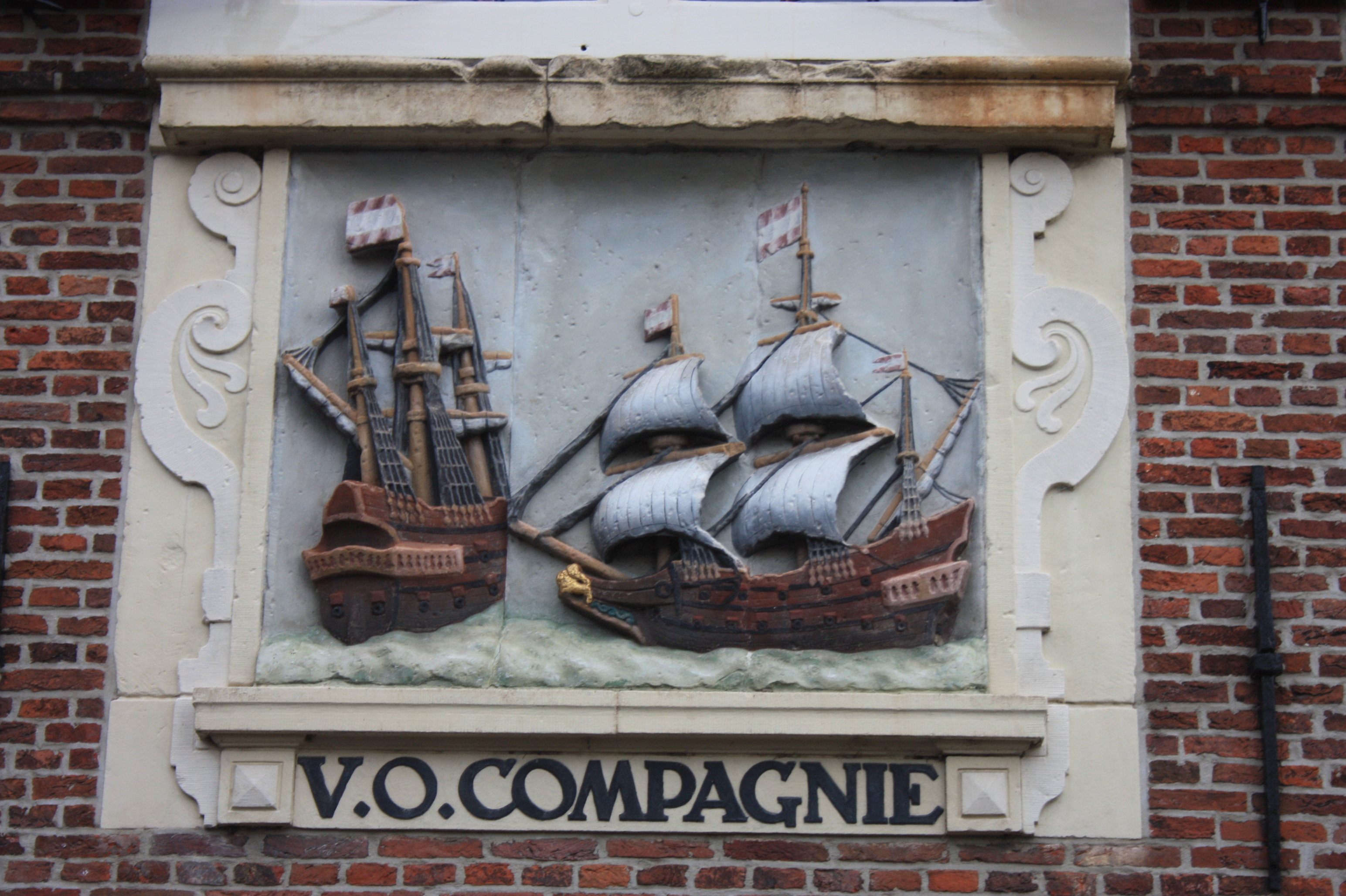
A 17th-century plaque to the [Dutch] United East India Company, the VOC, in Hoorn

The logo of the Amsterdam Chamber of the VOC

In Dutch, the name of the company was the Vereenigde Nederlandsche Geoctroyeerde Oostindische Compagnie, abbreviated as the VOC, literally the 'United Dutch Chartered East India Company' (the United East India Company). The company's monogram logo consisted of a large capital 'V' with an O on the left and a C on the right half and was possibly the first globally recognised corporate logo. It appeared on corporate items, such as flags, cannons, and coins.

Around the world, and especially in English-speaking countries, the VOC is widely known as the 'Dutch East India Company'. The name 'Dutch East India Company' is used to make a distinction from the [British] East India Company (EIC) and other East Indian companies, such as the Danish East India Company, French East India Company, Portuguese East India Company, and the Swedish East India Company. The company's alternative names that have been used include the 'Dutch East Indies Company', 'United East India Company', 'Jan Company', or 'Jan Compagnie'.

== History ==
=== Origins ===
Before the Dutch Revolt, which began in 1566/68, the Brabant city of Antwerp had played an important role as a distribution centre in northern Europe. After 1591, the Portuguese used an international syndicate of the German Fugger family and Welser family, as well as Spanish and Italian firms, which operated out of Hamburg as the northern staple port to distribute their goods, thereby cutting Dutch merchants out of the trade. At the same time, the Portuguese trade system was unable to increase supply to satisfy growing demand, in particular the demand for pepper. Demand for spices was relatively inelastic; therefore, each lag in the supply of pepper caused a sharp rise in pepper prices.

In 1580, the Portuguese crown was united in a personal union with the Spanish crown, known as the Iberian Union, with which the Dutch Republic was at war. The Portuguese Empire thus became an appropriate target for Dutch military incursions. These factors motivated Dutch merchants to enter the intercontinental spice trade themselves. Further, a number of Dutch merchants and explorers, such as Jan Huyghen van Linschoten and Cornelis de Houtman, obtained firsthand knowledge of the "secret" Portuguese trade routes and practices, providing further opportunity for the Dutch to enter the trade.

The stage was set for Dutch expeditions to the Indonesian islands, beginning with Cornelis de Houtman in 1595 and in 1598, Jacob Van Neck in 1598, among others. During the four-ship exploratory expedition by Frederick de Houtman in 1595 to Banten, the main pepper port of West Java, the crew clashed with Portuguese and indigenous Javanese. Houtman's expedition then sailed east along the north coast of Java, losing twelve crew members to a Javanese attack at Sidayu and killing a local ruler in Madura. Half the crew were lost before the expedition made it back to the Netherlands in 1596, but with enough spices to make a considerable profit.

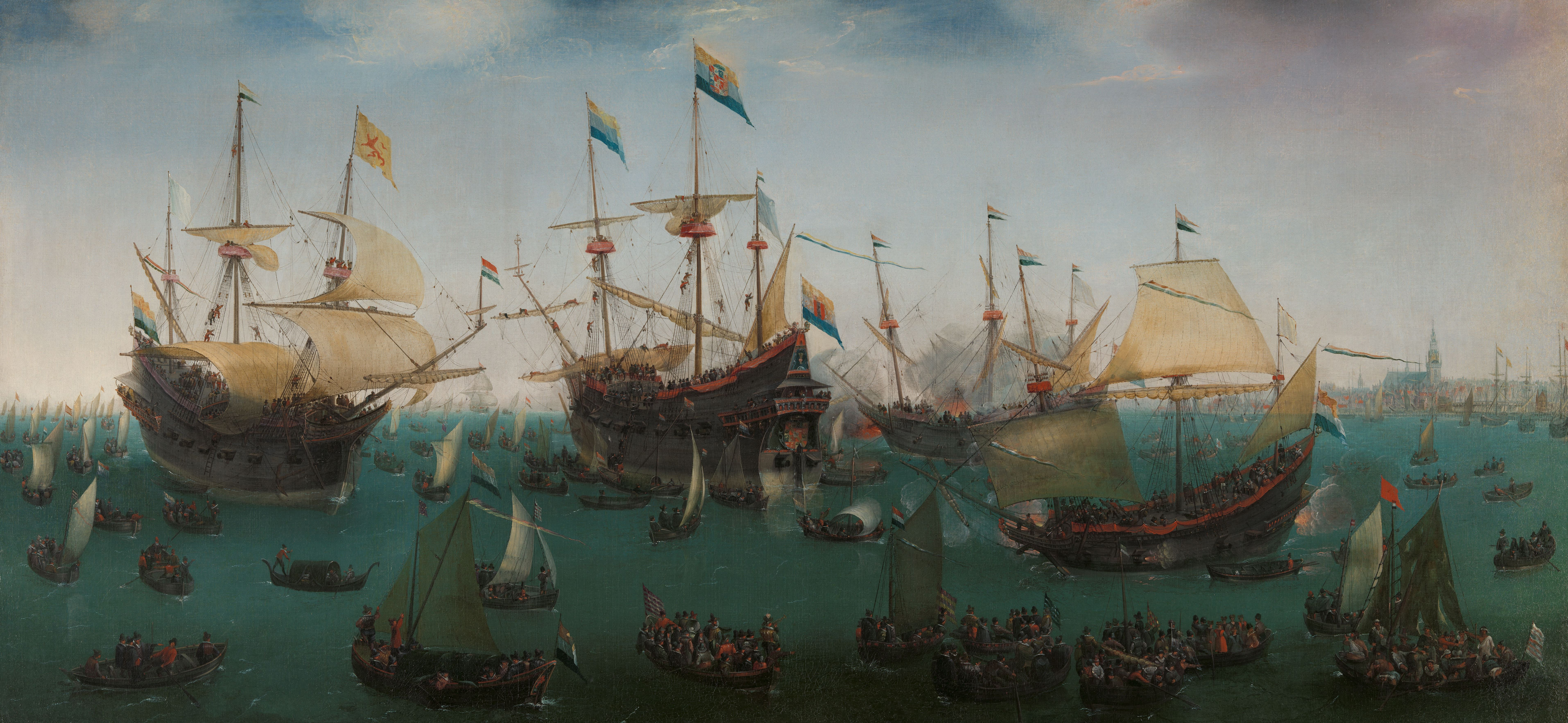
The return of the second Asia expedition of Jacob van Neck in 1599 by Cornelis Vroom

In 1598, an increasing number of fleets were sent out by competing merchant groups from around the Netherlands. Some fleets were lost, but most were successful, with some voyages producing high profits. In 1598, a fleet of eight ships under Jacob van Neck were the first Dutch fleet to reach the 'Spice Islands' of Maluku, also known as the Moluccas, cutting out the Javanese middlemen. The ships returned to Europe in 1599 and 1600 and the expedition made a 400% profit.

In 1600, the Dutch joined forces with the Muslim Hituese on Ambon Island in an anti-Portuguese alliance, in return for which the Dutch were given the sole right to purchase spices from Hitu. Dutch control of Ambon was achieved when the Portuguese surrendered their fort in Ambon to the Dutch-Hituese alliance. In 1613, the Dutch expelled the Portuguese from their Solor fort, but a subsequent Portuguese attack led to a second change of hands. Following this second reoccupation, the Dutch again captured Solor in 1636.

East of Solor, on the island of Timor, Dutch advances were halted by an autonomous and powerful group of Portuguese Eurasians called the Topasses. They remained in control of the Sandalwood trade. Their resistance lasted throughout the 17th and 18th centuries, causing Portuguese Timor to remain under the Portuguese sphere of control.

=== Formative years ===
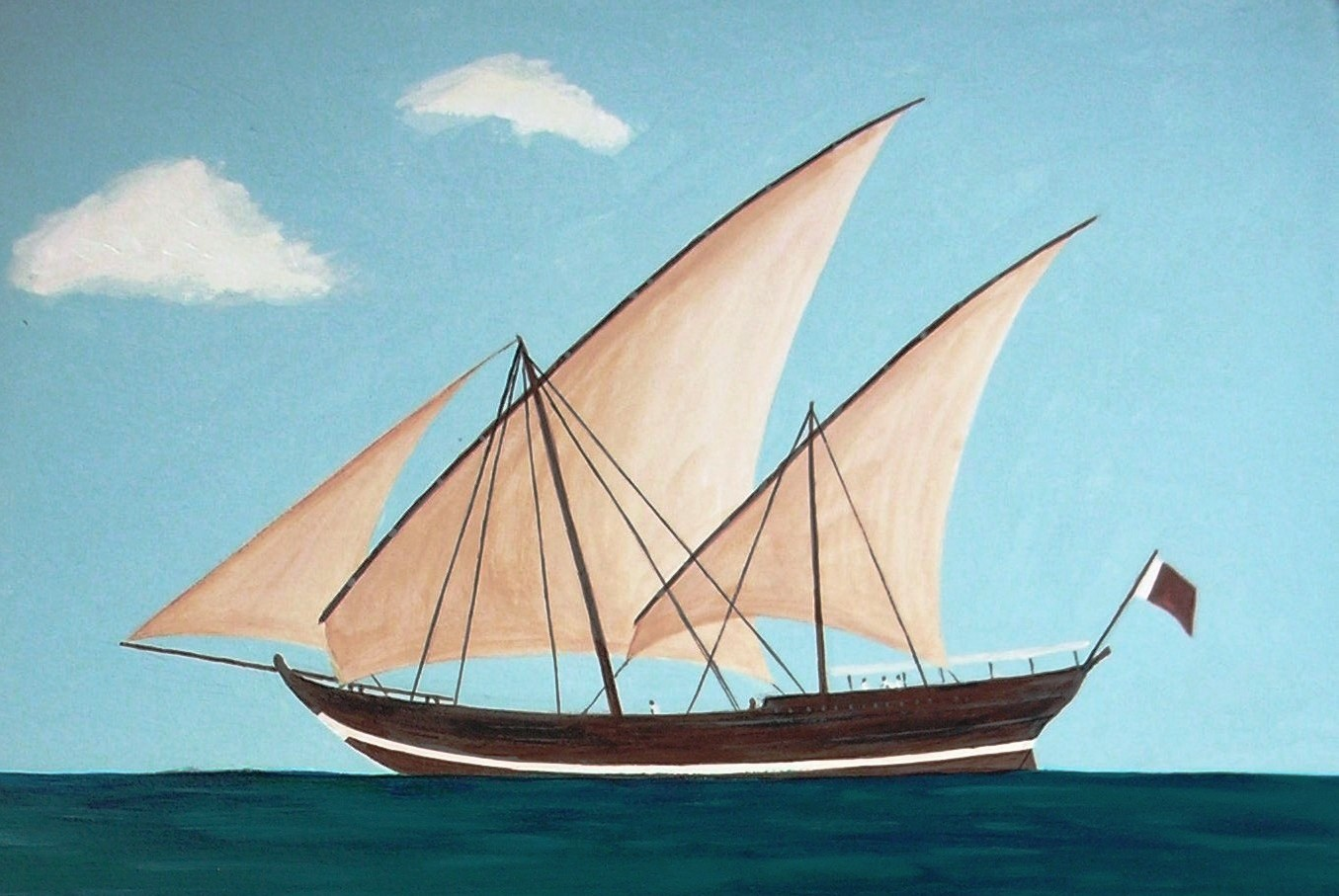
Mughal Bengal's baghlah was a type of ship widely used by Dutch traders in the Indian Ocean, the Arabian Sea, the Bay of Bengal, the Strait of Malacca and the South China Sea.

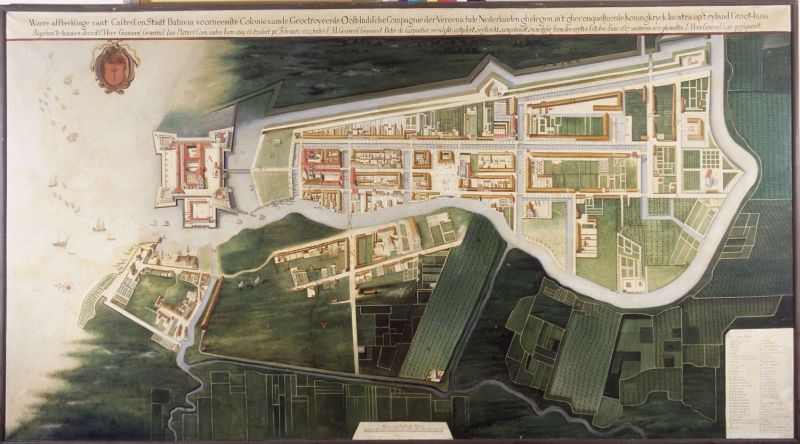
Reproduction of a map of the city of Batavia c. 1627, collection Wereldmuseum Amsterdam

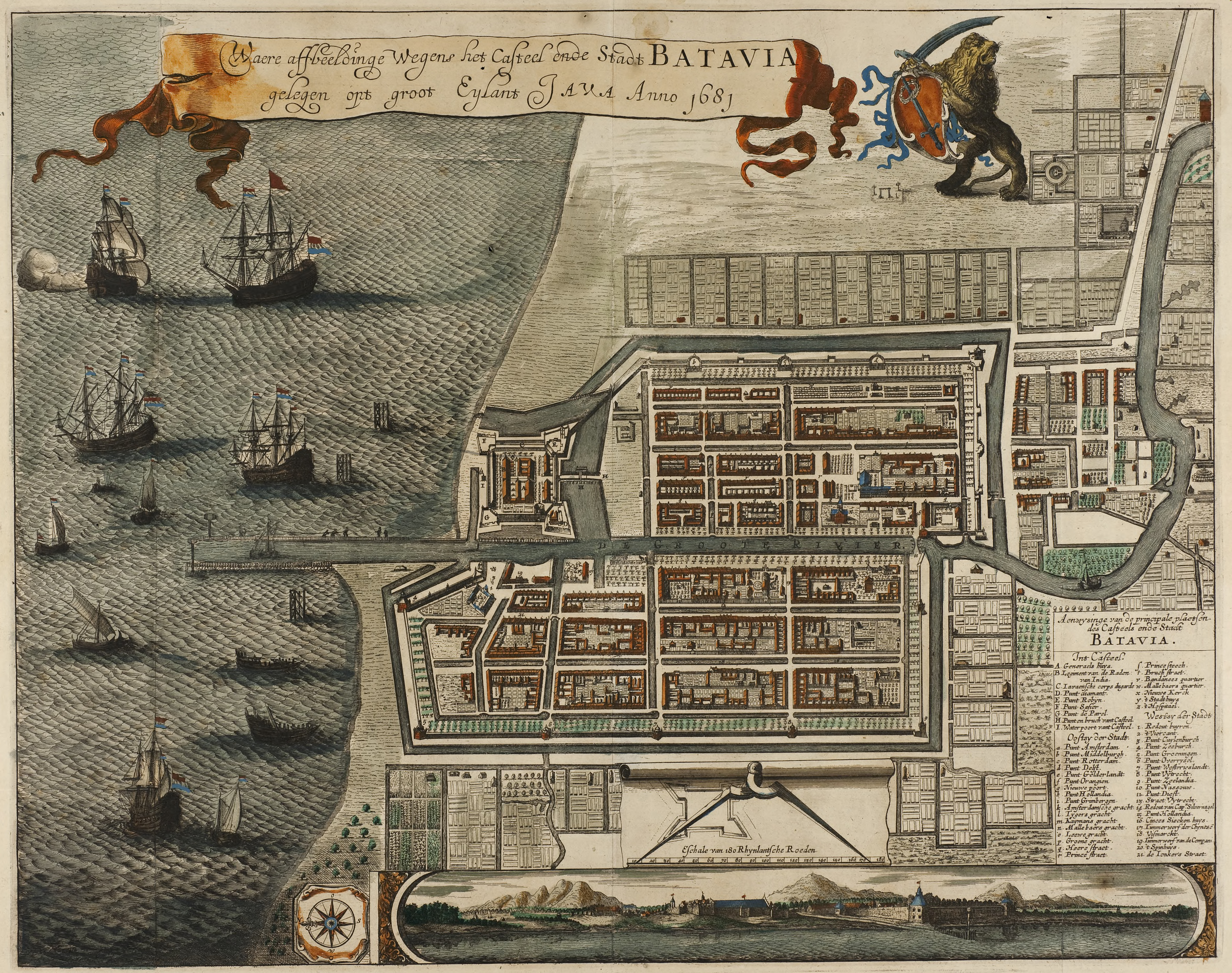
Dutch Batavia in 1681, built in what is now North Jakarta

At the time, it was customary for a company to be funded only for the duration of a single voyage and to be liquidated upon the return of the fleet. Investment in these expeditions was a very high-risk venture, because of the usual dangers of piracy, disease and shipwreck, and because the interplay of inelastic demand and relatively elastic supply (Note: In the medium term, as new suppliers could enter the market. In the short term the supply was, of course, also inelastic.) of spices could make prices tumble, thereby ruining prospects of profitability. To manage such risk, the forming of a cartel to control supply would seem logical. In 1600, the English were the first to adopt this approach by bundling their resources into a monopoly enterprise, the English East India Company, thereby threatening their Dutch competitors with ruin.

In 1602, the Dutch government followed suit, sponsoring the creation of a single "United East Indies Company" that was also granted monopoly over the Asian trade. For a time in the seventeenth century, it was able to monopolise the trade in nutmeg, mace, and cloves and to sell these spices across European kingdoms and Emperor Akbar the Great's Mughal Empire at 14–17 times the price it paid in Indonesia.

While Dutch profits soared, the local economy of the Spice Islands was destroyed, because as a monopoly buyer, the VOC forced the prices paid to the local producers in the Spice Islands down to low levels. With a capital of 6,440,200 guilders (equivalent to €265 million in 2024), the new company's charter empowered it to build forts, maintain armies, and conclude treaties with Asian rulers. It provided for a venture that continued for 21 years, with a financial accounting only at the end of each decade.

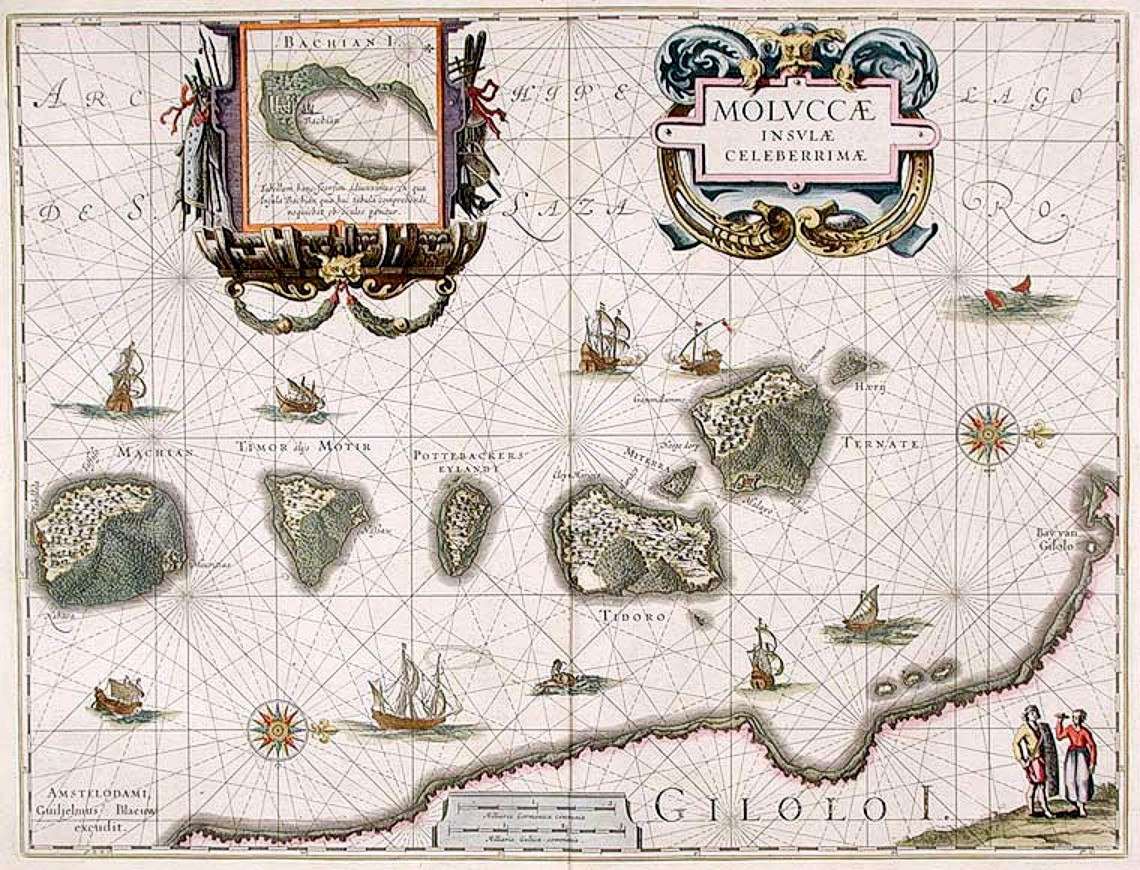
Early map of the Maluku Islands made during the Age of Discovery, by Willem Blaeu, 1630. North is on the right, with Ternate as the rightmost followed by Tidore, both were known as the Spice Islands (trade secret, outposts of the VOC).

In February 1603, the company seized the Santa Catarina, a 1,500-tonnes Portuguese merchant carrack, off the coast of the Malay Peninsula. That same year, a joint Dutch-English force captured another Portuguese carrack off Macau. The proceeds from the sale of the cargo of the two vessels was equivalent to more than 50% of the VOC's original subscription capital.

In 1603, the first permanent Dutch trading post in Indonesia was established in Banten, West Java. In 1611, another was established at Jayakarta (later "Batavia" and then "Jakarta"). In 1610, the VOC established the post of governor-general to more firmly control their affairs in Asia. To advise and control the risk of despotic governors-general, a Council of the Indies (Raad van Indië) was created. The governor-general effectively became the main administrator of the VOC's activities in Asia. The Heeren XVII, a body of 17 shareholders representing different chambers, continued to officially have overall control.

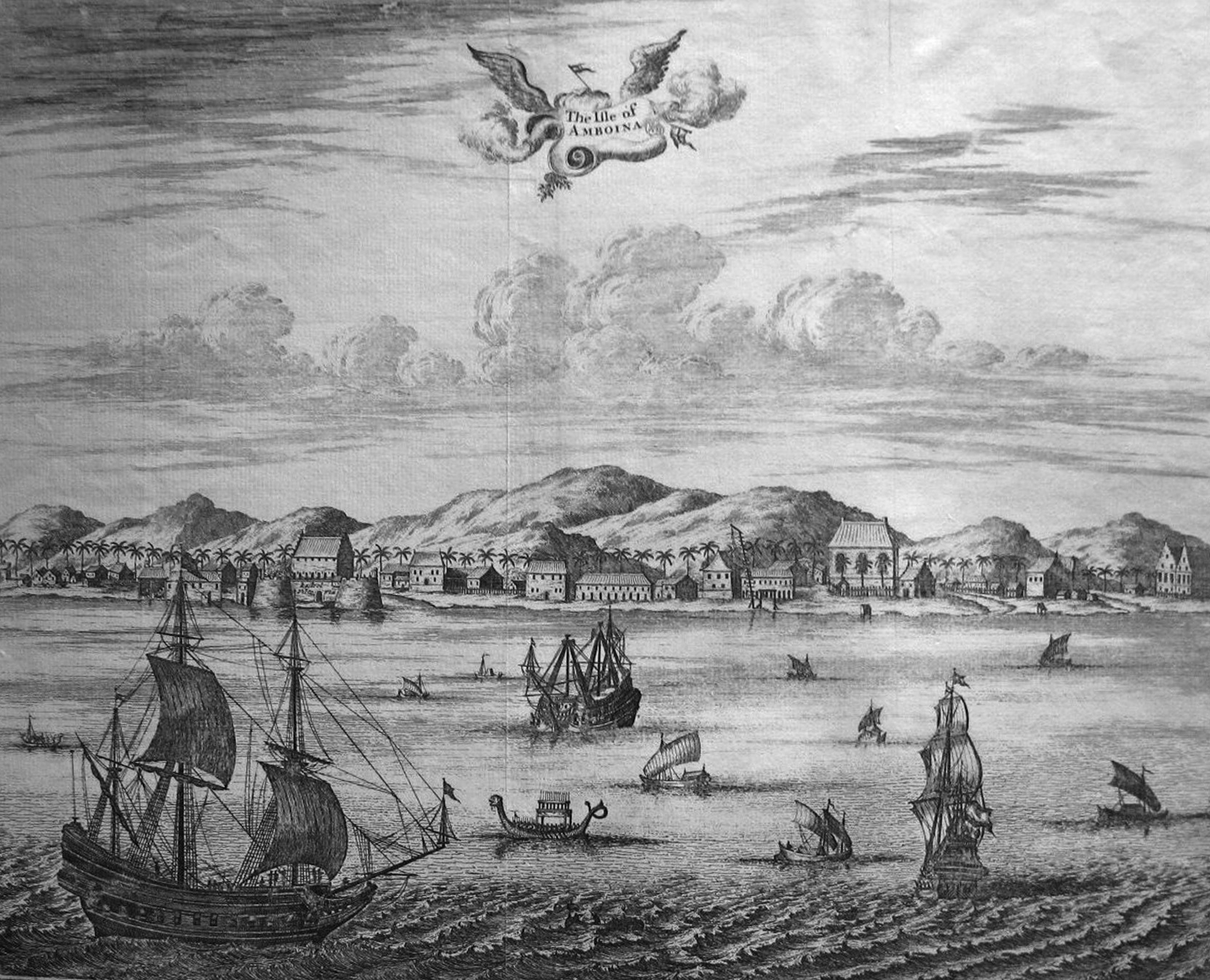
The Isle of Amboina, a 17th century print, probably English

The VOC headquarters were located in Ambon during the tenures of the first three governors-general (1610–1619), but it was not a satisfactory location. Although it was at the centre of the spice production areas, it was far from the Asian trade routes and other VOC areas of activity ranging from Africa to India to Japan. A location in the west of the archipelago was thus sought. The Straits of Malacca were strategic but became dangerous following the Portuguese conquest, and the first permanent VOC settlement in Banten was controlled by a powerful local ruler and subject to stiff competition from Chinese and English traders.

In 1604, a second English East India Company voyage commanded by Sir Henry Middleton reached the islands of Ternate, Tidore, Ambon and Banda. In Banda, they encountered severe VOC hostility, sparking Anglo-Dutch competition for access to spices. From 1611 to 1617, the English established trading posts at Sukadana (southwest Kalimantan), Makassar, Jayakarta and Jepara in Java, and Aceh, Pariaman and Jambi in Sumatra, which threatened Dutch ambitions for a monopoly on East Indies trade.

In 1620, diplomatic agreements in Europe ushered in a period of collaboration between the Dutch and English spice trades. This ended with the notorious Amboyna massacre, where ten Englishmen were arrested, tried and beheaded for conspiracy against the Dutch government. Although this caused outrage in Europe and a diplomatic crisis, the English quietly withdrew from most of their Indonesian activities, except trading in Banten, and focused on other Asian interests.

=== Growth ===
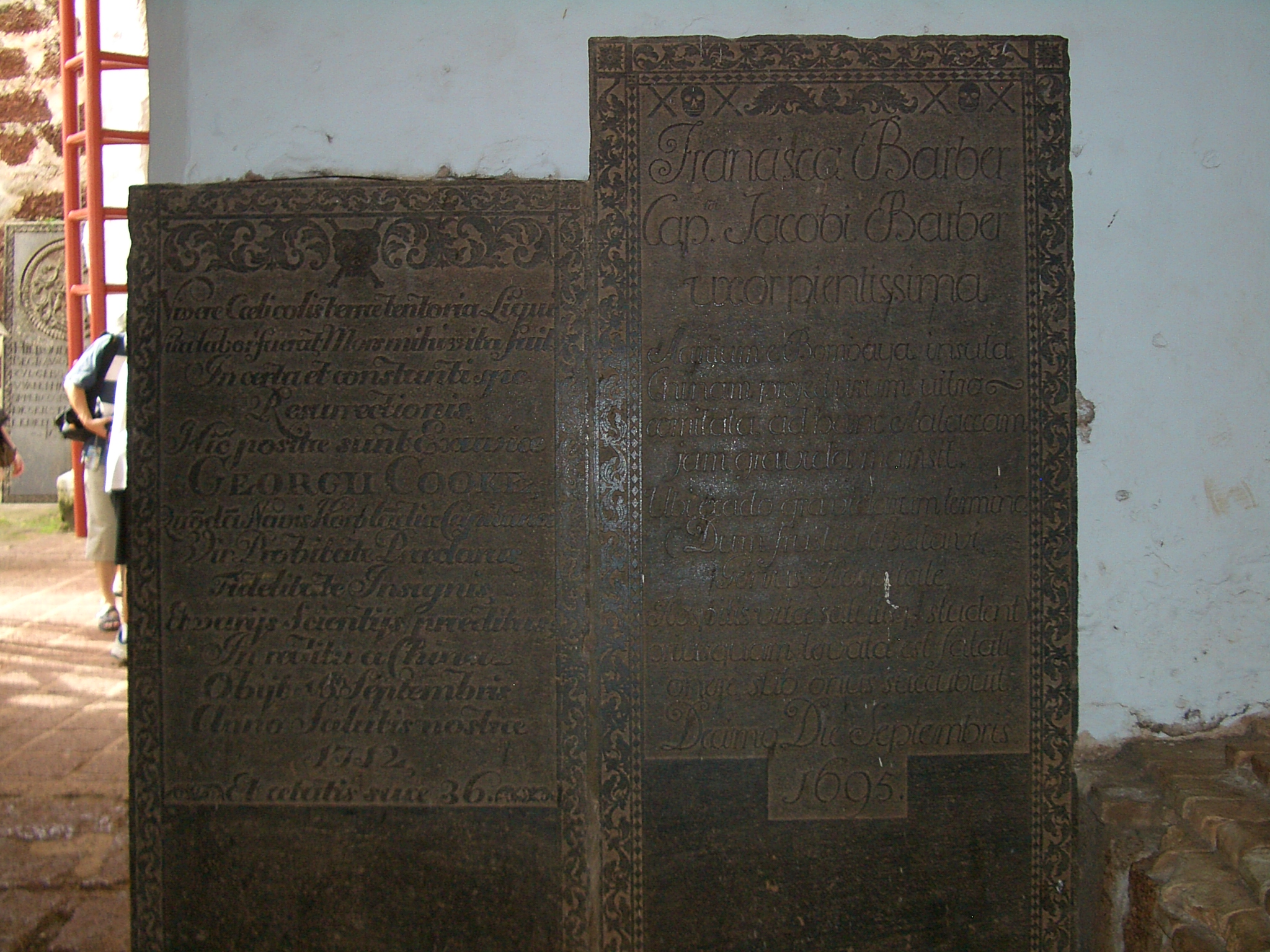
Graves of Dutch dignitaries in the ruined St. Paul's Church, Malacca, in the former Dutch Malacca

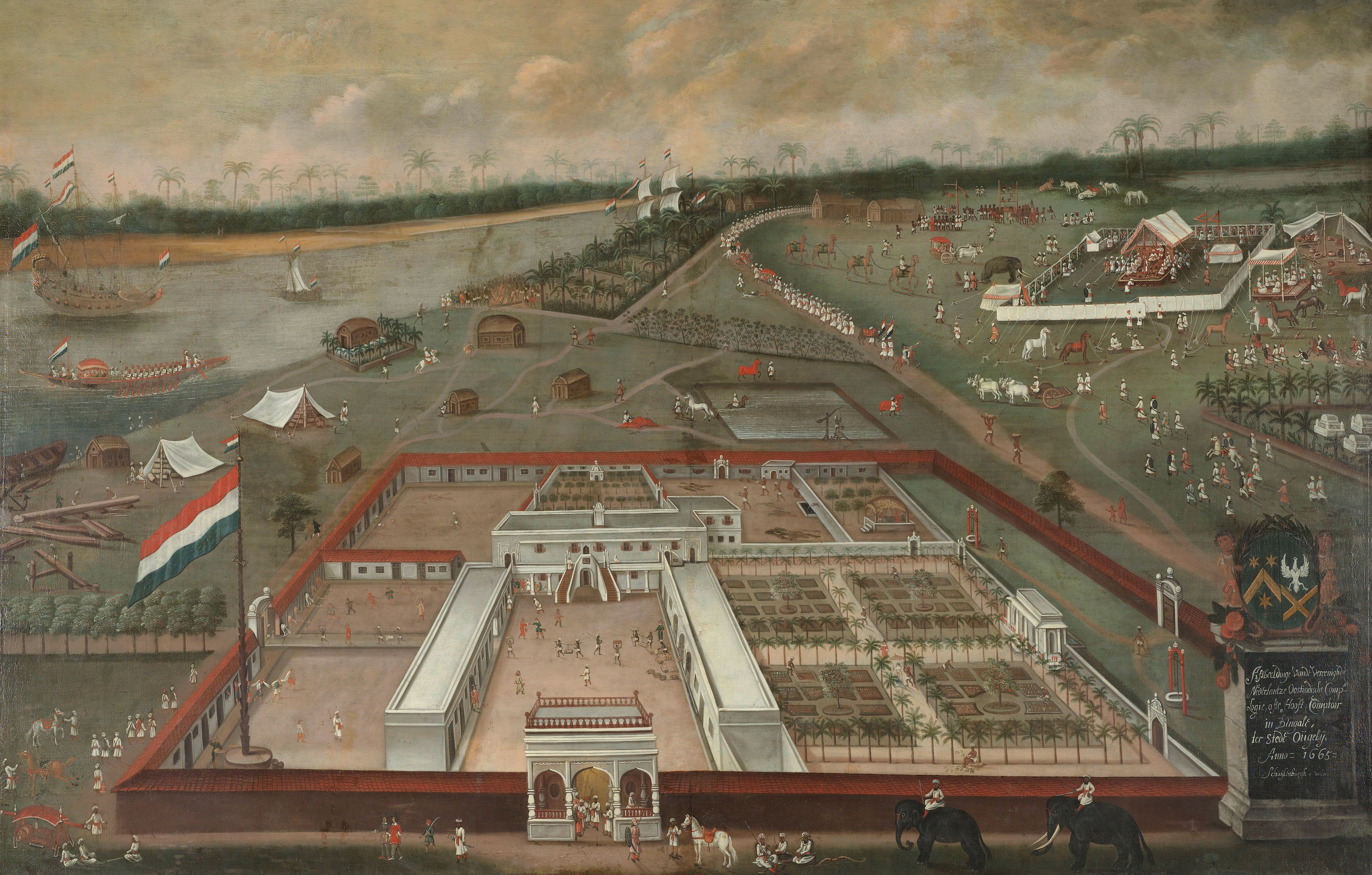
Dutch East India Company factory in Hugli-Chuchura, Mughal Bengal — Hendrik van Schuylenburgh (1665)

In 1619, Jan Pieterszoon Coen was appointed governor-general of the VOC. He saw the possibility of the VOC becoming an Asian power, both political and economic. On 30 May 1619, Coen, backed by a force of nineteen ships, stormed Jayakarta, driving out the Banten forces; and from the ashes established Batavia as the VOC headquarters. In the 1620s almost the entire native population of the Banda Islands was driven away, starved to death, or killed in an attempt to replace them with Dutch plantations. These plantations were used to grow nutmeg for export. Coen hoped to settle large numbers of Dutch colonists in the East Indies, but implementation of this policy never materialised, mainly because very few Dutch were willing to emigrate to Asia.

Another of Coen's ventures was more successful. A major problem in the European trade with Asia at the time was that the Europeans could offer few goods that Asian consumers wanted, except silver and gold. European traders therefore had to pay for spices with the precious metals, which were in short supply in Europe, except for Spain and Portugal. The Dutch and English had to obtain it by creating a trade surplus with other European countries. Coen discovered the obvious solution for the problem: to start an intra-Asiatic trade system, whose profits could be used to finance the spice trade with Europe. In the long run this obviated the need for exports of precious metals from Europe, though at first it required the formation of a large trading-capital fund in the Indies. The VOC reinvested a large share of its profits to this end in the period up to 1630.

The VOC traded throughout Asia, benefiting mainly from Bengal. Ships coming into Batavia from the Netherlands carried supplies for VOC settlements in Asia. Silver and copper from Japan were used to trade with the world's wealthiest empires, Mughal India and Qing China, for silk, cotton, porcelain, and textiles. These products were either traded within Asia for the coveted spices or brought back to Europe. The VOC was also instrumental in introducing European ideas and technology to Asia. The company supported Christian missionaries and traded modern technology with China and Japan. A more peaceful VOC trade post on Dejima, an artificial island off the coast of Nagasaki, was for more than two hundred years the only place where Europeans were permitted to trade with Japan. When the VOC tried to use military force to make Ming dynasty China open up to Dutch trade, the Chinese defeated the Dutch in a war over the Penghu islands from 1623 to 1624, forcing the VOC to abandon Penghu for Taiwan. The Chinese defeated the VOC again at the Battle of Liaoluo Bay in 1633.

The Vietnamese Nguyen lords defeated the VOC in a 1643 battle during the Trịnh–Nguyễn War, blowing up a Dutch ship. The Cambodians defeated the VOC in the Cambodian–Dutch War from 1643 to 1644 on the Mekong River.

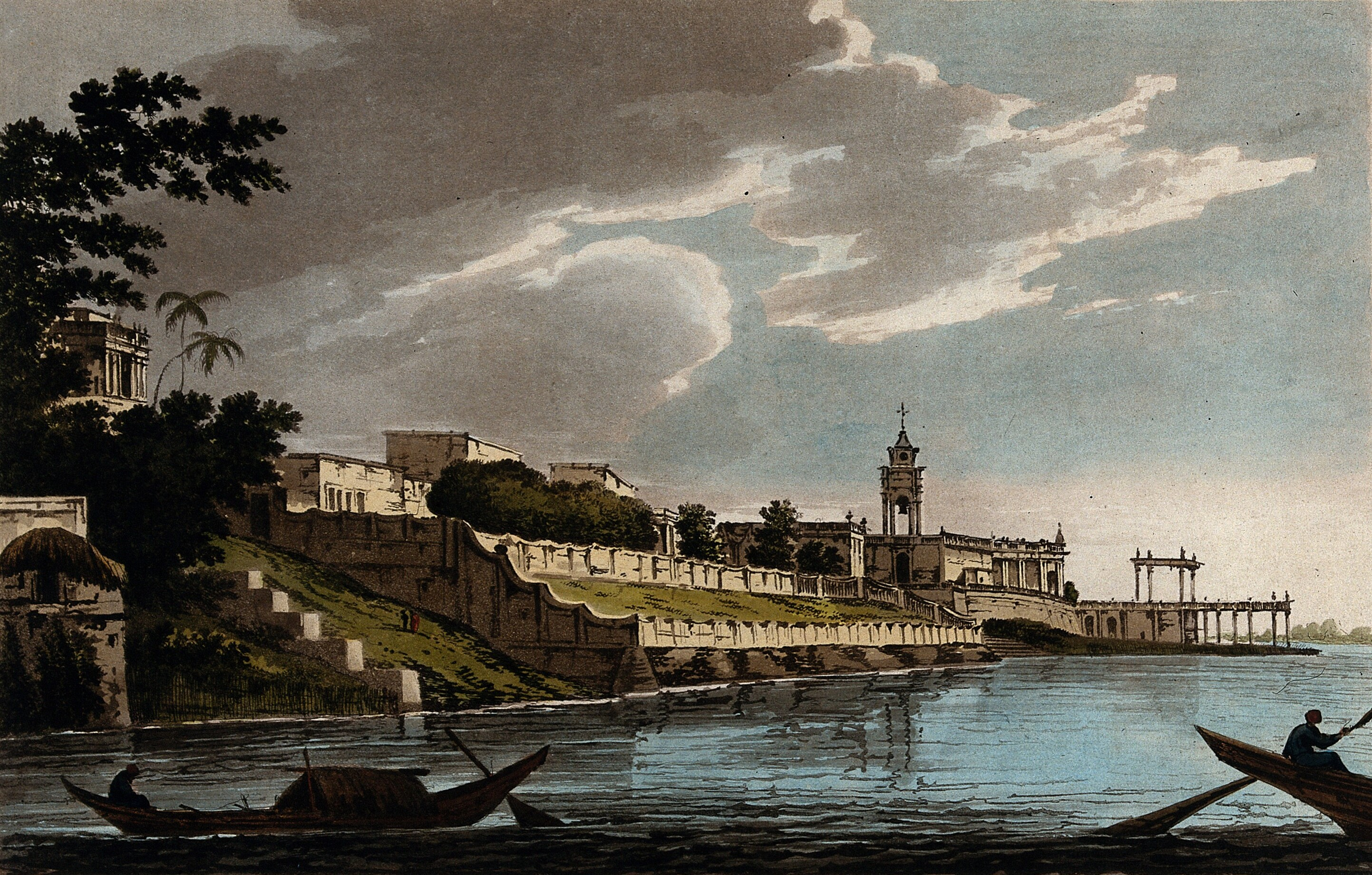
Dutch settlement in Bengal Subah

In 1640, the VOC obtained the port of Galle, Ceylon, from the Portuguese and broke the latter's monopoly of the cinnamon trade. In 1658, Gerard Pietersz Hulft laid siege to Colombo, which was captured with the help of King Rajasinghe II of Kandy. By 1659, the Portuguese had been expelled from the coastal regions, which were then occupied by the VOC, securing for it the monopoly over cinnamon. To prevent the Portuguese or the English from ever recapturing Sri Lanka, the VOC went on to conquer the entire Malabar Coast from the Portuguese, almost entirely driving them from the west coast of India.

In 1652, Jan van Riebeeck established a resupply outpost at the Cape of Storms (the southwestern tip of Africa, now Cape Town, South Africa) to service company ships on their journey to and from East Asia. The cape was later renamed Cape of Good Hope in honour of the outpost's presence. Although non-company ships were welcome to use the station, they were charged exorbitantly. This post later became a full-fledged colony, the Cape Colony, when more Dutch and other Europeans started to settle there.

Through the seventeenth century VOC trading posts were also established in Persia, Bengal, Malacca, Siam, Formosa (now Taiwan), as well as the Malabar and Coromandel coasts in India. Direct access to mainland China came in 1729 when a factory was established in Canton. In 1661, Ming general Koxinga led a fleet to defeat the Dutch. After Koxinga's Ming loyalists defeated Dutch reinforcements from Java in 1662, Frederick Coyett, the Dutch commander, surrendered Taiwan. (see History of Taiwan).

In 1663, the VOC signed the "Painan Treaty" with several local lords in the Painan area that were revolting against the Aceh Sultanate. The treaty allowed the VOC to build a trading post in the area and eventually to monopolise the trade there, especially the gold trade.

By 1669, the VOC was the richest private company the world had ever seen, with over 150 merchant ships, 40 warships, 50,000 employees, a private army of 10,000 soldiers, and a dividend payment of 40% on the original investment. (Note: The share price had appreciated significantly, so in that respect the dividend was less impressive.)

Many of the VOC employees inter-mixed with the indigenous peoples and expanded the population of Indos in pre-colonial history.

=== Reorientation ===
Around 1670, two events caused the growth of VOC trade to stall. In the first place, the highly profitable trade with Japan started to decline. The loss of the outpost on Formosa to Koxinga in the 1662 siege of Fort Zeelandia and related internal turmoil in China (where the Ming dynasty was being replaced with the China's Qing dynasty) brought an end to the silk trade after 1666. Though the VOC substituted Mughal Bengal's for Chinese silk, other forces affected the supply of Japanese silver and gold. The shogunate enacted a number of measures to limit the export of these precious metals, in the process limiting VOC opportunities for trade, and severely worsening the terms of trade. Therefore, Japan ceased to function as the linchpin of the intra-Asiatic trade of the VOC by 1685.

Even more importantly, the Third Anglo-Dutch War temporarily interrupted VOC trade with Europe. This caused a spike in the price of pepper, which enticed the English East India Company (EIC) to enter this market aggressively in the years after 1672. Previously, one of the tenets of the VOC pricing policy was to slightly over-supply the pepper market, so as to depress prices below the level where interlopers were encouraged to enter the market (instead of striving for short-term profit maximisation). The wisdom of such a policy was illustrated when a fierce price war with the EIC ensued, as that company flooded the market with new supplies from India. In this struggle for market share, the VOC (which had much larger financial resources) could wait out the EIC. Indeed, by 1683, the latter came close to bankruptcy; its share price plummeted from 600 to 250; and its president Josiah Child was temporarily forced from office.

However, the writing was on the wall. Other companies, like the French East India Company and the Danish East India Company also started to make inroads on the Dutch system. The VOC therefore closed the theretofore flourishing open pepper emporium of Bantam by a treaty of 1684 with the Sultan. Also, on the Coromandel Coast, it moved its chief stronghold from Pulicat to Nagapattinam, so as to secure a monopoly on the pepper trade to the detriment of the French and the Danes. (Note: During the Nine Years' War, the French and Dutch companies came to blows on the Indian Subcontinent. The French sent naval expeditions from metropolitan France, which the VOC easily countered. On the other hand, the VOC conquered the important fortress of Pondicherry after a siege of only 16 days by an expedition of 3,000 men and 19 ships under Laurens Pit from Nagapattinam in September 1693. The Dutch then made the defenses of the fortress impregnable, which they came to regret when the Dutch government returned it to the French by the Peace of Ryswick in exchange for tariff concessions in Europe by the French.) However, the importance of these traditional commodities in the Asian-European trade was diminishing rapidly at the time. The military outlays that the VOC needed to make to enhance its monopoly were not justified by the increased profits of this declining trade.

Nevertheless, this lesson was slow to sink in and at first the VOC made the strategic decision to improve its military position on the Malabar Coast (hoping thereby to curtail English influence in the area, and end the drain on its resources from the cost of the Malabar garrisons) by using force to compel the Zamorin of Calicut to submit to Dutch domination. In 1710, the Zamorin was made to sign a treaty with the VOC undertaking to trade exclusively with the VOC and expel other European traders. For a brief time, this appeared to improve the company's prospects. However, in 1715, with EIC encouragement, the Zamorin renounced the treaty. Though a Dutch army managed to suppress this insurrection temporarily, the Zamorin continued to trade with the English and the French, which led to an appreciable upsurge in English and French traffic. The VOC decided in 1721 that it was no longer worth the trouble to try to dominate the Malabar pepper and spice trade. A strategic decision was taken to scale down the Dutch military presence and in effect yield the area to EIC influence.

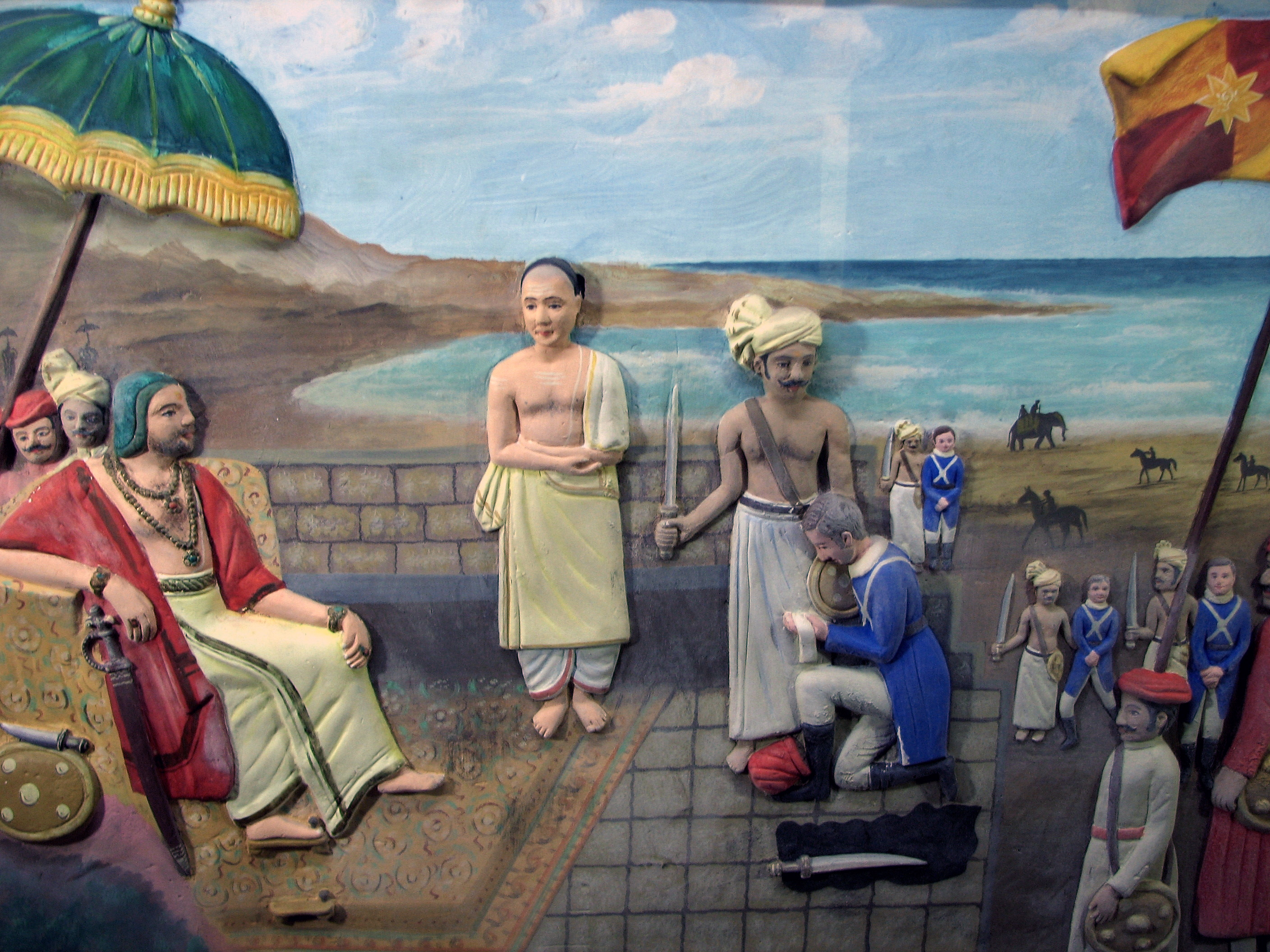
Eustachius De Lannoy of the Dutch East India Company surrenders to Maharaja Marthanda Varma of the Indian Kingdom of Travancore after the Battle of Colachel (depiction at Padmanabhapuram Palace).

In the 1741 Battle of Colachel, warriors of Travancore under Raja Marthanda Varma defeated the Dutch. The Dutch commander Captain Eustachius De Lannoy was captured. Marthanda Varma agreed to spare the Dutch captain's life on condition that he joined his army and trained his soldiers on modern lines. This defeat in the Travancore–Dutch War is considered the earliest example of an organised Asian power overcoming European military technology and tactics; and it signalled the decline of Dutch power in India. (Note: However, the VOC had been defeated many times before. On the Indian subcontinent, the EIC had suffered a resounding defeat in its war against the Mughals.)

The attempt to continue as before as a low volume-high profit business enterprise with its core business in the spice trade had therefore failed. The company had however already (reluctantly) followed the example of its European competitors in diversifying into other Asian commodities, like tea, coffee, cotton, textiles, and sugar. These commodities provided a lower profit margin and therefore required a larger sales volume to generate the same amount of revenue. This structural change in the commodity composition of the VOC's trade started in the early 1680s, after the temporary collapse of the EIC around 1683 offered an excellent opportunity to enter these markets. The actual cause for the change lies, however, in two structural features of this new era.

In the first place, there was a revolutionary change in the tastes affecting European demand for Asian textiles, coffee and tea, around the turn of the 18th century. Secondly, a new era of an abundant supply of capital at low interest rates suddenly opened around this time. The second factor enabled the company easily to finance its expansion in the new areas of commerce. (Note: It was also helpful that the price war with the EIC in the early decade had caused the accumulation of enormous inventories of pepper and spices, which enabled the VOC to cut down on shipments later on, thereby freeing up capital to increase shipments of other goods.) Between the 1680s and 1720s, the VOC was therefore able to equip and man an appreciable expansion of its fleet, and acquire a large amount of precious metals to finance the purchase of large amounts of Asian commodities, for shipment to Europe. The overall effect was approximately to double the size of the company.

The tonnage of the returning ships rose by 125% in this period. However, the company's revenues from the sale of goods landed in Europe rose by only 78%. This reflects the basic change in the VOC's circumstances that had occurred: it now operated in new markets for goods with an elastic demand, in which it had to compete on an equal footing with other suppliers. This made for low profit margins. The business information systems of the time made this difficult to discern for the managers of the company, which may partly explain the mistakes they made from hindsight. This lack of information might have been counteracted (as in earlier times in the VOC's history) by the business acumen of the directors. By this time these were almost exclusively recruited from the political regent class, which had long since lost its close relationship with merchant circles.

Low profit margins in themselves do not explain the deterioration of revenues. To a large extent the costs of the operation of the VOC had a "fixed" character (military establishments; maintenance of the fleet and such). Profit levels might therefore have been maintained if the increase in the scale of trading operations that in fact took place had resulted in economies of scale. However, though larger ships transported the growing volume of goods, labour productivity did not go up sufficiently to realise these. In general the company's overhead rose in step with the growth in trade volume; declining gross margins translated directly into a decline in profitability of the invested capital. The era of expansion was one of "profitless growth".

Specifically: "[t]he long-term average annual profit in the VOC's 1630–70 'Golden Age' was ƒ2.1 M (±€53 M in 2024), of which just under half was distributed as dividends and the remainder reinvested. The long-term average annual profit in the 'Expansion Age' (1680–1730) was ƒ2.0 M (±€55 M in 2024), of which three-quarters was distributed as dividend and one-quarter reinvested. In the earlier period, profits averaged 18% of total revenues; in the latter period, 10%. The annual return of invested capital in the earlier period stood at approximately 6%; in the latter period, 3.4%."

Nevertheless, in the eyes of investors the VOC did not do too badly. The share price hovered consistently around the 400 mark from the mid-1680s (excepting a hiccup around the Glorious Revolution in 1688), and they reached an all-time high of around 642 in the 1720s. VOC shares then yielded a return of 3.5%, only slightly less than the yield on Dutch government bonds.

=== Decline and fall ===
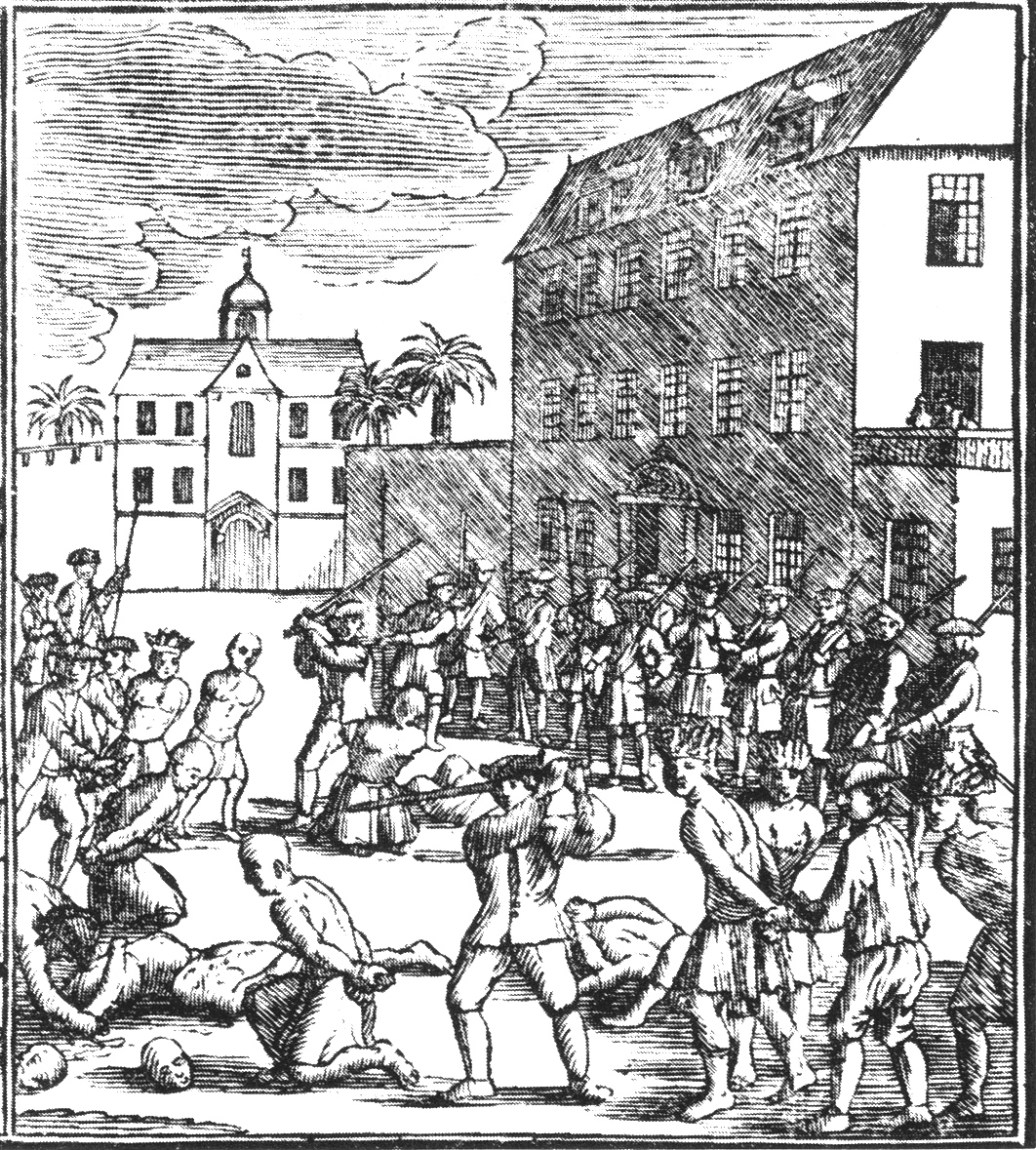
A print of the 1740 Batavia massacre

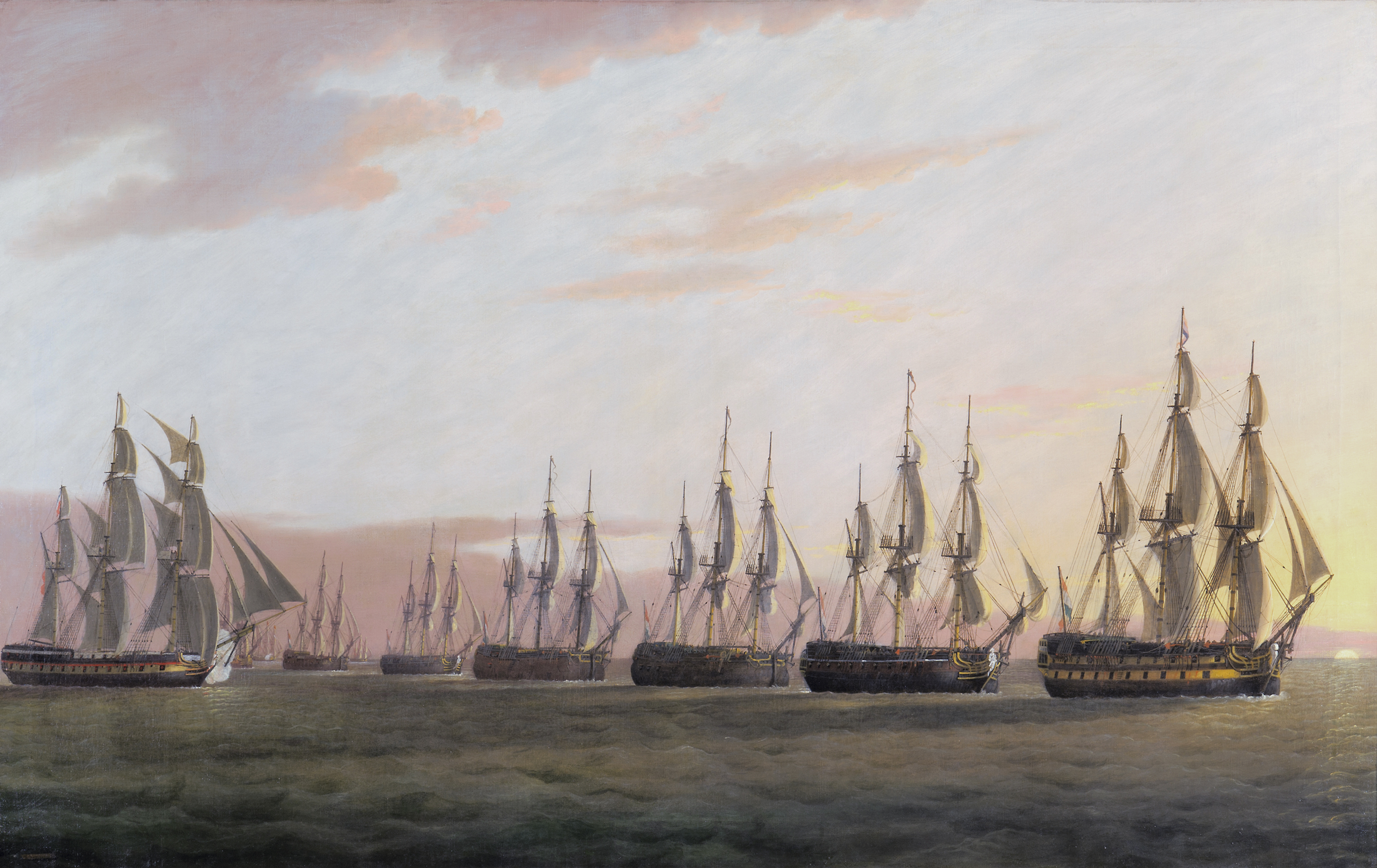
The British East Indiaman General Goddard attacking seven VOC East Indiamen on 14 June 1795

After 1730, the fortunes of the VOC started to decline. Five major contributing factors are attributed to its decay in the 50 years between 1730 and 1780:

- There was a steady erosion of intra-Asiatic trade because of changes in the Asiatic political and economic environment that the VOC could do little about. These factors gradually squeezed the company out of Persia, Suratte, the Malabar Coast, and Bengal. The company had to confine its operations to the belt it physically controlled, from Ceylon through the Indonesian archipelago. The volume of this intra-Asiatic trade, and its profitability, therefore had to shrink.
- The way the company was organised in Asia (centralised on its hub in Batavia), which initially had offered advantages in gathering market information, began to cause disadvantages in the 18th century because of the inefficiency of first shipping everything to this central point. This disadvantage was most keenly felt in the tea trade, where competitors like the EIC and the Ostend Company shipped directly from China to Europe.
- The "venality" of the VOC's personnel (in the sense of corruption and non-performance of duties), though a problem for all East India Companies at the time, seems to have plagued the VOC on a larger scale than its competitors. To be sure, the company was not a "good employer". Salaries were low, and "private-account trading" was officially not allowed. It proliferated in the 18th century to the detriment of the company's performance. (Note: A particularly egregious example was that of the "Amfioen Society". This was a business of higher VOC-employees that received a monopoly of the opium trade on Java, at a time when the VOC had to pay monopoly prices to the EIC to buy the opium in Bengal.) From about the 1790s onward, the phrase perished under corruption (vergaan onder corruptie, also abbreviated VOC in Dutch) came to summarise the company's future.
- A problem that the VOC shared with other companies was the high mortality and morbidity rates among its employees. This decimated the company's ranks and enervated many of the survivors.
- A further issue was caused by the VOC's dividend policy. The dividends distributed by the company had exceeded the surplus it garnered in Europe in every decade from 1690 to 1760 except 1710–1720. However, in the period up to 1730 the directors shipped resources to Asia to build up the trading capital there. Consolidated bookkeeping therefore probably would have shown that total profits exceeded dividends. In addition, between 1700 and 1740 the company retired ƒ5.4 M (±€152 M in 2024) of long-term debt. The company therefore was still on a secure financial footing in these years. This changed after 1730. While profits plummeted the bewindhebbers only slightly decreased dividends from the earlier level. Distributed dividends were therefore in excess of earnings in every decade but one (1760–1770). To accomplish this, the Asian capital stock had to be drawn down by ƒ4 M between 1730 and 1780, and the liquid capital available in Europe was reduced by ƒ20 M in the same period. The directors were therefore constrained to replenish the company's liquidity by resorting to short-term financing from anticipatory loans, backed by expected revenues from home-bound fleets.

Colombo in Dutch Ceylon, under VOC rule, c. 1750

Despite these problems, the VOC in 1780 remained an enormous operation. Its capital in the Republic, consisting of ships and goods in inventory, totalled ƒ28 M (±€757 M in 2024); its capital in Asia, consisting of the liquid trading fund and goods en route to Europe, totalled ƒ46 M (±€1,244 M in 2024). Total capital, net of outstanding debt, stood at ƒ62 M (±€1,677 M in 2024). The prospects of the company at this time therefore were not hopeless, had one of the plans for reform been undertaken successfully. In 1780, the Fourth Anglo-Dutch War broke out, with wartime British attacks on the Dutch East India Company reducing the VOC's fleet by half and severely weakening its position in Asia. As a result of the war, the VOC suffered damages of up to ƒ43 M (±€1,163 M in 2024). Loans to keep the company operating reduced its net assets to zero.

From 1720 on, the market for sugar from Indonesia declined as the competition from cheap sugar from Brazil increased. European markets became saturated. Dozens of Chinese sugar traders went bankrupt, which led to massive unemployment, which in turn led to gangs of unemployed coolies. The Dutch government in Batavia did not adequately respond to these problems. In 1740, rumours of deportation of the gangs from the Batavia area led to widespread rioting. The Dutch military searched houses of Chinese in Batavia for weapons. When a house accidentally burnt down, military and impoverished citizens started slaughtering and pillaging the Chinese community. This massacre of the Chinese was deemed sufficiently serious for the board of the VOC to start an official investigation into the Government of the Dutch East Indies for the first time in its history.

Following the end of the Fourth Anglo-Dutch War in 1783, the VOC's financial issues worsened considerably. After vain attempts at reorganisation by the provincial States of Holland and Zeeland, the board of directors in the VOC were sacked in 1796 and the company's management was handed over to a Committee for Affairs relating to East India Trade and Possessions (Dutch: Comité tot de zaken van de Oost-Indische handel en bezittingen). The outbreak of the French Revolutionary Wars sealed the fate of the VOC, as the fall of the Dutch Republic and its replacement by the Batavian Republic in 1795 led the Dutch and British to now be at war. British attacks on VOC shipping and colonies led to more losses, and though the VOC charter was renewed several times it was allowed to expire on 31 December 1799, nationalising the company.

== Organisational structure ==
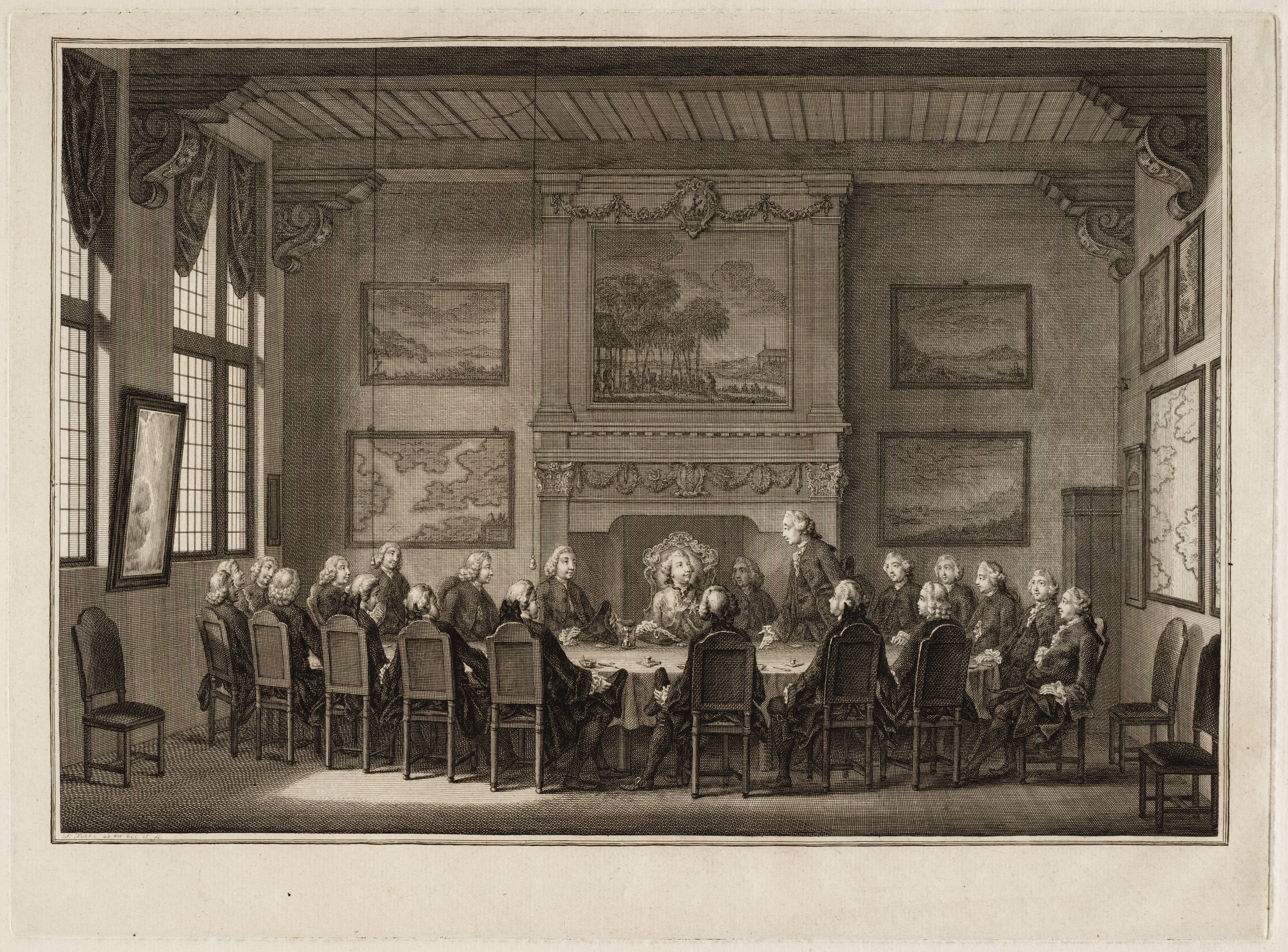
The Lords Seventeen, in the Directors' Room at the East India House, Amsterdam

While the VOC mainly operated in what later became the Dutch East Indies (modern-day Indonesia), the company also had important operations elsewhere. It employed people from different continents and origins in the same functions and working environments. Although it was a Dutch company, its employees included not only people from the Netherlands, but also many from Germany and other countries. Besides the diverse north-west European workforce recruited by the VOC in the Dutch Republic, the VOC made extensive use of local Asian labour markets. As a result, the personnel of the various VOC offices in Asia consisted of European and Asian employees. Asian or Eurasian workers could be employed as sailors, soldiers, writers, carpenters, smiths, or as simple unskilled workers. At the height of its existence, the VOC had 25,000 employees who worked in Asia and 11,000 who were en route. Also, while most of its shareholders were Dutch, about a quarter of the initial shareholders were Zuid-Nederlanders (people from an area that includes modern Belgium and Luxembourg), and there were also a few dozen Germans.

The VOC had two types of shareholders: the participanten, who could be seen as non-managing members, and the 76 bewindhebbers (later reduced to 60) who acted as managing directors. This was the usual set-up for Dutch joint-stock companies at the time. The innovation in the case of the VOC was that the liability of not just the participanten but also of the bewindhebbers was limited to the paid-in capital (usually, bewindhebbers had unlimited liability). The VOC therefore was a limited liability company. Also, the capital would be permanent during the lifetime of the company. As a consequence, investors that wished to liquidate their interest in the interim could only do this by selling their share to others on the Amsterdam Stock Exchange. Confusion of confusions, a 1688 dialogue by the Sephardi Jew Joseph de la Vega analysed the workings of this one-stock exchange.

The VOC consisted of six Chambers (Kamers) in port cities: Amsterdam, Delft, Rotterdam, Enkhuizen, Middelburg, and Hoorn. Delegates of these chambers convened as the Heeren XVII (Lords or Gentlemen Seventeen). They were selected from the bewindhebber-class of shareholders.

Of the Heeren XVII, eight delegates were from the Chamber of Amsterdam (one short of a majority on its own), four from the Chamber of Zeeland, and one from each of the smaller Chambers, while the seventeenth seat was alternatively from the Chamber of Middelburg-Zeeland or rotated among the five small Chambers. Amsterdam had thereby the decisive voice. The Zeelanders in particular had misgivings about this arrangement at the beginning. The fear was not unfounded, because in practice it meant Amsterdam stipulated what happened.

The six chambers raised the start-up capital of the Dutch East India Company:

Chamber	Capital	
Chamber	Guilders (ƒ)	± Euro (€) eq. in 2024
Amsterdam	3,679,915	151 M
Middelburg	1,300,405	53 M
Enkhuizen	540,000	22 M
Delft	469,400	19 M
Hoorn	266,868	11 M
Rotterdam	173,000	7 M
Total:	6,424,588	264 M

The raising of capital in Rotterdam did not go so smoothly. A considerable part originated from inhabitants of Dordrecht. Although it did not raise as much capital as Amsterdam or Middelburg-Zeeland, Enkhuizen had the largest input in the share capital of the VOC. Under the first 358 shareholders, there were many small entrepreneurs, who dared to take the risk. The minimum investment in the VOC was ƒ3,000, which priced the company's stock within the means of many merchants.

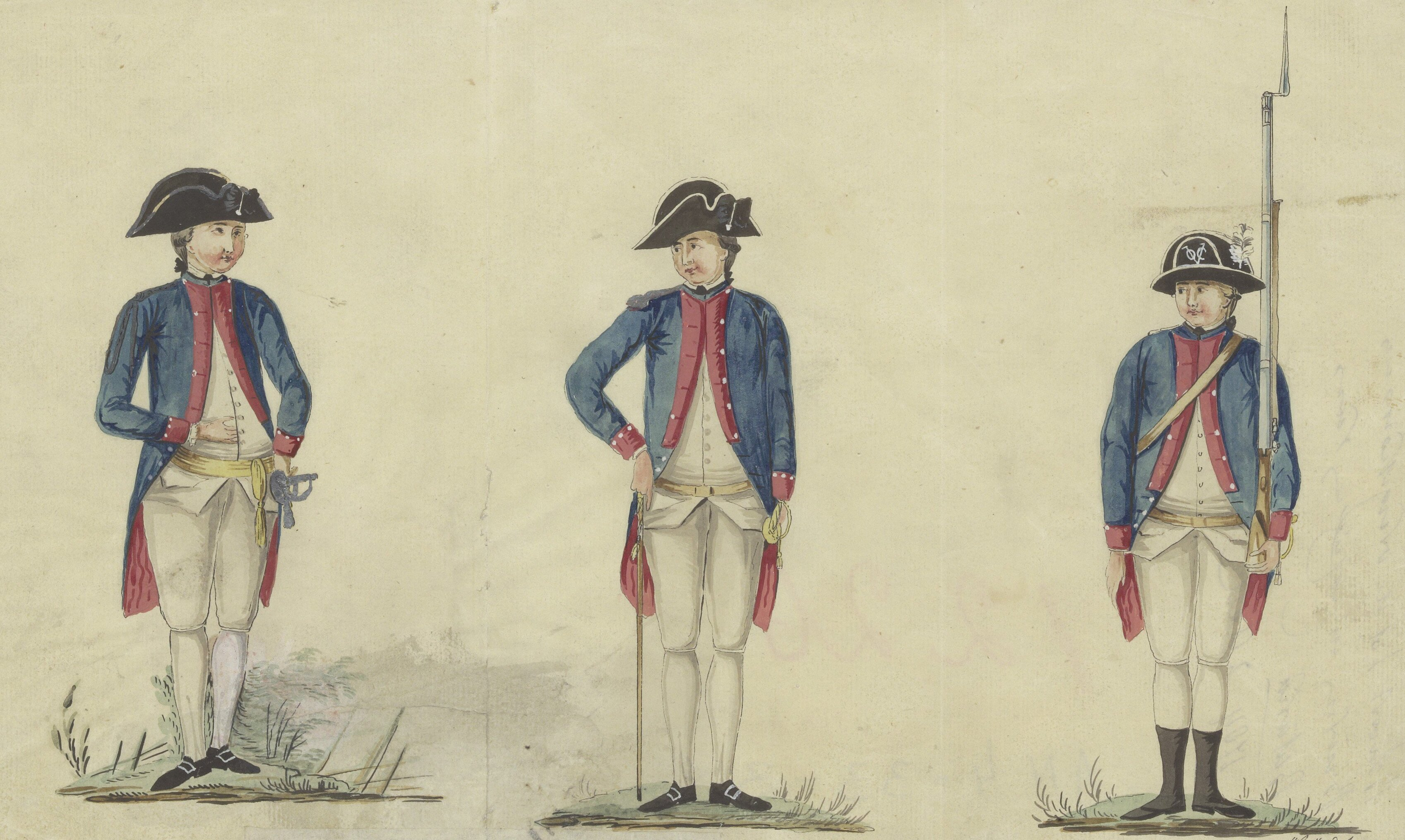
c. 1783 illustration of three VOC soldiers in the Dutch East Indies

Among the early shareholders of the VOC, immigrants played an important role. Under the 1,143 tenderers were 39 Germans and 301 from the Southern Netherlands (roughly present Belgium and Luxembourg, then under Habsburg rule), of whom Isaac le Maire was the largest subscriber with ƒ85,000. The Heeren XVII (Lords Seventeen) met alternately six years in Amsterdam and two years in Middelburg-Zeeland. They defined the VOC's general policy and divided the tasks among the Chambers. The Chambers carried out all the necessary work, built their own ships and warehouses and traded the merchandise. The Heeren XVII sent the ships' masters off with extensive instructions on the route to be navigated, prevailing winds, currents, shoals and landmarks. The VOC also produced its own charts.

In the context of the Dutch–Portuguese War the company established its headquarters in Batavia, Java (now Jakarta, Indonesia). Other colonial outposts were also established in the East Indies, such as on the Maluku Islands, which include the Banda Islands, where the VOC forcibly maintained a monopoly over nutmeg and mace. Methods used to maintain the monopoly involved extortion and the violent suppression of the native population, including mass murder. In addition, VOC representatives sometimes used the tactic of burning spice trees to force indigenous populations to grow other crops, thus artificially cutting the supply of spices like nutmeg and cloves.

== Shareholder activism and governance issues ==
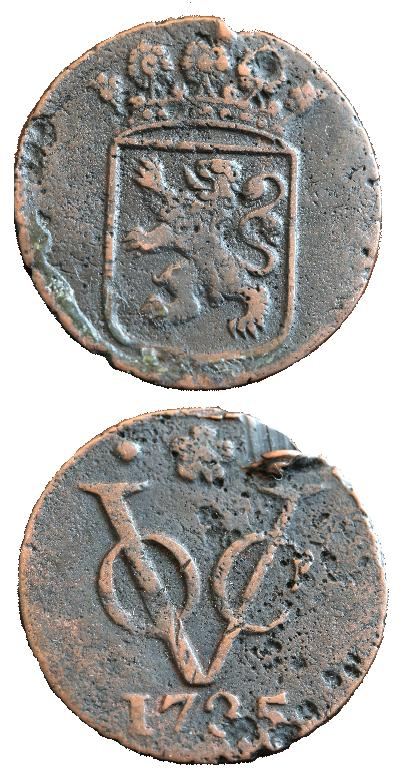
Both sides of a duit, a coin minted in 1735 by the VOC

The seventeenth-century Dutch businessmen, especially the VOC investors, were possibly history's first recorded investors to seriously consider the problems of corporate governance. Isaac Le Maire, who is known as history's first recorded short seller, was also a sizeable shareholder of the VOC. In 1609, he complained of the VOC's poor corporate governance. On 24 January 1609, Le Maire filed a petition against the VOC, marking the first recorded expression of shareholder activism. In what is the first recorded corporate governance dispute, Le Maire formally charged that the VOC's board of directors (the Heeren XVII) sought to "retain another's money for longer or use it ways other than the latter wishes" and petitioned for the liquidation of the VOC in accordance with standard business practice. Initially the largest single shareholder in the VOC and a bewindhebber sitting on the board of governors, Le Maire apparently attempted to divert the firm's profits to himself by undertaking 14 expeditions under his own accounts instead of those of the company. Since his large shareholdings were not accompanied by greater voting power, Le Maire was soon ousted by other governors in 1605 on charges of embezzlement, and was forced to sign an agreement not to compete with the VOC. Having retained stock in the company following this incident, in 1609 Le Maire would become the author of what is celebrated as "first recorded expression of shareholder advocacy at a publicly traded company".

In 1622, the history's first recorded shareholder revolt also happened among the VOC investors who complained that the company account books had been "smeared with bacon" so that they might be "eaten by dogs". The investors demanded a "reeckeninge", a proper financial audit. The 1622 campaign by the shareholders of the VOC is a testimony of genesis of corporate social responsibility (CSR) in which shareholders staged protests by distributing pamphlets and complaining about management self enrichment and secrecy.

== Main trading posts, settlements, and colonies ==
The company's global headquarters were in Amsterdam, with other posts in the Dutch cities of Delft, Enkhuizen, Hoorn, Middelburg and Rotterdam. In Africa, the trading posts and colonies were in Dutch Mauritius in 1638–1658 and 1664–1710, and in the Dutch Cape Colony between 1652 and 1806. The South Asian and Indonesian posts and colonies of the company were in Batavia, Dutch East Indies, Dutch Coromandel in 1806–1825, Dutch Suratte in 1616–1825, Dutch Bengal from 1827 to 1825, Dutch Ceylon from 1640 to 1796, and Dutch Malabar from 1661 to 1795.

The Japanese post was in Hirado, Nagasaki from 1609 to 1641, but was relocated to Dejima from 1641 to 1853. In Taiwan, the company had bases in Anping (Fort Zeelandia), Tainan (Fort Provincia), Wang-an, Penghu on the Pescadores Islands (Fort Vlissingen; 1620–1624), Keelung (Fort Noord-Holland and Fort Victoria) and Tamsui (Fort Antonio).

In Malaysia, the company was based in Dutch Malacca in 1641–1795 and 1818–1825. In Thailand, the company was based in Ayutthaya in 1608–1767. In Vietnam, the company was based in Hanoi/Tonkin in 1636–1699, and in Hội An in 1636–1741.

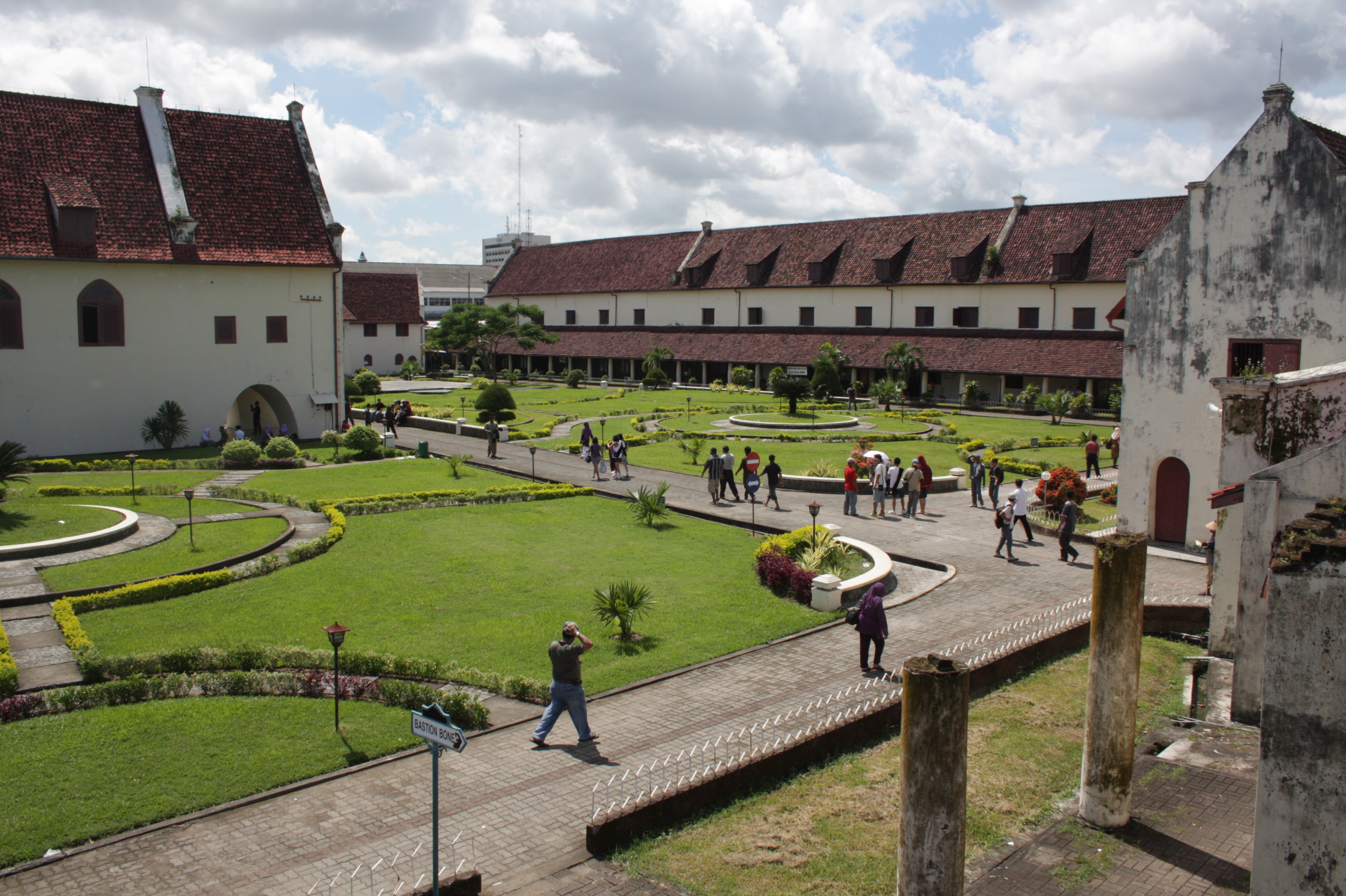
Fort Rotterdam in Makassar, built by the VOC in 1673

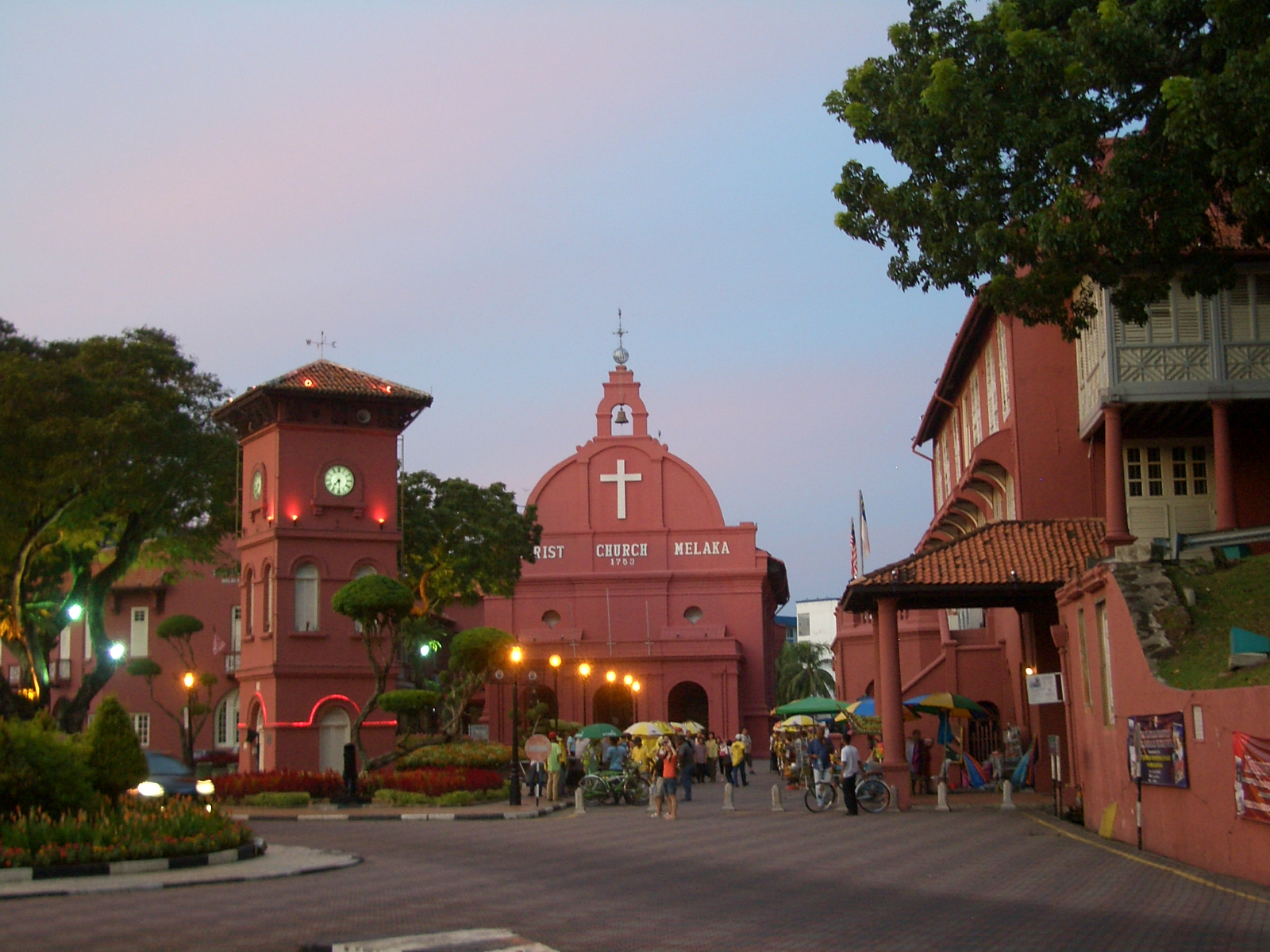
The Dutch Square in Malacca, with Christ Church (centre) and the Stadthuys (right)

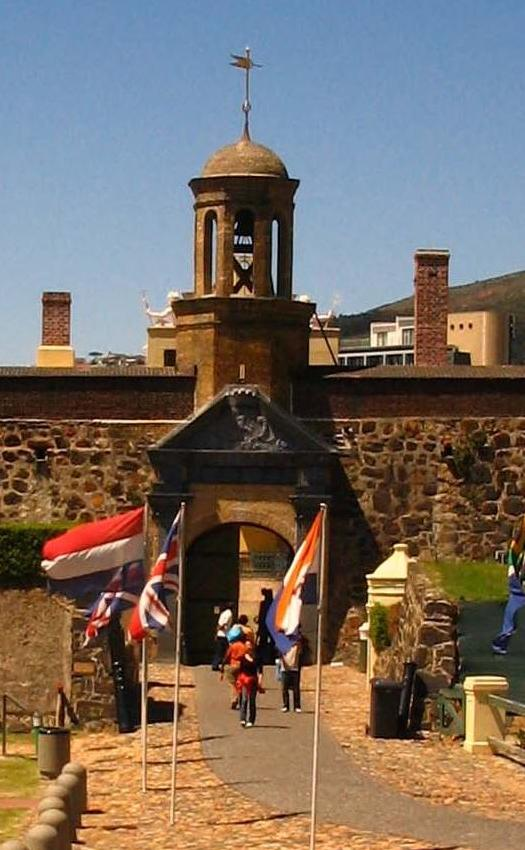
The gateway to the Castle of Good Hope, a bastion fort built by the VOC in the 17th century

== VOC mentality ==
(...) I don't understand why you're all being so negative and unpleasant. Let's just be happy with each other. Let's just say "the Netherlands can do it" again: that VOC mentality. Look across our borders. Dynamism! Don't you think?

— Jan Pieter Balkenende, then Dutch Prime Minister, reacted to the criticism of his government policy during the parliamentary debate, September 2006 (Note: Jan Peter Balkenende: "Ik begrijp niet waarom u er zo negatief en vervelend over doet. Laten we blij zijn met elkaar. Laten we zeggen: 'Nederland kan het weer!', die VOC-mentaliteit. Over grenzen heen kijken! Dynamiek! Toch?" [Original in Dutch, loosely translated from footage])

The VOC's history (and especially its dark side) has always been a potential source of controversy. In 2006 when the Dutch Prime Minister Jan Pieter Balkenende referred to the pioneering entrepreneurial spirit and work ethics of the Dutch people and Dutch Republic in their Golden Age, he coined the term "VOC mentality" (VOC-mentaliteit in Dutch). (Note: Balkenende: "Let us be optimistic! Let us say, 'It is possible again in The Netherlands!' That VOC mentality: looking across borders with dynamism!" [translated from the original text in Dutch].)

For Balkenende, the VOC represented Dutch business acumen, entrepreneurship, adventurous spirit, and decisiveness. However, it unleashed a wave of criticism, since such romantic views about the Dutch Golden Age ignores the inherent historical associations with colonialism, exploitation and violence. Balkenende later stressed that "it had not been his intention to refer to that at all". But in spite of criticisms, the "VOC-mentality", as a characteristic of the selective historical perspective on the Dutch Golden Age, has been considered a key feature of Dutch cultural policy for many years.

== Criticism ==
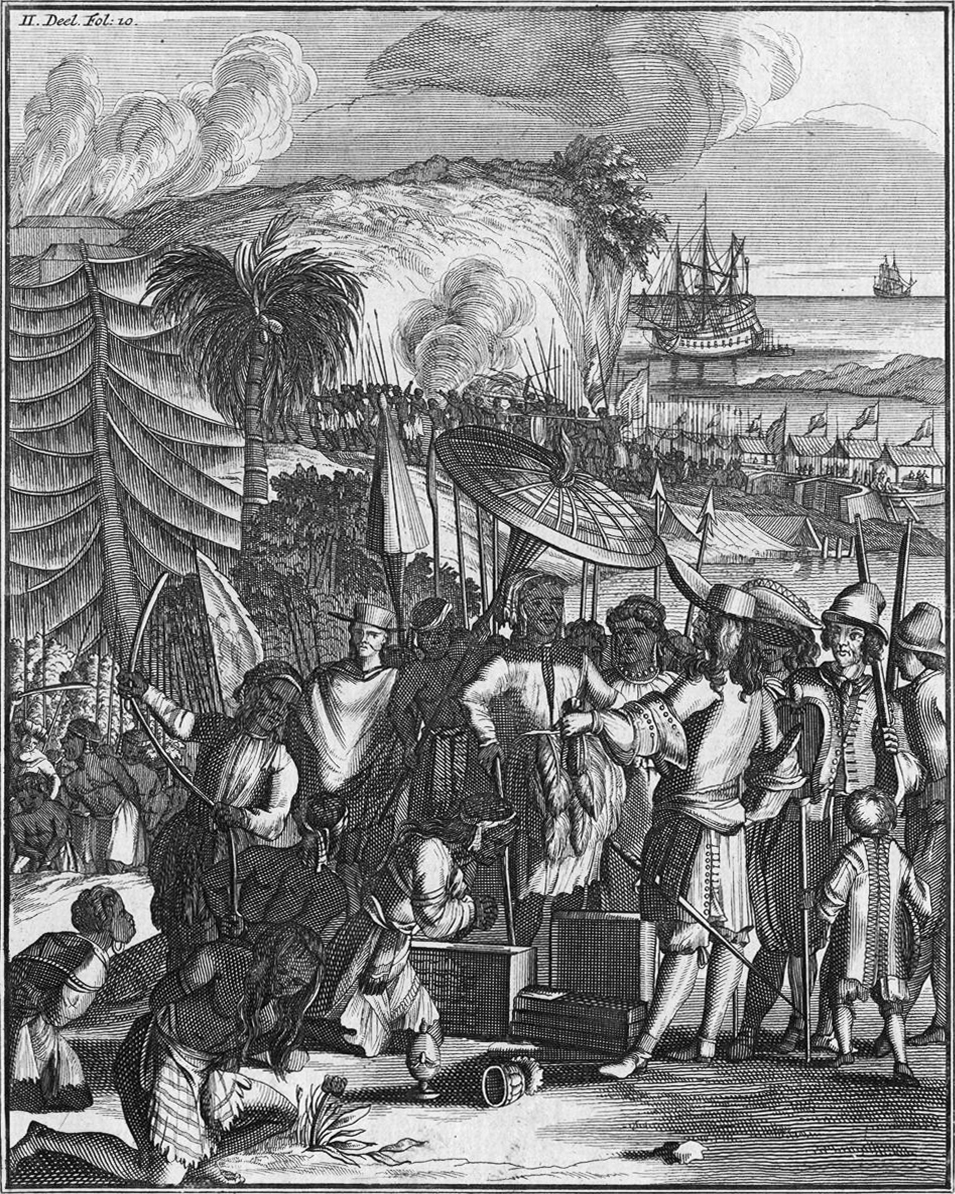
Natives of Arakan sell slaves to the Dutch East India Company, c. 1663 CE

The company has been criticised for the results of its quasi-absolute commercial monopoly, colonialism, exploitation (including use of slave labour), slave trade, use of violence, environmental destruction (including deforestation), and for its overly bureaucratic organisational structure.

Batavia, corresponding to present day Jakarta, was the headquarters of the Dutch East India Company, and had a strict social hierarchy in the colony. According to Marsely L. Kahoe in The Journal of Historians of Netherlandish Art, "it is misleading to understand Batavia, as some scholars have, as representing a pragmatic and egalitarian order that was later corrupted by the colonial situation. In fact, the social stratification and segregation of Batavia derived in certain ways directly from its Dutch plan."

There was an extraordinarily high mortality rate among employees of the VOC due to shipwrecks, illnesses such as scurvy and dysentery, and clashes with rival trading companies and pirates. Between 1602 and 1795, about one million seamen and craftsmen departed from Holland, but only 340,000 returned. J.L. van Zanden writes that "the VOC 'consumed' approximately 4,000 people per year."

=== Colonialism, monopoly and violence ===
Your Honours know by experience that trade in Asia must be driven and maintained under the protection and favour of Your Honours' own weapons, and that the weapons must be paid for by the profits from the trade; so that we cannot carry on trade without war nor war without trade.

— Jan Pieterszoon Coen, the VOC's de facto chief executive [in the East Indies], to the Heeren XVII, the VOC's board of directors [in the Dutch Republic], in 1614

The VOC charter allowed it to act as a quasi-sovereign state and engage in brutal conquests. One example is the Dutch conquest of the Banda Islands, between 1609 and 1621, after the islands resisted the nutmeg monopoly. The Dutch launched punitive expeditions that resulted in the near-destruction of Bandanese society. They invaded the main Bandanese island of Lontor in 1621. 2,800 Bandanese were killed, mostly from famine, and 1,700 were enslaved during the attack.

The total population of the islands was estimated at 15,000 people before the conquest. Although the exact number remains uncertain, it is estimated that around 14,000 people were killed, enslaved or fled elsewhere, with only 1,000 Bandanese surviving in the islands, and were spread throughout the nutmeg groves as forced labourers. The treatment of slaves was harsh and the native Bandanese population dropped to 1,000 by 1681. 200 slaves were imported annually to sustain the slave population at a total of 4,000.

In 1623 on Ambon (Amboina), VOC officials arrested, tortured, and executed ten English East India Company employees along with Japanese and Portuguese auxiliaries for an alleged conspiracy, an episode known as the Amboyna massacre that ended Anglo-Dutch cooperation in the Moluccas and showcased the Company's reliance on judicial coercion to police its monopolies.

In 1740, amid a severe downturn in Batavia's sugar economy, VOC troops and allied militias killed thousands of ethnic Chinese residents; scholarly estimates range from about 5,000 to over 10,000 deaths in what became known as the Batavia massacre.

Earlier, in 1636, VOC forces mounted a punitive expedition on Lamey (Lamay) Island off Taiwan after shipwreck incidents; most inhabitants were killed or deported and the island was effectively depopulated.

=== Dutch slave trade and slavery under the VOC colonial rule ===
By the time the settlement was established at the Cape in 1652, the VOC already had a long experience of practicing slavery in the East Indies. Jan van Riebeeck concluded within two months of the establishment of the Cape settlement that slave labour would be needed for the hardest and dirtiest work. Initially, the VOC considered enslaving men from the indigenous Khoikhoi population, but the idea was rejected on the grounds that such a policy would be both costly and dangerous. Most Khoikhoi had chosen not to labour for the Dutch because of low wages and harsh conditions. In the beginning, the settlers traded with the Khoikhoi, but the harsh working conditions and low wages imposed by the Dutch led to a series of wars. The European population remained under 200 during the settlement's first five years, and war against neighbours numbering more than 20,000 would have been foolhardy. Moreover, the Dutch feared that Khoikhoi people, if enslaved, could always escape into the local community, whereas foreigners would find it much more difficult to escape and survive or avoid recapture.

Between 1652 and 1657, a number of unsuccessful attempts were made to obtain men from the Dutch East Indies and from Mauritius. In 1658, however, the VOC landed two shiploads of slaves at the Cape, one containing more than 200 people brought from Dahomey (later Benin), the second with almost 200 people, most of them children, captured from a Portuguese slaver off the coast of Angola. Except for a few individuals, these were to be the only slaves ever brought to the Cape from West Africa. From 1658 to the end of the company's rule, many more slaves were brought regularly to the Cape in various ways, chiefly by Company-sponsored slaving voyages and slaves brought to the Cape by its return fleets. From these sources and by natural growth, the slave population increased from zero in 1652 to about 1,000 by 1700. During the 18th century, the slave population increased dramatically to 16,839 by 1795. After the slave trade was initiated, all of the slaves imported into the Cape until Britain passed the Slave Trade Act 1807 were from East Africa, Mozambique, Madagascar, and South and Southeast Asia. Large numbers were brought from Ceylon and the Indonesian archipelago. Prisoners from other countries in the VOC's empire were also enslaved. The slave population, which exceeded that of the European settlers until the first quarter of the nineteenth century, was overwhelmingly male and was thus dependent on constant imports of new slaves to maintain and to augment its size.

By the 1660s the Cape settlement was importing slaves from Ceylon, Malaya (Malaysia), and Madagascar to work on the farms. Conflict between Dutch farmers and Khoikhoi broke out once it became clear to the latter that the Dutch were there to stay and that they intended to encroach on the lands of the pastoralists. In 1659 Doman, a Khoikhoi who had worked as a translator for the Dutch and had even travelled to Java, led an armed attempt to expel the Dutch from the Cape peninsula. The attempt was a failure, although warfare dragged on until an inconclusive peace was established a year later. During the following decade, pressure on the Khoikhoi grew as more of the Dutch became free burghers, expanded their landholdings, and sought pastureland for their growing herds. War broke out again in 1673 and continued until 1677, when Khoikhoi resistance was destroyed by a combination of superior European weapons and Dutch manipulation of divisions among the local people. Thereafter, Khoikhoi society in the western Cape disintegrated. Some people found jobs as shepherds on European farms; others rejected foreign rule and moved away from the Cape. The final blow for most came in 1713 when a Dutch ship brought smallpox to the Cape. Hitherto unknown locally, the disease ravaged the remaining Khoikhoi, killing 90% of the population. Throughout the eighteenth century, the settlement continued to expand through internal growth of the European population and the continued importation of slaves. The approximately 3,000 Europeans and slaves at the Cape in 1700 had increased by the end of the century to nearly 20,000 Europeans, and approximately 25,000 slaves.

== Archives and records ==
The VOC's operations (trading posts and colonies) produced not only warehouses packed with spices, coffee, tea, textiles, porcelain and silk, but also shiploads of documents. Data on political, economic, cultural, religious, and social conditions spread over an enormous area circulated between the VOC establishments, the administrative centre of the trade in Batavia (modern-day Jakarta), and the board of directors (the Heeren XVII/Lords Seventeen) in the Dutch Republic. Twenty-five million pages of VOC records survive, held in Jakarta; Colombo, Sri Lanka; Chennai, India; Cape Town, South Africa; and The Hague, the Netherlands. In 2003, UNESCO added this collection of records to its Memory of the World international register.

== See also ==
- East India Company (disambiguation)
- Muscovy Company
- Levant Company
- British East India Company
- Danish East India Company
- Dutch West India Company
- Portuguese East India Company
- Compagnie des Indes
- Danish West India Company
- Hudson's Bay Company
- Mississippi Company
- South Sea Company
- Ostend Company
- Swedish East India Company
- Emden Company
- Austrian East India Company
- Swedish West India Company
- Russian-American Company
- 10649 VOC, a minor planet, the asteroid VOC (Dutch: Vereeniging van de Oostindische Compagnie, lit. 'East India Company'), the 10649th asteroid registered, a main-belt asteroid

== Bibliography ==
- De Vries, Jan; Van der Woude, Ad (1997). The First Modern Economy: Success, Failure, and Perseverance of the Dutch Economy, 1500–1815. Cambridge University Press. ISBN 0-521-57061-1.
- Fusaro, Maria; Allaire, Bernard; Blakemore, Richard J.; Vanneste, Tijl, eds. (2015). Law, Labour and Empire: Comparative Perspectives on Seafarers, c. 1500–1800. Palgrave Macmillan. ISBN 978-1-137-44746-3.
- Ricklefs, M. C. (1993). A History of Modern Indonesia Since c. 1300. London: MacMillan. ISBN 0-333-57689-6.
- Chaudhuri, K. N.; Israel, J. I. (1991). Israel, J. I. (ed.). The Anglo-Dutch Moment: Essays on the Glorious Revolution and Its World Impact. Cambridge University Press. ISBN 0-521-39075-3.
