= Brabantsche Compagnie =

Dutch trading company

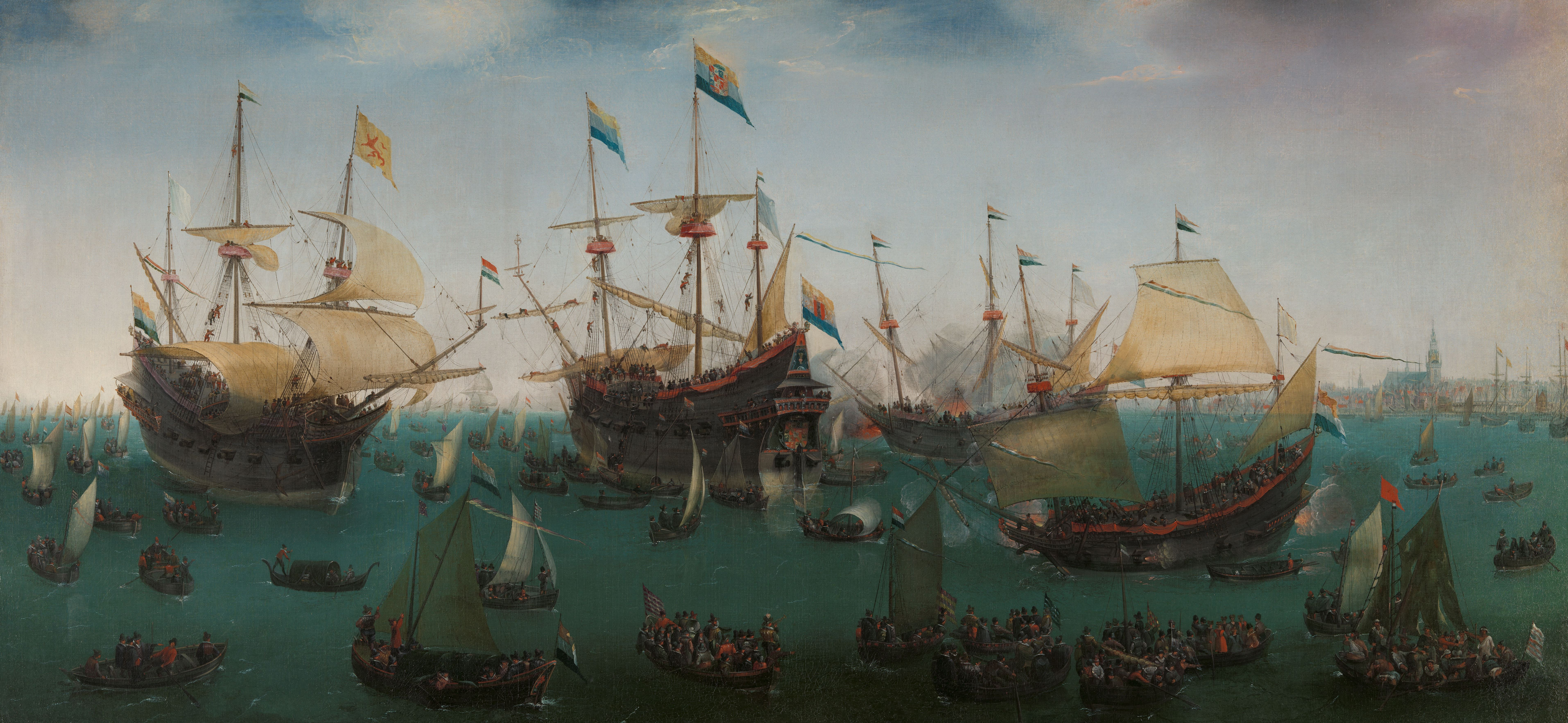
The return to Amsterdam of the second expedition to the East Indies, Hendrik Cornelisz Vroom, 1599

The Brabant Company (Dutch - Brabantsche Compagnie), also known as the New Company (Nieuwe Compagnie), was a precursor of the Dutch East India Company (VOC).

The Brabantsche Company was set up in 1599, by Jacques de Velaer, Isaac le Maire, Hans Hunger, Marcus de Vogelaer and Gerard Reynst. In 1600, the Brabantsche Company merged with the Compagnie van Verre to form the Vereenigde Compagnie van Amsterdam. Finally this company and other companies in Rotterdam, West Friesland and Zeeland merged into the VOC in 1602.

== See also ==
- European chartered companies founded around the 17th century (in French)
