= Veerse Compagnie =

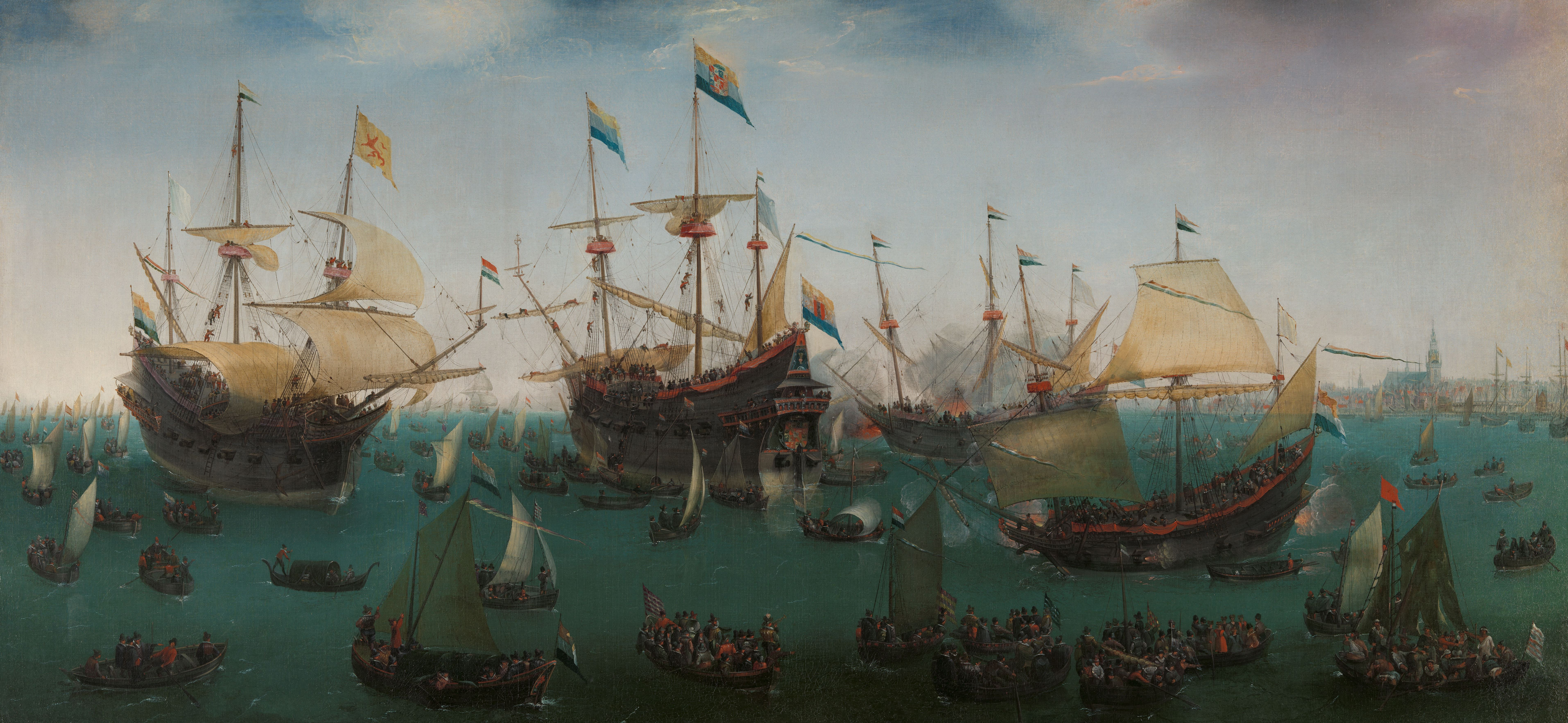
Return of the second Asia expedition of Jacob van Neck in 1599 by Cornelis Vroom (ca. 1591-1661)

The Veerse Compagnie (Company of Veere) was a pre-company from the Republic of the Seven United Netherlands that was founded by Balthazar de Moucheron, a ship owner from Antwerp in the Southern Netherlands. After the fall of Antwerp in 1585, he moved his business to Zeeland. The fleet of the Veerse Compagnie was made up of two ships; 'Leeuw' (Lion) and 'Leeuwin' (Lioness) and was headed by Cornelis Houtman. Its fleet left from Veere on 28 March 1598 and returned to the Republic of the Seven United Netherlands in 1600.

== History ==
A voorcompagnie (pre-company) is the naming given to the trading companies from the Republic of the Seven United Netherlands that traded on Asia between 1594 and 1602, before they all merged to form the Dutch East India Company (VOC). The pre-companies were financed by merchants from the Northern Netherlands and rich immigrants from the Southern Netherlands. Because of the deadly competition, the government forced the smaller trading companies to unite and form the (United) East India Company, that on its turn received exclusive rights for the trade with Asia for the following 21 years.

== Veerse Compagnie ==
In 1597 Cornelis de Houtman succeeded in the so-called Eerste Schipvaart (first expedition) to sail to Indonesia via Cape of Good Hope. From this moment on, Moucheron focussed on that trade route. Moucheron founded the Veerse Compagnie and became a main shareholder. In 1598 the Veerse Compagnie sent two ships, De Leeuw (the lion) and the Leeuwin (the lioness), under the supervision of Cornelis and Frederik de Houtman to East-India. The fleet returned in 1600 without the two brothers. Cornelis was killed and Frederik was captured on Atjeh. Initially the expedition was not a financial success.

== Citations ==
=== References ===
Sources:

- Unger, W.S. (1948) De oudste reizen van de Zeeuwen naar Oost-Indië. De Linschoten-Vereeniging LI. Den Haag: Martinus Nijhoff.
- Jonge, Jhr. Mr. J.K.J. de (1862) De opkomst van het Nederlandsch gezag in Oost-Indië, (1595-1610) Eerste deel Den Haag: Martinus Nijhoff
- ’’De familie de Moucheron’’. Rijksmuseum. URL bezocht op 12 April 2008.
- Wijnroks, E.H. (2003) Handel tussen Rusland en de Nederlanden, 1560-1640 Hilversum
- Gaastra, F. (2009) Geschiedenis van de VOC, p. 17-22.
- Witteveen, M. (2002) Een onderneming van landsbelang. De oprichting van de Verenigde Oostindische Compagnie in 1602
