= Cornelis Vroom =

Dutch Golden Age landscape painter (1591–1661)

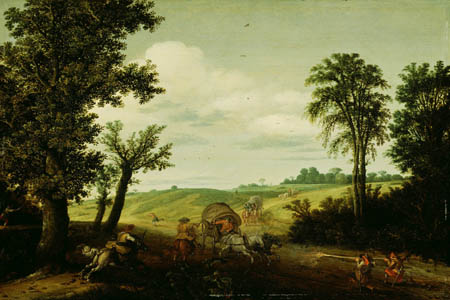
Cornelis Vroom, The Highway Robbery (1625), Detroit Institute of Arts, United States

Cornelis Hendriksz Vroom (1591, Haarlem - buried 16 September 1661, Haarlem) was a landscape painter during the Dutch Golden Age.

== Biography ==
According to the Netherlands Institute for Art History, Vroom was the son of painter Hendrick Cornelisz Vroom and his wife. He learned painting and followed his father into that profession. Vroom had two younger brothers, Frederick and Jacob.

He married and he and his wife had children, including son Jacob Cornelisz Vroom, who followed his father and also became a painter. In 1634 Vroom became a member of the Haarlem Guild of St. Luke.

According to Arnold Houbraken in 1718, who repeated a list of names from Theodorus Schrevelius's 1648 book on Haarlem called Harlemias, Vroom was the "son of Hendrick Cornelisz Vroom" and a good landscape painter of Haarlem, along with "Joh. Jakobsz.", "who was in Italy for many years", "Nicol. Zuyker", Gerrit Claesz Bleker, Salomon van Ruysdael, and Reyer van Blommendael.

Like his father, Vroom is best known for his landscapes and seascapes. He was a strong influence on fellow local Haarlem landscapist Jacob van Ruisdael.
