= Macau incident (1601) =

Execution of Dutch sailors by Portuguese

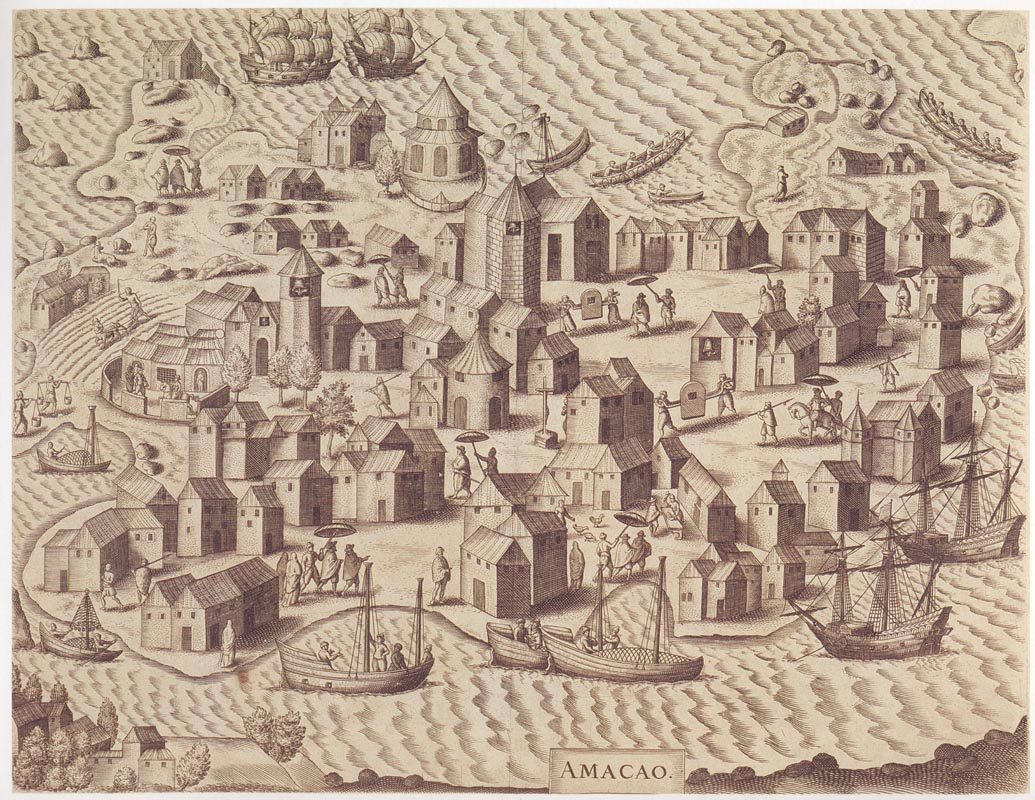
Depiction of Macau by Theodor de Bry, 1598

The Macau incident of 1601 occurred when the first Dutch ships reached the Chinese coast during the Age of Discovery. The Dutch squadron, led by Jacob Corneliszoon van Neck, approached the waters of Portuguese Macau on 27 September 1601, but were met with hostility by its residents, who captured the Dutch reconnaissance parties and summarily executed 17 of the crew. The news of this injustice incensed Dutch captains operating in Asian waters, leading to the capture of the Santa Catarina carrack in the Singapore Strait in 1603.

== Background ==
The Portuguese had established the prosperous entrepôt of Macau on the coast of China with the connivance of Ming Chinese officials in Guangdong after the Luso-Chinese agreement of 1554. Since its establishment, the city relied on its near-exclusive access to Chinese markets, and its residents zealously guarded their monopoly against other European attempts to replicate Portuguese successes on the Chinese coast. Shortly before the incident in Macau, Paulo de Portugal, the captain-major representing Macau, had fought off the Spanish presence in nearby El Piñal in 1600, even though the crowns of Portugal and Spain were in a dynastic union under Philip II of Spain. The El Piñal episode left the Macanese restless and exasperated, such that they were especially on alert when Dutch ships entered their waters for the first time.

The Dutch had been trying to sail to China since the 1590s since reports of Portuguese riches had reached the Netherlands. Dirck Gerritsz Pomp had been the first Dutchman to go to China in the early 1580s, albeit on a Portuguese ship. The stories he brought back to the Netherlands aided Dutch attempts to reach China themselves, which resulted in the first Dutch Expedition to the East Indies that, while not reaching China, managed to meet Chinese people in Bantam on Java in 1596. Jacob Corneliszoon van Neck led a second Dutch Expedition to the East Indies from 1598 to 1600 that was hugely profitable, and Van Neck was tasked by the Oude Compagnie to repeat his success again by leading another expedition to the East Indies, with a view to establish trade relations with China. Van Neck set sail from Amsterdam on 28 June 1600.

== Incident ==
=== Dutch landfall ===
Despite the Dutch Revolt against Spain at the time, the Dutch initially had cordial relations with the Portuguese, as evidenced by the fact that Dutchmen like Pomp and Jan Huyghen van Linschoten had sailed to Asia under the employ of the Portuguese. While the Iberian Union naturally turned Portugal against the enemies of Spain, Dutch navigators between 1595 and 1601 assumed they could continue friendly contact in outlying places. Thus when Van Neck reached Ternate in the Maluku Islands, he was incensed to hear that the Portuguese garrison of Tidore had massacred the crew of the Dutch ship Trouw. He took two ships to attack Tidore, but he was bested by the 5 Portuguese ships at its harbour. Losing three fingers in the battle, Van Neck retreated back to Ternate and decided to leave for Patani on the Malay peninsula on 31 July 1601. Contrary seasonal winds and typhoons, however, forced Van Neck to change course for the Chinese coast, which they sighted on 20 September 1601. This was the first time Dutch ships reached China.

Seeking the island of Saint John (Shangchuan), Van Neck followed the directions given by a Tanka boatman and sailed east with the ships Amsterdam and Gouda until, on 27 September, he made out the silhouette of "a great town [...] all built in the Spanish style, on the hill a Portuguese church and on top of it a large blue cross," which he knew to be Macau from Jan Huyghen's writings. Upon setting anchor in a bay near Macau, Van Neck sent the factor Martinus Apius to lead a party of 11 men ashore to seek trade under terms of friendship. Apius's men, assured by white flags of truce from the residents of the city, had hardly disembarked in Macau before they were all captured by the Portuguese. Not knowing what happened to Apius, Van Neck dispatched a second party of nine on a pinnace to sound the waters around Taipa island, but they, too, were caught by the Portuguese after the latter attacked the Dutch boat with 5 junk boats. With no way to establish contact with the authorities on shore let alone the means to negotiate for the release of his men, Van Neck left the coast of China on 3 October with the mistaken impression that the Chinese, with their "barbaric customs", had committed "an inhumane deed" by detaining twenty of his men for no reason without any warning.

=== Chinese deliberations ===
Unbeknownst to Van Neck, his fleet was closely watched by Chinese authorities at the time. The mandarin Wang Linheng (王臨亨) wrote in his Yue Jian Bian (粤劍編) that the supreme commander of Guangdong and Guangxi, Dai Yao (戴燿), was planning to have the Ming navy either intercept the Dutch or swoop in after letting the Dutch and the Portuguese fight each other. Over dinner and some wine, Wang Linheng persuaded Dai Yao that the Dutch came to China to trade, and it would reflect badly on the Chinese to respond with force of arms. Instead, Wang suggested that interpreters should be sent to direct the Dutch to settle and trade a fair distance away from the Portuguese, and the Portuguese should be warned to not resort to violence. This way, Wang argued, there would be a new source of profit to line the Emperor's coffers and there would be peace in Cantonese waters. Dai agreed, and the eunuch tax commissioner Li Feng (李鳳) led a party to Macau to investigate the matter.

=== Portuguese executions ===
Martinus Apius and the other Dutch captives were brought to a church in Macau by captain-major Paulo de Portugal soon after their capture. Macau's Chinese authorities brought a Portuguese-speaking interpreter to question the Dutch in the presence of their Portuguese captors. There, Apius explained that the Dutch came to China to seek trade and they had with them a patent from the Prince of Orange to the Emperor of China for that purpose. No sooner had Apius finished speaking than the Portuguese crowd erupted in commotion so great that the interpreter was not given a chance to translate Apius's words for the Chinese mandarins. Paulo de Portugal took the mandarins by the hand and ushered them into another room amidst the hubbub, promising to relay Apius's words to them. Evidently, this was not done. That night, Apius and his men were led to a dungeon where they would be interrogated. Apius had told his party not to tell their Portuguese captors about their attack on Tidore, but he was not able to warn the second reconnaissance party likewise. Under torture, a crew member from the latter party confessed that Van Neck had lost three fingers in a battle against the Portuguese in Tidore. The Portuguese auditor Joao Rodrigues de Souto accused Apius of lying by omission and subjected him to more torture, but de Souto was not able to extract more information from Apius.

When the eunuch tax commissioner Li Feng arrived in Macau, he demanded that the Dutch captives be handed over to the Chinese. As their access to the profitable Chinese trade was on the line, the Portuguese dared not defy this demand. However, they selected six Dutchmen who did not speak Portuguese, falsely claiming that the rest of the prisoners died of dysentery. Try as they might, Li Feng and his interpreters could not communicate with the six Dutchmen, just as the Portuguese had planned, and he was forced to return empty-handed.

Dissatisfied by Li Feng's incomplete report, his superiors in Guangzhou made it known that they wanted all the Dutch prisoners to be extradited to Guangzhou. As the Portuguese merchants in Guangzhou relayed this wish back to Macau, the Portuguese in Macau resolved to execute the Dutch prisoners before the extradition could be carried out. The reason, according to both Apius and de Souto, was that Portuguese trade would be severely affected if the Dutch were able to establish contact with the Chinese. From how the provincial authorities reacted to the El Piñal episode with the Spanish, de Souto had reason to believe the Chinese would also be willing to grant the Dutch trade privileges to the detriment of the Portuguese. The record of Wang Linheng's discussion with Dai Yao shows that this was indeed the case.

Having decided on a course of action, de Souto led a mob to urge Paulo de Portugal to sign the deaths of the Dutch prisoners. De Portugal initially demurred, since the authority to sentence men to death laid with his superior, the Viceroy of Goa, but he eventually relented. In November, the six Dutchmen who appeared before Li Feng were hanged, and 11 others were put into the sea with stones strapped around their necks. Of the 20 prisoners, only Martinus Apius and two 17-year-old boys were spared. The three were transported to Portuguese Malacca.

== Aftermath ==
In Malacca, Martinus Apius was brought before the captain-major of that city, Fernão de Albuquerque. After confirming that Van Neck's fleet had no intention to attack Portuguese ships around Macau, Albuquerque confided to Apius that he felt Paulo de Portugal had acted inappropriately due to his lack of experience, and that the massacre in Macau would lead to trouble. In his later correspondence, Albuquerque considered himself a "good friend" to the three survivors when they were in Malacca, and unequivocally condemned the judicial murders committed by Joao Rodrigues de Souto and Paulo de Portugal in Macau. De Souto was incarcerated and eventually put to death; de Portugal, however, died of dysentery in Malacca before he could answer for the Macau incident. Apius eventually made his way back to Holland where he narrated his experiences before a notary in 1604.

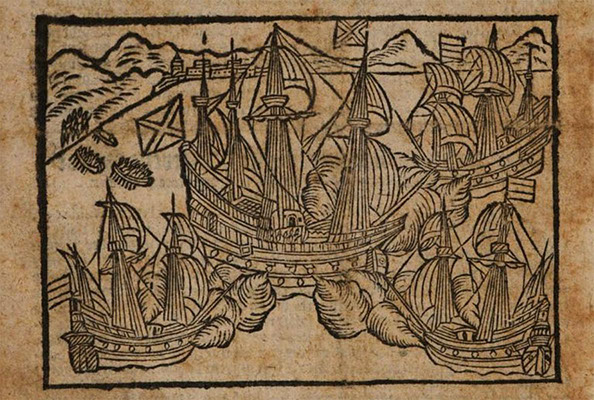
The capture of Santa Catarina, 1604 woodcut

In the summer of 1602, a Dutch fleet under the command of Jacob van Heemskerck captured a Portuguese supply ship off Grissee. Aboard the ship were letters detailing the Macau massacre, which set Van Heemskerck in a mood for revenge. He met up with Van Neck in Patani, who had already been informed of what actually transpired in Macau from Chinese merchants. Van Heemskerck was in a mind to kill the Portuguese prisoners of the captured ship, but Van Neck interceded, having been persuaded by a Flemish merchant that the Portuguese prisoners were not personally responsible for the Macau incident. Van Neck left Patani a few weeks later, leaving behind Van Heemskerck who was determined to seek revenge for the deaths of his compatriots. This he got on 25 February 1603 where he captured the richly-laden carrack Santa Catarina after months of waiting in the Singapore Strait. The spoils from the carrack was worth so much—around 2.2 million guilders, or more than 50% of the Dutch East India Company—that the Dutch Republic shifted its maritime policy against the Portuguese from one of defence and accommodation to one of privateering and disruption. To legitimise this new policy and the capture of the Santa Catarina, the Company called upon the services of the jurist Hugo Grotius to provide legal justification for their privateering. Grotius made full use of Martinus Apius's testimony in his defence of Van Heemskerck's actions, and although the resulting manuscript was not used, one chapter of it was published as a pamphlet under the name Mare Liberum that became an important work establishing the principle of the freedom of the seas in international law.

The next time a Dutch fleet reached China was in 1604 when Wybrand van Warwijck brought his fleet to the Penghu islands intending to establish trade. By this time the Dutch–Portuguese War was in full swing and the Chinese, having gotten an earful of Dutch piracy in Southeast Asia, were less inclined to trade with the Dutch. Van Warwijck was chased away by the Ming navy, and the Dutch would not be able to establish trade with China until they settled on the island of Taiwan in 1624.
