= Jacob Corneliszoon van Neck =

Dutch naval officer and explorer

Jacob Cornelisz. van Neck
- Jacob Corneliszoon van Neck
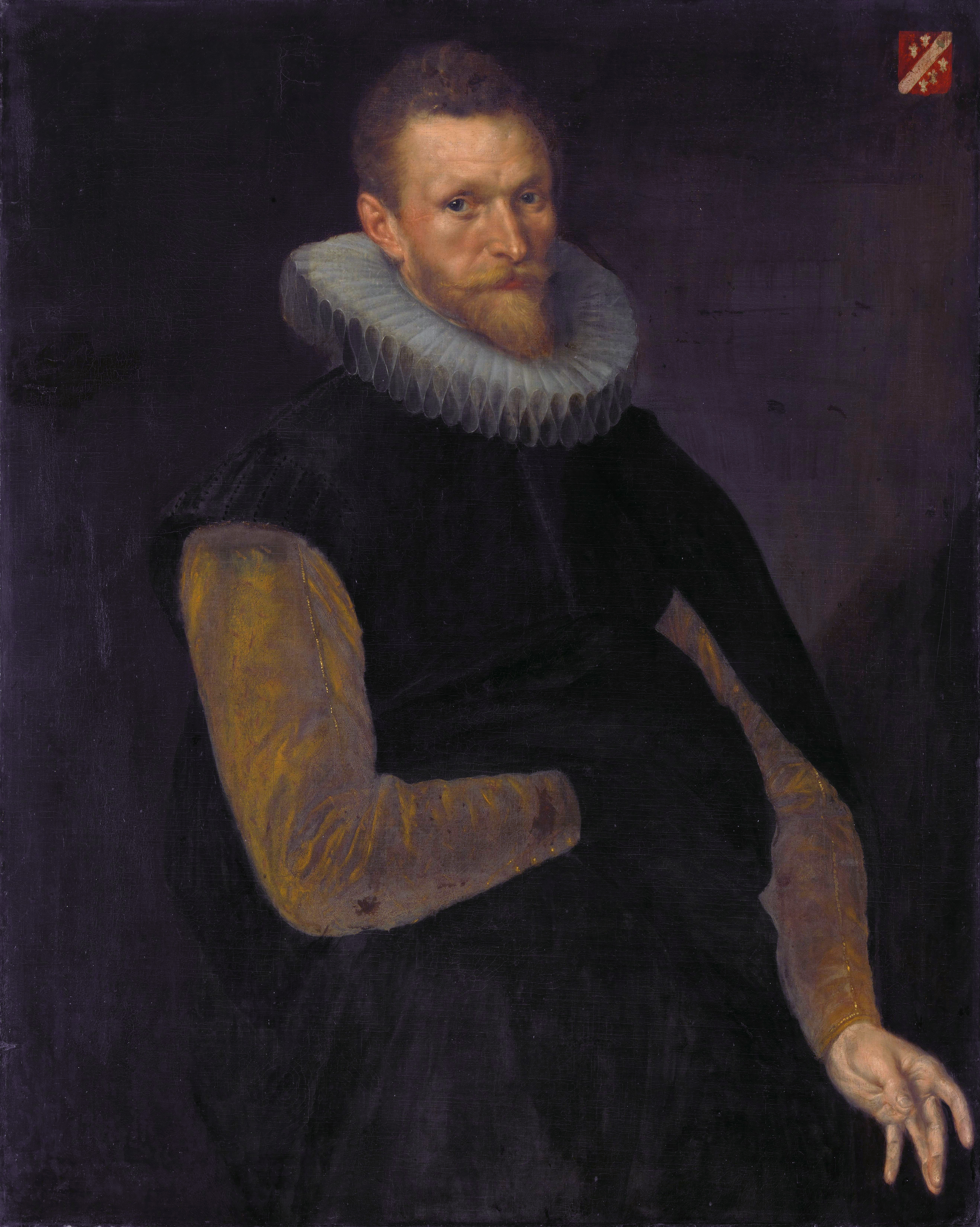
- Portrait by Cornelis Ketel, 1605
- Born: 1564
- Died: 8 March 1638 (aged 73–74)
- Other name: Jacob Cornelius van Neck (anglicised version)
- Occupations: Naval officer; explorer
- Employer: Dutch East India Company

Jacob Corneliszoon van Neck (often anglicized to Jacob Cornelius van Neck) (1564 – 8 March 1638) was a Dutch naval officer and explorer who led the second Dutch expedition of the Dutch East India Company to the East Indies (now Indonesia) from 1598 to 1599.

== Early life ==
Van Neck was from an Amsterdam family in good standing, and received a thorough education. Since he came from a commercial background and was not experienced in sailing, he took extra classes in navigation.

== Second Dutch Expedition ==
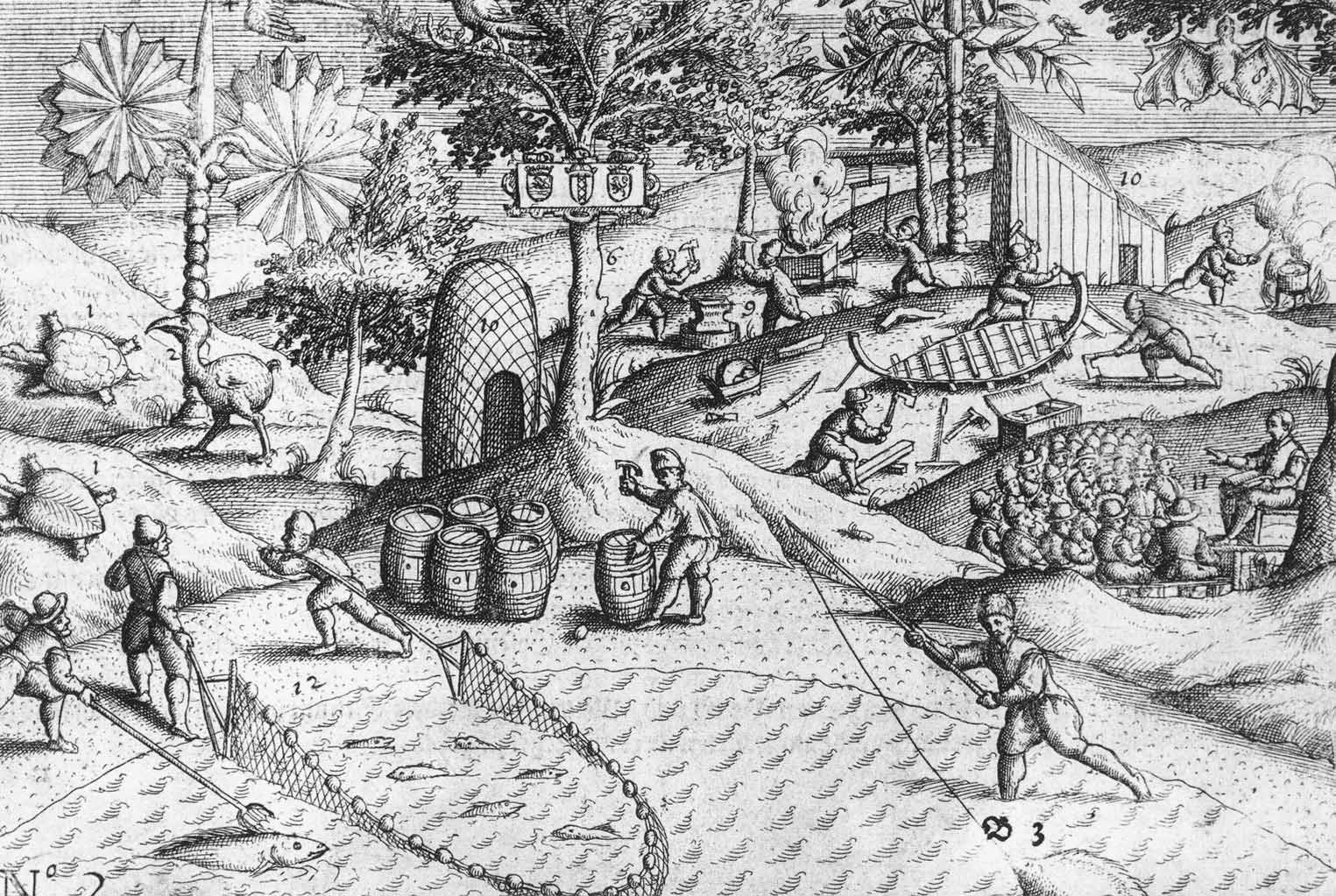
Illustration from van Neck's Het Tweede Boeck showing Dutch activities on the shore of Mauritius, as well as the first published depiction of a dodo bird, above left

Following the success of the first Dutch expedition to the East Indies in 1597, Van Neck was chosen to lead a second expedition in 1598, with the purpose of bringing back various spices. In May 1598, he left the port of Texel with eight vessels under his command. He was accompanied by Vice-Admiral Wybrand van Warwyck and noted polar explorer Jacob van Heemskerk. Following sailing directions written by Petrus Plancius, they made excellent progress, reaching the Cape of Good Hope in only three months.

Soon after this, heavy storms separated Van Neck, with three ships, from the rest of the fleet under Warwyck. Van Neck landed on the east coast of Madagascar and replenished his supplies, then continued on towards the Indonesian city of Bantam. He reached it on 25 November 1598, after less than seven months of sailing. Within one month, all three of his ships had been filled with spice, and on 31 December the other half of the fleet sailed into port at Bantam, prompting a huge New Year's celebration. Van Neck filled one more ship full of spices, making four ready to be sailed back to Amsterdam, then sent Warwyck and Heemskerck with the other four ships to the east in order to procure more spices. Van Neck then took the four ships that had been loaded with spices back to Amsterdam, where he arrived July, 1599.

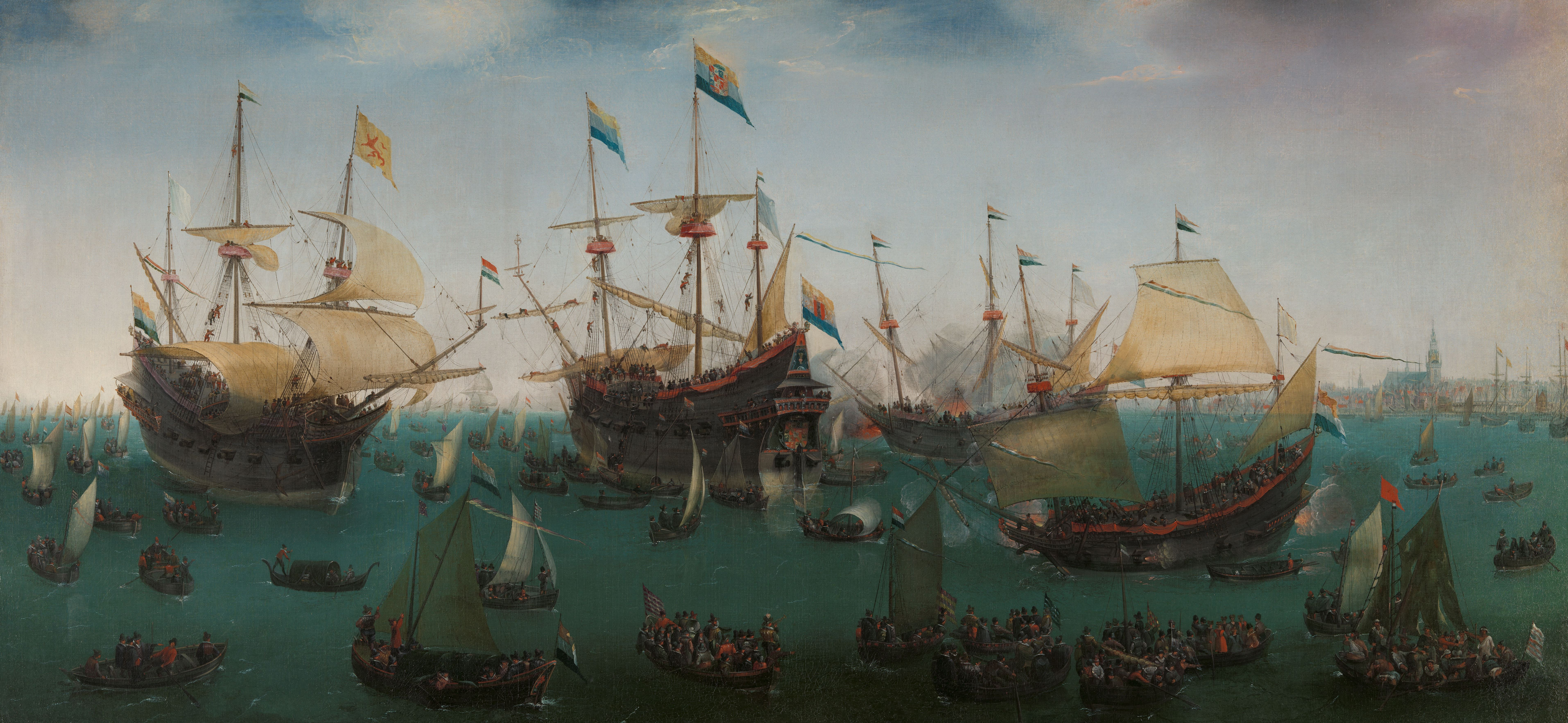
The voyage's return in 1599, by Hendrik Cornelisz Vroom

He brought back with him nearly 450,000 kg (1,000,000 lb) in weight of pepper and cloves, in addition to half a ship full of nutmeg, mace, and cinnamon. The explorers were greeted by an ecstatic Amsterdam and paraded through the city behind a band of trumpeters, with every church bell tolling. The merchants who had backed the voyage rewarded Van Neck with a gold beaker (it later turned out to be only gold-plated) and the crew were given as much wine as they could drink.

The voyage was a tremendous success, earning the backers a 400 percent return on their investment.

== Later life ==
Van Neck made one more expedition to the East Indies after his voyage of 1598. During this expedition, he lost three fingers while doing battle with a Spanish-Portuguese fleet near Ternate, and brought Dutch ships to China for the first time in 1601. However, the Portuguese in Macau, adamant in preventing the Dutch from trading with China, waylaid Van Neck's reconnaissance parties and executed 17 of their members. Van Neck left the coast of China without establishing contact with the Chinese authorities or knowing what happened to his crew.

He retired from exploring after that, and later became a mayor of Amsterdam, and alderman, and a member of two admiralty colleges. He died on 8 March 1638.

== Sources ==
- Blussé, Leonard (1988). "Brief Encounter at Macao". Modern Asian Studies. 22 (3): 647–664. doi:10.1017/S0026749X00009732. ISSN 0026-749X.
- Masselman, George (1963). The Cradle of Colonialism. New Haven: Yale University Press. LCCN 63007939. OCLC 242863. OL 5877706M.
- Milton, Giles (1999). Nathaniel's Nutmeg or, The True and Incredible Adventures of the Spice Trader Who Changed the Course of History. New York: Penguin Books. ISBN 0-374-21936-2.
- Winchester, Simon (2003). Krakatoa: The Day the World Exploded, August 27, 1883. New York: HarperCollins. ISBN 0-06-621285-5.
