= Second Dutch Expedition to the East Indies =

Second voyage of Dutch ships to East Indies in 1598–1600

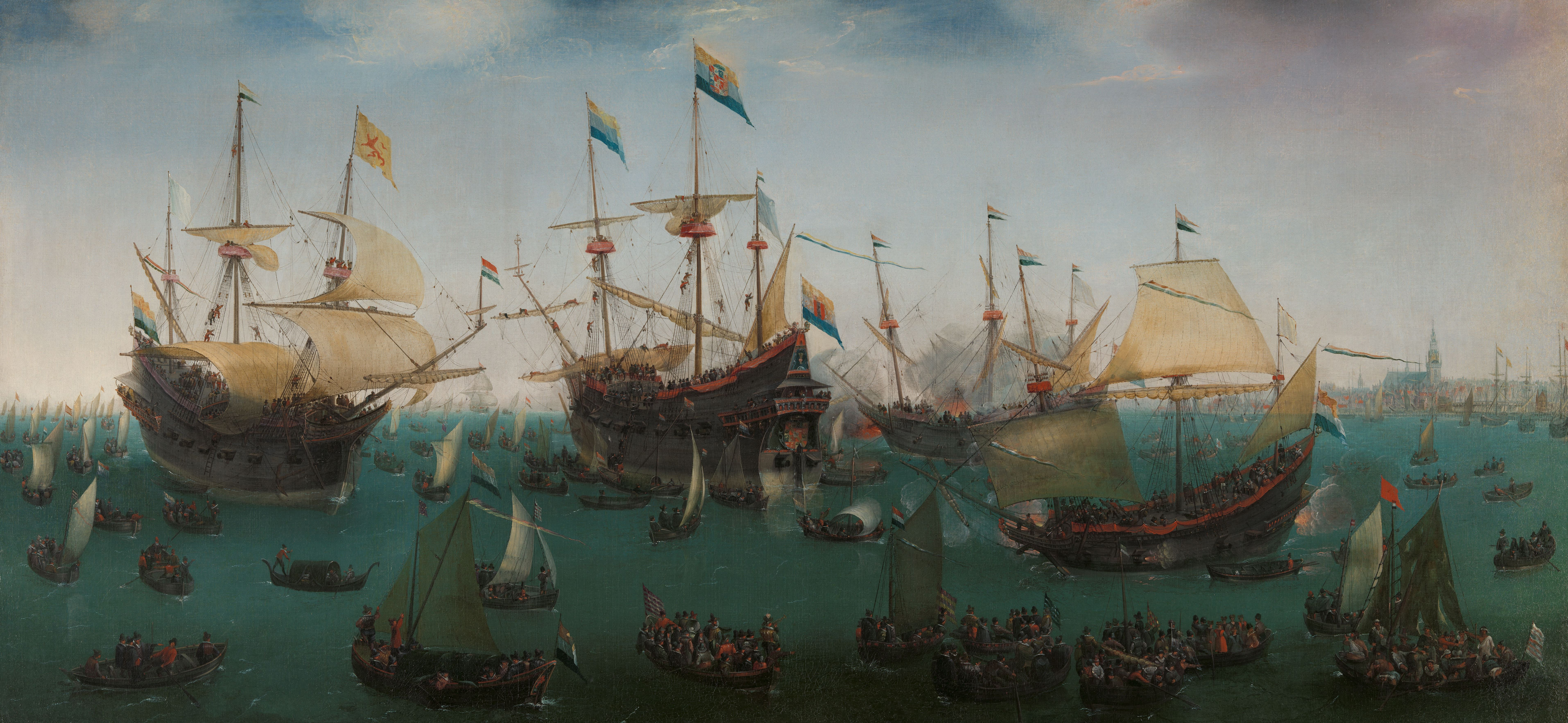
The voyage's return in 1599, by Cornelis Vroom

The Second Dutch Expedition to the East Indies was an expedition that took place from 1598 to 1600, one of the Dutch forays into the East Indies spice trade that led to the establishment of the Dutch East India Company (VOC). It was led by Jacob Cornelius van Neck.

== Background ==
During the 16th century, the Portuguese dominated the spice trade, but after the first Dutch expedition to Indonesia under Cornelis de Houtman, the backers of that expedition decided that the time was ripe for further forays into the Indonesian spice market. The company behind the first expedition, the Far-distance Company, and the recently established New Company for Voyages to East India joined forces and between them managed to raise nearly 800,000 guilders (equivalent to €33 million in 2024) the most money that had ever been raised in the Netherlands for a private venture.

In 1592 the cartographer Petrus Plancius published a series of charts showing, in exact detail, the route to the Indies, which was the spark that instigated the first Dutch expedition to Indonesia. Plancius was interested in the new venture, and pored over the accounts of the first expedition in order to write a set of sailing directions for the expedition.

=== Composition of the fleet ===
Admiral Jacob van Neck was chosen as the leader, with Vice-Admiral Wybrand van Warwyck and arctic explorer Jacob van Heemskerck as his lieutenants. Also aboard was Willem Janszoon and English explorer John Davis acting as pilot. On 1 May 1598, the fleet sailed from Texel.

The fleet was composed of eight vessels: Mauritius and Hollandia, which had sailed with the first fleet, as well as Amsterdam, Zeelandia, Geldria, Utrecht, Vriesland and a smaller ship, Overeyssel. These last five were all named after Dutch provinces.

The expedition was financed by the Old Company, whose principal investors included Isaac le Maire. The commercial success of the voyage yielded profits of around 400%, stimulated a wave of new investment in the East Indies trade.

== Voyage ==
The fleet made excellent time at first, rounding the Cape of Good Hope in only three months. However, soon after reaching the Cape the fleet was hit by heavy storms, and was split into two parts. Van Neck with three ships quickly recovered and landed on the East coast of Madagascar in order to replenish supplies, while the other ships under Warwyck could not land on Madagascar due to the storm.

=== To Bantam ===
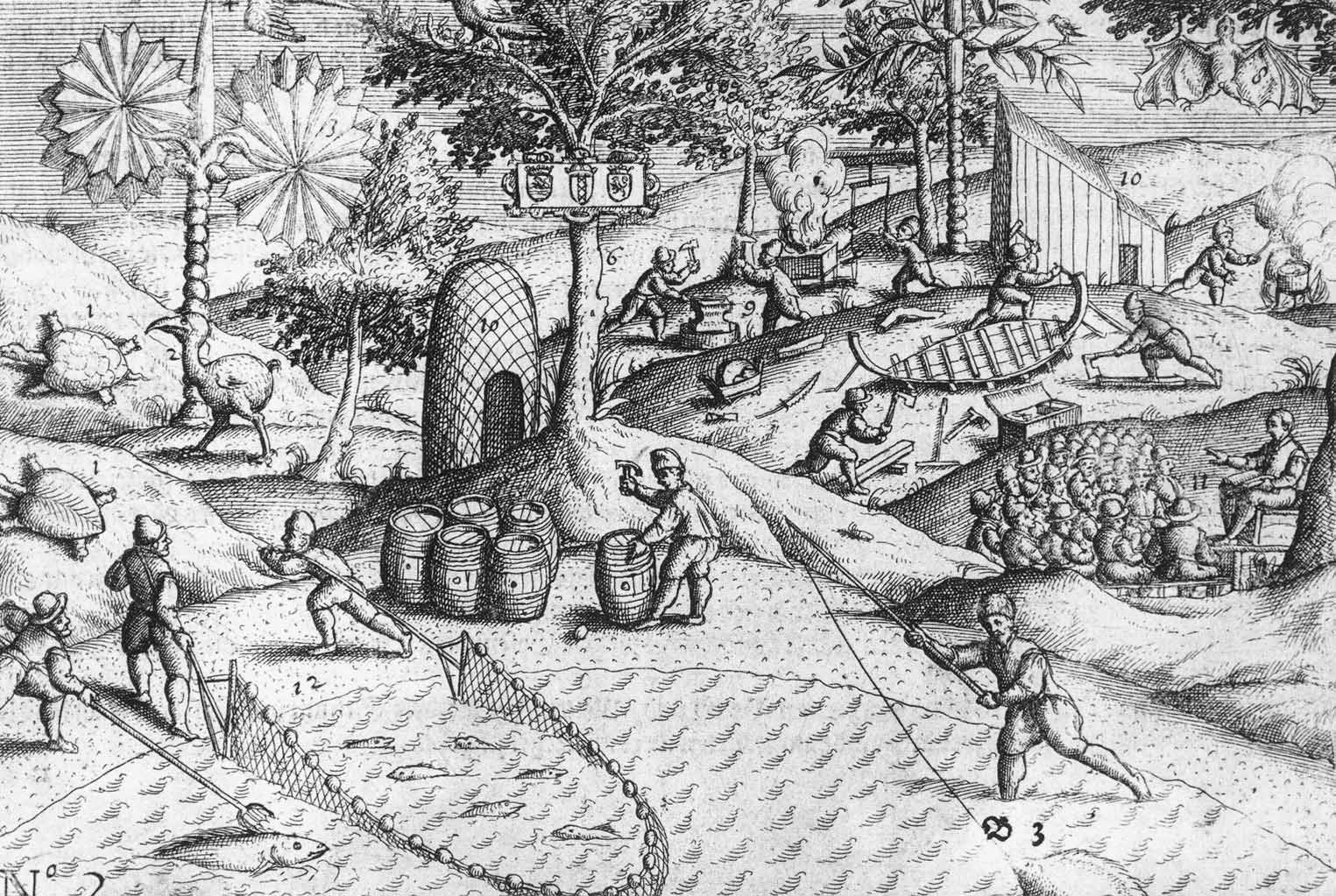
Illustration from van Neck's "Het Tweede Boeck" showing Dutch activities on the shore of Mauritius, as well as the first published depiction of a dodo bird, on the left

After seven months of sailing in all, Van Neck and his three ships reached the trading city of Bantam on 25 November. The Bantamese received the Dutch eagerly, because they had recently fought with the Portuguese and destroyed three of their ships, so they hoped to gain protection from any vengeful Portuguese fleets by forging an alliance with Van Neck. Within one month he had filled all three ships full of spices.

The other ships, meanwhile, landed on the island of Do Cerne, which they renamed Mauritius in honour of Maurice of Nassau. They left a rooster and seven hens on the island, and also planted many seeds, including some orange and lemon trees. They then sailed for Bantam, which they reached on 30 December, prompting a joyous New Year celebration on the part of Van Neck's men.

=== Van Neck's return ===
Van Neck quickly filled one of the four ships brought by Warwyck with spice and then sailed for home with it and the other three that he had already filled. He reached Amsterdam in July 1599, the journey having taken half as long as the de Houtman expedition. The crew were paraded through the streets behind a troupe of trumpeters as all the bells in the city tolled, then given as much wine as they could drink, while Van Neck was presented with a golden beaker. Van Neck brought back with him nearly 450 tonnes (1 million pounds) of pepper and cloves, as well as half a ship of nutmeg, mace, and cinnamon.

=== The rest of the fleet ===
Before he sailed for Amsterdam, Van Neck sent the remaining four ships east to the Spice Islands in order to obtain more spices. On their voyage they encountered no trouble except on the coast of Madura Island, where the king of Arissabaya, in revenge for an earlier Dutch attack, captured several sailors and extracted a ransom for them. They reached Ambon Island in March 1599, but there were not enough cloves available, so it was decided that Warwyck would sail north, to Ternate, while Heemskerck would head for the Banda Islands.

Warwyck reached Ternate without incident, and in celebration fired off so much ammunition that the very ground shook. They were received well, primarily because the king of Ternate was at war with neighbouring Tidore, and was happy to have military assistance. Warwyck filled his ships with spices and then headed home, picking up some more pepper at Bantam before reaching Amsterdam in September 1600.

Heemskerck, however, who reached Great Banda in mid-March, 1599, received a chilly welcome from the indigenous inhabitants, who were unhappy due to bad past experiences with the Portuguese, and because a nearby volcanoes had been active recently, foretelling evil. He eventually succeeded in winning the compliance of the natives, and left behind twenty-two men to stockpile nutmeg so that future Dutch fleets would be able to purchase it without trouble. He reached home in May 1600.

== Results ==
The expedition was considered a tremendous success, netting a 400% profit for its backers.

== See also ==
- First Dutch Expedition to Indonesia
- Dutch East India Company in Indonesia
- European exploration of Australia
- Janszoon voyage of 1605-6
- Voyage of the Pera and Arnhem to Australia in 1623
- New Holland (Australia)
- Australian places with Dutch names
- History of the Northern Territory
- History of Western Australia
- History of South Australia
- History of Tasmania

== Sources ==
- Huygens Institute (2025). "The Dutch East India Company's shipping between the Netherlands and Asia 1595-1795". Huygens Instituut. Huygens Institute for the History of the Netherlands.
- Masselman, George (1963). The Cradle of Colonialism. New Haven: Yale University Press. LCCN 63007939. OCLC 242863. OL 5877706M.
- Milton, Giles (1999). Nathaniel's Nutmeg or, The True and Incredible Adventures of the Spice Trader Who Changed the Course of History. New York: Penguin Books. ISBN 0-374-21936-2.
- Mutch, Thomas Davies (1942). The First Discovery of Australia; With an Account of the Voyage of the "Duyfken" and the Career of Captain Willem Jansz. Sydney: Thomas Davies Mutch. OCLC 1058014886. Archived from the original on 14 February 2020 – via Project Gutenberg Australia.
- Winchester, Simon (2003). Krakatoa: The Day the World Exploded, August 27, 1883. New York: HarperCollins. ISBN 0-06-621285-5.
