= Santa Catarina (ship) =

Carrack of the Portuguese Navy, seized 1603

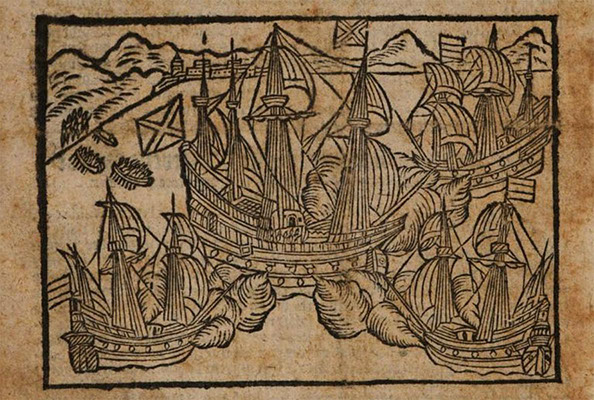
- Capture of Santa Catarina, 1604 woodcut print.

History
- Captured: February 1603

General characteristics
- Type: Carrack
- Tonnage: 1500 tons

Santa Catarina was a Portuguese merchant ship, a 1500-ton carrack, that was seized by the Dutch East India Company (also known as VOC) on 25 February 1603 off Singapore. She was such a rich prize that her sale proceeds increased the capital of the VOC by more than 50%. From the large amounts of Ming Chinese porcelain captured in this ship, Chinese pottery became known in Holland as Kraakporselein, or "carrack-porcelain" for many years.

== The capture of Santa Catarina ==
At dawn on 25 February 1603 three Dutch ships under the command of Admiral Jacob van Heemskerck spotted the carrack at anchor off the Eastern coast of Singapore. The Portuguese ship, captained by Sebastian Serrão, was travelling from Macau to Malacca, loaded with products from China and Japan, including 1200 bales of Chinese raw silk, worth 2.2 million guilders. The cargo was particularly valuable because it contained several hundred ounces of musk. After a couple of hours of fighting, the Dutch managed to subdue the crew who forfeited the cargo and the ship, in return for the safety of their lives.

The Admiralty of Amsterdam's subsequent decision to take the ship and her cargo as a prize, despite Portugal's demands, became the casus belli for the Dutch–Portuguese War that lasted until 1663, and eventually ended the Portuguese monopoly on trade in the East Indies. The Dutch, who in previous years had learnt about the lucrative trade routes in the East, were now attempting to appropriate some of that wealth for themselves.

== Santa Catarina and Mare Clausum versus Mare Liberum controversy ==
Though Heemskerk did not have authorization from the company or the government to initiate the use of force, many shareholders were eager to accept the riches that he brought back to them. Not only was the legality of keeping the prize questionable under Dutch statute, but a faction of shareholders (mostly Mennonite) in the company also objected to the forceful seizure on moral grounds, and of course, the Portuguese demanded the return of their cargo. The scandal led to a public judicial hearing and a wider campaign to sway public (and international) opinion. It was in this wider context that representatives of the Company called upon jurist Hugo Grotius to draft a polemical defence of the seizure.

Grotius sought to ground his defense of the seizure in terms of the natural principles of justice. One chapter of his long theory-laden treatise entitled De Jure Prædæ made it to the press in the form of the influential pamphlet, Mare Liberum (The Free Sea).

In Mare Liberum, published in 1609, Grotius adapted the principle originally formulated by Francisco de Vitoria and further developed by Fernando Vázquez de Menchaca (cf. the School of Salamanca), that the sea was international territory, against the Portuguese Mare Clausum (closed sea) policy, and all nations were free to use it for seafaring trade. Grotius, by claiming 'free seas', provided suitable ideological justification for the Dutch breaking up of various trade monopolies through its formidable naval power.

England, competing fiercely with the Dutch for domination of world trade, opposed this idea, redefining the Mare Clausum principles. As conflicting claims grew out of the controversy, maritime states came to moderate their demands and base their maritime claims on the principle that it extended seawards from land. A workable formula was found by Cornelius Bynkershoek in his De dominio maris (1702), restricting maritime dominion to the actual distance within which cannon range could effectively protect it. This became universally adopted and developed into the three-mile limit.

== See also ==
- List of longest wooden ships
- Cinco Chagas
- Henry Grace à Dieu
- Baochuan
- Rahīmī
- Ganj-i-Sawai
- Javanese jong
- Macau incident (1601), the Dutch justification for the capture of the Santa Catarina
