= Law of the sea =

International law concerning maritime environments

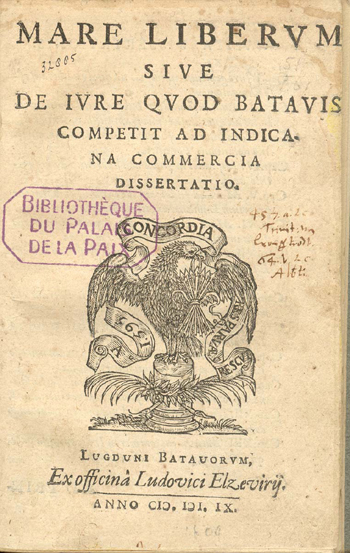
Mare Liberum (1609) by Hugo Grotius is one of the earliest works on law of the sea.

Law of the sea (or ocean law) is a body of international law governing the rights and duties of states in maritime environments. It concerns matters such as navigational rights, sea mineral claims, and coastal waters jurisdiction. The connotation of ocean law is somewhat broader, but the law of the sea (anchored in the United Nations Convention on the Law of the Sea (UNCLOS)) is so comprehensive that it covers all areas of ocean law as well (e.g., marine environmental law, maritime law).

While drawn from a number of international customs, treaties, and agreements, modern law of the sea derives largely from the United Nations Convention on the Law of the Sea. That convention is effective since 1994, and is generally accepted as a codification of customary international law of the sea, and is sometimes regarded as the "constitution of the oceans".

Law of the sea is the public law counterpart to admiralty law (also known as maritime law), which applies to private maritime issues, such as the carriage of goods by sea, rights of salvage, ship collisions, and marine insurance.

== History ==
Among the earliest examples of legal codes concerning maritime affairs is the Byzantine Lex Rhodia, promulgated between 600 and 800 C.E. to govern trade and navigation in the Mediterranean. Maritime law codes were also created during the European Middle Ages, such as the Rolls of Oléron, which drew from Lex Rhodia, and the Laws of Wisby, enacted among the mercantile city-states of the Hanseatic League.

However, the earliest known formulation of public international law of the sea was in 17th century Europe, which saw unprecedented navigation, exploration, and trade across the world's oceans. Portugal and Spain led this trend, staking claims over both the land and sea routes they discovered. Spain considered the Pacific Ocean a mare clausum—literally a "closed sea" off limits to other naval powers—in part to protect its possessions in Asia. Similarly, as the only known entrance from the Atlantic, the Strait of Magellan was periodically patrolled by Spanish fleets to prevent entrance by foreign vessels. The papal bull Romanus Pontifex (1455) recognized Portugal's exclusive right to navigation, trade, and fishing in the seas near discovered land, and on this basis the Portuguese claimed a monopoly on East Indian trade, prompting opposition and conflict from other European naval powers.

Amid growing competition over sea trade, Dutch jurist and philosopher Hugo Grotius—considered the father of international law generally—wrote Mare Liberum (The Freedom of the Seas), published in 1609, which set forth the principle that the sea was international territory and that all nations were thus free to use it for trade. He premised this argument on the idea that "every nation is free to travel to every other nation, and to trade with it." Thus, there was a right to innocent passage over land and a similar right of innocent passage at sea. Grotius observed that unlike land, on which sovereigns could demarcate their jurisdiction, the sea was akin to air, a common property of all:

The air belongs to this class of things for two reasons. First, it is not susceptible of occupation; and second its common use is destined for all men. For the same reasons the sea is common to all, because it is so limitless that it cannot become a possession of any one, and because it is adapted for the use of all, whether we consider it from the point of view of navigation or of fisheries.

Writing in response to Grotius, the English jurist John Selden argued in Mare Clausum that the sea was as capable of appropriation by sovereign powers as terrestrial territory. Rejecting Grotius' premise, Selden claimed there was no historical basis for the sea to be treated differently than land, nor was there anything inherent in the nature of the sea that precluded states from exercising dominion over parts of it. In essence, international law could evolve to accommodate the emerging framework of national jurisdiction over the sea.

"Mare clausum" in the European Age of Discovery

As a growing number of nations began to expand their naval presence across the world, conflicting claims over the open sea mounted. This prompted maritime states to moderate their stance and to limit the extent of their jurisdiction towards the sea from land. This was aided by the compromise position presented by Dutch legal theorist Cornelius Bynkershoek, who in De dominio maris (1702), established the principle that maritime dominion was limited to the distance within which cannons could effectively protect it.

Grotius' concept of "freedom of the seas" became virtually universal until the mid-20th century, following the global dominance of European naval powers. National rights and jurisdiction over the seas were limited to a specified belt of water extending from a nation's coastlines, usually three nautical miles (5.6 km), according to Bynkershoek's "cannon shot" rule. Under the mare liberum principle, all waters beyond national boundaries were considered international waters: Free to all nations, but belonging to none of them.

In the early 20th century, some nations expressed their desire to extend national maritime claims, namely to exploit mineral resources, protect fish stocks, and enforce pollution controls. To that end, in 1930, the League of Nations called conference at The Hague, but no agreements resulted. By the mid 20th century, technological improvements in fishing and oil exploration expanded the nautical range in which countries could detect and exploit natural resources. This prompted United States President Harry S. Truman in 1945 to extend American jurisdiction to all the natural resources of its continental shelf, well beyond the territorial waters of the country. Truman's proclamation cited the customary international law principle of a nation's right to protect its natural resources. Other nations quickly followed suit: Between 1946 and 1950, Chile, Peru, and Ecuador extended their rights to a distance of 200 nautical miles (370 km) to cover their Humboldt Current fishing grounds.

=== UN Convention of the Law of the Sea ===
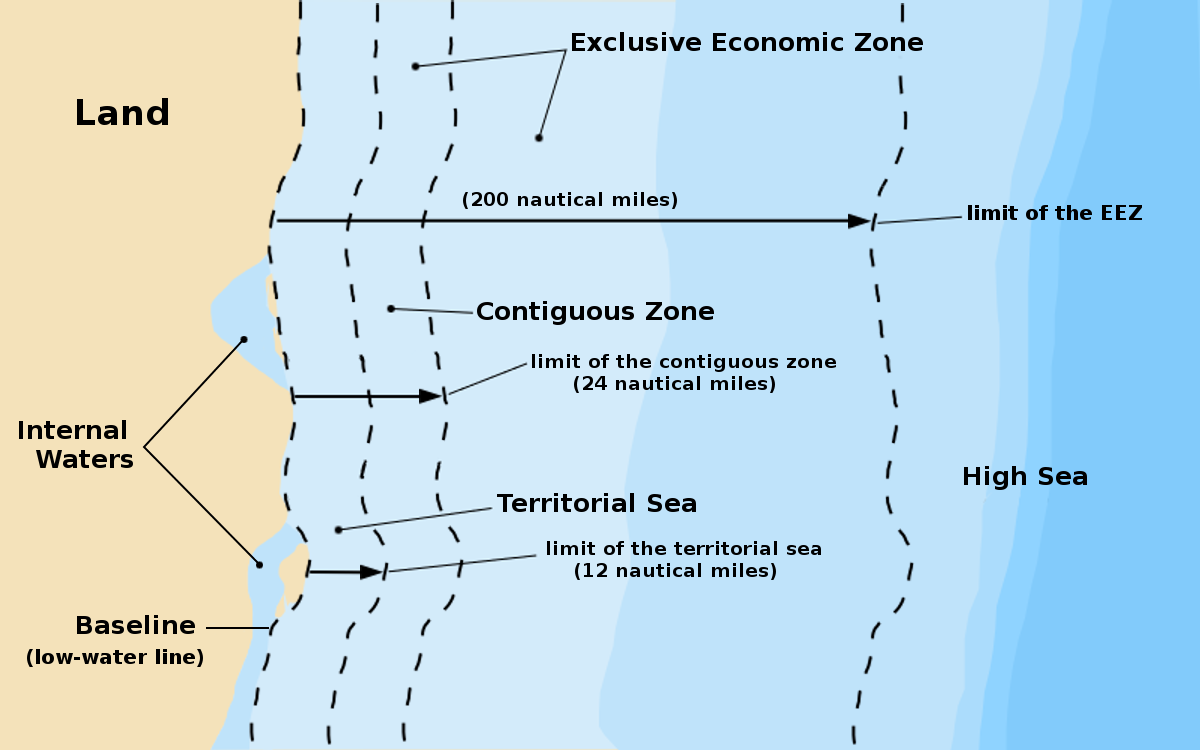
Maritime zones are a core component of modern law of the sea.

UNCLOS sea areas

The first attempt to promulgate and codify a comprehensive law of the sea was in the 1950s, shortly after the Truman proclamation on the continental shelf. In 1956, the United Nations held its first Conference on the Law of the Sea (UNCLOS I) in Geneva, Switzerland, which resulted in four treaties concluded in 1958:

- Convention on the Territorial Sea and Contiguous Zone, entry into force: 10 September 1964
- Convention on the Continental Shelf, entry into force: 10 June 1964
- Convention on the High Seas, entry into force: 30 September 1962
- Convention on Fishing and Conservation of Living Resources of the High Seas, entry into force: 20 March 1966

The Convention on the Continental Shelf effectively codified Truman's proclamation as customary international law. While UNCLOS I was widely considered a success, it left open the important issue of the extent of territorial waters. In 1960, the UN held a second Conference on the Law of the Sea ("UNCLOS II"), but this did not result in any new agreements. The pressing issue of varying claims of territorial waters was raised at the UN in 1967 by Malta, prompting in 1973 a third United Nations Conference on the Law of the Sea in New York City. In an attempt to reduce the possibility of groups of nation-states dominating the negotiations, the conference used a consensus process rather than majority vote. With more than 160 nations participating, the conference lasted until 1982, resulting in the UN Convention of the Law of the Sea, also known as the Law of the Sea Treaty, which defines the rights and responsibilities of nations in their use of the world's oceans.

UNCLOS introduced a number of provisions, of which the most significant concerned navigation, archipelagic status and transit regimes, exclusive economic zones (EEZs), continental shelf jurisdiction, deep seabed mining, the exploitation regime, protection of the marine environment, scientific research, and settlement of disputes. It also set the limit of various areas, measured from a carefully defined sea baseline.

The convention also codified freedom of the sea, explicitly providing that the oceans are open to all states, with no state being able to subject any part to its sovereignty. Consequently, state parties cannot unilaterally extend their sovereignty beyond their EEZ, the 200 nautical miles in which that state has exclusive rights to fisheries, minerals, and sea-floor deposits. "Innocent passage" is permitted through both territorial waters and the EEZ, even by military vessels, provided they do no harm to the country or break any of its laws.

Parties to the United Nations Convention on the Law of the Sea (as of June 2019): Parties Parties, dually represented by the European Union Non-parties that are signatories Non-parties that are not signatories

The convention came into force on 16 November 1994, one year after it was ratified by the 60th state, Guyana; the four treaties concluded in the first UN Conference in 1956 were consequently superseded. As of June 2019, UNCLOS has been ratified by 168 states. Many of the countries that have not ratified the treaty, such as the U.S., nonetheless recognize its provisions as reflective of international customary law. Thus, it remains the most widely recognized and followed source of international law with respect to the sea.

Between 2018 and 2020, there is a conference on a possible change to the law of the sea regarding conservation and sustainable use of marine biological diversity of areas beyond national jurisdiction (General Assembly resolution 72/249).

== Recognition and enforcement of law of the sea ==
A specialized agency of the United Nations, the International Maritime Organization, monitors and enforces certain provisions of the convention, along with the intergovernmental International Seabed Authority (ISA), which was established by the convention to organize, regulate and control all mineral-related activities in the international seabed area beyond territorial limits. UNCLOS established the International Tribunal for the Law of the Sea (ITLOS), based in Hamburg, Germany, to adjudicate all disputes concerning the interpretation or application of the convention (subject to the provisions of Article 297 and to the declarations made in accordance with article 298 of the convention). Its 21 judges are drawn from a wide variety of nations. Because the EEZ is so extensive, many ITLOS cases concern competing claims over the ocean boundaries between states As of 2017, ITLOS had settled 25 cases.

Other types of intergovernental organizations enforcing the law of the sea include UN FAO regional fishery bodies and arrangements, as well as UNEP regional seas conventions and action plans.

== Maritime law ==
Law of the sea should be distinguished from maritime law, which concerns maritime issues and disputes among private parties, such as individuals, international organizations, or corporations. However, the International Maritime Organisation, a UN agency that plays a major role in implementing law of the sea, also helps to develop, codify, and regulate certain rules and standards of maritime law.

== See also ==
- Custom of the Sea
- Nansen Institute
- Ocean governance
