= Mare clausum =

Sea that is under the exclusive jurisdiction of a nation

In international law, mare clausum (Note: (legal Latin meaning "closed sea")) is a sea, ocean or other navigable body of water under the jurisdiction of a state that is closed or not accessible to other states. Mare clausum is an exception to mare liberum (Latin for "free sea"), meaning a sea that is open to navigation to ships of all nations. In the generally accepted principle of international waters, oceans, seas, and waters outside national jurisdiction are open to navigation by all and referred to as "high seas" or mare liberum. Portugal and Spain defended a Mare clausum policy during the Age of Discovery. This was soon challenged by other European nations.

== History ==
From 30 BC to AD 117 the Roman Empire came to surround the Mediterranean by controlling most of its coasts. Romans started then to name this sea mare nostrum (Latin for "our sea"). At those times the period between November and March was considered the most dangerous for navigation, so it was declared "mare clausum" (closed sea), although bans on navigation were probably never enforced. In classical law the ocean was not territorial. However, since the Middle Ages maritime republics such the Republic of Genoa and the Republic of Venice claimed a "Mare clausum" policy in the Mediterranean. Nordic kingdoms and England also required passage rates, enforced monopolies on fishing, and blocked foreign ships in their neighboring seas.

=== Mare clausum in the Age of Discovery ===
Iberian 'mare clausum' in the Age of Discovery.

During the Age of Discovery, between the 15th and 17th century, sailing that had been mostly coastal became oceanic. Thus, the main focus was on long-haul routes. Countries of the Iberian Peninsula were pioneers in this process, seeking exclusive property and exploration rights over lands discovered and to be discovered. Given the amount of new lands and the resulting influx of wealth, the Kingdom of Portugal and the united kingdoms of Castile and Aragon began to compete openly. To avoid hostilities, they resorted to secrecy and diplomacy, marked by the signing of the Treaty of Alcáçovas in 1479 and the Treaty of Tordesillas in 1494.

The papacy helped legitimize and strengthen these claims, since Pope Nicholas V by the bull Romanus Pontifex of 1455 prohibited others to navigate the seas under the Portuguese exclusive without permission of the king of Portugal. The very titling of Portuguese kings announced this claim to the seas: "King of Portugal and the Algarves, within and beyond the sea in Africa, Lord of Commerce, Conquest and Shipping of Arabia, Persia and India". With the discovery of sea route to India and later the route of Manila the concept of "Mare clausum" in the treaty was realized. This policy was refused by European nations like France, Holland and England, who were then barred from expanding and trading, and engaged in privateering and piracy of routes, products and colonies.

In the 16th and 17th century Spain considered the Pacific Ocean a mare clausum – a sea closed to other naval powers. As the only known entrance from the Atlantic, the Strait of Magellan was at times patrolled by fleets sent to prevent entrance of non-Spanish ships. On the western end of the Pacific Ocean the Dutch threatened the Spanish Philippines. In the 1580s Spain attempted to settle and fortify the strait to deny entry to foreign navigation.

=== Mare clausum versus mare liberum ===
In February 1603 the seizing of 1500-ton loaded Portuguese Santa Catarina by the Dutch East India Company led to scandal with a public judicial hearing and a campaign to sway public (and international) opinion. The representatives of the Company then called Hugo Grotius, a jurist of the Dutch Republic, to draft a defence of the seizure.

In 1609 Hugo Grotius sought to ground his defense of the seizure in terms of the natural principles of justice; Grotius formulated a new principle that the sea was international territory and all nations were free to use it for seafaring trade. One chapter of his long theory-laden treatise entitled De Jure Prædæ made it to the press in the form of the influential pamphlet, Mare Liberum (The Free Sea). In it Grotius, by claiming 'free seas', provided suitable ideological justification for the Dutch breaking up of various trade monopolies through its formidable naval power (and then establishing its own monopoly).

Reaction followed. In 1625 Portuguese priest Serafim de Freitas published the book De Iusto Imperio Lusitanorum Asiatico (Of the Just Portuguese Asian Empire) addressing step by step the arguments of the Dutch. Despite his arguments, the international situation demanded an end to the Mare clausum policy, and freedom of the seas as an essential condition for the development of maritime trade.

England, competing fiercely with the Dutch for domination of world trade, opposed Grotius' ideas and claimed sovereignty over the waters around the British Isles. In Mare clausum (1635) John Selden coined the term, endeavoring to prove that the sea was in practice virtually as capable of appropriation as terrestrial territory. As conflicting claims grew out of the controversy, maritime states came to moderate their demands and base their maritime claims on the principle that it extended seawards from land. A workable formula was found by Cornelius van Bynkershoek in his De dominio maris (1702), restricting maritime dominion to the actual distance within which cannon range could effectively protect it. This became universally adopted and developed into the three-mile limit.

== General and cited references ==
- Prakash, Anand. "Origin and development of the law of the sea: history of international law revisited," Brill, 1983, ISBN 90-247-2617-4
- Ferreira, Ana Maria Pereira, O Essencial sobre Portugal e a Origem da Liberdade dos Mares, Lisboa, Imprensa Nacional Casa da Moeda, [sd] (Basics of Portugal and the Origin of Freedom of the Seas, in Portuguese).
- Merêa, Paulo, "Os Jurisconsultos Portugueses e a Doutrina do "Mare Clausum"", Revista de História, nº 49, Lisboa, 1924 ("The Jurists and the Doctrine of the Portuguese" "Mare clausum", Journal of History, in Portuguese)
- Saldanha, António Vasconcelos de, "Mare Clausum" Dicionário de História dos Descobrimentos Portugueses, vol. II, pp. II, pp. 685–86 (Dictionary of the History of Discoveries, in Portuguese).
- Tuck, Richard, Natural rights theories: their origin and development, Cambridge University Press, 1981, ISBN 0-521-28509-7
- van Ittersum, Martine Julia (2006). Hugo Grotius, Natural Rights Theories and the Rise of Dutch Power in the East Indies 1595–1615. Boston: Brill.
