= Macau Incident =

The Macau incident may refer to:

- Macau incident (1601), Portuguese execution of Dutch sailors during the Age of Discovery
- Macau Incident (1799), an encounter between a Franco-Spanish fleet and the British navy in the French Revolutionary Wars
