= Erwin Aichele =

German painter

- Born: 5 May 1887; German Empire
- Died: 29 June 1974 (aged 87)
- Occupation: Artist
- Spouse: Marie Charlotte Boedecker
- Children: 3

Erwin Aichele (5 May 1887 – 29 June 1974) was a German painter and animal artist from Baden-Württemberg in Southern Germany.

His life and work were the subject of a 1988 monograph, Der Tiermaler Erwin Aichele by Hans Schöner.

== Early years ==
Erwin Aichele studied fine art at the State Academy of Fine Arts Karlsruhe. He continued his studies in the Academy of Fine Arts, Munich, where he was taught by the celebrated animal artist Heinrich von Zügel. In 1911, Aichele passed his art teaching diploma and started work at the jewelry school in Pforzheim, Southern Germany.

== War years ==
In 1915, Aichele joined the army and was sent to France as part of a communications team. His talent in draughtsmanship came to the notice of his commanding officer and he was given the official function of war artist. Most of his surviving war drawings were executed in 1916 when, as part of the Third Battery FAR 185, he was stationed in Liry in Champagne. In June 1916, the troops moved to northern France.

Aichele's drawings depict places such as Achery, Doingt, Laon, Vraignes, Soissons. On each drawing he made a precise note of place, time and subject. His preferred media included pencil, ink, charcoal and coloured pastels. Although he witnessed the horrors of war, little of this appears in his drawings. They are dispassionate and betray no feelings of hate, horror or despair.

Aichele's last drawing in France is dated May 1918, shortly before a wound and nervous breakdown caused him to collapse into a coma. He was transferred to a military hospital in Polzen, Pomerania, and started drawing again during his convalescence. He returned home on the signature of the armistice.

== Career ==
Aichele resumed his teaching activities at Pforzheim's jewelry school. He also began painting again, focusing on wildlife and the semi-domesticated animals he reared. He worked in various media, including watercolours, oils, charcoal and pen and ink.

In 1934, Aichele was put in charge of the animal drawing class at the State Academy of Fine Arts Karlsruhe. He was professor of the academy between 1936 and 1944.

In 1940, Aichele left the Pforzheim jewelry school in order to teach at the town's School of Decorative Arts. His work was interrupted in the last years of the war when he was drafted into the Volksturm or Home Guard. He avoided joining the Nazi Party for the duration of the Third Reich. He continued to teach at the Institute of Decorative Art until 1952; he was director of the institute for some of this time.

In the 1950s, he increasingly turned towards abstraction, though still using animals as his models.

In 1931, Erwin, his wife, Marie Charlotte, and three children moved into their new home in the kuenstlerkolonie (artists colony) in the village of Eutingen, near Pforzheim. The house had an adjoining atelier and animal enclosures.

== Exhibitions ==
In 1921, he participated for the first time in an exhibition at the Glaspalast (Munich), (the Glass Palace in Munich). Afterwards, he took part in other group shows. His work was also displayed in solo exhibitions, especially in southern Germany.

In 1955, his work was exhibited in Paris for the first time.

== Honours ==
In 1974, Aichele was made honorary citizen of Eutingen. The main road in the kuenstlerkolonie was renamed Erwin-Aichele-Strasse.

In 1988, the Society of Fine Art in Pforzheim honoured him with a retrospective: to mark the occasion, the publishing house, Hans Schöner, published a monograph with reproductions of his works.

In 2009, an exhibition in southern Germany brought together the works of Aichele, his son, Wolfram Aichele and six of his artist grandchildren, Mathias Diebold, Nikolaus Diebold, Fridolin Diebold, Irmgard Jeserick, Benedikt Aichele and Alexandra Milton.

A book by British author, Giles Milton, Wolfram: The Boy Who Went To War, is an account of the Eutingen childhood and adolescent war years of his second son, artist Wolfram Aichele. It includes material about Aichele's life before and during the Third Reich.

== See also ==
- List of German painters
