= Wolfram Aichele =

German artist

Wolfram Aïchele
- Born: 29 April 1924; Freiburg im Breisgau, Germany
- Died: 9 June 2016 (aged 92); Paris, France
- Known for: Painting, sculpture
- Spouse: Barbara Aïchele

Wolfram Aïchele (29 April 1924 – 9 June 2016) was an artist from Baden-Württemberg in Southern Germany.

Son of the animal artist Erwin Aichele, Aïchele's Third Reich childhood is the subject of a 2011 book by the author and historian Giles Milton, who is also his son-in-law. Aïchele's work has been the subject of a number of critical studies

== Life ==
Aïchele's childhood was spent in the artists' colony of Eutingen, near Pforzheim in Baden-Württemberg. At the age of 17, Aïchele decided to train as a sculptor and was accepted on a four-year woodcarving course at the Bavarian State Woodcarving School in Oberammergau. In 1942, during the Second World War, he was conscripted into the German army and sent to the Crimea. Severe illness saw him transferred to a military hospital in Marienbad. Once recuperated, he was sent to Normandy where he served as a communications officer in the German 77th Infantry Division. He surrendered to American forces at the end of July, 1944 and spent the next two years as a prisoner of war, first in England and then in America.

He moved to Paris in 1956. In the late 1970s, Wolfram's work changed into a blend of figurative art and abstract art from the earlier Byzantine art.

Aïchele married in 1964 and has two children, the jeweller Benedikt Aichele, and the artist and illustrator, Alexandra Milton.

== See also ==
- List of German painters
