= Alexandra Milton =

- Born: June 4, 1967 (age 59); Paris
- Occupations: Artist and Illustrator
- Children: Three daughters

Alexandra Milton (born 4 June 1967 in Paris) is an artist and illustrator. She works primarily in collage.

The artwork in her debut children's book, Call Me Gorgeous, was nominated for the 2010 Kate Greenaway Medal.

The book was also a 2009 Book Start choice, distributed free to 100,000 children across the UK. In 2012, it was selected as one of the featured titles in the Book Trust's new Book Buzz programme.

Alexandra Milton is married to the writer and historian, Giles Milton, who wrote the text for Call Me Gorgeous and Good Luck Baby Owls.

== Personal life ==
She is the daughter of the German artist Wolfram Aichele and the granddaughter of Erwin Aichele.

Milton studied fine art at the Academie Charpentier in Paris.

== Published works ==
- Call Me Gorgeous 2009: ISBN 978-1-906250-71-3
- Good Luck Baby Owls Boxer Books, 2012.
- Who Is In The Egg? Boxer Books, 2020 ISBN 978-1912757626

Call Me Gorgeous was Milton's debut children's title. The book's artwork was nominated for the 2010 Kate Greenaway Medal. The book was selected for the 2009 Book Start programme.

The story of Call Me Gorgeous draws its inspiration from the culinary texts of the court of King Henry VIII; these record that chimerical monsters were stitched together from various animal parts and served to the king and his courtiers on feast days.
