= First Dutch Expedition to the East Indies =

First voyage of Dutch ships to Nusantara in 1595–1597

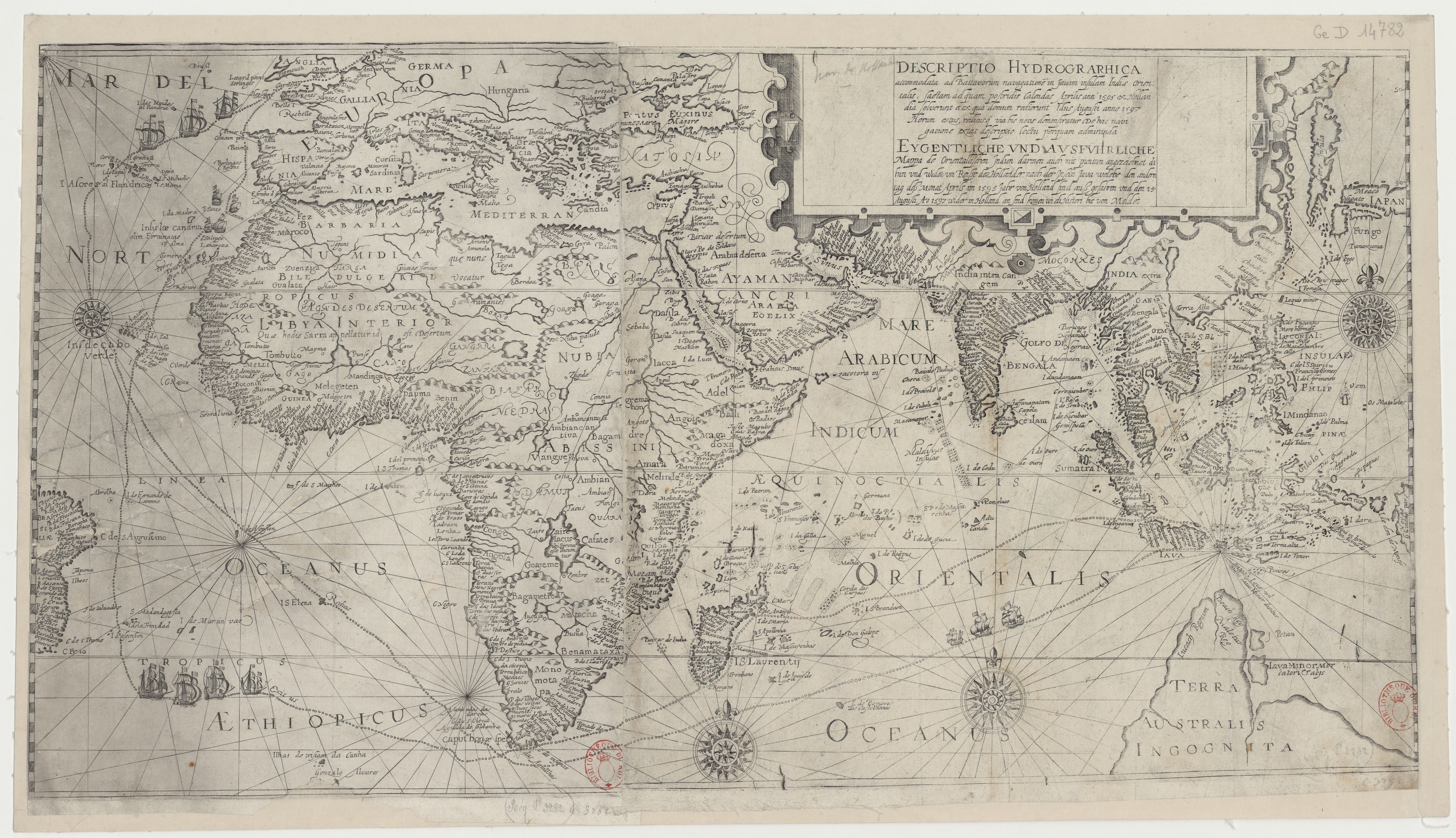
A 1599 map of the route of the fleet within the bounds of the Portuguese sphere under the treaties of Tordesillas and Zaragoza, displaying the Dutch geographical knowledge at the time.

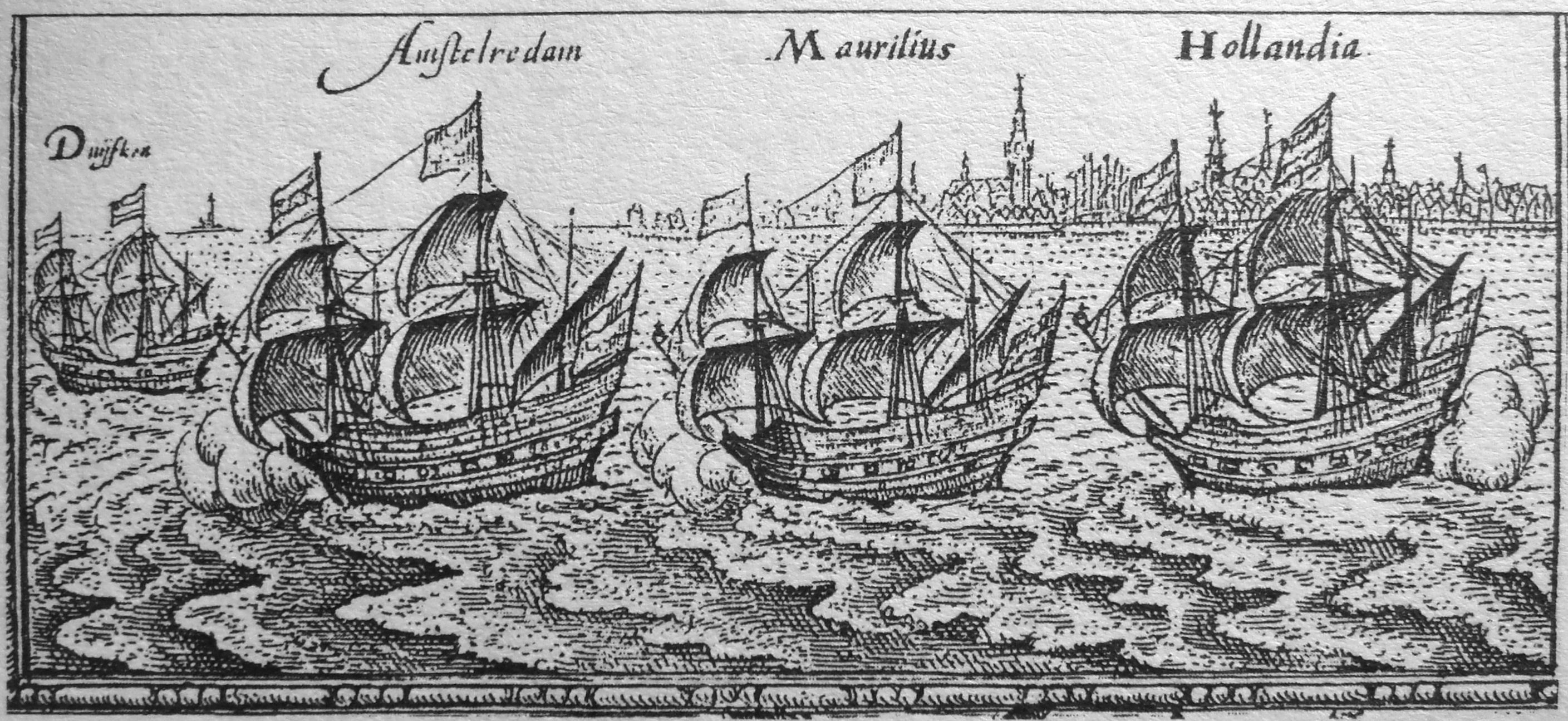
The fleet of Cornelis de Houtman.

The Banten sultanate.

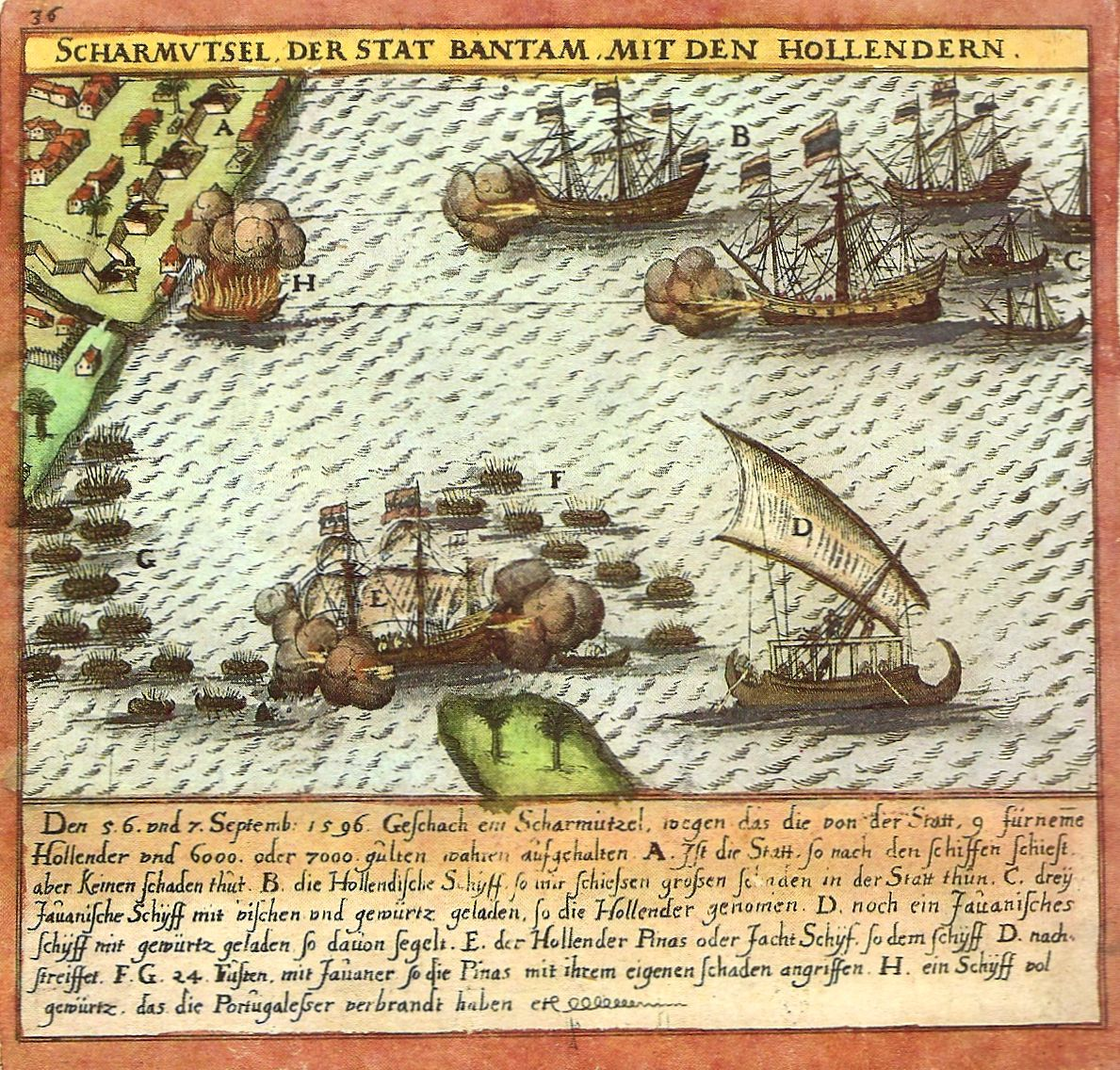
Shooting on the city of Bantam and attack of the prahus.

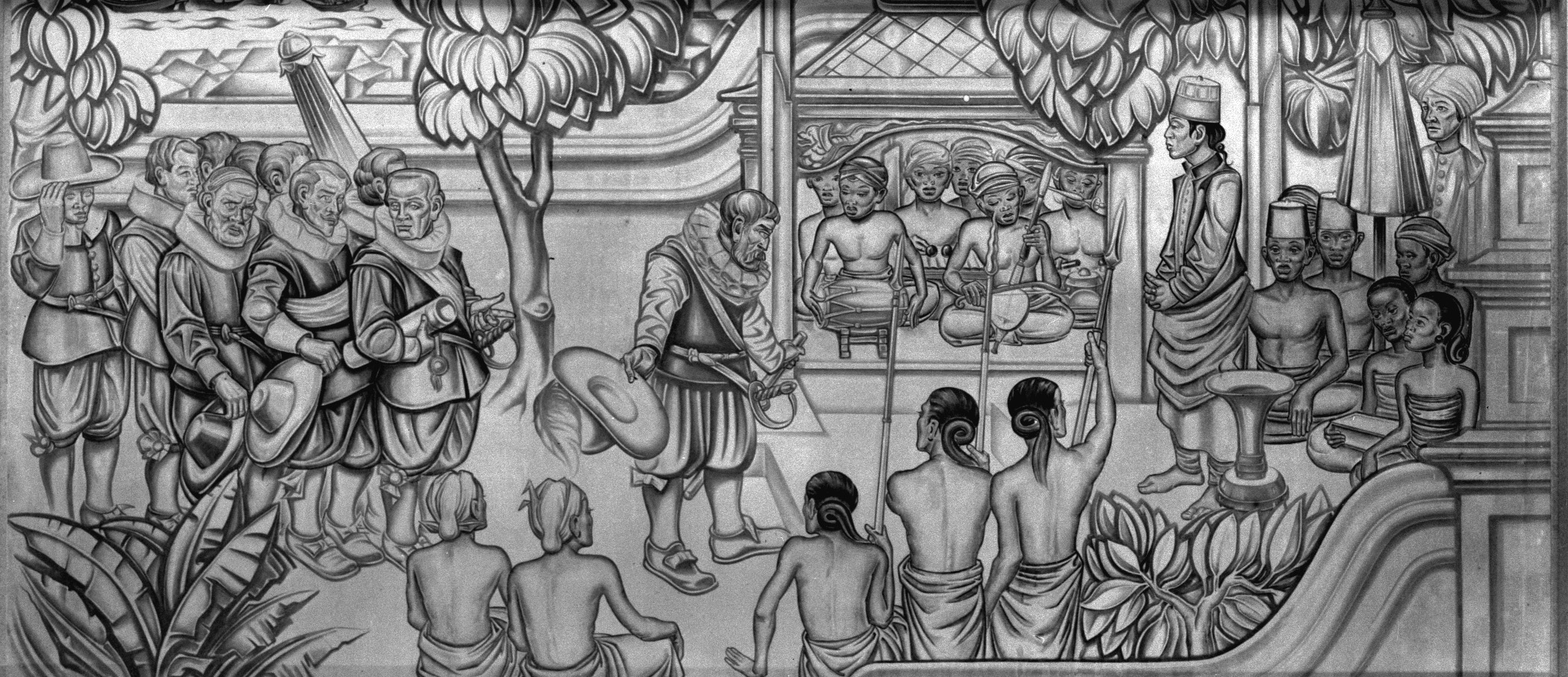
Wall painting La réception de Cornelis de Houtman a Java en 1595 by Paulides in the Dutch pavilion at the Colonial World Exhibition in Paris. Photo KIT.

The First Dutch Expedition to the East Indies (Dutch: Eerste Schipvaart) was an expedition that took place from 1595 to 1597 to the region that is now Indonesia. It was instrumental in opening up the East Indies spice trade to the merchants that eventually formed the Dutch East India Company, and marked the end of the Portuguese Empire's dominance in the region.

== Background ==
During the 16th century the spice trade was extremely lucrative, but the Portuguese Empire had a stranglehold on the source of the spices, Indonesia. For a time, the merchants of the Netherlands were content to accept this and buy all of their spice in Lisbon, Portugal, as they could still make a decent profit by reselling it throughout Europe. However, in the 1590s, Spain, which was at war with the Netherlands, was in a dynastic union with Portugal, thus making continued trade practically impossible. This was intolerable to the Dutch who would have been glad to circumvent the Portuguese monopoly and go straight to Indonesia, but the sailing directions needed in order to reach Indonesia were jealously guarded by the Portuguese.

However, in 1592 the cartographer Petrus Plancius published a series of charts showing, in exact detail, the route to the Indies. Soon after these charts were published, three Amsterdam merchants began meeting in secret, plotting an expedition to Indonesia. Their names were Jan Jansz Carel, Hendrick Hudde, and Reynier Pauw. One of the first things these men did was to send Pauw's cousin, Cornelis de Houtman, to Lisbon, posing as a merchant. His job was to confirm Plancius' charts and see if he could find any more information on the East Indies. Then, in September 1592, Jan Huyghen van Linschoten returned from an extended stay in Goa, India, and soon after, in collaboration with noted traveller Bernardus Paludanus, he published an account of his journeys that included a large amount of information on the East Indies that confirmed all of Plancius' charts and added more besides. In early 1594, de Houtman returned from Lisbon.

The Amsterdam merchants now had all of the information they needed, and they set about raising capital to fund the expedition. They recruited six other merchants and with them formed the Compagnie van Verre ('Far-distance Company'): Pieter Hasselaer, Jan Poppen, Hendrick Buick, Dirk van Os, Syvert Sem, and Arend ten Grootenhuys. The company was able to raise 290,000 guilders (equivalent to €13 million in 2024) and used it to build and equip four ships: Mauritius, Amsterdam, Hollandia, and Duifje.

All told, there were 248 officers and men on the expedition. The ship's government was to be carried out by a Ships' Council consisting of the skippers of the ships, merchants who were assigned to each ship, and a few others. Some had preferred status, allowing them to speak first on an issue and break a tie; Cornelis de Houtman was one of these. Before the ships left, all of the navigators were trained by Petrus Plancius. The chief navigator was Pieter Dirkszoon Keyser.

== Voyage ==
The fleet sailed from the port of Texel on 2 April 1595. They made good time at first, passing the Canary Islands on 26 April and landing at the Isla de Mayo on 19 April, but soon the wind died, and they were able to make only slow progress. They did not cross the equator until 4 June, and did not sight Africa until 2 August. In October, they landed at Madagascar, where they were forced to stay for six months, losing many men to illness; by the time they left, 71 men had died. Among the dead was the skipper of Hollandia, Jan Dignumsz. His death set off a bitter feud over who would succeed that ended only when one of the officers, Gerrit van Beuningen, was put in irons for the remainder of the voyage.

=== At Bantam ===
Map of the Banten Sultanate, strategically located, which wore on until formal Dutch annexation in 1813.

In June 1596, the fleet reached Bantam (Banten), Java, but were received poorly due to the machinations of the Portuguese, who persuaded the Bantamese to raise their prices to absurdly high levels. They were also denied access to water, and when some of them went to Sumatra to get more, a number of men, including de Houtman, were captured and held until ransomed. De Houtman, by this time, was the de facto leader of the expedition, most of his opponents having been either killed or disgraced by this time. After being ransomed, he bombarded the city with cannon fire and raided several spice-carrying ships coming into Bantam from Banda and Borneo. Outraged, the Bantamese, sent men throughout the surrounding islands, warning them about the Dutch. At Sidayu, near Surabaya, the ships were boarded by natives and twelve men were killed in the ensuing battle, including the skipper of Amsterdam. Soon after, at Madura, when the royal family sailed out to meet to Dutch, Amsterdam opened fire, killing the prince, the priest, and many others.

=== Return home ===
At this point, the entire expedition was on the brink of disaster. Only 94 of the original 248 men were still alive, and the leaders were split into two factions, one led by de Houtman and the other by Jan Meulenaer, who disagreed on where the fleet should go next. When Meulenaer suddenly died under mysterious circumstances, de Houtman was seized and put on trial by the Ships' Council. On grounds of insufficient evidence, he was released, but by this time Amsterdam was in such bad condition that it had to be set adrift and burnt. The fleet was in such bad shape that it was decided to head south, making one last stop at Bali, and then sail back to the Netherlands. The crew found Bali to be quite amiable, and set sail for home on 26 February 1597, reaching Texel on 14 August of the same year.

== Results ==
Although the expedition did not bring back as much as expected – 245 bags of pepper, 41 tonnes (45 short tons) of nutmeg, and 30 bales of mace – spice prices had become so inflated that the expedition was still profitable. All in all, the voyage suffered from bad leadership, but was still instrumental in opening up the East Indies to the Dutch.

== See also ==
- Second Dutch Expedition to the East Indies
- 1601 East India Company Voyage
- Dutch East India Company in Indonesia

== Sources ==
- Huygens Institute (2025). "The Dutch East India Company's shipping between the Netherlands and Asia 1595-1795". Huygens Instituut. Huygens Institute for the History of the Netherlands.
- Masselman, George (1963). The Cradle of Colonialism. New Haven: Yale University Press. LCCN 63007939. OCLC 242863. OL 5877706M.
- Milton, Giles (1999). Nathaniel's Nutmeg or, The True and Incredible Adventures of the Spice Trader Who Changed the Course of History. New York: Penguin Books. ISBN 0-374-21936-2.
- Winchester, Simon (2003). Krakatoa: The Day the World Exploded, August 27, 1883. New York: HarperCollins. ISBN 0-06-621285-5.
