= Mare Liberum =

Book by Hugo Grotius

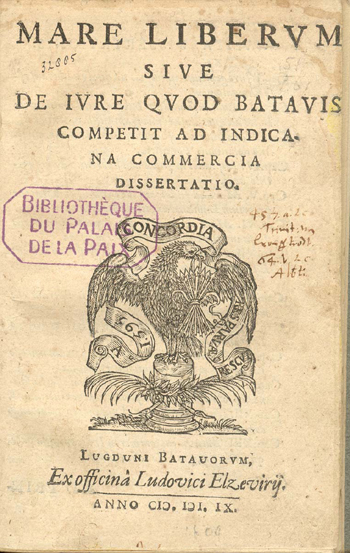
- The title page of the copy of Grotius' Mare Liberum in the Peace Palace Library
- Author: Hugo Grotius
- Original title: Mare Liberum, sive de jure quod Batavis competit ad Indicana commercia dissertatio
- Translator: Richard Hakluyt
- Language: Latin
- Subject: Law of the sea
- Genre: Law
- Publisher: Lodewijk Elzevir
- Publication date: 1609
- Publication place: Dutch Republic
- English publication date: 2004
- OCLC: 21552312

Mare Liberum (or The Freedom of the Seas) is a book in Latin on international law written by the Dutch jurist and philosopher Hugo Grotius, first published in 1609. In The Free Sea, Grotius formulated the new principle that the sea was international territory and all nations were free to use it for seafaring trade. The disputation was directed towards the Portuguese Mare clausum policy and their claim of monopoly on the East Indian Trade.

== Background and thesis ==
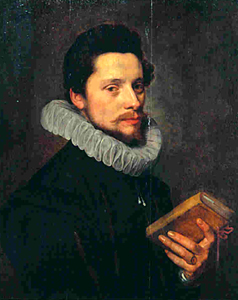
A 1608 portrait of Grotius at age 25 by Michiel Jansz van Mierevelt

Grotius wrote the treatise while being a counsel to the Dutch East India Company over the controversial seizing of the Portuguese carrack Santa Catarina. (Note: At dawn of February 25, 1603 three ships of the Dutch East India Company (V.O.C) seized Santa Catarina (ship), a Portuguese merchant carrack. It was such a rich prize that its sale proceeds doubled the capital of the V.O.C. The legality of keeping the prize was questionable under Dutch statute and the Portuguese demanded the return of their cargo. The scandal led to a public judicial hearing and a wider campaign to sway public (and international) opinion. As a result Hugo Grotius was called, providing a suitable ideological justification for the Dutch breaking up trade monopolies through its formidable naval power.) The work was assigned to Grotius by the Zeeland Chamber of the Dutch East India Company in 1608.

Grotius' argument was that the sea was free to all, and that nobody had the right to deny others access to it. In chapter I, he laid out his objective, which was to demonstrate "briefly and clearly that the Dutch [...] have the right to sail to the East Indies", and, also, "to engage in trade with the people there". He then went on to describe how he based his argument on what he called the "most specific and unimpeachable axiom of the Law of Nations, called a primary rule or first principle, the spirit of which is self-evident and immutable", namely that: "Every nation is free to travel to every other nation, and to trade with it." From this premise, Grotius argued that this self-evident and immutable right to travel and to trade required (1) a right of innocent passage over land, and (2) a similar right of innocent passage at sea. The sea, however, was more like air than land, and was, as opposed to land, common property of all:

The air belongs to this class of things for two reasons. First, it is not susceptible of occupation; and second its common use is destined for all men. For the same reasons the sea is common to all, because it is so limitless that it cannot become a possession of any one, and because it is adapted for the use of all, whether we consider it from the point of view of navigation or of fisheries.

== Publication history ==
Mare Liberum was published by Elzevier in the spring of 1609. It has been translated into English twice. The first translation was by Richard Hakluyt, and was completed some time between the publication of Mare Liberum in 1609 and Hakluyt's death in 1616. However, Hakluyt's translation was only published for the first time in 2004 under the title The Free Sea as part of Liberty Fund's "Natural Law and Enlightenment Classics" series. The second translation was by Ralph Van Deman Magoffin, associate professor of Greek and Roman History at Johns Hopkins University. This translation was a part of a debate on free shipping during the First World War, and was published by the Carnegie Endowment for International Peace and Oxford University Press in 1916 as The Freedom of the Seas, Or, The Right Which Belongs to the Dutch to Take Part in the East Indian Trade.
