= Company rule in the Dutch East Indies =

Early Dutch colonization in the East Indies

Dutch East Indies (Note: Known as the "Dutch Indies" or "Dutch East Indies" in official VOC documents. Also called the Netherlands East Indies, Netherlands Indies, or simply "The Indies".) Nederlandsch-Indië (Dutch)
- 1610–1800
- Flag; 1630 Corporate logo

- The territorial evolution of Dutch control in the Malay Archipelago from 1603 to 1800.
- Status: Governorates of the Dutch East India Company
- Capital: Amboina (1610–1619); Batavia (1619–1800)
- Common languages: Dutch, Malay, Javanese, Chinese, Indigenous languages
- Government: Colonial government
- Governor-general
  - 1610–1614: Pieter Both
  - 1796–1801 (Note: Although the VOC, along with its control over the East Indies, was dissolved in 1800, Overstraten maintained his position as governor-general in the new Dutch East Indies colony until his death in 1801.): Pieter Gerardus van Overstraten
- Historical era: Early modern
  - Established: 1610
  - Batavia founded: 30 May 1619
  - Dissolution and nationalization: 1800
Preceded by	Succeeded by
Portuguese colonization	Dutch East Indies

Dutch East India Company rule in the East Indies
- 1610–1800
Portuguese colonization	Dutch East Indies
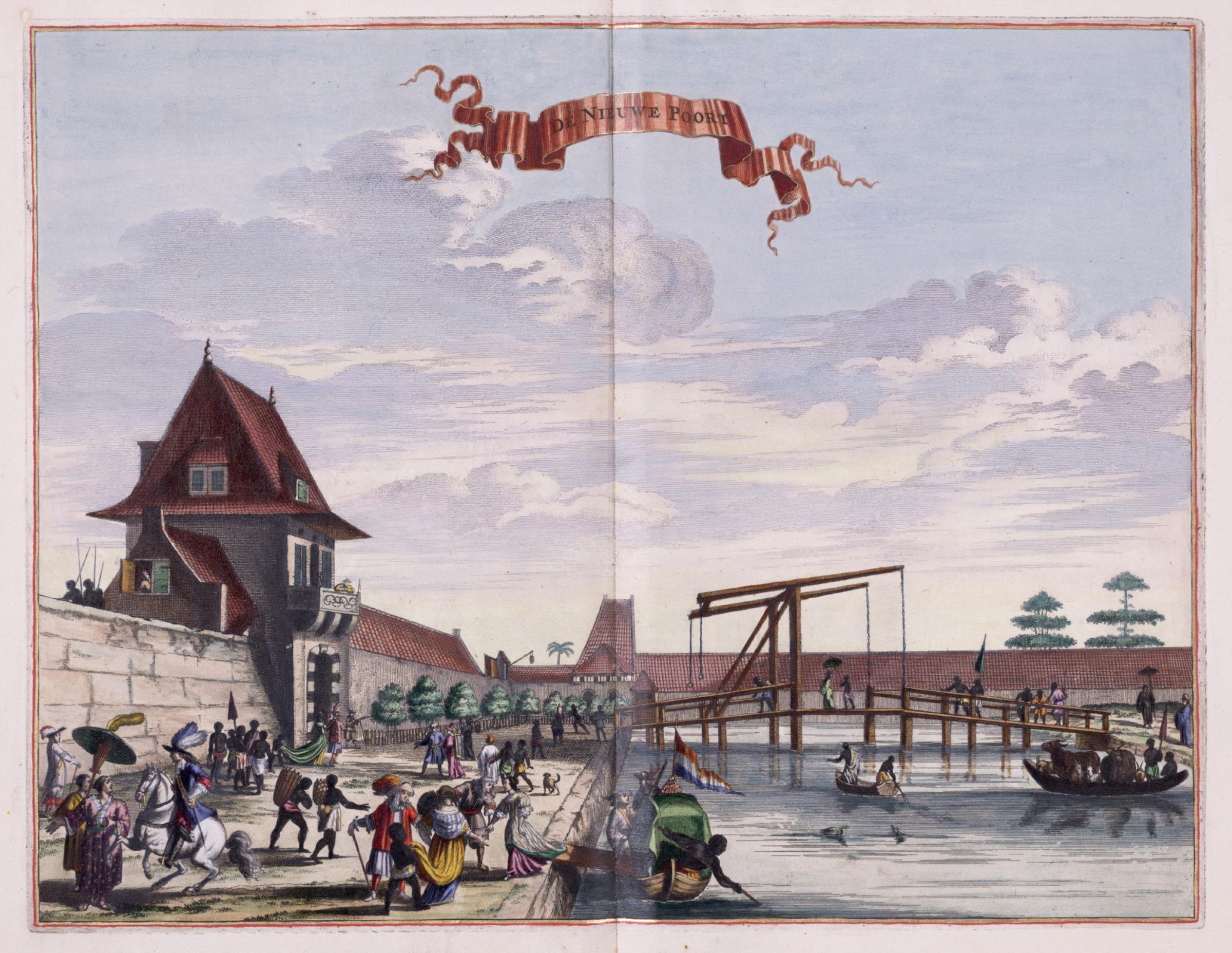
- Batavia built in what is now Jakarta, 1682
- Location: East Indies
- Including: First Dutch Expedition to East Indies
- Leader(s): Pieter Both (1610–1614); Pieter Gerardus van Overstraten (1796–1801)

Company rule in the Dutch East Indies began when the Dutch East India Company appointed the first governor-general of the Dutch East Indies in 1610, and ended in 1800 when the bankrupt company was dissolved and its possessions were nationalized as the Dutch East Indies. By then it exerted territorial control over much of the archipelago, most notably on Java.

In 1603, the first permanent Dutch trading post in Indonesia was established in Banten, northwest Java. The official East Indies government, however, was not created until Pieter Both was made governor-general in 1610. In that same year, Ambon Island was made headquarters of the VOC's East Indies. Batavia was made the capital from 1619 onward.

Corruption, war, smuggling, and mismanagement resulted in the company's bankruptcy by the end of the 18th century. The company was formally dissolved in 1800 and its colonial possessions were nationalized by the Batavian Republic as the Dutch East Indies.

== Background ==
A 1596 Dutch expedition lost half its crew, killed a Javanese prince and lost a ship but returned to the Dutch Republic with a load of spices, the profit from which encouraged other expeditions.

Recognising the potential of the East Indies spice trade, and to prevent competition eating into Dutch profits, the Dutch government amalgamated the competing merchant companies into the United East India Company (VOC). In 1602, the States General of the Netherlands granted it a 21-year monopoly in the spice trade in Asia. It was awarded quasi-governmental powers, including the ability to wage war, imprison and execute convicts, negotiate treaties, coin money, and establish colonies.

== Early settlements ==
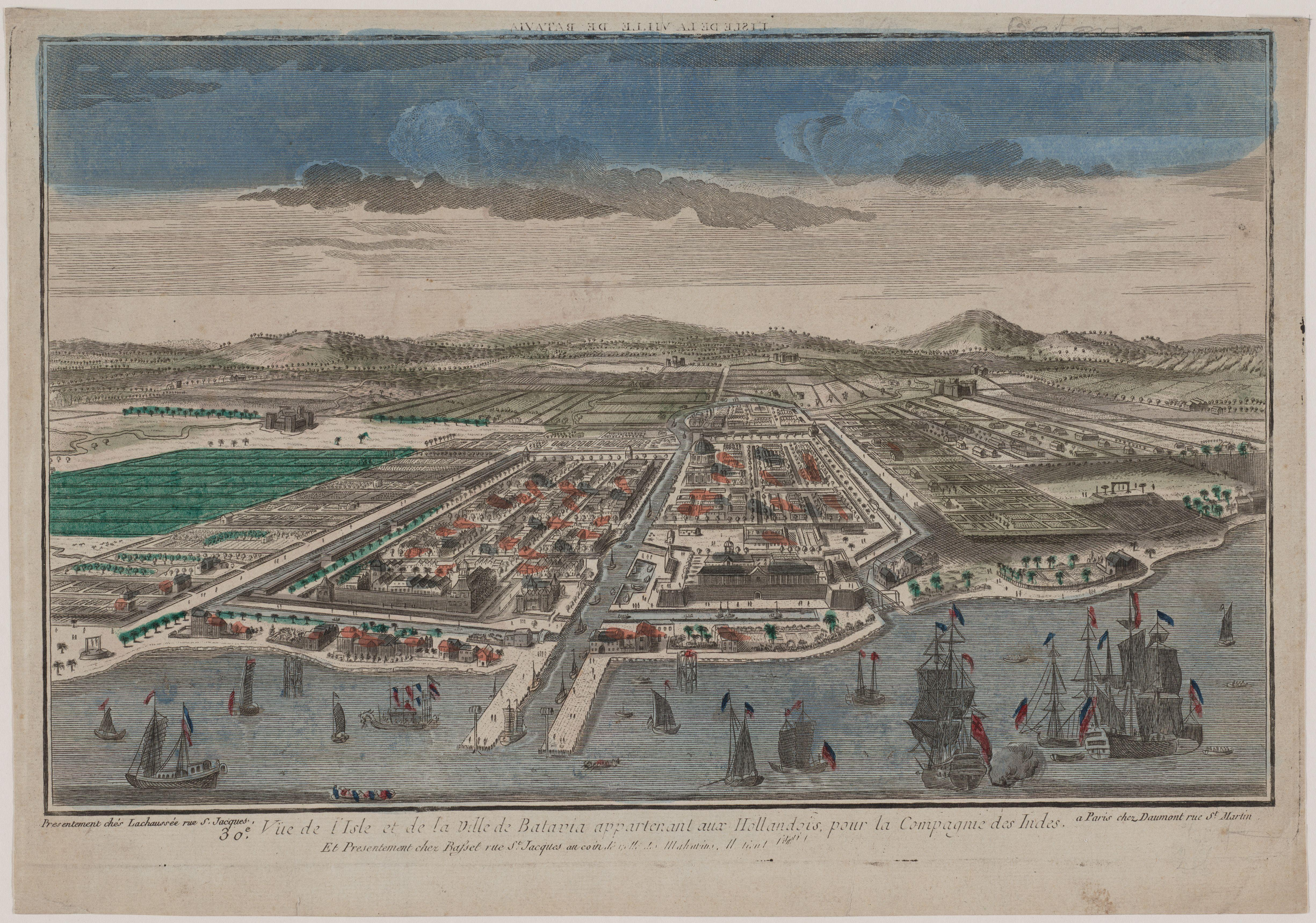
View of the Island and the City of Batavia Belonging to the Dutch, for the India Company

In 1603, the first permanent Dutch trading post in Indonesia was established in Banten, northwest Java, and in 1611, another was established at Jayakarta (later renamed 'Batavia' and then 'Jakarta').

VOC headquarters were in Ambon Island from 1610 to 1619, and although this was located centrally in the spice production areas, it was far from the Asian trade routes and other VOC activity ranging from Africa to Japan. A location in the west of the archipelago was thus sought; while the Straits of Malacca were strategic, the Portuguese conquest had made them dangerous, and the first permanent VOC settlement in Banten was difficult due to control by a powerful local ruler and competition from Chinese and English traders.

In 1604, a second English East India Company (EIC) voyage to Maluku, and subsequent establishments of trading posts between 1611 and 1617 across the archipelago began Anglo-Dutch competition for access to spices as the Dutch monopolistic ambitions were threatened. Diplomatic agreements and Anglo-Dutch co-operation over the spice trade ended with the Amboyna massacre where ten EIC employees were tortured and killed by the Dutch, following which the English withdrew from their Indonesian activities (except in Banten).

In 1619, Jan Pieterszoon Coen was appointed governor-general of the VOC. On 30 May 1619, Coen, backed by a force of nineteen ships, stormed Jayakarta, driving out the Banten forces, and from the ashes, established Batavia as the VOC headquarters.

== Expansion ==
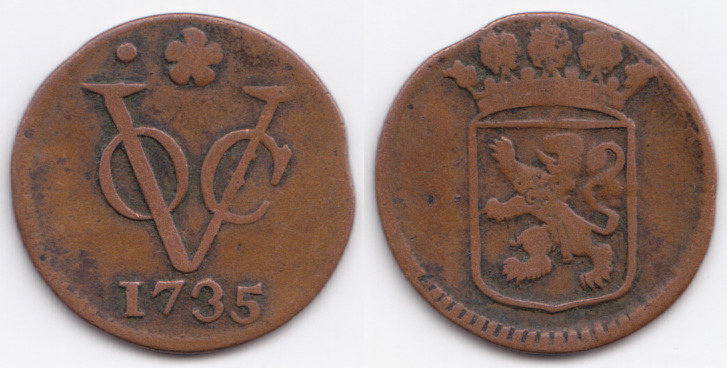
A 1735 Dutch East India Company Duit

Coen's plans had included making Batavia the centre of intra-Asian trade spanning from Japan to China, Burma, Indonesian archipelago, and Ceylon as far as Persia, by employing Ambonese mercenary and Chinese labour to develop the spice trade. Although this plan was never realised, Coen managed to establish a Dutch monopoly of the spice trade through an alliance with Ternate Sultanate in 1607 to control the production of cloves, and the occupation of the Banda Islands gave control of the nutmeg trade. The Dutch captured Melaka from the Portuguese in 1641 giving them control of the region's seas. Beginning in 1600, the Dutch came into conflict with the Spanish in the region. Several Dutch fleets attempted to invade the Spanish Philippines but failed, and peace was established in 1648 through the Peace of Westphalia.

By the mid-17th century, Batavia had become an important trade centre. It had repelled attacks from the Javanese Mataram kingdom. The Dutch defeated the Sulawesi city of Makassar in 1667, thus bringing its trade under VOC control. Sumatran ports were also brought under VOC control, and the last of the Portuguese were expelled in 1660. In return for monopoly control over the pepper trade and the expulsion of the EIC, the Dutch helped the son of the ruler of Banten overthrow his father in 1680.

VOC policy at this time was to concentrate on its trading posts and to not become involved in costly territorial conquest. However, the company became deeply involved in the internal politics of Java in this period, and fought in a number of wars involving the leaders of Mataram and Banten (Bantam). The VOC reached an accord with the susuhunan (king) of Mataram, Java's dominant kingdom, that only allowed Dutch ships to trade within the archipelago.

Although they failed to gain complete control of the Indonesian spice trade, they had much more success than the previous Portuguese efforts. They exploited the factionalisation of the small kingdoms in Java that had replaced Majapahit, establishing a permanent foothold in Java, from which grew a land-based colonial empire which became one of the world's richest colonial possessions.

== Subject population ==
According to the "first somewhat reliable census of population", the Dutch-controlled regions of the East Indies contained slightly over 2 million inhabitants by 1795, with 1.5 million of these living on Java's northeastern coast. Later censuses suggested this number to be slightly underestimated. Counting its other territories such as Ceylon, modern research indicates that the overall size of the VOC subject population increased from 453,000 to 503,000 in the late seventeenth century to 2,445,000–2,902,000 in the late eighteenth century. In the late 17th century, the bulk of these (300,000) lived on Ceylon, while by the late 18th century, Dutch Ceylon's population was 350,000–817,000 compared to their 2 million Javanese subjects (with the rest of their subjects living on other Malay islands, plus a minor population of 25,000 settlers in the Cape Colony).

== Impacts ==
The most profound VOC impact on Indonesian native polities was their technology, especially in weaponry and shipping. With this technology they were able to assert relative superiority upon native kingdoms, especially in the Moluccas and Java. Although firearms and cannons were already brought by previous European colonisers, the Portuguese, it was the Dutch VOC that used them quite extensively in their conquest on the Indonesian archipelago, as well as wrestled some of Portuguese ports and colonies in Asia, such as Malacca, Ceylon, and Ambon. The VOC was involved deeper into the Mataram court's intrigue and exploited the Javanese royalties tendencies to disintegrate, allowing them to gain a firm foothold in Java.

Another VOC tremendous impact was the change of trade systems in the Indonesian archipelago. By enforcing the monopoly policy on spice trade, VOC had to eradicate the previous trading system where large numbers of ports, kingdoms and traders participated. This led to the opposition of Asian trading polities, which made the VOC involved in a series of battles and conquests.

VOC personnel lived separate to indigenous Indonesians, and Dutch people ranked low in indigenous status systems. As such, while the VOC introduced objects, techniques, and corporate organisation into Indonesian society, its impact on Indonesian thinkers was minimal. Rather, at a time when Europe was denouncing autocratic rule, hierarchy and hereditary rights, the VOC borrowed these values from Indonesian societies. Governors-general acted like royalty and did not leave the enclaves they had established, and like Indonesian royalty, they employed the local nobility and Chinese agents to organise labour.
