= Three-mile limit =

Historical definition of a nation's territorial waters

The three-mile limit refers to a traditional and now largely obsolete conception of the international law of the seas which defined a country's territorial waters, for the purposes of trade regulation and exclusivity, as extending as far as the reach of cannons fired from land.

In Mare Clausum (1635), John Selden endeavoured to prove that the sea was in practice virtually as capable of appropriation as terrestrial territory. As conflicting claims grew out of the controversy, maritime states came to moderate their demands and base their maritime claims on the principle that it extended seawards from land. A workable formula was found by Cornelius Bynkershoek in his De dominio maris (1702), restricting maritime dominion to the actual distance within which cannon range could effectively protect it. Most maritime nations adopted this principle, which developed into a limit of 3 nautical miles (5.6 km). It has also been suggested that the three-mile limit derived, at least in some cases, from the general application of the league (a common unit of measurement at sea) rather than from the range of cannon. It is also close to the distance to the visible horizon as observed from sea level by a person about six feet tall, so is the limit of what is visible from land.

Since the mid-20th century, numerous nations have claimed territorial waters well beyond the traditional three-mile limit. Commonly these maritime territories extend 12 nautical miles (22 km) from a coastline, and this was eventually established as the international norm by the 1982 United Nations Convention on the Law of the Sea. As a result, the three-mile limit has become largely obsolete. As of 2021, only the Coral Sea Islands, Gibraltar, Greenland, Jordan, and Singapore retain it.

== See also ==
- Admiralty law
- Gambling ship
- Hugo Grotius
- Territorial waters
