= Freedom of the seas =

Customary international maritime law

Freedom of the seas is a principle in the law of the sea. It stresses freedom to navigate the oceans. It also disapproves of war fought in water. The freedom is to be breached only in a necessary international agreement.

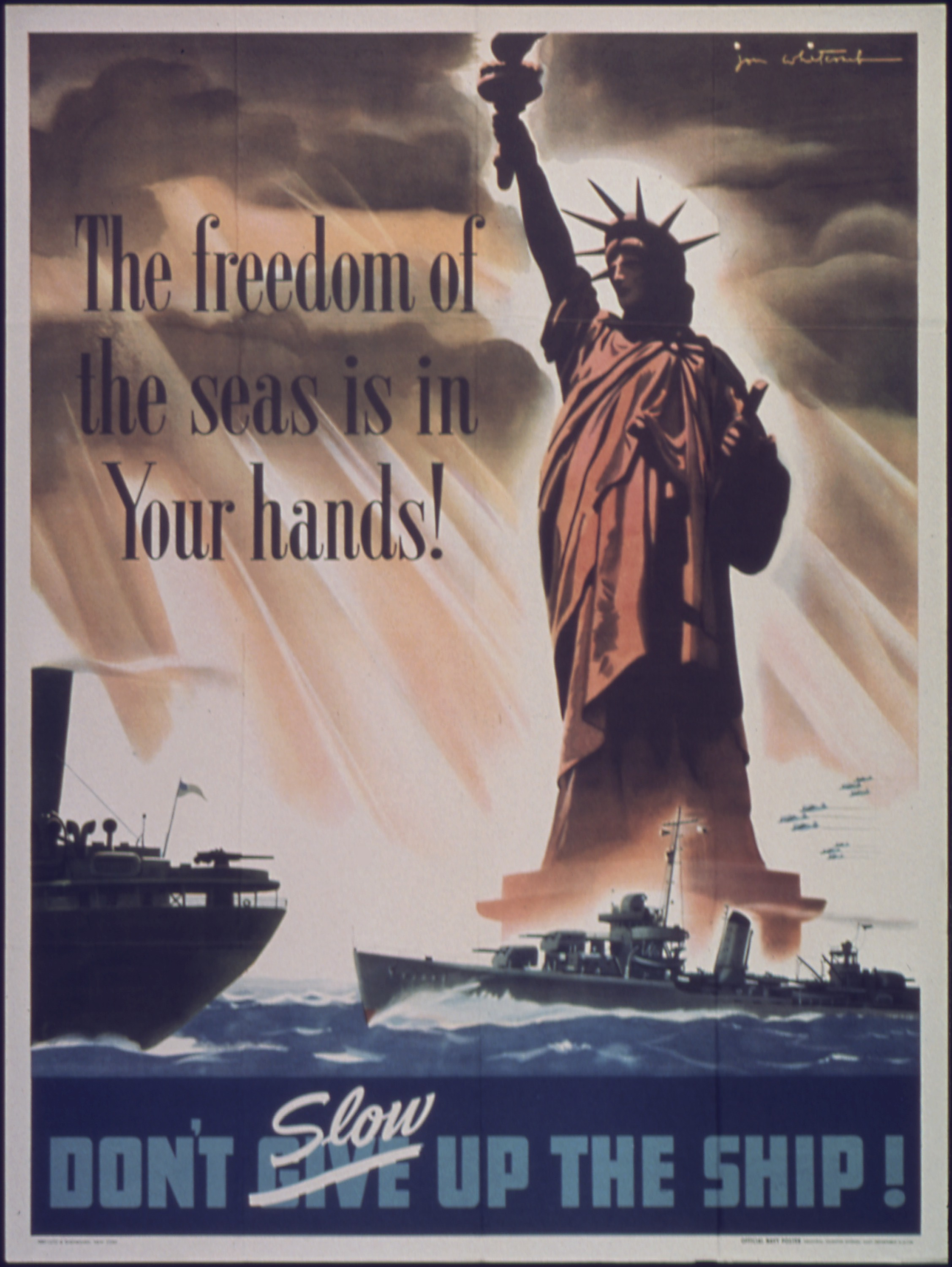
Freedom of the Seas, World War II US poster

This principle was one of U.S. President Woodrow Wilson's Fourteen Points proposed during the First World War. In his speech to the Congress, the president said:

Absolute freedom of navigation upon the seas, outside territorial waters, alike in peace and in war, except as the seas may be closed in whole or in part by international action for the enforcement of international covenants.

The United States' allies Britain and France were opposed to this point, as the United Kingdom was also a considerable naval power at the time. As with Wilson's other points, freedom of the seas was rejected by the German government.

Today, the concept of "freedom of the seas" can be found in the United Nations Convention on the Law of the Sea under Article 87(1) which states: "the high seas are open to all states, whether coastal or land-locked". Article 87(1) (a) to (f) gives a non-exhaustive list of freedoms including navigation, overflight, the laying of submarine cables, building artificial islands, fishing and scientific research.

== Historical background ==
Between the end of the 15th century up until the 17th century various powers claimed sovereignty over parts of the sea. In 1609, Dutch jurist and philosopher Hugo Grotius wrote what is considered the foundation of international legal doctrine regarding the seas and oceans – Mare Liberum, a Latin title that translates to "freedom of the seas". The Grotian concept of "freedom of the sea" was only accepted after a century long debate between Grotius' ideas and John Selden's.

While it is generally assumed that Grotius first propounded the principle of freedom of the seas, countries in the Indian Ocean and other Asian seas accepted the right of unobstructed navigation long before Grotius wrote his De Jure Praedae (On the Law of Spoils) in the year of 1604. Previously, in the 16th century, Spanish theologian Francisco de Vitoria postulated the idea of freedom of the seas in a more rudimentary fashion under the principles of jus gentium.

During World War II, nations started to expand and claim many resources and water territories all over their surrounding coasts. There were four international treaties meticulously drafted in the late 1950s and onto the 1970s, but the issues were not resolved between nations until 1982 when the United Nations Convention on the Law of the Sea was introduced.

UNCLOS is a Law of the Sea treaty: an agreement of rights and responsibilities of nations and their use of the world's ocean with guidelines of trade, environment, and the management of marine and open seas resources. UNCLOS replaced the four international treaties drafted in the late 1950s through 1970s. As of 2013, 165 countries and the European Union have joined the convention.

== High seas and registration ==
According to international law, Article 92 of the convention which describes ships shall sail under the flag of one state only and, save in exceptional cases expressly provided for in international treaties or in this convention, shall be subject to its exclusive jurisdiction on the high seas; however, when a ship is involved in certain criminal acts, such as piracy, any nation can exercise jurisdiction under the doctrine of universal jurisdiction. High seas were defined as any part of the sea that was not either territorial sea or internal waters, territorial waters and exclusive economic zones. Article 88 of the 1982 Convention states that the high seas shall be reserved for peaceful purposes. Many countries engage in military maneuvers and the testing of conventional weapons and nuclear weapons on the high seas. In order to deliver the right punishment to the right person or state, ships must be registered to a country to show proof of ownership. The owner of the vessel sometimes prefers to pay the lower registration fees by picking countries such as Panama, Bermuda, Italy, Malta and the Netherlands. According to Cruise Lines International Association, 90% of commercial vessels calling on U.S. ports fly foreign flags. To avoid the high cost with more rules and regulations, ships and tankers sometime prefer lower cost registration with a lower standard of inspection and regulation by picking a country that exercises less control over their registered ships, though many ships are owned by individuals or companies in another country (most commonly Japan and Greece) under a system called "flag of convenience". Registering a ship in Panama means that the ship is governed by the maritime rules of Panama rather than the ship owner's country. Ship owners do this because Panama has low taxes and fewer labor and safety regulations than most other countries. Ship owners can make their staff work longer hours in less safe environments, and therefore maximize their profits. Other countries, including Liberia, Cyprus and the Bahamas also offer flags of convenience, but Panama has the most ships registered under the scheme. Ships registered with the US will cost more, and the employee wages will be even higher. Freedom of the seas allows a ship to move freely on the ocean as long as it follows international law.

== Trade opportunities ==
From the Vikings to the European, Central Asia, Africa and North and South America, trade has served an important role in history, and has been a key factor of a growing economy. Trade transfers the ownership of goods from one person or entity to another by getting a product or service in exchange from the buyer. When a ship sets sail, there may be many ports waiting for it to bring goods from all over the world for trade and sale. Free trade opening up markets to foreign suppliers increases competition. Without free trade, domestic companies may have enjoyed monopolies or oligopolies that enabled them to keep prices well above marginal costs. Trade liberalization will undermine that market power.

The Merchant Marine Act of 1920, also known as the Jones Act (46 USC § 883) is a maritime law that controls coastal trade within the United States and determines which ships may lawfully engage in that trade and the rules under which they must operate. The act is in place to protect jobs for US citizens and its people working at U.S. ports, and on U.S. vessels. Many vessels around the globe sail under many different flags, and have different crews from different parts of the world where the pay rate is much lower than the U.S. The Jones Act protects the Americans' jobs and restricts coastwise transportation of passengers. 46 USC § 12108 additionally restricts the use of foreign vessels to commercially catch or transport fish in U.S. waters.

== See also ==
- Dominium maris baltici
- Mare liberum
- Passenger Vessel Services Act of 1886, a similar law concerning passenger transportation between US ports.
- Seaman status in United States admiralty law
- Treaty of Alcáçovas
- Treaty of Tordesillas

== Sources ==
- Freedom_of_the_seas by Hugo Grotius ((in English))
- Julian Corbett (1918), The League of Nations and freedom of the seas (1st ed.), London: Oxford University Press, Wikidata Q105638286
