= Krakatoa: The Day the World Exploded =

2003 book by Simon Winchester

- First UK edition
- Author: Simon Winchester
- Language: English
- Publisher: Viking Press
- Publication date: 2003
- Pages: 432
- ISBN: 0-141-00517-3

Krakatoa: The Day the World Exploded is a 2003 book by Simon Winchester covering the 1883 eruption of Krakatoa.

== Summary ==
Winchester examines the annihilation in 1883 of the volcano-island of Krakatoa, which was followed by an immense tsunami that killed nearly forty thousand people. Effects of the immense waves were felt as far away as France, and the sound of the island's destruction—per Winchester—could be heard as far away as Australia and India.

== Critical reception ==
In The New York Times, critic Janet Maslin called Krakatoa "a trove of wonderfully arcane information." Maslin added, "The author has been able to attach so many tentacles to a single event – the spectacular and catastrophic explosion of the title volcano – that there seems to be nowhere he can't go." The book was a New York Times bestseller after its initial release.
