= Giles Milton =

British writer and historian

Giles Milton FRHistS
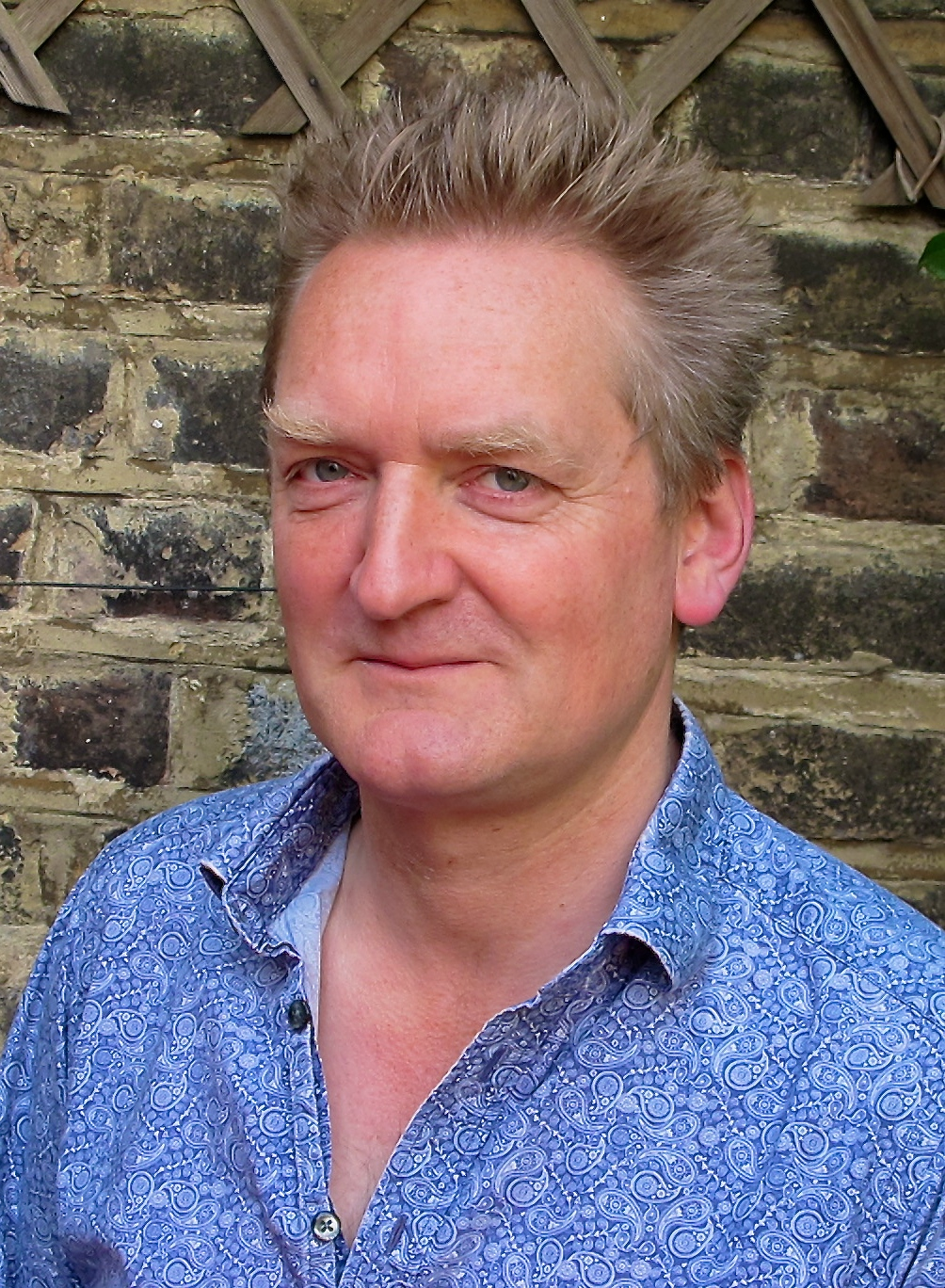
- Born: 15 January 1966 (age 60); Buckinghamshire, England
- Occupations: Writer, historian
- Spouse: Alexandra Milton
- Children: Three daughters
- Writing career
- Subjects: Cold War, World War Two, Slavery, East India Company, Elizabethan and Jacobean exploration

Giles Milton FRHistS (born 15 January 1966) is a British writer and journalist, who specialises in narrative history. He writes non-fiction, historical fiction, and children's history books, and is best known for Churchill's Ministry of Ungentlemanly Warfare, and Nathaniel's Nutmeg.

Milton's books have sold more than one million copies in the UK, and been published in twenty-five languages. He also writes and narrates the podcast series Ministry of Secrets, produced by Somethin' Else and Sony.

== Biography ==
Born in Buckinghamshire, Milton was educated at Latymer Upper School and the University of Bristol. He lives in London and Burgundy and is married to the artist and illustrator, Alexandra Milton. He has three daughters.

He was a Trustee of the London Library from 2015 to 2023.

== Works ==
Milton's Checkmate in Berlin explores post-war Berlin from 1945 to 1949, focusing on the city's division between the United States, Britain, France, and the Soviet Union. In 2023, the book featured at the Caterham History Festival at Caterham School with a talk delivered by Milton on its topic.

D-Day: The Soldiers' Story focuses on the experiences of survivors during Operation Overlord, giving voice to unheard accounts. Churchill's Ministry of Ungentlemanly Warfare contains the story of a secret irregular warfare organization and its missions during World War II.

Fascinating Footnotes From History is a collection of lesser-known stories from world history, featuring topics like Adolf Hitler's cocaine use, Josef Stalin's criminal experience, and other anecdotes about famous historical figures. The stories have been drawn from Milton's research and previously published as separate e-books. The book is available in the United States as two volumes, When Hitler Took Cocaine and Lenin Lost His Brain: History's Unknown Chapters and When Churchill Slaughtered Sheep and Stalin Robbed A Bank.

Russian Roulette is a historical account of British spies who were sent to Soviet Russia after the 1917 Bolshevik revolution, aiming to thwart Lenin's plans. The book is based on previously unknown secret documents found in archives.

Wolfram: The Boy Who Went to War tells the story of Wolfram Aichele, a young artist who grew up during the Third Reich. The book follows his life, including his time in the Reich Labour Service, his experiences in the war, and his time as a prisoner of war.

Paradise Lost: Smyrna 1922 is a historical narrative that recounts the sacking of Smyrna (modern-day Izmir) and the subsequent population exchange between Turkey and Greece in 1922. The book makes use of unpublished diaries and letters written by Smyrna's Levantine elite to provide an impartial perspective on this event. It has been praised for its balanced approach to history and has been published in both Turkish and Greek. The narrative provides a day-by-day account of the events that took place when the Turkish army entered Smyrna, looking closely at the individuals involved and the humanitarian efforts made by American charity workers.

Milton's books focus on lesser-known stories from history, chronicling the lives of extraordinary people and their exploits. His works include White Gold, which explores North African slave markets, the enslavement of white people in the 17th and 18th centuries, and the story of a young English cabin boy named Thomas Pellow; Samurai William, the historical portrayal of the life and adventures of Englishman William Adams who was shipwrecked in Japan in 1600; Big Chief Elizabeth, about English and Dutch colonial adventurers competing for control of the world supply of nutmeg in the 17th century; The Riddle and the Knight, a historical investigation into the voyages of medieval knight Sir John Mandeville through Persia, Arabia, Ethiopia, India, Sumatra, and China; and Nathaniel's Nutmeg, an account of Nathaniel Courthope's role in the 17th-century battle between the English and Dutch over nutmeg, which was highly sought after for its purported medicinal properties.

== Bibliography ==
=== Non-fiction ===
- The Riddle and the Knight: In Search of Sir John Mandeville, 1996 ISBN 978-0340819456
- Nathaniel's Nutmeg: How One Man's Courage Changed the Course of History, 1999 ISBN 978-0340696767
- Big Chief Elizabeth: The Adventures and Fate of the First English Colonists in America, 2000 ISBN 978-0340748824
- Samurai William: The Englishman Who Opened Japan, 2002 ISBN 978-0340794685
- White Gold: The Extraordinary Story of Thomas Pellow and North Africa's One Million European Slaves, 2005, Sceptre, ISBN 978-0-340-79469-2
- Paradise Lost: Smyrna 1922, 2008, Sceptre, ISBN 978-0-340-83786-3
- Wolfram: The Boy Who Went To War, 2011, Sceptre, ISBN 978-0-340-83788-7
- Russian Roulette: A Deadly Game: How British Spies Thwarted Lenin's Global Plot, 2013, Sceptre, ISBN 978-1-444-73702-8
- Fascinating Footnotes from History, 2015, John Murray. ISBN 978-1473624993
- When Hitler Took Cocaine and Lenin Lost His Brain, 2016, Picador, ISBN 978-1-250-07877-3
- When Churchill Slaughtered Sheep and Stalin Robbed a Bank, 2016, Picador, ISBN 978-1-250-07875-9
- Churchill's Ministry of Ungentlemanly Warfare, 2016, John Murray. ISBN 978-1-444-79895-1
- D-Day: The Soldiers' Story, 2019, John Murray. ISBN 978-1473649040
- Soldier, Sailor, Frogman, Spy, Airman, Gangster, Kill or Die: How the Allies Won on D-Day, 2019, Henry Holt & Company, ISBN 978-1-250-13492-9 (paperback published as Soldier, Sailor, Frogman, Spy, 2021, ISBN 9781250134936
- Checkmate Berlin: The Cold War Showdown That Shaped the Modern World, 2021, Henry Holt & Company, ISBN 9781250247568
- The Stalin Affair: The Impossible Alliance That Won the War, 2024, Henry Holt & Company, ISBN 9781250247582

=== Novels ===
- Edward Trencom's Nose: A Novel of History, Dark Intrigue, and Cheese, 2007
- According to Arnold: A Novel of Love and Mushrooms, 2009
- The Perfect Corpse, 2014, ISBN 978-0992897222

=== Children's books ===
- Call Me Gorgeous, 2009, Alexandra Milton, illustrator.
- Zebedee's Zoo, 2009, Kathleen McEwen, illustrator.
- Good Luck Baby Owls, 2012, Alexandra Milton, illustrator.
- Children of the Wild, 2013.
