= Moucheron =

Moucheron is the French word for gnat. It can also refer to:

- Balthazar de Moucheron: a merchant from Antwerp on Russia, Levant, Africa, Ceylon, and the Caribbean, who founded a trading company before the establishment of the Dutch East India Company.
- Frederik de Moucheron (Emden 1633 - Amsterdam 1686) : a Dutch Italian landscapes painter in the list of people from the Dutch Golden Age or in the list of Dutch painters.
- Isaac de Moucheron
- Hendrik de Moucheron : a family name in the list of Swedish noble families.
- Moucheron : a horse winning the Irish 1,000 Guineas in 1928.
- "Lucia the Moucheron", an opera by Flairck first released in 2002.
- Moucheron : a boat part of the List of Royal Navy ships.
- [Mam'zelle] Moucheron : an operette by Jacques Offenbach.
- LE LION ET LE MOUCHERON. 1932 - The Lion and the Fly : a film by Ladislas Starevich.
- HMS Moucheron, a French privateer that HMS Révolutionnaire captured in 1801 and that disappeared without a trace in the Mediterranean in 1807.
