= Willem Schellinks =

Dutch painter

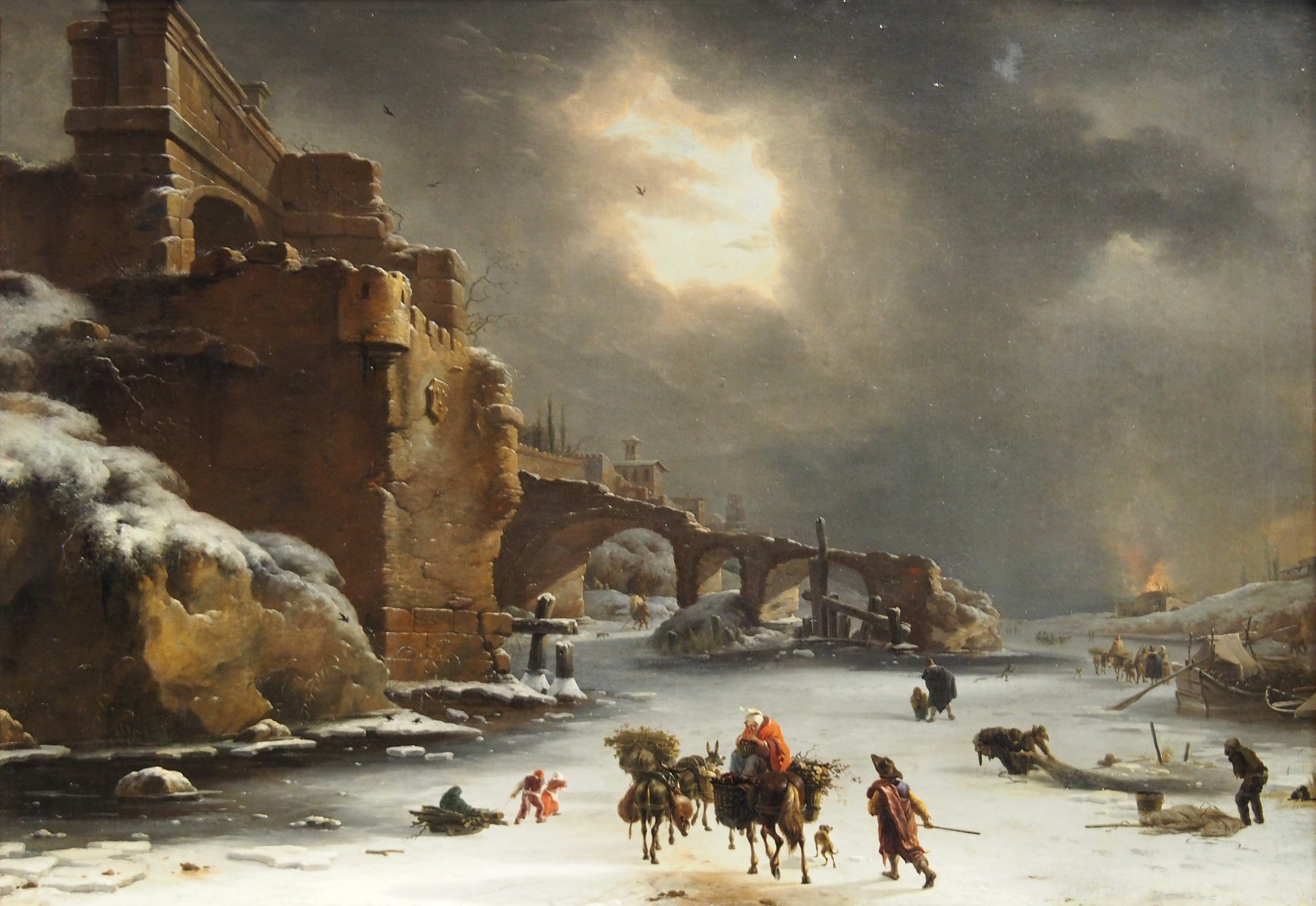
- City Walls in Winter
- Born: 2 February 1623, Amsterdam
- Died: 12 October 1678 (aged 55), Amsterdam
- Known for: painting, drawing, poetry

Willem Schellinks (1623–1678) was a Dutch painter, draughtsman and etcher of landscapes and marine scenes and also a poet. Willem Schellinks was one of the most widely traveled Dutch artists of his time. He traveled along the Loire and the Seine in 1646, and between 1661 and 1665 he visited England, France, Italy, Malta, Germany and Switzerland, keeping a record of his travels in multiple landscapes and scenic views as well as a journal. Alternative spellings, Schellinger and Schellinx.

== Life ==
Willem Schellinks was born into a family of artists in Amsterdam. He was the son of a surveyor and the brother of Daniël Schellinks (1627–1701), who was active as an amateur artist. Another brother, Jacob, settled in Southampton, Connecticut Colony and took up whaling. After finishing his studies with Karel Dujardin at the age of about twenty, he traveled to France with Lambert Doomer in 1646. After that he undertook another journey in 1661–1665 as the guide of a certain Mr 'Jakob Thierry de Jong', a young gentleman on his Grand Tour.

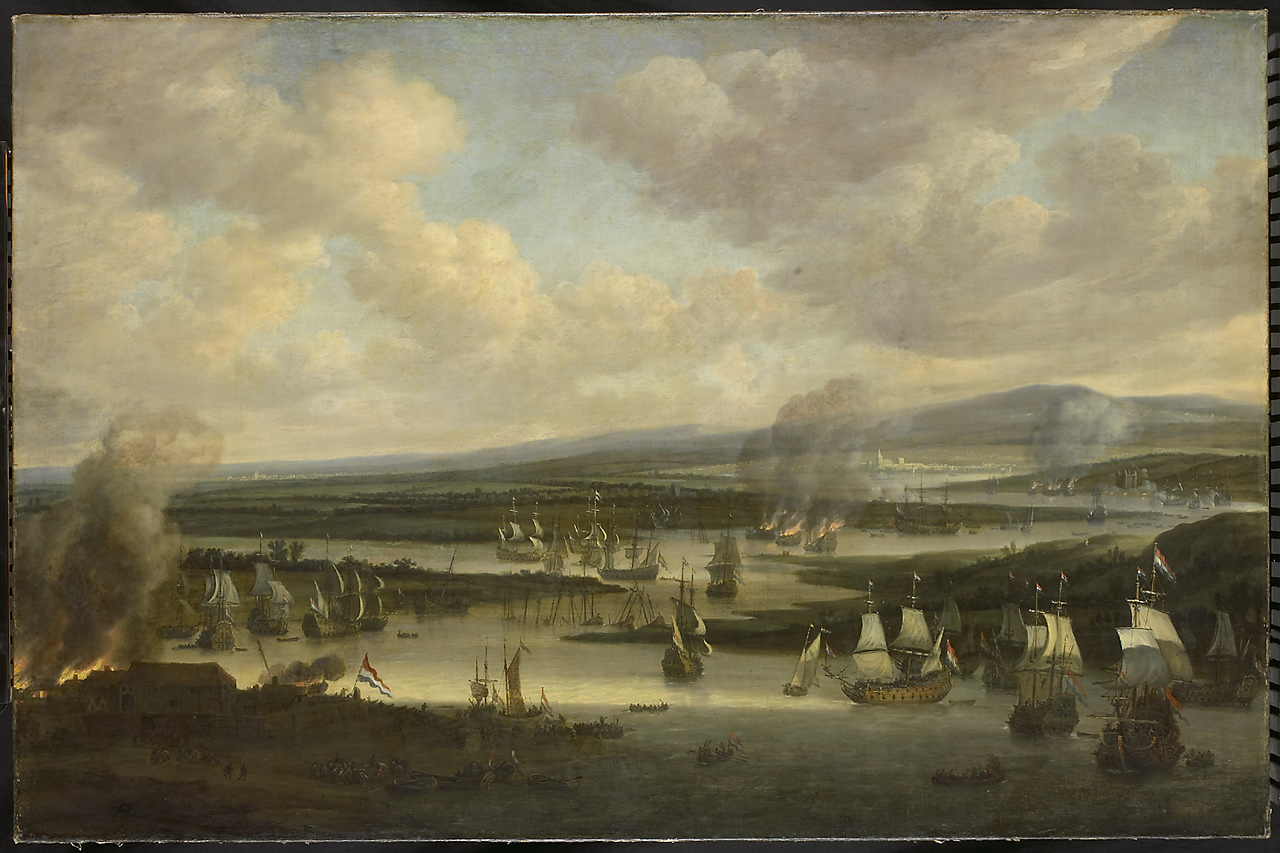
Burning of the English fleet at Chatham

Schellinks compiled his drawings and notes about this last journey in three volumes, that remained unpublished, but which he kept for friends to read. The painter-engraver Arnoud van Halen acquired these volumes and the Dutch artist biographer Arnold Houbraken was granted permission to read through them himself. This trip, which he began on 14 July 1661, included visits to England, France, Italy, Sicily, Malta, Germany and Switzerland. He describes the main sights of the cities he visits. His route home from Italy took him "from Venice to Padua, over Verona, Mantua, Trento, and Munich. In Munich he visited all of the rooms of the newly built Palace of the Bavarian Counts, and he described all of the paintings and statues he saw there. He then continued on to Augsburg, Regensburg, Nuremberg, Hanau, Frankfurt, Worms, Frankenthal, Heidelberg, Speyer, Strasbourg, Breisach, Basel, Zürich, Baden, Bern, Mainz, Cologne, Mülheim, Düsseldorf, Cleves, Nijmegen and Utrecht, where he arrived 23 August 1665."

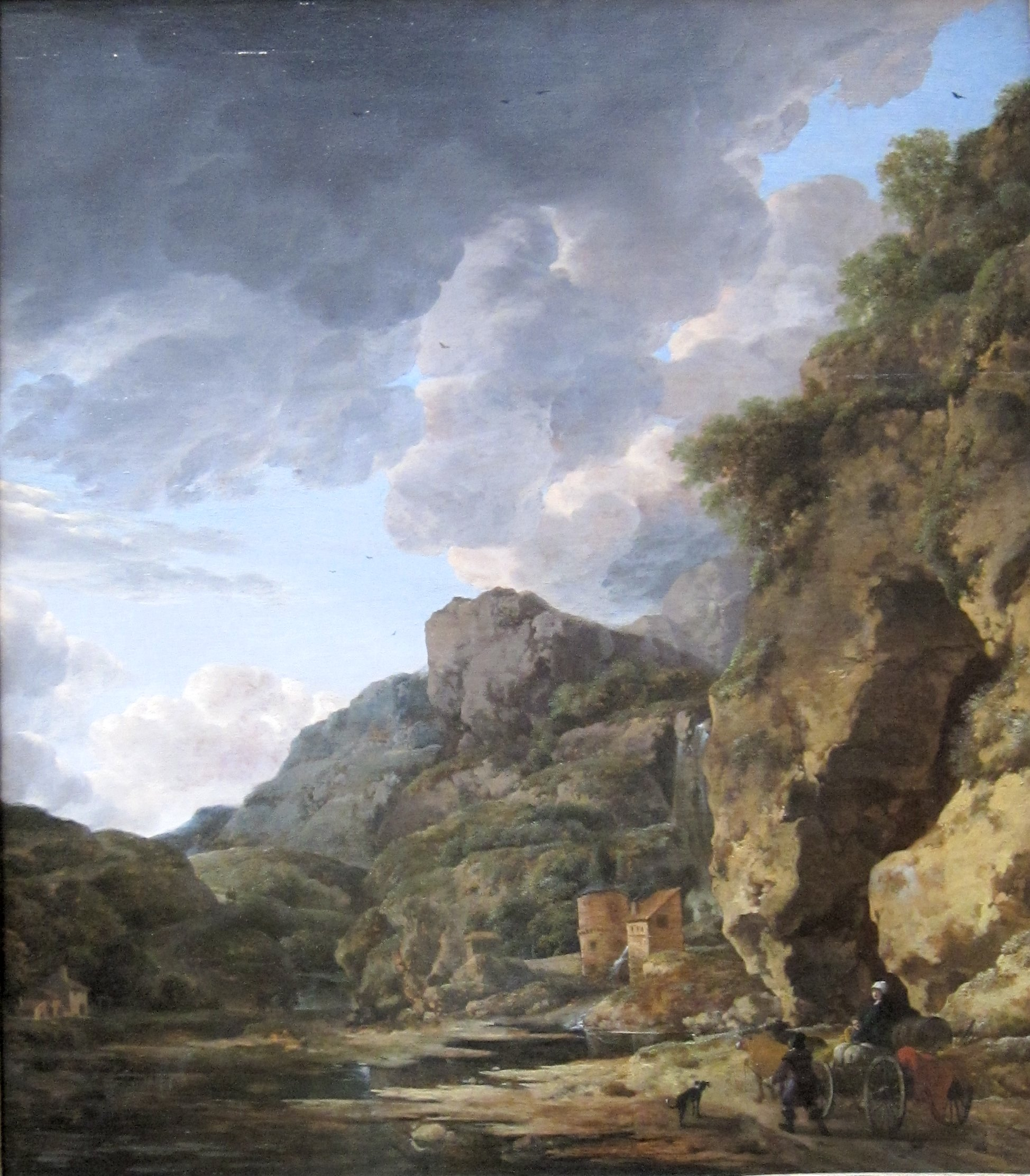
Mountain Landscape with River and Wagon

Schellinks' hand-written journal, written some years after his travels 1661–1665 and based on his now lost notes, is preserved in the Royal Library of Copenhagen. A transcription made by Schellinks himself is now in the Bodleian Library. The part of the journal covering his trip in England was published in English. The journal forms an important record of the conditions of travel in the 17th century. While Schellinks does not offer many insights into his views on art or approach to landscape painting, his description of the art collections in the Roman palaces would have filled a gap in the Dutch travel literature of his time. Schellinks may have been commissioned by the Dutch government to make the sketches on his foreign travels, since many of his drawings include strategic points that would have interested the government's intelligence service. Some of them were also used in the compilation of the famous Atlas Blaeu-Van der Hem, published in Amsterdam between 1649 and 1673.

== Work ==
Willem Schellinks mainly drew and painted Dutch and Italian views, river and harbor scenes, inns or ancient ruins with resting horsemen and hunting parties. He also painted a number of winter scenes. He borrowed liberally from the style of other artists, particularly of the Italianate masters. It is likely that his works are so rare because many of them have been wrongly attributed to other painters. After Schellinks's death, Frederick de Moucheron completed many of his paintings and added figures to them.

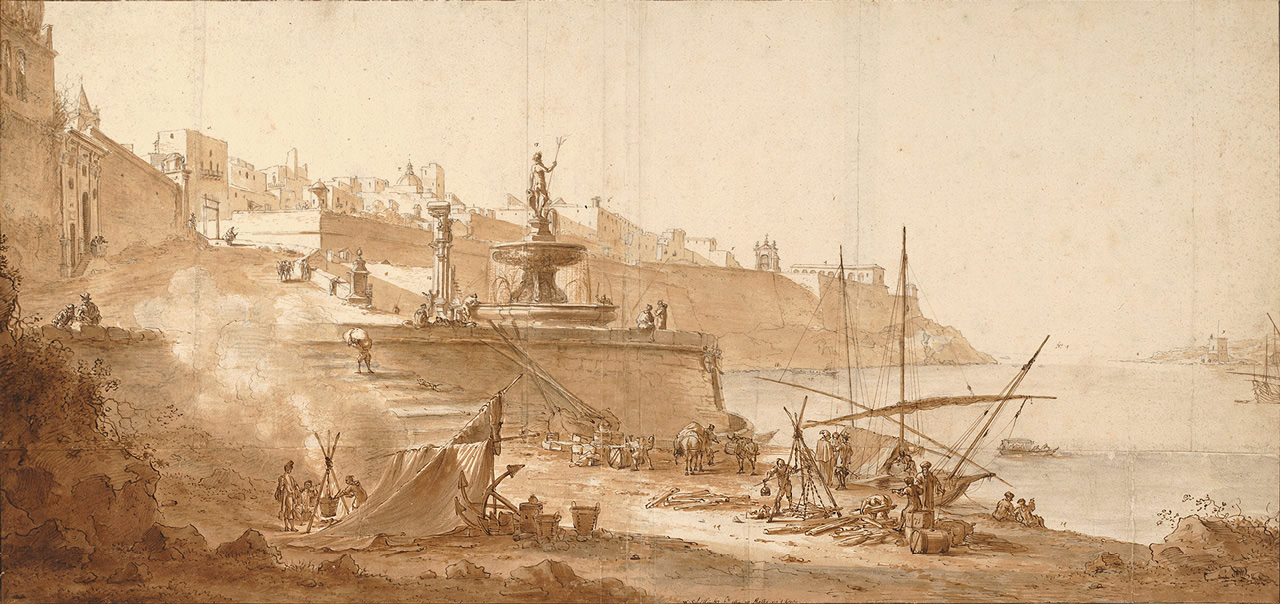
La Fontana Nuova, Valletta, Grand Harbour

An important influence on his work was Jan Asselyn. Asselyn was chiefly known as a painter of southern landscapes with ruins, but had in addition developed a new type of winter landscape. Instead of the traditional type of winter landscape, characterized by an addition of planes and crowds of figures, Asselyn painted landscapes in which the compositional elements were limited to a few large motifs and some sparse figures, used only to enliven the scene. His main aim was to give a subtle rendering of the winter atmosphere. These winter landscapes formed an important inspiration for Schellinks' own compositions. The composition City Walls in Winter (Rijksmuseum) was in fact originally attributed to Asselyn. This winter landscape was inspired by Asselyn's composition in an English private collection. Schellinks reinterpretation exaggerated the pathetic connotations.

Schellinks used his earlier drawings of England as the basis for his paintings of the successful 1667 naval raid by the Dutch on the English fleet at Chatham during the Second Anglo-Dutch War. He depicts the moment when the Dutch triumph by showing an English military contingent arriving too late.

Schellinks often collaborated with other artists for whom he painted either the landscapes or the figures. For instance, in the Mountain Landscape with River and Wagon (Getty Museum) he painted the figures in the landscape by the hand of Herman Nauwincx. In The country estate of burgomaster Nicolaas Pancras (Amsterdam Museum), he painted the landscape to which Adriaen van de Velde added the figures and animals.
