= Isaac de Moucheron =

Dutch painter

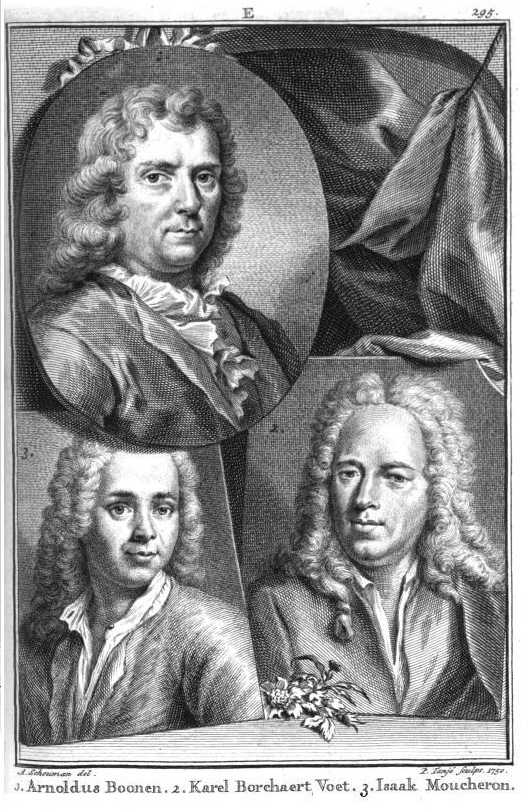
Portrait of Isaak Moucheron (lower left) in Jan van Gool's "Nieuw Schouburg", 1750

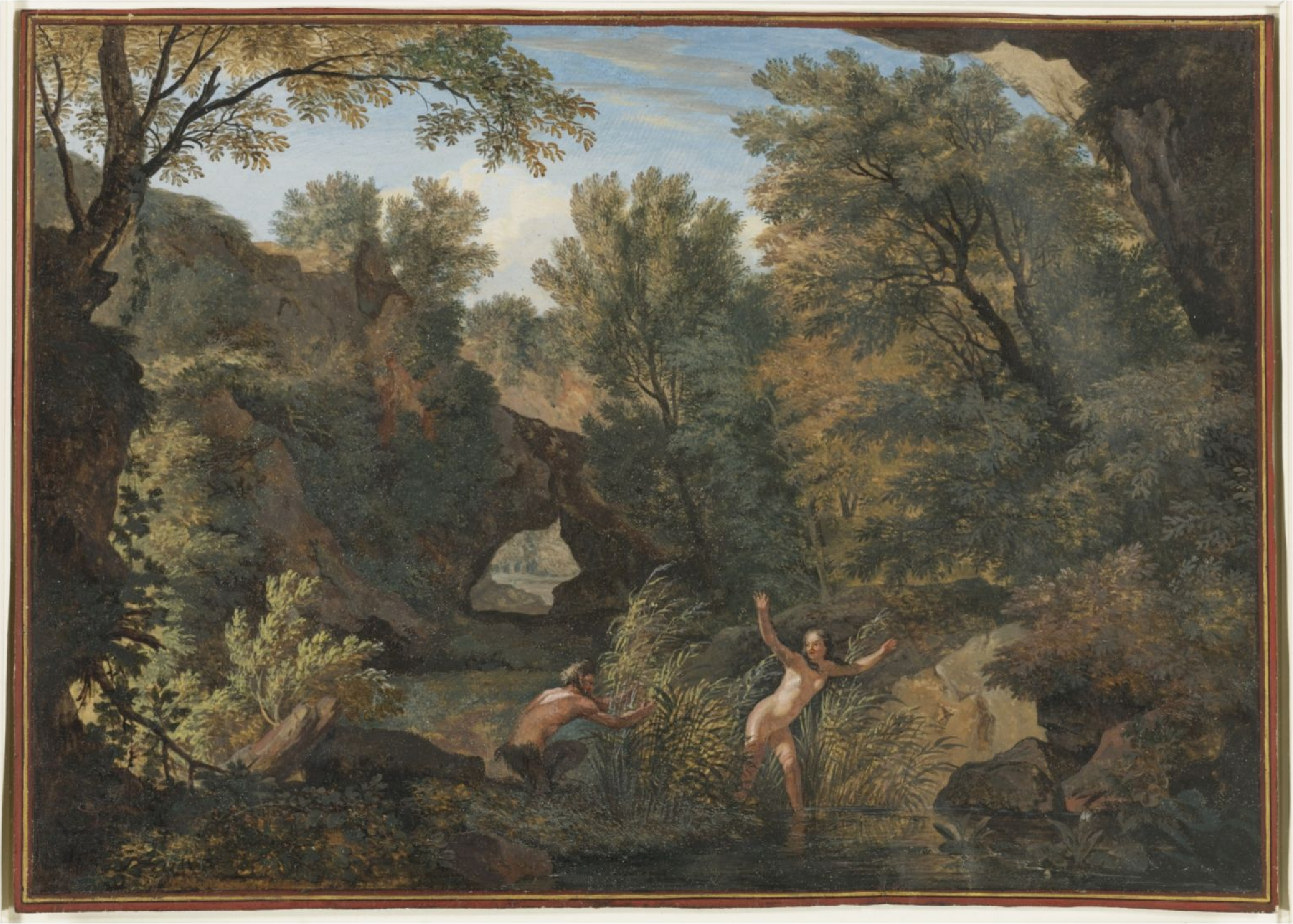
Rugged river landscape with a nymph surprised by a satyr

Isaac de Moucheron (1667–1744) was an 18th-century painter and interior decorator (wall painter) from the Dutch Republic.

== Biography ==
He was born in Amsterdam, Dutch Republic. According to the RKD he was one of ten children of the landscape painter Frederik de Moucheron and Maria Magdalena de Jouderville, the daughter of the Rembrandt pupil Isaac de Jouderville, for whom he was named. His father taught him to paint and then he travelled to Italy for two years. When he returned he became known for Italianate landscapes on wall hangings for wealthy Amsterdam families. In 1713 he married Anna van der Bucken. He lived on Vijzelgracht across Walenweeshuis. He collaborated on larger projects with Jacob de Wit, and many of their collaborations still remain in the patrician homes where they were painted. He died in 1744 in Amsterdam.

According to Houbraken, when Moucheron returned from Italy he had with him a copy he had made after Nicolas Poussin, which the postmaster of Zwolle bought without asking him who had painted it. When Isaac later declared that it was a copy by his own hand, he claimed the postmaster had never explicitly asked who had painted it, but had wished to see his things that he had brought back with him. This anecdote was told in order to show the popularity of Poussin in the art market of the Netherlands in Gerard Uilenburg's time. Houbraken mentioned him again as a Rome traveller with the bentname Ordenantie in his biographical sketch of Pieter de Molyn, who he knew in Rome. Moucheron told Houbraken that he judged De Molijn at that time to be a man of about 50 in 1697. Houbraken intended to write a biographical sketch of Isaac in his birth year of 1667, and mentioned this in his biographical sketch of his father Frederik de Moucheron, but was unable to complete it (he died before publication of Volume III, which ended with birth year 1659).

== Collections ==
Moucheron's work is held in the permanent collections of several institutions, including the Kemper Art Museum, the British Museum, the Museum Boijmans Van Beuningen, the Metropolitan Museum of Art, the Nelson-Atkins Museum of Art, the Philadelphia Museum of Art, the Cooper Hewitt, the Ackland Art Museum, the University of Michigan Museum of Art, the Harvard Art Museums, the Johnson Museum of Art, the Staedel Museum, and the Museum of the Shenandoah Valley.
