= Jan van der Heyden =

Dutch painter (1637–1712)

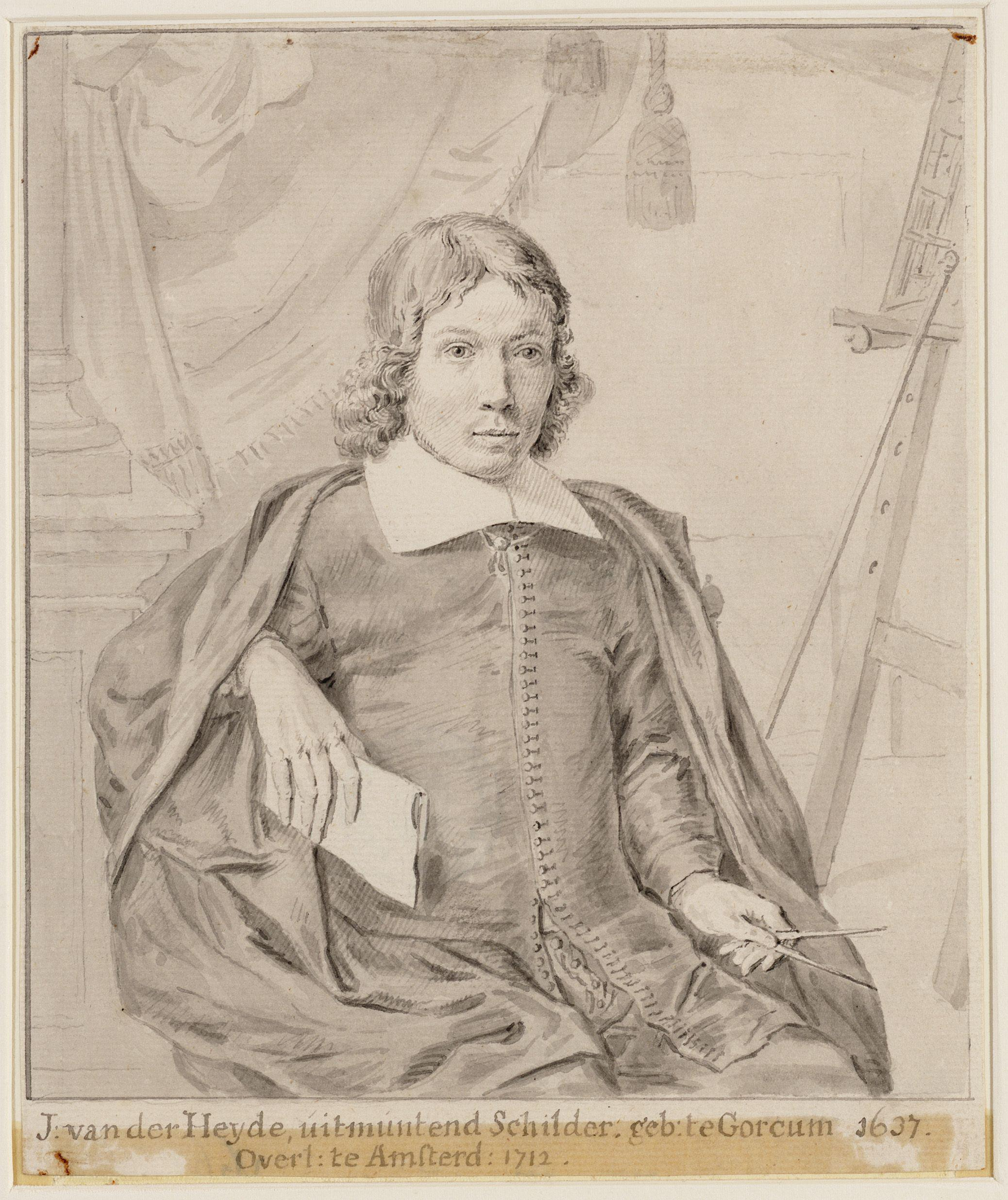
- Portrait of Jan van der Heyden
- Born: March 5, 1637; Gorinchem
- Died: March 28, 1712 (aged 75); Amsterdam
- Occupations: Artist, engineer, city official
- Spouse: Sarah Terhiel
- Children: Jan, Samuel, Sarah
- Parent(s): Jan Goriszoon, Neeltje Jans Munster

Jan van der Heyden (5 March 1637, Gorinchem – 28 March 1712, Amsterdam) was a Dutch Baroque-era painter, glass painter, draughtsman and printmaker. Van der Heyden was one of the first Dutch painters to specialize in townscapes and became one of the leading architectural painters of the Dutch Golden Age. He painted a number of still lifes in the beginning and at the end of his career.

Jan van der Heyden was also an engineer and inventor who made significant contributions to contemporary firefighting technology. Together with his brother Nicolaes, who was a hydraulic engineer, he invented an improvement of the fire hose in 1672. He modified the manual fire engine, reorganised the volunteer fire brigade (1685) and wrote and illustrated the first firefighting manual (Brandspuiten-boek). A comprehensive street lighting scheme for Amsterdam, designed and implemented by van der Heyden, remained in operation from 1669 until 1840 and was adopted as a model by many other towns and abroad.

== Life ==
Jan van der Heyden was born in Gorinchem, the son of a mennonite father and the third of eight children. His father was by turns an oil mill owner, a grain merchant and a broker. The family moved to Amsterdam in 1646 and van der Heyden’s father acquired local citizenship. Jan van der Heyden himself would never acquire Amsterdam citizenship.

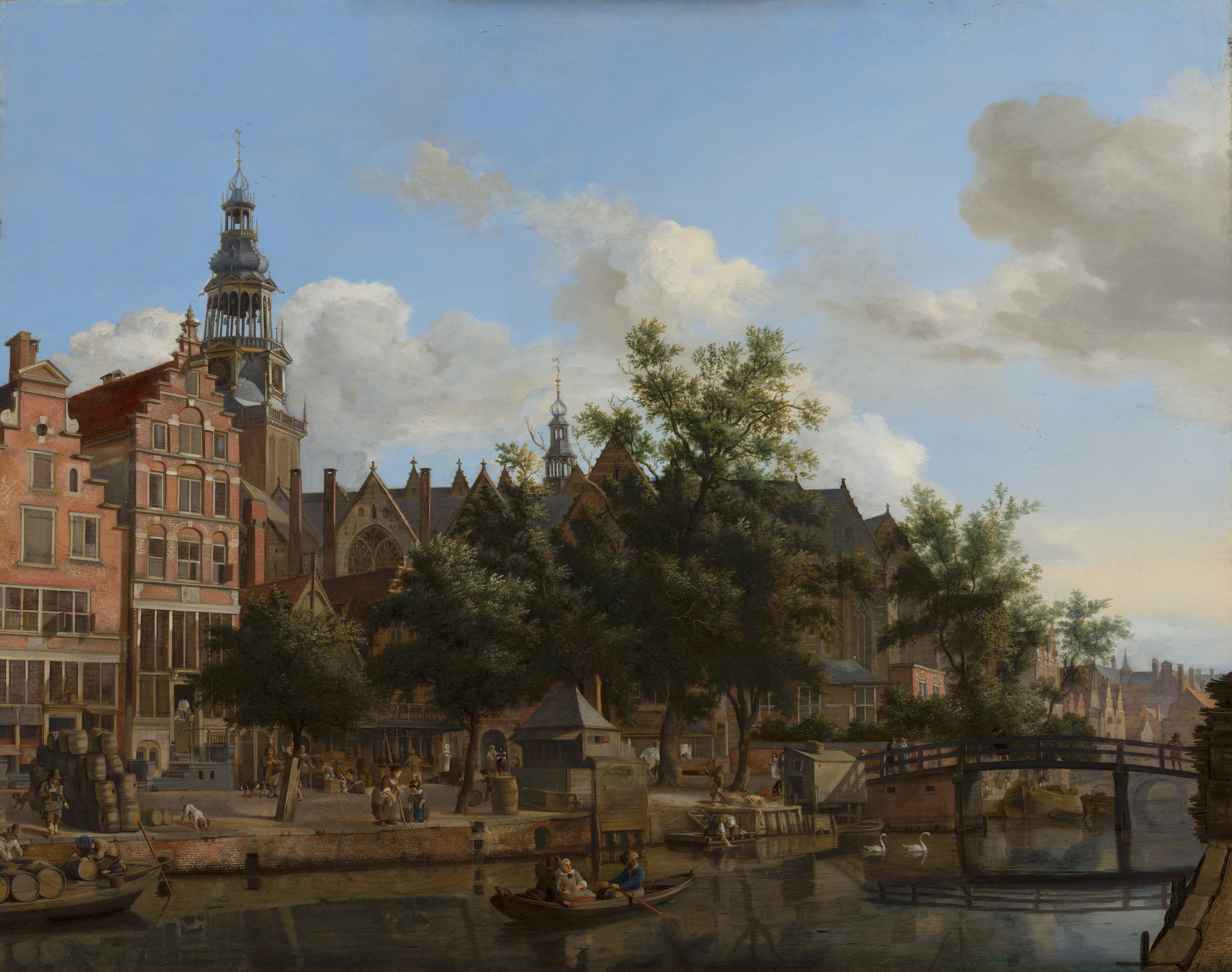
View of Oudezijds Voorburgwal with the Oude Kerk in Amsterdam

Jan van der Heyden may have received his initial artistic training in the studio of a relative, perhaps his eldest brother, Goris van der Heyden, who made and sold mirrors. He had joined his brother Goris in his mirror producing and selling business. He may also have learned drawing from a glass painter. It is possible that his teacher was one of the most admired glass painters of the time, Jacob van der Ulft, who was also originally from Jan van der Heyden's hometown. Several examples of van der Heyden’s paintings on glass (verre eglomisé) have survived and probably date from this early part of his career.

He married Sara ter Hiel of Utrecht on 26 June 1661 in Amsterdam. At the time of his marriage, he lived on the most fashionable canal in Amsterdam, Herengracht. He was then already a practising artist. His earliest dated works are two drawn portraits of his brother-in-law Samuel ter Hiel and his bride, Jacquemijntje van der Passe date 1659. His earliest dated painting is from 1663. As a young man he witnessed the fire in the old town hall which made a deep impression on him. He later would describe or draw 80 fires in almost any neighborhood of Amsterdam. In 1668 Cosimo III de' Medici bought one of his paintings, a view of the townhall with a manipulated perspective.

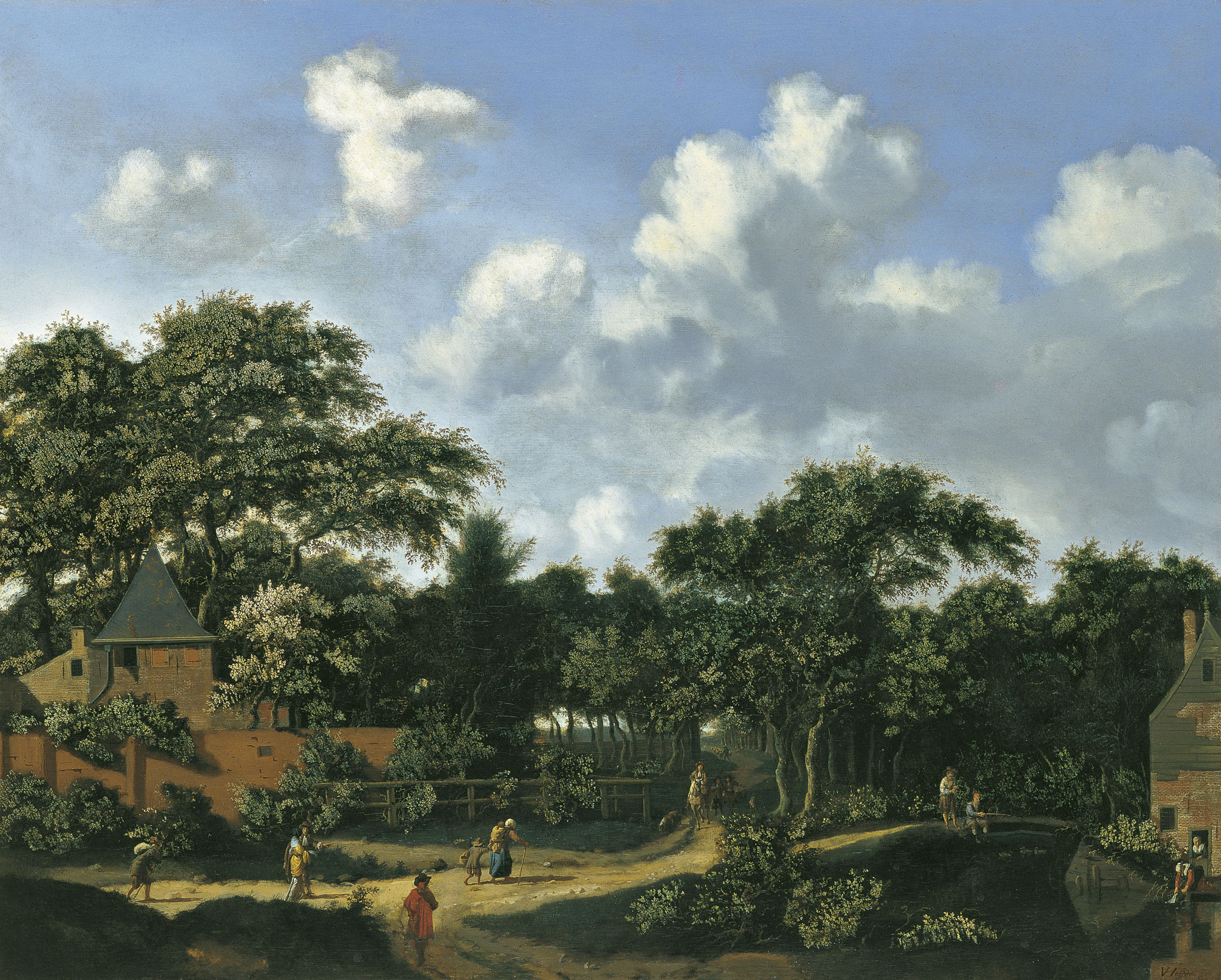
Crossroad in a Wood

Painting was not the sole occupation and interest of van der Heyden. In fact he never joined Amsterdam's painters' guild. Even while his work was in great demand, he did not rely on his art to make a living. His principal source of income was, in fact, not painting. Rather he was employed as engineer, inventor and municipal official. He was clearly greatly preoccupied with the problem of how to fight fires effectively, and, with his brother Nicolaes, devoted much time between 1668 and 1671 to inventing a new, highly successful water pumping mechanism.

He devised street lamps and the first street-lighting system for Amsterdam and was in 1669 appointed director of street lighting.

In 1673 the two brothers received official appointments to manage the city’s fire-fighting equipment and organisation. The two officials appointments were sufficient to ensure the prosperity of the artist.

Jan van der Heyden moved in 1680 to the Koestraat near the St. Anthonismarkt. Here he built a new family home and a factory for producing fire equipment. In collaboration with his eldest son Jan, he published in 1690 an illustrated book on fire-fighting, entitled 'Beschrijving der nieuwlijks uitgevonden en geoctrojeerde Slangbrandspuiten' ('Description of the recently invented and patented hose fire engines').

Jan van der Heyden died a wealthy man in 1712. His wife survived her husband by only a month. The inventory of the estate made soon after her death include more than 70 of his own paintings. His only known pupil is his son Jan.

== Work ==
=== General ===
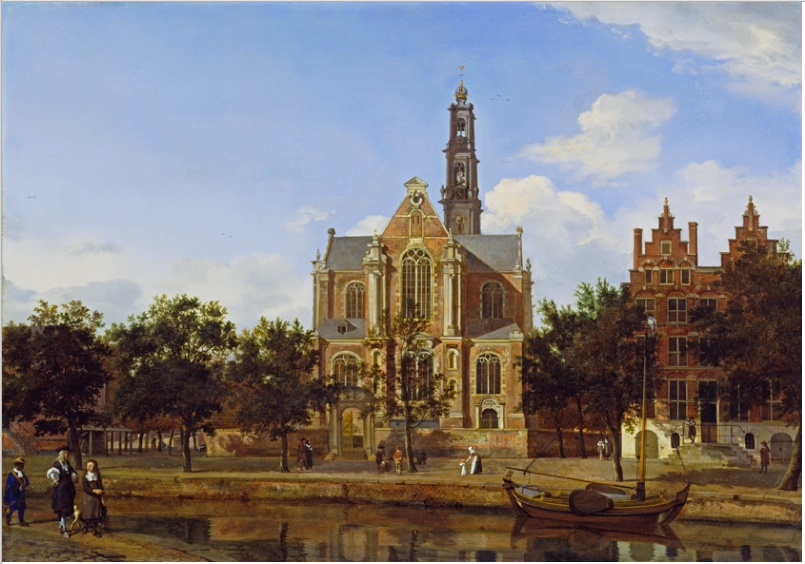
View of the Westerkerk, Amsterdam

Van der Heyden was one of the first Dutch painters to dedicate most of his output to cityscapes and other depictions of groups of buildings. Recent scholarship suggests his approach transcended pure topographical documentation, incorporating systematic autobiographical elements and sophisticated compositional planning that positioned him as an innovative artistic strategist rather than merely a documentarian. In addition, he also painted approximately 40 pure landscapes, of which two on glass. At the end of his career he painted still lifes in indoor settings.

=== Architectural paintings ===
His most frequent subject were various views of Amsterdam. In addition, he painted vistas of other Dutch, Flemish and German cities (in particular the region near the Dutch–German border), country houses and estates and landscapes. It is believed that he visited these places personally. A painting of an Italian scene is believed to have been based on a drawing by Daniël Schellinks. Other foreign scenes may have been based on drawings of other artists. Van der Heyden often painted country estates. Several views exist of a country estate owned by Joan Huydecoper II, the Amsterdam burgomaster. A set of 14 paintings depicting scenes in and around the village of Maarssen were likely also made on commission for Joan Huydecoper II, who had developed real estate around that village.

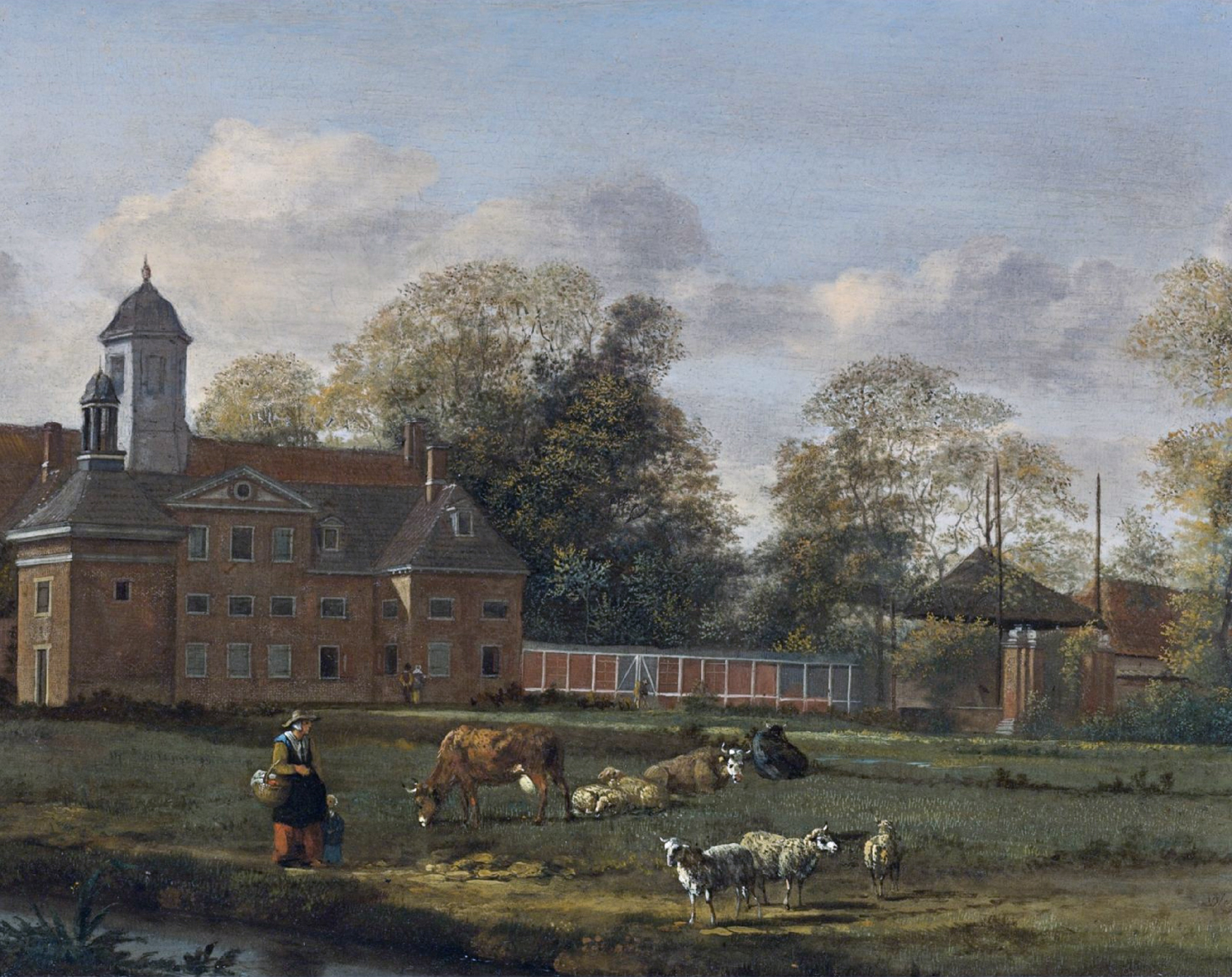
Goudestein

Van der Heyden also created completely imaginary architectural fantasies, so-called capricci. An example is An Architectural Fantasy (c. 1670, National Gallery of Art), which appears to be a product of pure imagination. Italian influences are visible in the classical structure recalling the buildings of Palladio and the decorative sculptural elements. The figures, probably painted by Adriaen van de Velde, in contrast, are unmistakably Dutch. While the great house with its sunlit formal gardens evokes an idealized world, at the elaborate gateway of the brick walls surrounding the gardens, an elegant gentleman encounters a beggar with her baby. The inclusion of these discordant elements undermining the country idyll set van der Heyden apart from his contemporary Gerrit Berckheyde. Various of his compositions include out-of-place statuary, stray farm animals or even urban shepherdesses, which add a feeling of anomaly and contradiction. These elements contribute to the feeling of modernity typical for his works. Only one painting known as the Triumph of Mordecai (Staatliches Museum Schwerin), depicts a history scene. It is probably an early work, which, as behoves an architectural painter, gives much prominence to the buildings in the composition.

Despite the apparently naturalistic style, which was so detailed that every single brick was visible, the artist did not strive for topographical accuracy in his city views. Even in his depictions of recognizable sites he regularly adapted and rearranged the architecture and setting to fit his overall compositional goals. Topographical accuracy was clearly not his primary objective. Rather he strove to present an idealized vision of the world around him. Despite the attention to detail, Jan van der Heyden's primary aim was to achieve an overall harmony in his compositions. It is possible that van der Heyden achieved the details in his paintings with the aid of a magnifying glass or even a camera obscura, lenses and mirrors.

Contemporary digital analysis using 3D reconstruction techniques has revealed sophisticated compositional strategies in Van der Heyden's work. Research conducted in 2025 demonstrated that his painting positions were carefully selected for optimal perspectival effects, and that his architectural arrangements followed complex geometric principles previously unrecognized by traditional art historical analysis.

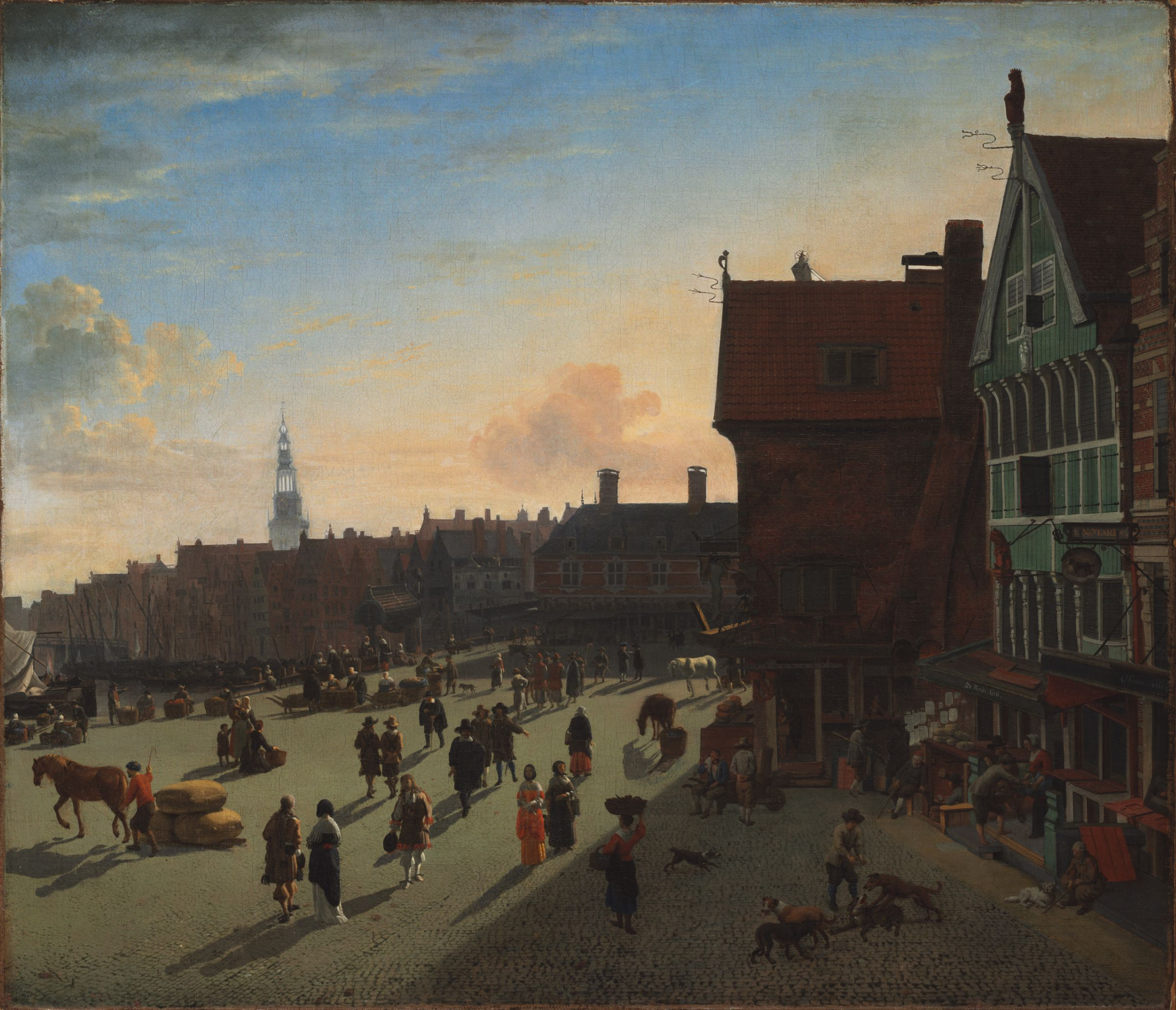
The Dam and Damrak

Van der Heyden's scenes are usually bathed in a brilliant, crisp light of almost unnatural clarity. Van der Heyden's skill in distributing areas of light and shade and his mastery of subtle atmospheric effects contribute to the sense of coherence and unity of his works.

The staffage in his paintings was often added by other artists such as Johannes Lingelbach, Adriaen van de Velde and Eglon van der Neer. He most often collaborated with the accomplished painter of figures and animals Adriaen van de Velde. The two artists had an especially successful partnership built on their complementary skills: Adriaen van de Velde contributed his lively and well-characterised figures to van der Heyden's exquisitely painted architectural settings. A fine example of their collaboration is The Dam and Damrak (c. 1663, Fogg Museum). The composition depicts the Dam and Damrak with detailed lighting effects. Based on the north-south orientation and shadow analysis, recent research (2025) has identified this as morning rather than afternoon lighting, correcting earlier misinterpretations of the temporal setting. The Damrak, the waterway that linked the Dam to Amsterdam's harbor, terminates at the far left of the composition.

=== Still lifes ===
Jan van der Heyden painted still lifes in the beginning and at the end of his career. Nine of his still lifes survive. One of his earliest dated still lifes is a Still life with a bible (signed and dated 1664, Mauritshuis). This and other early still lifes typically depict a bible and other objects on a table with a carpet.

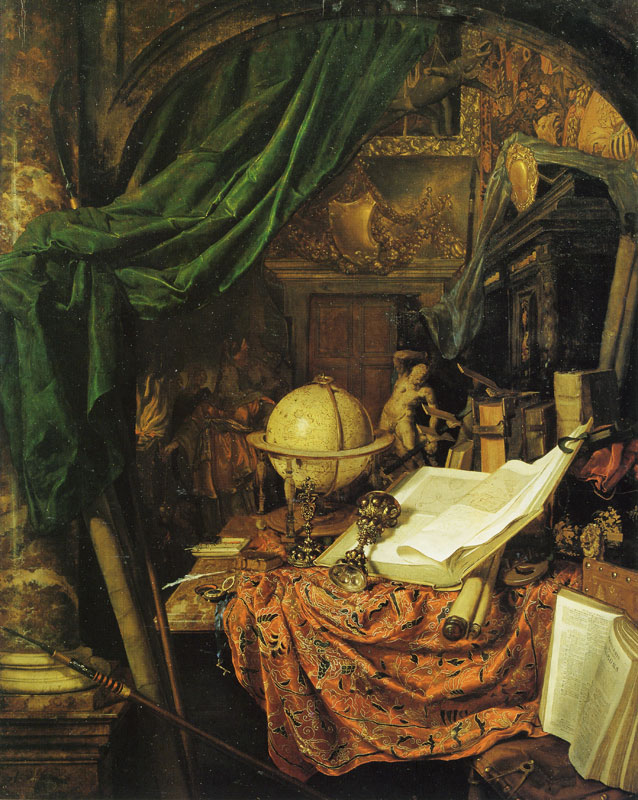
Still Life with Globe, Books, Sculpture, and Other Objects

An example of his early works in this genre is the Still Life with Globe, Books, Sculpture, and Other Objects (c. 1670, Academy of Fine Arts Vienna). This painting stands in a long tradition of Dutch still life paintings depicting vanitas symbols. These symbols include not only hourglasses, skulls and smoking candles but also attributes of scholarship and intellectual inquiry assembled in an amateur collector's cabinet or the study of a humanist scholar. This tradition is also found in the Dutch painter Gerard Dou's rare still lifes, which are considered an important influence on van der Heyden's still lifes. Dou's Allegorical Self-Portrait in a Studio, which includes still life elements, has been identified as an important influence on this composition. In particular, like in Dou's composition, van der Heyden's still life scene depicts a wide range of objects of an artistic as well as a scientific nature. These objects reference the passion of contemporary scholars for putting together collections of miscellaneous objects. The objects in van der Heyden's Still Life with Globe, Books, Sculpture, and Other Objects were apparently selected to evoke the two intellectual attributes of the active and contemplative life. The contemplative life is the life of art, philosophy and theology while the active life is characterised by curiosity about the outside world and, in particular, the commerce with the New World in which the home country of van der Heyden was actively involved. This world of trade is represented in the globe and atlas, as well as the imported products such as the Chinese silk cloth on the table, the Japanese lacquered box and the exotic animal (a South American iguana) suspended at the back of the composition. The map on which the atlas is open is a plan of the fortifications of Bergen-op-Zoom. These fortifications had been built during the Eighty Years War with Spain and had played an important role in achieving the first victories against the Spanish troops. They thus referenced the founding myths of the nation. Van der Heyden may also have selected this map as a reference to the recent hostilities with France. The same map is also included in two of his later still lifes. In the lower right of the painting is a large Protestant Bible opened to the end of Het Boeck der Psalmen (Book of Psalms) at the chapter entitled PROVERBIA / Spreuken / SALOMONIS (Solomon's Proverbs). It is likely that the artist intended to reference the messages in Solomon's Proverbs about wisdom, self-discipline and justice as well as the vanitas message, as one of the Proverbs states that only righteousness can deliver from death.

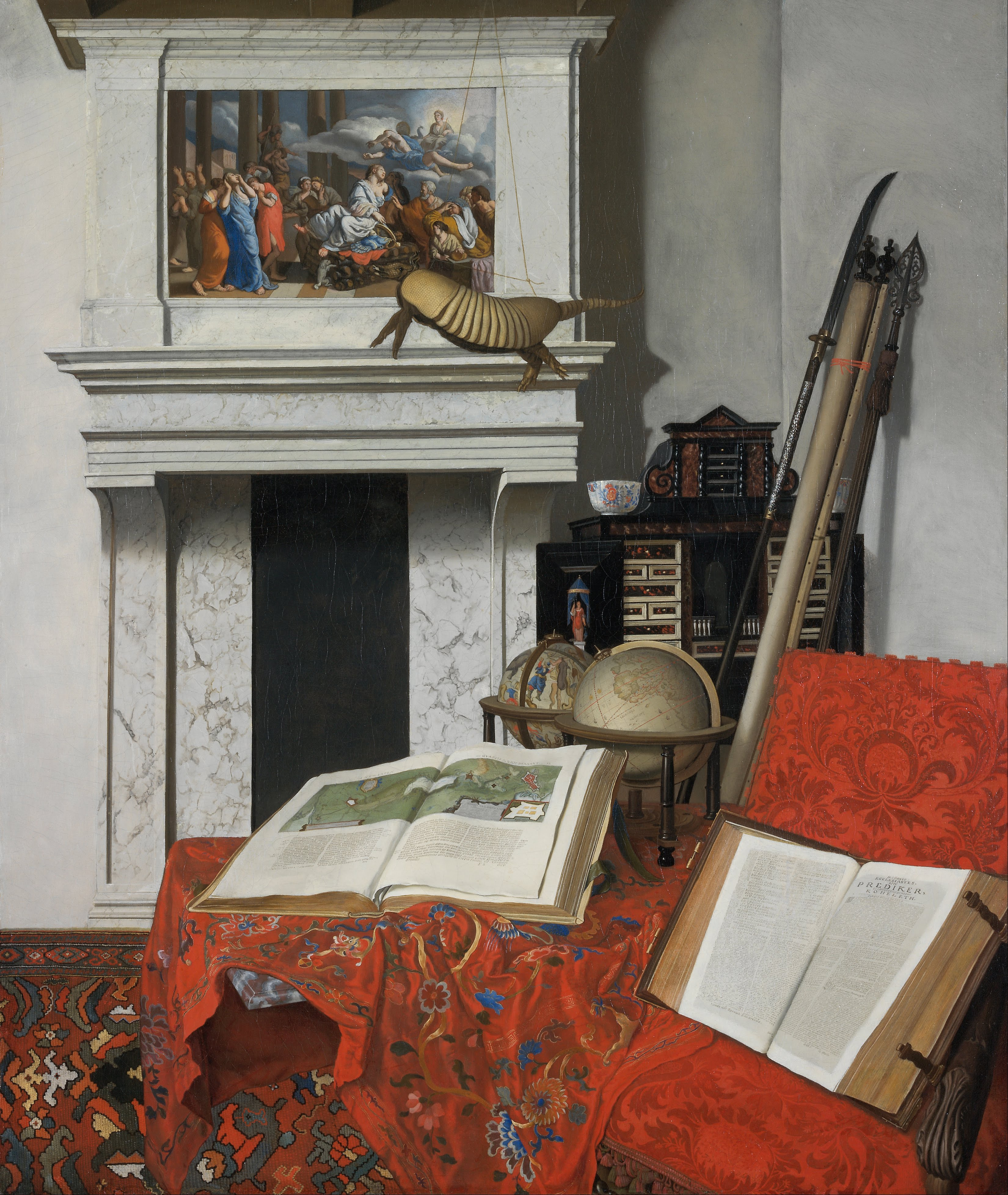
Room Corner with Curiosities

Van der Heyden stopped painting still lifes around 1670 only to return to the subject in the last two years of his life. The motifs, designs and themes in his later still lifes are the same as those of his early still lifes but their execution is very different, much drier.

Van der Heyden painted his still life masterpiece Room Corner with Curiosities at the age of seventy-five in 1712, the year he died. Now in the Museum of Fine Arts in Budapest the composition reprises the themes of his earlier still lifes with special attention given to the vanitas symbolism. The Bible in the foreground is opened at the well-known line from Ecclesiastes: 'Vanity of vanities, all is vanity'. This message may have resonated particularly with the artist who was nearing the end of his life. The objects present in the composition point to the various aspects of worldly culture, not just wealth but also noble intellectual aspirations. The atlas is again opened on the page showing the fortifications of Bergen-op-Zoom. Other exotic objects reference all the routes plowed by the Dutch merchant fleets: a Turkish carpet, Chinese silk and porcelain, Japanese weapons and a stuffed armadillo from South America. Classical culture, the cradle of European civilization, is represented in the picture above the fireplace, which depicts the tragedy of Dido, and the German cabinet, which is decorated with an image of Minerva. Terrestrial and celestial globes introduce a universal dimension into the mix of symbols.

== Museums with Jan van der Heyden's works ==
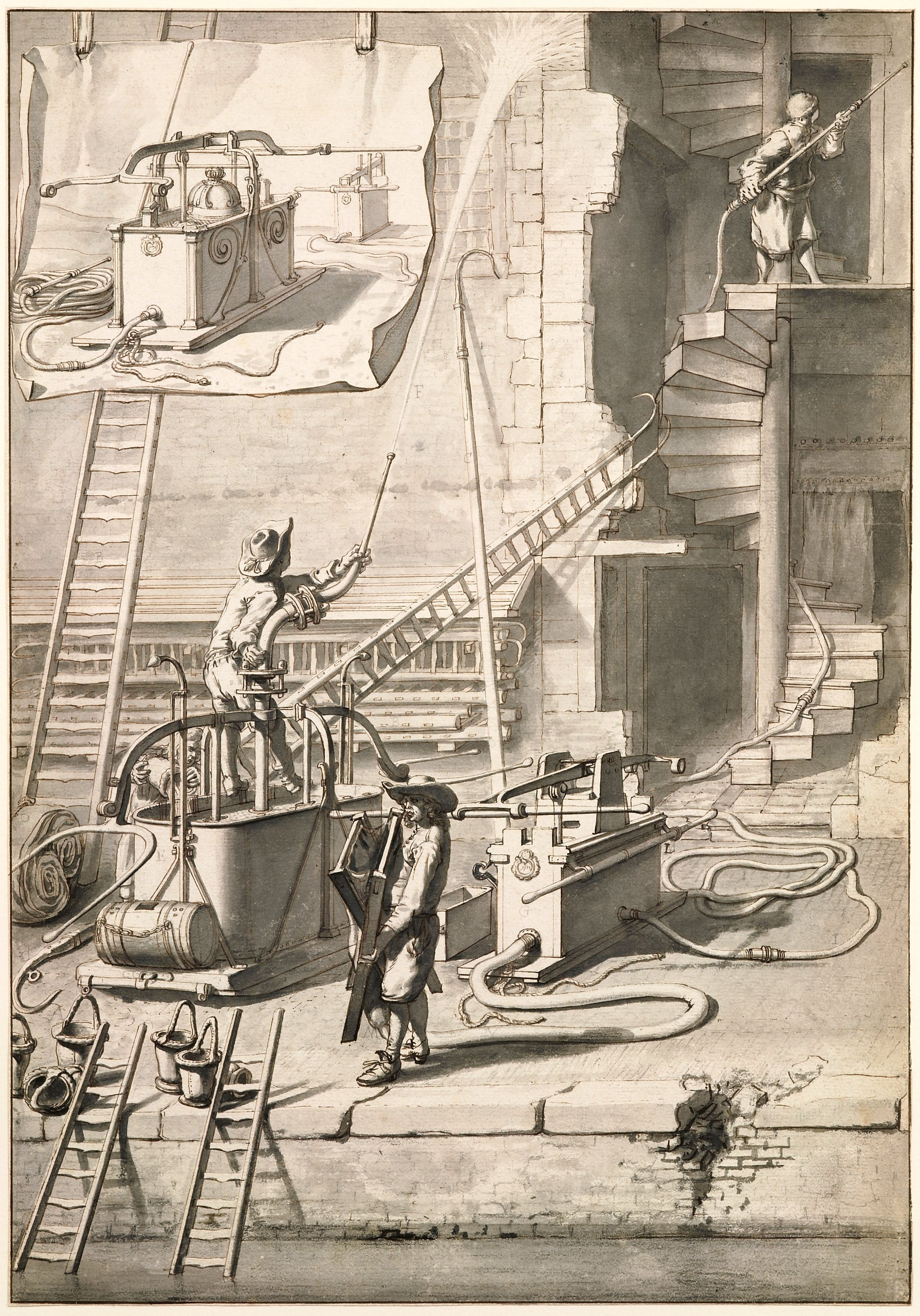
Comparison of the old fire engines with Van der Heijden's hose fire engine, drawing by Jan van der Heyden

- The National Gallery, London, England
- Amsterdams Historisch Museum, Amsterdam, Netherlands
- Rijksmuseum, Amsterdam, Netherlands
- Musée du Louvre, Paris, France
- Mauritshuis, Royal Cabinet of Paintings, The Hague
- Galleria degli Uffizi, Florence, Italy
- National Gallery of Art, Washington, D.C.
- Metropolitan Museum of Art, New York, New York
- Detroit Institute of Arts, Detroit, Michigan
- Museum of Fine Arts, Houston, Houston, Texas
- National Gallery of Armenia, Yerevan, Armenia
- Norton Simon Museum, Pasadena, California
- Yale University Art Gallery, New Haven, Connecticut

== Nazi-looted art ==
In 2019, van der Heyden's Picture of a Dutch Square which had been confiscated by the Gestapo after the Jewish owners Gottlieb and Mathilde Kraus fled Nazi persecution, was restituted to the family. The history of the painting caused a scandal when it was learned that after the war it was returned not to the Kraus family but to Nazis.
