= Pierre de Moucheron =

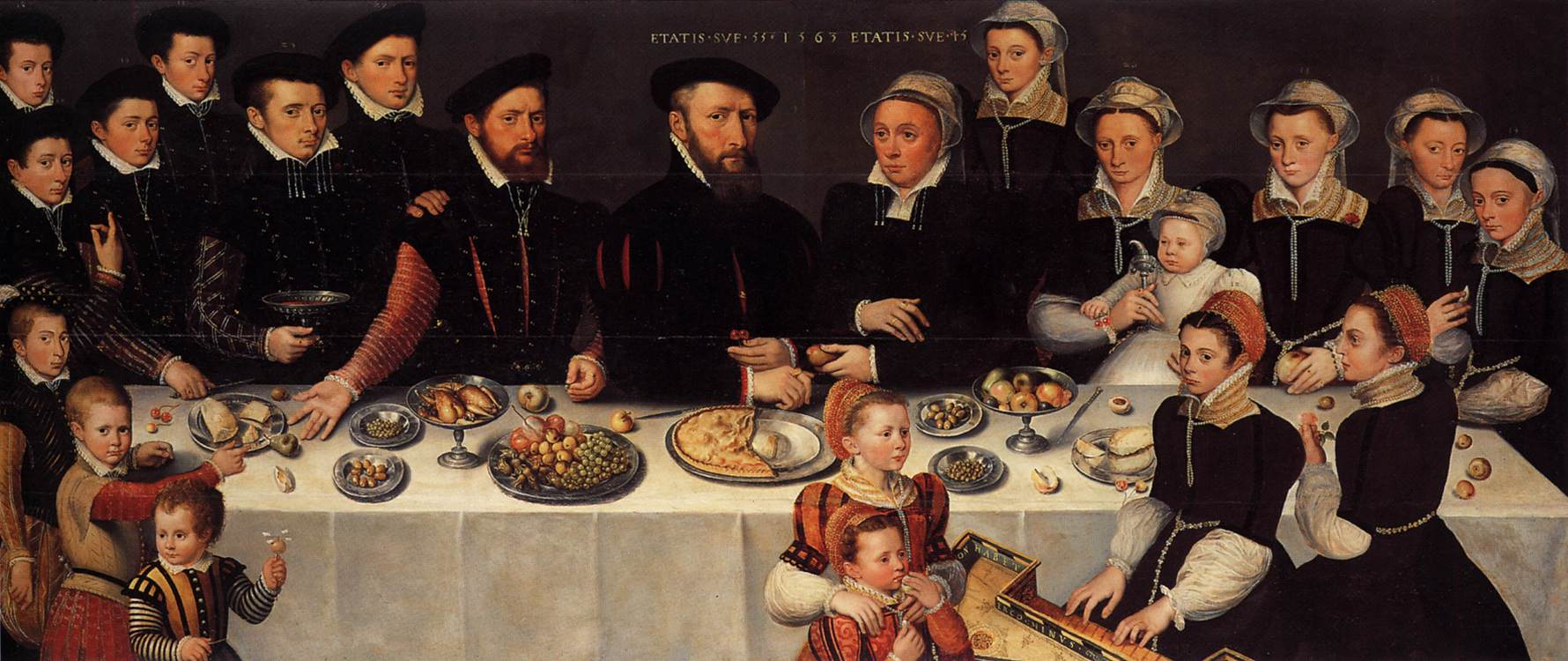
- Portrait of Pierre de Moucheron and his family, in the Rijksmuseum
- Born: 1508; Roussy le Farcque, near Verneuil-sur-Avre, Normandy
- Died: 1567; Antwerp, Duchy of Brabant, Habsburg Netherlands
- Occupation: wine merchant

Pierre de Moucheron (1508–1567) was a wine merchant in Middelburg and later in Antwerp, and the central figure in a family portrait now in the Rijksmuseum, Amsterdam.

== Life ==
Moucheron, the son of Jean de Moucheron (ca. 1490-1543), lord of Boulay, and Marguerite de Coeuvres (ca. 1485-1532), was born in 1508 at Roussy le Farcque, near Verneuil-sur-Avre, Normandy. He was apprenticed to Antonie de Gerbier, a wholesaler in Middelburg, and in 1535 married his master's daughter, Isabeau de Gerbier. They had many children, ten of whom are known by name: Gaspard, François (ca. 1557–after 1610), Pieter, Magdalena, Balthazar (1552-1609), Melchior (1557–after 1617), Thomas, Catharine, Marguerite, and Jacqueline. The family portrait, dated 1563, depicts twenty children.

Moucheron went into business as a wine merchant in Middelburg, in 1545 moving his operations to Antwerp, the main commercial metropolis of the time. Three of his sons went on to found merchant houses in Antwerp. Pierre de Moucheron died in Antwerp in 1567.

His son Cosmo became an architect and engineer and died in Astrakhan. The landscapist Frederik de Moucheron was also a descendant.
