= Isaac de Jouderville =

Dutch painter

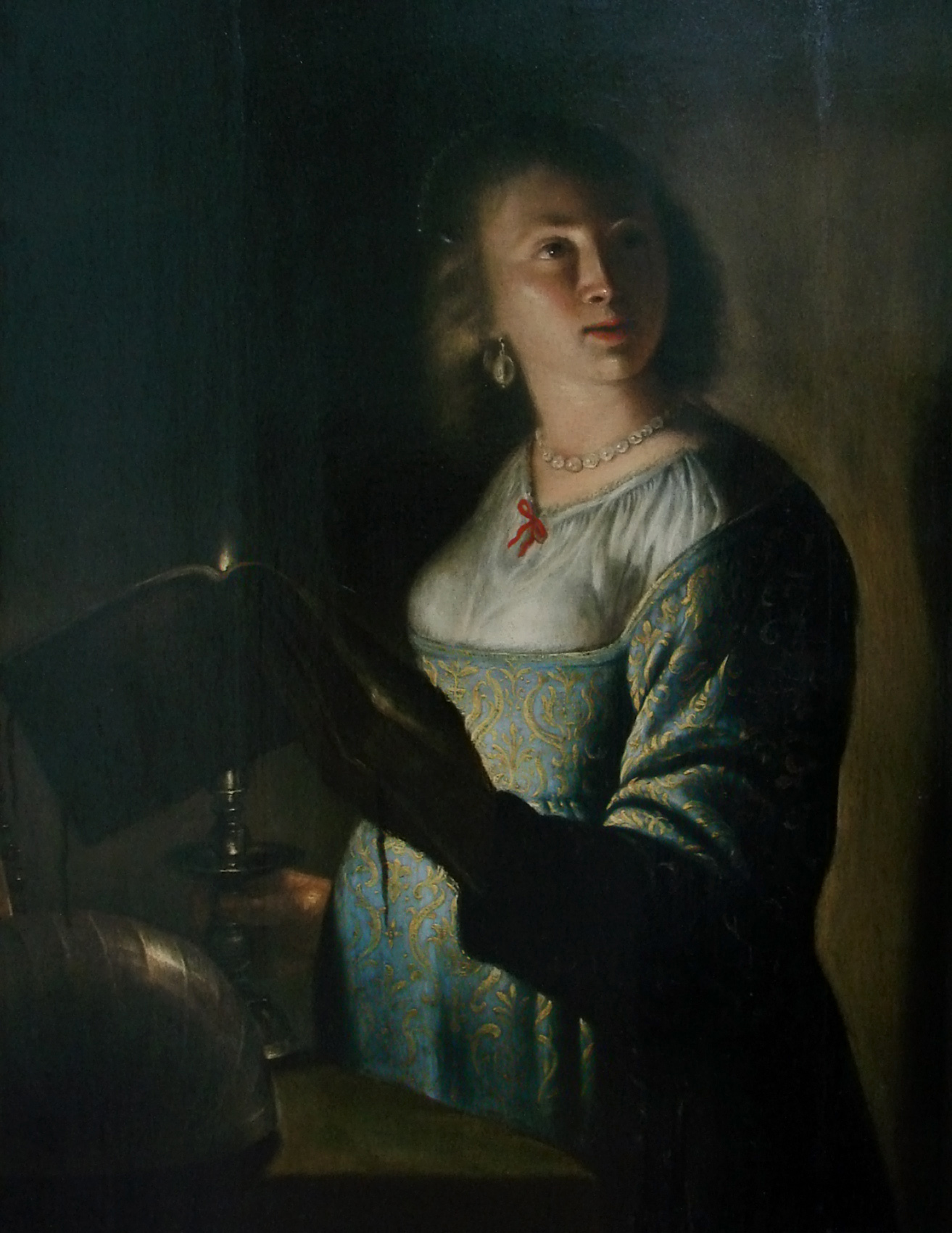
Young woman with book by candlelight

Isaac de Jouderville (1612 in Leiden – 1645 in Amsterdam), was a Dutch Golden Age painter who was a pupil of Rembrandt.

== Biography ==
De Jouderville was an orphan whose parents had come from Metz. He became a pupil of Rembrandt in November 1629 and traveled with him to Amsterdam in 1631. Documents concerning his apprenticeship drawn up by his guardians still exist.

He was back in Leiden to marry Maria le Febure (1619-1653) in 1636 and moved to Deventer in 1641. He lived in Deventer for a few years only; in 1643 he was back in Amsterdam, where he died young in 1645. His widow Maria married the glassmaker Pieter de Melder in 1648 and his daughter Mariecke, later married the painter Frederik de Moucheron.

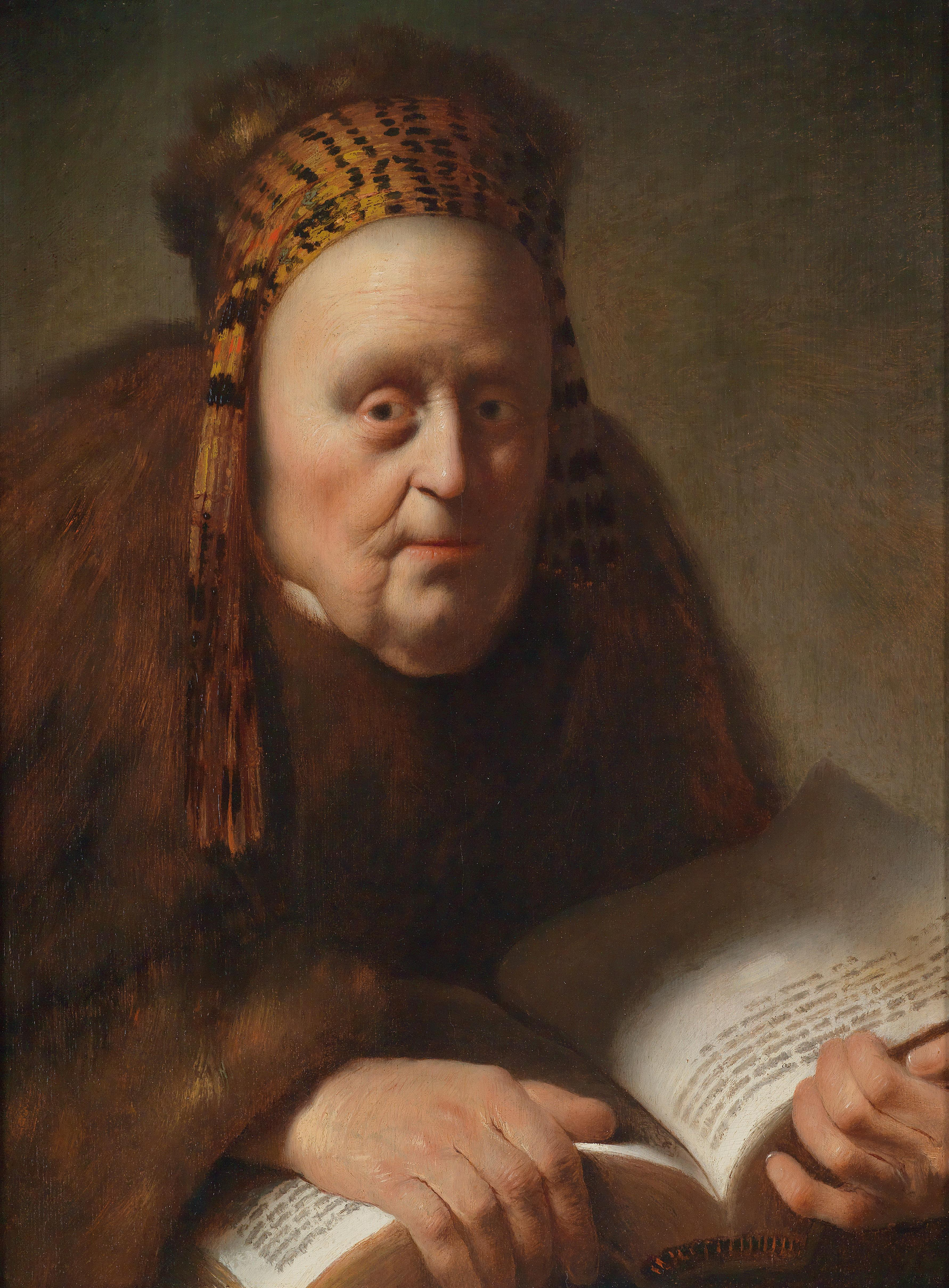
Old woman with book

After Maria le Febure died, her second husband claimed he was unable to support his wife's three children by her first husband, along with his own two children, though he offered to raise Jacob Jouderville to the age of 18. By that time De Melder was acting as art dealer, and the liquidation of his wife's goods shows an interesting list of artists who were either owed money by her estate or who owed money to her estate (f=guilders; st.=pieces):

=== Owers to the estate ===
- Bartholomeus van der Helst 31 f. 11 st.
- Simon de Vlieger 15 f. 6 st.
- Claes Outhuysen 3 f. 4 st.
- Steven van Goor 6 f. 2 st.
- Hendrick Mombers of Haarlem 138 f. 5 st.
- de Jonge Beecker 26 f.
- Hermanus Nauwingh of Hamburgh 5 f. 14 st.
- Johannes Lingelbach 19 st.
- Marten Switzer (Kretser ?) 7 f.
- Jan Looten 20 f. 3 st.
- Hendrik Ulenburgh 105 f. 10 st.
- Johannes de Renialme 4 f. 12 st.
- the son of the councilman Dr. Tulp 14 f. 15 st.
- Johannes Victor 9 f. 19 st.
- Paulus Henneken 3 f. 19 st.
- Willem van de Velde 2 f. 16 st.
- Simon Luttichuysen 5 f. 12 st.
- Ferdinandus de Bos (Bol ?) 1 f. 2 st.
- Sr. Stockade 1 f..

=== Owed by the estate ===
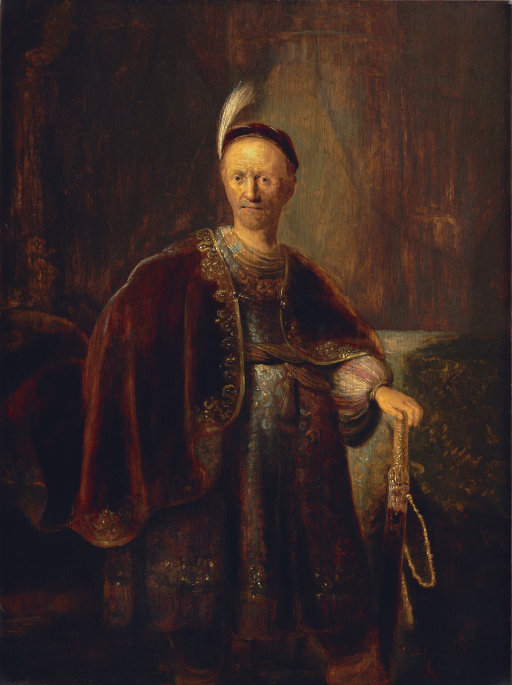
Man in an Oriental costume

- Jacob Coningh 14 f. 15 st.
- Kamphuijsen, painter, 14 f. 5 st.
- the assistant van Camphuijsen 11 f. 8 st.
- Mr. Schendel 5 f. 11 st..
- Jannetje living in Dordrecht must receive for speldewerck (needlework) bought from her 270 f. 19 st.
- Agnietje van Dalm ibid 159 f. 11 st.
- Johannes Boot, as stated above, 269 f.
- Teunis Teunisz. van Bronckhorst must receive for delivered frames 28 f. 1 st.
- Philips Wouwerman, painter, must receive 64 f.
- Job Bercheyden, painter, must receive [left blank].

Isaac de Jouderville's painting Man in Oriental costume was featured in the fourth episode of the BBC TV programme, Fake or Fortune?. This painting was part of the stock of dealers Jakob and Rosa Oppenheimer that was seized by the Nazis and sold in 1935. It resurfaced at a Cape Town auction house in 2010. It was then, and still is today, listed in the Lost Art Database run by the Koordinierungsstelle für Kulturgutverluste in Magdeburg, Germany. It was subject to a long legal dispute as to whether the work was listed there legally. In February 2015 the Federal Administrative Court of Germany held that the Koordinierungsstelle did not have to delete it.

Jouderville is known today for portraits and historical allegories. Jouderville painted mainly Rembrandtesque heads or ‘tronies’. He was such a faithful follower of his master’s early work that several of his paintings were previously attributed to Rembrandt.
