= Joris van Spilbergen =

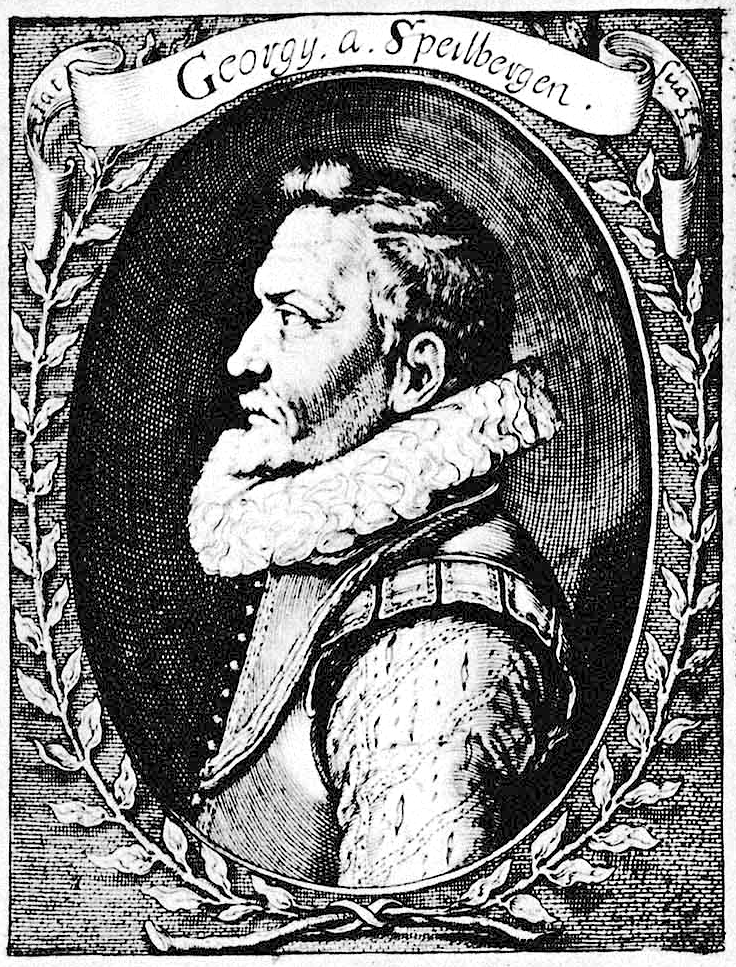
- Joris van Spilbergen
- Born: 1 November 1568; Antwerp
- Died: 13 January 1620 (age 51); Bergen op Zoom
- Occupation: Naval officer

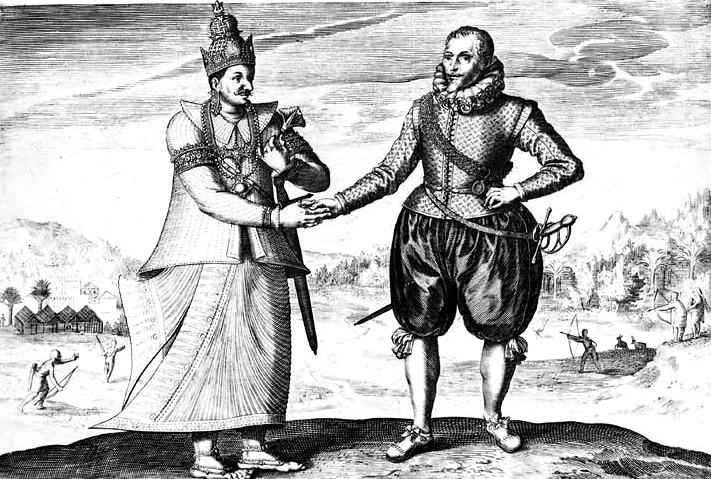
Spilbergen meeting King Vimaladharmasuriya I of Kandy in 1602

Joris van Spilbergen (1 November 1568 in Antwerp – 13 January 1620 in Bergen op Zoom) was a Dutch naval officer.

His first major expedition was in 1596, when he sailed to Africa.

He then left for Asia on 5 May 1601, from Veere, a seaport on the island of Walcheren in Zealand, in command of the fleet of the company of Balthazar de Moucheron (a trading company before the establishment of the VOC). His ships were the Ram, Schaap, and Lam. Spilbergen met the king of Kandy (Sri Lanka) Vimala Dharma Suriya in 1602, and discussed the possibility of trade in cinnamon.

In 1607, Spilbergen, onboard Aeolus, was with Jacob van Heemskerk at the Battle of Gibraltar.

In 1614, he sailed beyond the Strait of Magellan with an expedition of five ships. Despite the fact that the Twelve Years' Truce between Spain and the Dutch Republic was in force, he raided the Spanish settlements on the coast of Mexico and South America. He fought the Spanish at Callao, Acapulco and Navidad. On October 26, he captured the pearl fishing ship San Francisco at Zacatula. After sacking the village of Santos in 1615, aiming to weaken the Spanish-Portuguese influence in South America (but being repelled by the local population), he sailed across the Pacific Ocean to the Mariana Islands, the Philippine Islands and eventually to Ternate in the Maluku Islands in March 1616. He fought in the Second Battle of Playa Honda and was defeated by the Spanish Armada in the Spanish East Indies (Philippines). He circumnavigated the earth, and returned to the Dutch Republic in 1617.

He died a poor man in Bergen op Zoom in 1620.

== General and cited references ==
- Quanchi, Max (2005). Historical Dictionary of the Discovery and Exploration of the Pacific Islands. The Scarecrow Press. ISBN 0810853957.
