= Daniël Schellinks =

Dutch painter (1627–1701)

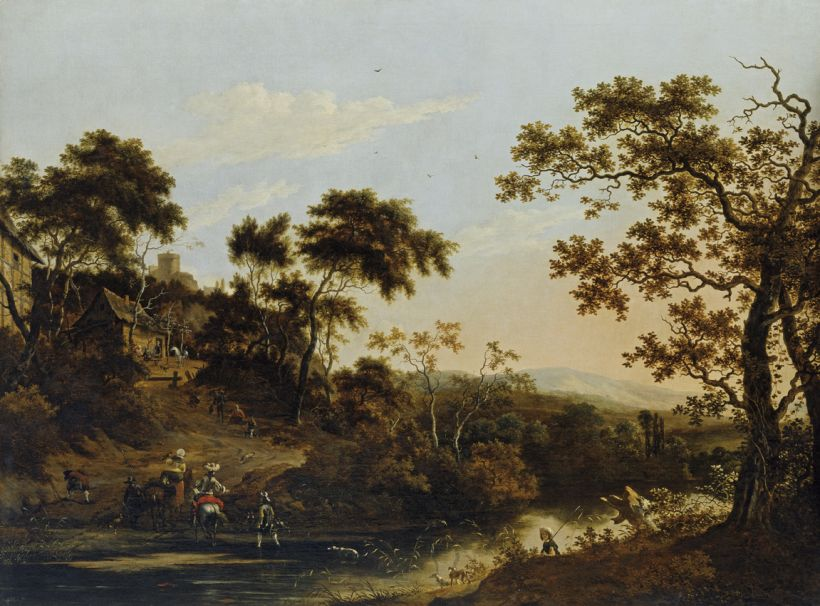
River Landscape with Ford and Hunting Company

Daniël Schellinks (Note: alternatively spelled Schellincks, Schellinger, or Schellinx) (baptized 11 November 1627 – buried 23 September 1701) was a Dutch silk trader and amateur painter and draughtsman of Italianate landscapes and marine scenes.

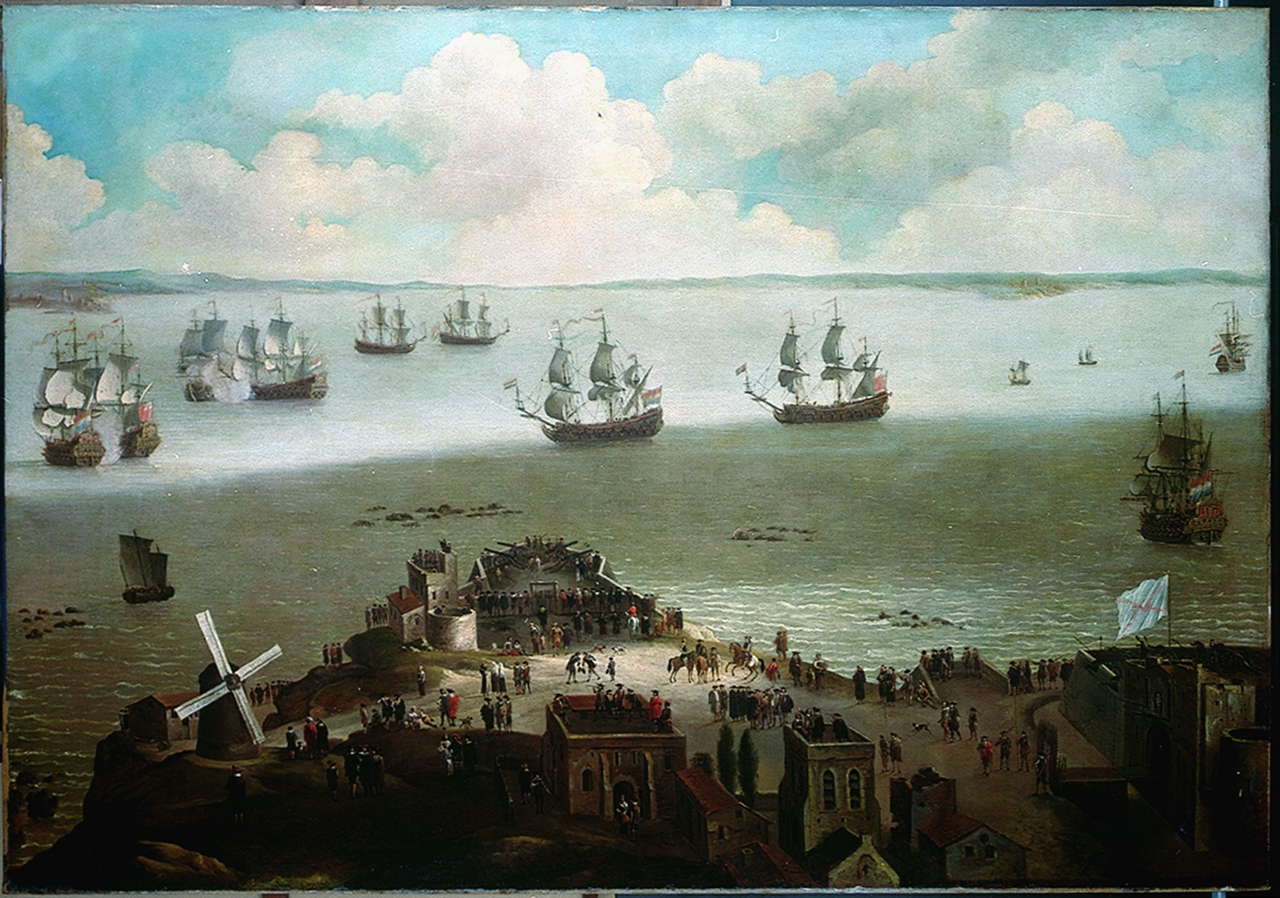
HM Ship Tiger Taking the Schakerloo in the Harbour of Cadiz, 23 February 1674

== Life ==
Daniël Schellinks was born in Amsterdam as the younger brother of Willem Schellinks. Little is known about Schellinks' life, training or artistic development. While his brother trained as an artist and specialised in atmospheric Italianate pictures, Schellinks does not appear to have had a formal artistic training. Both Schellinks brothers visited Italy. When Schellinks married in 1662, he called himself the owner of a clothier's business.

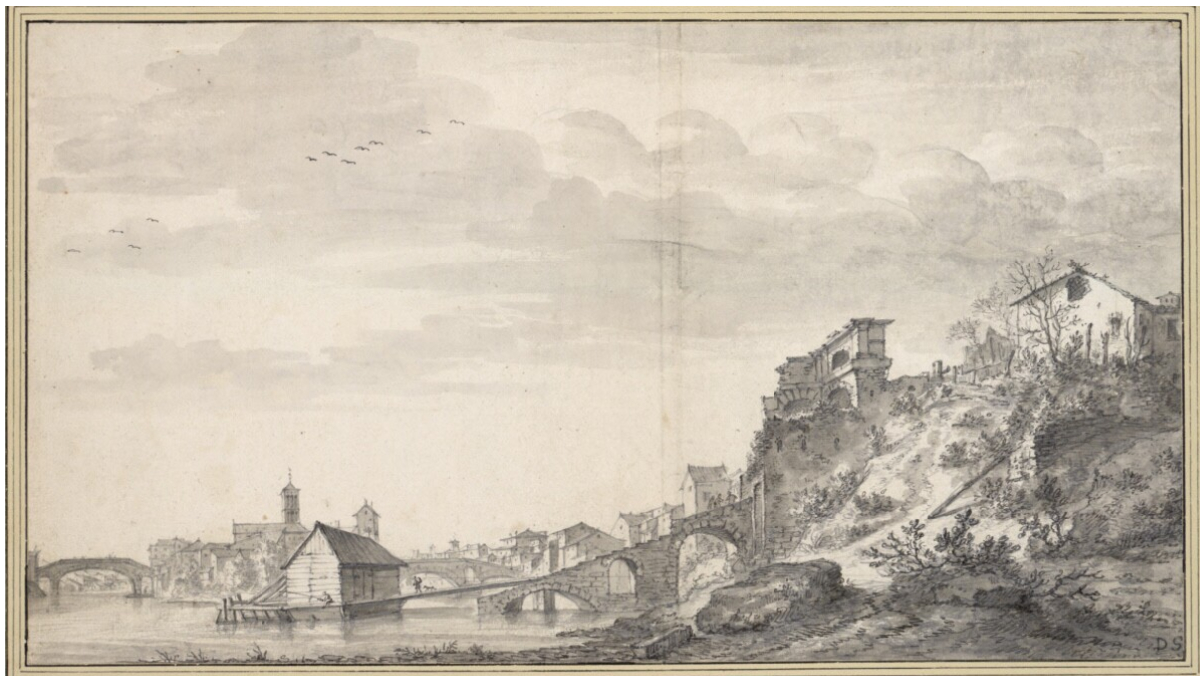
View of the Tiber at Trastevere with the Island on the Tiber

== Work ==
Only a few works are definitively attributed to Daniël Schellinks. They are almost all based on works by his elder brother Willem. Schellinks' profession was a silk trader and he was only an amateur artist. It is believed that many of his works have been wrongly attributed to other artists.

Schellinks and his brother Willem form part of the Dutch landscape and genre artists active in the 16th and 17th centuries who depicted Italian scenes, either real or imaginary. They are referred to as the 'Italianates'. They were influenced by Italian models and attempted to capture the Mediterranean light through a colourful style of painting with delicate atmospheric effects. While a number of the Italianates visited and even worked in Italy, some never did but relied for their Italianate scenes on the works of artists who had in fact been there and had brought the Italianate style to their native country upon their return. The Dutch architectural painter Jan van der Heyden, for instance, likely never visited Italy but is believed to have used some of Daniël Schellinks' drawings for his Italianate paintings. Like his brother, Daniël also painted a few marine scenes.
