= Olivier Brunel =

Dutch merchant and explorer

Olivier Brunel (c. 1552–1585) was a Dutch merchant and explorer. He was the first to establish trade between the Netherlands and Russia. He also explored the northern coast of Russia, searching for a maritime trade route to China and the East Indies.

He was born in Brussels in the Province of Brabant.

He sailed for Kholmogory in Russia, but the English, who were already established there, denounced him as a spy to the Russian government, and he was imprisoned for several years at Yaroslavl. He was freed through the efforts of brothers Jacov and Grigory Anikiew, employees of the Stroganovs. He worked for them, participating in annual expeditions to the east. He convinced his employers to open up trade with the Dutch.

In 1580, the Pet and Jackman Expedition sought the Northeast Passage for the English Muscovy Company. The Russian authorities built two ships to do the same, and recruited Brunel to travel to Antwerp and hire crews. However, Brunel's first loyalty was to his homeland. While the Dutch government provided no financial support, he piqued the interest of Balthazar de Moucheron, and the "first Netherland [sic] Arctic voyage was undertaken in 1584". He traded along the way, but on his return, the ship and its cargo of "rich cargo of valuable furs, mountain-crystal, and Muscovy glass, was wrecked in the shallow mouth of the Petchora river."

Brunel then convinced the king of Denmark to commission him to search for long-lost colonies in Greenland, but after three failed attempts, he gave up. Little is known of the remainder of his life.
