= Herman Naiwincx =

Dutch painter

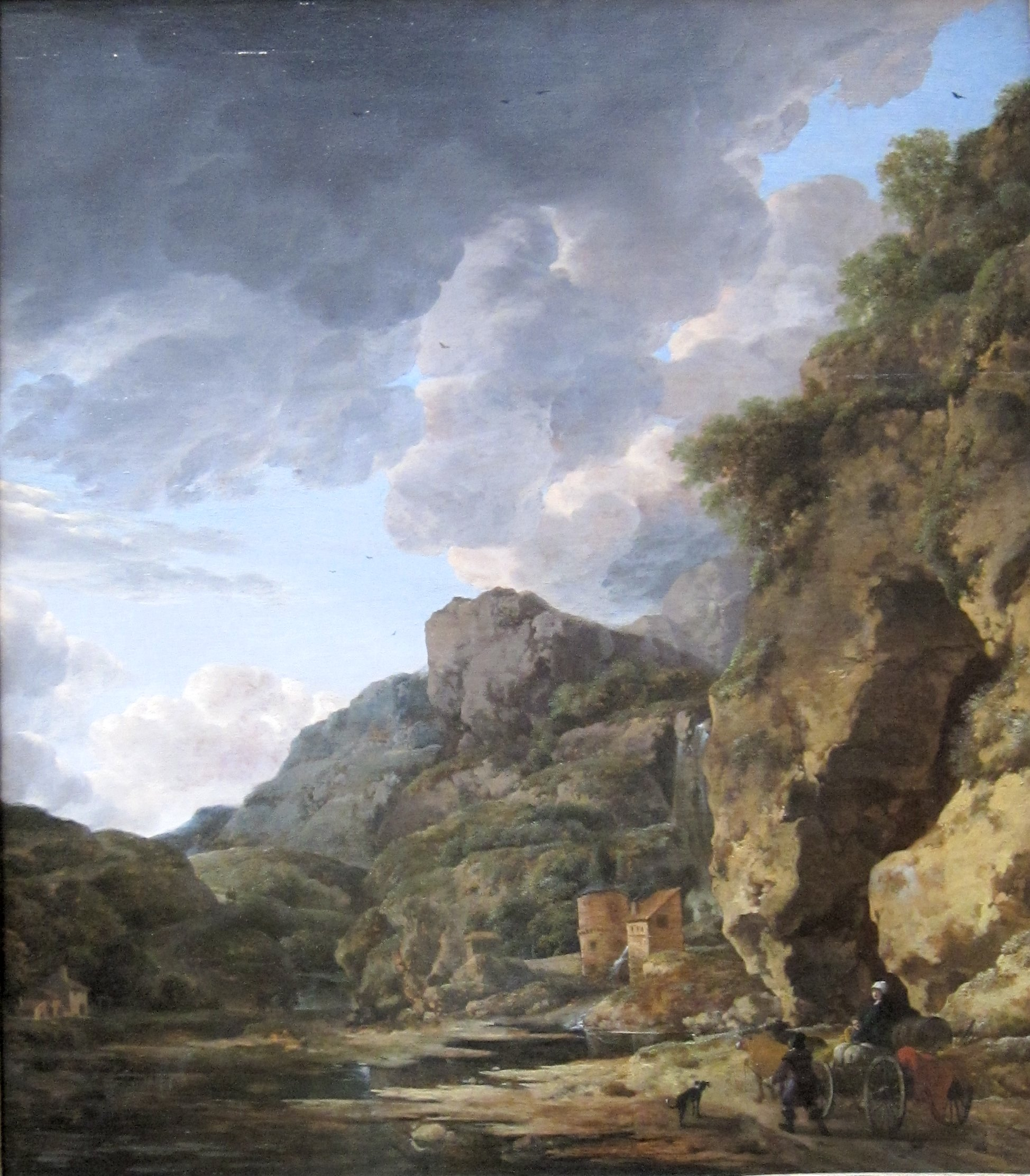
Mountain Landscape with River and Wagon, by Herman Nauwincx and Willem Schellinks

Herman Naiwincx (1623, Schoonhoven – 1670, Hamburg), was a Dutch Golden Age landscape painter and printmaker.

== Biography ==
According to the RKD he worked in Amsterdam from 1648 to 1650 and in Schoonhoven in 1651. He is known for prints, Italianate landscapes and architectural studies. He is known for working with Willem Schellinks.

It is unknown whether he moved to Hamburg, or died there on one of his business trips.
