= Balthazar de Moucheron =

Dutch trader

Balthazar de Moucheron (1552–1630) was a Dutch trader, ship owner, and one of the founders of the Dutch East India Company, but never participated as he went bankrupt in the same year. He is known for his early trading with India (Calcutta) and Indonesia, America, the west coast of Africa, the Baltic Sea, and the White Sea (Archangelsk).

== Early life ==
His father was Pierre de Moucheron (1508–1565). Pierre was from the French province of Le Perche (parish Boissy-le-Sec in the south of Verneuil-sur-Avre) and was a descendant of the House of Bouley Moucheron. He moved from Normandy to Middelburg in 1530 and found a job with the trader Antoine de Gerbier. He married his master's daughter Isabeau in 1533. Pierre's father became a wealthy merchant due to business activities in the Netherlands, France, Spain, and England. In 1545, he moved his trade house to Antwerp, at that time the trading center of the region.

== Adulthood ==
Alexander Farnese was sent to subdue a revolt in the Southern Netherlands. In 1584, Spain controlled most of the area, except for a handful of great cities. In the besieged city of Antwerp, a Night Watch was assembled, in which Balthazar was a colonel. After a failed attempt by Holland and Zeeland to free the city, Antwerp surrendered. Balthazar helped negotiate its capitulation. The terms of surrender stated that all Protestant citizens had four years to leave the city. In 1585, after the Fall of Antwerp, Balthazar moved his business to Middelburg.

== Northern passage ==
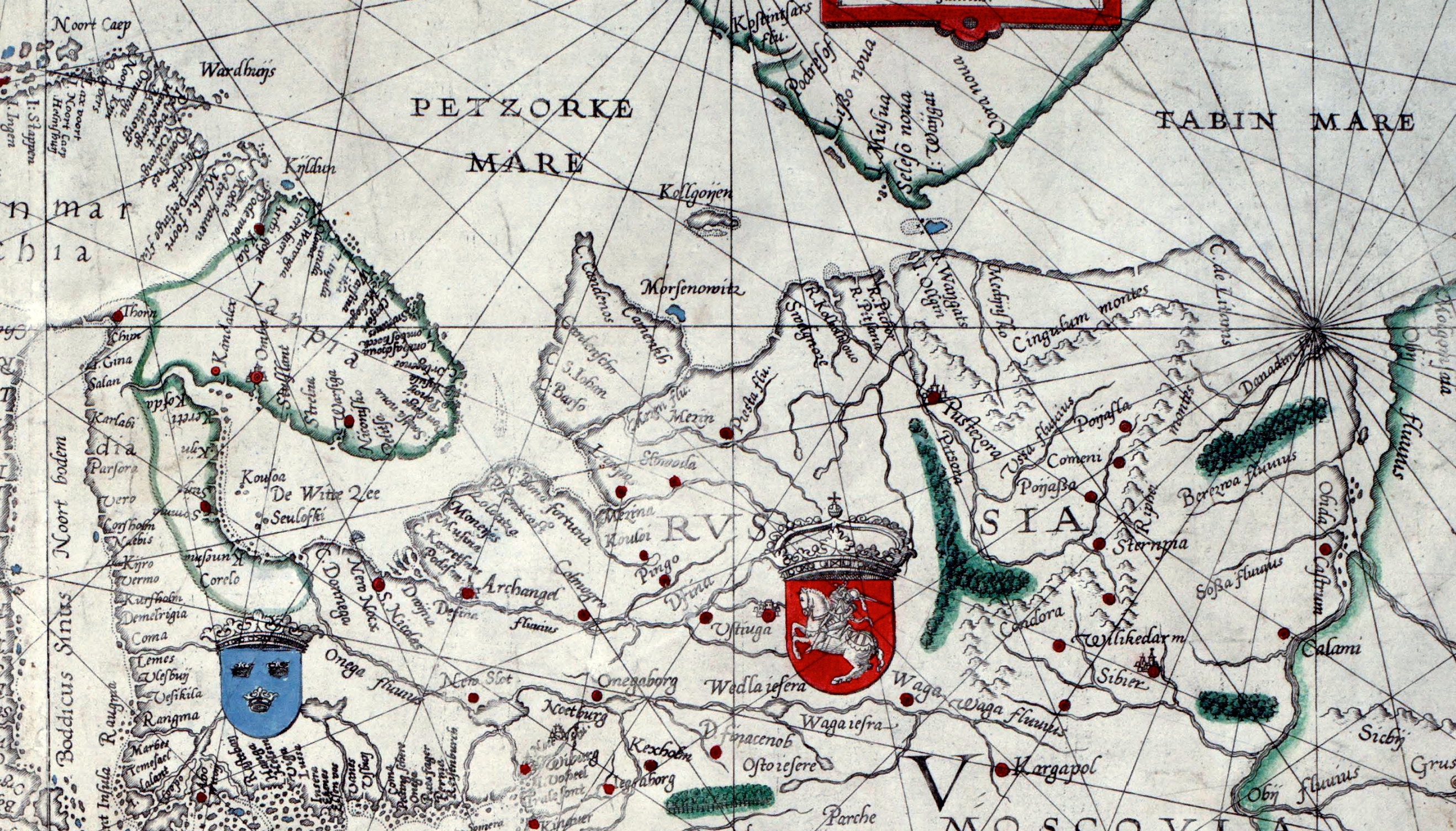
The northern trade routes in 1589, from the North Cape to Waygats

Balthazar played an important role in the search for a Northern passage to the Indies. He was most likely inspired by his connection with Olivier Brunel. He sent a request to Prince Willem van Oranje in 1584 that remained unanswered due to the turbulent times. Balthazar and Brunel then initiated the search on their account with limited success. A new request in 1594 was accepted by the prince but was deemed of too high importance for two traders to do on their own, and the Staten Generaal (precursor of the parliament) took control.

In 1594, Zeeland and Amsterdam equipped four ships for the expedition. Willem Barentsz sailed for Amsterdam and Cornelis Nay for Zeeland. Balthazar accepted reluctantly but was unhappy that he was only appointed as an advisor. The fleet sailed on 5 June 1594. They were hampered by large ice plains, but on August 11 they found open waters on the Kara Sea and assumed this was the long-sought passage. The fleet returned to the Netherlands and reported on these findings. Balthazar sent his brother Melchior as a trading agent to the mouth of the Dwina at the White Sea.

== Trade routes through the Cape ==
In 1597, Cornelis de Houtman succeeded in the so-called Eerste Schipvaart (first expedition) to sail to Indonesia via the Cape of Good Hope. Thereafter, Balthazar focused on that route. In 1597, he acquired a house in Veere founded the Veerse Compagnie, and became a main shareholder.

In 1598, the Veerse Compagnie sent two ships, De Leeuw (the lion) and the Leeuwin (the lioness), under the supervision of Cornelis and Frederik de Houtman to East India. The fleet returned in 1600 without the two brothers. Cornelis was killed and Frederik was captured on Atjeh. Initially, the expedition was not a financial success. Balthazar sent five more ships, with a crew of 100 sailors and 150 soldiers, on a mission to capture Príncipe on the West African shore, to establish a supply point for further explorations. The expedition took the island from the Portuguese by a surprise attack, but before reinforcements arrived, the island was re-captured.

== Expeditions ==
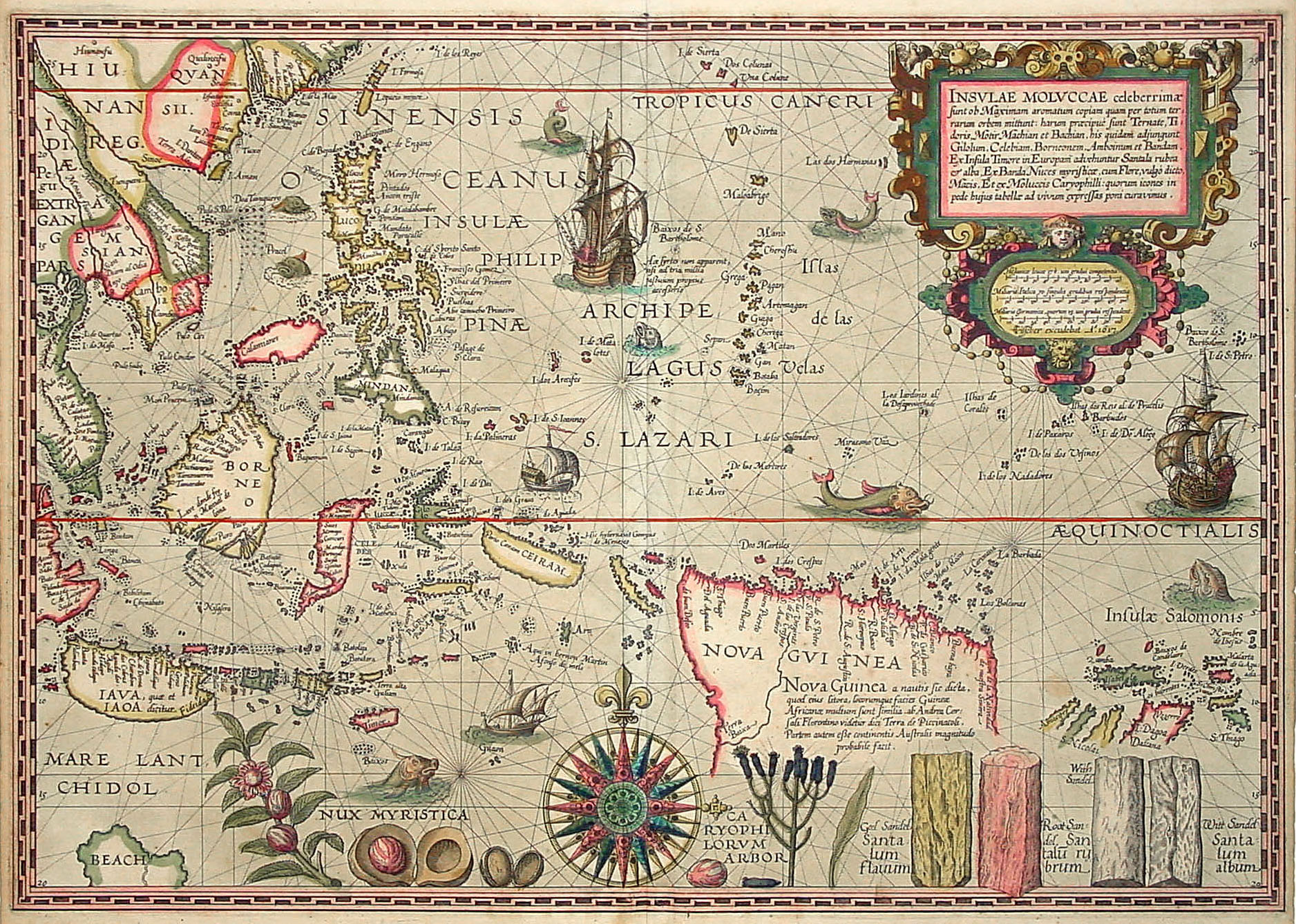
Maluku Islands

Balthazar commissioned Joris van Spilbergen, who sailed in May 1600 with four ships to India. The expedition turned back after capturing a Spanish ship en route. Moucheron was supported by stadtholder Maurits of Orange.

Through a merger of the Veerse Compagnie and the Middelburgsche Compagnie (Compagnie van Tenhaeff) in November 1600, the Verenigde Zeeuwse Compagnie (United company of Zeeland) was founded. Balthazar left the company at that point. Only Pieter van Hecke and Pierre le Moyne remained loyal; they formed the Compagnie van De Moucheron in 1601. The company eventually helped with the founding of the Dutch East India Company but demanded a payment delay, protection from his creditors, and free passage on the east coast of Africa (Mozambique).

In 1601 he sent Joris van Spilbergen with three ships, Ram, Schaap, and Lam, on a successful expedition to establish trade relations with the Kingdom of Kandy. They eventually reached Atjeh.

Van Spilbergen met the king of Kandy (Sri Lanka), Vimala Dharma Suriya, in 1602 and discussed the possibility of trade in cinnamon. When van Spilbergen returned to Zeeland in 1604, carrying rubies, sapphires, topazes and other gemstones that he had received as a gift from the maharajah of Kandy, the independent companies of Holland and Zeeland had already merged to form the Dutch East India Company. One year before the expedition returned from their travels, Balthazar declared bankruptcy and fled to France.

== Personal life ==
Balthazar was married twice. His first wife was Jacqueline de la Croix, who died in 1589. In 1591 he married Elysabeth Berwoudts Van Crompvliet in Delft. Around 1630 he died in poverty in France.

== Biography ==
- De Jonge, J. K. J. (1862). De opkomst van het Nederlandsch gezag in Oost-Indië, 1595–1610. (in Dutch). Den Haag: Martinus Nijhoff
- Unger, W. S. (1948). De oudste reizen van de Zeeuwen naar Oost-Indië. (in Dutch). Den Haag: Martinus Nijhoff.
- Wijnroks, E. H. (2003). Handel tussen Rusland en de Nederlanden, 1560–1640. (in Dutch). Hilversum.
