= Frederik de Moucheron =

Dutch Golden Age landscape painter and draughtsman

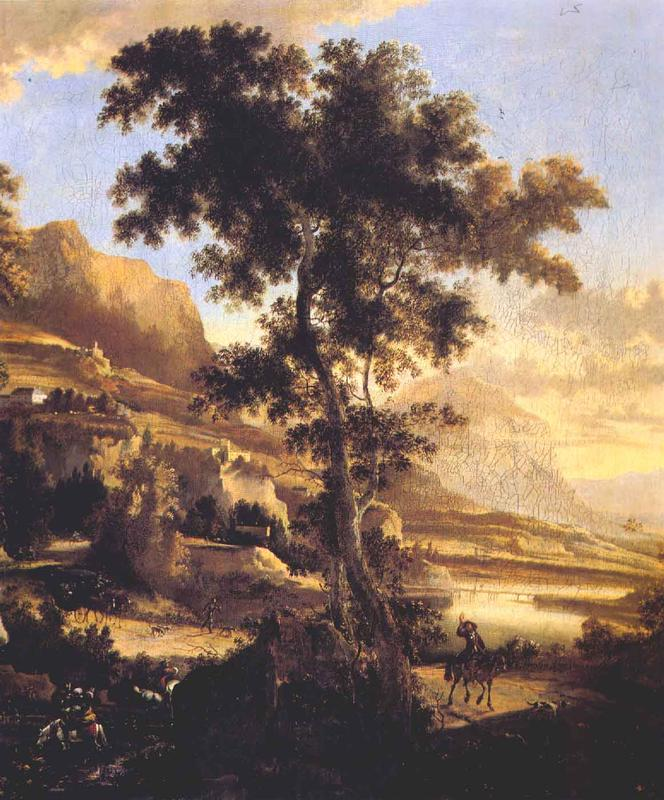
- Landscape with a horseman, 1670s
- Born: 1633; Emden, East Frisia
- Died: 5 January 1686 (aged 52–53); Amsterdam, Holland, The Netherlands
- Known for: Landscape painting
- Movement: Baroque
- Children: Isaac

Frederik de Moucheron (1633 – 5 January 1686) was a Dutch Golden Age landscape painter and draughtsman. He mainly produced (Italianate) landscapes that were furnished with human and animal figures by various colleagues.

== Biography ==
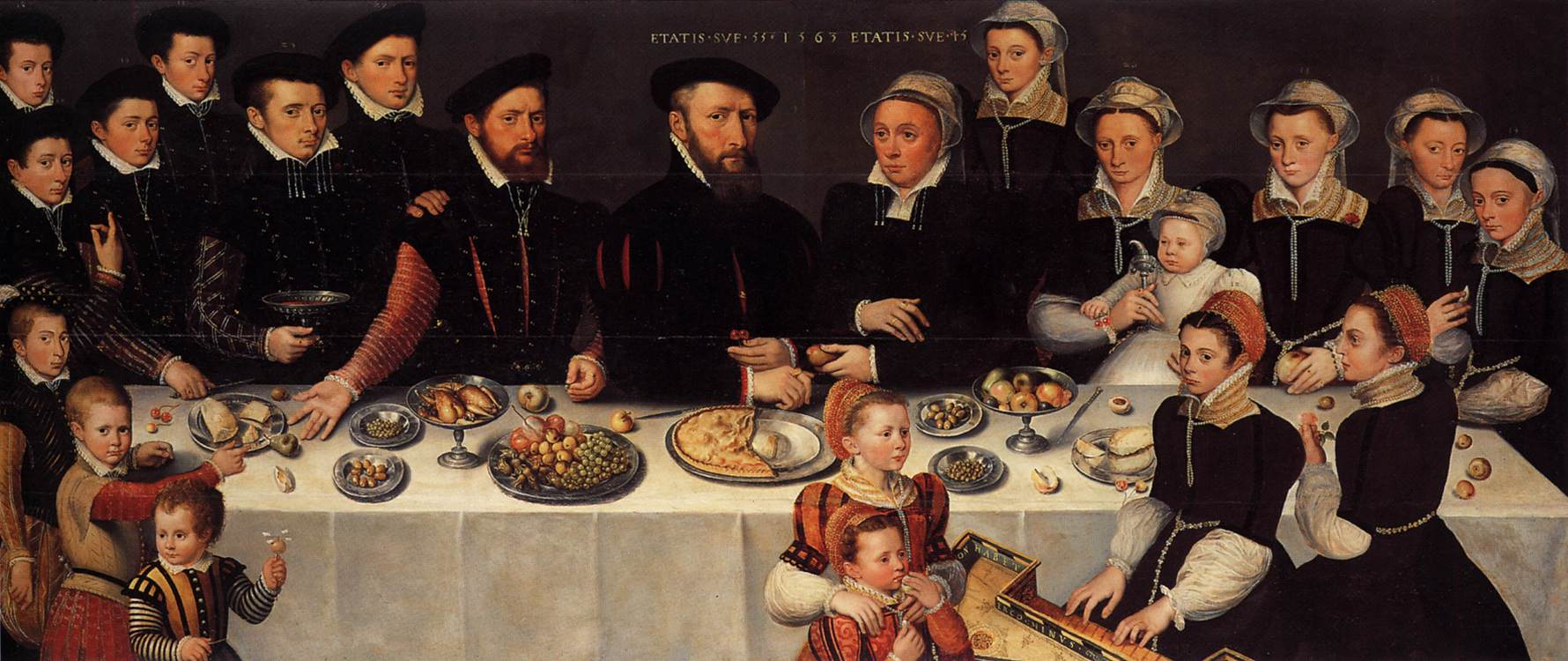
Moucheron Family portrait, 1563, collection Rijksmuseum

Frederik de Moucheron was the son of the painter Balthazar de Moucheron and Cornelia van Brouckhoven. His father came from a wealthy family of merchants and wine traders and is portrayed as one of the younger sons in the family portrait of Pierre de Moucheron (1583). Frederik trained with Jan Asselijn and became a landscape painter. He set off at age 22 for Paris, where he spent three years and made a tour to Lyon, Italy and Greece. In 1659 he settled in Amsterdam (Jordaan) and married Mariecke de Jouderville, the daughter of Isaac de Jouderville; they had eight children when he died. He is buried in Amsterdam. In 1719 his widow died in Sint Antoniesbreestraat.

He painted French, Italian, and Dutch landscapes. To finish these scenes, contemporaries specialized in painting figures collaborated with him, such as Adriaen van de Velde in Amsterdam, Theodor Helmbreker in Paris, and at times Johannes Lingelbach, and Nicolaes Pieterszoon Berchem.

De Moucheron's son Isaac, named after his grandfather who was a Rembrandt pupil, became a popular engraver and painter, with many of his landscape wall decorations surviving in Amsterdam.
