= Portrait of Dirck van Os =

Painting by Rembrandt, c. 1658

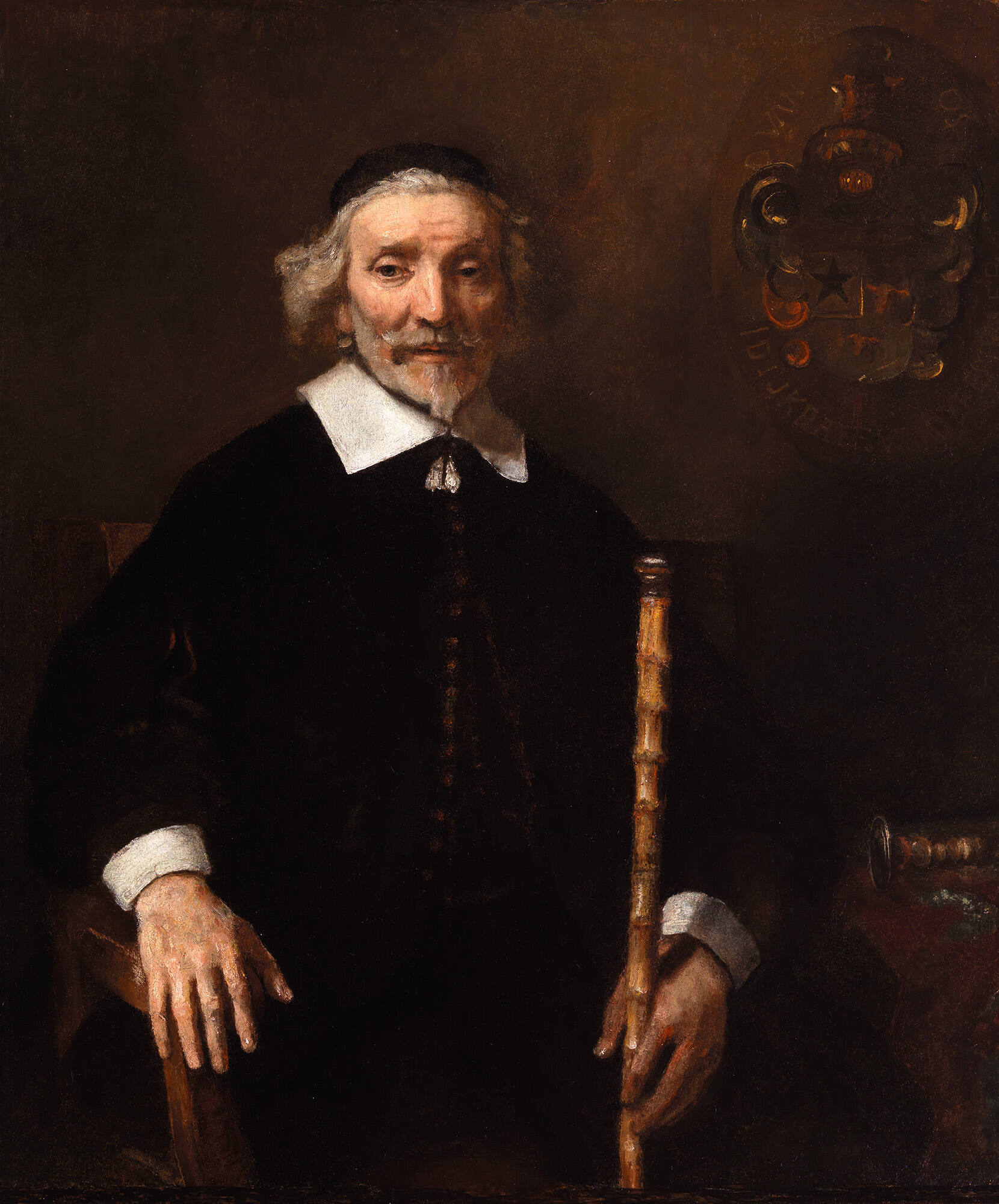
- Artist: Rembrandt
- Year: 1658
- Medium: Oil on canvas
- Dimensions: 103.505 cm × 87.63 cm (40.750 in × 34.50 in)
- Location: Joslyn Art Museum; Omaha, Nebraska

The Portrait of Dirck van Os is a later painting by Rembrandt (1606–1669), created circa 1658. It is currently in the permanent collection of the Joslyn Art Museum in Omaha, Nebraska.

In 1898, the portrait was acquired by a New York art dealer from a private collector in St. Petersburg, Russia. In 1899, the portrait was sold to Boston businessman Frederick Sears. The painting was purchased by the Joslyn Museum in 1942 from a private collection. Initially believed to have been painted by Rembrandt himself, the painting was later reclassified as a painting from the "School of Rembrandt"; the likely work of one of Rembrandt's students. In the spring of 2012, under the guidance of Ernst van de Wetering, one of the world's foremost authorities on Rembrandt, the museum sent the painting to Amsterdam for further study and treatment. Martin Bijl, former head of restoration at the Rijksmuseum in Amsterdam, worked with van de Wethering on the painting's conservation. The determination that the painting was a true Rembrandt was made during the conservation process.

The subject depicted in the painting is Dirck van Os III (1590–1668), a prominent Dutch citizen. He was the son of Dirck van Os (Antwerp 13 March 1556 – Amsterdam 20 May 1615), an Amsterdam merchant, insurer, financier, and shipowner. The elder van Os was one of the founders of the Compagnie van Verre, the Amsterdam Exchange Bank, and the United East India Company (VOC). The painting shows van Os as an elderly man, seated holding a cane in his left hand, donning a black robe with white collar and cuffs, and wearing a cap. During the restoration process, it was determined that later additions to the painting included lace around the collar and a chain with a cross hanging from the subject's neck. The embellishments were removed during the restoration process.

The restored painting was unveiled in the Joslyn Art Museum's Hitchcock Foundation Gallery on May 5, 2014 and is part of the museum's permanent collection.

In November 2016 the Joslyn Art Museum unveiled a newly commission frame for the painting. The painting was originally displayed in an ornate gilded Louis XIV frame, which framed the portrait when it was acquired by the museum in 1942. The new frame is less ornate. The frame, as described by the Joslyn's associate curator of European art, "It is a restrained style of framing that corresponds with the conservative Protestant sensibility of the age and to the strong mercantile culture of the Netherland, which profited from importing exotic woods through the Dutch East India Company." The frame was paid for by the Joslyn Art Museum Association.

== See also ==
- List of paintings by Rembrandt
