= Nicolaes Hasselaer =

Dutch brewer

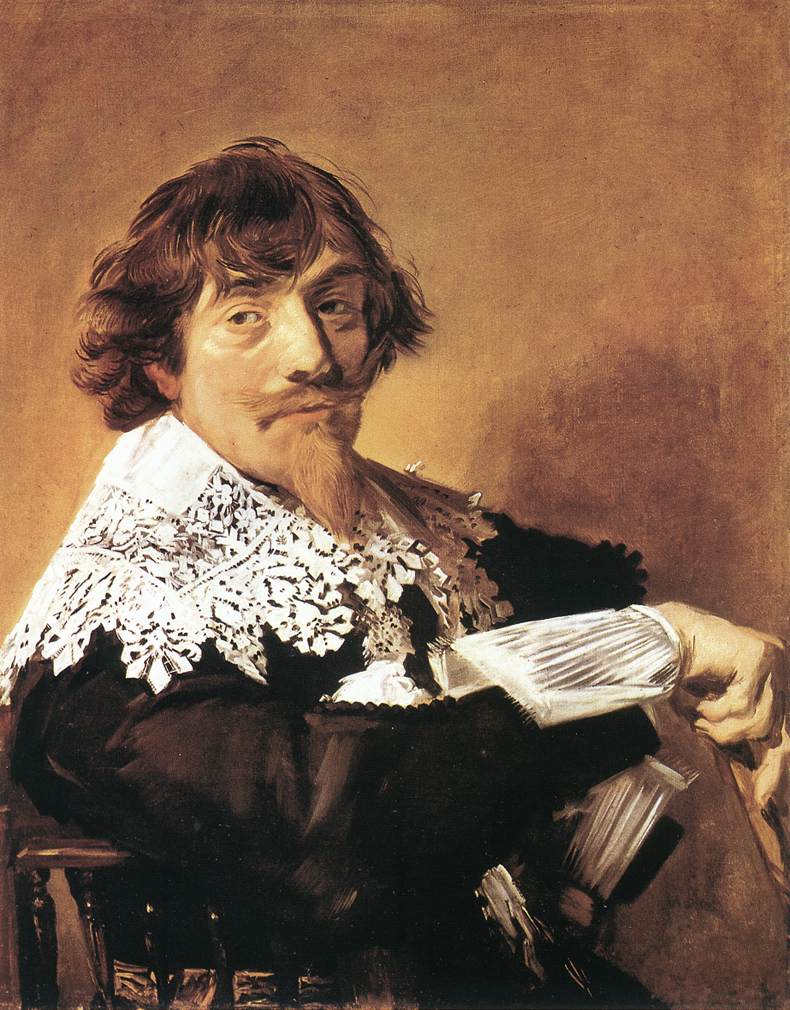
Nicolaes Hasselaer, c.1630-1633

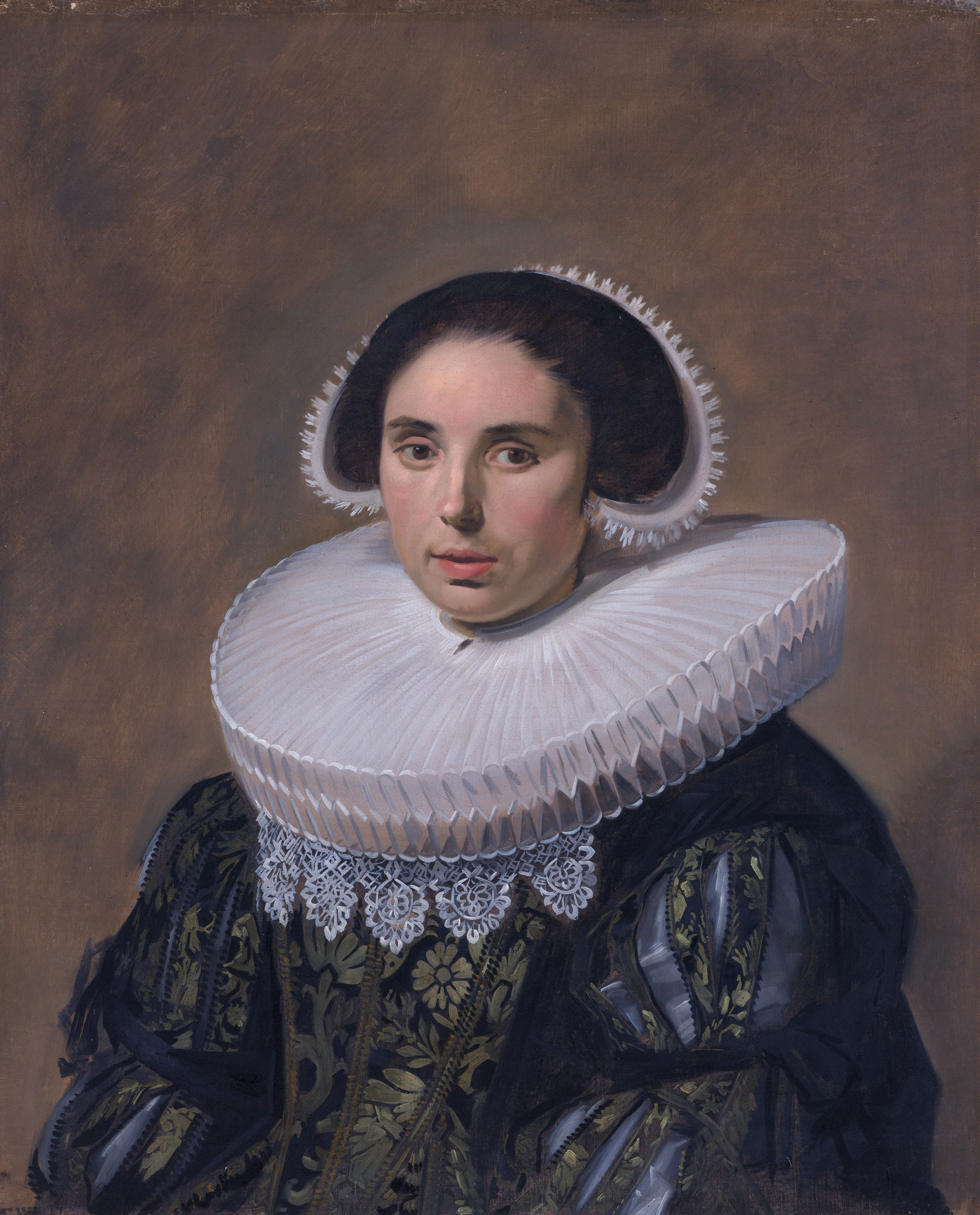
Pendant marriage portrait of his second wife, Sara Wolphaerts van Diemen (1594-1667)

Nicolaes Hasselaer (1593 – 1635), was a Dutch Golden Age brewer and major of the Amsterdam schutterij, who is best known today for his portrait by Frans Hals.

== Biography ==
He was born in Amsterdam as the son of Pieter Dirksz Hasselaer, brewer of the Witte Arent, and a founding member of the Dutch East India Company. Nicolaes became known in the 18th century for his biography by Jan Wagenaar in his history of Amsterdam, who claimed he saved a remonstrant's family from a mob in 1627, and in 1629, he saved the Dutch West India Company from a raid (the building housed the silver bounty brought back by the local hero Piet Pieterszoon Hein). He was held in such high respect that the mobs dispersed without him ever needing to fire a shot. He was mentioned for his bravery in a poem by Vondel. His reason for defending the WIC headquarters was personal, since he was listed in their investor's catalog Groot-Kapitaalboek twice, for the sums of 4000 guilders and 2000 guilders. That is worth about 420,000 euros in 2010. He married Geertruid van Erp on 29 December 1619 and their son Gerrit was baptized in the Nieuwe Kerk on 13 October 1620. Geertruid van Erp apparently didn't survive and Claes married a second time to Sara Wolphaerts van Diemen on 14 August 1622. They in turn had a daughter Geertruyd Hasselaer who was baptized in the Oude Kerk on 18 April 1624, followed by Anna on 5 April 1626, and Aefje on 17 May 1629.

== Hals portrait ==
The pendant portraits of Nicolaes and his bride Sara are currently in the Rijksmuseum, where they were part of a bequest in 1885 by J. S. R. van de Poll. Since 2007, the sitters of these undated and uninscribed portraits have been disputed. His portrait was documented by Hofstede de Groot in 1910, who claimed that contrary to what the museum states, this is in fact a portrait of Nicolaes' brother Dirk Hasselaer the younger:

"186. DIRK PIETERSZ HASSELAER (probably). M. 42. Half-length. He sits on a chair facing right, with his head three-quarters right, and looks down to the left. He has a moustache and pointed beard; his hair is rough. His right elbow rests on the arm of the chair; his left hand is on his thigh. He wears a dark costume with a broad and close-fitting white lace collar and white wristbands. In the Rijksmuseum catalogue the sitter is identified as Nicolaes Hasselaer (1593-1635); but his wife, Geertruyt van Erp died in 1620, and this portrait, from its style, must have been painted later than that year. [Pendant to 187.] Canvas, 32 inches by 26 1/2 inches. Presented to the Rijksmuseum in 1885 by J. S. R. van de Poll. In the Rijksmuseum, Amsterdam, 1907 catalogue, No. 1089."

Hofstede de Groot lists the portrait's pendant as possibly a portrait of Brechtje van Schooterbosch, the wife of Nicolaes' older brother. The Dirk-Brechtje couple baptized children in 1617 and 1618 and were older than Claes and Sara. Considering Hofstede de Groot's comment that this portrait displays a style later than Claes's marriage date of 1622, then it is clearly a mistake to label it as Dirk's, though Dirk lived longer than Nicolaes and took over his appointments as regent of the Amsterdam city orphanage and captain-major of the civic guard. However, it is possibly the portrait of another member of the extensive Hasselaer family.

== Other portraits of Nicolaes Hasselaer ==
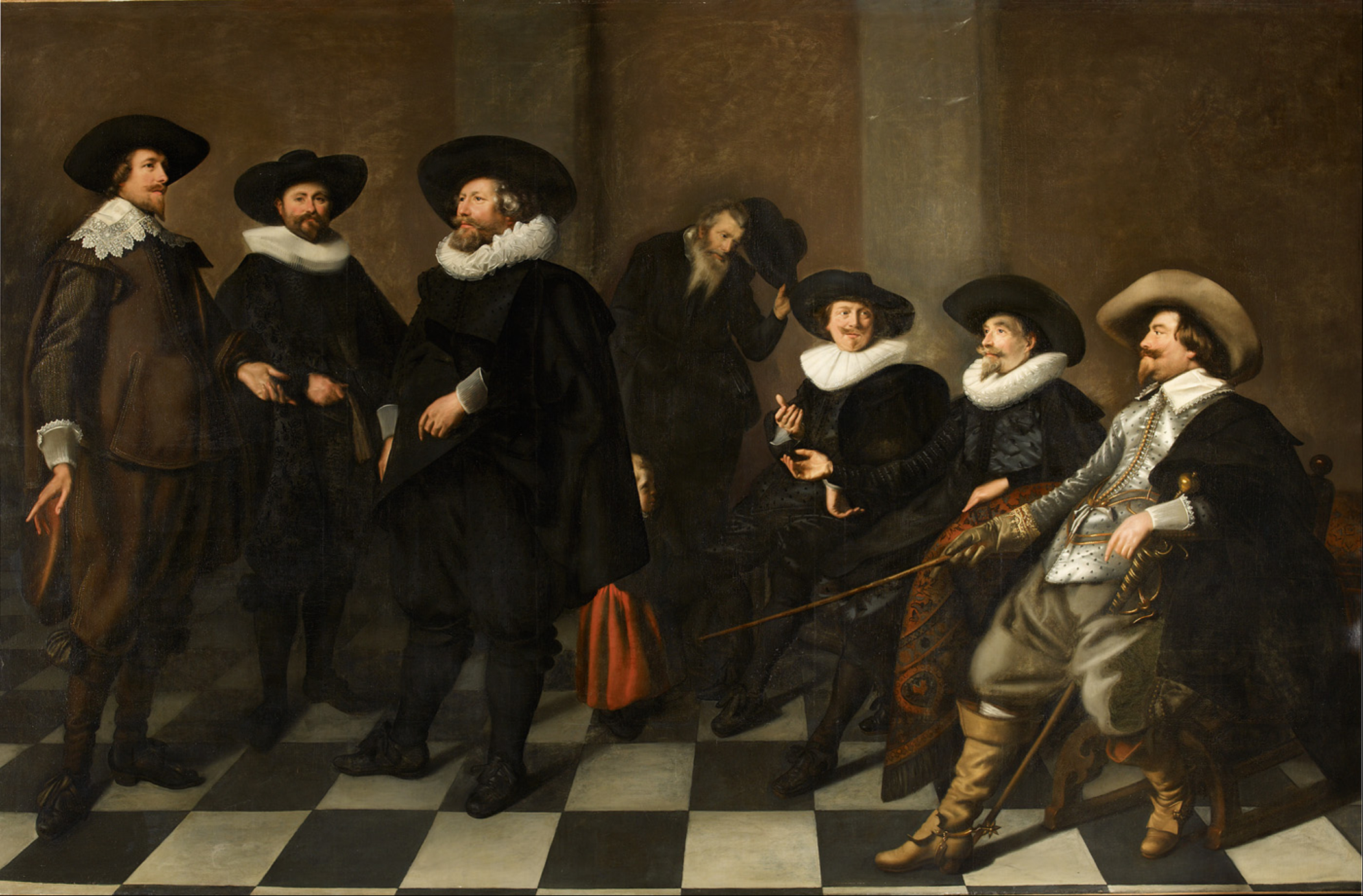
Regents of the city orphanage, 1633, by Abraham de Vries; shows Nicolaes pointing his major's staff at an orphan while leaning over the back of a chair

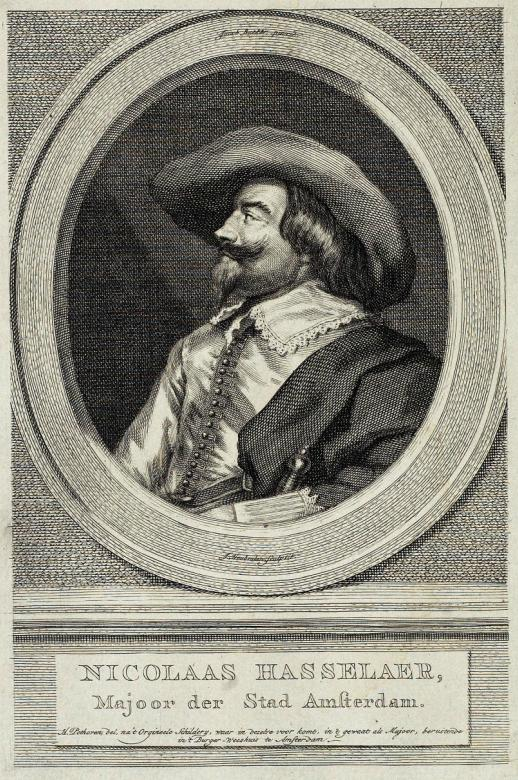
Engraving by Jacob Houbraken after the Orphanage portrait
