= Pieter Hasselaer =

Amsterdam brewer

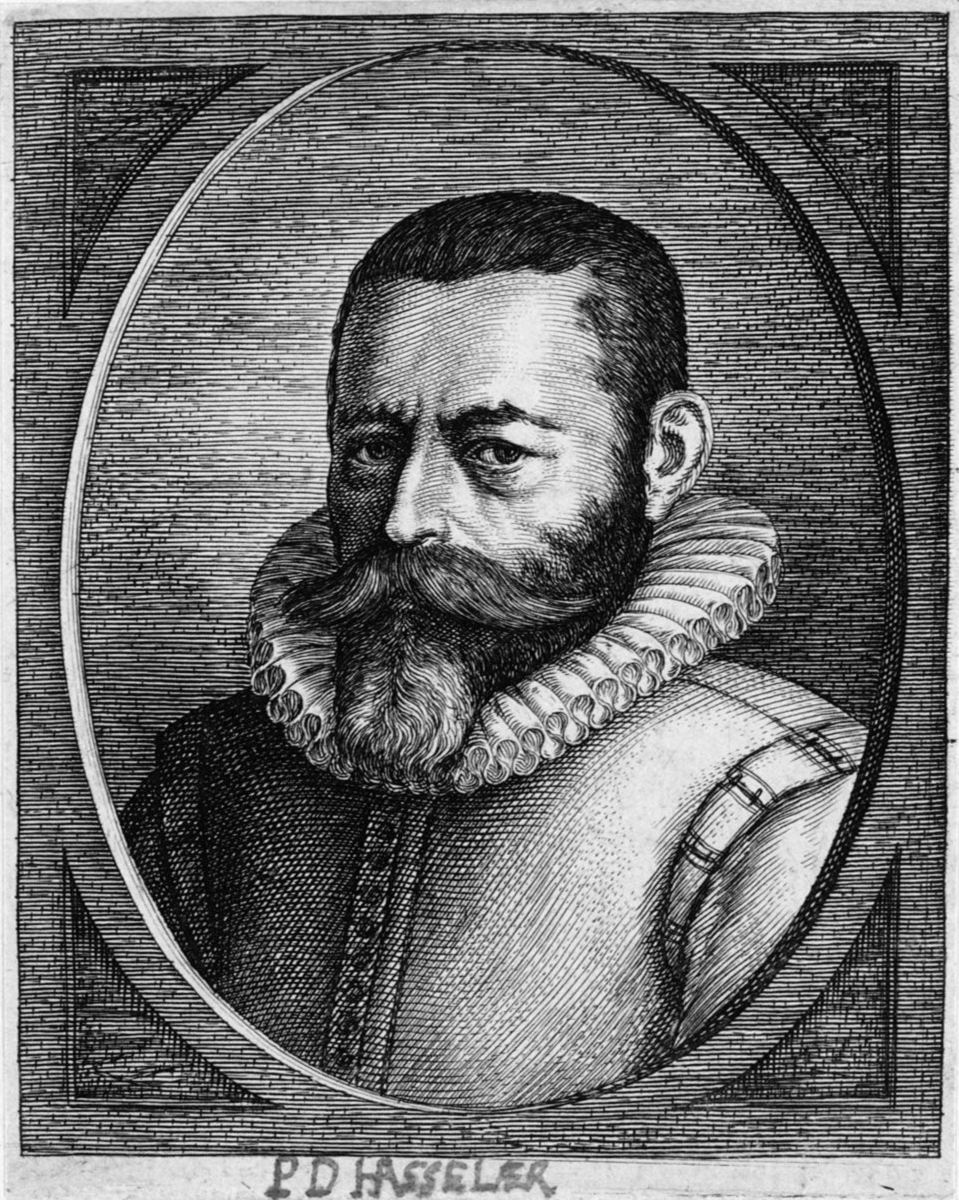
Pieter Dirksz. Hasselaer (1554 - 27-08-1616)

Pieter Dircksz. Hasselaar (Haarlem, 1554–Amsterdam, August 1616) was an Amsterdam brewer and schepen (alderman), and one of the founders of the Dutch East India Company. He is famous, along with his aunt Kenau Simonsdochter Hasselaer, for courageous actions during the siege of Haarlem in 1573. In 1578, after the Alteratie, he moved to Amsterdam and by 1583 was manager of the brewery of Andries Boelens. In 1587 he bought a brewery, the Eagle, between Nieuwendijk and Prins Hendrikkade.

He also acted as a merchant in Portugal and Spain. In 1594 he joined the Amsterdam city council and was one of the governors of the Compagnie van Verre. In 1597, he started the Company of Guinea. He bought maps, books and stationery for Willem Barents, who would sail to Nova Zembla. In 1602 he was one of the investors in the Dutch East India Company. In 1608 he traded on the White Sea and Archangel. He owned land in Heerhugowaard and Texel. In 1611 he started a brewery Witte Arent on the Lastage. The brewery went over to his son Nicolaes, and after he died, to his daughter Balichgen and son-in-law Peter Everstz Hulst, known for his portrait in 1639 by Bartholomeus van der Helst.

His son Pieter Pietersz Hasselaer (1582–1651) was mayor eight times between 1635 and 1649, son Dirck succeeded him at the East India Company, and his son Nicolaes was captain-major of the civic guard. Together with Albert Burgh, Andries Bicker and Abraham Boom, Hasselaer received Marie de Medici.
