= Dirck van Os =

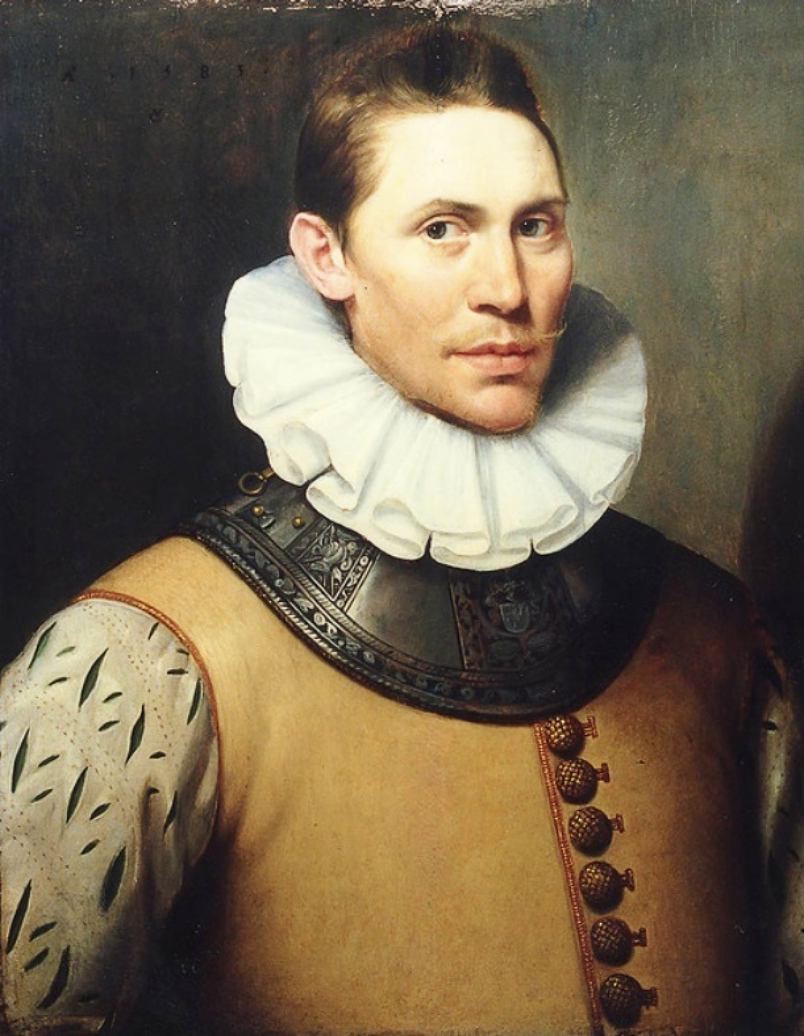
Portrait of Dirck van Os, on display at Stedelijk Museum Alkmaar

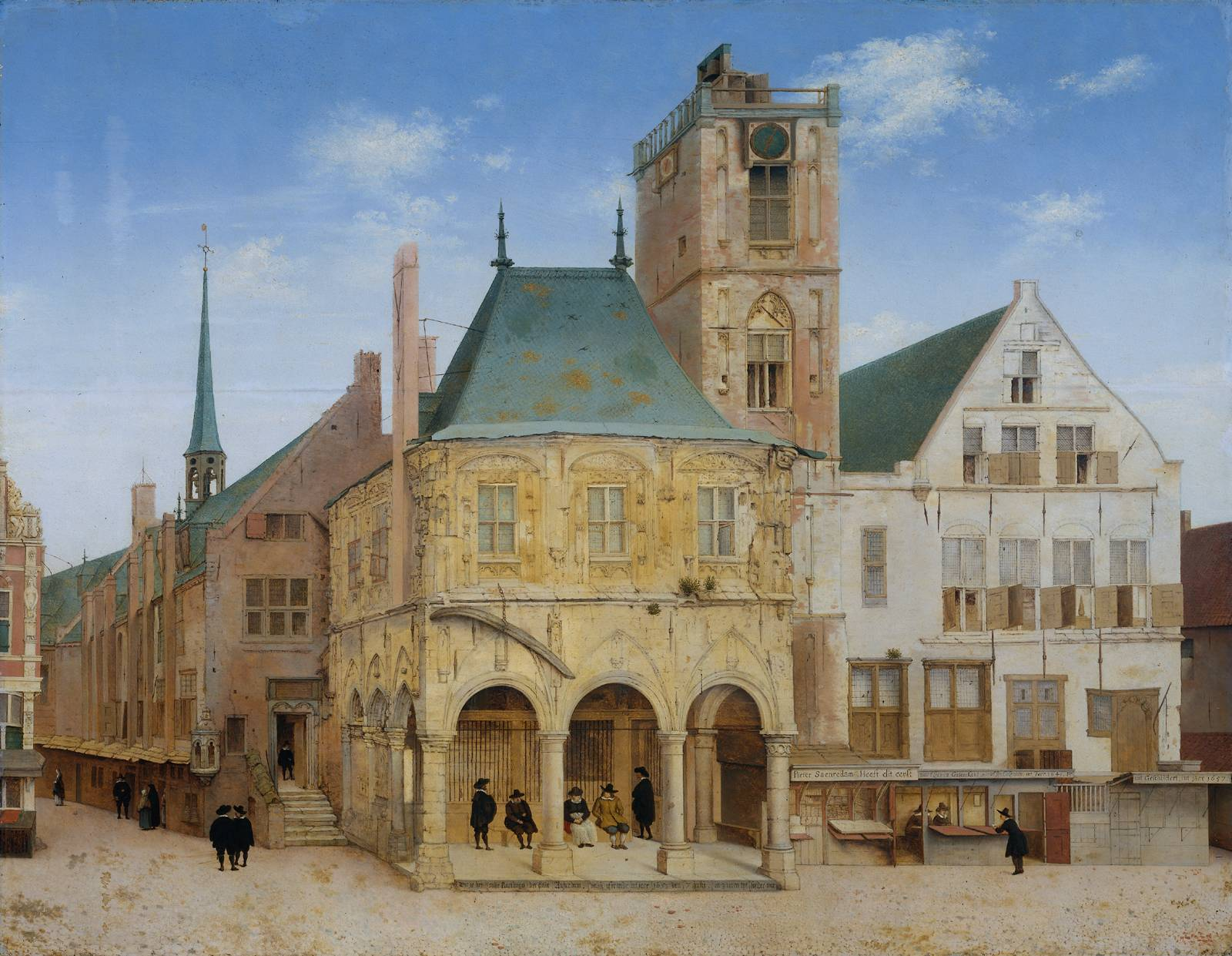
A painting by Pieter Saenredam of the old town hall in Amsterdam where Amsterdam Exchange Bank was founded in 1609

Dirck van Os (March 1556 – May 1615) was an Amsterdam merchant, insurer, financier and shipping magnate. He is among the founders of the Compagnie van Verre, the United East India Company (VOC), and the Amsterdam Exchange Bank.

== Biography ==
Van Os was born in Antwerp to a trader in pigments and tapestries, originally from 's-Hertogenbosch, who had moved to Antwerp around 1550.

Dirck served as captain of militia in the Fall of Antwerp, wherein the city surrendered to the Duke of Parma. After this point he moved to Middelburg. In January 1588, Van Os married Margretha van de Piet. He and his brother Hendrick traded in leather, grain and precious stones, primarily in the Levant and cities on the Baltic Sea. In 1595, he organized an expedition with Isaac le Maire to get salt in Setúbal and ship it to Arkhangelsk.

In 1602 he was one of the founders of the Dutch East India Company, and served as one of the first directors. (The brothers hired a bookkeeper who moved in.) With 47,000 guilders, they were the largest investors. This number grew to 120,000 by 1609. The oldest stock share in the world, dated 27 September 1606, was also signed by him.

The company had an account at the Wisselbank from the beginning. At that time they were involved in the expedition of Henry Hudson to find an alternative route to the East. In 1612 Van Os acquired more than one-seventh of the land in Beemster and in the Purmer

His portrait is in the Stedelijk Museum Alkmaar.

== Family ==
His son, Dirck van Os II (1590–1668), served from 1618 to 1666 as the dijkgraaf of Beemster, and was the subject of a Rembrandt portrait currently owned by Joslyn Art Museum in Omaha, Nebraska.
