= Portrait of Sara Wolphaerts van Diemen =

Painting by Frans Hals

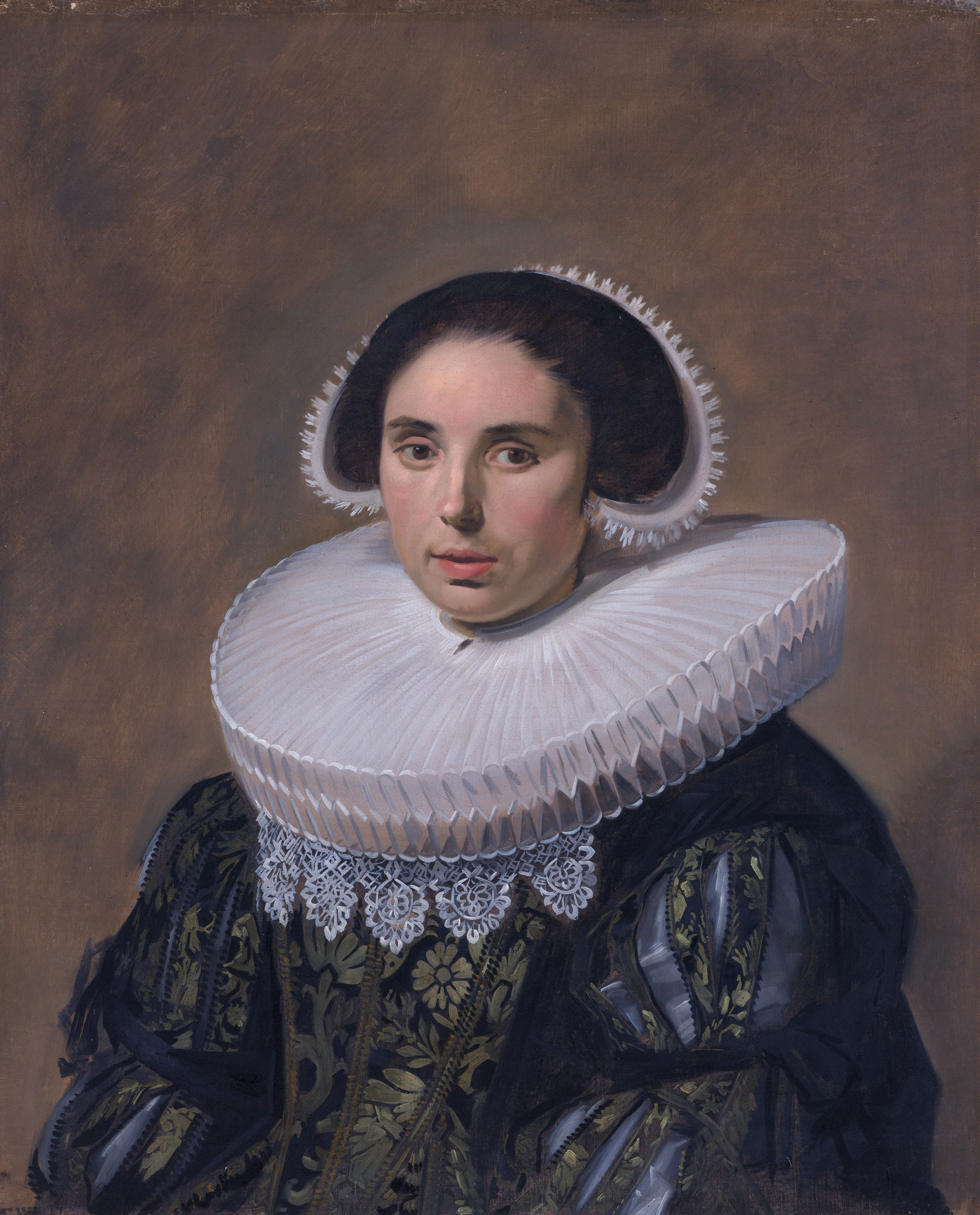
- Portrait of Sara Wolphaerts van Diemen (1594–1667), second wife of Nicolaes Hasselaer, 1630–1633, oil on canvas, 79.5 cm x 66.5 cm
- Artist: Frans Hals
- Year: c. 1630–1633
- Catalogue: Hofstede de Groot, Catalog 1910: #187
- Medium: Oil on canvas
- Dimensions: 79.5 cm × 66.5 cm (31.3 in × 26.2 in)
- Location: Rijksmuseum; Amsterdam
- Accession: SK-A-1247

Portrait of Sara Wolphaerts van Diemen is an oil-on-canvas painting by the Dutch Golden Age painter Frans Hals, painted around 1630–1633 and now in the Rijksmuseum, in Amsterdam. It is considered a pendant to the portrait of Sara's husband Nicolaes Hasselaer.

== Life ==
Sara Wolphaerts van Diemen was baptized in Amsterdam on 6 April 1593 as the daughter of Gerrit Wolphaerts van Diemen and Anna Fabry. Her parents had 9 children and Sara had several brothers and sisters who married into the Amsterdam regency, such as Christina who married Nicolas Balestel, and Anna who married Albert Coenraetsz Burgh. Anna's daughter later married the mayor Nicolaes Tulp. Sara became engaged to the wealthy widower Nicolaes Hasselaer, who lived on the Keizersgracht, on 14 August 1622. He had first married Geertruyt van Erp (1596-1620) and had a son Gerrit by her. She probably died in childbirth. Sara raised Gerrit to be a mayor of Amsterdam and she also had three daughters, of whom Anna married Marten Ruychaver van Loon and later Pieter van Dam, and Geertruid married Cornelis van Werckhoven. Sara outlived her husband by 35 years and died in Amsterdam on 1 May 1667.

== Hals portrait ==
Sara's portrait was probably painted on the occasion of her marriage to Claes in 1622, aged 29. Similar to Hals' other wedding portraits of women, she is wearing a richly embroidered stomacher. Her dress is the height of fashion and shows a moment when flat collars and wide millstone collars were worn together. She wears her hair rolled in front of a winged diadem cap that is edged with lace trim. Her portrait doesn't seem to match up as well to its pendant as other Hals's wedding pendants, and it is possible that the portrait of Nicolaes was painted on the occasion of his first marriage. Her portrait was documented by Hofstede de Groot in 1910, who wrote:

187. BRECHTJE VAN SCHOOTERBOSCH (probably), wife of Dirk Pietersz Hasselaer. M. 43. Half-length. She is seen almost in full face, but slightly inclined to the left. She looks at the spectator. She wears a lace cap and a very broad ruff on a very rich dress. The hands are not shown. The picture seems to be unfinished. In the Rijksmuseum catalogue the sitter is identified as Geertruyt van Erp (1596–1620). If this is correct the date of her death must be wrongly given. [See 186, of which this is the pendant.] Canvas, 32 inches by 26 1/2 inches. Presented to the Rijksmuseum in 1885 by J. S. R. van de Poll. In the Rijksmuseum, Amsterdam, 1907 catalogue, No. 1090.

Hofstede de Groot correctly rejected it as a portrait of Nicolaes's first wife, but he went even further and stated that Nicolaes' portrait was actually of his older brother Dirk, thus labelling this one the name of Dirk's wife Brechtje.

In 1974 Seymour Slive listed these as pendants and remarked on Nicolaes' unusual relaxed pose leaning over the back of a chair, and that Sara's headress was similar to that of women in the 1630s, including others by Hals.

== Wedding pendant ==
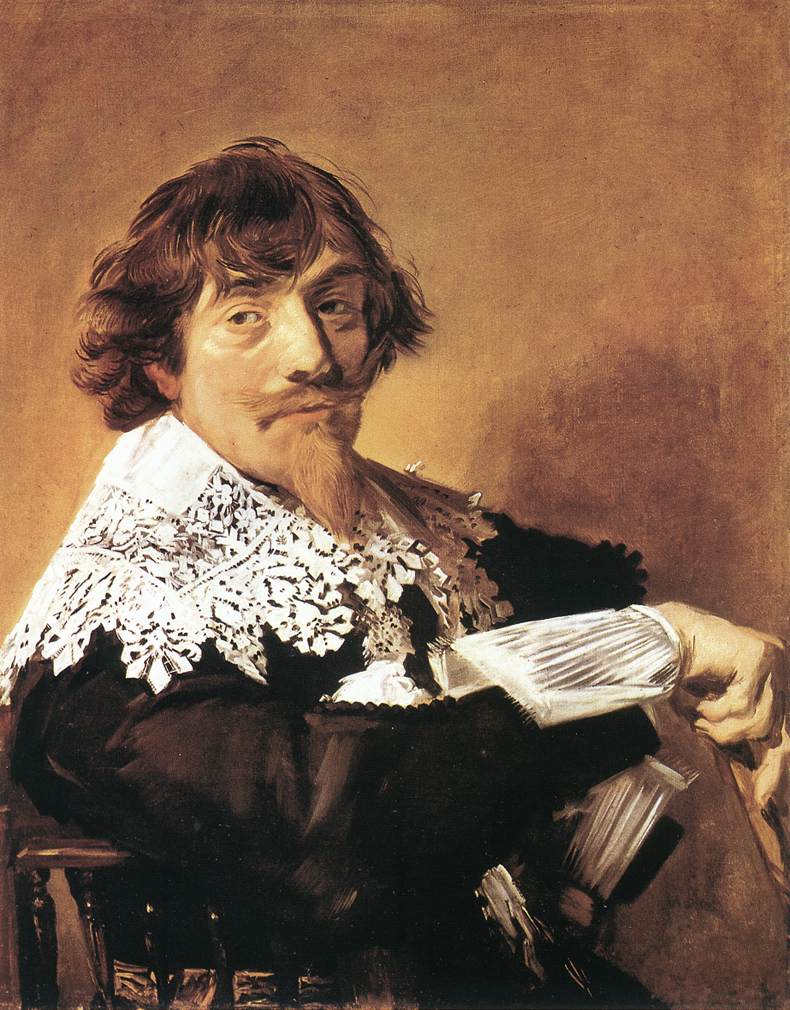

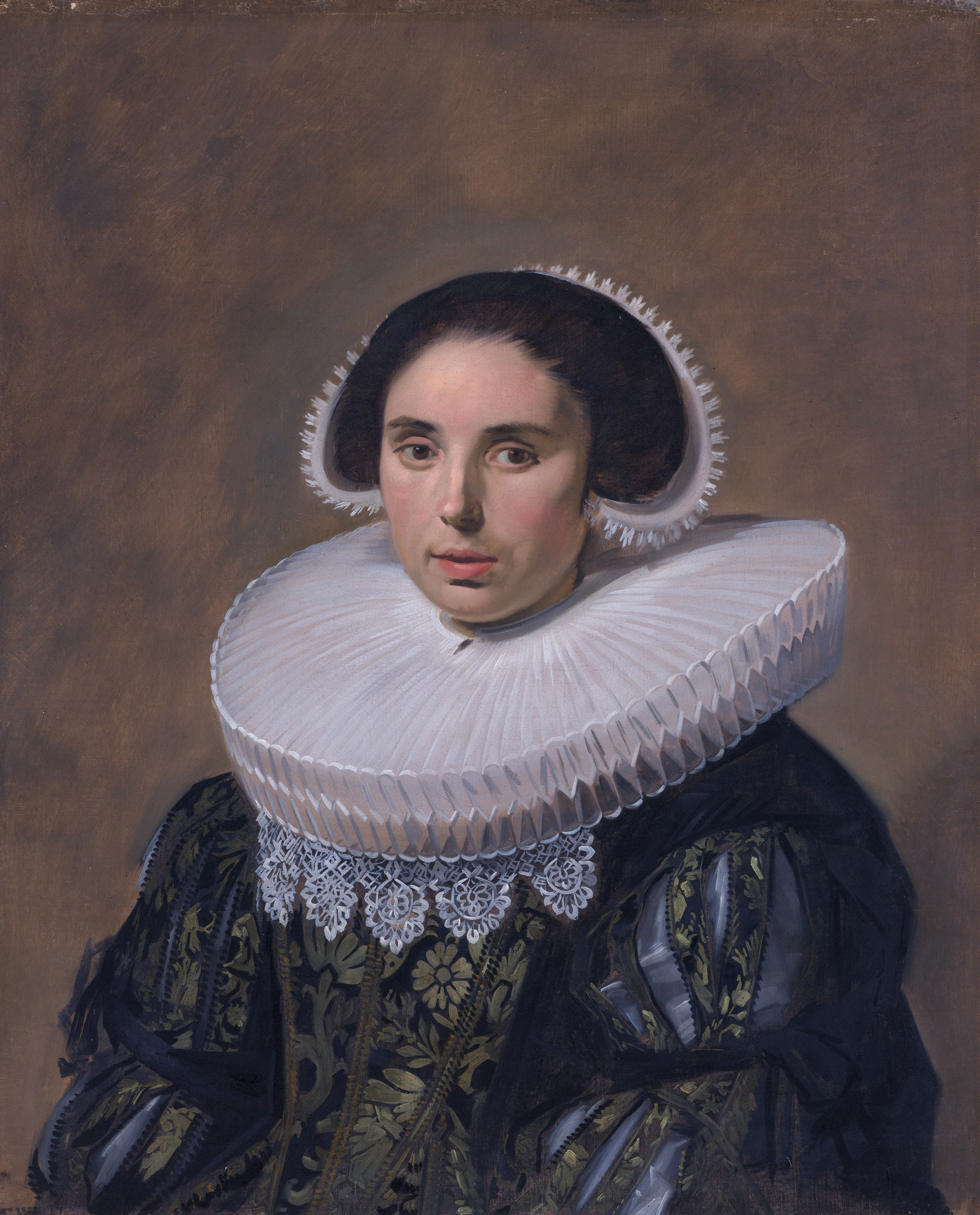

== Similar lace caps by Hals ==
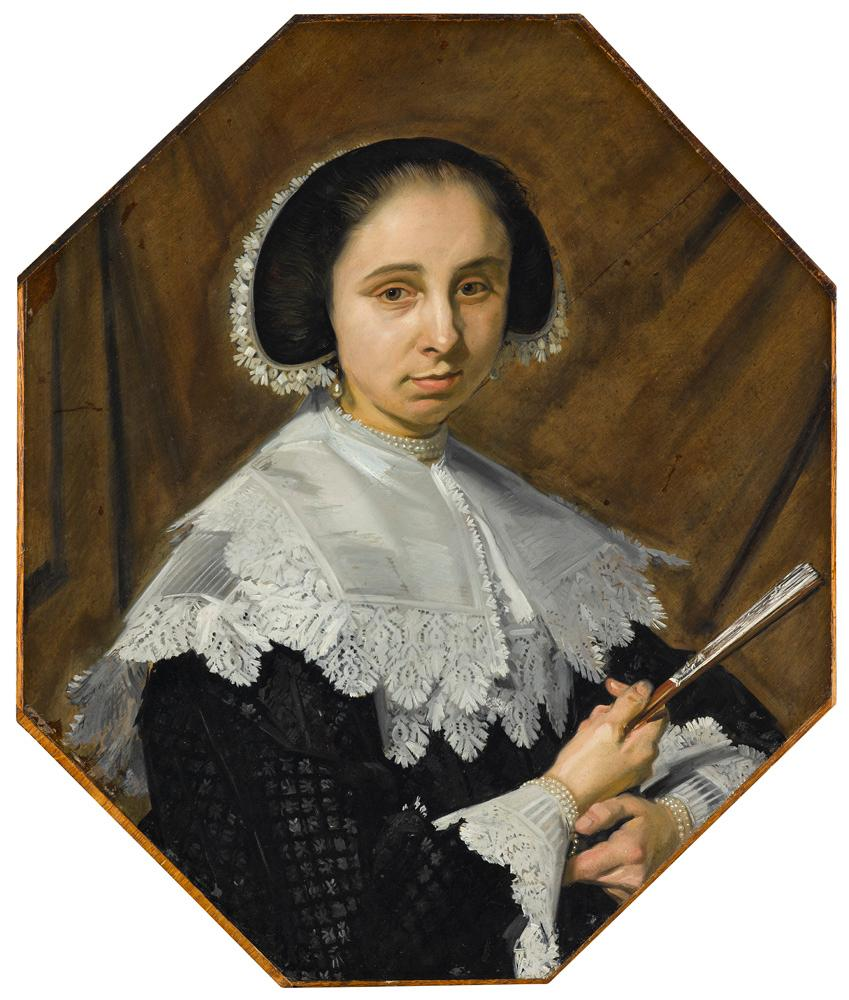

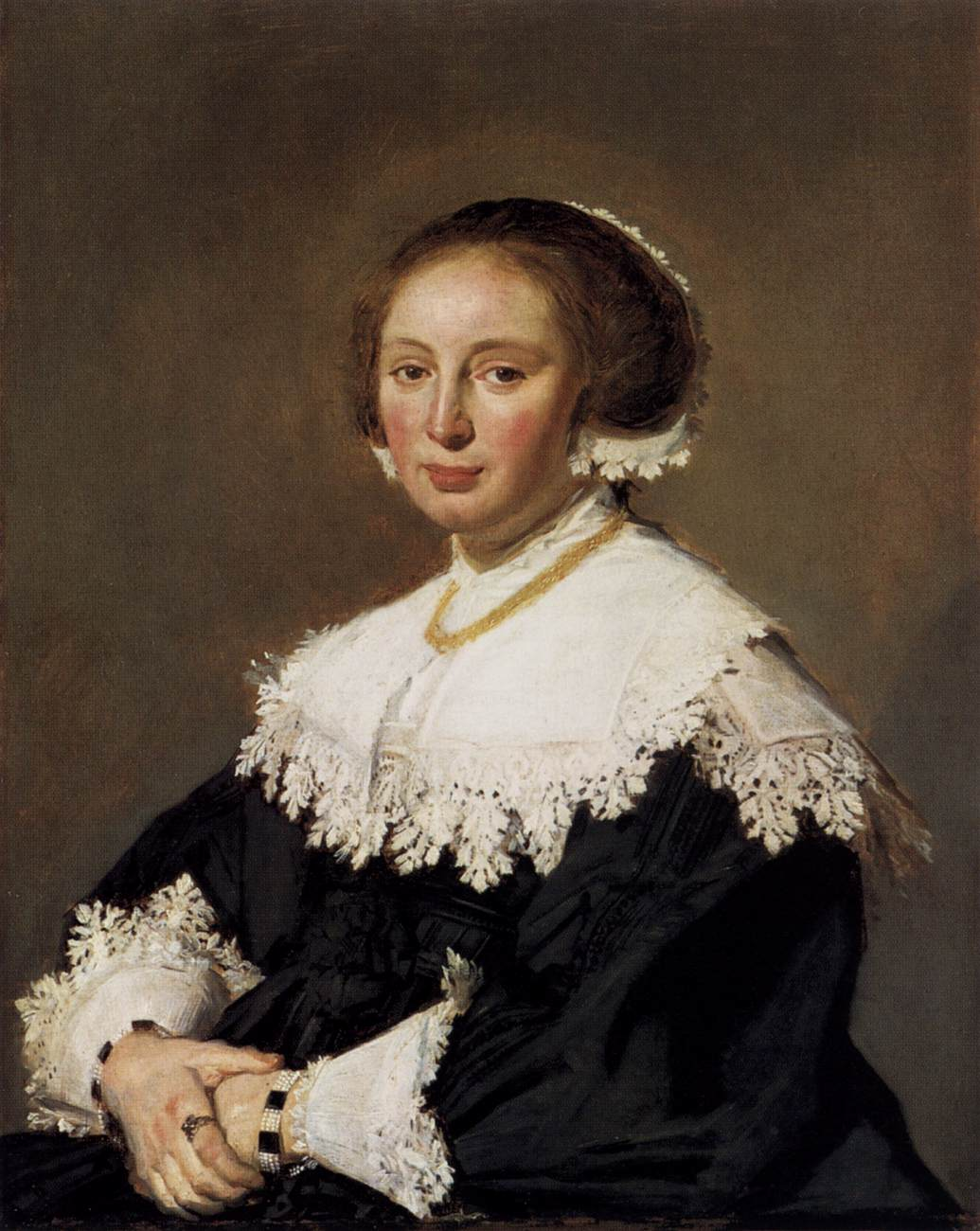

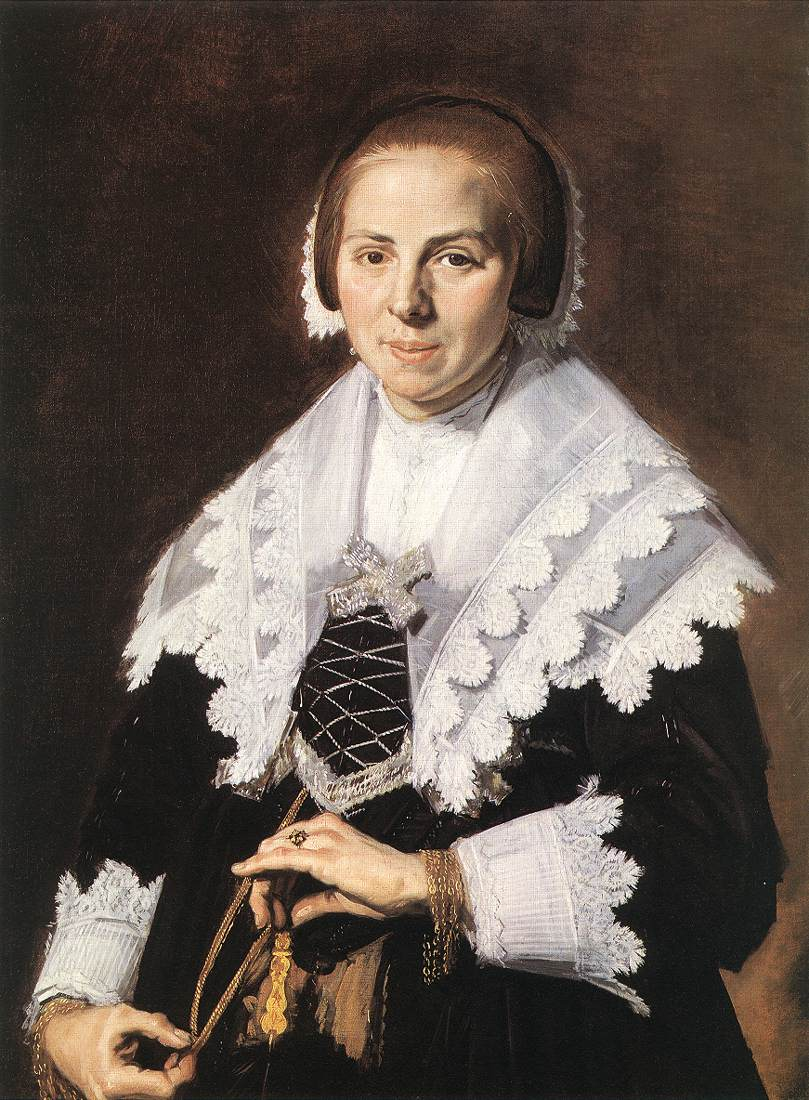

== See also ==
- List of paintings by Frans Hals
