= Compagnie van Verre =

Forerunner of Dutch East India Company

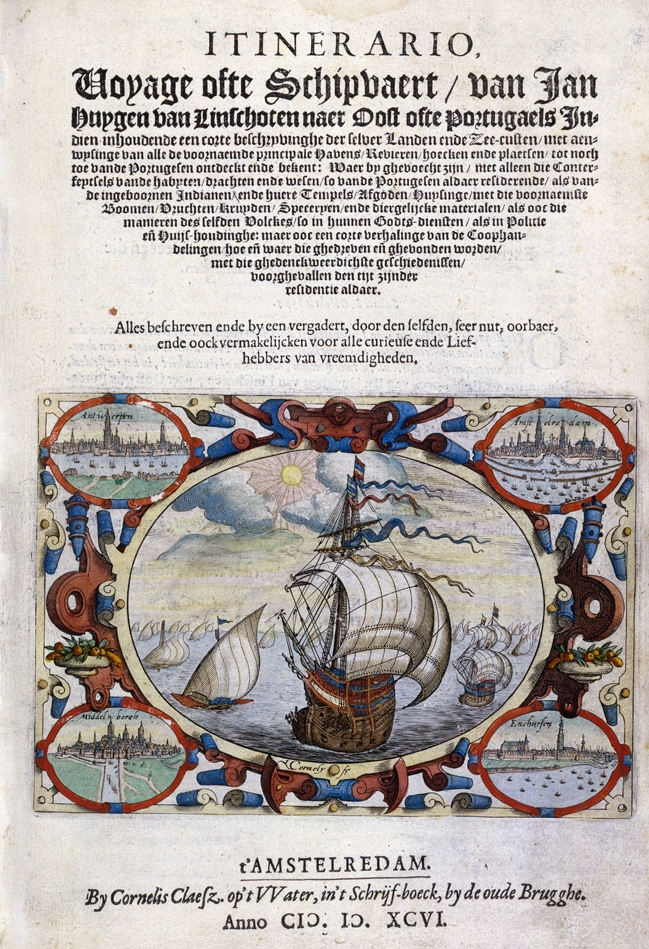
Itinerario, voyage ofte schipvaert, naer Oost ofte Portugaels Indien inhoudende een corte beschryvinghe der selver landen ende zee-custen met daarin ook de Beschryvinghe van de gantsche custe van Guinea en het Reys-gheschrift vande navigatien der Portugaloysers in Orienten.

The Compagnie van Verre (lit. 'long-distance company') was one of the forerunner companies that were later merged (united) into the Dutch East India Company.

== History ==
It was set up in 1594 by nine citizens of Amsterdam, to break Portugal's monopoly on the pepper trade. To do this, it sent an expedition of three heavily armed ships and a pinnace under the leadership of Cornelis de Houtman, with orders to break into the trade. (Cornelis' brother Frederik also worked for the company.)

On 2 April 1595 the ships set off from Texel, with 248 officers and men on board. The expedition (which became known as the Eerste schipvaart) followed the routes described by Jan Huygen van Linschoten after he had made the journey in the pay of the Portuguese. On 6 June 1596 the ships arrived at Bantam, the most important pepper port on Java. During the return trip, on 11 January 1597, Amsterdam was badly damaged and had to be left behind at the island of Bawean.

On 14 August 1597 the expedition arrived back in Amsterdam with only 87 survivors. The voyage was not a success commercially, but it proved that not only the Portuguese had the potential to trade in pepper.

In 1598 the Compagnie van Verre merged with the Nieuwe Compagnie and in 1597 with the Oude Compagnie. The resulting company then merged with the Nieuwe Brabantsche Compagnie in 1601 to form the Verenigde Amsterdamse Compagnie, which in turn merged with many other companies (including the Verenigde Zeeuwse Compagnie) in 1602 into the Dutch East India Company (VOC), retaining a room in the VOC's chambers in Amsterdam.

== General references ==
- Durand, Frédéric (1993). "Trois siècles dans l'île du teck. Les politiques forestières aux Indes néerlandaises (1602-1942)". Publications de la Société française d'histoire des outre-mers. 13 (1): 251–305.
- "Inventaris van de archieven van de Compagnieën op Oost-Indië, 1594-1603 Compagnieën op Oost-Indië". Nationaal Archief. 's-Gravenhage. Archived from the original on 7 April 2014.
- Dillen, J.G. van (1958). Het oudste aandeelhoudersregister van de Kamer Amsterdam der Oost-Indische Compagnie. LCCN 59042814. OCLC 7472505. OL 5784423M.
