= Ar-Raniry State Islamic University =

University in Banda Aceh, Aceh, Indonesia

Ar-Raniry State Islamic University Banda Aceh
- Universitas Islam Negeri Ar-Raniry Banda Aceh
- Motto: A bridge for your future career and spirituality
- Type: State University
- Established: 1960 as IAIN Ar raniry (state islamic institute/institut agama islam negri)
- Affiliations: Islam
- Rector: H. Warul Walidin AK
- Academic staff: ± 1.100
- Students: ± 25.000 students
- Undergraduates: 26.000
- Postgraduates: 1.220
- Doctoral students: 150
- Other students: 2700 D2 GPAI (teacher islamic studies) and PGMI
- Location: Banda Aceh, Aceh, Indonesia; 5°34′44″N 95°22′03″E
- Campus: Syeikh Abdul Rauf, Syiah Kuala, Banda Aceh
- Colours: Blue
- Website: ar-raniry.ac.id

Ar-Raniry State Islamic University Banda Aceh (Bahasa Indonesia: Universitas Islam Negeri Ar-Raniry Banda Aceh or it is simply called UIN Ar-Raniry (UINAR), is a public Islamic university in Banda Aceh, Aceh Province, Indonesia, named after Nur al-Din al-Raniri, Islamic mystic and scholar who served in the court of the sultan of Aceh. The University is run under the auspices of the Ministry of Religious Affairs of the Republic of Indonesia.

== Campus ==
The campus on Syeikh Abdul Rauf Street in Banda Aceh Aceh Darussalam (the main campus) consists of the Rectorate Building, Main Library, administrative offices, main auditorium, the guest house, the Student Center, Center for Integrated Laboratory, Bank Mandiri, BNI Bank, BRI Bank, and nine faculty buildings.

== History ==
The birth of IAIN Ar-Raniry was preceded by the establishment of the Faculty of Shari'ah in 1960 and the Faculty of Tarbiyah in 1962 as a branch of IAIN Sunan Kalidjaga Yogyakarta. In addition, in the same year (1962), Ushuluddin Faculty was also established as a private faculty in Banda Aceh. After a few years as a branch of IAIN Yogyakarta, the faculties sprang to IAIN Syarif Hidayatullah Jakarta for six months until IAIN Ar-Raniry was inaugurated. At the time of inauguration on October 5, 1963, with the issuance of Decree of the Minister of Religious Affairs of the Republic of Indonesia No. 89 of 1963.

As the third IAIN in the archipelago after IAIN Sunan Kalidjaga Yogyakarta and IAIN Syarif Hidayatullah Jakarta, IAIN Ar-Raniry continues to advance and develop. When IAIN Ar-Raniry was inaugurated (October 5, 1963) it has only three faculties, namely Faculty of Shari'ah, Faculty of Tarbiyah and Ushuluddin Faculty, but only 5 years old was inaugurated also Faculty of Da'wah (1968) as the faculty of Da'wah in the IAIN neighborhood in Indonesia. In 1968, IAIN Ar-Raniry was appointed as the parent of two state-run religious faculties in Medan (the forerunner of IAIN North Sumatra), the Faculty of Tarbiyah and Syari'ah which lasted for 5 years.

To match with other IAIN-IAIN, in 1983, the Adab Faculty officially became one of the 5 faculties in the IAIN Ar-Raniry neighborhood.

IAIN is an abbreviation of the State Islamic Institute and the Ar-Raniry word attributed to IAIN Banda Aceh is the name of a great Ulama and mufti who was very influential on the time of Sultan Iskandar Tsani (reigned in 1637-1641). The great scholar is the full name of Sheikh Nur al-Din Ar-Raniry from Ranir (now Rander) in Gujarat, India. He has made strong contributions to the development of Islamic thought in Southeast Asia, especially in Aceh.

=== Founding period ===
The long wait of IAIN Ar Raniry Banda Aceh to become State Islamic University (UIN) materialized. The status of the campus which is located in Kopelma Darussalam was officially increased after the publication of Presidential Regulation (Perpres) RI Number 64.

"The change of status of IAIN to UIN Ar Raniry is a special gift for Jantong Hate Campus (heart of heart) of Acehnese who is 50 years old, exactly on October 5, 2013," said special staff of IAIN Rector Ar Raniry, Saifullah Isri to Okezone in Banda Aceh, Friday (10/11/2013).

He said the Perpres dated October 1, 2013 on the increase of IAIN status into a UIN signed by President Susilo Bambang Yudhoyono, was received by his side on Thursday, October 10 at the Office of the Cabinet Secretary, Jakarta.

UIN Ar Raniry Aceh is the seventh and youngest UIN in Indonesia, after UIN Sunan Syarif Kasim. As of October 1, 2013, everything related to names, status and assets, whether fixed or mobile, including students, lecturers, and IAIN employees automatically become UIN Ar Raniry's assets.

"Gratitude Alhamdulillah, in the golden year IAIN Ar Raniry managed to carve out an important history in the development of identity, namely the change of status into a university," said Saifullah.

== Faculties and study programs ==
Syarif Hidayatullah State Islamic University Jakarta offers majors and new courses to integrate science, Islamic studies and Indonesian identity. The university has 11 faculties consisting of religious, social science, and science-based faculties.

=== Faculty of Education and Teacher Training (Fakultas Tarbiyah dan Keguruan, FTK) ===
This faculty ftk.ar-raniry.ac.id offers studies in the following departments and study programs: Teaching of Islamic Sciences, Teaching of Arabic Language, Islamic Educational Studies (study programs: Supervision of Islamic Education and Management of Islamic Education), Tadris (study programs: Teaching of English, Teaching of Mathematics, and Teaching of Natural Science), Teaching Diploma II, Diploma III, and Diploma IV.

=== Faculty of Literature and Humanities (Fakultas Adab dan Humaniora, FAH) ===
The Faculty of Literature and Humanities includes the following departments and study programs: Arabic Language and Literature (Sastra dan Bahasa Arab), Islamic History and Civilization (Sejarah dan Peradaban Islam), Translation (Tarjamah), and Library Sciences (Ilmu Kepustakaan).

=== Faculty of Usul al-Din and Philosophy (Fakultas Ushuluddin dan Filsafat, FUF) ===
This faculty has the following departments and study programs: Comparative Religion (Perbandingan Agama), Theology and Philosophy (Aqidah dan Filsafat), and Tafsir of Hadith (Tafsir Hadits).

=== Faculty of Shari'a and Law (Fakultas Syari'ah dan Hukum, FSH) ===
The Faculty of Shari'a has the following departments and study programs: Islamic Personal Law (study programs: Islamic Court and Administration of Personal Law Affairs), Islamic Criminal Law and Legal-Political Science (study programs: Islamic Criminal Law and Legal-Political Science), Comparative Jurisprudence and Law (study programs: Comparative Islamic Jurisprudence, Comparative Laws, and Comparative Jurisprudence and Law - Arabic Class) and Mu'amalat (study programs: Shari'a Banking and Islamic Insurance).

=== Faculty of Da'wa and Communication (Fakultas Da'wah dan Komunikasi, FDK) ===
This faculty has the following departments: Communication and Da'wa (Dakwah dan Komunikasi), Journalistic (Jurnalistik), Islamic Guidance and Counseling (Konseling dan Bimbingan Islam), Management of Da'wa (Manajemen Dakwah), and Islamic Community Development (Pengembangan Masyarakat Islam).

=== Faculty of Psychology (Fakultas Psikologi) ===
This faculty was established to train professionals with the capability to help others overcome psychological problems by using a religious approach.

=== Faculty of Islamic Economics and Business [Fakultas Ekonomi dan Bisnis Islam (FEBI)] ===
This faculty aims to develop economic sciences with Islamic characteristics, i.e., to integrate economic aspects with Islamic teachings to graduate professional scholars with a commitment to Islam. It has four study programs: Diploma of Islamic Banking (Diploma III Perbankan Syariah), Islamic Banking (Perbankan Syariah), Islamic Economics (Ekonomi Syariah), and Economics Science (Ilmu Ekonomi).

=== Faculty of Science and Technology (Fakultas Sains dan Teknologi, FST) ===
This faculty is responsible for developing natural sciences and technology imbued with Islamic values. Until 2018, it has five bachelor study programs: Chemistry (Kimia), Biology (Biologi), Environmental Engineering (Teknik Lingkungan), Architecture (Arsitektur) and Information Engineering (Teknologi Informasi).

=== Faculty of Social and Political Science (Fakultas Ilmu Sosial dan Ilmu Politik, FISIP) ===
This faculty develops the study of international relations, political sciences and sociology. It has three departments: Political Sciences (Ilmu Politik), Sociology (Sosiologi), and International Relations (Hubungan Internasional).

=== Post Graduate School ===
The university offers graduate degrees at master and doctorate levels, including the program of "doctor by research".

== Student organizations ==
=== University Level ===
- KMU: Kongres Mahasiswa Universitas
- SEMA: SENAT Mahasiswa Universitas
- DEMA: DEWAN Eksekutif Mahasiswa
- UKM: Unit Kegiatan Mahasiswa
  - LDK (Lembaga Dakwah Kampus)
  - PRAMUKA
  - MENWA (Resimen Mahasiswa)
  - KSR-PMI (Korps Suka Rela - Palang Merah Indonesia)

=== Faculty level ===
- SEMAF: SENAT Perwakilan Mahasiswa Fakultas
- DEMA: DEWAN Eksekutif Mahasiswa Fakultas

=== Program study level ===
- DPMJ: Dewan Perwakilan Mahasiswa Jurusan/Program Studi
- BEMJ: Badan Eksekutif Mahasiswa Jurusan/Program Studi

=== foreign student(mahasiswa asing) ===
- PKPMI-CA(Persatuan kebangsaan pelajar Malaysia di indonesia cabang aceh)

=== Structural institutions ===
These are work units, for example, the existence of which are explicitly expressed in the structure of UIN organization. Such units are as follows:

- Research Center
- Social Service Center
- Computer Center
- Main Library
