= 2024 Banda Aceh mayoral election =

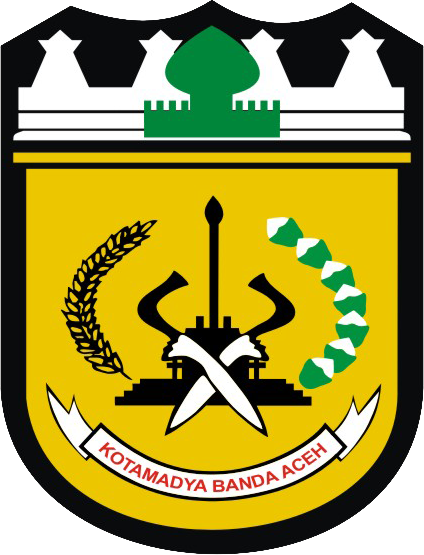
- 27 November 2024
- Turnout: 64.58%
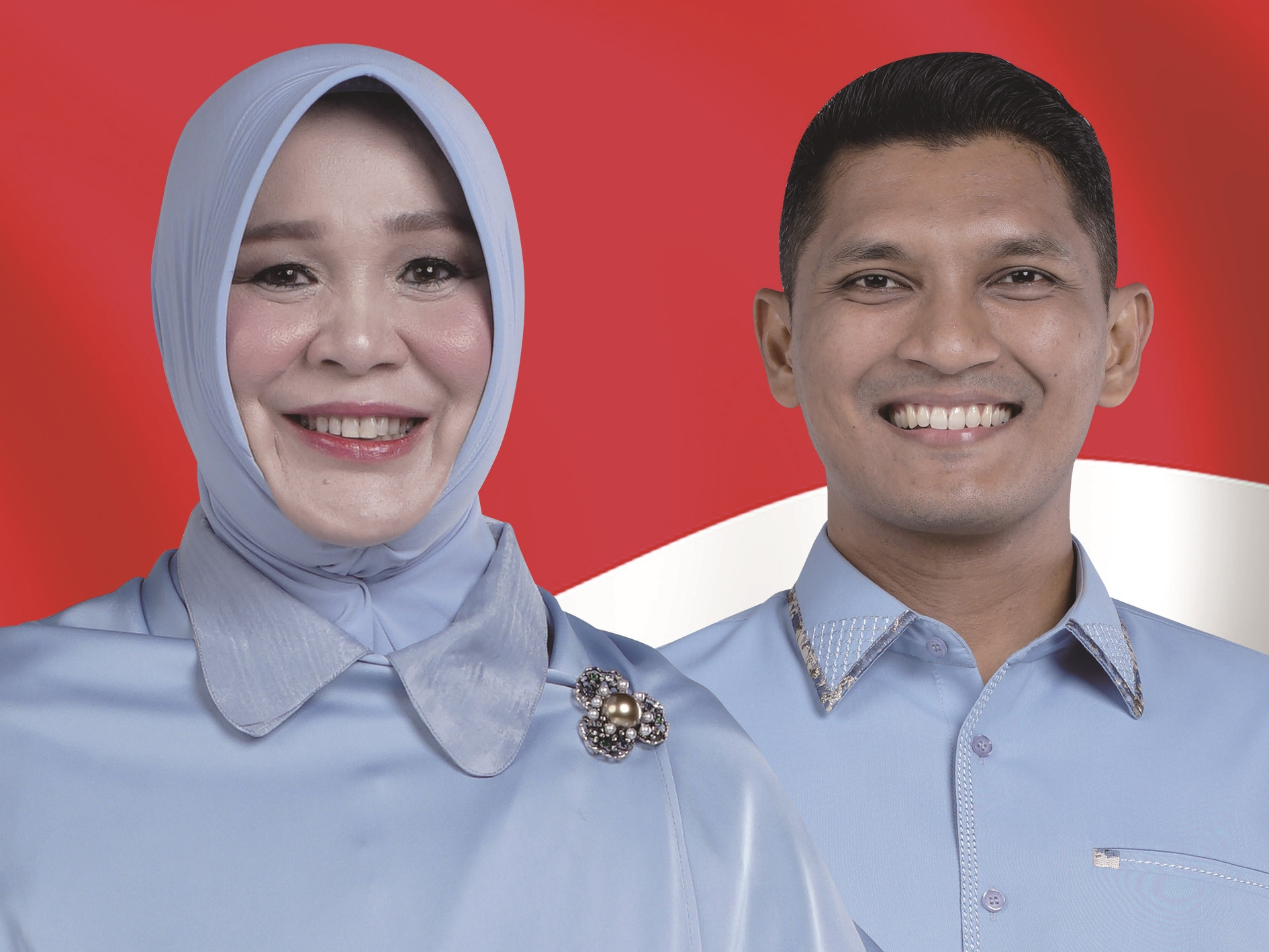

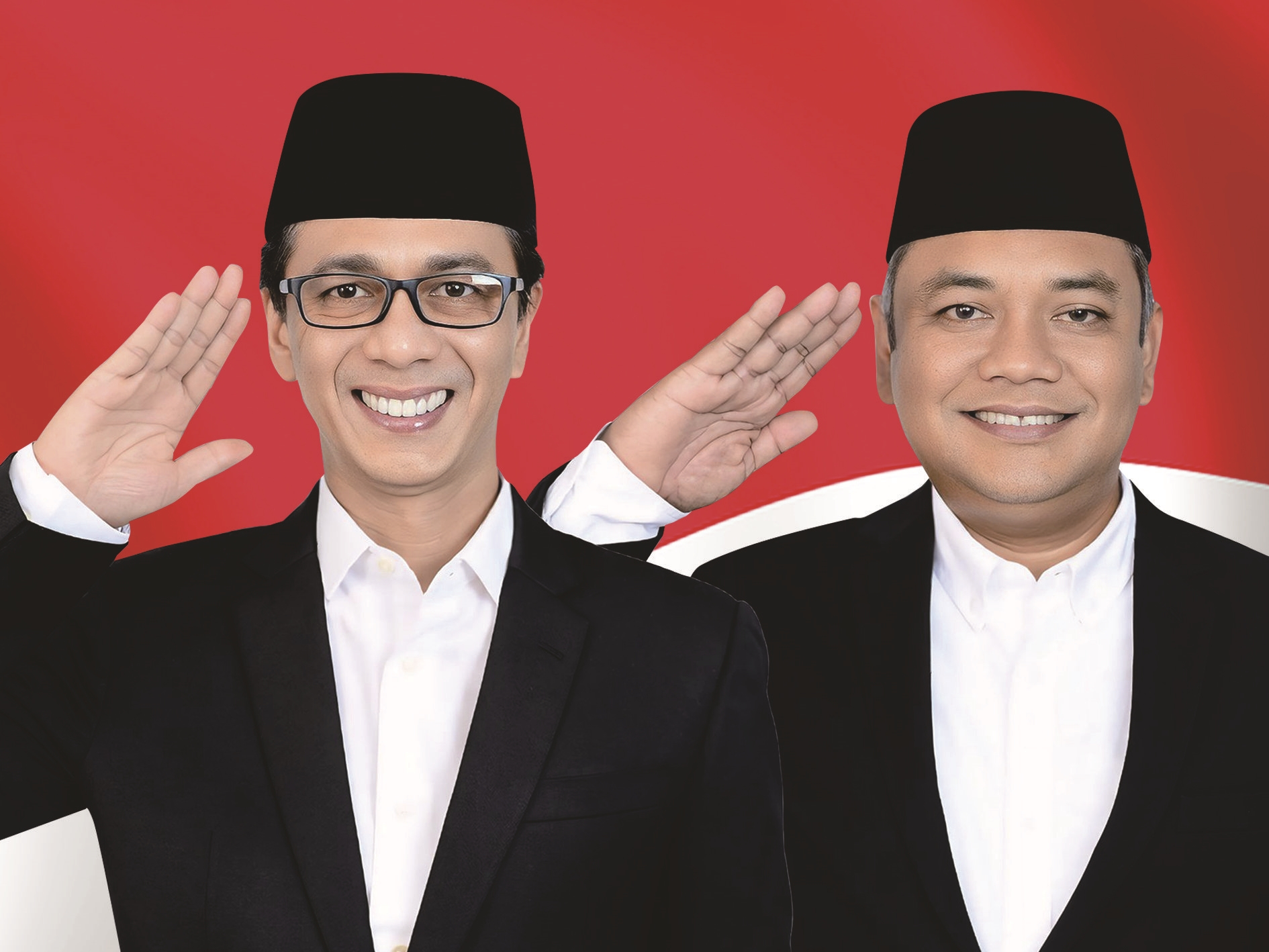

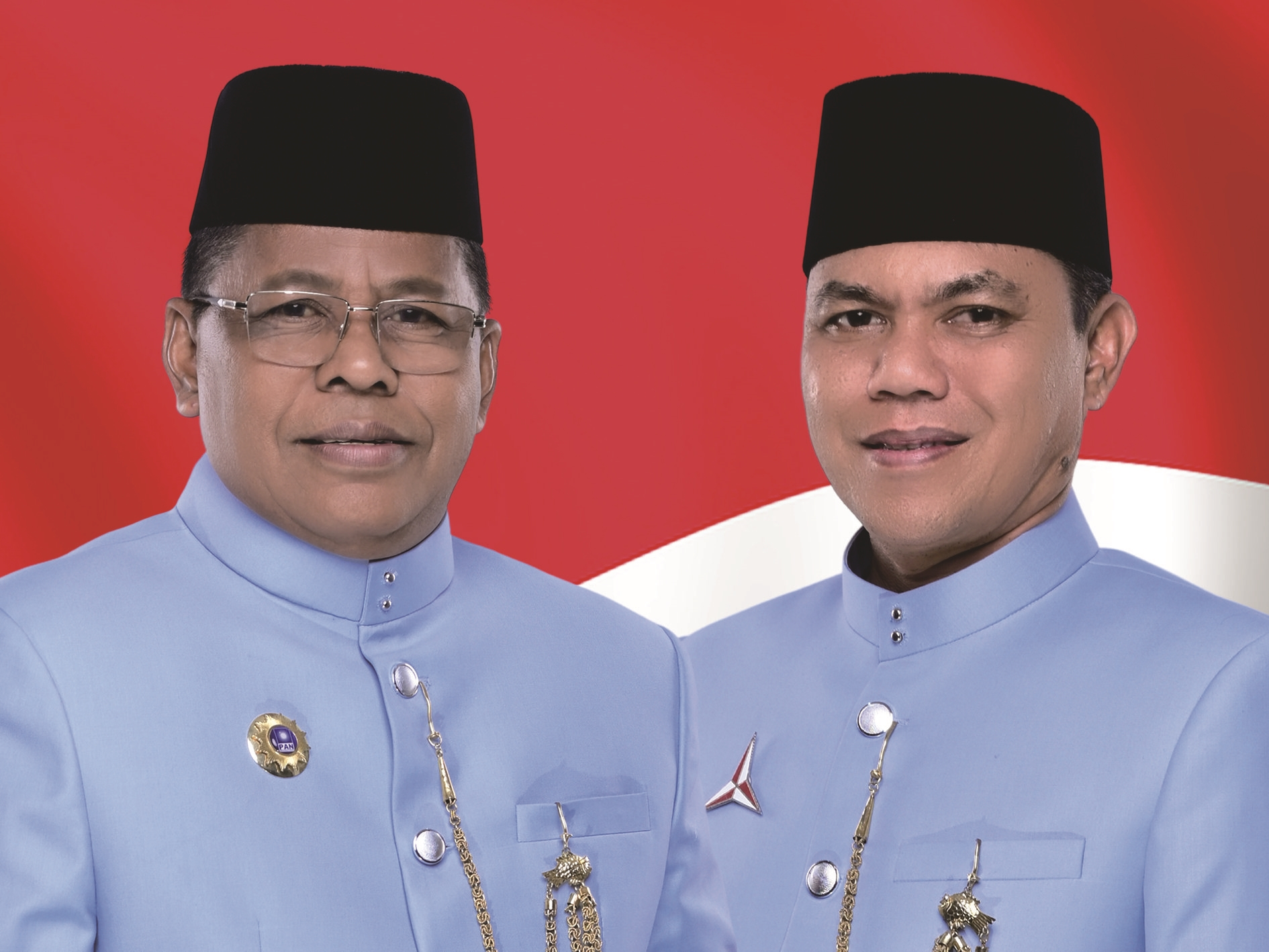

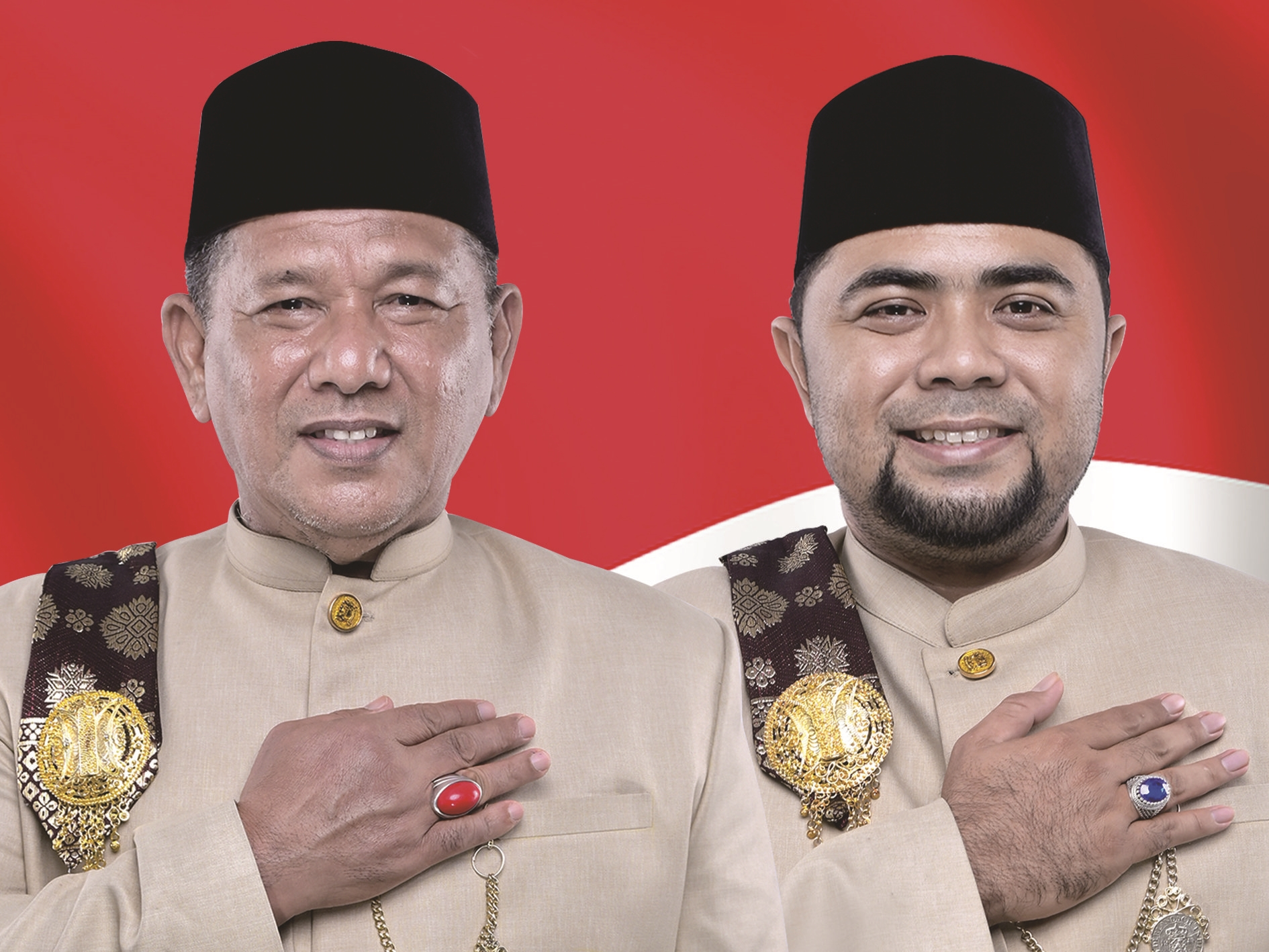
Candidate	Illiza Sa'aduddin Djamal	Teuku Irwan Djohan
Party	PPP	NasDem
Running mate	Afdhal Khalilullah	Khairul Amal
Popular vote	44,982	29,946
Percentage	41.24%	27.45%
Nominee	Aminullah Usman	Zainal Arifin
Party	PAN	Independent
Running mate	Isnaini Husda	Mulia Rahman
Popular vote	25,191	8,956
Percentage	23.10%	8.21%
Mayor before election
Almuniza Kamal (acting)
Independent
Elected mayor
Illiza Sa'aduddin Djamal
PPP

The 2024 Banda Aceh mayoral election was held on 27 November 2024 as part of nationwide local elections to elect the mayor and vice mayor of Banda Aceh for a five-year term. The previous election was held in 2017. Illiza Sa'aduddin Djamal of the United Development Party (PPP), who served as mayor from 2014 to 2017, won the election, receiving 41.24% of the vote and defeating the previous mayor who had beaten her in the 2017 election, Aminullah Usman. She thus secured her second term in office and became the first woman to be democratically elected as mayor in Aceh Province.

== Electoral system ==
The election, like other local elections in 2024, follow the first-past-the-post system where the candidate with the most votes wins the election, even if they do not win a majority. It is possible for a candidate to run uncontested, in which case the candidate is still required to win a majority of votes "against" an "empty box" option. Should the candidate fail to do so, the election will be repeated on a later date.

== Candidates ==
According to electoral regulations, in order to qualify for the election, candidates were required to secure support from a political party or a coalition of parties controlling 10% percent of the valid votes during the last mayoral election.

Illiza Sa'aduddin Djamal ran for her second term. Illiza was Banda Aceh's Deputy Mayor from 2007 to 2014 under Mayor Mawardy Nurdin. Following Mawardy's death, Illiza assumed the mayoralty from 2014 to 2017. However, she failed to win reelection in 2017, losing to Aminullah Usman.

== Results ==
Candidate	Running mate	Party	Votes	%
Illiza Sa'aduddin Djamal	Afdhal Khalilullah	PPP	44,982	41.24
Zainal Arifin	Mulia Rahman	Independent	8,956	8.21
Aminullah Usman	Isnaini Husda	PAN	25,191	23.10
Teuku Irwan Djohan	Khairul Amal	NasDem	29,946	27.45
Total			109,075	100.00
Valid votes			109,075	97.85
Invalid/blank votes			2,395	2.15
Total votes			111,470	100.00
Registered voters/turnout			172,619	64.58
Source: Keputusan KIP Kota Banda Aceh No. 760 Tahun 2024
