= Banda Aceh City House of Representatives =

Banda Aceh City House of Representatives Dewan Perwakilan Rakyat Kota Banda Aceh
- 2024–2029 period

Type
- Type: Unicameral
- Term limits: 5 years

History
- New session started: 11 September 2024

Leadership
- Speaker: Irwansyah, S.T., PKS since 14 October 2024
- Deputy Speaker: Daniel Abdul Wahab, Nasdem since 14 October 2024
- Deputy Speaker: Dr. Musriadi, S.Pd., M.Pd., PAN since 14 October 2024

Structure
- Seats: 30
- Political groups: Government (9) Gerindra (4) Golkar (3) PPP (2) Support (10) Democratic (5) NasDem (5) Opposition (11) PKS (5) PAN (5) PKB (1)

Elections
- Voting system: Open list
- Last election: 14 February 2024

Meeting place
- Banda Aceh City House of Representatives Building; Tengku Abu Lam U Street Number 7 Kampung Baru, Baiturrahman, Banda Aceh; Aceh, Indonesia

Website
- dprk.bandaacehkota.go.id

The Banda Aceh City House of Representatives (Indonesian: Dewan Perwakilan Rakyat Kota Banda Aceh, DPR Kota Banda Aceh) is the unicameral municipal legislature of Banda Aceh, Aceh, Indonesia. It has 30 members, who are elected every five years, simultaneously with the national legislative election.

== Legal basis ==
The legislature for Banda Aceh was formed along with those of other cities in Aceh under Law Number 8 of 1956, which organized city governments within the province.

== General election results ==
=== 2024 Indonesian legislative election ===
The official valid votes received by political parties contesting the 2024 Indonesian legislative election in each electoral district (constituency) for members of the Banda Aceh City House of Representatives are as follows.

2024 Indonesian legislative election results

Electoral district	PKB	Gerindra	PDI-P	Golkar	NasDem	Labour	Gelora	PKS	PKN	Hanura	Garuda	PAN	PBB	Democratic	PSI	Perindo	PPP	PNA	Gabthat	PDA	PA	PAS Aceh	SIRA	Ummat	Valid votes
Banda Aceh City 1	828	3,010	108	2,743	3,305	36	300	5,051	73	33	17	4,694	70	2,800	39	8	3,718	472	68	7	1,654	959	22	526	30,541
Banda Aceh City 2	373	1,490	369	3,000	3,071	25	287	3,165	20	43	5	2,830	125	2,641	51	15	2,167	165	56	9	363	251	4	280	20,805
Banda Aceh City 3	2,733	2,972	97	4,703	2,262	47	781	5,597	15	15	10	4,327	10	3,103	35	10	1,818	168	218	8	2,182	323	288	1,511	33,233
Banda Aceh City 4	363	2,670	55	1,738	6,786	34	230	4,969	10	386	10	3,296	6	2,769	18	2	2,339	61	113	10	233	252	20	653	27,023
Banda Aceh City 5	438	2,007	141	481	3,413	34	579	2,737	35	6	6	3,384	30	2,033	13	1	1,686	1,739	41	9	344	306	4	127	19,594
Total	4,735	12,149	770	12,665	18,837	176	2,177	21,519	153	483	48	18,531	241	13,346	156	36	11,728	2,605	496	43	4,776	2,091	338	3,097	131,196
Source: General Elections Commission of Indonesia

== Composition ==
The following is the composition of members of the Banda Aceh City House of Representatives in the last three periods.

Party	Total seats		
Party	2014–2019	2019–2024	2024–2029
PKB seats	0	0	▲1
Gerindra seats	2	▲4	4
Golkar seats	3	3	3
NasDem seats	4	▼3	▲5
PKS seats	4	▲5	5
PAN seats	3	▲5	5
Demokrat seats	5	5	5
PPP seats	3	▼2	2
PNA seats	0	▲1	▼0
PNA seats	1	▼0	0
PA seats	4	▼2	▼0
PKPI seats	1	▼0	
Total Seats	30	30	30
Total Party	10	▼9	▼8

== Electoral District ==
In the 2019 Legislative Election and the 2024 Legislative Election, the Banda Aceh City House of Representatives election was divided into 5 electoral districts as follows:

Electoral District Name	Electoral District Area	Number of Seats (2019)	Number of Seats (2024)
BANDA ACEH CITY 1	Baiturrahman, Lueng Bata	7	7
BANDA ACEH CITY 2	Kuta Alam	6	▼5
BANDA ACEH CITY 3	Syiah Kuala, Ulee Kareng	7	7
BANDA ACEH CITY 4	Banda Raya, Jaya Baru	6	6
BANDA ACEH CITY 5	Kuta Raja, Meuraxa	4	▲5
TOTAL		30	30

== See also ==
- Aceh House of Representatives
- Banda Aceh
- Aceh
