= LDK =

LDK may refer to:

== Arts and entertainment ==
- L DK, a romantic comedy manga (first published 2014–2017)
- L.D.K. Lounge Designers Killer, a 2005 album by Capsule

== Businesses and organisations ==
- LDK Solar Co, a Chinese solar wafer manufacturer
- Lembaga Dakwah Kampus, an Indonesian Islamic student organisation
- Lidhja Demokratike e Kosovës, a political party in Kosovo

== Places ==
- Lidköping-Hovby Airport, Sweden (IATA:LDK)
- Grand Duchy of Lithuania, a mediaeval European state (Old Lithuanian: Lietuvos Didžioji Kunigaikštystė)
- Lycée de Kigali, a secondary school in Rwanda

== Other uses ==
- Living room, Dining room, Kitchen, in Japanese accommodation
- Ceritinib or LDK378, a cancer drug
