= University of Abulyatama =

Private university in Aceh Besar, Indonesia

Coordinates: 5.5338°N 95.3891°E

- Type: Private
- Established: 1983
- Location: Aceh Besar, Indonesia
- Website: http://abulyatama.ac.id/

University of Abulyatama is a private university located in Aceh Besar, Indonesia. It was established in 1983.

== History ==
Initially, the university started as a high school, which was managed and founded by the Abulyatama Foundation in Banda Aceh. The foundation also manages Islamic boarding schools, kindergartens, elementary schools, junior high schools, general high schools, STMIK College of Information and Computer Management, AKPER, Nursing Academy and University, all of which are named Abulyatama.
