= Palani Andawer Temple =

Hindu temple in Aceh

Palani Andawer Temple பழனி ஆண்டவர் கோவில் Kuil Palani Andawer
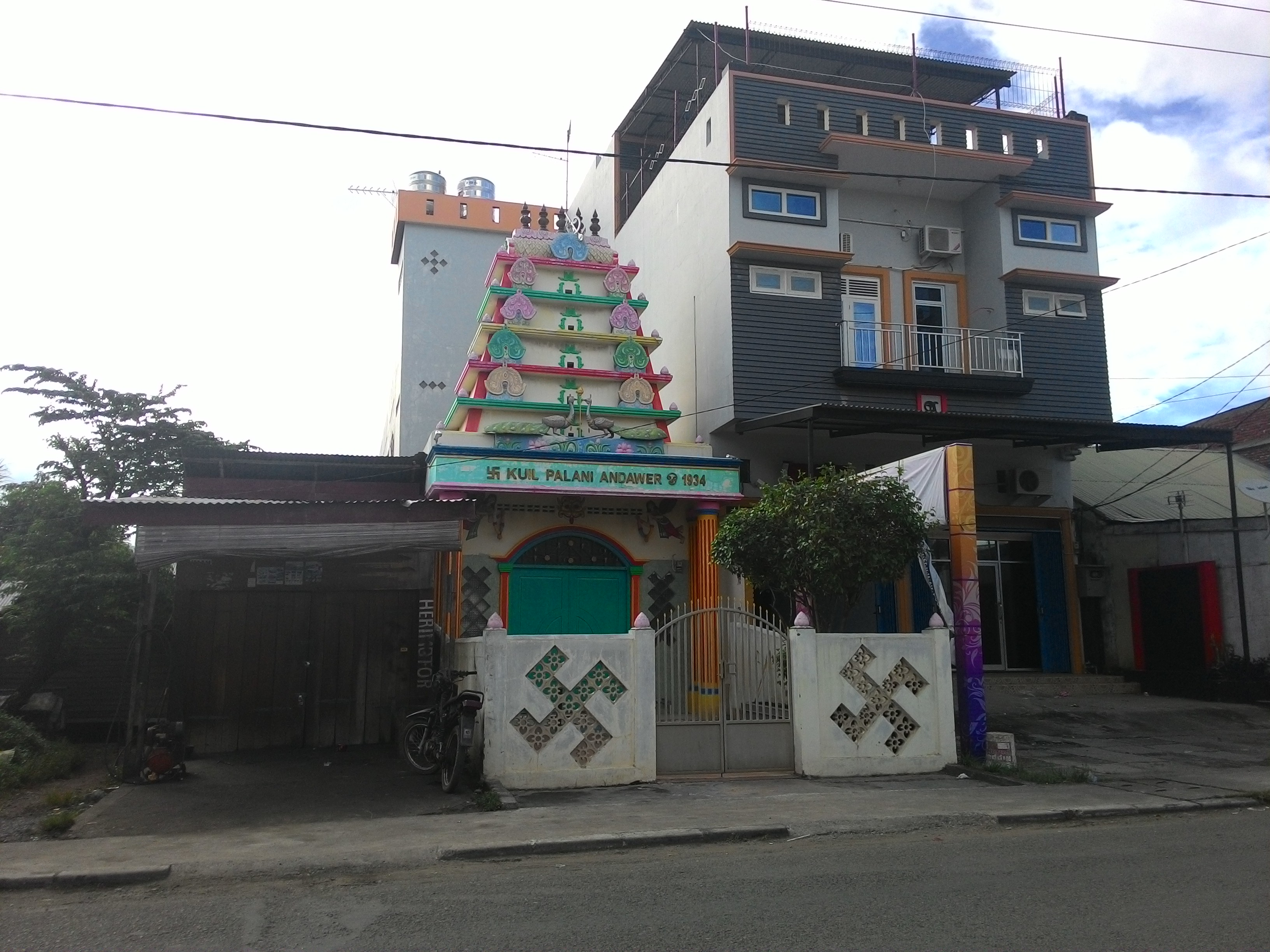

Religion
- Affiliation: Hinduism
- District: Kampung Kedah, Kutaraja
- Deity: Kartikeya
- Festival: Thaipusam

Location
- Location: Banda Aceh
- State: Aceh
- Country: Indonesia
- Interactive map of Palani Andawer Temple பழனி ஆண்டவர் கோவில் Kuil Palani Andawer

Architecture
- Type: Dravidian architecture
- Completed: 1934

Palani Andawer Temple is the oldest and only Hindu temple in Aceh, Indonesia. This temple was built in 1934 by Tamil Immigrants. It is the only place of worship for hundreds of Hindus in the provincial capital. This building was destroyed during the 2004 tsunami, but was finally able to be renovated back to its current form. This temple is focal point for Thaipusam festival in Aceh.

== Architecture ==
Specifically, in this temple there are two important buildings, namely the Murugan altar and the Ganesha altar which we know as the elephant statue. The Murugan altar is purple, on this altar there is a lotus flower symbol and above it is the Om symbol flanked by two budding coconuts. The lotus symbol is the abode of the gods, and the coconut symbolizes the value of the benefits of a human being. In front of these two altars there is a special building that resembles a pillar. At the top of this pole pinned nine bells as a symbol of the nine holes in the human body. The value contained through this bell symbol is, those who will enter the temple must clean nine holes in their bodies, such as the ear and nose holes.

On the walls are three statues of Lord Murugan, specially designed by a Tamil artist from Medan. While on the left side there is a symbol of Dewata Nawa Sanga, which belongs to Balinese Hinduism. Dewata Nawa Sanga is a symbol of the nine cardinal directions. Where each cardinal direction has a special color that is guarded by different Gods with different types of weapons.

== Location ==
This temple is located not far from the entrance gate to Gampong Keudah, Kutaraja District, Banda Aceh.
