= Syiah Kuala =

Administrative district in Aceh, Indonesia

- Administrative District of Bandar Aceh city
- Kecamatan Syiah Kuala
- Interactive map of Syiah Kuala
- Location of Syiah Kuala in Aceh Syiah Kuala (Northern Sumatra) Syiah Kuala (Indonesia)
- Coordinates: 5°30′47.9″N 95°19′36.1″E
- Country: Indonesia
- Province: Aceh
- Regency: Aceh Besar Regency
- District seat: Meunasah

Area
  - Total: 14.24 km^{2} (5.50 sq mi)

Population (2024)
  - Total: 35,056
  - Density: 2,462/km^{2} (6,376/sq mi)
- Time zone: UTC+7 (WIT)
- Postcode: 23381
- Calling code: 0651
- Vehicle registration plates: BL

Syiah Kuala is the most eastern administrative district (kecamatan) within the city of Bandar Aceh, in Aceh Province of Indonesia. This district covers an area of 14.24 square kilometres and has a population of 35,056 people in mid 2024.

== Governance ==
=== Villages ===
Syiah Kuala District, which contains part of the far eastern suburbs of Banda Aceh city, is divided into three mukims (townships/subdistricts), namely mukim Kayee Adang and mukim Tgk. Syeh Abdur Rauf in the west and mukim Tgk. Chik di Lamnyong in the east, separated by the wide Lamnyong River. The district in total consists of 10 villages (listed below with their areas and their populations as at mid 2024), in turn sub-divided into 41 hamlets (dusun):

Kode Wilayah	Name of gampong	Name of mukim	Area in km^{2}	Pop'n Estimate mid 2024	No. of hamlets (dusun)
11.06.09.2013	Ie Masen Kayee Adang	Kayee Adang	0.70	4,759	3
11.06.09.2010	Pineung	Kayee Adang	0.62	4,273	5
11.06.09.2012	Lamgugob	Kayee Adang	1.53	4,448	3
11.06.09.2011	Peurada	Kayee Adang	0.32	2,687	3
11.06.09.2009	Kopelma Darussalam	Tgk. Chik di Lamnyong	2.06	3,107	5
11.06.09.2008	Rukoh	Tgk. Chik di Lamnyong	0.95	4,018	5
11.06.09.2002	Jeulingke	Tgk. Syeh Abdur Rauf	1.54	5,932	6
11.06.09.2001	Tibang	Tgk. Syeh Abdur Rauf	2.31	2,141	3
11.06.09.2004	Deah Raya	Tgk. Syeh Abdur Rauf	1.78	1,383	4
11.06.09.2006	Alue Naga	Tgk. Syeh Abdur Rauf	2.43	2,308	4
	Totals		14.24	35,056	41

Kopelma Durusalam and Rukoh gampongs, located on the eastern side of the Lamnyong River, are physically more associated with the eastern suburbs of Bandar Aceh city, contained in the Baitusalam and Darussalam Districts (plus the three gampongs of Lamnga, Baru and Neuheun in Mesjid Raya District) of Aceh Besar Regency.
