= Gunongan Historical Park =

Coordinates: 5.54588°N 95.31623°E

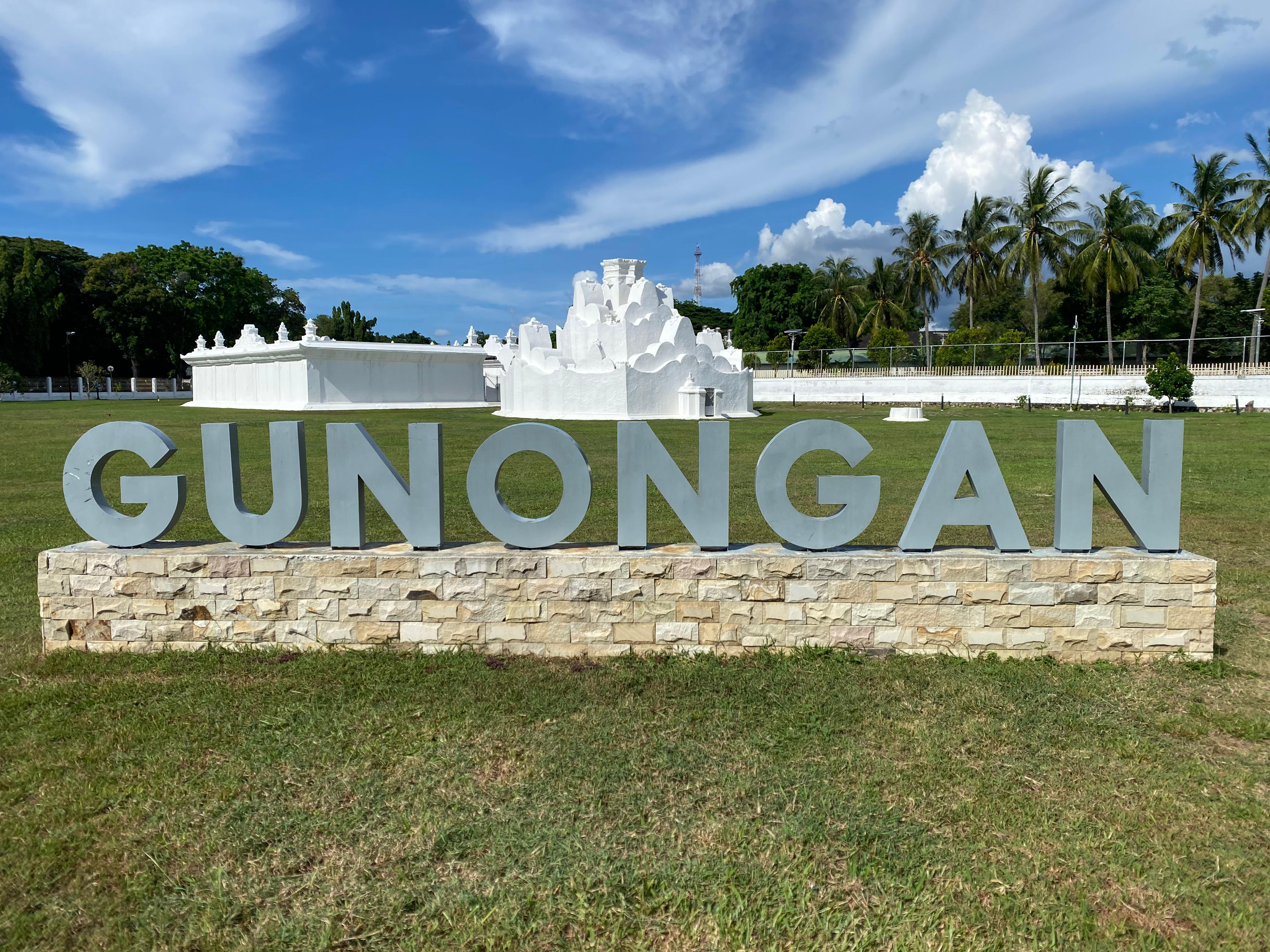
Gunongan, built by Sultan Iskandar Muda in the 17th century, symbolized his love for Putroe Phang.

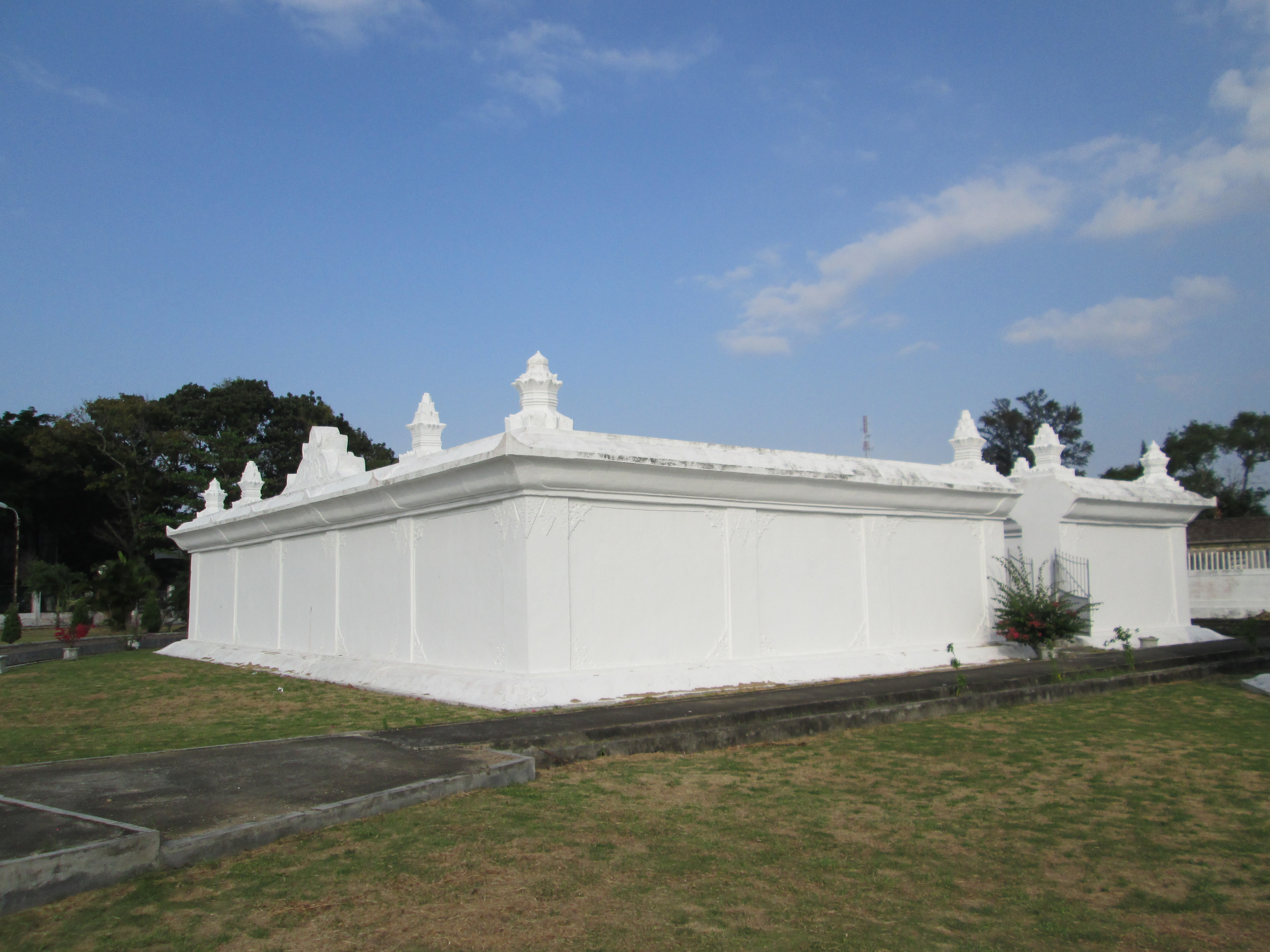
Kandang Taman Ghairah

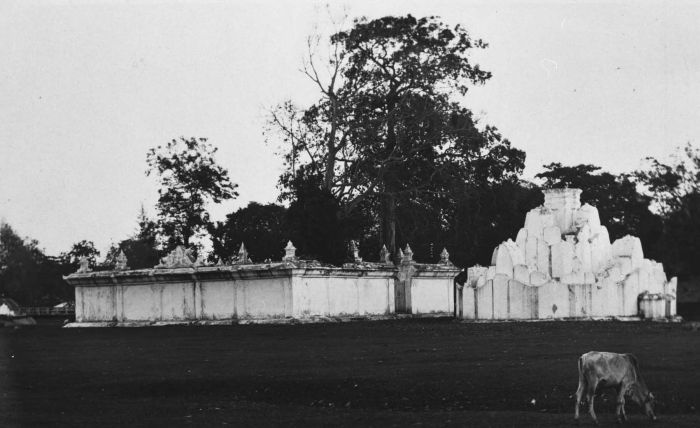
The Gunongan around 1910-1930

Gunongan Historical Park (Jawi: ڬونوڠن) is located in the Aceh Province of Sumatra, Indonesia. Possibly built by Iskandar Muda, the grounds of the historical park contain a 17th-century palace, garden, and white circular structure whose purpose is unknown, the Gunongan, after which the park has been named. The origins and function of the Gunongan palace are obscure, though it is theorized to be either built on the remains of an older structure or built during the 17th century, combining Hindu and Islamic aesthetics. Its function possibly had a sacred significance but it later became a leisure ground for the Acehnese royal family.

== History ==
The Gunungan Historical Park was then known as Taman Ghairah (Acehnese "pleasure garden"). According to ar-Raniri, a 17th-century Islamic mystic from Gujarat who worked several years for the Sultan, The garden was built by Iskandar Thani in the mid-17th century as part of the court of Aceh Sultanate; not different with Taman Sari to the Sultanate of Yogyakarta. It is possible that the garden has existed way before Iskandar Thani, as it is unlikely that the grand and spacious garden was built in its entirety during the five-year reign of Iskandar Thani. Several parks has existed in the vicinity of the Acehnese palace as mentioned in Hikayat Aceh, e.g. an older 16th-century garden built by the infamous Sultan Zayn al-Abidin.

ar-Raniri, a 17th-century Islamic mystic from Gujarat who worked several years for the Sultan, describe the garden in elaborate detail. The garden is a walled royal pleasure garden about 1,000 fathoms (1.8 km) wide. On the side leading towards the palace stood a gate known as Pintu Biram Indera Bangsa. Inside the garden were several structures e.g. the Gunongan, a mosque known as 'Isyqi Musyahadah, and a number of pavilions e.g. Balai Cermin Perang, Balai Rekaan Cina, Balai Keemasan, and Balai Kumbang Caya. Through the middle of the garden flowed a creek, named Dar al-'Ishqi, which flows north toward the Aceh River. Another structure in the garden was carved stone structures e.g. the Kembang Seroja Berkerawang and the Petarana Kembang Berukir. The garden was also embelisshed with a fountain in the shape of two dragons. Many kind of fruit trees were planted within the garden.

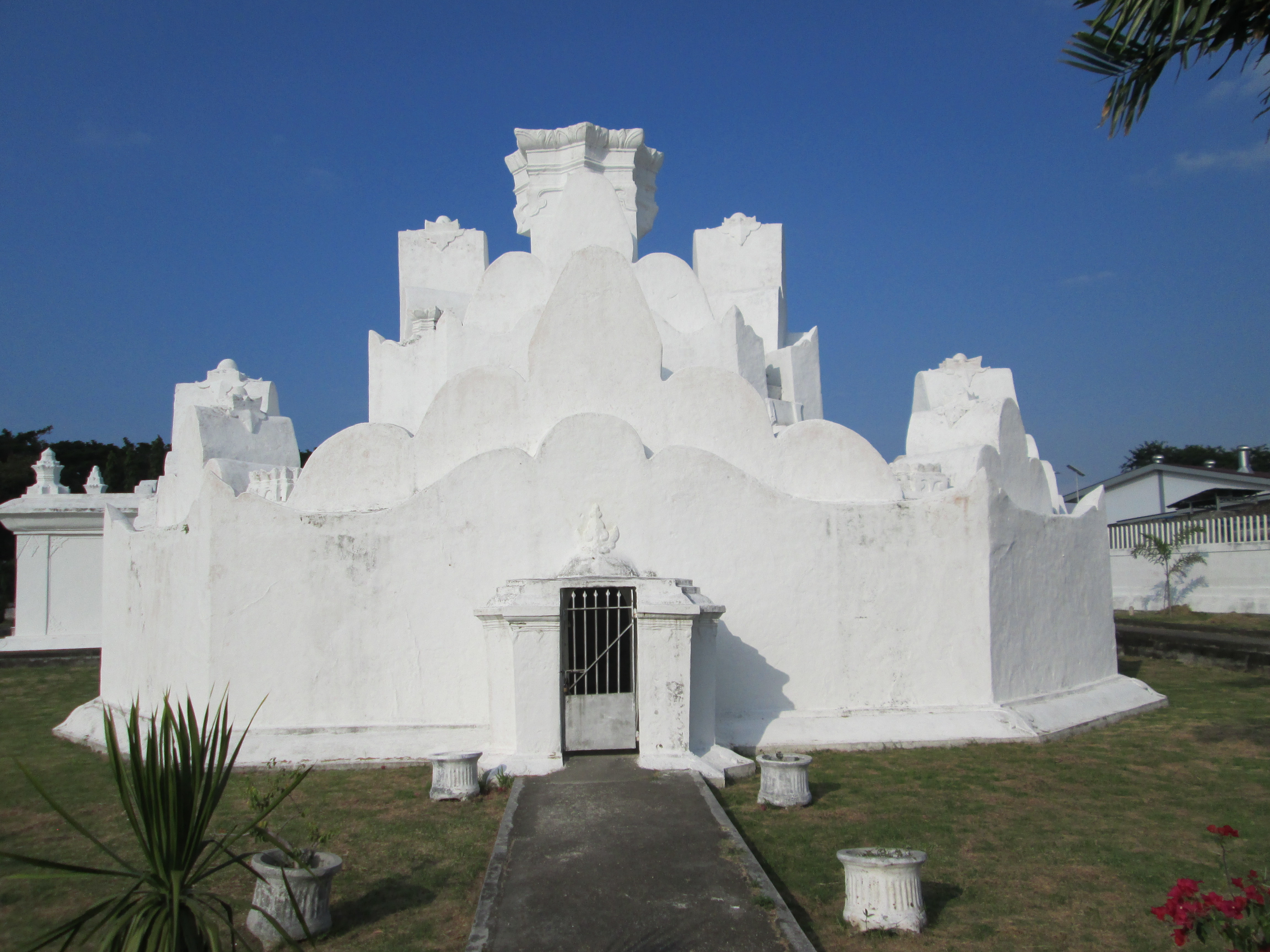
Gunongan

The Gunongan, then known as Gegunungan Menara Permata ("gunungan of jeweled tower") stood in the middle of a marbled square known as Medan Khairani. The Gunongan is basically a gunungan, a typical element of an Indonesian garden found in Java, Bali and Lombok; although there has been an argument that the garden was more similar to the Islamic Persian garden. It is possible that the Gunongan structure was older than the entire extend of the garden. According to Hikayat Malem Dagang and Hikayat Meukuta Alam, the Gunongan was built by Iskandar Muda for his Malay consort, the princess of Pahang. The Hikayat Malem Dagang recounts that two princes of the Malay Peninsula, Raja si Ujut and Raja Radén, brought this lady, Putroe Phang, to Aceh. They sought a judgement from Sultan Iskandar Muda in a quarrel between them. Iskandar found in favor of Raja Radén, and received from him Putroe Phang. For her relaxation he built the Gunongan, because she was homesick for the mountains of her native land.

== See also ==
- Taman Sari (Yogyakarta)

== Cited works ==
- Iskandar Muda (2011). Feener, R. Michael; Daly, Patrick; Reid, Anthony (eds.). Mapping the Acehnese Past: Aceh as a crucible of Muslim-Malay literature. Verhandelingen van het Koninklijk Instituut voor Taal-, Land- en Volkenkunde. Vol. 268. Leiden: KITLV Press. ISBN 9789067183659.
