= Banda Aceh =

Capital and largest city of Aceh, Indonesia

Banda Aceh Kutaraja
- Special region capital
- City of Banda Aceh; Kota Banda Aceh

Regional transcription(s)
  - Acehnese: Kuta Banda Acèh (Latin) بند اچيه (Jawoe)
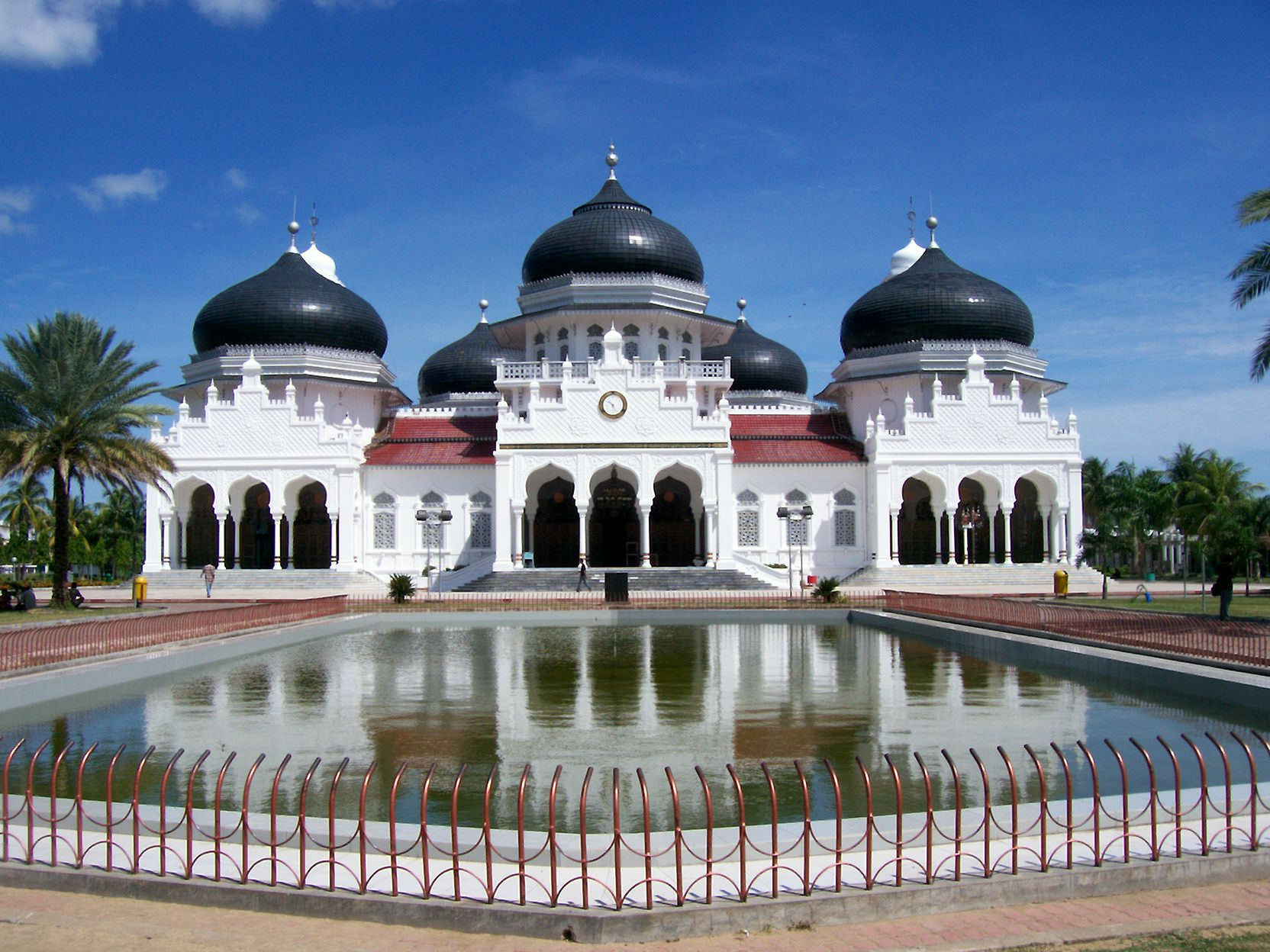
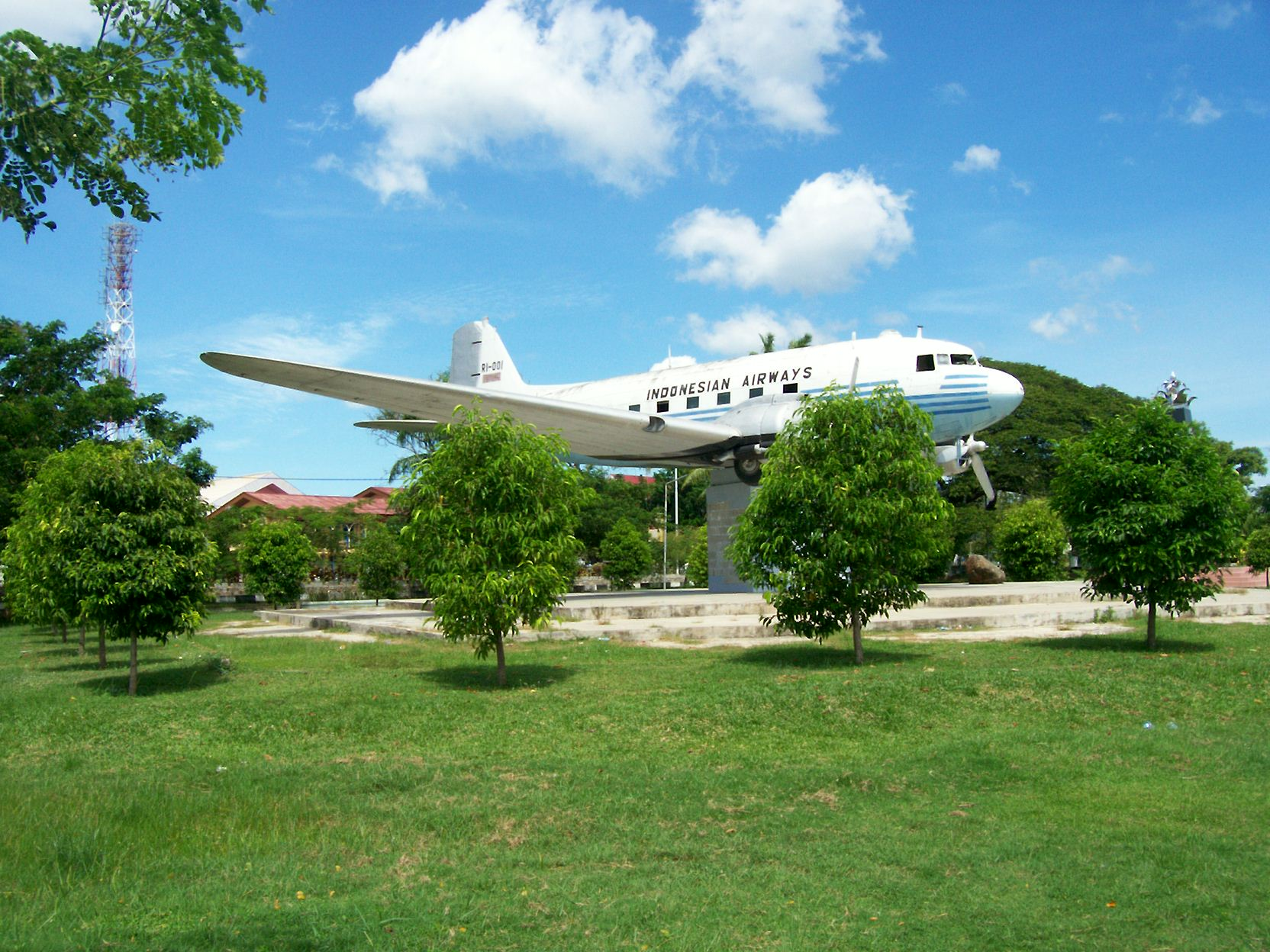
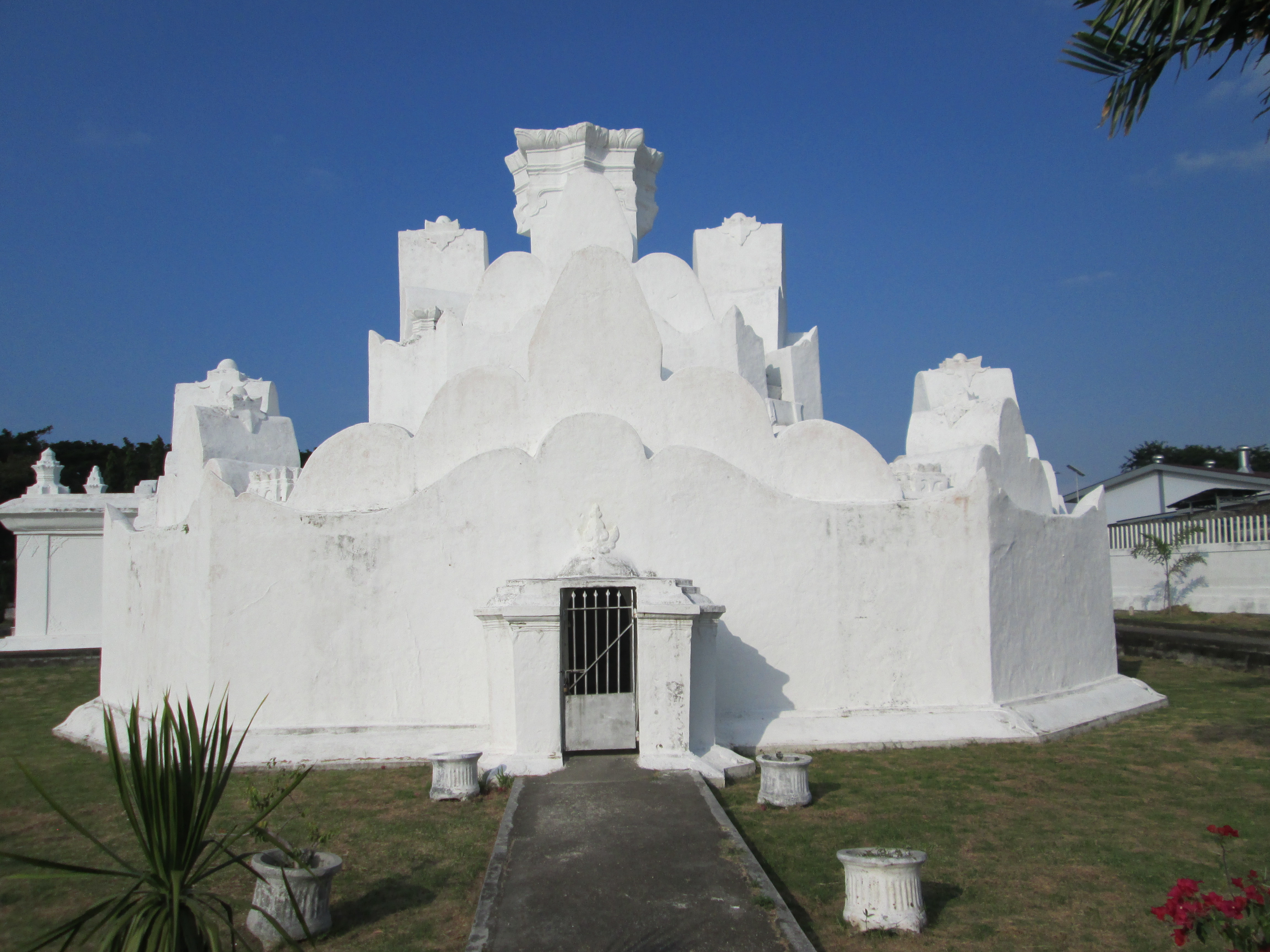
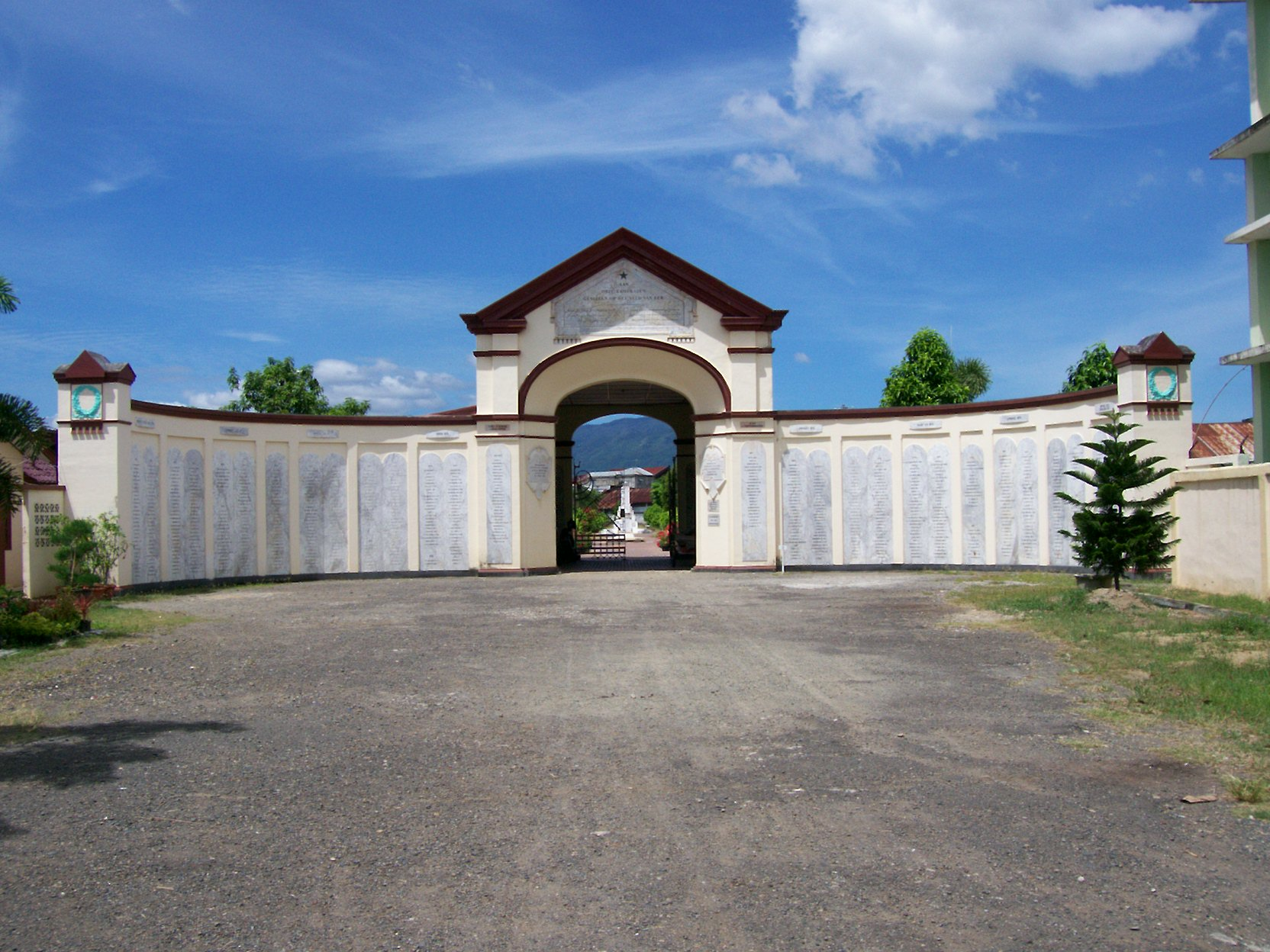
- Baiturrahman Grand Mosque Aceh Tsunami Museum Seulawah 001 Monument Gunongan Historical Park Kerkhof Peucut

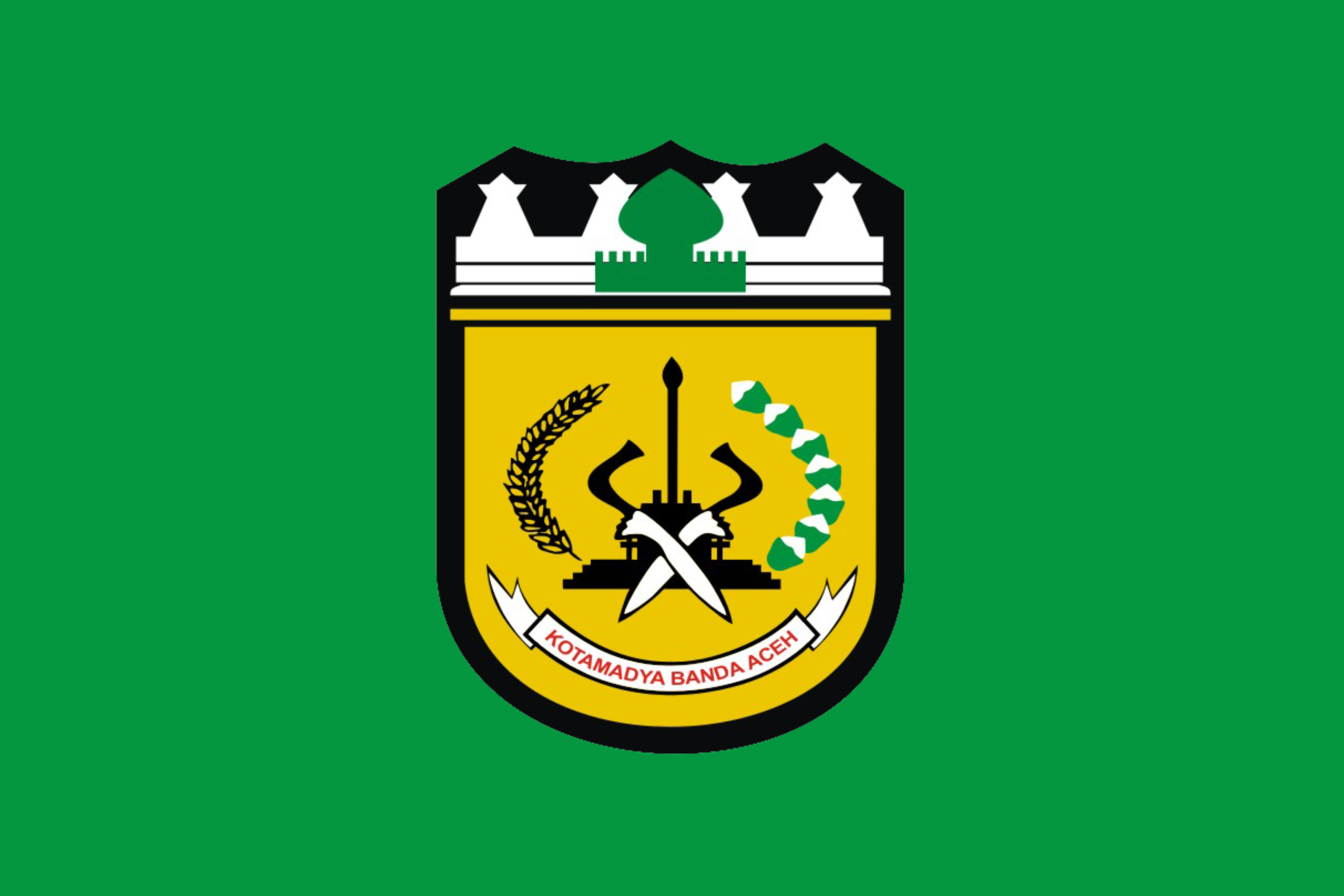
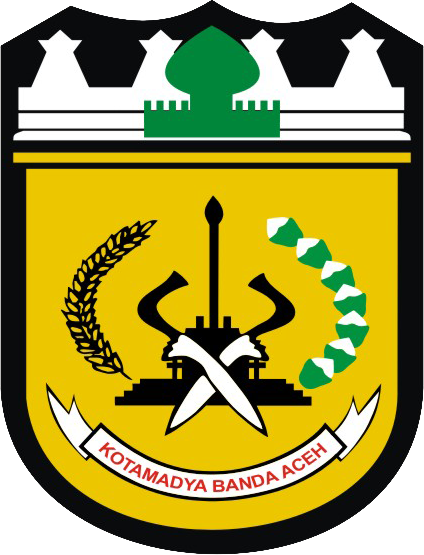
- Flag Coat of arms
- Nickname: Kota Serambi Mekkah (the Porch of Mecca)
- Motto: Saboeh Pakat Tabangun Banda (Acehnese) (One Agreement to Build a City)
- Interactive map of Banda Aceh
- Location in Sumatra, Indonesia and the Bay of Bengal Banda Aceh (Indonesia) Banda Aceh (Bay of Bengal)
- Coordinates: 5.55°N 95.3175°E
- Country: Indonesia
- Province: Aceh
- Founded: April 22, 1205; 821 years ago Incorporated: November 14, 1956; 69 years ago

Government
  - Type: Mayor–council
  - Body: Banda Aceh City Government
  - Mayor: Illiza Sa'aduddin Djamal (PPP)
  - Vice Mayor: Afdhal Khalilullah
  - Legislature: Banda Aceh City House of Representatives (DPRK)

Area
  - Special region capital: 61.36 km^{2} (23.69 sq mi)
  - Metro: 2,935.36 km^{2} (1,133.35 sq mi)
- Elevation: 0–10 m (0–33 ft)

Population (mid 2025 estimate)
  - Special region capital: 267,962
  - Density: 4,367/km^{2} (11,310/sq mi)
  - Metro: 513,698
  - Metro density: 175.003/km^{2} (453.257/sq mi)
- Demonyms: Banda Acehnese
- Time zone: UTC+7 (Indonesia Western Time)
- Postal code: 23000
- Area code: (+62) 651
- Vehicle registration: BL
- HDI (2024): ▲0.8717 (2nd) – (very high)
- Website: bandaacehkota.go.id

Banda Aceh (/ˌbʌndə ˈɑːtʃeɪ/ BUN-də AH-chay; Acehnese: Banda Acèh, Jawoe: بند اچيه) is the capital and largest city in the Indonesian province of Aceh. It is located on the island of Sumatra and has an elevation of 35 metres (115 ft). The city covers an area of 61.36 square kilometers (23.69 sq mi) and had a population of 223,446 people at the 2010 census, rising to 252,899 at the 2020 census. The official estimate as of 2025 was 267,962 (comprising 134,451 males and 133,511 females).

Banda Aceh is located on the northwestern tip of Indonesia at the mouth of the Aceh River. It is a semi-enclave within Aceh Besar Regency, as Banda Aceh is surrounded by Aceh Besar to the south, east, and west, while it borders with the Andaman Sea to the northwest. Many suburbs of the city have developed in adjacent districts of Acah Besar Regency beyond the city limits.

The city was originally established as Bandar Aceh Darussalam and served as the capital and hub for the Sultanate of Aceh upon its foundation in the late 15th century. Later its name was changed to Bandar Aceh Darussalam, and thereafter became popularly known as Banda Aceh. The first part of the name comes from the Persian bandar (بندر) meaning "port" or "haven". The city is also dubbed the "port to Mecca," or the "porch of Mecca" (Indonesian: Serambi Mekkah) in reference to the days when hajj pilgrims travelled by sea from Indonesia and would make a stopover in the city before continuing their journey to Mecca.

Banda Aceh was long at the center of protracted conflicts between the Acehnese and foreign powers, including the Portuguese, the Dutch, the Japanese, and the Indonesian government. The city rose to international prominence in the aftermath of the 2004 Indian Ocean earthquake, which struck off the western coast of Sumatra. Banda Aceh was the closest major city to the earthquake's epicenter, which lay 249 kilometers (155 miles) off the coast. It suffered great damage in the earthquake and further damage when a tsunami struck shortly afterwards. Around 60,000 people in the city died as a result and many more were injured.

The aftermath of the tsunami saw a cessation of conflict between the government and the Free Aceh Movement, as well as an increase in domestic and international aid. Consequently, the city itself has seen major modernization and reconstruction over the past two decades.

== History ==
Banda Aceh, situated at the tip of Sumatra, has long been a strategic transportation and trading hub in the eastern Indian Ocean. Its first mention in western accounts comes from 1292 when Marco Polo and his expedition visited the city, referred to as "Lambri" from Lamuri Kingdom which previously existed there and noted as the logical first port of call for travellers from Arabia and India to Indonesia. Ibn Battuta also reported visiting the city in the mid-14th century when under the control of the trading kingdom of Samudera Pasai, the then-dominant entity in northern Sumatra. However the Pasai began to collapse under pressure from declining economic conditions and the Portuguese, who occupied much of the area after occupying Malacca in the early 16th century. Sultan Ali Mughayat Syah, ruler of the newly founded Sultanate of Aceh, aggressively expanded in the area in the 1520s and established sultanate was built on the remains of the Pasai and other extinct kingdoms in the area, and made Banda Aceh the capital, naming it for himself as Kutaraja or 'City of the King'.

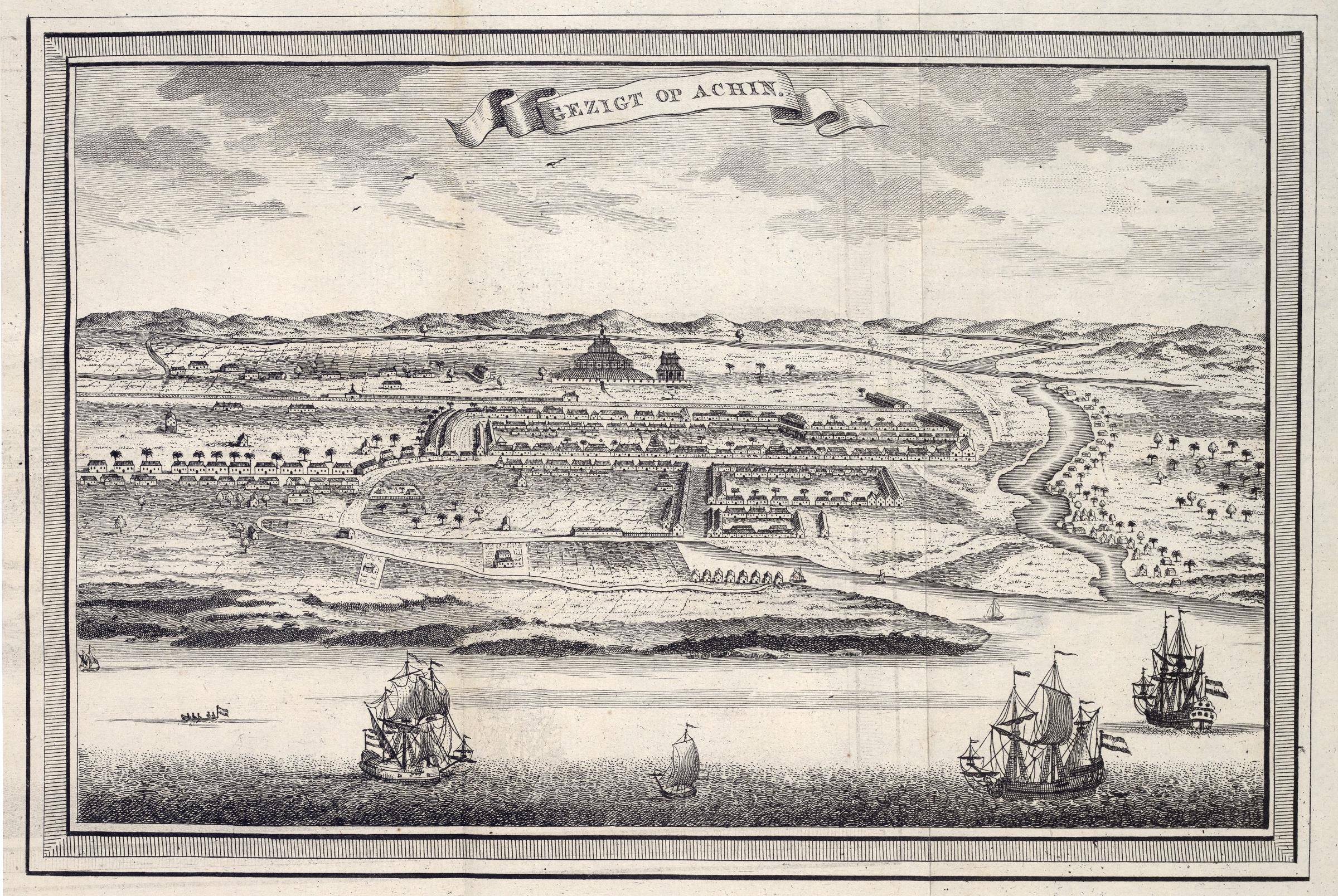
Koetaradja (Banda Aceh) old map

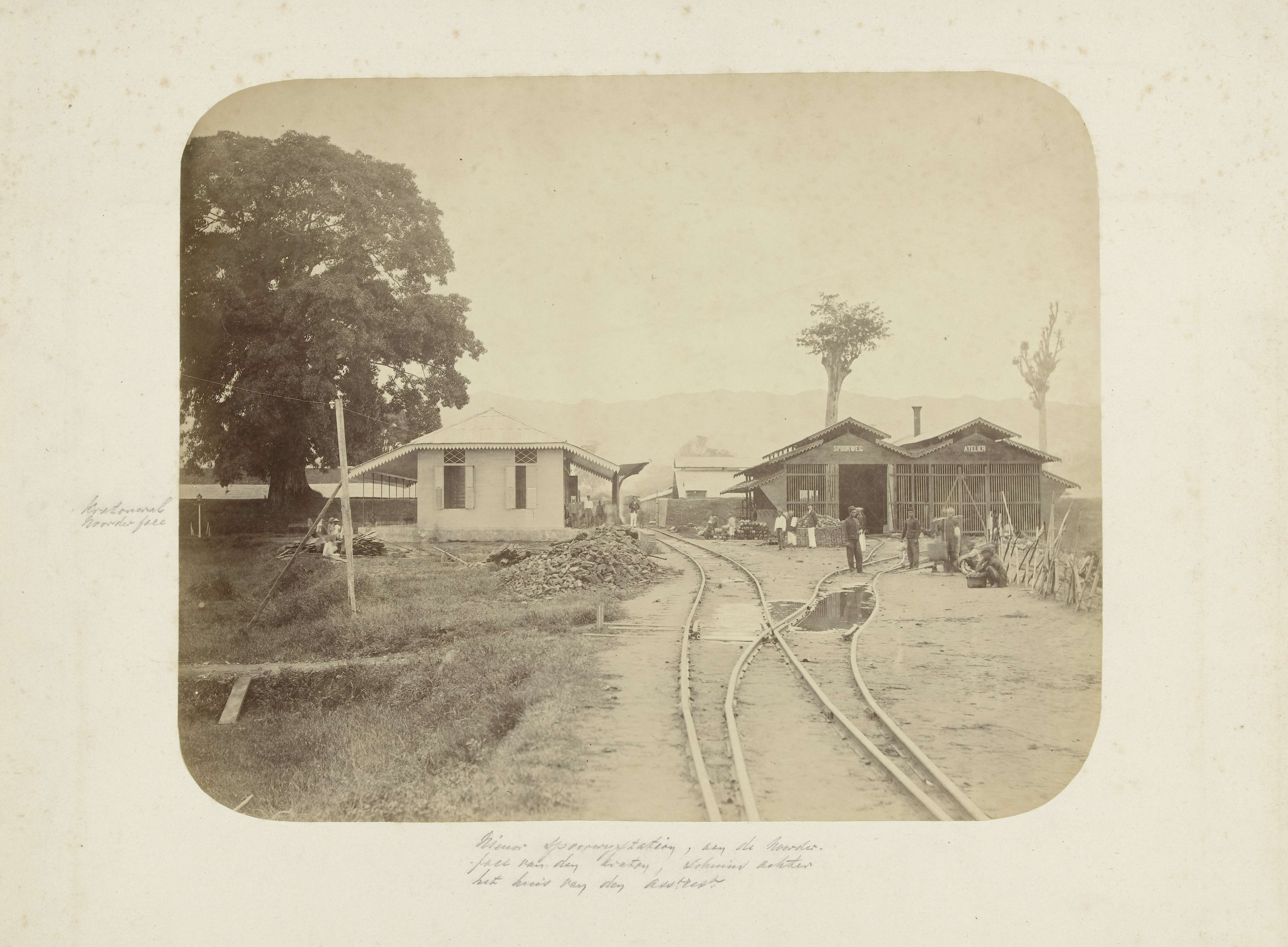
A train station in Koetaradja (Banda Aceh) c. 1870–1900

After a long period of rule by the sultanate, Aceh began to come into conflict with the Dutch and the British in the second half of the 18th century. At the end of the 18th century, the territory of Aceh in the Malay Peninsula, namely Kedah and Pulau Pinang, were seized by the British. In 1871, the Dutch began to threaten Aceh, and on 26 March 1873, the Dutch formally declared war on Aceh. The Dutch bombarded the capital in that year and sought to capture the sultan's palace in the city to bring about a capitulation of the Acehnese. Significant support from the British in the region led the modernization and fortification of the city, and while coastal areas were lost the Dutch underestimated the city's defenses. The Dutch expedition commander General Johan Köhler was killed in a skirmish around the city, leading to the failure of the first expedition. A second expedition was mounted by the Dutch within months and was successful in overwhelming the city. The Dutch moved into the capital in January 1874 believing the Acehnese to have surrendered; however, the conflict moved into the countryside, and the Acehnese continued to actively oppose Dutch rule.

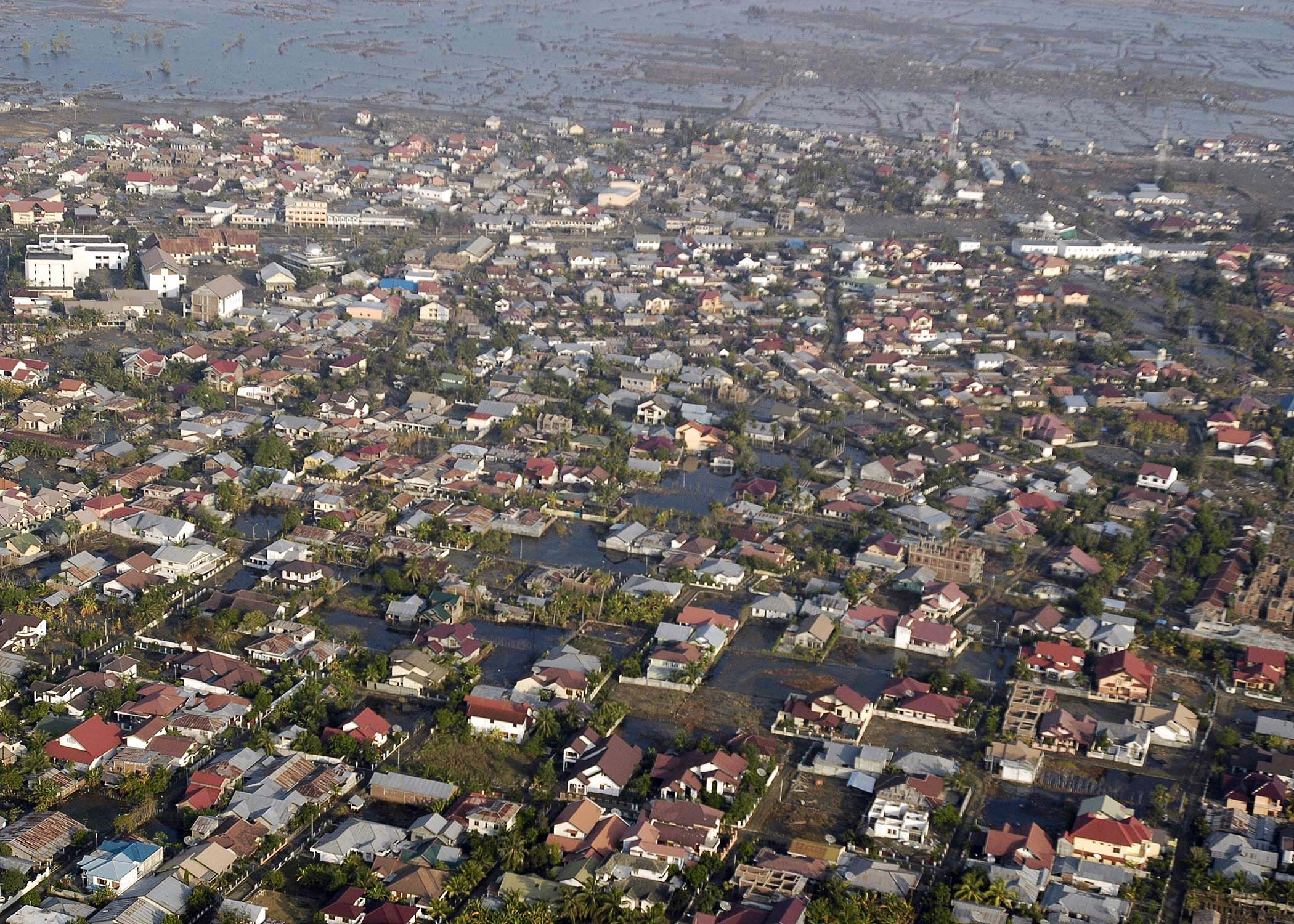
Banda Aceh aerial view after the tsunami disaster, 2004

After it entered the Government of the Republic of Indonesia on 28 December 1962, the name of the city was changed back to Banda Aceh by the Ministry of Public Administration and Regional Autonomy on 9 May 1963.

=== 2004 Aceh Tsunami ===
On 26 December 2004, the city was hit by a tsunami caused by a 9.2-magnitude earthquake in the Indian Ocean. The disaster killed 167,000 inhabitants and destroyed more than 60% of the city's buildings. Based on the statistical data issued by the City Government of Banda Aceh, Banda Aceh had 248,727 inhabitants in May 2012, while the Indonesian national census of 2020 showed a population of 252,899. The official estimate as of mid-2025 was 267,962.

=== 2023 Rohingya Protests ===
On 27 December 2023, hundreds of students from various universities in Aceh, such as: Abulyatama University, Bina Bangsa Getsempena University, and University of Muhammadiyah Aceh, stormed a shelter for Rohingya refugees and forced them out of a convention centre in the city of Banda Aceh, demanding they be deported. The students also seen kicking the belongings of the Rohingya men, women, and children who seated on the floor and crying in fear. They burned tyres and chanting "Kick them out" and "Reject Rohingya in Aceh".

== Religion ==
The religion of the majority of the population is Islam, with minorities including Buddhists, Christians (both Protestant and Catholic), and Hindus.

Banda Aceh is home to four long-standing churches: the Hati Kudus Catholic Church, Western Indonesian Protestant Church (GPIB), Methodist Church (GMI), and the Batak Protestant Church (HKBP). There are 93 mosques and 112 mushollas (Places for islamic prayer.) There is a Buddhist temple and a Hindu temple in the city.

The Hindu community consists of both Balinese Hindus and Tamil Hindus who originate from southern India.

There is a type of police in Indonesia called the religious police; they enforce Islamic laws in the Islamic majority province. They are known for being very strict.

== Climate ==
Banda Aceh features a tropical rainforest climate under the Köppen climate classification, with near-constant average temperatures. The city's annual average temperature is 27.3 °C or 81.1 °F. However, the city features wetter and drier seasons, with summer (June through August) being the driest season of the year. Both the hottest and coldest temperatures are recorded during summer. Late fall and early winter (October to December) is the rainiest time in Banda Aceh. Like other cities with a tropical rainforest climate, Banda Aceh does not have a true dry season, with the driest month averaging 90 millimeters or 3.54 inches of precipitation. On average, the city experiences a little less than 2,000 millimeters or 79 inches of precipitation annually.

Climate data for Banda Aceh
Month	Jan	Feb	Mar	Apr	May	Jun	Jul	Aug	Sep	Oct	Nov	Dec	Year
Mean daily maximum °C (°F)	27.8 (82.0)	28.8 (83.8)	31.0 (87.8)	32.0 (89.6)	30.0 (86.0)	30.3 (86.5)	30.1 (86.2)	30.9 (87.6)	30.1 (86.2)	30.5 (86.9)	28.9 (84.0)	27.9 (82.2)	29.9 (85.7)
Daily mean °C (°F)	25.9 (78.6)	26.5 (79.7)	27.3 (81.1)	28.3 (82.9)	27.6 (81.7)	27.9 (82.2)	27.5 (81.5)	28.2 (82.8)	27.4 (81.3)	28.0 (82.4)	26.8 (80.2)	26.2 (79.2)	27.3 (81.1)
Mean daily minimum °C (°F)	24.1 (75.4)	24.2 (75.6)	23.7 (74.7)	24.6 (76.3)	25.2 (77.4)	25.6 (78.1)	24.9 (76.8)	25.6 (78.1)	24.7 (76.5)	25.5 (77.9)	24.7 (76.5)	24.5 (76.1)	24.8 (76.6)
Average rainfall mm (inches)	155 (6.1)	103 (4.1)	109 (4.3)	121 (4.8)	152 (6.0)	90 (3.5)	97 (3.8)	107 (4.2)	161 (6.3)	194 (7.6)	209 (8.2)	236 (9.3)	1,734 (68.2)

== Administrative districts ==
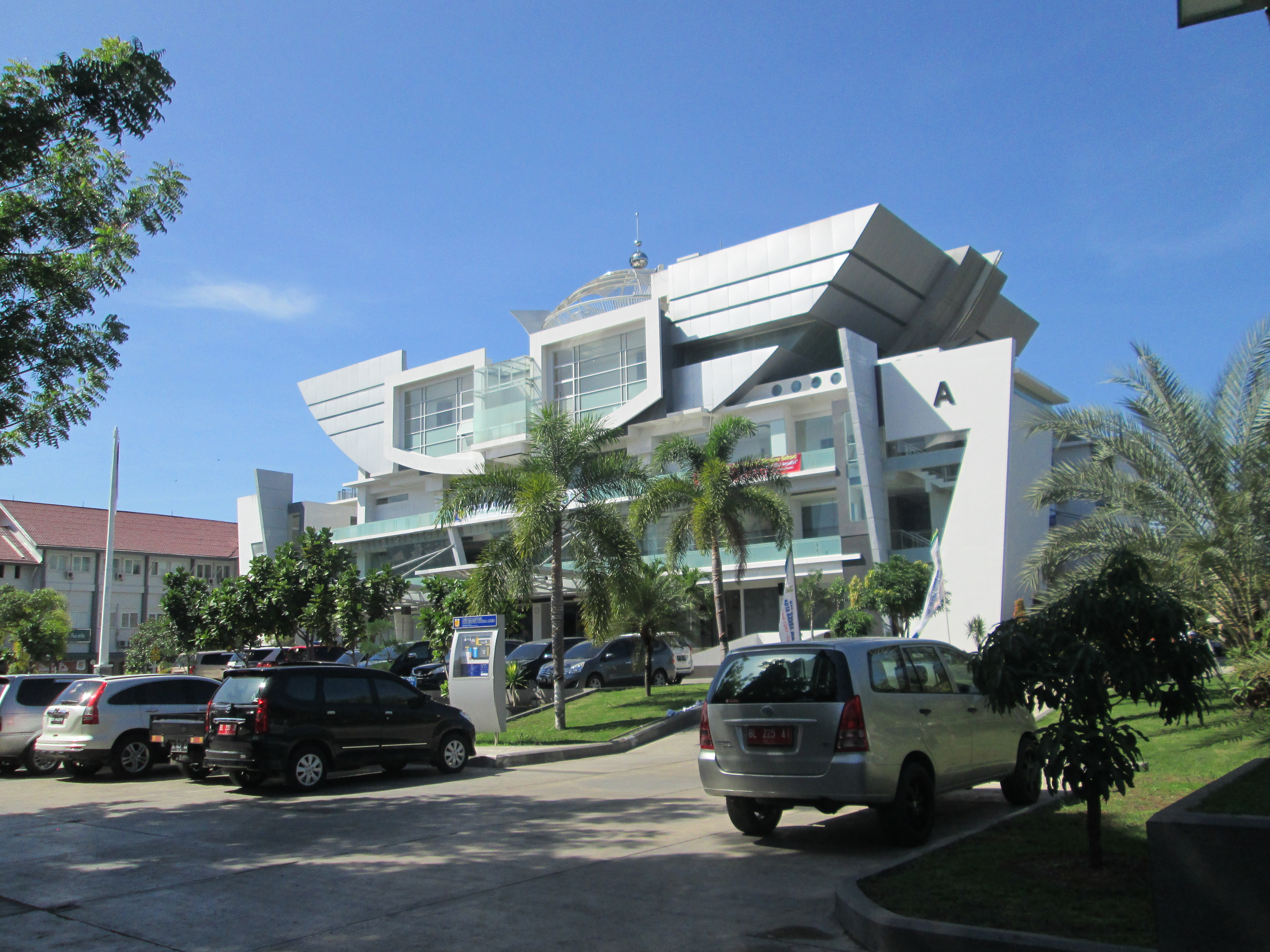
Mayor's office of Banda Aceh

Banda Aceh is divided into nine districts (Indonesian: kecamatan), listed below with their areas and their populations at the 2010 Census and the 2020 Census, together with the official estimates as of mid 2025. The table also includes the numbers of urban villages (gampong) in each district, and its postal codes.

Kode Wilayah	Name of District (kecamatan)	Area in km^{2}	Pop'n at 2010 Census	Pop'n at 2020 Census	Pop'n mid 2025 Estimate	No. of villages	Post codes
11.71.03	Meuraxa	7.26	16,484	26,861	26,509	16	23232 - 23234
11.71.08	Jaya Baru	3.78	22,031	25,939	27,862	9	23230 - 23236
11.71.07	Banda Raya	4.79	20,891	25,228	27,261	10	23238 - 23239
11.71.01	Baiturrahman	4.54	30,377	32,513	34,891	10	23241 - 23245
11.71.05	Lueng Bata	5.34	23,592	24,336	26,392	9	23244 - 23249
11.71.02	Kuta Alam	10.21	42,217	42,505	45,861	11	23126 - 23127
11.71.06	Kuta Raja	5.21	10,433	15,291	15,285	6	23128 - 23142
11.71.04	Syiah Kuala ^{(a)}	14.24	34,850	32,969	35,336	10	23111 - 23116
11.71.09	Ulee Kareng	6.15	22,571	27,257	28,565	9	23117 - 23119
	Totals	61.36	223,446	252,899	267,962	90	

Notes: (a) Kuta Raja, Syiah Kuala and Ulee Kareng Districts lie on the east bank of the Aceh River, while the other six Districts are on the west bank. The coastal district of Syiah Kuala actually extends further east still, crossing the wide Lamnyong River to include the villages (gampong) of Kopelma Darussalam and Rukok which adjoin the suburbs of Baitussalam and Darussalam east of the city in Baitussalam and Darussalam Districts of Aceh Besar Regency. Note that many suburbs of Bandar Aceh lie outside the city's official boundaries, in adjacent districts of Aceh Besar Regency, notably to the south in Darul Imarah, Ingin Jaya (which is divided by the Aceh River into two portions) and Krueng Barona Jaya Districts (with a combined population of 118,792 in mid 2025), but also partly in Peukan Bada District to the west and in Baitussalam and Darussalam Districts to the east of the city, all now forming part of the built-up area.

== Tourism ==
As the capital of the Aceh province, Banda Aceh is home to many landmarks important to the history of the Acehnese people and the sultanates.

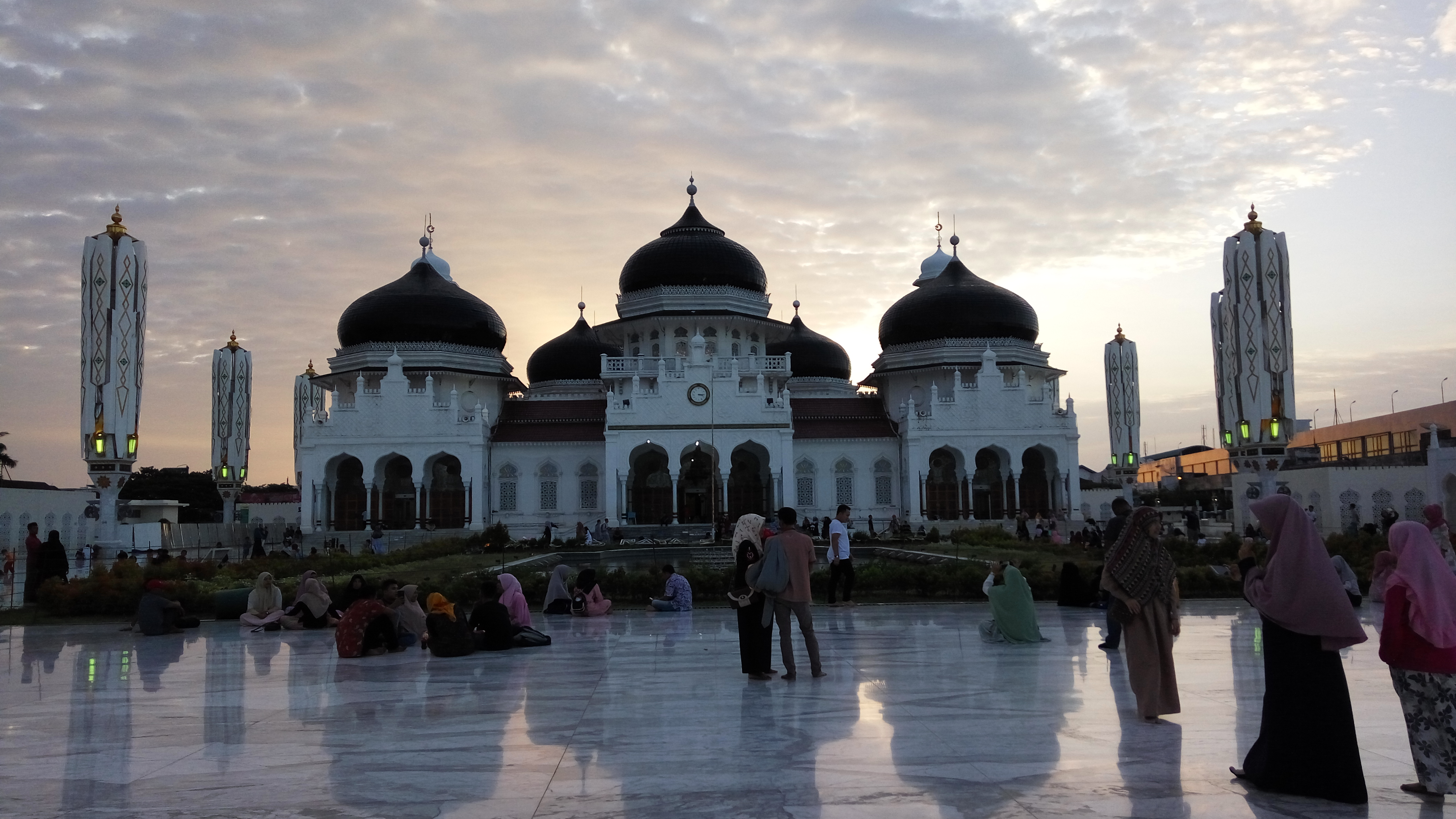
Baiturrahman Grand Mosque

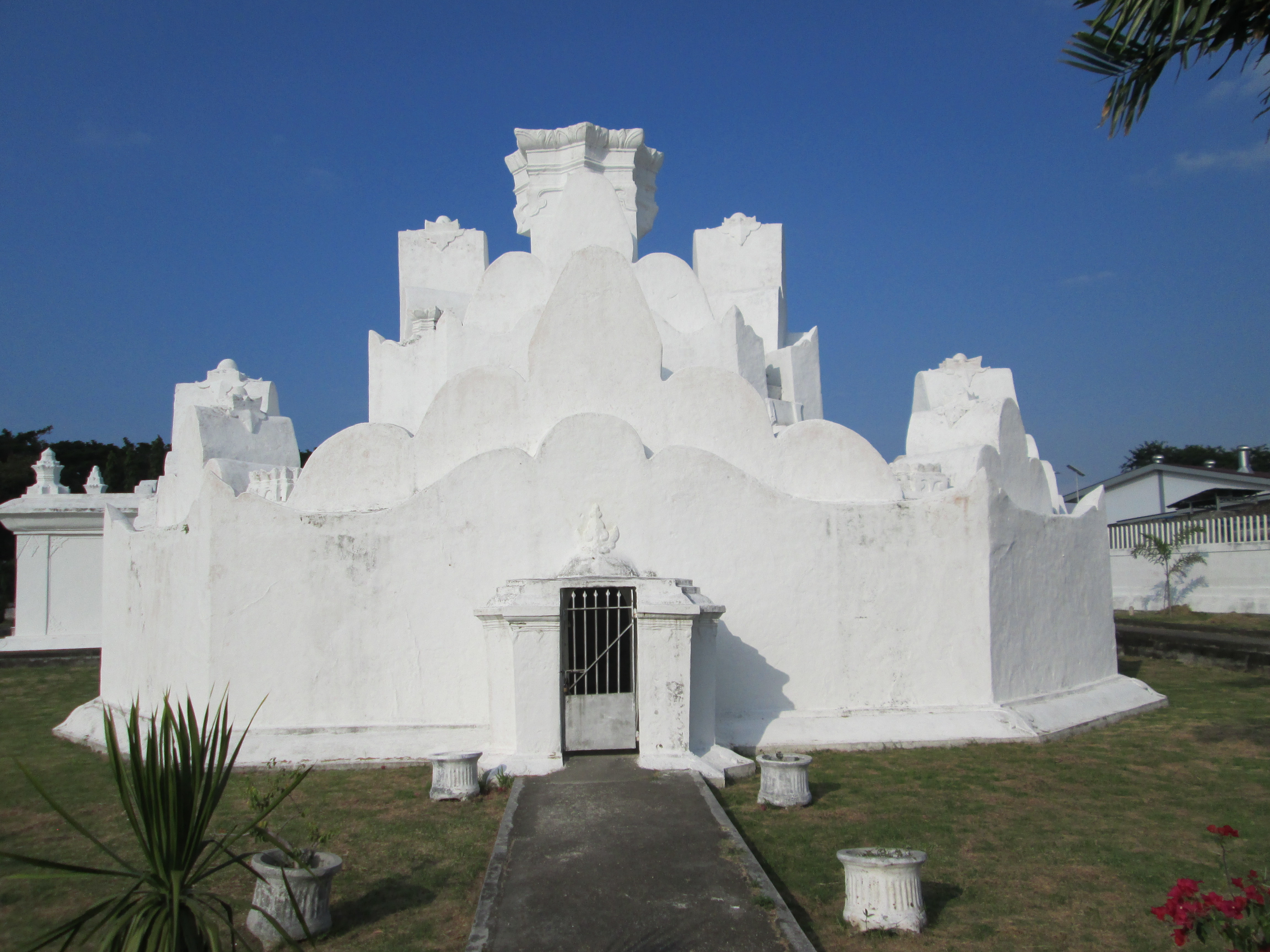
Gunongan

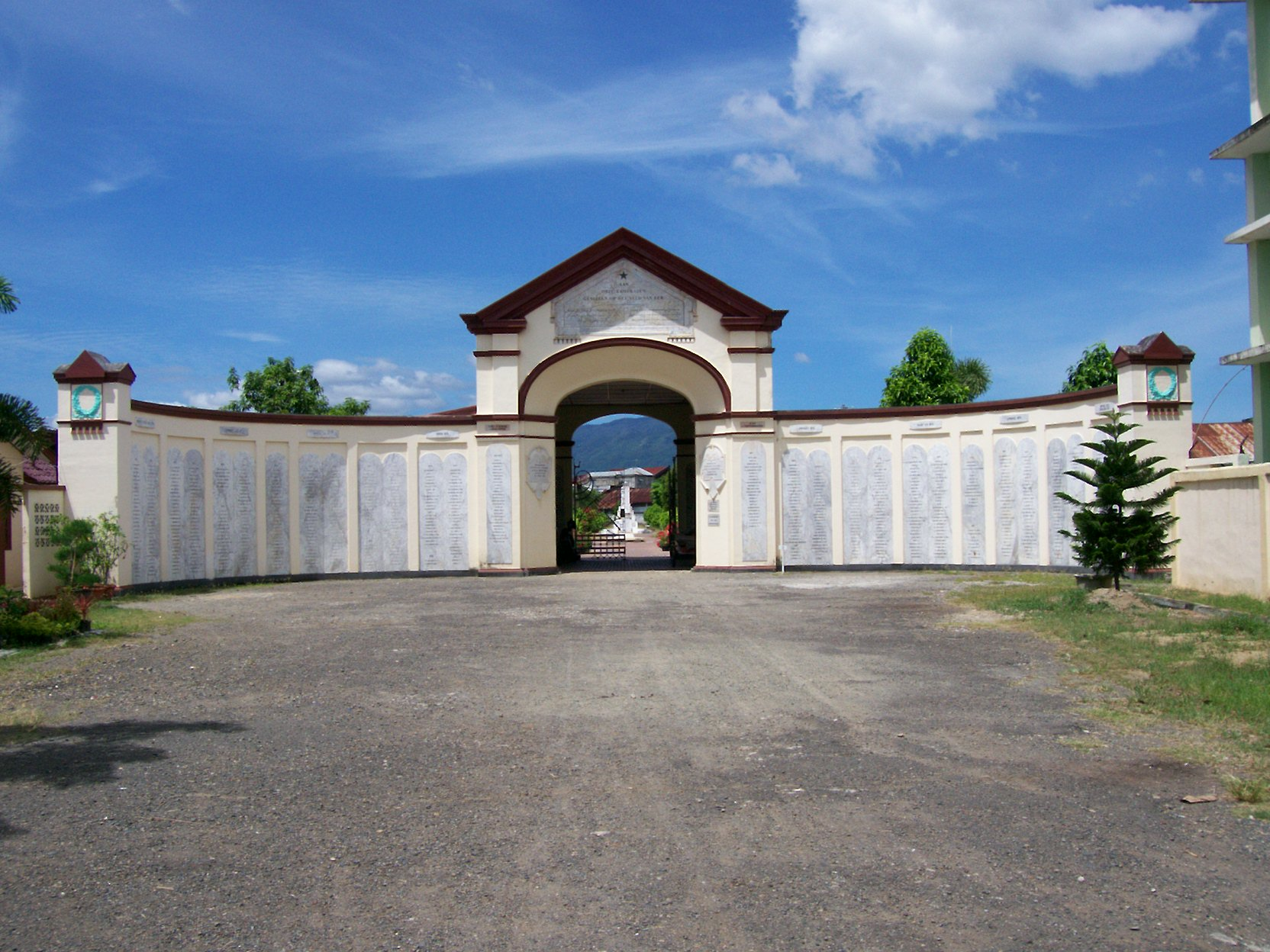
Kerkhoff Poucut entry gate

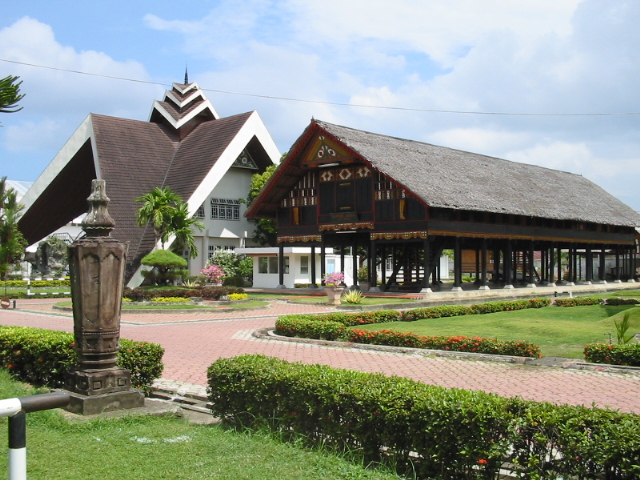
Aceh Museum

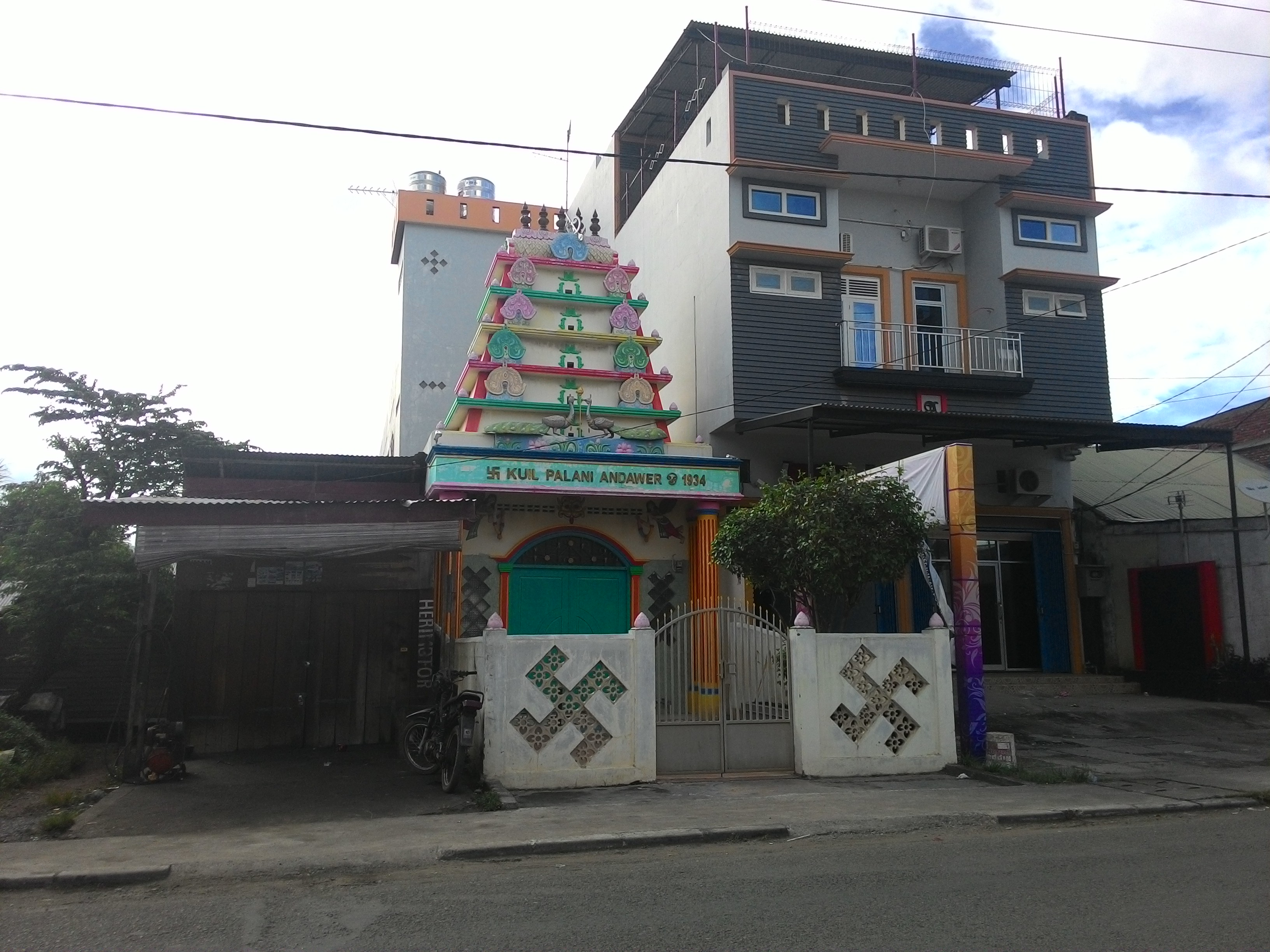
Palani Andawer Temple

- The Baiturrahman Grand Mosque was originally built during the sultanate of Iskandar Muda (1607–1636). It was rebuilt in 1875 after it was burnt down in the Aceh war. It has seven domes and four smaller towers along with the main tower. The mosque can accommodate up to 9,000 people.
- Gunongan Historical Park is a private playground and bathing place, built by Sultan Iskandar Muda, dedicated to his wife Putroe Phang. Gunongan was part of royal garden complex Taman Sari.
- A number of places near the center of Banda Aceh have been established as memorials of the Indian Ocean tsunami on the city in 2004. These include several mass burial centers such as the graves at Ulee Lheue, places where boats were carried several kilometers inland by the tsunami (PLTD Apung 1, or the "Floating Diesel Plant", and the "Floating Boat on the Roof"), and the Tsunami Museum. The PLTD Apung 1 had been located near the Ule Lheu beach before being shifted close to the city center by the tsunami. It has become one of the most important landmarks in Banda Aceh.
- Dutch Kerkhof Poucut Cemetery is a Dutch military burial ground located near the center of Banda Aceh, next to the tsunami museum. The cemetery name is a combination of Kerkhof (Dutch for churchyard or graveyard) and poucut or poteu cut (Acehnese for prince). The Kerkhoff Poucut is recorded as the largest Dutch military cemetery outside the Netherlands. There are around 2,200 graves of white Dutch soldiers as well as recruits from Ambon, Manado and Java, and several Dutch generals.
- The Aceh Museum is one of the oldest museums in Indonesia. The original museum was established almost 100 years ago, and it was established in 1915, after Independence in 1945, the museum became the property of the regional government. In 1969 the museum was moved from the original site at Blang Padang to the current location in Jl. Sultan Alaiddin Mahmudsyah. The museum contains a wide range of artifacts relating to the history and cultural life of Aceh.
- The Kuil Palani Andawer is Aceh's oldest and only Hindu temple located particularly in Banda Aceh. In 2004, eventually the temple was devastated and collapsed by the 2004 Indian Ocean tsunami striking Banda Aceh, however the temple was reconstructed and restored with the help of Hindu communities from Malaysia and India in 2012.

Several festivals are held annually by the city:

- Banda Aceh Festival
- Festival Krueng Aceh Peunayong
- Festival Geulayang Tunang (kite festival)
- Festival Kupi
- Indonesia City Expo
- Thaipusam.

There are three beaches close to Banda Aceh which can be reached by car or motorcycle: Ujông Batèë Beach, Lhôk Nga Beach, and Lam Pu'uk Beach, which is the most developed of the three.

== Transportation ==
Motorized becaks are common in Banda Aceh. Transport by taxis and minibuses, known as labi-labi, are also common. Since 2018, some online transportation is also available like Grab and Gojek. Online transportation can only be available outside of the airport, not like the other airports like Jakarta, Surabaya.

Sultan Iskandar Muda International Airport is located in Blang Bintang, 13.5 km (8.4 mi) from Banda Aceh.

Two main highways run from Banda Aceh to the south. One runs down the eastern side of the province through main towns such as Bireuen and Lhokseumawe to Medan, the large capital of the province of North Sumatra. The other highway runs down the western side of the province, through lesser-populated areas, to the towns of Calang, Meulaboh, and Singkil. The main bus station, Terminal Terpadu Batoh, is located at Jalan Mr. Teuku Muhammad Hasan. Banda Aceh-Sigli Toll Road, part of Trans-Sumatra Toll Road, is currently under construction; it is located at the tip of the toll road and connected with Sultan Iskandar Muda Airport.

Banda Aceh has two seaports, Pelabuhan (port) Ulèë Lheuë and Pelabuhan Malahayati. Pelabuhan Ulèë Lheuë was formerly the main sea port in Aceh. It now functions as a ferry terminal. It is located in the Meuraksa area. Pelabuhan Malahayati, the current main sea port, is located in Krueng Raya, 27 km (17 mi) from Banda Aceh. It now functions as the main freight cargo terminal.

Since May 2016, Banda Aceh has had a bus rapid transit system, called Trans Koetaradja. Initially, Trans Koetaradja ran only a single line Keudah – Darussalam (vv) (Corridor I), which operates from 06:30–18:36 on Monday-Saturday and 07:20–17:20 on Sunday and Holidays. Since 2017, it has added 2 additional lines: Corridor II-A with route Sultan Iskandar Muda International Airport – Pasar Aceh (vv) and operates from 08:00–18:20 every day; and Corridor II-B with route Pelabuhan Ulèë Lheuë (Port) – Pasar Aceh (vv) and operates from 07:00–18:35 every day. From 2016 until 2018, thanks to subsidies from Aceh government, it was a free-of-charge transportation for passengers.

== Sport ==
=== Sport complex ===
Lapangan Blang Padang is a multi-use park located in the center of Banda Aceh and has become a location for citizen sports activities for decades. It has jogging track, volleyball court, football pitch, basketball court, and food courts, as well. There is a famous replica of RI 001, the first Indonesian plane, at Lapangan Blang Padang.

Some other sport complexes in Banda Aceh are: Lapangan Neusu, Komplek Harapan Bangsa, Lapangan Gelanggang Unsyiah, and Lapangan Tugu

=== Indoor sport hall ===
In Banda Aceh, there are several indoor sport halls (id: Gelanggang Olah Raga, abbreviated as GOR) which previously hosted as a venue for multiple sports: GOR KONI, GOR Dista, GOR Pango and GOR A. Madjid Ibrahim Unsyiah.

=== Football ===
The city has two major football stadiums:

- Harapan Bangsa Stadium (seating capacity: 45,000)
- H. Dimurthala Stadium (seating capacity: 20,000), which is the homeground of Persiraja Banda Aceh and Kuala Nanggroe F.C.

In addition, there are also several small capacity stadia in the city, including Syiah Kuala University Stadium and Lambhuk Mini Stadium.

== Education ==
As claimed by the Central Agency of Statistics of Indonesia, Banda Aceh had the longest average length of schooling within the Aceh province, achieving 13.37 years as of 2025.

=== Universities ===
Banda Aceh is a hub to various higher education institutions inside Aceh, having a total of 29 registered private universities with along 1 public university. These universities include:

- Syiah Kuala University
- University of Abulyatama

== Media ==
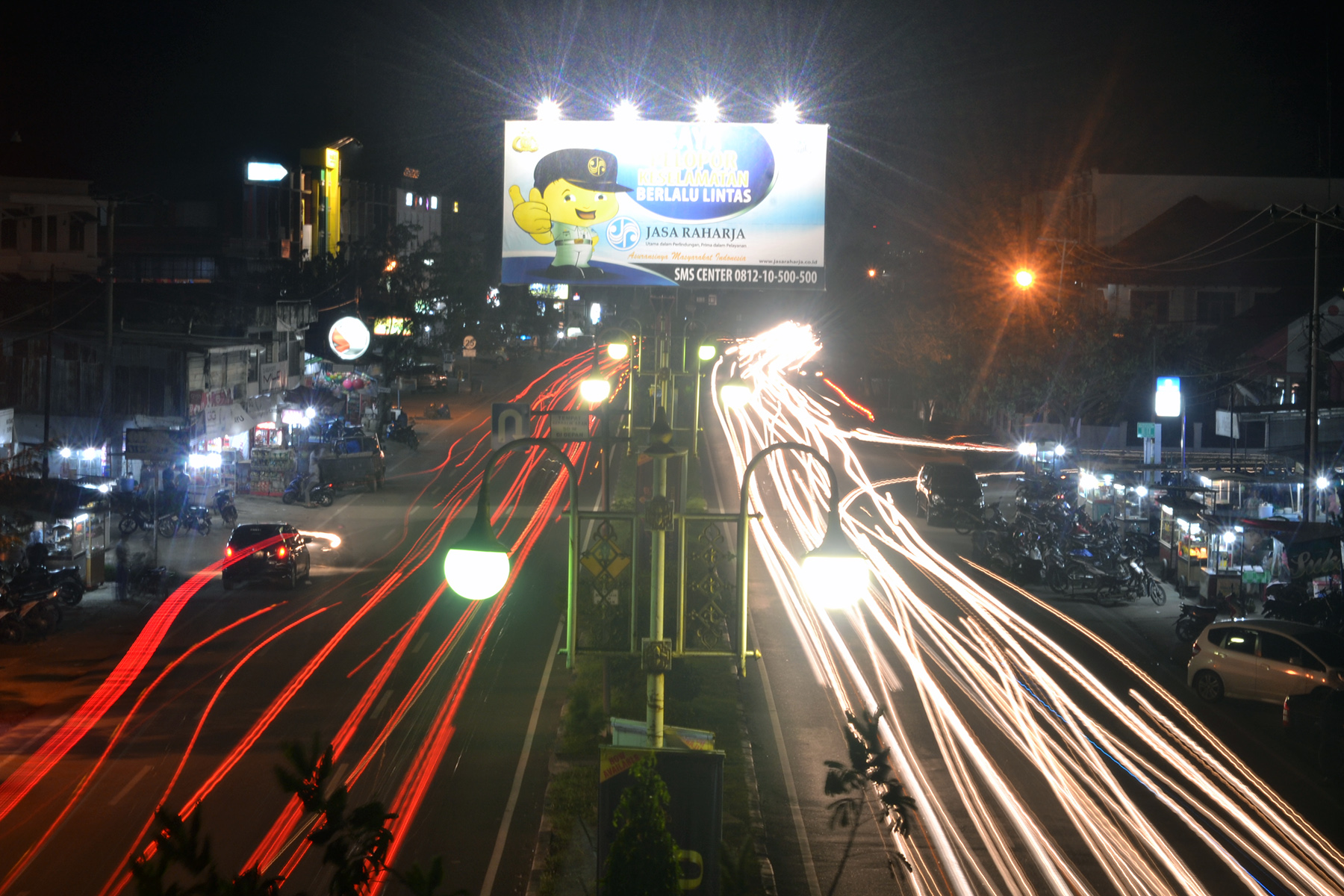
Banda Aceh at night

The oldest newspaper in the Banda Aceh region is Serambi Indonesia, part of Tribun Network. Several other newspapers such as Harian Aceh, Rakyat Aceh and ProHaba are also available.

The privately owned Kutaraja TV and Aceh TV are the local TV stations based in Banda Aceh. The public TVRI Aceh is also covered the city, though its studios are located in nearby Aceh Besar.

== Sister cities ==
- Samarkand, Uzbekistan
- Higashimatsushima, Japan

== Bibliography ==
- Dallal, Tamalyn. 40 Days & 1001 Nights: One Woman's Dance Through Life in the Islamic World..., 2007. ISBN 0-9795155-0-5 (book). The first part of the journey through the Islamic world goes through Banda Aceh and describes the everyday life of the people in this part of Indonesia.
