= Illiza Sa'aduddin Djamal =

Indonesian politician (born 1973)

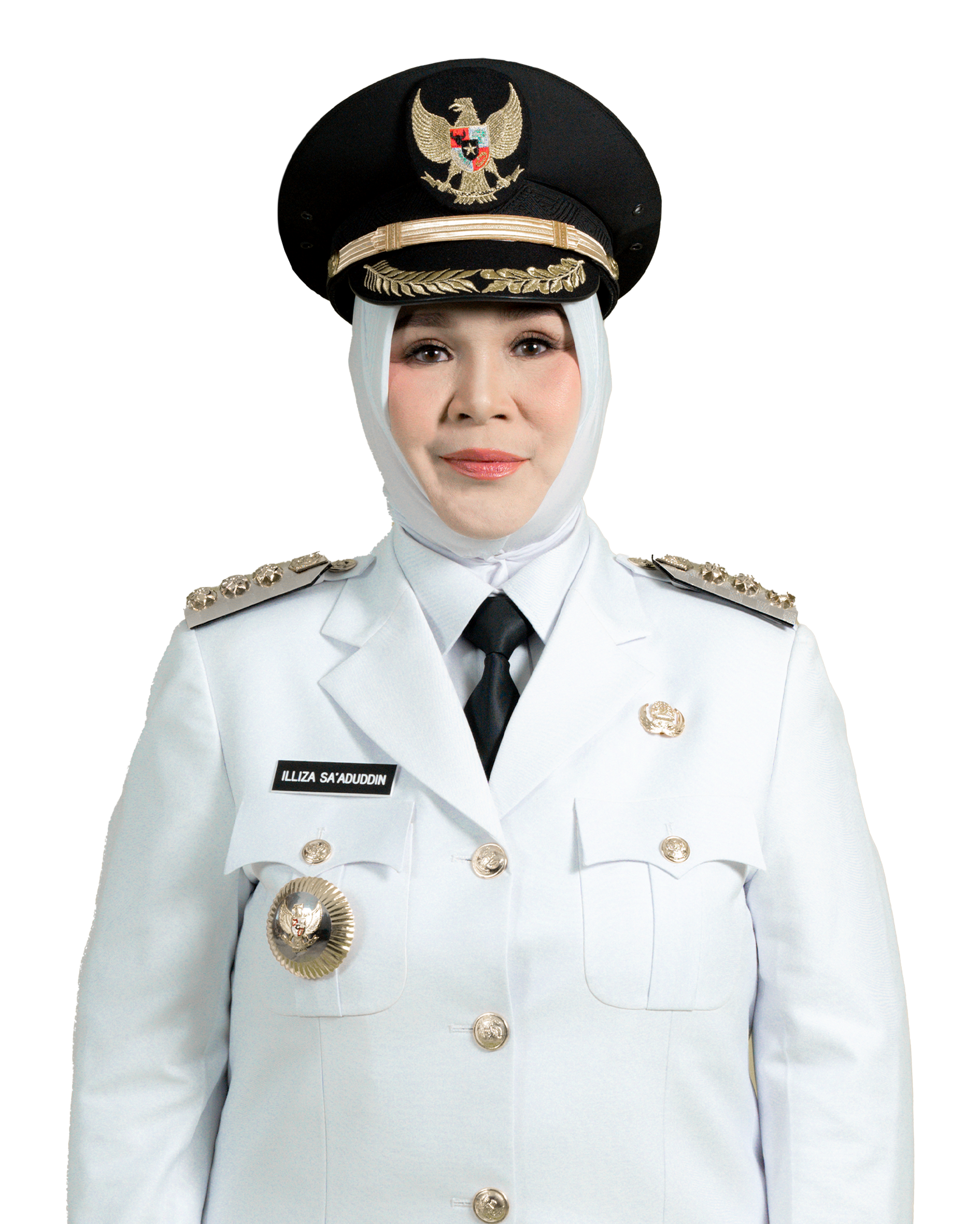
- Official portrait, 2025

11th and 13th Mayor of Banda Aceh
- Incumbent
- Assumed office 12 February 2025
- Governor: Muzakir Manaf
- Vice Mayor: Afdhal Khalilullah
- Preceded by: Almuniza Kamal (acting)
- In office 16 June 2014 – 7 July 2017 acting: 17 February 2014 – 16 June 2014
- Governor: Zaini Abdullah
- Vice Mayor: Zainal Arifin
- Preceded by: Mawardy Nurdin
- Succeeded by: Aminullah Usman

Member of the House of Representatives
- In office 1 October 2019 – 1 October 2024
- Parliamentary group: United Development Party Faction
- Constituency: Aceh I

1st Vice Mayor of Banda Aceh
- In office 19 February 2007 – 17 February 2014
- Governor: Irwandi Yusuf; Zaini Abdullah
- Mayor: Mawardy Nurdin
- Preceded by: Office established
- Succeeded by: Vacant

Personal details
- Born: Illiza Sa'aduddin Djamal; 31 December 1973 (age 52) Banda Aceh, Aceh, Indonesia
- Party: PPP
- Other political affiliations: KIM Plus (2024–present)
- Spouse: Amir Ridha
- Occupation: Politician

Illiza Sa'aduddin Djamal (born 31 December 1973) is an Indonesian politician who is the 12th mayor of Banda Aceh, and formerly member of the House of Representatives (DPR) of the Republic of Indonesia from 2019 to 2024. A member of the United Development Party (PPP), she served as the 11th mayor from 2014 to 2017. She was again elected mayor in 2024.

== Education ==
Illiza obtained her early education from Madrasah Ibtidaiyah Negeri (MIN) Banda Aceh in 1985; MTsN III PP Jakarta in 1988; Sekolah Menengah Atas Negeri Banda Aceh in 1991; and Sekolah Tinggi Ilmu Manajemen in 2006.

== Career ==
=== Early career ===
From 2004 to 2006, Illiza was a member in the Regional People's Representative Council (DPRD) of Banda Aceh. Following that, she was appointed Banda Aceh's Deputy Mayor, serving in tandem with Mawardy Nurdin from 2007 to 2014. Following the inauguration, Illiza made a statement in which she urged the officials to follow Islamic teachings and show more obedience to the leadership. She immediately climbed to the position of mayor of Banda Aceh on 16 June 2014 until 7 July 2017. Illiza, who emphasizes religious values, has been able to draw the attention of the people of Banda Aceh due to the political image she has created through the implementation of Islamic Sharia.

=== Political career ===
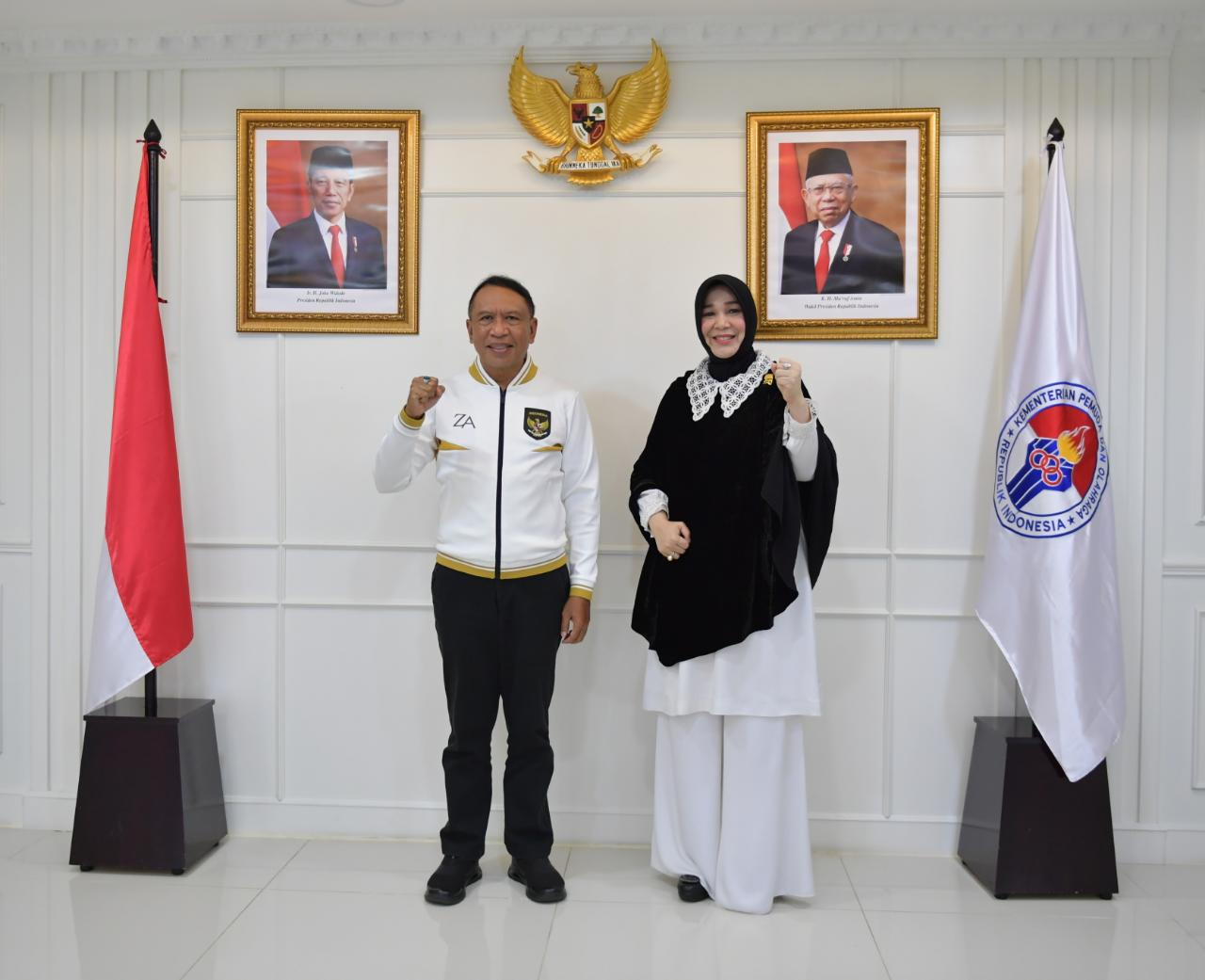
Minister Zainudin Amali and Illiza during a meeting in Jakarta, 2022

Located in the South Aceh Regent's Hall, Illiza began her professional visits to the regency on 5 August 2021, she expressed her desire that the South Aceh Regency Government would implement educational initiatives, such as scholarships to students who want to further their studies in the Middle East and other regions.

According to Illiza, she informed Zainudin Amali about the initiatives, announcing that a National Conference will be held and that her management term will shortly come to an end. Aside from that, she wishes that the National Sports Grand Design (DBON), which is now governed by Law Number 11 of 2022 concerning Sports, can be implemented by the upcoming administration.

Illiza stated on 23 June 2023, that the Village Law modification would enhance communal welfare. One way to do this is by giving local officials more authority and allocating cash up to twice as much. She continued by saying that her party is advocating for a 15% increase in village fund allocations from the Regional Revenue and Expenditure Budget (APBD) and a 15% rise from regional transfer special allocation funds.

=== Lawsuit ===
At the District Court, Illiza was sued and was required to pay IDR 14 billion in compensation in the lawsuit. Sayed Hasan is a resident of Banda Aceh and the complainant. When Sayed was still the mayor of Banda Aceh ten years ago, she filed a lawsuit because she did not agree with what was said. She added that the litigation was an old matter from perhaps ten years ago. According to her, when the situation arose in February 2013, she wanted to arbitrate between Sayed Hasan and the Kampung Jawa residents in her capacity as Mayor of Banda Aceh, along with representatives from Forkopimda Banda Aceh and the District Muspika.

== Electoral history ==
Election	Legislative institution	Constituency	Political party	Votes	Results
2019	People's Representative Council of the Republic of Indonesia	Aceh I	United Development Party	31,964	Elected
