= Campus Dakwah Institute =

Islamic organization based in Indonesia

Campus Dakwah Institute (Lembaga Dakwah Kampus, often abbreviated as LDK) is a collective term for a student organization in Indonesia aimed as a union for Muslim campus students as well as medium for proselytization of Islam (dawah). Most universities in Indonesia have their own LDK. In each campus, LDK can be different in its organization, in which different names are often employed, including Unit Kegiatan Mahasiswa Islam (Islamic Student Activity Unit), Kerohanian Islam (Islamic Spirituality), Forum Studi Islam (Islamic Studies Forum), and Badan Kerohanian Islam (Islamic Spiritual Body).

== History ==
LDK emerged during the 1980s as a body for the propagation of Islam at the universities, principally targeting students and the affiliates of academia, demographics which considered to be the strategic subjects for the societal changes from the perspective of their roles in the society. Its development can be traced back to the Soeharto regime's refusal of Masyumi Party's political participation, and the subsequent establishment of Dewan Dakwah Islamiyah Indonesia (DDII), an organization dedicated to Islamic propagation, by the former leader of Masyumi Party Mohammad Natsir. Penetration of DDII into the university campuses, primarily elite secular universities such as Bandung Institute of Technology (ITB), University of Indonesia (UI), Bogor Agricultural University (IPB) and Gadjah Mada University (UGM) had initiated the formulation of LDK, with Jama'ah Shalahuddin of UGM was established as early as 1976. Through the course of the history of Islam in Indonesia, LDK has been considered an indirect source of the rapid development of Islam in the country in the late 20th century.

== Interorganizational system ==
There are a number of inter-campus organization of LDKs, such as Indonesia Hospitality Forum of Campus Dakwah Institute (FSLDK Indonesia) and Coordinating Board of Campus Dakwah Institute (BKLDK).

=== FSLDK ===
Indonesia Hospitality Forum of Campus Dakwah Institute Forum Silaturrahmi Lembaga Dakwah Kampus Indonesia
- Abbreviation: FSLDK
- Type: Student organization
- Legal status: Active
- Purpose: Islamic propagation
- Official language: Bahasa Indonesia
- Website: http://fsldk.id

LDK Hospitality Forum (FSLDK or FSLDK Indonesia) is an open forum for the LDK members to discuss the meta-issues regarding each of the LDK chapters. FSLDK, linking universities in Indonesia is open for every LDK member and they are entitled to join the group. The network is widespread throughout the archipelago, similarly to LDK. Currently, the membership counts 860. At the national level, there is FSLDKN, which operates as a directorial administration of the FSLDK throughout the country. FSLDKN aims to discuss the role of LDK in the national and international scope, and responsible for managing PUSKOMNAS (LDK National Center for Communication). At the regional level, there is FSKDKD which aims at reflecting the direction of FSLDKN, discussing the role of LDK at the local level, and responsible for managing PUSKOMDA (Pusat Komunikasi Daerah, the Central Communication Center). The agenda of FSLDK is increasingly becoming diverse, ranging from the assistance of local LDK chapters, management training, participation at the international symposium to disaster management.
