= Battle of Aceh (1599) =

16th century military engagement in Aceh

Assault on Aceh
- Part of Acehnese–Dutch conflict
Date	11 September 1599
Location	Near Banda Aceh, Aceh Sultanate
Result	Acehnese victory

Belligerents
(Aceh Sultanate) Sultanate of Aceh	Dutch Republic

Commanders and leaders
(Aceh Sultanate) Alauddin Ri'ayat Syah (Aceh Sultanate) Keumalahayati	(Dutch Republic) Cornelis de Houtman † (Dutch Republic) Frederick de Houtman (POW)

Units involved
Inong Balee	Dutch States Army

In the Battle of Aceh (1599) Malahayati attacked Dutch expeditionary forces led by Cornelis De Houtman to avenge their insults and respond to the arrogance of Cornelis de Houtman. The attacks resulted in the success of Inong Balee forces and the death of de Houtman.

== Background ==
In 1599, Dutch expedition commander Cornelis de Houtman arrived at the port of Aceh. The Sultan met him peacefully until de Houtman insulted him. The Dutchman had clashed with the Banten Sultanate in northwest Java. Upon his arrival in Aceh he hijacked many Aceh ships. Malahayati attacked the Dutch trader's ships by order of Sultan Alauddin Ri'ayat Syah.

== Battle ==
Malahayati led her Inong Balee Army in response to the Dutch challenge and after several violent battles she avenged her husband's death by Dutch forces. On 11 September 1599 the Inong Balee forces attacked and Malahayati successfully expelled the two Dutch ships. Malahayati killed de Houtman in a duel and imprisoned Frederick de Houtman.

== Aftermath ==
After Cornelis got killed by Malahayati, his brother Frederick de Houtman was imprisoned by the Sultan. After this battle, the Inong Balee armies stormed many of the Dutch forts during the Second Dutch Expedition to the East Indies to force the Dutch to sign a treaty.

== Legacy ==
Because of the Acehnese victory in this battle, Malahayati is considered to be the first modern woman admiral.

In November 2017, President Joko Widodo awarded her honorary National Hero of Indonesia.
