= Ingin Jaya, Aceh Besar =

Darul Imarah
- Administrative District of Great Aceh Regency
- Kecamatan Ingin Jaya
- Interactive map of Darul Imarah
- Location of Ingin Jaya in Aceh Darul Imarah (Northern Sumatra) Darul Imarah (Indonesia)
- Coordinates: 5°30′47.9″N 95°19′36.1″E
- Country: Indonesia
- Province: Aceh
- Regency: Aceh Besar Regency
- District seat: Lambaro

Area
  - Total: 24.34 km^{2} (9.40 sq mi)

Population (2024)
  - Total: 37,285
  - Density: 1,532/km^{2} (3,967/sq mi)
- Time zone: UTC+7 (WIT)
- Postcode: 23371
- Calling code: 0651
- Vehicle registration plates: BL

Ingin Jaya is an administrative district (kecamatan) in Aceh Besar Regency, in Aceh Province of Indonesia. This district covers an area of 24.34 square kilometres and had a population of 37,285 people in mid 2024.

== Governance ==
=== Villages ===
Ingin Jaya District, which contains part of the southern suburbs of Banda Aceh city, is divided into six mukims (townships/subdistricts), namely Mukim Pagar Air (13 villages or gampong with 16,902 inhabitants in mid 2024), Mukim Lamteungoh (5 gampong with 4,670 inhabitants), Mukim Lamgarot (7 gampong with 4,324 inhabitants), Mukim Lamjampok (11 gampong with 3,595 inhabitants), Mukim Gani (9 gampong with 4,506 inhabitants) and Mukim Lubok (5 gampong with 3,288 inhabitants), which in total consists of 50 villages (gampong), listed below with their areas and their populations as at mid 2024: Those gampong forming a seventh mukim (Mukim Cot Saluran) are no longer part of the district.

Kode Wilayah	Name of gampong	Name of mukim	Area in km^{2}	Pop'n Estimate mid 2024	No. of hamlets (dusun)
11.06.10.2054	Kayee Lee *	Lamteungoh	1.88	2,390	4
11.06.10.2053	Lamteungoh *	Lamteungoh	0.67	673	3
11.06.10.2011	Lubok Sukon	Lukok	0.41	957	4
11.06.10.2012	Lubok Gapuy	Lubok	0.45	589	4
11.06.10.2049	Lamdaya	Lamjampok	0.32	246	3
11.06.10.2047	Lam Ue	Lamjampok	0.45	289	3
11.06.10.2041	Paleuh Blang	Lamjampok	0.47	465	4
11.06.10.2044	Paleuh Pulo	Lamjampok	0.24	492	4
11.06.10.2050	Lambada	Lamjampok	0.13	521	4
11.06.10.2045	Lamcot	Lamjampok	0.50	364	3
11.06.10.2043	Lampreh Lamjampok	Lamjampok	0.30	283	2
11.06.10.2046	Lam Sinyeu	Lamjampok	0.13	163	
11.06.10.2042	Cot Mentiwan	Lamjampok	0.39	300	3
11.06.10.2021	Cot Alue	Lamjampok	0.61	293	3
11.06.10.2048	Cot Gud	Lamjampok	0.30	179	2
11.06.10.2023	Cot Bada	Gani	0.38	276	3
11.06.10.2022	Cot Suruy	Gani	0.25	642	3
11.06.10.2018	Ajee Cut	Gani	0.50	692	3
11.06.10.2017	Ajee Rayeuk	Gani	0.72	421	3
11.06.10.2010	Dham Pulo	Lubok	0.54	555	2
11.06.10.2013	Pasie Lubuk	Lubok	0.51	430	3
11.06.10.2051	Ujung XII *	Lamteungoh	0.59	292	3
11.06.10.2056	Lampreh Lamteungoh *	Lamteungoh	0.31	667	3
11.06.10.2052	Bada	Lamteungoh	0.47	648	3
11.06.10.2001	Lambaro *	Pagar Air	0.54	1,879	2
11.06.10.2030	Kalut (Meunasah Kalut) *	Pagar Air	0.88	486	3
11.06.10.2032	Meunasah Manyet *	Pagar Air	0.35	944	3
11.06.10.2024	Ajee Pagar Air *	Pagar Air	0.88	1,055	3
11.06.10.2027	Lubok Batee *	Pagar Air	0.42	1,294	3
11.06.10.2007	Siron	Lamgarot	0.41	931	3
11.06.10.2004	Meunasah Baro	Lamgarot	0.49	501	3
11.06.10.2008	Pasie Lamgarot	Lamgarot	0.55	1,103	5
11.06.10.2009	Dham Ceukok	Lubok	0.44	757	4
11.06.10.2019	Gani (Ganee)	Gani	0.86	819	3
11.06.10.2014	Bueng Ceukok	Gani	0.14	286	3
11.06.10.2015	Teubang Phuy	Gani	0.25	383	2
11.06.10.2020	Ateuk Lueng Ie	Gani	0.70	623	3
11.06.10.2016	Ateuk Anggok	Gani	0.40	364	2
11.06.10.2003	Bakoy	Lamgarot	0.82	609	3
11.06.10.2002	Meunasah Manyang Lamgarot	Lamgarot	0.19	405	3
11.06.10.2006	Meunasah Tutong	Lamgarot	0.23	521	3
11.06.10.2005	Meunasah Deyah	Lamgarot	0.43	254	3
11.06.10.2026	Jurong Peujura *	Pagar Air	0.77	1,201	4
11.06.10.2029	Pantee *	Pagar Air	0.26	1,084	4
11.06.10.2028	Bineh Blang *	Pagar Air	0.87	1,524	4
11.06.10.2035	Reuloh *	Pagar Air	0.35	1,903	2
11.06.10.2034	Tanjong *	Pagar Air	0.63	1,751	4
11.06.10.2031	Meunasah Manyang Pasar Air *	Pasar Air	0.37	932	2
11.06.10.2033	Santan *	Pagar Air	0.27	822	2
11.06.10.2025	Meunasah Krueng *	Pagar Air	0.32	2,027	3
	Totals		24.34	37,285	154

Note Kode Wilayah numbers 11.06.10.2036 - 11.06.10.2040 and number 11.06.10.2055 are not allocated. Those 17 gampong marked with an asterisk (*) - comprising all of Mukim Pagar Air and most of Mukim Lamteungoh (except gampong Bada across the river), with 20,924 inhabitants in mid 2024 - are situated on the west bank of the Krueng Aceh River, while the other 33 gampong, with 16,361 inhabitants in mid 2024, are located on the east bank of the river.
