= Mesjid Raya, Aceh Besar =

Mesjid Raya
- Administrative District of Great Aceh Regency
- Kecamatan Mesjid Raya
- Interactive map of Mesjid Raya
- Location of Mesjid Raya in Aceh Mesjid Raya (Northern Sumatra) Mesjid Raya (Indonesia)
- Coordinates: 5°30′47.9″N 95°19′36.1″E
- Country: Indonesia
- Province: Aceh
- Regency: Aceh Besar Regency
- District seat: Meunasah

Area
  - Total: 129.93 km^{2} (50.17 sq mi)

Population (2024)
  - Total: 22,369
  - Density: 172.16/km^{2} (445.90/sq mi)
- Time zone: UTC+7 (WIT)
- Postcode: 23381
- Calling code: 0651
- Vehicle registration plates: BL

Mesjid Raya is an administrative district (kecamatan) in Aceh Besar Regency, in Aceh Province of Indonesia. This district covers an area of 129.93 square kilometres and has a population of 22,369 people in mid 2024.

== Governance ==
=== Villages ===
Mesjid Raya District, which contains part of the far eastern suburbs of Banda Aceh city, is divided into two mukims (townships/subdistricts), namely mukim Lamnga/Neuheun in the west and mukim Krueng Raya in the east. The district in total consists of 13 villages (listed below with their areas and their populations as at mid 2024), in turn sub-divided into 47 hamlets (dusun):

Kode Wilayah	Name of gampong	Name of mukim	Area in km^{2}	Pop'n Estimate mid 2024	No. of hamlets (dusun)
11.06.09.2013	Lamnga	Lamnga/Neuheun	1.37	1,259	4
11.06.09.2010	Gampong Baro	Lamnga/Neuheun	1.43	209	2
11.06.09.2012	Neuheun	Lamnga/Neuheun	6.09	9,152	5
11.06.09.2011	Durung	Lamnga/Neuheun	8.34	1,378	4
11.06.09.2009	Ladong	Lamnga/Neuheun	17.78	2,117	4
11.06.09.2008	Ruyung	Kreung Raya	6.18	843	3
11.06.09.2007	Paya Kameng	Kreung Raya	4.09	504	3
11.06.09.2002	Beurandeh	Kreung Raya	5.64	713	2
11.06.09.2001	Meunasah Kulam	Kreung Raya	9.11	873	4
11.06.09.2004	Meunasah Keudee	Kreung Raya	0.59	1,345	4
11.06.09.2006	Meunbasah Mon	Kreung Raya	6.97	1,587	4
11.06.09.2003	Ie Seu Um	Kreung Raya	22.94	548	3
11.06.09.2005	Lamreh	Kreung Raya	39.40	1,841	5
	Totals		129.93	22,369	47

The district includes Tanjung Dunung, the most northerly point on the Sumatran mainland. Three of the thirteen villages comprising the district lie west of this cape (and thus can be considered as within the Krueng Aceh river valley and the northeast coastal suburbs of Banda Aceh city), these are the gampong of Lamnga, Gampong Baro and Neuheun, with a combined area of 8.89 km^{2} and a population of around 10,620; the other ten gampong (Durung and Ladong, plus the villages comprising mukin Kreung Raya) are situated to the east of the cape, with Keude (Meunasah) and Leupung as their main centres.
