= Krueng Barona Jaya, Aceh Besar =

Krueng Barona Jaya
- Administrative District of Great Aceh Regency
- Kecamatan Krueng Barona Jaya
- Interactive map of Krueng Barona Jaya
- Location of Krueng Barona Jaya in Aceh Krueng Barona Jaya (Northern Sumatra) Krueng Barona Jaya (Indonesia)
- Coordinates: 5°30′47.9″N 95°19′36.1″E
- Country: Indonesia
- Province: Aceh
- Regency: Aceh Besar Regency
- District seat: Cot Iri

Area
  - Total: 6.96 km^{2} (2.69 sq mi)

Population (2025)
  - Total: 19,665
  - Density: 2,830/km^{2} (7,320/sq mi)
- Time zone: UTC+7 (WIT)
- Postcode: 23370
- Calling code: 0651
- Vehicle registration plates: BL

Darul Imarah is an administrative district (kecamatan) in Aceh Besar Regency, in Aceh Province of Indonesia. This district covers an area of 6.96 square kilometres and has a population of 19,661 people in mid 2025.

== Governance ==
=== Villages ===
Krueng Barona Jaya District, which contains part of the southern suburbs of Banda Aceh city, is divided into three mukims (townships/subdistricts), namely Mukim Pango/Cot Iri, Mukim Lam Ujong and Mukim Ulee Kareng, which in total consist of 32 villages, listed below with their areas and their populations as at mid 2024:

Kode Wilayah	Name of gampong	Name of mukim	Area in km^{2}	Pop'n Estimate mid 2024	No. of hamlets (dusun)
11.06.21.2004	Lampermai	Pango	0.66	1,044	3
11.06.21.2006	Miruk	Pango	0.82	2,020	4
11.06.21.2005	Gla Deyah	Cot Iri	0.48	738	4
11.06.21.2012	Gla Meunasah Baro	Cot Iri	0.46	1,220	3
11.06.21.2010	Meunasah Intan	Cot Iri	0.78	1,350	3
11.06.21.2009	Meunasah Baet	Lam Ujong	0.34	1,229	4
11.06.21.2008	Meunasah Manyang	Lam Ujong	0.22	1,105	4
11.06.21.2007	Lamgapang	Lam Ujong	0.25	2,685	4
11.06.21.2011	Rumpet	Lam Ujong	0.56	786	4
11.06.21.2002	Bak Trieng	Ulee Kareng	0.51	1,647	5
11.06.21.2003	Lueng Ie	Ulee Kareng	0.60	1,054	4
11.06.21.2001	Meunasah Papeun	Ulee Kareng	1.28	4,084	4
	Totals		6.96	18,962	46
