= Economy of the Netherlands from 1500–1700 =

The history of the Dutch economy has faced several ups and downs throughout the 16th and 17th centuries. It has undergone moments of prosperity and was one of the dominant world powers in the 17th century. Its heavy involvement in the Atlantic trade had a large impact on its economy and growth. There is no clear definition for the Atlantic trade, but researchers have concluded it may be referred to as: Trade with the New World, and trade with the Asia through the Atlantic, including, but not limited to, imperialism and slavery based undertakings. Among the most important of these traders were the Dutch and the British. It is noted that these two nations experienced a more rapid growth than most due to their non-absolutist political institutions. This is only one of many beneficial factors that played a role in shaping growth and economic change within the Netherlands that occurred throughout the 16th and 17th centuries.

== The rise of Dutch independence ==
The Dutch success in trade did not come without struggle and conflict. Studies show that the Dutch had several qualities that afforded their trade system to rise above other European states' throughout the duration of Atlantic trade. Dutch merchants have always had access and opportunities providing a gateway to profitable trade. They also obtained autonomy. Before the Dutch Revolt, the Dutch were under the control of the Habsburg Empire which limited the power of Dutch merchants and their influence on trade. The Empire had control and tried to gain even more over the fiscal revenues from the Netherlands. Conflict amongst the merchants and the empire began to grow and independence and new political institutions were the result.

During the Revolt, Dutch trade was revolutionized, and the 15th century marked a considerable expansion of the Dutch economy. Several important modifications were made to both the military and commercial strategies. Before long, the Dutch had gained access to Asian and American trade centers. Leading this drive to independence were merchants. Throughout this time the Dutch experienced growth in economic industries such as agriculture, shipping, and public finance. In 1590, the beginning of divergence between the South and North of Europe began to be noticeable, as well as the explosion of Dutch commerce and the early stages of Amsterdam growing as a large financial center. The growing Atlantic trade was edging out the once profitable Baltic route. With trade growing along this route and specialization prospering, the Dutch were ultimately victorious in their pursuits against the Habsburgs.

Israel states:

From 1590, there was a dramatic improvement in the Republic's economic circumstances. Commerce and shipping expanded enormously, as did the towns. As a result, the financial power of the states rapidly grew, and it was possible to improve the army vastly, both qualitatively, and quantitatively, within a short space of time. The army increased from 20,000 men in 1588 to 32,000 by 1595, and its artillery, methods of transportation, and training were transformed. By 1629, the Dutch were able to field an army of 77,000 men, 50 percent larger than the Spanish army of Flanders″

The Dutch prospered immensely during this time. The leading benefactor of this growth was trade and the means of which they manifested it.

They did so particularly through conflict and specialization. Now we see the importance of competitive goods, the Dutch traded what was in demand and the strategy proved to be very favorable for them. They were long distance tradesmen and had some breathing space as far as trade regulations went, which also contributed to their growth. This is in comparison with the previous Habsburg restrictions. In his article, Acemuglu uses this evidence to prove that Atlantic trade led to the enrichment of merchants, which resulted in the development of political institutions. Said institutions are responsible for constraining the power of the crown.

== War and conflict ==
The Eighty Years' War also goes by the name: ‘The War of Dutch Independence’ (1568-1648). The war was a spurred by a revolt of the seventeen provinces within the Habsburg Empire. Philip II of Spain was leading the Habsburgs in the initial stages of the war. The war began due to high taxation within the Netherland regions. William of Orange, who had been exiled from the empire, led the revolting provinces to their first leg of success in the long war. Through the Dutch resistance and revolt, they had achieved the status of The Republic of the Seven United Netherlands in 1581 This declaration entered the Dutch and Habsburgs into a twelve-year truce, only to be disrupted once more by the start of a new war in 1619. The Thirty Years' War is known as one of the bloodiest wars in European history. It translated into a war of religions. It can also be recognized as a series of conflicts between feudalism and early capitalism (Evan, 2014: 36). The war ended with the Peace of Westphalia. The treated formally recognized the Dutch as an independent republic.

=== Fall of Antwerp ===
Antwerp was seized during the Eighty Wars' War from 1584 to 1585. Of the Seventeen Provinces and Northwestern Europe, Antwerp was the economic and financial center of these locations. Antwerp eventually became heavily involved in the rebellion against the Spanish Habsburgs. Ultimately, the city joined became the 'capital' of the Dutch Revolt. This status became official once they joined the Union of Utrecht in 1579. The Spanish held their ground against the defensive Dutch and because of their cannons and strong troops they proved to be successful in their siege of the land. Antwerp's Protestant population was forced to relocate or migrate from their once homeland. Many of the skilled craftsmen and merchants migrated northbound to ultimately provide the foundation for Dutch trade expansion and growth. Their new home formally became The United Provinces of the Netherlands or as previously mentioned: The Dutch Republic. Antwerp was also the home of the Shelde River Estuary Port. When the Spanish captured this port, it became a turning point in the war. Prior to the Fall of Antwerp, Portuguese had been sending gold, ivory, sugar, and other products from the Atlantic to the main port in Antwerp.

== Dutch trade specialization: competitive goods ==
The United Provinces of the Netherlands were growing quickly when the truce was established. Their colonies spanned across five continents and their growth can be considered as what was ‘a new type of global trade and the formation of the world economy.’ The Dutch trade differed from its rivals in many ways. They paid close attention to the relation between risk and profit. If the potential profit was greater than the imposed risk, they were willing (and managed to) trade with their wartime enemies. The middle class played a key role also; they had a large amount of capital accrued within. Due to the Netherlands deficiency in mineral affluence, they had to find another source of profit. They began specializing in competitive goods. Competitive goods are defined as: A production of goods that are not dependent on a particular climate, deposits, and can be produced anywhere in the world. These goods included, but were not limited to: Scandinavian wood, means for shipbuilding, iron, copper, wheat, rye, North Sea Fish, and English wool. The Dutch faced the pressure of competition with several growing competitors. The Dutch focused on their growing agriculture, their domination in continental trade markets, and their widely praised skills as seafarers.

== 16th century Dutch economy ==
Fishing and agriculture shaped the economy of the Dutch in the 15th and 16th centuries. In the early 15th century, Antwerp in modern-day Belgium was the commercial capital of Northern Europe. The Dutch Revolt against Spanish Habsburgs had a large impact on the Fall of Antwerp in 1585. Those who inhabited those lands were in need of a new home that offered security. These peoples included merchants and Calvinist craftsmen. They eventually went to the Northern Netherlands. Holland and Zeeland were growing in population. These two provinces were also heavily involved in maritime operations and productions. For most of the 16th century, these lands were considered more rural than those of the southern Netherlands. They focused on slaughter cattle as a large means of trade.

At the end of the 16th century the Dutch had vastly expanded their maritime explorations. They spanned to Asia, the Mediterranean, and across the Atlantic. The Dutch were making their way to become a major world power. In 1595, Dutch voyages to Asia began with Cornelis de Houtman. The night before his voyage began, the Dutch had already established four trading networks within the Transatlantic. These networks included Spain with Spanish America and Portugal with their Brazilian colonial holding.

== Transition to trade of non-competitive goods ==
Non-competitive goods are referred to as: goods that are produced in only one spot. Non-competitive goods include: sugar and tobacco from the Caribbean, tea, pepper, camphor, spices, sandalwood and teak wood from Southeast Asia, cinnamon and cloves from Ceylon, and Chinese and Japanese porcelain and silk. The Netherlands were becoming a melting pot for religious acceptation and variation. The goods they produced were affected by the religions of those who had migrated into their lands. The Dutch were able to overcome their Portuguese rival by manifesting such effort into the trade of these particular goods.

Some historians argue that sugar acted as the product that drove the expansion into the Atlantic by the Dutch. This trade pressured the Dutch to gain access to Brazil from South America. In 1585, Philip II gave permission to Dutch rebels to take ships to Brazil in order to conduct business as a favor to Spanish Merchants. They originally sent three ships. A few years later, 14 Dutch ships continued sailing to Brazil, carrying cargo for these Spanish merchants. In between times of war, these ships frequently had to stop at a neutral country mid-trip and adopt a new nationality for the time being. By the late of the 1590s, approximately eighteen Dutch ships had gained access to Brazil. These ships would bring back mostly sugar, but also Brazilian wood, cotton, and ginger.

== 17th century Dutch trade ==
A truce that occurred amongst the Dutch Republic and Spain in 1609 opened up trade access to the Mediterranean to the Dutch. This was the first time Dutch ships had gained such access since they had entered into trade with Asia. The Dutch East India Company was established in 1602. It is also referred to as the VOC. This company was a crucial tool used to control Dutch colonial and commercial trade affairs. Investors within the company were granted an allotted percentage of profits depending on the sum of the capital invested. With the help of this company, the Dutch expanded their occupation to Cape Town, Ceylon, and Malacca. They also established posts for trading in the latter two places. VOC imports into Europe consisted largely of spices, tea, coffee, drugs, perfumes, dyestuffs, sugar, and saltpeter. Half to two-thirds of the worth of Asian goods imported into Europe were accounted for in Dutch exports of precious metals. It wasn’t long before other nations caught onto this business and followed the Dutch trend. In the beginning of the 17th century, a round-trip from Europe to the East Indies during this time cost between thirty and thirty-two Euros per ton. Halfway through the 17th century, though, prices dropped to between sixteen and twenty-three euros per ton. The fall in price was due to the Dutch having to deal with Asian revolts in their local waters, building forts, conferring agreements, displaying the flag, and often keeping away their fellow European competitors. All of these conflicts occurred leading up to 1640. In the time following, the Dutch East India Company developed a smaller fleet of ships to deal with these problems.

During the truce, the Dutch also began producing their own tobacco. They had originally 'bartered' with the Indians for tobacco, but after they expanded to the West Indies they began to produce their own. Before long, the Dutch were on par with the Spaniards in terms of how much tobacco they made. This product trade also established Dutch connections with Virginia. A huge segment of trade of Virginia tobacco fell into the Dutch realm. At the beginning of the 17th century, the center of Northern European tobacco trade was located in Zeeland.

Still in the midst of the Thirty Years War, Philip III attempted to prevent the Dutch from furthering their growth into the West and East Indies. He did so by offering peace and independence in exchange. They declined, though, as they had already manifested a great deal of investors in the Dutch East India Company. In 1621, The Dutch West India Company was founded. This Company’s focus was primarily on trade with Latin America and Africa. The Dutch were prospering like never before from their newfound commerce and enterprise. The 17th century was a time that the Dutch had experienced what was the highest standard of living in all of Europe. Their overseas trade within their two companies had afforded them to become the largest naval fleet in the world. This fleet was the means for the Dutch to patrol and dominate long-term trade routes. The fleet also allowed their colonial provisions and power to grow even further. Despite potential setbacks that fighting with the Portuguese could have caused the Dutch were successful in these battles in several aspects. They gained control over more territories in Southeast Asia. They included: Sumatra, Java, Malay Peninsula, southern region of Borneo, and the islands of the Moluccas and West New Guinea. They even expanded as far as a settlement in Australia; however it did not last due to lack of economic profit. The Dutch were so profit-focused that they even exchanged New Amsterdam for Archipelago with Britain. The small island in Moluccas was home to a large stock of spices.

== Anglo-Dutch conflict in the 17th century ==
Relations with the English took a turn for the worse in the late 17th century. In 1661, the English passed the Navigation Acts in order to prevent its colonies from trading with overseas merchants and/or vessels. This act was arguably passed as an offensive move towards the Dutch due to their triumph in global commerce. The passing of this act resulted in three separate Anglo-Dutch wars throughout 1652-1675. The first war lasted throughout 1652-1654. The English won this war and took with them 1,000 Dutch merchant ships. The second of these wars was a result of two incidents. The first occurred when the English captured two Dutch posts located in West Africa and the latter incident being the taking of New Amsterdam. This was a rather detrimental war to both sides and ended due to exhaustion of materials and power. The war concluded, though, and both sides claimed victory in this war that lasted from 1664 to 1674. During the third Anglo-Dutch War, the English gave support to the French to invade the Dutch. Due to common concern in waging war with the Dutch, both the French and the English signed the Treaty of Dover. The Dutch had since allied with the Spanish (Nelson-Burns). The war resulted in the defeat of the Dutch. The Dutch were forced to retreat from southern trade and the English ultimately gained their losses.

== Competing nations ==
The Dutch had competed in trade industries with the English, and later British, for a very long time. By the 18th century, the British had begun to catch up due to their mercantilist ideologies and practices. The fourth Anglo-Dutch war proved to be crucial in the downfall of the Dutch during their prosperous trading time. The British had sustained a blockade that proved to be impenetrable by the Dutch. Trading had come to a halt. Britain was on the verge of an Industrial Revolution and close to finally beating out its long time European competitors. Trade within the VOC was immensely affected by the loss of the Dutch in this war and they had maintained large amounts of public debts also. The company was of great importance to the Dutch and it was kept alive by the emergency aid coming from the States of Holland.
