= Lhong =

District in Aceh, Indonesia

- District
- Interactive map of Lhong
- Location Lhong (Indonesia)
- Coordinates: 5°13′40.5343″N 95°16′13.4987″E
- Country: Indonesia
- Province: Aceh
- Regency: Aceh Besar Regency

Area
  - Total: 149.03 km^{2} (57.54 sq mi)

Population (mid 2023)
  - Total: 10,444
  - Density: 70.080/km^{2} (181.51/sq mi)
- Time zone: UTC+07:00 (WIT)
- Postal code: 23354
- Regional code: 11.06.01
- Villages: 28

Lhoong also known as Lhong is a district in Aceh Besar Regency, Aceh, Indonesia. The district covers an area of 149.03 km^{2}, and had a population of 10,444 at the mid 2023.

== Geography ==
=== Mukims and villages ===
There are four mukims (townships/subdistricts) in Lhoong, which are Mukim Blang Mee, Mukim Cot Jeumpa, Mukim Glee Bruek and Mukim Lhoong with 28 villages (gampong):

- Baroh Blang Mee
- Baroh Geunteut (Baroh Genteut)
- Baroh Krueng Kala
- Birek
- Cundien (Cundin)
- Gapuy
- Glee Bruek
- Jantang
- Kareung
- Keutapang
- Lam Juhang
- Lamgeuriheu (Lam Griheu)
- Lamkuta Blang Mee (Lam Kuta Blang Mee)
- Lamsujen (Lam Sujen)
- Meunasah Cot
- Meunasah Krueng Kala
- Meunasah Lhok
- Mon Mata
- Paroy
- Pasi (Pasie)
- Pudeng
- Saney
- Sungko Mulat (Sengko Meulat)
- Teungoh Blang Mee
- Teungoh Geunteut
- Tunong Krueng Kala
- Umong Seuribee (Umong Seurebee)
- Utamong
