= Darul Imarah =

- Administrative District of Great Aceh Regency
- Kecamatan Darul Imarah
- Interactive map of Darul Imarah
- Location of Darul Imarah in Aceh Darul Imarah (Northern Sumatra) Darul Imarah (Indonesia)
- Coordinates: 5°30′47.9″N 95°19′36.1″E
- Country: Indonesia
- Province: Aceh
- Regency: Aceh Besar Regency
- District seat: Lampeuneurut

Area
  - Total: 24.35 km^{2} (9.40 sq mi)

Population (2024)
  - Total: 59,602
  - Density: 2,448/km^{2} (6,340/sq mi)
- Time zone: UTC+7 (WIT)
- Postcode: 23352
- Calling code: 0651
- Vehicle registration plates: BL

Darul Imarah is an administrative district (kecamatan) in Aceh Besar Regency, in Aceh Province of Indonesia. This district covers an area of 24.35 square kilometres and has a population of 59,602 people in mid 2024.

== Governance ==
=== Villages ===
Darul Imarah District, which contains part of the southern suburbs of Banda Aceh city, is divided into four mukims (townships/subdistricts), namely Mukim Ulee Susu, Mukim Lamreung, Mukim Daroy (Jeumpet), and Mukim Lam Ara, which in total consists of 32 villages, listed below with their areas and their populations as at mid 2024:

Kode Wilayah	Name of gampong	Name of mukim	Area in km^{2}	Pop'n Estimate mid 2024	No. of hamlets (dusun)
11.06.07.2001	Lampeuneurut Ujong Blang	Lamreung	0.27	2,345	3
11.06.07.2002	Lampeuneurut Gampong	Lamreung	0.77	1,326	3
11.06.07.2003	Lamreung	Lamreung	0.99	2,759	4
11.06.07.2004	Lamcot	Lamreung	0.93	2,666	5
11.06.07.2005	Lam Blang Trieng	Lamreung	0.44	1,114	4
11.06.07.2006	Lam Blang Manyang	Lamreung	0.77	1,168	4
11.06.07.2007	Bayu	Lamreung	0.45	2,147	3
11.06.07.2008	Lagang	Lamreung	0.23	1,005	3
11.06.07.2009	Lamsiteh	Lamreung	0.31	627	3
11.06.07.2010	Lamkawee	Lamreung	0.52	955	3
11.06.07.2011	Lheu Blang	Lamreung	0.24	1,169	3
11.06.07.2012	Payaroh	Ulee Susu	0.63	1,132	4
11.06.07.2013	Lamsidaya	Ulee Susu	0.46	1,243	4
11.06.07.2014	Kuta Karang	Ulee Susu	0.20	818	4
11.06.07.2015	Leu Geu	Ulee Susu	0.29	536	3
11.06.07.2016	Lampeuneu'eun (Monjen)	Ulee Susu	0.45	821	4
11.06.07.2017	Lamtheun	Ulee Susu	0.41	1,039	3
11.06.07.2018	Deunong	Ulee Susu	2.61	1,364	4
11.06.07.2019	Tingkeum	Lam Ara	0.53	1,500	3
11.06.07.2020	Kandang	Lam Ara	0.18	409	2
11.06.07.2021	Lam Bheu	Lam Ara	0.75	5,316	5
11.06.07.2022	Daroy Kameu	Lam Ara	0.29	699	3
11.06.07.2023	Geundring	Daroy	2.00	927	4
11.06.07.2024	Garot Geuceu	Daroy	0.99	4,884	5
11.06.07.2025	Pasheu Beutong	Daroy	0.99	1,630	4
11.06.07.2026	Lampasi Engking	Daroy	0.68	2,203	4
11.06.07.2027	Jeumpet Ajun	Daroy	0.72	2,669	4
11.06.07.2028	Gue Gajah	Daroy	0.57	5,951	5
11.06.07.2029	Leu Ue	Daroy	1.76	2,095	3
11.06.07.2030	Ulee Lueng	Daroy	0.75	987	3
11.06.07.2031	Punie	Daroy	1.76	3,935	4
11.06.07.2032	Ulee Tuy	Daroy	1.48	2,063	3
	Totals		24.35	59,602	117
