= Lhoknga, Aceh Besar =

Lhoknga District is an administrative district (kecamatan) of Aceh Besar Regency within Aceh Province of Indonesia, at the northern end of Sumatra Island. It lies to the west of the city of Banda Aceh. It covers an area of 87.95 km^{2}, and had a population of 14,874 at the 2010 Census and 16,927 at the 2020 Census; the official estimate as at mid 2024 was 18,218 - thus having an average population density of 207.1 per km^{2}.

The district is sub-divided into 28 administrative villages (gampong), containing 94 actual villages, all sharing the postcode of 23355. They are grouped into 4 mukim, as shown below. The gampong are listed below with their areas and the populations as officially estimated at mid 2024.

Kode Wilayah	Name of gampong	Name of mukim	Area in km^{2}	Pop'n Estimate mid 2024
11.06.02.2001	Mon Ikeun	Lhoknga	28.67	1,411
11.06.02.2002	Nusa	Kueh	2.90	1,134
11.06.02.2003	Weuraya	Lhoknga	0.21	1,058
11.06.02.2004	Lamkruet	Lhoknga	0.61	1,199
11.06.02.2005	Lamgaboh	Kueh	0.66	799
11.06.02.2006	Lambaro Kueh	Kueh	13.74	612
11.06.02.2007	Lam Ateuk	Kueh	0.39	570
11.06.02.2008	Kueh	Kuek	0.47	538
11.06.02.2009	Tanjong	Kueh	0.37	866
11.06.02.2010	Aneuk Paya	Kueh	0.62	708
11.06.02.2011	Seubun Keutapang	Kueh	0.63	523
11.06.02.2012	Seubun Ayon	Kueh	0.78	353
11.06.02.2013	Lambaro Seubun	Kueh	1.46	421
11.06.02.2014	Naga Umbang	Kueh	11.12	442

Kode Wilayah	Name of gampong	Name of mukim	Area in km^{2}	Pop'n Estimate mid 2024
11.06.02.2015	Lampaya	Lhoknga	1.81	1,803
11.06.02.2016	Meunasah Mesjid Lamlhom	Lamlhom	0.21	480
11.06.02.2017	(Meunasah) Mon Cut	Lamlhom	1.44	431
11.06.02.2018	Meunasah Manyang	Lamlhom	0.97	427
11.06.02.2019	(Meunasah) Lamgirek	Lamlhom	8.49	229
11.06.02.2020	Meunasah Lambaro	Lampuuk	1.19	631
11.06.02.2021	Meunasah Baro (Lamlhom)	Lamlhom	0.59	404
11.06.02.2022	Meunasah Beutong	Lamlhom	1.93	556
11.06.02.2023	Meunasah Mesjid Lampuuk	Lampuuk	0.78	447
11.06.02.1024	Meunasah Balee	Lampuuk	7.13	633
11.06.02.1025	Meunasah Karieng	Lamlhom	0.10	661
11.06.02.1026	Lamcok	Kueh	0.36	394
11.06.02.1027	Meunasah Cut	Lampuuk	0.13	238
11.06.02.1028	Meunasah Blang	Lampuuk	0.49	250
11.06.02	Totals		87.95	18,218
