= Jantho =

- Town
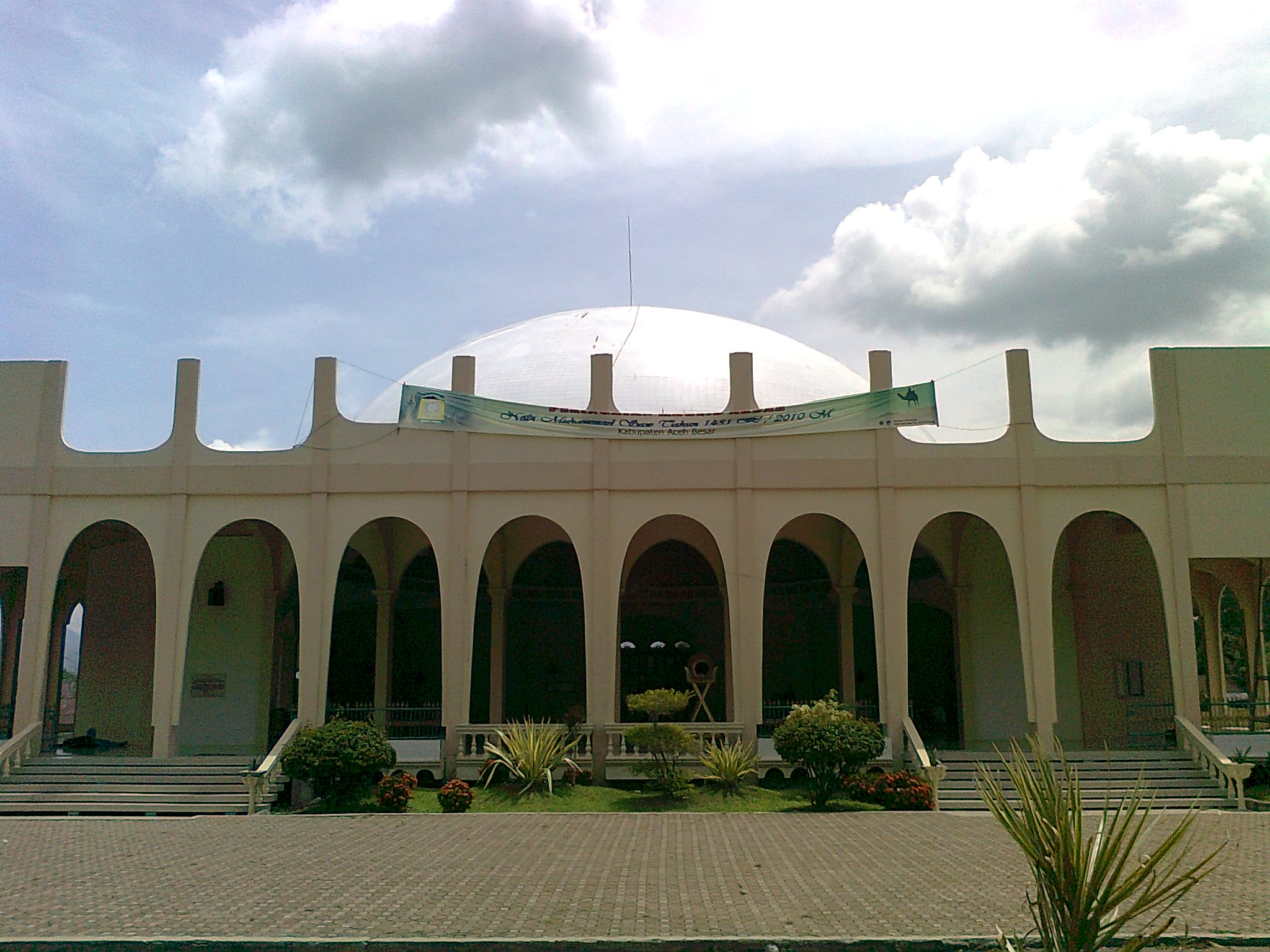
- Great Mosque of Jantho, Greater Aceh

- Location in Aceh, Northern Sumatra, Sumatra and Indonesia Jantho (Northern Sumatra) Jantho (Sumatra) Jantho (Indonesia)
- Coordinates: 5°18′00″N 95°38′00″E
- Country: Indonesia
- Province: Aceh
- Regency: Aceh Besar Regency

Area
  - Total: 592.50 km^{2} (228.77 sq mi)

Population (2020 Census)
  - Total: 9,440
- Time zone: UTC+7 (IWST)

Kota Jantho (Jantho town) is a small town in Aceh province of Indonesia. Jantho is the seat of local government for the Aceh Besar Regency. It covers an area of 592.5 km^{2} and had a population of 8,443 at the 2010 Census and 9,440 at the 2020 Census.

Jantho became famous due to a report of two women being publicly whipped in 2010 after being found guilty of selling food during the fasting hours of Ramadan, in accordance with Sharia law.

== Climate ==
Jantho has a tropical rainforest climate (Af) with moderate to heavy rainfall year-round.

Climate data for Jantho
Month	Jan	Feb	Mar	Apr	May	Jun	Jul	Aug	Sep	Oct	Nov	Dec	Year
Mean daily maximum °C (°F)	28.0 (82.4)	29.0 (84.2)	30.9 (87.6)	31.6 (88.9)	30.0 (86.0)	30.5 (86.9)	30.0 (86.0)	30.7 (87.3)	29.9 (85.8)	30.2 (86.4)	28.9 (84.0)	28.0 (82.4)	29.8 (85.7)
Daily mean °C (°F)	25.7 (78.3)	26.1 (79.0)	27.0 (80.6)	27.7 (81.9)	27.1 (80.8)	27.6 (81.7)	27.0 (80.6)	27.6 (81.7)	26.9 (80.4)	27.4 (81.3)	26.4 (79.5)	25.9 (78.6)	26.9 (80.4)
Mean daily minimum °C (°F)	23.4 (74.1)	23.3 (73.9)	23.1 (73.6)	23.9 (75.0)	24.3 (75.7)	24.7 (76.5)	24.0 (75.2)	24.6 (76.3)	23.9 (75.0)	24.6 (76.3)	23.9 (75.0)	23.8 (74.8)	24.0 (75.1)
Average rainfall mm (inches)	180 (7.1)	126 (5.0)	166 (6.5)	175 (6.9)	144 (5.7)	72 (2.8)	65 (2.6)	104 (4.1)	134 (5.3)	211 (8.3)	238 (9.4)	241 (9.5)	1,856 (73.2)
Source: Climate-Data.org

== See also ==
- List of regencies and cities of Indonesia
