= Baitussalam =

District of Aceh Besar, Aceh

- District
- Interactive map of Baitussalam
- Coordinates: 5°35′48.708″N 95°22′28.4744″E
- Country: Indonesia
- Province: Aceh
- Regency: Aceh Besar
- District seat: Lambada Lhok

Area
  - Total: 20.84 km^{2} (8.05 sq mi)

Population (2025 estimate)
  - Total: 26,806
  - Density: 1,286/km^{2} (3,331/sq mi)
- Time zone: UTC+7 (WIB)
- Postal code: 23373
- Regional code: 11.06.20
- Villages: 13

Baitussalam is an administrative district (kecamatan) in Aceh Besar Regency of Aceh Province of Indonesia. It is situated immediately to the east of the city of Bandar Aceh, and contains some of the eastern suburbs of that city, including part of the coastal zone. As of mid 2025, it had a population of 26,806 and covers an area of 20.84 km².

== Governance ==
=== Mukims and villages ===
There are two mukims (townships/subdistricts) in Baitussalam, which are Mukim Klieng containing 9 villages (gampong) and Mukim Silang Cadek containing 4 villages (gampong).

- Mukim Klieng
  - Cot Paya
  - Klieng Cot Aron
  - Klieng Meuria
  - Labui
  - Lam Asan
  - Lambada Lhok
  - Lampineung
  - Lam Ujong
  - Miruk Lam Reudeup
- Mukim Silang Cadek
  - Baet
  - Blang Krueng
  - Cadek
  - Kajhu

== Climate ==
Climate data for Baitussalam, Aceh
Month	Jan	Feb	Mar	Apr	May	Jun	Jul	Aug	Sep	Oct	Nov	Dec	Year
Mean daily maximum °C (°F)	31.6 (88.9)	31.4 (88.5)	31.6 (88.9)	31.4 (88.5)	31.8 (89.2)	31.2 (88.2)	30.6 (87.1)	30.4 (86.7)	30.2 (86.4)	31.7 (89.1)	31.8 (89.2)	31.6 (88.9)	31.3 (88.3)
Mean daily minimum °C (°F)	23.4 (74.1)	23.9 (75.0)	24.0 (75.2)	23.4 (74.1)	23.8 (74.8)	24.0 (75.2)	23.6 (74.5)	23.4 (74.1)	23.5 (74.3)	24.2 (75.6)	23.0 (73.4)	23.0 (73.4)	23.6 (74.5)
Average precipitation mm (inches)	150 (5.9)	120 (4.7)	130 (5.1)	140 (5.5)	160 (6.3)	170 (6.7)	180 (7.1)	190 (7.5)	200 (7.9)	210 (8.3)	220 (8.7)	230 (9.1)	2,100 (82.8)
Source: Meteorology, Climatology, and Geophysical Agency (Note: This data is an estimate from BMKG's forecast and may change according to the latest weather conditions)
