= Breueh Island =

Island in Great Aceh Regency, Aceh Province, Indonesia

Breueh
Native name: Pulau Breueh
- Location within Sumatra Location within Bay of Bengal

Geography
- Coordinates: 5°42′0″N 95°4′0″E

Administration
- Indonesia
- Region: Sumatra
- Province: Aceh
- Regency: Aceh Besar

Breueh Island (also Pulo Breuh, Pulau Breuh, Poelau Bras, Poeloe Bras) is an island in Pulo Aceh District, Aceh Besar Regency, part of Aceh Province of Indonesia off the northwest tip of the island of Sumatra. It is about 18 mi west-northwest of Banda Aceh, the provincial capital. The island measures about 8.5 miles in length and 6 miles in width at its south end, and has a steep coastline with sandy beaches along its southern coast.

The administrative centre of Pulo Aceh District, Lampuyang, is located in the southeast corner of Breueh Island.

To the southeast are the islands of Nasi, Teunom, Bunta and Batee, while the larger Weh Island (forming the City of Sabang) is situated to the northeast.

The International Hydrographic Organization defines the northern tip of Breueh Island (under the name Poeloe Bras) as the southeasternmost point of the Bay of Bengal and as part of the southwestern limit of the Andaman Sea. To the southwest of Breueh is the open Indian Ocean. The Nicobar Islands' southernmost point is about 108 mi northwest of Breueh.
