= Fort Inong Balee =

1599 fort in Aceh, Indonesia

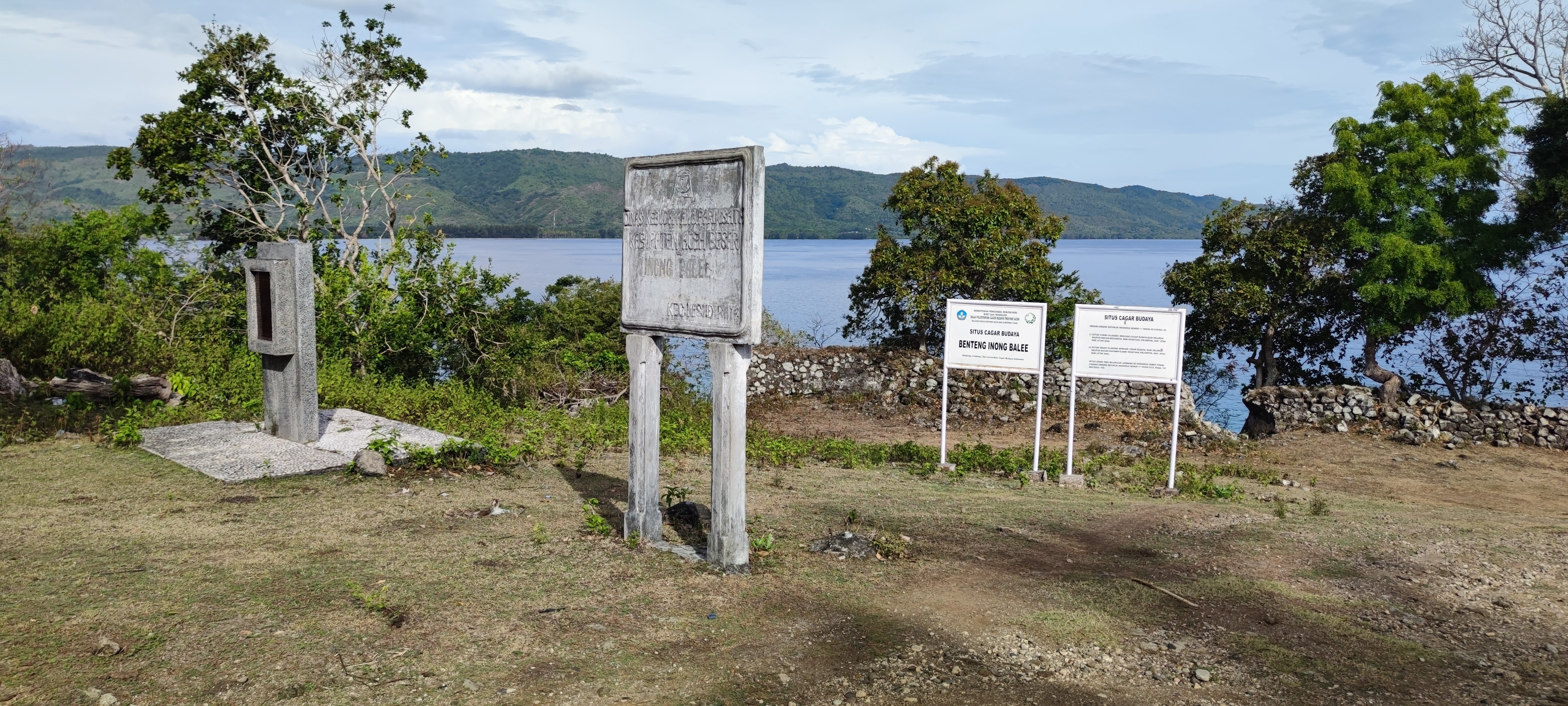
Fort Inong Balee

Fort Inong Balee (Acehnese: Kuta Inong Balèe) is located on a small hill along Krueng Raya Bay, Lam Reh, Aceh, Indonesia, overlooking the Indian Ocean. The fort was built in 1599 by Keumalahayati, an Aceh female Admiral, to accommodate the Inong Balee army. Besides fortification, Fort Inong Balee also served as accommodation for women whose husband were killed in battle, as well as a military training facility were Keumalahayati trained the woman soldiers of Aceh Kingdom, and a military logistic center. With its strategic hill location-approximately 100 meters above sea level - the fort had an unhindered view of all ships coming into the port of Aceh Kingdom. The Inong Balee army could therefore easily attack Portuguese and Dutch warships.

When newly formed, the Inong Balee army only consisted of about 1000 widows whose husbands died in the battle against Portuguese on the Haru Sea. Then this widow's army was expanded by Keumalahayati into about 2000 soldiers, including young girls who wished to fight for Aceh.

According to estimates made by the Medan Archaeological Agency, the fort is a rectangular structure measuring about 60 m x 40 m with an encircling stone wall 2 meters thick and 2.5 meters high. On the wall there were half-circle holes directly facing the bay. At present there are remnants of the west wall with 4 loops, parts of the north wall and parts of the east structure foundation. Although now the remnants are regretfully just unkempt ruins, visitors can still enjoy the view of Krueng Raya Bay and Malahayati Harbor. Beside Fort Inong Balee and the tomb of Admiral Malahayati, another remnant of the Inong Balee army around the fort is Inong Balee village, otherwise known as Village of Widows.

== See also ==
- Indra Patra Fortress
- Fort Iskandar Muda
- Fort Kuta Lubok
