= Keumalahayati =

Indonesian female admiral

Laksamana Keumalahayati
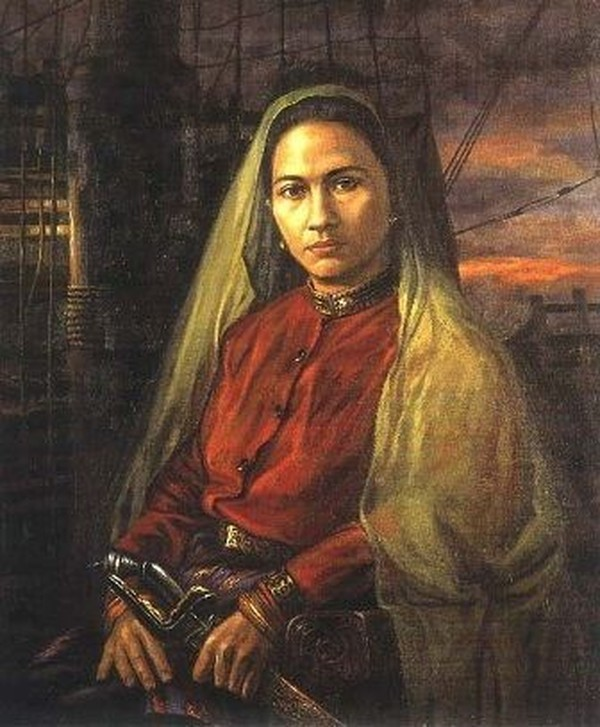
- The painting of Malahayati
- Born: 1 January 1550; Aceh Besar, Aceh Sultanate
- Died: 30 June 1615 (aged 65); Cape of Krueng Raya, Aceh Sultanate
- Burial place: Krueng Raya, Lamreh, Aceh Besar; 5°35′28.9″N 95°31′40.3″E
- Spouse: Tuanku Mahmuddin bin Said Al Latief
- Relatives: Laksamana Mahmud Syah (father); Laksamana Muhammad Said Syah (grandfather); Sultan Salahuddin Shah (great-grandparent)
- Military career
- Allegiance: Aceh Sultanate
- Branch: Inong Balee
- Service years: 1585–1615
- Rank: Admiral (Laksamana)
- Conflicts: Acehnese–Dutch conflicts; Battle of Aceh (1599); Incident on the Aceh Coast; Acehnese–Portuguese conflicts; Battle of Tanjung Parit
- Awards: National Hero of Indonesia

Keumalahayati, or Malahayati (fl. 16th century), was an admiral of the Aceh Sultanate navy, which ruled the area of modern Aceh Province, Sumatra, Indonesia. She is described as the first woman admiral in the modern world. Her troops were drawn from Aceh's widows and the army named the "Inong Balee", after Fort Inong Balee.

== History ==
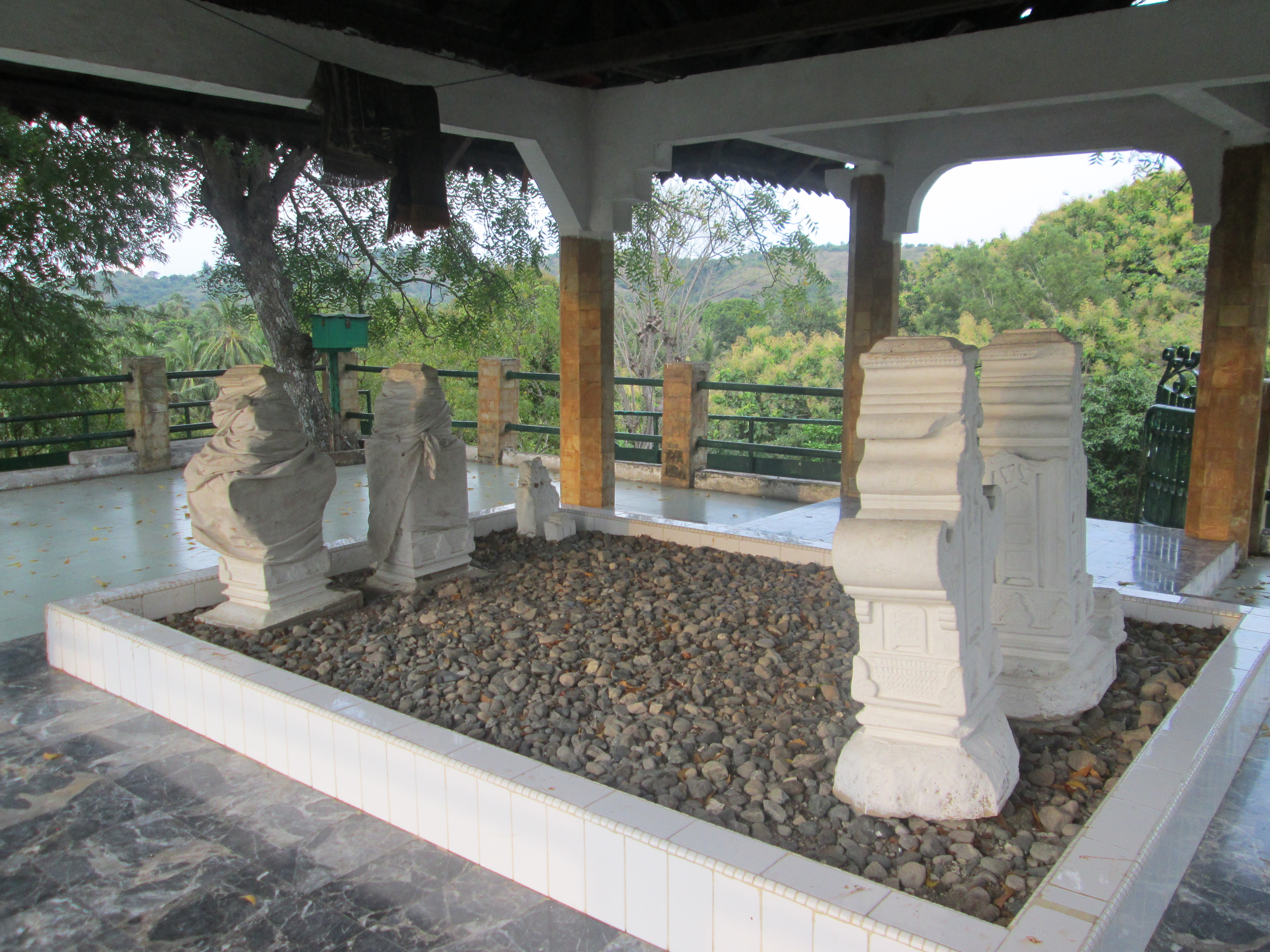
The grave of Malahayati of Aceh. However, this grave dates to the 19th century.

Malahayati was a daughter of Admiral Machmud Syah of the Aceh Empire. After graduating from Pesantren, an Islamic school, she continued her studies at the Aceh Royal Military Academy, known as Ma’had Baitul Maqdis.

Following the fall of Malacca to Portuguese invaders, Aceh became a stronger faction and ensured that merchant shipping routes in the Malacca Strait remained exclusively for Asian traders. The kingdom's leader, Sultan Alauddin Mansur Syah strengthened his military power by building a powerful navy to which he decided to appoint Malahayati, a widowed Aceh warrior, as his First Admiral. Aceh soldiers and the other generals had always respected Malahayati. She had also proved herself a legendary commander during several battles with the Portuguese and Dutch.

=== Battle of Aceh (1599) ===
In 1599, Dutch expedition commander Cornelis de Houtman arrived at the port of Aceh. The Sultan accepted him peacefully until de Houtman insulted him. The Dutchman, who had already clashed with the Banten Sultanate in northwest Java before his arrival in Aceh, decided to attack. Malahayati led her Inong Balee Army in response to the Dutch challenge and after several violent battles, finally killed de Houtman on 11 September 1599.

=== Incident on the Aceh Coast ===
In 1600, the Dutch Navy, led by Paulus van Caerden, robbed an Aceh merchant ship of its pepper off the Aceh coast. After this incident, In June 1601, Malahayati ordered the arrest of Dutch Admiral Jacob van Neck. After many incidents which blocked Dutch Navy expeditions and the threat from the Spanish fleet, Maurits van Oranje sent emissaries with diplomatic letter of apology to the Empire of Aceh. The emissaries were Admiral Laurens Bicker and Gerard de Roy. In August 1601, Malahayati met Maurits's emissaries for a treaty agreement. A ceasefire was agreed and the Dutch paid 50 thousand gulden as compensation for Paulus van Caerden's actions, while Malahayati released Dutch prisoners. After the agreement, the Sultan sent three emissaries to the Netherlands.

=== Aceh-English diplomatic relations ===
In June 1602, Malahayati's reputation as the guardian of the Aceh Sultanate led England to choose a peaceful, diplomatic method by which to enter the Malacca Strait. A letter from Queen Elizabeth I was brought by James Lancaster to the Sultan, and it was Malahayati who led the negotiation with Lancaster. The agreement opened the English route to Java, and they were soon afterwards able to build merchant offices in Banten. Elizabeth I rewarded Lancaster with a knighthood for his successful diplomacy in Aceh and Banten.

=== Death ===
Malahayati was killed in combat while defending at Teuluk Krueng Raya from the Portuguese fleet. She was buried at the slope of Bukit Kota Dalam, a small fishing village 34 km from Banda Aceh, while others note the detailed location of the complex to be in Desa Lamreh, Mesjid Raya, Aceh Besar.

== Historiography ==
The sole mention of a female admiral in period sources is a report by explorer John Davis that "a woman is Admiral, for [the sultan] will trust no men." There is no source reporting on the existence of a woman named Keumalahayati, nor that a woman killed Cornelis de Houtman. The earliest publication in which the name "Keumalahayati" appears is a 1935 work of fiction, Oude Glorie by Marie Van Zeggelen, the Dutch wife of a colonial official. Several decades after Van Zeggelen's novel was published, it began to be claimed that memory of Keumalahayati had survived in Acehnese oral tradition.

== Legacy ==
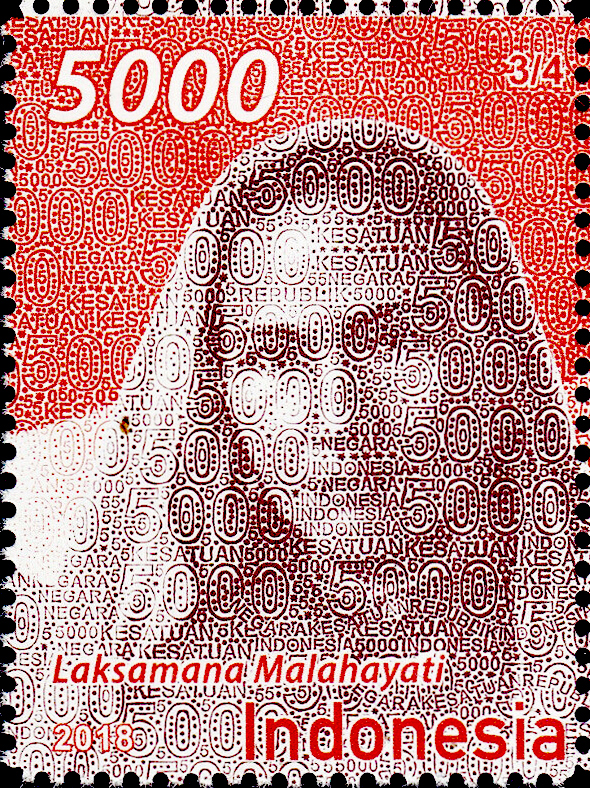
Keumalahayati in 2018 Indonesian stamp

Malahayati has had universities, hospitals and roads in several Sumatran cities as well as the naval ship KRI Malahayati, named after her. A naval port near her grave is also dubbed Malahayati Port.

In November 2017, President Joko Widodo awarded her the honorary National Hero of Indonesia.

== In popular media ==
In video games

- In Destiny, Malahayati was a submind of the Warmind Rasputin, one of the vast machine intelligences built during the Golden Age.

== See also ==
- Acehnese-Portuguese conflicts
- Aceh expedition (1606)
