= Peukan Bada, Aceh Besar =

Peukan Bada District is an administrative district (kecamatan) of Aceh Besar Regency within Aceh Province of Indonesia, at the northern end of Sumatra Island. It lies immediately to the west of the city of Banda Aceh, and several of its administrative villages in the east of the district are suburbs of Banda Aceh. It covers an area of 36.25 km^{2}, and had a population of 15,462 at the 2010 Census and 22,654 at the 2020 Census; the official estimate as at mid 2024 was 24,550 - thus having an average population density of 677.24 per km^{2}.

The district is sub-divided into 26 administrative villages (gampong), containing 92 actual villages, all sharing the postcode of 23351. They are grouped into 4 mukim, as shown below. The gampong are listed below with their areas and the populations as officially estimated at mid 2024; of these 26, Pulo Bunta gampong covers the offshore islands of Pulau Bunta and Pulau Batee in the northwest of the district, with just 79 inhabitants in mid 2024, while the four sparsely populated gampong of Lampageu, Lambaro Nejid, Lamguron and Lambadeuk (comprising the mukim of Lampageu) are situated in the west of the district.

The eastern part of the district contains some western suburbs of Banda Aceh city - notably in the gampong of Ajuen, Lam Hasan, Paya Tieng, Lam Lumpu, Lamteh and Gampong Baro - all immediately adjacent to the city boundary with a combined area of 3.70 km^{2} and 11,097 inhabitants in mid 2024.

Kode Wilayah	Name of gampong	Name of mukim	Area in km^{2}	Pop'n Estimate mid 2024
11.06.08.2001	Lambadeuk	Lampageu	1.68	282
11.06.08.2002	Lamguron	Lampageu	1.09	191
11.06.08.2003	Lambaro Nejid	Lampageu	6.73	989
11.06.08.2004	Lampageu	Lampageu	5.57	395
Sub-total	Mukim Lampageu		15.07	1,657
11.06.08.2005	Gampong Baro	Lamteungoh	0.06	620
11.06.08.2006	Lammanyang	Lamteungoh	0.77	642
11.06.08.2007	Lamteh	Lamteungoh	0.51	1,095
11.06.08.2008	Lam Lumpu	Lamteungoh	1.06	2,176
11.06.08.2009	Lamteungoh	Lamteungoh	0.11	416
11.06.08.2010	Lamtutui	Lamteungoh	1.46	395
11.06.08.2011	Meunasah Tuha	Lamteungoh	0.81	861
11.06.08.2012	Lam Awe	Lamteungoh	0.33	375
11.06.08.2013	Pulo Bunta	Lamteungoh	3.00	79
Sub-total	Mukim Lamteungog		8.11	6,609

Kode Wilayah	Name of gampong	Name of mukim	Area in km^{2}	Pop'n Estimate mid 2024
11.06.08.2014	Beuradeun	Gurah	2.23	426
11.06.08.2015	Lampisang	Gurah	1.54	874
11.06.08.2016	Keuneu Eu	Gurah	0.35	612
11.06.08.2017	Lam Isek	Gurah	1.39	935
11.06.08.2018	Lamkeumok	Gurah	0.19	500
11.06.08.2019	Lam Rukam	Gurah	0.77	689
11.06.08.2020	Gurah	Gurah	2.45	862
11.06.08.2021	Rima Jeuneu	Gurah	0.69	1,068
11.06.08.2022	Lam Geu Eu	Gurah	0.99	1,870
Sub-total	Mukim Gurah		10.60	7,836
11.06.08.2023	Lam Hasan	Lambarueh	0.81	3,114
11.06.08.1024	Paya Tieng	Lambarueh	0.51	1,173
11.06.08.1025	Ajuen	Lambarueh	0.75	2,919
11.06.08.1026	Rima Keuneurom	Lambarueh	0.40	992
Sub-total	Mukim Lambarueh		2.47	8,198
11.06.08	Totals		36.25	24,550
