= Aceh Besar Regency =

Regency in Aceh, Indonesia

Great Aceh Regency Kabupaten Aceh Besar
- Regency

Regional transcription(s)
  - Jawoe: اچيه رايك
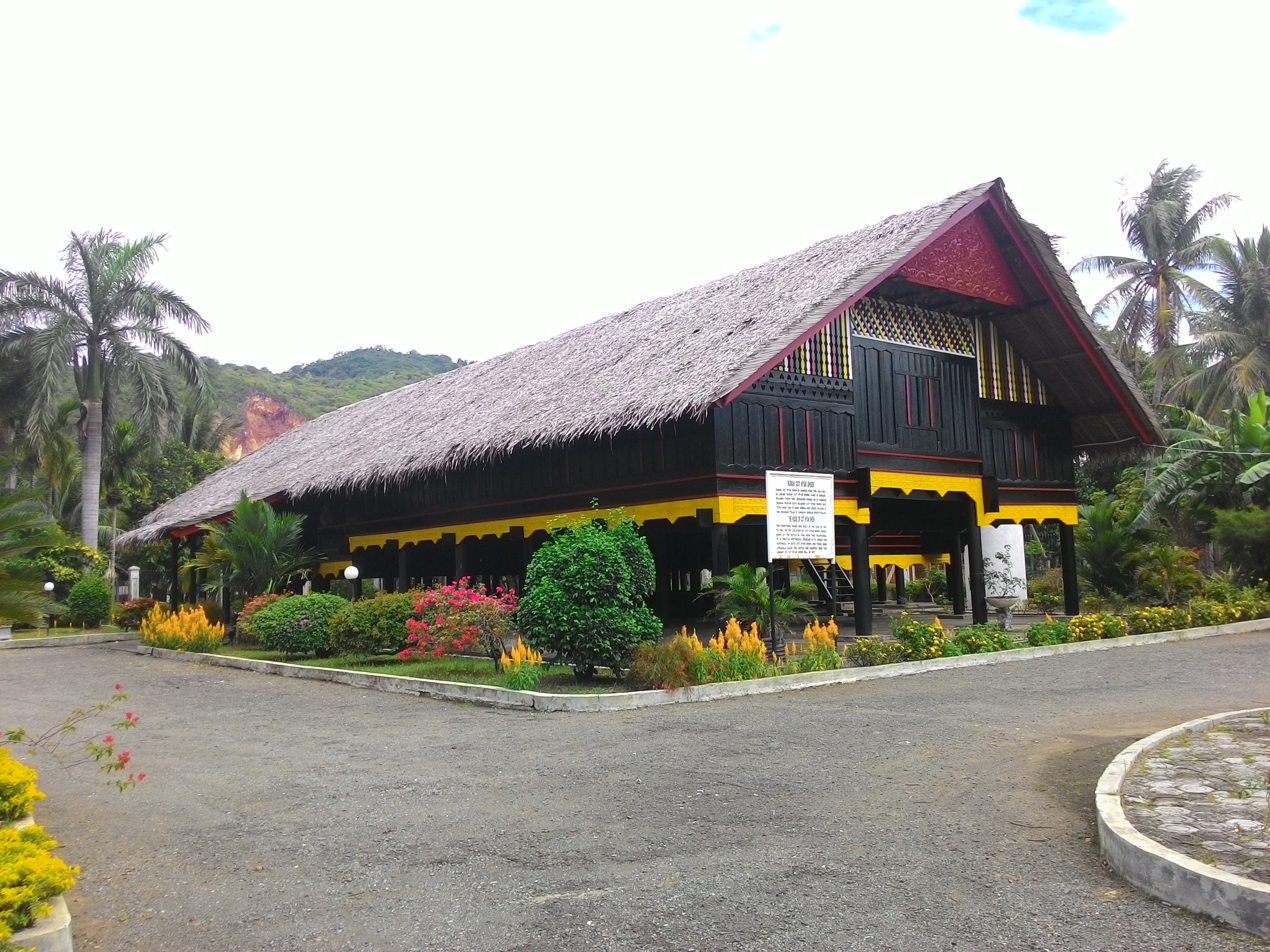
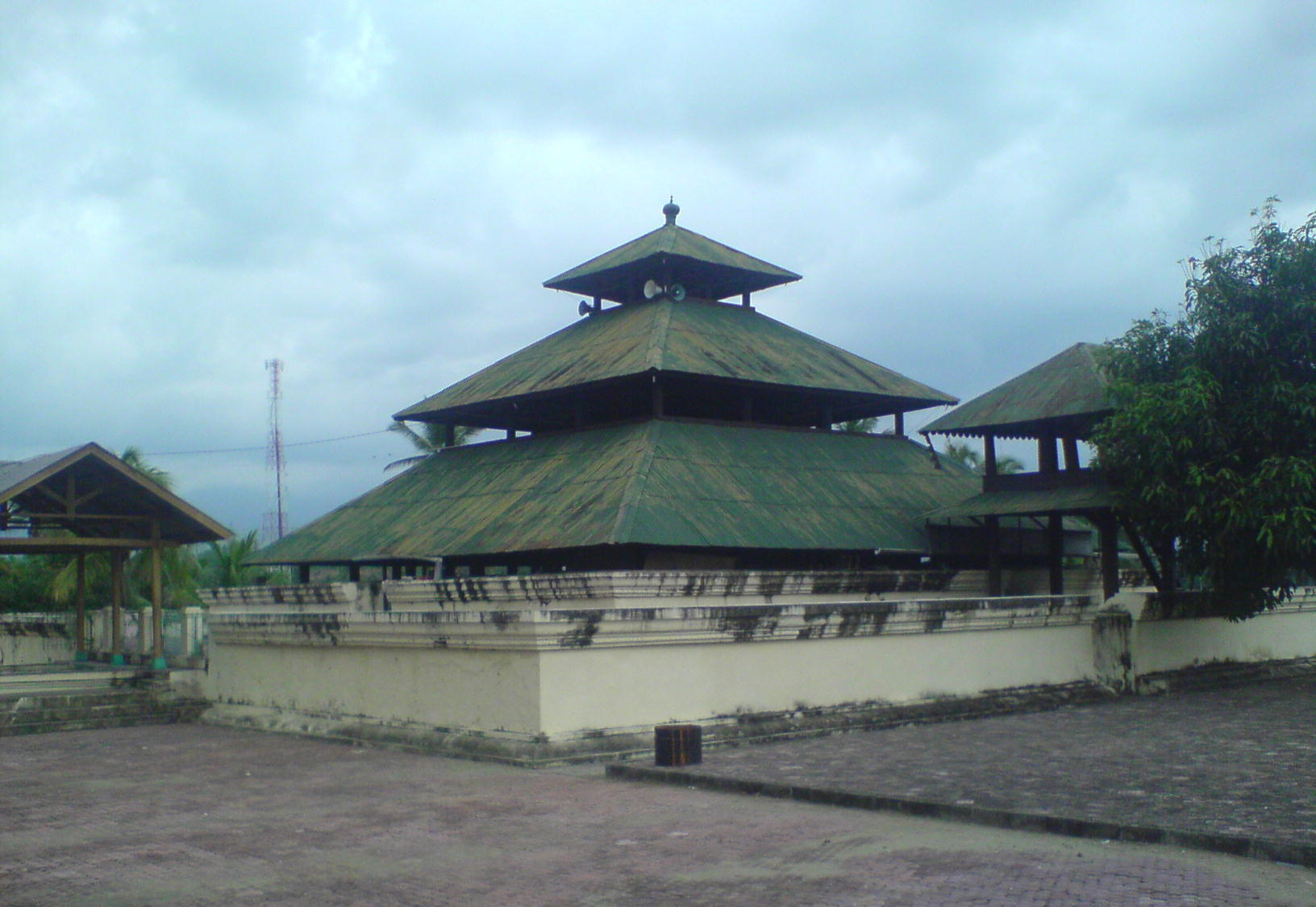
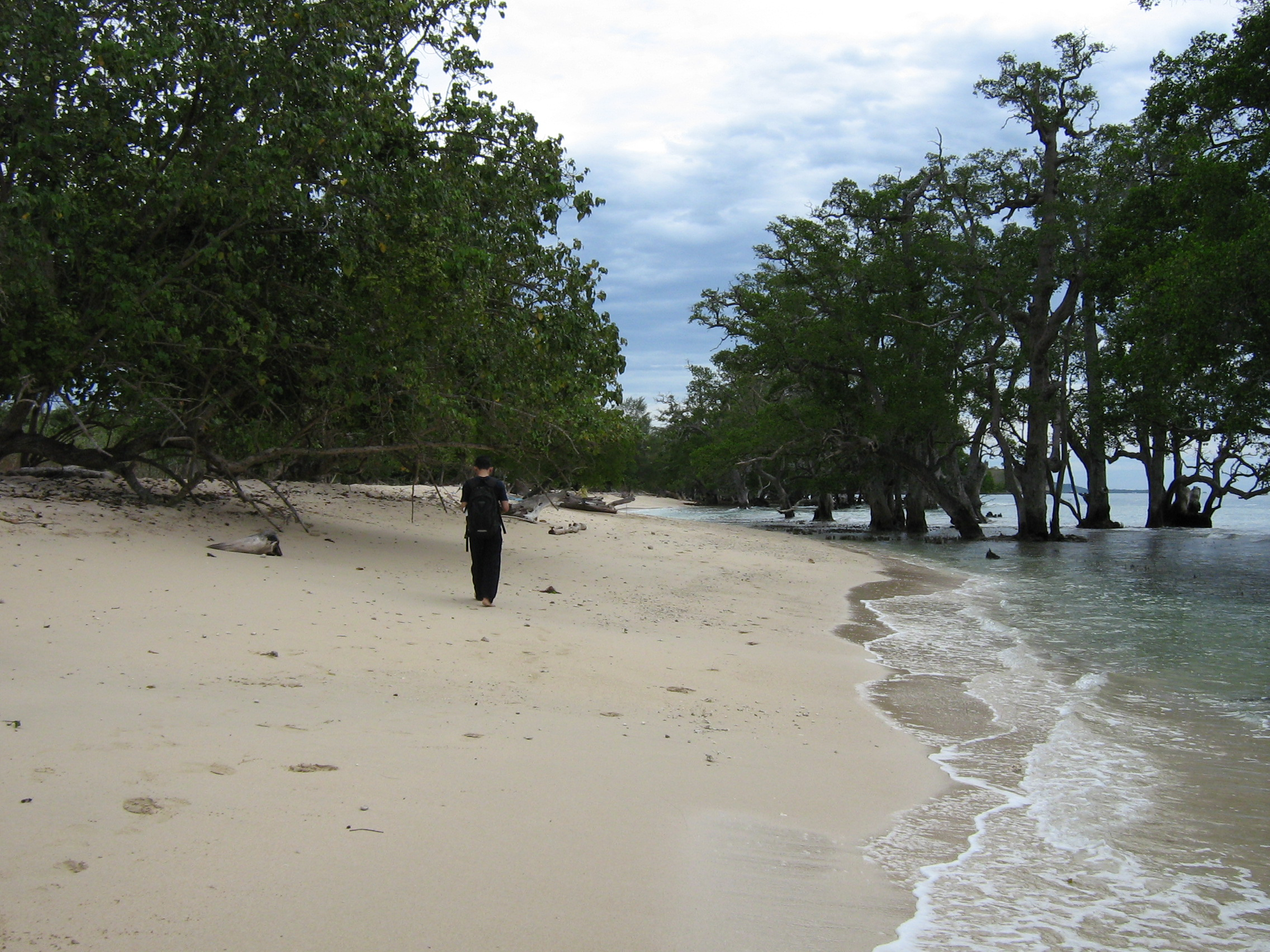
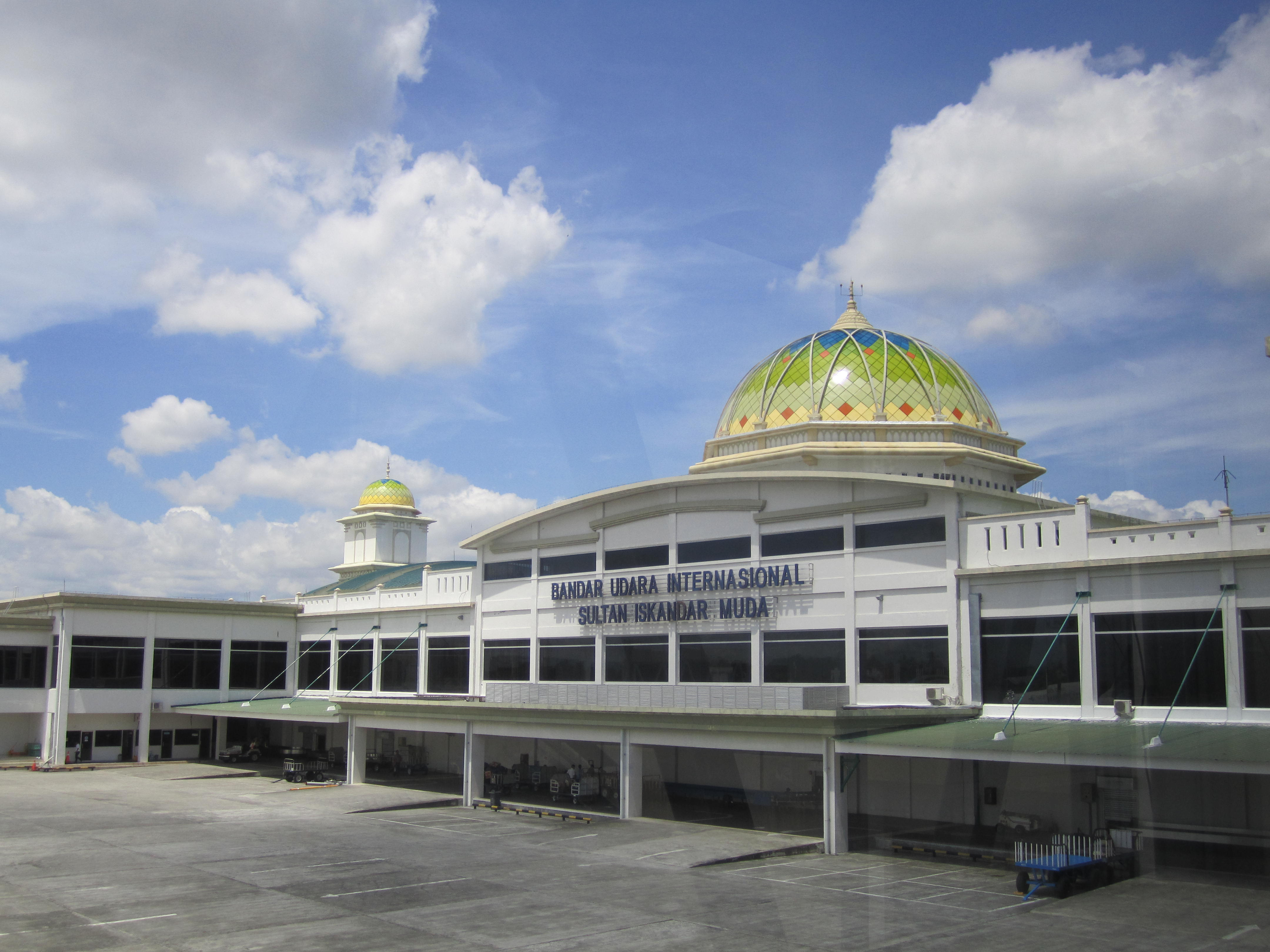
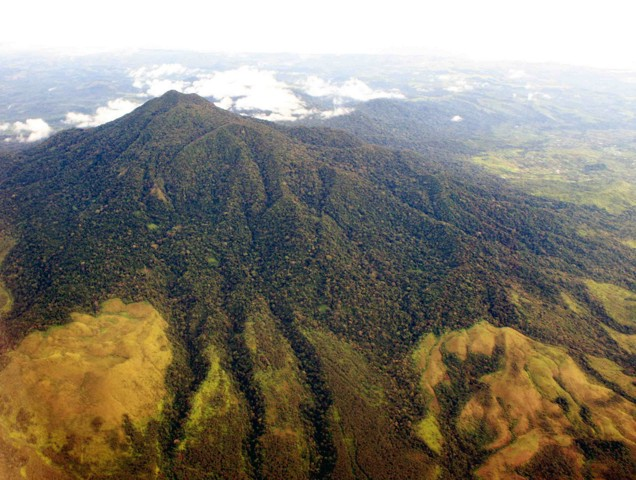
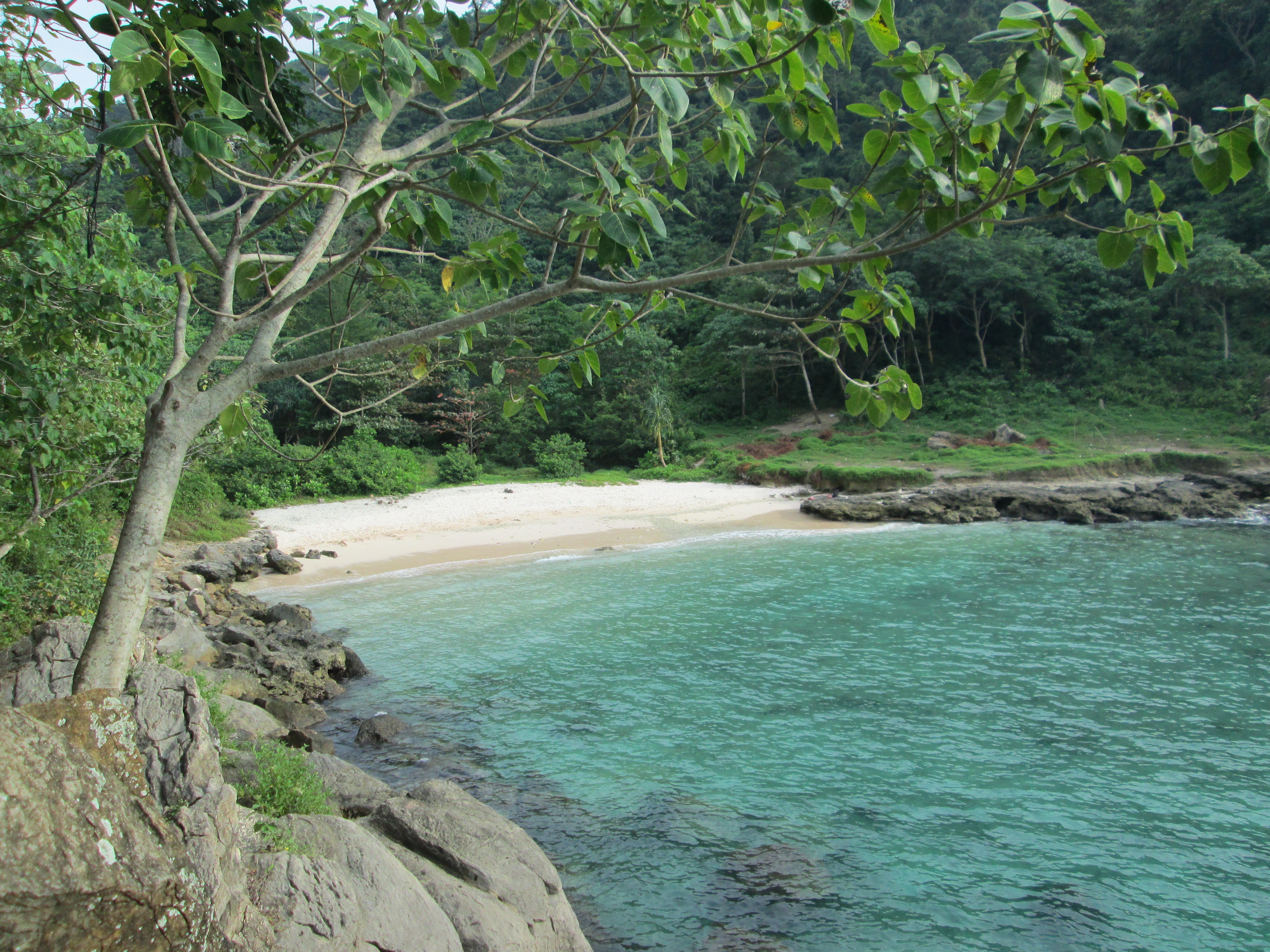
- From top left : Cut Nyak Dhien house, Indrapuri Old Mosque, Lhok Me Beach, Sultan Iskandar Muda Airport, Seulawah Agam, Lhok Mata Ie beach

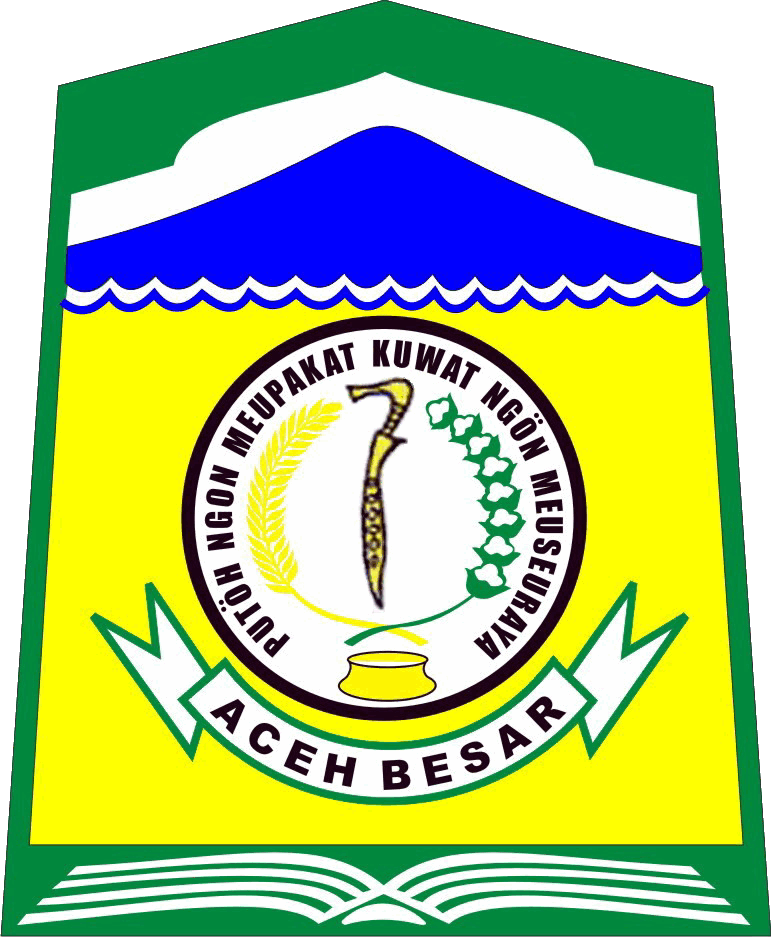
- Seal
- Motto: Putöh Ngon Meupakat, Kuwat Ngön Meuseuraya (Solved by Consensus, Strong by Together)
- Location within Aceh

- Location in Aceh, Northern Sumatra, Sumatra and Indonesia Great Aceh Regency (Northern Sumatra) Great Aceh Regency (Sumatra) Great Aceh Regency (Indonesia)
- Coordinates: 5°22′N 95°32′E
- Country: Indonesia
- Region: Sumatra
- Province: Aceh
- Established: 1956
- Regency seat: Jantho

Government
  - Regent: Muharram Idris
  - Vice Regent: Syukri A. Jalil

Area
  - Total: 2,903.49 km^{2} (1,121.04 sq mi)

Population (mid 2025 estimate)
  - Total: 453,070
  - Density: 156.04/km^{2} (404.15/sq mi)
- Time zone: UTC+7 (IWST)
- Area code: (+62) 651
- Website: acehbesarkab.go.id

Great Aceh Regency (Indonesian: Kabupaten Aceh Besar) is a regency of the Indonesian province of Aceh. It covers an area previously known as Lamuri. The regency covers an area of 2,903.49 square kilometres and had a population of 351,418 at the 2010 Census, 391,870 at the 2015 census and 405,535 at the 2020 Census; the official estimate as of mid 2025 was 453,070 (comprising 227,130 males and 225,940 females). The Regency is located at the northwest tip of Sumatra island and surrounds the provincial capital of Banda Aceh, many suburbs of which lie within the Regency. It also includes a number of islands off the northern tip of Sumatra, which comprise Pulo Aceh District within the regency. The seat of the Regency government is the town of Jantho.

== Economy ==
Aceh Besar Regency produces cloves, nutmeg and palm oil and rice, and also small quantities of maize, cassava, sweet potatoes and beans.

== Landmarks ==
=== Museums ===
Aceh Besar Regency contains several museums. The Museum dan Rumoh Aceh is the State Museum, located in Banda Aceh. The museum's main building is built in the style of a traditional Acehnese house. It was installed by Dutch Governor Van Swart in 1915. Museum Ali Hasymi contains the personal collection of Ali Hasymi, a former governor of Aceh and artist and include books by the scholars of Acehnese past, ancient ceramics, the typical weapons of Aceh, souvenirs from all over the world, etc. Museum Cut Nyak Dhien was originally the home of the heroine Cut Nyak Dhien. The ancient Abee Tanoh Library, located at the foot of Mount Seulawa contains some important manuscripts.

=== Places of worship ===
Indra Puri Old Mosque is located about 20 km south of Medan. Indra Puri was a Hindu kingdom and it was a place of worship before Islam arrived. Later, Sultan Iskandar Muda introduced Islam to the public. After the people embraced Islam, the previous temple was converted into a mosque. The mosque site covers an area of 33,875 m^{2}, and is located approximately 150 metres from the edge of the Krueng Aceh River.

=== Fortress and tombs ===
Indra Patra Fortress is situated 19 km from Banda Aceh at Krueng Raya. According to history it was built under the Indra Puri Hindu kingdom, although some say that the fort was built during the Sultanate of Aceh Darussalam in an effort to resist the Portuguese. The fort had a very important function at the time of Sultan Iskandar Muda.

The Tomb of Admiral Malahayati is located about 32 km from the city of Banda Aceh.

== Administrative divisions ==
The regency is divided administratively into twenty-three districts (Indonesian: kecamatan), which comprise 604 villages (Indonesian: gampong). The areas of the districts and their populations at the 2010 Census and the 2020 Census, together with the official estimates as of mid 2025, are listed below. These are grouped below into four geographical sections for convenience, which have no administrative significance. The table also includes the locations of the district administrative centres, the number of administrative villages (gampong) in each district, and its post code. The gampong are grouped into 68 mukim.

Kode Wilayah	Name of District (kecamatan)	Area in km^{2}	Pop'n Census 2010	Pop'n Census 2020	Pop'n Estimate mid 2025	Pop'n Density mid 2025	Admin centre	No. of mukim	No. of villages	Post code
11.06.13	Pulo Aceh ^{(a)}	90.56	3,796	4,463	4,949	54.6	Lampuyang	3	17	23991
11.06.08	Peukan Bada ^{(b)}	36.25	15,462	22,654	25,258	696.8	Peukan Bada	4	26	23351
11.06.02	Lhoknga	87.95	14,874	16,927	18,441	209.7	Lhoknga	4	28	23355
11.06.22	Leupung	169.15	2,553	3,392	3,826	22.6	Leupung	1	6	23353
11.06.01	Lhoong	149.03	9,093	9,860	10,755	72.2	Lhoong	4	28	23354
	Total Western section	532.94	45,778	57,296	63,229	118.6		16	105	
11.06.16	Kuta Cot Glie	332.25	12,388	14,075	15,686	47.2	Lampakuk	2	32	23364
11.06.04	Seulimeum	404.35	21,519	23,652	25,377	62.8	Seulimeum	5	47	23951
11.06.15	Kota Jantho (Jantho town)	592.50	8,443	9,440	9,737	16.4	Kota Jantho	1	13	23918: 23919
11.06.14	Lembah Seulawah (Seulawah Valley)	319.60	10,753	11,927	13,824	43.3	Lamtamot	2	12	23952
	Total Southern section ^{(c)}	1,648.70	53,103	59,094	64,624	39.2		10	104	
11.06.09	Mesjid Raya ^{(d)}	129.93	20,864	21,231	22,729	174.9	Krueng Raya	2	13	23381
11.06.12	Darussalam	38.43	22,633	22,834	25,128	653.9	Lambaro Angan	3	29	23374
11.06.20	Baitussalam	20.84	16,590	22,943	26,806	1,286.3	Lambada Lhok	2	13	23373
11.06.11	Kuta Baro	61.07	23,541	25,959	29,740	487.0	Peukan Ateuk	5	47	23372
11.06.05	Montasik	59.73	17,732	20,261	21,965	367.7	Montasik	3	39	23362
11.06.23	Blang Bintang	41.75	10,723	11,811	13,094	313.6	Cot Meuraja	3	26	23360
11.06.03	Indrapuri	197.04	19,975	22,372	25,104	127.4	Indrapuri	3	52	23363
11.06.17	Kuta Malaka	22.82	5,891	6,896	7,580	332.2	Samahani	1	15	23365
11.06.06	Suka Makmur	43.45	13,905	15,488	17,341	399.1	Sibreh	4	35	23361
11.06.18	Simpang Tiga	27.60	5,360	6,269	7,340	25.9	Krueng Mak	2	18	23375
11.06.19	Darul Kamal	23.05	6,766	8,472	9,598	416.4	Peukan Biluy	1	14	23350
	Total Eastern section	665.71	163,980	184,536	206,425	310.1		29	301	
11.06.07	Darul Imarah	24.35	46,397	54,145	60,903	2,501.1	Lampeuneurut	4	32	23352
11.06.10	Ingin Jaya	24.34	28,064	33,993	38,228	1,570.6	Lambaro	6	50	23371
11.06.21	Krueng Barona Jaya	6.96	14,096	16,471	19,661	2,824.9	Cot Irie	3	12	23370
	Total Southern Suburbs ^{(e)}	55.65	88,557	104,609	118,792	2,134.6		13	94	

Notes: (a) comprises a group of islands off the north-western tip of Sumatra, of which the largest are Pulau Breuh, Pulau Nasi and Pulau Teunom.
(b) includes some smaller islands off the north-western tip of Sumatra but closer to the mainland than Pulo Aceh District - Pulau Bunta and Pulau Batee.
(c) includes the Jantho Nature Park, southeast of Kota Jantho.
(d) includes Tanjung Dunung, the most northerly point on the Sumatran mainland. Four of the 13 villages comprising the district lie west of this cape (and thus can be considered as within the Krueng Aceh river valley and the orbit of Banda Aceh city), these are the gampong of Lamnga, Gampong Baro, Neuheun and Durung; the other nine are situated to the east of the cape, with Keude and Leupung as their main centres.
(e) comprises southern suburbs of Banda Aceh city, with 118,792 inhabitants in mid 2025.

Note that the eastern suburbs of Bandar Aceh city (including the two gampongs of Kopelma Durusalam and Rukoh, officially within the city boundaries but physically located on the eastern side of the Lamnyong River), comprise the Baitussalam, Darussalam and Kuta Baru Districts of the Regency, plus the four gampongs of Lamnga, Baru, Neuheun and Durung in Mesjid Raya District; in all, this area comprises 140.58 km^{2} with a total population of 100,958 in mid 2025.

== Rusa Island ==
Rusa Island in Lhoong district was shaped like Rusa (deer) before the tsunami struck the island on 26 December 2004, but now that much of it has been washed away, the form of the island has changed and become smaller like a lamb embryo. The island is very important for marking Indonesia's boundaries due to its location as the most westerly island in Indonesia with Titik Dasar TD175 and Titik Referensi TR175 (Base Point TD175 and Reference Point TR175).

== Bunta Island ==
Since the 2004 tsunami struck Bunta island, 45 minutes by traditional motorised boat from Ujong Pancu Village, Peukan Bada, there are no longer any inhabitants living there. Nowadays some people use the island as a coconut plantation, but they live in Banda Aceh. As the tsunami washed out all of the living creatures there, nowadays there are no squirrels, monkeys or snakes on the island. The island has been popularized by the documentary film Hikayat di Ujung Pesisir and is ideal for camping, but with no facilities at all, and modest snorkeling can be done there.

== Transport ==
Banda Aceh on the north coast is connected through Aceh Besar Regency with the rest of Sumatra by three principal highways. The northern route runs eastwards along the north Sumatran coast via Keude, Laweueng, Sigli and Meureudu towards Bireun. The central route runs up the valley of the Krueng Aceh river via Kota Jantho, Tangse and Geumpang towards Blangkejeren. The western route runs down the west Sumatran coast via Lamno and Calang towards Meulaboh.

Ferries connect Banda Aceh with the regency's northern islands of Nasi and Breueh, as well as with Matara, Sri Lanka, with Balohan (on Weh Island, Sabang), and with Phuket (Thailand).
