= Pulo Aceh =

District of Aceh Besar Regency, Indonesia

Pulo Aceh is a district of Aceh Besar Regency, Indonesia. It comprises a number of islands off the north-western tip of Sumatra, of which the largest are Pulau Breuh, Pulau Nasi and Pulau Teunom. It covers a land area of 90.56 km^{2} and had a population of 3,796 at the 2010 Census and 4,463 at the 2020 Census; the official estimate as at mid 2024 was 4,942, of which 972 were on Pulo Breuh Utara, 2,214 on Pulo Breuh Selatan, 1,566 on Pulo Nasi and 190 on Pulo Teunom; The district encompasses 17 villages (gampong), listed below with their areas and their official estimates of population as at mid 2024, which all share a post code of 23991.

Name of island	Kode Wilayah	Village (gampong)	Area (in km^{2})	Population estimate (mid 2024)
Pulo Breuh Utara (Breuh Island, northern section)	11.06.13.2001	Rinon	7.66	198
Pulo Breuh Utara (Breuh Island, northern section)	11.06.13.2002	Alue Raya	7.33	182
Pulo Breuh Utara (Breuh Island, northern section)	11.06.13.2003	Melingge	10.38	370
Pulo Breuh Utara (Breuh Island, northern section)	11.06.13.2004	Lapeng	6.77	222
Pulo Breuh Selatan (Breuh Island, southern section)	11.06.13.2005	Ulee Paya	3.74	209
Pulo Breuh Selatan (Breuh Island, southern section)	11.06.13.2006	Gugob	8.88	466
Pulo Breuh Selatan (Breuh Island, southern section)	11.06.13.2007	Seurapong	2.32	342
Pulo Breuh Selatan (Breuh Island, southern section)	11.06.13.2008	Blang Situngkoh	2.28	242
Pulo Breuh Selatan (Breuh Island, southern section)	11.06.13.2009	Paloh	2.42	217
Pulo Breuh Selatan (Breuh Island, southern section)	11.06.13.2010	Lampuyang	5.99	567
Pulo Breuh Selatan (Breuh Island, southern section)	11.06.13.2011	Lhoh	0.82	171
Pulo Teunom	11.06.13.2012	Teunom	4.62	190
Pulo Nasi	11.06.13.2013	Lamteng	6.77	219
Pulo Nasi	11.06.13.2014	Pasi Janeng	6.26	275
Pulo Nasi	11.06.13.2015	Rabo	4.79	411
Pulo Nasi	11.06.13.2016	Alue Riyeung	7.307	413
Pulo Nasi	11.06.13.2017	Deudap	5.33	248
Total district			90.56	4,942
