= Samahani =

- Mukim
- Samahani in Indonesia Samahani (Indonesia) Samahani (Asia)
- Coordinates: 5°26′6.09″N 95°23′37.58″E
- Country: Indonesia
- Province: Aceh
- Regency: Aceh Besar
- District: Kuta Malaka

Area
  - Total: 22.82 km^{2} (8.81 sq mi)

Population (2024)
  - Total: 7,403
  - Density: 324.4/km^{2} (840.2/sq mi)

Samahani (Jawoe: سماهني) is a mukim in Kuta Malaka District, Aceh Besar Regency, Aceh, Indonesia. In 2024, this mukim was inhabited by 7,403 people, and had a total area of 22.82 km^{2}.
