= Indra Patra Fortress =

Coordinates: 5°38′02.3″N 95°28′16.5″E

- Aceh Besar Regency, Indonesia
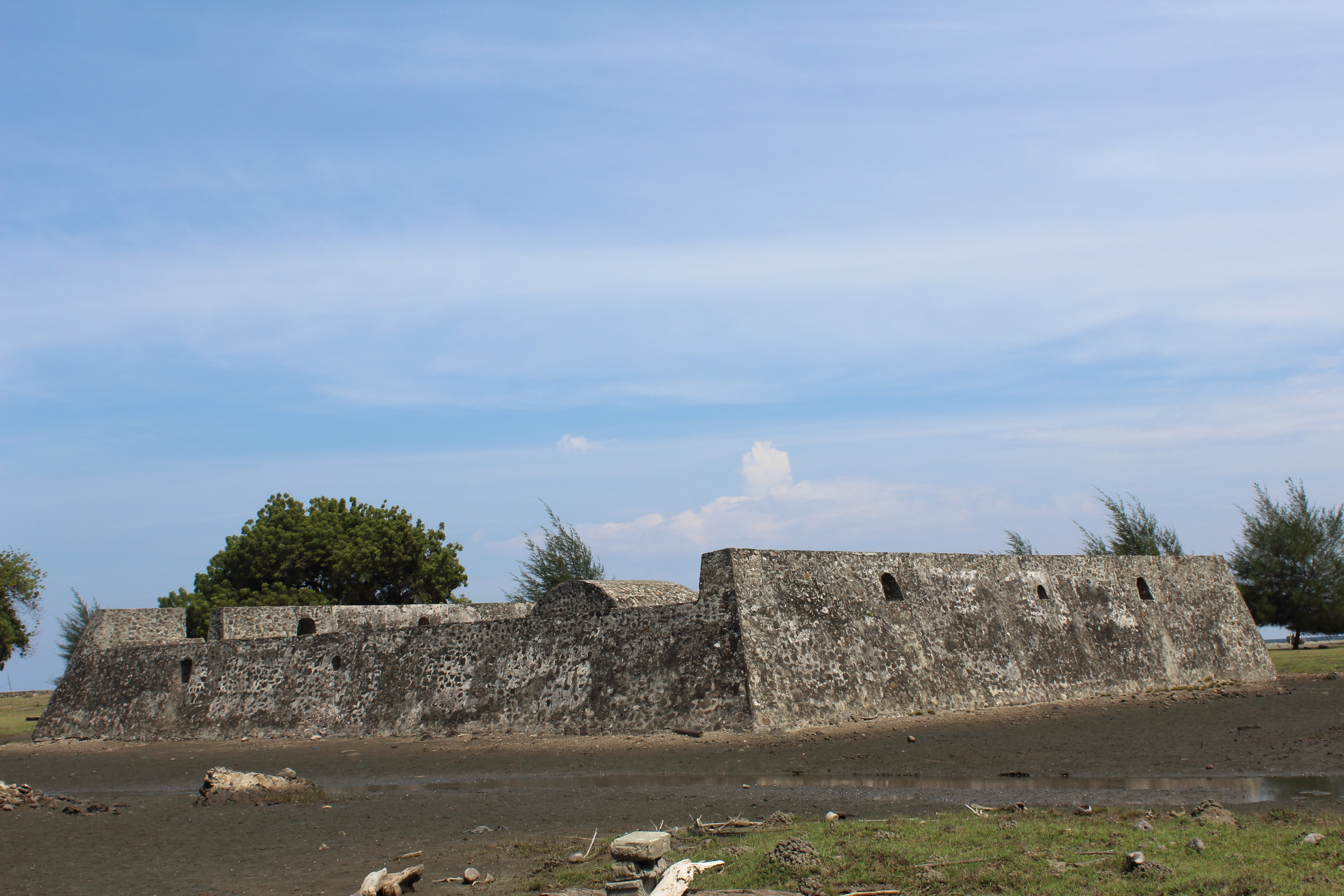
- Coastal fortress

Site information
- Type: fort

Site history
- Built: 7th-century (oldest fort); 17th-century (largest fort)
- Built by: Lamuri Kingdom (oldest fort); Acèh Darussalam (largest fort)
- Materials: Limestone

Indra Patra Fortress (Indonesian: Benteng Indra Patra), also known as Fort Indrapatra, refers to a cluster of forts in the village of Ladong, Mesjid Raya District, Aceh Besar Regency, Indonesia.

== History ==
Located around 20km northeast of Banda Aceh, the site of Indra Patra Fortress contains several structures. The oldest of the structures date to the 7th century and were built by the Hindu Lamuri Kingdom. The second, larger fortress measures 70 x 70 meters, and was built in the early 17th century during the reign of Iskandar Muda, the sultan of Acèh Darussalam. The second fortification served to protect Banda Aceh from the expanding Portuguese Empire.

The walls of the forts are made out of limestone, and testing has shown that they contain high levels of calcium. A third fort is also present at the site, but is in disrepair.

== Gallery ==
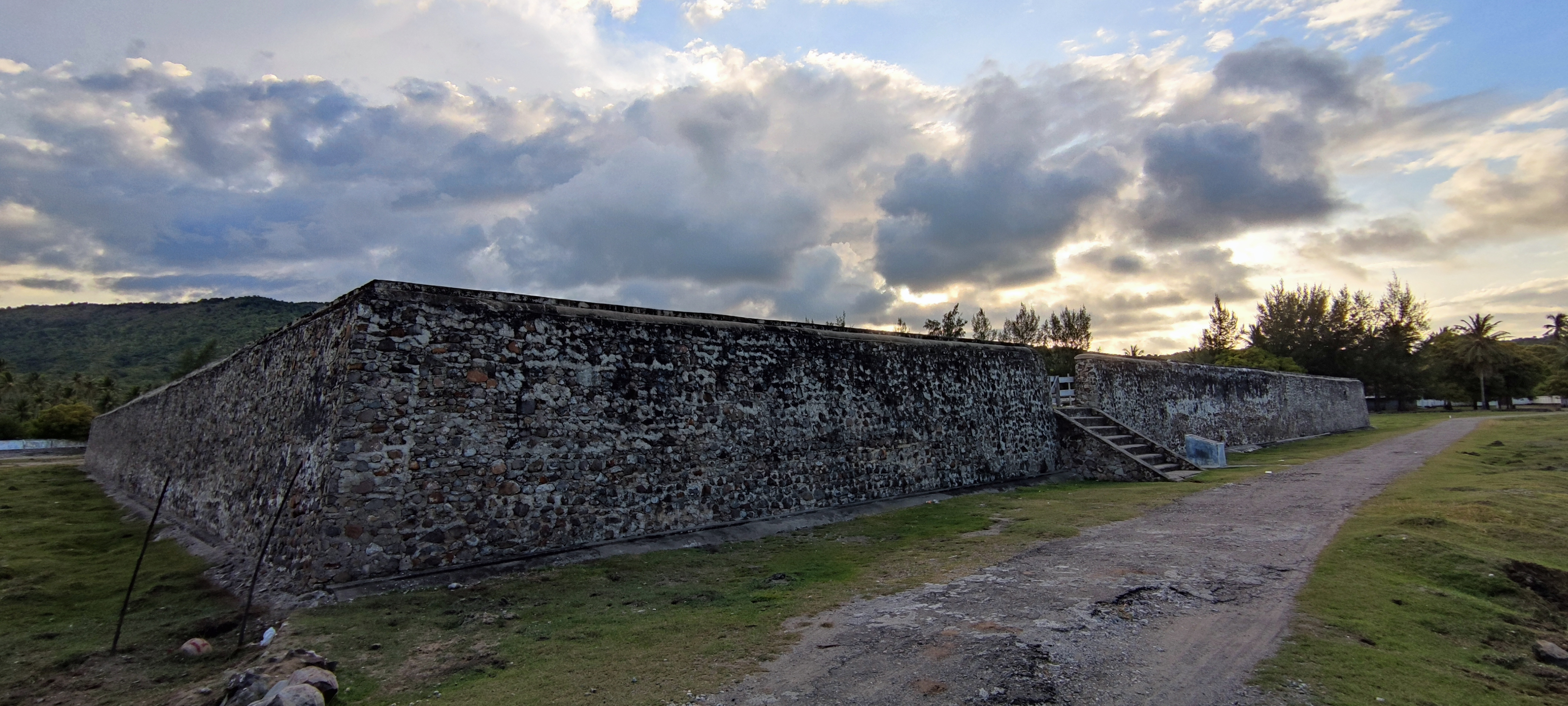
Main fortress

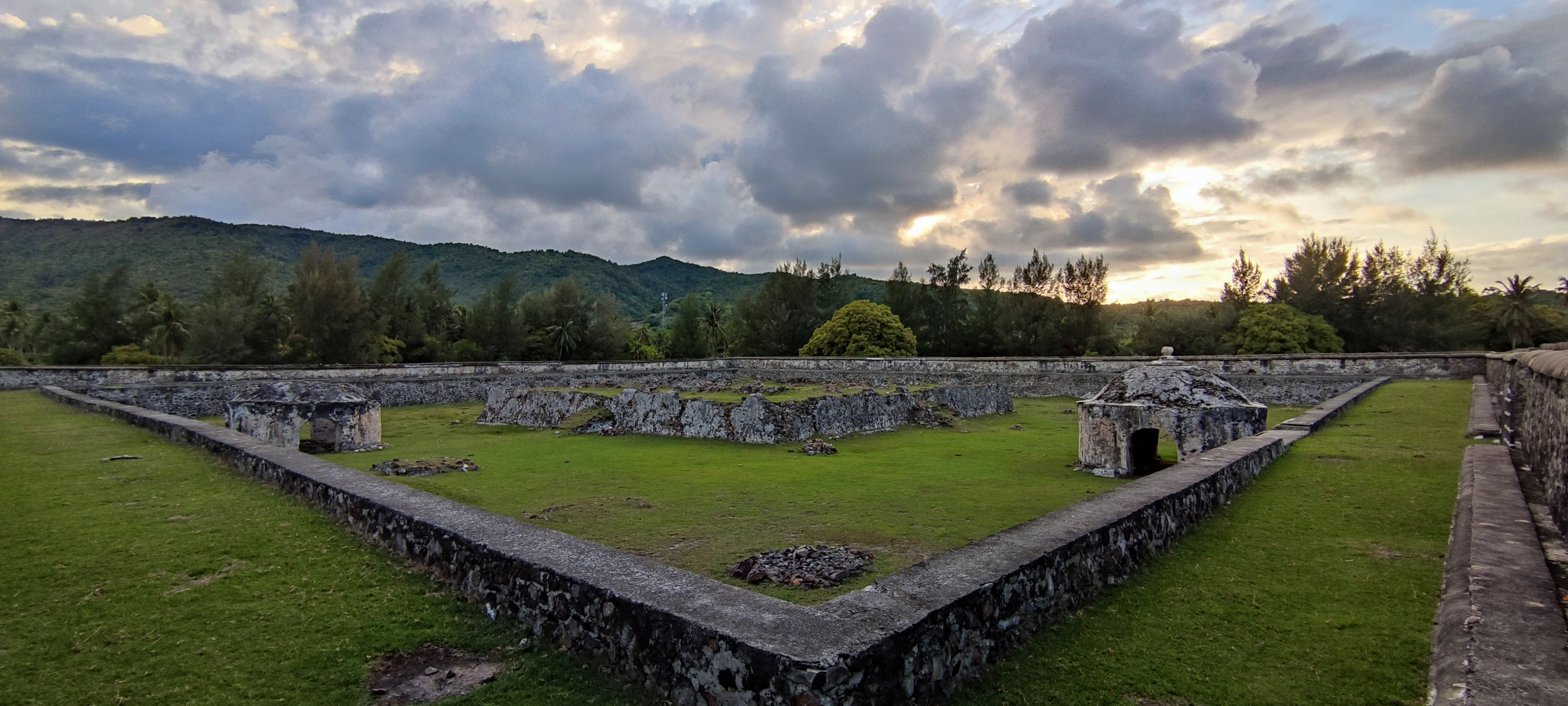
Main fortress interior

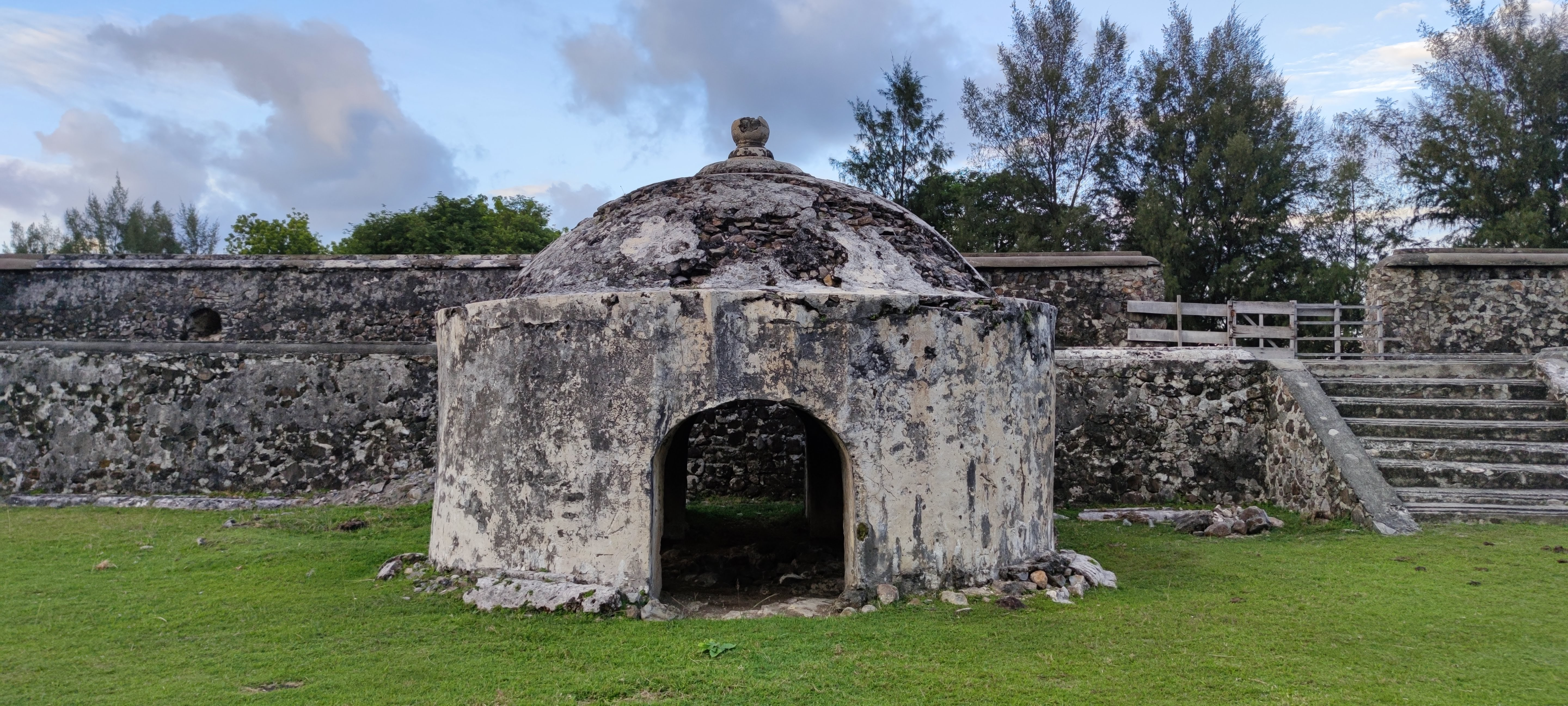
A dome structure inside main fortress

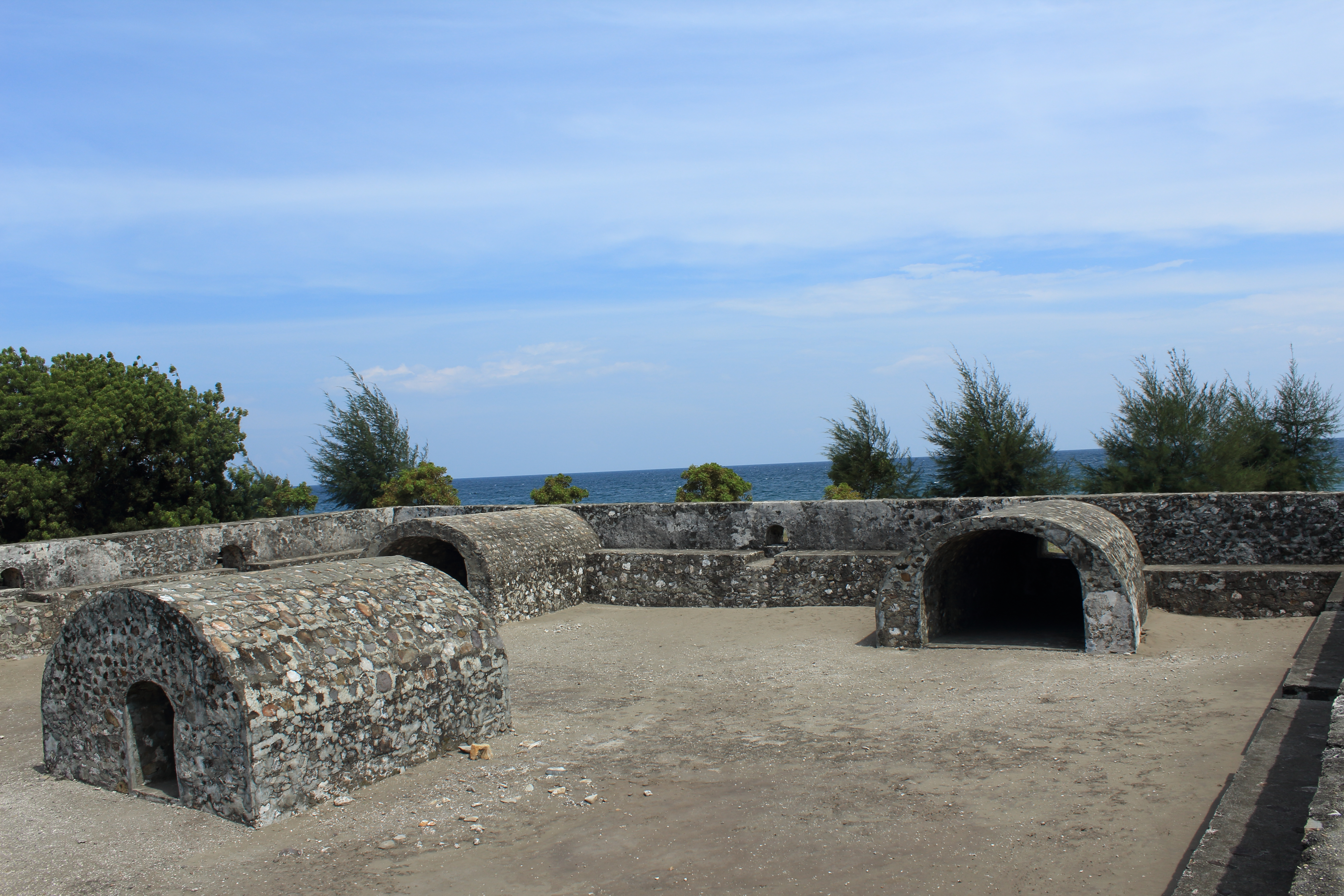
A structure inside coastal fortress
