= Cornelis de Houtman =

Dutch explorer (1565–1599)

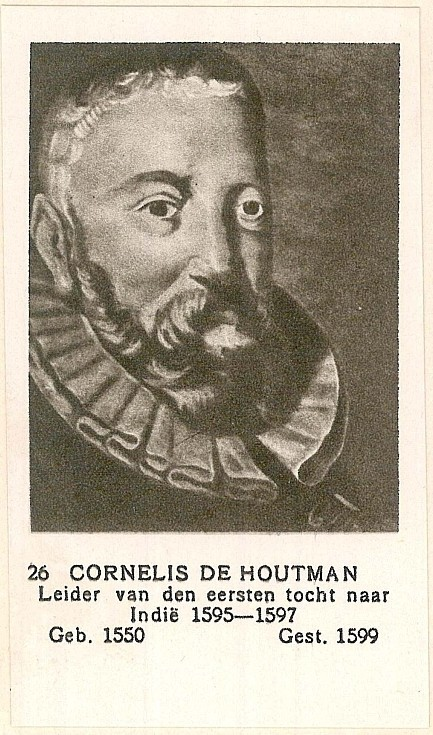
- Born: 2 April 1565; Gouda, South Holland, Seventeen Provinces
- Died: 11 September 1599 (aged 34); Banda Aceh, Sultanate of Aceh
- Occupation: Explorer
- Employer: Compagnie van Verre
- Relatives: Frederick de Houtman (brother)

Cornelis de Houtman (2 April 1565 – 11 September 1599) was a Dutch merchant seaman who commanded the first Dutch expedition to the East Indies. Although the voyage was difficult and yielded only a modest profit, Houtman showed that the Portuguese monopoly on the spice trade was vulnerable. A flurry of Dutch trading voyages followed, eventually leading to the displacement of the Portuguese and the establishment of a Dutch monopoly on spice trading in the East Indies.

== Early life ==
Cornelis de Houtman was born in 1565 in Gouda, South Holland. His father, Pieter de Houtman, was a brewer. Cornelis had a younger brother, Frederick de Houtman, born in 1571 and two sisters.

In 1592, Houtman's wealthy cousin, Reynier Pauw, and several other prosperous merchants in Amsterdam formed a company, Compagnie van Verre, to finance a Dutch trading expedition to the East Indies. Their initial inspiration had been the publication of a series of maps that appeared to show the route to the East Indies. These charts were provided by noted Dutch cartographer, Petrus Plancius, who indicated he had obtained them from Spain's royal cosmographer, Bartolomeo de Lasso.

That same year, Pauw sent Houtman to Lisbon along with his brother Frederick. It is unclear whether Houtman had legitimate business in Portugal or went primarily as a commercial spy to gather information about Portuguese spice trade in the East Indies. While they were gone, another Dutch merchant, Jan Huygen van Linschoten, returned to Amsterdam after spending almost nine years in Goa. He brought back extensive information about the region including crucial details on navigation and the spice trade.

== The voyage ==
The merchants determined that Bantam provided the best opportunity to buy spices. On 2 April 1595, four ships left Amsterdam: the Mauritius, Amsterdam, Hollandia, and the Duifje.

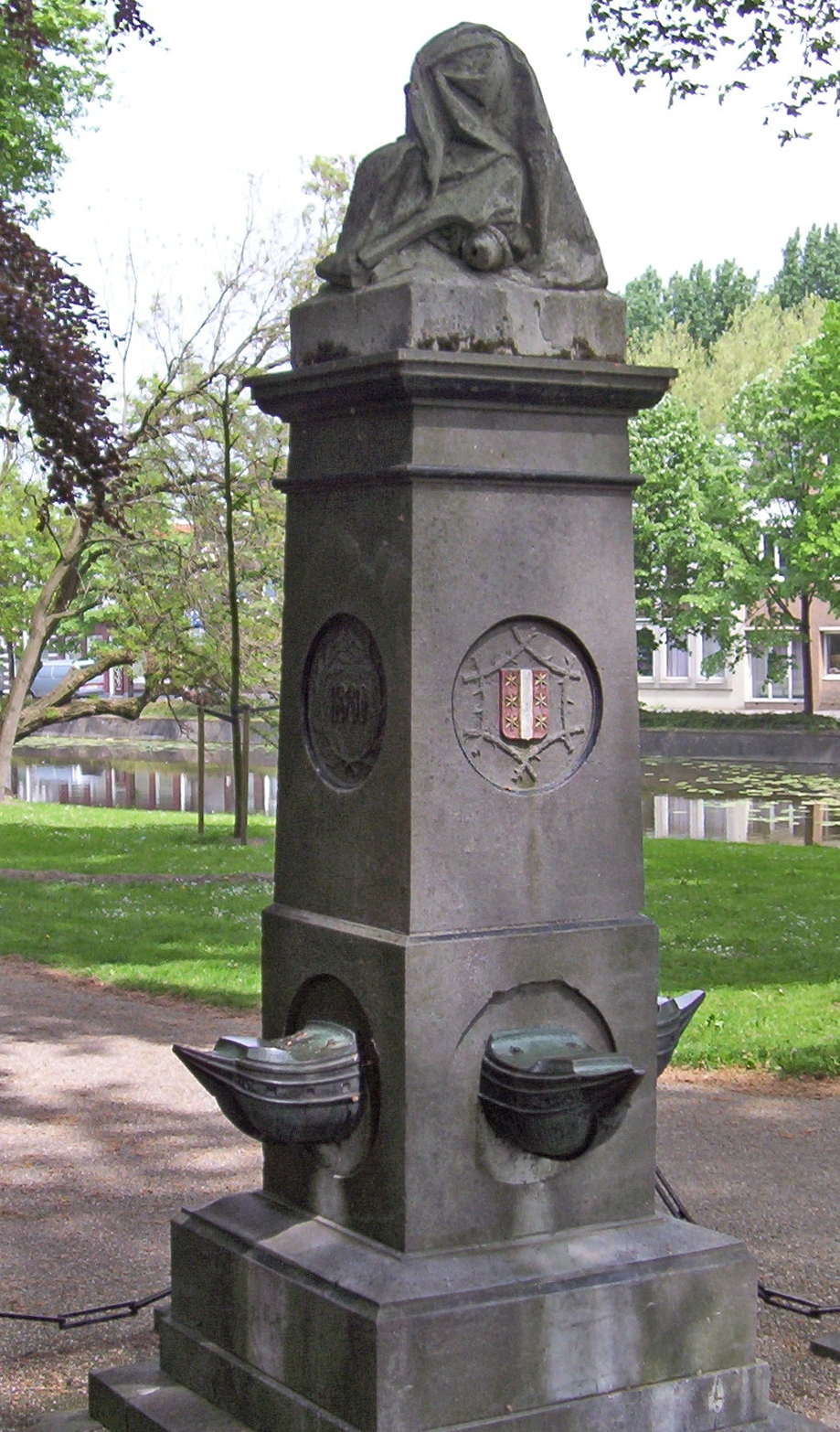
Monument to the De Houtman brothers in Gouda

The voyage was beset with trouble from the beginning. Scurvy broke out after only a few weeks, due to insufficient provisions. At Madagascar, where a brief stop was planned, seventy-one people had to be buried. The 71 of the 248 sailors had died, most of scurvy. The Madagascan bay where they were anchored is now known as the Dutch cemetery. After the death of one of the skippers, quarrels broke out among the captains and traders, one was imprisoned on board and locked up in his cabin. In June 1596, the ships finally arrived at Banten, a northwestern port at Java. Jan Huyghen van Linschoten had told them not to pass through the Malacca Strait, which was controlled by the Portuguese, but through Sunda Strait.

De Houtman was introduced to the Sultan of Banten, who promptly entered into an optimistic treaty with the Dutch, writing "We are well content to have a permanent league of alliance and friendship with His Highness the Prince Maurice of Nassau, of the Netherlands and with you, gentlemen." The local Portuguese traders became very suspicious when De Houtman did not buy any black pepper, and wanted to wait on the next harvest. Unfortunately, De Houtman was undiplomatic and insulting to the sultan, and was turned away for "rude behaviour", without being able to buy spices at all.

The ships then sailed east to Madura, but were attacked by pirates on the way. In Madura, they were received peacefully, but De Houtman ordered his men to brutally attack and rape the civilian population in revenge for the unrelated earlier piracy.

The ships then sailed for Bali, and met with the island's king. They managed to obtain a few pots of peppercorns on 26 February 1597. Two of the crewmembers stayed on the island. At Bawean one of the ships, the Amsterdam was purposely set on fire, and the crew divided over the other three ships. When the sailors had enough of the exhausting voyage, it was decided not to go to the Moluccas and return to Holland. That evening another one of the skippers died. De Houtman was accused of poisoning him.

Portuguese ships prevented them from taking on water and supplies at Saint Helena. Out of the 249 men crew, only 87 returned, too weak to moor their ships themselves.

== Death ==
Though the trip was a humanitarian disaster and financially probably just broke even, it was a symbolic victory. It may be regarded as the start of the Dutch colonisation of Indonesia. Within five years, 65 more Dutch ships had sailed east to trade. Soon, the Dutch would fully take over the spice trade in and around the Indian Ocean.

On his second trip to the East in 1599, for a different company, De Houtman and his troops arrived in Aceh. The Sultan accepted him peacefully until de Houtman insulted him. He had already clashed with the Banten Sultanate in northwest Java before his arrival in Aceh, and, feeling arrogant, escalated the situation by challenging the Sultan. This led to his defeat at the hands of the first woman admiral in modern world, Admiral Keumalahayati, and her Inong Balee Army.
