= Aceh River =

Coordinates: 5.3512726°N 95.5623695°E

Aceh River Krueng Aceh
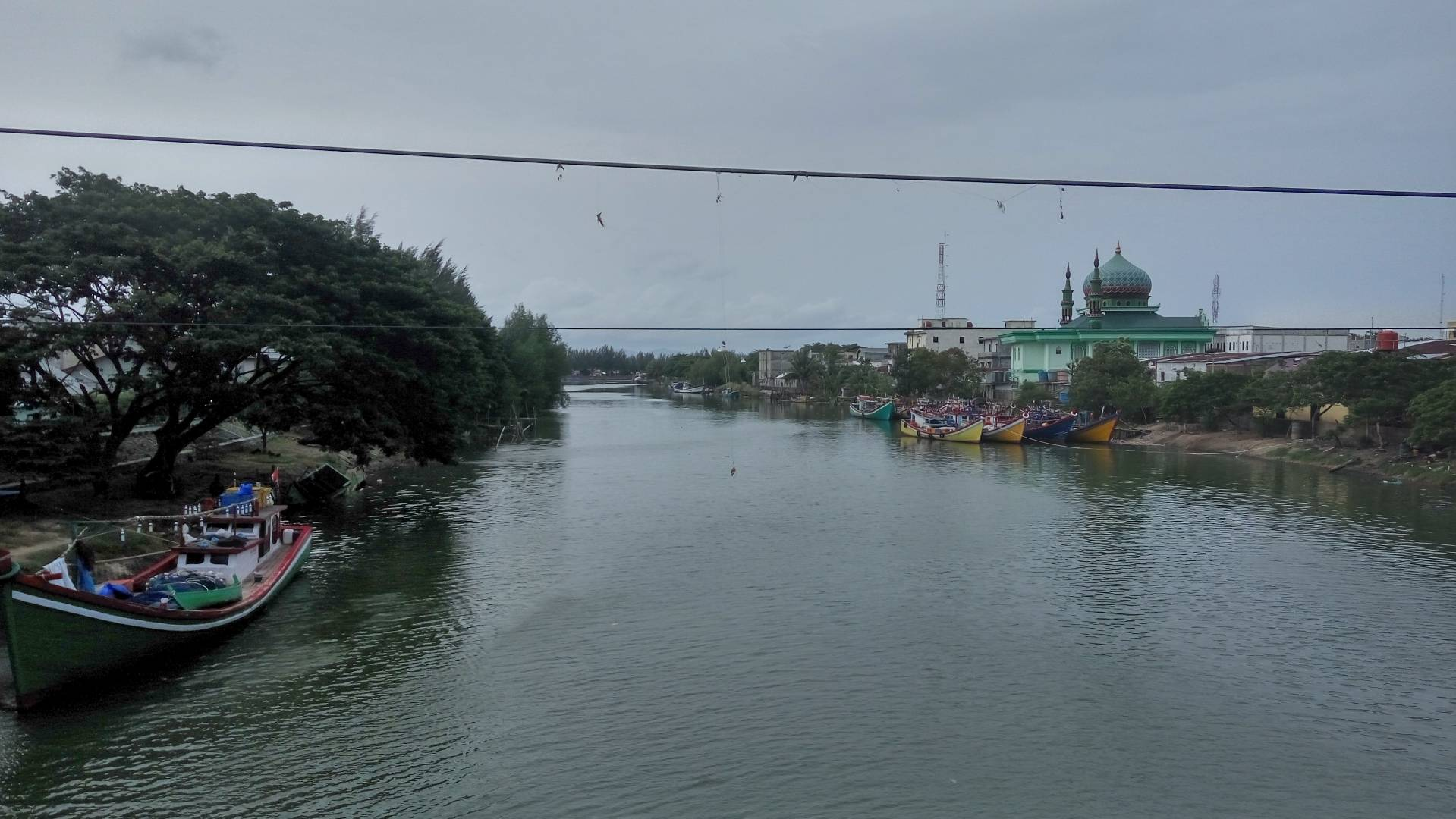
- Aceh river in Peunayong, Banda Aceh

- Location of river mouth Aceh River (Sumatra) Aceh River (Indonesia)

Location
- Country: Indonesia
- Province: Aceh

Physical characteristics
- Length: 145 km (90 mi)

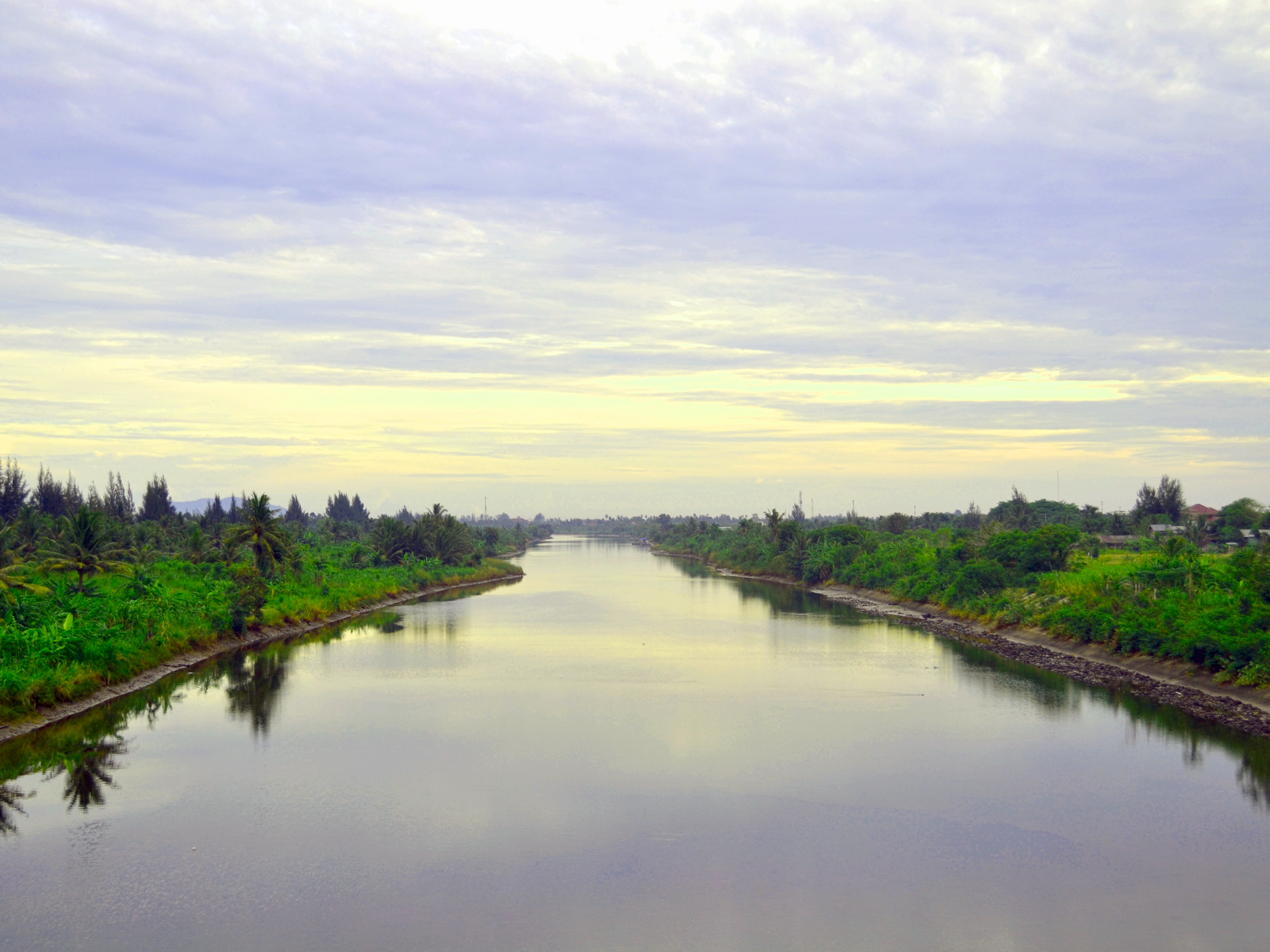
The Aceh River floodway

The Aceh River on the island of Sumatra in Indonesia flows from mountains that include the 2,780-metre high Mount Peuët Sagoë for some 200 kilometres northeastward to reach the junction of the Indian Ocean and the Andaman Sea at Banda Aceh, the capital of Indonesia's westernmost Aceh province. The river has a catchment area of some 1775 square kilometres.

The river has a flow of up to 30,000 cubic meters per second. This enormous flow frequently flooded Banda Aceh and the land upstream from the town.

== Flood prevention ==
The Japanese Government provided Indonesia an aid package to reduce flooding. From 1986 to 1992 the Japanese consultants Pacific Consultants International with Japanese, South Korean and Indonesian contractors reconstructed the river's seaward-end 25 kilometres and built a diversion channel almost entirely preventing flooding.

The British civil engineer Peter Hines was the coordinator for the six years of documentation and meetings agreed to be in English for the Indonesian, Japanese, and Korean languages needed on site and in Djakarta, the capital city of Indonesia. By the 1980s, the English language had recently become the world's business lingua franca.

50 kilometres of 8-metre plastic mattresses were woven in Heathcoat Fabrics' factory in Tiverton, England, and on site sewn together and filled with grout to line the sandy river banks.

The project included 12 bridges (designed to span the enormous seaward river flow): 11 survived undamaged the 26 December 2004 undersea 9.3-magnitude earthquake and tsunami that killed some 31,000 Banda Aceh people and swept water up some 40 kilometres of the river. The 12th bridge (the closest bridge to the sea) collapsed because it had a single pre-cast beam as it was only a pedestrian bridge linking two fishing villages (these villages were completely destroyed by the tsunami).

After President Suharto had made a speech at the opening ceremony, he was asked by an 80-year-old man if another bridge could be built to reduce the distance he cycled to his farmland. The President replied "Carry on cycling and you will live for ever!".

== See also ==
- List of drainage basins of Indonesia
- List of rivers of Indonesia
- List of rivers of Sumatra
