= Postal codes in Indonesia =

Postal codes in Indonesia, known in Indonesian as kode pos, consist of 5 digits.

- The first digit indicates the region in which a given post office falls in,
- The second and third digits indicate the regency (kabupaten) or city (kota madya),
- The fourth digit indicates the district or kecamatan within the kabupaten or kota,
- The fifth digit indicates the commune or village or kelurahan/desa.

There is an exception for Jakarta postal codes:

- The third digit indicates the district (kecamatan)
- The fourth digit indicates the urban village (kelurahan)
- The fifth digit is a "0".

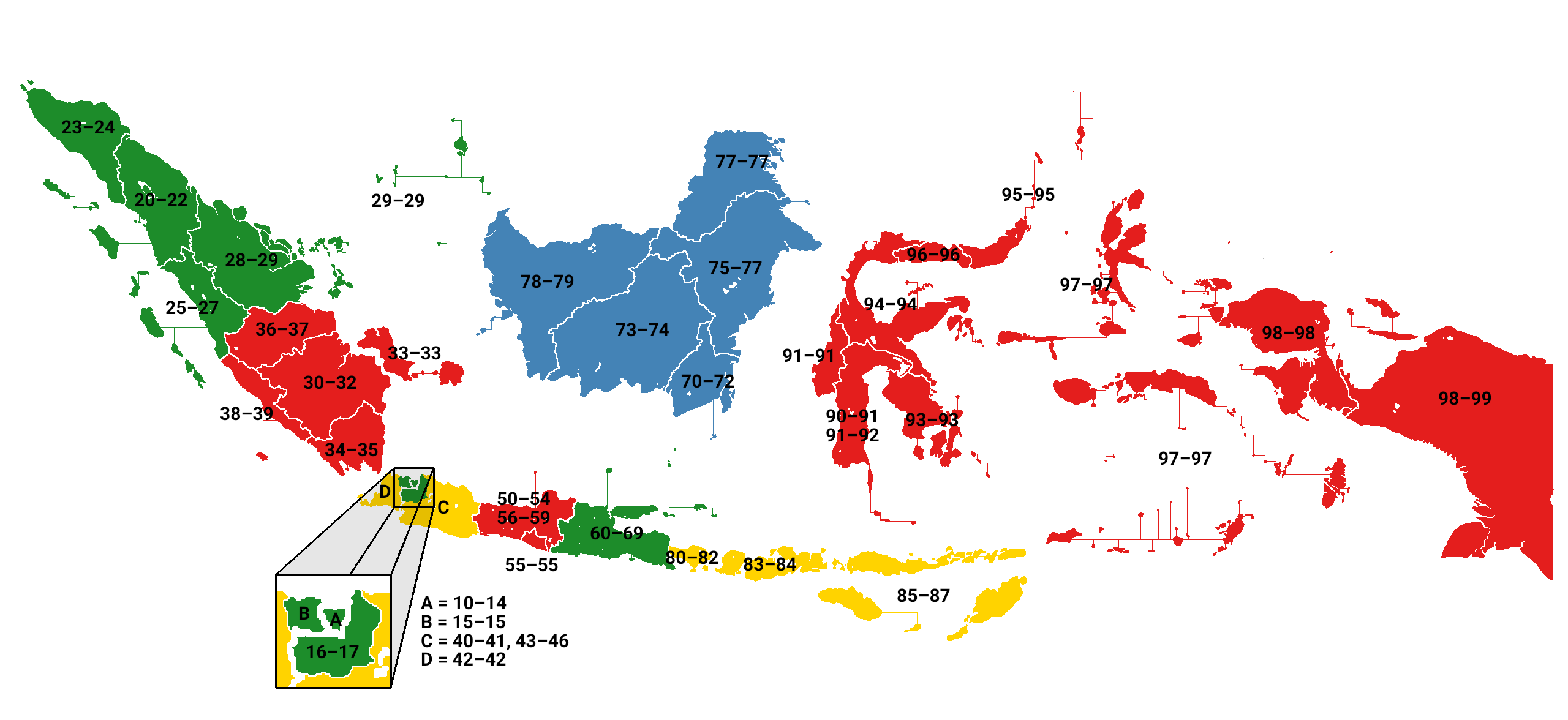
Postal code by province

There are postal code zones covering the Indonesian provinces or islands as follows:

First digit	Postal zone
1	Jakarta metropolitan area
2	Northern half of Sumatra, comprising the provinces of Aceh, North Sumatra, West Sumatra, Riau and Riau Islands.
3	Southern half of Sumatra, comprising the provinces of Bengkulu, Jambi, Bangka Belitung, South Sumatra and Lampung.
4	The provinces of Banten and West Java (except those parts within the Jakarta metropolitan area).
5	The province of Central Java and the Yogyakarta Special Region.
6	The province of East Java.
7	Kalimantan (the Indonesian part of Borneo island).
8	The provinces of Bali, West Nusa Tenggara and East Nusa Tenggara (the Lesser Sunda Islands).
9	Sulawesi (Celebes), Maluku (Moluccas), and Papua (Western New Guinea).
