= Ulee Geudong, Sawang =

Ulee Geudong
- Village in North Aceh
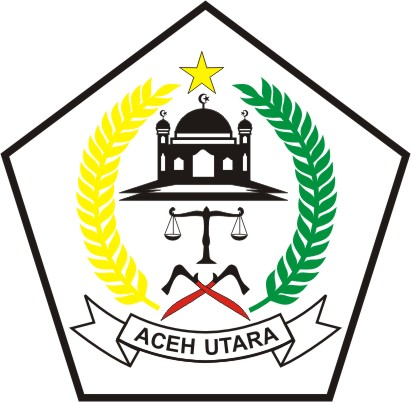
- Etymology: Acehnese
- Nickname: UG
- Interactive map of Ulee Geudong
- Coordinates: 5.221780°N 96.966315°E
- Country: Indonesia
- Province: Aceh
- Regency: North Aceh
- Subdistrict: Sawang

Ulee Geudong is a village in subdistrict Sawang, North Aceh Regency, Aceh province, Indonesia. The main occupations in Gampong Ulee Geudong are farming, gardening and breeding livestock. The village is located on the Jalan Elak (Bypass) Krueng Mane - Buket Rata 7–8 km Lhokseumawe and is very close to the Malikussaleh Airport as well as the Malikussaleh University.

== Geographical Region ==
- The western side is bordered by the Tanjong Keumala
- The eastern side is bordered by the Cot Keumuneng & Paya Dua
- The North side is bordered by the Paloh Awe and Pinto Makmur
- The South side is bordered by the Cot Lambideng.

Gampong Ulee Geudong has 4 hamlets, including:

- Dusun Teue
- Dusun Cot Mesjid
- Dusun Geutah
- Dusun Pulo Teungoh

== Worship facilities ==
Religious facilities in the village of Ulee Geudong:

- Mosque (Masjid Babuttaqwa) 1
- Meunasah / Mushalla 4
- Dayah / Islamic School 4

== Educational facilities ==
The people of Ulee Geudong believe that education is the key to creating a generation of competitive, innovative, creative and reliable young people and consequently foster a generation that is educated, ethical, and of a certain generous character. The village is not particularly wealthy and so it has requested support for the needs of its public education system from either the government or NGOs.

At present, these educational facilities are available:

- Kindergarten (TK / RA) 1
- Elementary School (SD State 13 Sawang) 1

== Professional Society ==
The majority of people in Ulee Geudong make their living as farmers or gardeners. Women in the village usually practice a craft like ayaman mat, sewing, or making bags and wallets. There are some cooperatives engaged in handicraft making purses and bags in the style typical of Aceh.

== Commodities ==
The main commodities produced in Ulee Geudong are;

- Rice
- Coconuts
- Areca nuts
- Cocoa
- Candlenuts
