= Energy in Indonesia =

Total energy supply 2021
1. Coal (30.3%)
2. Oil (28.9%)
3. Biofuels and Waste (13.8%)
4. Natural gas (14.4%)
5. Wind, Solar, etc. (11.6%)
6. Hydro (0.90%)

Energy consumption by source, Indonesia

Development of CO_{2} emissions

In 2019, the total energy production in Indonesia is 450.79 million tonnes of oil equivalent, with a total primary energy supply of 231.14 million tonnes of oil equivalent and electricity final consumption of 263.32 terawatt-hours. From 2000 to 2021, Indonesia's total energy supply increased by nearly 60%.

Energy use in Indonesia has been long dominated by fossil resources. Once a major oil exporter that joined OPEC in 1962, the country has since become a net oil importer despite still being in OPEC until 2008 and for a short time in 2016, making it the only net oil importer member in the organization. Indonesia is also one of the world's largest coal producers and exporters. In 2024, it was the world's third-largest coal producer, with output increasing to 836 million tonnes. In the same year, Indonesia remained the world's largest coal exporter, exporting 555 million tonnes of coal, primarily thermal coal. Indonesia's coal reserves reached 31.95 billion tonnes in 2024, according to data from the Ministry of Energy and Mineral Resources. In addition, Indonesia has abundant renewable energy potential of 417,8 gigawatt (GW), including solar, wind, hydro, geothermal energy, ocean current, and bioenergy, although only 2,5% have been utilized. Furthermore, Indonesia along with Malaysia, have two-thirds of ASEAN's gas reserves with a total annual gas production of more than 200 billion cubic meters in 2016.

The Government of Indonesia has outlined several commitments to increase clean energy use and reduce greenhouse gas emissions, among other things by issuing the National Energy General Plan (RUEN) in 2017 and joining the Paris Agreement. In the RUEN, Indonesia targets New and Renewable Energy to reach 23% of the total energy mix by 2025 and 31% by 2050. The country also commits to reduce its greenhouse gas emissions by 29% by 2030 against a business-as-usual baseline scenario, and up to 41% by international support. It also has committed to phasing out coal power by 2040s, although numerous challenges remain

Some major renewable projects in Indonesia include the 75 MW wind farm in Sidenreng Rappang Regency, another 72 MW wind farm in Jeneponto Regency, and the Cirata Floating Solar Power Plant in West Java with a capacity of 145 MW which will become the largest Floating Solar Power Plant in Southeast Asia.

== Overview ==
Energy in Indonesia
	Population (million)	Primary energy (TWh)	Production (TWh)	Export (TWh)	Electricity (TWh)	CO_{2}-emission (Mt)
2004	217.6	2,024	3,001	973	104	336
2007	225.6	2,217	3,851	1,623	127	377
2008	228.3	2,311	4,035	1,714	134	385
2009	230.0	2,349	4,092	1,787	140	376
2010	239.9	2,417	4,436	2,007	154	411
2012	242.3	2,431	4,589	2,149	166	426
2012R	246.9	2,484	5,120	2,631	181	435
2013	250.0	2,485	5,350	2,858	198	425
Change 2004-10	10.2%	19.4%	48%	106%	48%	22%
Mtoe = 11.63 TWh 2012R = CO_{2} calculation criteria changed, numbers updated

According to the IEA, energy production increased 34% and export 76% from 2004 to 2008 in Indonesia. In 2017, Indonesia had 52,859 MW of installed electrical capacity, 36,892 MW of which were on the Java–Bali grid. In 2022, Indonesia had an electrical capacity of 81.2 GW with a projected capacity of 85.1 GW for 2023.

In 2024, Indonesia's primary energy supply was dominated by coal at 40.37%, followed by petroleum at 28.82%, natural gas at 16.17% and renewable energy at 14.65%.

== Energy by sources ==
=== Fossil fuel energy sources ===
==== Coal ====
Coal supplies a large share of energy in Indonesia. The world's largest coal exporter, the country plays a significant role in the global coal market, primarily serving Asian countries such as China, India and Japan.

==== Oil ====
Indonesia used to be a net oil exporter.

Oil is a major sector in the Indonesian economy. During the 1980s, Indonesia was a significant oil-exporting country. Since 2000, domestic consumption has continued to rise while production has been falling, so in recent years Indonesia has begun importing increasing amounts of oil. Within Indonesia, there are considerable amounts of oil in Sumatra, Borneo, Java, and West Papua Province. There are said to be around 60 basins across the country, only 22 of which have been explored and exploited. Main oil fields in Indonesia include the following:

- Minas. The Minas field, in Riau, Sumatra, operated by the US-based firm Chevron Pacific Indonesia, is the largest oil block in Indonesia. Output from the field is around 20-25% of current annual oil production in Indonesia.
- Duri. The Duri field, in Bengkalis Regency, Riau, Sumatra, is operated by the US-based firm Chevron Pacific Indonesia.
- Rokan. The Rokan field, Riau, Sumatra, operated by Chevron Pacific Indonesia, is a recently developed large field in the Rokan Hilir Regency.
- Cepu. The Cepu field, operated by Mobil Cepu Ltd which is a subsidiary of US-based ExxonMobil, is on the border of Central and East Java near the town of Tuban. The field was discovered in March 2001 and is estimated to have proven reserves of 600 million barrels of oil and 1.7 trillion cu feet of gas. Development of the field has been subject to on-going discussions between the operators and the Indonesian government. Output is forecast to rise from around 20,000 bpd in early 2012 to around 165,000 bpd in late 2014.

Oil Production 2011-2023 (kb/d)
2011	2012	2013	2014	2015	2016	2017	2018	2019	2020	2021	2022	2023
952	917	871	847	838	873	837	808	781	742	692	647	641

==== Gas ====
Indonesia's gas balance

Indonesia's proved natural gas reserves stood at 49.7 trillion cubic feet in 2021. There is growing recognition in Indonesia that the gas sector has considerable development potential. The Indonesian government is increasingly prioritizing investment in natural gas. However, in practice, investors, especially foreign investors, have been reluctant to invest because many of the problems that are holding back investment in the oil sector also affect investment in gas.

Natural gas Production 2011-2023 (billion cubic metres)
2011	2012	2013	2014	2015	2016	2017	2018	2019	2020	2021	2022	2023
82.7	78.3	77.6	76.4	76.2	75.1	72.7	72.8	67.6	59.5	59.3	62.8	64.3

As of mid-2013, the main potential gas fields in Indonesia were believed to include the following:

- Mahakam. The Mahakam block in East Kalimantan, under the management of Total E&P Indonesie with participation from the Japanese oil and gas firm Inpex, produces around 30% of Indonesia's natural gas output. In mid 2013 the field was reported to be producing around 1.7 billion ft^{3} (48 million m^{3}) per day of gas as well as 67,000 barrels (10,700 m^{3}) of condensate. At the time discussions were underway about the details of the future management of the block involving a proposal that Pertamina take over all or part of the management of the block. In October 2013 it was reported that Total E&P Indonesie had announced that it would stop exploration for new projects at the field. In 2015, the Energy and Resources Minister issued a regulation stipulating that the management of the block would be transferred from Total E&P Indonesie and Inpex, which had managed the field for over 50 years since 1966, to Pertamina. In late 2017, it was announced that Pertamina Hulu Indonesia, a subsidiary of Pertamina, would take over management of the block on 1 January 2018.
- Tangguh. The Tangguh field in Bintuni Bay in West Papua Province operated by BP (British Petroleum) is estimated to have proven gas reserves of 4.4 trillion ft^{3} (120 billion m^{3}). It is hoped that annual output of the field in the near future might reach 7.6 million tons of liquefied natural gas.
- Arun. The Arun field in Aceh has been operated by ExxonMobil since the 1970s. The reserves at the field are now largely depleted so production is gradually being phased out. At its peak, the Arun field produced around 3.4 billion ft^{3} (96 million m^{3}) of gas per day (1994) and about 130,000 of condensate per day (1989). ExxonMobil affiliates also operate the nearby South Lhoksukon A and D fields as well as the North Sumatra offshore gas field. In September 2015, ExxonMobil Indonesia sold its assets in Aceh to Pertamina. The sale included the divestment by ExxonMobil of its assets (100%) in the North Sumatra Offshore block, its interests (100%) in B block, and its stake (30%) in the PT Arun Natural Gas Liquefaction (NGL) plant. Following the completion of the deal, Pertamina will have an 85% stake in the Arun NGL plant.
- East Natuna. The East Natuna gas field (formerly known as Natuna D-Alpha) in the Natuna Islands in the South China Sea is believed to be one of the biggest gas reserves in Southeast Asia. It is estimated to have proven reserves of 46 trillion ft^{3} (1.3 trillion m^{3}) of gas. The aim is to begin expanded production in 2020 with production rising to 4,000 million cu ft/d (110 million m^{3}/d) sustained for perhaps 20 years.
- Banyu Urip. The Banyu Urip field, a major Indonesian gas field, is in the Cepu block in Bojonegoro Regency in East Java. Interests in the block are held by Pertamina (45%) through its subsidiary PT Pertamina EP Cepu and ExxonMobil Cepu Limited (45%) which is a subsidiary of ExxonMobil Corporation. ExxonMobil is the operator of the block.
- Masela. The Masela field, currently (early 2016) under consideration for development by the Indonesian Government, is situated to the east of Timor Island, roughly halfway between Timor and Darwin in Australia. The main investors in the field are currently (early 2016) Inpex and Shell who hold stakes of 65% and 35% respectively. The field, if developed, is likely to become the biggest deepwater gas project in Indonesia, involving an estimated investment of between $14–19 billion. Over 10 trillion ft^{3} (280 billion m^{3}) of gas are said to exist in the block. However, development of the field is being delayed over uncertainty as to whether the field might be operated through an offshore or onshore processing facility. In March 2016, after a row between his ministers, President Jokowi decreed that the processing facility should be onshore. This change of plans will cause greatly increased costs and will delay the start of the project. It was proposed that the investors submit revised Plans of Development (POD) to the Indonesian Government.
- See also List of gas fields in Indonesia.

==== Shale ====
There is potential for tight oil and shale gas in northern Sumatra and eastern Kalimantan. There is an estimated 46 trillion ft^{3} (1.3 trillion m^{3}) of shale gas and 7.9 billion barrels (1.26×10^{9} m^{3}) of shale oil which could be recovered with existing technologies. Pertamina has taken the lead in using hydraulic fracturing to explore for shale gas in northern Sumatra. Chevron Pacific Indonesia and NuEnergy Gas are also pioneers in using fracking in existing oil fields and in new exploration. Environmental concerns and a government-imposed cap on oil prices present barriers to full development of the substantial shale deposits in the country. Sulawesi, Seram, Buru, Papua in eastern Indonesia have shales that were deposited in marine environments which may be more brittle and thus more suitable for fracking than the source rocks in western Indonesia which have higher clay content.

This underground coal mine in South Kalimantan is expected to become a major source of CMM emissions.

==== Coal bed methane ====
With 453 trillion ft^{3} (12.8 trillion m^{3}) of coal bed methane (CBM) reserve mainly in Kalimantan and Sumatra, Indonesia has potential to redraft its energy charts as United States with its shale gas. With low enthusiasm to develop CBM project, partly in relation to environmental concern regarding emissions of greenhouse gases and contamination of water in the extraction process, the government targeted 8.9 million ft^{3} (250 thousand m^{3}) per day at standard pressure for 2015.

=== Renewable energy sources ===
Indonesia renewable electricity production by source

Indonesia aims to get 23% and 31% of its energy from renewable sources by 2025 and 2050 respectively. In 2020, renewables has a 11.2% share of the national energy mix, with hydro and geothermal power making up most of this. Despite its renewable energy potential, Indonesia is struggling to reach its renewable target. The lack of adequate regulation supports to attract the private sector and the regulation inconsistency are often cited among the main reasons for the lack of progress. One policy requires private investors to transfer their projects to PLN (the sole electricity off-taker in the country) at the end of agreement periods, which, combined with the fact that the Minister for Energy and Mineral Resources sets the consumer price of energy, has led to concern about return on investment.

Another issue is related to financing, as to achieve the 23% renewable energy target, it has been estimated that Indonesia needs to invest US$154 billion. The state is unable to raise so much capital, while there is reluctance from both potential investors and lending banks to get involved. There is also a critical challenge related to cost. Renewable energy projects is still require large up-front investment and as the electricity price has to be below the Region Generation Cost (BPP) (which is already low enough in some major areas), it renders projects economically unattractive. Indonesia also has large coal reserves and is one of the world's largest net exporters of coal, making it less urgent to develop renewable-based power plants compared to countries that depend on coal imports.

The country has been recommended to remove subsidies for fossil fuels, establish a ministry of renewable energy, improve grid management, expand its grid connections with neighboring countries through the ASEAN power grid, mobilize domestic resources to support renewable energy, and facilitate entry for international investors. Continued reliance on fossil fuels by Indonesia may leave its coal assets stranded and result in significant investments lost as renewable energy is rapidly becoming cost-efficient worldwide.

In February 2020, it was announced that the People's Consultative Assembly is preparing its first renewable energy bill.

==== Biomass ====
An estimated 55% of Indonesia's population, 128 million people, primarily rely upon traditional biomass (mainly wood) for cooking. Reliance on this source of energy has the disadvantage that poor people in rural areas have little alternative but to collect timber from forests, and often cut down trees, to collect wood for cooking.

A pilot project of Palm Oil Mill Effluent (POME) Power Generator with the capacity of 1 Megawatt has been inaugurated in September 2014.

==== Hydroelectricity ====
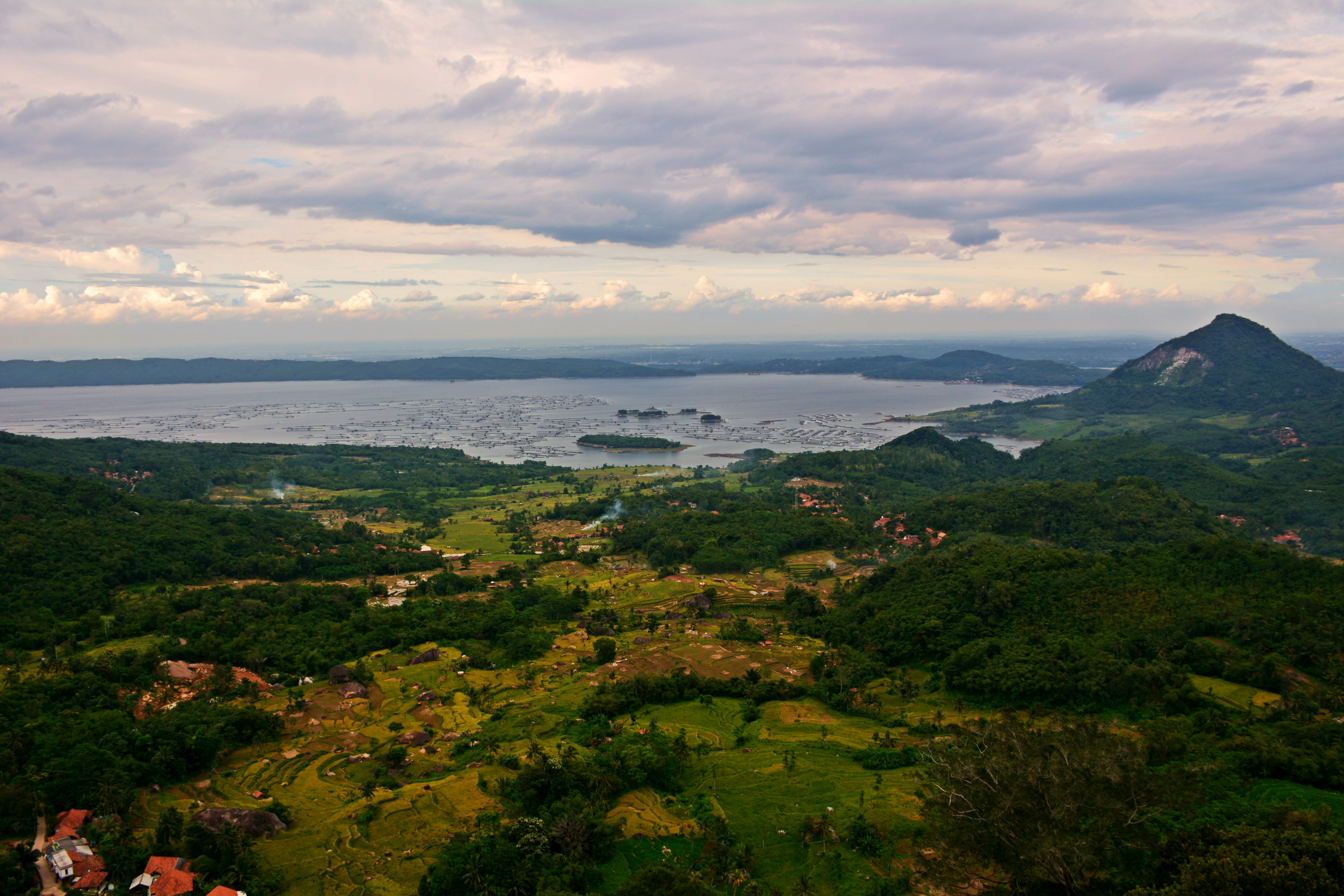
Jatiluhur Dam, Indonesia's first and largest dam, in Purwakarta Regency, West Java.

Indonesia has 75 GW of hydro potential, although only around 5 GW has been utilized. Currently, only 34GW of Indonesia's total hydro potential can feasibly be utilized due to high development costs in certain areas. Indonesia also set a target of 2 GW installed capacity in hydroelectricity, including 0.43 GW micro-hydro, by 2025. Indonesia has a potential of around 459.91 MW for micro hydropower developments, with only 4.54% of it being currently exploited.

==== Geothermal energy ====
Indonesia uses some geothermal energy. According to the Renewable Energy Policy Network's Renewables 2013 Global Status Report, Indonesia has the third largest installed generating capacity in the world. With 1.3 GW installed capacity, Indonesia trails only the United States (3.4 GW) and the Philippines (1.9 GW), ahead of Mexico (1.0 GW), Italy (0.9 GW), New Zealand (0.8 GW), Iceland (0.7 GW), and Japan (0.5 GW). The current official policy is to encourage the increased use of geothermal energy for electricity production. Geothermal sites in Indonesia include the Wayang Windu Geothermal Power Station and the Kamojang plant, both in West Java.

The development of the sector has been proceeding rather more slowly than hoped. Expansion appears to be held up by a range of technical, economic, and policy issues which have attracted considerable comment in Indonesia. However, it has proved difficult to formulate policies to respond to the problems.

Two new plants are slated to open in 2020, at Dieng Volcanic Complex in Central Java and at Mount Patuha in West Java.

==== Wind power ====
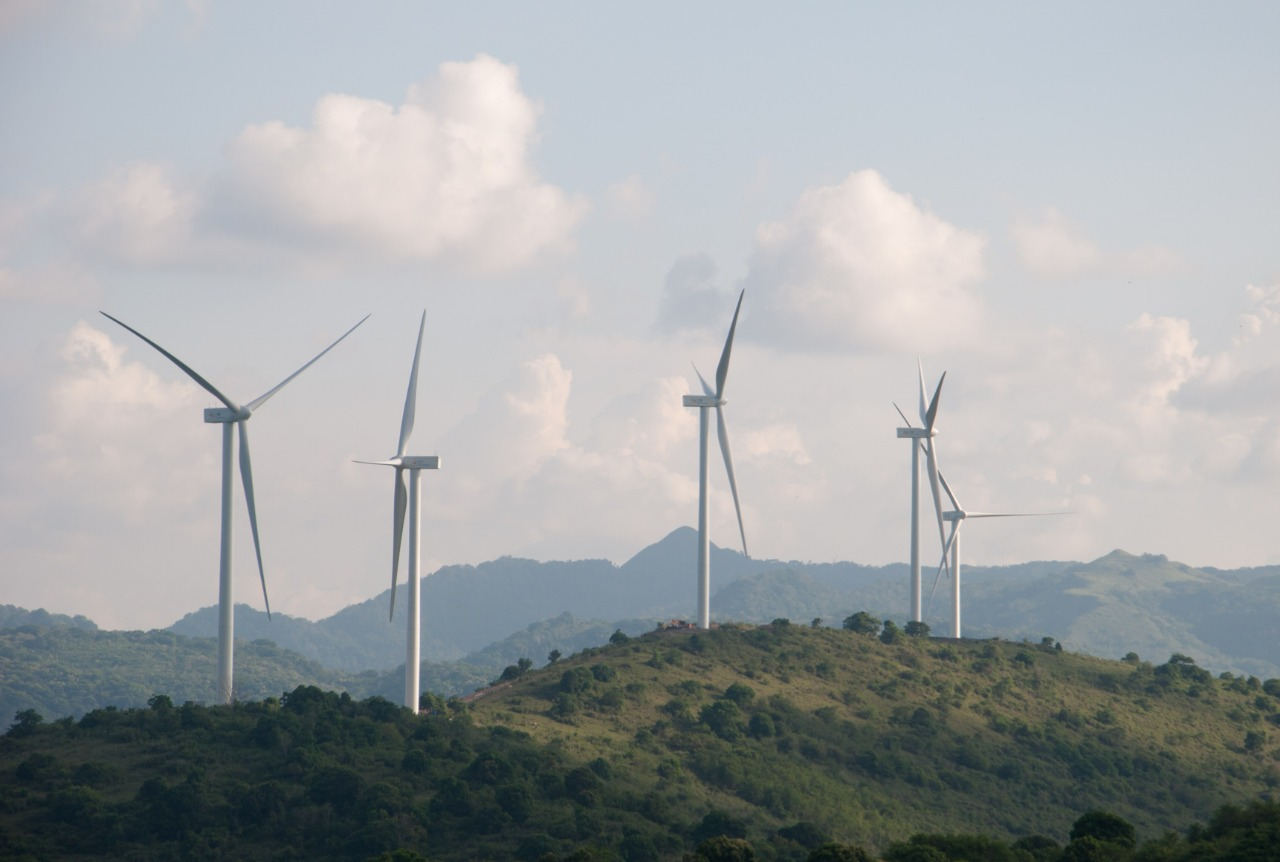
Sidrap wind farm, Indonesia's first wind power plant, in Sidrap Regency, South Sulawesi.

On average, low wind speeds mean that for many locations there is limited scope for large-scale energy generation from wind in Indonesia. Only small (<10 kW) and medium (<100 kW) generators are feasible. For Sumba Island in East Nusa Tengarra (NTT), according to NREL, three separate technical assessments have found that "Sumba's wind resources could be strong enough to be economically viable, with the highest estimated wind speeds ranging from 6.5 m/s to 8.2 m/s on an annual average basis." A very small amount of (off-grid) electricity is generated using wind power. For example, a small plant was established at Pandanmino, a small village on the south coast of Java in Bantul Regency, Yogyakarta Province, in 2011. However, it was established as an experimental plant and it is not clear whether funding for long-term maintenance will be available.

In 2018, Indonesia installed its first wind farm, the 75 MW Sidrap, in Sidenreng Rappang Regency, South Sulawesi, which is the biggest wind farm in Southeast Asia. In 2019, Indonesia installed another wind farm with a capacity of 72 MW, in Jeneponto Regency, South Sulawesi.

==== Solar power ====
The Indonesian solar PV sector is relatively underdeveloped but has significant potential, up to 207 GW with utilization in the country is less than 1%. However, a lack of consistent and supportive policies, the absence of attractive tariff and incentives, as well as concerns about on-grid readiness pose barriers to the rapid installation of solar power in Indonesia, including in rural areas.

As of early 2023, Indonesia has an installed capacity of 322 MW, and the country has a target of 5 GW by 2030.

The country's largest solar plant is the floating solar system at the Cirata Reservoir, with a capacity of 145 MW, inaugurated in November 2023.

==== Tidal Power ====
With over 17,000 islands, Indonesia has great potential for tidal power development. The Alas Strait, a 50 km stretch of ocean between Lombok and Sumbawa Island, alone could potentially yield 640 GWh of energy annually from tidal power. As of 2023, despite evidence of great potential, no Indonesian tidal power facilities have been developed.

== Use of energy ==
=== Transport sector ===
Much of the energy in Indonesia is used for domestic transportation. The dominance of private vehicles - mostly cars and motorbikes - in Indonesia has led to an enormous demand for fuel. Energy consumption in the transport sector is growing by about 4.5% every year. There is therefore an urgent need for policy reform and infrastructure investment to enhance the energy efficiency of transport, particularly in urban areas.

There are large opportunities to reduce both the energy consumption from the transport sector, for example through the adoption of higher energy efficiency standards for private cars/motorbikes and expanding mass transit networks. Many of these measures would be more cost-effective than the current transport systems. There is also scope to reduce the carbon intensity of transport energy, particularly through replacing diesel with biodiesel or through electrification. Both would require comprehensive supply chain analysis to ensure that the biofuels and power plants are not having wider environmental impacts such as deforestation or air pollution.

=== Electricity sector ===
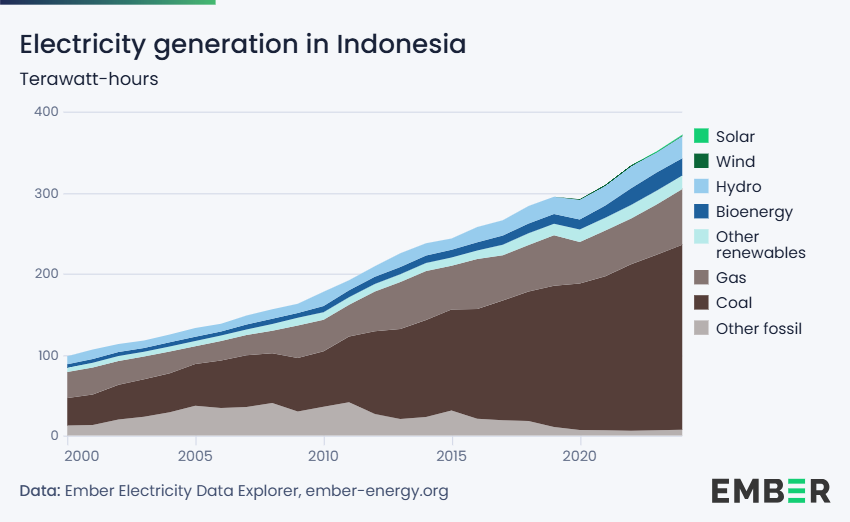
Electricity generation in Indonesia in terawatt-hours

The electricity sector in Indonesia, managed primarily by the state-owned enterprise Perusahaan Listrik Negara (PLN), faces significant challenges due to the country's archipelagic nature, which includes over 17,000 islands. By 2020, Indonesia had installed approximately 63.3 gigawatts (GW) of electrical generation capacity, producing around 275 terawatt-hours (TWh) annually, predominantly from fossil fuels such as coal, natural gas, and oil, alongside contributions from renewable sources like hydroelectric and geothermal power to align with the Paris Climate Agreement's goal of increasing renewable energy to at least 23% by 2025. Despite substantial progress in electrification, with rates increasing from 67% in 2010 to over 99% in 2020, the country still grapples with issues of reliability and service quality, mainly in remote and eastern regions where infrastructure challenges and logistical issues often result in frequent power outages and service disruptions.

Electricity generation by source 2011- 2021 (GWh)
Year	Coal	Oil	Natural gas	Hydro	Geothermal	Biofuels	Wind	Solar PV	Waste
2011	81,090	42,178	38,137	12,419	9,371	186	5	1	30
2012	102,166	29,919	45,453	12,799	9,417	238	5	3	30
2013	111,252	26,752	51,490	16,923	9,414	144		5	40
2014	119,532	26,152	56,025	15,162	10,038	924		7	36
2015	130,508	19,650	58,894	13,741	10,048	1,114	4	5	20
2016	135,358	15,704	65,699	18,677	10,656	1,793	6	21	6
2017	147,875	19,412	55,359	18,632	12,764	825	6	29	5
2018	160,020	14,879	59,421	21,636	14,018	13,512	190	89	1
2019	174,493	9,997	61,331	21,161	14,100	13,738	484	118	21
2020	180,868	7,906	48,051	24,325	15,563	14,448	475	170	17
2021	189,683	8,684	51,603	24,697	15,899	17,453	437	192	11

== Government policy ==
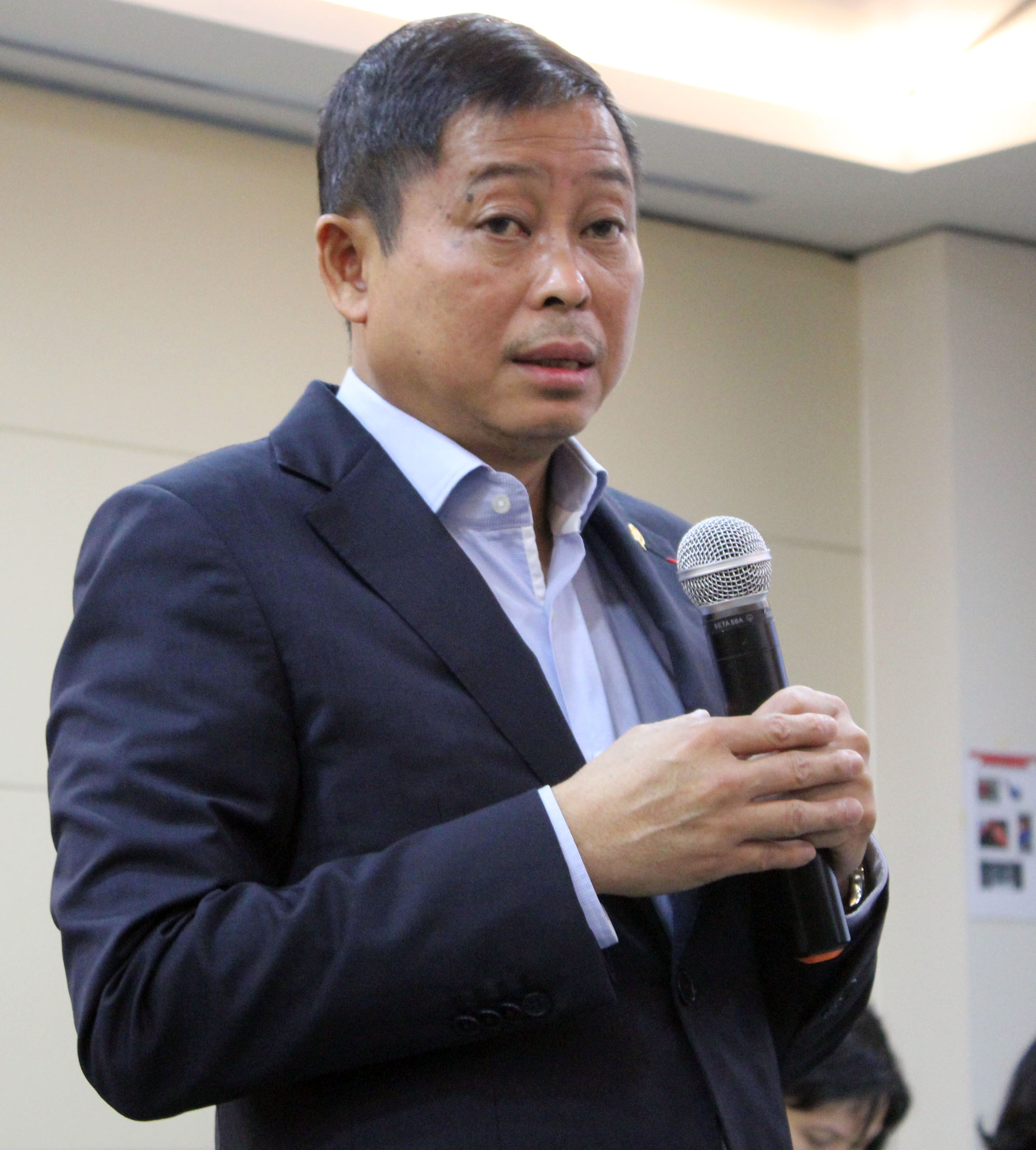
Ignasius Jonan, Indonesian Minister of Energy and Mineral Resources

=== Climate policies ===
Indonesia aims to achieve net zero emissions by 2060 or sooner as part of its development goal to become an advanced economy by 2045. Indonesia is often classified as a laggard in terms of climate policy.

=== Carbon tax ===
Carbon tax provisions are regulated in Article 13 of Law 7/2021 in which a carbon tax is to be imposed on entities producing carbon emissions that have a negative impact on the environment. Based on Law 7/2021, the imposition of the carbon tax is to be carried out by a combination of two schemes, a carbon tax (cap and tax) and carbon trade (cap and trade).

In the carbon trade scheme, individual or company ("entities") that produce emissions exceeding the cap are required to purchase emission permit certificates ("Sertifikat Izin Emisi"/SIE) from other entities that produce emissions below the cap.

In addition, entities can also purchase emission reduction certificates ("Sertifikat Penurunan Emisi"/SPE). However, if the entity is unable to purchase SIE or SPE in full for the resulting emissions, the cap and tax scheme will apply where entities producing residual emissions that exceed the cap will be subject to carbon tax.

Indonesia implemented a carbon tax in April 2022, initially targeting the power sector with intentions to expand to other sectors by 2025, based on readiness. This tax is part of a broader approach to decarbonization, regulated under the Law of the Harmonization of Tax Regulations. It complements a domestic emissions trading system (ETS) set to become mandatory by 2024. Non-compliant installations under the ETS will incur a carbon tax, linked to the domestic carbon market price.

== Renewable energy policies ==
=== Electricity generation ===
In Indonesia's electricity supply plan for 2021-2030 (RUPTL), the state electricity company, Perusahaan Listrik Negara (PLN), targets substantial growth in renewable energy, aiming for renewables to account for over half of the capacity additions. The plan includes 10 gigawatts (GW) of hydro and about 3 GW from geothermal, with smaller additions from wind (0.4 GW) and solar photovoltaic (PV) (4.7 GW). Coal is expected to make up one-third of additions (about 14 GW), with no new coal capacity planned post-2030. Natural gas will contribute about 14% to new additions.

=== Bioenergy ===
Indonesia's Ministry of Energy and Mineral Resources (MEMR) is advancing bioenergy utilization with initiatives like setting up waste-to-energy plants in 12 cities, implementing co-firing in coal generators, and increasing the use of liquid biofuels. The rise in palm oil production has led to a higher proportion of biofuel blending in diesel, supported by the National Energy Law of 2007, which established blending mandates and subsidy mechanisms. Since 2015, regulations have raised biodiesel's share in diesel consumption to 30% by January 2020, up from 20% in 2019. The goal for bioethanol blending is to reach 20% by 2025, starting from a 10% target in 2020. The government intends to further raise biodiesel blending to 40% (B40) and supports the construction of refineries to transform waste bioenergy into biofuels, including bio-based liquefied petroleum gas (LPG) and naphtha.

== Major energy companies in Indonesia ==
The logo of Pertamina

Indonesian firms

- Pertamina, the state-owned oil company
  - Pertamina Gas Negara, the state-owned gas company, subsidiary of Pertamina
- Perusahaan Listrik Negara, the state-owned electricity company.
- PT Bumi Resources owned by the Bakrie Group
- PT Medco Energi International, the largest publicly listed oil and gas company in Indonesia
- Adaro Energy, one of the largest coal mining companies in Indonesia

Foreign firms

- US-based firm PT Chevron Pacific Indonesia is the largest producer of crude oil in Indonesia; Chevron produces (2014) around 40% of the crude oil in Indonesia
- Total E&P Indonesia which operates the East Mahakam field in Kalimantan and other fields
- ExxonMobil is one of the main foreign operators in Indonesia
- Equinor, a Norwegian multinational firm, which has been operating in Indonesia since 2007, especially in Eastern Indonesia
- BP which is a major LNG operator in the Tangguh gas field in West Papua.
- ConocoPhillips which currently operates four production-sharing contracts including at Natuna and in Sumatra.
- Inpex, a Japanese firm established in 1966 as North Sumatra Offshore Petroleum Exploration Co. Ltd.

== Greenhouse gas emissions ==
Carbon dioxide emissions from energy, 2011-2023 (MtCO₂)
2011	2012	2013	2014	2015	2016	2017	2018	2019	2020	2021	2022	2023
470.6	489.5	460.6	469.0	489.0	487.8	514.6	565.6	613.2	560.8	572.5	704.4	701.4

The CO_{2} emissions of Indonesia were greater than those of Italy already in 2009. Indonesia's total greenhouse gas emissions including construction and deforestation in 2005 put Indonesia among the top four in the world after China, the US and Brazil. In 2022, Indonesia ranked 7th in the world in total fossil CO_{2} emissions, and 88th in per capita emissions. The carbon intensity of electricity generation, at over 600 gCO_{2}/kWh, is higher than those most other countries. Energy sector emissions in 2021 were around 600 million tonnes, making Indonesia the ninth-largest emitter globally.

== See also ==
- Nuclear power in Indonesia
- List of power stations in Indonesia
- Rural electrification
- List of main infrastructure projects in Indonesia
- List of renewable energy topics by country
- List of gas fields in Indonesia
