= List of gas fields in Indonesia =

List of gas fields in Indonesia.

- Abadi gas field
- Arun gas field
- Badak gas field
- East Natuna gas field
- Peciko gas field
- Tangguh gas field
- Tunu gas field
- Vorwata gas field

== See also ==
- Malaysia–Thailand joint development area
