= Malikussaleh University =

Higher education institution in Aceh Utara, Indonesia

- Universitas Malikussaleh
- Other names: Unimal
- Motto: The Blessing University
- Type: Public
- Established: 12 June 1969
- Accreditation: B
- Affiliations: Kemdikbudristek
- Rector: Prof. Dr. H.Herman Fithra, ST., MT., IPM., Asean.Eng.
- Location: North Aceh Regency, Aceh, Indonesia; 5°14′2.56″N 96°59′14.22″E
- Campus: Urban
- Colours: Green Gold
- Website: unimal.ac.id

Malikussaleh University (Indonesian: Universitas Malikussaleh, abbreviated UNIMAL) is an Indonesian public university in North Aceh Regency. Founded in 1969 as a religious academy, it branched into multiple subjects, integrated into the modern university in 1989. It was nationalized in 2001.

With seven faculties, it is one of the four public universities (Perguruan Tinggi Negeri) in the Aceh province.

== History ==
Unimal originated as a religious theological academy (Akademi Ilmu Agama) established in 1969 by the local government of North Aceh Regency. Following several name changes, it became the Malikussaleh University Foundation (Yayasan Universitas Malikussaleh) in 1980, named after the first Samudera Pasai ruler Malikussaleh. Its faculties were first formally registered in 1984. It was reintegrated in 1989 and nationalized in 2001.

The current rector, Apridar, has been active since 2010 and is serving his second term.

In 2017, the university's rectorate building was set on fire by a former employee.

== Students ==
The university had a freshman class of over 3,000 in 2017, with the third largest number of BIDIKMISI (Indonesian Government scholarships for low-income university students) recipients. They are separated into seven undergraduate faculties (Economics, Law, Social and Political Science, Medicine, Education, Agriculture and Engineering) and five master's programs.

The university was accredited "B" for the 2016-2021 period by the national accreditation body.
