= Port of Krueng Geukueh =

Seaport in Aceh, Indonesia

- Click on the map for a fullscreen view

Location
- Country: Indonesia
- Location: North Aceh, Aceh
- Coordinates: 5°14′30″N 97°2′19″E

Details
- Owned by: PT Pelabuhan Indonesia I

The Port of Krueng Geukueh, sometimes called the Port of Lhokseumawe, is a seaport in Aceh, Indonesia, located on the Strait of Malacca.

== History ==
The port, along with the nearby oil and gas terminal in Lhokseumawe proper, was not damaged by the 2004 Indian Ocean tsunami. This was unlike other ports in Aceh which were damaged and restricted operations, and hence shipment of cargo and aid through Aceh flowed through Krueng Geukeuh and the Port of Belawan. After the conclusion of the Aceh conflict, the port became a departure point of many Indonesian Army and Police personnel returning to their home regions. After the tsunami, a 268 meter long pier was constructed by Badan Rehabilitasi dan Rekonstruksi.

It was opened for general public cargo in 2009, but initially did not see much traffic outside of specialized cargo such as LNG and chemicals from the Arun Lhokseumawe Special Economic Zone which mostly utilized their own piers. Local cargo preferred to ship through Belawan, due to lower costs. The port was granted permission to be used as an entry point for imported goods in 2013. Palm oil began to be shipped from the port in 2019.

== Operations ==
In the first half of 2020, the port reported that it handled ~280,000 tonnes of cargo, mostly loose cargo such as palm oil and cement. Container operations, which began in late 2019, was reported at around 1,500 containers in the first half of 2020. The port used to serve passengers, but passenger operations were shuttered in mid-2021 due to a lack of interest.

Outside from the general cargo pier, there is also a special terminal for natural gas and a private terminal owned by fertilizer company Pupuk Iskandar Muda. The port is operated by Pelindo I. The port has a 3-hectare container yard.
