= Arun gas field =

Natural gas field in north Sumatra, Indonesia

Coordinates: 5°3′16″N 97°15′34″E

Arun
- Location within Indonesia
- Country: Indonesia
- Offshore/onshore: offshore
- Operators: Pertamina; ExxonMobil

Field history
- Discovery: 1971
- Start of production: 1975
- Abandonment: 2014

Production
- Estimated gas in place: 457×10^{9} m^{3} 16×10^{12} cu ft

The Arun gas field is a natural gas field located in the Aceh province on north Sumatra, Indonesia. It was discovered by Mobil Oil Corporation in 1971 and has been described as "the most lucrative LNG operation in the twentieth century." The field began production of natural gas and condensates in 1975.

Production of natural gas at the Arun field contributed to a serious environmental conflict in which the secessionist Free Aceh Movement (GAM) fought for control of the Aceh province and associated gas revenues. During the conflict, the Indonesian military committed hundreds of human rights abuses against Acehnese villagers.

The field closed due to lack of feed gas in 2014, and was converted into an LNG import terminal in 2015.

== Production and reserves ==
Mobil Oil Corporation found natural gas in the Arun field near Lhokseumawe, in the Aceh province of Indonesia in 1971. The Arun field is about 21,400 acres, located in the coastal plain between the Barisan Mountains and the Strait of Malacca. Gas reserves were estimated in 1983 at about 16 trillion cubic feet (457 billion m^{3}). The project was developed by Mobil and Pertamina.

The PT Arun gas liquefaction plant was built about 12 miles from the gas field, and initially had three production trains. Three additional trains were built in the early 1980s, bringing the total capacity of the plant to more than 10 million tons per annum. Construction of the plant was carried out by a Japanese and Indonesian joint venture, and the initial cost was about $940 million.

The Arun field and Badak NGL were the largest gas projects in Indonesia in the 1970s – 80s, and by the end of this period thirty percent of Indonesia's LNG exports came from Aceh. Indonesia was the world's largest exporter of LNG from then through about 2001. Japan purchased most of this supply. Production at Arun was around 450 million cubic feet/day (1.29 million m^{3}) in 1992. The field produced almost one fourth of Mobil corporation's global revenue in the early 1990s before that company's merge to become ExxonMobil in 1999.

By 2004, reservoir pressure and well productivity had declined. Gas production ended in 2015.

=== Geology ===
A 1983 geologic survey found condensate-rich gas in "reef and associated carbonate facies of Lower and Middle Miocene Age that in places exceed 1,000 ft (305 m) in thickness," In 2019, a multi-disciplinary study of 16 wells in the Arun field found that the Arun Carbonate Reservoir contained 92% limestone, 5% dolomite, and 3% dolomitic limestone or other composition. It is also divided in four primary facies: reef, near reef, inter-reef lagoon, and middle shelf; with the reef and lagoonal facie being productive.

The gas reservoir is at high temperature and pressure (177 degrees C; 351 F), and the field has potential for geothermal energy production. A 2022 model suggested that the Arun field had potential for additional production through Carbon capture and enhanced gas recovery.

== Environmental conflict ==
=== Background ===
From 1945-67, the administration of President Sukarno was not friendly to foreign investment, especially from Western nations. After the coup attempt of 1965 and subsequent mass-killings of Indonesian Communists, President Suharto's military dictatorship, advised by the Berkeley Mafia, offered much friendlier terms to foreign investors.

Several environmental justice campaigns materialised around extractivist projects in Indonesia during the Suharto dictatorship: oil fields in Riau province operated by Chevron-Texaco, gold mining in Sulawesi operated by Newmont, and a copper mine in West Papua operated by Freeport-McMoRan all resulted in campaigns for greater local autonomy from the Indonesian central government.

Discovery of gas reserves at the Arun field contributed to violence in Aceh beginning by at least 1976 when the Free Aceh Movement (GAM) began fighting to secede from Indonesia. Acehnese secessionists resented President Suharto's military dictatorship in Java partly because nearly all revenue from the Arun field was taken by the central government, and Aceh province did not receive development or other benefits. GAM claimed that, "Acheh, Sumatra has been producing a revenue of over 15 billion US dollars yearly for the Javanese neocolonialists, which they used totally for the benefit of Java and the Javanese." Acehnese residents were also subjected to environmental burdens of gas production, such as chemical leaks, relocation, and poisoned water that damaged fishing and agricultural resources.

=== Conflict ===
During the Suharto dictatorship, locals in Aceh increasingly associated Mobil with the oppressive Javanese government. These grievances contributed to the Aceh insurgency between GAM and the Indonesian military, in which Mobil assets were sometimes targeted. Two gas workers were killed in attacks in 1977.

==== Human rights abuses ====
The government imposed martial law in 1989, which was enforced mainly by Javanese troops who were perceived as foreigners in Aceh. The Indonesian Human Rights Commission reported brutal suppression by the military and hundreds of cases where locals were raped, tortured, and murdered.

Some local people hold ExxonMobil responsible for the human rights violations, because the soldiers were under contract with the oil company. Human rights groups say that Exxon's heavy equipment was used to dig mass graves. ExxonMobil does not deny that these atrocities occurred, but states that their managers were not aware of the events at the time and that their troops were "not used in offensive operations". Exxon also emphasized jobs and public services that it provided to the region.

In 2001, several villagers affected by this violence filed a lawsuit in the US against Exxon with Doe v. ExxonMobil Corp. Exxon repeatedly attempted to get the case dismissed and has stalled the litigation for over twenty years. In July 2022, a US District Court ruled that the case could go to trial.

The government lifted martial law in 1998, but violence forced ExxonMobil to stop production in 2001.

== See also ==
- List of gas fields in Indonesia
- Doe v. Exxon Mobil Corp.
- Arun Lhokseumawe Special Economic Zone
