= Seumadu Island =

Seumadu Island Pulau Seumadu
- Tourism
- Country: Indonesia
- Province: Aceh
- City: Lhokseumawe
- Website: https://bappeda.lhokseumawekota.go.id

Seumadu Island is located in Muara Satu, about 10 kilometers east of Lhokseumawe. This island is a tourist spot for the citizens of Lhokseumawe for whom it is easily accessible. The island is also commonly known as Rancong Beach.

== Location and Transportation ==
Seumadu Island is located in Muara Satu, Lhokseumawe. PT Arun, the largest oil company in the Aceh province, is located approximately 12 miles from downtown Lhokseumawe along the route to Banda Aceh from Medan.

== Name Origin ==
Seumadu Island was formerly named Rancong Beach. However it became more commonly referred to as Seumadu Island. The origin of this name change is based on a story of a husband and wife who lived in the region. The husband, Mr. Jali, was one of the first people to set up a food stall near the Rancong beach. Although others later followed his example, people began calling the beach "Seumadu", after the name of Mr. Jali's stall.

== Island Tourism ==
The island is well known for its natural beauty and as a result attracts many tourists.

The Lhokseumawe community and surrounding areas are frequent visitors looking to enjoy its beaches. Access to the island is via a simple foot-bridge built by one of the local residents. Before the foot bridge was built, the only way to cross was by boat.
