= Accusations of ExxonMobil human rights violations in Aceh =

Description of human rights violations accusations against ExxonMobil in Aceh

Human rights violations in Aceh, Indonesia occurred in the late 1990s and early 2000s when ExxonMobil hired Indonesian military units to guard their Arun gas field, and these military units raided and razed local villages. Government inquiries have extensively documented these abuses. Victims allege that ExxonMobil knew about the atrocities, which include assault, torture, and murder, and should be liable for them. The company denies these accusations; its primary defense is that the human rights violations which were occurring were not a result of specific intention of the organization and therefore it cannot be held liable.

In 2001, Eleven Indonesian villagers affected by this violence filed the lawsuit John Doe v. Exxon Mobil Corp. in the US. Exxon attempted to have the case dismissed nine times, dragging the lawsuit out for over 20 years. In July 2022, a US District Court denied ExxonMobil's motions to dismiss the case, clearing the way for the lawsuit to go to trial, although no trial date was set. In 2023, ExxonMobile settled the case a week before trial.

In 2015, ExxonMobil sold its Aceh operations to Pertamina.

== History of the Aceh gas fields ==
Aceh is located on the northern tip of the Indonesian island of Sumatra. The region is rich in natural resources, including oil and natural gas. In 1992, it was reported that Aceh provided 15% of Indonesia's total exports, and the value of the oil and gas fields was estimated in 2003 to generate US$1.2-1.5 billion annually.

In 1968, Mobil began operating the Arun gas fields, which are owned by the Indonesian state oil company, Pertamina. In 1971, Mobil Oil Indonesia discovered massive reserves of natural gas in north Aceh, which led to the creation of the Lhokseumawe Industrial Zone (LIZ). After Exxon bought Mobil in 1999, the merged company, which is based in Irving, Texas, took over the management of Arun. The gas fields there, until their closing in March, contributed to the Indonesian budget with about $1 billion in revenue annually. Aceh, the home for the natural gas field has been witnessing an armed resistance organized under the banner of the Free Aceh Movement. From 1989 to 1998, the Indonesian government designated Aceh as a Military Operation Area, with thousands of troops assigned to defeat the armed independence force.

Since the late 1980s, ExxonMobil Corporation, along with its predecessor companies, Mobil Oil Corporation and Mobil Oil Indonesia, hired Indonesian military units to provide security for the Arun gas field in Aceh, Indonesia.

Fearing for the lives of its employees after a series of attacks, ExxonMobil shut down its Arun natural gas operations in Aceh in March 2001.

== Litigation ==
The International Labor Rights Fund took on the cause of people claiming to be victims of abuse. In 2001, ILRF filed Doe v. Exxon Mobil Corp. under the Alien Tort Claims Act (ATCA) in the Federal District Court for the District of Columbia on behalf of 11 villagers from Aceh claiming to be victims of human rights abuses by security forces hired by ExxonMobil. The suit alleges that ExxonMobil employed military troops to protect its operations, and aided and abetted human rights violations through financial and other material support to the security forces. In addition, the suit alleges that the security forces are either employees or agents of Exxon Mobil, and thus Exxon Mobil is liable for their actions.

In 2005 a US federal judge ruled that the case could proceed on District of Columbia state law claims, including wrongful death, theft by coercion and assault and battery, but dismissed claims under the ATCA and the Torture Victim Protection Act. In 2006 a motion to dismiss filed by ExxonMobil was dismissed, as was an appeal in 2007. In 2008 the US Supreme court, having invited the US Solicitor General to comment, declined to hear an appeal. In 2009 the District Court accepted Exxon's motion to dismiss, based on lack of standing by the plaintiffs' in a US court; this was reversed in 2011 by the appeals court.

In 2014, a US federal court decided that the case could proceed; in 2015 that the claims sufficiently "touch and concern" the United States that they may proceed in US court.

In 2023, the parties settled the case a week before trial.
