= Muara Dua =

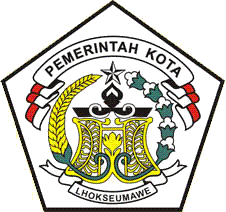
- Seal

- Location of the city in northern Sumatra
- Coordinates: 5°11′17″N 97°8′25″E
- Country: Indonesia
- Province: Aceh
- City: lhokseumawe
- District: Muara Dua
- City Established: June 21, 2001

Government
  - Camat: Umar, S.Sos

Area
  - Total: 57.80 km^{2} (22.32 sq mi)

Population (2012)
  - Total: 22,850
  - Density: 395.3/km^{2} (1,024/sq mi)
- Time zone: UTC+7 (WIB)
- Postal code: 24351
- Area code: +62645
- Website: http://www.bappedalhokseumawe.web.id

Muara Dua is a district in Lhokseumawe, Aceh, Indonesia.

== Administrative divisions ==
list the name of the village (Gampong) is in Districts of Muara Dua

- Gampong Alue Awe (postcode : 24352)
- Gampong Blang Crum (postcode : 24352)
- Gampong Blang Pohroh (postcode : 24352)
- Gampong Cot Girek Kandang (postcode : 24352)
- Gampong Cut Mamplam(postcode : 24352)
- Gampong Keude Cunda (postcode : 24352)
- Gampong Lhok Mon Puteh (postcode : 24352)
- Gampong Meunasah Alue (postcode : 24352)
- Gampong Meunasah Blang (postcode : 24352)
- Gampong Meunasah Manyang (postcode : 24352)
- Gampong Meunasah Mee (postcode : 24352)
- Gampong Meunasah Mesjid (postcode : 24352)
- Gampong Paloh Batee (postcode : 24352)
- Gampong Panggoi (postcode : 24352)
- Gampong Paya Bili (postcode : 24352)
- Gampong Paya Punteut (Punteuet) (postcode : 24352)
- Gampong Uteun Kot (postcode : 24352)
