= Banda Sakti =

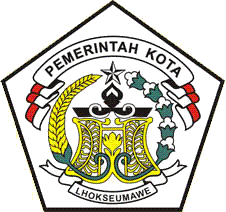
- Seal

- Location of the city in northern Sumatra
- Coordinates: 5°11′17″N 97°8′25″E
- Country: Indonesia
- Province: Aceh
- City: lhokseumawe
- District: Banda Sakti
- City Established: June 21, 2001

Government
  - Camat: Munadi, S.Sos

Area
  - Total: 11.24 km^{2} (4.34 sq mi)

Population (2012)
  - Total: 77,336
  - Density: 6,880/km^{2} (17,820/sq mi)
- Time zone: UTC+7 (WIB)
- Postal code: 24351
- Area code: +62645
- Website: http://www.bappedalhokseumawe.web.id

Banda Sakti is a district in Lhokseumawe, Aceh, Indonesia.

== Administrative divisions ==
list the name of the village (Gampong) is in Districts of Banda Sakti

- Gampong Tumpok Teungoh (postcode: 24311)
- Gampong Simpang Empat (postcode: 24313)
- Gampong Lhokseumawe (postcode: 24314)
- Gampong Pusong Baru (postcode: 24314)
- Gampong Kampung Jawa Baru (postcode: 24315)
- Gampong Banda Masem (postcode: 24351)
- Gampong Hagu Barat Laut (postcode: 24351)
- Gampong Hagu Selatan (postcode: 24351)
- Gampong Hagu Teungoh (postcode: 24351)
- Gampong Kampung Jawa Lama (postcode: 24351)
- Gampong Keude Aceh (postcode : 24351)
- Gampong Kuta Blang (postcode : 24351)
- Gampong Lancang Garam (postcode : 24351)
- Gampong Mon Geudong (postcode : 24351)
- Gampong Pusong Lama (postcode : 24351)
- Gampong Ujong Blang (postcode : 24351)
- Gampong Ulee Jalan (postcode : 24351)
- Gampong Uteun Bayi (postcode : 24351)
