= Ujong Blang Beach =

- Tourism
- Interactive map of Ujong Blang Beach
- Country: Indonesia
- Province: Aceh
- City: Lhokseumawe
- Website: https://bappeda.lhokseumawekota.go.id

Ujung Blang beach is a well-known beach in the city of Lhokseumawe. It is near the estuaries of the Cunda River, and stretches across four neighborhoods in Lhokseumawe: Ujung Blang village, Ulee Jalan village, Hagu Barat Laut village, and Hagu Tengah village.

Ujung Blang Beach is named after the village where the beach is located. Its name, meaning the end of farm fields, refers to Lhokseumawe's history of rice farming, marshes, and vacant land.
