= Reklamasi Pusong Beach =

- Tourism
- Country: Indonesia
- Province: Aceh
- City: Lhokseumawe
- Website: https://bappeda.lhokseumawekota.go.id

Reklamasi Pusong Beach is in the northern city of Aceh province, namely Lhokseumawe.

Pusong Island is a small island, surrounded by coral reefs and a landmass which includes poor soil. Expanses of coral, two times larger than the size of the island itself, is visible at low tide. There are about 8000 residents on the island, which has an area of no more than 6 acres.

Actually, the island is quite widely used, but due to the abrasion of sea water, and frequent dredging sand for sale, causing Pusong island beach and also this is not an area of the size used, while still natural. The beach is located on the island of Pusong this is called Reklamasi Pusong Beach.
