= Doe v. Exxon Mobil Corp. =

Human rights lawsuit

John Doe VII v. Exxon Mobil Corp. (09–7125) is a lawsuit filed in the United States by 11 Indonesian villagers against ExxonMobil Corporation alleging that the company is responsible for human rights violations in the oil-rich province of Aceh, Indonesia. The case has broad implications for multinational corporations doing business in other countries. Indonesian security forces committed torture, rape, and murder against the plaintiffs and their families while under contract with ExxonMobil to guard the Arun gas field during the late 1990s and early 2000s; plaintiffs claim that Exxon is responsible for these atrocities.

ExxonMobil has tried to have the case dismissed nine times and dragged out litigation for over 20 years. In November 2021 plaintiffs' legal team filed a motion to set a trial date, and in July 2022, US District Judge Royce Lamberth denied ExxonMobil's motions to dismiss the case, clearing the way for the lawsuit to go to trial, although no trial date was set.

On May 15, 2023, the plaintiffs reached a confidential settlement with ExxonMobil, a week before the scheduled jury trial.

== Allegations ==
The eleven plaintiffs, contended in their lawsuit that family members were "beaten, burned, shocked with cattle prods, kicked, and subjected to other forms of brutality and cruelty" amounting to torture in Indonesia's Aceh province between 1999 and 2001, during a period of civil unrest. Exxon Mobil retained soldiers from Indonesia's military as guards for a natural gas facility at the Arun gas field in Aceh, despite knowing of past human rights abuses by the Indonesian army, leading to human rights violations against Aceh villagers. Plaintiffs sued in the United States District Court for the District of Columbia.

== Attempts to dismiss ==
Between 2001 and 2021, Exxon attempted to get the case dismissed nine times.

In July 2002, the Legal Adviser of the Department of State, William Howard Taft IV, sent a letter to the district court and later filed a statement of interest warning that allowing the lawsuit to proceed "would harm relations with Indonesia". In October 2005, District Judge Louis F. Oberdorfer dismissed the plaintiffs' claims under the Alien Tort Statute (ATS) and the Torture Victim Protection Act, finding they were political questions and so lacked justiciability. The common law tort claims, however, were allowed to proceed.

=== 2007 federal appeals ruling ===
In January 2007, the divided United States Court of Appeals for the District of Columbia Circuit affirmed the lower court's ruling that the case should proceed. Judge David B. Sentelle, joined by Senior Judge Harry T. Edwards held that Exxon's attempt to seek an interlocutory appeal was not justified this early into the litigation. Judge Brett Kavanaugh dissented, arguing that the appeal should instead be treated as a petition for mandamus, and that federal courts should dismiss lawsuits as nonjudiciable whenever the Executive Branch has reasonably claimed the litigation would harm U.S. foreign policy interests.

ExxonMobil appealed the 2007 decision in the US Supreme Court, and that court declined to hear the case in 2008.

=== 2009 district court dismissal and appeals ===
In September 2009, District Judge Royce Lamberth found that the remaining plaintiffs had no standing to sue and dismissed the case.

In July 2011, the divided Court of Appeals reversed the 2009 dismissal. A 2-1 panel of judges stated that US corporations in foreign countries could be "held liable for the torts committed by their agents" under the ATS. In this ruling, Judge Judith W. Rogers, joined by Judge David S. Tatel, explicitly rejected the contrary conclusion reached by the US Court of Appeals for the Second Circuit in Kiobel v. Royal Dutch Petroleum Co. Judge Kavanaugh dissented in part, arguing that the Second Circuit had reached the correct conclusion in Kiobel.

Exxon asked the Appellate Court to reconsider the case en banc in 2011, and in 2014 the court ruled that the case should proceed to trial. In July 2015, District Judge Lamberth also found that the case could proceed. That year, Rex Tillerson sold off Exxon Mobil's interest in the Aceh oilfields to the Indonesian government.

=== 2019 dismissal and 2021 proceeding to trial ===
In June 2019, the District Court dismissed the case, holding that under the Supreme Court's jurisprudence regarding the Alien Tort Statute, Exxon Corp. could not be held liable.

In November 2021 plaintiff's legal team filed a motion to set a trial date, and in July 2022, US District Judge Royce Lamberth denied ExxonMobil's motions to dismiss the case, clearing the way for the lawsuit to go to trial, although no trial date was set.
