= Malikussaleh =

13th-century Indonesian ruler

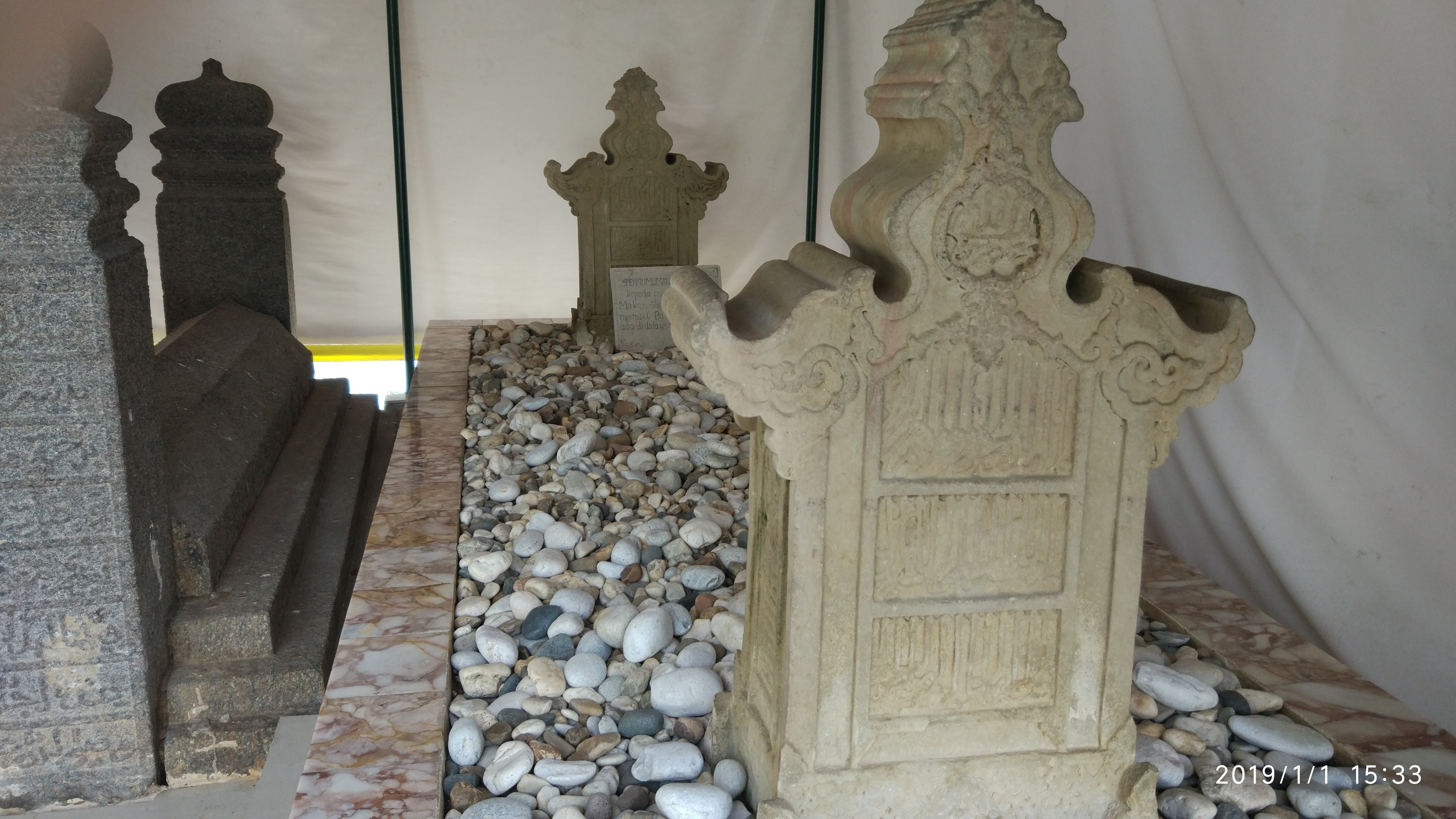
The tomb of Malikussaleh in Beuringen village, Samudra District, North Aceh

Sultan Malikussaleh (Arabic: الملك الصالح, ALA-LC: Sultan al-Malik al-Ṣāliḥ; Acehnese: Malik ul Saleh, Malikus Saleh; literal meaning: "the pious king" / "the pious ruler") was an Acehnese who established the first Muslim state of Samudera Pasai in the year 1267. His original name was Mara Silu, Merah Silu, or Meurah Silu. It was said he saw an ant as big as a cat, he caught it and ate it. He named the place Samudera, meaning ocean in Sanskrit (samudra). King Mara Silu later converted to Islam, given an Ayyubid name of al-Malik al-Ṣālih. He married neighbour Perlak (Peureulak) Kingdom's daughter and had two sons. According to Hikayat Raja-raja Pasai, he met the Islamic prophet Muhammad in dream thus accepts conversion of Islam. Another source claimed a prince Malik from Aceh sailed across the sea to Beruas (Gangga Negara) and established a sultanate there.

== Islam's arrival ==
According to Islamic Council of Victoria, historians argue "that by the beginning of the 9th century Arab merchants and sailors, (and other Muslims) had begun to dominate Nanhai (Guangzhou) or Southeast Asian Trade." However, Malik's tomb is the oldest evidence known of the establishment in Southeast Asia, indicating his death in 1297.

== See also ==
- Parameswara (sultan)
- Gangga Negara
