= Nisam Antara =

Nisam Antara is an administrative district (kecamatan) in North Aceh Regency, in Aceh Province of Indonesia.

== History ==
Nisam Antara District was established in 2007, having split off from the southern part of Nisam District.

== Administrative villages ==
Nisam Antara contains six villages (gampong), namely:

- Alue Dua
- Alue Papeun
- Seumirah
- Blang Jrat
- Blang Pohroh
- Darussalam
