= Bappeda kota lhokseumawe =

Badan Perencanaan Pembangunan Daerah Kota Lhokseumawe
- Bappeda Kota Lhokseumawe
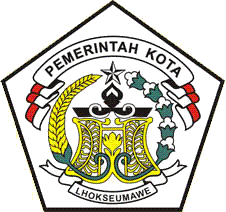
- Logo of Lhokseumawe City

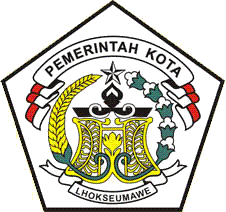
- Logo of Bappeda Lhokseumawe

Agency overview
- Formed: June 21, 2001; 25 years ago
- Jurisdiction: Lhokseumawe
- Headquarters: Lhokseumawe, Indonesia; 5°10′21.39″N 97°08′18.69″E
- Motto: "The realization of sustainable, participatory, transparent and trustful planning, control and evaluation of regional development supported by a robust Planning and Human Resource System"
- Employees: 96
- Annual budget: Rp. 10 billion
- Agency executives: Salahuddin, S. ST, M.S.M, Head Of Board; Ridwan, SH, Secretary; Zakaria, SKM., M.Kes, Head of Economic Development Planning & Empowerment; Tuti Indriani, S.T, MM, Head of Facilities & Infrastructure Development Planning Division; Ir. Fakhrizal, Head of Special Aceh Development Planning & HR; Nurkhalis, S.Sos, Head of Research and Development; M. Ridhwan, SE, M.Si, Head of Program and Development Funding
- Parent agency: Bappenas
- Website: bappeda.lhokseumawekota.go.id

Bappeda Lhokseumawe is the Indonesian abbreviation of Badan Perencanaan Pembangunan Daerah Kota Lhokseumawe. It is a Regional Development Planning Board, namely regional technical institutions in the field of regional development research and planning led by the Head of the Agency under and responsible to the Mayor of Lhokseumawe City.

Bappeda Lhokseumawe has the duty to carry out government affairs and development in the field of Economic and Employment; infrastructure development planning; development planning of Aceh and human resources features; research and development; program and development funding; technical implementation unit, and fostering Functional Position Groups in accordance with Legislation.

== History ==
Bappeda Lhokseumawe formed after Lhokseumawe City became the official local government.

== Function ==
Duties and functions of Bappeda Kota Lhokseumawe:

- a. Technical policy formulation;
- b. Technical development;
- c. Implementation guidelines;
- d. Formulation and assessment of policy concepts;
- d.1 Prepare archetypal regional development consisting of Work Plan (RKPD) and Long-Term Regional Development Plan (RPJPD);
- e. Tasks related to development, documentation and result dissemination;
- f. Long, medium and short term local development plans;
- g. Five year Regional Development Program;
- h. Annual development program for deconcentration program and community aspirations dosentralisasi that mejaring (stakeholder);
- i. Coordinate across agencies, regional institutions and other entities;
- j. Develop planning budget with DPKAD administrative coordination by SEKDA;
- k. Research, assessment and development of regional development planning system;
- l. Coordinate implementation of local development planning and evaluation;
- m. Coordinate and synchronize City development in accordance with regional development plans;
- n. Assess success of implementation activities and progress;
- o. Planning activities in accord with the policy framework of regional development;
- p. Development activities, and development and administrative personnel; and
- q. Other official duties in accord with the basic tasks and functions

== Organization Structure ==
The work units of Bappeda Kota Lhokseumawe consist of:

- Head
- Secretariat
- Field of Economic Development Planning and Employment
- Field of Infrastructure Development Planning
- Development Planning of Aceh and Human Resources Privileges
- Field of Research and Development
- Program and Development Funding
- UPTB
- Functional Position Group.
