= Sawang, North Aceh Regency =

Sawang is a subdistrict located in North Aceh Regency, Aceh Province, Indonesia.

The capital of the Sawang subdistrict is located in the eponymous village of Sawang. The population of Sawang subdistrict based on the 2017 Population Census is around 38,396 inhabitants and the area of the sub-district is approximately 384.65 km^{2}.

== Geography ==
Sawang is bordered to the east by the Subdistrict of Nisam Antara and Subdistrict of Banda Baro, to the west by Bener Meriah Regency, to the south by Bireuen and Bener Meriah Regency, and to the north by the Subdistrict of Muara Batu.

== Administration ==
Administration and governance in Sawang Subdistrict, North Aceh Regency is held by a Camat. The following is a list of Camat's who have led subdistrict Sawang, North Aceh Regency.

== Villages in Sawang ==
Sawang Subdistrict divided into 2 settlements or Mukim, namely South Sawang and North Sawang Settlements (Kemukiman)
