= Cot Girek =

District in Aceh, Indonesia

Cot Girek is a district in North Aceh Regency, Aceh, Indonesia. It is a home to diverse family of plants and world's some of the unique wild life, including Javan tigers, Javan leopards, Sumatran elephants, etc. Farmers and villagers are increasingly facing encroachment by elephants who comes to the villages to find food. Due to palm oil plantation, these elephant are facing food shortages and destruction of their habitat.

Cot Girek has several villages, namely:

- Alue Drien
- Alue Leuhob
- Alue Seumambu
- Ara LSK Selatan
- Beurandang Asan
- Beurandang Dayah
- Beurandang Krueng
- Ceumpeudak
- Cot Girek
- Drien Dua
- Gampong Batu XII
- Gampong Trieng
- Jeulikat
- Kampung Bantan
- Kampung Tempel
- Lhok Merbo
- Lhok Reuhat
- Lueng Baro
- Matang Teungoh LS
- Meunasah U Baro
- Pucok Alue
- Seuneubok Baro
- Seupieng
- Trieng LSK Selatan
- Ulee Gampong
