= Arun Lhokseumawe Special Economic Zone =

Arun Lhokseumawe SEZ (Kawasan Ekonomi Khusus (KEK) Arun Lhokseumawe )
- Special Economic Zone
- Location in Indonesia Arun Lhokseumawe SEZ (Indonesia)
- Coordinates: 5.187450°N 97.138230°E
- Country: Indonesia
- Region: Aceh
- Province: Aceh
- Regency: North Aceh
- Founded: 2006

Area
  - Total: 26.22 km^{2} (10.12 sq mi)
- Time zone: UTC+7 (WIB)
- Website: https://www.sezarun.co.id/

Arun Lhokseumawe Special Economic Zone (Indonesian: Kawasan Ekonomi Khusus Arun Lhokseumawe) or abbreviated as Arun Lhokseumawe KEK, is a Special Economic Zone (SEZ) located in Lhokseumawe city and North Aceh Regency, Aceh, Indonesia. This SEZ was established through Government Regulation No. 5 / 2017.

Arun Lhokseumawe SEZ is spread over 2,622.48 hectares, including 1,840.8ha in Arun Natural Gas Liquefaction Area in Lhokseumawe, 582 hectares in Dewantara, and 199.6 hectares in Jamuan of North Aceh Regency. The development of SEZ Arun Lhokseumawe is focused on energy, petrochemical, agro industry supporting food security, logistics and kraft paper producing industries. The SEZ consists of an Export Processing Zone, a logistics zone, an industrial zone, an energy zone and a tourism zone. According to Benchmarkia, the SEZ is ranked among the top 25 industrial parks based on total investment.

== Access ==
SEZ Arun Lhokseumawe is located in the world’s busiest international shipping routes next to the Strait of Malacca, and approximately 260 KM from the capital Banda Aceh, and can be reached by land and air transport. Malikus Saleh Airport is about 18 kilometer from SEZ Arun Lhokseumawe, and from the international port of Ocean Pasee +/- 9 KM.
