= Muara Satu =

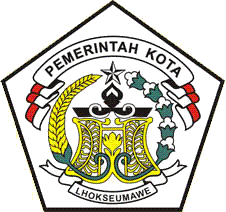
- Seal

- Location of the city in northern Sumatra
- Coordinates: 5°11′17″N 97°8′25″E
- Country: Indonesia
- Province: Aceh
- City: lhokseumawe
- District: Muara Satu
- City Established: June 21, 2001

Government
  - Camat: Rudi Hidayat, S.STP, MA

Area
  - Total: 55.90 km^{2} (21.58 sq mi)

Population (2012)
  - Total: 16,437
  - Density: 294.0/km^{2} (761.6/sq mi)
- Time zone: UTC+7 (WIB)
- Postal code: 24353
- Area code: +62645
- Website: http://www.bappedalhokseumawe.web.id

Muara Satu is a district in Lhokseumawe, Aceh, Indonesia.

== Administrative divisions ==
list the name of the village (Gampong) is in Districts of Muara Satu

- Gampong BatuPhat Barat (postcode : 24352)
- Gampong BatuPhat Timur (postcode : 24352)
- Gampong Blang Naleung Mameh (postcode : 24352)
- Gampong Blang Panyang (postcode : 24352)
- Gampong Blang Pulo (postcode : 24352)
- Gampong Cot Trieng (postcode : 24352)
- Gampong Meunasah Dayah (postcode : 24352)
- Gampong Meuria Paloh (postcode : 24352)
- Gampong Padang Sakti (postcode : 24352)
- Gampong Paloh Punti (postcode : 24352)
- Gampong Ujong Pacu (postcode : 24352)
