= Tangguh gas field =

Natural gas field in West Papua, Indonesia

- Location within Indonesia
- Country: Indonesia
- Region: West Papua
- Location: Bintuni Bay
- Offshore/onshore: Offshore
- Coordinates: 2°26′14″S 133°8′10″E
- Operator: bp
- Partners: bp (40.22%); MI Berau B.V. (16.3%); CNOOC Muturi Ltd. (13.9%); Nippon Oil Exploration (Berau) Ltd. (12.23%); KG Berau Petroleum Ltd. (8.56%); KG Wiriagar Petroleum Ltd. (1.44%); Indonesia Natural Gas Resources Muturi Inc. (7.35%)

Field history
- Discovery: 1994
- Start of production: 2009

Production
- Producing formations: Jurassic

The Tangguh gas field is a gas field lies in Berau Gulf and Bintuni Bay, in the province of West Papua, Indonesia. The natural gas field contains over 500 billion cubic metres (18 trillion cubic feet) of proven natural gas reserves, with estimates of potential reserves reaching over 800 billion cubic metres (28 trillion cubic feet).

The Tangguh field is operated by BP Berau Ltd. on behalf of other production sharing contract partners as contractor to SKK Migas. BP Berau Ltd and affiliates in Indonesia holds a 40.22% interest in the project. Other partners are MI Berau B.V. (16.30%), CNOOC Muturi Limited(13.90%), Nippon Oil Exploration (Berau), Limited (12.23%), KG Berau Petroleum Ltd and KG WiriagarPetroleum Ltd (10.00%), and Indonesia Natural Gas Resources Muturi Inc. (7.35%).

Production began in June 2009.

BP’s Tangguh UCC project includes carbon capture, with captured carbon dioxide intended for enhanced gas recovery at the field.

Natural gas extracted from the field will be liquefied and the resulting LNG transported to customers in Asia and Indonesia.

== Background ==
Indonesia has substantial oil and natural gas reserves, with discovered reserves estimated at more than 23 billion barrels (3.7 billion cubic meters) of oil and 150 trillion cubic feet (4.2 trillion cubic meters) of natural gas. Most of these reserves are associated with Tertiary source rocks and occur in Tertiary reservoirs on or near the coasts of Java, Sumatra, and Kalimantan.

Though these western areas have been the main focus of the country's petroleum activities, explorers have searched for giant accumulations in eastern Indonesia for more than a century.

In Papua (formerly Irian Jaya), Trend Exploration discovered about 350 million barrels (56 million cubic metres) of Miocene-sourced oil in Tertiary reefs in the Salawati Basin during the 1970s. Phillips, Conoco, Total and Occidental subsequently tried to emulate Trend's success by exploring the adjacent Bintuni Basin, but found only about 3 million barrels (480 thousand cubic metres), shallow onshore oil field called Wiriagar in 1981 and some uneconomic offshore gas in the early 1990s.

Arco entered Irian Jaya in 1989 by farming into a Conoco-led partnership holding an onshore block called KBSA on the northern side of Berau Bay. Gene Richards, Arco Indonesia's exploration vice president, executed the original farm-in as an opportunity to explore for large reserves in a frontier area where Pertamina had recently instituted improved fiscal terms.

Two dry holes were drilled in 1990, and Arco faced a decision -- to drop out of the Production Sharing Contract (PSC) and exit Irian Jaya, or to continue exploration in the Bintuni Basin.

== Looking deeper ==
The Tangguh LNG project in Eastern Indonesia began with the Wiriagar Deep-1 gas discovery, drilled by Arco’s New Venture team led by Suherman Tisnawidjaja as Arco Indonesia New Venture exploration manager. Suherman replaced Dick Garrard as a New Venture Manager in late 1991. Suherman’s main job in New Venture at that time was to evaluate and acquire new exploration blocks in Eastern Indonesia.

The Wiriagar area was one of the first targets of the New Venture team for an in depth exploration evaluation. This area is located in the southeastern part of the KBSA (Kepala Burung Selatan Block “A”) block. Arco was one of the partner in the KBSA PSC operated by Conoco. Larry Casarta and Sonny Sampurno were the geologists in the New Venture team that evaluated the block.

The Wiriagar Pre-Tertiary play was initially proposed by Larry Casarta based on the structural interpretation of the Pre-Tertiary level below the existing Wiriagar oil field. At that time the Wiriagar oil field had been producing oil from the Middle Miocene Kais limestone. The evaluation of the Wiriagar area was integrated with the regional study of the KBSA and Berau-Bintuni Bay areas of Pre-Tertiary sediment, especially the Middle Jurassic Roabiba sandstone which previously done by Larry Casarta and Sonny Sampurno. One of the key results of the petroleum system analyses indicated that Wiriagar oil was generated from Pre-Tertiary source rock. The kitchen is in the deep basin area, southeastern part of the Bintuni basin.

In 1992 John Duncan replaced Gene Richards as the Vice President of Arco Indonesia Exploration in Jakarta. John suggested the New Venture team to present the Wiriagar PSC proposal to Marlan Downey, President of Arco International, and his staff of Arco International’s Exploration management headquartered in Plano, Texas, seeking for their approval to enter the block. After a long and thorough discussion, Marlan finally agreed that the team should proceed with a direct negotiation with Pertamina, the Indonesian Oil and Gas State Company for a new Wiriagar PSC, after Conoco relinquished their KBSA block.

Suherman and his New Venture team approached Pertamina and presented a technical review to Pertamina's high level management; Zuhdi Pane Pertamina's exploration executive staff, Alex Frederik Pertamina's Head Negotiator, and other Pertamina's senior staffs. The main purpose of the presentation was to provide an explanation to Pertamina on Arco’s interest in acquiring a new Wiriagar PSC within the ex-Conoco's KBSA block. The team showed the proposed location of the Wiriagar PSC as well as the main target of the deeper Jurassic sandstone reservoir. Arco Indonesia executive management, Roger Machmud, president of Arco Indonesia, played a significant role during the intense negotiations with Pertamina.

Finally, in February 1993 the onshore Wiriagar PSC was officially awarded to Arco by the Government of Indonesia. In August 1994 the first well, Wiriagar Deep-1 (WD-1) was drilled and tested a cumulative gas flow of 850 thousand cubic metres (30 million cubic feet) per day at standard conditions from the very thick Paleocene turbidite sandstones and thin Middle Jurassic sandstone.

Stephen Scott, a staff geophysicist who joined the New Venture team in late 1994 provided seismic interpretations both for the onshore Wiriagar and the offshore Bintuni Bay, which were used to finalize the appraisal well location and to refine the regional understanding of the area. The pressure analyses of the WD-1 well, conducted by Larry Casarta and John Marcou, Petroleum Engineer in the team, indicated that the gas accumulation in Wiriagar Deep extends southward to the offshore Occidental's Berau Block. Arco International management approached Occidental and negotiated to farm-in into the Berau PSC. In 1995 Arco, joined later by Kanematsu (KG), farmed-in into the Berau PSC for a combined 60% working interest, and assumed operatorship of the block.

In late 1995 Arco drilled the first well in the offshore Berau PSC, Wiriagar Deep-2 (WD-2) as a confirmation well. The well was very successful, encountered much thicker Middle Jurassic sandstone than in WD-1 and it tested gas in the sandstone interval. The success of WD-1 and WD-2 wells were followed by several delineation wells.

The exploration activities in the area confirmed the presence of another NW-SE anticlinal structure in the Berau PSC to the east of Wiriagar Deep structure. In late 1996, the first well, Vorwata-1, was drilled in this structure and tested 31 MMSCF/D from Middle Jurassic Roabiba sandstone reservoir.

The New Venture team under the leadership of Suherman as the New Venture manager and John Duncan as Arco Indonesia Exploration Vice President prepared and executed the Wiriagar Deep and initial Vorwata appraisal program. The Wiriagar Deep and Vorwata fields were the main fields that constituted the Tanggguh gas project, with Vorwata field initially providing the gas that fed the Tangguh LNG plant in 2009.

In early 1998 the New Ventures team handed over the Tangguh project to the certification team who continued the Vorwata field appraisal program. The New Venture team continued to work studying the regional geology and evaluating block opportunities in the focus areas of Eastern Indonesia and NW Australian Shelf.

== Overcoming obstacles ==
Arco approached the rest of the KBSA partnership in late 1991 with a recommendation to jointly drill a deep test (Wiriagar Deep No. 1) on the Wiriagar structure.

The partners, who had already spent $145 million on the block, declined the proposal. Arco was unwilling to carry the other partners in a deep test despite the attraction of retaining KBSA's sunk cost pool, and no deal was reached among the group.

Arco's commercial manager in Jakarta, Thorkild Juul-Dam, then developed an economic case for a new PSC, aided by drilling manager Brett Crawford's analysis that the deep well could be drilled for much less than operator Conoco's cost estimate. The KBSA PSC expired, and Arco began discussions with Pertamina for a new PSC.

Crucial to these discussions were Roger Machmud, president of Arco Indonesia, and Larry Asbury, operations corporate vice president. Machmud and Asbury entered into serious negotiations with Pertamina in June 1992.

A new onshore Wiriagar PSC covering the deep structure and incorporating newly revised frontier incentives was signed in February 1993. Kanematsu joined Arco as a partner in the block. With help from Richard Leturno of drilling operations, petrophysicist Tony Lawrence and reservoir engineer John Marcou, Wiriagar Deep No. 1 was successfully drilled, logged and tested at 30 million cubic feet per day (850 thousand cubic metres per day) in August 1994.

The well was initially disappointing, as it was not an oil discovery.

However, a thoughtful analysis of pressure data by Larry Casarta and John Marcou indicated that the gas zones were significantly overpressured, and that a gas column height in excess of 2,000 feet was a reasonable interpretation of the data.

In other words, the discovery could be large enough to anchor an LNG project even if there was no downdip oil leg below the gas.

Tom Velleca, Arco corporate vice president of exploration, encouraged by chief geologist David Nicklin and chief geophysicist Barry Davis, decided to move ahead with appraisal of the Wiriagar Deep discovery -- but there was a commercial obstacle. If Casarta and Marcou were right about the size of the accumulation, much of the field lay to the south on the offshore Berau PSC held by an Occidental-led partnership.

Brad Sinex at Arco International's headquarters in Plano, Texas, took charge of the negotiations with Occidental and worked a farm-in to the Berau Block aided by Thorkild Juul-Dam in Jakarta. Oxy had already spent $64 million on the Berau PSC and had an additional $8 million work obligation.

Sinex was able to secure a 60 percent working interest for the Arco/Kanematsu group and operatorship for Arco in February 1995 in return for funding the drilling of a well. Offshore appraisal subsequently demonstrated that the Wiriagar anticline was indeed a large gas-bearing structure.

Geophysicist Stephen Scott joined the exploration team in December 1994. In addition to producing the maps on which the Wiriagar Deep appraisal locations were selected, Scott worked with Casarta and Sampurno to refine the regional geological picture. Previous Total, Occidental and Arco maps had contoured some small closures to the east of Wiriagar.

Scott put all the regional data together, and conceived that the closures could be part of one large anticline parallel to and immediately east of the Wiriagar fold. The new closure was named Vorwata.

Vorwata had a potential technical problem: At Jurassic level, it was several thousand feet deeper than the Wiriagar anticline, and generally accepted wisdom was that porosity would be low and reservoir quality poor.

John Duncan became exploration VP of Arco Indonesia in 1992, and in addition to managing the Indonesian exploration program was also a technical expert on burial history analysis. Recognizing that there might be a more optimistic scenario for Vorwata Jurassic reservoir quality, Duncan consulted with Alton Brown of Arco's geoscience technology group in Plano.

Brown analyzed burial history, facies controls and diagenesis, and concluded that conventional wisdom was wrong and reservoir quality would be fine.

That analysis gave Arco the confidence to push Vorwata as a viable drilling target to expedite certification of gas reserves. Vorwata No. 1 was drilled in late 1996, Brown's porosity prediction was exactly correct, and the well tested at 31 million cu ft/d (880 thousand m^{3}/d) in January 1997.

Subsequent appraisal confirmed that Vorwata was a significant gas accumulation. The Wiriagar Deep/Vorwata complex, together with satellite gas accumulations, has now been named Tangguh by the Republic of Indonesia.

After 25 wells, 500 pressure measurements, more than a mile of cores and a 3-D seismic survey, DeGolyer & MacNaughton in mid-1998 estimated Tangguh to contain at least 24 TCF of reserves.

If it wasn't for a small group of determined individuals the Tangguh LNG Project may never been.

== See also ==
- Energy in Indonesia
