= Peciko gas field =

Natural gas field in Indonesia

Peciko
- Country: Indonesia
- Region: Riau Islands; South China Sea
- Offshore/onshore: offshore
- Operator: Pertamina

Field history
- Discovery: 1977
- Start of production: 1999

Production
- Estimated gas in place: 150×10^{9} m^{3} 6.2×10^{12} cu ft

The Peciko gas field is a natural gas field located in the South China Sea. It was discovered in 1977 and developed by Total E&P Indonesie. It began production in 1999 and produces natural gas and condensates. The total proven reserves of the Peciko gas field are around 6.2 trillion cubic feet (150 billion m^{3}), and production is slated to be around 60 million cubic feet/day (168,000 m^{3}).
