= Malikus Saleh Airport =

Airport in Lhokseumawe, Sumatra, Indonesia

Malikus Saleh Airport Bandar Udara Malikus Saleh
- IATA: LSW; ICAO: WITM

Summary
- Airport type: Public
- Owner: Government of Lhokseumawe
- Operator: Ministry of Transportation
- Serves: Lhokseumawe
- Location: North Aceh Regency, Aceh, Indonesia
- Opened: 1985; 41 years ago
- Time zone: WIB (UTC+07:00)
- Elevation AMSL: 27 m / 90 ft
- Coordinates: 5°13′36″N 96°57′1″E

Map
- Location in Aceh Location in Northern Sumatra Location in Sumatra Location in Indonesia

Runways
Direction	Length		Surface
Direction	ft	m	Surface
06/24	6,069	1,850	Paved
- Source: DAFIF

Malikus Saleh Airport (IATA: LSW, ICAO: WITM) is an airport located in Pinto Makmur, Muara Batu, North Aceh Regency, Aceh province. The airport operated by Pertamina, and later by Government of North Aceh Regency.

== History ==
The airport was built by PT Arun NGL, a natural gas exploration subsidiary of the Indonesian state-owned conglomerate Pertamina, to facilitate the air transport between Lhokseumawe and its vicinity to the regional centre of Medan. The airport was once served by Jatayu Air due to the low passenger traffic between Banda Aceh and Medan. This was due to the ongoing conflict between the Indonesian National Armed Forces (TNI) and the Free Aceh Movement (GAM), which threatened land transportation routes in Aceh.

PT Arun initially used Pelita Air Service (another Pertamina subsidiary)-owned aircraft for daily flights on the Lhokseumawe-Medan route. After several years, flight operations were taken over by the Beechcraft 1900D airliner owned by Travira Air. Prior to PT Arun's closure in 2015, operations and ownership of the airport were transferred to the Lhokseumawe City Government.

Currently, Wings Air is the only airline that serves the Malikus Saleh Airport on the Lhokseumawe-Medan route thrice weekly.

== Airlines and destinations ==
Airlines	Destinations
Wings Air	Medan

== Incidents ==
21 July 2005: A CN-235 aircraft belonging to the Indonesian Air Force (TNI-AU) experienced a disaster while landing at Malikus Saleh Airport. The aircraft was on a flight from Banda Aceh to Lhokseumawe. However, 75 meters before landing, the aircraft's engine failed, causing it to crash and skid for 200 meters. As a result, three TNI members died after the accident. The CN-235 aircraft was carrying 23 passengers, consisting of six army officers, eight air force personnel, and six navy personnel. The rest were civilians.
