= Samudera Pasai Sultanate =

Muslim sultanate in Indonesia

Samudera Pasai Sultanate كسلطانن سامودرا ڤاساي
- 1267–1524
- Capital: Pasai
- Common languages: Old Malay
- Religion: Sunni Islam
- Government: Monarchy
- Sultan
  - 1267–1297: Malik ul Salih (founder)
  - 1514–1517: Zainal Abidin IV (last)
- History
  - Foundation: 1267
  - Portuguese invasion: 1521
  - Conquered by the Aceh Sultanate: 1524
- Currency: Dirham coins
Preceded by	Succeeded by
Peureulak Sultanate	Aceh Sultanate
- Today part of: Indonesia

The Samudera Pasai Sultanate (Malay: كسلطانن سامودرا ڤاساي), also known as Samudera or Pasai or Samudera Darussalam or Pacem, was a Muslim kingdom on the north coast of Sumatra from the 13th to the 16th centuries.

Little evidence has been left to allow for historical study of the kingdom. The kingdom was believed to have been founded by Merah Silu, who later converted to Islam and adopted the name Malik ul Salih, in the year 1267 CE. After the 1521 Portuguese invasion, the garrison evacuated Pasai in 1524 and the first Sultan of Aceh, Ali Mughayat Syah, annexed the territory.

== Etymology ==
Based on the fourteenth century chronicle Hikayat Raja-raja Pasai, 'Samudera' can be inferred to have come from the word "Semudera" ([səmudəra]), which meant 'a very large ant'. The name was given by Merah Silu when he discovered an ant as large as a cat while hunting at a 'high ground'. Eventually, the place was cleared for the establishment of a new state and 'Semudera' was adopted as its name.

'Samudera' is also thought to be derived from the Sanskrit word Samudra, which means "ocean."

Literature also indicates the origin of the name 'Pasai' which came from Si-Pasai, the hunting dog of Sultan Malik al Salleh, who was Merah Silu after his conversion to Islam. The legend narrates that Malik, while hunting with the dog, encountered a deer which was not afraid of the dog's barking but instead barked back. He was bewildered by this and thought that this might be a good sign for the place to be established as a new state for his son, Malik Al Tahir. The dog died soon after the kingdom was founded, and Malik chose to bury him there, naming the kingdom Pasai after him.

In the 14th century, the Italian traveller Odoric of Pordenone used the name Sumoltra for Samudra, and subsequent European writers also used similar forms of the name to refer to the Sumatra island itself.

== History ==
The earliest inscription found during this period is the tombstone of Ibnu Mahmud in Leubok Tuwe, Meurah Mulia, North Aceh. The tombstone dated from Dhul Hijjah 622 Hijri or 1226 CE. The inscription mentioned that Ibn Mahmud was a shahid.

Arab and Indian Muslims had traded in Indonesia and China for many centuries. A Muslim tombstone in eastern Java bears a date corresponding to 1082. But substantial evidence of Islam in Indonesia begins only in northern Sumatra at the end of the 13th century. Two small Muslim trading kingdoms existed by that time at Pasai and Peureulak or Perlak. A 1297 royal tomb at Samudra is inscribed entirely in Arabic. By the 15th century several harbour kingdoms developed, all ruled by local Muslim princes, from the north coast of Java and elsewhere to as far east as Ternate and Tidore in Maluku. Marco Polo spent five months here, he had Ferlec, Basma, and Samara (Samudera) mentioned in his travel story. Another famous traveller Ibn Battuta on his way to China stayed 15 days at Samudera.

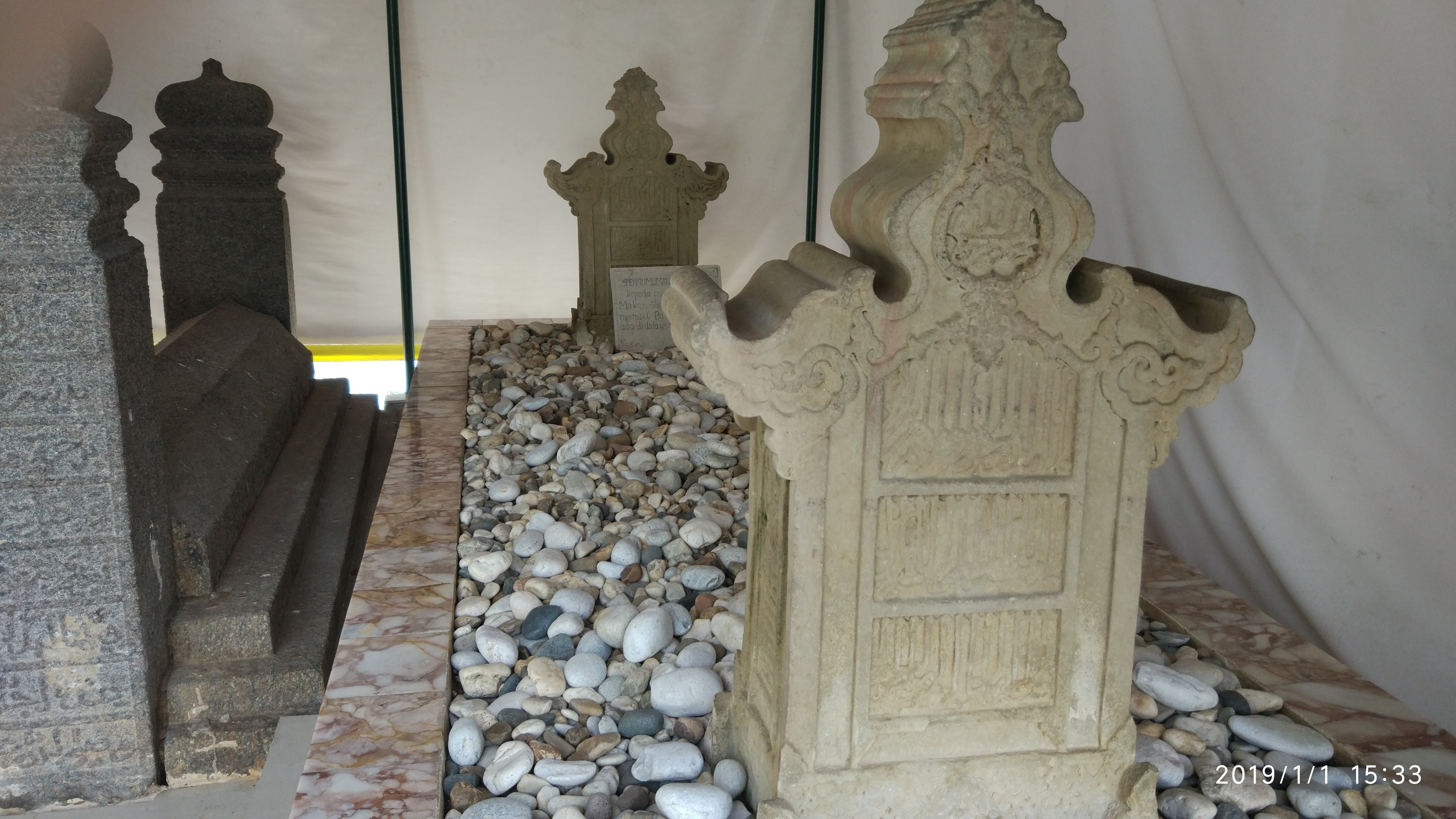
Malik al-Salih tombstone

The establishment of the first Muslim centres in Indonesia was probably a result of commercial circumstances. By the 13th century the collapse of Srivijayan power, drew foreign traders to harbours on the northern Sumatran shores of the Bay of Bengal, safe from the pirate lairs at the southern end of the Strait of Malacca. Northern Sumatra had a hinterland rich in gold and forest produce, and pepper was being cultivated at the beginning of the 15th century. It was accessible to all the merchants of the archipelago who wanted to meet ships from the Indian Ocean.

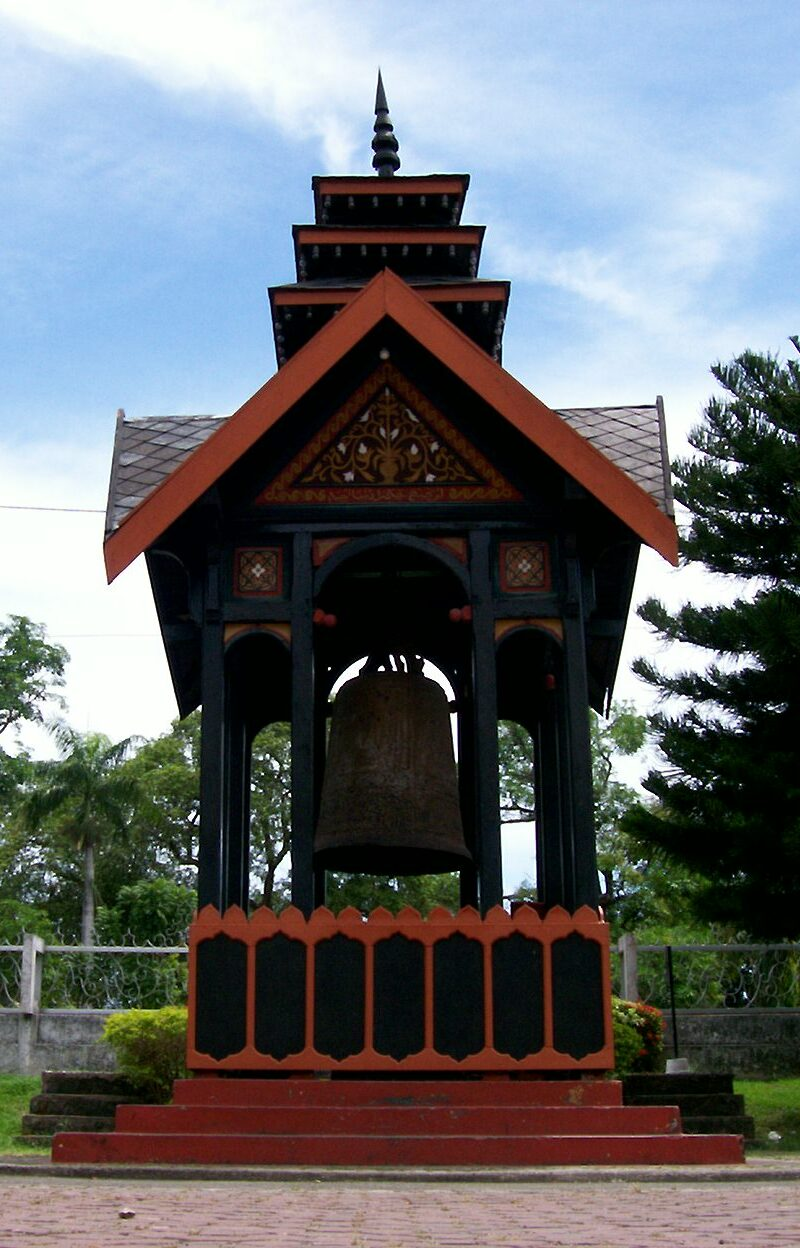
Cakra Donya bell was a gift from Zheng He during his voyage to Pasai.

In the year 1345, Ibn Battuta, a Moroccan traveller visited Samudra Pasai where he notes in his travel log that the ruler of Samudera Pasai was a pious Muslim, who performed his religious duties in utmost zeal. The madh'hab he observed was Imam Al-Shafi'i. At that time Samudera Pasai was the end of Dar al-Islam for no territory east of this was ruled by a Muslim ruler. He praised the kindness and hospitality demonstrated by the sultan of Samudera Pasai. Here he stayed for about two weeks in the wooden walled town as a guest of the sultan, and then the sultan provided him with supplies and sent him on his way on one of sultan's own junks to China.

By the 13th century, Muslim merchants and religious scholars from the Samudera Pasai Sultanate reached the southern Philippine islands, including Basilan and Sulu, through regional maritime trade networks connecting Sumatra with Borneo and the Sulu Sea. Through these contacts, Samudra-Pasai contributed to the introduction and early spread of Islam in these communities.

The Hongwu Emperor of China's Ming dynasty listed Samudera in his admonition the Huang-Ming Zuxun as one of 14 countries which the Ming should not launch a military campaign against. By the end of the 14th century, Samudra-Pasai had become a wealthy commercial centre, giving way in the early 15th century to the better protected harbour of Malacca on the south-west coast of the Malay Peninsula. Majapahit attacked and looted the place in the middle of the 14th century.

Pasai's economic and political power depended almost entirely on foreigners. Muslim traders and teachers probably participated in its administration from the beginning and were bound to introduce religious practices that made them feel at home. The first Muslim beachheads in Indonesia, especially Pasai, were to a considerable extent genuine Muslim creations that commanded the loyalty of the local population and encouraged scholarly activities. Similar new harbour kingdoms formed on the northern coast of Java. Tomé Pires, author of the Suma Oriental, writing not long after 1511, stresses the obscure ethnic origins of the founders of Cirebon, Demak, Japara, and Gresik. These Javanese coastal states served commerce with India and China and especially with Malacca, an importer of Javanese rice. The rulers of Malacca, despite their prestigious Srivijayan origin, accepted Islam precisely to attract Muslim and Javanese traders to their port. Pires also mentions that while Pasai used to be a major rival of trade with Malacca, after the mid-15th century, much trade activity was lost to the benefit of Malacca.

The Portuguese occupied Pasai in 1521, 10 years after their conquest of Malacca. Through the Portuguese, the place become known in Europe as Pacem. The Portuguese garrison evacuated Pasai in 1524 and the first Sultan of Aceh, Ali Mughayat Syah, annexed the territory.

== List of rulers ==
These are the list of rulers who ruled the Samudera Pasai Sultanate:

Period	Name of Sultan or Gelar	Notes and important historical events
1267–1297	Sultan Malikussaleh (Meurah Silu)	Founder of Samudra Pasai kingdom
1297–1326	Sultan Muhammad Malikuzzahir	Introduced gold coins
1326–1340	Sultan Ahmad Malikuzzahir	Visited by Ibnu Batutah
1340–1355	Malik Salahuddin	Attacked the Karang Baru Kingdom, Tamiang
1360–1369	Malikuzzahir	
1360/69–1380/89	Malikah Wabisa (Nur Ilah)	Minye Tujoh inscription
1394–1400	Sultan Zainal Abidin I	Attacked by Majapahit
1406–1428	Sultanah Nahrasiyah	Glory period of Samudra Pasai
1428–1438	Sultan Zainal Abidin II	
1438–1462	Sultan Shalahuddin	
1462–1464	Sultan Ahmad II	
1464–1466	Sultan Abu Zaid Ahmad III	
1466–1466	Sultan Ahmad IV	
1466–1468	Sultan Mahmud	
1468–1474	Sultan Zainal Abidin III	Toppled by his brother
1474–1495	Sultan Muhammad Syah II	
1495–1495	Sultan Al-Kamil	
1495–1506	Sultan Adlullah	
1506–1507	Sultan Muhammad Syah III	Has two tombs
1507–1509	Sultan Abdullah	
1509–1514	Sultan Ahmad V	Capture of Malacca (1511)
1514–1517	Sultan Zainal Abidin IV	

== Family tree ==
Family tree of Samudera Pasai Monarchs

Al-Malik; Al-Salih^{(1)} r. 1267–1297
Al-Malik; Al-Zahir I Muhammad I^{(2)} r. 1297–1326	♀ Princess	Raja Kadah
Ahmad I^{(3)} r. 1326–1330	♀ Princess	Raja Khan
Ahmad	Zainal; Abidin I^{(5)} r. 1349–1406	Al-Malik; Al-Zahir II^{(4)} r. 1330–1349
Zainal; Abidin II^{(7)} r. 1428–1438	♀ Nahrasyiyah^{(6)} r. 1406–1428
Salahuddin^{(8)} r. 1438–1462	Mansur	Ahmad II^{(9)} r. 1462–1464	Ahmad III^{(10)} r. 1464–1466	Ahmad IV^{(11)} r. 1466–1466	Mahmud^{(12)} r. 1466–1468
Al-Kamil^{(15)} r. 1495–1495	Adlullah^{(16)} r. 1495–1506	Zainal; Abidin III^{(13)} r. 1468–1474	Muhammad; Syah II^{(14)} r. 1474–1495	Muhammad; Syah III^{(17)} r. 1506–1507	Abdullah^{(18)} r. 1507–1509	Zainal; Abidin IV^{(20)} r. 1514–1517
Ahmad V^{(19)} r. 1509–1514

== Historical heritage ==
The discovery of the tomb of Sultan Malik as-Saleh (696 H or 1267 AD), was referred to by historians as a sign that Islam had entered the Archipelago around the 13th century. Although there is an opinion that the possibility of Islam has come earlier than that. The story of the Pasai Kings is indeed full of myths and legends but the description of the story has helped in uncovering the dark side of history of the existence of this kingdom. The kingdom's past glory has inspired its people to re-use the name of the founder of this kingdom for the University of Malikussaleh in Lhokseumawe.

== See also ==
- Malikussaleh
- List of Sunni Muslim dynasties
