= Bali–Java Powerline =

Location
- Country: Indonesia
- Province: Bali; East Java
- Coordinates: 8°5′58.55″S 114°26′12.52″E (Bali tower)

Ownership information
- Owner: PT PLN

Technical information
- Type: Overhead line
- Total length: 219.16 km (136.18 mi)
- No. of towers: 512
- Capacity: 1,600 MW
- AC voltage: 500 kV

The Bali–Java Powerline is a planned electric power transmission line in Indonesia. It will be used for the crossing of the Bali Strait between Java and Bali. If built, the towers will be the world's tallest electricity pylons with a height of 376 metres (1,234 ft). As of January 2018, the project is underway with planning for land acquisition. However, as of April 2018, there are also indications that the project may never come to fruition as there is substantial resistance to the project for religious and cultural reasons.

The line on the Java side will begin in at the Paiton power plant, then through Watu Dodol in Banyuwangi Regency, and on to Bali. On the Bali side, it would be in parts of western Buleleng, Jembrana, Tabanan and Badung regencies.

The two towers that will carry the line over the Bali Strait (Selatbali) have planned positions as follows: 8°5′21.73″S 114°24′53.12″E for the 363-metre tower (1,191 ft) on Java and 8°5′58.55″S 114°26′12.52″E for the 376-metre tower (1,234 ft) on the Bali side.
