= Lhokseumawe =

City in Aceh, Indonesia

Lhokseumawe Lhôk Seumaw‘è (Acehnese)
- City
- City of Lhokseumawe; Kota Lhokseumawe

Other transcription(s)
  - Jawoe: تلوق سماوءي
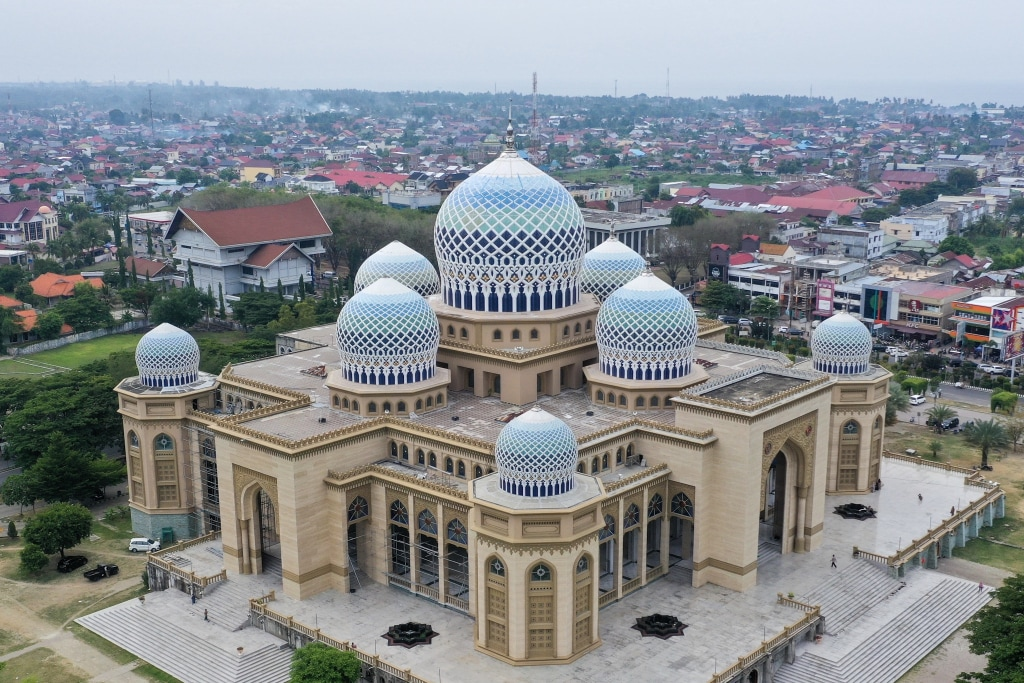
- Islamic center of Lhokseumawe Mosque

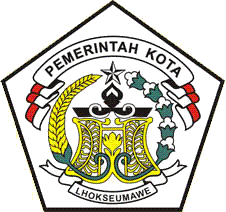
- Coat of arms
- Motto(s): Lhokseumawe Indah (Beautiful Lhokseumawe)
- Location within Aceh

- Location in Northern Sumatra, Sumatra and Indonesia Lhokseumawe (Sumatra) Lhokseumawe (Indonesia)
- Coordinates: 5°11′17″N 97°8′25″E
- Country: Indonesia
- Province: Aceh
- City Founded: 21 June 2001; 14 August 1986

Government
  - Mayor: Sayuti Abubakar
  - Vice: Husaini
  - Secretary: Teuku Adnan

Area
  - Total: 181.06 km^{2} (69.91 sq mi)
- Elevation: 2–24 m (6.6–78.7 ft)

Population (mid 2025 estimate)
  - Total: 200,876
  - Density: 1,109.4/km^{2} (2,873.4/sq mi)

Demographics
  - Languages: Indonesian (official); Acehnese

City Growth
  - HDI: 80,26 (2023)
  - GDP: Rp. 10.598.205.71 (Million Rupiah)
- Time zone: UTC+7 (IWST)
- Postcode: 24315 - 24375
- Area code: (+62) 645
- Website: lhokseumawekota.go.id
- For Official Government Website see below of this page

Lhokseumawe (Indonesian pronunciation: [loksuˈmawe]; Acehnese: Lhôk Seumaw‘è, [lʱoʔ s̻̪ɯ.ma.ˈwɛ̃], Jawoe: تلوق سماوءي), is the second largest city (by population, after Banda Aceh) in Aceh province, Indonesia, having recently overtaken Langsa. The city covers a land area of 181.06 square kilometres, and had a population of 171,163 at the 2010 census and 188,713 at the 2020 census; the official estimate as of mid 2025 was 200,876 (comprising 98,717 males and 99,988 females in 2024). The city is a key regional centre important for the economy of Aceh.

== History ==
The name Lhokseumawe comes from the words lhok and seumawe. Lhok means "deep", "bay", and "ocean trenches", and Lhokseumawe means the swirling water in the sea along the offshore of Banda Sakti and its surroundings. The city was formerly part of North Aceh Regency, from which it was separated to form an independent city on 21 June 2001. The area is linked to the emergence of the kingdom of Samudera Pasai around the 13th century, which later came under the sovereignty of Sultanate of Aceh in 1511.

=== Pre Colonial Era ===
Map of Aceh Sultanate during the reign of Sultan Iskandar Muda

The Sultanate of Aceh was established by Sultan Ali Mughayatsyah in 1511. Later, during its golden era, in the 17th century, its territory and political influence expanded as far as Satun in southern Thailand, Johor in Malay Peninsula, and Siak in what is today the province of Riau. As was the case with most non-Javan pre-colonial states, Acehnese power expanded outward by sea rather than inland. As it expanded down the Sumatran coast, its main competitors were Johor and Portuguese Malacca on the other side of the Straits of Malacca. It was this seaborne trade focus that saw Aceh rely on rice imports from north Java rather than develop self sufficiency in rice production. After the Portuguese occupation of Malacca in 1511, many Islamic traders passing the Malacca Straits shifted their trade to Banda Aceh and increased the Acehnese rulers' wealth. During the reign of Sultan Iskandar Muda in the 17th century, Aceh's influence extended to most of Sumatra and the Malay Peninsula. Aceh allied itself with the Ottoman Empire and the Dutch East India Company in their struggle against the Portuguese and the Johor Sultanate. Acehnese military power waned gradually thereafter, and Aceh ceded its territory of Pariaman in West Sumatra to the Dutch in the 18th century.

=== Colonial Era ===
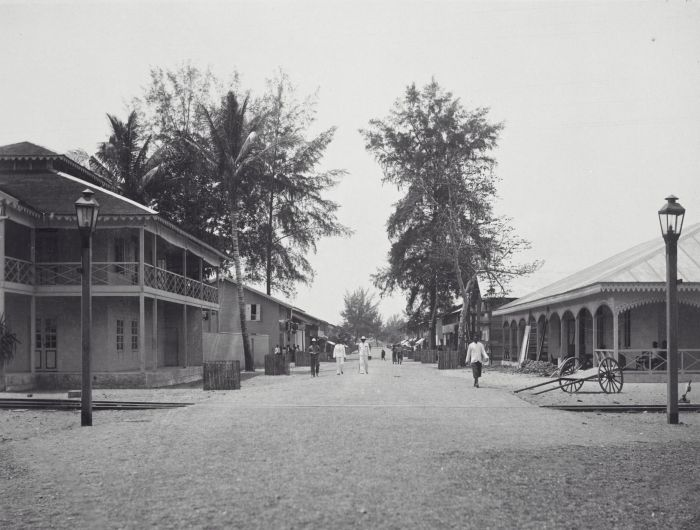
Street scene in Lhokseumawe in the Dutch colonial period

Before the 20th century, the country was ruled by uleebalang Kutablang. In 1903, after resistance fighters against Dutch colonists weakened Aceh, Aceh began to master.

Lhokseumawe conquered areas and from then on the status of Lhokseumawe was "Bestuur Van Lhokseumawe" with Zelf Bestuurder is Teuku Abdul Lhokseumawe subordinate Controeleur aspirants and also domiciled in Lhokseumawe and assistant resident district officer or Regent.

In the second decade of the 20th century, among the entire mainland of Aceh, a small island about 11 km^{2} widely separated by Krueng Cunda River. filled buildings General Government, Military, and Transportation Railway by the Dutch government. Small islands with villages of Keude Aceh, Kampung Jawa, Kuta blang, Mon Geudong, Teumpok Teungoh, Hagu Kampung, Uteuen bayi and Ujong Blang are entirely new 5,500 plural in Lhokseumawe call. Building by building fills this land until the city has realized embryos harbor, market, railway station and the offices of government agencies.

=== Independence era ===
On 21 September and 22 September 1953, Darul Islam forces attacked Lhokseumawe twice, but the Indonesian army repelled the attack.

Since the Declaration of Independence, the Government of the Republic of Indonesia has not established systemic to this district. At first Lhokseumawe combined with Bestuurder Van Cunda. The mainland population is increasingly crowded, coming from surrounding areas such as Buloh Blang Ara, Matangkuli, Blang Jruen, Lhoksukon, Nisam, Cunda and Pidie.

In 1956 the Emergency Law No. 7 of 1956, the autonomous regions were formed into regencies within the region of North Sumatra province, where one of them became the North Aceh Regency with its capital at Lhokseumawe.

Then in 1964 the Decree of the Governor of Aceh Special Region Number 34/GA/1964 dated 30 November 1964, it was determined that Kemukiman Banda Sakti in Muara Dua, the District used its own under the name of the District Banda Sakti.

Based on the Act No. 5 of 1974 on the Principles of Regional Administration, Lhokseumawe began to improve the status of the City, on 14 August 1986, with the Regional Regulation No. 32 of 1986 (Establishment of the City of Lhokseumawe) signed by President of Indonesia Suharto, which was inaugurated by the Minister of Roestam Soeparjo country on 31 August 1987. Given that it is de jure and de facto Lhokseumawe became the city with an area of 181.06 km^{2} which includes 101 villages and 6 urban villages in five districts, namely the Districts of Banda Sakti, Muara Dua, Dewantara, Muara Batu, and Blang Mangat.

From 1988 onwards, the idea of raising the status of the town began. Law No. 2 of 2001 (dated 21 June 2001), signed by the president of Indonesia Abdurrahman Wahid, established Lhokseumawe as a separate municipality whose territory then included three districts, namely the Districts of Banda Sakti, Muara Dua and Blang Mangat (Dewantara and Muara Batu Districts remained in North Aceh Regency). In 2006 the District of Muara Dua was split into two - Muara Dua and Muara Satu - so Lhokseumawe now comprises four districts.

== Geography ==
Lhokseumawe City is located between 4˚ - 5˚ North Latitude and 96˚ - 97˚ East Longitude with an average altitude of 13 metres above sea level. Lhokseumawe was given the status of an independent city (separate from North Aceh Regency, which surrounds it on all the landward sides) based on Law Number 2 of 2001, dated 21 June 2001. Lhokseumawe City is divided into 4 districts, 9 residents, 68 villages, and 259 sub-villages within the boundaries of the area. Lhokseumawe forms a semi-enclave within North Aceh Regency.

Direction	Location
North	Selat Malaka
South	Kecamatan Kuta Makmur, Kabupaten Aceh Utara
West	Kecamatan Dewantara, Kabupaten Aceh Utara
East	Kecamatan Syamtalira Bayu, Kabupaten Aceh Utara

== Climate ==
Lhokseumawe has a tropical rainforest climate (Af) with moderate to heavy rainfall year-round.

Climate data for Lhokseumawe
Month	Jan	Feb	Mar	Apr	May	Jun	Jul	Aug	Sep	Oct	Nov	Dec	Year
Mean daily maximum °C (°F)	30.5 (86.9)	31.6 (88.9)	32.4 (90.3)	32.6 (90.7)	31.9 (89.4)	32.0 (89.6)	31.5 (88.7)	31.7 (89.1)	31.0 (87.8)	31.0 (87.8)	30.4 (86.7)	30.3 (86.5)	31.4 (88.5)
Daily mean °C (°F)	26.6 (79.9)	27.2 (81.0)	27.7 (81.9)	28.1 (82.6)	27.7 (81.9)	27.8 (82.0)	27.2 (81.0)	27.4 (81.3)	27.1 (80.8)	27.2 (81.0)	26.8 (80.2)	26.7 (80.1)	27.3 (81.1)
Mean daily minimum °C (°F)	22.8 (73.0)	22.8 (73.0)	23.0 (73.4)	23.6 (74.5)	23.6 (74.5)	23.6 (74.5)	23.0 (73.4)	23.2 (73.8)	23.2 (73.8)	23.5 (74.3)	23.2 (73.8)	23.1 (73.6)	23.2 (73.8)
Average rainfall mm (inches)	164 (6.5)	64 (2.5)	75 (3.0)	95 (3.7)	123 (4.8)	87 (3.4)	87 (3.4)	102 (4.0)	128 (5.0)	183 (7.2)	189 (7.4)	234 (9.2)	1,531 (60.1)
Source: Climate-Data.org

== Administrative districts ==
Lhokseumawe City is an urban area surrounded on the landward side by Aceh Utara Regency and is located on the northeast coast of Sumatra. Being between Banda Aceh and Medan, Lhokseumawe City holds a strategic position as a distribution channel for trading traffic in Aceh Special region.

When separated from North Aceh Regency in 2001, the city was divided administratively into three districts (kecamatan); since then, the creation in 2006 of Muara Satu District (formerly part of Muara Dua District) has increased the number to four. These are tabulated below with their areas and their populations at the 2010 and 2020 censuses, together with the official estimates as of mid 2025. The table also includes the locations of the district administrative centres, the number of villages (gampong) in each district - 68 in total, and its post code.

Kode Wilayah	Name of District (kecamatan)	Area in km^{2}	Pop'n at 2010 census	Pop'n at 2020 census	Pop'n mid 2025 estimate	Admin centre	No. of villages	Post code
11.73.03	Blang Mangat	56.12	21,689	26,162	29,286	Punteut	22	24375
11.73.01	Muara Dua	57.80	44,209	50,929	54,586	Cunda	17	24351
11.73.04	Muara Satu	55.90	31,723	33,820	35,866	Batuphat Barat	11	24353
11.73.02	Banda Sakti	11.24	73,542	77,802	81,138	Kota Lhokseumawe	18	24351 ^{(a)}

Note: (a) except for the 5 gampong of Tumpok Teumpoh (post code 24311), Simpang Empat (24313), Kota Lhokseumawe (24314), Pusong Baru (24314) and Jawa Baru (24315).

Source : Lhokseumawe Dalam Angka 2013 / Lhokseumawe in Figures 2013; Badan Pusat Statistik, Jakarta, for later figures.

Judging by the number of village officials, Blang Mangat District is the biggest district, consisting of 22 villages (comprising 78 dusun or hamlets), with 259 village officials.

== Health ==
Health facilities are available in Lhokseumawe :

Health facilities	Total	Unit
Puskesmas	6	Unit
Puskesmas pembantu	12	Unit
Puskesmas keliling	5	Unit
Polindes	32	Unit
Doctors Practice	85	Unit
Dentist Practice	9	Unit
Drug store	77	Unit

The number of available health workers is:

Health workers	Total	Unit
Doctor	60	People
Dentist	5	People
Medical Servant	399	People
Nurse	194	People
Midwife	151	People
Pharmacy personnel	9	People
Nutritionist	4	People
Sanitation expert	7	People

- note : Not include private companies, Only Government Facilities and worker

Source : Lhokseumawe Dalam Angka 2013 / Lhokseumawe In Figures 2013

== Religion ==
Religions	Total
Islam	190,553
Buddhism	503
Protestant	487
Catholic	144
Hinduism	1

Religious facilities are available in Lhokseumawe :

Religious facilities	Total	Unit
Mosque	118	Unit
Mushala	76	Unit
Church	1	Unit
Monastery	1	Unit

Source : Lhokseumawe Dalam Angka 2013 / Lhokseumawe In Figures 2013

== Tourism ==
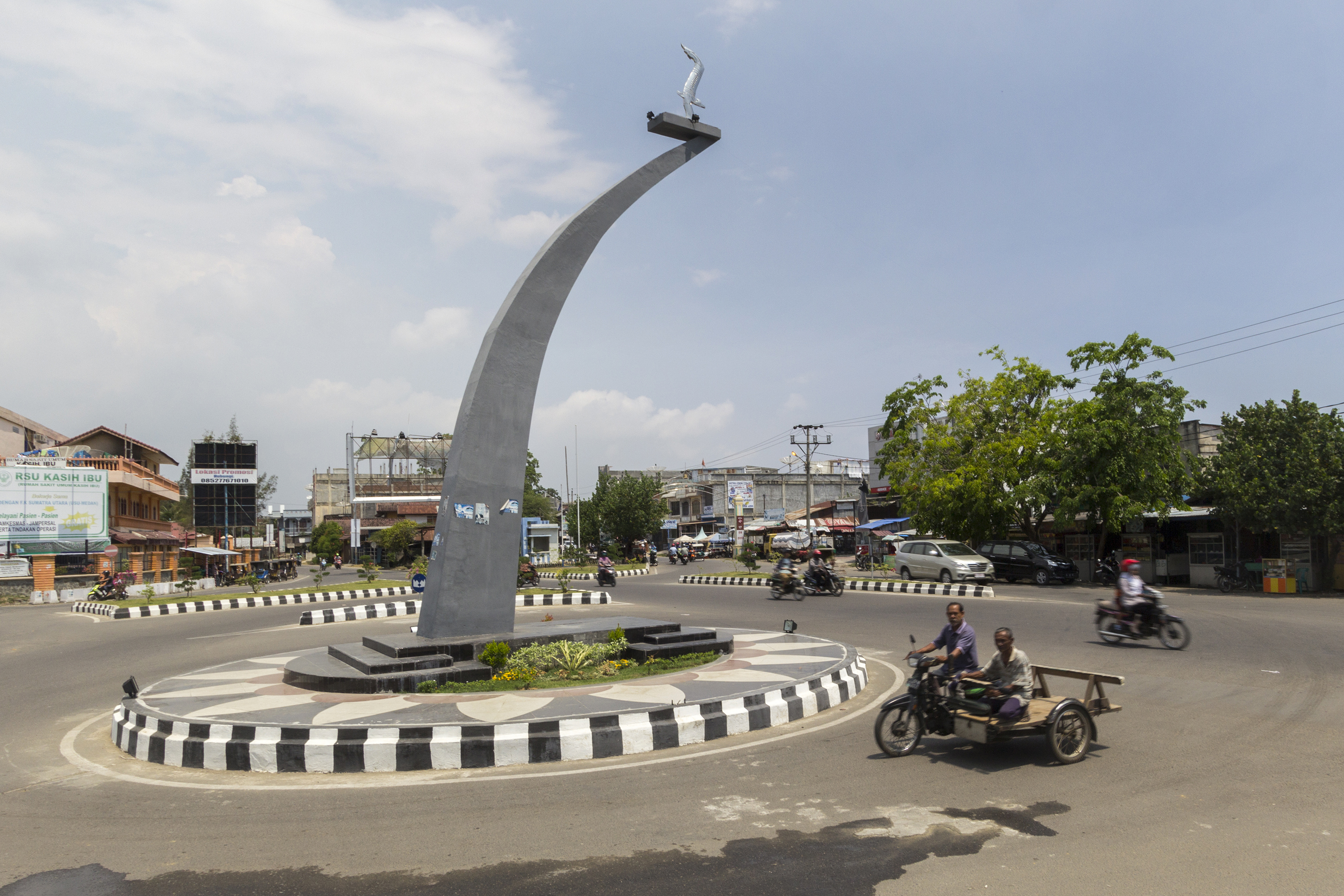
Rencong monument roundabout

Some attractions are rated strongly support the ability of future Tourism Sector is:

- Ujong Blang Beach
- Rancong Beach
- Seumadu Island
- Reklamasi Pusong Beach
- Meuraksa Beach
- KP3 Beach
- Lhokseumawe Min 3 Kota
- Krueng Cunda River
- Waduk Pusong
- Riyadhah Park
- P. Ramlee Village

== Transportation ==
=== Airport ===
- Air : Malikus Saleh Airport & Lhoksukon Airport

=== Seaport ===
- Sea : Kruengeukeuh Seaport

=== Road and highway ===
- Land: Terpadu Terminal

=== Public transport ===
One of the unique features of Lhokseumawe city is the motorized rickshaws known as Becak Motor or Becak Mesin. The becaks are found almost everywhere. The fare to ride a becak is relatively cheap and is usually negotiated beforehand.

There is also more public transport like minibuses, known as Labi Labi or Angkutan Kota (Angkot). The Labi Labi can be found easily on medium to highly congested roads, and the fare to ride a Labi Labi is very cheap.

== Media ==
=== Radio ===
The city of Lhokseumawe has several radio stations:

Name	Frequency	Signal	Station
RRI Pro-1,	89,3-MHz	FM	
CITIS FM	94.4-MHz	FM	
RRI Pro-3,	95,2-MHz	FM	
Radio SaPa FM	96.0-MHz	FM	
RRI Pro-2,	101.9-MHz	FM	
Bujang Salim FM	101,5-MHz	FM	
Vina Vira FM	101,1-MHz	FM	
Istiqomah Arun FM	102,7-MHz	FM	
Adyemaja FM	103,5-MHz	FM	
Radio Rimba Pase FM	106.6-MHz	FM	
Radio Gisa FM	107,7-MHz	FM	

=== TV channels ===
Lhoksumawe City has 18 TV channels (17 national and 1 local):

TV channel	Frequency	Network	Status
National (17 Channel)
TVRI Nasional	30 UHF	TVRI	National
RCTI	24 UHF	MNC	National
SCTV	34 UHF	Emtek	National
MNCTV	28 UHF	MNC	National
ANTV	22 UHF	Viva	National
Indosiar	46 UHF	Emtek	National
MetroTV	52 UHF	Media	National
Trans TV	56 UHF	Trans	National
Global TV	28 UHF	MNC	National
Trans7	38 UHF	Trans	National
tvOne	48 UHF	Viva	National
iNews TV	50 UHF	MNC	National
RTV	32 UHF	Grup Rajawali	National
Kompas TV	40 UHF	KG	National
NET.	58 UHF	Indika	National
BeritaSatu	60 UHF	BeritaSatu Media Holdings	National
INTV	62 UHF	Netwave Group	National
Local(1 Channel)
Puja TV.	30 UHF	Puja Group	Local

== See also ==
- Bappeda kota lhokseumawe

== Official Government links ==
For Any information about lhokseumawe city, you can ask directly to official government link below

- (in Indonesian) Official City
- (in Indonesian) Regional Development Planning Board
- (in Indonesian) Regional Network documentation and Law information
- (in Indonesian) Auction services procurement
