= East Natuna gas field =

Natural gas field in Natuna Island, Indonesia

East Natuna
- Country: Indonesia
- Region: South China Sea
- Location: Greater Sarawak Basin (East Natuna Basin)
- Offshore/onshore: offshore
- Operator: Pertamina
- Partners: Pertamina; ExxonMobil; Total S.A. PTT Exploration and Production

Field history
- Discovery: 1973

Production
- Estimated gas in place: 222,000×10^{9} cu ft (6,300×10^{9} m^{3})
- Recoverable gas: 46,000×10^{9} cu ft (1,300×10^{9} m^{3})
- Producing formations: Terumbu Formation (Middle to Late Miocene)

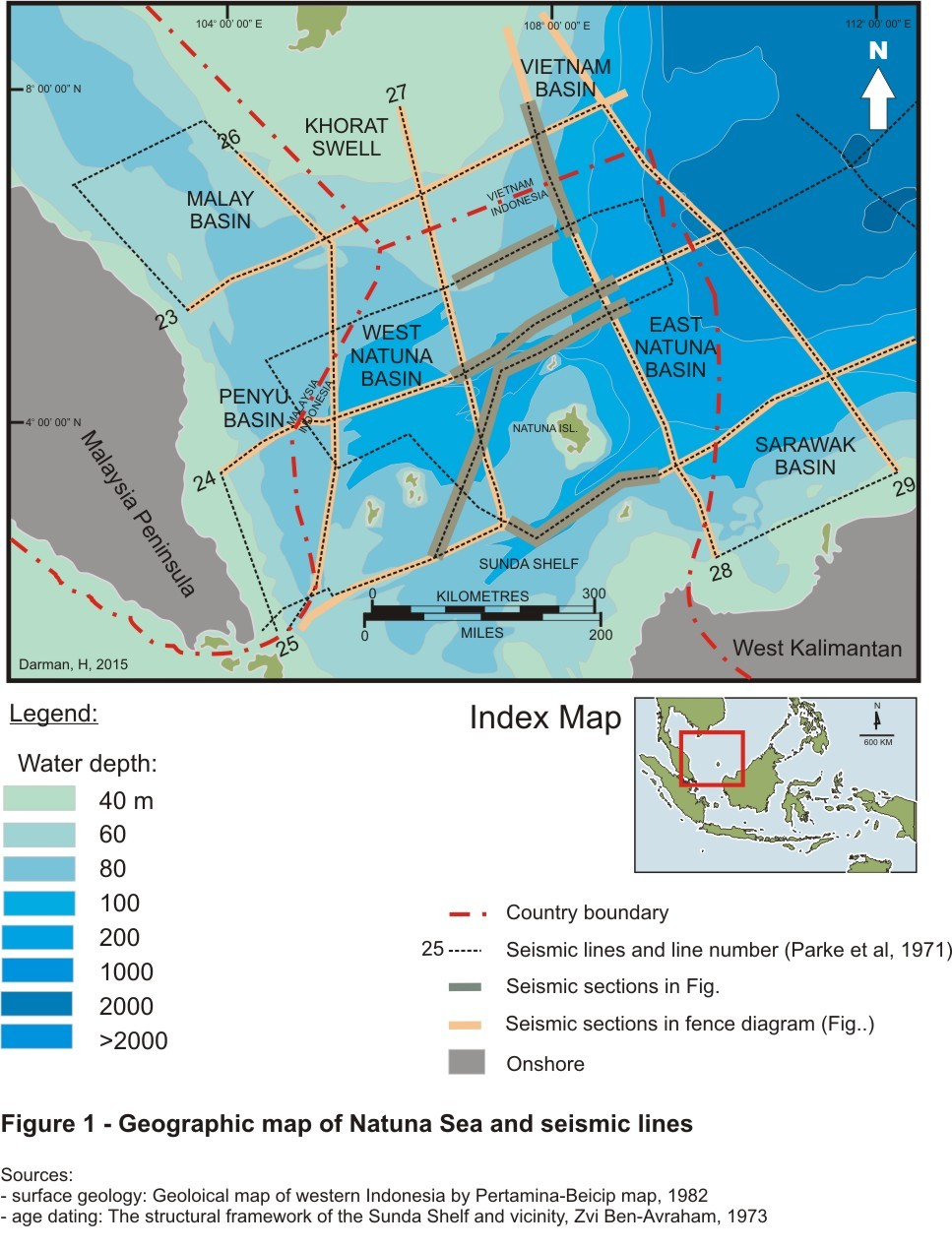
Map of Natuna Sea

The East Natuna gas field (former name: Natuna D-Alpha block) is a large natural gas field located in the South China Sea off northern Natuna Island, Indonesia. It is within the disagreed area claimed by China.

== History ==
The field was discovered in 1973 by Agip. In 1980, the Indonesian state-owned oil company Pertamina and Exxon formed a joint venture to develop Natuna D-Alpha. However, due to the high CO_{2} content the partnership was not able to start production. In 1995, the Indonesian government signed a contract with Exxon but in 2007, the contract was terminated. In 2008, the block was awarded to Pertamina.

The new agreement was signed between Pertamina and ExxonMobil in 2010. Correspondingly, the field was renamed East Natuna to be geographically more precise. In 2011, the principal of agreement was signed between Pertamina, ExxonMobil, Total S.A. and Petronas. In 2012, Petronas was replaced by PTT Exploration and Production. As of 2016, negotiations about the new principal of agreement have not finalized and consequently, a production sharing contract is not signed.

== Reserves and development ==
The East Natuna gas field is located in the Greater Sarawak Basin (East Natuna Basin) about 1,100 kilometres (680 mi) north of Jakarta and 225 kilometres (140 mi) northeast of the Natuna Islands covering approximately 310 square kilometres (120 sq mi). The reservoir is at a water depth of 145 metres (476 ft) within the Miocene Terumbu Formation with a crest at 2,658 metres (8,720 ft) subsea. A maximum column height is 1,638 metres (5,374 ft). The thickness of the formation varies between 300 and 1,525 metres (984 and 5,003 ft). The estimated resource in place of the East Natuna field is around 222 trillion cubic feet (6.3 trillion cubic metres), of which total proven reserves of natural gas are 46 trillion cubic feet (1.3 trillion cubic metres), and production is forecast to be around 1.98 billion cubic feet per day (56 million cubic metres per day). The CO_{2} content of the resource is about 71%.

The development of East Natuna is expected to cost US$20–40 billion. To save costs, the joint development of East Natuna, Tuna block (Premier Oil 65%, Mitsui Oil Exploration 35%), and South Natuna Sea Block B (ConocoPhillips 40%, Inpex 35%, Chevron Corporation 25%) has been proposed. Production is expected to be viable only if the oil price exceeds $100 per barrel. The production is expected to start not before 2030.
