= North Aceh Regency =

Regency in Aceh, Indonesia

North Aceh Regency Kabupaten Aceh Utara
- Regency
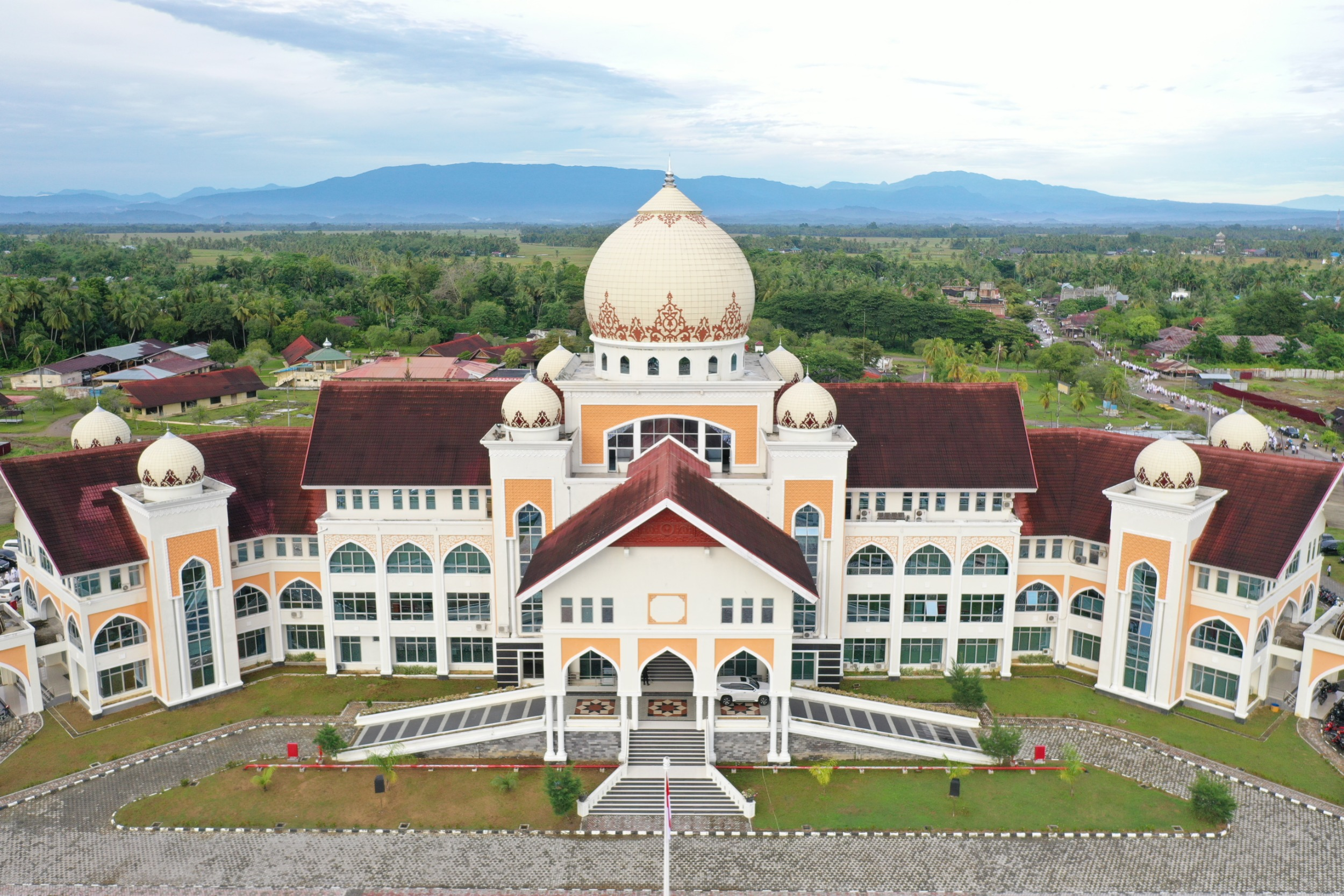
- Regent office of North Aceh in Lhoksukon

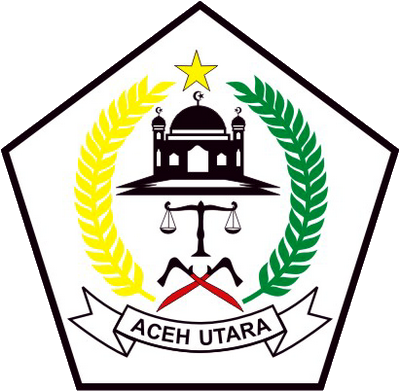
- Seal

- Location within Aceh

- Location in Northern Sumatra, Sumatra and Indonesia North Aceh Regency (Sumatra) North Aceh Regency (Indonesia)
- Coordinates: 5.00°N 96.75°E
- Country: Indonesia
- Region: Sumatra
- Province: Aceh
- Established: 1956
- Regency seat: Lhoksukon

Government
  - Regent: Ismail A. Jalil
  - Vice Regent: Tarmizi

Area
  - Total: 2,705.26 km^{2} (1,044.51 sq mi)

Population (mid 2025 estimate)
  - Total: 647,619
  - Density: 239.393/km^{2} (620.024/sq mi)
- Time zone: UTC+7 (IWST)
- Area code: (+62) 645
- Website: acehutara.go.id

North Aceh Regency (Indonesian: Kabupaten Aceh Utara) is a regency in Aceh province of Indonesia. It is located on the island of Sumatra. The regency covers a land area of 2,705.26 square kilometres and had a population of 534,085 at the 2010 census and 602,793 at the 2020 Census; the official estimate as of mid 2025 was 647,619 (comprising 322,625 males and 324,994 females).

The administrative centre is now at the town of Lhoksukon; this followed the splitting off of the western districts from the regency to form (by Law No. 48 of 1999) a separate Bireuen Regency on 4 October 1999, and then the creation (by Law No. 2 of 2001) of the independent city of Lhokseumawe out of what was formerly the capital, which was cut out of the regency on 21 June 2001.

== Economy ==
This regency is included in one of the largest industrial regions outside Java, especially with the opening of liquid gas processing industry plants based on PT Arun LNG in Lhokseumawe, 1974. There were several large factories nearby at the time: PT.Kertas Kraft Aceh, pabrik Pupuk AAF (Aceh Asean Fertilizer) and pabrik Pupuk Iskandar Muda (PIM). The Port of Krueng Geukueh is located in the regency.

In the agricultural sector, the regency has a good reputation as an important rice producer. The whole North Aceh Regency has the greatest potential of any region in Aceh and its income per capita is above Rp 1.4 million (without oil and natural gas) or Rp 6 million (with oil and natural gas).

Gas and petroleum fields were found in Lhokseumawe, North Aceh's former capital city around the 1970s. Then, many investors interested in its natural resources came to Aceh. Since then, liquefied natural gas (LNG) processed in refinery of PT. Arun Natural Gas Liquefaction (NGL) Co, coming from the installation of PT. ExxonMobil Oil Indonesia (EMOI) in Lhokseumawe industrial zone (now : Arun Lhokseumawe Special Economic Zone), had changed this regency to modern petrochemistry industrial region.

There are two sectors dominating economical activity in North Aceh, mining and excavation, and processing industrial sector. As for the mining, the gas wells processed by PT. EMOI being one of the sector's pioneering factors.

== Religion ==
North Aceh's inhabitants are predominantly Muslim. Minorities have the freedom to worship according to their respective religions.

== Border ==
- North: Malacca Strait
- East: East Aceh Regency
- South: Central Aceh Regency
- West: Bireuen Regency

== Administrative districts ==
The regency is divided administratively into twenty-seven districts (kecamatan), listed below with their areas and their populations at the 2010 Census and the 2020 Census, together with the official estimates as of mid 2025. The table also includes the locations of the district administrative centres, the number of administrative villages (gampong) within each district, and its post code.

Kode Wilayah	Name of District (kecamatan)	Area in km^{2}	Pop'n Census 2010	Pop'n Census 2020	Pop'n Estimate mid 2025	Admin centre	No. of villages	Post code
11.08.15	Sawang	379.33	34,024	39,063	41,639	Sawang	39	24377
11.08.16	Nisam	70.44	17,255	19,663	21,659	Keude Amplah	29	24378
11.08.27	Nisam Antara	147.36	12,195	13,465	14,250	Alue Dua	6	24379
11.08.26	Banda Baro	26.91	7,437	7,926	8,613	Ulee Nyeue	9	24376
11.08.03	Kuta Makmur	143.37	22,208	26,379	29,712	Buloh Blang Awa	39	24371
11.08.22	Simpang Keramat	95.51	8,781	9,957	11,599	Kedee Simpang Empat	16	24313
11.08.11	Syamtalira Bayu	33.71	19,110	22,393	23,775	Baru	38	24370
11.08.25	Geureudong Pase	107.62	4,484	5,534	6,243	Mbang	11	24373
11.08.07	Meurah Mulia	39.55	17,756	21,024	22,966	Jungka Gajah	50	24372
11.08.05	Matangkuli	27.39	16,558	18,756	20,442	Matang Kuli	49	24386
11.08.20	Paya Bakong	271.03	12,794	15,555	16,611	Keude Paya Bakong	39	24383
11.08.24	Pirak Timu	34.06	7,474	8,799	9,478	Alue Bungkoh	23	24384
11.08.17	Cot Girek	307.32	18,492	20,305	21,339	Cot Girek	24	24352
11.08.14	Tanah Jambo Aye	93.45	39,461	44,222	46,622	Panton Labu	47	24395
11.08.18	Langkahan	181.85	21,090	22,518	24,140	Langkahan	23	24394
11.08.09	Seunuddon	77.41	23,457	25,982	27,337	Seunuddon	33	24393
11.08.01	Baktiya	122.96	32,731	37,657	41,175	Alue Le Puteh	57	24392
11.08.19	Baktiya Barat (West Baktiya)	73.27	17,082	18,980	20,536	Keude Sampoiniet	26	24396
11.08.04	Lhoksukon	146.96	44,358	49,733	52,992	Lhoksukon	75	24382
11.08.12	Tanah Luas	156.27	22,217	25,193	27,399	Blang Jruen	57	24387
11.08.21	Nibong	17.39	9,121	10,778	11,696	Keude Nibong	20	24385
11.08.08	Samudera	32.59	24,589	27,147	29,339	Geudong	40	24374
11.08.10	Syamtalira Aron	24.59	16,591	19,345	20,384	Simpang Muling	34	24381
11.08.13	Tanah Pasir	13.77	8,445	9,978	10,542	Jrat Manyang	18	24390
11.08.23	Lapang	25.50	7,974	8,806	9,168	Lapang	11	24391
11.08.06	Muara Batu	27.29	24,585	27,753	29,683	Krueng Mane	24	24355
11.08.02	Dewantara	28.38	43,797	45,882	48,280	Krueng Geukueh	15	24354
	Totals	2,705.26	534,085	602,793	647,619	Lhoksukon	852	

== Politics ==
The current regent is Muhammad Thaib also known as Cek Mad.
