= List of Acehnese people =

This is a list of notable Acehnese people.

== Academics ==
- Dina Astita, tsunami survivor
- Teuku Jacob, paleoanthropologist

== Athletes ==
- Calvin Verdonk, footballer, Indonesian national team, 1/2 Acehnese
- Ismed Sofyan, football athlete
- Jalwandi, football
- Martunis Sarbini, footballer, former Sporting CP player
- Teuku Ichsan

== Businesspeople ==
- Surya Paloh, owner of Metro TV

== Entertainment ==
- P. Ramlee, Malaysian film director
- Qory Sandioriva, Puteri Indonesia 2010, Miss Universe Indonesia 2010, film actress, model
- Bulan Sofya, film actress
- Ratu Sofya, film actress
- Beby Tsabina, Indonesian film actress, model and singer
- Enzy Storia, artist, presenter, singer and model
- Cut Tari, soap opera actress and model
- Ade Paloh, Singer, Frontman of Indonesian Band “Sore”

== Islamic scholars ==
- Hamzah Fansuri
- Nuruddin ar-Raniri

== Sultanates ==
- Alauddin al Qahhar, a sultan of Aceh Sultanate
- Ali Mughayat Syah, a sultan of Aceh Sultanate
- Iskandar Muda, a sultan of Aceh Sultanate
- Iskandar Thani, a sultan of Aceh Sultanate
- Ratu Zainatuddin of Aceh, a sultana of Aceh Sultanate
- Salahuddin of Aceh, a sultan of Aceh Sultanate
- Ratu Safiatuddin Taj ul-Alam, a sultana of Aceh Sultanate

== Military ==
- Daud Bereueh, military Governor of Aceh
- Hasan di Tiro, founder of the Free Aceh Movement

== National heroes ==
- Cut Nyak Dhien
- Cut Nyak Meutia
- Teuku Umar
- Teuku Muhammad Hasan
- Malahayati

== Politicians ==
- Abdoe'lxarim M. S. (1901–60) former Communist Party notable and Boven-Digoel internee
- Azwar Abubakar, former governor of Aceh, former Minister for Administrative Reform
- Hasballah M. Saad, former Minister of Law and Human Rights
- Irwandi Yusuf, former governor of Aceh (2007–2012)
- Jusman Syafii Djamal, former Minister of Transportation
- Muhammad Nazar, former vice governor of Aceh (2007–2012)
- Mustafa Abubakar, former acting governor of Aceh (2006), former state minister of state enterprises
- Tengku Adnan Tengku Mansor, current Malaysian Minister of the Federal Territories and former minister of Tourism (2006–2008)
- Zaini Abdullah, current governor of Aceh

== See also ==
- Acehnese people
- List of Batak people
- List of Bugis people
- List of Chinese Indonesians
- List of Javanese people
- List of Minangkabaus
- List of Moluccan people
- List of Sundanese people
