= Sayuti Abubakar =

Indonesian politician (born 1981)

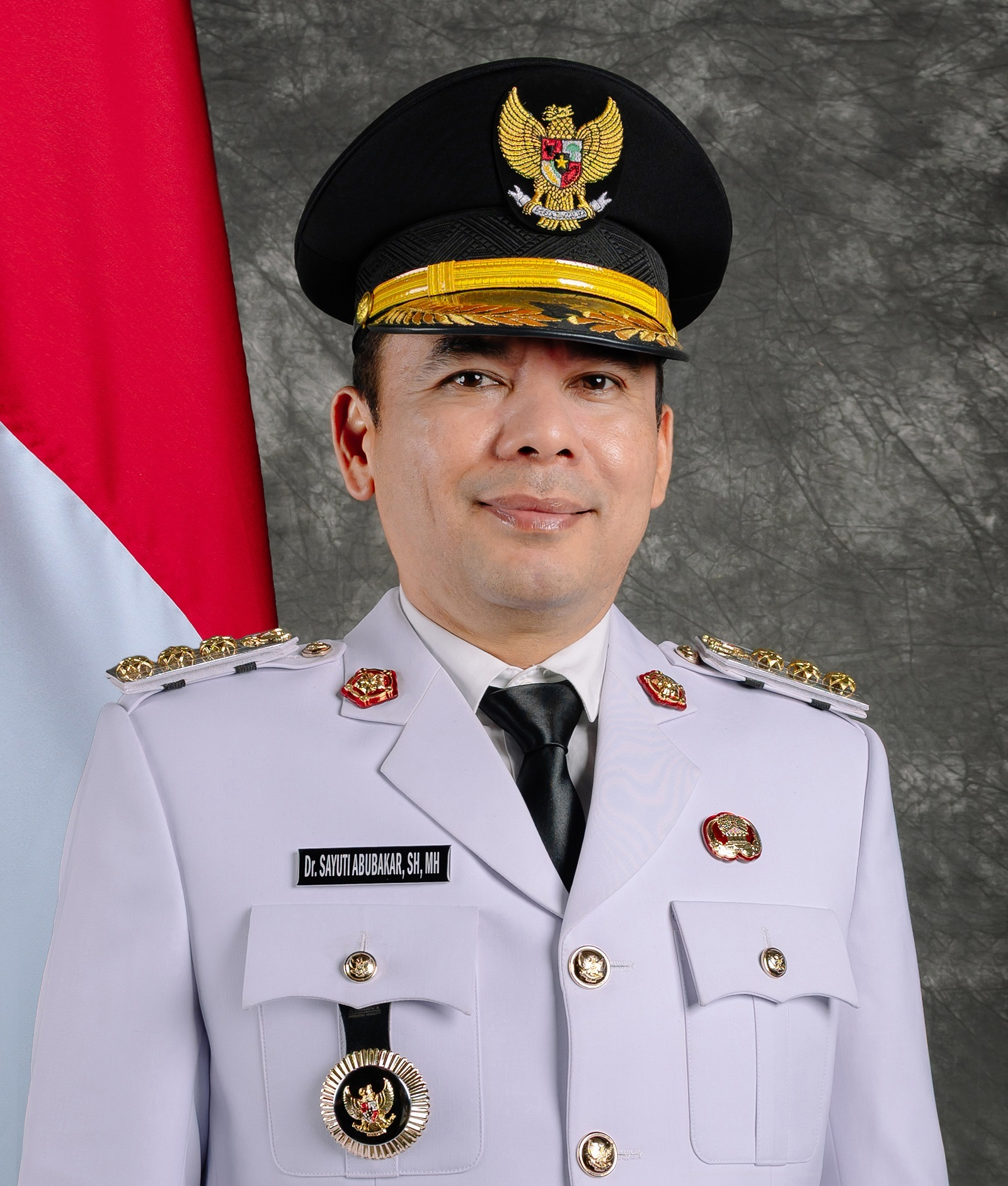

Mayor of Lhokseumawe
- Incumbent
- Assumed office 17 February 2025
- Preceded by: Tengku Suaidi Yahya

Personal details
- Born: 15 September 1981 (age 44) Peusangan, North Aceh, Indonesia
- Party: Nanggroe Aceh Party
- Education: Pancasila University; Trisakti University

Sayuti Abubakar (born 15 September 1981) is an Indonesian politician and lawyer who is the mayor of Lhokseumawe, Aceh, serving since February 2025. During his legal career, he represented two-time Acehnese governor Irwandi Yusuf in electoral disputes, and joined his political party the Nanggroe Aceh Party.

== Early life ==
Sayuti Abubakar was born in the Gampong of Linggong, in Peusangan district of North Aceh Regency (today Bireuën Regency), on 15 September 1981. His parents were Abubakar and Saudah. He studied at a state-funded madrasa in Peusangan, and continued his studies in Lhokseumawe (then capital of North Aceh) where he graduated from a pesantren school in 1996. He then moved to Bekasi in West Java for high school, completing it in 1999. He then studied law at Pancasila University, receiving his bachelor's in 2003. He married Yulinda Sayuti.

== Career ==
=== Legal ===
Abubakar began to work at a law firm in Jakarta after receiving his bachelor's. In 2006, he left the firm to establish his own practice. In 2015, he received a master's degree in law from Pancasila, and in 2024 he received a doctorate from Trisakti University.

Abubakar's clients as a lawyer included a number of regional leaders, one of which was Acehnese politician and two-time governor Irwandi Yusuf. Abubakar represented Yusuf in a dispute related to the 2012 Aceh gubernatorial election at the Constitutional Court (MK), where Yusuf's lawsuit failed and his opponent Zaini Abdullah's election as governor was upheld. He again represented Yusuf after the 2017 Aceh gubernatorial election, and the MK sided with Yusuf in the dispute to uphold his victory in the election. Abubakar had also previously represented Yusuf in 2011 (related to an election delay) and the Aceh Sovereignty Party in 2009.

=== Politics ===
When Yusuf updated the name and leadership of his founded political party the National Aceh Party into the Nanggroe Aceh Party (PNA) in 2017, Abubakar became a member of the party's supreme council as secretary. In 2019, following Yusuf's arrest by the Corruption Eradication Commission, PNA held an extraordinary congress to elect a new chairman, but Abubakar refused to recognize the congress' legitimacy. The Ministry of Law and Human Rights ultimately did not recognize the new leadership, and Yusuf remained chairman of the party even as he was in jail. While in prison, Irwandi signed a nomination letter as PNA chairman in March 2021, endorsing Abubakar to become the new vice governor (the previous vice governor, Nova Iriansyah, replaced him). His recommendation was rejected by some PNA leaders and other coalition parties, and the position of Aceh's vice governor remained vacant until the end of Nova's term in 2022.

In 2024, Abubakar registered to run as mayor of Lhokseumawe, receiving support from PNA, the Aceh Party, PKB, Demokrat, and PPP. Husaini Pom, a former Free Aceh Movement fighter and Aceh Party member, became his running mate. They were elected with 34,962 votes (38.2%) in a four-way race. They were sworn in on 17 February 2025.
