= Din Minimi =

Indonesian former militant

- Born: Nurdin bin Ismail Amat; 10 August 1979 (age 46); East Aceh, Indonesia
- Known for: Leading a post-GAM armed group

Nurdin bin Ismail Amat (born 10 August 1979), better known as Din Minimi, is a former militant of Free Aceh Movement who led an armed band based in Aceh during the 2010s.

Born in East Aceh, he joined the separatist movement in 1997. Following the peace process in Aceh, Minimi spent some time working various jobs before leading a band of armed criminals, disillusioned by the new Acehnese provincial government. In October 2014, he openly declared his stance, and, following the deaths of two Indonesian Army personnel, engaged in conflict with both the Indonesian Police and Army.

In late 2015, Minimi agreed to surrender to the central government in exchange for an amnesty. The granting of the amnesty produced some controversy, and as of 2018, the amnesty has not been formally granted.

== Biography ==
=== Early life and GAM ===
Nurdin bin Ismail Amat was born on 10 August 1979 in Keude Buloh village, Julok district, East Aceh Regency. His father, who was killed before the fall of Suharto, fought for the Free Aceh Movement (GAM), and Nurdin received his nickname Minimi – from the machine gun FN Minimi – from him. Minimi, the eldest of four brothers, dropped out from formal education at third grade, joining the separatist movement in 1997.

While being part of the movement, Minimi married his wife in 2000. The couple has three children.

In GAM, Minimi was part of its unit around Perlak in East Aceh Regency. Minimi was arrested by the Indonesian Army in 2003 and was imprisoned for a year in Langsa. The conflict killed one of his brothers in 2004 and another one went missing.

=== Post-GAM ===
After the peace deal between GAM and Indonesian government, Minimi initially worked as a forklift operator in a lumber processing factory owned by a former GAM commander. The factory later closed due to a lack of raw materials, and after a brief stint as a heavy equipment operator Minimi then worked for his friend Adi Maros, a fellow former militant, in a drainage construction project in East Aceh as a bulldozer operator. When the project concluded, Maros remarked that the two remained in contact through their phones.

During the 2012 gubernatorial elections, Minimi came into dispute with members of the Aceh Transitory Committee – a body following the peace deal to normalize the situation in Aceh. The committee's members had endorsed former GAM leader Zaini Abdullah for the election while Minimi – despite initially following the position – endorsed former vice governor Muhammad Nazar. Following the dispute, Minimi went away from public view.

Minimi proceeded to lead a band of armed men in East Aceh, conducting robberies and kidnappings, including kidnapping a Scottish oil worker in 2013, destroying ballot boxes for the 2014 election and attacking trucks carrying palm oil fruit. Often, Minimi's supporters would claim that the proceeds from the activities were used to help the poor in a Robin Hood-like manner, although later testimonies revealed that the money was distributed among the group.

Around late 2014, two separate factions of Acehnese separatists – one based in Aceh, the other in Norway – contacted Minimi and helped his group with funding and personnel. In October 2014, Minimi reappeared into public view, and issued a declaration that the band was fighting against the incumbent provincial government led by Zaini Abdullah and Muzakir Manaf. He issued the declaration through local media, inviting journalists and had photos of him carrying AK-47 taken. The declaration also included admissions of the group's criminal actions and his primary grievances – namely, poor living conditions of former GAM militants. He further added that he was fighting against the Acehnese government and not the central Indonesian government, and was not seeking Acehnese independence.

In March 2015, two Indonesian Army intelligence personnel were kidnapped and killed in North Aceh while the pair was tracking Minimi's group. Minimi's group – although Minimi initially denied that his men conducted the killings – was then hunted, with Minimi himself being wanted dead or alive. The Indonesian Army and Police proceeded to engage in multiple armed contacts with Minimi's group throughout 2015 – two engagements in Pidie killed four militants during May, one in July, and another in August. By late October, Indonesian authorities claimed to have arrested 38 and killed 6, while still having 25 in manhunt.

The NGO Institute for Policy Analysis of Conflict wrote that the police and army were competing with different approaches to try and neutralize Minimi first.

=== Amnesty ===
Following a conversation with the military commander of Kodam Iskandar Muda who guaranteed his safety, Minimi briefly returned home that month, but was forced to escape when the local police district chief showed up there. By June 2015, the local military district commander had visited Minimi's home, called for his surrender to the authorities, and again guaranteed his safety. The Kodam Iskandar Muda commander Major General Agus Kriswanto also engaged in phone conversations with Minimi.

In late December 2015, Minimi was visited by Indonesian State Intelligence Agency chief Sutiyoso, eventually agreeing to lay down his arms following negotiations. Contact between the two were facilitated by Finnish negotiator Juha Christensen – who had played a significant role in the 2005 peace process. According to Minimi, he spoke to Indonesian President Joko Widodo during the negotiations through Sutiyoso's phone. Aside from amnesty for the members of the group, Minimi also demanded that the Corruption Eradication Commission actively monitor Acehnese governance.

Minimi's amnesty received opposition from multiple parties, including lawmakers from Commission I of People's Representative Council who remarked that Minimi's group was an ordinary criminal group, not a separatist one, and hence is not eligible for amnesty. Police chief Badrodin Haiti noted that the police would still legally process the group, although he noted that leniency would be considered. Widodo himself ascertained that an amnesty would be granted. In addition to the controversies, some legal disputes occurred over the details of the amnesty – mainly, whether the militants had to undergo the legal process first or if the process should be waived altogether. The responsible commission of DPR issued its stance as the former.

In July 2016, Politics, Law and Security Coordinating Minister Luhut Pandjaitan stated that 70 members of Minimi's group would receive amnesty. As of March 2018, Minimi and his group has not yet been granted amnesty – with at least two members still imprisoned.

Despite not having been officially pardoned, Minimi joined Pancasila Youth in April 2016. In an incident that month, a man Minimi's group kidnapped in 2013 assaulted him by punching him in the face when the two coincidentally met after watching a football match. When the Corruption Eradication Commission arrested Acehnese governor Irwandi Yusuf and the regent of Bener Meriah Regency Ahmadi in 2018, Minimi expressed his support.

== Family ==
Minimi is married to Herlinawati, and as of 2020 had three children. His eldest son was accepted in the non-commissioned officer candidate school (Secaba) in the Indonesian Army in 2020.
