= 2024 Aceh gubernatorial election =

- 27 November 2024
- Registered: 3,764,944
- Turnout: 77.77% (▼21.67pp)
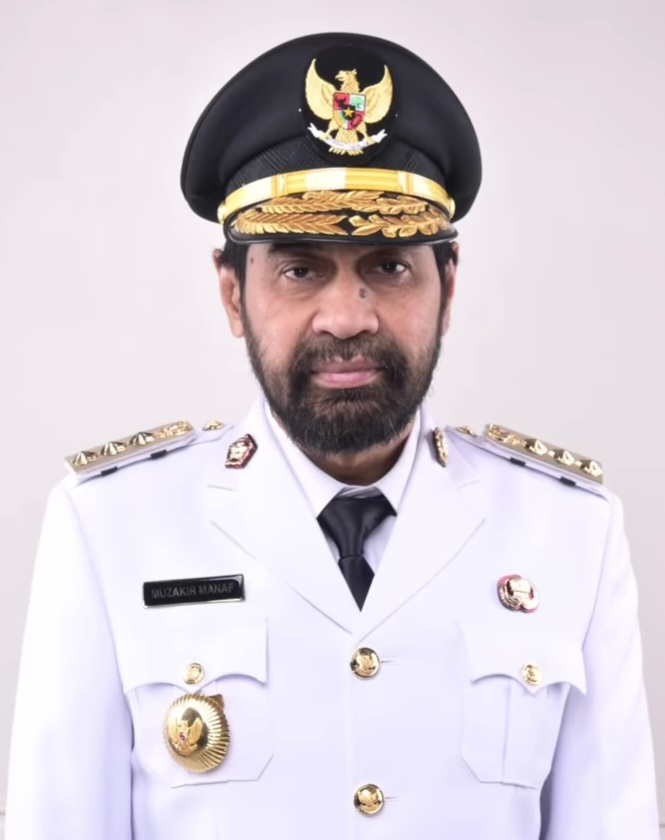

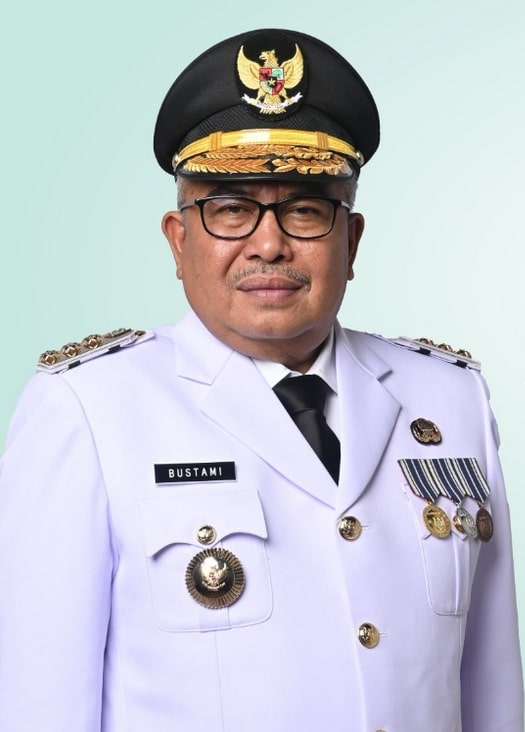
| Candidate | Muzakir Manaf | Bustami Hamzah |
| Party | PA | NasDem |
| Alliance | KIM Plus | – |
| Running mate | Fadhlullah | Fadhil Rahmi |
| Popular vote | 1,492,846 | 1,309,375 |
| Percentage | 53.27% | 46.73% |
- Results map by district
Governor before election
Safrizal Zakaria Ali (acting)
Independent
Elected Governor
Muzakir Manaf
PA

The 2024 Acehnese gubernatorial election was held on 27 November 2024 as part of nationwide local elections to elect the governor of Aceh for a five-year term. The previous election was held in 2017. The election was won by former Vice Governor Muzakir Manaf of the Aceh Party with 53% of the vote. His sole opponent, Bustami Hamzah of NasDem, received 46%.

== Electoral system ==
The election, like other local elections in 2024, follow the first-past-the-post system where the candidate with the most votes wins the election, even if they do not win a majority. It is possible for a candidate to run uncontested, in which case the candidate is still required to win a majority of votes "against" an "empty box" option. Should the candidate fail to do so, the election will be repeated on a later date.

== Candidates ==
According to electoral regulations, in order to qualify for the election, candidates are required to secure support from a political party or a coalition of parties controlling 13 seats (15 percent) in the Aceh House of Representatives (DPRA). Notably, this was lower than the national standard of 20 percent of seats. The Aceh Party (PA), which won 20 seats in the 2024 legislative election, is the only party eligible to nominate its own candidates without forming a coalition with other parties. Candidates may alternatively demonstrate support to run as an independent in form of photocopies of identity cards, which in Aceh's case corresponds to 165,476 copies. While one candidate registered with the Acehnese Independent Elections Commission (KIP), they did not fulfill the criteria, making the 2024 election the first Acehnese gubernatorial election to not include an independent candidate.

The previously elected governor, Irwandi Yusuf, was arrested by the Corruption Eradication Commission in 2019.

=== Declared ===
The following are individuals who have been declared by a political party as endorsed candidates:

Candidate from NasDem Party
| Bustami Hamzah | Fadhil Rahmi |
| for Governor | for Vice Governor |
| Acting Governor of Aceh (2022–2024) | Indonesian Senator for Aceh (2019–2024) |
Parties
28 / 81(35%)
NasDem Party (10 seats); Golkar (9 seats); PAN (5 seats); PAS Aceh (3 seats); PDA (1 seat)

Former provincial secretary and incumbent acting governor of Aceh, Bustami Hamzah, received the endorsement of the NasDem Party, the second-largest party in the DPRD. Hamzah initially registered with Muhammad Yusuf A. Wahab ("Tu Sop") as running mate, but Tu Sop died shortly after and was replaced as the vice-gubernatorial candidate by 2019–2024 Indonesian Senator Fadhil Rahmi. KIP initially declared the ticket to be unqualified to run in the election (due to a failure to explicitly state their willingness to follow the 2005 Helsinki Agreement, a requirement under prior Acehnese electoral laws), but they were cleared to run on 22 September.

Candidate from Aceh Party and Gerindra
| Muzakir Manaf | Fadhlullah |
| for Governor | for Vice Governor |
| Vice Governor of Aceh (2012–2017) | Member of DPR RI from Gerindra (2019–2024) |
Parties
53 / 81(65%)
Aceh Party (20 seats); PKB (9 seats); Demokrat (7 seats); Gerindra (6 seats); PPP (5 seats); PKS (4 seats); PNA (1 seat); PDIP (1 seat); PSI

=== Potential ===
The following are individuals who had either been publicly mentioned as a potential candidate by a political party in the DPRD, publicly declared their candidacy with press coverage, or considered as a potential candidate for Governor and Vice Governor by media outlets, but eventually did not run:

- Mawardi Ali (PAN), former regent of Aceh Besar (2017–2022).
- Muhammad Nasir Djamil (PKS), member House of Representatives for Aceh II (2019– ).
- Muhammad Nazar (SIRA), former vice governor of Aceh (2007–2012).
- Ruslan M. Daud (PKB), member of House of Representatives for Aceh II (2019– ) and former regent of Bireuën (2012–2017).

== Political map ==
Following the 2024 Indonesian legislative election, thirteen political parties are represented in the DPRA:

| Political parties | Seat count |
|---|---|
| Aceh Party | 20 / 81 |
| NasDem Party | 10 / 81 |
| Party of Functional Groups (Golkar) | 9 / 81 |
| National Awakening Party (PKB) | 9 / 81 |
| Democratic Party (Demokrat) | 7 / 81 |
| Great Indonesia Movement Party (Gerindra) | 5 / 81 |
| National Mandate Party (PAN) | 5 / 81 |
| United Development Party (PPP) | 5 / 81 |
| Prosperous Justice Party (PKS) | 4 / 81 |
| Aceh Just and Prosperous Party (PAS Aceh) | 4 / 81 |
| Indonesian Democratic Party of Struggle (PDI-P) | 1 / 81 |
| Aceh Nanggroe Party (PNA) | 1 / 81 |
| Aceh Abode Party (PDA) | 1 / 81 |

== Results ==
| Candidate | Running mate | Party | Votes | % |
|---|---|---|---|---|
| Muzakir Manaf | Fadhlullah | Aceh Party | 1,492,846 | 53.27 |
| Bustami Hamzah | Fadhil Rahmi | NasDem Party | 1,309,375 | 46.73 |
| Total | | | 2,802,221 | 100.00 |
| Valid votes | | | 2,802,221 | 95.71 |
| Invalid/blank votes | | | 125,593 | 4.29 |
| Total votes | | | 2,927,814 | 100.00 |
| Registered voters/turnout | | | 3,764,944 | 77.77 |
Source: KPU
