= Islamic criminal law in Aceh =

Location of Aceh (red) in Indonesia

The province of Aceh in Indonesia enforces some provisions of Islamic criminal law, the sole Indonesian province to do so. In Aceh, Islamic criminal law is called jinayat (an Arabic loanword). The laws that implement it are called Qanun Jinayat or Hukum Jinayat, roughly meaning "Islamic criminal code". (Note: Sometimes media sources refer to these laws as the "Sharia" (Islamic law), but the vast majority of instances of the application of Islamic law in Aceh involved civil cases (e.g. divorce and inheritance), with criminal cases forming only a small subset. See Cammack & Feener 2012, p. 42 and Mahkamah Syar'iyah Aceh 2017, pp. 34–36) Although the largely-secular laws of Indonesia apply in Aceh, the provincial government passed additional regulations, some derived from Islamic criminal law, after Indonesia authorized the province to enact regional regulations and granted Aceh special autonomy to implement Islamic law. Offences under the provisions include alcohol consumption, production and distribution, gambling, adultery, rape, sexual harassment, certain intimacies outside marriage, and certain homosexual acts. Punishments include caning, fines, and imprisonment. There is no provision for stoning; an attempt to introduce it in 2009 was vetoed by Governor Irwandi Yusuf. In 2016 Aceh processed 324 first instance court cases under Islamic criminal law, and carried out at least 100 caning sentences.

Supporters of Islamic criminal law defend its legality under the special autonomy granted to Aceh. Critics, including Amnesty International, object to the use of caning as a punishment, as well as the criminalization of consensual sex outside marriage.

== Background ==
=== Special autonomy of Aceh ===
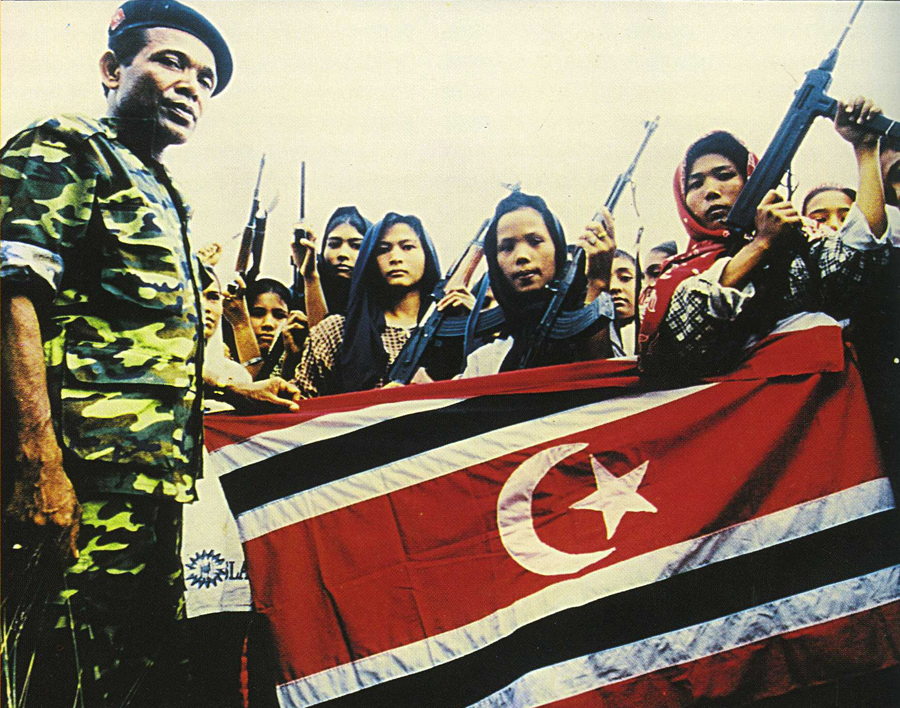
Soldiers of the now-defunct Free Aceh Movement (date unknown, photo published in 1999). The insurgency in Aceh led to a peace treaty and special autonomy in Aceh.

Aceh is the westernmost province of Indonesia, with a population of 4.49 million according to the 2010 census (roughly 1.8% of Indonesia's total population). It differs from other regions of Indonesia due to its distinct political, religious, and ethnic identity, formed during the time of the indigenous pre-colonial states such as the Aceh Sultanate. Muslims in Aceh are generally more religious than those in other parts of Indonesia, and are proud of their Islamic heritage, earning the province the nickname of "Verandah of Mecca" (Indonesian: serambi Mekkah). More than 98% of Aceh's population identify as Muslim.

As part of the post-Suharto reforms, Indonesia granted more power to local governments. This decentralization of power was largely governed by two laws passed in 1999 and 2004. These laws authorized the local governments and legislatures to pass regional regulations (peraturan daerah or perda) that carry the force of law, as long as they do not conflict with laws or regulations that are higher in the hierarchy of laws. Aceh's regional regulations are known as qanun (from an Arabic word meaning "law" or "rules").

In addition to this, Aceh was given special autonomy, partly in response to the 1976–2005 insurgency in the province. Indonesian Law No. 18 of 2001 on Special Autonomy in Aceh granted broader powers to the province, including the authority to formally implement Islamic law. Law No. 11 of 2006 on the Administration of Aceh explicitly made implementation of Islamic law the legal duty of the government of Aceh.

=== Status of Islamic law in Indonesia ===
At the national level, there are three systems of law in operation in Indonesia: civil law, commercial law, and criminal law. Outside Aceh, the influence of Islamic law is limited to civil law in the areas of marriage, inheritance, and religious endowments (Indonesian: waqaf), and to commercial law in certain areas of Islamic banking and finance. Other sources of civil and commercial law include European codes and customary tradition (Indonesian: adat). The criminal code (Indonesian: Kitab Undang-undang Hukum Pidana, KUHP, the "Criminal Law Code") is largely based on the Netherlands Indies Criminal Code imposed by the Netherlands, which ruled Indonesia before 1945, with certain amendments promulgated by the Republic of Indonesia after independence. Aceh is the only province of Indonesia that enforces Islamic law in criminal matters.

== Legal status ==
Provisions of Islamic law specific to Aceh are promulgated through qanuns, which have the legal status of perda (regional regulation). Their legal basis include Law No. 11 of 2006, which mandated Islamic law in Aceh. A qanun requires approval from both the Aceh House of Representatives (Indonesian: Dewan Perwakilan Rakyat Aceh, DPRA) and the governor to become law. While the largely secular Indonesian national law still applies in Aceh, the qanuns cover offences not defined in the national law, and in some cases define a different punishment. The qanuns are subordinate to the Indonesian constitution and national laws, and are subject to judicial review in the Supreme Court or the Constitutional Court. This means that there must be no qanuns or Islamic sharia law in Aceh that conflicts with or overrides the Indonesian national law. This legal structure also means that not all provisions of Islamic law apply in Aceh, but only the specific elements of it which have been legislated. It also means that legislation is carried out by the elected parliament and governor, not the ulema (Islamic scholars).

== Legislative history ==
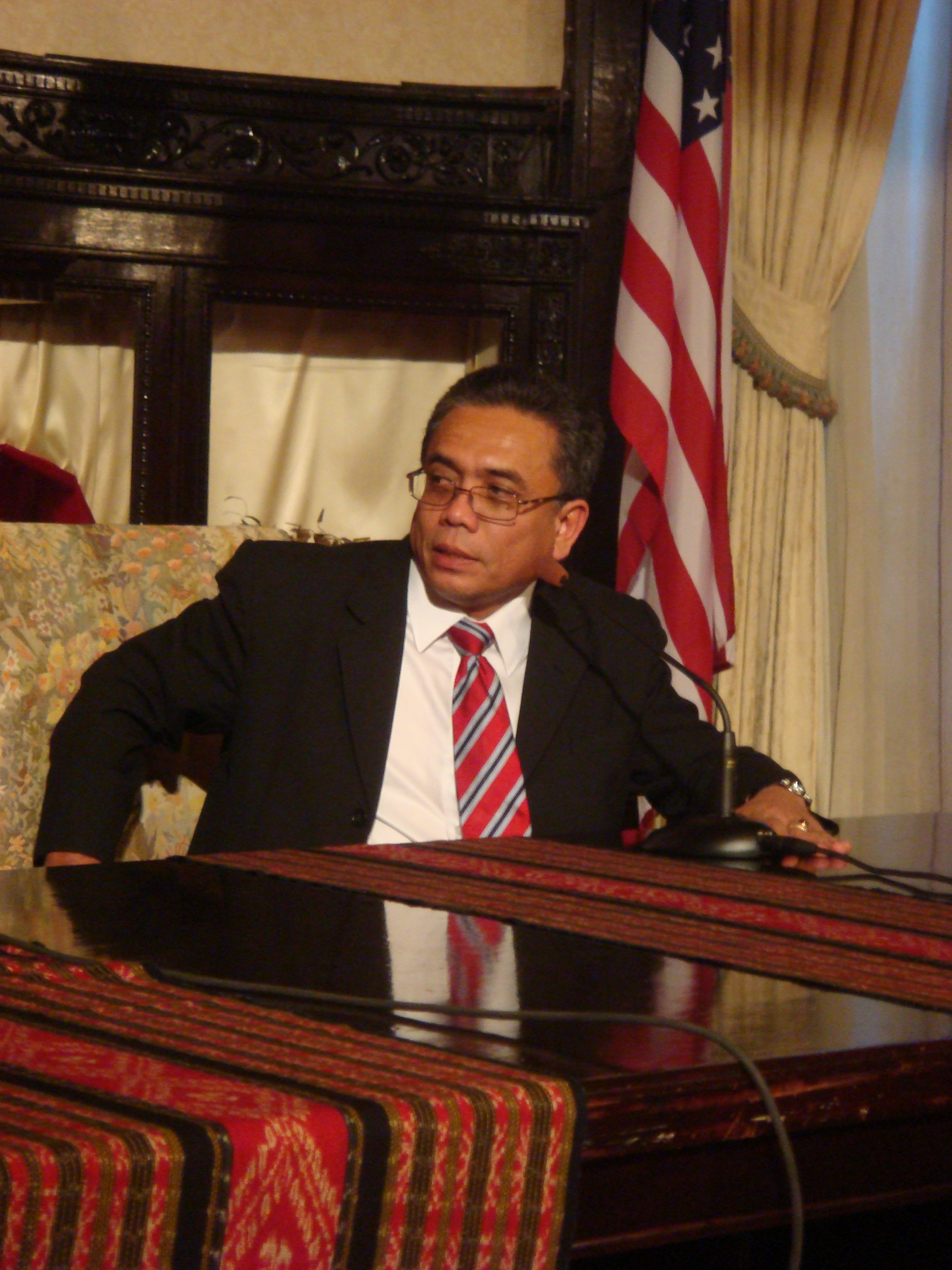
Governor Irwandi Yusuf (in office 2007–2012) vetoed a 2009 qanun which would have introduced stoning.

Institution of Islamic criminal law in Aceh began with Qanun No. 11 of 2002, which was largely symbolic. In 2003 further laws were passed: Qanuns No. 12, which dealt with the consumption of alcohol, No. 13, on gambling, and No. 14, on khalwat (being alone with someone of the opposite sex who is not a spouse or a relative). In 2009 the parliament of Aceh approved a new qanun that expanded the implementation of Islamic criminal law, but the governor at the time, Irwandi Yusuf, refused to sign the qanun into law, openly declaring his opposition to the provision of stoning (rajm) in the Qanun. The law required approval from both the legislature and the governor, so it did not go into effect. On 27 September 2014 the parliament of Aceh passed Qanun No. 6, which revised the rejected 2009 qanun and removed the provision of stoning. Governor Zaini Abdullah signed it into law on 23 October 2014, and it went into effect one year later on 23 October 2015, as stipulated by the qanun. Compared to the 2003 qanuns that it replaced, Qanun No. 6 increased the number of offences punishable under Islamic law as well as the severity of punishment. Under the 2003 laws, the maximum number of caning strokes was set at 40, and in practice it rarely exceeded 12, but the 2014 law set the minimum number of strokes at 10 and the maximum at 150.

In March 2018, Aceh's sharia and human rights bureau started conducting research and consulting public opinion for the introduction of capital punishment, specifically beheading, as punishment for severe crimes such as murder. Although Indonesia has the death penalty, the central government warned that Aceh's plan to usher in beheading as a punishment for murder was banned under existing national laws. Aceh's provincial government then apologized, stating that the latter was an individual's opinion and the provincial government have no plans to introduce death penalty in the future.

Since April 2018, the governor of Aceh Irwandi Yusuf stated that caning violators of Islamic law must no longer be carried out in public places. Executions are carried out in designated correctional institutions. According to Irwandi, this policy is in accordance with Aceh Governor Regulation Number 5 of 2018 concerning the implementation of the Jinayat Procedure Law which is carried out in governmental institutions, state prisons, or branches of the Aceh regional state prison. Children under the age of 18 are prohibited from watching.

In 2024, it is reported that the sharia law and caning laws in Aceh province only applies to Muslims according to the Head of the Regional Office of the Ministry of Religious Affairs of the Aceh Province. Several years before that, Non-Muslim Indonesians can choose whether to follow sharia law and national law, but from now the Aceh’s sharia law caning only applies to Muslims and not Non-Muslims. However, Non-Muslim Indonesian violators of sharia law in Aceh could be subject to administrative sanctions or fines, not caning. Non-Muslims are also exempted from certain things that are allowed by their religion, though sometimes they would have to do it in private. The Aceh provincial office in Jakarta also stated that foreign citizens (both Muslims and Non-Muslims) are exempt from sharia law.

== Provisions ==
Qanun Aceh No. 6 of 2014 (known as the Qanun Jinayat) is the latest revision of Islamic criminal law implementation in Aceh. It criminalizes the consumption and production of liquor (called khamar in the law), gambling (maisir), being alone with someone of the opposite sex who is not a spouse or a relative (khalwat), committing intimacy outside marriage (ikhtilath), adultery (zina), sexual abuse (pelecehan seksual), rape (pemerkosaan), falsely accusing someone of adultery (qadzaf), sodomy between males (liwath), and lesbian acts (musahaqah).

The penalty for violation of these laws includes caning, fines, and imprisonment. The severity of the sentence varies. Khalwat offences have the lightest sentence, and may include caning (maximum 10 strokes), 10 months' imprisonment, or a fine of 100 gold grams. The heaviest sentence is imposed on perpetrators of child rape; the sentence may be caning (150–200 strokes), imprisonment (150–200 months), or a fine (1,500–2,000 gold grams). Judges of individual cases have the discretion of imposing caning, imprisonment, or a fine. According to Amnesty International, there were 108 cases of caning carried out under the Qanun in 2015, and 100 in 2016 up to October.

The law is applicable to all offences committed by Muslims or legal entities in Aceh. It also applies to offences committed by non-Muslims if the offences are not regulated in the Indonesian Criminal Code, or if committed together with a Muslim and the non-Muslim voluntarily chooses Islamic law. In April 2016, a Christian woman was caned 28 times for selling alcohol – the first non-Muslim to receive caning under the law.

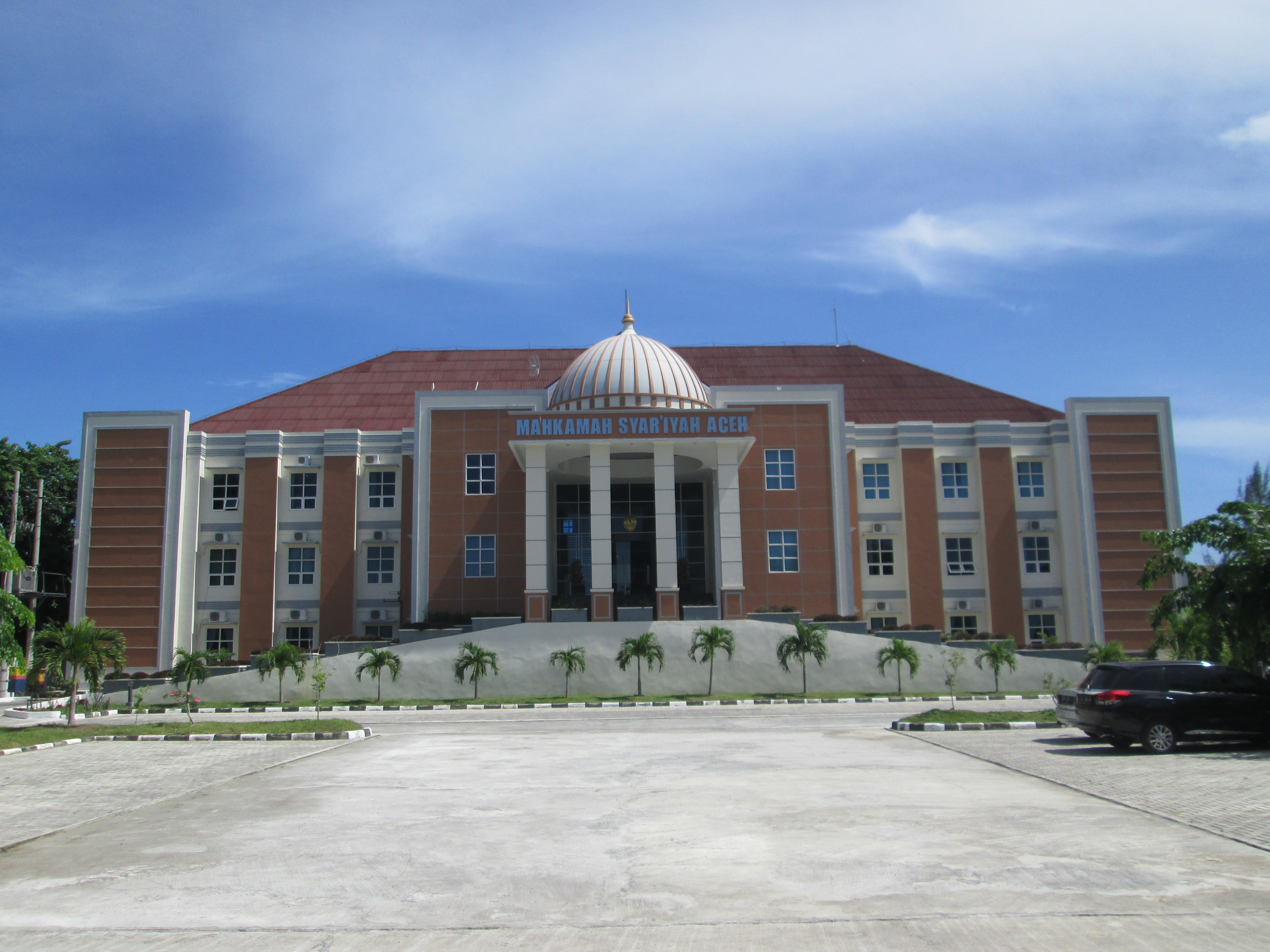
The Aceh Sharia courts (Mahkamah Syar'iyah Aceh), which hear both civil and criminal cases involving Islamic law

Major institutions relevant to the implementation of Islamic criminal law in Aceh include the ulama council (Indonesian: Majelis Permusyawaratan Ulama, MPU), the Wilayatul Hisbah (WH, sometimes referred to in English as the "Sharia police"), and the sharia courts (Indonesian: Mahkamah Syar'iyah). The ulema council is composed of both the ulama and "Muslim intellectuals", and on paper is expected to be involved in creating policies together with the government in regencies/cities. However, it has not been able to exercise these powers, and in reality legislation is done by the Parliament of Aceh and the governor's office. The Wilayatul Hisbah has the authority to reprimand and give advice to those caught violating the Islamic law. It does not have the authority to formally charge or detain suspects, and thus must work together with the regular police and prosecutors in order to enforce the law. The sharia courts hear and rule on both civil cases under Islamic law (such as divorce and inheritance) and criminal law under the qanuns. However, civil cases continue to be the vast majority of cases heard by the court. In 2016, the courts received 10,888 first instance civil cases and 131 appeals, compared to 324 first instance criminal cases and 15 appeals. The sharia courts are part of the broader Indonesian legal system. Their decisions can be appealed to the Supreme Court, and their judges (including the chief judge) are appointed by the Supreme Court.

== Judicial review ==
A judicial review before the Indonesian Supreme Court was brought against the 2014 Qanun by the Institute for Criminal Justice Reform in 2015. The petitioner argued that the Qanun was not in line with superior laws, namely the national Criminal Code, as the code did not include caning in its exhaustive list of allowed punishments; the 1999 Human Rights Law and the International Covenant on Civil and Political Rights, since caning is considered to be a form of torture or cruel, inhuman and degrading treatment under these instruments; and also the Criminal Procedure Code for the reason that the code requires police to provide evidence for crimes, not the victims, and oath before God is not regarded as a valid form of evidence. Furthermore, the petitioner asserted that the Qanun was contrary to "hierarchy of laws" clause under Article 7(1) of the Law-making Law. It further argued that the Qanun violated Article 6(1)(i) of the 2011 Law-making Law, as the Qanun was deemed to be a duplicate of national laws and thus was compromising legal order and certainty. However, because at the time of the appeal the Indonesian Constitutional Court was reviewing a challenge against the said Article 7(1), the Court dismissed the appeal by invoking Article 55 of the Constitutional Court Law. This decision was criticized by expert of Indonesian law Simon Butt, as the Supreme Court could have proceeded with the case by considering the claim that the Qanun is contrary to other higher-level laws.

== Reactions ==
Amnesty International said that they are "seriously concerned" about the implementation of the law and called for the repeal of some of its provisions. It said that caning can amount to torture and contravenes the Constitution of Indonesia and international human rights law, and can cause long-term physical and mental injuries. Additionally, it objected to the criminalization of consensual sexual relationships outside marriage, on the grounds that they violate the right to privacy. Indonesian women's rights organization Solidaritas Perempuan said that the provisions are biased against women, and that the high standard of proof required for rape convictions means that many rapists are acquitted.

Legal scholar Hamdani of Aceh's Malikussaleh University said that the people of Aceh have the right to enact Islamic law as freedom of religion and defended its legality based on Indonesian laws granting Aceh authority to enact Islamic law. Deputy head of the Aceh Islamic Sharia Agency Munawar Jalil rejected criticism that provisions of the law violated human rights or existing laws in Indonesia and Aceh, and invited critics to file a judicial review if they believe otherwise.
