= Nova Iriansyah =

Indonesian architect and politician

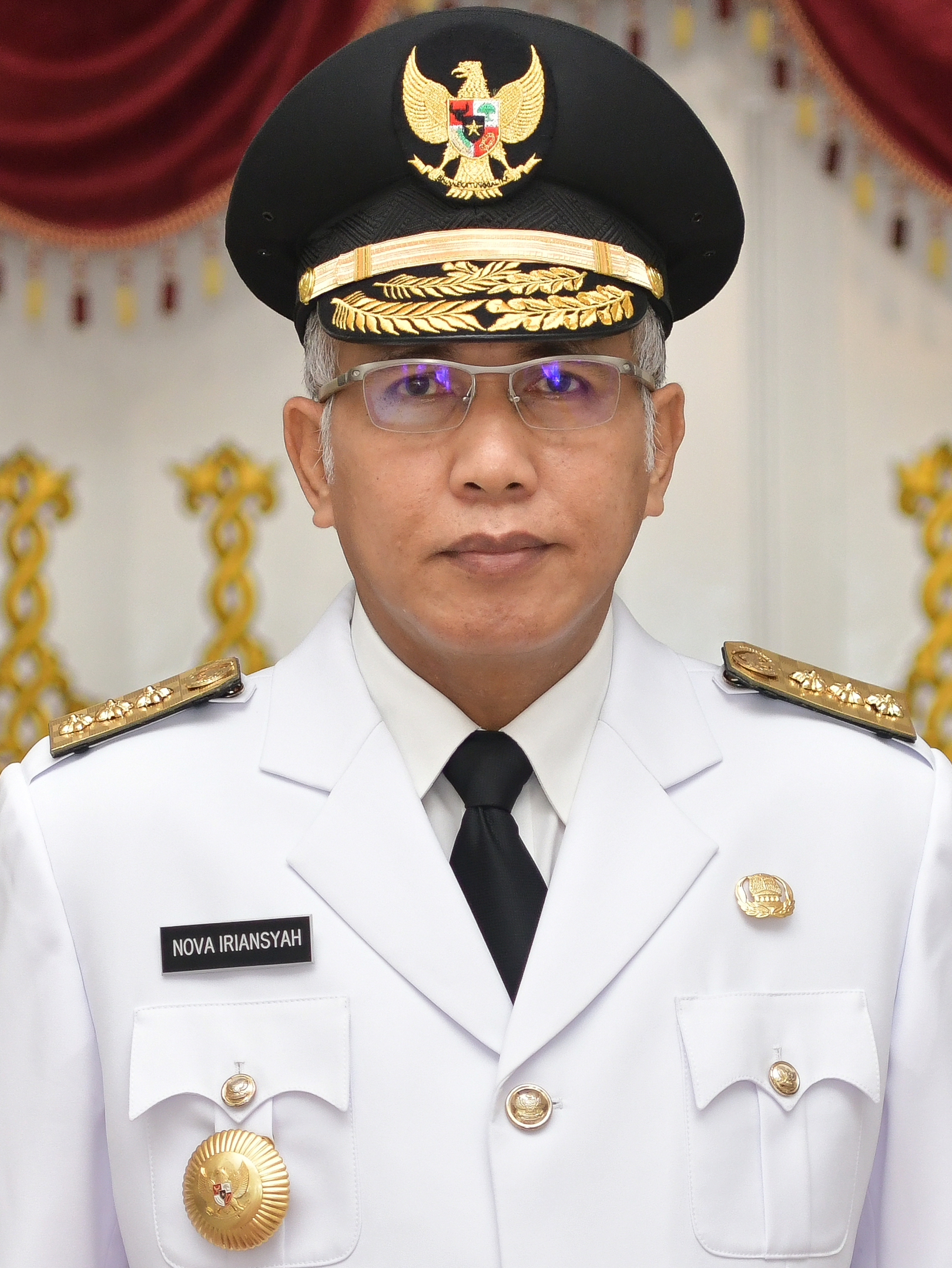

Governor of Aceh
- In office 5 November 2020 – 5 July 2022
- Preceded by: Irwandi Yusuf
- Succeeded by: Achmad Marzuki (acting)

Vice Governor of Aceh
- In office 5 July 2017 – 5 November 2020
- Preceded by: Muzakir Manaf

Member of People's Representative Council
- In office 1 October 2009 – 1 October 2014

Personal details
- Born: 22 November 1963 (age 61); Banda Aceh, Aceh, Indonesia
- Political party: Democratic

Nova Iriansyah (born 22 November 1963) is an Indonesian architect and politician who has served as the Governor of Aceh, Indonesia since 2020, although he had served as acting governor since 2018. Before becoming governor, he was deputy governor in 2017–2018, and served in the People's Representative Council between 2009 and 2014.

== Early life and education ==
Iriansyah was born in Banda Aceh on 22 November 1963. Initially, he studied at Banda Aceh, before his family moved to Takengon for a time. During his elementary school at Takengon, Iriansyah was expelled from school, and had to move to another school in the town. His middle and high school studies were in Banda Aceh. He then studied architecture at university, graduating with a bachelor's degree from the Sepuluh Nopember Institute of Technology in 1988 and later obtaining a master's degree from the Bandung Institute of Technology in 1998.

== Career ==
After graduating, he taught architecture at Syiah Kuala University, and became department head between 2004 and 2006 until he resigned to take part in politics as he was elected the provincial chairman of the Democratic Party. At the time of his resignation, he had taught architecture for 19 years, his academic career preceding Syiah Kuala's department of architecture which was formed in 1997. Aside from lecturing, Iriansyah also formed an architecture consultancy to supplement his low salary. Between 2004 and 2008, he became head of the provincial branch of Institute of Development of Construction Services, which managed construction companies and contractors in the period of reconstruction after the 2004 tsunami.

Following the 2009 election, Iriansyah was elected as a member of the People's Representative Council as a member of the Democratic Party, representing Aceh's 1st electoral district. He ran as Muhammad Nazar's running mate in the 2012 Acehnese gubernatorial election, but was not elected. Iriansyah ran again as Irwandi Yusuf's running mate in the 2017 Aceh gubernatorial election and was elected, becoming vice governor on 5 July 2017. As Irwandi Yusuf was involved in a corruption case, he was removed from office and Nova was made acting governor on 9 July 2018. He was formally elevated to governor on 5 November 2020.
