= 2006 Aceh gubernatorial election =

- 11 December 2006
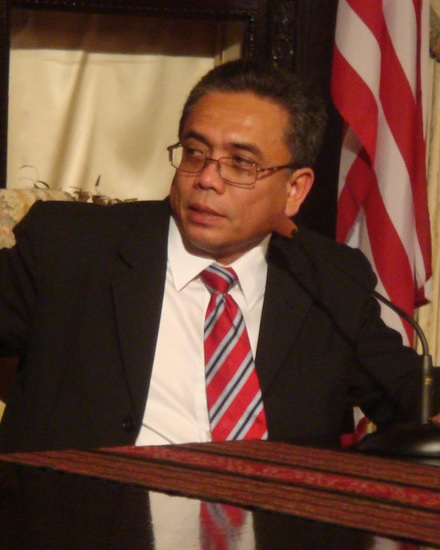

Nominee	Irwandi Yusuf	Humam Hamid	Abdul Malik Raden
Party	Independent	PPP	Golkar
Running mate	Muhammad Nazar	Hasbi Abdullah	Sayed Fuad Zakaria
Popular vote	768,745	334,484	281,174
Percentage	38.20%	16.62%	13.97%
Governor before election
Mustafa Abubakar (acting)
Elected Governor
Irwandi Yusuf
Independent

Regional elections were held in Aceh on 11 December 2006 after a peace agreement had been signed between the government of Indonesia and the Free Aceh Movement on 15 August 2005, ending the Insurgency in Aceh.

== Candidates ==
There were eight pairs of candidates for the governor and deputy governor posts:

1. Iskandar Hoesin and M. Saleh Manaf (PBB)
2. Lieutenant-General (ret.) Tamlicha Ali and Tengku Harmen Nuriqmar (PBR, PPNUI, and PKB)
3. Abdul Malik Raden and Sayed Fuad Zakaria (Golkar, PDI-P, and PKPI)
4. Humam Hamid and Hasbi Abdullah (PPP)
5. Djali Yusuf and R.A. Syauqas Rahmatillah (Independent)
6. Irwandi Yusuf and Muhammad Nazar (Independent, supported by much of the Free Aceh Movement)
7. Azwar Abubakar and Mohamad Nasir Djamil (PAN and PKS)
8. Ghazali Abas Adan and Salahuddin Alfata (Independent)

== Poll ==
A sample poll by the Indonesia Survey Institute showed former rebel leader Irwandi Yusuf leading on a turnout of 85%.

- Yusuf: 39%
- Hamid: 16%
- Malik Raden: 14%
- Abubakar: 11%
- Abas Adan: 7%
- Tamlicha: 4%

== Results ==
Final results were made public on 29 December 2006:

Candidate	Running mate	Party	Votes	%
Irwandi Yusuf	Muhammad Nazar	Independent	768,745	38.20
Humam Hamid	Hasbi Abdullah	United Development Party	334,484	16.62
Abdul Malik Raden	Sayed Fuad Zakaria	Golkar, Democratic Party of Struggle, Justice and Unity Party	281,174	13.97
Azwar Abubakar	Nasir Djamil	National Mandate Party, Prosperous Justice Party	213,566	10.61
Ghazali Abbas Adan	Salahuddin Alfata	Independent	156,978	7.80
Iskandar Hoesin	Saleh Manaf	Crescent Star Party	111,553	5.54
Tamlicha Ali	Harmen Nuriqmar	Reform Star Party, Nahdlatul Community Party, National Awakening Party	80,327	3.99
Djali Yusuf	Syauqas Rahmatillah	Independent	65,543	3.26
Total			2,012,370	100.00
Valid votes			2,012,370	92.69
Invalid/blank votes			158,643	7.31
Total votes			2,171,013	100.00

== Bibliography ==
- Ben Hillman, 'Aceh's Rebels Turn to Ruling', Far Eastern Economic Review, Vol. 170, No. 1, January–February 2007, 49–53.
