= Azwar Abubakar =

Administrative Reform Minister of Indonesia

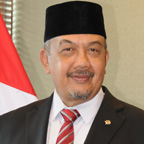
- Abubakar in 2011

15th Minister of State Apparatus Utilization and Bureaucratic Reform
- In office 19 October 2011 – 20 October 2014
- President: Susilo Bambang Yudhoyono
- Preceded by: E. E. Mangindaan
- Succeeded by: Yuddy Chrisnandi

Governor of Aceh Acting
- In office 19 July 2004 – 30 December 2005
- Preceded by: Abdullah Puteh
- Succeeded by: Mustafa Abubakar (Acting)

3rd Vice Governor of Aceh
- In office November 2000 – 19 July 2004
- Governor: Abdullah Puteh
- Preceded by: Bustari Mansyur
- Succeeded by: Muhammad Nazar (2007)

Personal details
- Born: 21 June 1952 (age 74) Banda Aceh, Indonesia
- Party: National Mandate Party
- Education: Bandung Institute of Technology; Syiah Kuala University

Hajji Azwar Abubakar (born 21 June 1952 in Banda Aceh) is an Indonesian politician who served as Minister of State Apparatus Utilization and Bureaucratic Reform from 2011 to 2014. Previously, he served as Acting Governor of Aceh from 2004 to 2005 and Vice Governor of Aceh from 2000 to 2004.

== Biography ==
Abubakar was born in Banda Aceh, Indonesia on 21 June 1952. He received a bachelor's degree in architecture from the Bandung Institute of Technology, later receiving a master's degree in management from Syiah Kuala University in Aceh. After graduation, he began working as a consultant and entrepreneur. After the resignation of President Suharto in 1998, he became active in politics, co-founding the Aceh branch of the National Mandate Party.

From 2000 to 2004, Abubakar served as the deputy governor of Aceh, later becoming the acting governor from 2004 to 2005 after Governor Abdullah Puteh was convicted of corruption. As acting governor he handled the aftermath of the 2004 Indian Ocean earthquake and tsunami, with the amount of civil servants at first thought to have been reduced by almost two-thirds. He also had to deal with the Free Aceh Movement. He ran for governor in 2006 with Prosperous Justice Party member Nasir Djamil as his deputy, but lost to Irwandi Yusuf.

Abubakar was elected to the People's Representative Council in 2009, representing Aceh. He became a member of Commission I, which oversees defence and foreign affairs. On 19 October 2011, Abubakar replaced EE Mangindaan as the Administrative Reform Minister of Indonesia.

== Reception ==
Djamil viewed Abubakar's appointment as a way for President Susilo Bambang Yudhoyono to strengthen his support in Aceh and from the National Mandate Party. Abubakar's appointment as minister was met warmly in Aceh, with several prominent Acehnese calling him "the best son of Aceh".

== Personal life ==
Abubakar is married to Mutia Safrila, and together they have four children. According to the Report on Material Wealth of State Figures (Laporan Harta Kekayaan Penyelenggara Negara) published in February 2011, Abubakar has a net worth of over Rp 1.2 billion (US$150,000), the lowest of the six ministers appointed in October 2011.

Political offices
Preceded by Bustari Mansyur	Vice Governor of Aceh; 2000–2004	Succeeded by Muhammad Nazar
Preceded by Abdullah Puteh	Governor of Aceh; Acting; 2004–2005	Succeeded by Mustafa Abubakar
Preceded by E. E. Mangindaan	Minister of State Apparatus Utilization and Bureaucratic Reform; 2011–2014	Succeeded by Yuddy Chrisnandi
