= Muzakir Manaf =

Indonesian politician (born 1964)

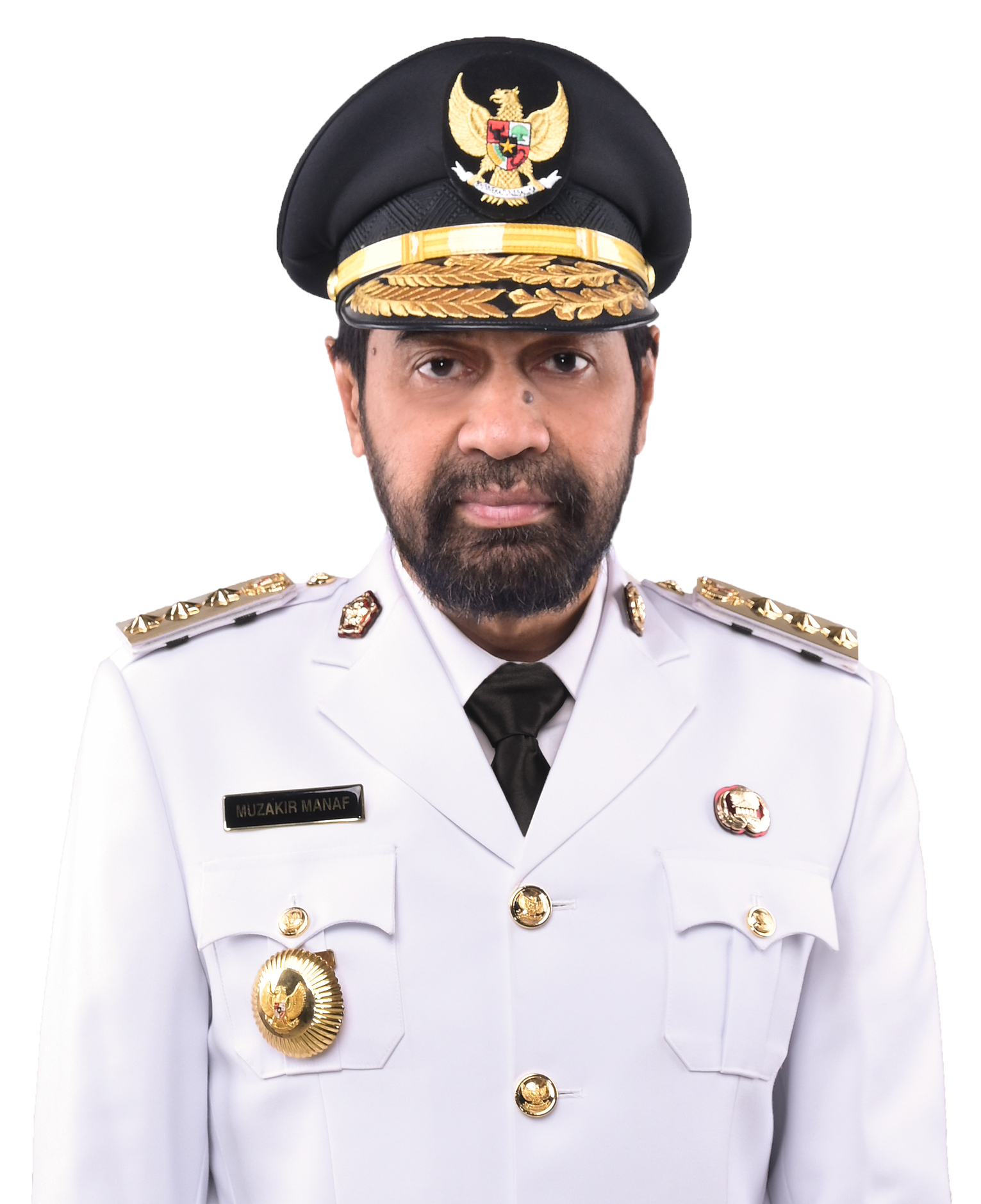
- Official portrait, 2025

15th Governor of Aceh
- Incumbent
- Assumed office 12 February 2025
- Vice Governor: Fadhlullah
- Preceded by: Nova Iriansyah (Governor); Bustami Hamzah (acting); Safrizal Zakaria Ali (acting)

9th Vice Governor of Aceh
- In office 25 June 2012 – 25 June 2017
- Governor: Zaini Abdullah
- Preceded by: Muhammad Nazar
- Succeeded by: Nova Iriansyah

1st Leader of Aceh Party
- Incumbent
- Assumed office 7 July 2007
- Preceded by: Party established

Personal details
- Born: 3 April 1964 (age 62) Mane Kawan, Seunuddon, North Aceh, Aceh, Indonesia
- Party: Aceh Party
- Other political affiliations: Gerindra (2013 –2022); KIM Plus (2024–present)
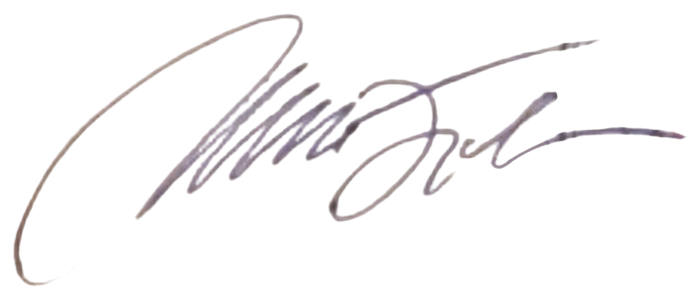
- Signature

Military service
- Allegiance: Aceh
- Branch/service: Free Aceh Movement
- Years of service: 1986–2005
- Rank: General

Muzakir Manaf (born 3 April 1964), also known as Mualem, is an Indonesian politician and former Free Aceh Movement (GAM) guerilla fighter who is currently serving as the governor of Aceh. Leading the movement's guerilla wing following the death of his predecessor, he was its leader at the end of the conflict and later founded the Aceh Party, becoming its first and current chairman. He also served as the vice governor of Aceh between 2012 and 2017.

== Early life ==
Muzakir Manaf was born in Seunuddon, North Aceh on 3 April 1964 to Manaf (father) and Zubaidah (mother). His father was a farmer with a limited income. Muzakir Manaf had been involved in the Insurgency in Aceh with the Free Aceh Movement (GAM) since the age of 19.

== Career ==
=== GAM ===
Manaf stated that when he graduated from high school, he signed up to join the Indonesian National Armed Forces, but failed and instead went to Malaysia to sign up as a GAM fighter, this time passing. In 1986, Manaf left for Libya, where he received combat training with other GAM members.

Following the death of GAM commander Abdullah Syafi'i in 2002 during combat with Indonesian Army soldiers, Muzakir Manaf became the commander of GAM's central command.

Following the Helsinki agreement, Manaf went out of hiding and entered public view for the first time, and began serving as the chairman of the Aceh Transition Committee (Indonesian: Komite Peralihan Aceh). Later on, he was one of the co-founders of the Self-Sufficient Aceh Movement Party (Indonesian: Partai Gerakan Aceh Mandiri or Partai GAM, later renamed to just Aceh Party following complaints from the central government) and became its first chairman.

=== Provincial government ===
In Aceh's 2012 gubernatorial election, Manaf ran as the running mate of fellow GAM member Zaini Abdullah and the pair won the election, with Manaf being sworn in as Vice Governor on 4 June 2012. Manaf was still popular with former GAM combatants even after his election. In one occasion, militant leader Din Minimi, who led an armed group in East Aceh, refused to be brought to Jakarta or Banda Aceh unless Manaf was to meet him first.

He ran again in the 2017 gubernatorial election, this time as a gubernatorial candidate. However, he was defeated by former governor Irwandi Yusuf. Initially, though, Manaf's campaign team also claimed victory and refused to accept the results.

At the national level, he joined Gerindra, a party of his former wartime adversary Prabowo Subianto, in 2013. It took Prabowo six months to contemplate about his membership and he once tried to reject it due to his status as the chairman of Aceh Party, but Manaf explained he wanted prosperity for Aceh and through Gerindra he may achieve it. Hearing his strong determination, Prabowo then approved his entry.

=== 2024 elections ===
On 26 December 2023, Manaf declared his support for Prabowo Subianto and Gibran Rakabuming Raka for president and vice president despite the opposing background of the two. After the pair won, Manaf was rumored to join Prabowo's cabinet which Manaf then said he chose to run for governor rather than be a minister. Manaf also revealed that he had once asked for 2 ministerial seats and 2 ambassadorships for the Aceh Party but as Aceh voted heavily for Anies Baswedan during the election, Manaf eventually did not pursue the matter.

He then ran in the 2024 Aceh gubernatorial election with Gerindra politician Fadhlullah as his running mate. With strong endorsements especially from Prabowo, the pair defeated Bustami Hamzah in the election, and was sworn in as governor on 12 February 2025.
