= Abdullah Muzakir Walad =

Aceh governor (1920–2023)

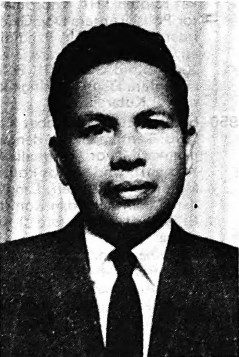

16th Governor of Aceh
- In office 23 March 1968 – 27 August 1978
- Deputy: Marzuki Nyakman
- Preceded by: Hasby Wahidi
- Succeeded by: Abdul Madjid Ibrahim

Personal details
- Born: 20 August 1920 Lubok Sukon, Aceh, Dutch East Indies
- Died: 2023 (aged 103)
- Party: Golkar

Military service
- Allegiance: Indonesia
- Branch/service: Indonesian Army
- Years of service: 1946-1952
- Rank: Lieutenant Colonel
- Unit: Infantry

Abdullah Muzakir Walad (20 August 1920 – 2023) was an Aceh figure who served as Governor of Aceh from 1968 to 1978. He was a teacher, school principal, soldier, businessman, consultant, and adviser. His family nicknamed him “Muzzi”.

== Early life ==
Abdullah Muzakir Walad was born in Lubok Sukon, 20 August 1920. He finished his primary education at Hollandsch-Inlandsche School Sigli in 1935. Afterward, he continued high school at Meer Uitgebreid Lager Onderwijs and graduated in 1939. Walad continued his higher education at Kweekschool (Teacher training school) Muhammadiyah Yogyakarta and graduated in 1941.

== Career ==
After graduated from teacher training school, Walad started his career as a teacher and school principal at Sekolah Rakyat (People's School) VI from 1942 to 1946. He joined the military service when he worked as a teacher and school principal. In 1942, he enlisted in the KNIIL patrol troop, Stadswacht. One year later, he received semi-military education at a teacher training school run by the Japanese occupation government.

=== Military ===
After the proclamation of independence, Walad joined a pro-Indonesia militia group, Lasykar Rakyat, in Ingin Jaya and served as a company commander. He held this position while he was working as a teacher and school principal.

Later, he resigned as a teacher and school principal and joined the military. He participated in Sumatran Army Police Officer Training in Bukittinggi and graduated in 1946 with the rank of captain for being the best graduate. On 25 April 1947, Walad enlisted in Division X of TRI and served as Commander of Section-VIII/Army Police.

In June 1947, Daud Beureu'eh created Indonesian National Army in Aceh, Langkat, and Karo Military Region and Walad was appointed Commander of Police Army Division X in Kutaraja. At that time, Walad held the rank of major. After that, Abdullah Muzakir held various military positions, such as Commander of the Langkat and Tanah Karo Military Police Corps and Commander of Battalion IV CPM Sumatra.

Walad was honorably discharged from the military in 1952 with the rank of Lieutenant Colonel. Nevertheless, he was still entrusted to carry out tasks related to the military. In 1961, he was appointed a member of Delegation 28, which was tasked to negotiate with Daud Beureuh to end the Darul Islam insurrection in Aceh.

=== Business ===
Resigning from military service, Walad decided to start his business career. He moved to Jakarta and worked as manager of NV Permai from 1953 to 1960.

Then, he returned to Aceh and became the director of PT Panca Usaha from 1961 to 1967. During his tenure as PT Panca Usaha's director, he held another position, such as Director Fa. H.M Amin, Chairman of the Provisional's Association of Indonesian Export Entrepreneurs (GPEIS), Chairman of Consultative Body of National Private Businessmen (BAMUNAS) Aceh, Director of Trade Section of BAPIPDA, and Authorities of the Board of Directors of the Aceh Roadway Authority Agency.

== Governor of Aceh ==
On 23 March 1968, Suharto appointed Abdullah Muzakir Walad and Marzuki Nyakman as Governor and Vice Governor of Aceh, respectively. As a Governor of Aceh, he held other positions, which were member of the People's Consultative Assembly in 1972 and 1977 and chairman of the Board of Trustees of the Aceh Kokarmendagri and Korpri Level I Aceh (1968–1978).

During his tenure as a governor, he moved Johan Köhler's grave from Tanah Abang to Kerkhoff, Banda Aceh because Tanah Abang Graveyard wanted to be evicted. Besides, he removed kawedanan status in Aceh on 18 November 1974. Likewise, Center for Documentation and Information of Aceh was established under his rule.

== Career Continuation ==
After completing his term as Governor of Aceh, Abdullah Muzakir became Advisor to Mobil Oil Indonesia and Consultant for PT Arun LNG.

== Death ==
Walad's death was announced on October 8, 2023. He was 103.
