= SMA Labschool Unsyiah =

Location
- Kuta Inong Balee 2 Rd, Darussalam; Banda Aceh, Aceh; Indonesia; 5.57462°N 95.365684°E

Information
- School type: Private
- Motto: Acehnese: Cét langét ("Dream dreams")
- Status: RSBI (Rintisan Sekolah Bertaraf Internasional)
- Headmaster: Hendra Darmawan, S.Si.
- Grades: 10–12
- Enrollment: ± 300
- Average class size: 25
- Website: www.labschoolunsyiah.sch.id

Sekolah Laboratorium Unsyiah, also known as SMA Labschool Unsyiah, is a community-based school that is a part of the Universitas Syiah Kuala complex in Banda Aceh, Aceh, Indonesia.

== Background ==
After the devastating 2004 Indian Ocean earthquake and tsunami hit Banda Aceh in 2004, USINDO (The United States-Indonesia Society) built the school for children who were victims of the disaster.

SMA Labschool was inaugurated on 27 July 2007 by the rector of Universitas Syiah Kuala, Head of BRR Aceh-Nias, and common-head of United States-Indonesia Society (USINDO) Edward Masters and Arifin Siregar. The school was designed by an architect from Syiah Kuala University. On 5 June 2005, Pemerintah Provinsi Aceh through Dinas Pendidikan issued operational approval of SMA Laboratorium Universitas Syiah Kuala.

In October 2010, three years after its opening ceremony, SMA Labschool Unsyiah was appointed to be one of Rintisan Sekolah Bertaraf Internasional.

== Facilities ==
- Laboratories for Physics, Chemistry and Biology,
- Computer Lab with 24 Linux computers and one server to perform e-learning with Moodle,
- Library. On 28 January 2010, United States Ambassador for Indonesia, Cameron R. Hume visited SMA Labschool to donate US$100,000 to further develop the library.
- Arts Lab equipped with musical instruments, including a drum kit, an electronic keyboard, electric guitars, and a bass guitar. Such instruments are rare and almost cannot be found in public schools in Aceh.
- An internet wi-fi zone which can be accessed by students from 8 am to 4 pm daily.

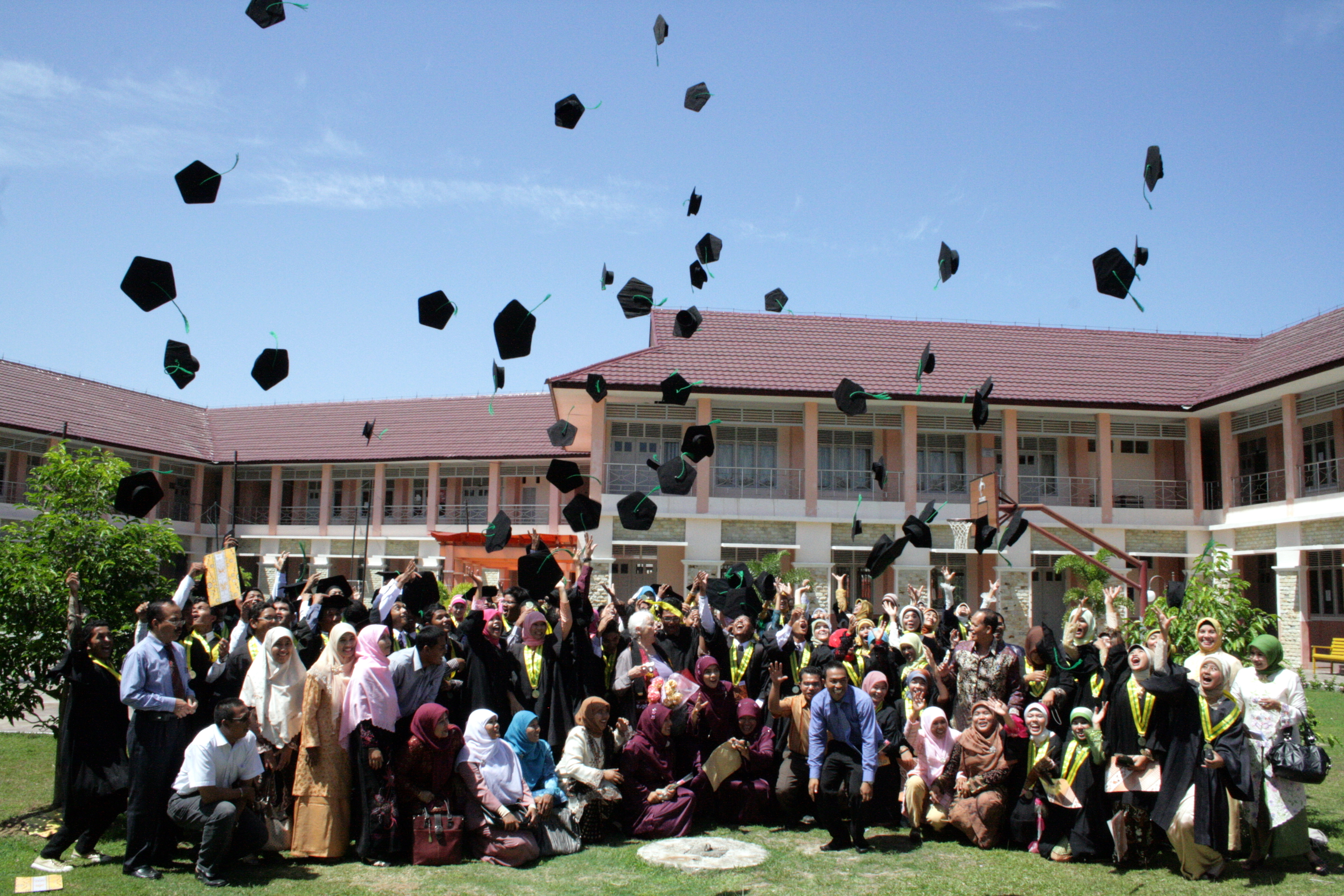
Graduation of the first alumni
