= 2012 Aceh gubernatorial election =

2012 Acehnese gubernatorial election
- 9 April 2012
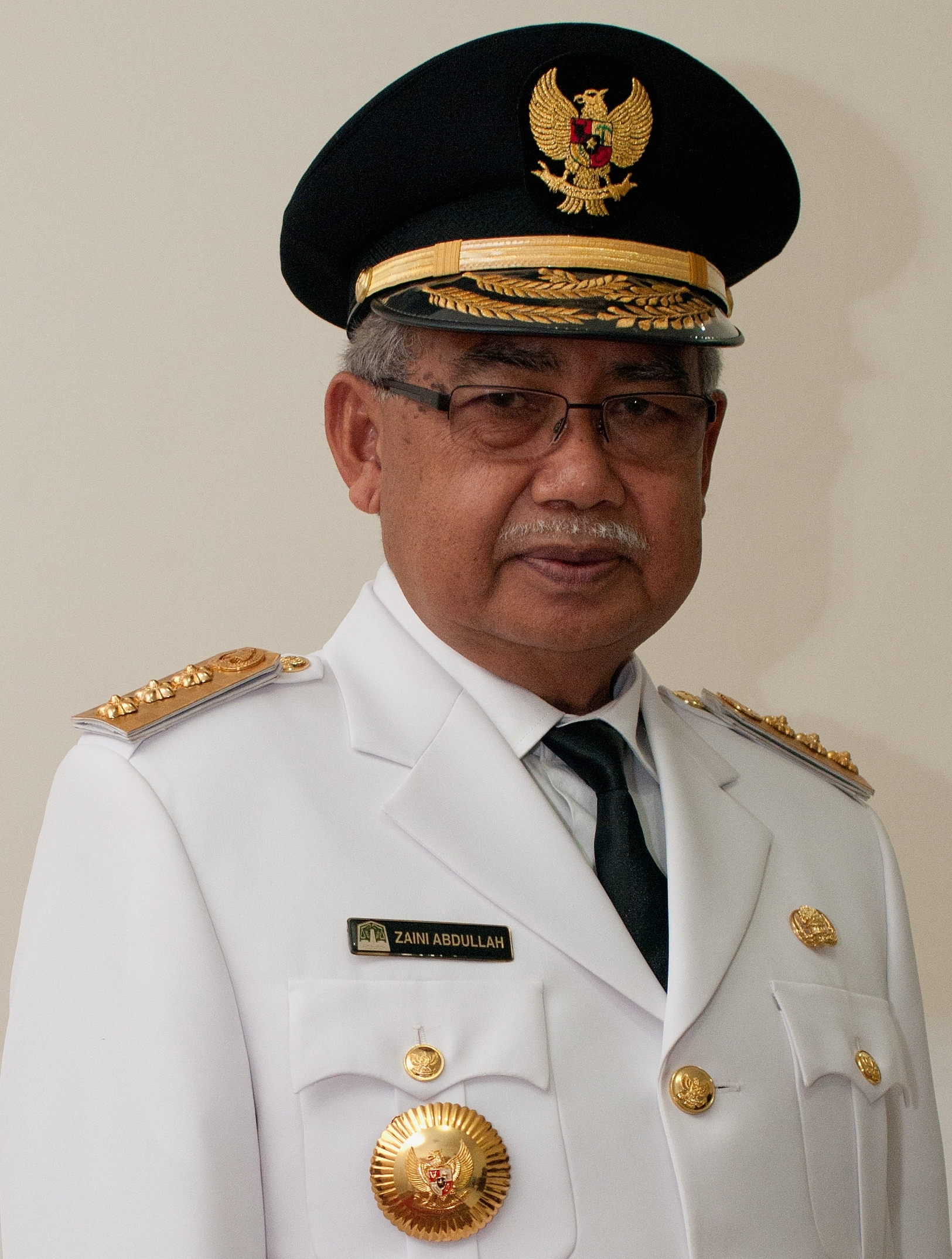

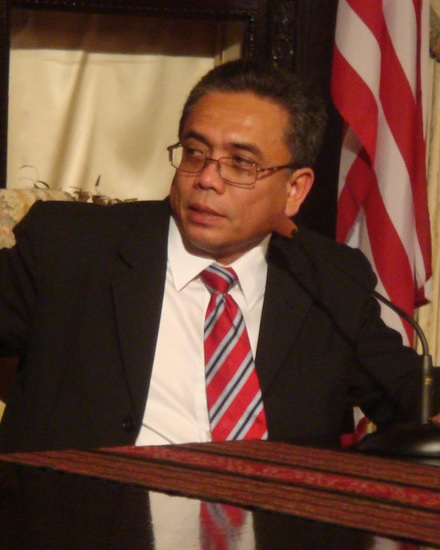
Nominee	Zaini Abdullah	Irwandi Yusuf
Party	Aceh Party	Independent
Running mate	Muzakir Manaf	Muhyan Yunan
Popular vote	1,327,695	694,515
Percentage	55.9%	29.2%
Governor before election
Irwandi Yusuf
Independent
Elected Governor
Zaini Abdullah
Aceh Party

An election was held on 9 April 2012 for the governorship and deputy-governorship of Aceh. Incumbent governor Irwandi Yusuf ran as an independent, while former exile and Free Aceh Movement (GAM) activist Zaini Abdullah competed for the governorship on behalf of the Aceh Party with Muzakir Manaf as running mate. The election was the second to take place in the devolved Aceh region since the post-earthquake/tsunami Helsinki agreement between the Indonesian government and the GAM. The previous gubernatorial election in Aceh had been held in December 2006.

Zaini Abdullah was sworn into office as governor of Aceh for the five-year period 2012-2017 in an official ceremony in the provincial capital of Aceh, Banda Aceh, on 25 June 2012. Arrangements for the ceremony were, however, marred by some violence when there was a personal assault on the former governor, Irwandi Yusuf, and a grenade attack earlier in the day at the house of a local GAM leader. Following investigation by police two men were arrested and sentenced to 12 and eight years imprisonment by judges at Central Jakarta District Court.

== Candidates ==
- Tgk. H. Ahmad Tajuddin & Ir. H. Teuku Suriansyah
- Drh. Irwandi Yusuf & Dr. Ir. Muhyan Yunan
- Prof. Dr. H. Darni M Daud & Dr. Tgk. Ahmad Fauzi
- H. Muhammad Nazar & Ir. Nova Iriansyah
- Dr. H. Zaini Abdullah & Muzakir Manaf

== Result ==
Final results were released on 17 April 2012:

Candidate	Running mate	Party	Votes	%
Zaini Abdullah	Muzakir Manaf	Aceh Party	1,327,695	55.78
Irwandi Yusuf	Muhyan Yunan	Independent	694,515	29.18
Muhammad Nazar	Nova Iriansyah		182,079	7.65
Darni M Daud	Ahmad Fauzi		96,767	4.07
Teungku Ahmad Tajuddin	Teuku Suriansyah		79,330	3.33
Total			2,380,386	100.00
Valid votes			2,380,386	96.87
Invalid/blank votes			76,810	3.13
Total votes			2,457,196	100.00
Registered voters/turnout			3,244,729	75.73
