= List of governors of Aceh =

Head of government of Aceh, Indonesia

Governor of Aceh
- Gubernur Aceh
- Coat of arms of Aceh

- Flag of Aceh (non–civil)

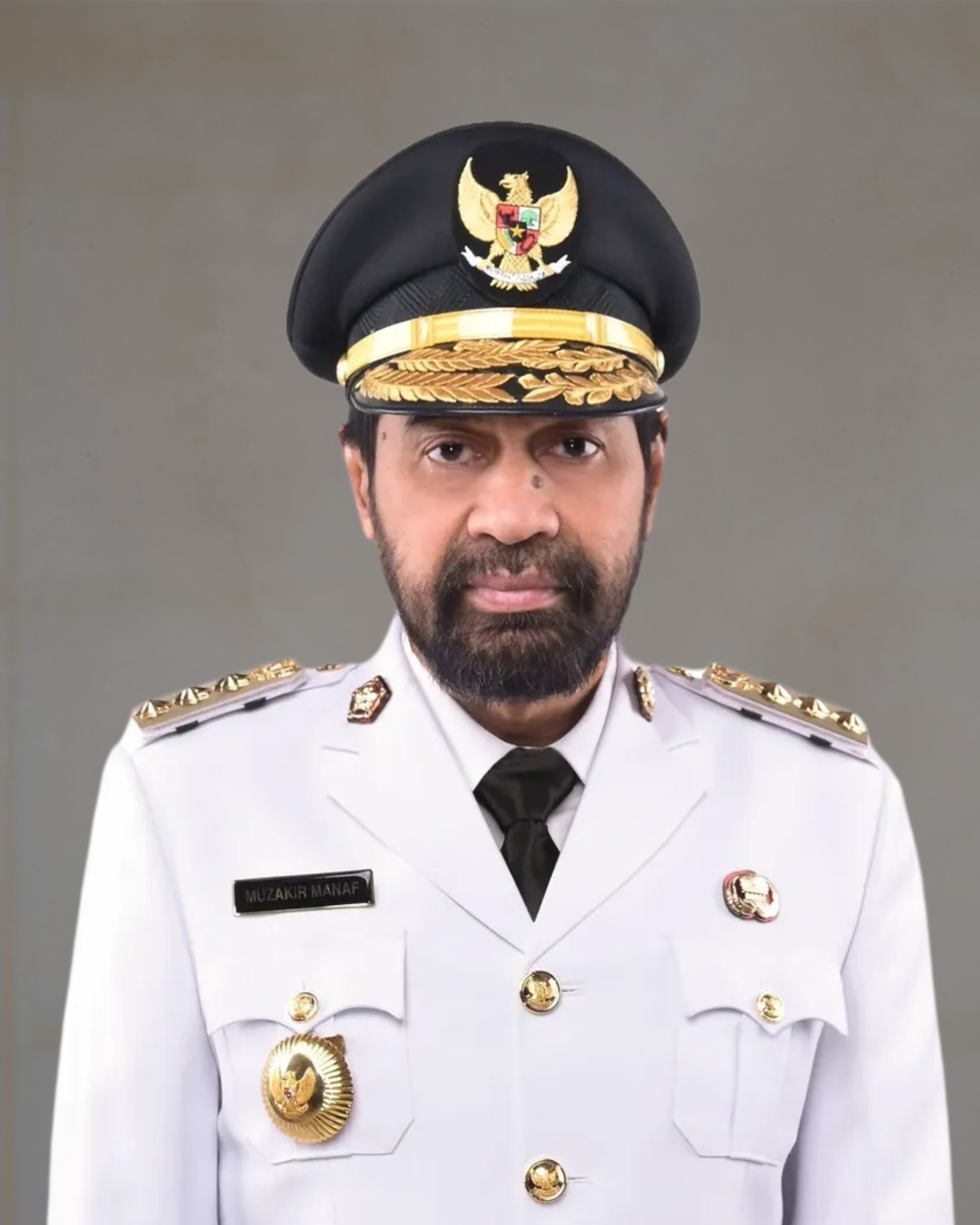
- Incumbent; Muzakir Manaf since 12 February 2025
- Aceh Provincial Government
- Style: Mr. Governor (informal); The Honorable (formal); His Excellency (diplomatic)
- Type: Chief executive
- Status: Head of government
- Abbreviation: GOA (in English); Gub. Aceh (in Indonesian)
- Residence: Meuligoe
- Seat: Banda Aceh
- Nominator: Political parties and Independent
- Appointer: Direct popular elections within Aceh (Note: since 2006, previously via Aceh House of Representatives) or President
- Term length: Five years, renewable once 1 years (specifically for the acting governor)
- Inaugural holder: Teuku Nyak Arif
- Formation: 3 October 1945; 80 years ago (as Resident of Aceh)
- Deputy: Vice Governor of Aceh
- Salary: Rp3 million (US$213,17) per month
- Website: www.acehprov.go.id

The Governor of Aceh (Indonesian: Gubernur Aceh) is an elected politician who, along with the vice governor and 81 members of the Aceh House of Representatives, is accountable for the strategic government of the province of Aceh. Below is a list of governors of Aceh, one of the provinces of Indonesia, since the Indonesian independence to the present day.

== List of governors ==
- = Acting governor, in place until a full governor was formerly appointed

=== Resident of Aceh (1945–1949) ===
#	Portrait	Name	Took office	Left office	Period	Note
1		Teuku Nyak Arif	3 October 1945	1946	1	(Note: As Resident of Aceh, under the Governor of Sumatra)
2		Teuku Daud Syah	1946	1947	2	
3		Teungku Daud Beureu'eh	1947	1950	3	

=== Governor of Aceh (1949–1950) ===
#	Portrait	Name	Took office	Left office	Period	Note
1		Teungku Daud Beureu'eh	1947	1950	3	

=== Resident of Aceh (1950–1956) ===
#	Portrait	Name	Took office	Left office	Period	Note	Vice Governor
3		Teungku Daud Beureu'eh	1950	1951	4		
4		B. M. Danubroto (Coordinator Resident)	1951	1953	5		
5		Teuku Sulaiman Daud (Government Coordinator)	Mei 1953	September 1953	6		
—		Abdul Wahab	1953	1954	6		
6		Abdul Razak	1954	1956	7		

=== Governor of Aceh (1956–present) ===
#	Portrait	Name	Took office	Left office	Term	Note	Vice Governor
2		Ali Hasyimi	1957	1959	8		
2		Ali Hasyimi	1959	1964	9	(Note: In 1959, named "Governor of the Special Region of Aceh")	
3		Nyak Adam Kamil	10 April 1964	30 August 1966	10		
4		Hasby Wahidi	30 August 1967	15 May 1968	11		
5		Abdullah Muzakir Walad	15 May 1968	27 June 1973	12		
5		Abdullah Muzakir Walad	27 June 1973	27 August 1978	13		
6		Abdul Madjid Ibrahim	27 August 1978	15 March 1981	14		
—		Eddy Sabara	15 March 1981	27 August 1981	14		
7		Hadi Thayeb	27 August 1981	27 August 1986	15		
8		Ibrahim Hassan	27 August 1986	25 May 1993	16		
9		Syamsudin Mahmud	26 May 1993	26 May 1998	17		Zainuddin AG
9		Syamsudin Mahmud	26 May 1998	21 June 2000	18	(Note: In June 2000, Syamsudin Mahmud was appointed Deputy Head of the National Development Planning Agency (Bappenas))	
—		Ramli Ridwan (Acting)	21 June 2000	25 November 2000	18		
10		Abdullah Puteh	25 November 2000	19 July 2004	19	(Note: In 2001 it was named "Governor of Nanggroe Aceh Darussalam") (Note: Pada tahun 2004, Abdullah Puteh dinonaktifkan dari jabatannya karena divonis melakukan tindak pidana korupsi)	Azwar Abubakar
—		Azwar Abubakar (Acting)	19 July 2004	30 December 2005	19	(Note: Replacing the position of Abdullah Puteh who was deactivated)	—
—		Mustafa Abubakar (Daily Acting)	30 December 2005	8 February 2007	—		—
11		Irwandi Yusuf	8 February 2007	8 February 2012	20	(Note: In 2009, named 'Governor of Aceh')	Muhammad Nazar
—		Tarmizi Abdul Karim (Acting)	8 February 2012	25 June 2012	—		—
12		Zaini Abdullah	25 June 2012	25 June 2017	21		Muzakir Manaf
—		Soedarmo (Acting)	28 October 2016	11 February 2017	—	(Note: Menggantikan sementara Gubernur dan Wagub petahana yang berkampanye di Pilgub 2017)	—
—		Dermawan (Daily Acting)	25 June 2017	5 July 2017	—	(Note: Replace the Governor and Vice Governor of 2012-2017 term of office whose term has expired.)	—
13		Irwandi Yusuf	5 July 2017	5 July 2018	22		Nova Iriansyah
—		Nova Iriansyah	5 July 2018	5 November 2020	22		—
14		Nova Iriansyah	5 November 2020	5 July 2022	22		—
—		Achmad Marzuki (acting)	6 July 2022	22 August 2024	—	(Note: Replace the Governor Presidential Decree of the Republic of Indonesia Number 70/P/2022 concerning the Ratification of the Dismissal of the Governor of Aceh for the remainder of the 2017-2022 term of office and the Appointment of the Acting Governor of Aceh.)	—
—		Safrizal Zakaria Ali (acting)	22 August 2024	12 February 2025	—		—
15		Muzakir Manaf	12 February 2025	Present			
