= Darni M Daud =

Prof. Darni M Daud (born 25 July 1961, Pidie, Indonesia) is the former rector of Syiah Kuala University (USK) in Aceh, Indonesia, the largest state university in Banda Aceh beside Universitas Islam Negeri Ar-Raniry. He was recently re-elected in March 2010, in recognition of his efforts to rebuild the university after the 2004 tsunami. In 2008, the CampusAsia Magazine named him as the 7th best education leader in Indonesia.

== Biography ==
Daud graduated from the University of Syiah Kuala in 1985. He studied in the University of Sydney, Australia for a diploma. Then undertook a master's degree in Inter-cultural Communications at New York University, and a Phd in Higher Education at Oregon State University. He received many scholarships such as the Fulbright Scholarship and the Indonesian Cultural Foundation scholarship.

== Political career ==
Daud has been involved in many organizations, and has led many important conferences and seminars across Aceh and Indonesia, such as the Pekan Kebudayaan Aceh (PKA), which is a quadrennial event to promote the culture of Nanggroe Aceh Darussalam. He has been actively involved in the reconstruction and rehabilitation of Aceh from the damage caused by the Great Asian tsunami in 2004, and has been actively raising funds to develop the quality of education in Aceh. He ran for governor for the 2011-2015 period, and currently running again for the 2024-2029 period.
