= Zaini Abdullah =

Indonesian politician (1940–2026)

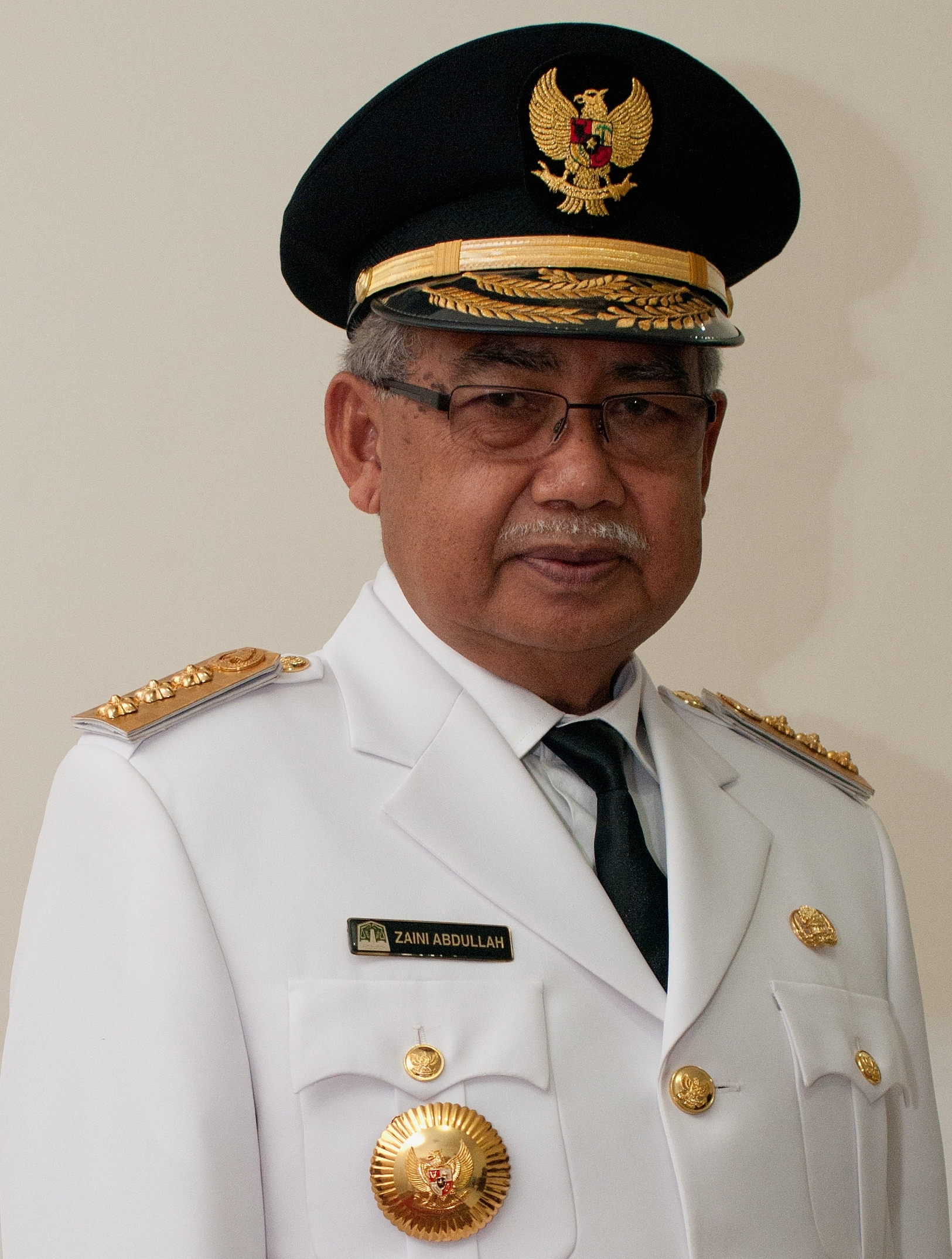
- Abdullah in 2012

17th Governor of Aceh
- In office 25 June 2012 – 25 June 2017
- Preceded by: Irwandi Yusuf (Governor); Tarmizi Abdul Karim (Acting)
- Succeeded by: Irwandi Yusuf

Personal details
- Born: 24 April 1940 Pidie, Gouvernment of Atjeh and Dependencies, Dutch East Indies
- Died: 13 June 2026 (aged 86) Banda Aceh, Indonesia
- Party: Aceh Party
- Profession: Medical doctor

Zaini Abdullah (24 April 1940 – 13 June 2026) was an Indonesian politician and separatist activist of the Free Aceh Movement (or GAM, Gerakan Aceh Merdeka) who was elected as the governor of the province of Aceh in the 2012 election for a five-year period from 2012 to 2017. Elected with 56% of the vote, Zaini Abdullah is the second governor directly chosen by the electors of Aceh since the granting of restricted autonomy to the area by the Indonesian government in 2005. His predecessor Irwandi Yusuf, who was elected in 2006 for the period from 2007 to 2012, was the first governor chosen in the province by direct elections.

Abdullah was sworn into office as governor in a ceremony held in conjunction with a plenary session of the Aceh Provincial Legislative Assembly (DPRA or Dewan Perwakilan Rakyat Aceh) in Banda Aceh, 25 June 2012. The ceremony and other official arrangements were, however, marred by a personal assault on the former governor, Irwandi Yusuf, by supporters of the new governor and by a grenade attack earlier in the day at the house of a local GAM leader.

== Background ==
Zaini Abdullah was born in Beureunun in the Pidie District (Kabupaten Pidie), Aceh in 1940. His father, Tengku H. Abdullah Hanafiah, was a supporter of Daud Beureueh, a prominent leader in Aceh during the 1950s and 1960s and into the 1970s. Zaini Abdullah's schooling years were spent in Aceh and North Sumatra:

- 1947–52: Primary school, Beureunuen, Pidie District, Aceh
- 1953–57: Middle-level school (Sekolah Menengah Pertama), Sigli, Aceh
- 1957–60: Higher-level school (Sekolah Menengah Atas), Banda Aceh, Aceh
- 1960–72: Medical Faculty, University of North Sumatra, Medan, North Sumatra.

He later practised as a medical specialist in Aceh and North Sumatra in various areas:

- 1972–75: Head of a health clinic (Puskesmas) and head of the general hospital in Kuala Simpang, East Aceh district
- 1975–77: Specialist, medical studies in obstetrics, Pirngadi General Hospital, University of North Sumatra, Medan.

In 1976, when the GAM declared their open opposition to Jakarta central government policies in Aceh, Zaini Abdullah joined with the GAM and became a close adviser to Hasan di Tiro, the founder of the GAM. In 1981, Zaini followed Hasan di Tiro to live in Sweden, travelling through Medan and Singapore. In Sweden he studied at Uppsala University for a medical degree and between 1990 and 1995 practised as a doctor. Later, in 2002 when negotiations over the insurgency in Aceh were arranged in Tokyo, he was a member of the GAM delegation to the discussions. During the next few years, as a member of GAM delegations he took part in other meetings to discuss a peace agreement in Aceh.

Abdullah died on 14 June 2026, at the age of 86.

== Political career ==
Abdullah was a co-founder and former foreign minister of the GAM while his running mate in the 2012 elections, Muzakir Manaf, was a GAM guerrilla commander. The pairing of Abdullah and Manaf as running mates for the 2012 elections was seen as a move to combine the older and younger generation of GAM activists.

Both Abdullah and Manaf were closely involved in the various stages of the negotiations to end the GAM resistance and implement a peace process in Aceh. They were, especially, both key members of the GAM negotiating team during the negotiations in 2005 which led to the signing of the Helsinki MOU on 15 August 2005. Various statements which both of them made during the 2012 gubernatorial election campaign suggest that they are not satisfied that the Indonesian Government in Jakarta has yet fulfilled the terms of the MOU.

At the time of their election, Abdullah was aged 72 while Manaf, aged 39, represented the next generation of GAM activists. The campaign ticket was supported by the Aceh Party, a local Acehnese political party mainly composed of former GAM activists, as well as a number of other key political parties. The Aceh Party had earlier won a majority of seats in the Aceh Provincial Legislative Assembly (DPRA, or Dewan Perwakilan Rakyat Aceh) in the 2009 provincial elections and is an influential party in Aceh. Abdullah has spent close to one-third of his life supporting the activities of the GAM, including during the lengthy period when he lived in exile in Sweden along with chief GAM patron, Hasan di Tiro, who died in Aceh in June 2010. Abdullah's younger brother, Hasbi Abdullah, is chair of the Aceh Provincial Legislative Assembly.

== Role as governor ==
During the campaign for the 2012 elections Abdullah placed considerable emphasis on the importance of strengthening Islamic values across Aceh. He also said that he wished to see more attention given to the implementation of the provisions of the Helsinki MOU, signed in August 2005, which brought reconciliation in Aceh between the GAM and the Indonesian Government.

The transformation of GAM from a guerrilla movement into an established and integrated part of the formal Acehnese political landscape has been accepted by the Indonesian Government in Jakarta. On one hand, the Indonesian national leadership in Jakarta appears to take the view that it is best to bring the former guerrilla freedom fighters into the national political fold. On the other hand, there is nervousness in Jakarta about agreeing to special arrangements for the province of Aceh because of the precedents that this approach might set for political agreements with other provinces across Indonesia.

One major challenge for Abdullah as governor of Aceh would be to mediate between the strong regional pressures from within Aceh for greater autonomy and the insistence of the national government in Jakarta that governance arrangements in Aceh remain consistent with Indonesia-wide principles of government. Another difficult challenge he faced was promoting economic growth and development in the province, which has been held back by local conflict stretching out over almost three decades from 1976 until the signing of a peace agreement in Helsinki in 2005.

== Record as governor ==
=== 2013 ===
In early 2013 it was revealed that Abdullah, despite his earlier promise that he was in favour of preserving Aceh's eco bio-diversity, made a decision allowing for continuing deforestation. A new logging proposal came to light in October 2012 when the newly installed Abdullah wrote to Indonesia's Minister of Forestry proposing the conversion of protected forests to logging concessions.

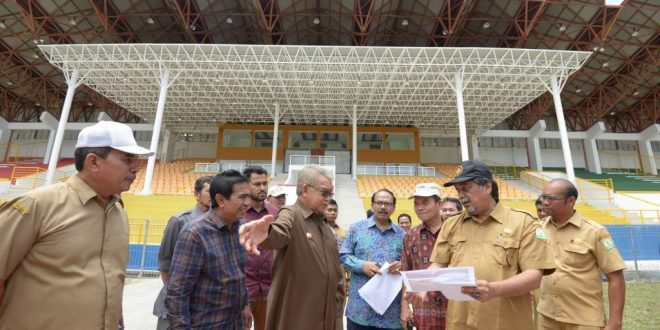
Abdullah when inspecting a stadium in 2017

Also during the early part of 2013, Abdullah was faced with a range of issues arising from activism in the Aceh provincial parliament (DPRA or Dewan Perwakilan Rakyat Aceh). The DPRA announced support for various measures, some with the force of provincial law (Qanun), announced in earlier years by the Aceh Freedom Movement (GAM or Gerakan Aceh Merdeka) or written into the 2005 Helsinki MOU for Aceh. These included the promulgation of a new flag for Aceh identical to the GAM flag used before the signing of the Helsinki Peace Accord, a new coat-of-arms for the province, and support for the establishment of truth and reconciliation commission to investigate abuses of rights in the province before the signing of the Helsinki MOU in 2005. The proposal to promulgate a provincial flag identical to the earlier GAM flag met with a sharp response from the central government in April when president Susilo Bambang Yudhoyono, using unusually pointed language, warned of the recurrence of war in Aceh.

=== 2014 ===
Difficulties between the central government and politicians in Aceh over the issue of the provincial flag continued during 2014. After the new administration in Jakarta under president Joko Widodo took office in October, it was proposed to Aceh leaders that they agree to drop the plan to adopt their preferred flag in return for certain concessions from Jakarta. The new Coordinating Minister for Political, Legal and Security affairs, Tedjo Edhy Purdijanto said that Jakarta was prepared to provide certain mining concessions to Aceh provided the demand to adopt a flag very similar to the GAM flag was dropped.

== See also ==
- Free Aceh Movement
- Insurgency in Aceh
- 2006 Acehnese gubernatorial election
- 2012 Acehnese gubernatorial election
