= Syiah Kuala University =

University in Banda Aceh, Indonesia

Coordinates: 5°34′15.6″N 95°22′11.4″E

- Universitas Syiah Kuala
- Logo
- Motto: Jantong Hatee Rakyat Aceh
- Motto in English: Heart of Acehnese People
- Type: State university
- Established: 2 September 1961
- Rector: Prof. Dr. Ir. Marwan, IPU
- Location: Banda Aceh, Indonesia
- Campus: Darussalam
- Campus area: 1,324,300 m^{2}
- Website: usk.ac.id

Syiah Kuala University (Indonesian: Universitas Syiah Kuala), abbreviated as USK (formerly: Unsyiah), founded on 2 September 1961, is the largest and the oldest national university in Banda Aceh, Indonesia. The name of the university is taken from the prominent theologian, Tengku Abdur Rauf As-Sinkili, who lived in the 16th century.

USK has twelve faculties, providing Associate, Bachelor, and master's degrees. USK has 131 laboratories for student lab work, student and lecturer experiments, and community service. The laboratories are spread across departments and faculties as follows: economics 2, veterinary science 11, law 1 engineering 29, agriculture 17, medical 27, mathematics and natural sciences 26, and one integrated laboratory.

== History ==
In the government's period of Sultan Iskandar Muda, Aceh became the science development centre. The students and the teachers came from around the world, such as Turkish Sultanate, Iran, and India. During 1957, the beginning of the Acehnese Province was formed, the leaders of the Acehnese government agreed to place the foundation for the development of Acehnese regional education. On 21 April 1958, Yayasan Dana Kesejahteraan Aceh (YDKA) was formed.

YDKA was led by Regent M. Husen and afterward by Governor Ali Hasjmy. On 29 June 1958, the ruler of the Acehnese formed a special commission. The creator's commission was chaired by Governor Ali Hasjmy and Lieutenant Colonel T. Hamzah as the vice-chairman. His first work was to create Darussalam city as for student's city and Syiah Kuala for the name of university. Efforts were carried out by YDKA with the founder of the commission to bring about the Darussalam development and Syiah Kuala University.

The student's city of Darussalam was officially opened by President Sukarno on 2 September 1959, accompanied by the cover opening of the Darussalam monument and the appointment of the first faculty of the Syiah Kuala University: the Faculty of Economics. The next 2 September was appointed as the Day of Education of Nanggroe Aceh Darussalam and is commemorated every year by the Acehnese people.

The embryo of USK was begun from the Faculty of Economics and was continued with the formation of the Faculty of Veterinary Science and Animal Husbandry in 1960. USK as a university officially began on 21 June 1961. Along with that, USK opened the Faculty of Teacher Training and Pedagogy, and the Law Faculty and Human Knowledge. The development was followed by the founding of the Engineering Faculty, Agricultural Faculty, General Medicine Faculty, and Mathematic and Natural Science Faculty.

In 1998, Syiah Kuala University received a new student for a doctorate degree program in the field of Economic Knowledge.

Since being established, USK has been led by Colonel M. Jasin, Drs. Marsuki Nyak Man. A. Madjid Ibrahim, henceforth Prof. Dr. Ibrahim Hasan, MBA., Prod. Dr. Abdullah Ali, M.Sc., Dr. M. Ali Basyah Amin, MA., Prof. Dr. Dayan Dawood, MA., Pfeuidrof. Dr. Abdi A. Wahab, M.Sc, Prof. Dr. Darni M. Daud, M.A, and now headed by Prof. Dr. Ir. Samsul Rizal, M.Eng.

== Faculties and departments ==
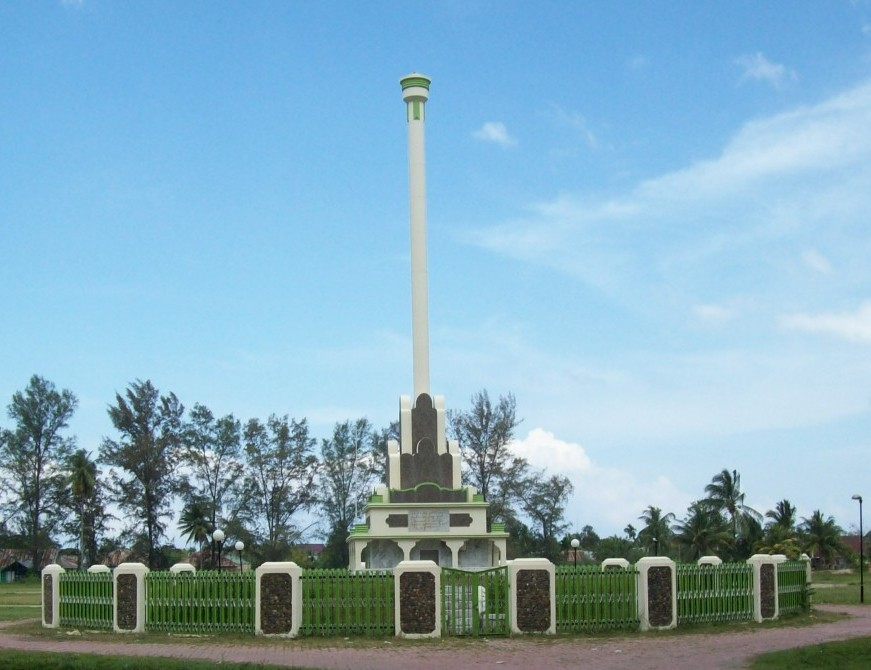
Darussalam monument at Syiah Kuala University

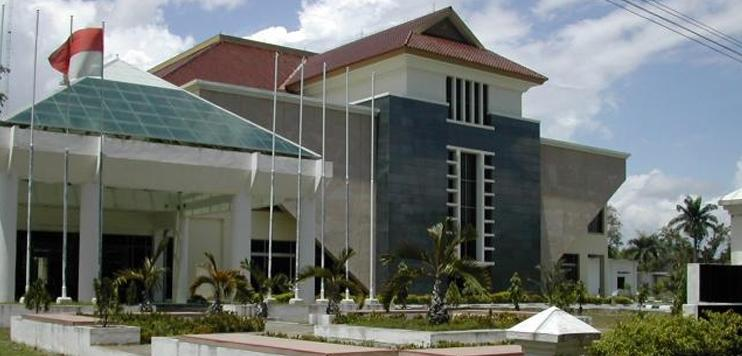
Rectorat building

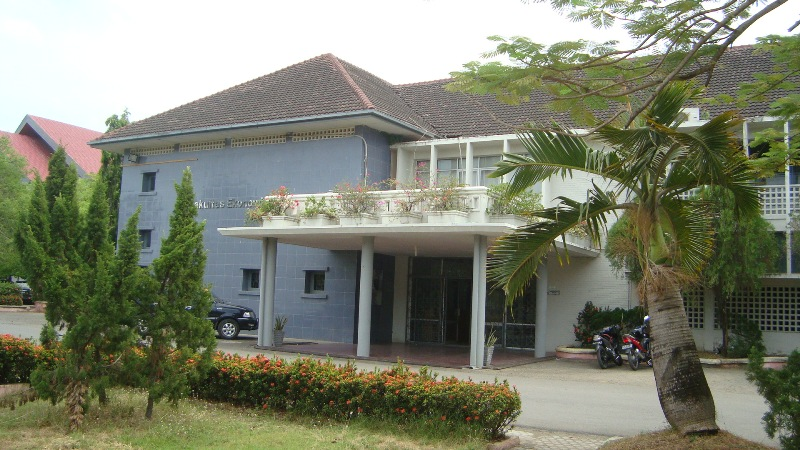
Economic faculty building. The oldest faculty in Syiah Kuala University

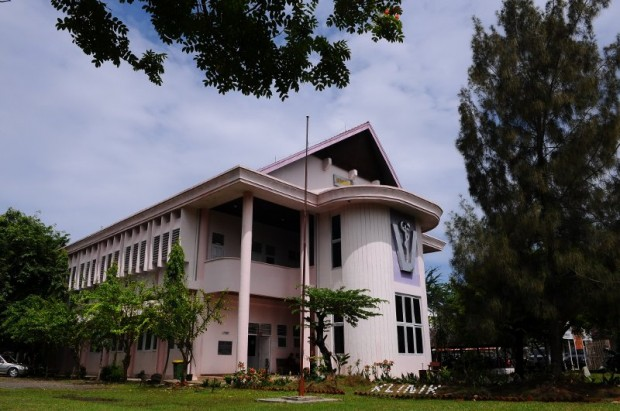
Veterinary Science building

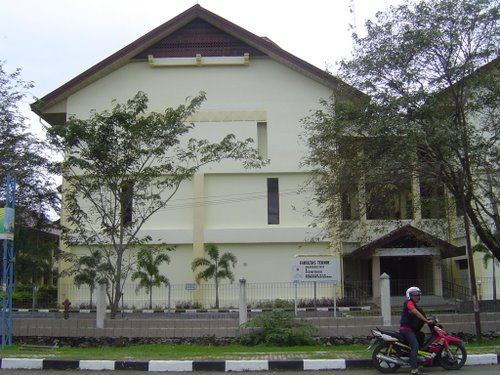
Engineering faculty building

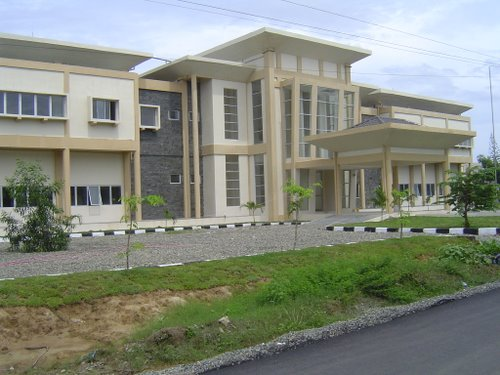
Mathematic and Natural Science faculty building

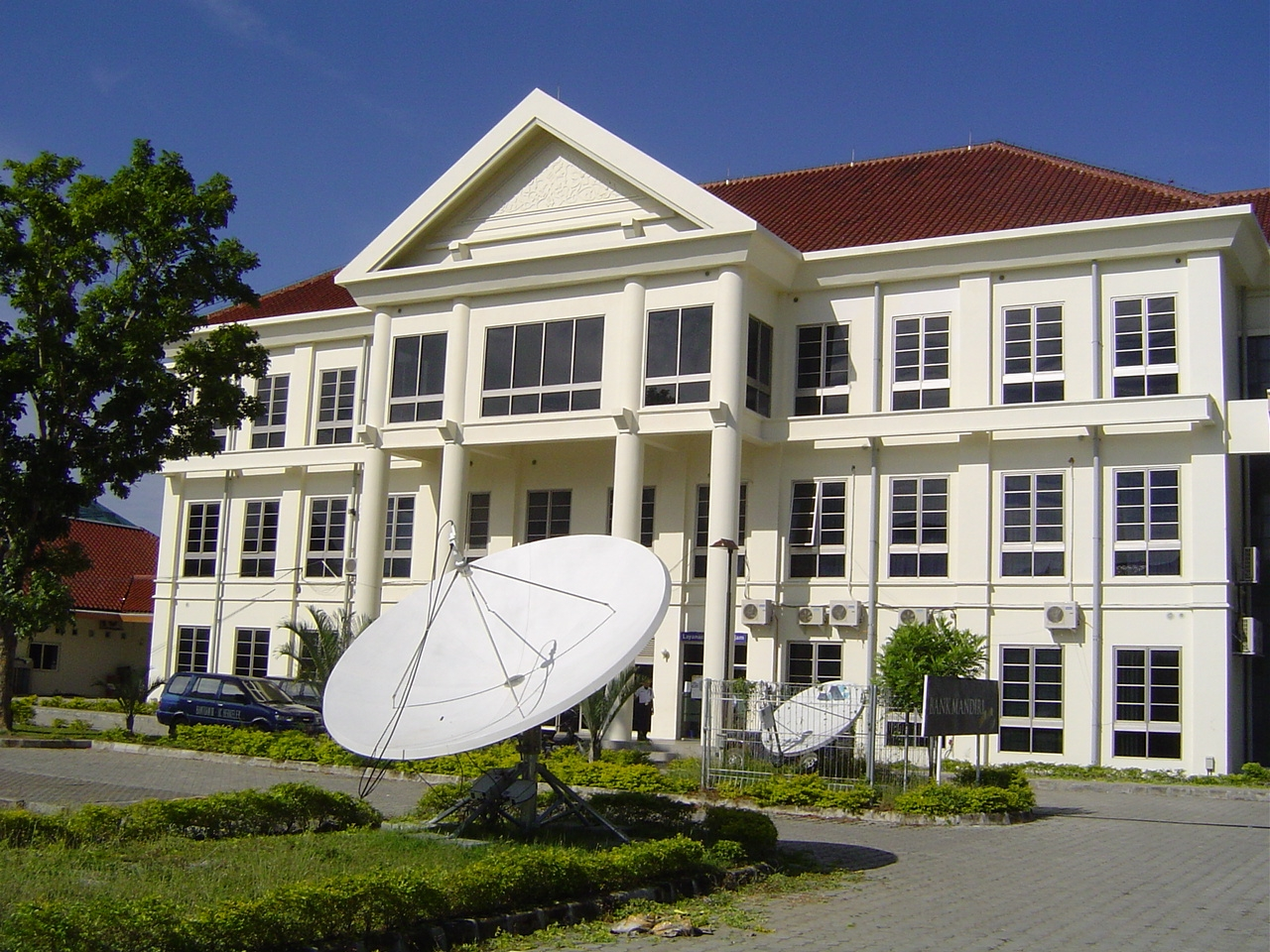
SOI Asia project (satellite) at Syiah Kuala University http://www.soi.asia/site/satellite.html

There are twelve faculties for undergraduate programs and seven faculties for graduate programme.

=== Undergraduate programs ===
- Faculty of Economics: departments of development studies, management, and accounting.
- Faculty of Veterinary Science: department of veterinary clinic
- Faculty of Law Science: department of law science
- Faculty of Engineering: departments of civil engineering, mechanical engineering, chemical engineering, electrical engineering, architecture, mining engineering, industry engineering and geophysics engineering.
- Faculty of Agriculture: departments of cultivation agronomy, soil science, animal husbandry product, post-harvest technology, agricultural engineering, agribusiness agricultural socioeconomics, and pest and plant disease.
- Faculty of Teacher Training & Education: Social sciences education — departments of civic education, history education, economics education, and language education; Mathematics and natural science education — departments of biology education, physics education, mathematics education, and chemistry education; Technology and vocational education — departments of family welfare education, physical & health recreation education, and art education
- Faculty of Medicine Education: department of general physician education
- Faculty of Mathematics & Natural Science: departments of mathematics, physics, chemistry, biology, informatics, statistics, and pharmacy
- Faculty of Social and Political Science Communication: departments of communication, sociology, and politics
- Faculty of Marine & Fishery Aquacultural: departments of aquaculture, and marine science
- Faculty of Dentistry : Department of Dentistry
- Faculty of Nursing

=== Graduate programs ===
- Faculty of Economics: master's degrees and doctoral degrees in development studies, management and accounting
- Faculty of Veterinary Science: master's degree for veterinary clinic
- Faculty of Law Science: master's degree for law science
- Faculty of Engineering: master's degree for civil engineering, mechanical engineering, and chemical engineering
- Faculty of Agriculture: master's degrees for natural resource conservation
- Faculty of Teacher Training & Education: master's degrees for management education, English education, language and Indonesian and local languages literature education, physical and health education
- Faculty of Mathematics & Natural Science : master's degree for Mathematics, Physics, Chemistry, and Biology
- Faculty of Medicine Education: master's degree for surgery science
- Faculty of Agriculture: master's degree for Agroecotechnology

== Notable alumni ==
- Azriana Manalu, women's rights activist and lawyer

== See also ==
- SMA Labschool Unsyiah
