= Mustafa Abubakar =

Indonesian politician

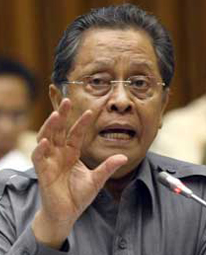

5th Ministry of State-Owned Enterprises
- In office 22 October 2009 – 19 October 2011
- President: Susilo Bambang Yudhoyono
- Preceded by: Sofyan Djalil
- Succeeded by: Dahlan Iskan

Personal details
- Born: 15 October 1949 (age 76) Pidie Regency, Nanggroe Aceh Darussalam, Indonesia
- Education: Institut Pertanian Bogor

Mustafa Abubakar (born 15 October 1949) is an Indonesian politician and formerly governor of the province of Aceh. Mustafa was appointed to become Minister of State-Owned Enterprises in the Second United Indonesia Cabinet, which was announced on 21 October 2009 following the re-election of Susilo Bambang Yudhoyono. Mustafa was brought into the cabinet after reforming the Indonesian Bureau of Logistics (Bulog), whose previous chairman, Widjanarko Puspoyo, had been involved in a corruption scandal.

Mustafa Abubakar spent his childhood in Meureudu, the capital of the Pidie Jaya Regency in Aceh. He was educated in the Fisheries and Marine Science Faculty of The Bogor Agricultural University (Institut Pertanian Bogor/"IPB") and served as the chairman of the student council at IPB. After graduating in 1977 he worked as an agricultural consultant before joining the fisheries and maritime affairs ministry. In 2005 he was appointed the governor of his home province of Aceh after the previous governor, Abdullah Puteh, was indicted on corruption charges.

Mustafa held the position of governor of Aceh for just over one year throughout 2006 (30 December 2005 to 8 February 2007). The period was an important one for Aceh. The major aid effort following the Asian tsunami of December 2004, in which about 170,000 people in Aceh died, was underway. In addition, the key Memorandum of Understanding signed in Helsinki in August 2005 to establish peace in the province after nearly 30 years of internal conflict was being implemented. There was therefore a great deal of interest, both from within Indonesia and abroad, in the management and governance of the province. The main events of his time in office are recorded in Berani tidak popular: Mustafa Abubakar memimpin Aceh masa transisi (Dare to be unpopular: Mustafa Abubakar's leadership of Aceh in a time of transition). He was succeeded as governor by Irwandi Yusuf who had formerly held positions in Free Aceh Movement.

Mustafa was appointed the Chairman of the Indonesian Bureau of Logistics in March 2007 following the indictment of Widjanarko.

== Career as Minister of State Enterprises ==
In 2010, Mustafa sought to resurrect a controversial plan to improve ties with Iran by investing in an Iranian fertiliser factory.
