= Irwandi Yusuf =

Indonesian politician (born 1960)

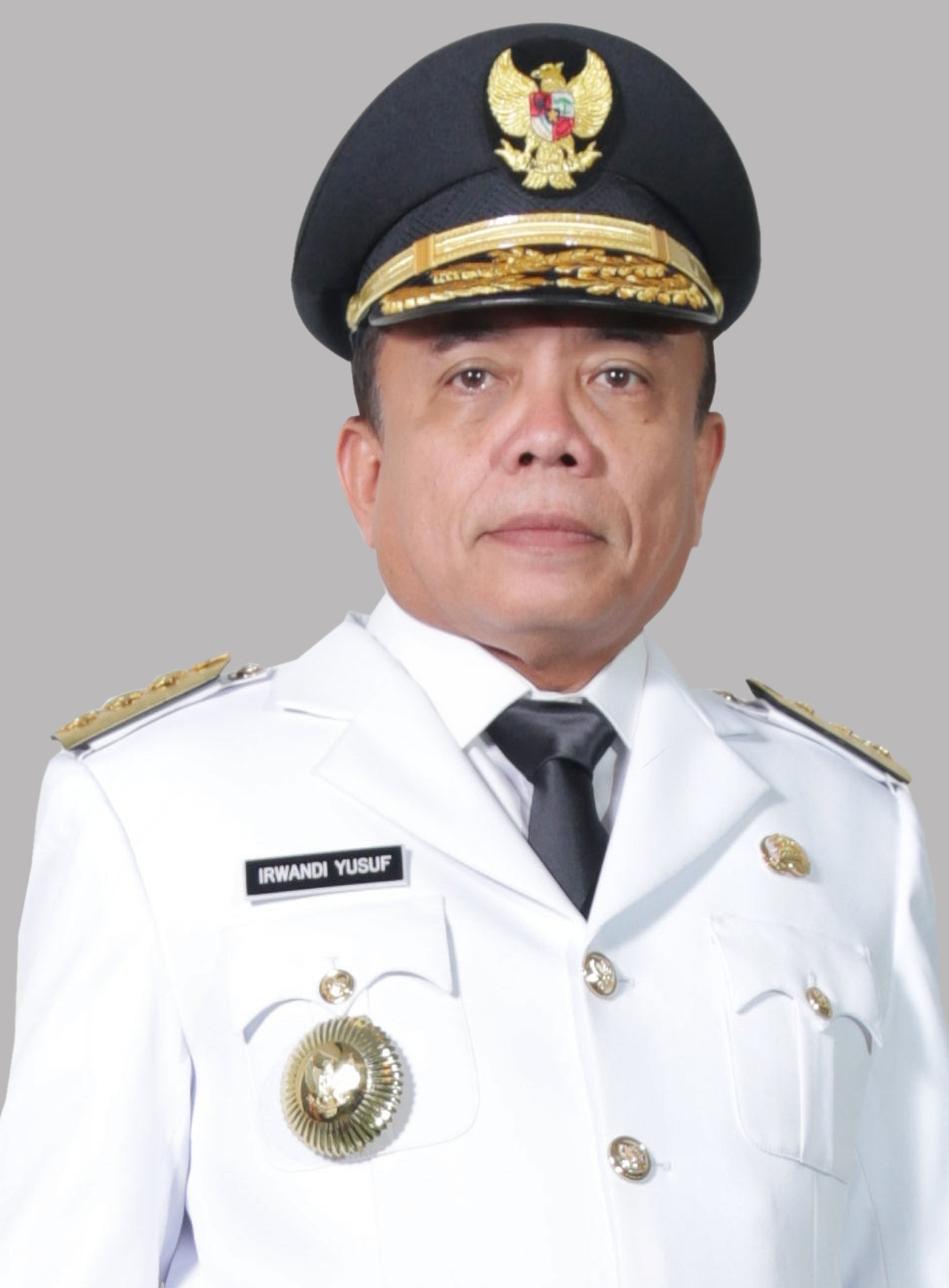
- Yusuf in 2017

16th Governor of Aceh
- In office 5 July 2017 – 15 October 2020 (Note: Inactive 5 July 2018–15 October 2020 due to corruption cases. The position is filled by Nova Iriansyah as Acting Governor of Aceh)
- Deputy: Nova Iriansyah
- Preceded by: Zaini Abdullah
- Succeeded by: Nova Iriansyah
- In office 8 February 2007 – 8 February 2012
- Deputy: Muhammad Nazar
- Preceded by: Mustafa Abubakar
- Succeeded by: Zaini Abdullah

Personal details
- Born: 2 August 1960 (age 66) Bireuën, Aceh, Indonesia
- Party: Aceh Nanggroe Party
- Education: Syiah Kuala University; Oregon State University
- Profession: Veterinarian

Irwandi Yusuf (born 2 August 1960) is an Indonesian politician politician, academic, veterinarian, and former activist with the Free Aceh Movement (GAM). He served as the 11th and 13th Governor of Aceh, making history as the first former GAM combatant to hold the office. He began his professional career as a lecturer at Syiah Kuala University's Faculty of Veterinary Medicine after completing his degree there in 1987.

Irwandi joined GAM in 1990. Throughout the Insurgency in Aceh from 1990 to 2001, he served as Special Staff to the GAM Central Command, using various aliases while working as a propagandist and strategist. On 23 May 2003, he was arrested by Indonesian authorities and sentenced to nine years' imprisonment for treason at Keudah Prison in Banda Aceh. He managed to escape during the 2004 Indian Ocean earthquake and tsunami, subsequently fleeing to Europe.

Following the 2005 Helsinki Peace Agreement, Irwandi served as a spokesperson for GAM. Irwandi first won a term as governor in the 2006 Aceh regional election as an independent candidate (non-party). Muhammad Nazar was his running mate in 2006. During his first term (2007–2012), he enacted key regional policies, including the universal Aceh Health Insurance (Jaminan Kesehatan Aceh) program and a logging moratorium.

However Irwandi lost his 2012 re-election campaign to Zaini Abdullah following a strong challenge and intensive campaigning by other local political rivals. Allegations that he may have wrongfully granted land concessions of protected high conservation value land to palm oil companies also surfaced before the election. Following the 2012 election, he founded the Aceh National Party.

In 2017, he was reelected as the Governor of Aceh, with Nova Iriansyah as his partner. On the next year, Irwandi was arrested along with Bener Meriah Regent Ahmadi and eight other individuals on corruption charges. On 8 April 2019, Yusuf was sentenced to seven years in prison for accepting bribes from Ahmadi totaling Rp 1.05 billion (US$74,084) in exchange for granting number of infrastructure projects in the regency. He was also found to have accepted Rp 8.7 billion in gratuities from businessmen during his two terms as governor.

== Early life and education ==
He was born in Bireuen Regency on 2 August 1960. He began his primary education at Madrasah Ibtidaiyah Negeri (State Islamic Elementary School) Cot Bada from 1967 to 1973. Afterward, he attended junior high school at Madrasah Tsanawiyah (Islamic Junior High School) Bireuen Regency until 1976. Following his secondary education, he continued his studies at the Animal Husbandry Vocational High School Saree until 1979.

In 1987, he graduated from the Faculty of Veterinary Medicine at Syiah Kuala University. Later, in 1989, he received a scholarship to the Oregon State University to pursue a Master's degree in veterinary medicine. He graduated in 1993 with a thesis titled "Antigenic comparison of bovine, ovine, equine, and llama adenoviruses." Following his master's graduation, he served as a lecturer at USK until 2007. During his tenure as lecturer, Irwandi became a founding member of the branch of the Fauna and Flora Preservation Society in Aceh before he was arrested for treason. He also joined International Committee of the Red Cross in 2001 to learn about humanitarian law to teach Free Aceh Movement soldier.

== Free Aceh Movement ==
MOU between Indonesia and Free Aceh Movement

He joined the Free Aceh Movement in 1990 and was appointed Special Staff for Central Military Command from 1998 to 2001. During his involvement, he was known as a propaganda expert and used aliases such as Teungku Agam and Isnandar. His involvement ended when he was arrested by police in Jakarta during negotiations facilitated by the Henry Dunant Center in 2003. Subsequently, he was sentenced to nine years in prison on charges of treason. He was then imprisoned at the Keudah Penitentiary.

While in prison, Irwandi continued to communicate with GAM using a mobile phone he hid in his crotch. In July 2004, he attempted to escape from prison but aborted the plan, fearing that his associates would kill a prison guard who had become his friend. A second attempt failed in November 2004. Ultimately, following the 2004 Indian Ocean earthquake and tsunami, he escaped in January 2005. Before the tsunami struck, he had recognized the signs and warned his fellow inmates. When he and his colleagues tried to flee, the prison’s front gate had been locked because the guards feared the prisoners would escape. As the water began to rise inside the prison, Irwandi fled to a prayer room on the second floor while the surrounding walls collapsed. The water rose until it reached the ceiling; however, because the ceiling was made of asbestos, he broke through it to climb onto the roof. Three days after escaping from prison, he visited his mother in Bireun before traveling to Jakarta and eventually settling in Europe. Out of 278 inmates, Irwandi was one of only 40 survivors.

Following the Helsinki Agreement on August 15, 2005, Aceh pledged to hand over all 840 of its weapons to the Aceh Monitoring Mission in four stages from September 15 to December 2005. In exchange, the Indonesian government promised to withdraw non-local military forces from the Aceh region. Throughout this process, Irwandi consistently served as the spokesperson for the organization.

== Political career ==
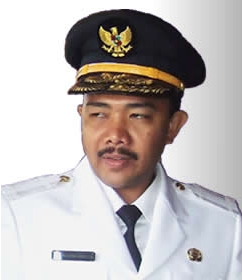
Muhammad Nazar, Vice Governor of Aceh 2007-2012

=== Aceh's governor 2007-2012 ===
In the 2006 Aceh Gubernatorial Election, he ran as an independent candidate alongside Muhammad Nazar, securing 38.20% of the vote (768,745 out of 2,012,307 valid votes). He outperformed seven other candidate pairs, including Ahmad Humam Hamid with Hasbi Abdullah, Malik Raden with Sayed Fuad Zakaria, Azwar Abubakar with Nasir Jamil, Iskandar Hoesin with Saleh Manaf, Tamlicha Ali with Harmen Nuriqmar, Ghazali Abbas Adan with Salahuddin Alfata, and Djali Yusuf with Syauqas Rahmatillah. He took office on 8 February 2007.

On his government, he worked with the army that once pursued him as a Free Aceh Movement rebel and also kept much of the old administration in place although he also moved to reform a range of positions in the senior ranks of the provincial public service. In a 2007 New York Times interview, Irwandi said, "I tell them, 'I believe, I trust you all. You are all trustworthy until you prove otherwise. Then I will know.'" In the same interview, he remarked that his former enemies in the cabinet were welcome to 'rock and roll' with him – "Rock and roll... That means to do something new, rocky, that was never felt before. It is spirit. Spirited people. Young blood. Young spirit."

One of Irwandi's declared priorities was the protection of Aceh's rainforest. "This is my obsession, since a long time ago – that Aceh is Aceh, and the forests of Aceh need to be kept well." Additionally, he declared a logging moratorium in 2007, followed by the implementation of carbon offsets through the REDD program scheme. This program was subsequently funded by Merrill Lynch. He personally drove out to villages to conduct spot inspections of former logging camps, encouraging the locals to take up sustainable new professions. Following the moratorium, the 2011 Tangse flash floods occurred, and Irwandi blamed illegal logging as the cause of the disaster.

On August 25, 2011, he granted a land conversion concession for palm oil plantations to PT Kallista Alam, covering 1,605 hectares of peatland. This move was eventually challenged in a lawsuit filed by The Indonesian Forum for Environment (WALHI) at the Banda Aceh Administrative Court. The area is located in Nagan Raya, which is part of the Rawa Tripa and the Leuser Ecosystem. Furthermore, this action faced legal validity issues, as it was deemed a violation of the moratorium on peatland conversion issued by Government of Indonesia.

In response, Irwandi stated, "I feel very sorry for that. It was not wrong legally but wrong morally." According to him, he took this action to draw global attention to the world's inability to address climate change and to provide financial support for those affected by the moratorium. He even threatened to revoke the moratorium entirely. Additionally, he denied that any orangutans died in the fires, despite a statement from Ian Singleton, Conservation Director of the Sumatran Orangutan Conservation Programme, who noted that ten orangutan nests could be found within 20 minutes of the location, estimated to be inhabited by 100 to 300 orangutans. During his leadership, he also initiated the Jaminan Kesehatan Aceh, a regional social health insurance program. His term end on 8 February 2012.

=== Aceh gubernatorial election in 2012 ===
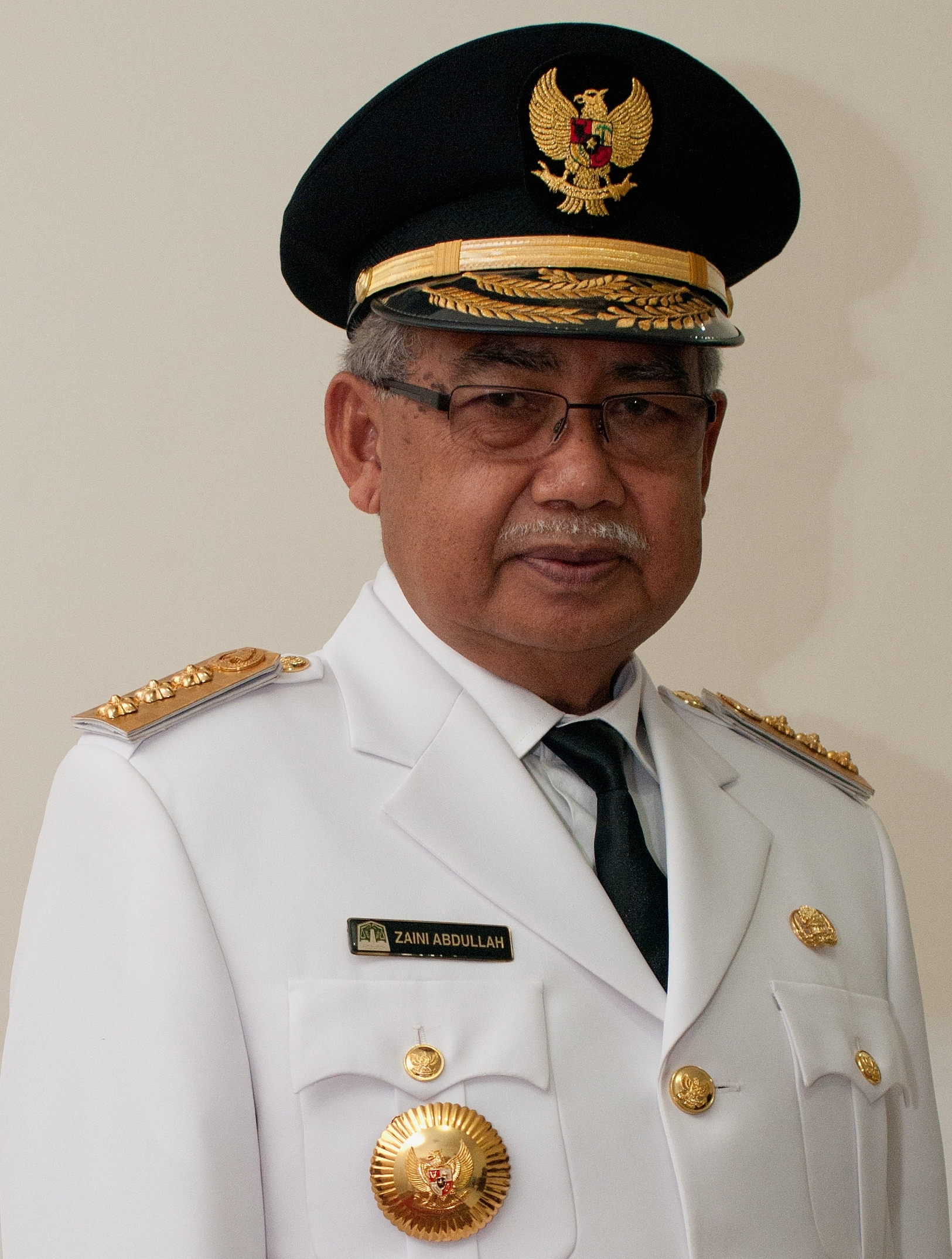
Zaini Abdullah, Governor of Aceh 2012-2017

On 9 April 2012, Irwandi lost the re-election campaign that would have allowed him to continue as governor of Aceh to Zaini Abdullah. He was running the election with Muhyan Yunan through the independent route, but lost after obtaining 694,515 votes, or 29.18 percent of the total vote that was defeated by candidate that was endorsed by the Aceh Party, Zaini Abdullah and Muzakir Manaf. Subsequently, he filed a lawsuit with the Constitutional Court of Indonesia regarding allegations of election fraud, but the petition was rejected by the Court. Irwandi also claimed voter fraud and voter intimidation was the cause of his loss.

Despite a guarantee from Muzakir Manaf that Irwandi's safety would be guaranteed if he attended the inauguration of the new provincial government in June 2012, Irwandi was surrounded and beaten in the face and head by uniformed Aceh Party supporters after the event. He stated that the attack was caused by the Aceh Party's campaign accusations that he was a traitor to the Free Aceh stemming from his negotiations and compromises with the Indonesian government and his own governorship campaign in 2006 as an independent candidate.

=== Aceh's governor 2017-2018 ===
After losing in the previous election, he ran again in 2017 alongside Nova Iriansyah, supported by the Aceh National Party (PNA), the National Awakening Party (PKB), and the Aceh Abode Party. Then, this candidates was elected on February 25, 2017, with 898,710 votes, surpassing the tallies of Muzakir and TA Khalid (766,427 votes), Tarmizi Abdul Karim and Teuku Machsalmina Ali (406,865 votes), Zaini and Nasaruddin (167,910 votes), Zakaria Saman and Teuku Alaidinsyah (132,981 votes), and Abdullah Puteh and Sayed Mustafa Usab Al Idroes (41,908 votes). PNA, their nominating party, changed its name to the Partai Nanggroe Aceh on May 6, 2017. They were officially inaugurated as Governor on July 5, 2017, by Tjahjo Kumolo.

== Corruption charges ==
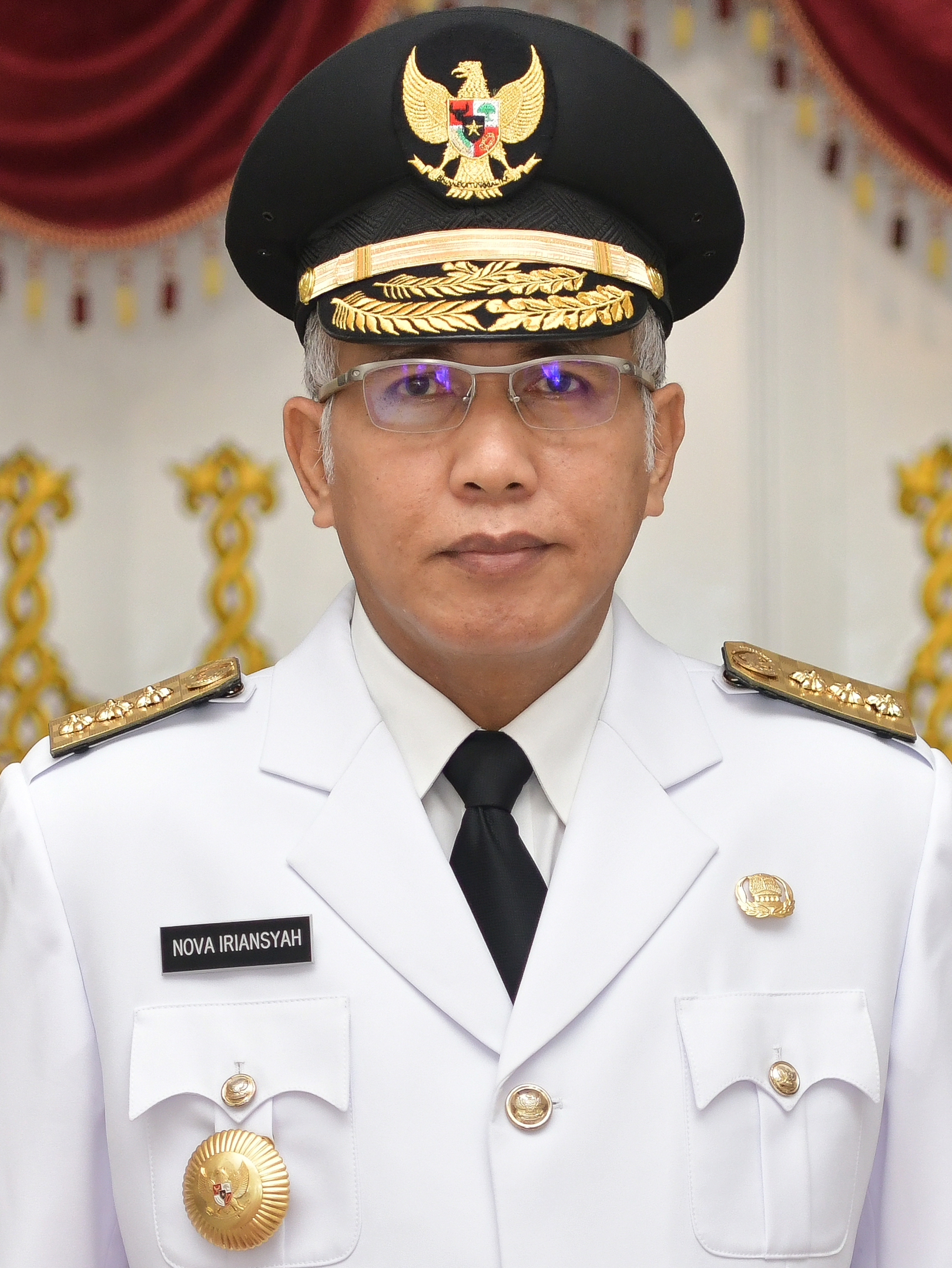
Nova Ariansyah,vice governor of Aceh 2017-2018

In July 2018, he was arrested by the Corruption Eradication Commission, after allegedly having been caught red-handed receiving bribes. He was sentenced to seven years' prison on 8 April 2019, and upon appeal his sentence was increased to eight years. The Supreme Court of Indonesia reset his sentence to seven years on 13 February 2020. He was released on parole in October 2022. He remained the chairman of the Aceh Nanggroe Party during his sentence, and upon his parole he resumed his political activities. Irwandi was arrested along with Bener Meriah Regent Ahmadi and eight other individuals following a suspicious transaction involving provincial and regency officials, according to the Corruption Eradication Commission (KPK). Since Irwandi was caught red-handed by the KPK, he started to lose supports from Acehnese people.

== Personal life ==
He married Darwati A. Gani on March 22, 1995, and they divorced on July 30, 2024. They have five children from this marriage. Additionally, he married Steffy Burase on December 8, 2017. This marriage faced administrative hurdles as it had not yet received permission from Darwati, leading Steffy to announce their separation on December 11, 2023. After Irwandi's divorce from Darwati was finalized, Irwandi and Steffy officially registered their marriage under state law on February 8, 2025. He is also known for his hobby of piloting a Shark Aero aircraft as his primary mode of transportation for official visits.
