= Muhammad Nazar =

Indonesian politician

Muhammad Nazar, S.Ag. (born 1 July 1973 in Ulim, Pidie Jaya Regency, Nanggroe Aceh Darussalam), is the former deputy governor of the province of Aceh, Indonesia He held office during 2007-2012 having been elected in the 2006 Acehnese regional elections along with Irwandi Yusuf who was elected governor.

Muhammad Nazar was a lecturer in the IAIN Ar-Raniry (Institut Agama Islam Negeri Ar-Raniry or the Ar-Raniry State Islamic Religious Institute) in Banda Aceh until his election as deputy governor in 2006 and former head of Acehnese Referendum Information Centre.

Muhamad Nazar stood for governor in the Acehnese gubernatorial election in 2012 but was unsuccessful.
