= Acehnese people =

Ethnic group in Indonesia

Ureueng Acèh, Ureuëng Atjèh اورڠ اچيه
- Alam Peudeueng

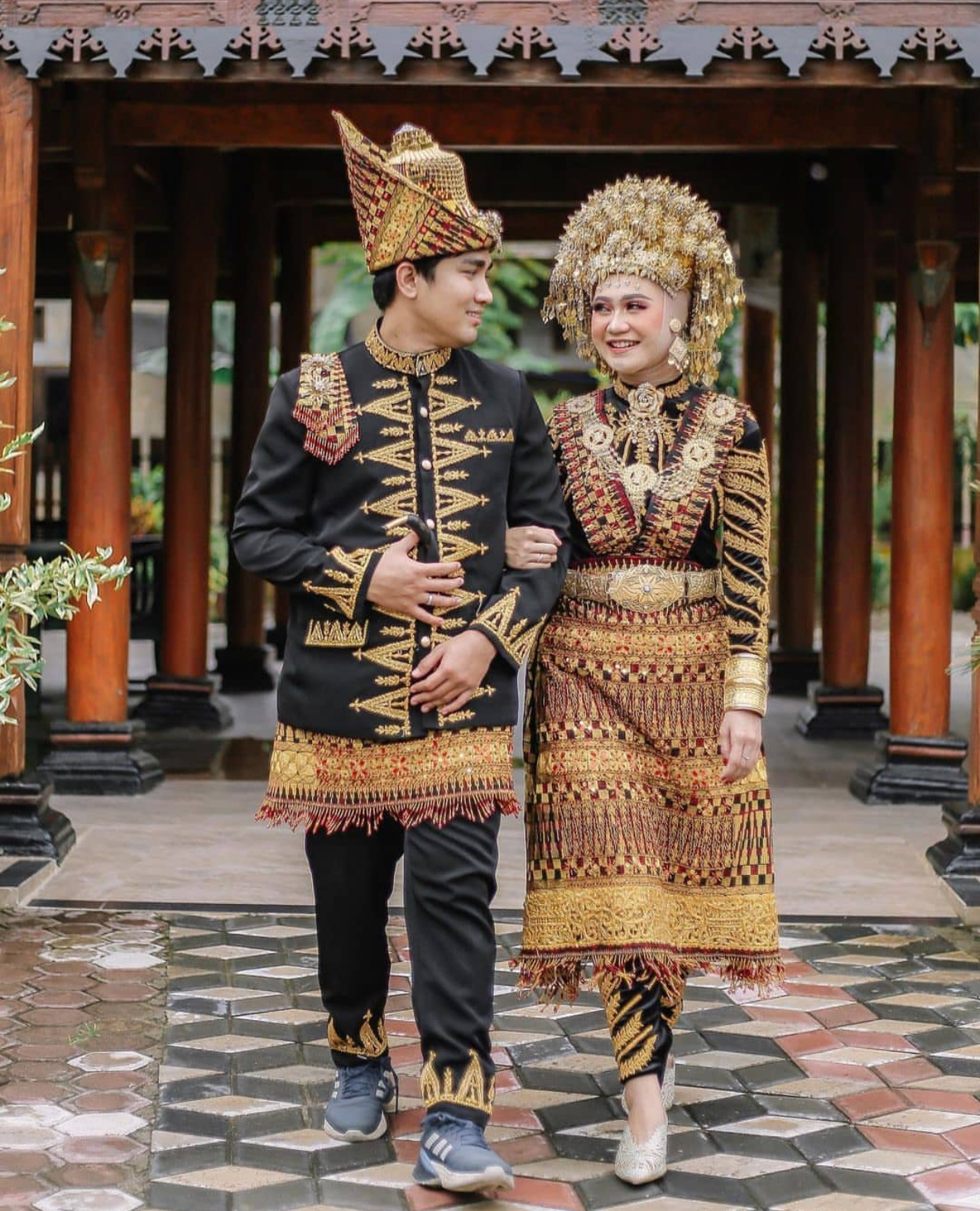
- An Acehnese bride and groom in traditional wedding dresses

Total population
- 3,526,000 – 4,200,000

Regions with significant populations
- Aceh (Indonesia): 3,404,000 (2010); 3,484,000 (2015)
- Malaysia: 640,000

Languages
- Native: Acehnese; Dialects: North Aceh, Pidie, Daya, Great Aceh, West Aceh; Also: Indonesian, English, Malay (Kedahan), Arabic (religious only)

Religion
- Sunni Islam

Related ethnic groups
- Austronesian peoples; Cham; Gayo; Malay; Minangkabau

The Acehnese (Note: /ˌɑːtʃəˈniːz/ AH-chə-NEEZ) (Acehnese: Ureueng Acèh [uˈrɯ(ə̯)ŋ aˈcɛh], Husaini: Ureuëng Atjèh, Jawoe: اورڠ اچيه; Indonesian: Orang Aceh), also written as Achinese, are an Austronesian ethnic group native to Aceh, a province on the northernmost tip of the island of Sumatra in Indonesia. The area has a history of political struggle against the Dutch colonial rule. The vast majority of Acehnese people are Muslims. The Acehnese people are also referred to by other names such as Lam Muri, Lambri, Akhir, Achin, Asji, A-tse and Atse. Their language, Acehnese, belongs to the Aceh–Chamic group of Malayo-Polynesian of the Austronesian language family.

For a time, the Acehnese were partially Hinduised, as evident from their traditions and the many Sanskrit words in their language. Trade with the Islamic world resulted in the Islamization of the population and gradually displaced older religions practiced by the Acehnese. As a result, the Acehnese have been Muslims for many centuries. The estimated number of Acehnese ranges between 3,526,000 people to 4.2 million people.

Traditionally, Acehnese are agriculturists, metal-workers and weavers. Traditionally matrilocal, their social organisation is communal. They live in gampôngs, which combine to form districts known as mukims. The golden era of Acehnese culture began in the 16th century, along with the rise of the Islamic Aceh Sultanate and later reaching its peak in the 17th century. Generally, the Acehnese people are regarded as conservative adherents to the Islamic faith and also as militant fighters against the colonial conquest of the Portuguese Empire and the Dutch Empire.

Aceh came to international attention as being the hardest-hit region of the 2004 Indian Ocean earthquake with 120,000 people dead.

== Origins ==
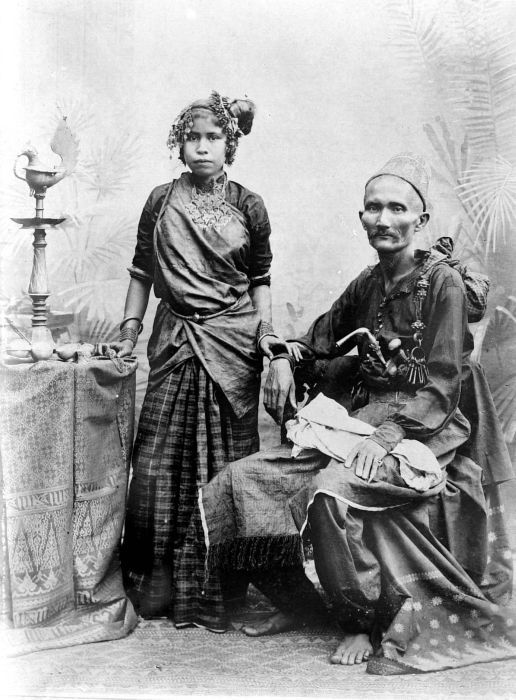
An Acehnese couple is seen with the man girded with a Rencong knife, circa 1939.

Archaeological evidence show that the earliest inhabitants of Aceh were from the Pleistocene age, where they lived in the west coast of Aceh (Langsa and Aceh Tamiang Regency region) and exhibited Australomelanesoid characteristics. They mainly relied on a diet of seafood, including various types of shellfish, as well as land animals. The inhabitants are known to have used fire and practiced rituals of burial.

The migration of the modern-day indigenous tribes, such as the Mante people and the Lhan people (Proto-Malay), as well as the Chams, Malays and Minangkabau people (Deutero-Malay) who arrived later, formed the pribumi dwellers of Aceh. Foreign ethnic groups, especially Indians, as well as a small amount of Arabs, Persians, Turks, and Portuguese also compromise the ancestry of the Acehnese people. The strategic position of Aceh in the northern tip of the Sumatra island for thousands of years has allowed the region to become a haven for trade and inter-marriage of various people groups, namely those involved in the sea trade route from the Middle East to China.

=== Native Southeast Asian peoples ===
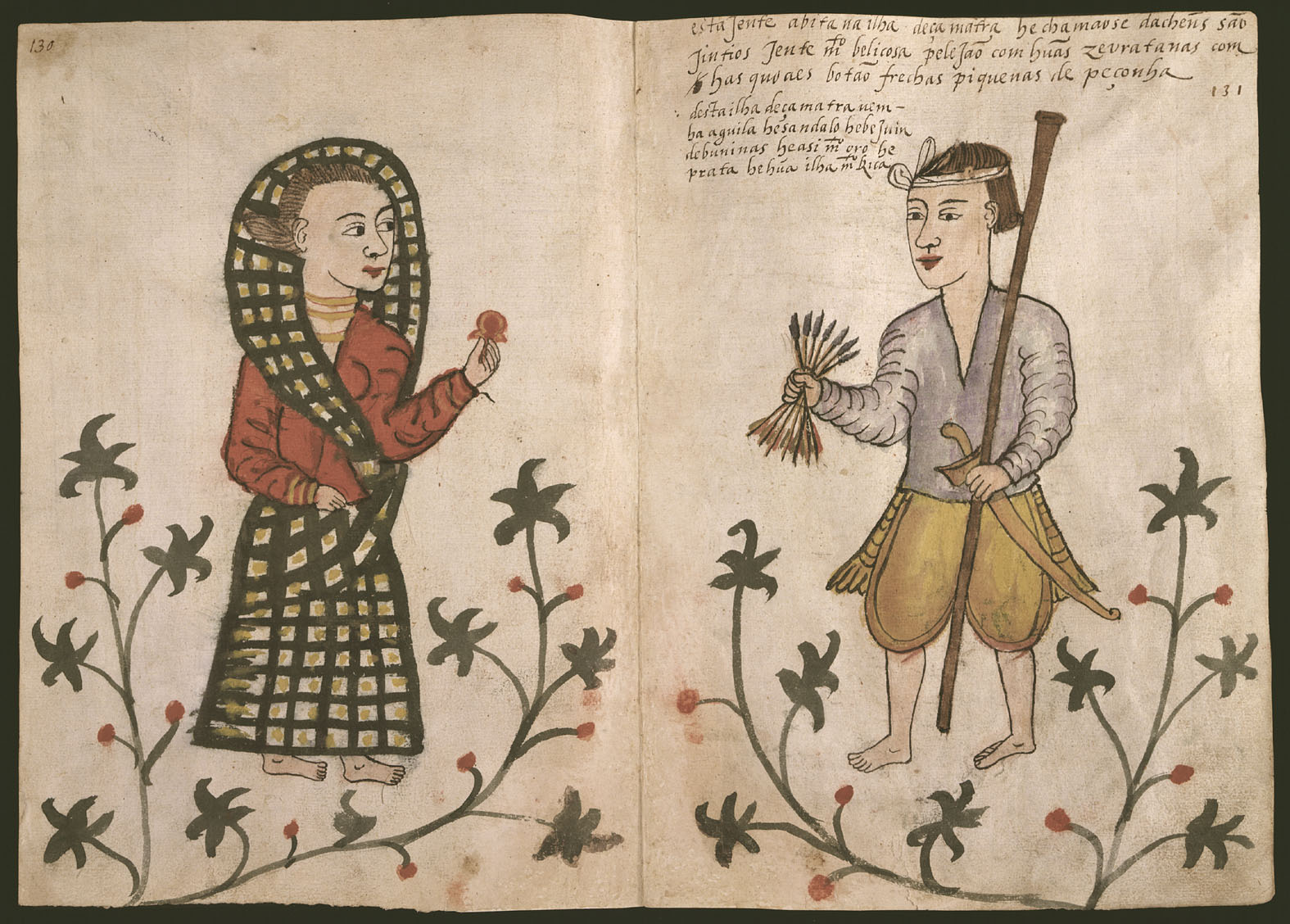
Anonymous 1540 Portuguese illustration from the Códice Casanatense, depicting Acehnese. The inscription reads: "People that inhabit the island of Sumatra called Acehnese, they are gentiles, very warlike people who fight with blowguns with which they shoot small poisoned arrows; from this island of Sumatra hails sandalwood, benzoin, and much gold and silver, it is a very rich island."

Linguist Paul Sidwell wrote that "Sometime during this early phase of language shift, perhaps before the beginning of Common Era, the Chamic speakers who were to become the Acehnese left the mainland on a journey that would ultimately end in northern Sumatra." Using Graham Thurgood's thesis, Sidwell argues that the Acehnese likely had been separated from Chamic-speaking peoples around the first to second century BCE. The geographic gap between other Chamic languages and Acehnese may have led to influence on Indochinese speakers of Chamic languages from Malay, Khmer, Thai, and Vietnamese over the following two thousand years.

Chinese and Indian sources from 500 CE and onward mention that there was a settlement in northernmost Sumatra (Aceh) which was called P'o-lu. Many scholars believe that P'o-lu was close to the what is now Banda Aceh. These sources also state that the average person wore cotton clothing while the ruling elite wore silk. The Chinese annals also claim that the local people were Buddhist.

Acehnese folklore states that the earliest people of Aceh came from indigenous tribes such as the Mante people and the Lhan people. The Mante people were a local native group believed to be related to the Batak, Gayonese and Alas people, while the Lhan people are allegedly still related to the Semang people group who had migrated from the Malay Peninsula or Indochina (specifically Champa and Burma). Initially, the Mante people settled in Aceh Besar Regency and later began to spread to other regions.

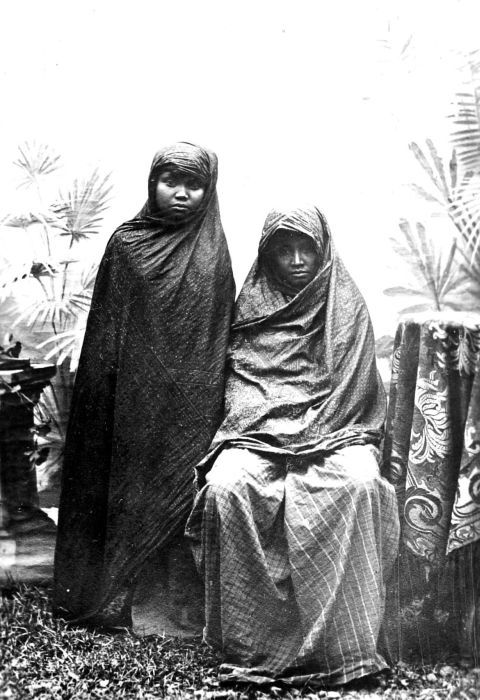
Wife and sister of Panglima Polem in Great Aceh

Around the ninth and tenth century there was an influx of Arabian and Persian merchants to the Aceh region. When Marco Polo visited the area in 1292, he mentions that some of the port cities and towns had already converted to Islam. It is commonly thought that when the Samudera Pasai Sultanate was founded, Islam was fully established in the region. Nonetheless, it is clear that Islam was a major religion in and around Aceh by the thirteenth century.

During the decline of the Srivijaya kingdom, it is estimated that a number of Malay people began to migrate to Aceh. They then settled down in the valleys of Tamiang River and later became known as the Tamiang people. After they were conquered by the Samudera Pasai Sultanate kingdom (1330), only then did they begin to integrate into Acehnese society; although in terms of cultural and linguistic, there are still similarities with the Malay culture. By the sixteenth century, Aceh was an important cultural and scholastic Islamic center influential throughout much of Southeast Asia.

Most of the Minangkabau people who migrated to Aceh settled around Meulaboh and Krueng Seunagan valley. Generally in these fertile areas they manage wet paddy fields and pepper farming, as well as some trading. The mixed population of Acehnese-Minangkabau people is also found in the southern region, namely in the areas around Susoh, Tapaktuan and Labuhan Haji. There are many who converse daily in both Acehnese language and their own native dialect, the Aneuk Jamee language.

As a result of the political expansion and diplomatic relations of the Aceh Sultanate with their surrounding region, the Acehnese people were also mixed with the Alas people, Gayonese, Karo people, Nias people and Kluet people. The unification of the Acehnese culture that stemmed from various ancestry are primarily in the Acehnese language, religion of Islam and the local customs, as how it was formulated by Sultan Iskandar Muda in the Adat Makuta Alamlaws, which is well known as "Kanun Mahkota Alam".

=== India ===
There are many of those who are of Indian descent in Aceh, which are closely linked to trading and the spreading of Hinduism-Buddhism and Islam in Aceh. Those who are of Indian descent are mainly Tamils and Gujarati people which are found spread throughout the entire Aceh. Among some of the Indian people's influence on the Acehnese people includes the cultural aspects and physical attributes of part of the Acehnese people, as well as the variety in Acehnese cuisine that frequently utilizes curry. Numerous place names of Sanskrit origin (for example, Indrapuri, Aceh Besar) reflects the cultural heritage of Hinduism in the past.

=== Arab, Persia and Turkey ===
"The tribe of the Three Hundred is (insignificant) as the seeds of the drang (a bush which grows like a weed along fences);
The people of the clan Ja Sandang are even as anise and cummin (thus a little more valuable).
Those of the Ja Batèe (count) for something;
The Imeum Peuet it is which makes the world to tremble."

— Oral poem (hadih maja) from
Snouck Hurgronje's De Atjeher''.

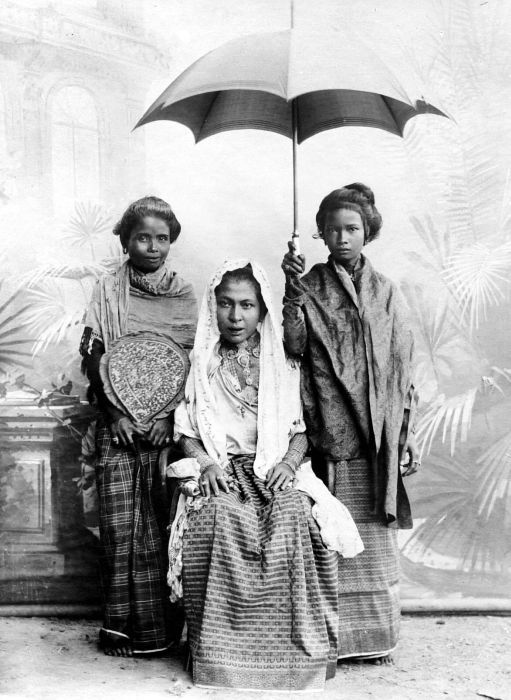
Wife of last Sultan of Aceh, Alauddin Muhammad Daud Syah II

Most of the Arabs that migrated to Aceh came from Hadhramaut, Yemen. Among the immigrants are those of the Ba Alawi including al-Aydrus (Aidrus, Aydarus), al-Attas, al-Kathiri, Badjubier, Sungkar, Bawazier & al-Habsyi and other clans; all of which are Arabic clans that originated from Yemen. They came as ulamas to spread Islam and as traders. Seunagan district for an instance, is well known to this today for numerous of ulamas of the Sayyid descent, of which the local community would address them with the title Teungku Jet or Habib as a form of respect. Similarly, some of the Sultan of Aceh are also descendants of Sayyid. Many of their descendants today have intermarried with the natives Acehnese people and do no longer bear their clan names.

There are also those of Persian descent that generally came to spread religion and to trade, while those of Turkish descent generally were invited as ulamas, weapon merchants, military trainers and soldiers of war for the Aceh Sultanate. At present, people of Persian and Turkish descent in Indonesia are mostly scattered in Aceh Besar Regency. Names of Persian and Turkish heritage are still being used by Acehnese people to name their children. In fact, the word Banda in the name of Banda Aceh city is also a word of Persian language in origin (Banda means "port").

=== Portugal ===
People of Portuguese descent are found mainly in the Aceh Jaya Regency (northwest section of Aceh). Portuguese sailors under the lieutenant leadership of Captain Pinto, were sailing towards Malacca, stopped by and traded there; where some of them remained and settled there. History records that this event occurred between 1492 and 1511; of which at that time the area was under the rule of a small kingdom called Lamno, with King Meureuhom Daya as their ruler. Until this day, some of their descendants can still be seen with European features.

== Language ==
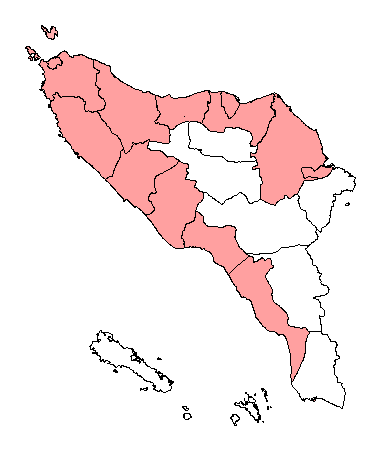
Regencies area of which the Acehnese language is spoken in Aceh.

Acehnese belongs to the Chamic languages, a branch of the Malayo-Polynesian languages from the Austronesian languages. Languages that are closely related with Acehnese are Cham, Roglai, Jarai, Rade, Chru, Tsat, as well as other Chamic languages that are spoken in Cambodia, Vietnam and Hainan. There are also loanwords from Mon-Khmer languages, many of which are shared with other Chamic languages and had already been borrowed in the Proto-Chamic, the ancestral proto-language of all Chamic languages. Other Mon-Khmer loanwords are only found in Acehnese, which suggests that after the split from the Chamic core area, the forebears of the Acehnese people might have lived in the Malay Peninsula or Southern Thailand where they picked up these loanwords from neighboring Mon-Khmer speakers before migrating to Sumatra. Vocabulary of the Acehnese language have been enriched by absorption from Sanskrit and Arabic language, especially in the field of religion, laws, governance, warfare, arts and knowledge. For centuries, the Acehnese language have also absorbed a lot from the Malay language.

Speakers of Acehnese.

Initially, a group of Chamic languages migrant speakers controlled a small region only, namely Banda Aceh in Aceh Besar Regency. Marco Polo (1292) states that Aceh at that time consists of 8 smaller kingdoms, with each of them possessing their own language. The expansion of power on other coastal kingdoms, especially Pidie, Pasai and Daya, and absorption of their population over time in a period of 400 years, eventually made the language of the Banda Aceh population became dominant in the coastal region of Aceh. Other native languages speakers were then forced into the interior by the expansion of land for farming by the Acehnese language speakers.

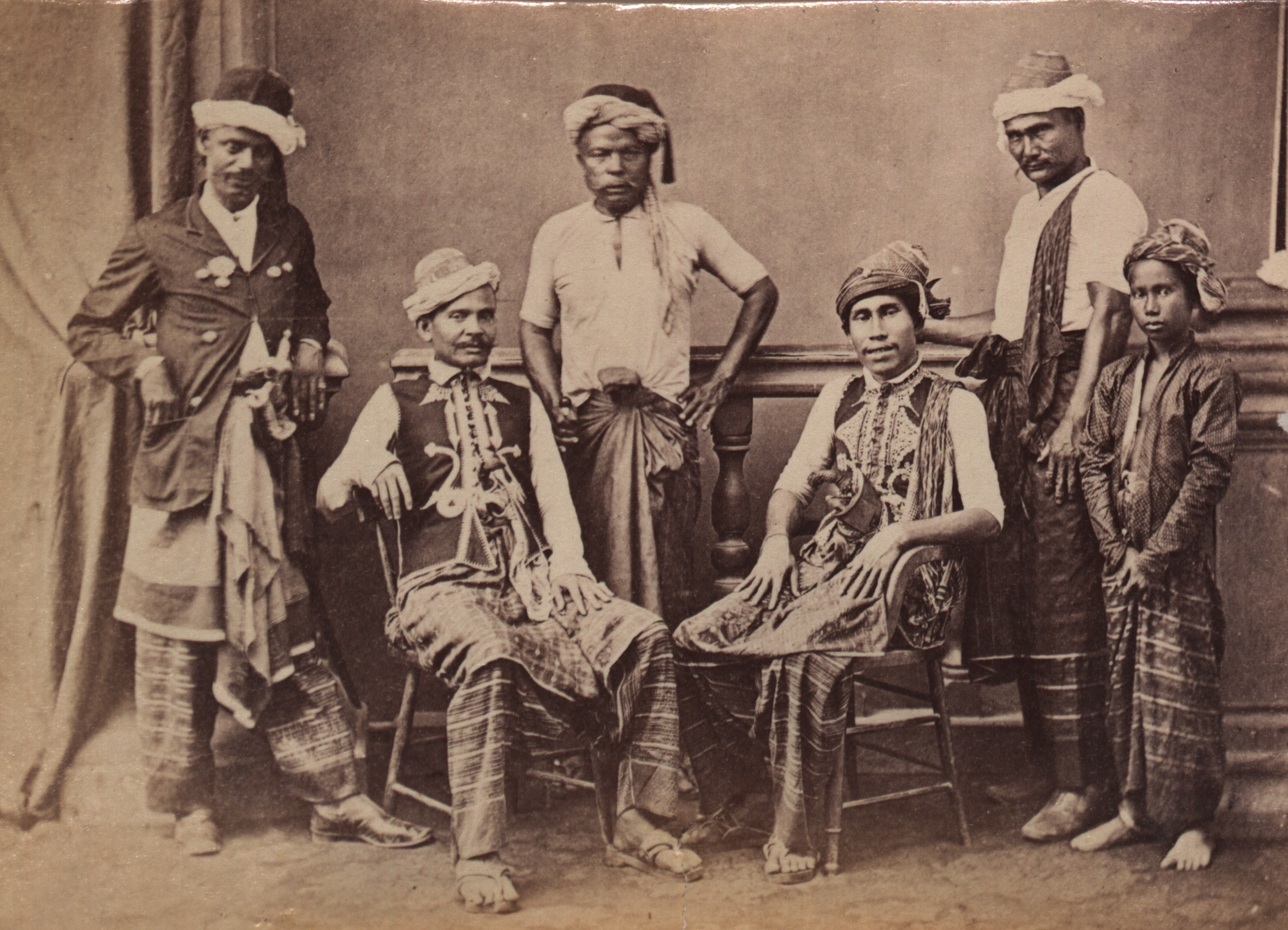
Heads of Aceh at Singapore. Standing at the left: Teukoe Kali. Standing, 2nd from the right: Moekims. Sitting at the left: Panglima dalem. Sitting at the right: Strabander of Atjeh

Dialects of the Acehnese language that are found in the Aceh Besar Regency valley are divided into two major groups, namely the Tunong dialect for dialects in the highlands and Baroh dialect for dialects in the lowlands. Most of the dialects that are used in Aceh Besar Regency and Daya, shows that settlements in that region have existed longer than any other regions. There are also many dialects in Pidie Regency, although not as much as in Aceh Besar Regency and Daya. Dialects on the east coast of Pidie Regency and in southern Daya tend to be more homogeneous, so much so that it is co-related with the migration that came along with the expansion of power of the Aceh Sultanate after the 1500s.

Local government of Aceh, among others through Governor's Decree No. 430/543/1986 and Perda No. 2 of 1990 established the Institute of Acehnese Customary and Culture (Lembaga Adat dan Kebudayaan Aceh, LAKA), with the mandate to develop the customs and norms of the communities and customary institutions in Aceh. Indirectly, this institution protects the preservation of the Acehnese language because in every cultural and customary activity, the delivery of such activities is carried out in the Acehnese language. Likewise, the Acehnese language is also commonly used in everyday affairs that are organized by government agencies in Aceh.

== Culture ==
=== Dances ===
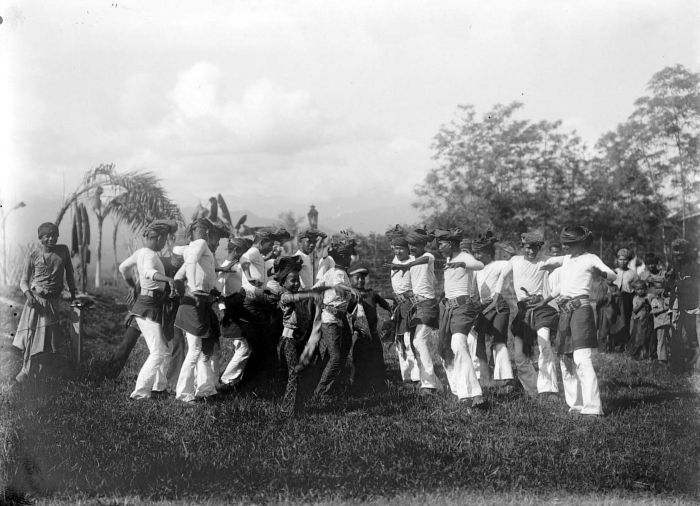
Seudati dance performed at Samalanga, Bireun, Aceh, 1907.

Traditional Acehnese dance portrays the heritage culture, religion and folklore of the common folk. Acehnese dance are generally performed in groups, either in a standing or sitting position, and the group of dancers are of the same gender. If seen from the musical standpoint, the dance can be grouped into two types. One is accompanied with vocals and physical percussive movements of the dancers themselves, and the other is simply accompanied by an assemble of musical instruments.

- Laweut
- Likok Pulo
- Pho (dance)
- Rabbani Wahed
- Ranup lam Puan
- Rapa'i Geleng
- Rateb Meuseukat
- Ratoh Duek
- Seudati
- Tarek Pukat
- Saman

=== Traditional cuisine ===
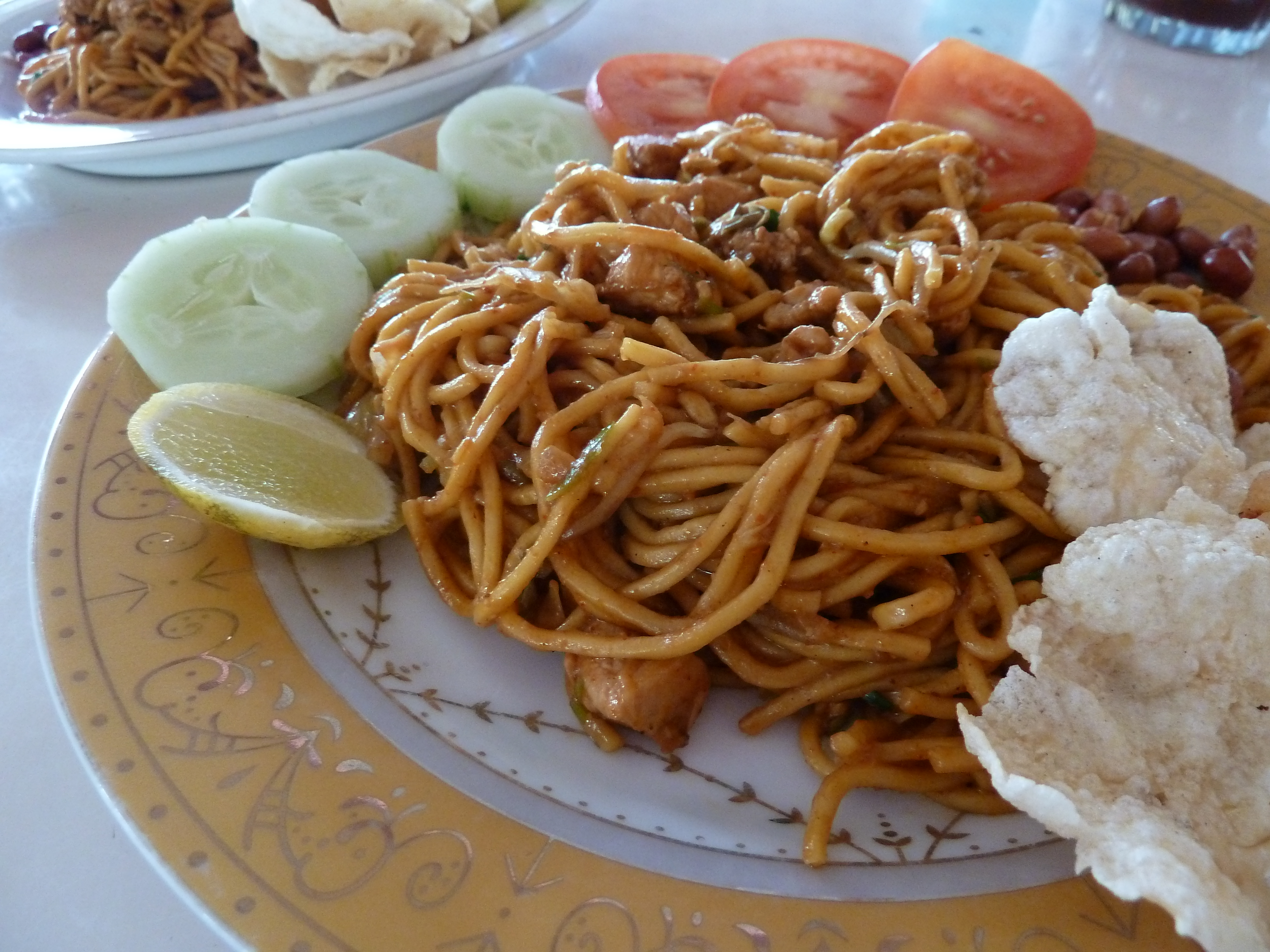
Mie Aceh, Acehnese fried noodles

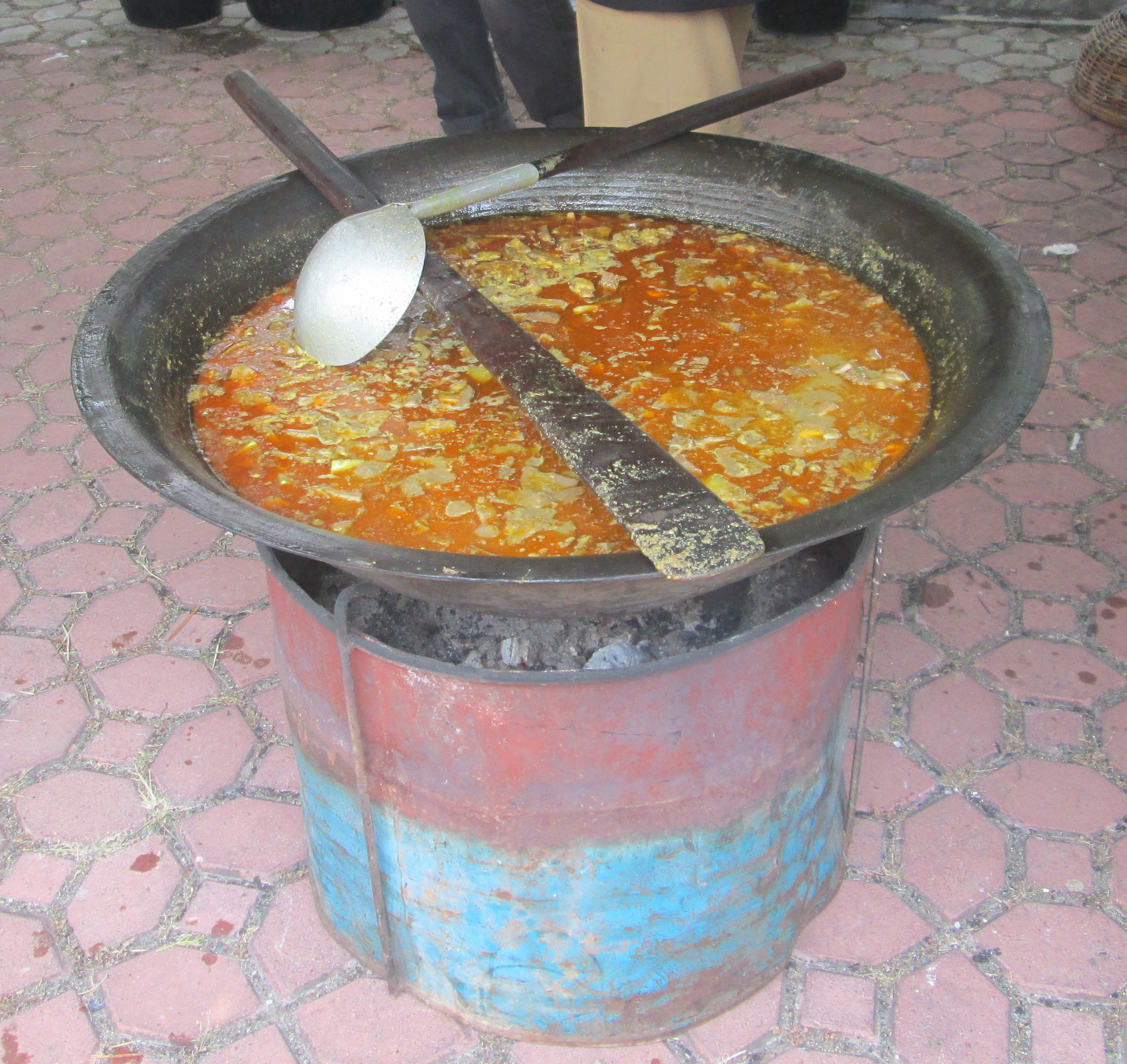
Kuah beulangong

Acehnese cuisine is known for its combination of spices just as are commonly found in Indian and Arabic cuisine, such as ginger, pepper, coriander, cumin, cloves, cinnamon, cardamom and fennel. A variety of Acehnese food is cooked with curry or curry and coconut milk, which is generally combined with meat such as buffalo, beef, mutton, fish, or chicken. Several types of traditional recipe use a blend of cannabis as a flavoring spice; such cases are also found in the cuisine of some other Southeast Asian countries, such as Laos. However today, those substances are no longer used.

- Ayam tangkap
- Bhoi
- Eungkot paya
- Kuwah eungkôt yèe
- Kuah beulangong
- Kanji rumbi
- Keumamah
- Kuwah pliëk-u
- Martabak aceh
- Masam keueueng
- Meuseukat
- Mie aceh
- Mie caluk
- Nasi gurih
- Roti cane
- Roti jala
- Sambai asam udeueng
- Sate matang
- Sie reuboh
- Sop sumsum
- Timphan

== Diaspora ==
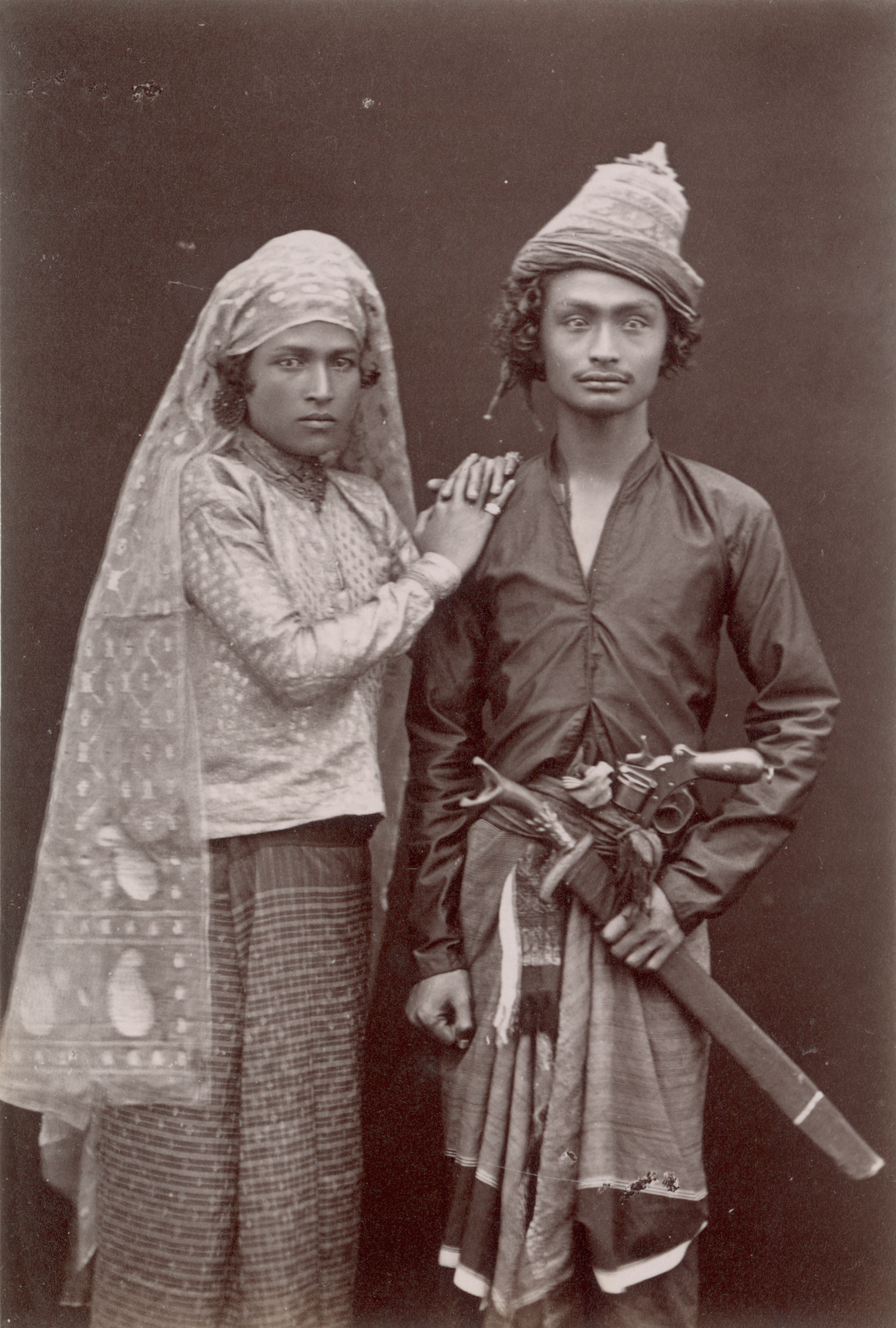
An Acehnese couple in Singapore with the man seen holding a Sikin Panyang cutlass, circa 1890.

Due to conflict after the Dutch invasion of Aceh, followed by Martial Law in Aceh during the attempt to break away from Indonesia, and the 2004 Indian Ocean earthquake, many Acehnese fled abroad. The most significant number of Acehnese can be found in Malaysia and Scandinavian countries, especially Sweden and Norway countries. Acehnese immigrants also can be found significantly in Australia, United States and Canada.

== Notable people ==
=== Indonesia ===
- Sultan Ali Mughayat Syah
- Sultan Iskandar Muda
- Sulṭāna Taj ul-Alam Safiatuddin Syah
- Sultan Alauddin Ibrahim Mansur Syah
- Sultan Alauddin Muhammad Da'ud Syah II
- Cut Nyak Dhien
- Nirina Zubir
- Cut Nyak Meutia
- Teungku Chik di Tiro
- Teuku Muhammad Hasan
- Teuku Umar
- Teuku Jacob
- Hasan di Tiro
- Admiral Keumala Hayati
- Sultan Malikussaleh
- Surya Paloh
- Dina Astita
- Illiza Sa'aduddin Djamal
- Beby Tsabina

=== Outside Indonesia ===
==== Malaysia ====
- Tengku Adnan Tengku Mansor
- P. Ramlee
- Hanafiah Hussain
- Sanusi Junid
- Badruddin Amiruldin

== See also ==
- Insurgency in Aceh
- Rumoh Aceh

== Notes ==
=== Bibliography ===
- Marwati Djoened Poesponegoro & Nugroho Notosusanto (2008), "Soejono (R. P.) & Richard Z. Leirissa", Sejarah nasional Indonesia: Zaman pertumbuhan dan perkembangan kerajaan-kerajaan Islam di Indonesia, Balai Pustaka, ISBN 97-940-7409-8
- Arndt Graf, Susanne Schroter & Edwin Wieringa, ed. (2010), Aceh: History, Politics and Culture, Institute of Southeast Asian Studies, ISBN 978-98-142-7912-3
- Anthony Reid (2006), Verandah of Violence: The Background to the Aceh Problem, NUS Press, ISBN 99-716-9331-3
- Christian Snouck Hurgronje (1906), The Achehnese, Brill Archive, OCLC 869439298
- Darrell T. Tryon (1995), "Shigeru Tsuchida", Comparative Austronesian Dictionary: An Introduction to Austronesian Studies, Bagian 1, Volume 1, Walter de Gruyter, ISBN 31-101-2729-6
