= Loke Chow Kit =

Malaysian businessman (1862–1918)

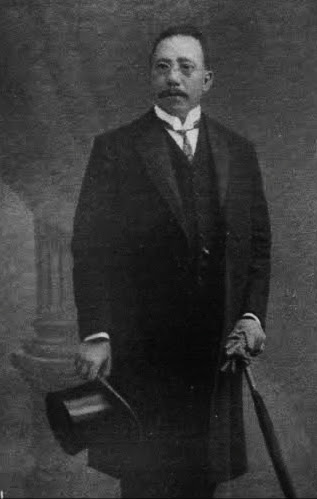
Loke Chow Kit circa 1908

Loke Chow Kit (Chinese: 陆秋杰 1862– 28 August 1918) was a Malayan business magnate and philanthropist, who founded the first department store in Kuala Lumpur.

== Early life ==
Loke Chow Kit, of Cantonese descent, was born in Penang, son of Loke Kum Choon, and educated at Penang Free School. After completing his education he joined Messrs. Katz Bros, Pinang, a German trading company based in Singapore. Later he moved to another trading company, Messrs. Huttenbach & Co., Penang, and was transferred to their Kuala Lumpur branch as assistant manager when it expanded its operations.

== Business career ==
His next position was in the employment of wealthy businessman Loke Yew which began a life-long association. Loke Yew and his partner, Chow Ah Yok, had the benefit of the government lease of the railway lines in Selangor, and Loke Yew appointed him traffic manager, a position which he held for several years until the lease term expired.

Following this, he held various positions in Loke Yew's business empire including at first in his general farm of Selangor, and then as general manager in his general and revenue farms of Pahang and Negeri Sembilan. In the following years, he became a partner with Loke Yew in many of his businesses which operated widely throughout the Federated Malay States and beyond, including as shareholder in the opium and spirit farms of Selangor and Malacca, and the opium farm of Hong Kong.

He was also a major participator in the tin mining industry, including as director and shareholder of the Milling and Mining Company, Ltd., and a major shareholder in the Jeher Hydraulic Tin Mining Company, Ltd., and the Serendah Hydraulic Tin Mining Company, Ltd, both of which he floated with his brother Loke Chow Thye. He also had directorships in the Malay Cement Company, Ltd., the Federal Dispensary Company, Ltd., and was also commercial agent for the China Mutual Life Insurance Company, Wee Bin Steamship Company, and Koe Guan Steamship Company.

In addition, he was an active member of the community serving on the boards of a number of public institutions and a donor to various charitable causes. He was president of the Straits Chinese Association and, acting president of the Weld Hill Club. He was Visiting Justice, and a member of the committee of the Tai Wah Hospital, member of the Kuala Lumpur Sanitary Board (today Kuala Lumpur City Hall), and member of the Selangor Anti-opium Society.

=== Loke Chow Kit and Co. ===
In 1905 Loke Chow Kit established the first department store in Kuala Lumpur under the name of Loke Chow Kit and Co., which was also the first to be owned and managed entirely by local interests. Situated on the corner of Holland Street (now Jalan Mahkamah Persekutuan) and Clarke Street (now Jalan Mahkamah) (3°8′52″N 101°41′41″E) behind the Sultan Abdul Samad Building, the three-storied block was described as "the handsomest edifice of its kind ever erected in Kuala Lumpur.”

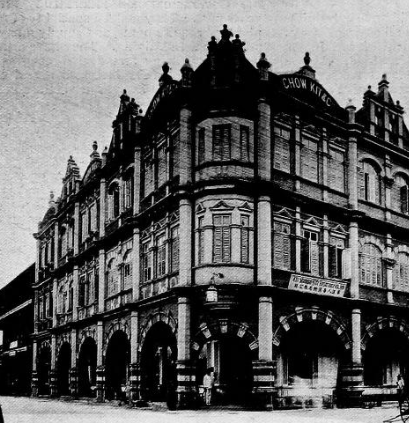
Chow Kit & Co. Main premises, Kuala Lumpur. c.1908

Established as a small store in 1892 with six staff, it grew into a large business with over 100 staff with numerous branches throughout the Federated Malay States selling a wide range of goods which included cars and motorcycles. The building has been preserved and is currently occupied by the Industrial Court.

== Personal life ==
Loke Chow Kit had four sons and nine daughters from two wives. Several of his children were educated in Scotland. He built and lived in the palatial mansion Loke Hall, and his country house, Desswood, both in Kuala Lumpur, and Mon Sejour situated on Penang Hill. He died on 28 August 1918 and was buried in Mount Erskine Cantonese cemetery in Penang.

Jalan Chow Kit, its surrounding district and MR10 monorail station in northern-central Kuala Lumpur, are named after him.
