= Chow Kit =

District in Federal Territory of Kuala Lumpur

Coordinates: 3°9′47.9″N 101°41′48.8″E

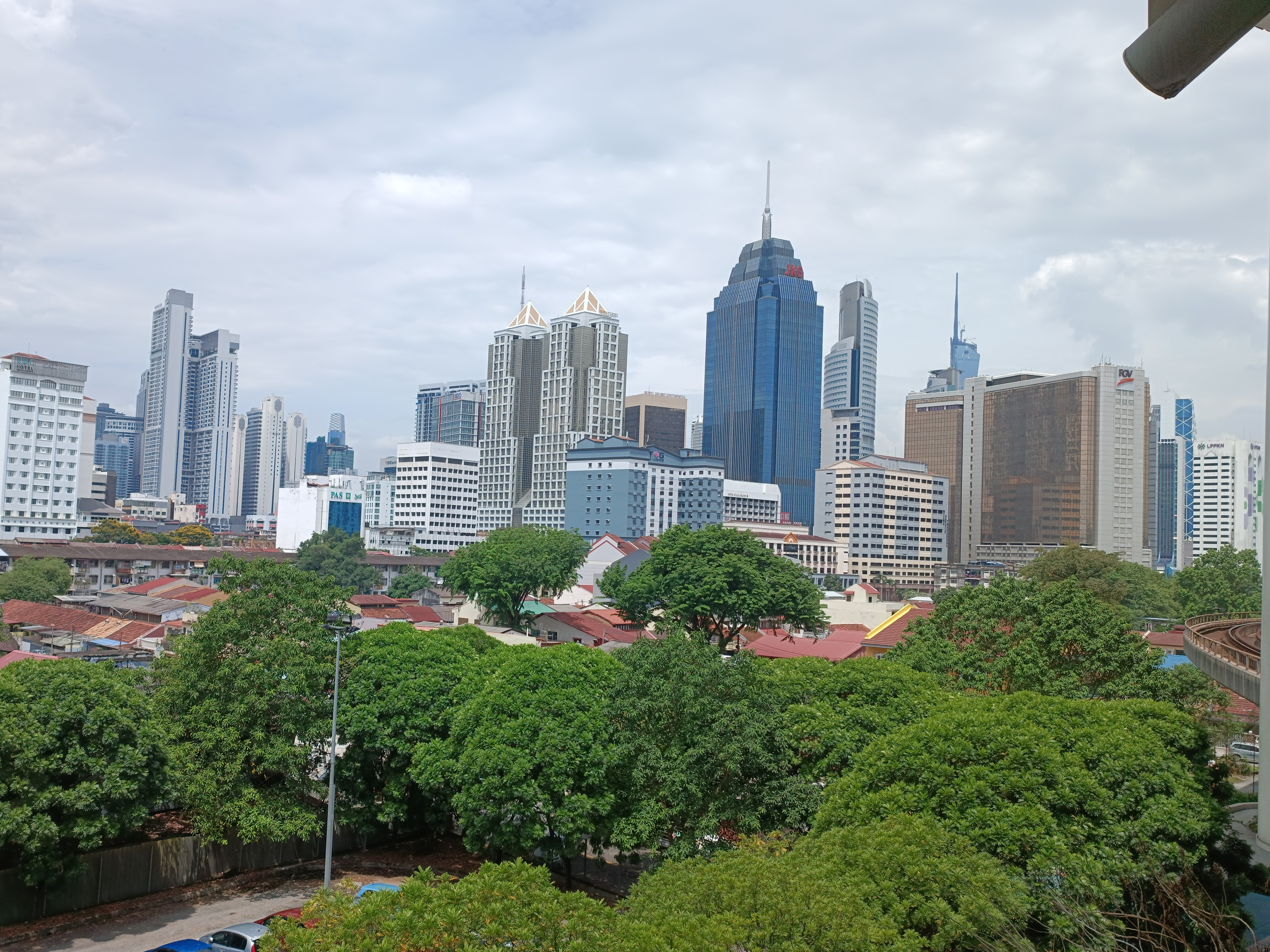
Jalan Tuanku Abdul Rahman in Chow Kit

Chow Kit is a suburb in central Kuala Lumpur, Malaysia. It is located around Jalan Chow Kit (Chow Kit Road) and is enclosed by the parallel streets of Jalan Raja Laut and Jalan Tuanku Abdul Rahman. It is named after Loke Chow Kit (Chinese: 陸秋傑; Jyutping: Luk6 Cau1 Git6; Pe̍h-ōe-jī: Lio̍k Chhiu-kia̍t) a well-known miner, municipal councilor, public official, and also the first local owner of a department store - Chow Kit & Co – which was the largest in KL at the time.

Today the area features a large Indonesian community and known as "Little Jakarta". The majority of Indonesia's Minangkabau, Javanese, and Acehnese open restaurants and as retailer. Recently, a small African community also lives there. There is a night market also known as Bundle Chow Kit along Lorong Haji Taib which is known for the sale of used clothing and accessories.

== Wet market ==
A daily wet market known as Bazaar Baru Chow Kit is the largest wet market in Kuala Lumpur, and a tourist attraction. A wide variety of fish and seafood products are available for customers.

== Red-light district ==
Chow Kit has traditionally been known as one of the major red-light districts in Kuala Lumpur. Many of the prostitutes are daughters of prostitutes that have grown up in the area. Malaysian director Justin Ong's 2013 film, Ida's choice, is about a young woman in the red-light district.

== Transportation ==
The KL Monorail Chow Kit Monorail station is situated in this area, while the PWTC LRT station (Ampang Line) and Hospital Kuala Lumpur MRT station (Putrajaya Line) are located nearby.

== In popular culture ==
- Chow Kit Road became the subject of the hit song, Chow Kit Road, made famous by the late Sudirman Arshad. Sudirman held an open-air concert on the road in 1986 to a 100,000-strong audience.

== Gallery ==
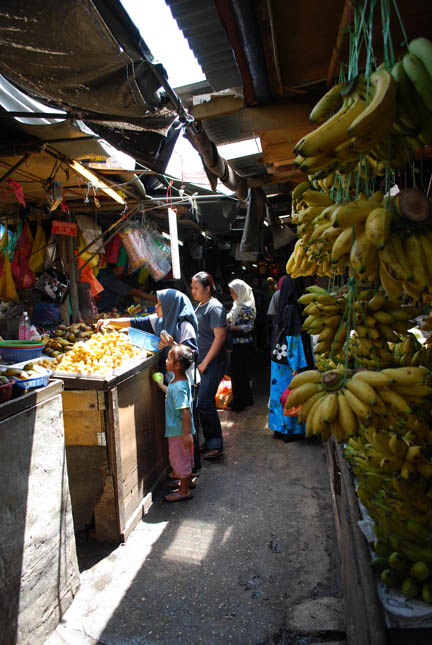
The wet market

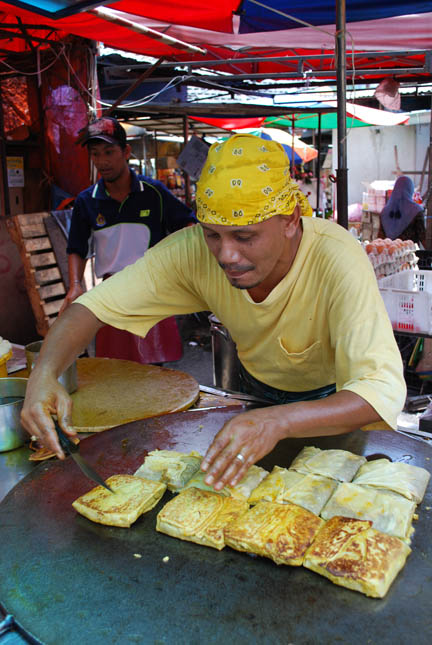
Murtabak (pancake) seller

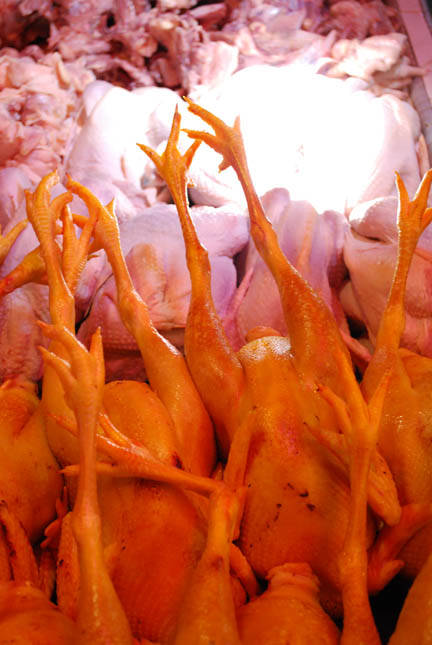
Chicken meat in Chow Kit

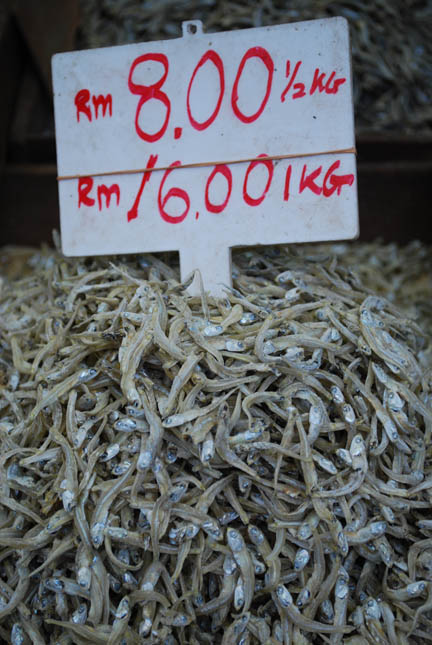
Small-sized anchovies in Chow Kit

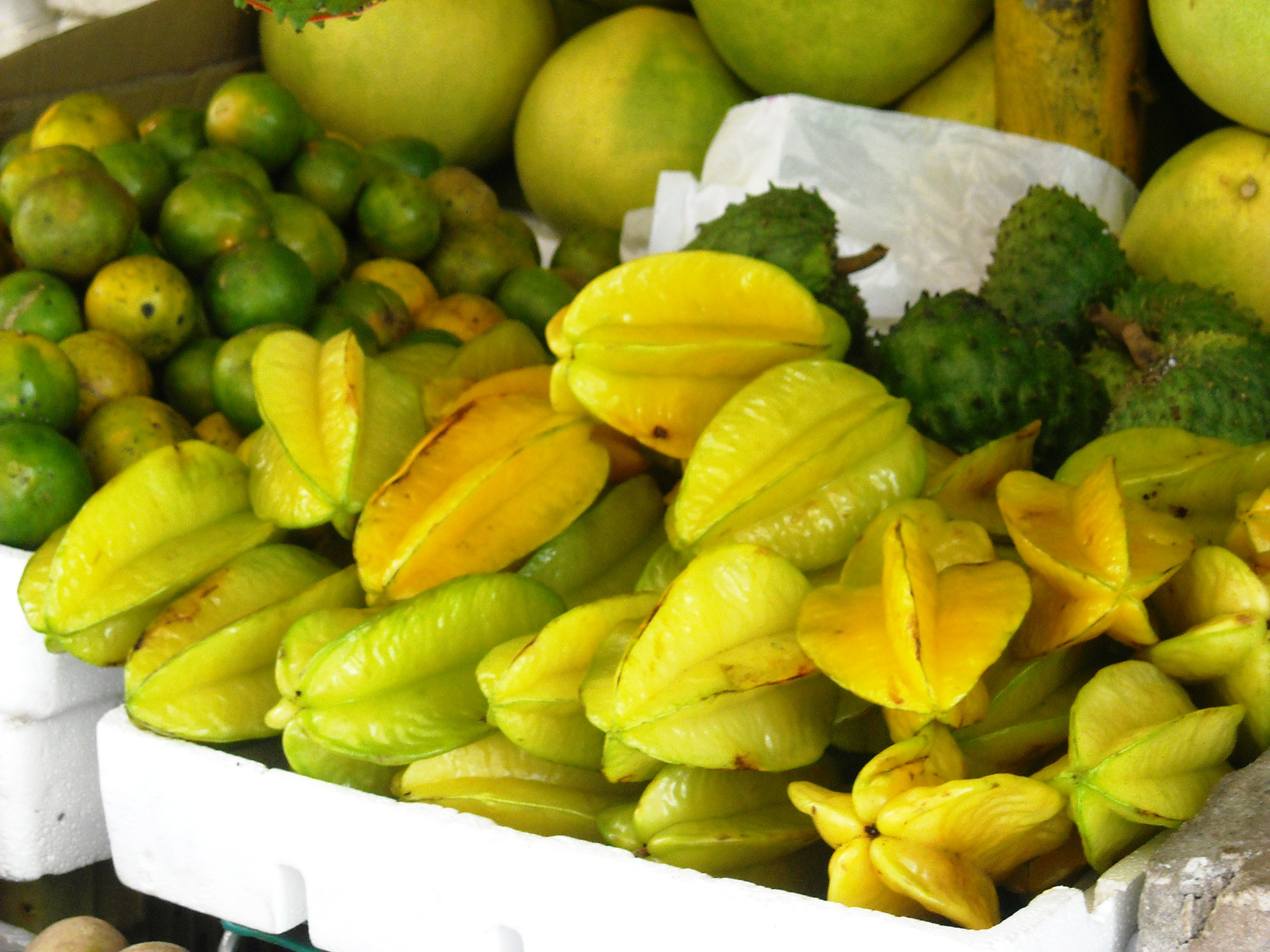
Carambola

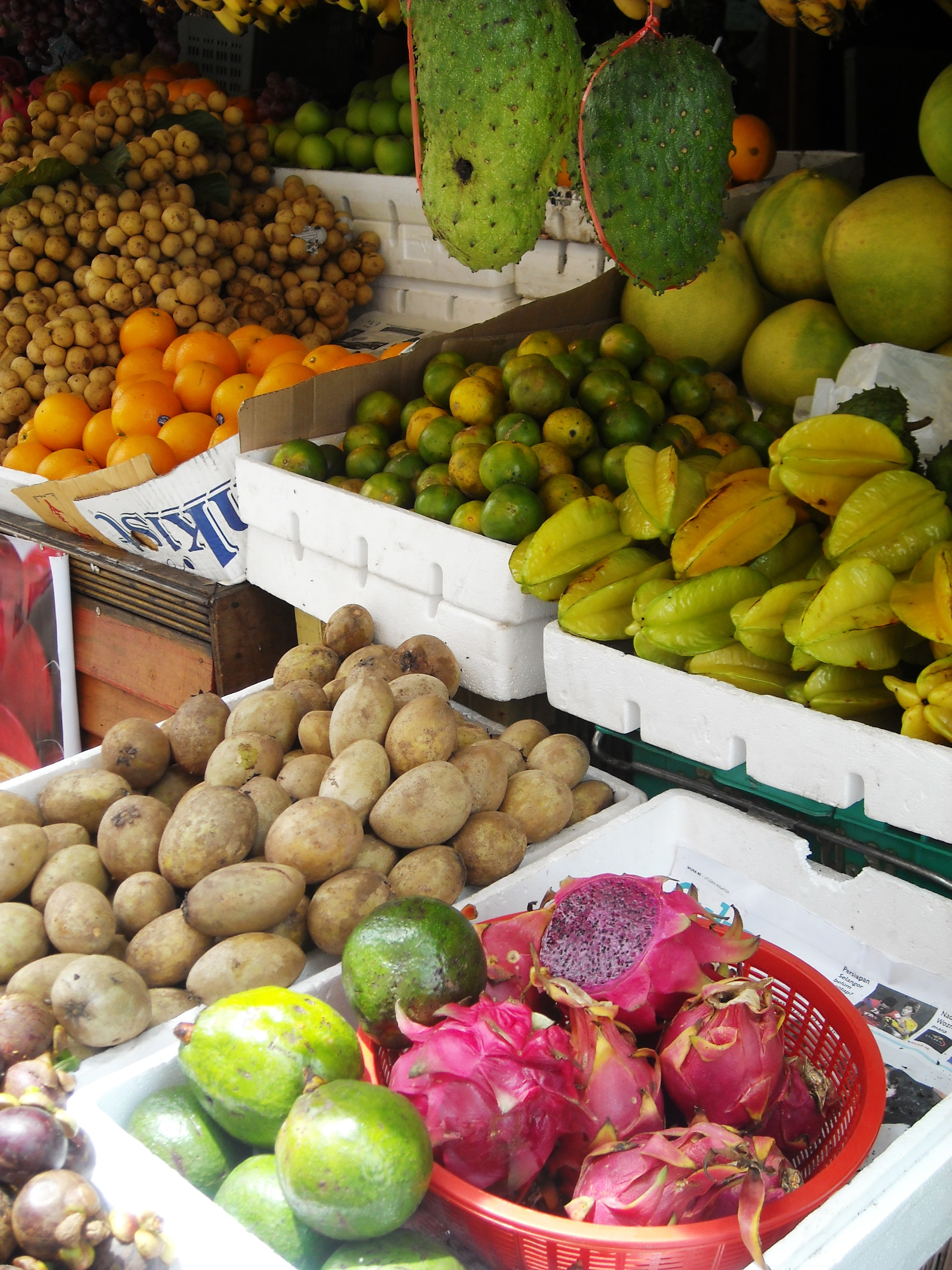
Dragon fruit

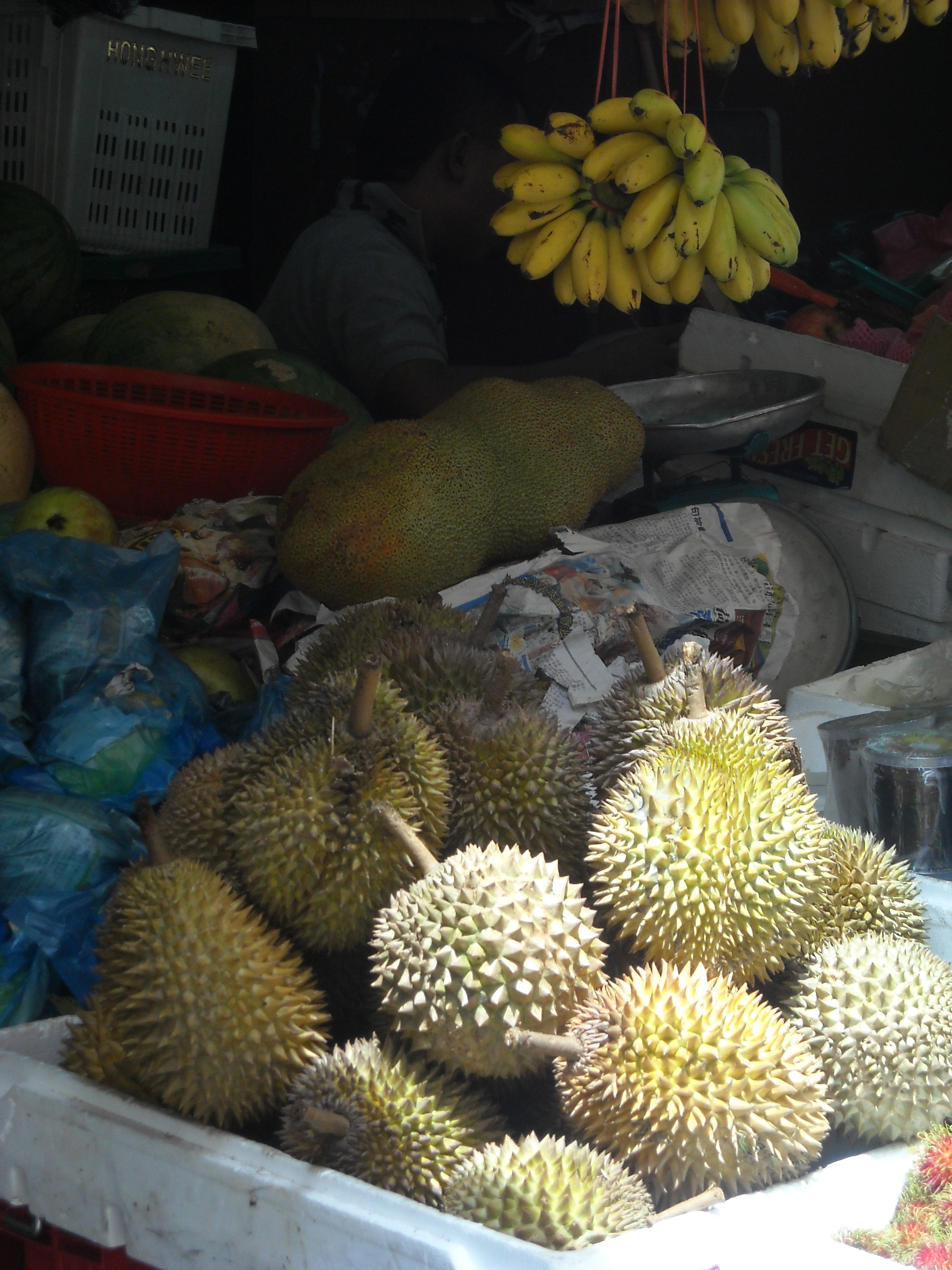
Durian
