= Pasar pagi =

Traditional morning wet market in Malaysia and Indonesia

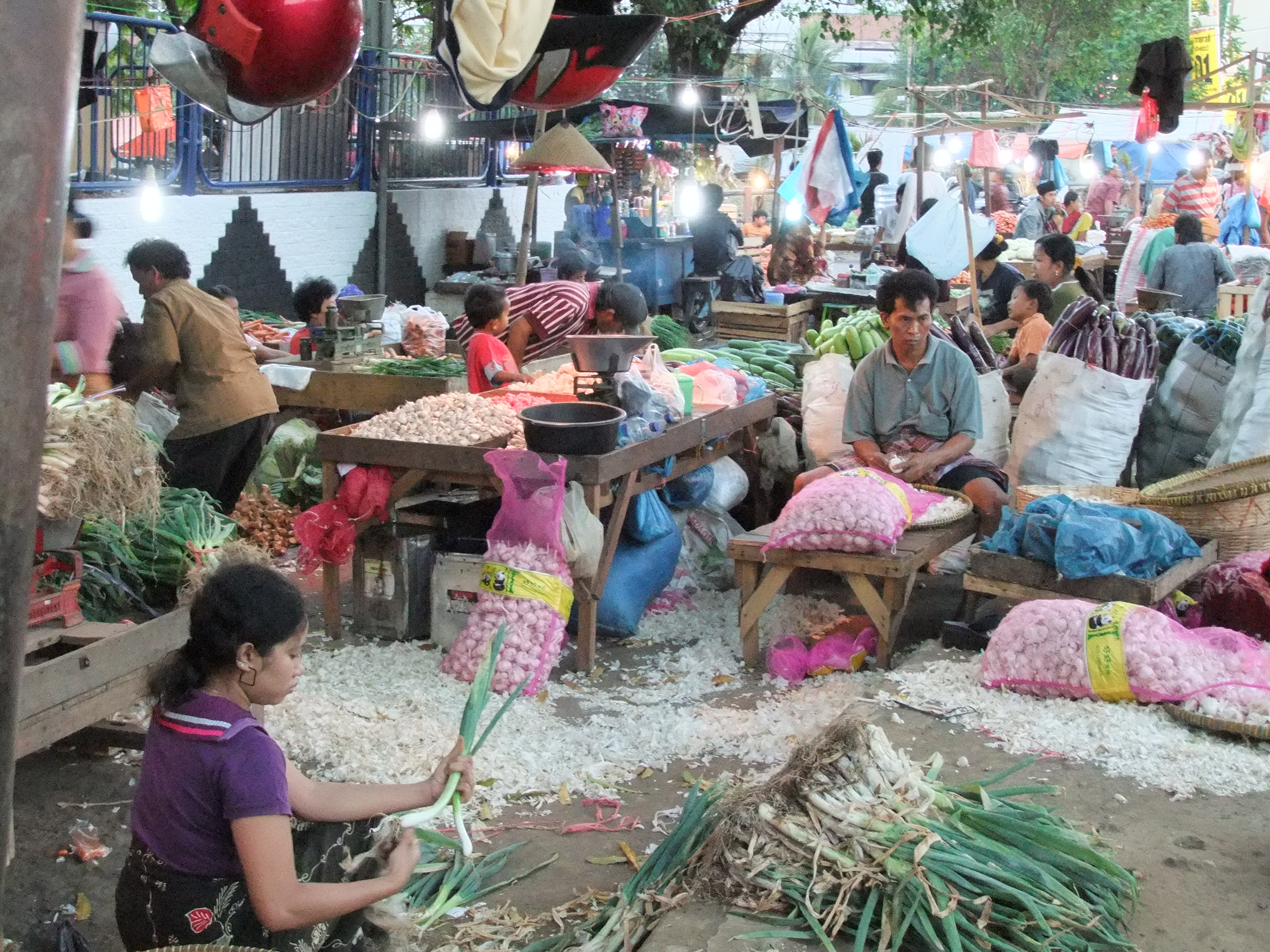
Pasar Keputran, a pasar pagi in Surabaya, Indonesia.

Pasar pagi (Malay/Indonesian, lit.: 'morning market') is a type of traditional market found in Malaysia and Indonesia, sometimes classified as a wet market.

== Operating hours ==
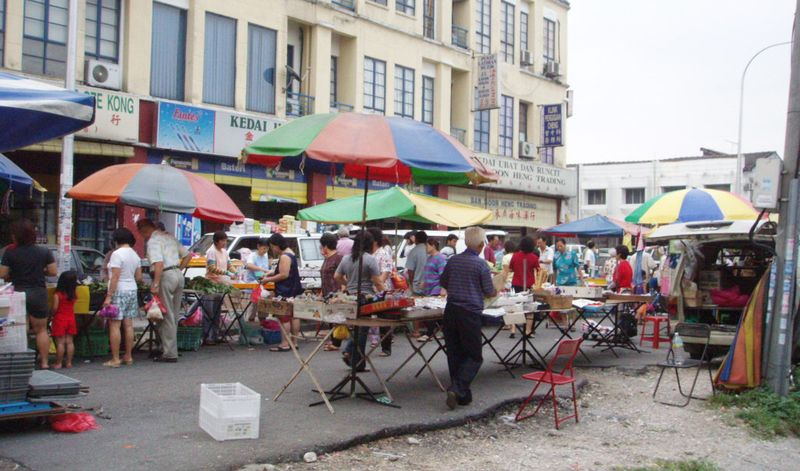
Pasar pagi in Malaysia.

Pasar pagi mostly operates from early morning to the afternoon. Nevertheless, there is also a related traditional market called pasar malam (lit. 'night market'). The difference between pasar pagi and pasar malam is in its operating hours. Pasar pagi opens early in the morning from dawn to noon every day, approximately from 04:00 to 12:00. On the other hand, pasar malam opens at night, approximately from 17:00 to 22:00, and only on selected days of the week.

The type of goods being sold is also quite different. Pasar pagi is where many housewives, domestic helpers, and local folks appear to shop for their daily needs, mostly uncooked fresh produce. The things that are on sale are usually fresh daily produce, including fruits, vegetables, spices, fish, meat, eggs, and all kinds of daily products. While pasar malam is more to cater a leisurely shopping and eating-out activity, selling ready-to-eat food, snacks, clothing, and various knick-knacks.

== Indonesia ==
In Indonesia, practically all traditional markets are pasar pagi, open from early in the dawn to mid-day. Often the stalls are temporarily overflowing occupying nearby streets around the marketplace — which normally open for traffic in other hours of the day. They sell fresh produce, such as vegetables, fruits, chicken, meat, and fish. The major pasar pagi in Jakarta are Pasar Pagi Mangga Dua, Pasar Induk Kramat Jati, Pasar Minggu and Pasar Senen. Pasar Minggu specializes in fruits and vegetables, while Pasar Senen specializes on selling kue, as they offer a rich variety of traditional Indonesian snacks, open every subuh (dawn). Meanwhile, in Samarinda, the only market named as such is the Samarinda Morning Market.

== Malaysia ==
In Malaysia, one of the biggest pasar pagi is at Pasar Pudu at Pudu and Jalan Pasar at Chow Kit area in Kuala Lumpur.

In March 2020, all wet markets (including pasar pagi) were temporarily banned from operating due to the COVID-19 pandemic.

== See also ==
- Bazaar – Type of public marketplace
- Hawker centre – Open-air food court in Asia
- Kopi tiam – Coffee shop in Southeast Asian countries
- Market (place) – Space in which a market operates
- Pasar malam – Night market found in Brunei, Indonesia, Malaysia and Singapore
- Retail – Sale of goods and services
- Tamu (marketplace) – Traditional indigenous marketplace of northern Borneo
- Wet market – Market selling perishable goods, including meat, produce, and food animals
