= Mante people =

Legendary ethnic group of Indonesia

Manti or Mantir

Regions with significant populations
- Indonesia (Aceh)

Languages
- Mante language (extinct)

Related ethnic groups
- Proto-Malay, Acehnese

The Mante people (Manti in Gayonese) or also spelled as Mantir, are one of the earliest ethnic groups frequently mentioned in legendary folklore to have inhabited Aceh, Indonesia. This ethnic group, along with other indigenous people such as the Lanun, Sakai, Jakun, Senoi, and Semang peoples, are the ethnic groups that formed the existing Acehnese people today. The Mante people are regarded as part of the Proto-Malay people group that initially settled around the region of Aceh Besar Regency and in the interior jungle. These indigenous people were thought to have migrated to Aceh through the Malay Peninsula.

In the Acehnese legend, the Batak and Mante peoples were mentioned as the descendants of Kawom Lhèë Reutōïh (lit. 'the people of three hundred'); which were also one of the indigenous peoples in Aceh. Today, the Mante people are extinct or have disappeared as a result of intermarriage with other non-indigenous people groups that arrived later. To date, there is no strong scientific evidence for the existence of this people.

== Alleged last appearance ==
In March 2017, there were video recordings by a group of bikers in Aceh who accidentally saw and recorded a man who was thought to be a Mante tribesman. The alleged Mante man at the site was caught by surprise and ran away immediately; and the scene was recorded by one of the bikers in the group. The video recording was uploaded on YouTube and quickly became a viral topic of discussion on social medias and in the news in Indonesia.

The spread of the news gained the attention of the Aceh government to dispatch a search team to find the Mante people and examine their real existence. The Ministry of Social Affairs department also participated in the search in order to provide social security to the Mante people.
