= Masakat =

Traditional Burmese pudding

- Type: Snack (mont)
- Place of origin: Myanmar (Burma)
- Region or state: Southeast Asia
- Associated cuisine: Burmese
- Main ingredients: corn starch, cashew nuts

Masakat (Burmese: မာစကတ် or မာစကပ်; pronounced [màsəkaʔ]) is a traditional Burmese snack or mont. The snack is essentially a translucent pudding cooked with cashew nuts.

Masakat originates in Mandalay, and its origins are attributed to an Indian dessert of the same name. The term masakat is likely cognate with Acehnese meuseukat, a confection popular in Aceh, Indonesia. The dessert is likened to Karachi halwa, and is made with corn starch, sugar, butter, cardamom seeds, and cashew nuts.
