= Bugis, Samarinda Kota =

Village in Samarinda Kota, Samarinda, East Kalimantan

Bugis
- Urban village
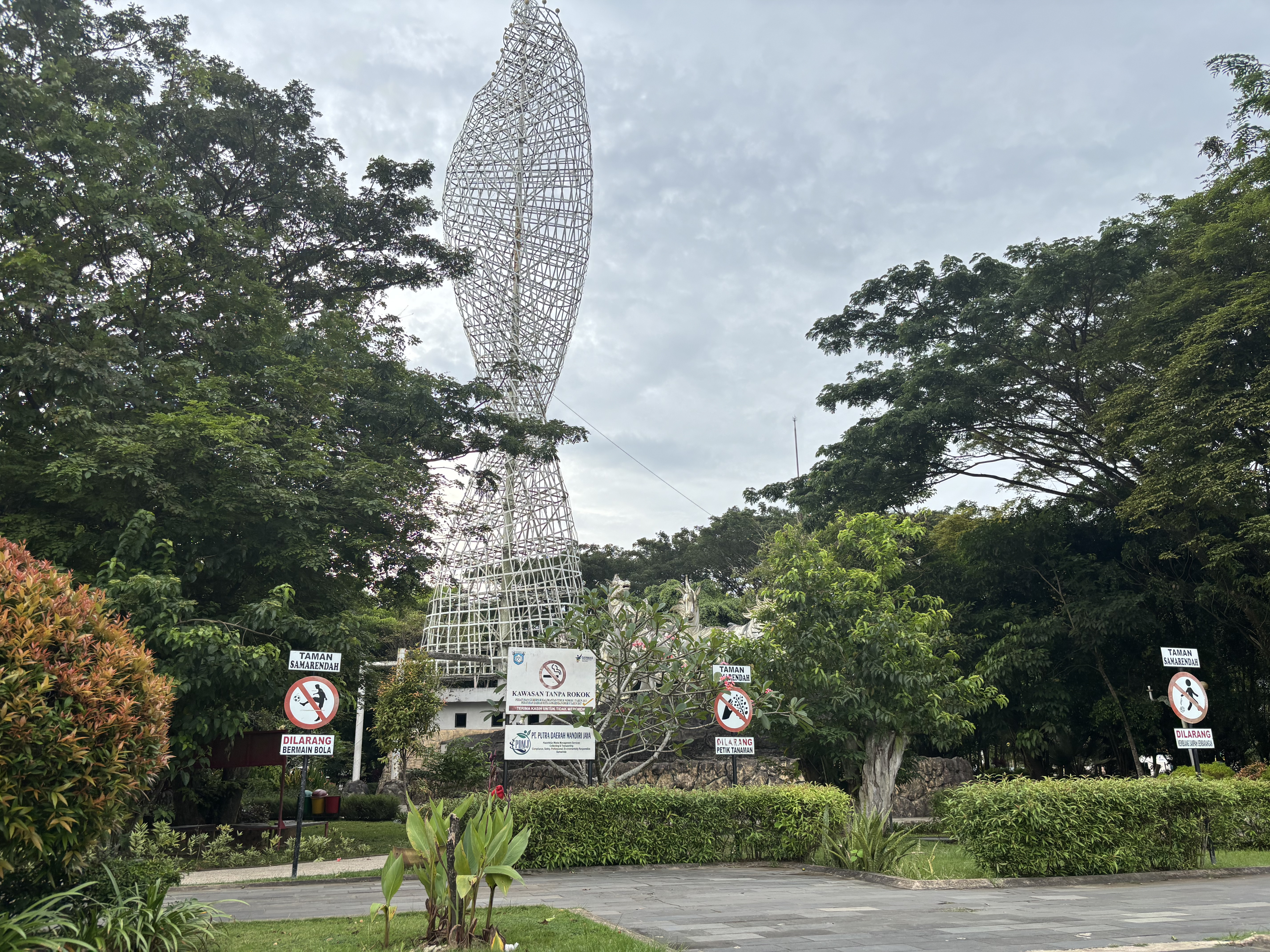
- Samarendah Park
- Interactive map of Bugis
- Location Bugis (Indonesia)
- Coordinates: 0°29′41.75146″S 117°8′43.58782″E
- Country: Indonesia
- Province: East Kalimantan
- City: Samarinda
- District: Samarinda Kota

Area
  - Total: 0.58 km^{2} (0.22 sq mi)

Population (2024)
  - Total: 4,472
  - Density: 7,700/km^{2} (20,000/sq mi)
- Time zone: UTC+8 (ICT)
- Regional code: 64.72.05.1004

Bugis (Indonesian pronunciation: [ˈbʊɡɪs]) is an urban village (kelurahan) inside the district of Samarinda Kota, Samarinda, East Kalimantan, Indonesia. As of 2024, it was inhabited by 4,472 people, and currently has the total area of 0.58 km^{2}. Bugis consists of 19 rukun tetangga (pillar of neighbours).

Bugis currently serves as de facto seat of Samarinda city government, as it is currently home to the Town Hall of Samarinda. There were proposals back in the early 2020s to relocate the complex into more peripheral locations, such as Tanah Merah, Sungai Siring (North Samarinda), Makroman (Sambutan), or Simpang Pasir (Palaran), although the fourth option was later withdrawn.
