= Likok Pulo =

Indonesian traditional dance

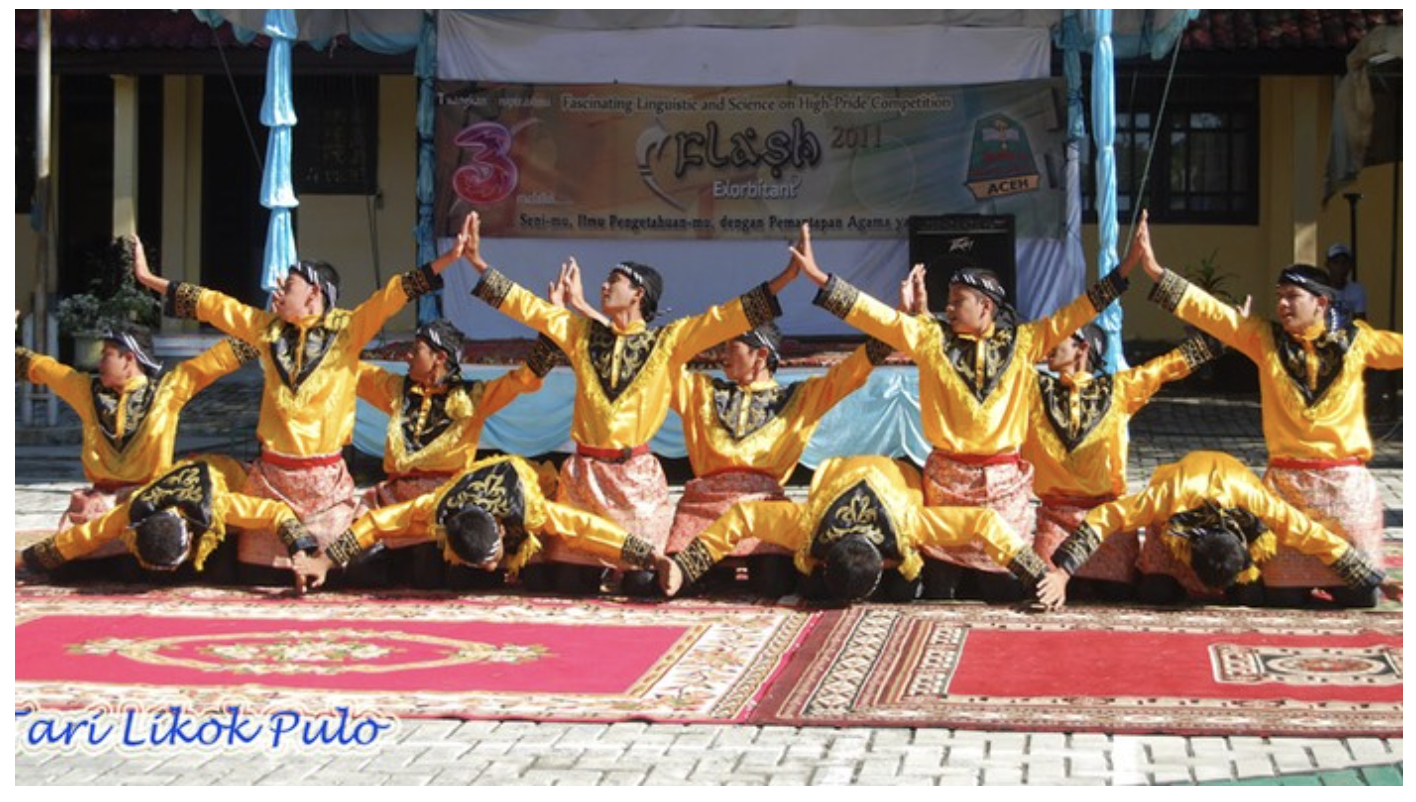
Likok Pulo dance

Likok Pulo is a traditional dance originating from Aceh, Indonesia. "Likok" means dance moves, while "Pulo" means island. Pulo here refers to a small island at the northern tip of Sumatra Island which is also called Breueh Island, or Beras Island.

This dance was born around 1849, was created by an old Muslim cleric who was washed away at sea and stranded in Pulo Aceh. This dance is held after planting rice or after harvesting rice, usually the show is held at night even if the dance is contested can run all night until morning. The dance is played by sitting cross-legged, in line, or shoulder to shoulder.

A main player called Cèh is in the middle of the player. Two Rapa'i players are on the back or left and right sides of the player. While the dance moves only function the upper limbs, body, hands and head. Dance movement in principle is a movement by the body, skills, uniformity or equality by functioning of the hands together forwards, to the left or right side, up, and circular from front to back, with the tempo slow to fast.

== See also ==
- Saman
- Acehnese people
