= Loke Hall =

Early 20th century building in Kuala Lumpur, Malaysia

Coordinates: 3°08′58″N 101°41′32″E

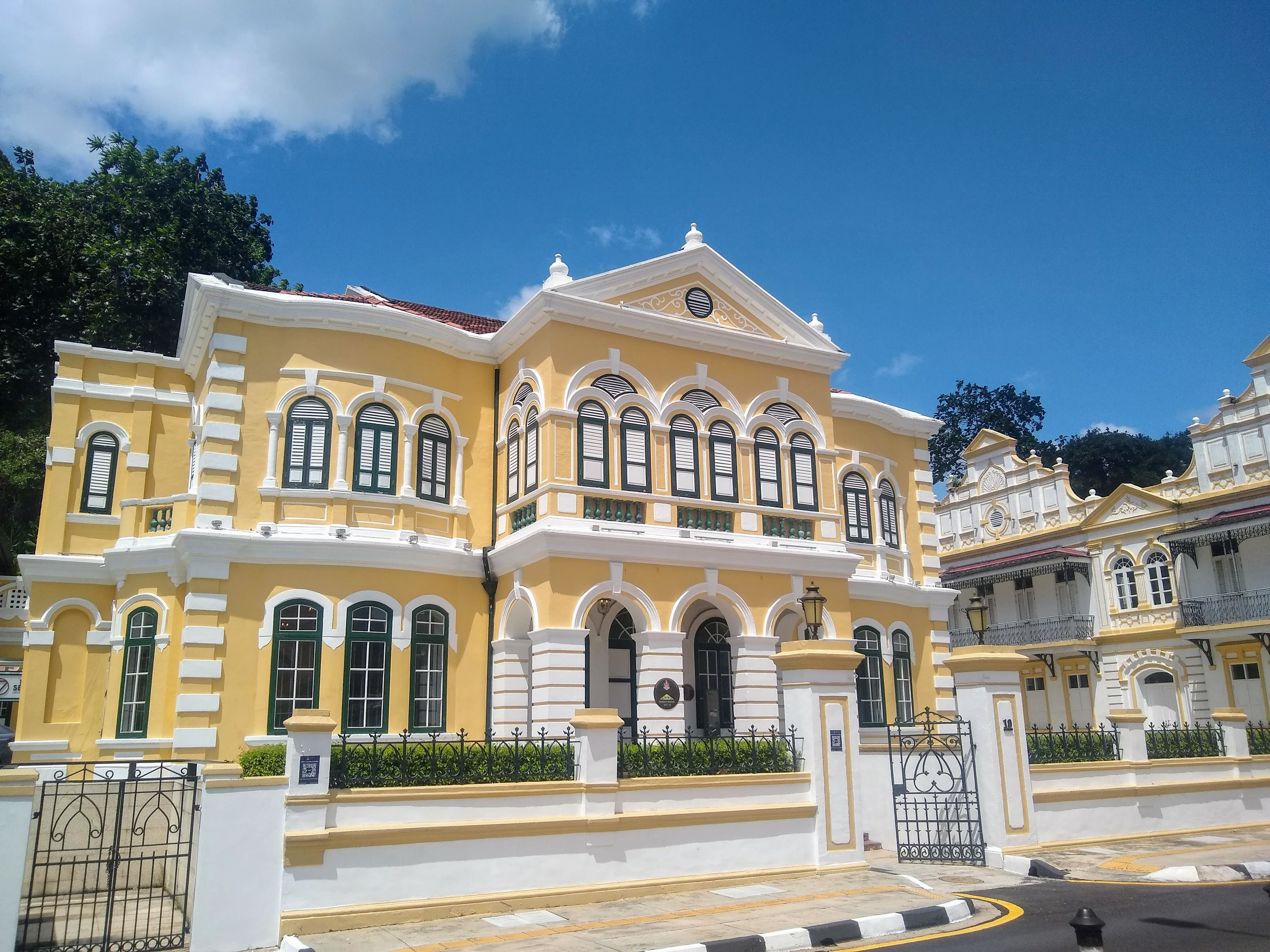
- Alternative names: Rumah Tangsi

General information
- Architectural style: Palladian
- Location: 10 Jalan Tangsi, Kuala Lumpur, Malaysia
- Construction started: 1903
- Completed: 1907
- Client: Loke Chow Kit
- Owner: Kuala Lumpur City Council (DBKL)

Technical details
- Floor count: 2

Design and construction
- Architect: A.K.Moosdeen

Loke Hall, also known as Rumah Tangsi, is a historical mansion in Kuala Lumpur, Malaysia.

== History ==
Loke Hall, situated at 10 Jalan Tangsi or formerly Barrack Road (tangsi being the Malay word for 'barrack'), Kuala Lumpur was built as a town residence for prominent local businessman Loke Chow Kit. Designed by A.K. Moosdeen, construction began in 1903 and was completed in 1907. In 1909, the building was taken over on a long lease by Empire Hotel Company Ltd who converted it into a hotel. In 1919, after renovation works were carried out, it became known as the Peninsula Hotel which operated until 1973.

In 1973, the Malaysian Institute of Architects (PAM) took over the building, initially on a two-year lease. While continuing in occupation, in 1981, PAM was served with notice to vacate the premises by the estate of Alan Loke after it sold the property to a development company. Amidst public concern about its future, it was acquired by Kuala Lumpur City Council. PAM remained as a tenant until 2012 when the City Council requested it vacate the premises and converted it into a social and cultural event venue which was opened in 2017. In 2025, Prime Minister, Anwar Ibrahim, hosted dinners at the building for the Prime Minister of Singapore and later the President of Indonesia.

Loke Hall was gazetted as a National Heritage Building under the Antiquities Act in 2012.

== Description ==
Loke Hall's Palladian architectural design was said to have been chosen by Loke Chow Kit after observations of European architecture on a tour of Europe in 1903.
