= Samarinda Morning Market =

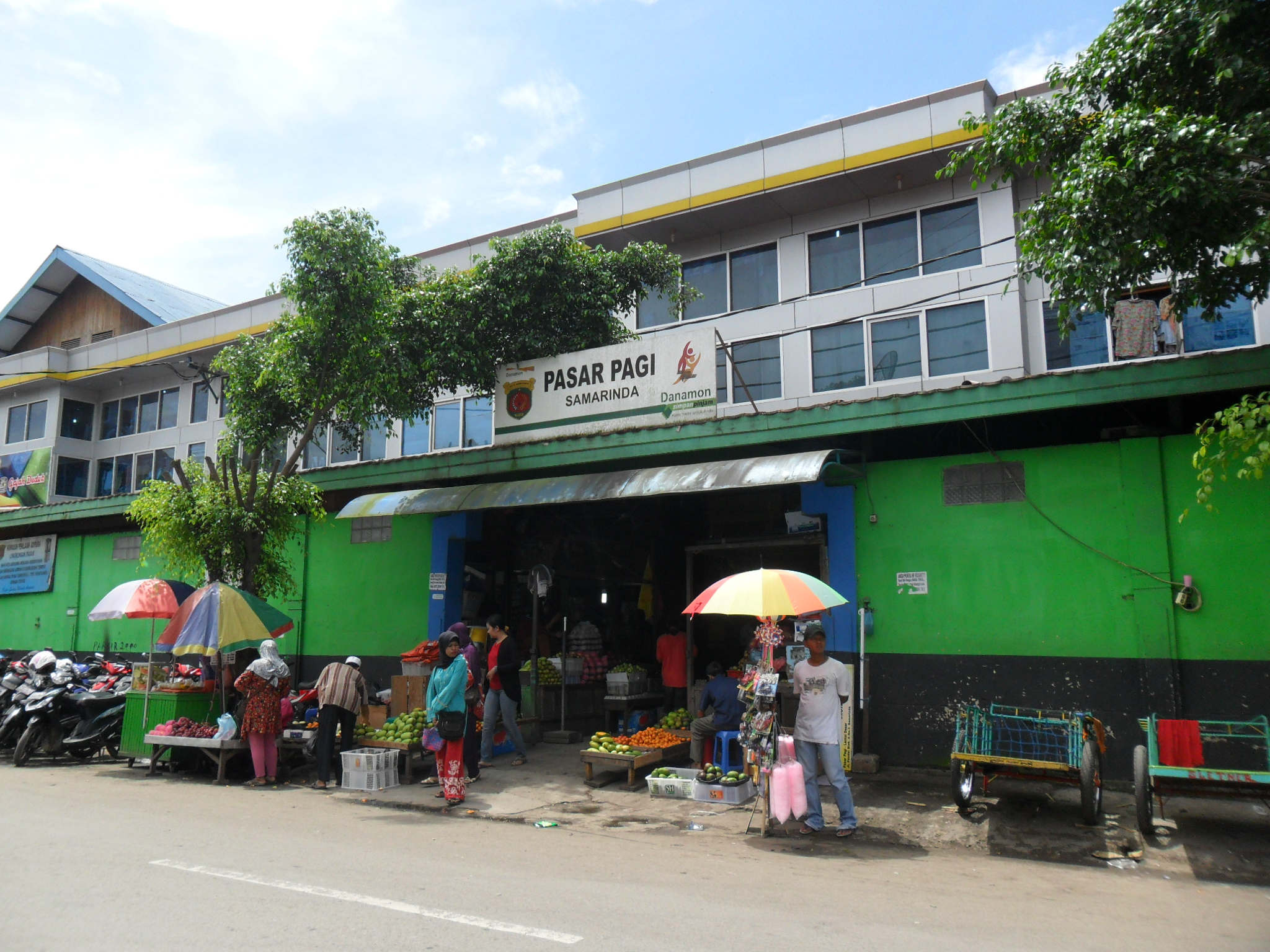
- Old building before 2024
- Interactive map of the Samarinda Morning Market area

General information
- Type: Traditional market
- Location: Jenderal Sudirman Road, Pasar Pagi, Samarinda Kota, Samarinda Indonesia
- Coordinates: 0.502342°S 117.146526°E
- Opened: Old building: Early 20th century (exact date unknown); New building: May 2026 (scheduled)
- Closed: Old building: January 2024
- Demolished: Old building: March 2024
- Owner: UPTD Citra Niaga

Website
- Official website

The Samarinda Morning Market (Indonesian: Pasar Pagi Samarinda) is the oldest traditional market in Samarinda, East Kalimantan, Indonesia. Located at the village of Pasar Pagi (named after the market) in Samarinda Kota, the Morning Market had been existed since 1940s as the only market in Samarinda. Considering its old age, the market was demolished in 2024 to make room for a new building.

== History ==
Back when Samarinda was established as the capital of East Kutai district (kewedanaan, not to be confused with the regency) in 1946, the Morning Market was the only market in the city. The building was originally constructed using woods and made with partitions. Following the construction of Pinang Babaris shopping complex in 1971, Segiri Market in 1978, and other markets under presidential instruction, the Morning Market began to grow significantly. Along with its development, this market's infrastructure increasingly became inadequate.

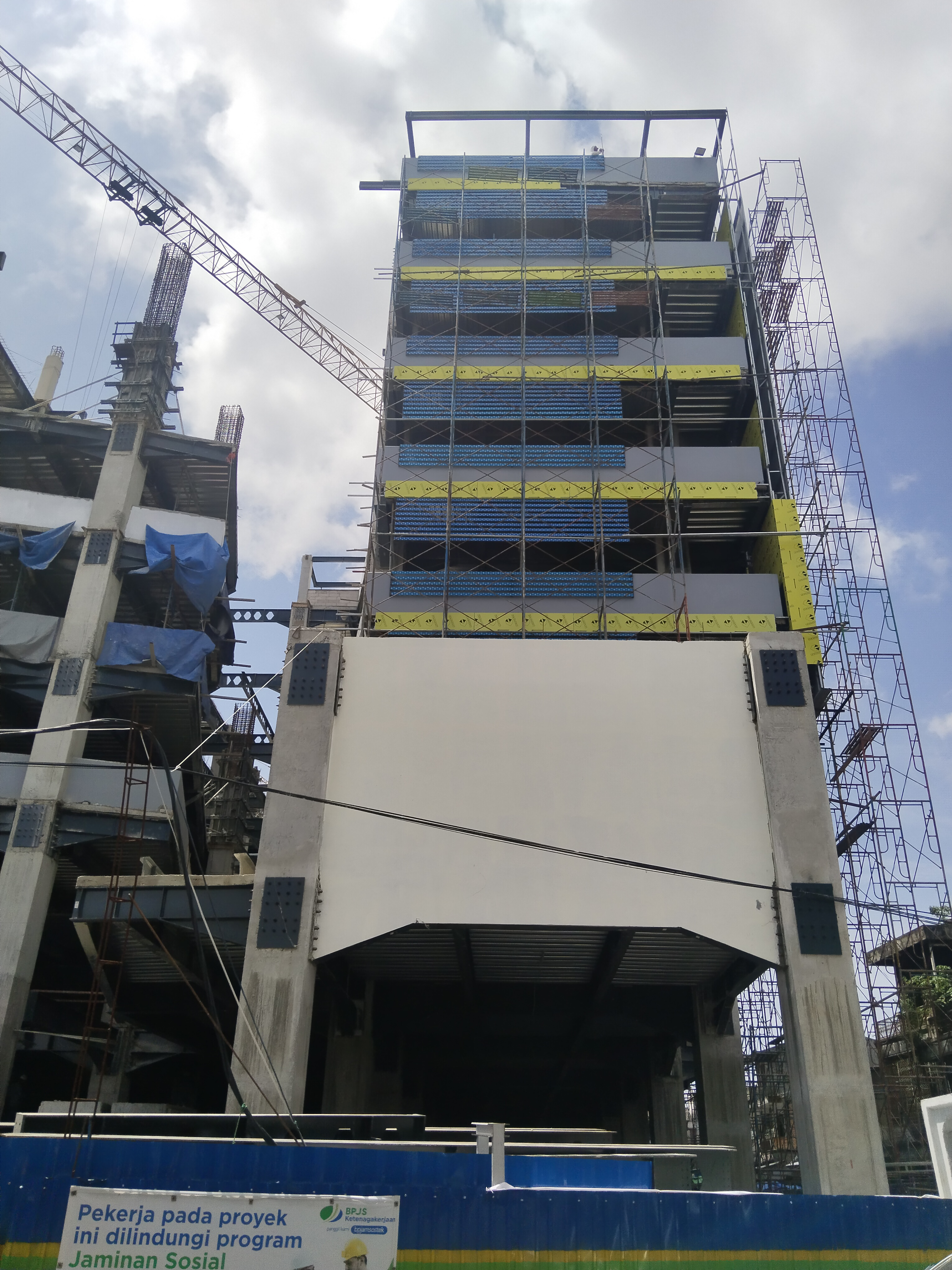
New building, under construction as of February 2025

Considering its old age and unfeasibility, Andi Harun's government started to revitalise the market. Samarinda Morning Market Vendors' Forum (FP3S) concerned with the local government's plan in September 2023, as it caused anxiety and panic among vendors. They requested to the government to delay the relocation from its original schedule in November 2023 into following Eid al-Fitr of 2024.

The Morning Market was fully emptied on the third week of January 2024, slightly behind the original schedule in December last year. Vendors from the Morning Market, numbered up to 1,500 and majority of them were convection vendors, were relocated to kiosks on the first three floors at Segiri Grocery, while some others were relocated to Mesra Indah Mall. Some relocated vendors complained about declining profits at Segiri Grocery. Meanwhile, vendors of meats, vegetables, and other basic necessities, were relocated to the new building of Sungai Dama market.

The building began to be demolished in March 2024 to make room for the construction of a new building. Prior to this process, Financial and Regional Assets Management Body opened an auction on the building between 28 and 31 January, won by Mr. Faris, the second bidder with a bid value of IDR 1.5 billion. A previous bidder with a slightly higher bid of 1.7 billion, had withdrawn after observing missing iron frames on the building.

During its demolition, the process had been marked by various issues. Forty-eight owners of nearby shophouses affected by the demolition had refused, although first assistant of the local government, Ridwan Tassa, attempted to negotiate with them. He also insisted that the demolition would not affect such buildings with freehold title. Meanwhile, it also led into tensions with around 2,800 vendors from the Morning Market. This conflict has since coolen down.

It was later announced that the new building (currently under construction) would be occupied by vendors in May 2025, and the market will operate by May next year. The local government had also opened registration for vendors in the Samarinda Morning Market, conducted from 20 December until 24 December 2025 through its official website.
