= Meuseukat =

Dodol-like cake found in Acehnese cuisine

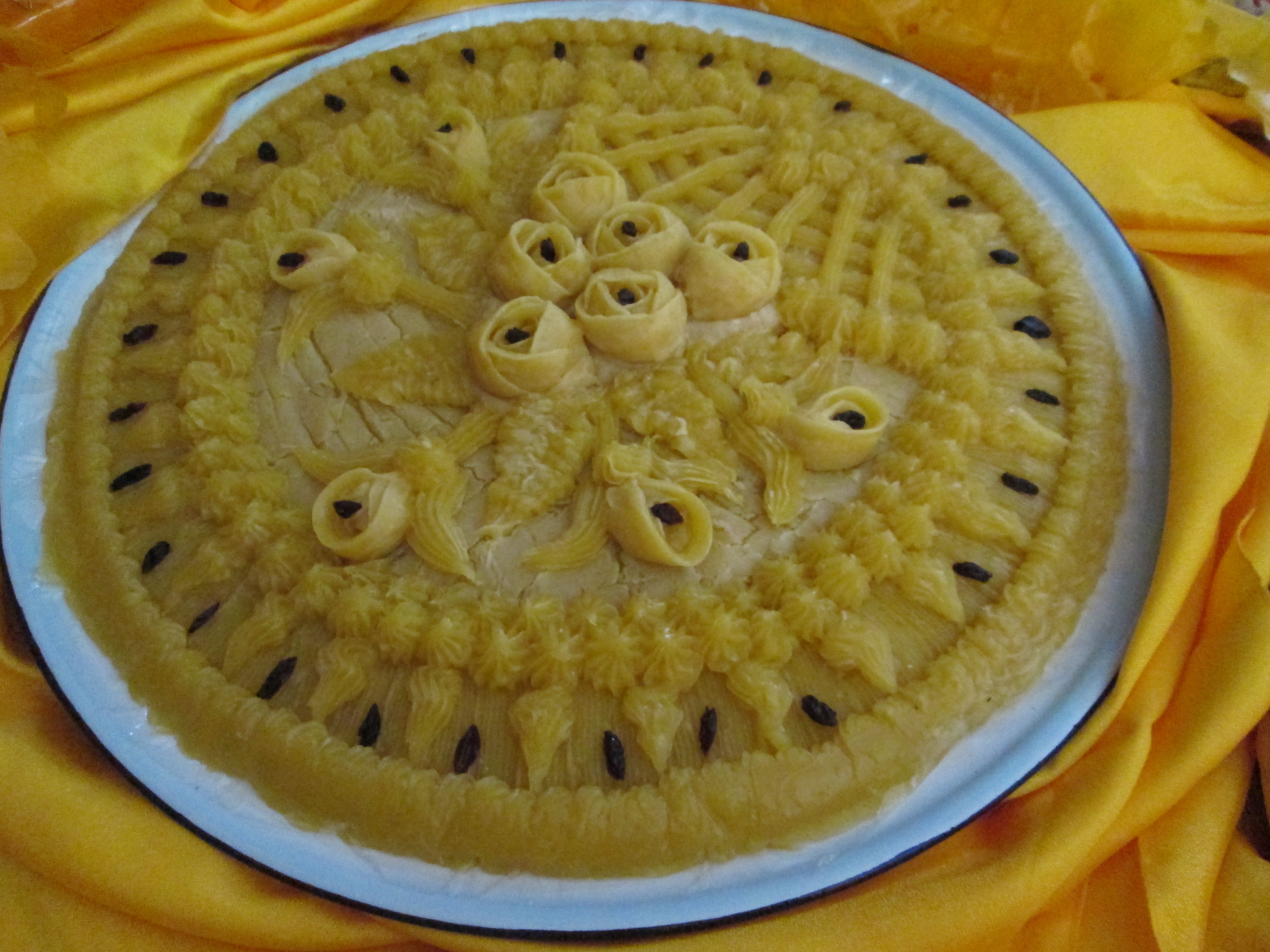
Meuseukat

Meuseukat is a dodol-like cake found in Acehnese cuisine. The cake is made using flour, sugar, a mixture of pineapple and lemon juice, and butter. The pineapple used in the cake imparts a yellow hue. Meuseukat is typically served on special occasions, such as during wedding festivities, and religious celebrations like Eid al-Fitr and Eid al-Adha.

The term meuseukat is likely cognate with Burmese masakat, a confection popular in Upper Myanmar.
