= Keumamah =

Dried fish traditionally produced in Aceh, Indonesia

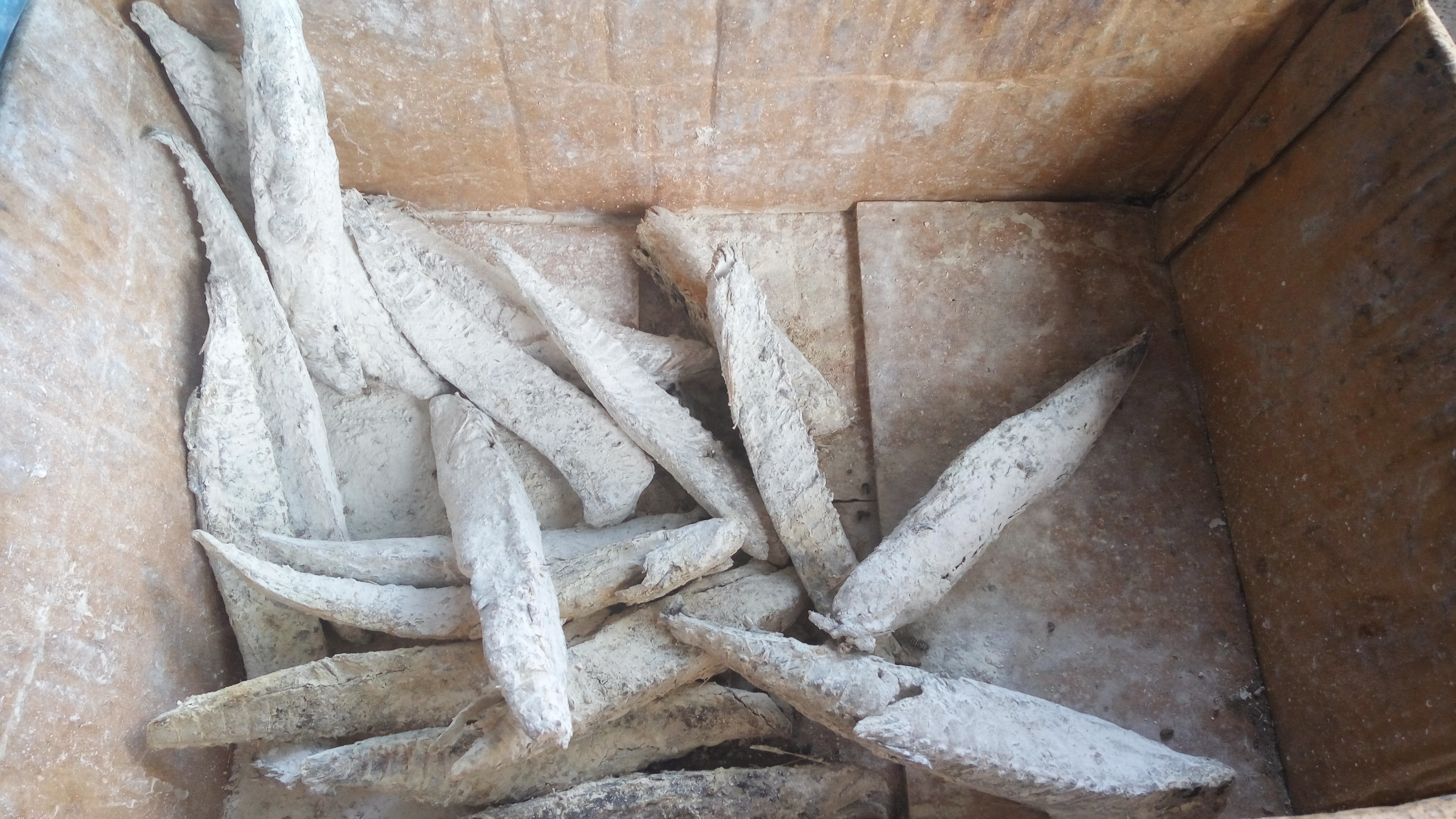

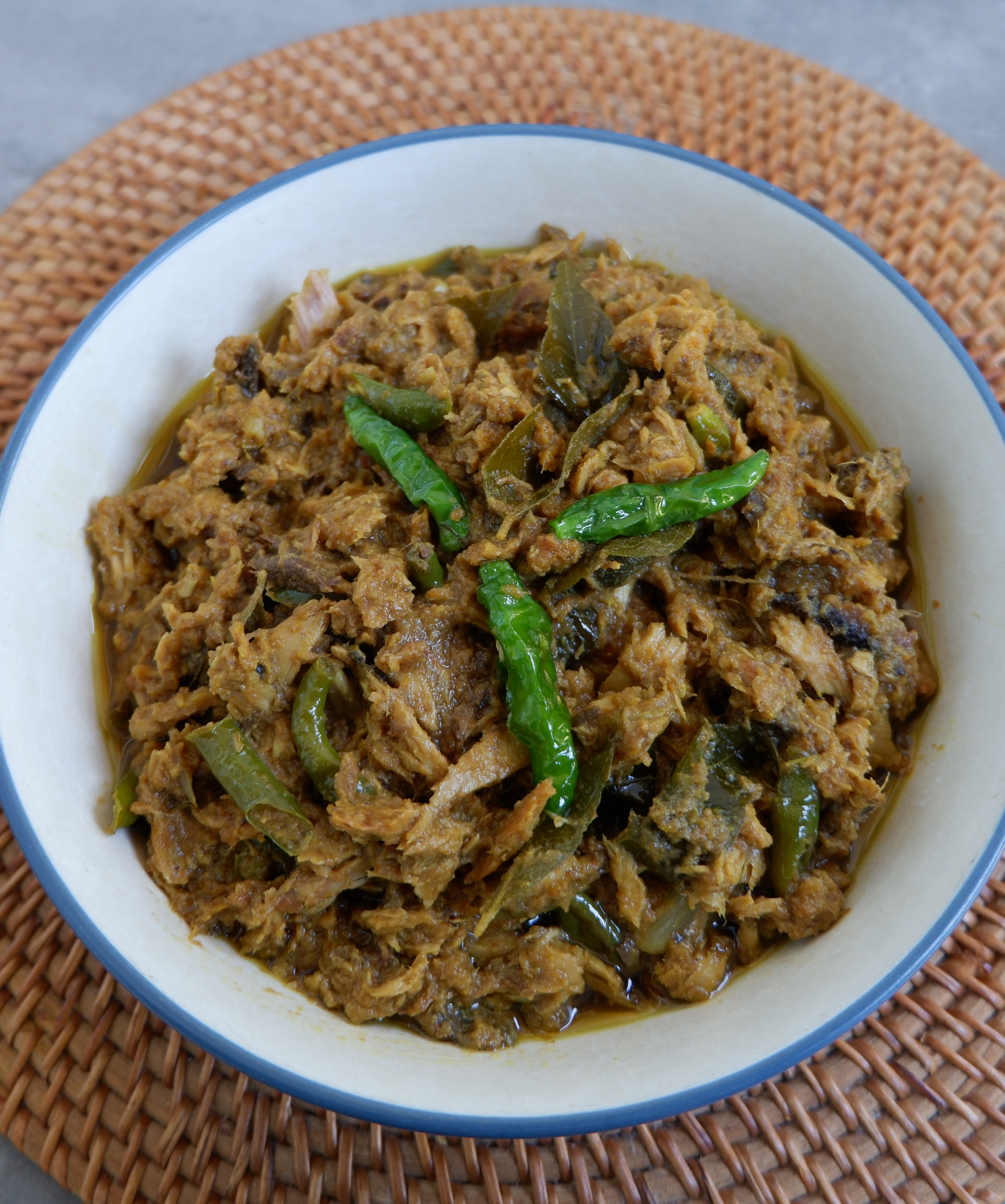

Keumamah is a traditional dried fish in Acehnese cuisine, usually made skipjack or tuna. Keumamah is also known as "wood fish", due to its hardness. It is preserved through several processes, from cleaning the fish to boiling, drying, and storing; therefore, keumamah can be stored for years, provided it is kept dry and free from moisture.

The spices used to prepare keumamah are:

- asam sunti;
- curry tree;
- bird's eye chili and
- green chili.

Keumamah is one of the main dishes served at Achenese kenduri (traditional celebrations). In the past, keumamah was also consumed by Acehnese fighters during the war against the Dutch colonial government in Aceh from 1873 to 1904.
