= Samarinda Kota =

District of Samarinda, East Kalimantan

- District
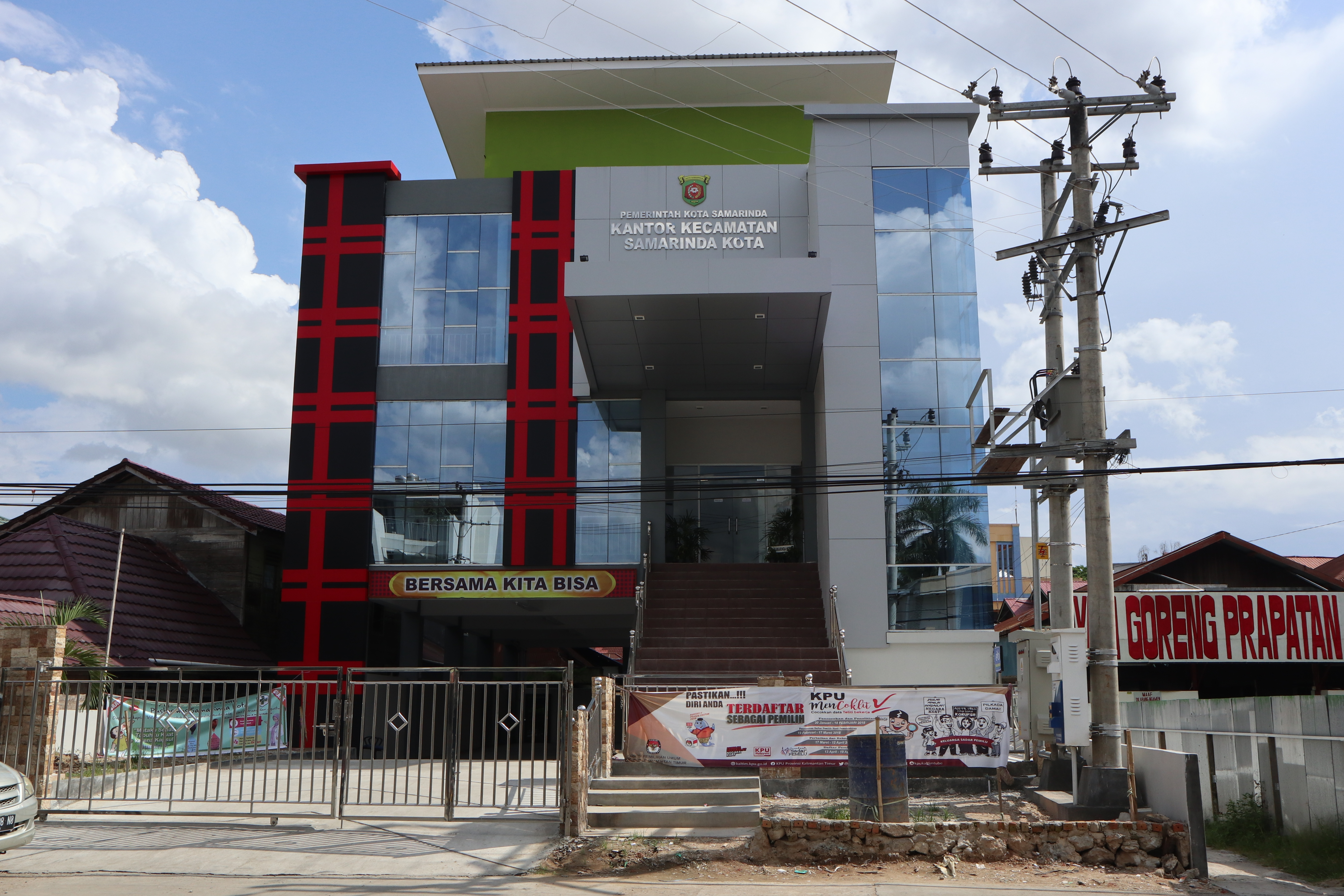
- Samarinda Kota District Office, Samarinda
- Interactive map of Samarinda Kota
- Location Samarinda Kota (Indonesia)
- Coordinates: 0°29′49.70548″S 117°9′24.73355″E
- Country: Indonesia
- Province: East Kalimantan
- City: Samarinda
- Established: 14 December 2010
- District seat: Sungai Pinang Luar

Government
  - District head (Camat): Yosua Laden

Area
  - Total: 11.12 km^{2} (4.29 sq mi)

Population (2023)
  - Total: 32,379
  - Density: 2,912/km^{2} (7,541/sq mi)
- Time zone: UTC+8 (ICT)
- Regional code: 64.72.09
- Villages: 5

Samarinda Kota (Indonesian pronunciation: [samaˈrinda ˈkota], lit. 'Samarinda town') is a district of Samarinda, East Kalimantan, Indonesia. As of 2023, it was inhabited by 32,379 people, and currently has the total area of 11.12 km^{2}.

It was separated from Samarinda Ilir and Samarinda Ulu (Bugis only) on 14 December 2010. Its district seat is located at the village of Sungai Pinang Luar. One of its villages, Bugis, serves as de facto seat of Samarinda city government, although there were proposals to relocate into peripheral locations, including Sungai Siring (North Samarinda) or Makroman (Sambutan) in early 2020s.

An older district, with the same name, was already bifurcated into Samarinda Ilir and Samarinda Ulu during the early days of city's formation in 1960s (date unknown).

== Governance ==
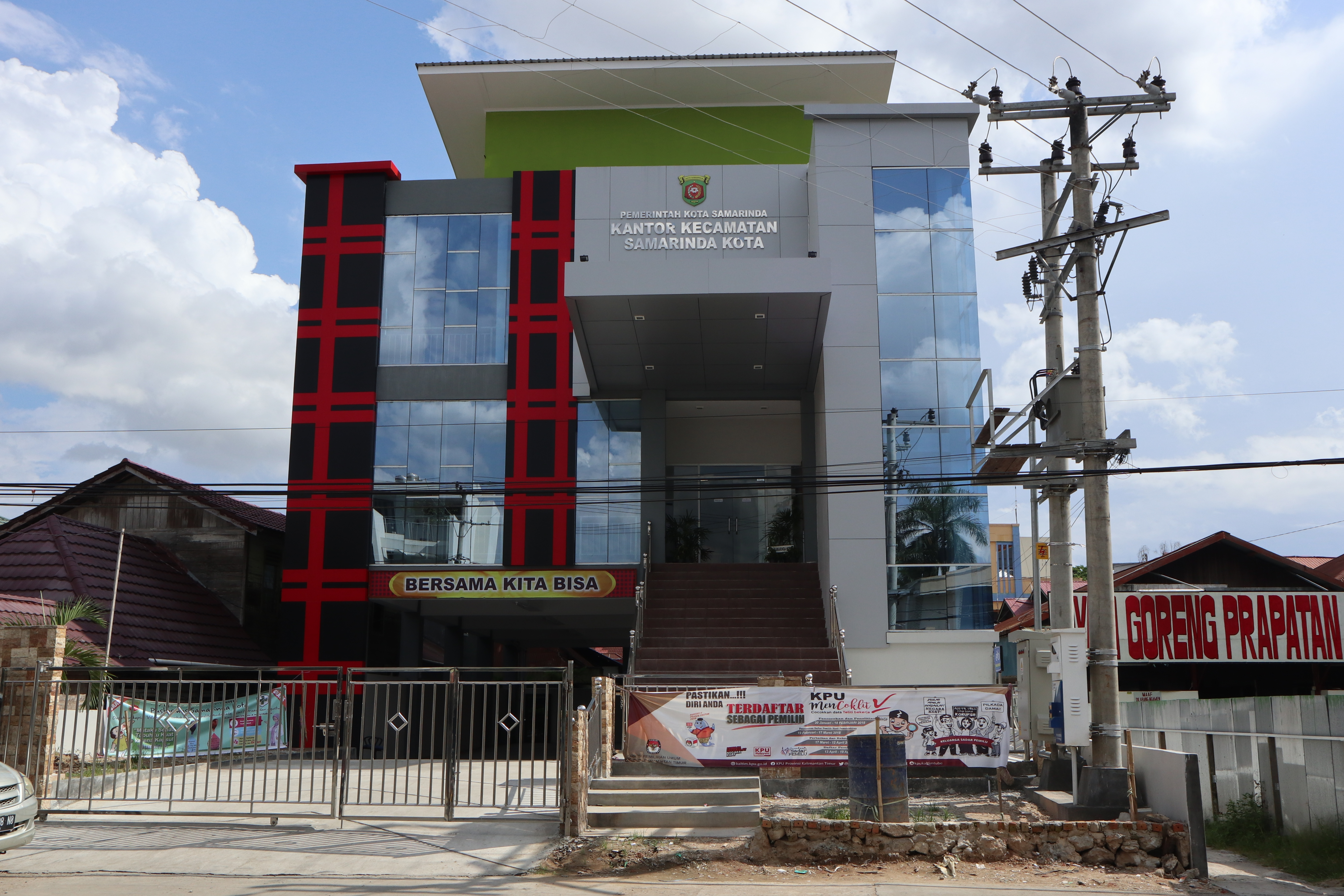
District head office at Sungai Pinang Luar, Samarinda Kota.

=== Villages ===
Samarinda Kota is divided into the following 5 villages (kelurahan):

Regional code (Kode wilayah)	Name	Area (km^{2})	Population (2023)	RT (rukun tetangga)
64.72.01.1001	Karang Mumus	0.49	5,923	23
64.72.01.1002	Pelabuhan	0.72	6,300	17
64.72.01.1003	Pasar Pagi	0.48	3,474	14
64.72.01.1004	Bugis	0.58	4,483	19
64.72.01.1005	Sungai Pinang Luar	8.85	12,199	37
	Totals	11.12	32,379	110
