= Sungkar =

Sungkar is a surname. Notable people with the surname include:

- Abdullah Sungkar (1937–1999), Indonesian terrorist
- Shireen Sungkar (born 1992), Indonesian actress and singer
- Zaskia Sungkar (born 1990), Indonesian actress and singer
