= Dina Astita =

Indonesian teacher

Dina Astita is an Indonesian teacher.

She is a survivor of the Indian Ocean tsunami who co-ordinated efforts to restart schooling in her remote Sumatran town in 2004 and 2005.

Her role in the aftermath of the tsunami was recognised by Time magazine, which included her in its list of the 100 most influential people of 2005.
