= Chow Kit station =

Monorail station in Kuala Lumpur, Malaysia

MR10 Chow Kit
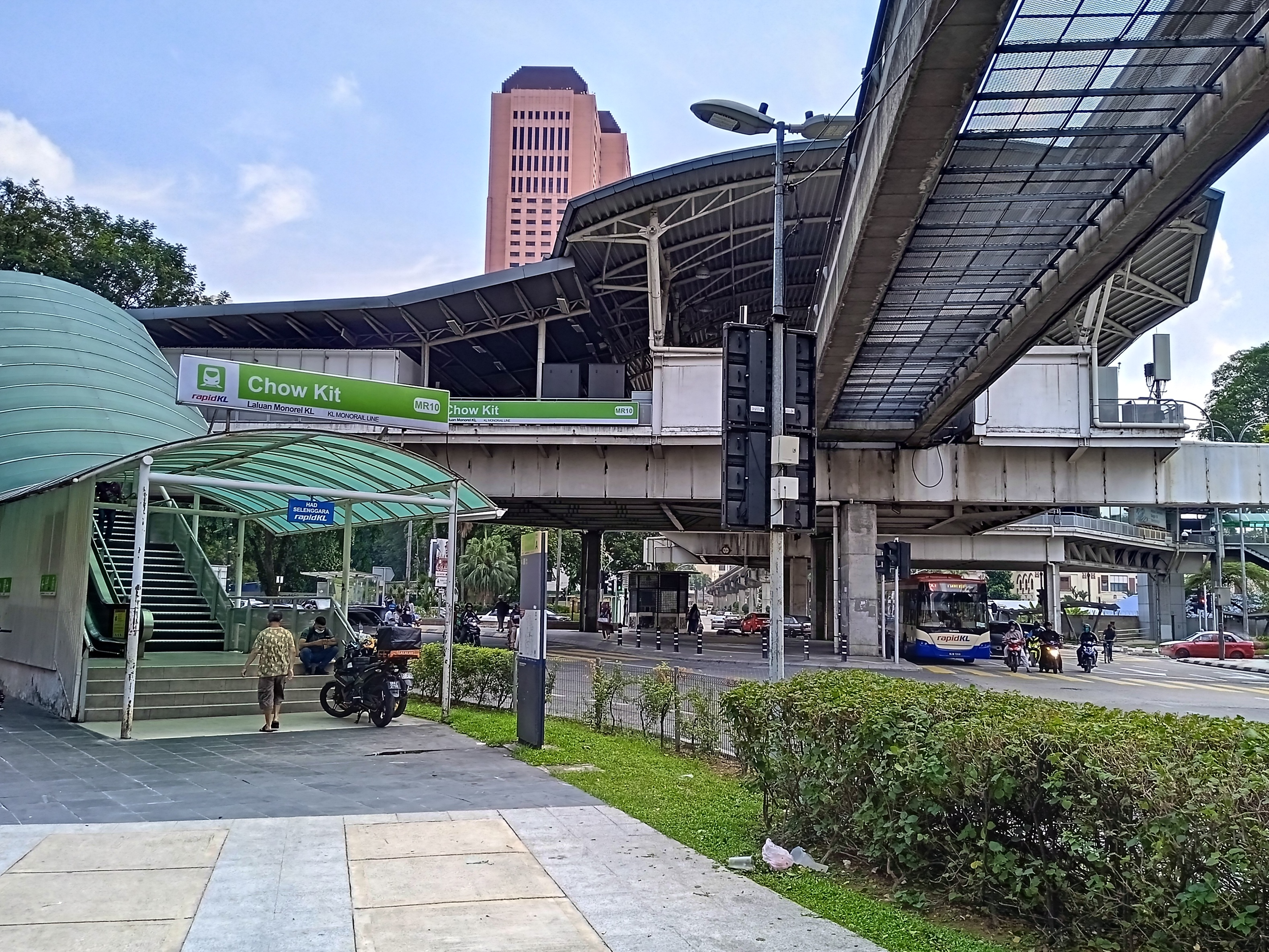
- The exterior of the Chow Kit station, as seen towards the northwest.

General information
- Other names: Malay: چاو كيت (Jawi); Chinese: 秋杰; Tamil: சௌக்கிட்
- Location: Intersection of Jalan Tuanku Abdul Rahman-Jalan Pahang, Chow Kit; 50350 Kuala Lumpur; Malaysia
- Coordinates: 3°10′2″N 101°41′53″E
- System: Rapid KL
- Owner: Prasarana Malaysia
- Operator: Rapid Rail
- Line: 8 KL Monorail
- Platforms: 2 side platforms
- Tracks: 2

Construction
- Structure type: Elevated
- Parking: Not available
- Cycle facilities: Not available
- Accessible: Available

Other information
- Station code: MR10

History
- Opened: 31 August 2003; 22 years ago

Services
Preceding station		Following station
Medan Tuanku towards Kuala Lumpur Sentral	KL Monorail	Titiwangsa Terminus
Location

Chow Kit station is a Malaysian elevated monorail train station that forms part of the Kuala Lumpur Monorail (KL Monorail) line, located in Kuala Lumpur and opened for train service on 31 August 2003.

The station, the second last KL Monorail station before the line's terminus at Titiwangsa, is located and named after the district of Chow Kit, over the meeting point of the southern end of Jalan Pahang and the northern end of Jalan Tuanku Abdul Rahman. The monorail line continues down Jalan Tuanku Abdul Rahman until the Sultan Ismail turnoff, turning toward the east.

The station has only two exits: One at the west side of the north end of the Jalan Tuanku Abdul Rahman, and the other on the eastern turnoff to Jalan Raja Muda Abdul Aziz.

== Landmarks within the vicinity ==
- Kuala Lumpur Hospital is close to this station.
- Plaza GM Kuala Lumpur

== See also ==
- List of rail transit stations in Klang Valley
