= Saman (dance) =

Indonesian traditional dance

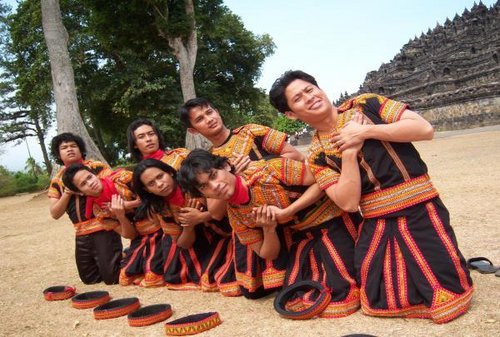
- Native name: Saman Jejuntèn, Saman Njik, Saman Ngerje (Umahsara), Bejamu Besaman (Saman Sara Ingi, Saman Roa Lo Roa Ingi), Saman Bale Asam, Saman Pertunjukan
- Genre: Traditional dance
- Origin: Gayo Lues, Indonesia

Saman dance
- UNESCO Intangible Cultural Heritage
- Country: Indonesia
- Reference: 00509
- Region: Asia and the Pacific

Inscription history
- Inscription: 2011 (6th session)
- List: Need of Urgent Safeguarding

Saman (also known as the dance of a thousand hands) is one of the most popular dances in Indonesia. Its origin is from the Gayo ethnic group from Gayo Lues, Aceh province, Indonesia, and it is usually performed to celebrate important occasions. The dance is characterized by its fast-paced rhythm and common harmony between dancers. These two elements are key figures of Saman and are among the reasons Saman is widely known and practiced in Indonesia, besides being relatively easy to learn.

On November 24, 2011, UNESCO officially recognized Aceh's traditional Saman dance as an Intangible Cultural Heritage in Need of Urgent Safeguarding.

The ASEAN Tourism Association (ASEANTA) named the Saman dance as the best ASEAN cultural preservation effort at the 25th ASEANTA Awards for Excellence 2012.

== Etymology ==
The word "saman" comes from Sheikh Saman, a cleric from Gayo in Aceh. Syekh Saman developed a dance which is now called the Saman dance to spread Islam in the land of Gayo, Province of Aceh, Indonesia.

== Form ==
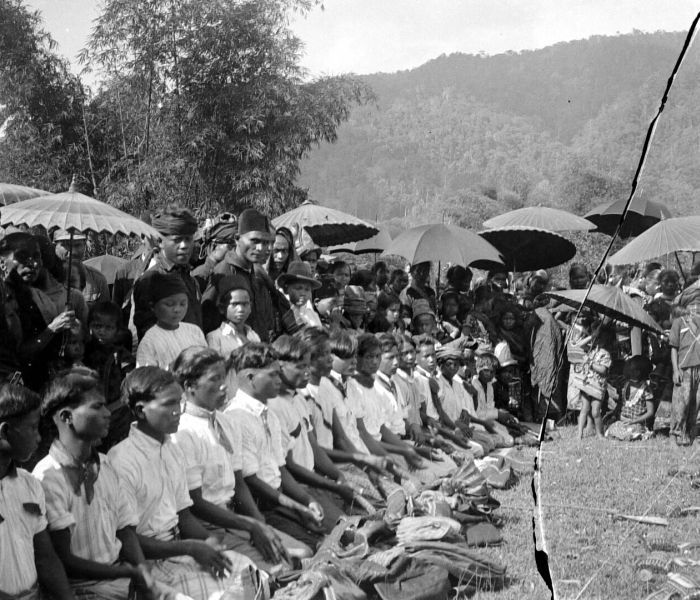
Saman dance in Lokop, East Aceh Regency during Dutch colonial period

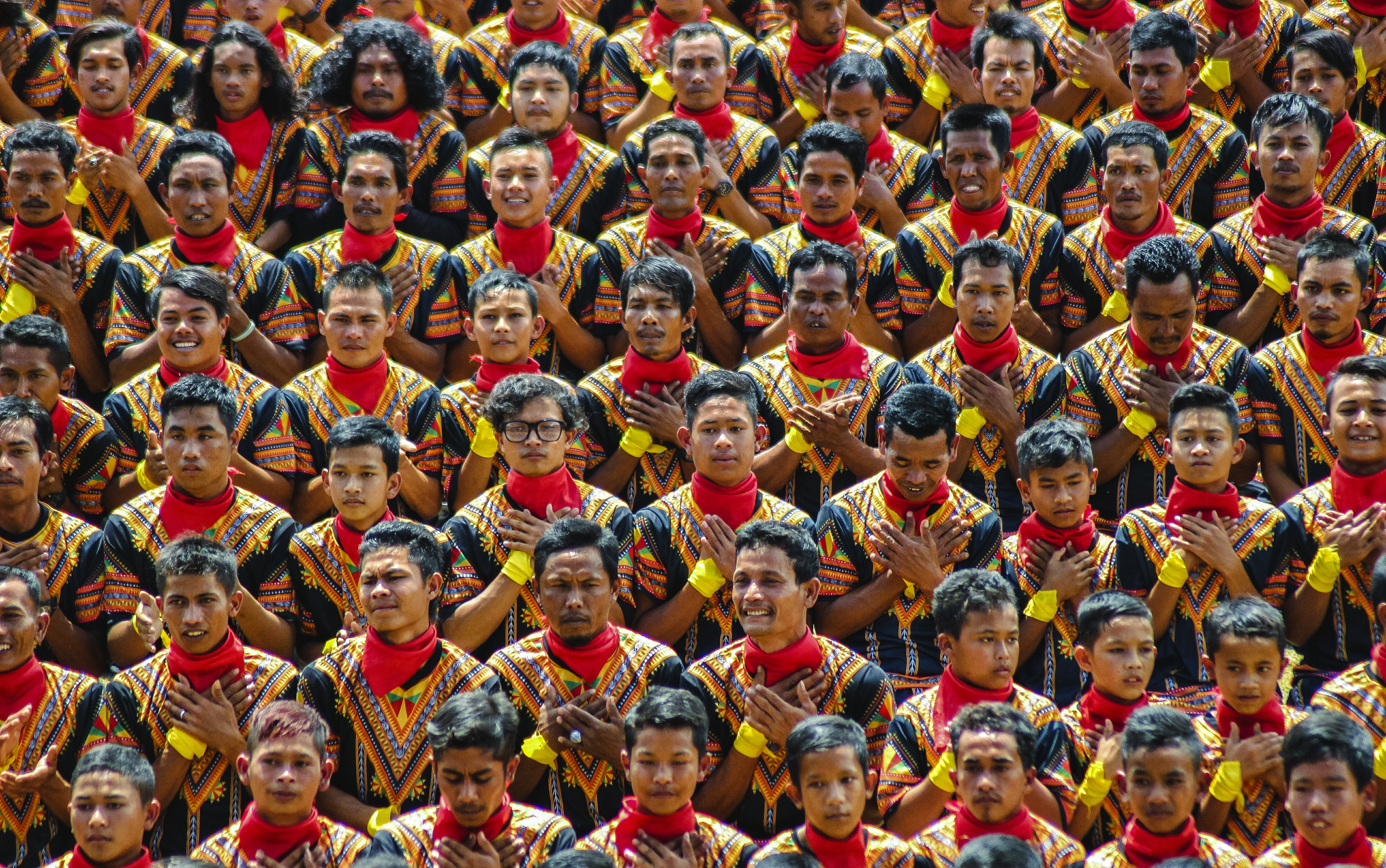
Saman dance performance.

The dance is performed by a group of people without musical instruments. Originally, the group was exclusively men. In performing this dance, the player sings some songs (syair) while doing the attractive movements. A short song (which leads to a short dance) can last for approximately 15 to 20 minutes.

== Performance ==
A typical Saman performance is usually constituted of the following elements: The dancers enter the stage and immediately form a single line while sitting in a form equivalent to the Japanese seiza. The singer then begins to sing, with the lyrics at the beginning commonly telling the general attributes of Gayo culture at a medium pace. The dancers then begin to move their hands rhythmically, following the movements. As the dance progresses, the movements are also performed with arms, head, and the upper body. The pace becomes faster, and the seat positions may change. The key element is that every dancer must move at the same time, creating a homogeneous, continuous line of movement that is often described as the defining feature of Saman dance. One thing that makes this dance unique is that the original Saman dance, which comes from Gayo Lues, is not accompanied by any musical instruments.

== See also ==
- Ratoh duek
- Likok Pulo
- Dance of Indonesia
- Islam in Indonesia
