= 2003–2004 Indonesian offensive in Aceh =

Anti-separatist offensive that helped end the insurgency in Aceh

- Part of the insurgency in Aceh
- Location of Aceh in Indonesia
Date	19 May 2003 – 13 May 2004
Location	Aceh, Indonesia
Result	Indonesian victory; Peace treaty in Helsinki

Belligerents
Indonesia; Indonesian National Armed Forces; Indonesian National Police	Free Aceh Movement

Commanders and leaders
Megawati Sukarnoputri; Susilo Bambang Yudhoyono; Endriartono Sutarto; Da'i Bachtiar	Hasan di Tiro; Muzakir Manaf; Abdullah Syafi'i †; Ishak Daud †

Strength
(Indonesia) 42,000 troops	5,000 fighters

Casualties and losses
(Indonesia) 64 killed 190 wounded	~2,200 killed 3,600 captured or surrendered
- 147 civilians killed

The 2003–2004 Indonesian offensive in Aceh, also known as Integrated Operation (Indonesian: Operasi Terpadu) against the Free Aceh Movement (GAM) separatists was launched on 19 May 2003, and lasted nearly one year. It followed a two-week ultimatum to GAM to accept special autonomy under Indonesian rule. It was one of the Indonesian military's largest campaigns since the 1975 invasion of East Timor. It severely disabled the rebel movement, and along with the 2004 Indian Ocean earthquake and tsunami brought the 30-year conflict in Aceh to an end.

== Background ==
On 28 April 2003, the Indonesian government issued an ultimatum to end the fighting and accept special autonomy for Aceh within two weeks. Free Aceh Movement (GAM) leaders based in Sweden refused the ultimatum, but the United States, Japan, and the European Union urged both sides to avoid armed conflict and resume peace talks in Tokyo. On 16 May 2003, the government stated that the offer of autonomy was the final concession it would make to GAM, and the rejection of the ultimatum would lead to military operations against the movement. GAM leaders and negotiators responded to this demand, and stated that its members in Aceh had been arrested while trying to leave for Tokyo.

== Military operations ==
After midnight on 18 May 2003, President Megawati Sukarnoputri gave the 12th Indonesian Military Chief, General Endriartono Sutarto, permission to commence military operations against the separatists. General Sutarto also imposed martial law in Aceh for a period of six months and the Indonesian government subsequently deployed 1,500 soldiers and 12,000 police to the province. This included a parachute landing by 458 paratroopers near Aceh airport.

In June 2003, the government announced their intention to print a new ID card to distinguish all the people in Aceh from the rebels. NGOs and aid agencies were ordered to stop operations and leave the area and the government decreed that all assistance had to be coordinated through the government in Jakarta and the Indonesian Red Cross.

In May 2004, martial law in Aceh came to an end and the status of the conflict was downgraded to a civil emergency. Indonesian Coordinating Minister ad interim Hari Sabarno announced the change after a cabinet meeting on 13 May 2004. The government announced that they had made significant progress, and that during the operation thousands of GAM members had been killed, captured and surrendered.

Although martial law had been suspended, the military operations being conducted by the military continued. An estimated 2,000 people were killed during the fighting. According to Indonesian military sources, the majority of victims were soldiers, but international human rights groups and locals, including the government's human rights commission, claim that most of the victims were civilians. Evidence suggests that the military often does not distinguish between combatants, and non-combatants. Investigations also found GAM were responsible for the atrocities that occurred in Aceh. Acehnese refugees in Malaysia have reported widespread abuses in Aceh, which was closed to observers during the military operation. The trial of members of the Indonesian military is considered difficult and trials that have occurred have only involved low-ranking soldiers.

In October 2004, President Susilo Bambang Yudhoyono (SBY) and Vice President Jusuf Kalla were inaugurated following Indonesia's first-ever direct presidential election. Although they had served in the previous administration, they adopted a different approach to the Aceh conflict. Just months into their term, the tsunami struck Aceh, presenting President Yudhoyono with a new challenge: a humanitarian disaster alongside the ongoing conflict. Without hesitation, he announced a unilateral ceasefire between the TNI (Indonesian National Armed Forces) and GAM (Free Aceh Movement) a few days after the disaster. While this strategy initially met with some opposition regarding the handling of the tragedy, he remained steadfast in his plan; ultimately, the move was welcomed by GAM, paving the way for peace negotiations and allowing the Indonesian government to focus more effectively on addressing the humanitarian crisis in Aceh.

== See also ==
- Insurgency in Aceh
- Helsinki Agreement (Aceh)
- Ersa Siregar
