= Mureu =

Coordinates: 5°25′N 95°29′E

Mureu is a village in Aceh Besar district, Indonesia. The village is known as a place where Teungku Chik di Tiro Muhammad Saman, an Indonesian national hero and former GAM leader Hasan Tiro buried side by side. Mureu is located roughly 1,123 mi (1,807 km) to the northwest of the country's capital, Jakarta.
