= Insurgency in Aceh =

1976–2005 conflict in Sumatra, Indonesia

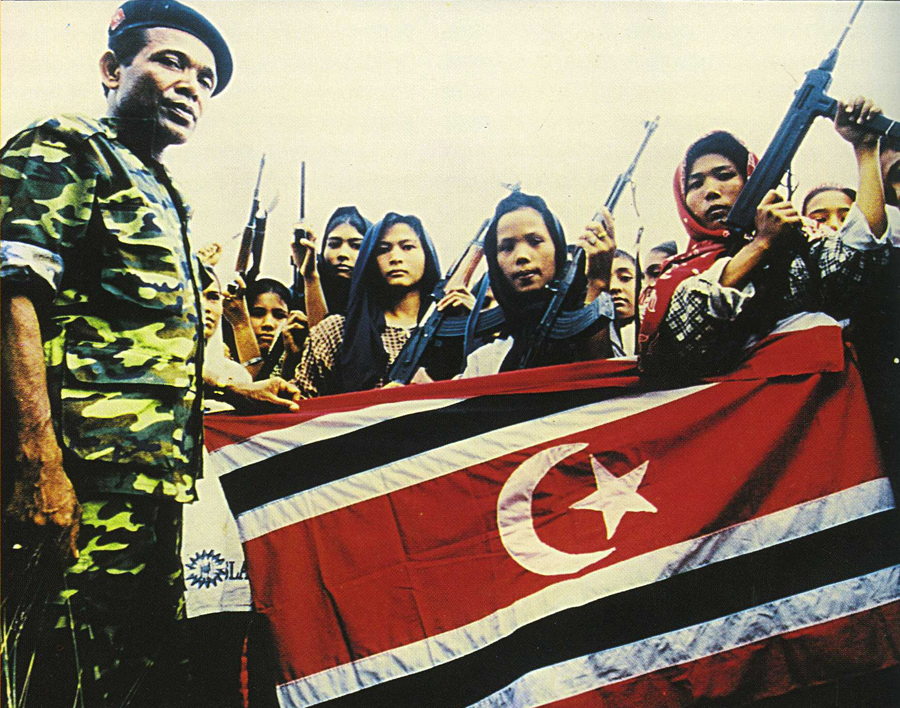
- Female soldiers of the Free Aceh Movement with GAM commander Abdullah Syafi'i, 1999.
Date	4 December 1976 – 15 August 2005 (28 years, 8 months, 1 week and 4 days)
Location	Aceh, Indonesia
Result	Indonesian victory; Helsinki peaceful Memorandum of Understanding; Special autonomy granted to Aceh; Disarmament of the GAM; Departure of non-organic Indonesian troops, leaving only 25,000 soldiers in the province; Aceh Monitoring Mission; Regional elections held

Belligerents
Indonesia; Indonesian National Armed Forces; Indonesian National Police	Free Aceh Movement

Commanders and leaders
Suharto (1976–1998); B. J. Habibie (1998–1999); Abdurrahman Wahid (1999–2001); Megawati Sukarnoputri (2001–2004); Susilo Bambang Yudhoyono (2004–2005); Try Sutrisno; Endriartono Sutarto; Sutiyoso; Bambang Darmono; Da'i Bachtiar	Hasan Tiro; Malik Mahmud; Zaini Abdullah; Teungku Lah †; Muzakir Manaf; Sofyan Dawood; Ayah Muni †; Ishak Daud †; Abu Arafah †

Strength
12,000 (1990); 30,000 (2001) (Indonesia) 15,000 (2002); 35,000–50,000 (2003)	25 (1976); 200 (1979–1989); 750 (1991); 15,000–27,000 (1999); 3,000 (2005)

Casualties and losses
147 killed	Civilians and military killed: 100 (1976–1979); 2,000–10,000 (1991–1992); 393 (1993); 1,041 (2000); 1,700 (2001); 1,230 (2002) Total: 15,000 total killed

The insurgency in Aceh, officially designated the Rebellion in Aceh (Indonesian: Pemberontakan di Aceh) by the Indonesian government, was a conflict fought by the Free Aceh Movement (GAM) between 1976 and 2005, with the goal of making the province of Aceh independent from Indonesia. The aftermath of a military offensive in 2003 and the 2004 Indian Ocean earthquake and tsunami brought a peace agreement and an eventual end to the insurgency.

== Background ==
Location of Aceh in Indonesia

There is a cultural and religious difference between Aceh and the rest of Indonesia. A more conservative form of Islam is practised in Aceh than the rest of Indonesia. The broadly secular policies of Suharto's New Order regime (1965–1998) were especially unpopular in Aceh where many resented the central government's policy of promoting a unified 'Indonesian culture'. Further, given the location of the province at the northern end of Indonesia, there is a widespread feeling in the province that leaders in distant Jakarta do not understand Aceh's problems and have little or no sympathy for local needs and customs in Aceh.

== Timeline ==
=== First phase ===
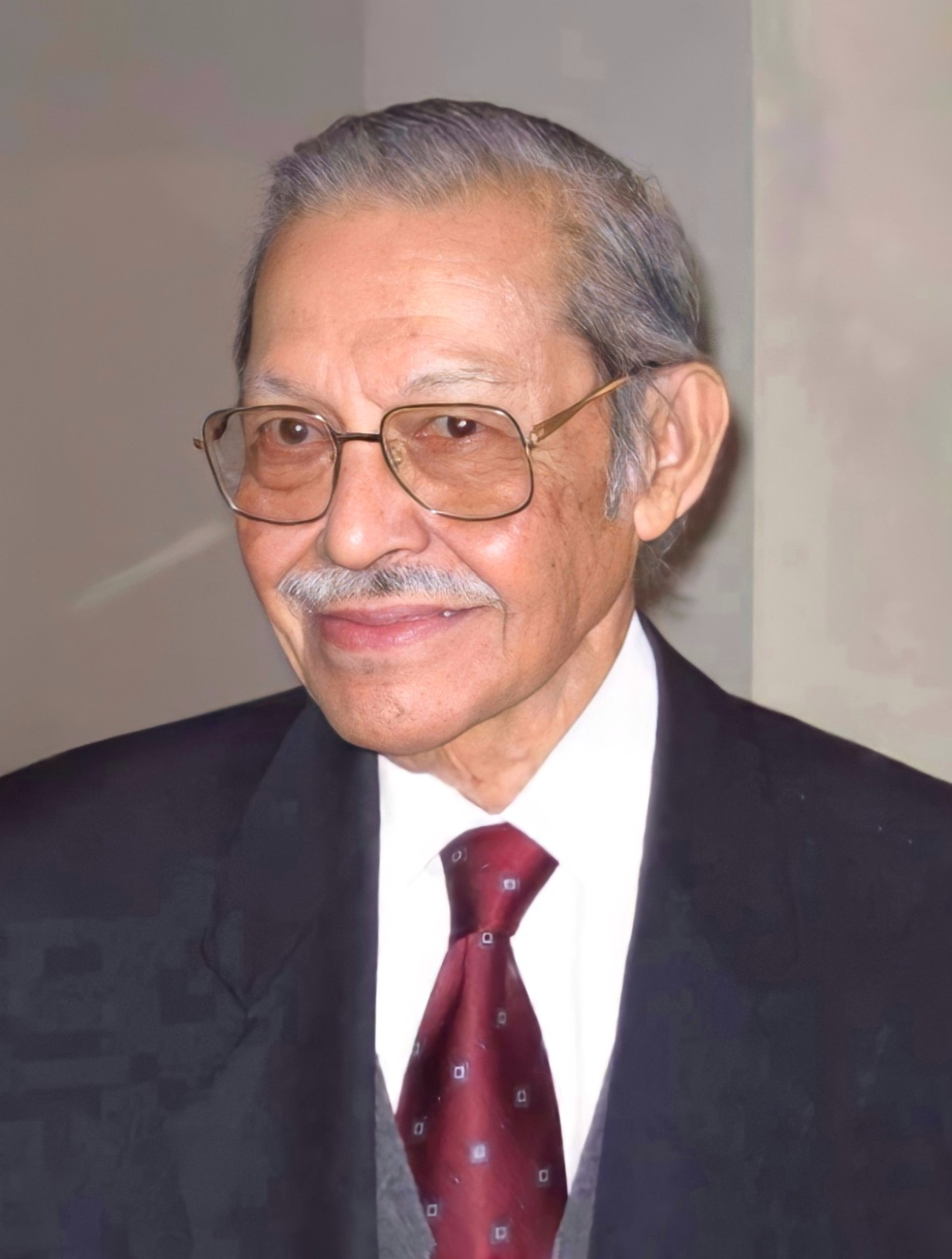
Hasan Tiro, leader of the Free Aceh Movement

The centralist tendencies of the government of Suharto, along with other grievances, led Hasan Tiro to form the Free Aceh Movement (GAM) on 4 December 1976 and declare Acehnese independence. The main perceived threats were to Acehnese religion and culture from the "neo-colonial" government and the rising numbers of Javanese migrants into Aceh. The perceived unfair distribution of income from Aceh's substantial natural resources was another point of contention. GAM's first operation in 1977 was carried out against Mobil Oil Indonesia which was the shareholder of PT Arun, the company which operated the Arun gas field.

At this stage, the numbers mobilised by GAM were extremely limited. While there had been considerable Acehnese disaffection and possibly sympathy for GAM's cause, this did not translate into mass active participation. By di Tiro's own account, only 70 men joined him and they came mostly from the regency of Pidie and especially from di Tiro's own village—with some of them joining due to personal loyalties to the di Tiro family while others due to disillusionment with the central government. Many of GAM's leaders were young and highly educated professionals who were members of the upper and middle classes of Acehnese society.

GAM's first cabinet, set up by di Tiro during his time in Aceh between 1976 and 1979, composed of the following Darul Islam rebellion:

- Hasan Tiro: Wali Negara, Defence Minister, and supreme commander
- Muchtar Hasbi: vice-president; Minister of Internal Affairs
- Muhamad Usman Lampoih Awe: Minister of Finance
- Ilyas Leube: Minister of Justice
- Husaini M. Hasan: Minister of Education and Information
- Zaini Abdullah: Minister of Health
- Zubir Mahmud: Minister of Social Affairs
- Asnawi Ali: Minister of Public Works and Industry
- Amir Ishak: Minister of Communications
- Amir Rashid Mahmud: Minister of Trade
- Malik Mahmud: Minister of State

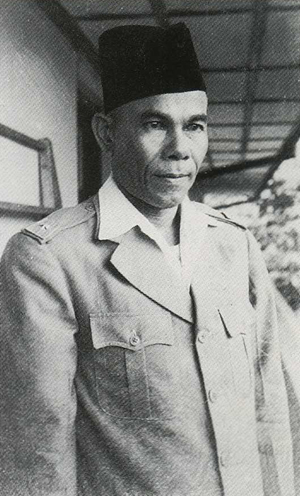
Teungku Daud Beureueh

The mid-level and rank-and-file had fought in the 1953–1959 Darul Islam rebellion. Many of them were older men who remained loyal to former Aceh military governor and leader of the Darul Islam rebellion in Aceh Daud Beureueh. The most prominent person of this group was Teungku Ilyas Leube, a well-known cleric who had been a leader of the Darul Islam rebellion. Some of the Darul Islam men were possibility linked to di Tiro through family or regional ties but they owed their loyalty primarily to Beureueh. These men provided the military know-how, local knowledge and logistical skills which the young educated leaders lacked.

By the end of 1979, Indonesian suppression actions had all but crushed GAM—its leaders were either in exile, imprisoned, or killed; its followers were dispersed and pushed underground. Leaders such as di Tiro, Zaini Abdullah (GAM minister of health), Malik Mahmud (GAM minister of state), and Husaini M. Hasan (GAM minister of education) had fled overseas and the original GAM cabinet ceased to function.

=== Second phase ===
In 1985, di Tiro secured Libyan support for GAM—taking advantage of Muammar Gaddafi's policy of supporting nationalist rebellions through his so-called Mathaba Against Imperialism, Racism, Zionism and Fascism. It was not clear if Libya had subsequently funded GAM but what it definitely provided was a sanctuary in which GAM recruits could receive much-needed military training. Accounts differ on the number of fighters trained by Libya during the period of 1986 to 1989 or 1990. GAM recruiters claimed that there were around 1,000 to 2,000 while press reports drawing from Indonesian military's report claimed that they numbered 600 to 800. Among the GAM leaders who joined during this phase were Sofyan Dawood (who would become GAM commander Pasè, North Aceh) and Ishak Daud (who became the spokesman for GAM Peureulak, East Aceh).

Incidents in the second phase began in 1989 after the return of the trainees from Libya. Operations by GAM included raiding for weapons, attacks against police and military posts, arsons and targeted assassinations of police and military personnel, government informants and other individuals.

Although it failed to gain widespread support, the group's actions led the Indonesian government to institute repressive measures. The period between 1989 and 1998 became known as the "Military Operation Area" or Daerah Operasi Militer (DOM) era as the Indonesian military stepped up its counter-insurgency measures. This measure, although tactically successful in destroying GAM as a guerilla force, alienated the local Acehnese which helped GAM re-establish itself when Indonesian military was almost totally withdrawn from Aceh by the order of president Habibie in late-1998. Important GAM commanders were either killed (Pasè district commander Yusuf Ali and senior GAM commander Keuchik Umar), captured (Ligadinsyah Ibrahim) or fled (Robert, Arjuna and Daud Kandang).

=== Third phase ===
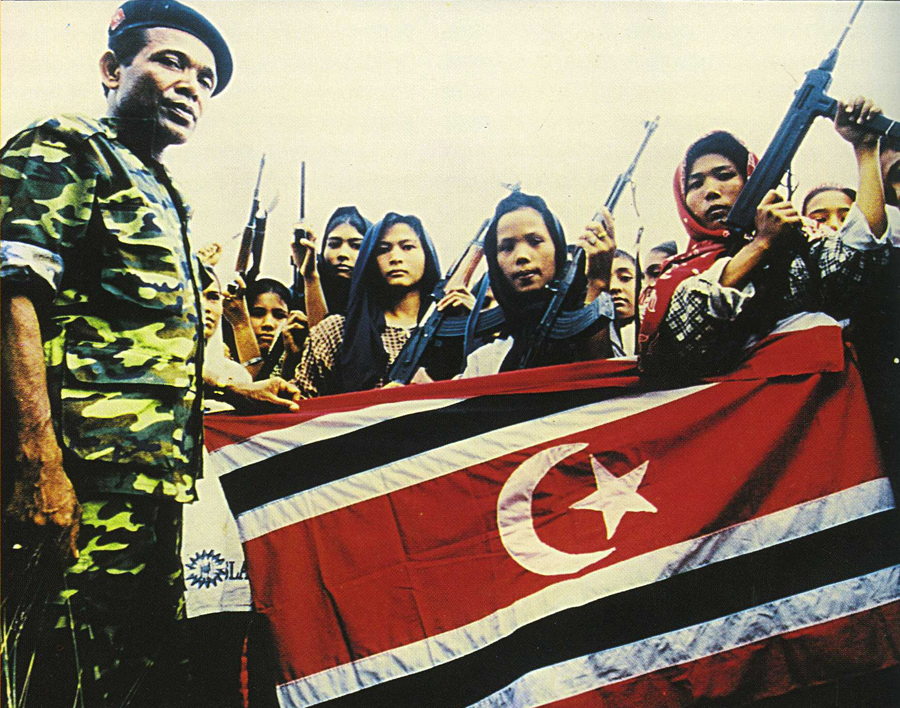
Women soldiers from the Free Aceh Movement with GAM Commander Teungku Lah, 1999.

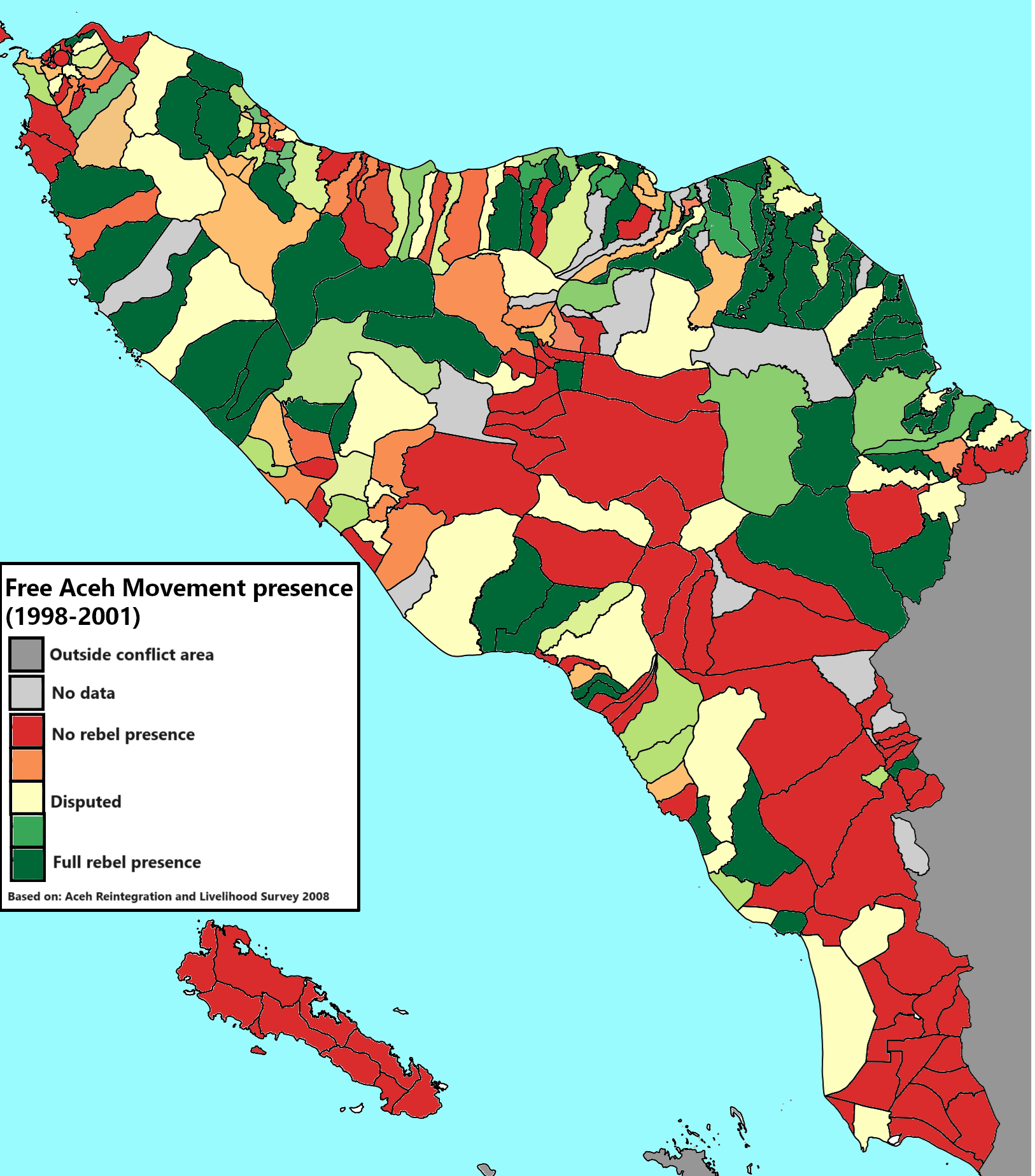
Map of presence of Free Aceh Movement, 1998–2001

In 1999, chaos in Java and an ineffective central government due to the fall of Suharto gave an advantage to Free Aceh Movement and resulted in the second phase of the rebellion, this time with large support from the Acehnese people. In 1999 a troop withdrawal was announced, but the deteriorating security situation led to re-introduction of more soldiers. Troop numbers were believed to have risen during President Megawati Sukarnoputri's term in office (2001–2004) to around 15,000 by mid-2002. GAM was able to control 70 percent of the countryside in all of Aceh.

The year 1999 also saw the start of the first ever dialogue process between the Indonesian Government and GAM. This process was initiated by the Centre for Humanitarian Dialogue (HD) a private diplomacy organization that facilitated peace talks between the two sides until 2003.

During this phase, there were two periods of brief cessation of hostilities brokered by HD: the "Humanitarian Pause" in 2000 and the "Cessation of Hostilities Agreement" (COHA). The COHA was signed in December 2002. The implementation of both the Humanitarian Pause and the COHA resulted in a reduction of armed clashes and violence in Aceh. The COHA ended in May 2003 when the Indonesian government declared a "military emergency" in Aceh and announced that it wanted to destroy GAM once and for all.

In a break from its emphasis on military means of attaining independence, GAM shifted its position to one supporting the holding of a referendum. During 8 November 1999 pro-referendum demonstrations in Banda Aceh, GAM gave support by providing transport to protesters from rural areas to the provincial capital. On 21 July 2002, GAM also issued the Stavanger Declaration following a meeting of the Worldwide Acehnese Representatives Meeting in Stavanger, Norway. In the declaration, it declared that the "State of Aceh practices the system of democracy." Aspinall saw that these democratic and human rights impulses within GAM as an effect of the efforts of urban-based Acehnese group which were promoting such values in the freer and more open environment following the fall of Suharto from power. Security crackdowns in 2001 and 2002 resulted in several thousand civilian deaths. Throughout the conflict an estimated 15,000 people have been killed. The government launched an offensive and a state of emergency was proclaimed in the Province. During this period, the GAM was severely disabled with its commander Teungku Lah killed in a government ambush in January 2002, while various regional commanders such as Tengku Jamaica and Ishak Daud were also killed. By GAM's own admission, it lost 50% of its strength during the government offensive of 2003–2005. The insurgency was still going on when the tsunami disaster of 2004 struck the province. In November 2003 the martial law was extended for a further six months. According to a Human Rights Watch report, the Indonesian military committed widespread human rights abuses during the invasion and occupation, with more than 100,000 people being displaced in the first seven months of martial law and extrajudicial killings being common.

=== The peace agreement and first local elections ===
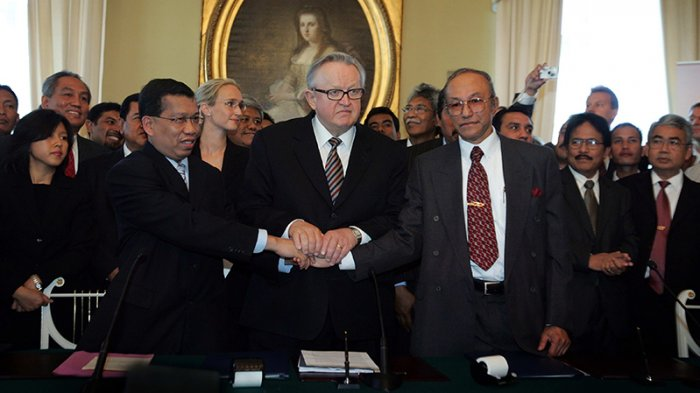
Agreement to end Insurgency in Aceh signed in Helsinki, 2005

After the devastating tsunami in December 2004, GAM declared a unilateral cease-fire, with members of the international community reiterating the need to resolve the conflict. Of the numerous accounts of the negotiation process, one from the Indonesian side is in the book by the Indonesian key negotiator, Hamid Awaludin. A differing account was written by GAM adviser, Damien Kingsbury: 'Peace in Aceh: A Personal Account of the Aceh Peace Process Despite GAM's unilateral ceasefire, the TNI continued its assault on GAM personnel and positions. Because of the separatist movement in the area, the Indonesian government had access restrictions in place on the press and aid workers. After the tsunami, however, the Indonesian government opened the region up to international relief efforts. The tsunami drew international attention to the conflict. Earlier peace efforts had failed, but for a number of reasons, including the tsunami, the inability of either side to militarily win the conflict and, notably, a desire by President Susilo Bambang Yudhoyono to secure peace in Indonesia, a peace agreement was reached in 2005 after 29 years of war. Post-Suharto Indonesia and the liberal-democratic reform period, as well as changes in the Indonesian military, helped create an environment more favourable to peace talks. The roles of newly elected President Susilo Bambang Yudhoyono and Vice-President Jusuf Kalla were highly significant. At the same time, the GAM leadership was reconsidering options available to it, and the Indonesian military had put the rebel movement under significant pressure that encouraged GAM to accept an outcome short of full independence. The peace talks were facilitated by the Crisis Management Initiative and led by former Finnish President Martti Ahtisaari. The resulting peace agreement was signed on 15 August 2005 in Helsinki. Under the agreement, Aceh would receive special autonomy under the Republic of Indonesia, and non-organic (i.e. non-Aceh native) government troops would be withdrawn from the province (leaving only 25,000 soldiers) in exchange for GAM's disarmament. As part of the agreement, the European Union dispatched 300 monitors. Their mission expired on 15 December 2006, following local elections. Aceh has been granted broader autonomy through Aceh Government Legislation covering special rights agreed upon in 2002 as well as the right of the Acehnese to establish local political parties to represent their interests. However, Human rights advocates highlighted that previous human rights violations in the province would need to be addressed.

During elections for the provincial governor held in December 2006, the former GAM and national parties participated. The election was won by Irwandi Yusuf, whose base of support consists largely of ex-GAM members.

== Possible causes of conflict ==
=== Historical ===
The area first fell to Dutch authority as a result of the Dutch expedition on the west coast of Sumatra of 1831. However, not everything fell into Dutch hands, where resistance was still being carried out. Aceh Sultanate as a whole was only defeated in 1903, becoming one of the last areas conquered by the Dutch in the Malay Archipelago.

Australian National University (ANU) academic Edward Aspinall argued that the historical experience of Aceh during the Indonesian National Revolution led to a "path-dependent" development for Acehnese separatism – i.e. past events lead to a narrowing of the possibilities for subsequent development. He argued:

Acehnese rebelliousness under Indonesian rule was path dependent; it can be traced to particular historical events and conflicts of interest, notably the autonomy that the modernist ulama [Muslim religious scholars] enjoyed during the revolution and the dramatic loss of it immediately after.

Aspinall argued further that there were two milestones for the "path-dependent" development of Aceh separatism:

1945–1949: Aceh played an important role in the revolution against the Dutch and consequently was allegedly able to extract a promise from then-President Sukarno during his 1947 visit to Aceh that it would be allowed to implement Islamic family law (or syariah) following independence.

1953–1962: Aceh military governor Daud Beureueh declared that the province would secede from Republik Indonesia (RI) to join the Negara Islam Indonesia (NII) in reaction to the refusal of then-President Sukarno and the central government to allow the implementation of syariah and the downgrading of Aceh from the status of a province. Sukarno have further stated that he rejected sharia law in all of Indonesia for the sake of national unity. This rebellion which Aceh was a part of came to be known as the Darul Islam Rebellion. Aspinall argued that the failure of this rebellion marked the end of Acehnese identification with a pan-Indonesian/Islamic cause and laid the groundwork for particularism.

The above argument by Aspinall contradicted the views of earlier scholars. Earlier in 1998, Geoffrey Robinson argued that the 1962 defeat and surrender of the Daud Beureueh-led rebellion was followed by roughly 15 years in which Aceh presented no particular security or political problem to the central government. Tim Kell also pointed out that the former leaders of the 1953–62 rebellion had keenly joined the Indonesian armed forces in the crackdown against the Partai Komunis Indonesia (PKI) in 1965 and 1966.

=== Religion ===
Aceh like most of Indonesia, had Muslims as the majority religious group. However, it is generally acknowledged that it was the region where Islam first entered into the Malay archipelago. The first known Islamic kingdom was Pasai (near present-day Lhokseumawe in northern Aceh) which dates back to the mid-13th century. The earliest found archaeological evidence to support this view was the tomb stone of Sultan Malik ul Salih who died in 1297. In the centuries that followed, Pasai became known as a centre for Islamic learning and a model for Islamic governance in which other Islamic kingdoms look to for guidance. Part of the distinct Acehnese identity would stem from its status as the earliest Islamic region and the exemplar for the rest of the Malay archipelago.

This separateness from the rest of Indonesia where Islam is concerned could be observed from the formation of the Persatuan Ulama Seluruh Aceh (PUSA) in 1939 by modernist Islamic scholars (or ulama). The organisation was exclusively Acehnese. It was noted that in Aceh itself, most pan-Indonesian mass organisations had been weak—even the Muhammadiyah, the main organisation for modernist-oriented Muslims in Indonesia failed to make inroads in Aceh beyond urban areas and was largely non-Acehnese in its membership. However, it was also noted that though PUSA was parochial in its orientation, it nonetheless still identified with a pan-Islamic cause where the goal was for all Muslims to be united under the syariah.

Another factor of the religious cause for Aceh's separatism was the treatment of Muslim groups and political parties in Aceh by President Suharto's Orde Baru regime. First, there was the forced fusion of all political parties representing Muslim interests into the Partai Persatuan Pembangunan (PPP) or United Development Party in 1973. Members and followers of Islamic political parties in Aceh suffered from varying degrees of harassment. Despite Aceh's special territory status, it was not allowed to implement syariah nor to integrate Islamic religious schools (madrasah) with mainstream national schools for a unified education system—both proposals were ignored by the central government.

Despite Indonesia being a Muslim majority state, building on Aceh's existing self-conception of its role in Islam and the Orde Baru's hostile attitude towards Islamic forms of societal influence, GAM was able to frame the struggle against the Indonesian government as a "prang sabi" (holy war) in much the same way the term was used in the Infidel War (or Aceh War) against the Dutch from 1873 to 1913. An indication of this was the use of the words of Hikayat Prang Sabi (Tales of Holy War), a collection of tales used to inspire resistance against the Dutch, by some elements of GAM as propaganda against the Indonesian government. Before the second wave of insurrections by GAM in the late-1980s, it was observed that some individuals had forced Acehnese school children to sing the Hikayat Prang Sabi instead of Indonesia's national anthem, Indonesia Raya. GAM political publicity material also painted the official state ideology of Pancasila as a "polytheistic teaching".

Notwithstanding the above, it was observed that in the aftermath of the fall of Suharto in 1998, religion as a factor for Aceh separatism began to subside even if there had been a proliferation of Muslim student unions and other groups in Aceh. It was noted that these newly-emerged groups rarely called for the implementation of syariah in Aceh. Instead, they emphasised the need for a referendum on Aceh's independence and highlighted the human rights abuses and misconduct of the Indonesian Armed Forces (TNI). Similarly, GAM's position on syariah also shifted. When the central government passed the Law No. 44/1999 on Aceh Autonomy which included provisions for the implementation of syariah, GAM condemned the move as irrelevant and a possible attempt to deceive Acehnese and or portray them to the outside world as religious fanatics. Despite the official stance on syariah, GAM's position was not a clear cut one. It was noted by the International Crisis Group (ICG) that between 1999 and 2001, there were periodic instances of some GAM local military commanders enforcing syariah in communities where they had influence in. Aspinall also observed that overall, the evolution of GAM's position vis-a-via syariah and Islam was dependent on the international environment and which countries it targeted for support in its cause for independence – i.e. if western countries were deemed important, Islam was de-emphasised and if Muslim countries were deemed important, Islam would be emphasised.

=== Economic grievances ===
The main issue pertaining to economic grievances were related to the revenues derived from the oil and gas industries in Aceh. Robinson argued that the Orde Baru's management and exploitation of Aceh's resources and the way it distributed the benefits was the root cause of the insurgency. From the 1970s to the mid-1980s, Aceh had undergone a "LNG boom" following the discovery natural gas on the northeast coast of Aceh. Over the same period, Aceh became a major source of revenue for the central government and in the 1980s, it contributed significantly to Indonesia's exports when it became the third largest source of exports after the provinces of East Kalimantan and Riau. Despite this, practically all oil and gas revenues from production and exports activities in Aceh was appropriated by the central government either directly or through production sharing agreements with state oil company Pertamina. Furthermore, the central government did not re-invest a fair amount of the revenues back into the province. This led some of Aceh's then-emerging technocratic class to lament that the province had been denied its fair share of the economic pie and that it had been marginalised as an ignored peripheral region.

Robinson noted that though some of Aceh's small but burgeoning business class had benefited from the influx of foreign capital during the LNG boom, there were many who felt aggrieved at losing out to others with good political connections to the central government—most notably, the leader of GAM himself, Hasan Tiro was one such aggrieved party when he made a bid for an oil pipeline contract for Mobile Oil Indonesia in 1974 but lost out to a US company. He further noted that the timing of GAM's declaration of independence in December 1976 and its first military action in 1977 happened at roughly the same time that Aceh's first natural gas extraction and processing facility had opened. Indeed, in GAM's declaration of independence, the following claim was made:

Acheh, Sumatra has been producing a revenue of over 15 billion US dollars yearly for the Javanese neocolonialists, which they used totally for the benefit of Java and the Javanese.

Despite the above, Robinson noted that while this factor partly explained the emergence of the insurgency in the mid-1970s, they do not appear to explain the re-emergence of GAM in 1989 and the never-before seen levels of violence thereafter. Aspinall supports this viewpoint and argued that though resource and economic grievances should not be discounted, they were not decisive as the provinces of Riau and East Kalimantan both faced similar or even harsher exploitation by the central government but no separatist rebellions took place in those two provinces due to the difference in political conditions. He furthered that the resource-based grievance was a means for GAM to convince Acehnese that they should abandon hopes of special treatment and autonomy within Indonesia and instead work for the restoration of Aceh's glory by seeking independence.

=== Role of GAM in galvanising grievances ===
GAM's founder Hasan Tiro and his fellow leaders in exile in Sweden were instrumental in providing a coherent message on both the necessity and right of self-determination for Aceh. Accordingly, arguments on the need for independence was targeted at the domestic Acehnese audience while the right to independence was targeted at the international audience to win diplomatic support.

In such propaganda, the defunct Aceh Sultanate was cast as a bona fide sovereign actor on the international stage with emphasis on the sultanate's past relations with European states – diplomatic missions, treaties as well as statements of recognition of Aceh's sovereignty. In accordance to this logic, an independent Aceh (as represented by GAM) would be the successor state to the Aceh Sultanate before defeat by the Dutch following the Aceh War (1873–1913). The Aceh War was thus seen as an unlawful act of aggression by the Dutch and the subsequent incorporation of Aceh into Indonesia in 1949 was cast as an extension of the unlawful occupation by the Dutch. This argument targeted at both the Acehnese themselves as well as the international community—i.e. through its appeal to international law.

In the same vein, the state of Indonesia was cast by GAM propaganda as a cover for Javanese domination. In di Tiro's own description:

"Indonesia" was a fraud. A cloak to cover up Javanese colonialism. Since the world begun [sic], there never was a people, much less a nation, in our part of the world by that name.

The efforts at spreading GAM propaganda relied much on word of mouth. Elizabeth Drexler had observed that ordinary Acehnese and GAM supporters often repeat the same claims made in GAM's propaganda which they had come into contact with through this mode of dissemination. The late M. Isa Sulaiman wrote that when di Tiro first started his secessionist activities between 1974 and 1976, he had relied on a network of relatives and a number of like-minded young intellectuals to spread his message—which gained traction especially in Medan, North Sumatra. Aspinall also wrote of GAM sympathizers' recollection of the early days of the insurrection in which they would pass pamphlets to friends or slide them anonymously under the doors of their colleagues' offices.

The results of the propaganda efforts were however quite mixed. Eric Morris when interviewing GAM supporters for his 1983 thesis noted that, rather than independence, they were more interested in either an Indonesian Islamic state or for Aceh to be treated more fairly by the central government. Aspinall also noted that for some, GAM did not clearly differentiate itself from Darul Islam or the United Development Party which was campaigning on an Islamic platform for the Indonesian legislative election in 1977. For individuals who had become core supporters however, the message of independence found in GAM's propaganda was seen as revelatory and many saw felt a moment of awakening.

== Possible factors for prolonged conflict ==
=== Resilience of GAM's network ===
Many of the participants of GAM were either participants of the Darul Islam rebellion or were the sons of those who had. Aspinall noted that the kinship ties, between father and son as well as amongst brothers, had been crucial to GAM's solidarity as an organisation. Many felt that they were continuing the aspirations of either their fathers, uncles, brothers or male cousins who were usually the ones who inducted them into the organisation—or whose exploits or deaths at the hands of the state security apparatus had inspired them to join. GAM's constituents were also often residents in close-knit rural communities where everybody knew their neighbours well. These features enabled both continuity as well as a high-degree of resistance to infiltration by the state intelligence apparatus.

Aspinall also credited GAM's resilience on the cell-like structure at the lower levels. At the levels below the regional military commander (panglima wilayah) were units commanded by junior commanders (panglima muda) and even lower level commanders (panglima sagoe and ulee sagoe) who did not know the identities of their counterparts in neighbouring regions and only knew those directly above them. These allowed GAM to survive as an organisation despite the suppression efforts of the Indonesian state.

=== Human rights abuses by Indonesian military ===
Robinson argued that the institutionalised use of terror by the Indonesian military in counter-insurgency action against GAM under the late-Orde Baru period from the middle of 1990 (i.e. in the second phase of the insurrection) had led to a wider section of Acehnese being affected and pushed them to be more sympathetic and supportive of GAM. He assessed that such methods had the effect of escalating the level of violence, was disruptive of Acehnese society and inflicted wounds on them which proved difficult to heal. As Amnesty International noted:

The political authority of the armed forces, considerable even under normal conditions, now became unchallengeable. In the name of national security, military and police authorities deployed in Aceh were thereafter free to use virtually any means deemed necessary to destroy the GPK (Gerakan Pengacauan Keamanan or Security Disturbance Movement, which was the Indonesian government's nomenclature for GAM).

Amnesty International documented the use of arbitrary arrests, extra-legal detention, summary executions, rape and scorch-earth as features of the Indonesian military's push against GAM since 1990. Among the more chilling acts observed by Amnesty International was the public disposal of the bodies of victims of summary executions or Petrus Killings (Penembakan Misterius) to serve as warnings to Acehnese to refrain from joining or supporting GAM. The following was Amnesty International's description of such acts:

The "mysterious killings" (Petrus) in Aceh had the following general features. The corpses of victims were usually left in public places – beside a main road, in fields and plantations, next to a stream or a river – apparently as a warning to others not to join or support the rebels. Most had clearly been prisoners when they were killed, their thumbs, and sometimes their feet, had been tied together with a particular type of knot. Most had been shot at close range, though the bullets were seldom found in their bodies. Most also showed signs of having been beaten with a blunt instrument or tortured, and their faces were therefore often unrecognisable. For the most part, the bodies were not recovered by relatives or friends, both out of fear of retribution by the military and because the victims were usually dumped at some distance from their home villages.

Another questionable tactic of the TNI was the so-called civil-military operations in which civilians were compelled to participate in intelligence and security operations. A notorious example of this was the Operasi Pagar Betis (or "Fence of Legs") as described by Amnesty International below:

...the strategy of civil-military co-operation was the "fence of legs" operation – used previously in East Timor – in which ordinary villagers were compelled to sweep through an area ahead of armed troops, in order both to flush out rebels and to inhibit them from returning fire. Essential to the success of these operations were local "vigilante" groups and night patrols made up of civilians but established under military order and supervision. Between 20 and 30 young men were mobilised from each village in suspected rebel areas. In the words of a local military commander: "The youths are the front line. They know best who the GPK are. We then settle the matter." Refusal to participate in these groups – or failure to demonstrate sufficient commitment to crushing the enemy by identifying, capturing or killing alleged rebels – sometimes resulted in punishment by government forces, including public torture, arrest and execution.

=== Indonesian military's interests in Aceh ===
Damien Kingsbury, who served as adviser to the GAM leadership in Stockholm and Helsinki during the Helsinki peace talks in 2005, contended that the Indonesian military had vested interests to keep the conflict at a level which would justify their presence in the restive province. The ICG also asserted in a 2003 report that, "Aceh is simply too lucrative a place for military officers who rely so heavily on non-budgetary sources of income."

Kingsbury and Lesley McCulloch outlined the following business activities allegedly conducted by the Indonesian military in Aceh:

- Drugs: Security forces encouraged local farmers to grow marijuana and paid them prices far below the black market value. One instance highlighted was a police helicopter pilot admitting after his arrest that he was flying a 40 kg consignment of the drug for his superior the police chief of Aceh Besar (note that at this point the Indonesian Police or Polri was under the command of the military). Another case was in September 2002 in which an army truck was intercepted by the police in Binjai, North Sumatra with a cargo of 1,350 kg of marijuana.
- Illegal arms sale: Interviews in 2001 and 2002 with GAM leaders in Aceh revealed that some of their weapons were in fact purchased from the military. The first method of such sales was for the Indonesian military personnel to report those weapons sold as having been seized during combat. Secondly, key Indonesian military personnel with access had even directly provided GAM with a reliable supply of weapons as well as ammunition.
- Illegal/unlicensed logging: Military and police were paid by logging companies to ignore logging activities which took place outside of licensed areas. The Leuser Development Project funded by the European Union from the mid-1990s to combat illegal logging had in fact discovered that the Indonesian military and police who were supposed to assist in preventing illegal logging were in fact facilitating and, in some cases, even initiating such illegal activities.
- Protection: The military ran "protection rackets" to extract payments from companies such as Mobil and PT Arun in the oil and gas industries as well as companies operating plantations in Aceh. In return for the payments, the military would deploy its personnel at the properties and areas of operations of these companies.
- Fishery: Local fisherman were forced to sell to the military their catches at prices far below market rates. The military would in turn sell the fishes to local businesses at a much higher prices. Personnel of the Indonesian Navy might also waylay fishing vessels to extort payments from fishermen.
- Coffee: Similar to fishermen, coffee planters were compelled to sell coffee beans to the military at low prices.

== Possible factors for peaceful resolution ==
=== Weakening of GAM's military position ===
The declaration of martial law by the Indonesian government in May 2003 had resulted in a concerted push by the Indonesian military against GAM. The ICG reported that by mid-2004, GAM's supply lines and communications had been seriously disrupted. It was also more difficult for them to move about, and their presence in urban areas was largely rooted out. As a result, GAM's command in Pidie had instructed all field commanders by telephone to pull back from the sagoe (sub-district) to the daerah (district) base and that henceforth military actions could only be undertaken on the order of the daerah commander and with the permission of the wilayah (regional) commander. Previously, when GAM was in a stronger position, its sagoe level units could exercise a great level of command autonomy to initiate military actions on their own.

According to then Indonesian Armed Forces Commander General Endriartono Sutarto, the security forces succeeded in cutting the size of GAM's forces by 9,593—which presumably included surrenders, captures, and deaths. While doubting that the figure was accurate, most observers would agree that the renewed military push against GAM following the martial law declaration had dealt substantial damage to GAM.

However, Aspinall noted that most GAM leaders whom he had interviewed, particularly the field officers, were adamant that their acceptance of the Helsinki MoU was not due to their military weakness. Former-GAM leader Irwandi Yusuf, who would go on to be the governor of Aceh through its inaugural direct gubernatorial elections on 11 December 2006, ventured that far from collapsing, the situation of GAM was actually improving as the sick and infirm were captured by the Indonesian military which left those still in the field to be unencumbered by them. However, despite the commitment of GAM forces to fight on, GAM's leaders might have, at that point, given up hope that a military victory over the government forces would be possible. In the words of former GAM prime minister Malik Mahmud to Aspinall in October 2005: "The existing strategies applied by both parties had caused a costly stalemate". When asked by The Jakarta Post to comment on whether accepting the Helsinki MoU was a face-saving measure by GAM in the face of military setbacks, Malik said:

Well, we have to be realistic. We have to take into account the reality on the ground. If that [peace agreement] is a solution that's good for both parties, of course with dignity on both sides, why not! This is for the sake of peace, for the sake of future progress. So, there is nothing wrong with that and I think any other country in the world would do the same thing. And also when we come to that kind of situation we have to be very, very decisive and brave to face reality. And that is what we did.

=== International pressure ===
The international opinion following the tsunami also had a bearing on the importance placed on the Helsinki peace talks undertaken by both the Indonesian government and GAM. Both sides had sent senior ranking officials as negotiators while during the Cessation of Hostilities Agreement (CoHA) talks which was signed in December 2002, representation was at a relatively junior level.

GAM leaders had also assessed during the Helsinki peace talks that there was no support from the international community for Aceh's independence aspiration. With regard to this, Malik said:

We saw also that the world kept silent about our move for independence, so we thought during the process [of negotiations] that that [autonomy and self-government] was the best solution that was in front of us.

In explaining to the GAM commanders the acceptance of self-government instead of continuing to struggle for independence, GAM leaders stressed that if they continued to insist on fighting for independence even after the 2004 tsunami, they would risk being isolated by the international community.

=== Change in Indonesian leadership ===
In October 2004, President Susilo Bambang Yudhoyono (SBY) and Vice-President Jusuf Kalla were sworn in following the first ever direct presidential elections in 2004. Aspinall argued that before this, there was a balance between those in the Indonesian government who believed that a military victory was impossible and that negotiations were needed and hardliners who held on to the view that GAM could be entirely eliminated—the election of SBY and Kalla had tipped the balance in favour of the former position.

He pointed out that while SBY was still a minister in the Cabinet of President Megawati Sukarnoputri, he had supported an "integrated approach" in which military measures were accompanied by efforts to negotiate with GAM. Kalla, then a ministerial colleague of SBY's, also supported the restarting of talks with GAM in early-2004 (a time when the martial law in Aceh was still in effect and the military operation was in full swing). During this time, Kalla, through his trusted intermediaries, made approaches to GAM's commanders in the field as well as its leadership in Sweden. The positions of both the president and vice-president of Indonesia in favour of negotiations as a solution to the Aceh insurgency thus provided a platform for the eventual success of the Helsinki peace talks.

Kingsbury, an official advisor to GAM, also credited the election of SBY and Kalla in 2004 as providing the impetus for the peace efforts which led to the eventual agreement. In particular, he pointed out that the appointment of Kalla to oversee the Indonesian delegation for the peace talks was crucial because Kalla's status as the general chairman of Golkar, at that time the largest party in the Indonesian legislature, allowed SBY's government to deal effectively with any opposition coming from the parliament.

== Time to Face the Past report ==
In April 2013, Amnesty International released the Time to Face the Past report in which the organisation states that "most victims and their relatives have long been denied truth, justice and reparation in violation of Indonesia's obligation under international law. They are still waiting for local and national Indonesian authorities to acknowledge and remedy what happened to them and their loved ones during the conflict." For the formulation of the report, Amnesty International employed the findings that it collected during a visit to Aceh in May 2012. During this visit, organisational representatives spoke with non-governmental organisations (NGOs), community organisations, lawyers, parliamentarians, local government officials, journalists, and victims and their representatives about the situation in Aceh at the time of the interviews. While victims expressed their appreciation of the peace process and the increased security in the Aceh province, they conveyed their frustration at the lack of action from the Indonesian government in regard to the 2005 memorandum of understanding (MOU), in which a plan for the setting up of a Human Rights Court for Aceh and an Aceh Truth and Reconciliation Commission is documented.

Moreover, the Time to Face the Past report contains a warning in light of the potential for renewed violence that exists in Aceh if the Indonesian government remains stagnant in relation to its commitments from the 2005 MOU. Amnesty International's deputy Asia Pacific director Isabelle Arradon explained during the launch of the report: "The situation is breeding resentment that could sow the seeds of a future return to violence". As of 19 April 2013, the Indonesian government had not issued a response to the report and a presidential spokesman informed the BBC news service that he was unable to comment as he had not read the report.

== See also ==
- 2004 Indian Ocean earthquake
- Bambang Darmono
- The Black Road
- Simpang KKA incident
