= 1990–1998 Indonesian military operations in Aceh =

- Part of the insurgency in Aceh
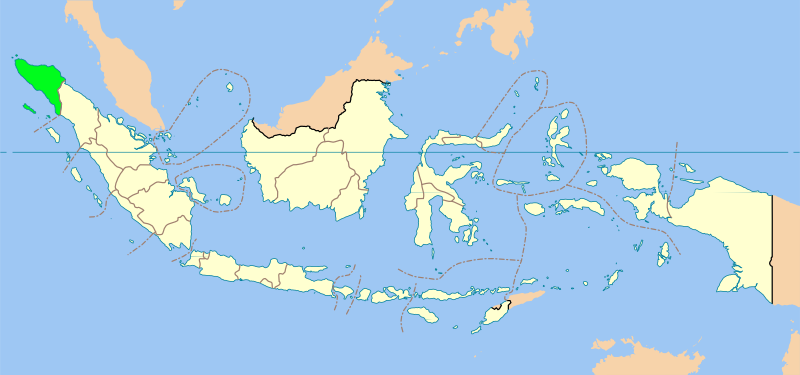
- Location of Aceh in Indonesia
Date	early 1990 – 22 August 1998
Location	Aceh, Indonesia
Result	Withdrawal of all Indonesian National Armed Forces personnel from Aceh

Belligerents
Indonesia; Indonesian National Armed Forces	Free Aceh Movement

Commanders and leaders
Suharto; Try Sutrisno; Sutiyoso	Hasan di Tiro; Abdullah Syafi'i

Casualties and losses
- 9,000–12,000 died mostly civilians

The 1990–1998 Indonesian military operations in Aceh, also known as Operation Red Net (Indonesian: Operasi Jaring Merah) or Military Operation Area (Indonesian: Daerah Operasi Militer/DOM), was launched in early 1990 until 22 August 1998, against the separatist movement of Free Aceh Movement (GAM) in Aceh. During that period, the Indonesian National Armed Forces practiced large-scale and systematic human rights abuses against the Acehnese. The war was characterised as a "dirty war" involving arbitrary executions, kidnapping, torture, mass rape, disappearances, and the torching of villages. Amnesty International called the military operations response as a "shock therapy" for GAM. Villages that were suspected of harboring GAM operatives were burnt down and family members of suspected militants were kidnapped and tortured. Between 9,000 and 12,000 people, mostly civilians, were killed between 1989 and 1998 in the operation.

This operation ended with the withdrawal of almost all ABRI personnel involved on the orders of Indonesia's new president, BJ Habibie, on 22 August 1998 after the fall of President Suharto and the end of the era of New Order regime.

== See also ==
- Insurgency in Aceh
