= Juha Christensen =

Finnish peace activist and negotiator

- Born: 1958 (age 67–68)
- Occupations: Peace activist, negotiator
- Known for: 2005 Aceh peace process

Juha Christensen (born 1958) is a Finnish businessman, philanthropist and negotiator who played an instrumental role in the 2005 Aceh peace process. He was also involved in negotiations leading to the release of Phillip Mark Mehrtens, a New Zealand pilot taken hostage by the West Papua National Liberation Army (TPNPB) during the 2023 Nduga hostage crisis.

== Life ==
Christensen is a former pharmaceutical executive. Before becoming involved in the Aceh peace process, he had lived for several decades in Indonesia, and spoke Indonesian fluently.

== Involvement in Aceh peace process ==
In June 2003 and acting on his own initiative, Christensen went to Stockholm where he initiated discussions with leaders of the Free Aceh Movement. In February 2004 Christensen contacted Martti Ahtisaari, the former President of Finland, who he knew personally, to become involved in peace negotiations. Christensen was also able to connect another old friend, Farid Husain, then the Indonesian Minister of Health, with Ahtisaari and the Finnish CMI (Crisis Management Initiative). Christensen was an active participant in the peace negotiations. As a result of the negotiations that followed, a peace agreement between the parties in conflict was signed in Helsinki on 15 August 2005.

Following the peace agreement, Christensen was a special adviser to the Aceh Monitoring Mission (AMM) until 2006.

In 2015, Christensen negotiated the surrender and disarming of Din Minimi, a former GAM militant, and 30 of his followers east of Banda Aceh.

As of 2017, Christensen is the general manager of Pacta (Architecture Peace and Conflict Transformation Alliance), a Finnish peace organization that he co-founded.

Christensen was invited to join the Asian Peace and Reconciliation Council as a founding member.
