= Shadia Marhaban =

Shadia Marhaban is an international mediator, capacity builder and activist from Aceh, Indonesia.

During the conflict between the Free Aceh Movement and the Indonesian government Shadia Marhaban worked as a journalist and a translator, most famously collaborating with journalist William Nessen on the documentary The Black Road in Aceh. In addition to her work as a journalist and a translator, Shadia Marhaban served as a coordinator at SIRA, an organization dedicated to galvanizing support for a popular referendum on Acehnese independence. In 2001, SIRA organized a peacefully rally in support of a referendum, with 2 million people attending in Banda Aceh. She also worked to build international support for Acehnese self-determination through her work with the peace movement "Moratorium on Dialogue".

In 2003 she fled Indonesia and sought asylum as a political refugee. in the United States. There she continued to work supporting the possibility of a referendum on Acehnese independence. She was the only woman to actively participate in the GAM negotiating team at the 2005 peace negotiations in Finland, which ended the conflict in Aceh. Following the successful negotiation of the peace agreement she returned to Aceh from her exile in the United States, and joined a group of activists to form the Aceh Women’s League (LINA).

Since 2006 Marhaban has worked as LINA’s president. In that capacity she helped LINA's diverse array of community programs, dedicated to empowering Acehnese women to act as agents of change, carrying out trainings for 1400 former female combatants, as well as other vulnerable members of the community. She is also an active participant in the national and international dialogue surrounding issues of women and security.

In 2009, Marhaban delivered a keynote address at a conference in Finland, organized by Crisis Management International, devoted to "Gender and Mediation – how to improve women’s role in peace negotiations." In 2010, she presented at conference held in Bogotá, Colombia, dedicated to “Designing an Innovative Peace Process," organized by the Berghof Conflict Research Center. In addition to her work at LINA, and her presence in the international arena, Marhaban serves as a founding board member for the School of Peace and Democracy in Aceh.

In 2011 she became Fellow of the Weatherhead Center for International Affairs at Harvard University. and since 2012 she works as a National Consultant for the UN Women Indonesia for West Papua. She is also a consultant for women involvement in peace processes for many governments and NGOs in Southeast Asians regions, among which Southern Thailand, Mindanao (Philippines), Timor-Leste, Myanmar but also Nepal and Afghanistan.
