= Helsinki Agreement (Aceh) =

Peace Agreement between Indonesia and GAM (Aceh Freedom Movement)

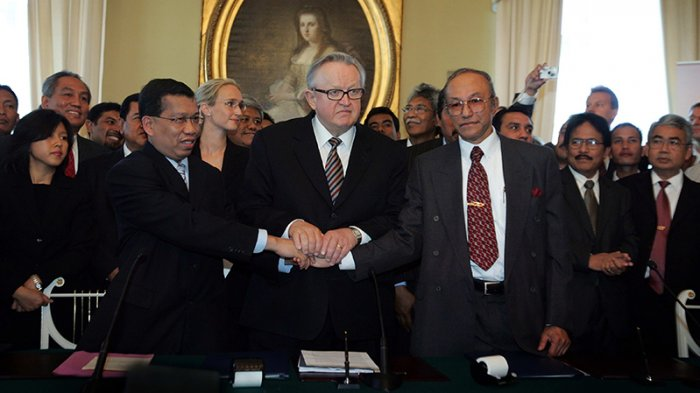
- Hamid Awaluddin and Malik Mahmud shook hands after signing the Helsinki Agreement mediated by former Finnish President, Martti Ahtisaari.
- Type: Political Agreement
- Signed: 15 August 2005
- Location: Smolna, Helsinki, Finland
- Mediators: Martti Ahtisaari
- Parties: Indonesia; Free Aceh Movement

The Helsinki Agreement (Indonesian: Kesepakatan Helsinki, Finnish: Helsingin sopimus, Swedish: Helsingforsavtalet) is a term commonly used in Indonesia to refer to the memorandum of understanding between the government of Indonesia and the Free Aceh Movement (GAM) signed in Helsinki, Finland on 15 August 2005. This agreement contains a statement of commitment from both parties to efforts to resolve the Aceh conflict in a peaceful, comprehensive, sustainable, and dignified manner for the people of Aceh. The Helsinki Accords detailed the content of the agreement reached and the principles that would guide the transformation process.

== Background ==
Aceh is Indonesia's westernmost province and the site of an armed rebellion that has been ongoing for decades since 1976. Therefore, the Indonesian government has been keen to engage in peace negotiations, especially after the fall of Suharto.

In 2000, a "Humanitarian Pause" resulted in only a temporary halt to the violence. In 2002, a "Cessation of Hostilities Agreement" (COHA) was agreed upon, which ended when the Indonesian government declared martial law in Aceh in May 2003 and announced its intention to crush the Free Aceh Movement (GAM). Initial steps toward renewed negotiations occurred early in the year, accelerated by the impact of the devastating Indian Ocean tsunami of 26 December 2004, which caused numerous casualties in Aceh. After five rounds of intense negotiations between January and July, both sides finally agreed to the Helsinki Agreement.

== Contents ==
The Helsinki Agreement consists of four parts:

- The first part concerns the agreement on the Governance of Aceh.
- The second part concerns Human Rights.
- The third part concerns Amnesty and Reintegration of GAM into society.
- The fourth part concerns Security Arrangements.
- The fifth part concerns the Establishment of the Aceh Monitoring Mission.
- The sixth part concerns Dispute Settlement.

There are 71 articles in the Helsinki Agreement. among them, Aceh is authorized to exercise authority in all public sectors, which will be carried out concurrently with civil administration and the judiciary, except in the areas of foreign relations, external defense, national security, monetary and fiscal matters, judicial power, and religious freedom, where these policies fall under the authority of the government of the Republic of Indonesia in accordance with the constitution in force at the time.

== Process ==
The Helsinki Agreement was reached through five rounds of negotiations, beginning on 27 January 2005, and ending on 15 August 2005.

- The first round took place from 27 to 29 January 2005
- The second round from 21 to 23 February 2005
- The third round from 12 to 14 April 2005
- The fourth round from 26 to 31 May 2005
- The fifth round from 12 to 17 July 2005
- The agreement was signed on 15 August 2005.

The Indonesian delegation at the negotiations consisted of Hamid Awaluddin, Sofyan A. Djalil, Farid Husain, Usman Basyah, and I Gusti Wesaka Pudja. Meanwhile, the GAM negotiating team consisted of Malik Mahmud, Zaini Abdullah, M. Nur Djuli, Nurdin Abdurrahman, and Bachtiar Abdullah.

The negotiation facilitator was Martti Ahtisaari, Former President of Finland, Chairman of the Board of Directors of the Crisis Management Initiative, assisted by Juha Christensen.

The original Helsinki Agreement consists of three copies, signed by Hamid Awaluddin as Minister of Law and Human Rights on behalf of the government of the Republic of Indonesia, Malik Mahmud, as the leader of the negotiating team of the Free Aceh Movement, and Martti Ahtisaari, former President of Finland and Chairman of the Board of Directors of the Crisis Management Initiative, as the facilitator of the negotiation process.

== Accession ==
After 14 years of the Helsinki Agreement, not all of its articles have been implemented. Among them, point 1.4.5 states that all civilian crimes committed by military personnel in Aceh will be tried in civilian courts in Aceh.

== Books on the Helsinki Agreement ==
The main actors in the Helsinki negotiations have written extensively about the process of reaching the Helsinki Accords in books, both their own and those written by others.

- Martti Ahtisaari's role as a negotiation facilitator was written by Katri Merikallio in a book entitled Making Peace: Ahtisaari and Aceh (2006).
- Farid Husain wrote the book To See the Unseen, The Story Behind Peace in Aceh (2007).
- Jusuf Kalla is told in the book Kalla and Aceh Peace by Fachry Ali, Suharso Monoarfa and Bahtiar Effendy (2008).
- Hamid Awaluddin wrote Peace in Aceh: Notes on the RI-GAM Peace in Helsinki (2007).
