= Bambang =

Bambang may refer to

== Places ==
=== Philippines ===
- Bambang, Nueva Vizcaya, a municipality
- Several barangays (listed by municipality and province/region, ordered by the latter):
  - Bambang, Calaca, Batangas
  - Bambang, Pasig, Metro Manila
  - Bambang, Taguig, Metro Manila
  - Bambang, Candaba, Pampanga
- Bambang station in Manila

=== Indonesia ===
- Bambang, a district in the Mamasa Regency, West Sulawesi

== People ==
From Indonesia:

- Bambang Brodjonegoro, Minister of National Development Planning
- Bambang Darmono, military commander
- Bambang Dwi Hartono (born 1961), Mayor of Surabaya, 2002/2005–2010
- Bambang Hendarso Danuri (born 1952), Chief of National Police, 2008–2010
- Bambang Pamungkas (born 1980), footballer
- Bambang Soesatyo aka Bamsoet (born 1962), politician and businessman
- Bambang Trihatmodjo (born 1953), third son of Suharto
- Susilo Bambang Yudhoyono aka SBY (born 1949), President, 2004–2014

== See also ==
- Bamban, a town in Tarlac, Philippines
- Bayambang, a town in Pangasinan, Philippines
