= Teungku Chik di Tiro =

Guerrilla and freedom fighter in Indonesia

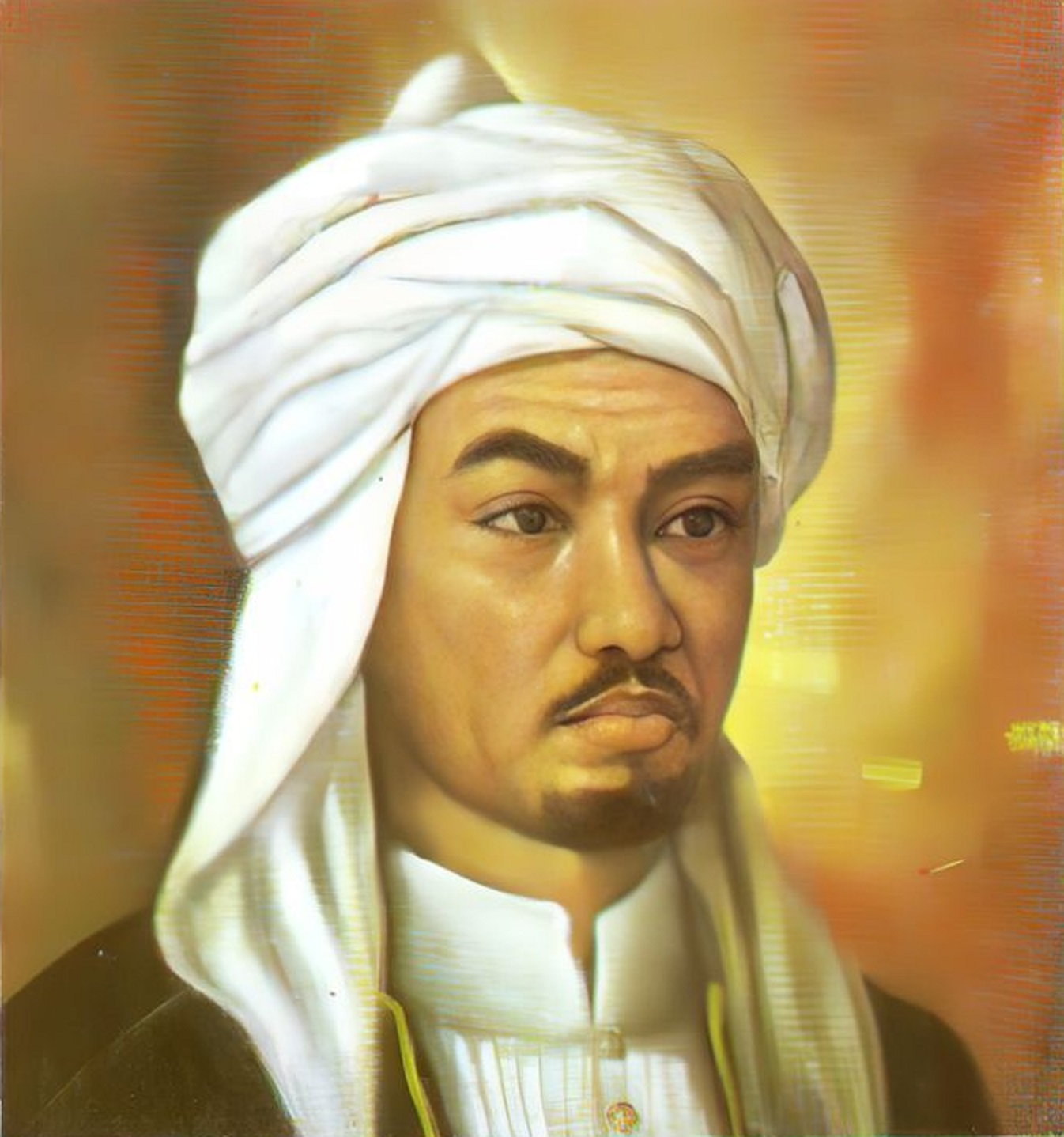
- Drawing of Teungku Chik di Tiro
- Born: Muhammad Saman; 1836; Tiro, Pedir, Aceh Sultanate
- Died: 21 January 1891 (aged 54–55); Lamtuba, Koetaradja, Aceh Sultanate
- Cause of death: Consumption of poisoned food
- Resting place: Meureu, Aceh Besar
- Occupations: Religious teacher, guerrilla fighter
- Children: 5
- Relatives: Hasan di Tiro (Great grandson)

Muhammad Saman (1836 – 21 January 1891), better known as Teungku Chik di Tiro (usually spelt Cik di Tiro in Indonesia), was an Acehnese guerrilla fighter against the Dutch. On 6 November 1973, he was declared a National Hero of Indonesia.

== Biography ==
Di Tiro was born to Tengku Syekh Abdullah and Siti Aisyah in Tiro, Pedir, Aceh Sultanate, in 1836. Until the age of 15, he studied with his father; he then began studying with his uncle, Teungku Chik Dayah Cut di Tiro. After studying under several more teachers, he moved to Aceh Besar and spent two years there. During the day he studied Islam and at night he joined his friends in the struggle against the Dutch colonialists. He was eventually called home to Tiro, where he began teaching with his uncle.

After several years as a teacher, di Tiro went on the hajj to Mecca. There, he met several Islamic leaders and other revolutionaries from Sumatra, Java, and Borneo; through discussions on imperialism and colonialism, di Tiro became more interested in fighting against the Dutch.

One day in 1880, after di Tiro returned to Tiro, a group of guerrilla fighters came through, looking for an ulama (religious leader) to lead the fight. Di Tiro volunteered and joined the guerrillas in their base in Mount Miram. He then traveled throughout Aceh. Every time he stopped in a town, he would deliver lectures at a mosque about holy war and how it was their duty to fight against unbelievers. At the same time, he sent letters to other ulama to call them to war, determined to have the Dutch driven out of Aceh by 1883.

Soon di Tiro and the ulama had gathered 6,000 soldiers to fight against the Dutch, as well as the support of the Sultan of Aceh. The Dutch, although aware of the impending rebellion, remained unaware of di Tiro's identity. Soon his troops cut communications between Dutch fortresses and established their own base in Mureu. Previous struggles in the 1870s had led the Dutch to double their numbers in Aceh.

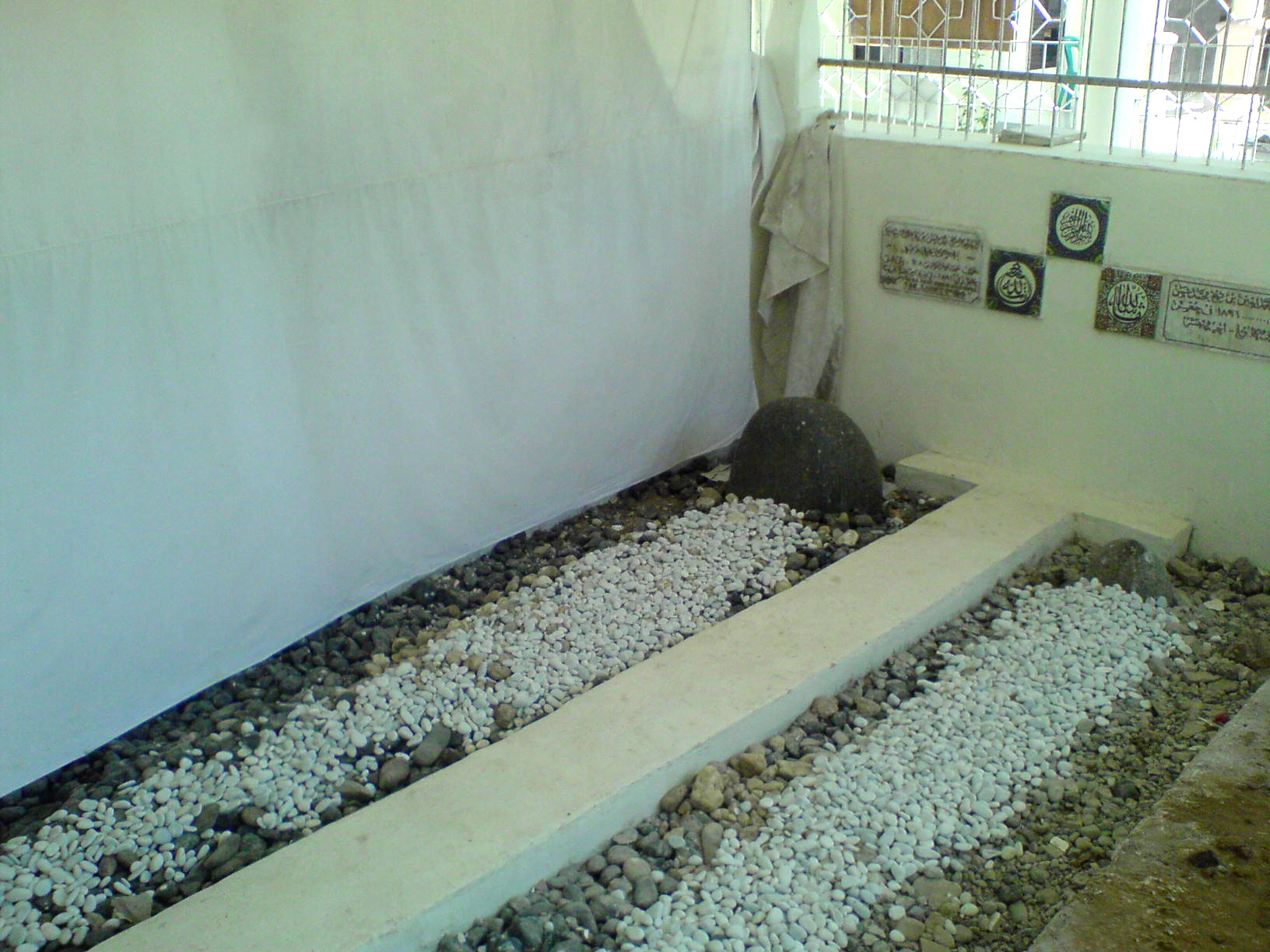
Chik di Tiro's grave in Mureu, Indrapuri, Aceh Besar

In May 1881, di Tiro and his troops captured the Dutch fortress in Indrapuri, sparking the Aceh War. This was followed by the ones in Krueng Jreu and Gle Kameng. In response, the Dutch reinforced their fortresses in Lambaro, Aneuk Galong, and Samahani. Through 1882 and 1883, the two sides continued to fight, with the Acehnese gaining ground and taking over the island of Breuh. In early 1883, di Tiro's forces attacked the Dutch stronghold in Kutaraja (now Banda Aceh); despite failing to take the fort, they succeeded in killing the Dutch controuler. At the peak of the war, the Dutch controlled only 4 square kilometres (1.5 sq mi) of land; before the war, they had controlled nearly all of Aceh.

In April 1884, the sultan was told that di Tiro was now leader of the people. In response, the sultan made a proclamation that he was still sultan; in August di Tiro himself declared that he had no intentions to be sultan.

By 1885, di Tiro felt that the Dutch were ready to capitulate. As such, he sent an ultimatum to Assistant Resident Van Langen, offering peace if the Dutch would convert to Islam. Although some Dutchmen came claiming that they were willing to convert, they were later discovered to be spies. In 1888 di Tiro sent another letter; this one also received no response from the Dutch leadership. He then led more expeditions against Dutch forces, despite still being unable to enter Kutaraja.

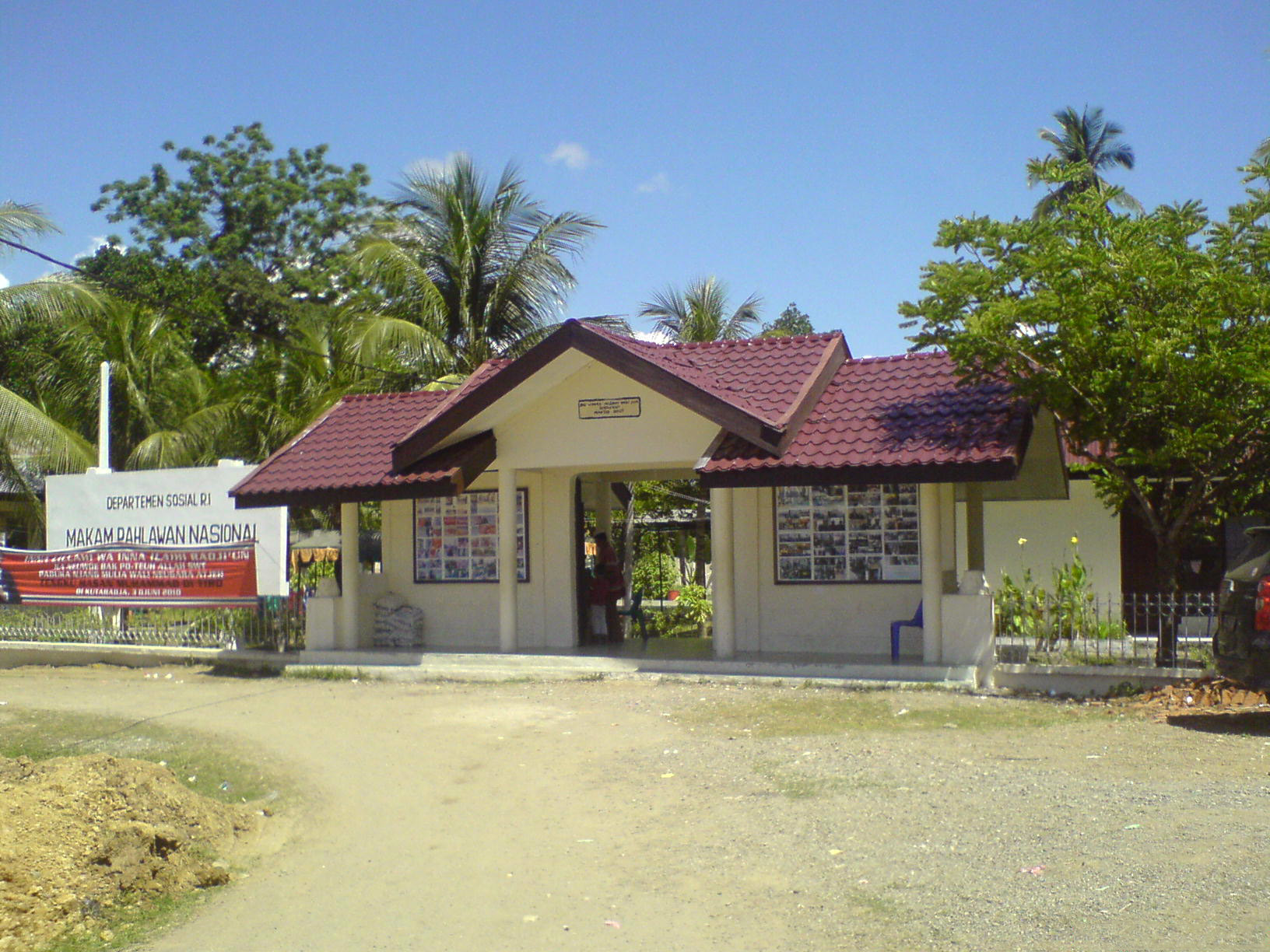
Entrance gate to Teungku Chik di Tiro Muhammad Saman's grave

For several more years di Tiro led his troops against the Dutch; the attempts to spy on him led him to declare that he would not rest until all the Dutch were killed. On 21 January 1891, di Tiro was served poisoned food by the son of the leader of Sagi, whom the Dutch had offered a leadership position if he would kill di Tiro; despite being taken to Aneuk Galong fortress to be treated, di Tiro soon died. He was later buried at the family graveyard in Meureu, Aceh Besar. His struggle was continued by other Acehnese figures, including Teuku Umar, Cut Nyak Dhien, and Cut Nyak Meutia, as well as his family.

== Legacy ==
On 6 November 1973, President Suharto declared di Tiro a National Hero of Indonesia through Presidential Decree number 087/TK of 1973. He has numerous streets named after him, including one of the main streets in the well-known suburb of Menteng in Jakarta.

== Personal life ==
Di Tiro had five sons: Teungku Mat Amin, Teungku Mahidin, Teungku di Tungkob, Teungku di Buket, and Teungku Lambada. Through them he was the great-grandfather of Free Aceh Movement founder Hasan di Tiro.
