= Aceh Monitoring Mission =

Mission of the European Union

- Abbreviation: AMM
- Formation: 15 August 2005
- Dissolved: 15 December 2006

The Aceh Monitoring Mission (AMM) was deployed by the European Union after the "Memorandum of Understanding between the Government of the Republic of Indonesia and the Free Aceh Movement had been signed on 15 August 2005 in Helsinki, Finland. The AMM is one of many missions under the EU's Common Security and Defence Policy.

== Establishment of AMM ==
The Aceh Monitoring Mission, led by Mr Pieter Feith from the EU, was established to monitor the implementation of various aspects of the peace agreement set out in the Helsinki Agreement signed in 15 August 2005. The European Union, together with five contributing countries from ASEAN (Thailand, Malaysia, Brunei, Philippines and Singapore), Norway and Switzerland, provided monitors for the peace process in Aceh (Indonesia).

Following a brief interim presence (IMP) after the signing of the MoU, the AMM was officially launched on 15 September 2005 covering an initial period of 6 months. It was later extended until December 2006 and continued work until 2012. The presence of AMM was based on an official invitation from the GoI and with the full support of the leadership of the GAM.

The AMM undertook the mission to contribute to a peaceful, comprehensive and sustainable solution to the conflict in Aceh. This had been made all the more important by the tsunami disaster of 26 December 2004. In undertaking the mission, the EU and ASEAN fully respected the territorial integrity of Indonesia and saw the future of Aceh as being within the unitary state of the Republic of Indonesia. AMM was impartial by nature and did not represent or favour any of the parties. The head of mission reported to the Council of the European Union through the Political and Security Committee and to Javier Solana, Secretary General/High Representative of the Council of the EU on matters related to the AMM. He reported to the parties, the CMI, and the contributing countries on possible violations of the MoU.

== Objectives ==
The objective of the AMM was to assist the GoI and the GAM in the implementation of the MoU. The AMM did not take on a negotiation role. It was agreed that should this be needed during the implementation process, it would be the responsibility of the two parties and the original facilitator (i.e. the chairman of the Crisis Management Initiative (CMI)). For the final period of its mandate from 15 September 2006 to 15 December 2006, the following tasks were undertaken:

- investigation and ruling on complaints and alleged violations of the Memorandum of Understanding;
- establishing and maintaining liaison and good co-operation with the parties.

As part of the AMM's tasks the decommissioning of GAM armaments and the relocation of non-organic military and police forces was fully completed on 5 January 2006. In accordance with the MoU, the GAM handed over all of its 840 weapons to AMM and on 27 December 2005 it officially disbanded its military wing (TNA). Equally the GoI fulfilled its commitments by relocating its non-organic military and police. The number of police and military (TNI) forces remaining in Aceh were within the maximum strength of 14,700 for the TNI and 9,100 for the police, in accordance with the MoU.

One of the difficulties underpinning the work of the AMM was that there is a history of conflict in Aceh. In 2012 "The Jakarta Post", for example, noted that 'Aceh has experienced 138 years of conflict and only 15 years of peace.'

=== Human rights ===
The AMM has also monitored the human rights situation, the process of legislative change and the reintegration of GAM members. The Law on the Governing of Aceh was enacted by the National Parliament (DPR) on 11 July 2006 and signed by the president Susilo Bambang Yudhoyono on 1 August 2006. Through discussions facilitated by AMM, the parties to the peace process consensually agreed that there were no disputed amnesty cases under the MoU.

As a response to the positive progress of the peace process and the firm commitment by the parties the AMM, reduced its number of monitors in Aceh. From 15 September 2006, the mission functioned in a configuration of 36 monitors. The AMM district offices closed down in September 2006. Thereafter, mobile monitoring from Banda Aceh was available for deployment throughout Aceh as necessary.

The mission comprised personnel with expertise in the whole range of competencies needed to fulfil the tasks of the activity. AMM was a civilian and not a military mission. Its members did not carry weapons. Some monitors had a military background because this was necessary to perform certain technical monitoring tasks. All monitors wore recognisable white shirts with AMM logo. Monitors conducted their monitoring tasks by patrolling and communicating with both parties, and by carrying out inspections and investigations as required.

The mission continued work until mid-2012. The activity was formally completed in May 2012 although the EU announced commitments to further support for development projects in Aceh in other sectors such as environment and climate change activities.

== Costs ==
The costs of the mission were financed from the EU budget (EUR 9.3 million) and by contributions of member states of the European Union and participating countries (EUR 6 million).
