= Sutanto =

Head of Indonesian State Intelligence Agency (born 1950)

Police-General (Ret.) Sutanto
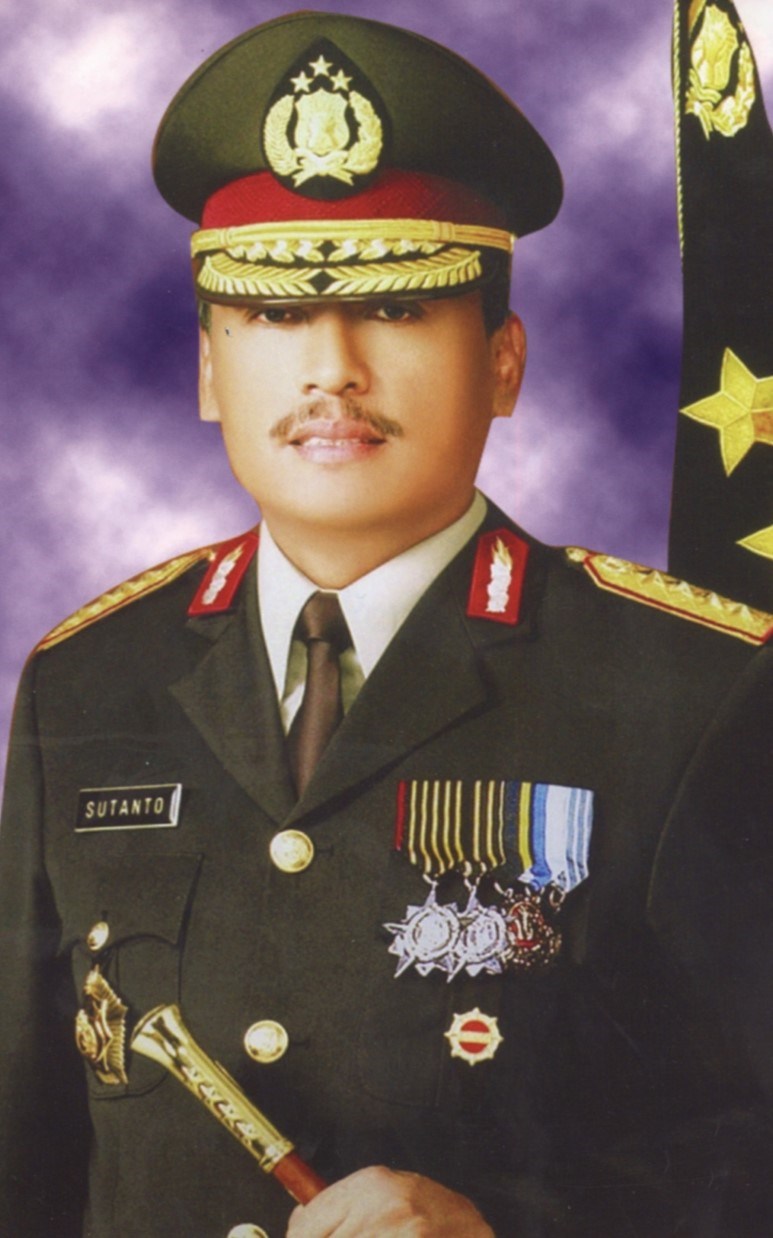

18th Chief of the Indonesian National Police
- In office 8 July 2005 – 30 September 2008
- President: Susilo Bambang Yudhoyono
- Preceded by: Da'i Bachtiar
- Succeeded by: Bambang Hendarso Danuri

Personal details
- Born: 30 September 1950 (age 76) Comal, Pemalang, Central Java, Indonesia
- Party: Democratic Party (Indonesia)
- Education: Akpol 1973

Police-General (Ret.) Drs. Sutanto (born 30 September 1950 in Comal, Pemalang, Central Java) was the Head of Indonesian State Intelligence Agency from 22 October 2009 to 18 October 2011. Previously he was Chief of the Indonesian National Police since 8 July 2005 to 30 September 2008.

He graduated from the Police Academy in 1973. He was previously the Head of the Executive Agency Daily (Kalakhar) National Anti-Narcotics Agency. He became aide to President Suharto in 1995 - 1998, Regional Police Chief (Kapolda) of North Sumatra (2000), and was the East Java police chief (17 October 2000 – October 2002).

== Family ==
- Wife: Henny S
- Children: Tanti Ari Dewi, Wenny Natalia Dewi, Bimo Agung Wibowo dan Widya Ari Dewi
