= Simpang KKA incident =

Shooting of protesters in Indonesia

- Part of the insurgency in Aceh
- Date: 3 May 1999; 27 years ago
- Location: Dewantara, North Aceh, Special Region of Aceh, Indonesia
- Perpetrator: Indonesian National Armed Forces
- Deaths: 52
- Injuries: Over 100 (Human Rights Watch)

The Simpang KKA incident, also known as the Dewantara incident or the Krueng Geukueh incident, was a massacre of protestors during Aceh insurgency that occurred on 3 May 1999 in North Aceh, Special Region of Aceh, Indonesia. 52 people were killed and more than 100 wounded after the Indonesian Armed Forces randomly shot at hundreds of peaceful protesters against an earlier shooting incident (30 April) at Cot Murong, Lhokseumawe.

== Incident ==
Simpang KKA is a junction on the Banda Aceh–Medan Main Road, near the Kertas Kraft Aceh (KKA), a kraft paper factory at Dewantara, near the city of Lhokseumawe. On 3 May 1999, hundreds of civilians protested against the previous Indonesian military shooting at Cot Murong, where two villagers disappeared and twelve were beaten.

Witnesses said the army opened fire without warning. 52 people were killed, with Human Rights Watch stating their age ranged from seven to 60, and were shot with lead bullets.Video footage shows the army shooting indiscriminately as protesters flee.

== In popular culture ==
Alongside three other atrocities, the Simpang KKA incident was featured in the song Harô-Hara (lit. 'Pandemonium') in the album Album Aceh: Nyawöung.
