= Teungku Lah =

Separatist leader (1947–2002)

Perkasa Alam Teungku Abdullah Syafi'i
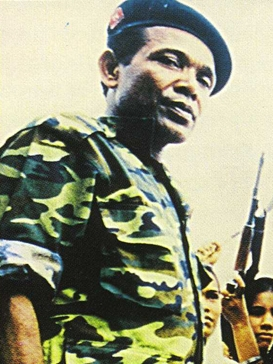
- Abdullah Syafi'i in 1999
- Born: 12 October 1947; Seuneubok Rawa, Peusangan, Bireuen, Aceh, Indonesia
- Died: 22 January 2002 (aged 54); Jim-jim, Bandar Baru, Pidie Jaya, Aceh, Indonesia
- Military career
- Allegiance: Free Aceh Movement
- Service years: 1976–2002
- Rank: General
- Nickname: Teungku Lah
- Unit: National Acehnese Army (TNA)
- Conflicts: Insurgency in Aceh; Battle of Alue Mon †

Abdullah Syafi'i (12 October 1947 – 22 January 2002), commonly known as Teungku Lah, was an Acehnese militant and commander of the armed wing of the Free Aceh Movement (GAM). He was one of the most prominent field leaders during the insurgency in Aceh in the late 20th and early 21st centuries.

== Early life ==
Abdullah Syafii was born on 12 October 1947 in Seuneubok Rawa, a remote village in Bireuen, Aceh. He came from a local Acehnese family and received an Islamic education at Madrasah Aliyah Peusangan, Bireuen, and studied religion at several pesantren in Aceh. Before joining GAM, he was involved in Jeumpa theatre troupe.

== Militant career ==
Abdullah Syafii became involved with the Free Aceh Movement (GAM) shortly after the movement’s founding in the mid-1970s. Unlike some GAM members who had received training abroad, Syafii gained experience directly within Aceh.

He rose through the ranks during the late 1980s and 1990s and eventually became a regional commander within GAM’s armed forces. By the late 1990s, he was widely recognized as a senior military leader within the organization.

== Death ==
On 22 January 2002, Abdullah Syafii, was killed in combat with the Indonesian National Armed Forces (TNI) after being surrounded in the hills of Alue Mon. The battle, which began at 08:00, lasted until approximately 18:00. As a result of the engagement, GAM forces were scattered. Abdullah Syafii was fatally shot when a TNI bullet struck his chest. Alongside him, his wife, Ummi Fatimah binti Abdurrahman, his bodyguard, Muhammad bin Ishak, and his advisor, Muhammad Daud bin Hasyim, were also killed.
