= Bambang Darmono =

Indonesian general

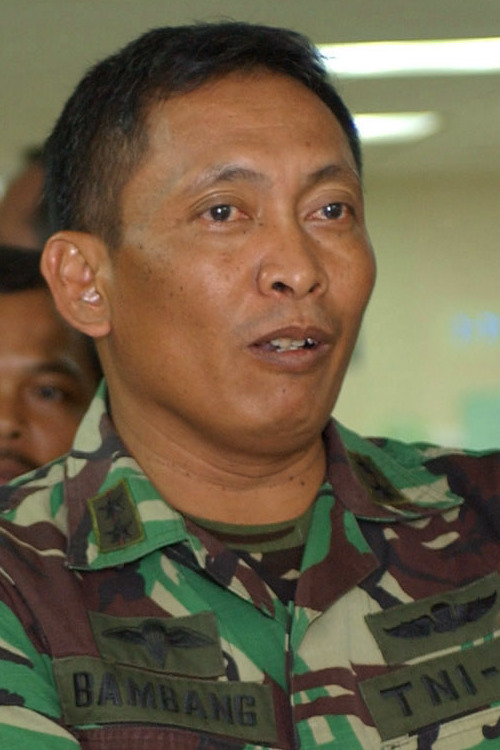
- Bambang in 2005

Chief of Staff of Kodiklat
- In office 29 Oktober 2007 – 17 Oktober 2008
- Preceded by: Cornel Simbolon
- Succeeded by: Syaiful Rizal

Personal details
- Born: May 4, 1952 (age 74) Indonesia
- Education: Military Academy (1974)

Military service
- Allegiance: Indonesia
- Branch/service: Indonesian Army
- Years of service: 1974–2010
- Rank: Lieutenant General
- Battles/wars: Insurgency in Aceh

Major General Bambang Darmono was the commander of the Indonesian military presence in Aceh from 2002 to 2005. Accusations of human rights violations have been leveled at his command during this time.
