= Hasan Tiro =

Founder of the Free Aceh Movement

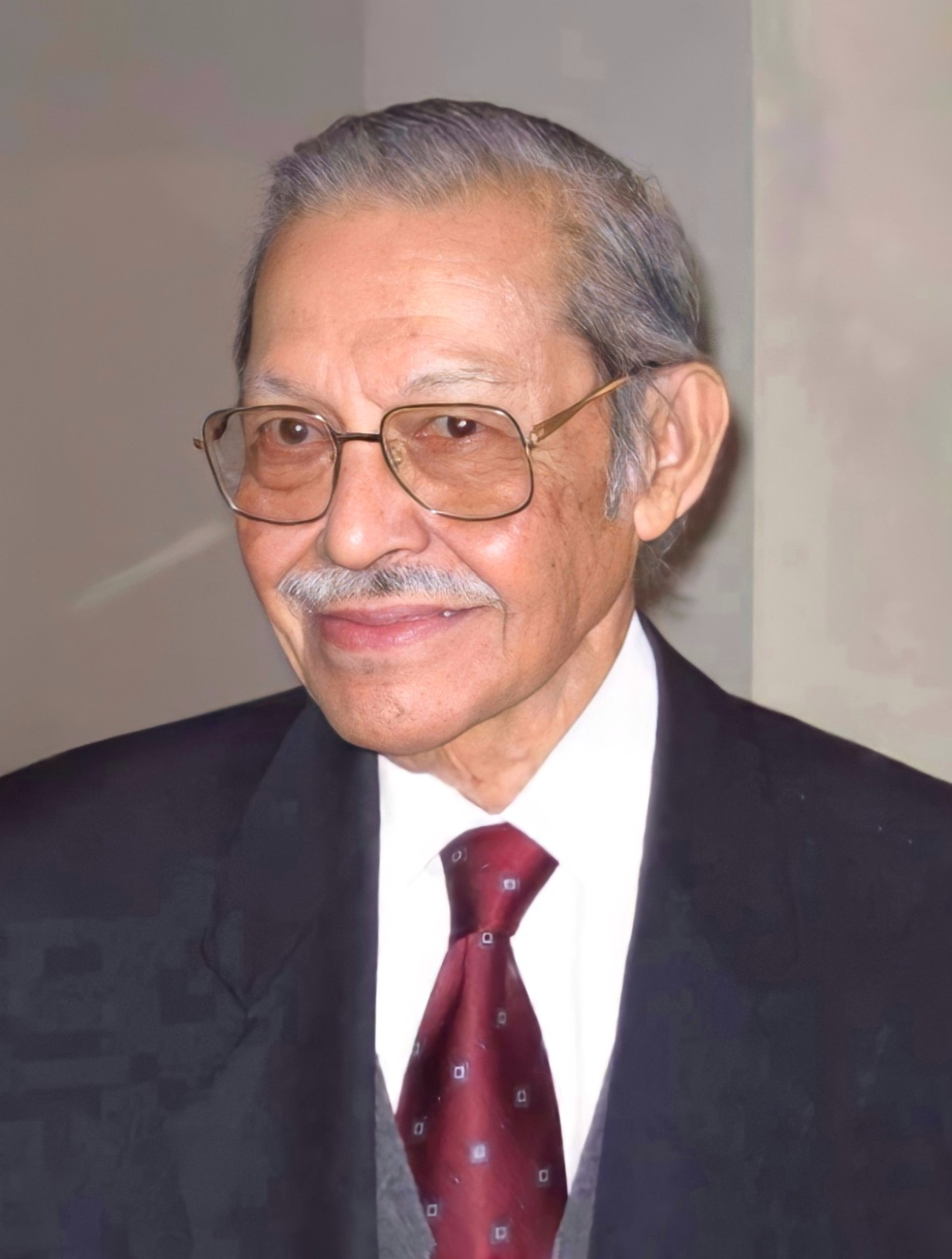

Leader of the Free Aceh Movement
- In office 1976–2010
- Preceded by: Position established
- Succeeded by: Muaz Amin Tiro

Personal details
- Born: Hasan bin Leube Muhammad; 25 September 1925 Pidie, Atjeh and Dependencies, Dutch East Indies
- Died: 3 June 2010 (aged 84) Banda Aceh, Aceh, Indonesia
- Citizenship: Indonesia (2010); Sweden (1979–2010)
- Spouse: Dora
- Children: 1
- Relatives: Teungku Chik di Tiro (great-grandfather)
- Education: University of Plano; Columbia University
- Nickname: Wali

Military service
- Allegiance: Free Aceh Movement
- Years of service: 1976–2005
- Battles/wars: Darul Islam rebellion Insurgency in Aceh

Hasan Muhammad di Tiro (born Hasan bin Leube Muhammad; 25 September 1925 – 3 June 2010), was the founder of the Free Aceh Movement (GAM), an organisation which attempted to separate Aceh from Indonesia from the 1970s. It surrendered its separatist goals and agreed to disarm as agreed to in the Helsinki peace deal of 2005. He was the maternal great-grandson of Teungku Chik di Tiro, an Acehnese guerilla fighter and national hero of Indonesia who was killed fighting the Dutch in 1891. In 2010 he obtained his Indonesian citizenship back shortly before his death.

== Background ==
Coming from a prominent family, from village of Tiro (Pidie Regency), di Tiro studied in the modernist schools of Daud Beure'eh's PUSA organisation from 1938 and through the Japanese occupation and was a leader of the PUSA Scouts by 1945. He was active as a Pesindo (Socialist Youth) leader in the 'social revolution' against Aceh's ruling aristocratic uleebalangs in December 1945. Then a passionate advocate of identifying Aceh's history with Indonesia's nationalist struggle, he studied further in the Indonesian revolutionary capital, Yogyakarta, and authored two books in defence of this view. He then continued his studies in United States, where he did part-time work for Indonesian Mission to the United Nations. While a student in New York City in 1953, he declared himself the "foreign minister" of the rebellious Darul Islam movement, which in Aceh was led by Daud Bereueh. Due to this action, he was immediately stripped of his Indonesian citizenship, causing him to be detained for a few months on Ellis Island. The Darul Islam rebellion in Aceh itself ended in a peace deal in 1962. Under the peace deal Aceh was granted nominal autonomy.

== Creating GAM ==
Di Tiro re-appeared in Aceh in 1974, where he applied for a pipeline contract in the new Mobil Oil gas plant to be built in Lhokseumawe area. He was outbid by Bechtel, in a tender process in which di Tiro thought the central government had too much control. It has been claimed that, as result of this loss and the death of his brother due to what he considered to be deliberate neglect by a doctor of Javanese ethnicity, di Tiro began organising a separatist movement using his old Darul Islam contacts.

He declared his organisation as the Aceh Sumatra National Liberation Front, better known as the Free Aceh Movement ("Gerakan Aceh Merdeka") on 4 December 1976. Amongst its goals was the total independence of Aceh from Indonesia. Di Tiro chose independence as one of GAM's goals instead of autonomy due to his focus on Aceh's pre-colonial history as an independent state. The ASNLF was distinct from the former Darul Islam rebellion which sought to overthrow the secular Pancasila ideology of Indonesia and create a pan-Indonesian Islamic state based on sharia, if with a high degree of autonomy for Aceh within such a state. In his "Declaration of Independence", he questioned Indonesia's right to exist as it was a multi-cultural state based on the Dutch colonial empire and consisted of numerous prior states and multitudes of ethnicities with little else in common. As such, di Tiro believed that the Acehnese people should restore the pre-colonial state of Aceh and should be separate from the "fraudulent" state of Indonesia.

Due to this new focus on Aceh's history and distinct ethnic identity, some of GAM's activities involved attacking transmigrants, particularly those who worked with the Indonesian army, in an effort to restore Acehnese land to Acehnese people. Ethnic Javanese transmigrants were among those most frequently targeted, due to what were often their close links to the Indonesian army. GAM's principal military activities, however, involved guerrilla attacks against Indonesian soldiers and police.

In 1977, after leading a GAM attack in which an American engineer was killed and another American and South Korean engineer injured, Hasan Tiro was hunted by Indonesian military. He was shot in the leg in a military ambush, and fled to Malaysia.

From 1980, di Tiro lived in Stockholm, Sweden and had Swedish citizenship. For most of this period Zaini Abdullah, who became governor of Aceh in June 2012, was one of his closest Acehnese colleagues in Sweden. After the tsunami in December 2004, the GAM and the Indonesian government agreed to a peace treaty which was signed in Helsinki in August 2005. Under the terms of the peace treaty, which were accepted by GAM's political leadership and endorsed by di Tiro, expanded autonomy was to be provided for Aceh. Shortly afterwards, a new Law on the Governing of Aceh was passed by the national parliament in Jakarta to support the implementation of the peace treaty. In October 2008, after 30 years of exile, di Tiro returned to Aceh.

During the course of the conflict, on three occasions the Indonesian government mistakenly declared that Hasan di Tiro had died.

== Return to Aceh ==
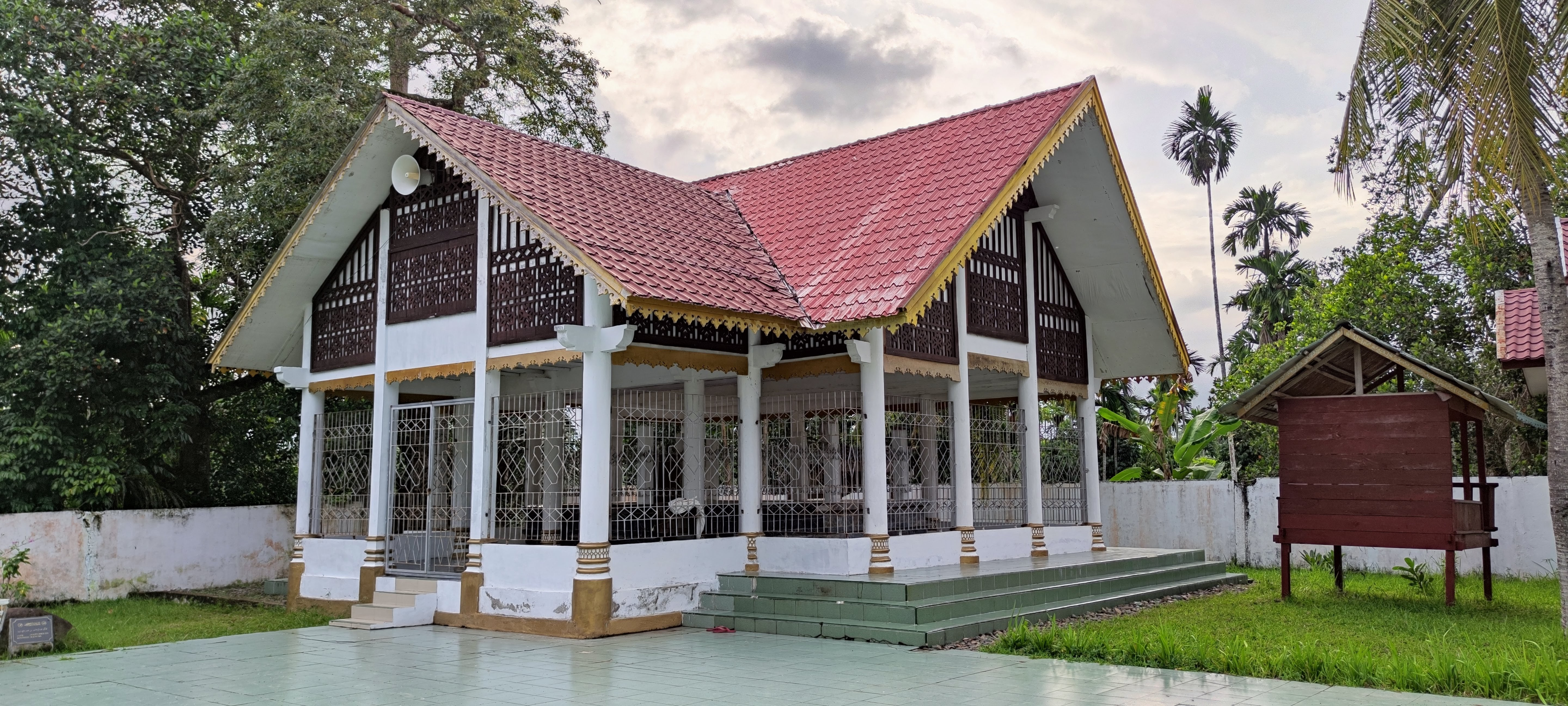
The tomb of Tiro ulama in Mureue, Indrapuri, Aceh Besar

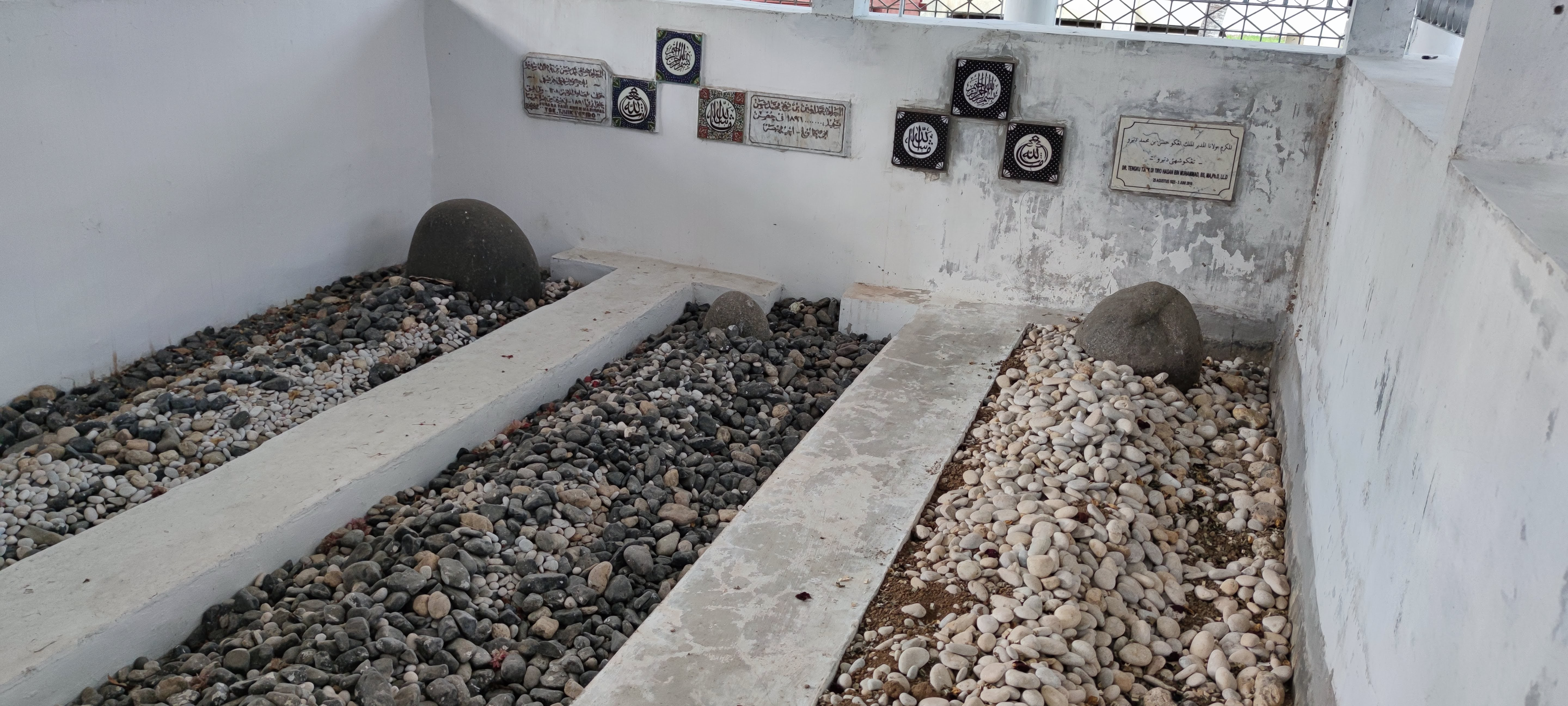
Hasan Tiro was buried next to his great-grandfather, Teungku Chik di Tiro Muhammad Saman National Heroes Cemetery in Meure village.

Hasan di Tiro returned to Aceh after 30 years of self-imposed exile on 11 October 2008. As a consequence of previous strokes, he was too frail to deliver his own speech at his welcome rally and did not play any active role in Aceh's ongoing political process at the time. He stayed for two weeks before returning to Sweden. A year later in October 2009 he again returned to Aceh and stayed there until his death. On 2 June 2010 he regained his Indonesian citizenship after living for years with a Swedish passport. He died the following day of multiple organ dysfunction syndrome in a Banda Aceh hospital.

== See also ==
- Insurgency in Aceh
