= Da'i Bachtiar =

Indonesian police general (born 1950)

Yang Berbahagia Police-General (Ret.) Tan Sri Da'i Bachtiar
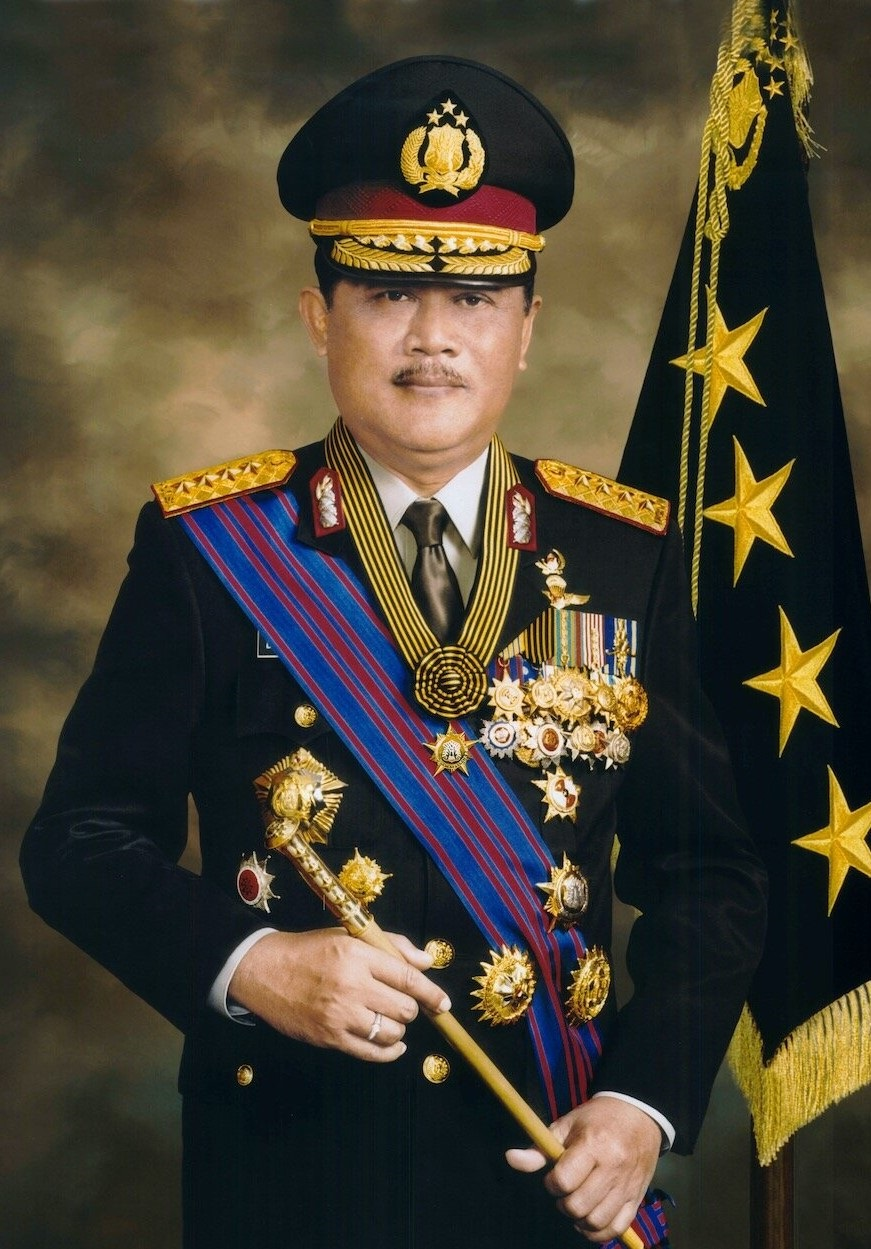
- Official portrait, 2001

17th Chief of the Indonesian National Police
- In office 29 November 2001 – 7 July 2005
- President: Megawati Sukarnoputri; Susilo Bambang Yudhoyono
- Preceded by: Surojo Bimantoro; Chairuddin Ismail (acting)
- Succeeded by: Sutanto

Other roles
- 2008–2012: Indonesian Ambassador to Malaysia

Personal details
- Born: 25 January 1950 (age 76) Indramayu, West Java, Indonesia
- Citizenship: Indonesian
- Party: Independent
- Spouse: Ida Yulianti
- Children: 3
- Occupation: Police officer Diplomat
- Police career
- Allegiance: Indonesia
- Department: Investigation (Reserse)
- Branch: Indonesian National Police
- Service years: 1975–2007
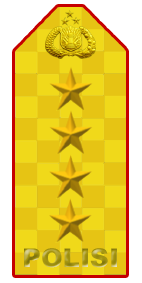
- Rank: Police-General

Da'i Bachtiar (born 25 January 1950) is an Indonesian police officer who was Chief of the Indonesian National Police from November 2001 to July 2005.

On 15 October 2002, he announced that Indonesian investigators at the scene of the Bali bombings had recovered traces of C-4 plastic explosives. It is rumoured that there was rivalry between Bachtiar and intelligence chief Hendropriyono. In November 2002, after Amrozi had been arrested, Bachtiar had a face-to-face meeting with him. Bachtiar laughed, shook hands and posed for photographs with Amrozi.

Currently Bachtiar holds positions as a professor of Security & Counter-Terrorism at Edith Cowan University and Presidium Chairman of Indonesia Crime Prevention Foundation.

== Honours ==
- Australia: Honorary Officer of the Order of Australia (A.O.)
- Malaysia: Honorary Commander of the Order of Loyalty to the Crown of Malaysia - Tan Sri (P.S.M.) (2003)
