= Free Aceh Movement =

1976–2005 separatist group in Indonesia

- Gerakan Aceh Merdeka
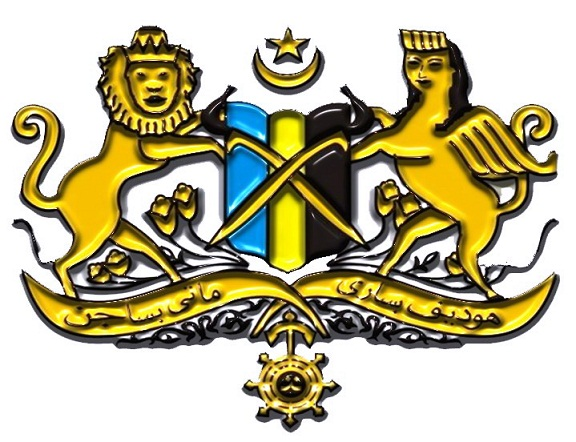
- Flag Coat of arms
- Leader: Hasan Tiro
- Dates active: 4 December 1976 – 15 August 2005 (28 years, 254 days)
- Allegiance: (History of Libya under Muammar Gaddafi) Libya (Until 2002)
- Active regions: City, mountains and forests of Aceh
- Ideology: Acehnese nationalism Islamism
- Wars: Insurgency in Aceh

The Free Aceh Movement (Indonesian: Gerakan Aceh Merdeka, GAM; Acehnese: Acèh Meurdèka, Husaini: Atjèh Meurdèka), known internationally as the Acheh-Sumatra National Liberation Front (ASNLF), was a separatist group seeking independence for the province of Aceh of Sumatra, Indonesia. GAM fought against Indonesian government forces in the Aceh insurgency from 1976 to 2005. Estimates of the death toll total over 15,000 people killed.

The organisation surrendered its separatist intentions and dissolved its armed wing following the 2005 peace agreement with the Indonesian government, and subsequently changed its name into Aceh Transition Committee (Indonesian: Komite Peralihan Aceh, KPA). The Indonesian government called the group the Aceh Security Disturbance Movement.

== Background ==
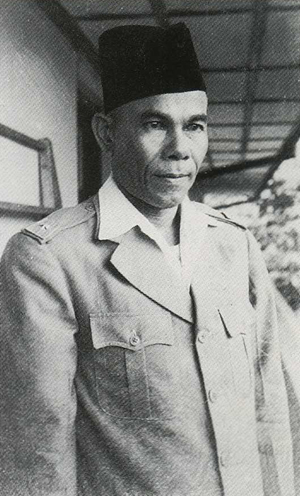
Teuku Daud Beureueh

The conflict in Aceh stems from several major factors including historical mistreatment, disagreements over Islamic law, discontent over the distribution of Aceh's natural resource wealth, and the increase in the numbers of Javanese people in Aceh.

During the era of Dutch colonisation in the 1800s Aceh was a centre of resistance against Dutch colonial rule. They were one of the last Indonesian peoples to succumb to colonial rule and only after a brutal 30-year campaign, the Aceh War of 1873–1903. When the Netherlands transferred sovereignty of their colonial territory, administration of Aceh was handed over to Indonesia and GAM claims that this was done without consultation with Acehnese authorities. Daud Beureueh mounted an armed rebellion that ended with Aceh being granted special status by President Sukarno. However, President Sukarno had not allowed Aceh to implement sharia law during his reign (1945–1967) due to his strong belief of separation of religion and state.

Motivated by discovery of large gas reserves in Lhokseumawe, a former Darul Islam "foreign minister", Hasan di Tiro established the Free Aceh Movement (Gerakan Aceh Merdeka) in December 1976. The small movement carried out its first attack on Mobil engineers in 1977, killing one American engineer.

Due to this incident, GAM came under the attention of central government who sent small units of counter-insurgency troops that successfully crushed the movement. Di Tiro was nearly killed and was forced to flee to Malaysia, while all members of his cabinet were either killed or forced to flee abroad by 1979.

== Armed wings ==
- Acehnese National Army (Acehnese: Teuntara Nanggroe Aceh; TNA)
- Laskar Inong Balee

== Guerrilla war ==
Three incarnations of GAM
| GAM Incarnation | Years Operating | Active members | Casualties |
|---|---|---|---|
| GAM I | 1976–79 | 25–200 | >100 |
| GAM II | 1989–91 | 200–750 | 2,000–10,000 |
| GAM III | 1999–2002 | 15,000–27,000 | 4,364 |

Since its inception GAM has gone through three stages or three rises and falls. The first was at its birth in 1976 to the year 1979 when it was almost wiped out. The second rise and fall was in 1989 to the early 90s when it received funding and training from foreign countries. The third rise was a result of finally gaining widespread support throughout Aceh as a result of donations and extortion and a large group of potential soldiers who had lost relatives in the previous uprising.

=== GAM I ===
At first the guerrilla war of GAM was quite unsuccessful. By 1977, the central government appeared to have entirely neutralised the group. The early GAM efforts were mainly directed at the local ExxonMobil gas plant. Di Tiro had connections with the petroleum industry and even bid, via a tender process, on a contract to build a gas pipeline which was beaten by the gas giant Bechtel. The reason for this failure was a lack of popular support from both within Aceh and from international sources. President Suharto was favoured by countries such as The United States of America due to his anti communist policies during the Cold War period and likely due to the need for oil, as a result of the 1970s oil shocks.

=== GAM II ===
The group renewed its activities in 1989, apparently with financial support from Libya and Iran, fielding around 1,000 soldiers. This training from overseas meant that GAM soldiers were much more organised and better trained than the previous insurgency. To counter this new threat Aceh was declared an "area of special military operations" (Daerah Operasi Militer) or DOM in 1989. Special counter- insurgency troops were sent in and Aceh was locked down. Villages that were suspected of harbouring GAM operatives were burnt down and family members of suspected militants were kidnapped and tortured. Amnesty International called the military response "shock therapy" and it is believed 7,000 human rights abuses took place during DOM. GAM forces have also been suspected of Human Rights abuses. Extra judicial executions of suspected military informants and targeting of civilian infrastructure such as schools have both been attributed to GAM operations.

In 1996, the Indonesian government announced the end of GAM as the counter-insurgency operations had effectively destroyed GAM as a guerrilla force. Surviving GAM members were forced to hide in Malaysia.

Consequent of the war and continuation of the conflict, it led to the growth of Medan as the major centre for northern Sumatra.

=== GAM III ===
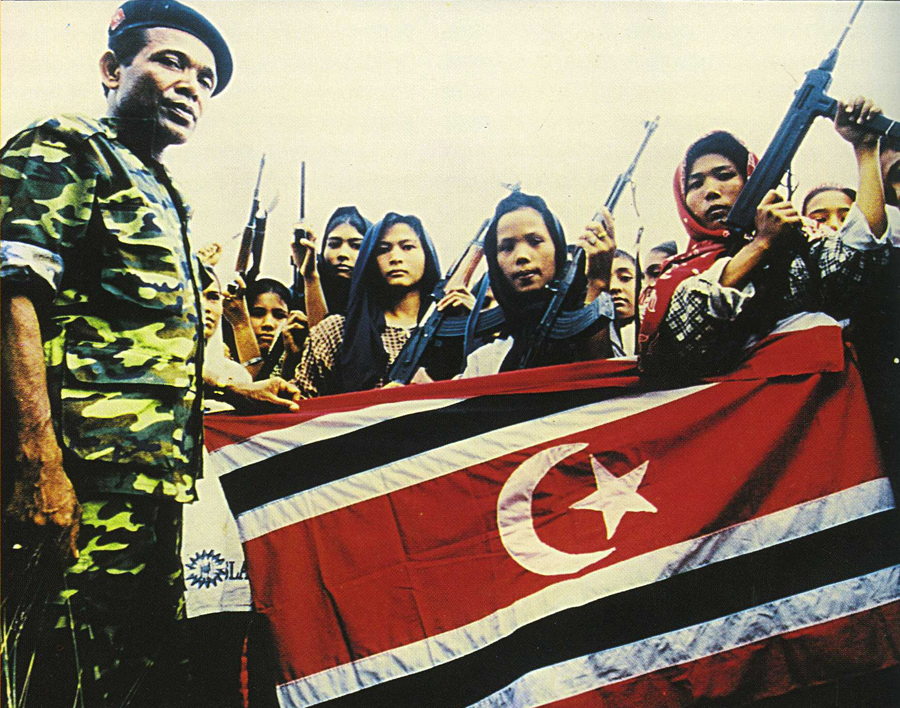
Female soldiers of the Free Aceh Movement with GAM commander Abdullah Syafi'i, 1999.

The fall of Suharto in 1998 and the decision of his successor President Jusuf Habibie to withdraw troops from Aceh as part of democratic reform gave space for GAM to re-establish itself, recruiting youths by exploiting brutality stories of Indonesian military. Increasing violence beginning in 1999 by GAM rebels against government officials and Javanese residents, buoyed by massive weapons smuggling from Thailand by the GAM, led to an increase in military presence. Troop numbers are believed to have risen during the rule of Megawati Sukarnoputri. In 2001–02 the combination of military and police forces in Aceh had grown to about 30,000. In one year this number jumped to 50,000 operating in what the International Crisis group called, "a virtual legal vacuum". The security crackdowns during this time resulted in several thousand civilian deaths. The government launched a large 2003–04 Indonesian offensive in Aceh against the GAM in 2003 with some success.

== Peace negotiations ==
The leaders of GAM, Hasan di Tiro, and his chief deputy, Zaini Abdullah, and Malik Mahmud lived in exile in Stockholm, Sweden for most of the 1980s and 1990s. The group's main Indonesian spokesman was Abdullah Syafei'i Dimatang. In the late 1990s, GAM began peace talks with Jakarta, brokered by the Swedish government.

In 1999, it was reported that the group had split into two factions, GAM (representing the original group) and the Free Aceh Movement Government Council (MP-GAM). This was denied by GAM spokespersons but was widely reported in the Indonesian media.

In December 2002, GAM and GoI signed a breakthrough Cessation of Hostilities Agreement (COHA) which only held for a few months before violations started occurring. The mediator in these negotiations, the Centre for Humanitarian Dialogue, did not have adequate monitoring and enforcing mechanisms to enact sanctions for violations.

In 2002–2004, the GAM was severely hit by a series of government offensives in which the organisation lost approximately 50% of its members including its commander, Abdullah Syafei'i Dimatang, who was killed in a military ambush in January 2002.

On 28 December 2004, in the aftermath of the devastation caused by a massive tsunami, GAM declared a ceasefire of hostilities to allow for aid to reach within the disputed area. In turn, the Indonesian government temporarily removed restrictions of northern Sumatra to allow for rescue efforts in that area.

Other Aceh separatist groups exist and there was some tension between them and GAM over tactics and GAM's monopoly of negotiations with the government.

On 27 February 2005, the Free Aceh Movement and the delegation of the Indonesian government started another round of peace talks in Vantaa, Finland, moderated by former Finnish president Martti Ahtisaari. On 16 July 2005, the Indonesian Minister of Communication and GAM announced a peace deal to end the thirty-year insurgency.

The peace agreement was officially signed on 15 August 2005 in the Finnish Government Banquet Hall in Helsinki by chief Indonesian negotiator Hamid Awaluddin and GAM leader Malik Mahmud. President Ahtisaari was the witness of the peace treaty.

Under the terms of the agreement, both sides agreed to cease all hostilities immediately. GAM also agreed to disarm, while the Government pledged to withdraw all non-local military and police by the end of 2005. An Aceh Monitoring Mission was set up by the EU and ASEAN to oversee the process of disarmament and the reintegration into society of GAM members. A presidential decree granted amnesty to about five hundred former GAM members who were in exile in other countries, and unconditionally released about 1,400 members who had been jailed by the Government.

The Government agreed to facilitate the establishment of Aceh-based political parties; this had been one of the most contentious issues in previous negotiations. A "truth and reconciliation commission" will be organised. On the question of the uneven distribution of income, it was settled that seventy percent of the income from local natural resources will stay within Aceh.

On 27 December 2005, the leaders of the Free Aceh Movement announced that they had disbanded their military wing. The action, which took effect immediately, follows from earlier peace talks and the destruction of 840 weapons by international observers, Free Aceh movement commander Sofyan Daud told reporters, "The Aceh national army is now part of civil society, and will work to make the peace deal a success." As a sign of how the peace process was progressing the founder of Aceh's separatist rebel movement, Hasan di Tiro, returned to Indonesia on 11 October 2008 after nearly 30 years in exile.

== 2006 elections ==
During the election of 11 December 2006, the Free Aceh Movement temporarily split into two factions each supporting its own candidate for governorship. One side supported Zaini Abdullah's brother, and the other side supported Irwandi Yusuf, a former GAM negotiator. Irwandi Yusuf got more support from the grass root level and won the election. The losing faction proceeded to bide its time, aiming to make a comeback in the next gubernatorial election in Aceh due at the end of Irwandi's five-year term in 2011. In the event, the gubernatorial election due to be held at the end of 2011 was delayed by procedural squabbling as different factions scrambled for advantage. The elections took place in April 2012.

== 2012 elections ==
The 2012 election, held on 9 April, was largely a continuation of post-agreement rivalries between former GAM leaders, with Zaini Abdullah having returned from exile and entered into the contest for the governorship against Irwandi. Zaini Abdullah, with the strong support of the Aceh Party, won the election with a substantial majority.

== See also ==
- Free Papua Movement
- Fretilin
