= List of districts of Aceh =

The province of Aceh in Indonesia is divided into regencies and cities, each of which in turn is divided administratively into districts (kecamatan). As of 2022, there are 289 districts in Aceh.

The kecamatans of Aceh, with the regency or city into which each falls, are as follows:

Kecamatan	Regency/City
Alafan	Simeulue Regency
Arongan Lambalek	Aceh Barat Regency
Atu Lintang	Aceh Tengah Regency
Babah Rot	Aceh Barat Daya Regency
Babul Makmur	Aceh Tenggara Regency
Babul Rahmat	Aceh Tenggara Regency
Babussalam	Aceh Tenggara Regency
Badar	Aceh Tenggara Regency
Baiturrahman	Banda Aceh
Baitussalam	Aceh Besar Regency
Bakongan Timur	Aceh Selatan Regency
Bakongan	Aceh Selatan Regency
Baktiya	Aceh Utara Regency
Baktiya Barat	Aceh Utara Regency
Bambel	Aceh Tenggara Regency
Banda Alam	Aceh Timur Regency
Banda Baro	Aceh Utara Regency
Banda Mulia	Aceh Tamiang Regency
Banda Raya	Banda Aceh
Banda Sakti	Lhokseumawe (city)
Bandar Baru	Pidie Jaya Regency
Bandar Dua	Pidie Jaya Regency
Bandar Pusaka	Aceh Tamiang Regency
Bandar	Bener Meriah Regency
Batee	Pidie Regency
Bebesen	Aceh Tengah Regency
Bebesen	Bener Meriah Regency
Bendahara	Aceh Tamiang Regency
Beutong	Nagan Raya Regency
Bies	Aceh Tengah Regency
Bintang	Aceh Tengah Regency
Bintang	Bener Meriah Regency
Birem Bayeun	Aceh Timur Regency
Blang Bintang	Aceh Besar Regency
Blang Jerango	Gayo Lues Regency
Blang Kejeren	Gayo Lues Regency
Blang Mangat	Lhokseumawe (city)
Blang Pegayon	Gayo Lues Regency
Blangpidie	Aceh Barat Daya Regency
Bubon	Aceh Barat Regency
Bukit Tusam	Aceh Tenggara Regency
Bukit	Bener Meriah Regency
Celala	Aceh Tengah Regency
Celala	Bener Meriah Regency
Cot Girek	Aceh Utara Regency
Danau Paris	Aceh Singkil Regency
Darul Aman	Aceh Timur Regency
Darul Hasanah	Aceh Tenggara Regency
Darul Iksan	Aceh Timur Regency
Darul Imarah	Aceh Besar Regency
Darul Kamal	Aceh Besar Regency
Darul Makmur	Nagan Raya Regency
Darussalam	Aceh Besar Regency
Debun Gelang	Gayo Lues Regency
Delima	Pidie Regency
Dewantara	Aceh Utara Regency
Gandapura	Bireuen Regency
Geumpang	Pidie Regency
Geureudong Pase	Aceh Utara Regency
Glumpang Baro	Pidie Regency
Glumpang Tiga	Pidie Regency
Grong Grong	Pidie Regency
Gunung Meriah	Aceh Singkil Regency
Idi Rayeuk	Aceh Timur Regency
Idi Tunong	Aceh Timur Regency
Indra Makmur	Aceh Timur Regency
Indrajaya	Pidie Regency
Indrapuri	Aceh Besar Regency
Ingin Jaya	Aceh Besar Regency
Jagong Jeget	Aceh Tengah Regency
Jangka Buya	Pidie Jaya Regency
Jangka	Bireuen Regency
Jaya Baru	Banda Aceh
Jaya	Aceh Jaya Regency
Jeumpa	Aceh Barat Daya Regency
Jeumpa	Bireuen Regency
Jeunib	Bireuen Regency
Johan Pahlawan	Aceh Barat Regency
Juli	Bireuen Regency
Julok	Aceh Timur Regency
Karang Baru	Aceh Tamiang Regency
Kaway XVI	Aceh Barat Regency
Kebayakan	Aceh Tengah Regency
Kebayakan	Bener Meriah Regency
Kejuruan Muda	Aceh Tamiang Regency
Kembang Tanjong	Pidie Regency
Ketol	Aceh Tengah Regency
Ketol	Bener Meriah Regency
Kluet Selatan	Aceh Selatan Regency
Kluet Tengah	Aceh Selatan Regency
Kluet Timur	Aceh Selatan Regency
Kluet Utara	Aceh Selatan Regency
Kota Baharu	Aceh Singkil Regency
Kota Jantho	Aceh Besar Regency
Kota Juang	Bireuen Regency
Kota Kuala Simpang	Aceh Tamiang Regency
Kota Sigli	Pidie Regency
Krueng Barona Jaya	Aceh Besar Regency
Krueng Sabee	Aceh Jaya Regency
Kuala Batee	Aceh Barat Daya Regency
Kuala	Bireuen Regency
Kuala	Nagan Raya Regency
Kuta Alam	Banda Aceh
Kuta Baro	Aceh Besar Regency
Kuta Blang	Bireuen Regency
Kuta Cot Glie	Aceh Besar Regency
Kuta Makmur	Aceh Utara Regency
Kuta Malaka	Aceh Besar Regency
Kuta Panjang	Gayo Lues Regency
Kuta Raja	Banda Aceh
Kute Panang	Aceh Tengah Regency
Kute Panang	Bener Meriah Regency
Labuhan Haji Barat	Aceh Selatan Regency
Labuhan Haji Timur	Aceh Selatan Regency
Labuhan Haji	Aceh Selatan Regency
Langkahan	Aceh Utara Regency
Langsa Barat	Langsa (city)
Langsa Kota	Langsa (city)
Langsa Lama	Langsa (city)
Langsa Teungoh	Langsa (city)
Langsa Timur	Langsa (city)
Lapang	Aceh Utara Regency
Laut Tawar	Aceh Tengah Regency
Laut Tawar	Bener Meriah Regency
Lawe Alas	Aceh Tenggara Regency
Lawe Bulan	Aceh Tenggara Regency
Lawe Sigala-Gala	Aceh Tenggara Regency
Lembah Sabil	Aceh Barat Daya Regency
Lembah Seulawah	Aceh Besar Regency
Leupung	Aceh Besar Regency
Lho'nga	Aceh Besar Regency
Lhoksukon	Aceh Utara Regency
Lhoong	Aceh Besar Regency
Linge Isaq	Aceh Tengah Regency
Linge Isaq	Bener Meriah Regency
Linge	Aceh Tengah Regency
Longkip	Subulussalam Regency
Lueng Bata	Banda Aceh
Madat	Aceh Timur Regency
Makmur	Bireuen Regency
Mane	Pidie Regency
Manggeng	Aceh Barat Daya Regency
Manyak Payed	Aceh Tamiang Regency
Matang Kuli	Aceh Utara Regency
Mesjid Raya	Aceh Besar Regency
Meukek	Aceh Selatan Regency
Meurah Dua	Pidie Jaya Regency
Meurah Mulia	Aceh Utara Regency
Meuraksa	Banda Aceh
Meureubo	Aceh Barat Regency
Meureudu	Pidie Jaya Regency
Mila	Pidie Regency
Montasik	Aceh Besar Regency
Muara Batu	Aceh Utara Regency
Muara Dua	Lhokseumawe (city)
Muara Satu	Lhokseumawe (city)
Muara Tiga	Pidie Regency
Mutiara Timur	Pidie Regency
Mutiara	Pidie Regency
Nibong	Aceh Utara Regency
Nisam Antara	Aceh Utara Regency
Nisam	Aceh Utara Regency
Nurussalam	Aceh Timur Regency
Padang Tiji	Pidie Regency
Pandrah	Bireuen Regency
Panga	Aceh Jaya Regency
Pantan Cuaca	Gayo Lues Regency
Pante Beudari	Aceh Timur Regency
Pante Ceureumen	Aceh Barat Regency
Panteraja	Pidie Jaya Regency
Panton Reu	Aceh Barat Regency
Pasie Raja	Aceh Selatan Regency
Paya Bakong	Aceh Utara Regency
Pegasing	Aceh Tengah Regency
Pegasing	Bener Meriah Regency
Penanggalan	Subulussalam Regency
Permata	Bener Meriah Regency
Peudada	Bireuen Regency
Peudawa	Aceh Timur Regency
Peukan Bada	Aceh Besar Regency
Peukan Baro	Pidie Regency
Peulimbang	Bireuen Regency
Peureulak Barat	Aceh Timur Regency
Peureulak Timur	Aceh Timur Regency
Peureulak	Aceh Timur Regency
Peusangan Selatan	Bireuen Regency
Peusangan Siblah Krueng	Bireuen Regency
Peusangan	Bireuen Regency
Pidie	Pidie Regency
Pinding	Gayo Lues Regency
Pintu Rime Gayo	Bener Meriah Regency
Pintu Rime	Bener Meriah Regency
Pirak Timu	Aceh Utara Regency
Pulau Banyak	Aceh Singkil Regency
Pulo Aceh	Aceh Besar Regency
Putri Betung	Gayo Lues Regency
Rantau Selamat	Aceh Timur Regency
Rantau	Aceh Tamiang Regency
Ranto Peureulak	Aceh Timur Regency
Rikit Gaib	Gayo Lues Regency
Rundeng	Subulussalam Regency
Rusip Antara	Aceh Tengah Regency
Sakti	Pidie Regency
Salang	Simeulue Regency
Sama Dua	Aceh Selatan Regency
Samalanga	Bireuen Regency
Samatiga	Aceh Barat Regency
Sampoiniet	Aceh Jaya Regency
Samudera	Aceh Utara Regency
Sawang	Aceh Selatan Regency
Sawang	Aceh Utara Regency
Sekrak	Aceh Tamiang Regency
Serba Jadi	Aceh Timur Regency
Seruway	Aceh Tamiang Regency
Setia Bakti	Aceh Jaya Regency
Setia	Aceh Barat Daya Regency
Seulimeum	Aceh Besar Regency
Seunagan Timur	Nagan Raya Regency
Seunagan	Nagan Raya Regency
Seunuddon	Aceh Utara Regency
Silih Nara	Aceh Tengah Regency
Silih Nara	Bener Meriah Regency
Simeulue Barat	Simeulue Regency
Simeulue Tengah	Simeulue Regency
Simeulue Timur	Simeulue Regency
Simpang Jernih	Aceh Timur Regency
Simpang Kanan	Aceh Singkil Regency
Simpang Keuramat	Aceh Utara Regency
Simpang Kiri	Subulussalam Regency
Simpang Mamplam	Bireuen Regency
Simpang Tiga	Aceh Besar Regency
Simpang Tiga	Pidie Regency
Simpang Ulim	Aceh Timur Regency
Singkil Utara	Aceh Singkil Regency
Singkil	Aceh Singkil Regency
Singkohor	Aceh Singkil Regency
Suka Makmur	Aceh Besar Regency
Sukajaya	Sabang Regency
Sukakarya	Sabang Regency
Sultan Daulat	Subulussalam Regency
Sungai Mas	Aceh Barat Regency
Sungai Raya	Aceh Timur Regency
Suro Baru	Aceh Singkil Regency
Suro Makmur	Aceh Singkil Regency
Susoh	Aceh Barat Daya Regency
Syamtalira Aron	Aceh Utara Regency
Syamtalira Bayu	Aceh Utara Regency
Syiah Kuala	Banda Aceh
Syiah Utama	Bener Meriah Regency
Tamiang Hulu	Aceh Tamiang Regency
Tanah Jambo Aye	Aceh Utara Regency
Tanah Luas	Aceh Utara Regency
Tanah Pasir	Aceh Utara Regency
Tangan-Tangan	Aceh Barat Daya Regency
Tangse	Pidie Regency
Tapak Tuan	Aceh Selatan Regency
Teluk Dalam	Simeulue Regency
Tenggulun	Aceh Tamiang Regency
Terangon	Gayo Lues Regency
Teunom	Aceh Jaya Regency
Teupah Barat	Simeulue Regency
Teupah Selatan	Simeulue Regency
Timang Gajah	Bener Meriah Regency
Tiro	Pidie Regency
Titeua	Pidie Regency
Trienggadeng	Pidie Jaya Regency
Tripe Jaya	Gayo Lues Regency
Trumon Timur	Aceh Selatan Regency
Trumon	Aceh Selatan Regency
Ulee Kareng	Banda Aceh
Ulim	Pidie Jaya Regency
Wih Pesam	Bener Meriah Regency
Woyla Barat	Aceh Barat Regency
Woyla Timur	Aceh Barat Regency
Woyla	Aceh Barat Regency
