= Cut Meutia (train) =

Indonesia passenger train service in Aceh

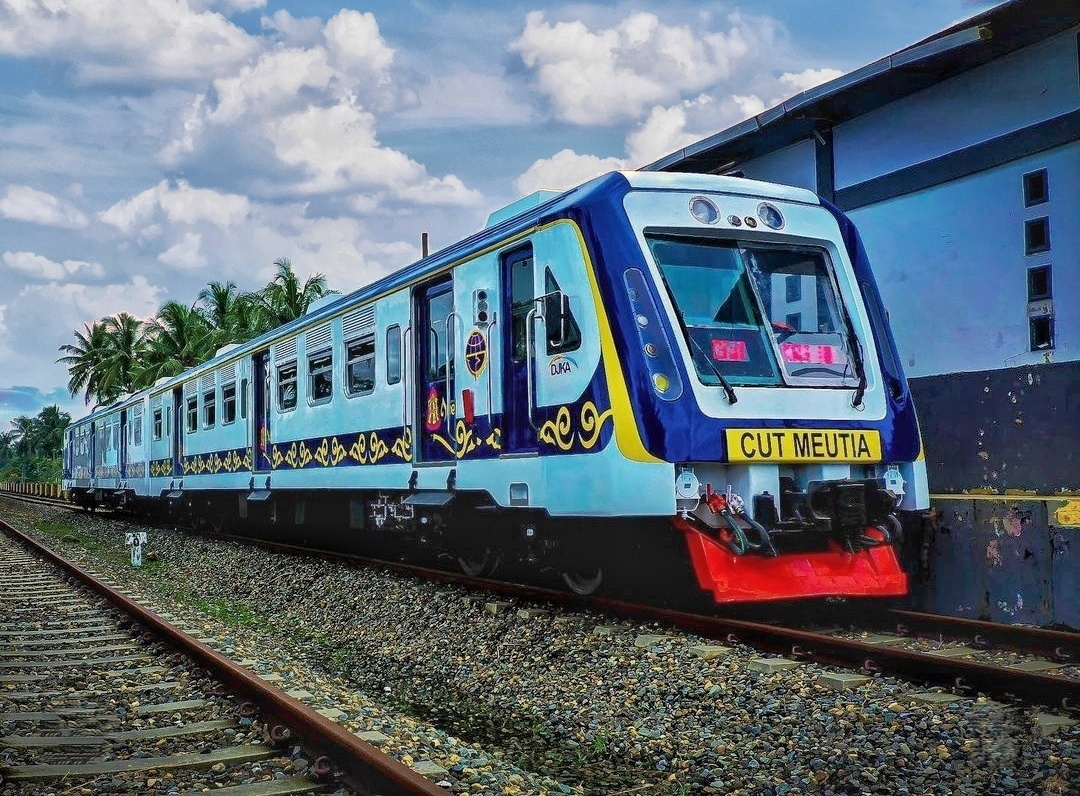
- The Cut Meutia in 2022

Overview
- Service type: Regional rail
- Status: Not Active
- Locale: Bireuën Regency, North Aceh Regency, Lhokseumawe
- First service: 3 November 2016
- Last service: 25 November 2025 (before severe flooding 2025)
- Current operator: Kereta Api Indonesia
- Ridership: 88,508 (2023)

Route
- Termini: Kutablang; Muara Satu
- Stops: 6
- Distance travelled: 29.45 kilometres (18.30 mi)
- Average journey time: 1 hour 21 minutes

Technical
- Track gauge: 4 ft 8 1/2 in (1,435 mm)

The Cut Meutia is a passenger train service currently operating in Aceh, Indonesia. It was opened in 2016 and currently serves six railway stations in North Aceh, Bireuën and Lhokseumawe. It is the only operational train service in Aceh.

== History ==
Railways had been operational in Aceh since the Dutch East Indies era, linking Banda Aceh to Langkat in North Sumatra. The line ceased operations in 1982, however, leaving Aceh without operational train services and existing stations and railways deteriorating. In 1996, an attempt to develop tracks between Langkat and Aceh's provincial border ceased due to funding difficulties after laying 2 kilometers of track. Another section measuring 5 kilometers was developed in 2000, but again development ceased due to a lack of funds.

In 2002, an agreement was struck between governors in Sumatra to redevelop a Trans-Sumatran railway network, which would once more link Aceh to other cities on the island. Following the 2004 earthquake and tsunami, reconstruction aid from France was delivered through SNCF; this included the development of an 11.35 kilometres (7.05 mi) stretch of railway track which followed the 1,435 mm standard gauge instead of the 1,067 mm gauge used elsewhere in Indonesia. Trial runs began on 1 December 2013, with tracks from Krueng Mane near Bireuën to Krueng Geukueh near Lhokseumawe via Bungkaih. Due to lack of passenger demand, the trial was halted by July 2014.

On 3 November 2016, the service was reopened and given the name Cut Meutia after the national hero Cut Nyak Meutia. Kereta Api Indonesia operates the service. As of 2023, it is classified as a "pioneer" service, one of five operational in Indonesia at the time. It is currently the only operational stretch of railway within the province.

Starting in April 2023, the service was extended to Bireuën Regency, servicing the Geurugok and Kutablang stations. The total new length of the service became 21.4 kilometres (13.3 mi).

=== Future extensions ===
A 8 kilometres (5.0 mi) extension to Paloh is in its planning stage. In context of the development of the full Trans-Sumatra system, the 1,435 mm track is planned to meet the national 1,067 mm track at Kutablang, and the planned development of the 1,435 mm railway will be limited to the Kutablang - Lhokseumawe route separate from the main line.

=== Incident severe flooding 2025 ===
In the 26 November 2025, there was severe flooding occurred in Aceh, North Sumatera, and West Sumatera. Severe flooding damaged railway network infrastructure like rail bed and rail bridge in Aceh. Severe flooding has caused The Cut Meutia Train to cease operations. Until today, no repair work has been carried out on this railway line.

== Rolling stock and service ==
The train has two cars and a capacity of 192 passengers, and the whole trip lasts for 1 hour and 3 minutes. The diesel rolling stock was manufactured by PT INKA.

As of 2023, the fare for the train is set at Rp 2,000, with multiple daily services in the morning and afternoon. As of June 2023, the earliest train departs from Krueng Geukueh at 07:20, and the last train departs from Kutablang at 17:35, making four round-trips daily. Due to its low fare and short travel distance, it is commonly used by locals as a recreational vehicle, especially by schoolchildren. The service is currently subsidized by the Indonesian government, receiving Rp 18.8 billion (~USD 1.2 million) in 2021. The service reported 32,936 riders throughout 2022, and 88,508 throughout 2023.

== See also ==
- Pariaman Express
