= Krueng Geukueh railway station =

Railway station in Indonesia

Krueng Geukueh Station Stasiun Krueng Geukueh
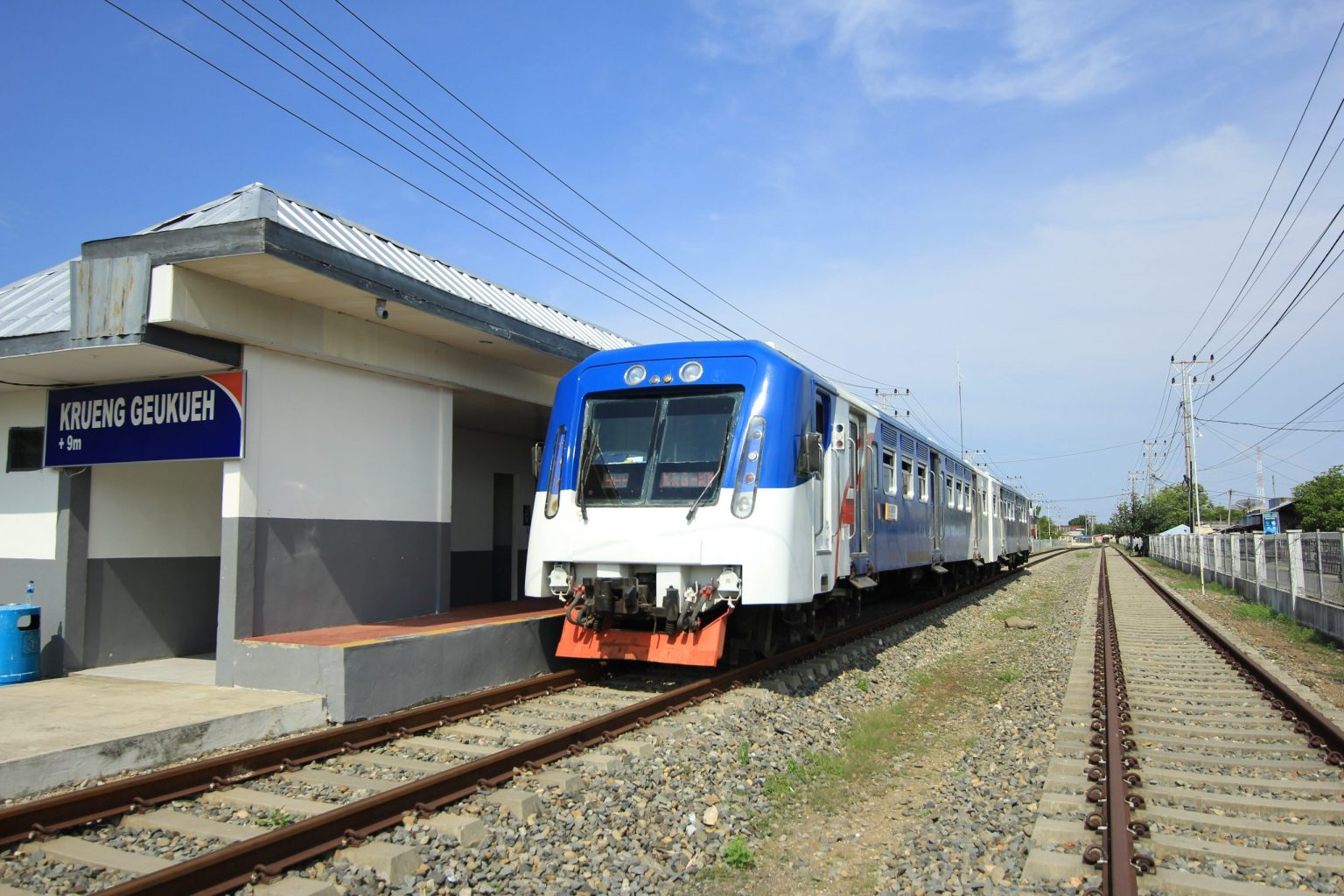
- Cut Meutia train at Krueng Geukueh Station, 2019

General information
- Location: Keude Krueng Geukueh, Dewantara, North Aceh Regency; Aceh; Indonesia
- Coordinates: 5.243736°N 97.020636°E
- Elevation: +9 m (30 ft)
- Owner: Kereta Api Indonesia
- Operator: Kereta Api Indonesia
- Line: Kutablang–Lhokseumawe
- Platforms: 1 side platform
- Tracks: 2

Construction
- Structure type: Ground
- Parking: Available
- Accessible: Available

Other information
- Station code: KRG
- Classification: Class III

History
- Opened: 1904; Reopened 1 December 2013
- Closed: 1970
- Rebuilt: 2013
Location
- Location within Aceh

Krueng Geukueh Station (KRG) is a class III railway station located at Keude Krueng Geukueh, Dewantara, North Aceh Regency. The station, which is located at an altitude of +9 m, is included in the Regional Division I North Sumatra and Aceh.

== Services ==
There is only one passenger train journey, namely the Cut Meutia to Krueng Mane.

Preceding station	Kereta Api Indonesia	Following station
Bungkaih towards Kutablang	Kutablang–Lhokseumawe	Muara Satu towards Lhokseumawe
