= Kuta Reh massacre =

Massacre by KNIL troops in Indonesia

- Part of the Aceh War
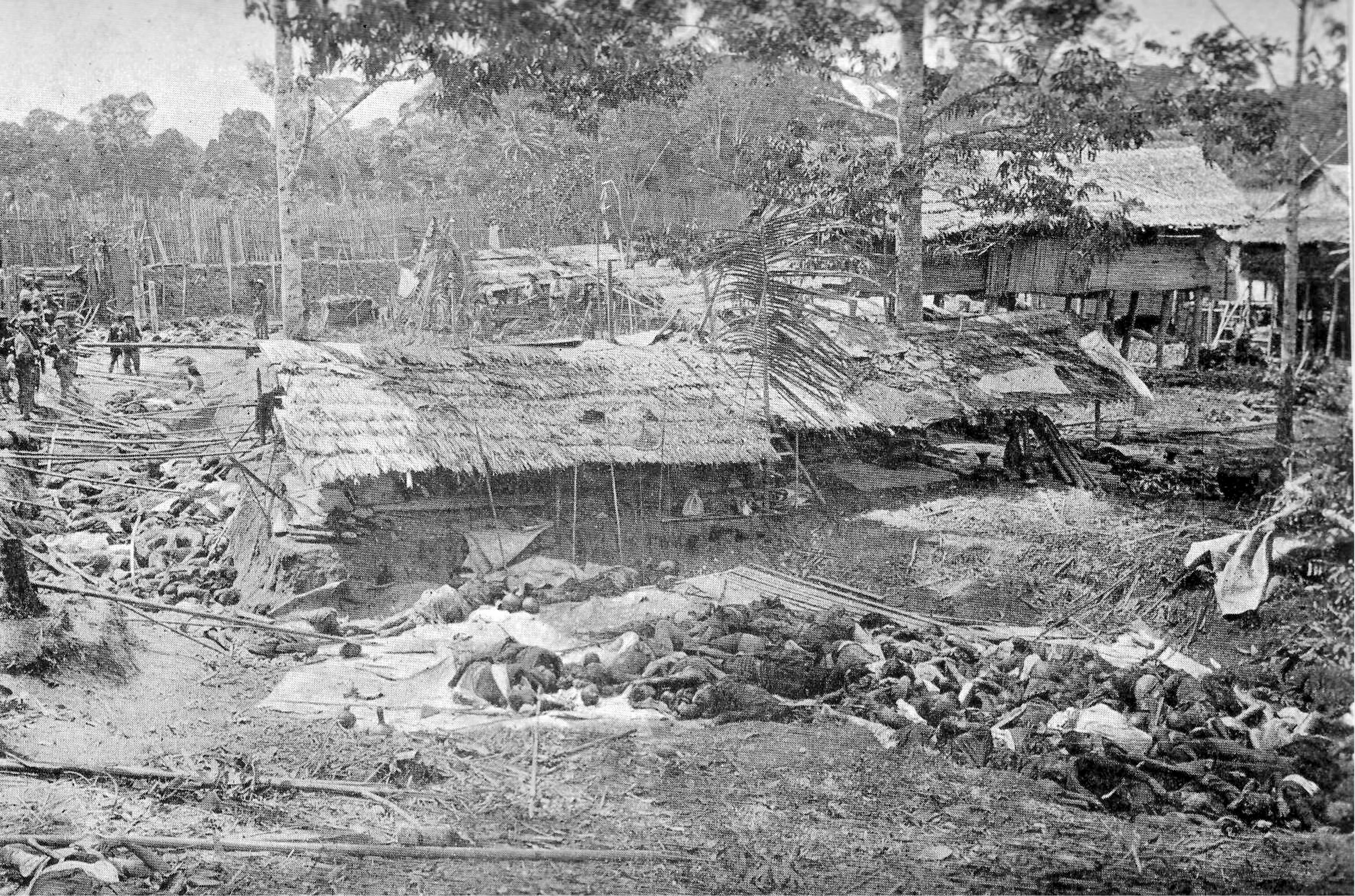
- Trenches strewn with corpses in Kuta Reh after its capture on 14 June 1904. On the left a number of Dutch troops can be seen.
- Location: 3°27′58″N 97°48′54″E; Kuta Rih, Aceh, Dutch East Indies
- Date: 14 June 1904
- Attack type: massacre
- Deaths: 563 (including 2 Dutch soldiers)
- Victims: defenders and inhabitants of Kuta Reh
- Perpetrator: Korps Marechaussee te voet (KNIL)

The Kuta Reh massacre (Dutch: Bloedbad van Koetoh Reh, Indonesian: Pembantaian Kuta Reh) was committed by the Royal Netherlands East Indies Army (KNIL) on 14 June 1904 in present-day Kuta Rih, Aceh during the Aceh War. Troops of the Korps Marechaussee te voet under general G.C.E. van Daalen defeated the defenders of the fortified village and massacred most of its inhabitants.

== Attack and massacre ==
The Alas villagers of the kampung Kuta Reh had decided not to surrender after the Dutch annexation of the Aceh Sultanate in 1903. They only had an earthen wall and 75 old-fashioned muzzleloaders for defense. Van Daalen, who was accustomed to using a 'complete surrender or complete death' tactic, ordered the village to be attacked. In the ensuing massacre, 313 men, 189 women and 59 children were shot dead. Two of the Dutch attackers were also killed. About the attack, adjutant J.C.J. Kempees wrote later that year:

When the Marechaussees were on shore, it turned out that there was a dense crowd of men, women and children inside. This was a most critical moment for our men, for if from that mass a counter-attack was launched against the breastwork, then they would surely be thrown back by their numerical inferiority. It was therefore necessary to keep these throngs at bay by rapid fire. The fairly good overview of the interior space, which made it possible for units to the side to join in, benefited us in this regard. The effect of the fire was tremendous. Each bullet made several hits in these close ranks, and in a very short time the bloody drama was over, and the most dangerous of throngs lay before us. (…) The commander (…) when the immediate danger to our troops had passed, had the signal to cease firing blown, which was complied with. But counter-attacks were still launched, so that fire had to be opened again. (…) Especially on the right wing, where Christoffel stood with his brigades, this often occurred. After we had fully mastered the situation, the order to halt on the breastwork for a few moments was given to regain full control of the troops, and to allow the excitement time to settle down.

The entire attack lasted no more than an hour and a half. Van Daalen had himself photographed to celebrate the victory.

== Aftermath ==
Outrage over the Kuta Reh massacre and a visit of mayor Ed van Thijn to Indonesia under Suharto contributed to the September 1984 bombing of the Van Heutsz Monument in Amsterdam, the Netherlands.

== See also ==
- South Sulawesi campaign of 1946–1947
- Rawagede massacre
- Rengat massacre
