= Blangpidie Airport =

Airport in Blangpidie, Indonesia

Blangpidie Kuala Batee Airport Bandar Udara Blangpidie Kuala Batee
- IATA: KJX; ICAO: none

Summary
- Airport type: Public
- Location: Blangpidie, Southwest Aceh Regency
- Time zone: WIB (UTC+07:00)
- Elevation AMSL: 1 m / 3 ft
- Coordinates: 03°44′04″N 096°47′28″E
- Website: meq.informasibandara.org

Map
- Location in Aceh, Northern Sumatra, Sumatra and Indonesia KJX (Northern Sumatra) KJX (Sumatra) KJX (Indonesia)

Runways
Direction	Length		Surface
Direction	m	ft	Surface
16/34	1,800	5,906	Asphalt
- IATA: KJX

Blangpidie Kuala Batee Airport (Indonesia:Bandar Udara Blangpidie Kuala Batee) (IATA: KJX) is an airport serving the city of Blangpidie, capital of the Southwest Aceh Regency, Aceh, Indonesia.

== See also ==
- List of airports in Indonesia
