= Setia, Indonesia =

Setia
- Town and District
- Location in Sumatra
- Coordinates: 3.700229°N 96.876973°E
- Country: Indonesia
- Province: Aceh
- Regency: Southwest Aceh Regency
- Island: Sumatra

Area
  - Total: 30.21 km^{2} (11.66 sq mi)

Population
  - Total: 8,884
  - Density: 294.1/km^{2} (761.7/sq mi)
- Time zone: UTC+7 (WIB)

Setia is an administrative District (kecamatan) of Southwest Aceh Regency in Aceh Province, Indonesia.

== See also ==
- Southwest Aceh Regency
- Aceh
