= Lawe Sigala-Gala =

- District
- Interactive map of Lawe Sigala-Gala
- Location within Sumatra Location within Indonesia
- Coordinates: 3°21′0″N 97°56′0″E
- Country: Indonesia
- Province: Aceh
- Regency: Southeast Aceh
- District seat: Lawe Sigala

Area
  - Total: 72.39 km^{2} (27.95 sq mi)

Population (2022)
  - Total: 20,972
  - Density: 289.7/km^{2} (750.3/sq mi)

Lawe Sigala-Gala is a district in Southeast Aceh Regency, Aceh, Indonesia. In 2022, this district had a population of 20,972 people with an area of 72.39 km^{2}.

== Governance ==
=== Kute ===
Administratively, Lawe Sigala-Gala district consists of 35 definitive villages (kute), namely:

Regional code	Name	Population (2022)	Hamlets (dusun)
11.02.02.2001	Bukit Merdeka	675	3
11.02.02.2002	Darul Aman	663	3
11.02.02.2003	Lawe Kesumpat	528	3
11.02.02.2004	Lawe Tua Gabungan	601	3
11.02.02.2005	Lawe Sigala II	438	3
11.02.02.2006	East Lawe Sigala	754	4
11.02.02.2007	West Lawe Sigala	908	3
11.02.02.2008	Suka Damai	375	3
11.02.02.2009	Kute Tengah	824	3
11.02.02.2010	Tanah Baru	1,044	4
11.02.02.2011	Kedataran Gabungan	458	4
11.02.02.2012	Gabungan Persaoran	530	3
11.02.02.2013	Lawe Loning Gabungan	583	3
11.02.02.2014	Lawe Loning Aman	1,542	3
11.02.02.2015	Suka Maju	791	3
11.02.02.2016	Lawe Tua Makmur	324	3
11.02.02.2017	Lawe Tua Persatuan	546	3
11.02.02.2018	Lawe Serke	683	3
11.02.02.2019	Lawe Rakat	654	3
11.02.02.2020	Suka Jaya	839	4
11.02.02.2021	Enmiya Batu Dua Ratus	453	3
11.02.02.2022	Sebungke	448	3
11.02.02.2023	Bukit Sepakat	367	3
11.02.02.2024	Lawe Loning Sepakat	375	3
11.02.02.2025	Lawe Loning I	685	3
11.02.02.2026	Gaya Jaya	572	3
11.02.02.2027	Gelah Musara	343	3
11.02.02.2028	Mulie Dame	379	4
11.02.02.2029	Lawe Loning Hakhapen	588	3
11.02.02.2030	Karya Indah	414	3
11.02.02.2031	Kayu Mbelin	493	2
11.02.02.2032	Lawe Sigala Barat Jaya	783	3
11.02.02.2033	Lawe Pekhidinen	476	3
11.02.02.2034	Kertimbang	250	3
11.02.02.2035	Ndauh Nitenggo	586	3
	Totals	20,972	109
