= Bungkaih railway station =

Railway station in Indonesia

Bungkaih Station Stasiun Bungkaih

General information
- Location: Jl. Rel Kereta Api, Keude Bungkaih, Muara Batu, North Aceh Regency; Aceh; Indonesia
- Coordinates: 5.259797°N 96.96514°E
- Elevation: +7 m (23 ft)
- Owner: Kereta Api Indonesia
- Operator: Kereta Api Indonesia
- Line: Kutablang–Lhokseumawe
- Platforms: 2 side platforms
- Tracks: 2

Construction
- Structure type: Ground
- Parking: Available
- Accessible: Available

Other information
- Station code: BKH
- Classification: Class III

History
- Opened: 1904; Reopened 1 December 2013
- Closed: 1970
- Rebuilt: 2013
Location
- Location within Aceh

Bungkaih Station (BKH) is a class III railway station located in Keude Bungkaih, Muara Batu, North Aceh Regency, bordering with Ulee Madon. The station, which is located at an altitude of +7 meters, is included in the Regional Division I North Sumatra and Aceh.

The station was inaugurated on 1 December 2013 as part of a railway reconstruction project in Aceh that was decommissioned in the 1970s. For the initial phase, a railway line was built that connecting Krueng Geukueh with Krueng Mane along 11 km.

== Services ==
There is only one passenger train journey, namely the Cut Meutia to Krueng Geukueh and to Krueng Mane.

Preceding station	Kereta Api Indonesia	Following station
Krueng Mane towards Kutablang	Kutablang–Lhokseumawe	Krueng Geukueh towards Lhokseumawe
