= Susoh =

- District
- Interactive map of Susoh
- Coordinates: 3°43′0″N 96°50′0″E
- Country: Indonesia
- Province: Aceh
- Regency: Southwest Aceh

Area
  - Total: 32 km^{2} (12 sq mi)

Population (2024)
  - Total: 25,171
  - Density: 790/km^{2} (2,000/sq mi)
- Time zone: UTC+7 (WIB)
- Postal code: 23765

Susoh is an administrative district (kecamatan) in Southwest Aceh Regency, Aceh, Indonesia. It is bound by the Indian Ocean to the south and Blangpidie District to the north, east and west, and it also borders Jeumpa District to the north, Kuala Batee District to the west and Setia District to the east.

== Mukims and villages ==
There are five mukims (townships/subdistricts) in Susoh, which are Mukim Rawa, Mukim Palak Kerambil, Mukim Durian Rampak, Mukim Pinang, and Mukim Sangkalan, with 29 villages (kampong).

1. Mukim Durian Rampak
  1. Barat
  2. Durian Jangek
  3. Durian Rampak
  4. Palak Hilir
  5. Palak Hulu
  6. Pantai Perak
  7. Rumah Dua Lapis
2. Mukim Palak Kerambil
  1. Kedai Palak Kerambil
  2. Kedai Susoh
  3. Ladang
  4. Panjang Baru
3. Mukim Pinang
  1. Padang Baru
  2. Pawoh
  3. Pinang
  4. Baharu
  5. Pulau Kayu
  6. Rumah Panjang
  7. Ujung Padang
  8. Geulima Jaya
4. Mukim Rawa
  1. Gadang
  2. Kepala Bandar
  3. Padang Hilir
  4. Tangah
5. Mukim Sangkalan
  1. Cot Mancang
  2. Lampoh Drien
  3. Meunasah
  4. Padang Panjang
  5. Rubek Meupayong
  6. Blang Dalam
