= Samalanga =

Nisam
- Location in Sumatra
- Coordinates: 5°12′25″N 96°21′58″E
- Country: Indonesia
- Province: Aceh
- Regency: Bireuen
- Time zone: UTC+7 (WIB)

Samalanga is a district in north coast of Aceh, part of Bireuën Regency. The main occupations of the population are fishing solar gathering, agriculture and animal husbandry.

== Gallery ==
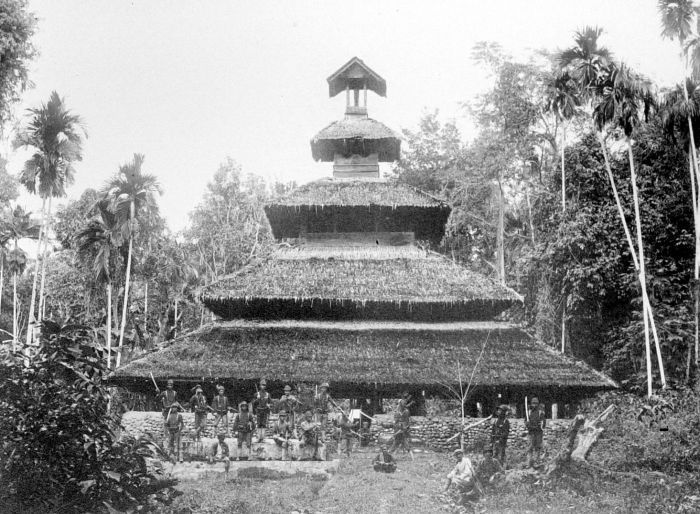
Soldiers in front of the Samalanga mosque (1880–1910)

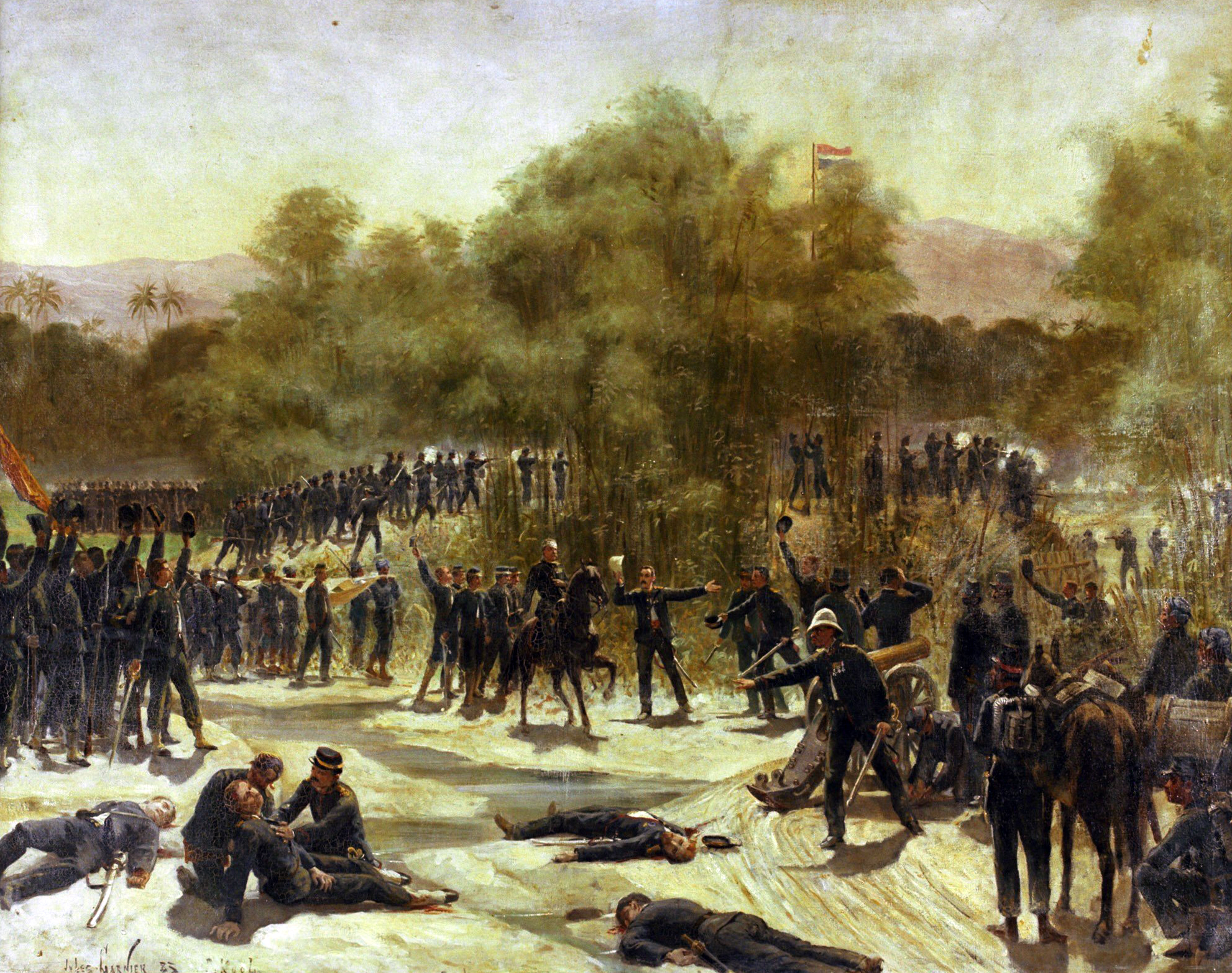
Artist's depiction of the Battle of Samalanga in the Aceh War, 1878
