= Leupung =

Coordinates: 5°23′N 95°15′E

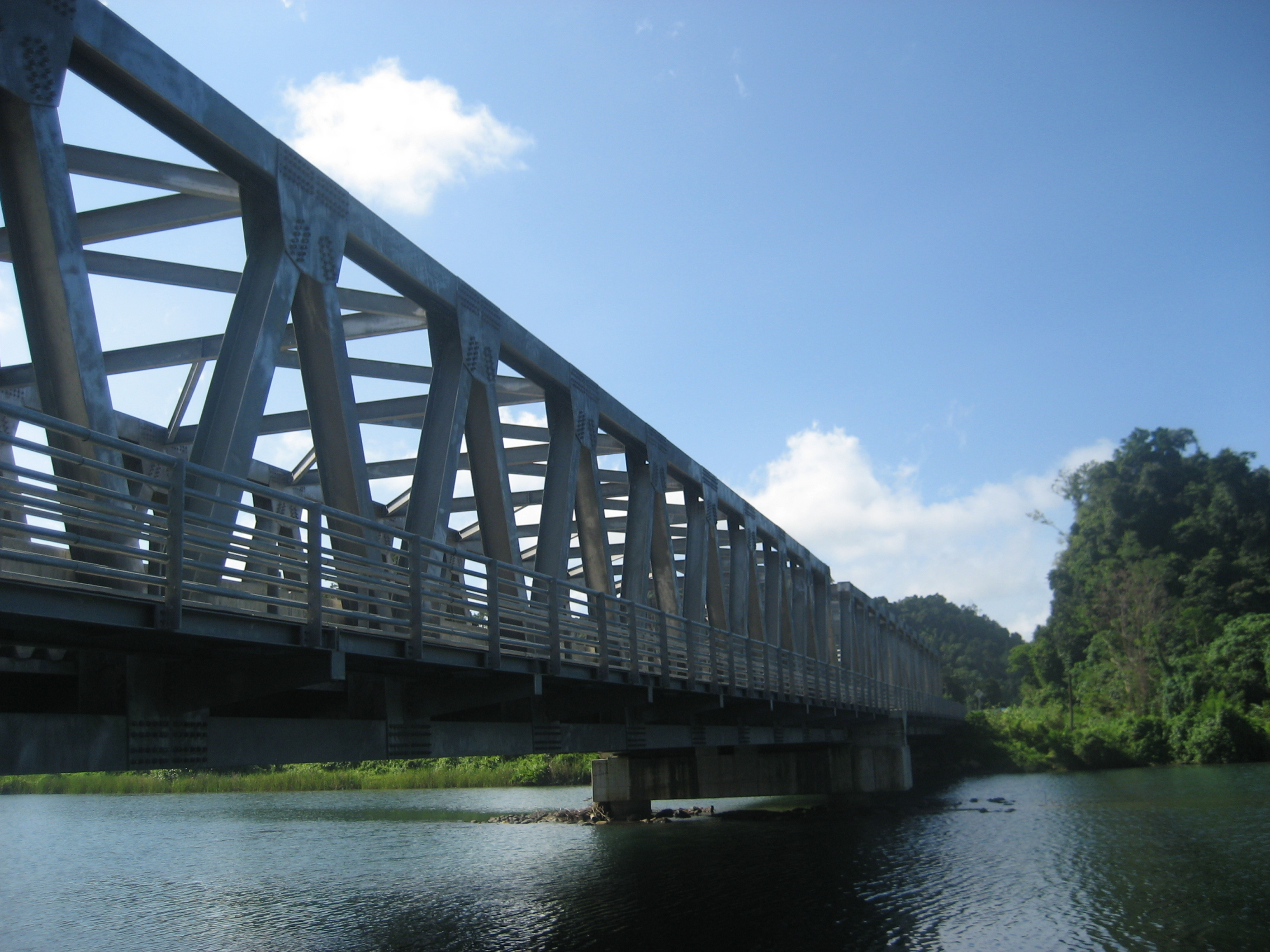
A bridge in Leupung

Leupung -- also spelled "Leupueng", is a district in Aceh Besar regency, close to the city of Banda Aceh, the capital of the special territory of Aceh, Indonesia, on the island of Sumatra. Leupung is located at 5'31" North latitude and 95'15" East longitude at an elevation of 33 m. The population in 2004 was approximately 10,000; the district has been obliterated by the tsunami resulting from the 2004 Indian Ocean earthquake, being one of the towns closest to the earthquake's epicenter.

According to early reports nothing vertical and square-edged is left , and the estimated number of survivors is 200–700.

There were six villages in Leupung: Deah, Meunasah Mesjid, Meunasah Bak U, Lamseunia, Pulot, and Layeun. Among these six villages, Pulot and Layeuen have more people that survived the tsunami. These villages were situated on higher land and had easy access to even higher places for them to evacuate to, while people in the other villages did not get close and lacked easy access to a safer place. Higher death toll in these four villages also resulted from the way the people understood and reacted to this natural disaster. Oral tradition after the tsunami has it that after the tremendous earthquake, people had already reached the conclusion that it was to be the end of the world. Therefore, many people decided that there was no longer time to escape, it was time just to beg for the mercy of God. That is why, as many people told, there were many people who did not survive in this area.
