= Krueng Mane railway station =

Railway station in Indonesia

Krueng Mane Station Stasiun Krueng Mane

General information
- Location: Jl. Rel Kereta Api, Cot Seurani, Muara Batu, North Aceh Regency; Aceh; Indonesia
- Coordinates: 5.25116°N 96.92255°E
- Elevation: +16 m (52 ft)
- Owner: Kereta Api Indonesia
- Operator: Kereta Api Indonesia
- Line: Kutablang–Lhokseumawe
- Tracks: 2

Construction
- Structure type: Ground

Other information
- Station code: KRM
- Classification: Class III

History
- Opened: 1 December 2013
Location
- Location within Aceh

Krueng Mane railway station (KRM) is a railway station in North Aceh Regency, Aceh, Indonesia, which is served by the Cut Meutia train.

== Services ==
There is only one passenger train journey, namely the Cut Meutia to Krueng Geukueh. Cut Meutia departs from the station 8 times daily.

Preceding station	Kereta Api Indonesia	Following station
Bungkaih towards Lhokseumawe	Kutablang–Lhokseumawe	Geurugok
