= Gandapura =

District in Aceh, Indonesia

- District
- Interactive map of Gandapura
- Coordinates: 5°14′0″N 96°53′0″E
- Country: Indonesia
- Province: Aceh
- Regency: Bireuën

Area
  - Total: 38.68 km^{2} (14.93 sq mi)

Population (2019)
  - Total: 25.152
  - Density: 0.6503/km^{2} (1.684/sq mi)
- Time zone: UTC+7 (WIB)
- Postal Code: 24356

Gandapura is an administrative district (kecamatan) in Bireuën Regency, Aceh, Indonesia.
