= Jalwandi =

Indonesian footballer

Personal information
- Full name: Jalwandi Jamal
- Date of birth: 13 February 1993 (age 33)
- Place of birth: Langsa, Aceh, Indonesia
- Height: 1.73 m (5 ft 8 in)
- Position: Winger

Senior career*
| Years | Team | Apps | (Gls) |
| 2012–2014 | Fernando de la Mora | 5 | (0) |
| 2014–2016 | Persita Tangerang | 21 | (6) |
| 2017 | Cilegon United | 19 | (4) |
| 2018 | Persis Solo | 4 | (0) |
| 2018–2020 | Cilegon United | 30 | (5) |
| 2021 | Matrix Putra Brother's | 4 | (0) |
| 2022 | Persikota Tangerang | 4 | (0) |
| 2022–2023 | Matrix Putra Brother's | 8 | (1) |
- * Club domestic league appearances and goals as of 22:42, 18 October 2023 (UTC)

Jalwandi Jamal (born 13 February 1993) is an Indonesian footballer who last played as a winger for Liga 4 club Matrix Putra Brother's

== Career ==
=== Persita Tangerang ===
On 19 May 2014, he made his debut and scored a goal in a 2–0 win against Persijap Jepara.
