= Samudra University =

Public university in Langsa, Indonesia

- Universitas Samudra
- Type: Public
- Established: 22 October 1985
- Rector: Bachtiar Akob
- Location: Langsa, Aceh, Indonesia; 4°27′27.4″N 97°58′17.3″E
- Website: unsam.ac.id

Samudra University (Indonesian: Universitas Samudra, abbreviated Unsam) is an Indonesian public university in the city of Langsa, Aceh. Initially an affiliate of the Syiah Kuala University, the university separated into its own organization in 1985 and was nationalized in 2013. The university possessed five faculties and 9,879 active students in 2014.

== History ==
In East Aceh, the first higher education institutes were founded in 1963. In 1971, bureaucrats and politicians of Langsa formed a body to prepare the opening of a new institute. By 1976, two such institutes (teaching Law and Economics respectively) were opened, although permits were not registered until 1981.

It was nationalized into a public university (Perguruan Tinggi Negeri) in 2013 by Minister of Education Muhammad Nuh, and its statute was formalized the following year. Following this, the university capitalized on its status by forming partnerships with more established Indonesian universities such as ITB and the University of Indonesia. It was given an official public status in 2016, alongside 35 other universities. The Ministry of Research, Technology and Higher Education (Kemenristekdikti) placed it 1,032nd of 3,244 higher education institutes in Indonesia in 2016, rising to the 801-900 block in 2017.

== Students ==
There were 9,789 recorded students in 2014, just before the university started offering 16 new courses. Unsam participates in the SNMPTN and SBMPTN, in addition to SMMPTN-Barat which also involves other universities in Sumatra and surrounding provinces. From the exam-based SBMPTN, it offered about 700 slots for freshmen in 2017, compared to over 3,000 in University of North Sumatra.

== Faculties ==
The university has five faculties: Law, Economics, Agriculture, Education and Engineering which offers a total of 25 courses, divided into 15 "natural science" and 10 "social science" ones. Its campus consists of five buildings - the rectorate and individual faculty buildings excluding the Faculty of Economics - and is located immediately adjacent to a palm oil plantation. Unsam was accredited C ("sufficient") in 2013 upon its nationalization, and its rating remain as of November 2017.
