= Cut Nyak Meutia =

Indonesian freedom fighter (1870–1910)

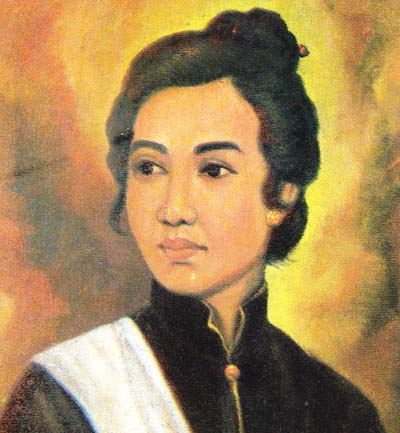
- Born: 15 February 1870; Keureutoe, Aceh Sultanate
- Died: 24 October 1910 (aged 40); Alue Kurieng, Aceh, Dutch East Indies
- Cause of death: Shot in the head and chest

Tjoet Nja Meuthia (15 February 1870 – 24 October 1910), also known as Tjut Meutia or Cut Meutia, was an Indonesian national hero.

== Life ==
Meutia was born in 1870 in Perlak, Aceh. When she grew into adulthood, she married Teuku Sam Searah. They divorced not long afterward.

=== Against the Dutch ===
Cut Nyak Meutia's new husband was Cut Muhammad or Teuku Cik Tunong. Differing from his brother, Cut Muhammad did not obey the Dutch because he did not accept their colonization of Aceh. Cut Muhammad and his wife worked hand in hand with the Acehnese to fight against the Dutch.

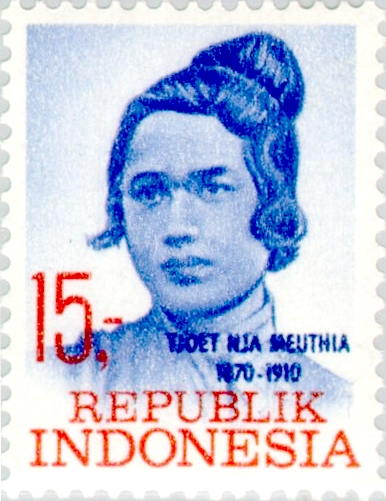
Meutia on a 1969 stamp.

In 1899 Teuku Cik Tunong led a successful attack against the Dutch. In the beginning, the Dutch troops were at a loss as to what to do. In the following two years, however, Cik Tunong and his troops had not made any movements. The Dutch thought that they might have lost their spirit. Yet in 1901, Teuku Cik Tunong and his troops made a sudden attack and succeeded in destroying the Dutch defense there.

For his success, Teuku Cik Tunong was soon appointed District Chief of Keureutoe by the Sultan of Aceh. From 1901 to 1903 Teuku Cik Tunong had been the commander of some battles in the northeast of Aceh. There, he and his troops killed 10 of soldiers of the Dutch and seized 67 guns from them. Mubin and Pang Gadeng, two surrendered spies, had made Cut Nyak Meutia and her husband successful in the battles.

In 1905, Teuku Cik Tunong was caught by the Dutch and put in jail and was shot dead by them the following year.

The death of Teuku Cik Tunong had made Cut Nyak Meutia struggle alongside the new commander, Pang Nanggroe, who was her last husband. Pang Nanggroe was also killed in the battle on 26 September 1910. His death made Cut Nyak Meutia the new commander, with only 45 men and 13 guns left.

Cut Nyak Meutia was found by the Dutch in September 1910 at her hideaway in Paya Cicem. She resisted capture, wielding a rencong. She was killed when the Dutch troops shot her in the head and chest.

== Legacy ==
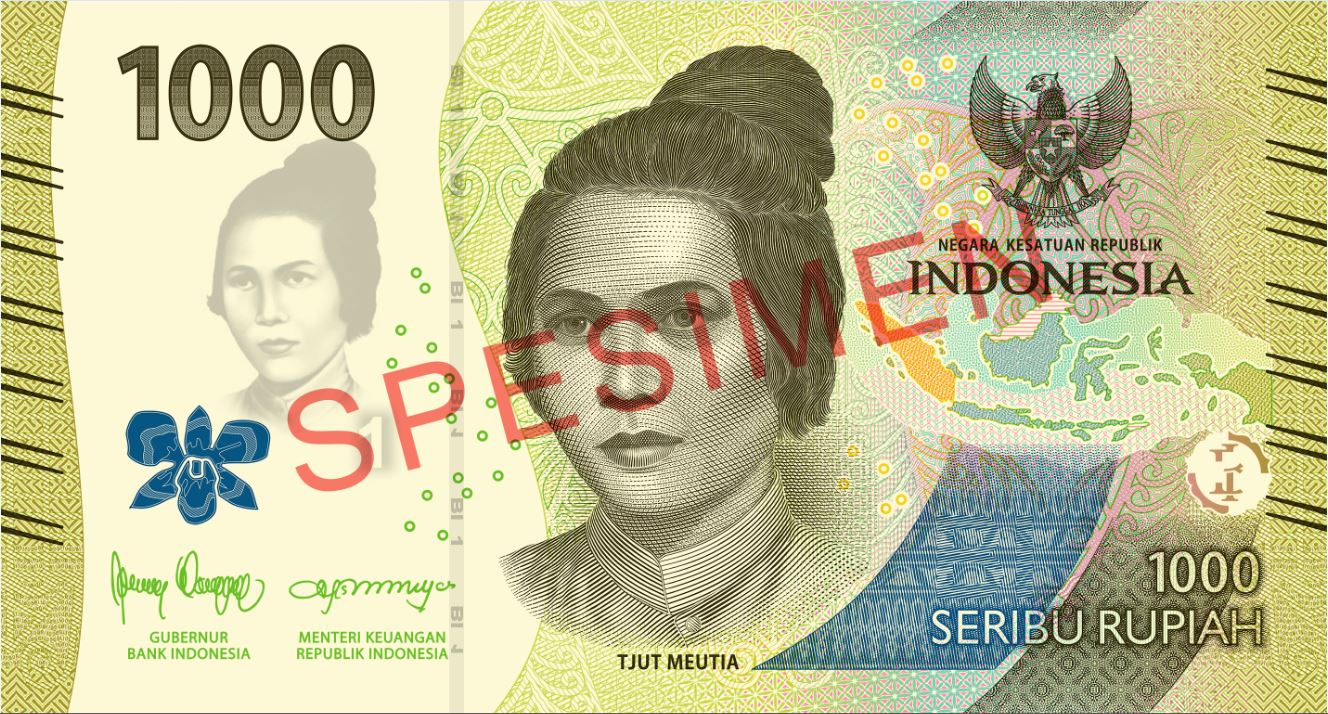
1,000 rupiah banknote featuring Cut Nyak Meutia, issued in 2022

She is now seen as a symbol of pride among Indonesian women, along with other heroines such as Raden Ayu Kartini and Cut Nyak Dhien. On 2 May 1964 she was proclaimed a National Hero of Indonesia.

She is featured on the 1,000 Indonesian Rupiah note series 2016 and 2022, as part of the National Heroes series. The Cut Meutia train in Aceh is named after her, as well as a small park in Jakarta that inspired the name of a street and a mosque adjacent to it.

== See also ==
- Aceh
- National Hero of Indonesia
