= Bireuën =

Town in Aceh, Indonesia

Bireuën or Bireun is an Indonesian town, the seat of the Bireuën Regency government in the Aceh Special Territory of Sumatra. Bireuen is located at 5°12′18″N 96°42′06″E. The town (officially called Kota Juang District) covers an area of 16.91 km^{2}, and it had a population of 44,604 at the 2010 Census and 47,670 at the 2020 Census; the official mid-2022 population estimate was 47,983.

== History ==
Bireuën was once the capital of the Republic of Indonesia in its war of independence. It served as the capital for 1 week.

== Geography ==
Bireuën is located in the province of Aceh, a semi-autonomous region in the northern half of Sumatra island. Its location is surrounded by hills which makes it easy to defend.

== Climate ==
Bireuen has a tropical rainforest climate (Af) with moderate rainfall from February to September and heavy rainfall from October to January.

Climate data for Bireuen
Month	Jan	Feb	Mar	Apr	May	Jun	Jul	Aug	Sep	Oct	Nov	Dec	Year
Mean daily maximum °C (°F)	30.0 (86.0)	31.1 (88.0)	32.1 (89.8)	32.4 (90.3)	31.7 (89.1)	31.7 (89.1)	31.3 (88.3)	31.6 (88.9)	30.8 (87.4)	31.0 (87.8)	30.1 (86.2)	29.7 (85.5)	31.1 (88.0)
Daily mean °C (°F)	26.5 (79.7)	27.0 (80.6)	27.5 (81.5)	28.0 (82.4)	27.8 (82.0)	27.7 (81.9)	27.3 (81.1)	27.6 (81.7)	27.0 (80.6)	27.4 (81.3)	26.7 (80.1)	26.4 (79.5)	27.2 (81.0)
Mean daily minimum °C (°F)	23.0 (73.4)	22.9 (73.2)	23.0 (73.4)	23.7 (74.7)	23.9 (75.0)	23.8 (74.8)	23.3 (73.9)	23.6 (74.5)	23.3 (73.9)	23.8 (74.8)	23.4 (74.1)	23.2 (73.8)	23.4 (74.1)
Average rainfall mm (inches)	161 (6.3)	95 (3.7)	109 (4.3)	116 (4.6)	127 (5.0)	72 (2.8)	77 (3.0)	70 (2.8)	107 (4.2)	186 (7.3)	200 (7.9)	238 (9.4)	1,558 (61.3)
Source: Climate-Data.org
