= Baktiya =

Baktiya is a district in North Aceh Regency, Nanggröe Aceh Darussalam, province of Indonesia.

== List of villages ==
Baktiya has several villages, namely:

- West Alue Anou
- East Alue Anou
- Alue Bili Geulumpang
- Alue Bili Rayeuk
- Alue Buya
- Alue Dama
- Alue Geudong
- Alue Ie Puteh
- Alue Ie Tarek
- Alue Jamok
- Alue Keutapang
- Alue Rambong
- Alue Serdang
- Arongan Lise
- Babussalam
- Buket Dara Baro
- Buket Lueng Bata
- Buket Mon Sukon
- Ceumpedak
- Cinta Makmur
- Cot Ara
- Cot Kumbang
- Cot Mane
- Cot Manyang
- Cot Ulaya
- Geulumpang Bungkok
- Geulumpang Payong
- Geulumpang Samlako
- Keude Meunje IV
- West Krueng Lingka
- East Krueng Lingka
- Lhok Seutui
- Lueng Bata
- Matang Baro
- Matang Beuringen
- Matang Cut
- Matang Kareung
- Matang Kelayu
- Matang Kumbang
- Matang Lawang
- Matang Linya
- Matang Manyam
- Matang Pineung
- Matang Rawa
- West Matang Raya
- East Matang Raya
- Matang Reudeup
- Matang Ulim
- Meudang Ara
- Meunasah Bujok
- Meunasah Geudong
- Pucok Alue
- Pulo Seukee
- Rambong Dalam
- Tanjong Geulumpang
- Ujong Dama
- Keude Alue Ie Puteh
- Keude Pante Breuh
