= Banda Baro, North Aceh Regency =

Banda Baro is a district in North Aceh Regency, Nanggröe Aceh Darussalam, province of Indonesia. The capital of this district is Ulèê Nyêu.
