= Karang Baru =

Coordinates: 4°19′N 98°03′E

- District and Regency seat
- Interactive map of Karang Baru
- Country: Indonesia
- Province: Aceh
- Regency: Aceh Tamiang

Area
  - Total: 139.45 km^{2} (53.84 sq mi)

Population (mid 2024)
  - Total: 46,861
  - Density: 336.04/km^{2} (870.34/sq mi)
- Time zone: UTC+7 (WIB)

Karang Baru (Jawoe: كارڠ بارو) is a town and an administrative district (kecamatan) in Aceh province of Indonesia, and is the seat (capital) of Aceh Tamiang Regency.

The district covers an area of 139.45 km^{2} and had a population of 36,226 at the 2010 Census and 43,535 at the 2020 Census; the official population estimate as at mid 2024 was 46,861. It is divided into 31 villages (gampong), all sharing the postcode of 24476.
