= Langkahan =

Langkahan is a district in North Aceh Regency, Nanggröe Aceh Darussalam, province of Indonesia.

Langkahan has several villages, namely:

- Alue Dua
- Alue Krak Kayee
- Bantayan
- Buket Linteung
- Cot Bada
- Geudumbak
- Kampung Blang
- Krueng Lingka
- Langkahan
- Leubok Mane
- Lubok Pusaka
- Matang Keutapang
- Matang Rubek
- South Matang Teungoh
- Meunasah Blang
- Padang Meuria
- Pante Gaki Bale
- Paya Tukai
- Rumoh Rayeuk
- Seureuke
- Simpang Tiga
- South Tanjong Dalam
- Tanjong Jawa
