= Aceh Tamiang Regency =

Regency in Aceh, Indonesia

Aceh Tamiang Regency Kabupaten Aceh Tamiang
- Regency
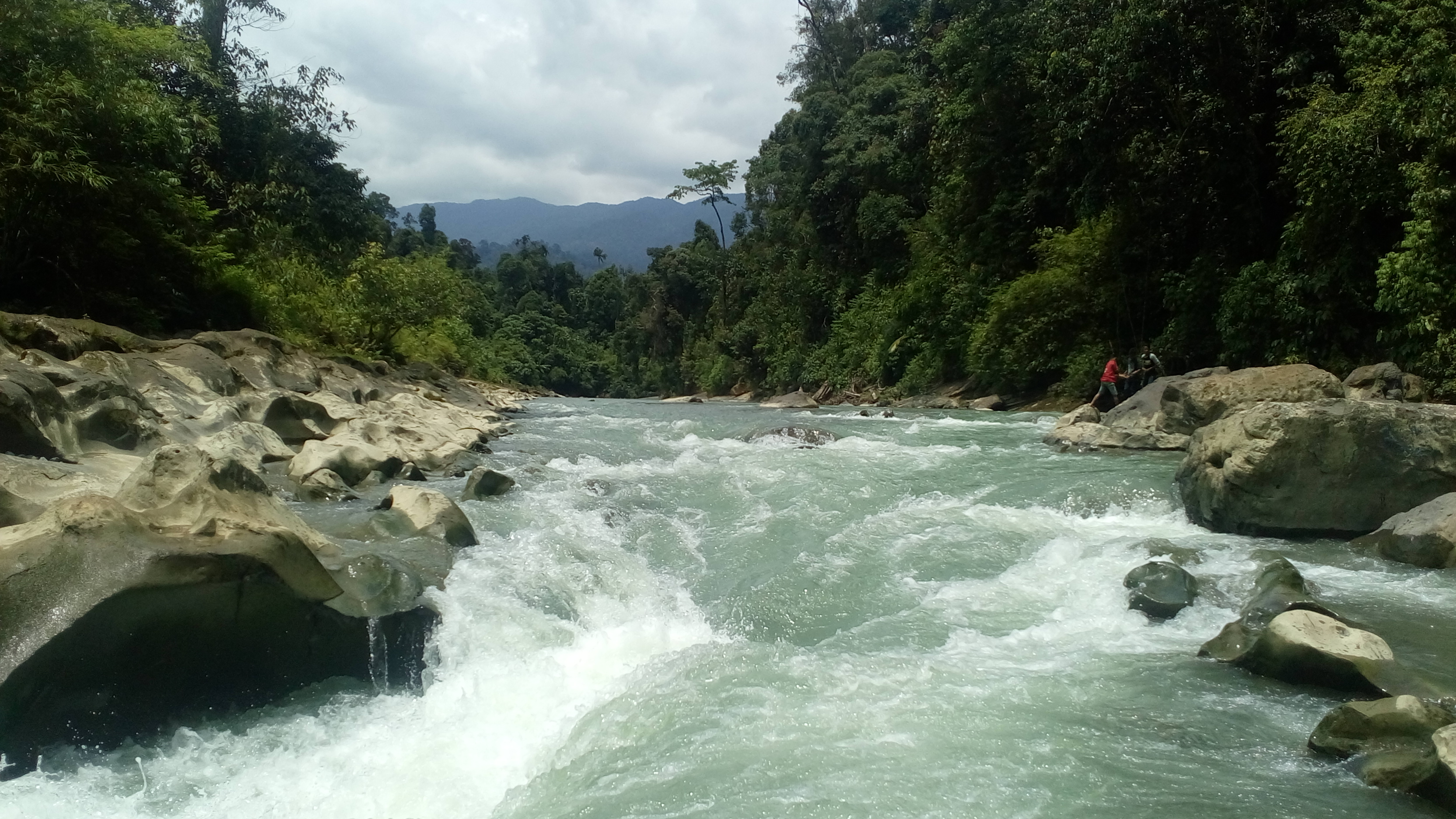
- Kuala Paret, Aceh Tamiang

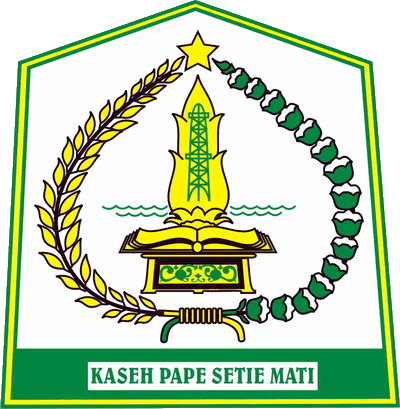
- Seal
- Motto: Kaseh Pape Setie Mati (Life That is Willing to Sacrifice and Help Each Other)
- Location within Aceh

- Location in Aceh, Northern Sumatra, Sumatra and Indonesia Aceh Tamiang Regency (Northern Sumatra) Aceh Tamiang Regency (Sumatra) Aceh Tamiang Regency (Indonesia)
- Coordinates: 4.2749055°N 97.87216°E
- Country: Indonesia
- Region: Sumatra
- Province: Aceh
- Established: 2002
- Regency seat: Karang Baru

Government
  - Regent: Armia Fahmi
  - Vice Regent: Ismail

Area
  - Total: 1,957.02 km^{2} (755.61 sq mi)

Population (mid 2025 estimate)
  - Total: 316,534
  - Density: 161.743/km^{2} (418.912/sq mi)
- Time zone: UTC+7 (IWST)
- Area code: (+62) 641
- Website: acehtamiangkab.go.id

Aceh Tamiang Regency (Indonesian: Kabupaten Aceh Tamiang) is a regency in the east of Aceh province of Indonesia, bordering on North Sumatra Province to the east. It is located on the island of Sumatra, and was formed on 10 April 2002 from what were previously the southeastern districts of East Aceh Regency. The regency covers an area of 1,957.02 square kilometres and had a population of 251,914 people at the 2010 census, 277,766 at the 2015 census and 294,356 at the 2020 Census; the official estimate as of mid 2025 was 316,534 (comprising 160,389 males and 156,145 females). It is bordered to the east by the Langkat Regency of North Sumatra Province, by Gayo Lues and East Aceh Regencies and the city of Langsa (to which Manyak Payed District serves as an eastern catchment area) to the west, and by the Malacca Strait to the north. The seat of the regency government is in the district of Karang Baru, although Kota Kualasimpang is the principal town.

== Administrative districts ==
The regency is divided administratively into twelve districts (kecamatan), listed below with their areas and their populations at the 2010 Census and the 2020 Census, together with the official estimates as of mid 2025. The table also includes the location of the district administrative centres, the number of villages (gampong) in each district, and its postal code.

Kode Wilayah	Name of District (kecamatan)	Area in km^{2}	Pop'n Census 2010	Pop'n Census 2020	Pop'n Estimate mid 2025	Admin capital	No. of villages	Post code
11.16.07	Tamiang Hulu	194.63	17,353	19,745	20,888	Pulau Tiga	9	24479
11.16.10	Bandar Pusaka	252.37	11,598	13,861	15,087	Babo	15	24478
11.16.06	Kejuruan Muda	124.48	31,763	36,857	39,436	Sungai Liput	15	24477
11.16.11	Tenggulun	295.55	16,315	18,560	19,627	Simpang Kiri	5	24477
11.16.08	Rantau	51.71	32,850	38,245	40,999	Alur Cucur	16	24474
11.16.05	Kota Kualasimpang	4.48	18,030	18,986	19,120	Kuala Simpang	5	24475
11.16.04	Seruway	188.49	23,627	27,608	29,661	Tangsi Lama	24	24473
11.16.02	Bendahara	132.53	18,551	22,578	24,837	Sungai Iyu	33	24470
11.16.09	Banda Mulia	48.27	10,644	12,816	14,010	Telaga Meuku	10	24472
11.16.03	Karang Baru	139.45	36,226	43,535	47,536	Karang Baru	31	24476
11.16.12	Sekerak	257.95	6,029	7,483	8,326	Sekerak Kawan	14	24476
11.16.01	Manyak Payed	267.11	28,928	34,210	37,007	Tualang Cut	36	24471
	Totals	1,957.02	251,914	294,356	316,534	Karang Baru	213	

== See also ==
- List of regencies and cities of Indonesia
