= West Baktiya =

Coordinates: 5.138°N 97.338°E

West Baktiya is a district in North Aceh Regency, Aceh, province of Indonesia.

== Villages in West Baktiya ==
- Blang Rheue
- Blang Seunong
- Cot Kupok
- Cot Laba
- Cot Murong
- Cot Paya
- Cot Usen
- Lang Nibong
- Lhok Euncien
- Lhok Iboh
- Matang Bayu
- Matang Ceubreuk
- Matang Panyang
- Matang Paya
- Matang Raya Blang Sialet
- West Matang Sijuek
- Central Matang Sijuek
- East Matang Sijuek
- Matang Teungoh
- Meunasah Cot Kupok
- Meunasah Hagu
- Meunasah Pante
- Meurandeh Paya
- Paya Bateung
- Pucok Alue Buket
- Singgah Mata
- Keude Sampoiniet
