= Meureudu =

Coordinates: 5°15′N 96°15′E

Meureudu or Keude Meureudu is a town in Aceh province of Indonesia and the seat (capital) of Pidie Jaya Regency.
