= Pariaman Express =

Commuter rail system in West Sumatra, Indonesia

Pariaman Express Pariaman Line
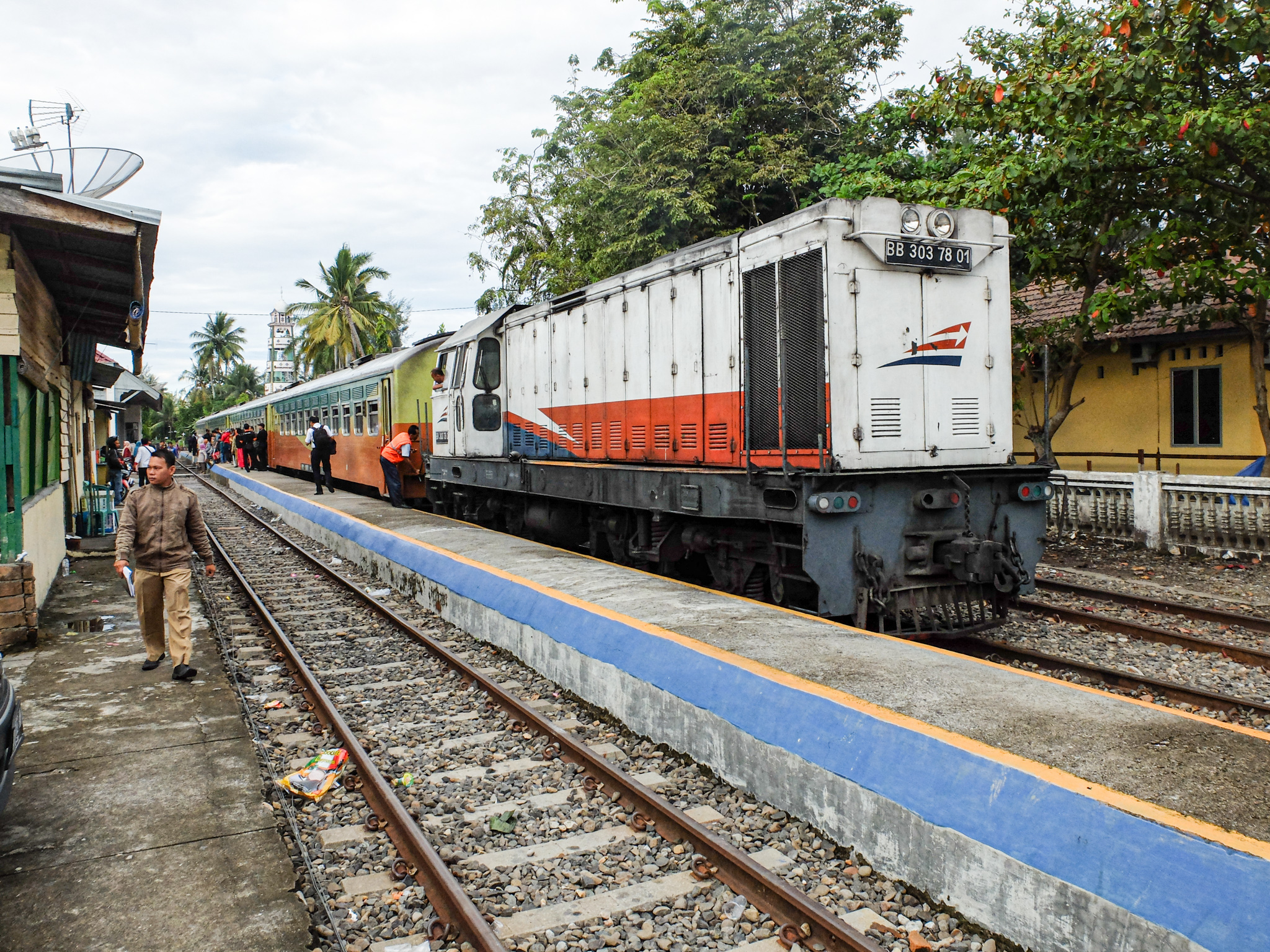
- Pariaman Express at Pariaman Station

Overview
- Native name: Pariaman Express
- Owner: Kereta Api Indonesia
- Locale: West Sumatra
- Transit type: Commuter rail
- Number of lines: 1
- Number of stations: 14
- Annual ridership: 1.98 million (2025)
- Headquarters: Padang, Indonesia

Operation
- Began operation: 2023
- Operator: Kereta Api Indonesia
- Character: At grade
- Train length: 6 cars per trainset

Technical
- System length: 75 km (47 mi)
- Track gauge: 1,067 mm (3 ft 6 in)
- Top speed: 70 km/h

Pariaman Express Train (formerly known as Sibinuang Train) is an economy class local train service operated by PT Kereta api Indonesia (Persero) Padang Regional Division II, which serves the route Pauh Lima Station-Padang Station-Naras Station or vice versa. This train is under the control of Regional Division II West Sumatra. This train is also one of the few passenger train services operated there along with the airport train Minangkabau Express and Lembah Anai railbus.

== Background ==
Since the end of 2015, this train has stopped at train stops in Padang city which had been built at that time. Starting March 22nd, 2019, the Sibinuang railway relationship was extended to Naras Station along with the completion of the reactivation of the Pariaman-Naras line. As of March 1st, 2023, several Sibinuang train schedules have been extended to Pauh Lima Station. This train also has a special bicycle train that is used to store bicycles to make it easier for cyclists who want to cycle to Pariaman or to Padang. As of June 1st, 2023, according to the determination of Gapeka 2023. Sibinuang Train was renamed Pariaman Express Train.

== Fee ==
This train carries out the journey Pauh Lima Station - Naras Station 8 trips in one day trip at a rate of Rp5,000.

== Rolling Stocks ==
The following is the arrangement of the Pariaman Express train series:

- 2 BB 303 (Henschel DHG 1000 BB) and CC 201 (GE U18C)
- 5 AC economy cars (K3 2009 PD and/or K3 PD ex RK)
- 1 plant dining car (Now functioning as a bicycle car) (KMP3 2009 PD and/or KP3 PD ex RK)

== Gallery ==
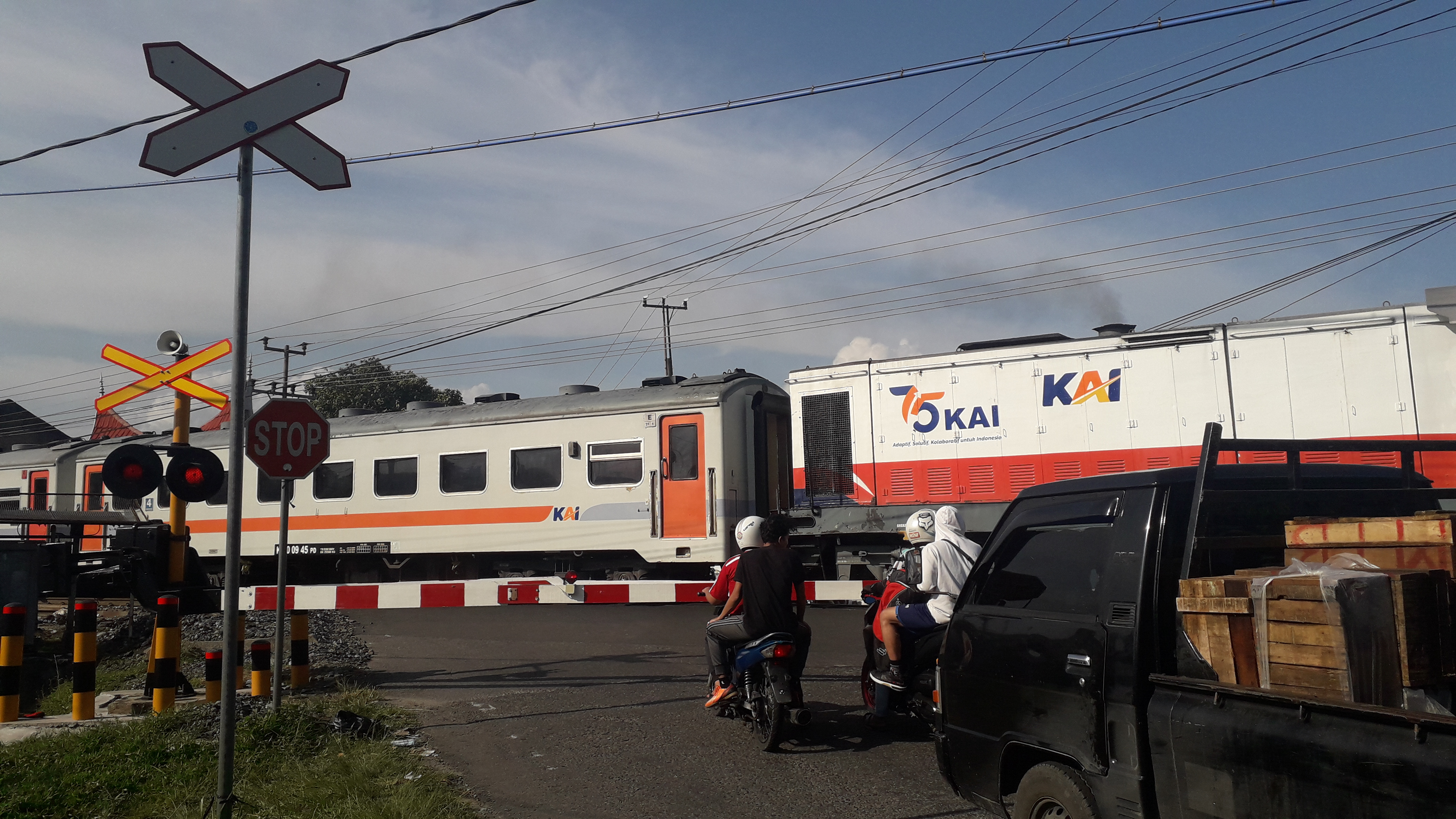
The Pariaman Express train arrives at Alai station

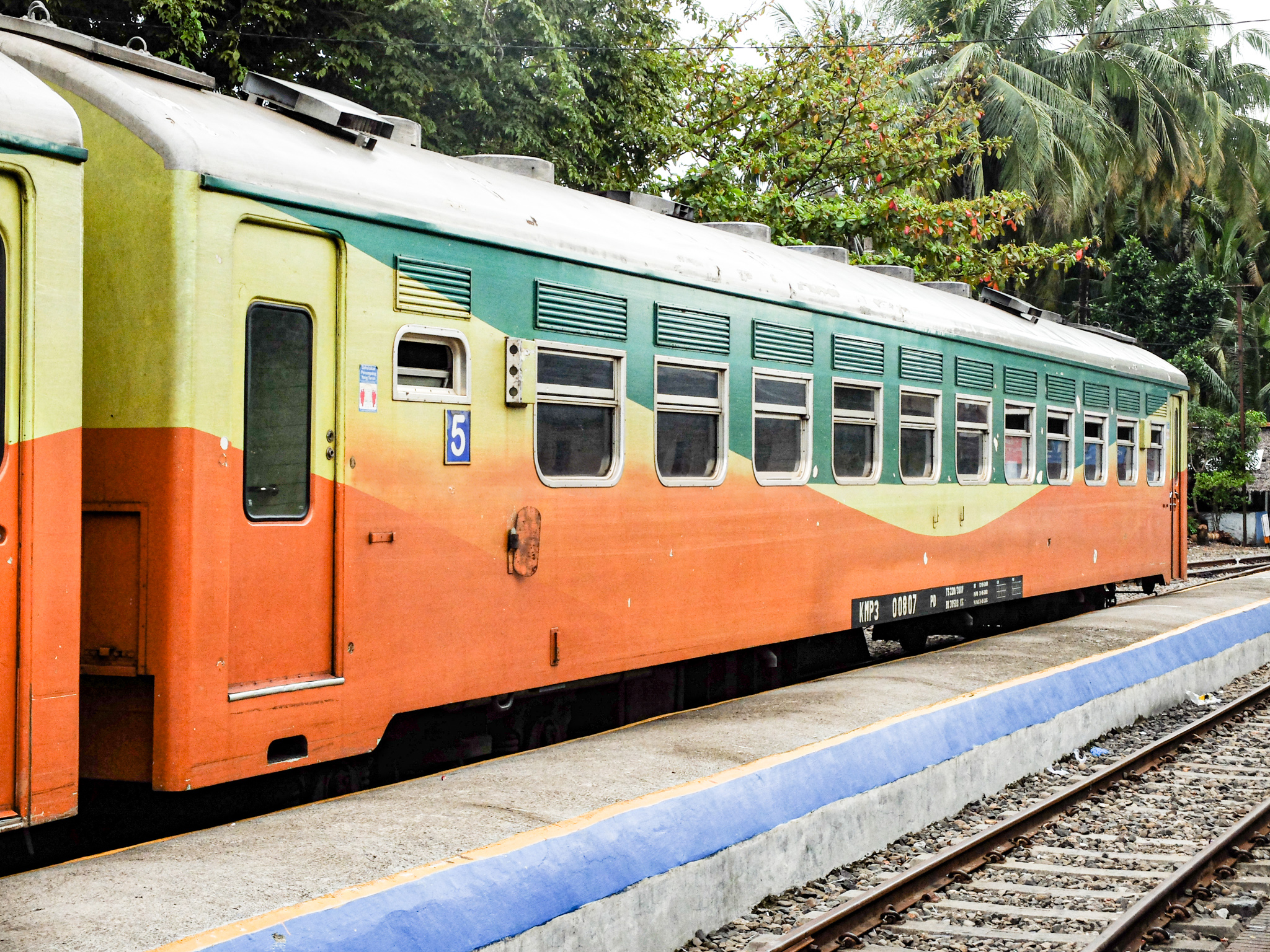
The exterior of the Sibinuang train (K3 08) when it is still using the original livery.

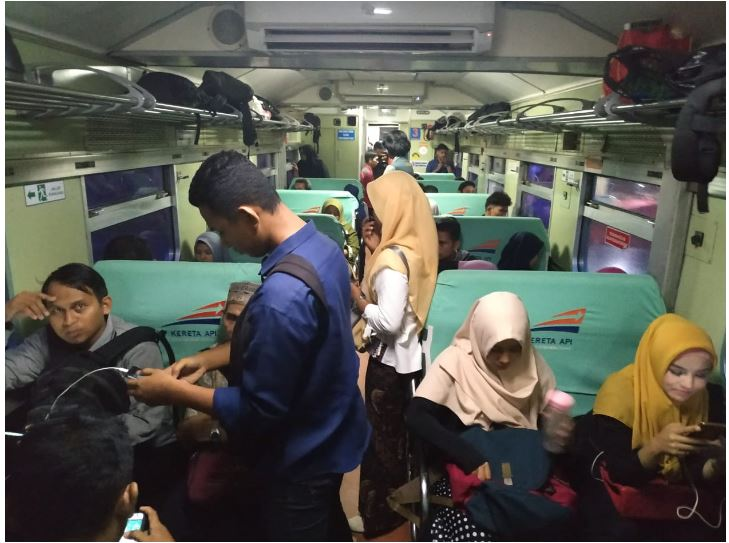
Seen on the Sibinuang train (K3 08) during peak hours. This train sells standing tickets and the economy train made in 2008 by INKA has 2-2 seats

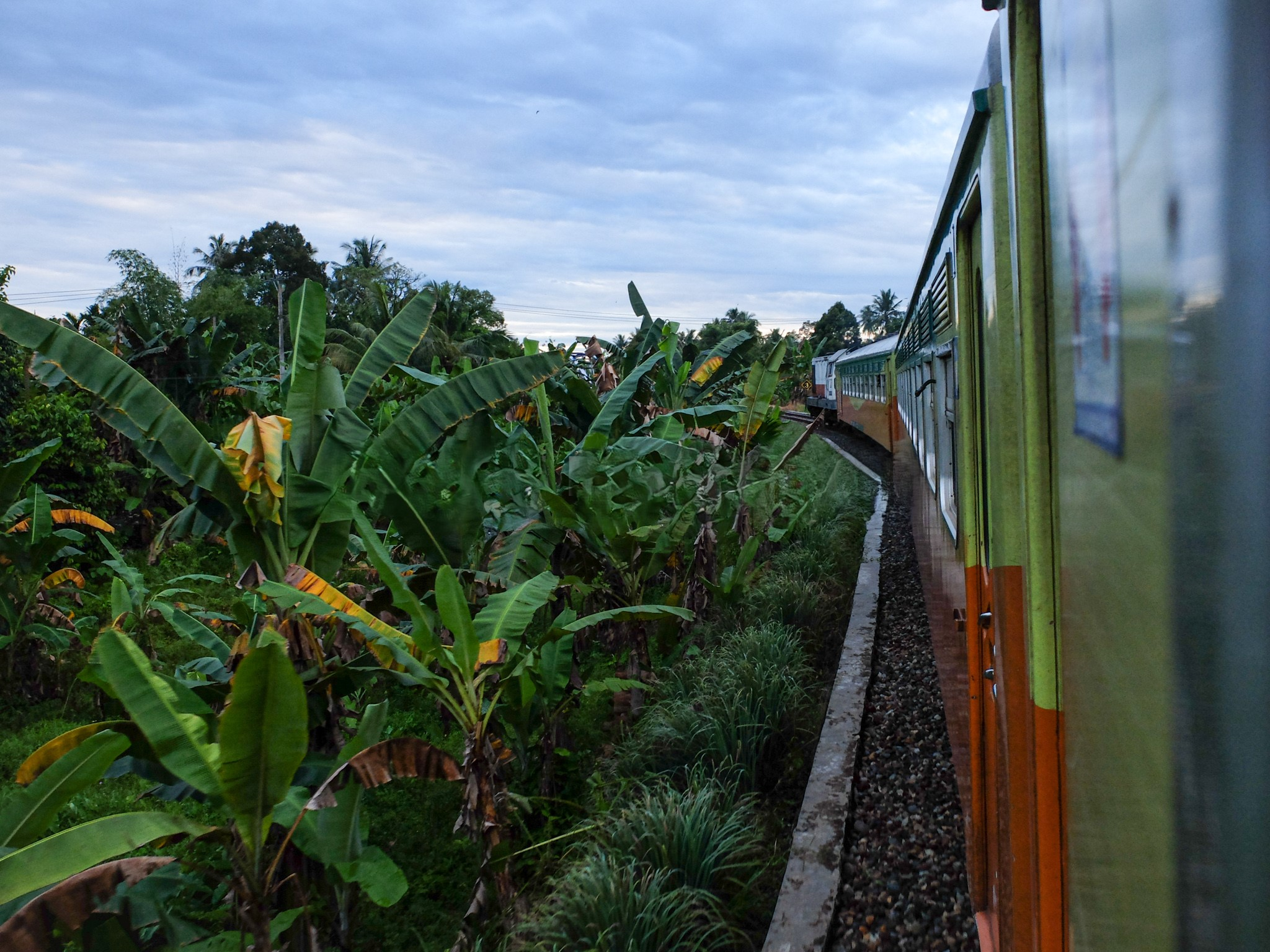
The Sibinuang train curves on the way from Padang to Pariaman

== See also ==
- Minangkabau Express
