= Indrajaya =

District in Aceh, Indonesia

- District
- Interactive map of Indrajaya
- Coordinates: 5.300000°N 95.933333°E
- Country: Indonesia
- Province: Aceh
- Regency: Pidie

Area
  - Total: 25.41 km^{2} (9.81 sq mi)

Population (2023)
  - Total: 24,033
  - Density: 945.8/km^{2} (2,450/sq mi)
- Time zone: UTC+7 (WIB)
- Postal Code: 24171

Indrajaya is an administrative district (kecamatan) in Pidie Regency, Aceh, Indonesia.
