= Langsa =

City in Aceh, Indonesia

- City
- City of Langsa; Kota Langsa

Other transcription(s)
  - Jawi: لڠسا
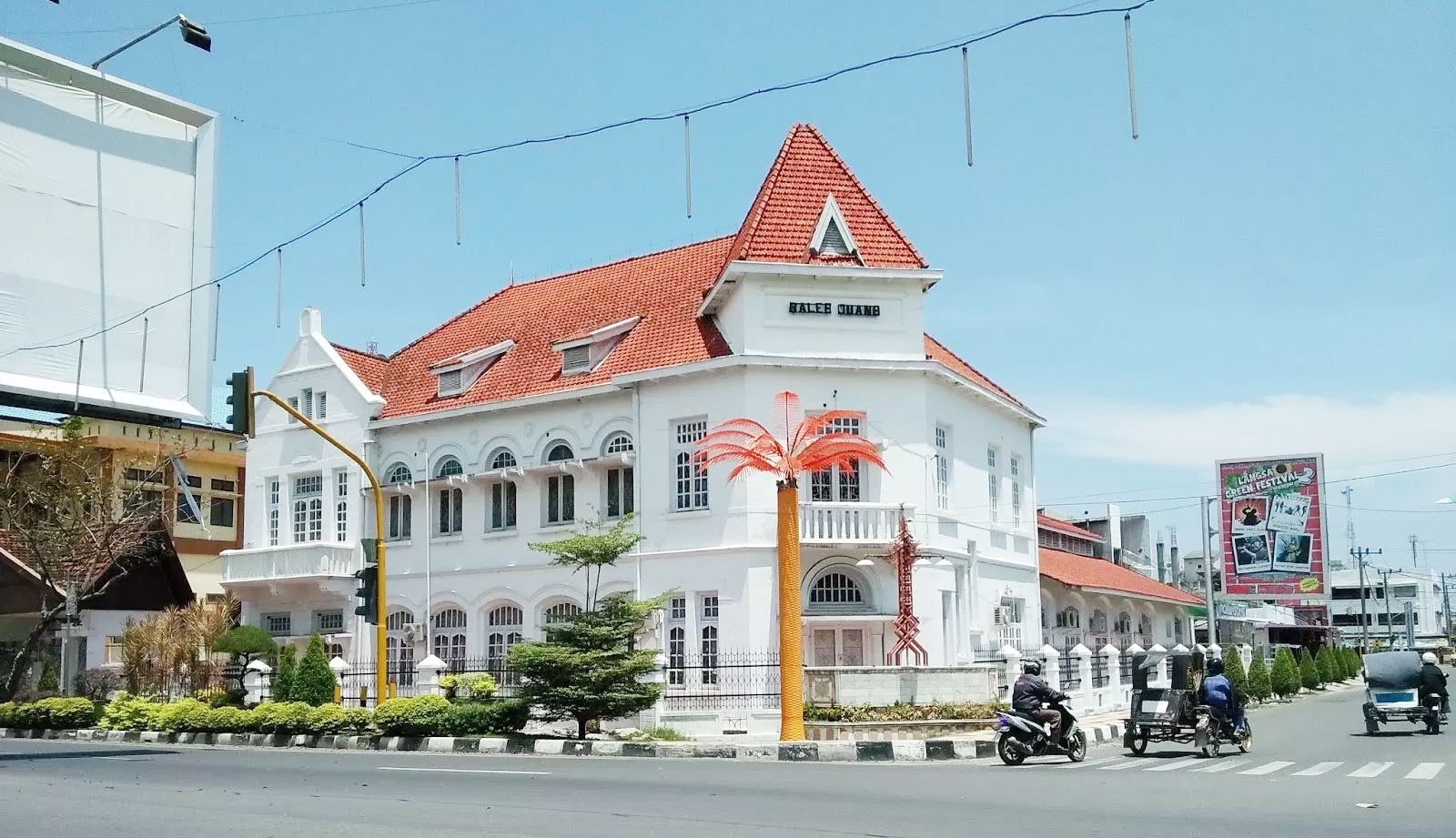
- Bale Juang Museum in Langsa

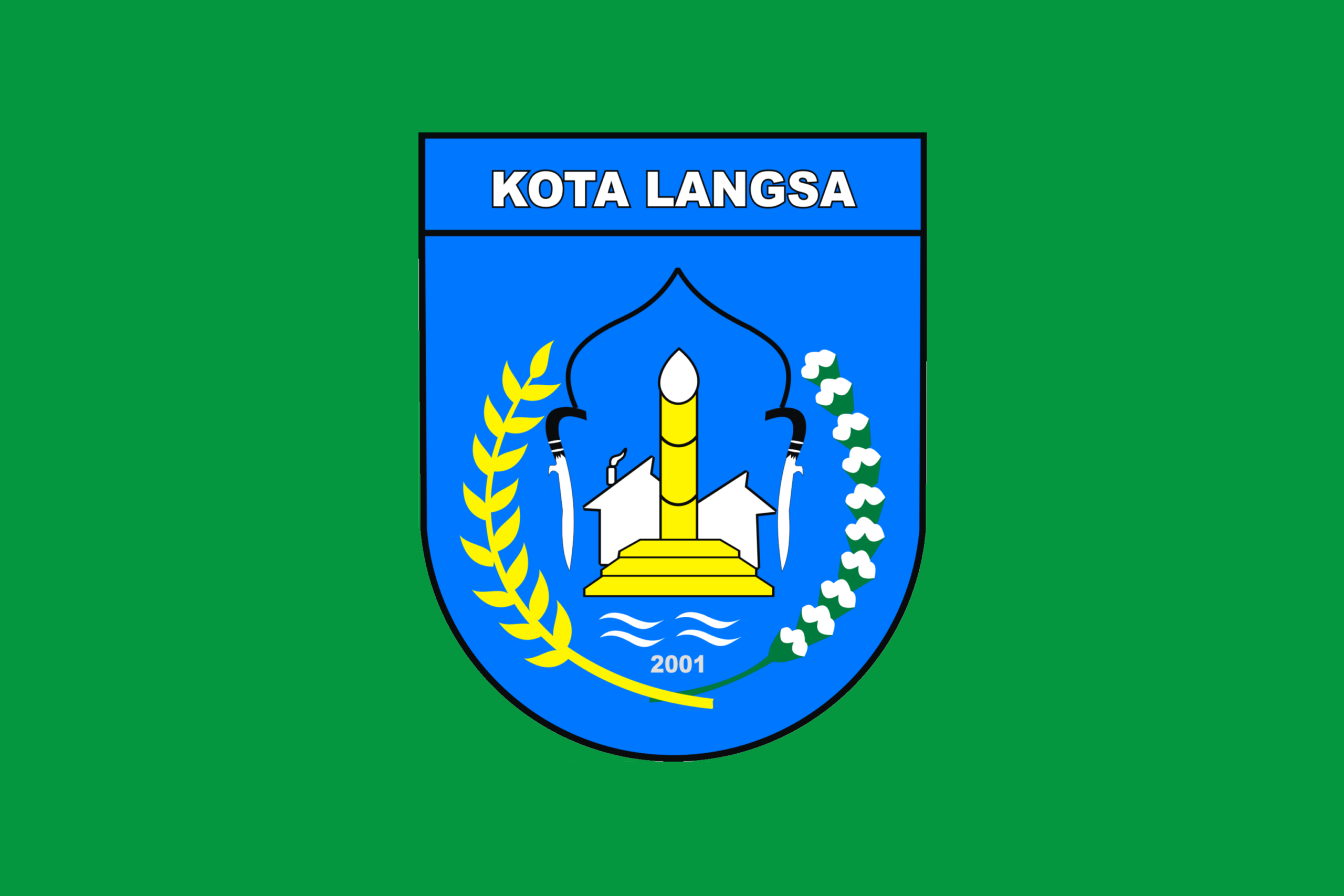
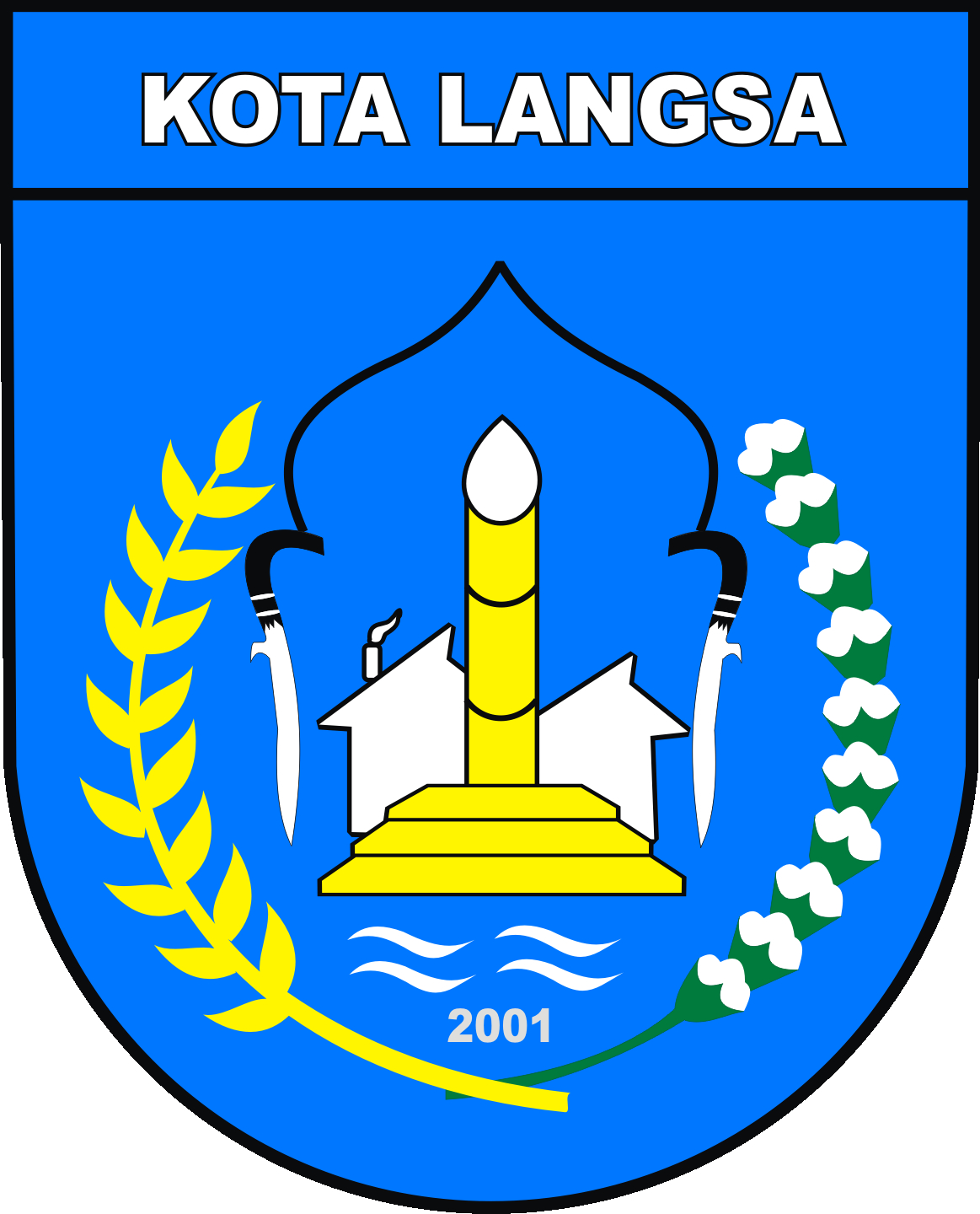
- Flag Coat of arms
- Motto(s): Indonesian: Terwujudnya Masyarakat yang Aman, Damai, Bermartabat, Maju, Sejahtera, dan Islami; English: Realization of a Safe Community, Peace, Dignity, Progress, Prosperity with islamic values
- Location within Aceh

- Location in Aceh, Northern Sumatra, Sumatra and Indonesia Langsa (Northern Sumatra) Langsa (Sumatra) Langsa (Indonesia)
- Coordinates: 4°28′48″N 97°57′48″E
- Country: Indonesia
- Province: Aceh
- City Established: 17 October 2001

Government
  - Mayor: Jeffry Sentana Putra
  - Vice Mayor: Muhammad Haikal Alfisyahrin

Area
  - Total: 239.83 km^{2} (92.60 sq mi)

Population (mid 2025 estimate)
  - Total: 184,016
  - Density: 767.28/km^{2} (1,987.2/sq mi)
- Time zone: UTC+7 (IWST)
- Area code: (+62) 641
- Website: langsakota.go.id

Langsa (Indonesian: Kota Langsa, Jawi: لڠسا), is a city in Aceh, Indonesia. It is located on the island of Sumatra. Apart from a small seacoast to the northeast, it borders Manyak Payed District of Aceh Tamiang Regency to the east and is otherwise surrounded by Birem Bayeun District of Aceh Timur Regency (of which the city was formerly a part until 2001) to the north, west and south. The city covers an area of 239.83 square kilometres and had a population of 148,945 at the 2010 Census (compared with 117,256 at the previous 2000 Census); this grew to 185,971 at the 2020 Census, and the official estimate as of mid 2025 was 184,016 (comprising 92,153 males and 91,863 females).

Langsa is located 440 kilometres (273 miles) from the city of Banda Aceh, the province's capital. Langsa is close to its province's southern border and is 167 kilometres (103 miles) from Medan, the capital city of North Sumatra. This makes Langsa a strategic city for trade and traffic between the two provinces.

There are several universities in the city of Langsa both state and private universities. Among them are Samudra University and IAIN Zawiyah Cot Kala, Campus LP3I. The city hosts several schools of nursing and midwifery, including the Academy of Nursing of "Harapan Ibu", the Academy of Nursing "Yayasan Cut Nyak Dhien" and the Academy of Nursing "UMMI".

== History ==
=== Darul Islam Rebellion ===
On 21 September 1953, Darul Islam forces invaded Langsa. They attacked Military Police and the Mobile Brigade barracks. The Indonesian National Armed Forces repelled this Darul Islam attack after receiving reinforcement troops from Medan.

== Tourism ==
Langsa contains historical attractions covering Indonesia's Dutch colonial era until Indonesia's National Revolution, which could attract tourism to the city.

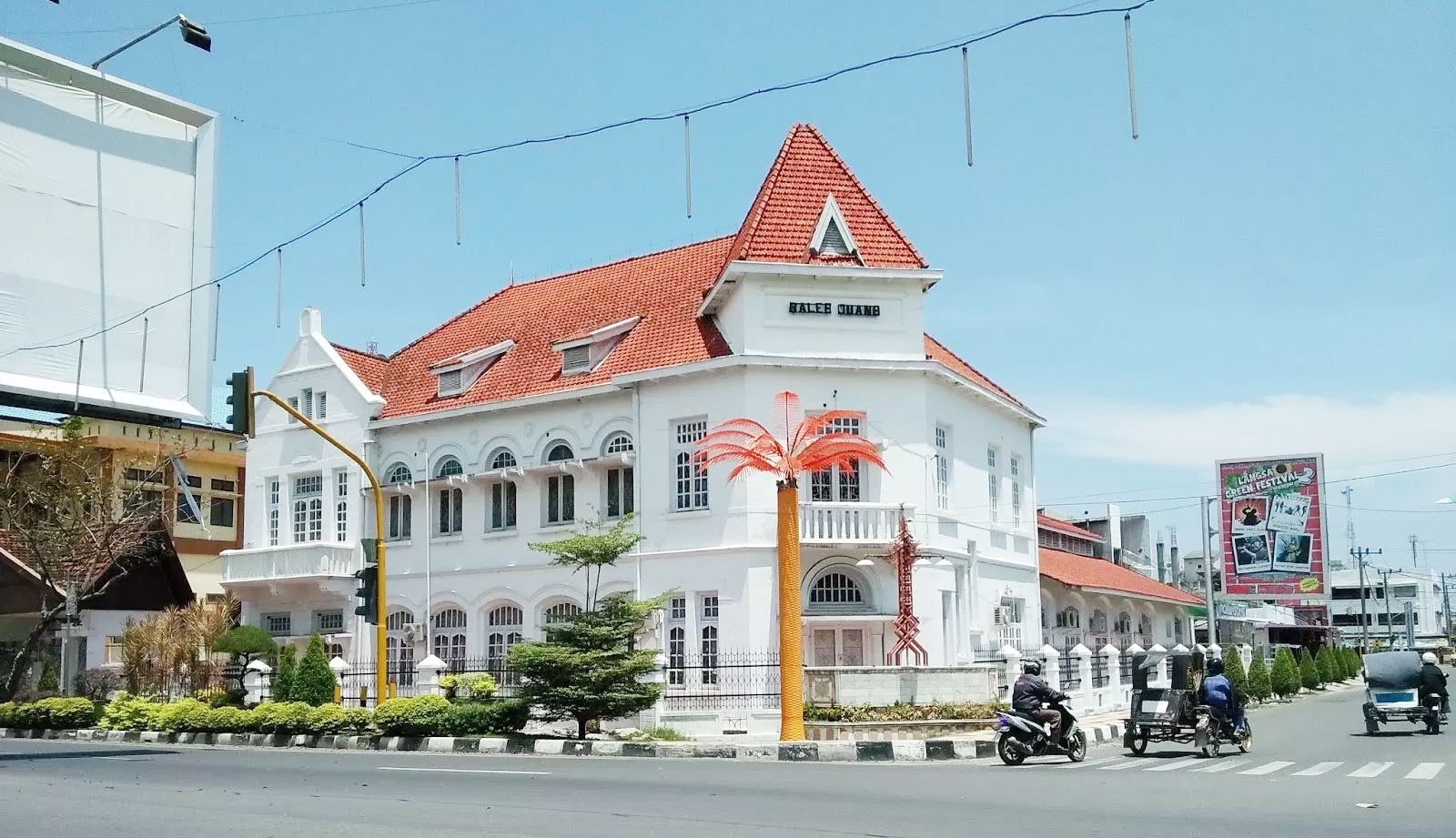
Balee Juang Building

- The Balee Juang Building built in 1910s, served as an office for export-import management for the Dutch, although afterwards the Japanese invasion of Dutch East Indies, it had been a military base office used by IJAF officials. During the Indonesian National Revolution, the Balee Juang Building was refurbished as a printing press facility to print out Bon Contan, a coupon used for a medium of exchange in the Aceh province during said time. In 2019 till now, it eventually now has been reestablished as the Balee Juang Museum of Langsa.

== Administrative districts ==
The city is divided into five districts (kecamatan), tabulated below with areas and their population at the 2010 and 2020 Censuses, together with the official estimates as of mid 2025. The table also includes the locations of the district administrative centres, the number of administrative villages in each village (urban gampong), and its postal codes.

Kode Wilayah	Name of District (kecamatan)	Area in km^{2}	Pop'n Census 2010	Pop'n Census 2020	Pop'n Estimate mid 2025	Admin centre	No. of villages	Post codes
11.74.01	Langsa Timur (East Langsa)	78.23	13,818	16,627	18,009	Seunebuk Antara	16	24411
11.74.04	Langsa Lama	45.05	26,877	33,231	33,941	Meurandeh	15	24411 & 24416
11.74.02	Langsa Barat (West Langsa)	48.78	30,583	39,553	38,230	Matang Seulimeng	13	24410, 24413, 24414 & 24415
11.74.05	Langsa Baro	61.68	41,804	55,824	56,958	Geudubang Aceh	12	24415
11.73.03	Langsa Kota (Langsa Town)	6.11	35,863	40,736	36,878	Gampong Teungoh	10	24410, 24412, 24414 & 24416
	Totals	239.83	148,945	185,971	184,016		66	

Note that, notwithstanding their names, the most westerly district of Langsa is Langsa Baro District, while Langsa Barat District is actually situated to the north of Lama Kota (Langsa Town), and Langsa Lama District lies to the south of Langsa Kota.

== Climate ==
Langsa has a tropical rainforest climate (Af) with moderate rainfall from February to April and heavy rainfall in the remaining months.

Climate data for Langsa
Month	Jan	Feb	Mar	Apr	May	Jun	Jul	Aug	Sep	Oct	Nov	Dec	Year
Mean daily maximum °C (°F)	31.0 (87.8)	32.0 (89.6)	32.4 (90.3)	32.5 (90.5)	32.5 (90.5)	32.4 (90.3)	32.1 (89.8)	32.0 (89.6)	31.3 (88.3)	31.1 (88.0)	30.6 (87.1)	30.7 (87.3)	31.7 (89.1)
Daily mean °C (°F)	26.6 (79.9)	27.1 (80.8)	27.4 (81.3)	27.7 (81.9)	27.8 (82.0)	27.6 (81.7)	27.2 (81.0)	27.2 (81.0)	26.9 (80.4)	26.9 (80.4)	26.5 (79.7)	26.6 (79.9)	27.1 (80.8)
Mean daily minimum °C (°F)	22.2 (72.0)	22.2 (72.0)	22.4 (72.3)	23.0 (73.4)	23.1 (73.6)	22.8 (73.0)	22.3 (72.1)	22.4 (72.3)	22.6 (72.7)	22.8 (73.0)	22.5 (72.5)	22.5 (72.5)	22.6 (72.6)
Average rainfall mm (inches)	149 (5.9)	83 (3.3)	85 (3.3)	94 (3.7)	179 (7.0)	140 (5.5)	160 (6.3)	200 (7.9)	233 (9.2)	242 (9.5)	237 (9.3)	275 (10.8)	2,077 (81.7)
Source: Climate-Data.org

== Population ==
Acehnese speakers.

Langsa's population is mainly made up of people of Acehnese, Malay, Javanese, Chinese, and Batak ethnicities. Acehnese is the main language used by people who consider themselves as of Acehnese ethnicity, but the Indonesian language is the official language.

Islam is the religion of the majority in Aceh, including Langsa, but other religions exist, such as Christianity and Buddhism. Buddhism is common among Langsa's ethnically Chinese population.

== People from Langsa ==
- Jessica Mila
- Kivlan Zen
- Jusman Syafii Djamal
- Johannes Antonius Franciscus Roelen
- Peter Kuiper
- Jalwandi Jamal
