= Pidie Jaya Regency =

Regency in Aceh, Indonesia

Pidie Jaya Regency Kabupaten Pidie Jaya
- Regency
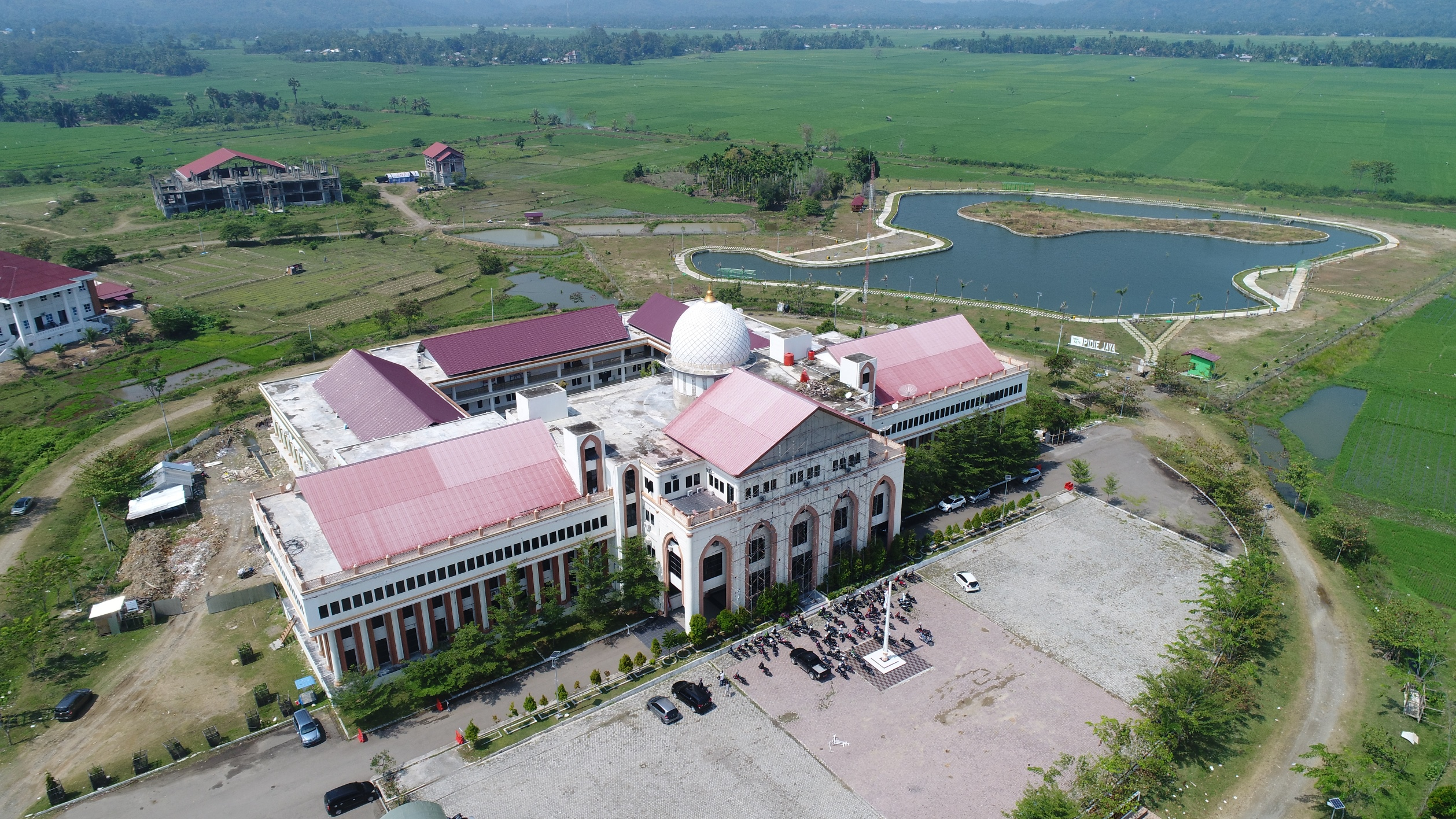
- Regent office of Pidie Jaya in Meureudu

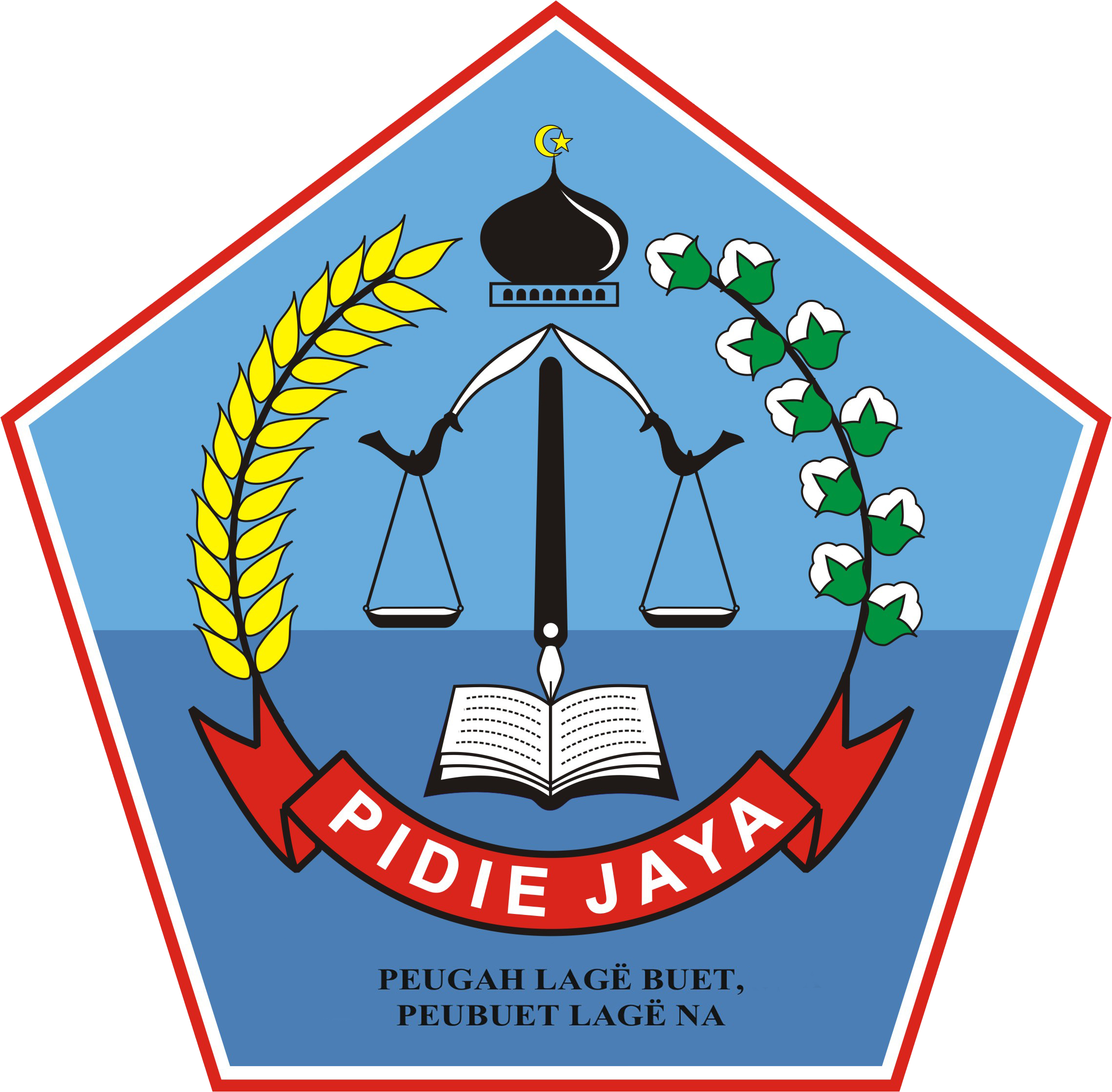
- Seal
- Motto: Peugah Lagë Buet, Peubuet Lagë Na (Say What you Do, Do What you Say)
- Location within Aceh

- Location in Aceh, Northern Sumatra, Sumatra and Indonesia Pidie Jaya Regency (Northern Sumatra) Pidie Jaya Regency (Sumatra) Pidie Jaya Regency (Indonesia)
- Coordinates: 5°07′N 96°12′E
- Country: Indonesia
- Region: Sumatra
- Province: Aceh
- Established: 2007
- Regency seat: Meureudu

Government
  - Regent: Sibral Malasyi
  - Vice Regent: Hasan Basri

Area
  - Total: 952.12 km^{2} (367.62 sq mi)

Population (mid 2025 estimate)
  - Total: 167,354
  - Density: 175.77/km^{2} (455.24/sq mi)
- Time zone: UTC+7 (IWST)
- Area code: (+62) 653
- Website: pidiejayakab.go.id

Pidie Jaya Regency (Indonesian: Kabupaten Pidie Jaya) is a regency in the Aceh Province of Indonesia, located on the island of Sumatra. The regency was created out of the former northeastern districts of Pidie Regency on 2 January 2007. The seat of the regency government is at the town of Meureudu. The regency covers an area of 952.12 square kilometres and had a population of 132,956 people at the 2010 Census and 158,397 at the 2020 Census; the official estimate as of mid 2025 was 167,354 (comprising 84,135 males and 87,971 females^{(a)}).

== Administrative divisions ==
The regency is divided administratively into eight districts (kecamatan), listed below with their areas and their populations at the 2010 Census and the 2020 Census, together with the official estimates as of mid 2025. The table also includes the locations of the district administrative centres, the number of district divisions (mukim) and administrative villages (gampong) in each district, and its post code.

Kode Wilayah	Name of District (kecamatan)	Area in km^{2}	Pop'n Census 2010	Pop'n Census 2020	Pop'n Estimate mid 2025	Admin centre	No. of mukim	No. of gampong	Post code
11.18.01	Meureudu	124.79	18,387	22,226	23,633	Kota Meureudu	7	30	24186
11.18.05	Meurah Dua	287.07	10,090	12,507	13,271	Meunasah Bie	3	19	24186
11.18.04	Bandar Dua	174.32	23,656	28,060	29,452	Ulee Gle	5	45	24188
11.18.03	Jangka Buya	9.35	8,714	10,174	11,125	Keude Jangka Buya	2	18	24186
11.18.02	Ulim	41.75	13,338	16,242	17,178	Keude Ulim	5	30	24187
11.18.08	Trienggadeng	79.37	19,901	23,509	24,805	Keude Trienggadeng	5	27	24185
11.18.07	Panteraja	15.00	7,533	8,968	9,463	Keude Panteraja	2	10	24185
11.18.06	Bandar Baru	220.47	31,337	36,711	38,427	Keude Leung Putu	8	43	24184
	Totals	952.12	132,956	158,397	167,354	Kota Meureudu	37	222	

== See also ==
- List of regencies and cities of Indonesia
