= Langsa Timur, Langsa =

District in Langsa, Indonesia

Coordinates: 4.466490130301425°N 98.01707172000364°E

Langsa Timur is a district located in the eastern area of Langsa, Aceh, Indonesia. It has one subdistrict (mukim) consisting of 16 villages:

- Alue Merbau
- Alue Pineueng
- Alue Pineueng Timue
- Buket Meutuah
- Buket Pulo
- Buket Rata
- Cinta Raja
- Gampong Baro
- Kapa (village)
- Matang Ceungai
- Matang Panyang
- Matang Seutui
- Meudang Ara
- Seuneubok Antara
- Sukarejo
- Sungai Lueng
