= Bambel =

- District
- Interactive map of Bambel
- Location within Aceh Location within Sumatra Location within Indonesia
- Coordinates: 3°26′20.2″N 97°52′20.6″E
- Country: Indonesia
- Region: Sumatra
- Province: Aceh
- Regency: Southeast Aceh
- District seat: Kuta Lang Lang

Area
  - Total: 23.30 km^{2} (9.00 sq mi)

Population (2023)
  - Total: 20,982
  - Density: 900.5/km^{2} (2,332/sq mi)
- Time zone: UTC+7 (WIB)
- Villages: 33

Bambel is a district in Southeast Aceh Regency, Aceh, Indonesia. In 2023, this district had a population of 20,982 people with an area of 23.30 km^{2}.

== Governance ==
=== Villages ===
Administratively, Bambel District consists of 33 villages (kute), namely:

Regional code	Name	Population (2023)	Hamlets (dusun)
11.02.03.2001	Bambel Gabungan	1115	4
11.02.03.2002	Kisam	-	-
11.02.03.2005	Lawe Hijo	720	3
11.02.03.2006	Pinding	950	5
11.02.03.2009	Terutung Megara Asli	993	4
11.02.03.2011	Biak Muli	1033	4
11.02.03.2012	Kute Lang-Lang	620	3
11.02.03.2013	Pedesi	628	3
11.02.03.2014	Terutung Payung Hulu	626	3
11.02.03.2015	Terutung Payung Hilir	535	3
11.02.03.2016	Tualang Sembilar	779	4
11.02.03.2017	Kuning I	1464	4
11.02.03.2018	Kuning II	570	4
11.02.03.2019	Cinta Damai	802	4
11.02.03.2020	Likat	661	3
11.02.03.2021	Rikit	588	3
11.02.03.2023	Bambel	1026	4
11.02.03.2025	Lawe Kihing	856	3
11.02.03.2026	Terutung Seperai	637	3
11.02.03.2027	Kute Seri	739	3
11.02.03.2028	Kuta Antara	439	3
11.02.03.2029	Pulo Perengge	307	3
11.02.03.2031	Pulo Kendondong	881	4
11.02.03.2033	Pancar Iman	332	3
11.02.03.2034	Biak Muli Baru	682	3
11.02.03.2035	Biak Muli Pantai Raja	406	3
11.02.03.2036	Biak Muli Sejahtera	272	3
11.02.03.2037	Lembah Haji	306	3
11.02.03.2038	Terutung Payung Gabungan	475	3
11.02.03.2039	Lawe Hijo Metuah	455	3
11.02.03.2040	Lawe Hijo Ampera	347	3
11.02.03.2041	Tembilakh Mbakhu	275	3
11.02.03.2042	Kute Lang-Lang Bakhu	299	3
11.02.03	Total	20,982	109
