= Blangpidie =

Blangpidie Blang Pidie
- District
- Location in Sumatra
- Coordinates: 3°45′N 96°51′E
- Country: Indonesia
- Province: Aceh
- Regency: Southwest Aceh Regency
- Island: Sumatra

Area
  - Total: 486.95 km^{2} (188.01 sq mi)

Population (mid 2024 estimate)
  - Total: 23,980
  - Density: 49.25/km^{2} (127.5/sq mi)
- Time zone: UTC+7 (WIB)
- Postal code: 23764

Blangpidie or Blang Pidie is a town in the Aceh province of Indonesia and the capital of Southwest Aceh Regency. Blangpidie is located on the west coast of Sumatra island and the main Banda Aceh — Medan road passes through the town.

== Demography ==
The population of Blangpidie District at the 2020 Census was 23,810 persons. The official mid-2024 population estimate was 23,980.

== Transportation ==
The city is served by the Blangpidie Airport (IATA: KJX).
