= Dewantara, North Aceh Regency =

Dewantara is a district in North Aceh Regency, Aceh, Indonesia. The capital of this district is Krueng Geukuh. There are a few companies in this district, such as PT.Arun, PT.Pupuk Iskandar Muda, and PT.AAF.

Dewantara has 15 villages, namely:

- Bangka Jaya
- Bluka Teubai
- Geulumpang Sulu Barat
- Geulumpang Sulu Timur
- Keude Krueng Geukeuh
- Lancang Barat
- Paloh Gadeng
- Paloh Igeuh
- Paloh Lada
- Pulo Rungkom
- Tambon Baroh
- Tambon Tunong
- Ulee Pulo
- Ulee Reuleung
- Uteun Geulinggang
