= Southwest Aceh Regency =

Regency in Aceh, Indonesia

Southwest Aceh Regency Kabupaten Aceh Barat Daya
- Regency
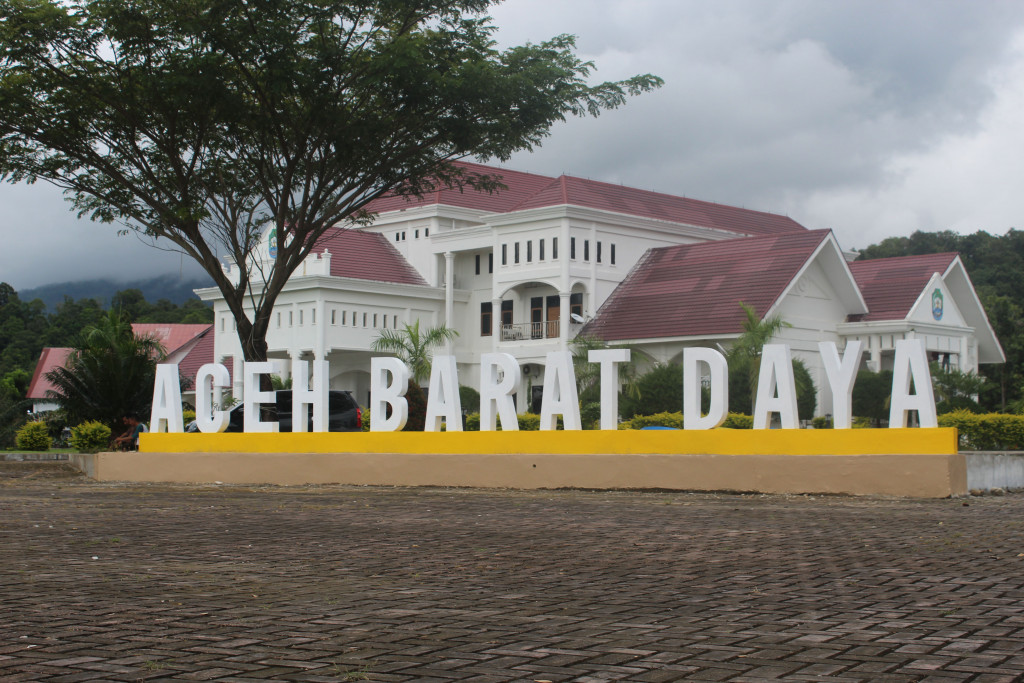
- Regent office of Southwest Aceh in Blangpidie

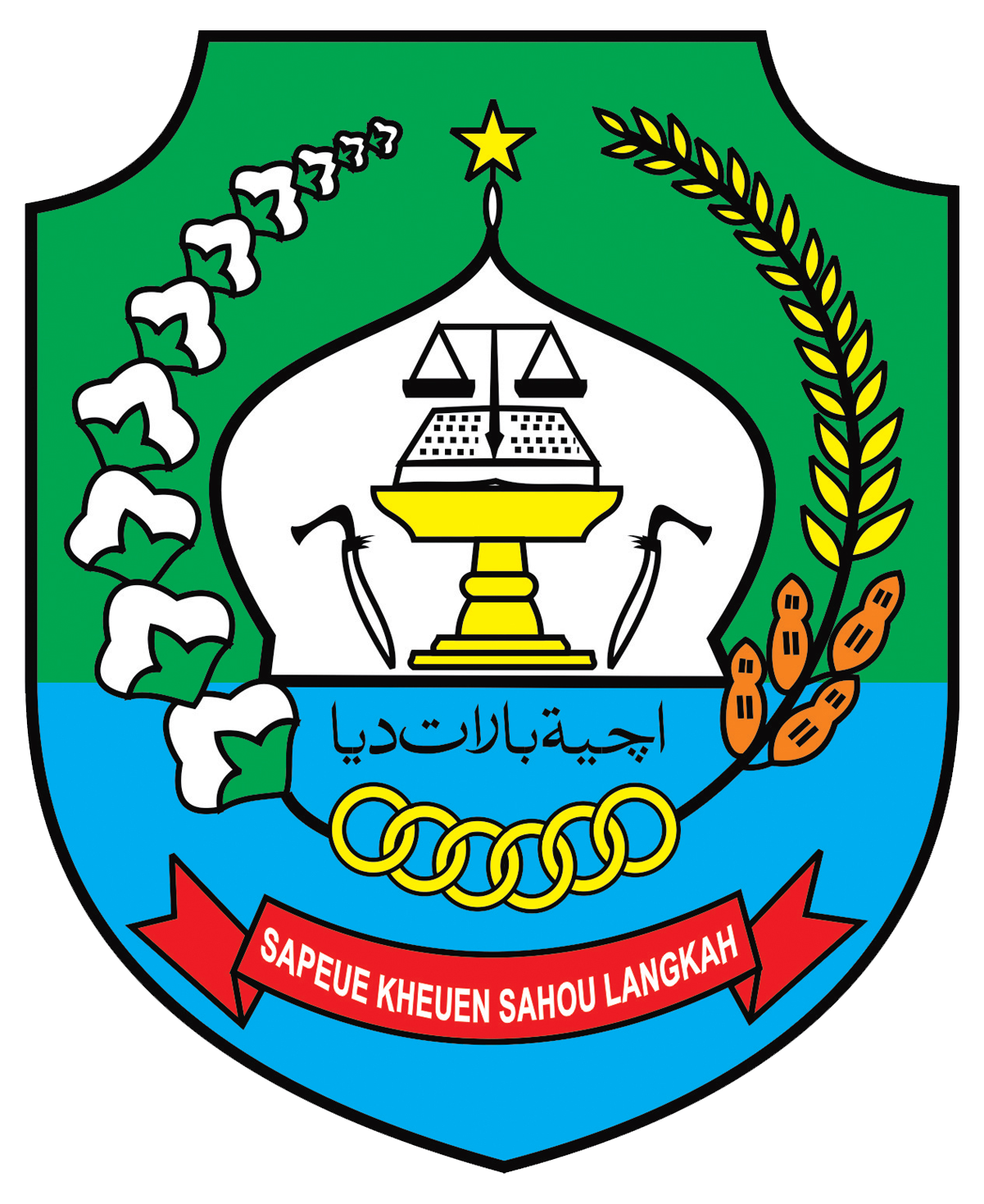
- Coat of arms
- Motto: Sapeu Kheun Sahoe Langkah (Same Word Same Step)
- Location within Aceh

- Location in Aceh, Northern Sumatra, Sumatra and Indonesia Southwest Aceh Regency (Northern Sumatra) Southwest Aceh Regency (Sumatra) Southwest Aceh Regency (Indonesia)
- Coordinates: 3.7911°N 96.9166°E
- Country: Indonesia
- Region: Sumatra
- Province: Aceh
- Established: 2002
- Regency seat: Blangpidie

Government
  - Regent: Safaruddin
  - Vice Regent: Zaman Akli

Area
  - Total: 1,882.99 km^{2} (727.03 sq mi)

Population (mid 2025 estimate)
  - Total: 156,737
  - Density: 83.2384/km^{2} (215.586/sq mi)
- Time zone: UTC+7 (IWST)
- Area code: (+62) 659
- Website: acehbaratdayakab.go.id

Southwest Aceh Regency (Indonesian: Kabupaten Aceh Barat Daya) is a regency in the Aceh Province of Indonesia. The regency was created on 10 April 2002 from the northwestern districts of South Aceh Regency. It is located on the west side of the island of Sumatra. The regency covers an area of 1,882.99 square kilometres and according to the 2010 census had a population of 126,036; this rose to 140,366 at the 2015 Census, and to 150,775 at the 2020 Census; the official estimate as of mid 2025 was 156,737. The seat of the regency government is the town of Blangpidie.

== Administrative districts ==
The regency is divided administratively into nine districts (kecamatan), tabulated below with their areas (in km^{2}) and their populations at the 2010 Census and the 2020 Census, together with the official estimates as of mid 2025. The table also includes the locations of the district administrative centres, the number of villages (gampong) in each district, and its postal codes.

Kode Wilayah	Name of District (kecamatan)	Area in km^{2}	Pop'n Census 2010	Pop'n Census 2020	Pop'n Estimate mid 2025	Admin centre	No. of villages	Post codes
11.12.03	Manggeng	100.68	12,670	15,331	15,688	Kedai Manggeng	18	23760
11.12.09	Lembah Sabil	110.23	9,771	11,121	11,372	Cot Bak U	14	23762
11.12.02	Tangan-Tangan	63.60	11,509	13,704	14,173	Tanjung Bunga	15	23768
11.12.07	Setia	30.21	7,461	8,673	8,987	Lhang	9	23763
11.12.01	Blangpidie	486.95	20,084	23,810	24,319	Pasar Blangpidie	20	23764
11.12.08	Jeumpa	225.78	9,481	11,338	11,718	Alue Sungai Pinang	12	23769
11.12.04	Susoh	18.71	20,901	24,619	25,486	Padang Baru	29	23765
11.12.05	Kuala Batee	287.32	17,740	21,383	22,651	Pasar Kota Bahagia	21	23766
11.12.06	Babahrot	559.52	16,419	20,796	22,343	Pante Rakyat	14	23767
	Totals	1,882.99	126,036	150,775	156,737	Blangpidie	152	

== See also ==
- List of regencies and cities of Indonesia
