= Bireuën Regency =

Regency in Aceh, Indonesia

Bireuën Regency Kabupaten Bireuën
- Regency
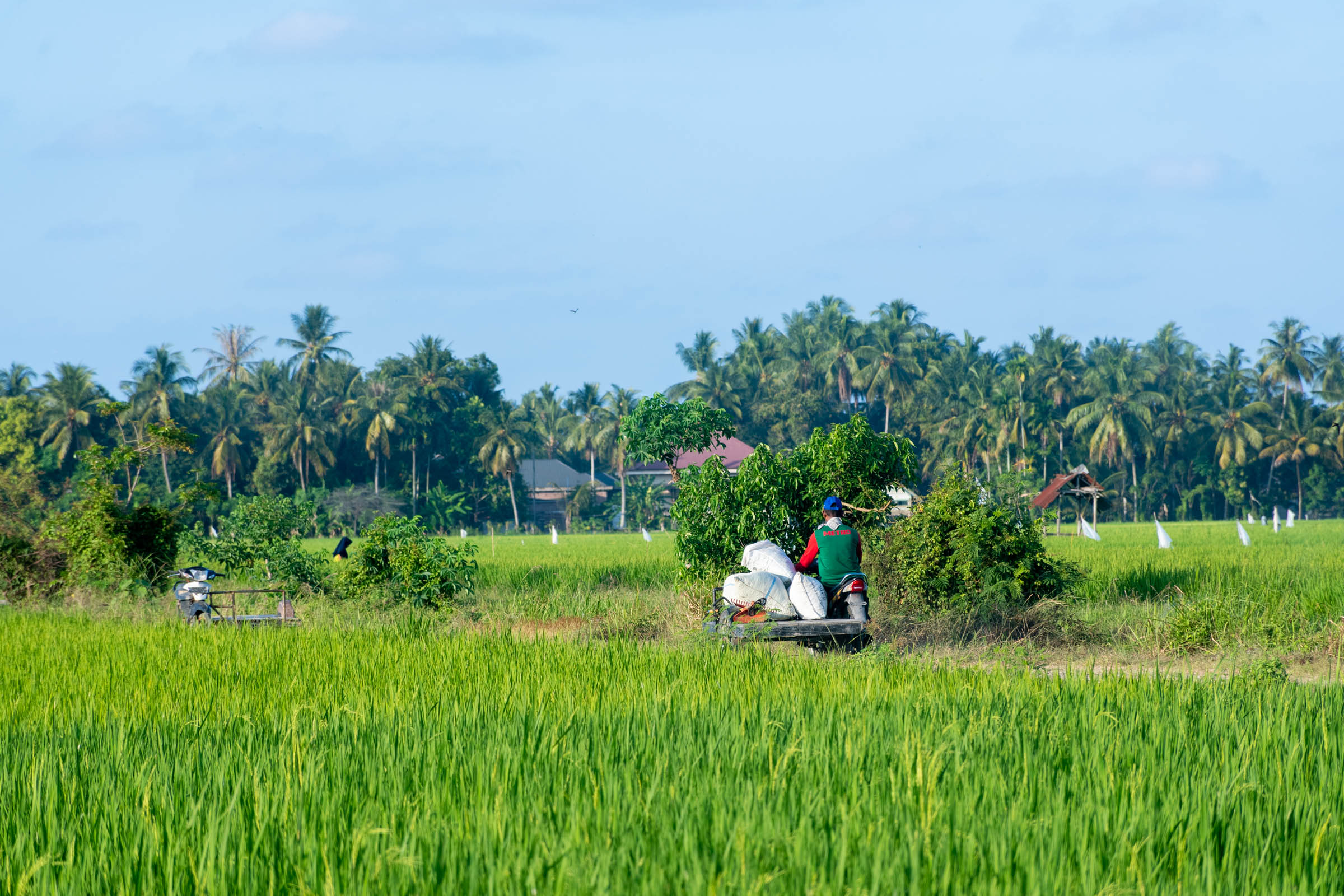
- Paddy fields in Bireuen

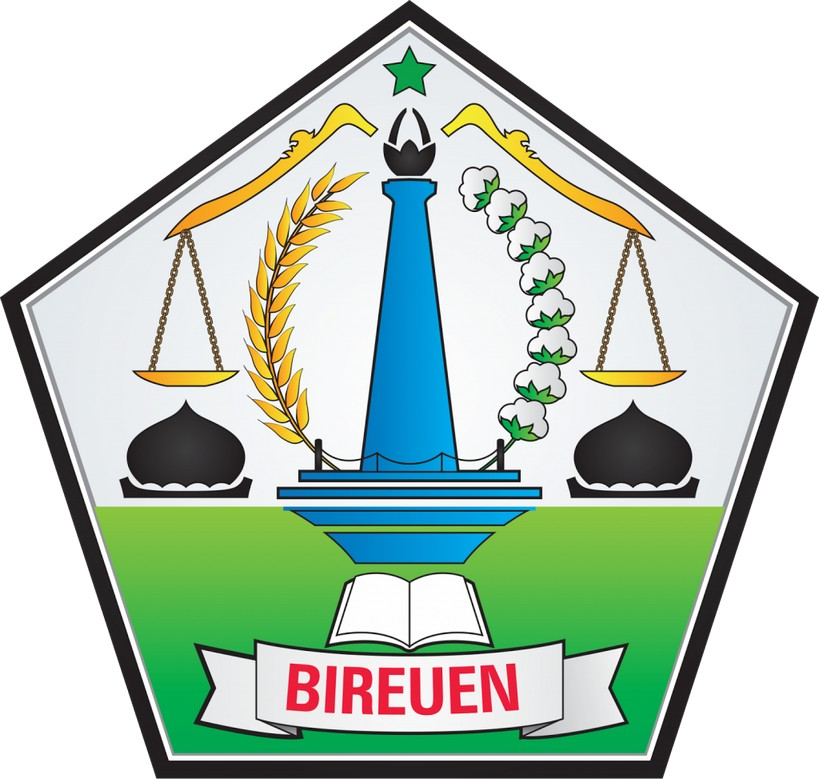
- Seal

- Location within Aceh

- Location in Aceh, Northern Sumatra, Sumatra and Indonesia Bireuën Regency (Northern Sumatra) Bireuën Regency (Sumatra) Bireuën Regency (Indonesia)
- Coordinates: 5°5′N 96°36′E
- Country: Indonesia
- Region: Sumatra
- Province: Aceh
- Established: 1999
- Regency seat: Bireuën

Government
  - Regent: Mukhlis
  - Vice Regent: Razuardi Ibrahim

Area
  - Total: 1,796.97 km^{2} (693.81 sq mi)

Population (mid 2025 estimate)
  - Total: 464,776
  - Density: 258.644/km^{2} (669.886/sq mi)
- Time zone: UTC+7 (IWST)
- Area code: (+62) 644
- Website: bireunkab.go.id

Bireuën Regency (Indonesian: Kabupaten Bireuen, Acehnese pronunciation: [bi.rɯ.ən]) is a regency of Aceh, the westernmost province of Indonesia. It is located on the island of Sumatra, and was created on 4 October 1999 from the former western districts of North Aceh Regency. The capital is the town of Bireuën, 105 miles east of the provincial capital, Banda Aceh. The regency covers an area of 1,796.97 square kilometres and had a population of 340,271 people according to the 2000 Census; at the 2010 Census it had a population of 389,288, which had risen to 436,418 at the 2020 Census; the official estimate as of mid 2025 was 464,776 (comprising 230,093 males and 234,683 females). It is bordered by the Strait of Malacca on the northeast coastline. Bireuen has been affected by the clashes between the Free Aceh Movement (GAM) and the government, and by the Indian Ocean earthquake and tsunami on 26 December 2004.

The regency's name is commonly spelled without the diaeresis on the ⟨ë⟩: Kabupaten Bireuen (in Acehnese, ⟨ë⟩ represents a schwa ([ə]) in diphthongs).

== Administrative districts ==
The regency is divided administratively into seventeen districts (kecamatan), tabulated below with their areas and their populations at the 2010 Census and the 2020 Census, together with the official estimates as of mid 2025. The table also includes the locations of the district administrative centres, the number of district divisions (kemukimam) and villages (gampong) in each district, and its post code.

| Kode Wilayah | Name of District (kecamatan) | Area in km^{2} | Pop'n Census 2010 | Pop'n Census 2020 | Pop'n Estimate mid 2025 | Admin centre | No. of mukim | No. of gampong | Post code |
|---|---|---|---|---|---|---|---|---|---|
| 11.11.01 | Samalanga | 141.33 | 27,209 | 27,907 | 28,462 | Samalanga | 5 | 46 | 24264 |
| 11.11.11 | Simpang Mamplam | 157.81 | 24,470 | 27,237 | 28,893 | Simpang Mamplam | 3 | 41 | 24253 |
| 11.11.08 | Pandrah | 113.93 | 7,669 | 8,806 | 9,483 | Pandrah Kandeh | 3 | 19 | 24265 |
| 11.11.02 | Jeunieb | 112.49 | 22,309 | 25,244 | 26,994 | Jeunieb | 6 | 43 | 24263 |
| 11.11.12 | Peulimbang | 118.32 | 10,243 | 12,085 | 13,186 | Peulimbang | 3 | 22 | 24266 |
| 11.11.03 | Peudada | 319.60 | 23,996 | 27,839 | 30,130 | Peudada | 6 | 52 | 24262 |
| | Subtotals; Western half | 963.48 | 115,896 | 129,118 | 137,148 | | 26 | 223 | |
| 11.11.09 | Juli | 231.09 | 28,738 | 33,731 | 36,713 | Beunyot | 4 | 36 | 24250 |
| 11.11.04 | Jeumpa | 108.99 | 32,189 | 36,930 | 39,754 | Blang Bladeh | 5 | 42 | 24251 |
| 11.11.13 | Kota Juang (Bireuën town) | 16.90 | 44,604 | 47,670 | 49,584 | Bandar Bireuën | 4 | 23 | 24252 |
| 11.11.14 | Kuala | 17.08 | 16,169 | 18,731 | 20,258 | Cot Batee | 4 | 20 | 24260 |
| 11.11.10 | Jangka | 37.71 | 25,698 | 28,687 | 30,474 | Jangka | 5 | 46 | 24261 |
| 11.11.05 | Peusangan | 59.03 | 47,494 | 52,716 | 55,847 | Matang Glumpang Dua | 9 | 69 | 24267 |
| 11.11.16 | Peusangan Selatan (South Peusangan) | 94.09 | 13,080 | 14,889 | 15,967 | Geulanggang Labu | 3 | 21 | 24268 |
| 11.11.15 | Peusangan Siblah Krueng | 111.20 | 10,447 | 11,956 | 12,855 | Lueng Daneuen | 3 | 21 | 24269 |
| 11.11.06 | Makmur | 71.69 | 13,887 | 15,656 | 16,711 | Ulee Gle | 4 | 27 | 24357 |
| 11.11.07 | Ganda Pura | 38.68 | 20,881 | 23,732 | 25,431 | Geurugok | 4 | 40 | 24356 |
| 11.11.17 | Kuta Blang | 47.04 | 20,205 | 22,602 | 24,034 | Kuta Blang | 4 | 41 | 24358 |
| | Subtotals; Eastern half | 833.49 | 273,392 | 307,300 | 327,628 | | 49 | 386 | |
| | Totals | 1,796.97 | 389,288 | 436,418 | 464,776 | Bandar Bireuën | 75 | 609 | |
