= Teuku Nyak Arif =

Indonesian politician

- Artist's depiction

Chief of Sagi XXVII Mukim
- In office 1911–1946
- Preceded by: Teuku Nyak Banta

Member of the People's Council of Aceh
- In office 1927–1931

Member of the People's Representative Council of Aceh
- In office 1942–1945

Member of the People's Representative Council of Sumatra
- In office 1943–1945

1st Governor of Aceh
- In office 3 October 1945 – 4 May 1946
- Preceded by: Post created
- Succeeded by: Teuku Daud Syah

Personal details
- Born: 17 July 1899 Ulèë Lheuë, Koetaradja, Dutch East Indies
- Died: 4 May 1946 (aged 46) Takengon, Aceh, Indonesia
- Resting place: Lam Nyong family cemetery
- Spouse: Tjut Nyak Jauhari (divorced)
- Children: 3
- Nickname: Rencong of Aceh

Military service
- Rank: Major General (titular)

Teuku Nyak Arif (17 July 1899 – 4 May 1946) was an Acehnese nationalist and National Hero of Indonesia. He has been given the nickname Rencong of Aceh, after the traditional Acehnese weapon, for his bravery.

== Biography ==
=== Early life ===
Nyak Arif was born in Ulèë Lheuë, Banda Aceh, Aceh, on 17 July 1899. He was the third of five siblings born to Chief of Sagi XXVII Mukim Teuku Nyak Banta and Cut Nyak Rayeuh; he also had five siblings from his father's two other wives. After graduating from elementary school in Banda Aceh, he moved to Bukittinggi, West Sumatra, to study at the teacher's college (kweekschool) there. In 1911 he was chosen as the new leader of Sagi XXVI Mukim, but due to his age Nyak Arif was represented by his father.

Upon finishing his studies in Bukittinggi, Nyak Arif went to the leadership school for native Indonesians (Opleiding School Voor Inlandsche Ambtenaren) in Banten on the island of Java. While at school, he demonstrated a dislike of the Dutch colonial government and their programs, at times disobeying commands from his teachers and refusing to take the f 10 allowance allocated to every Acehnese student outside of Aceh. After graduating in 1915, he returned to Aceh.

=== Entry to politics ===
Nyak Arif became active in politics beginning in 1919, when he joined the Nationaal Indische Party, a continuation of the original Indische Party founded by Ernest Douwes Dekker, Tjipto Mangoenkoesoemo, and Ki Hajar Dewantara; he became the party's head in Aceh. He also founded the Acehnese Society (Aceh Vereniging) and led the Aceh branches of the Islamic Youth Group (Jong Islamietan Bond) and Sumatran Youth Group (Jong Sumatranen Bond). Beginning in this period he became an ardent supporter of the Taman Siswa and Muhammadiyah social organisations, which continued until his death.

On 16 May 1927, Nyak Arif was selected to join the People's Council of Aceh (Volksraad Aceh) in addition to his duties as Chief of Sagi XXVII Mukim. As a member of the council he would consistently criticise Dutch policies which he found to go against the interests of the Acehnese people; in another speech he said that the Aceh War was far from over. On 27 January 1930, he joined the National Fraction (Fraksi Nasional), led by Mohammad Husni Thamrin. Nyak Arif left the council in 1931.

In 1935 Nyak Arif became the head of the Acehnese Football Association (Acehse Voetbalbond). With the nationalist movement gaining steam and the Dutch occupied with Adolf Hitler's movements in Europe, Nyak Arif delivered a speech at a memorial service for Soetomo in 1938, which ended with the lines "By Allah, with Allah, for Allah. I promise to be faithful to my homeland, people, and religion, and to never betray the struggle." (Note: Original: "Walah, Bilah, Tallah. Saya berjanji setia kepada tanah air, bangsa dan agaman, dan tidak mengkhianati perjuangan.") This oath was taken by other attendees as well, including Daud Bereueh.

=== Japanese occupation ===
With Japanese forces approaching, on 8 March 1942 Nyak Arif joined several other Acehnese leaders in demanding self-determination. Three days later, eight of the leaders were arrested by Dutch forces by command of Colonel George Gosenson; Gosenson searched for Nyak Arif, but the latter was able to escape detection. The following day, on 12 March 1942, the Japanese forces landed at Sabang; this was followed on 28 March with the surrender of the Dutch troops. Nyak Arif was chosen by the Acehnese people to lead the Government Committee of Aceh, and reluctantly collaborated with the Japanese forces; he later said of the period, "we had driven out dogs only to have pigs come." (Note: Original: "Kita usir anjing, datang babi.") He was once arrested on the suspicion of leading an underground resistance force, but later released.

When the Japanese formed their own people's representative council for Aceh, Nyak Arif was chosen as its head. In 1943 he went to Japan with 14 other Sumatran leaders and brought before Emperor of Japan Hirohito; he reportedly refused to bow before the emperor in the Japanese tradition, although he did agree to nod. Upon returning to Aceh, he and Teuku Hasan delivered a speech permeated with subtle sarcasm about the greatness of the Empire of Japan. In 1944 Nyak Arif was chosen to be deputy chief of the People's Representative Council of Sumatra.

=== Independence ===
After the Japanese surrender to the Allies and Proclamation of Indonesian Independence in 1945, on 3 October Nyak Arif was chosen to be the first resident of Aceh. In this position he oversaw the Japanese withdrawal from Aceh after refusing the Allies the right to do so; despite clashes with some Japanese troops in Bireuën, they were eventually all disarmed and returned to their homeland. On 17 January 1946 he was declared a titular major general while he served as a staff member to the Sumatran military commander.

During the Cumbok affair—a power struggle between the ulama (religious leaders) and ulèëbalang (feudalists)—Nyak Arif agreed to surrender himself to the ulama to prevent further bloodshed. He died on 4 May of the same year as from complications from diabetes in Takengon and was buried in Lam Nyong family cemetery.

== Accolades and honours ==
On 9 November 1974 Nyak Arif was declared a National Hero of Indonesia by President Suharto through Presidential Decree 071/TK/1974.

== Personal life ==
Nyak Arif's first marriage was to the daughter of Teuku Maharaja, the chief of Lhokseumawe; the couple divorced before they had any children. His second marriage was to Jauhari, daughter of a Minang police officer named Yazid. Together they had two sons and a daughter.
