= Cumbok affair =

- Part of the Indonesian National Revolution
Date	2 December 1945 – 16 January 1946
Location	Pidie, Aceh, Dutch East Indies
Result	PUSA victory

Belligerents
PUSA (Indonesian supporters)	Ulèëbalang (Dutch supporters)

Commanders and leaders
Teungku Daud Beureu'eh; Teungku Ahmad Hasballah; Teungku Hasan Krueng Kalee; Syamaun Gaharu	Teuku Keumangan Umar; Teuku Daud Cumbok; Teuku Nyak Arif

The Cumbok affair (Indonesian: Peristiwa Cumbok), also known as the Cumbok War (Indonesian: Perang Cumbok), was a series of battles that took place in the Pidie Regency of Aceh in the Dutch East Indies between 2 December 1945 and 16 January 1946. Conflict broke out between ulama (teungku) who supported the Proclamation of Indonesian Independence and had united in the Persatuan Ulama Seluruh Aceh (PUSA), and the local ulèebalang aristocracy (teuku) who preferred being part of the Dutch East Indies and continued to support Dutch colonial rule, causing a revolution in the social fabric of the Acehnese people at the time.
