= Aceh Mulia =

Regional anthem of Aceh, Indonesia

English: "Noble Aceh"
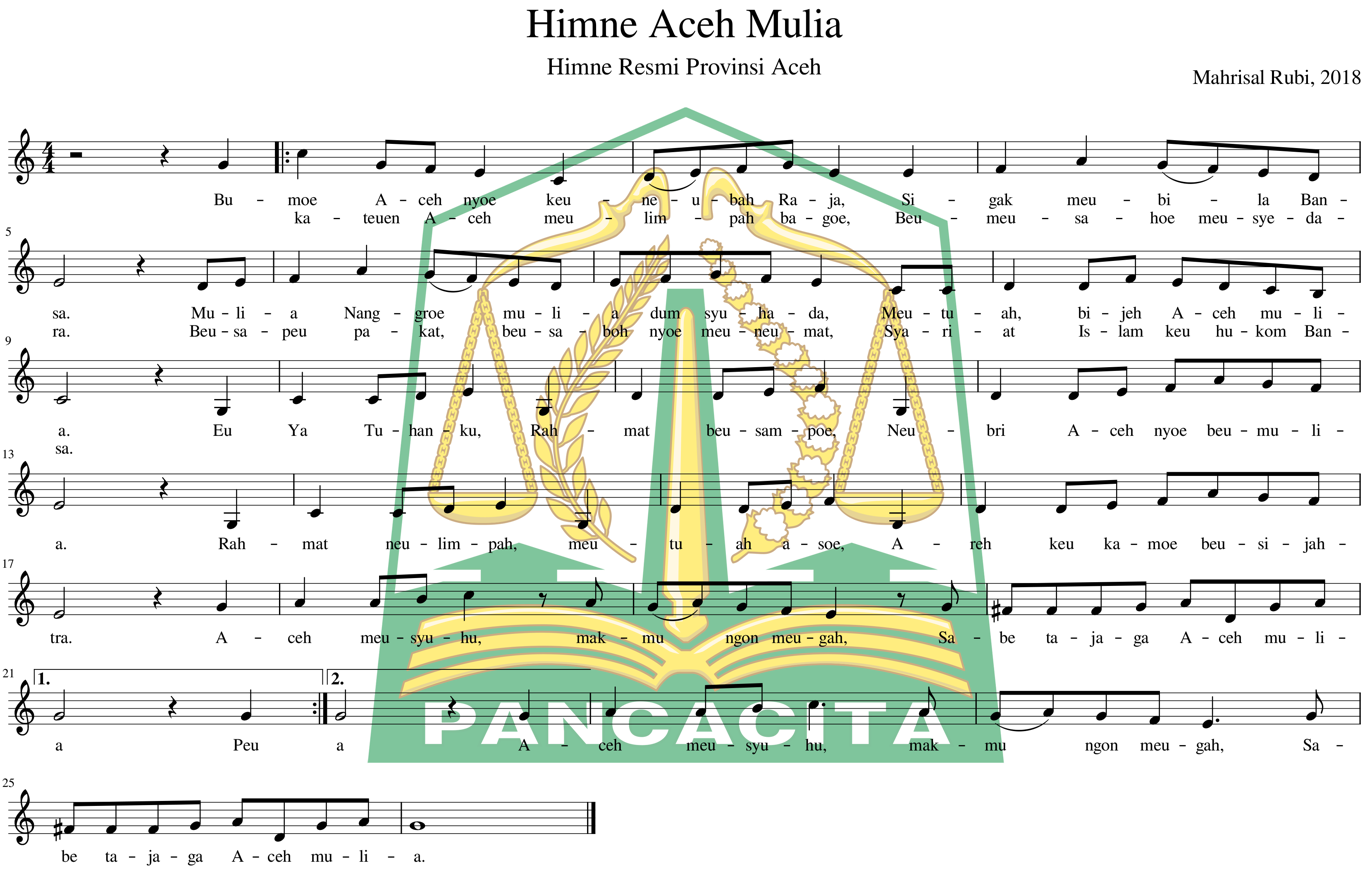
- Score of "Aceh Mulia"
- Regional anthem of Aceh
- Also known as: اچيه مليا (Jawoe)
- Lyrics: Mahrisal Rubi, 2018
- Music: Mahrisal Rubi, 2018
- Adopted: 28 November 2018

"Aceh Mulia" (Jawoe: اچيه مليا) is the official regional anthem of the Indonesian province of Aceh. Written and composed by the Acehnese artist Mahrisal Rubi, "Aceh Mulia" was adopted as the anthem of Aceh through Qanun No. 2 of 2018, which was ratified by the Aceh House of Representatives and the Government of Aceh on 28 November 2018. At provincial and municipal-level official occasions, this song must be performed after the Indonesian national anthem.

As a special autonomous province, Aceh has various special authorities as mandated by the results of the Helsinki Memorandum of Understanding, which is a peace agreement between the Government of Indonesia with the Free Aceh Movement, and Law No. 11 of 2006 on the Government of Aceh, namely that Aceh has the right to have a flag and an anthem adopted in the form of a Qanun.

== Lyrics ==
Acehnese lyrics
Indonesian translation
Translation
Literal
PON Aceh-Sumut 2024

Bumoe Acèh nyoe keuneubah raja
Sigak meubila bansa
Mulia nanggroe, mulia dum syuhada,
Meutuwah bijèh Acèh mulia

E ya Tuhanku, rahmat beusampoe
Neubri Acèh nyoe beumulia
Rahmat neulimpah meutuwah asoe
Aréh keu kamoe beusijahtra
Acèh meusyeuhu, makmu ngön meugah
Sabé tajaga Acèh mulia

Peukateuen Aceh meulimpah bagoe
Beumeusaho meucèedara
Beusapeue pakat beusaboh nyoe meuneumat
Syari'at Islam keu hukôm bansa

E ya Tuhanku, rahmat beusampoe
Neubri Acèh nyoe beumulia
Rahmat neulimpah meutuwah asoe
Aréh keu kamoe beusijahtra
Acèh meusyeuhu, makmu ngön meugah
Sabé tajaga Acèh mulia

Acèh meusyeuhu, makmu ngön meugah
Sabé tajaga Acèh mulia

Bumi Aceh ini warisan raja
Siap membela bangsa
Mulia negeri, mulia para syuhada
Bertuah benih Aceh mulia

Ya Tuhanku, rahmat sampaikan
Berikanlah Aceh ini kemuliaan
Rahmat limpahkan, bertuah isinya
Semua kami sejahtera
Aceh mashyur, makmur dan megah
Selalu kita jaga Aceh mulia

Ciri khas Aceh melimpah bagai
Bersama bersaudara
Serupa pendapat, bersatu pegangan
Syariat Islamlah hukum bangsa

Ya Tuhanku, rahmat sampaikan
Berikanlah Aceh ini kemuliaan
Rahmat limpahkan, bertuah isinya
Semua kami sejahtera
Aceh mashyur, makmur dan megah
Selalu kita jaga Aceh mulia

Aceh mashyur, makmur dan megah
Selalu kita jaga Aceh mulia

Bumi Aceh, warisan dari masa lalu
Teguh membela bangsa
Mulialah negeri, mulialah semua syuhada
Bertuahlah/terbaiklah semua generasi di Aceh mulia

Ya Tuhanku, doa kerahmatan kami sampaikan
Berilah Aceh ini kemuliaan
Berilah rahmat yang melimpah, berilah kesehatan
Berilah kearifan dan kesejahteraan bagi kami
Aceh termahsyur, makmur dan megah
Selalu kita jaga kemuliaan Aceh

Adat di Aceh melimpah ruah
Hendaklah bersatu dan bersaudara
Hendaklah bersepakat dengan satu pegangan
Bahwa syariat islam menjadi hukum bangsa di Aceh

Ya Tuhanku, doa kerahmatan kami sampaikan
Berilah Aceh ni kemuliaan
Berilah rahmat yang melimpah, berilah kesehatan
Berilah kearifan dan kesejahteraan bagi kami
Aceh termahsyur, makmur dan megah
Selalu kita jaga kemuliaan Aceh

Aceh termahsyur, makmur dan megah
Selalu kita jaga kemuliaan Aceh

O land of Aceh, the heritage of kings
We're willing to fight for you
Noble is our state, noble too are our martyrs
May noble Aceh's generations be prosperous

O my Lord, bestow us your grace
Bestow our Aceh greatness
Bestow us your grace, may our land be prosperous
Prosperity be all upon us
O Aceh, famed, affluent and grand
May we always protect our noble Aceh

Aceh, rich with culture and identity
All united together as brothers
United in thought, united in guidance
With Islamic law as our state's law

O my Lord, bestow us your grace
Bestow our Aceh greatness
Bestow us your grace, may our land be prosperous
Prosperity be all upon us
O Aceh, famed, affluent and grand
May we always protect our noble Aceh

O Aceh, famed, affluent and grand
May we always protect our noble Aceh
