= List of people from Aceh =

This is a listing of notable people born in, or notable for their association with, Aceh.

== A ==
- Mustafa Abubakar, politician and formerly governor of the province of Aceh (Pidie Jaya Regency)

== B ==
- Daud Bereueh, military Governor of Aceh and leader of the Darul Islam rebellion in the province (Pidie Regency)

== C ==
- Bachtiar Chamsyah, politician in United Development Party (PPP) and Indonesian government minister under Yudhoyono presidency (Sigli)

== D ==
- Cut Nyak Dhien, National Hero of Indonesia (Aceh Besar Regency)
- Jusman Syafii Djamal, Minister of Transportation (Langsa)
- Hilbram Dunar, television presenter, radio broadcaster, master of ceremonies, and entertainer (Banda Aceh)

== H ==
- Teuku Muhammad Hasan, National Hero of Indonesia, politician, The first Governor of Sumatera (Pidie Regency)
- Miftahul Hamdi, footballer (Banda Aceh)

== J ==
- Teuku Jacob, paleoanthropologist (Peureulak)
- Jalwandi, footballer (Langsa)

== M ==
- Azriana Manalu, women's rights activist
- Cut Nyak Meutia, National Hero of Indonesia (North Aceh Regency)
- Martunis Sarbini, footballer, former Sporting CP player

== N ==
- Muhammad Nazar, current Vice-Governor of Aceh (Pidie Regency)

== P ==
- Surya Paloh, media tycoon who owns the Media Indonesia daily newspaper and Metro TV (Banda Aceh)

== R ==
- P. Ramlee, Malaysian actor, movie director, musician and singer.

== S ==
- Hasballah M. Saad, politician from National Mandate Party (Pidie Regency)

== T ==
- Henri Karel Frederik van Teijn, a governor under Dutch colonial rule
- Hasan di Tiro, founder of the Free Aceh Movement (GAM) (Pidie Regency)

== U ==
- Teuku Umar, National Hero of Indonesia (West Aceh Regency)

== W ==
- Cornelis Weber, Dutch Olympic fencer (Banda Aceh)

== Y ==
- Irwandi Yusuf, current Governor of Aceh (Bireun)
