= Wilayatul Hisbah =

Islamic religious police force in Aceh, Indonesia

Wilayatul Hisbah is the Islamic religious police force responsible for the enforcement of sharia law in the autonomous region of Aceh, Indonesia.

== History ==
The origins of this force can be traced to 2001 when a special autonomy law was promulgated to allow for the province of Aceh to implement more elements of sharia law, which the Indonesian government saw as a useful way of decreasing local fervor for Acehnese independence.

These officers have reportedly been patrolling the streets since 2002, but the force was formally established in 2004. It was established at both provincial level as well as the district and municipality levels.

== Purpose ==
The units were formed in response to an increase in "unmarried couples, Muslim women without headscarves or those wearing tight clothes, and people drinking alcohol or gambling,” which authorities perceived to have become more common following contact with Western ideas after foreign aid was provided after the 2004 Indonesian tsunami.

== Organization ==
The latest constituting document of Wilayatul Hisbah, Governor of Aceh Decree No. 139/2016, structured the force as follow:

- Office of Head/Commander of Wilayatul Hisbah
- Secretariat.
  - Bureau of General Affairs and Employment
  - Bureau of Programs and Reporting
  - Bureau of Finance
- Division of Regional Law Enforcement.
  - Section of Investigation
  - Section of Civil Apparatus Guidance and Fostering
  - Section of Internal Prosecution
- Division of Public Order and Peace
  - Section of Operation and Control
  - Section of Public Order and Peace Guidance and Fostering
  - Section of Regional Assets Security and Monitoring
- Division of Islamic Sharia Monitoring
  - Section of Islamic Sharia Operation and Monitoring
  - Section of Islamic Sharia Guidance and Extension
  - Section of Reporting of Islamic Sharia Violations
- Division of Public Protection
  - Section of Civil Defense Units Development
  - Section of Public Potentials Guidance and Fostering
  - Section of Readiness
- Division of Inter-institutional Relation
  - Section of Institutional Development
  - Section of Coordination and Partnership
  - Section of Public Relation

As apparatus of Aceh province, the commander of Wilayatul Hisbah reported to Governor of Aceh, but the institution consolidated and consulted to the Directorate General of Territorial Administration of the Ministry of Home Affairs.

Each city or regency in Aceh province possessed their own Wilayatul Hisbah office, but they are subordinates to their respective city or regency local government.

Provincial Wilayatul Hisbah possessed the power to held guidance and fostering to the Wilayatul Hisbah office in city or regency.

The Wilayatul Hisbah was described in a 2014 report as being a "voluntary" force.

== Disclaimer ==
The Wilayatul Hisbah was separated and differed from another department in Aceh Province, Aceh Province Department of Islamic Sharia, which was tasked to educate, foster, conserve Islamic ways and way of life in Aceh, and performing research and assessments for producing Islamic law documents applicable in Aceh Province.

While Aceh Department of Islamic Sharia tasked with such tasks, it does not have power for law enforcing. The Wilayatul Hisbah enforced the laws applicable within the province only but it has to coordinate with the local branches of Indonesian national police to enforce cases.

== Controversies ==
The force's integrity has been questioned occasionally.

Its public image deteriorated heavily in 2010 after three officials were found to have raped a girl that was being detained by them in West Aceh Regency.

In another instance, an officer was found to be engaging in sex with his girlfriend in a Banda Aceh bathroom.
