= Timphan =

Indonesian traditional steamed banana dumpling

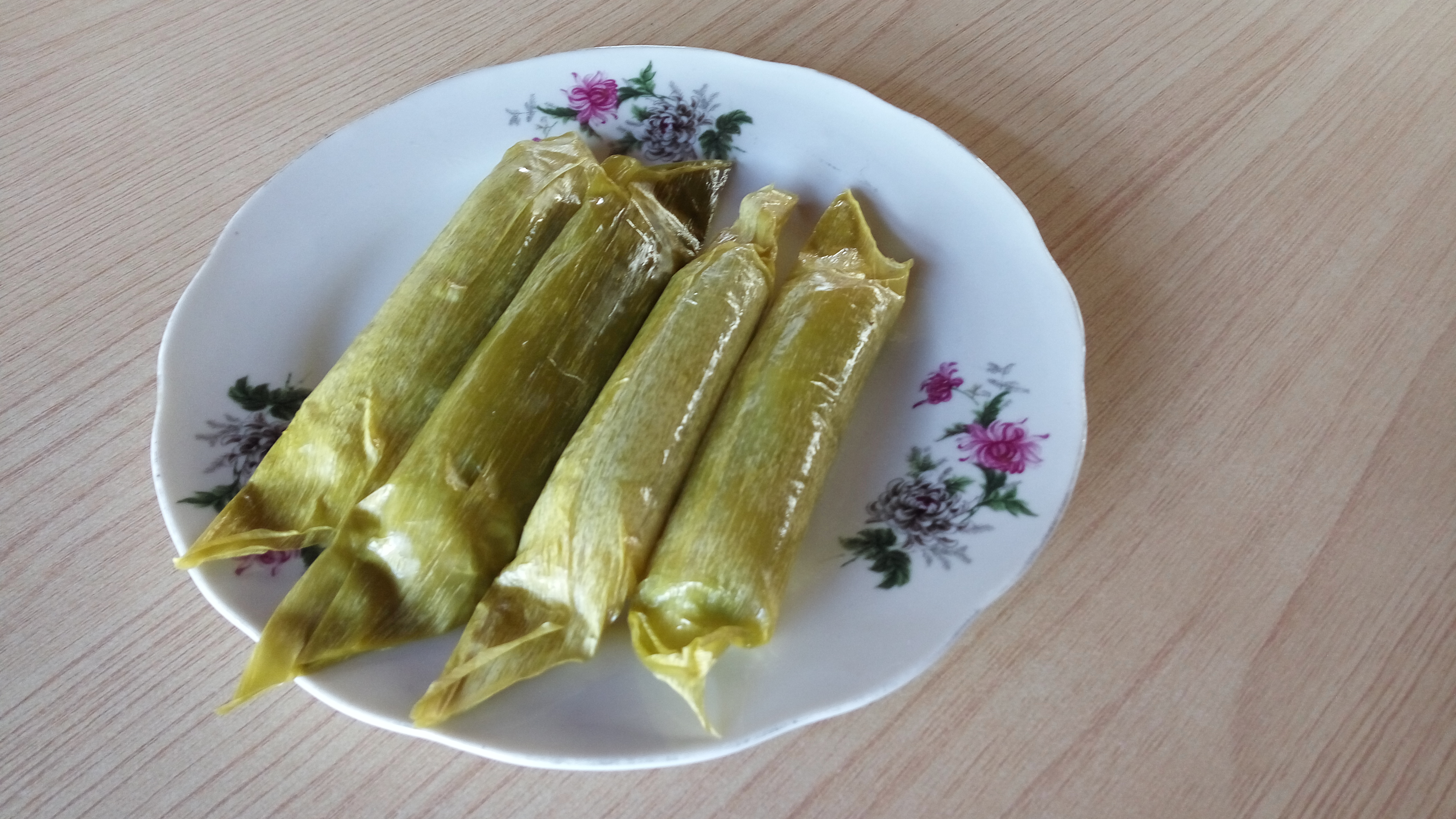
- Timphan
- Alternative names: Timpan
- Course: Snack
- Place of origin: Indonesia
- Region or state: Aceh
- Serving temperature: Room temperature
- Main ingredients: Steamed rice flour ground banana and coconut milk, filled with sweet coconut jam and wrapped inside banana leaf

Timphan or jeumphan is a steamed banana dumpling, a traditional kue specialty of Aceh, Indonesia usually served during Eid or other special occasions. Ingredients to make timphan consists of glutinous rice flour, ground banana and coconut milk. All of this materials are then mixed and stirred until a thick as a dough. The banana-rice flour dough is spread lengthwise and then it filled with sweetened serikaya or grated coconut mixed with sugar. Then the dough is wrapped in banana leaves and steamed for an hour.

It is quite similar to another Indonesian favourite kue, nagasari. The difference is nagasari uses the slices of banana as fillings, while timphan is filled with sweet grated coconut instead, while banana is incorporated into its skin dough.

== See also ==
- List of steamed foods
