= Islam in Aceh =

Islam in Indonesian province

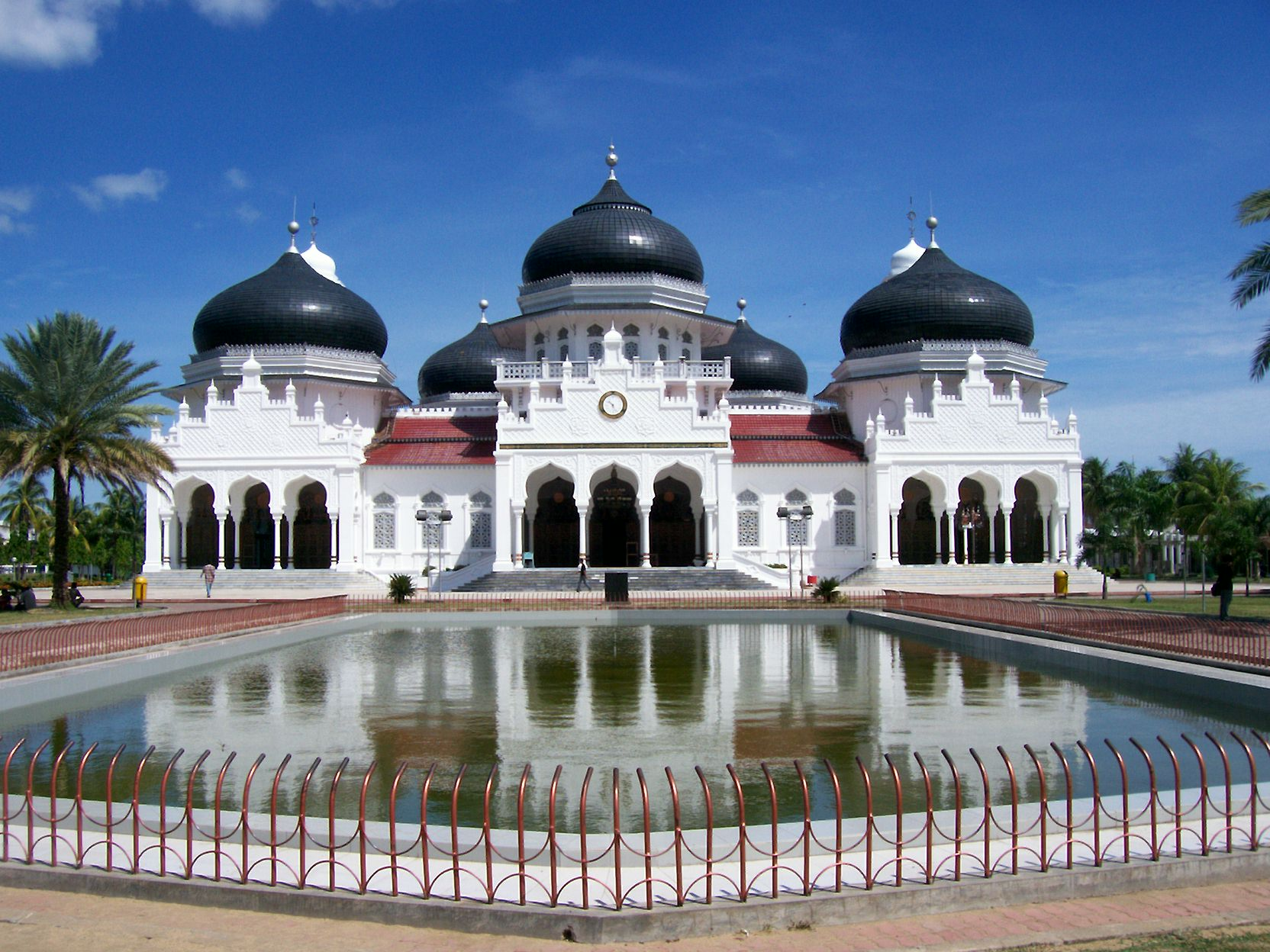
Banda Aceh's Grand Mosque

Islam is the dominant religion in Aceh and over 98% of the 4 million people identify as Muslim.

According to data from the 2005 census, the religious percentages in Aceh are 98.87% Islam, 0.87% Protestantism, 0.15% Buddhism, 0.09% Catholicism and 0.02% Hinduism.

Islam in Aceh is Sunni with Shafi'i mazhab in Fiqh.

== History ==
The earliest Islamic kingdom in Southeast Asia is Samudra Pasai, located along the northern coast of Aceh. Its earliest tombstones date back to 1226 CE / 622 Hijri. The tombstone belongs to Ibnu Mahmud and Teungku Raja Ahmad.

== See also ==
- Islamic criminal law in Aceh
