= Acehnese local government system =

Local government of Aceh, Indonesia

Due to its designation as a Special Autonomous Province, the Indonesian province of Aceh has a local government system that is distinct from other provinces, which can trace its origin to the Aceh Sultanate that existed from 1496 to 1903.

== Local administrative structure ==
The local government of Aceh consists of the following levels, organized in descending order:

=== Lembaga Wali Nanggroe Aceh ===
The Lembaga Wali Nanggroe Aceh (lit. 'Institution of Head of State of Aceh') is a provincial-level government designation. In the Malay language, it is referred to as "Negeri". A nanggroë is led by a raja (monarch) or a wali (chief), who has the title Paduka Yang Mulia (lit. "His Excellency"). However, since Aceh is led by a governor in the current Indonesian legal system, currently the Wali Nanggroë is merely a ceremonial designation, kept as one of the symbols of Acehnese culture.

=== Sagoë ===
Sagoë is the regency-level government. A sagoë consists of mukims (lit "areas"), the latter of which currently function as subdistricts. A sagoë is led by ulèebalang (or hulubalang in Malay, literally means "general"), whose title is Teuku or Ampon.

=== Mukim ===
Mukim is the subdistrict-level government that was first implemented during the Aceh Sultanate. A mukim consists of several villages called gampông. Each mukim has a mosque for Friday prayers. The one who was in charge of a mosque is calle Teungku Imum Raja. Mukim is led by Imum Mukim, who is assisted by a deliberative council called Tuha Lapan (lit "Eight elders").

=== Gampông ===
Gampông (kampung or keluarahan in Malay) is the village-level government, and functions autonomously. A gampông is led by a village head called Keuchik or Geuchik, who is assisted by a deliberative council called Tuha Peuët.

== Constitutional system ==
The provincial government is led by the governor, and each city or regency is led by its respective major or regent.

The provincial parliament is led by the People's Representative Council of Aceh (DPRA), while the city or district parliament is led by the city or regency's People's Representative Council (DPRK).

Aceh's judicial system is led by the Aceh Sharia Court.

== Local parties ==
The Helsinki Memorandum of Understanding signed in 2005, which ended the 30-year long insurgency, stipulated that local political parties must be organized in no more than one year after the signing of the memorandum. The government of Indonesia agreed to facilitate the formation of political parties based in Aceh that met the national requirement.

== See also ==
- Subdivisions of Indonesia
