= The king of the parakeets =

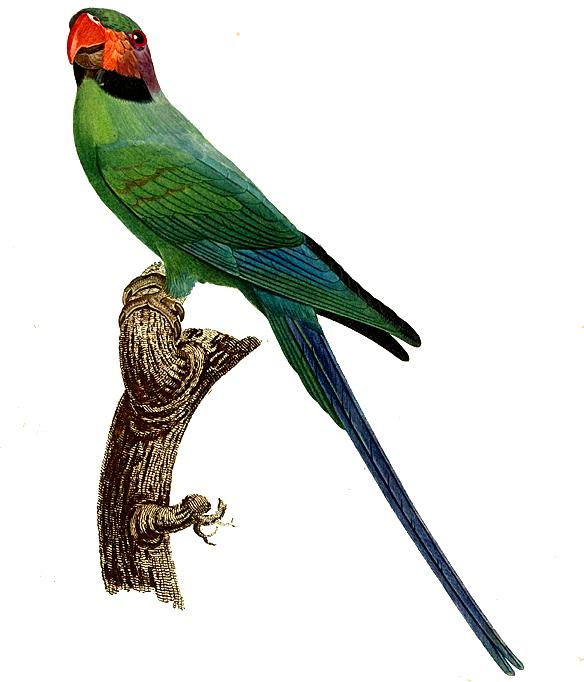
- The long-tailed parakeet is the only parakeet species on mainland Sumatra

Folk tale
- Name: The king of the parakeets
- Country: Indonesia
- Region: Aceh

The king of the parakeets (Indonesian: Si Parkit Raja Parakeet) is a folktale from Aceh in northern Sumatra. The story is about the leader of the parakeets, who tried to escape from a golden cage after being trapped.
