= Aceh Tsunami Museum =

Museum in Indonesia

- Museum Tsunami Aceh
- Aceh Tsunami Museum

- Location in Aceh Aceh Tsunami Museum (Indonesia)
- Established: February 23, 2009
- Location: Banda Aceh, Aceh, Indonesia
- Coordinates: 5°32′51.8″N 95°18′54.3″E
- Website: museumtsunami.acehprov.go.id
- Opening hours: Open daily : 9am to 12pm, 2pm to 4pm

The Aceh Tsunami Museum is located in Banda Aceh, in Aceh province, Indonesia.

== Collection ==
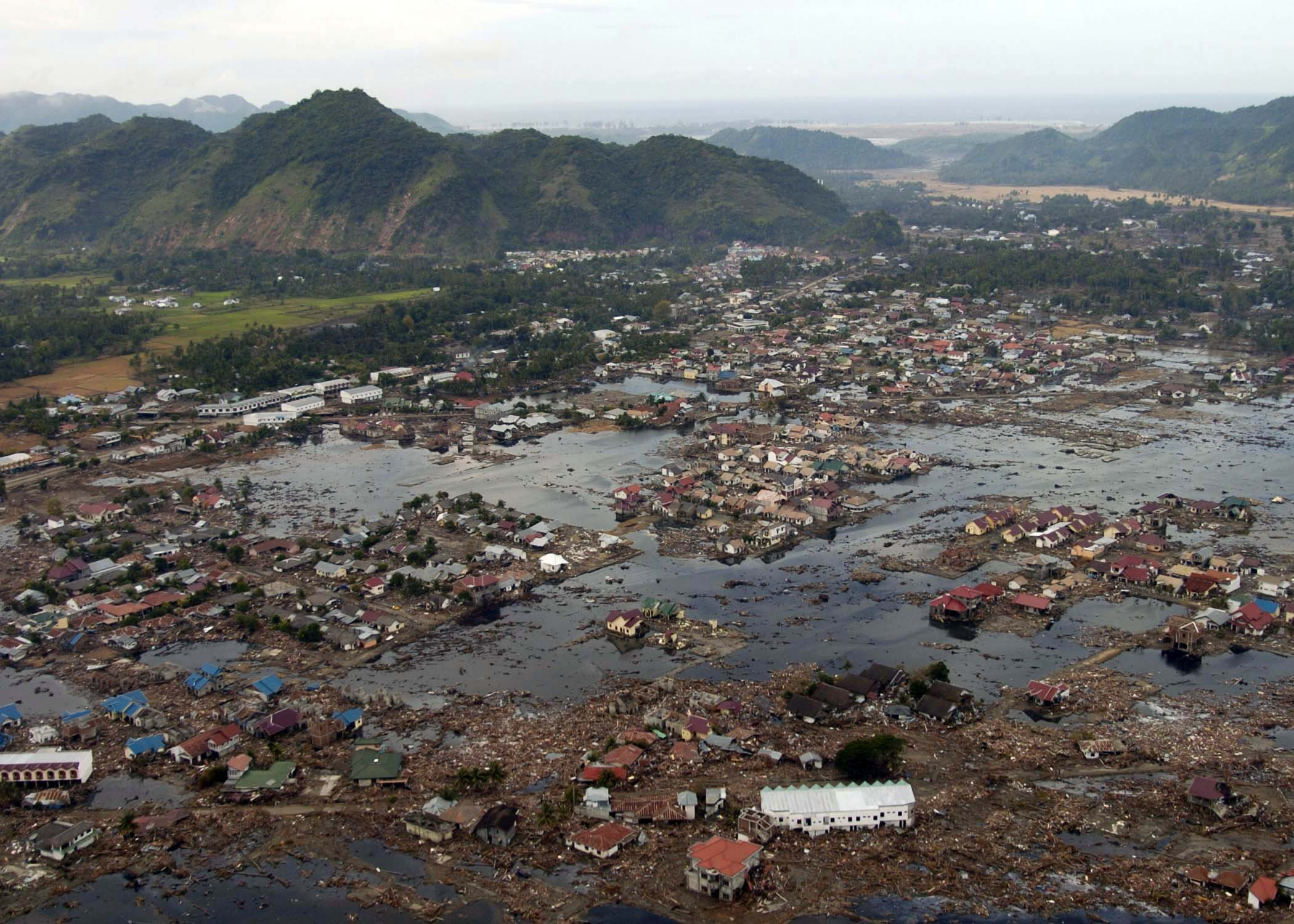
Banda Aceh after the tsunami

It also has on permanent display a documentary film by Australian filmmaker Jolyon Hoff, titled Aceh – Ten Years After the Tsunami.
