= Hikayat Banta Beuransyah =

Acehnese folktale from Indonesia

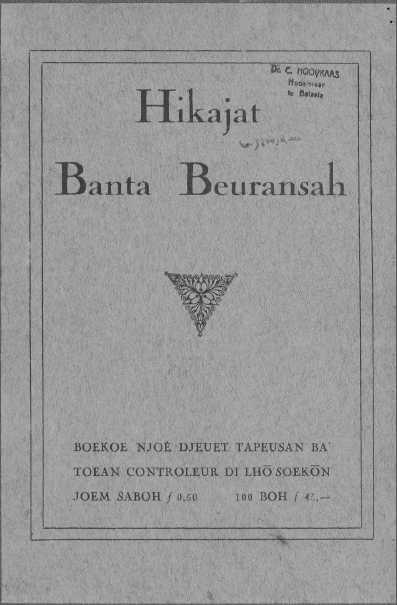
Hikayat Banta Beuransyah

Hikayat Banta Beuransyah is a folktale from Aceh, the westernmost province of Indonesia. Banta Berensyah is the name of a kid. He tries to win a competition that is made by the king. The prize is to be married to the king's daughter.

== External link ==
- "Hikajat Banta Beuransah | Digital Collections". digitalcollections.universiteitleiden.nl (in Acehnese).
