= Aceh =

Autonomous province in Sumatra, Indonesia

Aceh Nanggroe Acèh Darussalam
- Province with special status
- Government of Aceh; Pemerintah Aceh
- Coat of arms
- Nickname(s): Serambi Mekah "Porch of Mecca"
- Motto: Pancacita (Sanskrit) "Five Ideals"
- Anthem: Acèh Mulia "Noble Aceh"
- Aceh in Indonesia
- Interactive map of Aceh
- Coordinates: 05°33′25″N 95°19′34″E
- Country: Indonesia
- Region: Sumatra (Western Indonesia)
- Province status: 7 December 1956
- Capital and largest city: Banda Aceh

Government
  - Type: Special autonomous province
  - Body: Aceh Provincial Government
  - Wali Nanggroë (Note: The Wali Nanggroë or Wali Nanggroe is an institution that governs customary leadership in Aceh.): Malik Mahmud
  - Governor: Muzakir Manaf (PA)
  - Vice Governor: Fadhlullah
  - Legislature: Aceh House of Representatives (DPRA)

Area
  - Total: 56,834.75 km^{2} (21,944.02 sq mi)
  - Rank: 11th
- Elevation: 125 m (410 ft)
- Highest elevation (Mount Leuser): 3,466 m (11,371 ft)
- Lowest elevation: 0 m (0 ft)

Population (mid 2024)
  - Total: 5,625,960
  - Rank: 14th
  - Density: 98.9880/km^{2} (256.378/sq mi)
  - Rank: 20th
- Demonyms: Acehnese; Achinese

Demographics
  - Ethnic groups (2010): 71.72% Acehnese; 9.08% Javanese; 7.33% Gayo; 3.34% Batak; 2.16% Tamiang Malays; 1.43% Aneuk Jamèë; 1.13% Singkil; 1.04% Minangkabau; 0.75% Simeulue; 2.02% others
  - Religion (2024): 98.61% Islam: 1.27% Christiaity; 1.16% Protestantism; 0.11% Catholicism; 0,11% Buddhism 0.01% other
  - Languages and dialects: Indonesian (official); Acehnese (co-official); Alas-Kluet; Gayo; Tamiang Malay; Jamèë; Leukon; Simeulue; Sigulai; Singkil; Halobanese; Leukon
- Time zone: UTC+7 (Indonesia Western Time)
- ISO 3166 code: ID - AC
- GDP (nominal): 2022
- Total: Rp 211.8 trillion (20th); US$ 14.3 billion; Int$ 44.5 billion (PPP)
- Per capita: Rp 39.2 million (30th); US$ 2,637; Int$ 8,229 (PPP)
- Growth: ▲0.009
- HDI (2024): ▲0.7623 (11th) – high
- Website: acehprov.go.id

Aceh (Note: English: /ˈɑːtʃeɪ/ AH-chay; Indonesian: [ˈatʃɛh], Old Spelling: Atjeh; Acehnese: Acèh [aˈcɛh], Husaini: Atjèh, Jawoe: اچيه) is the westernmost province of Indonesia. It is located on the northern end of Sumatra island, with Banda Aceh being its capital and largest city. It is bordered by the Indian Ocean to the west, Strait of Malacca to the northeast, and the province of North Sumatra to the east as its sole land border. It shares maritime borders with Malaysia and Thailand to the east, and the Andaman and Nicobar Islands of India to the north.

Granted special autonomous status, Aceh is a religiously conservative territory, with the majority of its population being Muslim; it is the only Indonesian province to officially integrate Islamic law (Sharia). There are ten indigenous ethnic groups in this region, the largest being the Acehnese people, accounting for approximately 70% of the region's population of about 5.626 million people in mid 2025; it is projected to be 5,695,900 in mid 2026, increasing annually by about 1.24%. Its land area spans 56,834.75 km^{2}.

Aceh is a provincial region that constitutes a unified legal community with a special status and is granted special authorities to regulate and manage its own governmental affairs and local interests in accordance with laws and regulations within the system and principles of the Unitary State of the Republic of Indonesia, based on the 1945 Constitution of the Republic of Indonesia, and is led by a governor.

Aceh is where the spread of Islam in Indonesia began. It was a key location for the spread of Islam in Southeast Asia more broadly. Islam reached Aceh (Kingdoms of Fansur and Lamuri) around 1250. In the early 17th century, the Aceh Sultanate was the wealthiest, most powerful, and most cultivated state in the Strait of Malacca. Aceh has a history of political independence and resistance to control by outsiders, including the former Dutch East Indies and later the Indonesian governments.

Aceh has substantial natural resources of oil and natural gas. Aceh was the closest point of land to the epicenter of the 2004 Indian Ocean earthquake and tsunami, which devastated much of the western coast of the province. Approximately 170,000 Indonesians were killed or went missing in the disaster. The disaster helped precipitate the peace agreement between the government of Indonesia and the separatist group of Free Aceh Movement.

== Name ==
Aceh was first known as Aceh Darussalam (1511–1945). Upon its formation in 1956 it bore the name Aceh before being renamed to the Daerah Istimewa Aceh (Special Region of Aceh; 1959–2001), Nanggroe Aceh Darussalam (2001–2009), and back to Aceh (2009–present). In the past it was also spelled as Acheh, Atjeh, and Achin.

== History ==
=== Prehistory ===
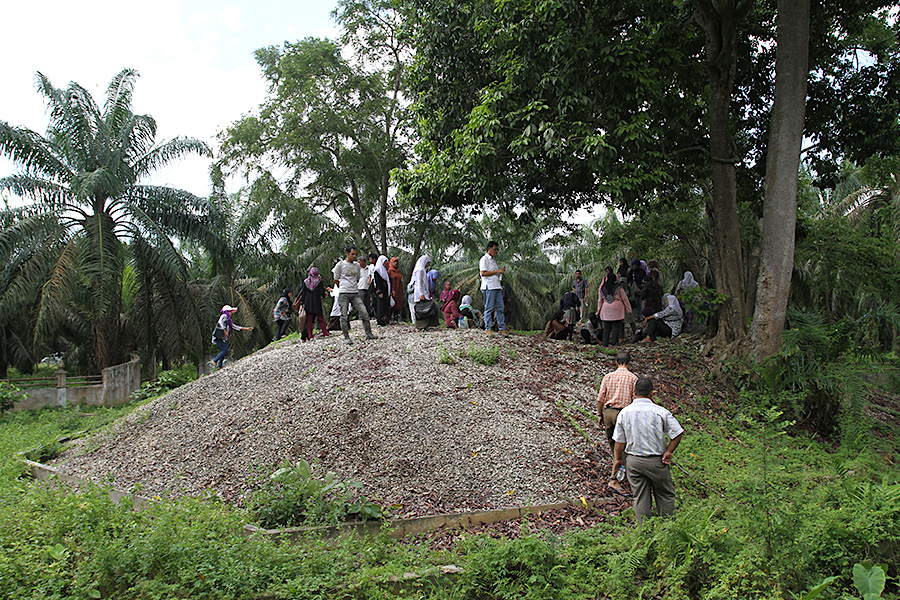
Mollusca piles in Aceh Tamiang Regency

According to several archaeological findings, the first evidence of human habitation in Aceh is from a site near the Tamiang River, where shell middens are present. Stone tools and faunal remains were also found on the site. Archeologists believe the site was first occupied around 10,000 BCE.

=== Pre-Islamic Aceh ===
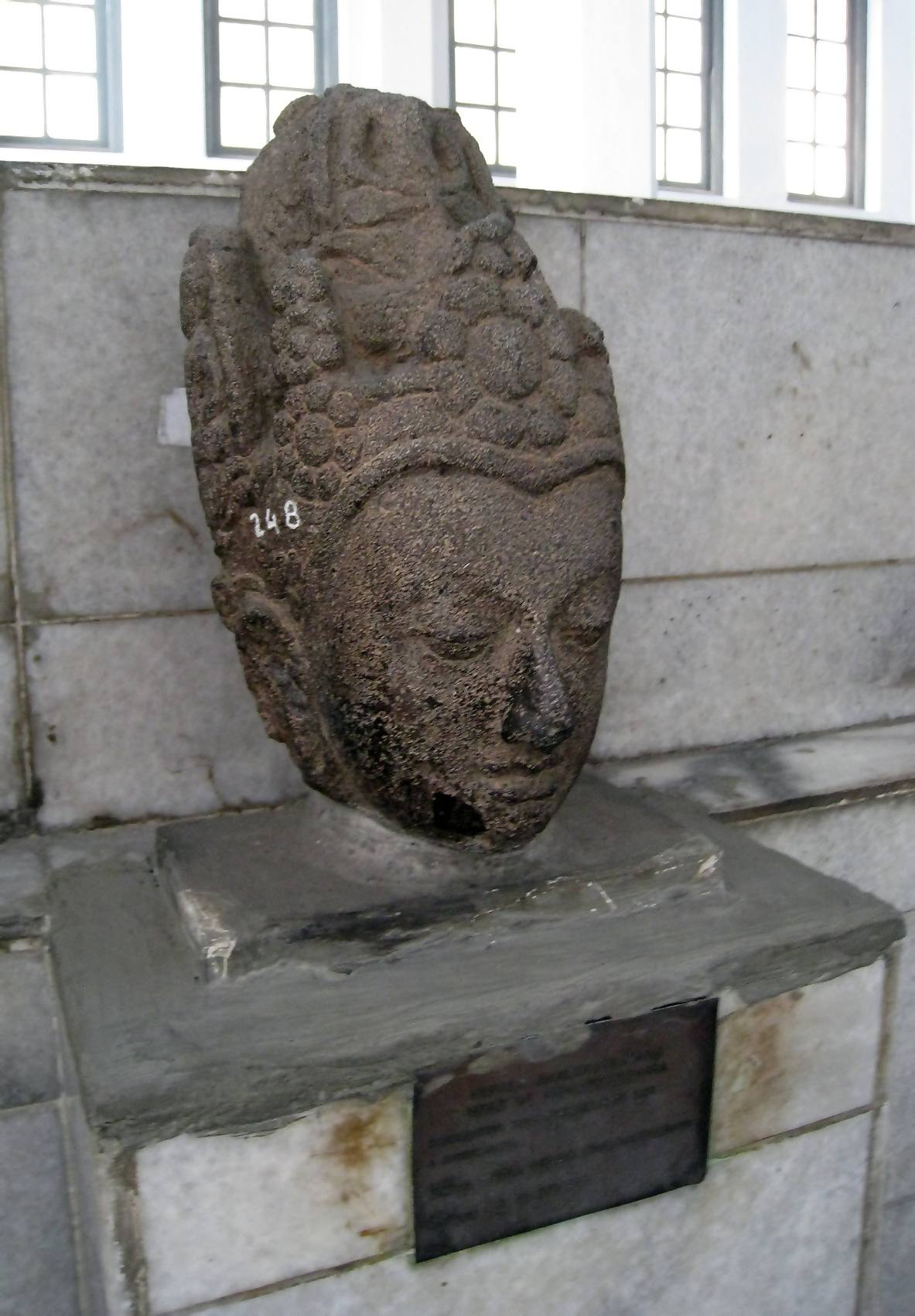
Head of Avalokiteshvara from Aceh.

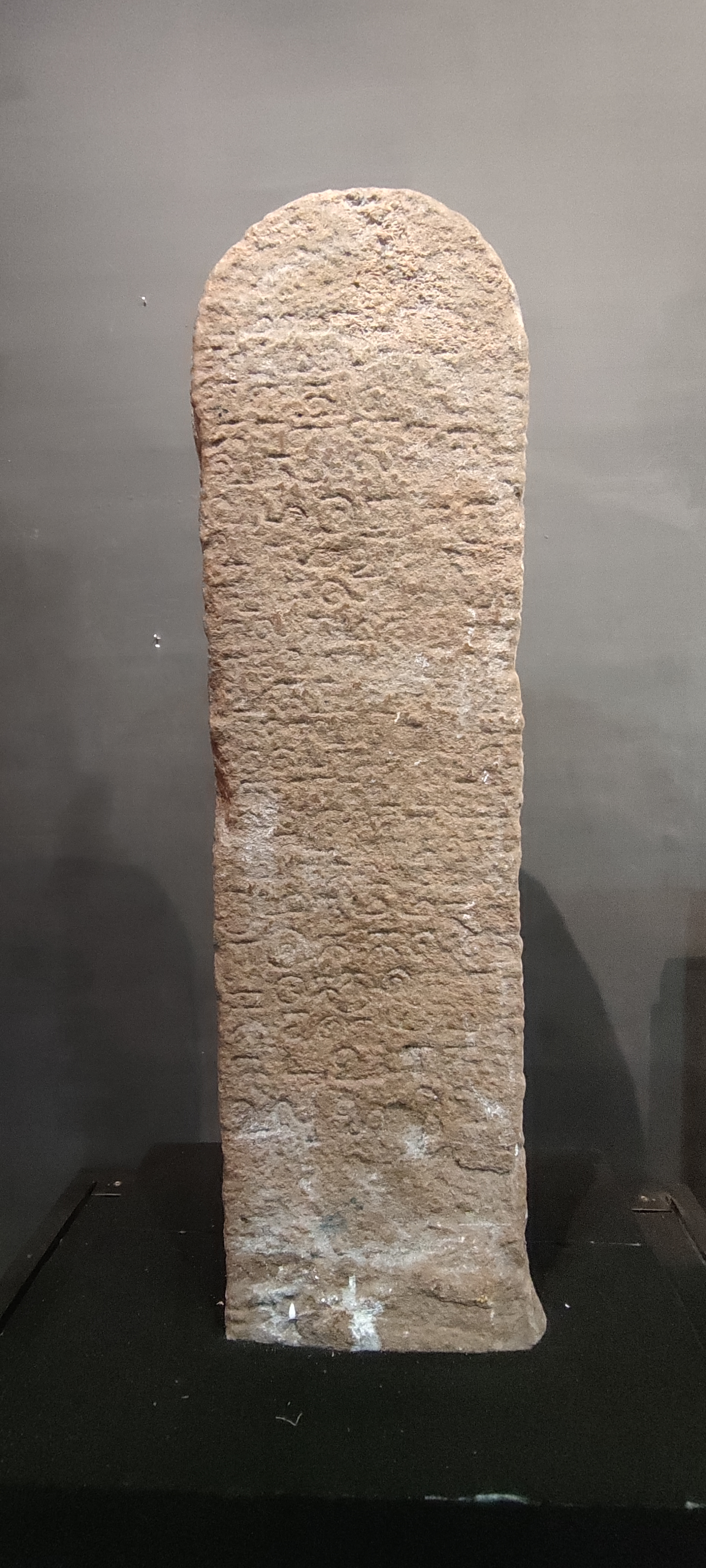
Neusu inscription stored in the Aceh Museum

The history of Aceh stretches back to the Lambri Kingdom. Several documented references indicate that Hindu-Buddhist culture existed in the area before its Islamization.

The people of Lambri were described by Marco Polo as "idolaters", who had a maharaja as their ruler (a king in the Hindu political structure), likely meaning they were Hindus, Buddhists, or a combination thereof.

The inscription at Tanjore of Rajendra I documents the conquest of a land called "llämuridesam", located at the northern tip of Sumatra. The Nagarakretagama documents the possessions of the Imperial Majapahit and states that it controls Barat (identified as the western coast of Aceh). Chinese records indicate that Aceh was under the control of the Sriwijaya.

Though many temples were left abandoned or converted into mosques, such as the Indrapuri Old Mosque, some evidence remains, such as the head of a stone sculpture of Avalokiteshvara Boddhisattva that was discovered in Aceh. Images of Amitabha Buddhas adorn his crown, facing forward and on each side. Srivijayan art estimated 9th-century CE collection of National Museum of Indonesia, Jakarta. One of the few remaining structures is the Indra Patra fort, which houses several Hindu shrines. Historic names such as Indrapurba, Indrapurwa, Indrapatra, and Indrapuri, which refer to the god Indra, also indicate that Hinduism had a lasting and significant presence in this land.

=== Beginnings of Islam in Southeast Asia ===
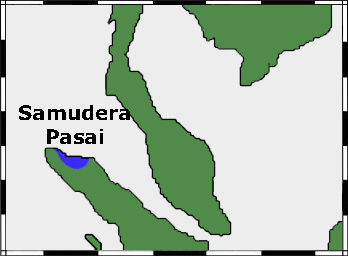
Map of Pasai, the first Islamic kingdom in Southeast Asia

Evidence concerning the arrival and subsequent establishment of Islam in Southeast Asia is thin and inconclusive. The historian Anthony Reid has argued that the region of the Cham people on the south-central coast of Vietnam was one of the earliest Islamic centers in Southeast Asia. Furthermore, as the Cham people fled the Vietnamese, one of the earliest locations where they established a relationship was with Aceh. It is thought that one of the earliest centers of Islam was in the Aceh region. When Venetian traveler Marco Polo passed by Sumatra on his way home from China in 1292, he found that Peureulak was a Muslim town while nearby "Basma(n)" and "Samara" were not. "Basma(n)" and "Samara" are often said to be Pasai and Samudra, but evidence is inconclusive. The gravestone of Sultan Malikussaleh, the first Muslim ruler of Samudra, has been found and is dated AH 696 (1297 CE). This is the earliest clear evidence of a Muslim dynasty in the Indonesia-Malay area, and more 13th-century gravestones show that this region continued under Muslim rule. Ibn Batutah, a Moroccan traveller, passing through on his way to China in 1345 and 1346, found that the ruler of Samudra was a follower of the Shafi'i school of Islam.

After Islam first appeared in Aceh, it spread into the coastal regions by the 15th century. Aceh soon became a cultural and scholastic Islamic center throughout Southeast Asia. It also became wealthy because it was a center of extensive trade.

The Portuguese apothecary Tome Pires reported in his early 16th-century book Suma Oriental that most of the kings of Sumatra, from Aceh to Palembang, were Muslim. At Pasai, in what is now the North Aceh Regency, there was a thriving international port. Pires attributed the establishment of Islam in Pasai to the 'cunning' of the Muslim merchants. The ruler of Pasai, however, had not been able to convert the people of the interior.

=== Sultanate of Aceh ===
The Sultanate of Aceh was established by Sultan Ali Mughayat Syah in 1511. In 1584–88, the bishop of Malacca, D. João Ribeiro Gaio, based on information provided by a former captive called Diogo Gil, wrote the "Roteiro das Cousas do Achem" (Lisboa 1997)—a description of the sultanate.

Later, during its golden age, in the 17th century, its territory and political influence expanded as far as Satun in southern Thailand, Johor in Malay Peninsula, and Siak in what is today the province of Riau. As was the case with most non-Javan pre-colonial states, Acehnese power expanded outward by sea rather than inland. As it expanded down the Sumatran coast, its main competitors were Johor and Portuguese Malacca on the other side of the Straits of Malacca. It was this seaborne trade focus that led Aceh to rely on rice imports from north Java rather than develop self-sufficiency in rice production.

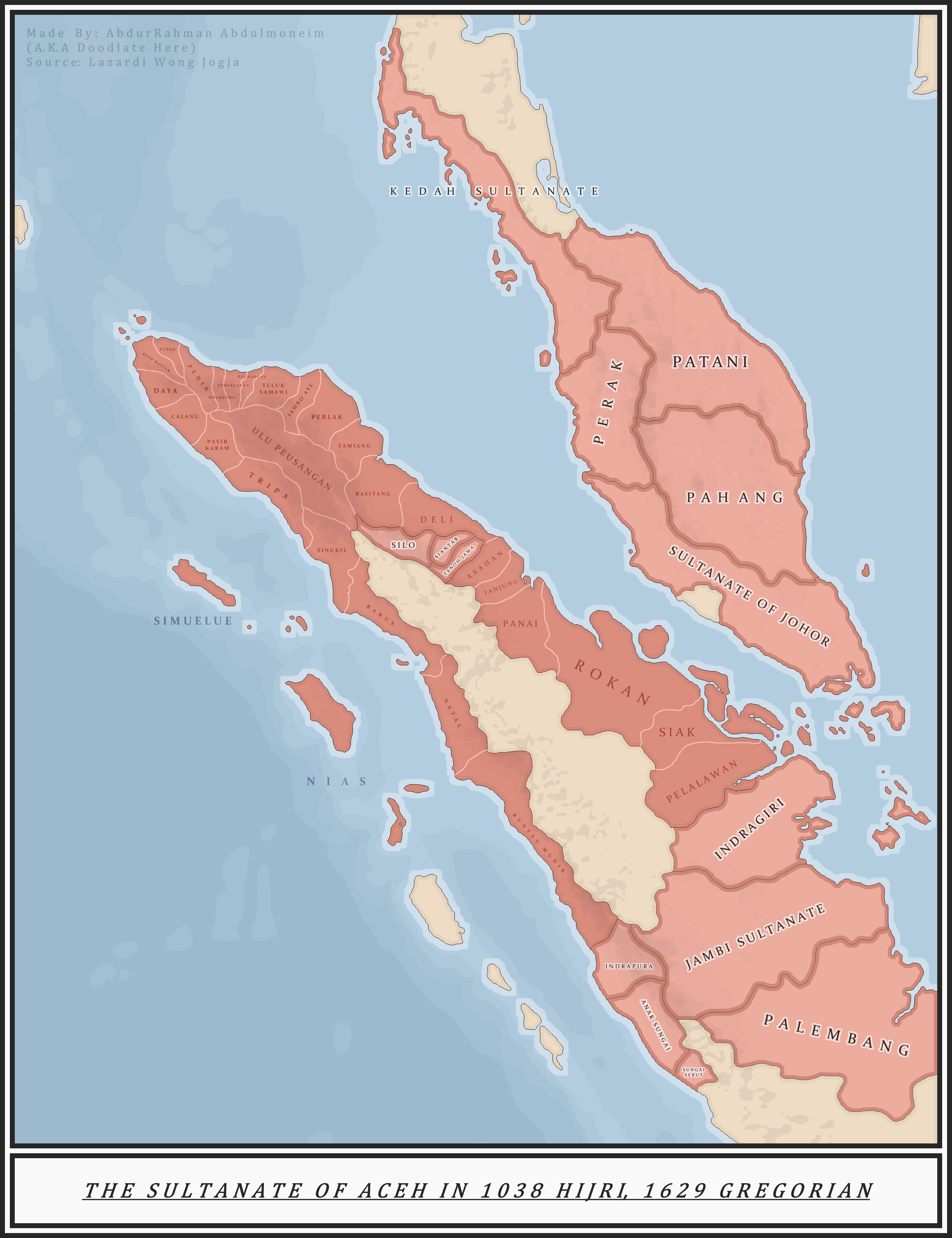
Map of Aceh Sultanate and its vassals at its greatest extent during the reign of Sultan Iskandar Muda

After the Portuguese occupation of Malacca in 1511, many Islamic traders passing the Malacca Straits shifted their trade to Banda Aceh and increased the Acehnese rulers' wealth. During the reign of Sultan Iskandar Muda in the 17th century, Aceh's influence extended to most of Sumatra and the Malay Peninsula. Aceh allied itself with the Ottoman Empire and the Dutch East India Company in their struggle against the Portuguese and the Johor Sultanate. Acehnese military power waned gradually thereafter, and Aceh ceded its territory of Pariaman in Sumatra to the Dutch in the 18th century.

Map of Iskandar Muda's expeditions

By the early 19th century, however, Aceh had become an increasingly influential power due to its strategic location for controlling regional trade. In the 1820s, it was the producer of over half the world's supply of black pepper. The pepper trade produced new wealth for the sultanate and for the rulers of many smaller nearby ports that had been under Aceh's control, but were now able to assert more independence. These changes initially threatened Aceh's integrity, but a new Sultan, Tuanku Ibrahim, who ruled from 1838 to 1870, reasserted control over nearby ports.

Under the Anglo-Dutch Treaty of 1824, the British ceded their colonial possessions on Sumatra to the Dutch. In the treaty, the British described Aceh as one of their possessions, although they had no actual control over the sultanate. Initially, under the agreement, the Dutch agreed to respect Aceh's independence. In 1871, however, the British dropped previous opposition to a Dutch invasion of Aceh, possibly to prevent France or the United States from gaining a foothold in the region. Although neither the Dutch nor the British knew the specifics, there had been rumors since the 1850s that Aceh had been in communication with the rulers of France and of the Ottoman Empire.

=== Aceh War ===
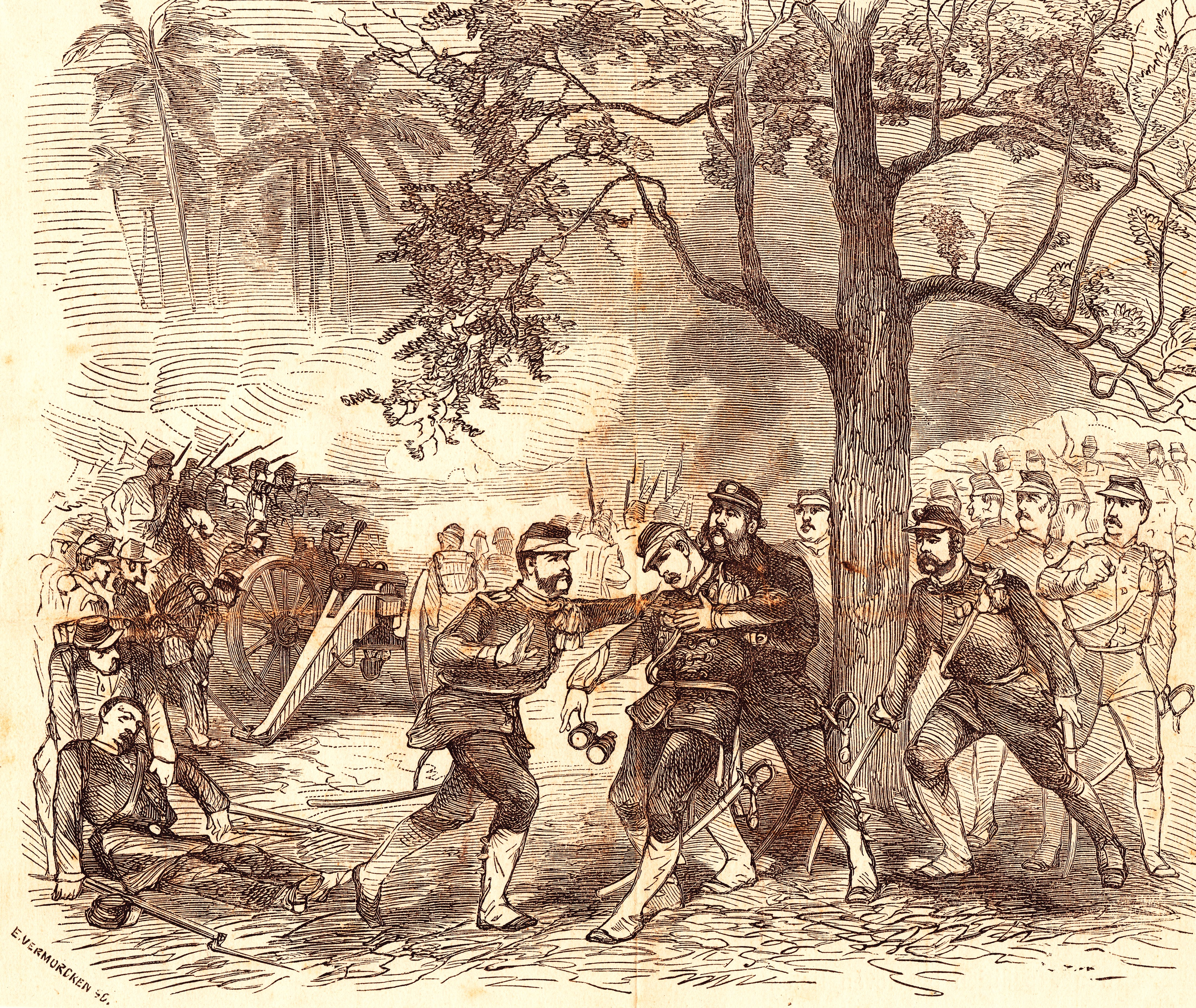
General Köhler, commandant of Dutch troops, died from a shot by an Acehnese sniper during the first attack on Aceh.

Pirates operating from Aceh threatened commerce in the Strait of Malacca; the sultan was unable to control them. Britain was a protector of Aceh and permitted the Netherlands to eradicate the pirates. The campaign quickly drove out the sultan, but the local leaders mobilized and fought the Dutch in four decades of guerrilla war, with high levels of atrocities. The Dutch colonial government declared war on Aceh on 26 March 1873. Aceh sought American help, but Washington rejected the request.

The Dutch tried one strategy after another over the course of four decades. An expedition under Major General Johan Harmen Rudolf Köhler in 1873 occupied most of the coastal areas. Köhler's strategy was to attack and take the sultan's palace. It failed. The Dutch then tried a naval blockade, reconciliation, concentration within a line of forts, and lastly passive containment. They had scant success. Reaching 15 to 20 million guilders a year, the heavy spending for failed strategies nearly bankrupted the colonial government. During the course of the war, the Dutch set up the Gouvernment of Atjeh and Dependencies under a governor, although it did not establish wider control of its territory until after 1908.

The Aceh army was rapidly modernized, and Aceh soldiers killed Köhler. Köhler made some grave tactical errors, and the reputation of the Dutch was severely harmed. In recent years, in line with expanding international attention to human rights issues and atrocities in war zones, there has been increasing discussion about some of the recorded acts of cruelty and slaughter committed by Dutch troops during the period of warfare in Aceh.

Hasan Mustafa (1852–1930) was a chief penghulu (judge) for the colonial government, stationed in Aceh. He had to balance traditional Muslim justice with Dutch law. To stop the Aceh rebellion, Hasan Mustafa issued a fatwa, telling the Muslim population there in 1894, "It is Incumbent upon the Indonesian Muslim to be loyal to the Dutch East Indies Government".

=== Japanese occupation ===
During World War II, Japanese troops occupied Aceh. The Acehnese ulama (Islamic clerics) fought against both the Dutch and the Japanese, revolting against the Dutch in February 1942 and against Japan in November 1942. The revolt was led by the All-Aceh Religious Scholars' Association (PUSA). The Japanese suffered 18 dead in the uprising while they slaughtered up to 100 or over 120 Acehnese. The revolt happened in Bayu and was centered around Tjot Plieng village's religious school. During the revolt, the Japanese troops armed with mortars and machine guns were charged by sword wielding Acehnese under Teungku Abduldjalil (Tengku Abdul Djalil) in Buloh Gampong Teungah and Tjot Plieng on 10 and 13 November. In May 1945 the Acehnese rebelled again. The religious ulama party gained ascendancy to replace district warlords (ulèebalang) party that formerly collaborated with the Dutch. Concrete bunkers still line the northernmost beaches.

=== Indonesian independence ===
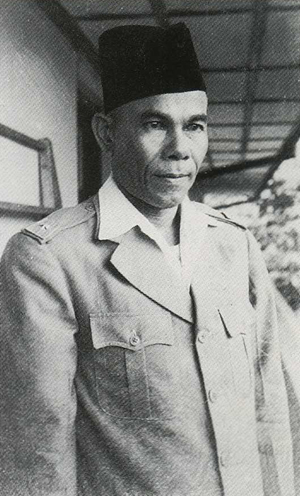
Teungku Daud Beureu'eh, 3rd governor of Aceh and the regional leader of Darul Islam in Aceh

After World War II, civil war erupted in 1945 between the district warlords party, which supported the return of a Dutch government, and the Persatuan Ulama Seluruh Aceh (PUSA) party, which supported the newly proclaimed state of Indonesia. The ulama won, and the area remained free during the Indonesian War of Independence. The Dutch military itself never attempted to invade Aceh. The civil war raised the religious ulama party leader, Daud Bereu'eh, to the position of military governor of Aceh.

=== Acehnese rebellion ===
The Acehnese revolted soon after their inclusion into an independent Indonesia, a situation created by a complex mix of what the Acehnese regarded as transgressions against and betrayals of their rights.

Sukarno, the first president of Indonesia, had reneged on his promise made on 16 June 1948 that Aceh would be allowed to rule itself in accordance with Islamic Law. Aceh was politically dismantled and incorporated into the province of North Sumatra in 1950. This resulted in the Acehnese Rebellion of 1953–59, which was led by Daud Beureu'eh, who on 20 September 1953 declared a free, independent Aceh under the leadership of Sekarmadji Maridjan Kartosoewirjo. In 1959, the Indonesian government attempted to placate the Acehnese by offering broad freedom in matters of religion, education, and culture.

=== Free Aceh Movement ===
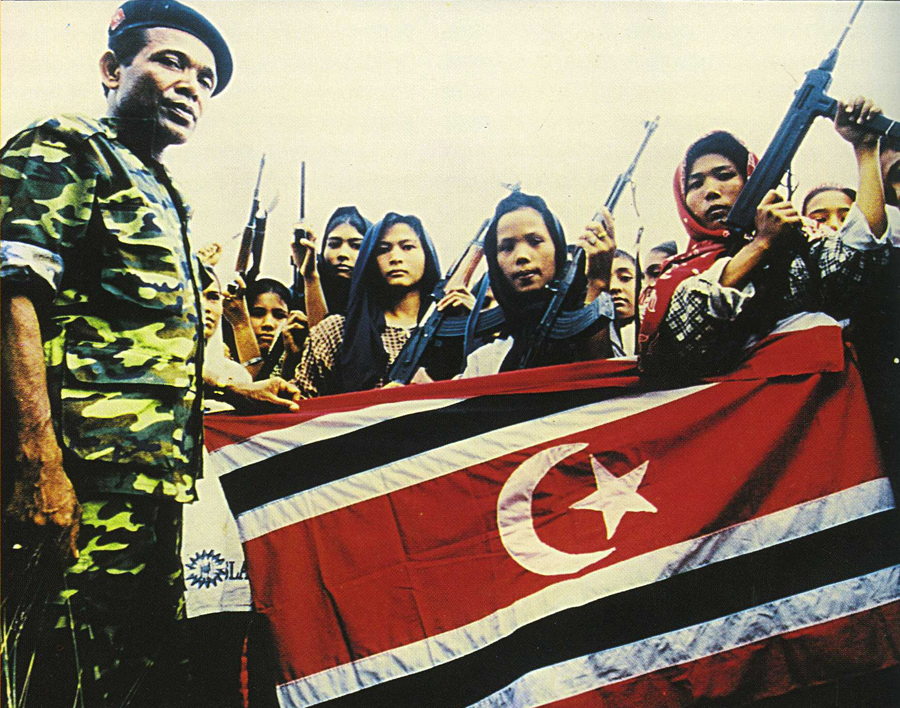
Women soldiers of the Free Aceh Movement with GAM commander Abdullah Syafei'i, 1999

During the 1970s, under an agreement with the Indonesian central government, American oil and gas companies began the exploitation of Aceh's natural resources. Alleged unequal distribution of profits between the central government and the native people of Aceh induced Dr. Hasan Muhammad di Tiro, former ambassador of Darul Islam, to call for an independent Aceh. He proclaimed independence in 1976.

The movement had a small number of followers initially, and di Tiro himself had to live in exile in Sweden. Meanwhile, the province followed Suharto's policy of economic development and industrialization. During the late 1980s, several security incidents prompted the Indonesian central government to take repressive measures and to send troops to Aceh. Human rights abuse was rampant for the next decade, resulting in many grievances on the part of the Acehnese toward the Indonesian central government. In 1990, the Indonesian government initiated military operations against GAM by deploying more than 12,000 Indonesian troops in the region.

During the late 1990s, chaos in Java and an ineffective central government gave an advantage to the Free Aceh Movement and resulted in the second phase of the rebellion, this time with large support from the Acehnese people. This support was demonstrated during the 1999 plebiscite in Banda Aceh, which was attended by nearly half a million people (out of the province's four million population). The Indonesian central government responded in 2001 by broadening Aceh's autonomy, giving its government the right to apply Sharia law more broadly and the right to receive direct foreign investment. This was again accompanied by repressive measures, however, and in 2003 an offensive began and a state of emergency was proclaimed in the province. The war was still ongoing when the tsunami disaster of 2004 struck the province.

In 2001, villagers from the North Aceh Regency sued ExxonMobil for human rights abuses at the hands of Indonesian military units hired by the company for security for its natural gas operations. ExxonMobil denied fault for the allegations. After a series of attacks against its operations, the company shut down its Arun natural gas operations in the province.

=== Tsunami disaster ===
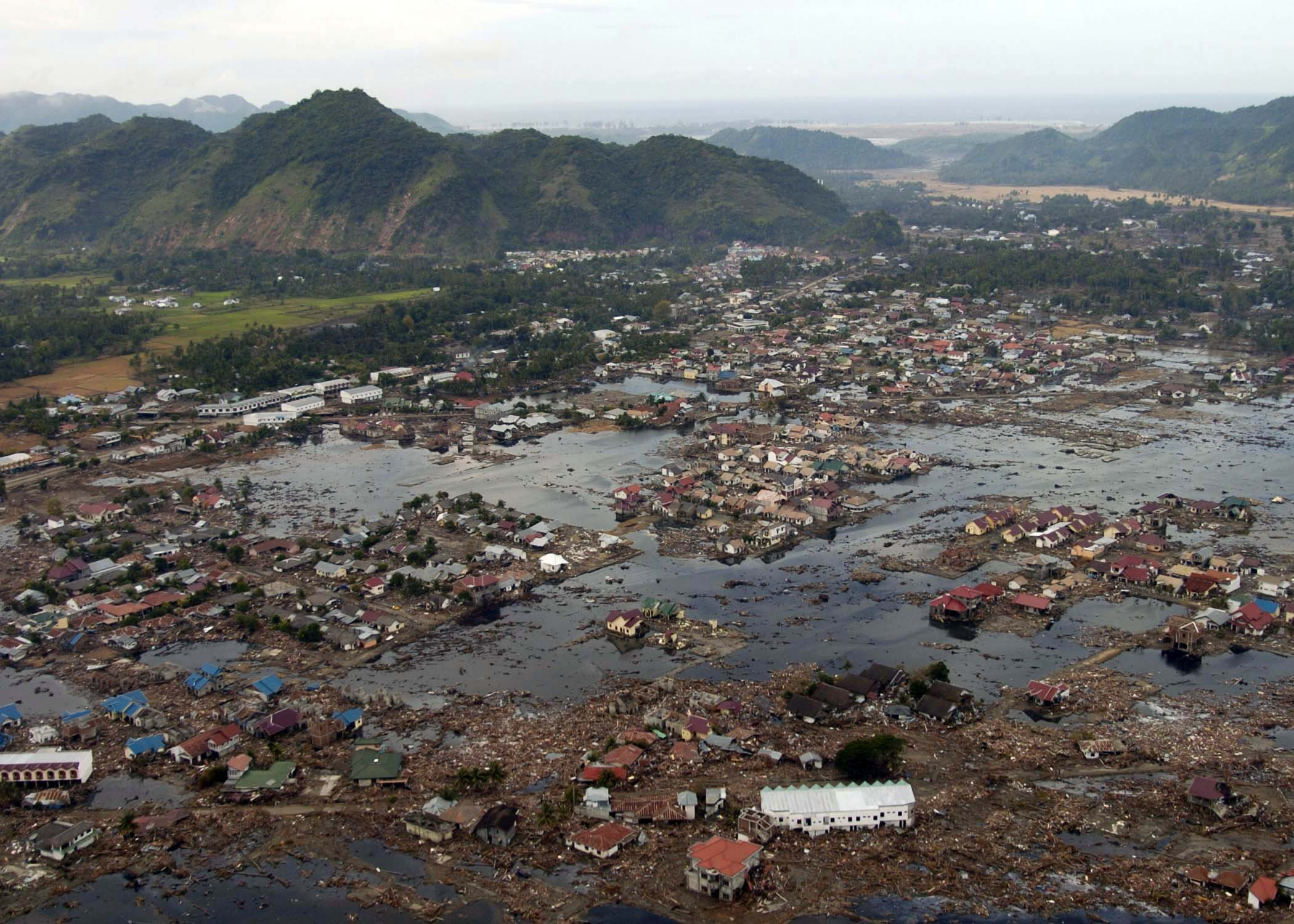
Aftermath of the tsunami in Aceh

Aceh Tsunami Museum was created and designed to raise awareness of the disaster

The western coastal areas of Aceh, including the cities of Banda Aceh, Calang, and Meulaboh, were among the areas hardest hit by the tsunami resulting from the magnitude 9.2 Indian Ocean earthquake on 26 December 2004. While estimates vary, over 170,000 people were killed by the tsunami in Aceh, and about 500,000 were left homeless. The tragedy of the tsunami was further compounded several months later, when the 2005 M8.6 Nias–Simeulue earthquake struck the seabed between the islands of Simeulue Island in Aceh and Nias in North Sumatra. This second quake killed a further 1346 people on Nias and Simeulue, displaced tens of thousands more, and caused the tsunami response to be expanded to include Nias. The World Health Organisation estimates a 100% increase in prevalence of mild and moderate mental disorders in Aceh's general population after the tsunami.

The Pacific Tsunami Warning Center, misjudging the intensity of the Sumatra earthquake, issued a bulletin stating that no tsunami was expected following a magnitude 8.0 quake, based on historical data. Only when more accurate measurements of quakes of magnitude 9.0 or higher became available did scientists at the warning center realize they were dealing with a basin-wide tsunami across the Indian Ocean. When the tsunami hit, it was enormous, and the death toll in Aceh exceeded 100,000. There was no tsunami warning system in 2004. Tsunami warning systems have improved since the immense death toll drew international attention, but in rural areas where many lack internet access or cell phones, it remains a challenge to communicate warnings promptly. A warning system was put in place at the request of Aceh residents, but it was disabled in 2007 after technical issues and a false alarm that caused a panic.

The population of Aceh before the December 2004 tsunami was 4,271,000 (2004). The population as of 15 September 2005 was 4,031,589, and in January 2014 was 4,731,705. The 2020 census produced a total population of 5,274,871, comprising 2,647,563 males and 2,627,308 females. The official estimate as at mid 2025 was 5,625,960 (comprising 5,825,512 males and 2,800,448 females).

As of February 2006, more than a year after the tsunami, a large number of people were still living in barrack-style temporary living centers (TLC) or tents. Reconstruction was visible everywhere, but due to the sheer scale of the disaster and logistic difficulties, progress was slow. A study in 2007 estimated that 83.6% of the population had a psychiatric illness, while 69.8% suffers from severe emotional distress.

The ramifications of the tsunami went beyond the immediate impact on the lives and infrastructure of the Acehnese living on the coast. Since the disaster, the Acehnese rebel movement GAM, which had been fighting for independence against the Indonesian authorities for 29 years, has signed a peace deal (15 August 2005). The perception that the tsunami was punishment for insufficient piety in this proudly Muslim province is partly behind the increased emphasis on the importance of religion post-tsunami. This has been most evident in the increased implementation of Sharia law, including the introduction of the controversial Wilayatul Hisbah (Syariah police). As homes are being built and people's basic needs are met, the people are also looking to improve the quality of education, increase tourism, and develop a responsible, sustainable industry. Well-qualified educators are in high demand in Aceh.

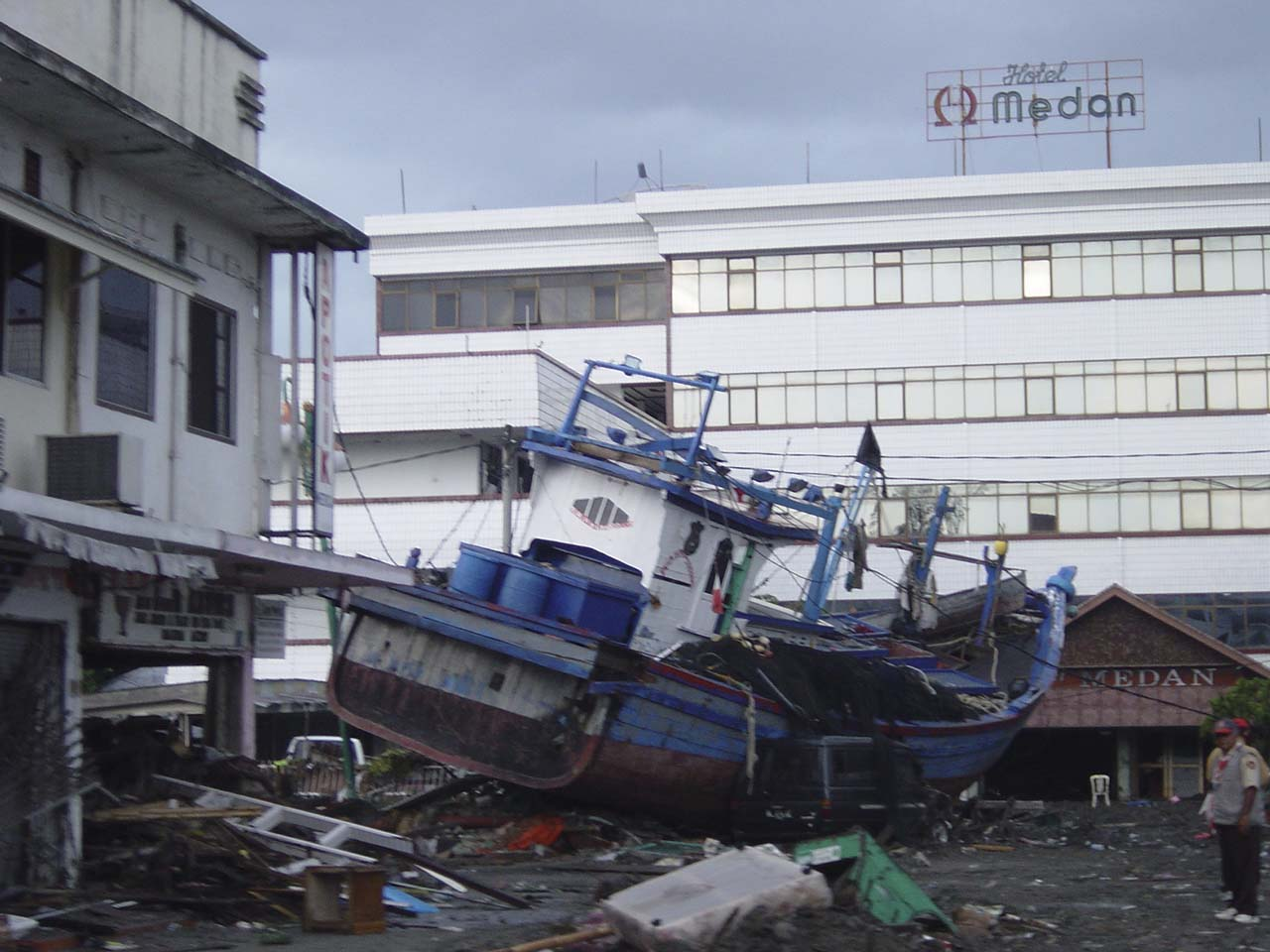
Boats washed ashore near local businesses in down town Aceh, Sumatra following a massive tsunami that struck the area on 26 December 2004

While parts of the capital Banda Aceh were unscathed, the areas closest to the water, especially the areas of Kampung Jawa and Meuraxa, were completely destroyed. Most of the rest of the western coast of Aceh was severely damaged. Many towns completely disappeared. Other towns on Aceh's west coast hit by the disaster included Lhoknga, Leupung, Lamno, Patek, Calang, Teunom, and the island of Simeulue. Affected or destroyed towns on the region's north and east coasts were Pidie Regency, Samalanga, and Lhokseumawe.

The area was slowly rebuilt after the disaster. The government initially proposed the creation of a two-kilometer buffer zone along low-lying coastal areas within which permanent construction was not permitted. This proposal was unpopular among some local residents and proved impractical in most situations, especially among fishing families that depend on living near the sea.

The Indonesian government established a special agency for Aceh reconstruction, the Badan Rehabilitasi dan Rekonstruksi (BRR), headed by Kuntoro Mangkusubroto, a former Indonesian government minister. This agency had ministry-level authority and incorporated officials, professionals, and community leaders from all backgrounds. Most of the reconstruction work was performed by local people using a mix of traditional methods and partially prefabricated structures, with funding from many international organizations, governments, and individuals, as well as the people themselves.

The Government of Indonesia estimated in their Preliminary Damage and Losses Assessment that damages amounted to US$4.5 billion (before inflation, and US$6.2 billion including inflation). Three years after the tsunami, reconstruction was still ongoing. The World Bank monitored funding for reconstruction in Aceh and reported that US$7.7 billion had been earmarked for the reconstruction, whilst in June 2007, US$5.8 billion had been allocated to specific reconstruction projects, of which US$3.4 billion had actually been spent (58%).

In 2009, the government opened a US$5.6 million museum to commemorate the tsunami with photographs, stories, and a simulation of the earthquake that triggered the tsunami.

=== Peace agreement and contemporary history ===
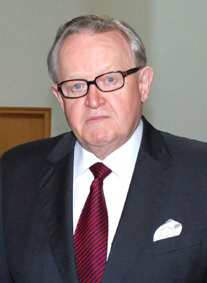
Martti Ahtisaari, facilitator in Aceh-Indonesia peace agreement

The 2004 tsunami helped trigger a peace agreement between the GAM and the Indonesian government. The mood in post-Suharto Indonesia during the liberal-democratic reform period, along with changes in the Indonesian military, helped create an environment more favorable to peace talks. The roles of newly elected president Susilo Bambang Yudhoyono and vice president Jusuf Kalla were highly significant. At the same time, the GAM leadership was undergoing changes, and the Indonesian military had inflicted so much damage on the rebel movement that it had little choice but to negotiate with the central government. The peace talks were first initiated by Juha Christensen, a Finnish peace activist, and then formally facilitated by a Finland-based NGO, the Crisis Management Initiative led by former Finnish president Martti Ahtisaari. The resulting peace agreement, generally known as the Helsinki Agreement, was signed on 15 August 2005. Under the agreement, Aceh would receive special autonomy, and government troops would be withdrawn from the province in exchange for GAM's disarmament. As part of the agreement, the European Union dispatched Aceh Monitoring Mission. Their mission expired on 15 December 2006, following local elections.

Aceh has been granted greater autonomy through an Aceh government law that includes special rights agreed in 2006 as well as the right of Acehnese people to establish local political parties to represent their interests. Human rights advocates protest that previous human rights violations in the province have not been seriously addressed.

== Biodiversity ==
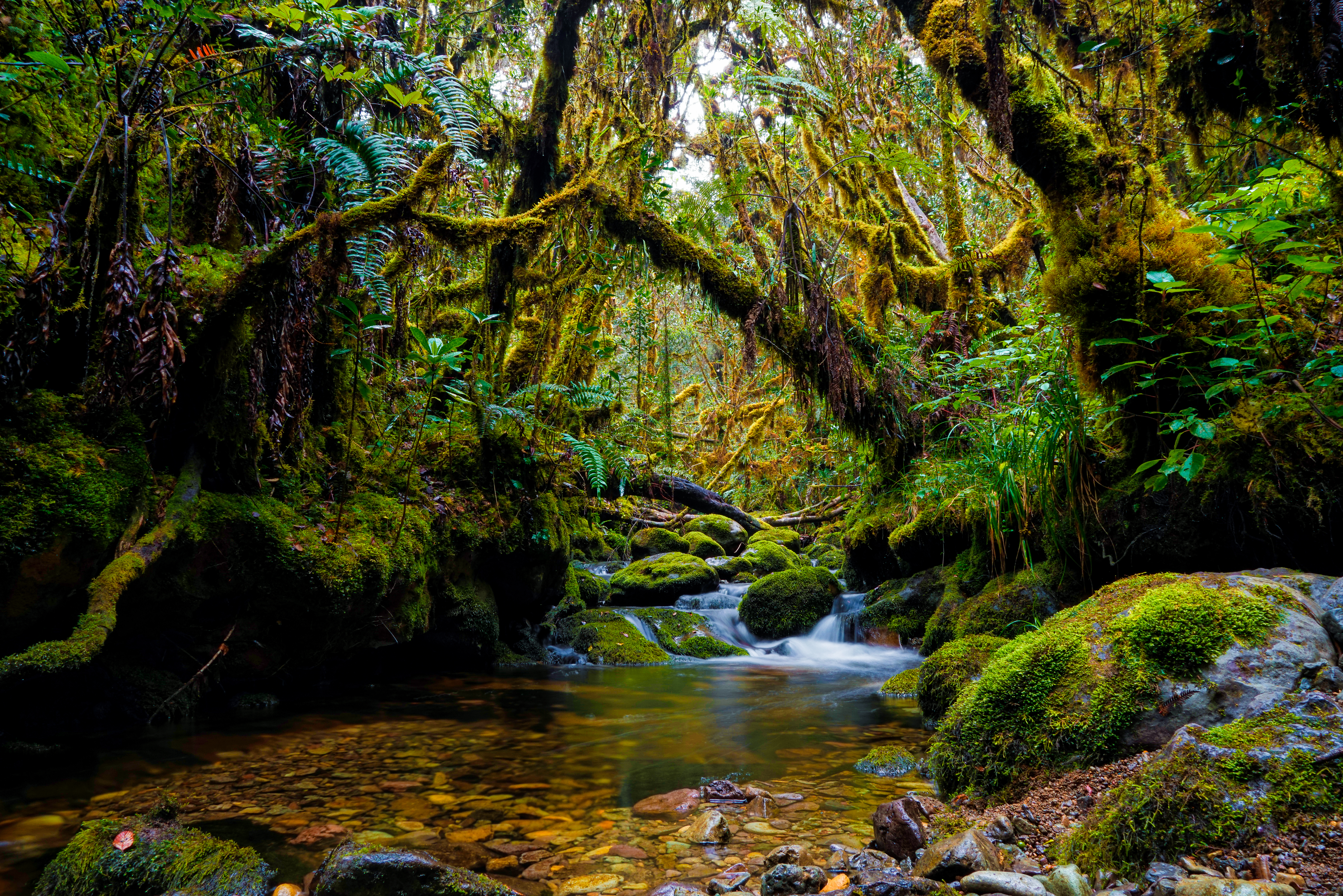
Mount Leuser Forest

Aceh has the largest range of biodiversity in the Asian Pacific region. including the Gunung Leuser National Park, 7,927 km2 national park that stretches across the border between Aceh and North Sumatra provinces The national park, located in the Barisan mountains, is close to Mount Leuser (3,119 m) and protects a variety of ecosystems, among the rarer large mammals are the Sumatran rhinoceros, Sumatran tiger, Orangutan and Sumatran elephant. In 2014, there were 460 Sumatran elephants in Aceh including at least eight baby elephants. The area has been suffering from deforestation since the 1970s.

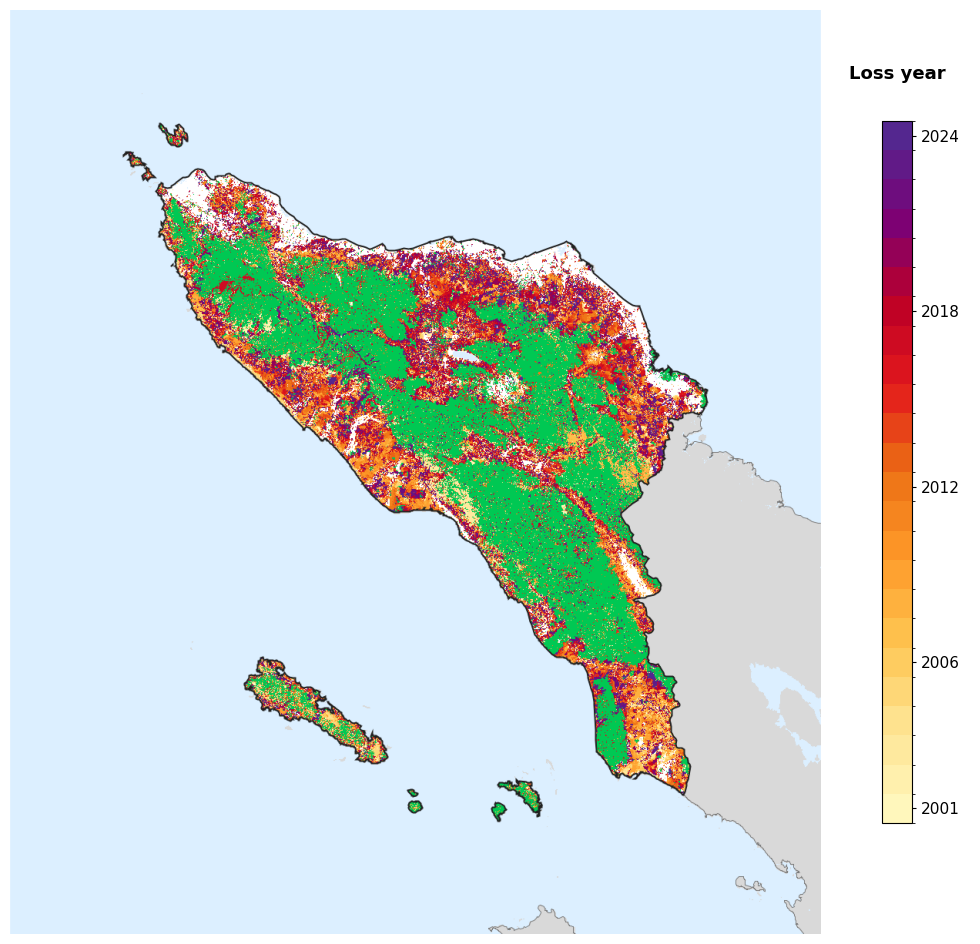
Tree-cover loss year in Aceh, 2001–2024, from the Global Forest Change dataset.

The first wood pulp mill in Aceh was built in 1982. The government of Aceh intends a law by which 1.2 million hectares would be opened for commercial use. This proposal has caused many protests.

Coastal waters off Aceh fall within Fisheries Management Area 572 (WPP 572), where the Blue Halo S pilot—involving Konservasi Indonesia—has focused on improving marine management and resilience outcomes.

== Government ==
Within the country, Aceh is governed not as a regular province but as a special autonomous province (daerah istimewa), an administrative designation intended to give the area increased autonomy from the central government in Jakarta. This has resulted in canings for crimes deemed to have violated Sharia, such as gambling, drinking, skipping Friday prayers, and most notably homosexuality.

Regional elections have been held in Aceh in recent years for senior positions at the provincial, regency (kabupaten) and district (kecamatan) levels. In the 2006 elections, Irwandi Yusuf was elected as the provincial governor for 2007–2012; in the elections in April 2012, Zaini Abdullah was elected as governor for 2012–2017.

=== Law ===
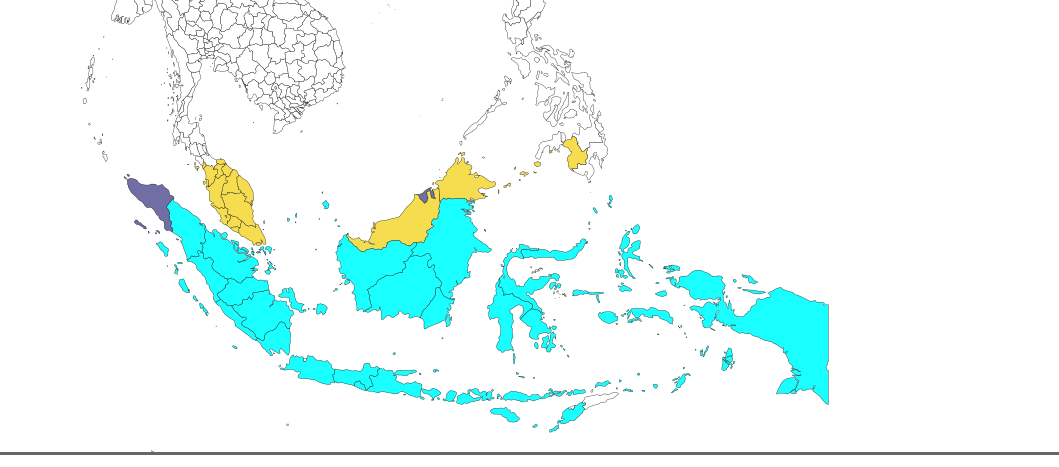
Use of Sharia in Southeast Asia: Choice between Sharia and secular courts only for personal status issues Sharia applies in personal status issues only Sharia applies in full, including criminal law

Beginning with the promulgation of Law 44/1999, Aceh's governor began to issue limited Sharia-based regulations—for example, requiring female government employees to wear Islamic dress. These regulations were not enforced by the provincial government, but as early as April 1999, reports emerged that groups of men in Aceh were engaging in vigilante violence in an effort to impose Sharia—for example, by conducting "jilbab raids," subjecting women who were not wearing Islamic headscarves to verbal abuse, cutting their hair or clothes, and committing other acts of violence against them. The frequency of attacks on individuals considered to be violating shariatic principles appeared to increase following the enactment of Law 44/1999 and the governor's Sharia regulations. In 2014, a group of scholars calling themselves the Tadzkiiratul Ummah began attacking and painting the pants of men and women as a call for heavier Islamic law enforcement in the area.

Upon the enactment of the Special Autonomy Law in 2001, Aceh's provincial legislature enacted a series of qanuns (local laws) governing the implementation of Sharia. Five qanuns enacted between 2002 and 2004 contained criminal penalties for violations of Sharia: Qanun 11/2002 on "belief, ritual, and promoting Islam," which contains the Islamic attire requirement; Qanun 12/2003 prohibiting the consumption and sale of alcohol; Qanun 13/2003 prohibiting gambling; Qanun 14/2003 prohibiting "seclusion"; and Qanun 7/2004 on the payment of Islamic alms. With the exception of gambling, none of the practices are prohibited outside of Aceh.

Responsibility for enforcement of the qanuns rests both with the Indonesian National Police and with a special Islamic religious police force unique to Aceh known as the Wilayatul Hisbah (Sharia Authority). All of the qanuns provide for penalties including fines, imprisonment, and caning, the latter a punishment unknown in most parts of Indonesia. Between mid-2005 and early 2007, at least 135 people were caned in Aceh for transgressing the qanuns. In April 2016, a 60-year-old non-Muslim woman was sentenced to 30 lashes for selling alcoholic drinks. The controversy was qanun enforcement did not apply to non-Muslims, with only national law, as in the rest of Indonesia, applying. In April 2009, the Aceh Party won control of the local parliament in Aceh's first post-war legislative elections. In September 2009, one month before the new legislators were to take office, the outgoing parliament unanimously endorsed two new qanuns to expand the existing criminal Sharia framework in Aceh. One bill, the Qanun on Criminal Procedure (Qanun Hukum Jinayat), was intended to create an entirely new procedural code for the enforcement of Sharia by police, prosecutors, and courts in Aceh. The other bill, the Qanun on Criminal Law (Qanun Jinayat), reiterated the existing criminal Sharia prohibitions, at times enhancing their penalties, and a host of new criminal offenses, including ikhtilat ('intimacy' or 'mixing'), zina (adultery, defined as willing intercourse by unmarried people), sexual harassment, rape, and homosexual conduct. The law authorized punishments, including up to 60 lashes for "intimacy," up to 100 lashes for engaging in homosexual conduct, up to 100 lashes for adultery by unmarried persons, and death by stoning for adultery by a married person.

However, the then-proposed laws were met with widespread condemnation across Indonesia, and then-governor Irwandi Yusuf refused to sign them, thereby leaving them without legal force, rather than actual laws. In March 2013, the Aceh government removed the stoning provision from its own draft of a new criminal code.

=== Caning ===
In practice, since the introduction of the new laws, there has been a considerable increase in the use of the allowable penalties. As an example, in August 2015, six men in Bireuën Regency were arrested and caned for betting on the names of passing buses. On 18 September 2015, a total of 34 people were caned in Banda Aceh and in the nearby regency of Aceh Besar.

Two gay men are to be publicly lashed 85 times each under Sharia law after being filmed by vigilantes in Indonesia. An Islamic court in the province of Aceh passed down its first sentence for homosexuality on the International Day Against Homophobia and Transphobia, 17 May 2017, in spite of international appeals to spare the couple.

Whipping is the common hudud punishment for gambling, adultery, drinking alcohol, and having gay or premarital sex. Typically, the whipping has been done by men. In 2020, with increased enforcement and more crimes being committed by women, Aceh authorities noted the government was trying to follow Islamic law, which calls for women to be whipped by female perpetrators.

=== Administrative divisions ===
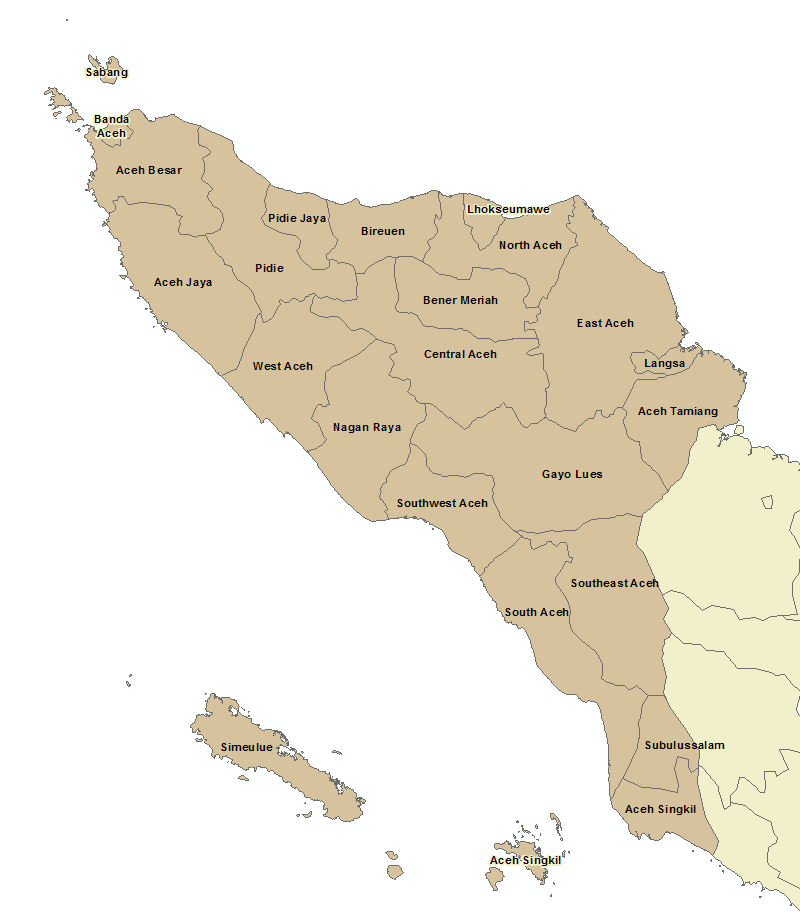
Municipalities of Aceh

Administratively, the province is subdivided into eighteen regencies (Indonesian: kabupaten; Acehnese: kabupatèn) and five autonomous cities (Indonesian: kota; Acehnese: banda), sub-divided into 290 districts (kecamatan), 755 sub-districts (mukim) and 6,500 villages (gampong). The capital and the largest city is Banda Aceh, located on the coast near the northern tip of Sumatra. When originally devised in 1956, the province comprised the city of Banda Aceh and six regencies: Great Aceh, Pidie, North Aceh, East Aceh, Central Aceh, and West Aceh. However, on 14 November 1956, a seventh regency (South Aceh) was created from the southeastern districts of West Aceh Regency. A second city (Sabang City) was separated from Aceh Besar on 10 June 1965 and Southeast Aceh Regency from part of Central Aceh on 4 June 1974; three additional regencies were formed in 1999—Aceh Singkil from part of South Aceh Regency on 20 April, and Bireuën (from part of North Aceh Regency) and Simeulue (from part of West Aceh Regency) on 4 October.

The towns of Lhokseumawe and Langsa were given separate city status (from parts of North Aceh Regency and of East Aceh Regency respectively) on 21 June 2001, and five additional regencies were created on 10 April 2002: Aceh Jaya and Nagan Raya (both from parts of West Aceh Regency), Aceh Tamiang (from part of East Aceh Regency), Gayo Lues (from part of Southeast Aceh Regency) and Southwest Aceh (from part of South Aceh Regency). Bener Meriah Regency was created on 19 December 2003 (from part of Central Aceh Regency), and Pidie Jaya Regency (from part of Pidie Regency) and Subulussalam City (from part of Aceh Singkil Regency) on 2 January 2007. Some other local areas are pushing to create new autonomous areas, usually with the stated goal of enhancing local control over politics and development.

The cities and regencies (subdivided into the 289 districts or kecamatan of Aceh), are listed below with their areas and their populations at the 2010 census and the 2020 census, together with the officially estimated population as of mid 2025.

Kode Wilayah	Name of City or Regency	Regency Capital	Est.	Established by statute	Area in km^{2}	Pop'n 2010 census	Pop'n 2020 census	Pop'n mid 2025 estimate	HDI 2021 estimates
11.72	Sabang City		1967	UU 10/1965	122.06	30,653	41,197	44,000	0.761 (High)
11.06	Aceh Besar Regency	Jantho	1956	UU 24/1956	2,891.48	351,418	405,535	434,000	0.735 (High)
11.71	Banda Aceh City		1956	UU 24/1956	56.77	223,446	252,899	268,000	0.857 (Very High)
11.14	Aceh Jaya Regency	Calang	2002	UU 4/2002	3,872.35	76,782	93,159	100,700	0.698 (Medium)
11.07	Pidie Regency	Sigli	1956	UU 24/1956	3,177.49	379,108	435,275	456,900	0.707 (High)
11.18	Pidie Jaya Regency	Meureudu	2007	UU 7/2007	939.00	132,956	158,397	168,500	0.736 (High)
11.11	Bireuen Regency	Bireuen	1999	UU 48/1999	1,796.99	389,288	436,418	464,800	0.723 (High)
11.08	North Aceh Regency (Aceh Utara)	Lhoksukon	1956	UU 24/1956	2,705.26	529,751	602,793	639,000	0.694 (Medium)
11.73	Lhokseumawe City		2001	UU 2/2001	132.97	171,163	188,713	203,400	0.775 (High)
11.03	East Aceh Regency (Aceh Timur)	Idi Rayeuk	1956	UU 24/1956	5,409.41	360,475	422,401	449,100	0.678 (Medium)
11.74	Langsa City		2001	UU 3/2001	224.24	148,945	185,971	201,100	0.774 (High)
11.16	Aceh Tamiang Regency	Karang Baru	2002	UU 4/2002	2,187.66	251,914	294,356	312,800	0.694 (Medium)
11.13	Gayo Lues Regency	Blangkejeren	2002	UU 4/2002	5,541.28	79,560	99,532	108,700	0.675 (Medium)
11.17	Bener Meriah Regency	Simpang Tiga; Redelong	2003	UU 41/2003	1,907.40	122,277	161,342	174,800	0.732 (High)
11.04	Central Aceh Regency (Aceh Tengah)	Takengon	1956	UU 24/1956	4,468.42	175,527	215,860	229,600	0.733 (High)
11.05	West Aceh Regency (Aceh Barat)	Meulaboh	1956	UU 24/1956	2,782.87	173,558	198,736	208,800	0.716 (High)
11.15	Nagan Raya Regency	Suka Makmue	2002	UU 4/2002	3,524.16	139,663	168,392	178,500	0.693 (Medium)
11.12	Southwest Aceh Regency (Aceh Barat Daya)	Blangpidie	2002	UU 4/2002	1,882.28	126,036	150,780	161,300	0.669 (Medium)
11.01	South Aceh Regency (Aceh Selatan)	Tapaktuan	1956	UU 24/1956	4,175.37	202,251	232,410	244,500	0.674 (Medium)
11.02	Southeast Aceh Regency (Aceh Tenggara)	Kutacane	1974	UU 7/1974	4,179.12	179,010	220,860	237,900	0.694 (Medium)
11.75	Subulussalam City		2007	UU 8/2007	1,183.60	67,446	90,751	101,300	0.652 (Medium)
11.10	Aceh Singkil Regency (including the Banyak Islands)	Singkil	1999	UU 14/1999	1,852.82	102,509	126,514	138,100	0.692 (Medium)
11.09	Simeulue Regency	Sinabang	1999	UU 48/1999	1,821.75	80,674	92,865	100,100	0.664 (Medium)

Note: UU is an abbreviation from Undang-Undang (the Indonesia statute of law).

Aceh is unique in Indonesia in grouping its villages into mukims. These are sometimes related to traditional indigenous communities. Beginning in September 2023, the Indonesian government provided legal recognition to the claims of some mukims over customary forests.

The province comprises two of Indonesia's 84 national electoral districts to elect members to the People's Representative Council.

- The Aceh I Electoral District consists of 12 of the regencies in the province (Simeulue, Aceh Singkil, South Aceh, Southeast Aceh, West Aceh, Aceh Besar, Pidie, Southwest Aceh, Aceh Jaya, Gayo Lues, Nagan Raya and Pidie Jaya), together with the cities of Bandar Aceh, Sabang and Subulussalam, and elects 7 members to the People's Representative Council.
- The Aceh II Electoral District consists of the remaining 6 regencies (East Aceh, Central Aceh, Bireuen, North Aceh, Aceh Tamiang and Bener Meriah), together with the cities of Langsa and Lhokseumawe, and elects 6 members to the People's Representative Council.

== Economy ==
In 2006, the economy of Aceh grew by 7.7% after having minimal growth since the devastating tsunami. This growth was primarily driven by the reconstruction effort with massive growth in the building/construction sector.

The ending of the conflict, and the reconstruction program resulted in the structure of the economy changing significantly since 2003. Service sectors played a more dominant role whilst the share of the oil and gas sectors continued to decline.

Sector (% share of Aceh GDP)	2003	2004	2005	2006
Agriculture and fisheries	17	20	21	21
Oil, gas and mining	36	30	26	25
Manufacturing (incl. oil and gas manufacturing)	20	18	16	14
Electricity and water supply	...			
Building / construction	3	4	4	5
Trade, hotels and restaurants	11	12	14	15
Transport & communication	3	4	5	5
Banking & other financial	1	1	1	1
Services	8	10	13	13
Total	100	100	100	100

Note: ... = less than 0.5%

After peaking at around 40% in December 2005, largely as a result of the Dutch disease impact of sudden aid flows into the province, inflation declined steadily and was 8.5% in June 2007, close to the national level in Indonesia of 5.7%. Persistent inflation means that Aceh's consumer price index (CPI) remains the highest in Indonesia. As a result, Aceh's cost competitiveness has declined as reflected in both inflation and wage data. Although inflation has slowed down, CPI has registered steady increases since the tsunami. Using 2002 as a base, Aceh's CPI increased to 185.6 (June 2007) while the national CPI increased to 148.2. There have been relatively large nominal wage increases in particular sectors, such as construction where, on average, workers' nominal wages have risen to almost Rp.60,000 per day, from Rp.29,000 pre-tsunami. This is also reflected in Aceh's minimum regional wage (UMR, or Upah Minimum Regional), which increased by 55% from Rp.550,000 pre-tsunami to Rp.850,000 in 2007, compared with an increase of 42% in neighboring North Sumatra, from Rp.537,000 to Rp.761,000.

Poverty levels increased slightly in Aceh in 2005 after the tsunami, but by less than expected. The poverty level then fell in 2006 to below the pre-tsunami level, suggesting that the rise in tsunami-related poverty was short lived and reconstruction activities and the end of the conflict most probably facilitated this decline. However, poverty in Aceh remains significantly higher than in the rest of Indonesia. A large number of the Acehnese remain vulnerable to poverty, reinforcing the need for further sustained efforts at development in the post-tsunami construction period.

== Demographics ==
Historical population
Year	Pop.	±% p.a.
1971	2,008,595	—
1980	2,611,271	+2.96%
1990	3,416,156	+2.72%
1995	3,847,583	+2.41%
2000	3,930,905	+0.43%
2010	4,494,410	+1.35%
2015	4,993,385	+2.13%
2020	5,274,871	+1.10%
2023	5,512,219	+1.48%
Source: Badan Pusat Statistik 2024 and previous.

The population of Aceh was not adequately documented during the Indonesia 2000 census because the insurgency complicated the process of collecting accurate information. An estimated 170,000 people died in Aceh in the 2004 tsunami which further complicates the task of careful demographic analysis. According to the most recent censuses, the total population of Aceh in 2010 was 4,486,570, in 2015 was 4,993,385, and in 2020 was 5,274,871. The official estimate for mid 2023 was 5,482,527 (comprising 2,753,176 males and 2,729,351 females); however, the sum of the official population estimates for the individual regencies and cities totalled 5,512,219 people.

=== Ethnic and cultural groups ===
Aceh is a diverse region occupied by several ethnic and language groups. The major ethnic groups are the Acehnese (who are distributed throughout Aceh), Gayo (in central and eastern part), Alas (in Southeast Aceh), Tamiang Malays (in Aceh Tamiang), Aneuk Jamèë (descendant from Minangkabau; concentrated in southern and southwestern), Kluet (in South Aceh), Singkil (in Aceh Singkil and Subulussalam), Simeulue and Sigulai (in Simeulue), and Haloban (in Banyak Islands). There are also significant populations of Chinese and Javanese. Among the present-day population of Aceh, especially in coastal areas, one can find a number of individuals of Arab, Turkish, Portuguese, and Indian descent.

=== Languages ===
Speakers of Acehnese.

The Acehnese language is widely spoken within the Acehnese population. This is a member of the Aceh-Chamic group of languages, whose other representatives are mostly found in Vietnam and Cambodia, and is also closely related to the Malay group of languages. Acehnese also has many words borrowed from Malay and Arabic and traditionally was written using Arabic script. Acehnese is also used as local language in Langkat and Asahan (North Sumatra), and Kedah (Malaysia), and once dominated Penang. Aside from the Indonesian language, Acehnese is also designated as the co-official regional language of Aceh under Qanun Number 10 of 2022.

Alas and Kluet are closely related languages within the Batak group. The Jamee language originated from Minangkabau language in West Sumatra, with just a few variations and differences.

=== Religion ===
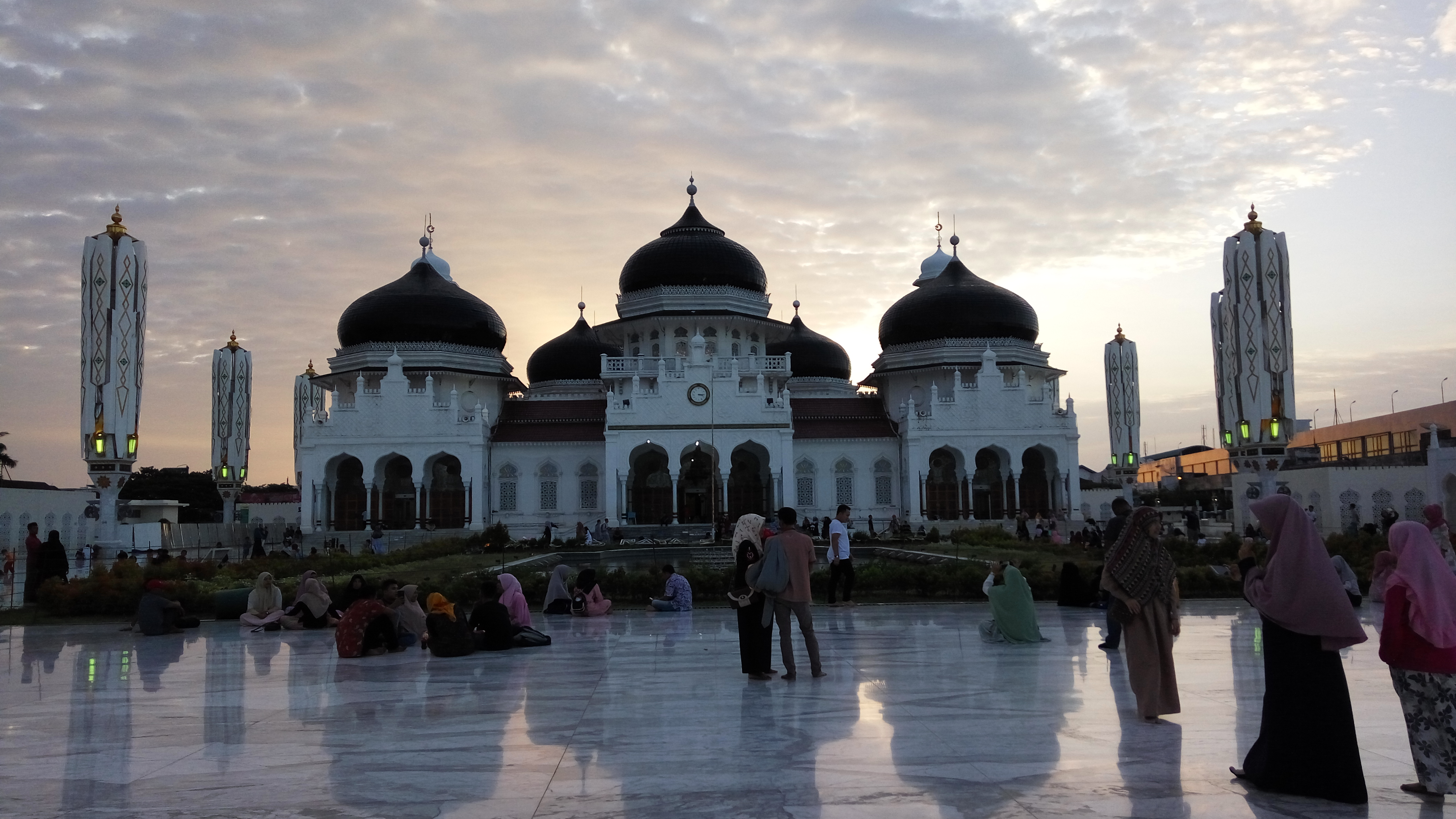
Baiturrahman Grand Mosque in Banda Aceh. 98% of Aceh's population is Muslim

According to 2024 data of the Ministry of Religious Affairs, Aceh is overwhelmingly Muslim-majority where they dominate Aceh with more than 98.61%. followed by 1.27% of population are Christians and also 0.11% were Buddhists. Religious issues are often sensitive in Aceh. There is very strong support for Islam across the province, and sometimes other religious groups – such as Christians or Buddhists – feel that they are subject to social or community pressure to limit their activities. The official explanation for this action, supported by both the governor of Aceh Zaini Abdullah and the Indonesian home affairs minister Gamawan Fauzi from Jakarta, was that the churches did not have the appropriate permits. Earlier in April 2012, a number of churches in the Singkil regency in southern Aceh had also been ordered to close. In response, some Christians voiced concern about these actions. In 2015 a church was burned down and another attacked in which a Muslim rioter was shot, causing President Joko Widodo to call for calm.

=== Human rights ===
Caning has increasingly been used as a form of judicial punishment in Aceh. This is backed by the governor of Aceh. At least 72 people were caned for various offences, including drinking alcohol, being alone with someone of the opposite sex who was not a marriage partner or relative (khalwat), gambling and for being caught having gay sex. The Acehnese authorities passed a series of by-laws governing the implementation of Sharia after the enactment of the province's Special Autonomy Law in 2001. In 2016 alone, 100 public caning cases were documented by human rights organizations.

In January 2018, the Aceh police, with support from the Aceh autonomous government, raided hair salons known to have LGBT clients and staff as part of an operasi penyakit masyarakat ("community sickness operation"). The police abused all LGBT citizens within the premises of the parlors and arrested twelve transgender women. The arrested trans women were stripped topless, had their heads shaved, and were forced to chant insults at themselves as part of a process "until they really become men". The intent of the incident was to reverse what officials deemed a "social disease" and that parents were coming to them upset at the increasing number of LGBT individuals in Aceh. The event was decried by human rights organizations local and worldwide, such as Amnesty International. Usman Hamid stated for the Indonesia branch of the organization that "cutting the hair of those arrested to 'make them masculine' and forcing them to dress like men are forms of public shaming and amount to cruel, inhuman and degrading treatment, in contravention of Indonesia's international obligations".

== Tourism ==
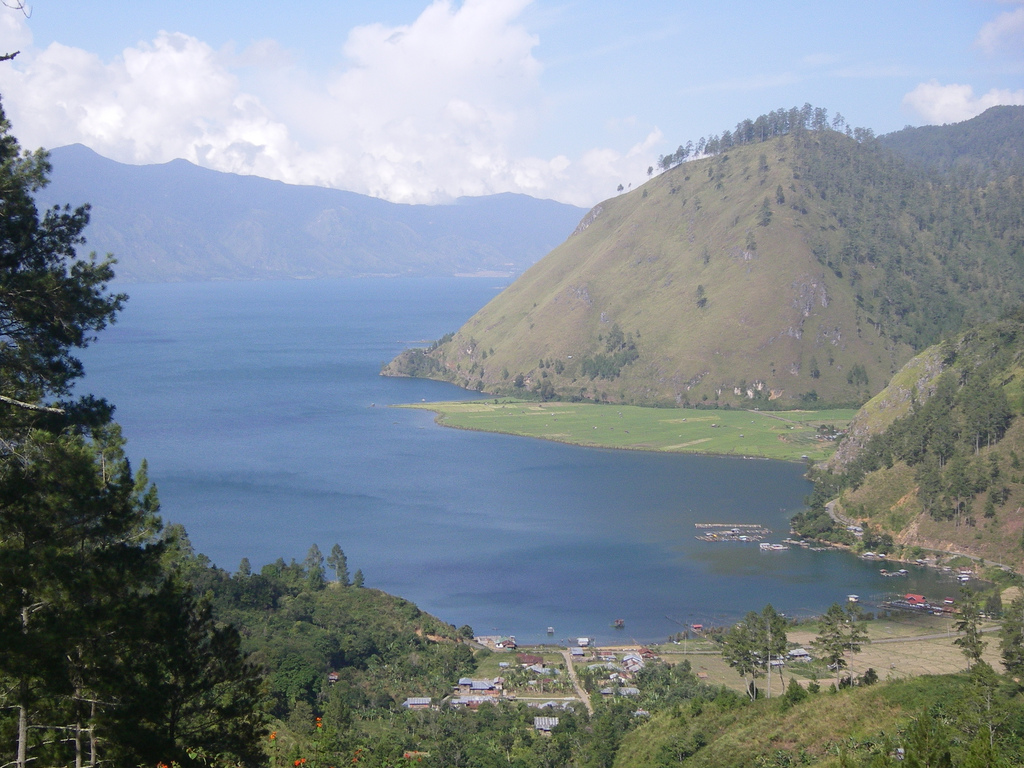
Lake Laut Tawar in Central Aceh Regency

Aceh has many tourist destinations, especially natural, historical and cultural tourism. With a fairly long coastline, several archipelagos, and a large forest area, Aceh offers many tourism options, one of the famous natural attractions in Aceh is other famous natural attractions are mountainous areas such as in Tangse and the Gayo Highlands, Ulu Masen Nature Reserve, Gunung Leuser National Park and Rawa Singkil Wildlife Reserve, Lake Laut Tawar, Sabang and Rondo Island. while for historical and cultural tourism, Aceh also has several favorite destinations for tourists, including the Aceh Tsunami Museum, Aceh Museum, Museum Samudra Pasai, Gunongan Historical Park and Baiturahman Mosque.

== Culture ==
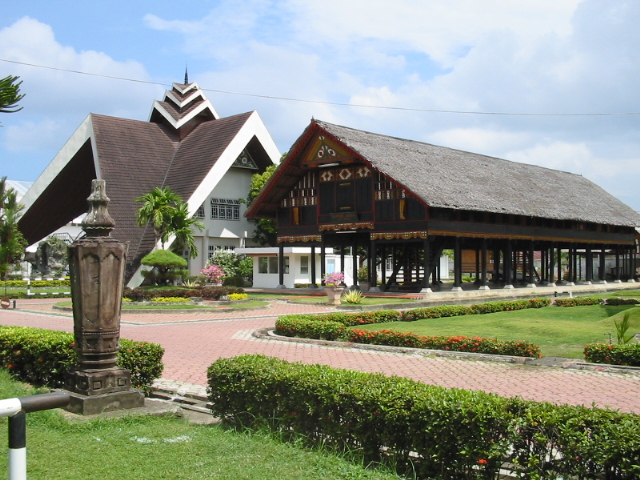
Aceh Museum is the oldest museum in Aceh, built during the Dutch colonial era

Aceh has a variety of distinctive arts and culture.

=== Traditional weapon ===
- Rencong is a type of dagger, a traditional weapon of the Acehnese people. The shape resembles the letter L, and when viewed more closely the form is bismillah calligraphy.

In addition to rencong, the Acehnese people also possessed several other special weapons, such as sikin panyang, peurise awe, peurise teumaga, siwah, geuliwang and peudeueng.

=== Traditional house ===
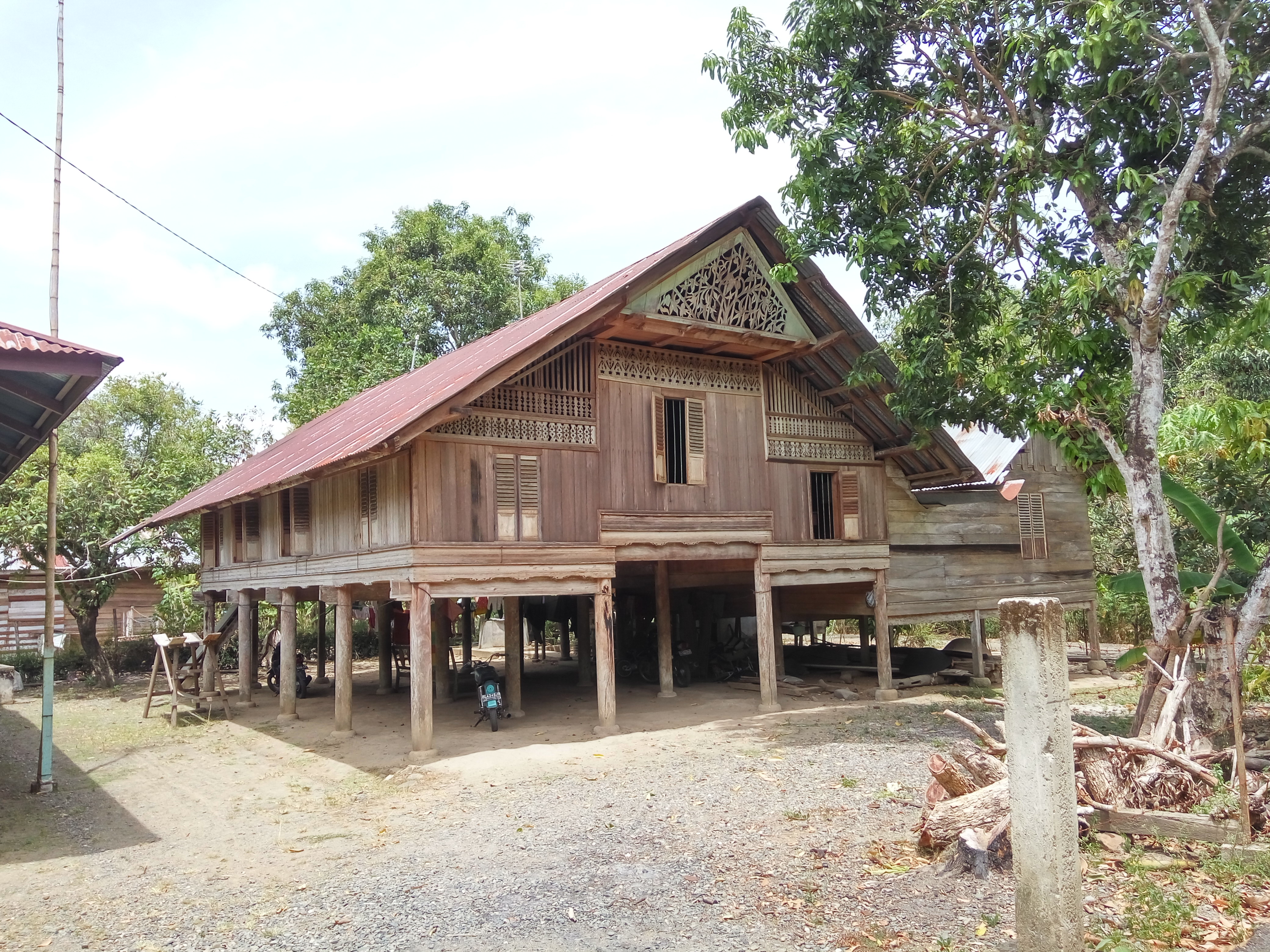
Rumoh Aceh, traditional house of Aceh

Aceh's traditional house is called Rumoh Aceh. This house is a type of house on stilts with three main parts and one additional section. The three main parts of the Aceh house are the seuramoë keuë (front porch), seuramoë teungoh (middle porch) and seuramoë likôt (back porch). Another additional part is the rumoh dapu (kitchen house).

=== Dance ===
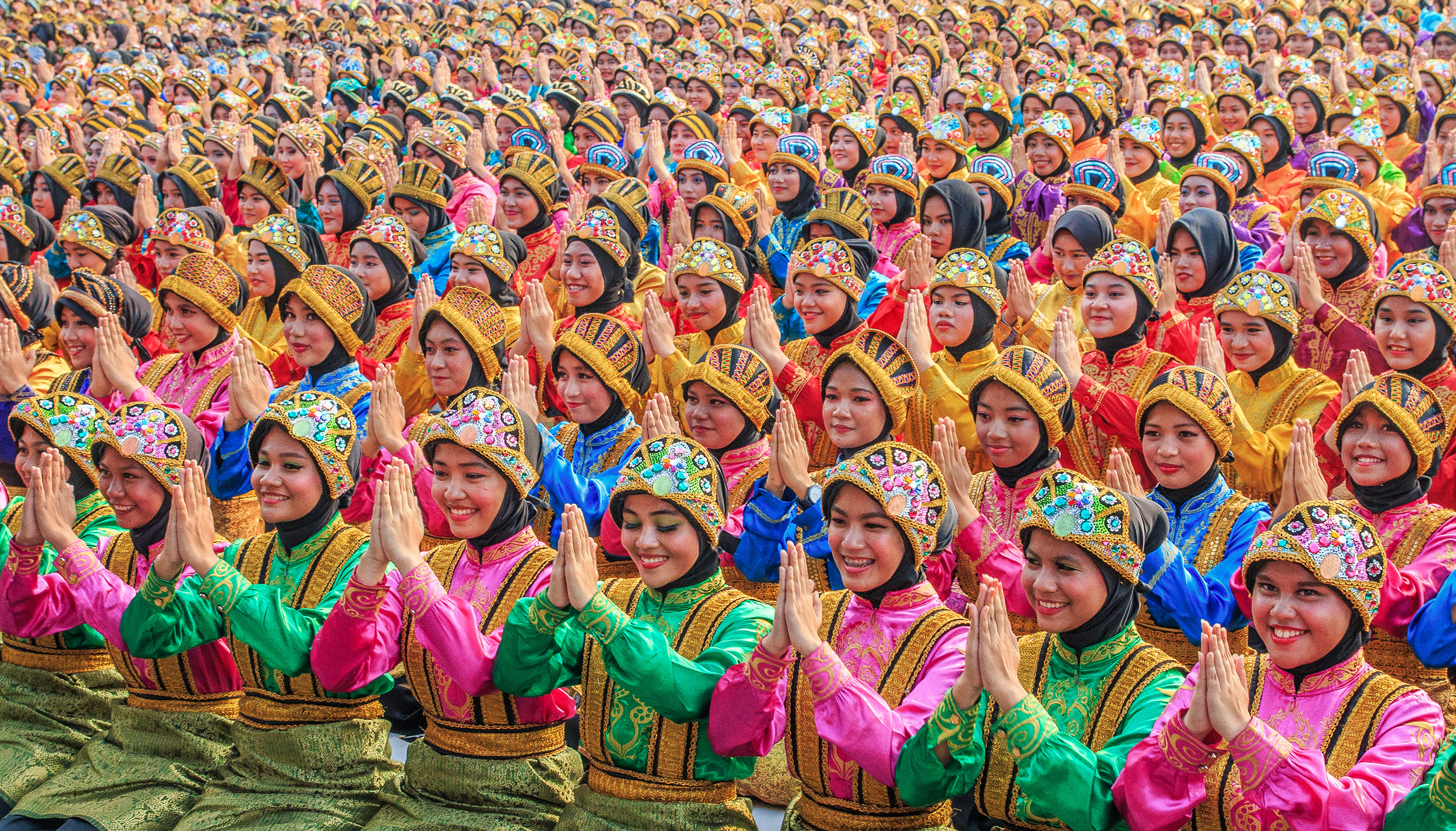
Ratoh Jaroe dance performance

Traditional Acehnese dances illustrate traditional heritage, religion, and local folklore. Acehnese dances are generally performed in groups, in which a group of dancers are of the same sex, and there are standing or sitting positions. When viewed from the accompanying music, the dances can be grouped into two types; namely accompanied by the vocal and percussion of the dancer's own body, and accompanied by an ensemble of musical instruments. Some dances that are famous at the national and even world level are dances originating from Aceh, such as the Rateb Meuseukat Dance and the Saman dance.

=== Cuisine ===
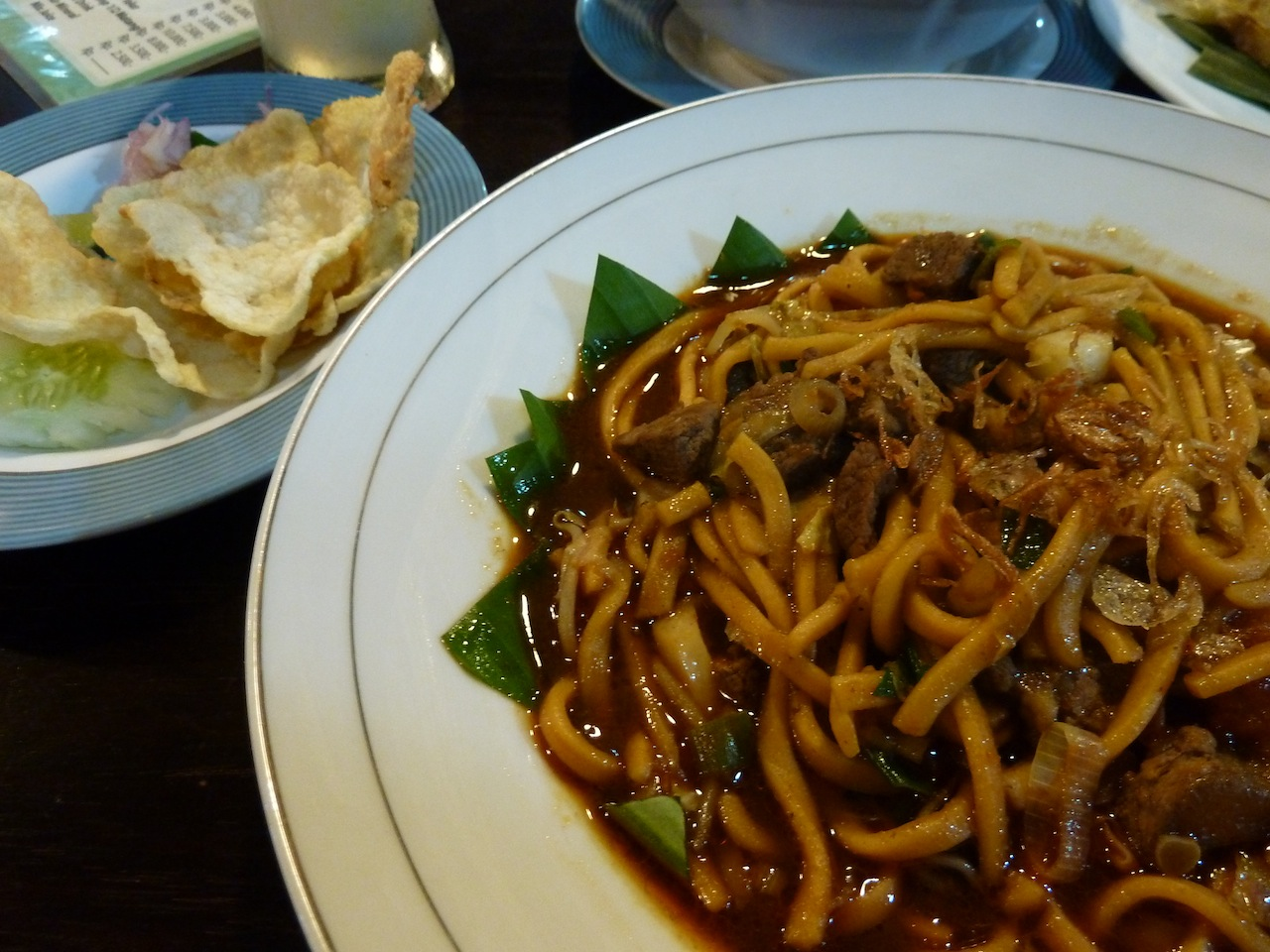
Mie aceh

Acehnese cuisine uses combinations of spices found in Indian and Arabic cuisine, include ginger, pepper, coriander, cumin, cloves, cinnamon, cardamom, and fennel. A variety of Acehnese foods are cooked with curry or curry spices and coconut milk, which are generally combined with meat, such as buffalo meat, beef, lamb, fish and chicken. Certain recipes have traditionally used cannabis as a seasoning; which is also found in some other Southeast Asian dishes such as in Laos, but now the material is no longer used. Dishes native to Aceh include nasi gurih, mie aceh, mie caluk and timphan.

=== Literature ===
Aceh has a tradition of oral literature, such as the folktales The king of the parakeets and Banta Berensyah.

The oldest Acehnese manuscripts that can be found are from 1069 H (1658/1659 AD), namely Hikayat Seuma'un.

Before Dutch colonialism (1873–1942), almost all Acehnese literature was in the form of poetry known as Hikayat. Very little is in the form of prose and one of them is the Book of Bakeu Meunan which is a translation of the book Qawaa'id al-Islaam.

It was only after the arrival of the Dutch that Acehnese writings appeared in the form of prose, in the 1930s, such as Lhee Saboh Nang written by Aboe Bakar and De Vries. It was only afterward that various forms of prose appeared, but still remained dominated by the form of Hikayat.

== Transportation ==
The 74-km Sigli–Banda Aceh Toll Road is currently under construction, as a part of the Trans-Sumatra Toll Road.

Railways in Aceh has started since the Dutch colonial era. In 1876 the Royal Netherlands East Indies Army (KNIL) started to build a 750-mm gauge railways known as Atjeh Tram, which began operating from 1882 to 1942 and later changed its name to Atjeh Staatsspoorwegen (ASS) in 1916. Its railways assets, now mostly inactive, is under the ownership of the Regional Division I North Sumatra and Aceh of Kereta Api Indonesia. Cut Meutia (train) is a train that serves Krueng Geukueh to Krueng Mane in North Aceh Regency.

Airports in Aceh include Sultan Iskandar Muda International Airport in Aceh Besar Regency (serving Banda Aceh and surrounding areas) and Maimun Saleh Airport in Sabang.

== See also ==
- List of people from Aceh
- Acehnese local government system
- Other world's major polities that have applied Sharia law:
  - Azerbaijan
  - Brunei
  - Chechnya
  - Malaysia
