= Daud Beureueh =

Indonesian politician

Major General (Tit.) Teungku Mohammad Daud Beureu’éh
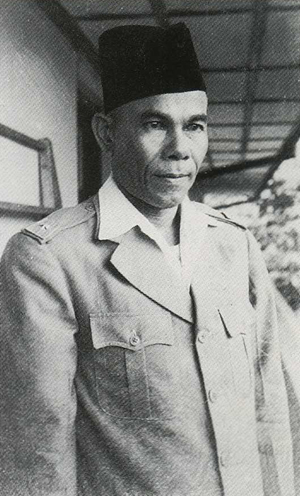
- Born: 17 September 1899; Pidie, Aceh Sultanate
- Died: 10 June 1987 (aged 87); Banda Aceh, Indonesia
- Spouses: Cut Halimah; Hajjah Asma
- Military career
- Allegiance: Persatuan Ulama Seluruh Aceh (PUSA); Negara Islam Indonesia
- Rank: Major General (titular)
- Conflicts: Indonesian National Revolution; Cumbok affair; Darul Islam rebellion

Teungku Mohammad Daud Beureueh (Note: Indonesian: [ˈtəŋku muˈhamat ˈdaud bərəˈʔɛh]; Acehnese: Teungku Mohammad Daud Beureu’éh Acehnese pronunciation: [tɯŋku muhammad daud bɯrɯʔɛ̃h]) (17 September 1899 – 10 June 1987) was an Indonesian military Governor of Aceh (1945–1953) and leader of the Free Aceh Movement rebellion in the province (1953–1963).

Born in the Keumangan chiefdom of Pidie regency, he began in 1930 to champion a more modern form of Islamic school and became a popular reformist preacher. In 1939 he established and led the Persatuan Ulama Seluruh Aceh (PUSA), or All Aceh Islamic Scholars Association. PUSA was not initially anti-Dutch but emerged as the principal critic of the Dutch-supported hierarchy of ulèebalang (aristocrat-officials). Its members contacted the Japanese before their 1942 invasion, in the hope of overturning ulèebalang rule as a reward for their support. As the Japanese saw a greater need for popular support in 1944, they transferred many judicial functions from the ulèebalang to religious courts headed by Daud. After the Japanese surrender, this conflict between religious and secular elites became violent, leading to the eclipse of the ulèebalang and the killing of many in the Cumbok affair of December 1945/January 1946. Daud was thereafter the most influential figure in Aceh, and his support for the Indonesian Republic's struggle against the returning Dutch helped make Aceh a bastion of the Republican cause. He was recognised as Military Governor in 1947, and Governor once independence was won in 1950.

His consistency towards the enforcement of Islamic law started from the da'wah in his youth, until the beginning of the revolution. On one occasion with Teuku Nyak Arief, he gave the view that Indonesia should be governed under Islamic law. However, Teuku Nyak Arief refused, explaining the diversity that existed in the forerunner of Indonesia. That determination did not subside until President Sukarno met with Teungku Daud Beureueh in his goodwill in June 1948. He advised that after the war of independence Aceh was given the freedom to practice Islamic law, and Sukarno agreed, although his reference to Islamic law was that Aceh was allowed to enact "Islamic family law" and not criminal ones. However, in 1953, Sukarno changed his mind and opposed Aceh's plan to enact Islamic law, stating that "Indonesia is a nation state with the ideology of Pancasila, not a theocratic country with a certain religious orientation" and emphasized that Aceh's plan to enact Islamic laws contradict the secular Indonesian legislature.

He and his supporters were alienated from Jakarta thereafter. Daud was sidelined in favour of Western-educated leaders in 1951 when Aceh was merged into a larger Province of North Sumatra with a substantial Christian (Batak) minority. Supported by former PUSA members and much of the military, he led a rebellion against Jakarta in September 1953, declaring that Aceh would join the insurgent Free Aceh Movement (Negara Aceh Darusalam) formed earlier in Java by Kartosuwiryo. Jakarta quickly retook the cities, but resistance was widespread until 1959 when many supporters demanded Aceh be a "Special Region" with the right to enact Islamic laws. Daud himself did not return from his guerrilla base until 1962, however, when he was given an amnesty but remained very critical.

After the appearance of the Free Aceh Movement (GAM) in 1978, Beureueh was arrested and held under house arrest in Jakarta until he died in 1987.

== Bibliography ==
- Siegel, James (1969). The Rope of God. United States: University of California Press. ISBN 978-0520037144.
- Reid, Anthony (1979). The Blood of the People: Revolution and the End of Traditional Rule in Northern Sumatra. Singapore: Singapore University Press. ISBN 997-1696371.
- Reid, Anthony (2005). An Indonesian Frontier: Acehnese & Other Histories of Sumatra. Singapore: Singapore University Press. ISBN 9971-69-298-8.
- "Teungku Muhammad Daud Beureueh" (in Indonesian). Ministry of Education, Culture, Research, and Technology. 2024.
- Ilham, Muhammad (2016). Peran Tuhan Muhammad . Daud Pemberontakan 1953-1962 [The Role Of The Lord Muhammad David: The Rebellion 1953–1962] (PDF) (Thesis) (in Acehnese). Syarif Hidayatullah State Islamic University Jakarta.
