= Ulèebalang =

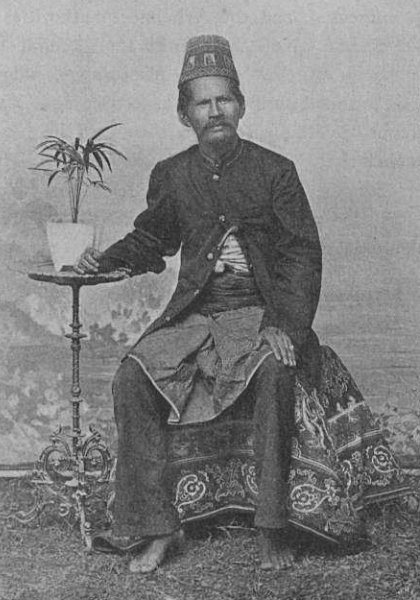
A photo of Teuku Cut Amat Tungkop, the ulèebalang of Tungkop mukim in West Aceh.

Ulèebalang (Note: /uːleɪɛbʌˈlʌŋ/ oo-lay-buh-LUNG; Indonesian: [ulɛbaˈlaŋ]; Acehnese: [ulɛə̯baˈlaŋ] Husaini: ulèëbalang, Jawoe: اولوبالڠ) (also spelt as ulèe balang) were a class of par excellence Acehnese feudal lords who held military power under the rule of the Aceh Sultanate from the 16th century to the 19th century. They were appointed and is subordinate to the sultan of Aceh to govern several traditional regions, known historically as mukim or sagoe (modern day Indonesian kabupaten or regency). The term ulèebalang etymologically translates to 'head of the army' or 'warlord' and is often translated as such, where ulèe means 'head' or 'leader' and balang means 'army', but culturally, it's better translated as 'king' or 'chief'. Ulèebalang is derived from the Malay rank hulubalang.

== Establishment and function ==
Iskandar Muda first established the title ulèebalang in the 17th century as a mean to exercise further control over his regions, they were granted land and people to govern over, which ranges from 500 to over 50,000 people, where they are given autonomy yet must still be subordinate to the sultan of Aceh. Their families are also given the title teuku for males and cut for females. As there is no exact Acehnese term for the land that they reign other than nanggroe (state), the term oelèebalangschap (ulèebalangship) is used by the Dutch to refer to these regions. Ulèebalangs are in charge of their respective region's administration, traditional laws, defence, public relations, as well as the taxation in the land, known as wasèe, though power ultimately comes from the sultan.

To aid in their governance, ulèebalangs may appoint three classes of apparatus: banta, rakan, and kali. Bantas are the younger brothers or distant relative of the ulèebalangs, they act as the ulèebalang's right hand man, akin to the Javanese patih. Rakans are the companions or guards of the ulèebalangs. Kalis or kadhis are the people appointed by the ulèebalang to administer the region's justice and law, which is limited to familial, religious, and traditional jurisdiction.

== Under Dutch rule ==
After the reign of Iskandar Muda, the ulèebalangs often supported weaker sultans in order to maintain their own autonomy. Over time, the ulèebalangs gained significant power, which lands them in the three major elites of the sultanate: the sultan, the ulèebalang, and the ulama. Several rich ulèebalang also owns pepper and rice cultivations, which they force the population to work in corvée labor.

As the sultanate weaken, several ulèebalangs renounced their fealty to the sultan, which amplified during the reign of the Dutch East Indies nearby who seeks to take down the sultanate through divide and conquer, as some ulèebalangs even sign a short proclamation (korte verklaring) to swear fealty to the Dutch and aid in their administration in the newly conquered land. This angers the Acehnese population who were mostly anti-Dutch, as they side more with the ulamas who actively fights against Dutch influence and rule, as they see the ulèebalangs as traitors.

== Post-independence and aftermath ==
After the weakening of Dutch power, the ulèebalangs' support and power amongst the populace significantly declined, as the public increasingly trusted the ulama to resolve social issues rather than the untrustworthy feudal elite. The strain between the pro-Dutch rule ulèebalangs and the pro-Indonesia ulamas, who had united into the All-Aceh Ulama Association (PUSA) come to a boiling point on November 1945, and later, the Cumbok affair, as the ulèebalangs, led by Teuku Keumangan Umar, terrorise the local populace in an effort to stall and resist the independence movement. The Cumbok affair solidified the fall of the ulèebalangs dominance in Aceh, as they're seen as irrelevant and traitors, many of these prominent figures and their families were arrested, exiled, or lost their political influence.

== See also ==
- Hulubalang
