= List of regencies and cities in Aceh =

This is a list of regencies and cities in Aceh province. As of October 2019, there were 18 regencies and 5 cities.

| # | Regency / City | Capital | Regent/ Mayor | Area (km^{2}) | Population (2019) | No. of Districts | Kelurahan (urban village) / Gampong (village) | Logo | Location map |
|---|---|---|---|---|---|---|---|---|---|
| 1 | Aceh Barat Regency | Meulaboh | Ramli MS | 2,927.95 | 194,712 | 12 | -/322 | | |
| 2 | Aceh Barat Daya Regency | Blangpidie | Akmal Ibrahim | 1,490.60 | 151,474 | 9 | -/152 | | |
| 3 | Aceh Besar Regency | Jantho | Mawardi Ali | 2,969.00 | 390,037 | 23 | -/604 | | |
| 4 | Aceh Jaya Regency | Calang | Teuku Irfan Bahrum | 3,812.99 | 90,624 | 9 | -/172 | | |
| 5 | Aceh Selatan Regency | Tapaktuan | Tgk. Amran | 3,841.60 | 234,761 | 18 | -/260 | | |
| 6 | Aceh Singkil Regency | Singkil | Dulmusrid | 2,185.00 | 126,768 | 11 | -/116 | | |
| 7 | Aceh Tamiang Regency | Karang Baru | Mursil | 1,956.72 | 294,350 | 12 | -/213 | | |
| 8 | Aceh Tengah Regency | Takengon | Shabela Abubakar | 4,318.39 | 213,056 | 14 | -/295 | | |
| 9 | Aceh Tenggara Regency | Kutacane | Raidin Pinim | 4,231.43 | 225,139 | 16 | -/385 | | |
| 10 | Aceh Timur Regency | Idi Rayeuk | Hasballah M. Thaib | 6,286.01 | 429,006 | 24 | -/513 | | |
| 11 | Aceh Utara Regency | Lhoksukon | Muhammad Thaib | 3,236.86 | 583,350 | 27 | -/852 | | |
| 12 | Bener Meriah Regency | Simpang Tiga Redelong | Tgk. Syarkawi | 1,454.09 | 159,636 | 10 | -/232 | | |
| 13 | Bireuen Regency | Bireuen | Muzakkar A. Gani | 1,901.20 | 438,615 | 17 | -/609 | | |
| 14 | Gayo Lues Regency | Blang Kejeren | Muhammad Amru | 5,719.58 | 99,937 | 11 | -/136 | | |
| 15 | Nagan Raya Regency | Suka Makmue | Muhammad Jamin Idham | 3,363.72 | 170,207 | 10 | -/222 | | |
| 16 | Pidie Regency | Sigli | Roni Ahmad | 3,086.95 | 437,740 | 23 | -/730 | | |
| 17 | Pidie Jaya Regency | Meureudu | Aiyub Abbas | 1,073.60 | 160,115 | 8 | -/222 | | |
| 18 | Simeulue Regency | Sinabang | Erli Hasim | 2,051.48 | 92,977 | 10 | -/138 | | |
| 19 | Banda Aceh | - | Aminullah Usman | 61.36 | 244,689 | 9 | -/90 | | |
| 20 | Langsa | - | Usman Abdullah | 262.41 | 186,432 | 5 | -/66 | | |
| 21 | Lhokseumawe | - | Suaidi Yahya | 181.06 | 193,395 | 4 | -/68 | | |
| 22 | Sabang | - | Nazaruddin | 153.00 | 42,015 | 2 | -/18 | | |
| 23 | Subulussalam | - | Affan Alfian Bintang | 1,391.00 | 85,731 | 5 | -/82 | | |
