= List of incumbent regional heads and deputy regional heads in Aceh =

The following is an article about the list of Regional Heads and Deputy Regional Heads in 23 regencies/cities in Aceh who are currently still serving.

== List ==
Regency/ City	Photo of the Regent/ Mayor	Regent/ Mayor	Photo of Deputy Regent/ Mayor	Deputy Regent/ Mayor	Taking Office	End of Office (Planned)	Ref.
West Aceh; Regency List of Regents/Deputy Regents		Tarmizi		Said Fadheil	19 February 2025	19 February 2030	
Southwest Aceh; Regency List of Regents/Deputy Regents		Safaruddin		Zaman Akli	16 February 2025	16 February 2030	
Aceh Besar; Regency List of Regents/Deputy Regents		Muharram Idris		Syukri A. Jalil	13 February 2025	13 February 2030	
Aceh Jaya; Regency List of Regents/Deputy Regents		Safwandi		Muslem D.	19 February 2025	19 February 2030	
South Aceh; Regency List of Regents/Deputy Regents	pus	Mirwan M. S.	pus	Baital Mukadis	17 February 2025	17 February 2030	
Aceh Singkil; Regency List of Regents/Deputy Regents		Safriadi Manik		Hamzah Sulaiman	15 February 2025	15 February 2030	
Aceh Tamiang; Regency List of Regents/Deputy Regents		Armia Fahmi		Ismail	17 February 2025	17 February 2030	
Central Aceh; Regency List of Regents/Deputy Regents	pus	Haili Yoga	pus	Muchsin Hasan	18 February 2025	18 February 2030	
Southeast Aceh; Regency List of Regents/Deputy Regents	pus	Muhammad Salim Fakhry	pus	Heri Al Hilal	16 February 2025	16 February 2030	
East Aceh; Regency List of Regents/Deputy Regents	pus	Iskandar Usman Al-Farlaky	pus	Teuku Zainal Abidin	19 March 2025	19 March 2030	
North Aceh; Regency List of Regents/Deputy Regents	pus	Ismail A. Jalil	pus	Tarmizi (Panyang)	17 February 2025	17 February 2030	
Bener Meriah; Regency List of Regents/Deputy Regents	pus	Tagore Abubakar	pus	Armia	18 February 2025	18 February 2030	
Bireuen; Regency List of Regents/Deputy Regents	pus	Mukhlis	pus	Razuardi Ibrahim	18 February 2025	18 February 2030	
Gayo Lues; Regency List of Regents/Deputy Regents	pus	Suhaidi	pus	Maliki	16 February 2025	16 February 2030	
Nagan Raya; Regency List of Regents/Deputy Regents		Teuku Raja Keumangan		Raja Sayang	19 February 2025	19 February 2030	
Pidie; Regency List of Regents/Deputy Regents	pus	Sarjani Abdullah	pus	Alzaizi	18 February 2025	18 February 2030	
Pidie Jaya; Regency List of Regents/Deputy Regents	pus	Sibral Malasyi	pus	Hasan Basri	18 February 2025	18 February 2030	
Simeulue; Regency List of Regents/Deputy Regents	pus	Muhammad Nasrun Mikaris	pus	Nusar Amin	8 March 2025	8 March 2030	
Banda Aceh; City List of Mayors/Deputy mayors	pus	Illiza Sa'aduddin Djamal	pus	Afdhal Khalilullah	12 February 2025	12 February 2030	
Langsa; City List of Mayors/Deputy mayors	pus	Jeffry Sentana Putra	pus	Muhammad Haikal Alfisyahrin	23 May 2025	23 May 2030	
Lhokseumawe; City List of Mayors/Deputy mayors	pus	Sayuti Abubakar	pus	Husaini	17 February 2025	17 February 2030	
Sabang; City List of Mayors/Deputy mayors	pus	Zulkifli H. Adam	pus	Suradji Junus	14 June 2025	14 June 2030	
Subulussalam; City List of Mayors/Deputy mayors	pus	M. Rasyid Bancin	pus	M. Nasir Kombih	15 February 2025	15 February 2030	

Notes

- "Commencement of office" is the inauguration date at the beginning or during the current term of office. For acting regents/mayors, it is the date of appointment or extension as acting regent/mayor.

== See also ==
- Aceh
