= Cut Nyak Dhien Airport =

Airport in Nagan Raya, Aceh, Indonesia

Cut Nyak Dhien Airport Bandar Udara Cut Nyak Dhien
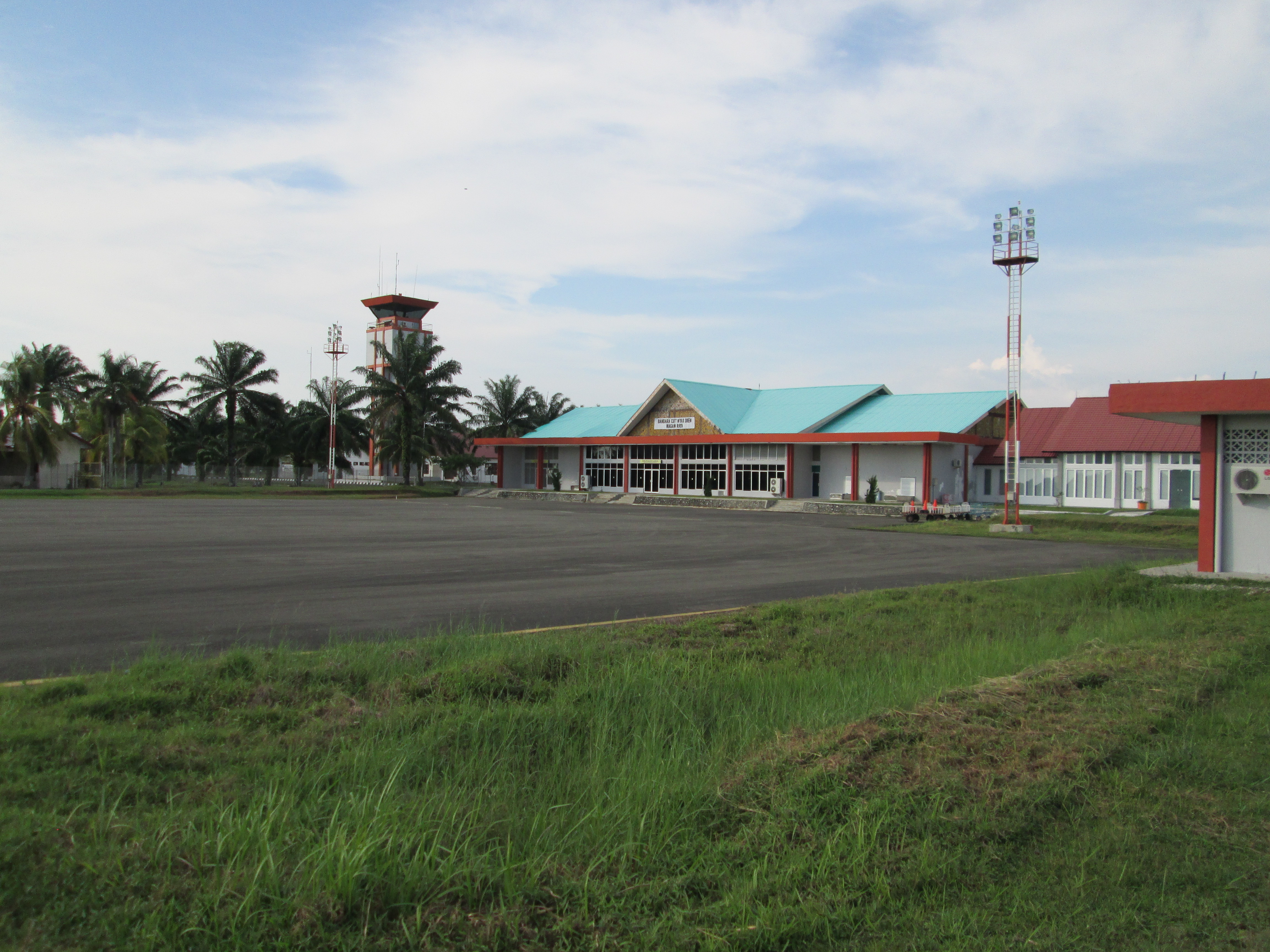
- Cut Nyak Dhien Airport
- IATA: MEQ; ICAO: WITC

Summary
- Airport type: Public
- Location: Nagan Raya Regency
- Time zone: WIB (UTC+07:00)
- Elevation AMSL: 6 ft (1.8 m)
- Coordinates: 04°02′37.38″N 96°15′03.01″E
- Website: meq.informasibandara.org

Map
- Location in Aceh, Northern Sumatra, Sumatra and Indonesia MEQ (Northern Sumatra) MEQ (Sumatra) MEQ (Indonesia)

Runways
| Direction | Length | | Surface |
| Direction | ft | m | Surface |
|---|---|---|---|
| 14/32 | 5,905 | 1,800 | Asphalt |

Cut Nyak Dhien Airport (IATA: MEQ, ICAO: WITC) is an airport located in Nagan Raya Regency, Aceh, Indonesia.

The airport is located 26 km (16 mi) from Suka Makmue, 46 km (29 mi) from Meulaboh, West Aceh Regency, and 347 km (216 mi) from the city of Banda Aceh.

The airport serves both Suka Makmue, the capital of the Nagan Raya Regency and Meulaboh, the capital of West Aceh Regency.

== Name ==
The airport is named after Cut Nyak Dhien (1848–1908), the woman who led the Acehnese guerrilla forces during the Aceh War against the Dutch for 25 years, and was awarded the title of National Hero of Indonesia in 1964.

== Airlines and destinations ==
| Airlines | Destinations |
|---|---|
| Susi Air | Medan, Banda Aceh, Simeulue, Singkil |
| Wings Air | Medan |

== Statistics ==
Frequency of flights at Cut Nyak Dien Airport
| Rank | Destinations | Frequency (weekly) | Airline(s) |
|---|---|---|---|
| 1 | Medan, North Sumatra | 7 | Wings Air |
| 2 | Banda Aceh, Aceh | 4 | Susi Air |
| 3 | Simeulue, Aceh | 1 | Susi Air |
| 4 | Singkil, Aceh | 1 | Susi Air |

== See also ==
- List of airports in Indonesia
