= Husin Yusuf =

Indonesian politician and militant (born 1955)

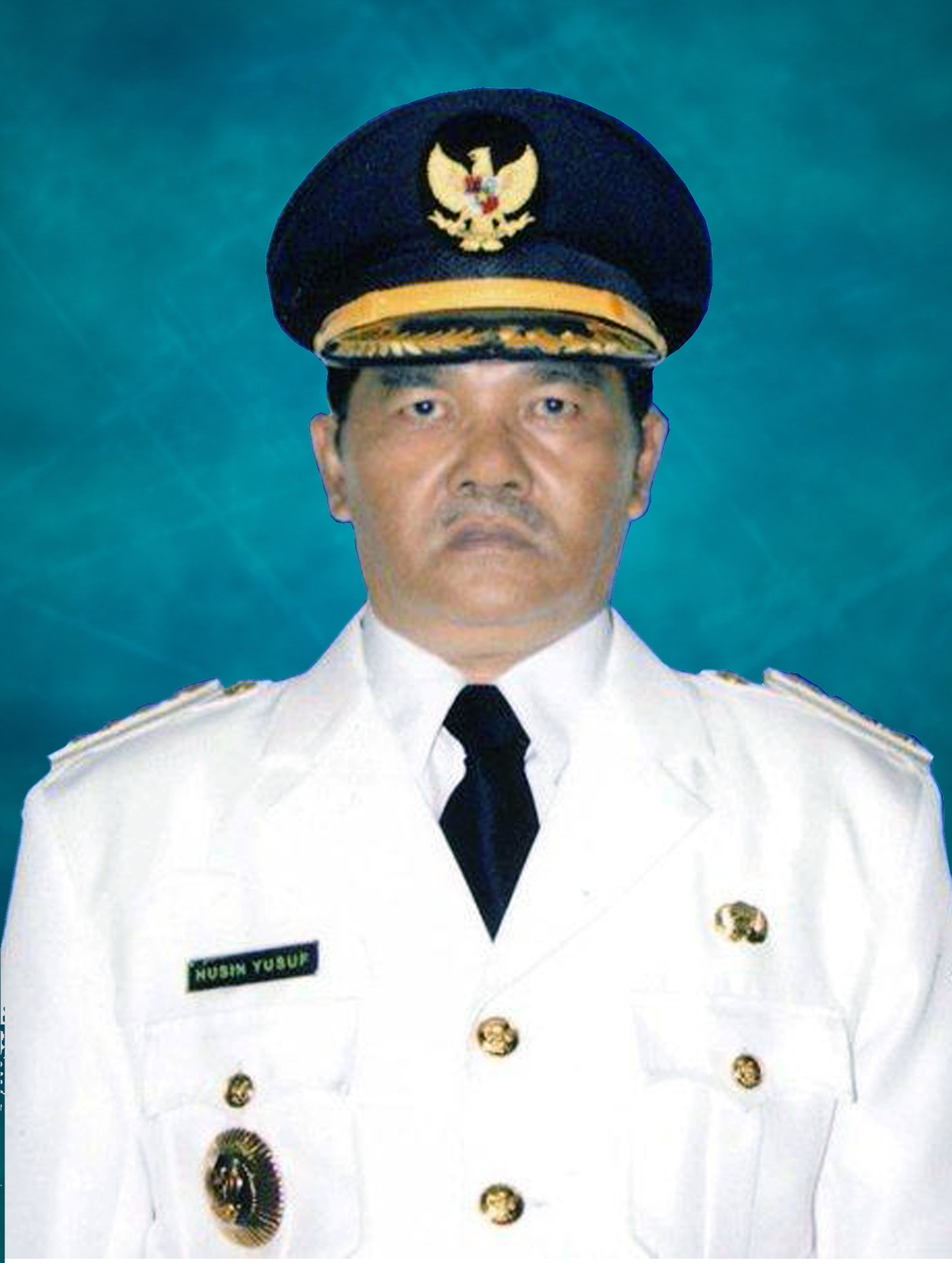
- Yusuf as regent

Regent of South Aceh
- In office 10 March 2008 – 10 March 2013
- Preceded by: Teuku Machsalmina Ali
- Succeeded by: Teuku Sama Indra

Personal details
- Born: 25 June 1955 (age 70) South Aceh, Aceh, Indonesia
- Party: Aceh Party

Teungku Husin Yusuf (born 25 June 1955) is an Indonesian politician and a former militant of the Free Aceh Movement. He served as the regent of South Aceh Regency between 2008 and 2013.

== Early life ==
Husin Yusuf was born on 25 June 1955 in the village of Ruak, in South Aceh Regency. After completing middle school at a madrasa equivalent, he began to study to become a religious studies teacher, completing a course in 1975. At some point, he joined the Free Aceh Movement as a militant. Within GAM, he was active in the vicinity of Tapaktuan, i.e. in South Aceh.

== Career ==
In 2007–2008, Yusuf took part in the inaugural regency election for South Aceh Regency. After a first round where thirteen pairs of candidates took part, Yusuf defeated civil servant Azwir in the runoff after securing 54,921 votes (54.3%).

In August 2009, Yusuf attended the Aceh Cultural Fair in Banda Aceh where individual regencies set up their own stands. President Susilo Bambang Yudhoyono attended the event, and was scheduled to visit South Aceh's stand but skipped it due to a mistake by the protocol officer. Yusuf, who was at the stand wearing South Aceh's traditional clothing, removed his outfit and departed the event in anger while repeatedly stating his disappointment. A group of South Aceh students later held a protest against Acehnese governor Irwandi Yusuf over the incident. As regent, Yusuf also issued a controversial bylaw prohibiting municipal employees from having beards. Yusuf justified the ban by stating that South Aceh "was part of Indonesia, not Iran".

Although he considered running for reelection in the 2012 regency election, he ultimately did not participate. His tenure expired on 10 March 2013, and he was succeeded as regent by Teuku Sama Indra.

=== Post-regency ===
After the end of his term, Yusuf ran for a seat in the House of Representatives as a National Awakening Party candidate. He was not elected. In 2018, he made an attempt to run for a second term as regent as an independent candidate, placing fourth out of seven candidates with 5,799 votes (4.4%).

In 2024, he led the campaign team for regent candidate Amran.
