= Azwir =

Indonesian politician (1956–2019)

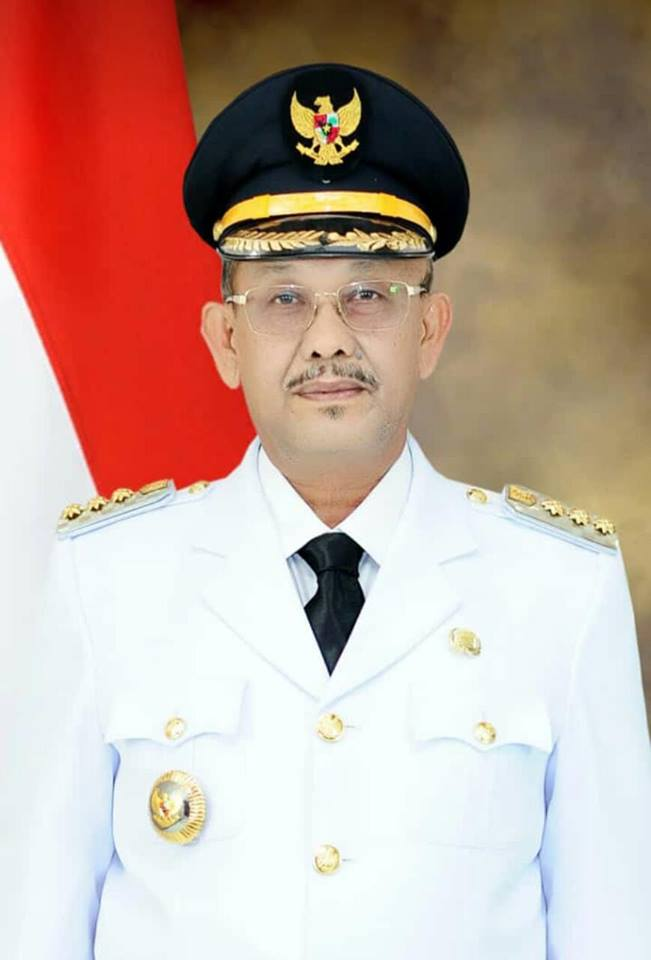
- Portrait as regent

Regent of South Aceh
- In office 27 September 2018 – 2 December 2019
- Preceded by: Teuku Sama Indra
- Succeeded by: Amran

Personal details
- Born: 23 July 1956 Meukek, South Aceh, Indonesia
- Died: 2 December 2019 (aged 63) Singapore

Azwir (23 July 1956 – 2 December 2019) was an Indonesian politician and civil servant. He served as the regent of South Aceh Regency for a year between September 2018 and his death in December 2019, and briefly in 2012 as acting regent of Nagan Raya Regency. He previously worked within the municipal governments of South Aceh and Subulussalam.

== Early life ==
Azwir was born on 23 July 1956 at the village of Kutabuloh II, in Meukek district of South Aceh Regency. He completed primary school in Meukek in 1970, and enrolled at an economics middle school in Blangpidie where he graduated in 1973. He then studied at an economics high school at the provincial capital in Banda Aceh, graduating in 1976 before enrolling at the Academy of Home Affairs Governance in Banda Aceh. He received his diploma in 1982. He also received a degree in social science in 1999 from the Indonesian Community Building University in Medan.

== Career ==
Azwir joined the civil service after graduating with his diploma. During the 1990s, he held the position of district head of Bakongan and Trumon in South Aceh, along with being appointed as director at a municipally-owned corporation. Between 2003 and 2006, he was head of South Aceh's municipal transport department. In 2006, he was reassigned to the municipal government of the city of Subulussalam. While in Subulussalam, he unsuccessfully ran in the regency election for South Aceh in 2008, losing to Husin Yusuf. In 2012, he was appointed as acting regent of Nagan Raya Regency. He held this post for around six months, and the regency's 2012 election was held during his tenure. He continued to work in Subulussalam's city government until 2016.

In 2018, Azwir ran again in the regency election of South Aceh with former Free Aceh Movement militant leader Amran as his running mate. The pair received the support of PNA, PDI-P, PKB, Hanura, and PDA. Azwir and Amran would win the election with 46,667 votes (35.8%), defeating six other pairs of candidates. Azwir and Amran were sworn in on 27 September 2018.

During his tenure as regent, Azwir initiated a program providing compensation to the families of dead residents. He also formed a special task force for accelerating development, which was to serve throughout his five-year term. He further instructed the municipal government departments to lay off all temporary staff to reduce spending, and only rehire them as needed.

=== Death ===
On 2 December 2019, Azwir died at the National University Hospital of Singapore. He had been there for a medical checkup. He was buried the following day at the Gampong Hilir Public Cemetery in Tapaktuan, South Aceh.

== Personal life ==
Azwir was married to Jafnimar Jakfar, and the couple has one children.
