= State Islamic Institute of Teungku Dirundeng Meulaboh =

Public university in Aceh, Indonesia

- STAIN Teungku Dirundeng Meulaboh
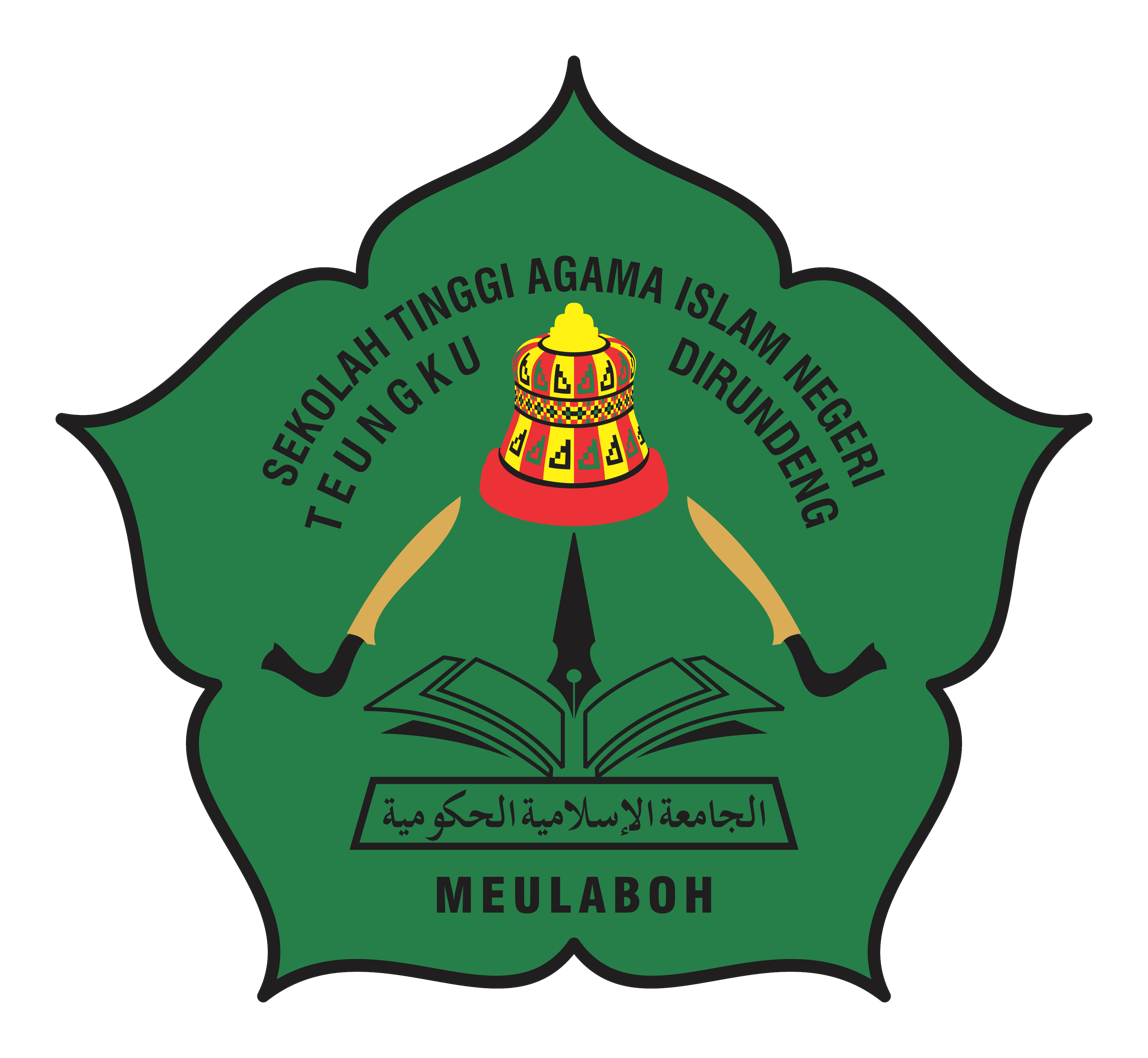
- Motto: Keikhlasan | Inovatif | Berakhlak Mulia
- Type: Public Islamic University
- Established: 17 December 1986 (as Teaching Faculty of Teungku Dirundeng Foundation) | 19 September 2014 (as State Islamic Institute)
- Parent institution: Ministry of Religious Affairs (Indonesia)
- Chairperson: Syamsuar
- Location: Aceh Barat, Meulaboh, Aceh, Indonesia; 4.1377°N 96.2033°E
- Campus: Rural
- Website: staindirundeng.ac.id

State Islamic Institute of Teungku Dirundeng Meulaboh (Indonesian: STAIN Teungku Dirundeng Meulaboh, abbreviated STAIN TDM) is an Indonesian Islamic public university in Meulaboh, West Aceh Regency.

== Name ==
The institution is named after a renowned local Acehnese scholar and freedom fighter against Dutch colonisation in Meulaboh, Teuku Teungku Hasballah, famously known as "Teungku Chick Dirundeng". He established a Dayah (local Acehnese centre of Islamic education) in Rundeng Tuha (now it is located in Rundeng, Johan Pahlawan). When Meulaboh fell to the hands of the Dutch colonial government, he was martyred alongside Teuku Umar Djohan (another local Acehnese freedom fighter). Unfortunately, there were no records of his burial or grave.

== History ==
The institution was originally Tarbiyah Faculty in Meulaboh. It was renamed to Sekolah Tinggi Ilmu Tarbiyah (Institute for Islamic Teaching), in 1990. It was renamed once more time in 2004 as Sekolah Tinggi Agama Islam (Institute for Islamic Studies), which is marked by the addition of 2 undergraduate programs, that is Islamic Communication and Broadcasting and Undergraduate Program in Sharia Economic Law.

On September 19, 2014, it was officially integrated by the Ministry of Religious Affairs and became a public Islamic university (Perguruan Tinggi Keagamaan Islam Negeri), the fourth in the province (after Ar-Raniry University in Banda Aceh, IAIN Lhokseumawe in Lhokseumawe, IAIN Langsa in Langsa and IAIN Takengon in Takengon) and the first in the southwest.

Dr. Syamsuar was the chairperson from 2015 to 2019, appointed by the Minister of Religious Affairs Lukman Hakim Syaifuddin on January 7, 2015. On January 7, 2019, Syaifuddin sworn in Dr. Inayatillah as the chairperson.

In June 2021, the Supreme Court granted STAIN TDM's cassation in the campus land dispute, so that STAIN TDM can resume activities on the new campus.

On March 1, 2023, Yaqut Cholil Qoumas, Minister of Religious Affairs, sworn in Dr. Syamsuar, M,Ag as the chairperson for the second term. Dr. Syamsuar will be in office from 2023 to 2027.

== Department ==
STAIN Teungku Dirundeng Meulaboh has 3 Department, each of them consist 3 to 5 Undergraduate Programs. The current Department is :

- Teacher Training and Education Department
- Islamic Law and Economics Department
- IIslamic Preaching and Communication Department

Each Department is led by a Head of department that appointed by the Chairperson, who assisted by a department secretary. Head of Department are responsible for lecture and curriculum managing, while finances and infrastructure are under the responsibility of the chairperson, who assisted by head of administration, academic and financial section, which are most senior non lecture officer.
