= Gle Bruek =

Coordinates: 5.2140°N 95.3050°E

Gleebruk was a village in the district (Kabupaten/Kota) of Aceh Besar just to the southwest of Banda Aceh, the capital of the special territory of Aceh on the island of Sumatra, Indonesia. It was completely destroyed by the tsunamis resulting from the 2004 Indian Ocean earthquake.

== See also ==
- Calang
- Teunom
- Meulaboh
- Tapaktuan
