= Teuku Sama Indra =

Indonesian politician (1964–2023)

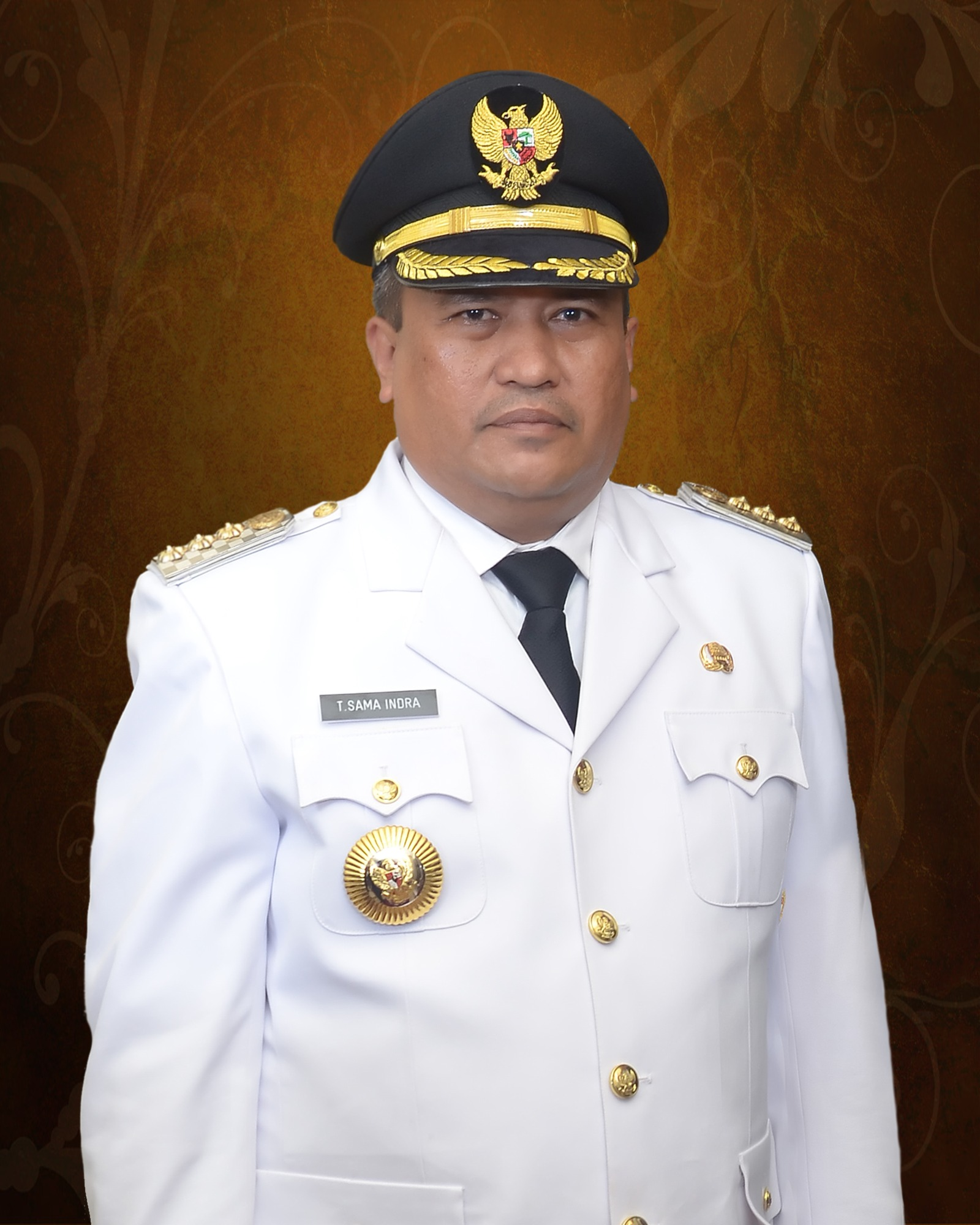

Member of the People's Representative Council of Aceh
- In office 30 September 2019 – 7 February 2023

Regent of South Aceh
- In office 22 April 2013 – 22 April 2018
- Preceded by: Husin Yusuf
- Succeeded by: Azwir

Personal details
- Born: 24 April 1964 Meukek, Indonesia
- Died: 7 February 2023 (aged 58) Banda Aceh, Indonesia
- Party: Democratic Party

Teuku Sama Indra (24 April 1964 – 7 February 2023) was an Indonesian politician. A member of the Democratic Party, he served as regent of South Aceh from 2013 to 2018.

Indra died in Banda Aceh on 7 February 2023, at the age of 58.
