= Sabet, Aceh =

Sabet
- Location in Aceh and Indonesia Sabet (Indonesia)
- Coordinates: 5°7′35.9472″N 95°25′10.272″E
- Country: Indonesia
- Province: Aceh
- Regency: Aceh Jaya Regency
- District: Jaya District
- Elevation: 2,326 ft (709 m)

Population (2010)
  - Total: 454
- Time zone: UTC+7 (Indonesia Western Standard Time)

Sabet is a village in Jaya District, Aceh Jaya Regency in Aceh. Its population is 454.

== Climate ==
Sabet has a tropical rainforest climate (Af) with heavy rainfall year-round.

Climate data for Sabet
| Month | Jan | Feb | Mar | Apr | May | Jun | Jul | Aug | Sep | Oct | Nov | Dec | Year |
|---|---|---|---|---|---|---|---|---|---|---|---|---|---|
| Mean daily maximum °C (°F) | 25.5 (77.9) | 26.5 (79.7) | 27.9 (82.2) | 28.5 (83.3) | 27.2 (81.0) | 27.3 (81.1) | 26.9 (80.4) | 27.5 (81.5) | 26.8 (80.2) | 27.0 (80.6) | 26.0 (78.8) | 25.5 (77.9) | 26.9 (80.4) |
| Daily mean °C (°F) | 22.7 (72.9) | 23.2 (73.8) | 23.7 (74.7) | 24.4 (75.9) | 23.9 (75.0) | 24.0 (75.2) | 23.5 (74.3) | 24.0 (75.2) | 23.5 (74.3) | 23.9 (75.0) | 23.2 (73.8) | 22.9 (73.2) | 23.6 (74.4) |
| Mean daily minimum °C (°F) | 20.0 (68.0) | 19.9 (67.8) | 19.6 (67.3) | 20.3 (68.5) | 20.6 (69.1) | 20.8 (69.4) | 20.1 (68.2) | 20.6 (69.1) | 20.2 (68.4) | 20.8 (69.4) | 20.4 (68.7) | 20.3 (68.5) | 20.3 (68.5) |
| Average precipitation mm (inches) | 223 (8.8) | 148 (5.8) | 201 (7.9) | 214 (8.4) | 237 (9.3) | 145 (5.7) | 137 (5.4) | 179 (7.0) | 243 (9.6) | 285 (11.2) | 289 (11.4) | 287 (11.3) | 2,588 (101.8) |
Source: Climate-Data.org
