= Amran (Indonesian politician) =

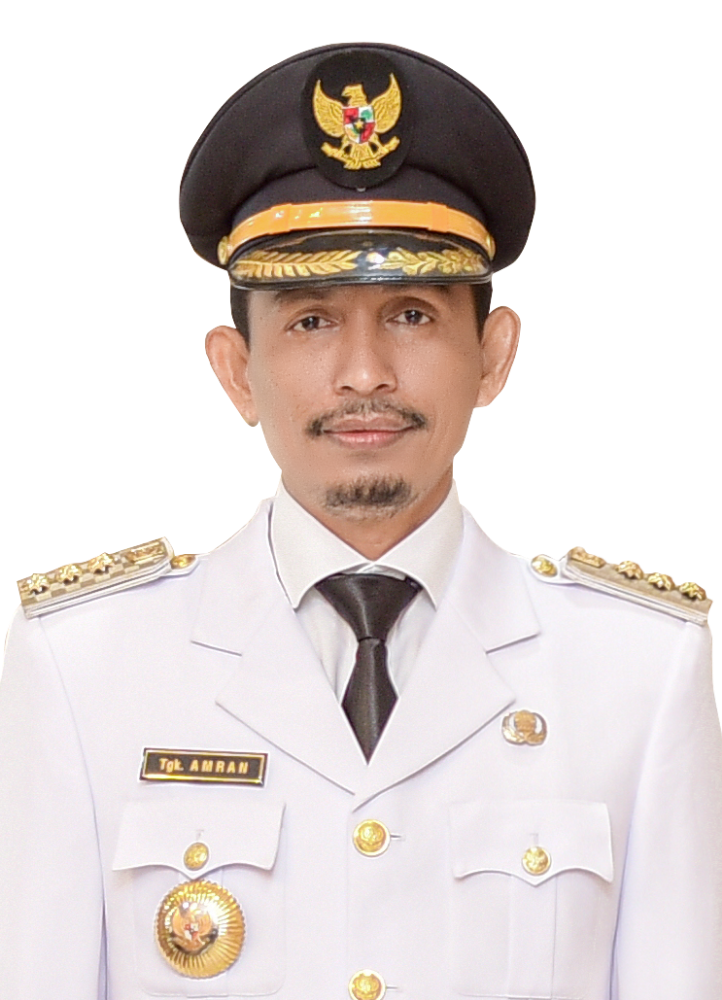

Regent of South Aceh
- In office 25 June 2020 – 27 September 2023; Acting: 3 December 2019 – 25 June 2020
- Preceded by: Azwir
- Succeeded by: Cut Syazalisma (act.); Mirwan MS

Personal details
- Born: 12 December 1975 (age 50) South Aceh, Indonesia
- Party: PNA

Teungku Amran (born 12 December 1975) is an Indonesian politician from Aceh and a former fighter of the Free Aceh Movement. He was the regent of South Aceh from 2020 to 2023, having previously served as vice regent from 2018 to 2020.

== Early life ==
Amran was born at the village of Pasie Lembang, in South Kluet district of South Aceh Regency, on 12 December 1975. He studied at various state-funded madrasa in South Aceh, graduating from a madrasah aliyah (high school equivalent) in Kluet district in 1996. He then joined the Free Aceh Movement (GAM), and within the organization he was commander of a territorial command based in Lhok Tapaktuan (in South Aceh). After the conflict, he worked for the Aceh Reintegration Agency (a body tasked with reintegrating GAM combatants) and later worked as a staffer at the Gunung Leuser National Park.

== Political career ==
Amran joined the Nanggroe Aceh Party (PNA) in 2013. In 2018, he ran as the running mate of Azwir in South Aceh's regency election, and the pair won the election with 46,667 votes (35.8%) in the seven-way race. Azwir and Amran were sworn in on 27 September 2018. While he was vice regent, Amran endorsed and campaigned for Joko Widodo in his 2019 reelection bid, while calling for the improvement of roads connecting South Aceh to North Sumatra and the opening of new flight routes to South Aceh.

One year into his term as regent, Azwir died of an illness on 2 December 2019, and Amran became acting regent. He was sworn in as full regent on 25 June 2020. As regent, Amran implemented payments to South Aceh's residents upon the death of family members. He also promoted the development of palm oil plantations in the regency and called for investors to build processing plants in South Aceh.

Amran ran for reelection in 2024, and campaigned among others with former GAM combatants. By the time of the election, he had moved from PNA to the Aceh Party. In the election, he obtained 47,346 votes (33.3%), losing to Mirwan MS.

== Personal life ==
He is married to Kailida Amran.
