= Teunom =

Coordinates: 4°28′51″N 95°47′31″E

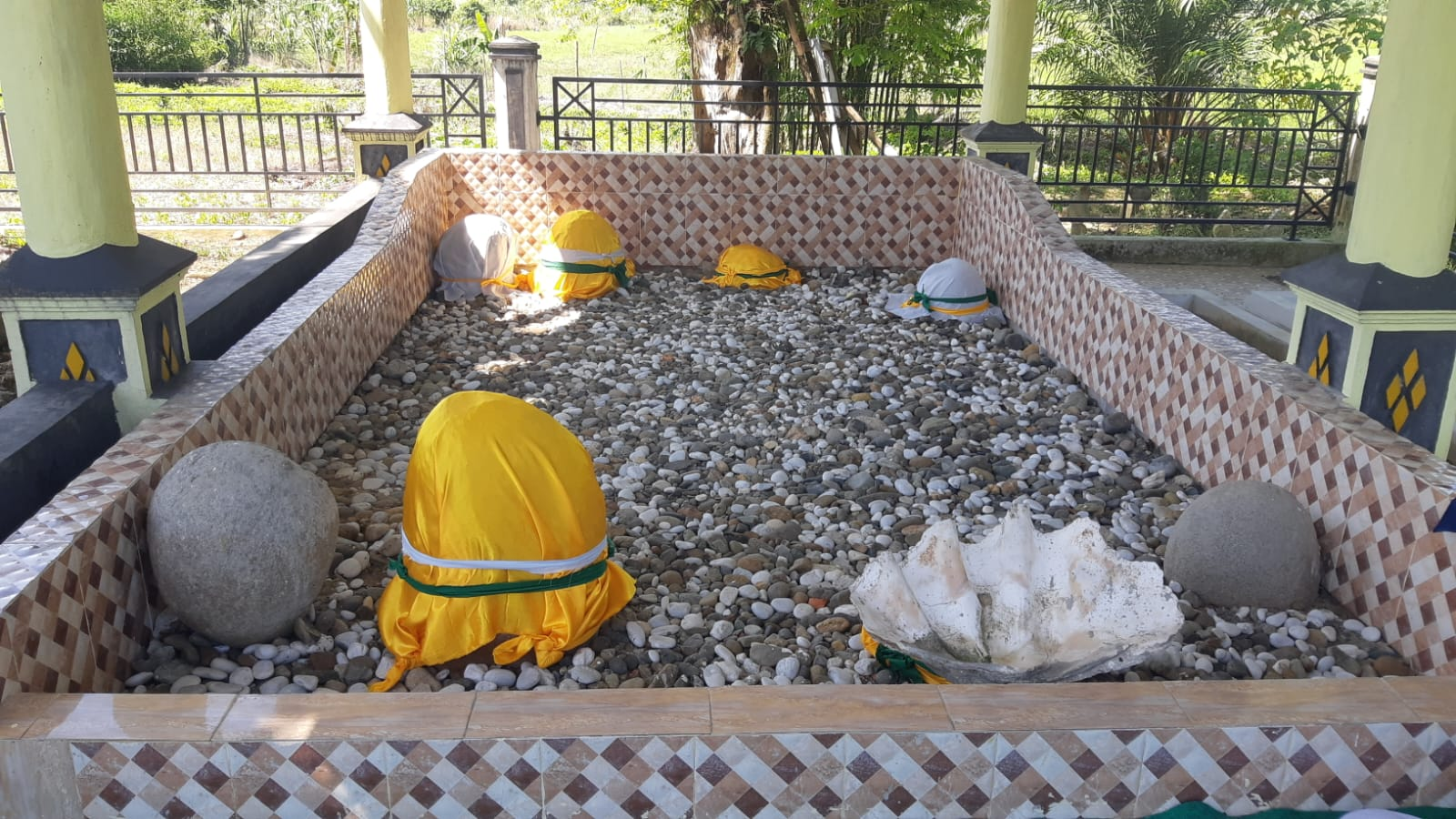
Tomb of Teungku Chik Babah Krueng

Teunom, a town in the Aceh Jaya Regency of Aceh province on the island of Sumatra in Indonesia, with a population of about 12,000, was reported to have "vanished completely leaving only scattered shards of concrete" as a result of the tsunami produced by the 2004 Indian Ocean earthquake. Officials stated that 8,000 out of a population of 18,000 were killed (January 2, 2005 story).

== See also ==
- Calang
- Meulaboh
- Tapaktuan
