= Mochamad Hasbi =

Indonesian army officer and politician (1939–2022)

Deputy Speaker of the Central Java Regional People's Representative Council
- In office 1999–2007

Regent of Boyolali
- In office 16 June 1984 – 1994
- Governor: Muhammad Ismail; Soewardi
- Preceded by: M. C. Thohir
- Succeeded by: S. Makgalantung

Personal details
- Born: 20 January 1939 Tapaktuan, Aceh, Dutch East Indies
- Died: 25 November 2022 (aged 83) Semarang, Central Java, Indonesia
- Party: Golkar
- Spouse: Tatik Soekiswati

Military service
- Allegiance: Indonesia
- Branch/service: Indonesian Army
- Years of service: ?–1995
- Rank: Brigadier general
- Unit: Engineer (CZI)
- Commands: Cilacap Military District; Yogyakarta Military District

Mochamad Hasbi (20 January 1939 – 25 November 2022) was an Indonesian army officer and politician who served as the Regent of Boyolali from 1984 until 1994 and the deputy speaker of the Central Java Regional People's Representative Council from 1999 until 2007.

== Early life and military career ==
Hasbi was born on 20 January 1939 in Tapaktuan, Aceh. Upon graduation from high school, Hasbi entered the officer's candidate school and became a non-commissioned officer shortly after. He pursued further military education at the advanced officer's course in 1977 and the Indonesian Army Command and General Staff College in 1978.

Shortly after finishing his advanced military education at the Indonesian Army Command and General Staff College, Hasbi was appointed as the commander of the Cilacap Military District in 1979, replacing Poedjono Pranyoto. After three years of service in the region, Hasbi was transferred to Yogyakarta, where he became the commander of the Yogyakarta military district. With his new post, Hasbi automatically became the chief of staff of the Yogyakarta garrison.

During his tenure in Yogyakarta, Hasbi initiated the Petrus (penembak misterius, mysterious shooter) killings. The killings were a series of extrajudicial killings in his region of command, with hundreds to thousands of criminals, even alleged ones, being killed by undercover army members and snipers. Hasbi claimed that the operation was started in November 1982. Hasbi's Petrus killings was later adopted by the armed forces under General L. B. Moerdani and was implemented nationwide. He was replaced from his post by Lieutenant Colonel Tuswandi on 14 June 1984.

== Political career ==
Hasbi was installed as the Regent of Boyolali by Governor of Central Java M. Ismail on 16 June 1984. Previously, Ismail had served as the military commander of Central Java and Hasbi's superior during his stint as district commander. Hasbi served a second term as regent in 1989. In 1991, Hasbi was the leading candidate to become the Governor of Aceh, his birthplace, till his candidacy was rejected by the political parties in the Aceh parliament.

During his term as regent, the Kedung Ombo Dam project was started by the central government. The project involved the resettlement of thousands of the inhabitants of the lands around the dam. Most of the populace refused to be resettled due to inadequate compensation. Construction went on despite the resistance, and soon the homes of the villagers became submerged in a reservoir.

Hasbi was involved in pressuring and intimidating the villagers to accept the compensation. He accused those who refused to be resettled as member of the then-banned Communist Party of Indonesia attempting to sabotage the government's plan. The military later deployed two companies of troops from the local infantry battalion on Hasbi's request to force the villagers out of the area.

After Hasbi's second term as regent expired in 1994, he was appointed by the then-governor Soewardi as his expert staff for political affairs. A year later, in 1995, Hasbi became the chairman of the Central Java chapter of the Mutual Assistance Consultative Organisation, one of the non-political wings of Golkar, the ruling party at that time. He was promoted to the rank of brigadier general sometime during this period.

Hasbi was nominated as a member of the Central Java Regional People's Representative Council in the 1997 Indonesian legislative election from Golkar. He was elected and became a member of the council. He was re-elected in 1999 and 2004 and became the deputy speaker of the council.

In 2003, Hasbi was implicated in a corruption case involving the misappropriation of the provincial budget funds of approximately 18.2 billion rupiahs. Although Hasbi was already named as a suspect in the case, the council refused to nullify his victory in the 2004 election. He was installed as a deputy speaker of the council for a second term on 6 October 2004, in accordance to a political arrangement following his loss in the bid for the speaker's seat.

Hasbi was eventually tried for the corruption case on 12 December 2006 by the Semarang State Court. Prosecutors for the case demanded two years of prison, a fine 100 million rupiahs, and for Hasbi to return all of the funds he had misappropriated. In the final trial held in early June 2007, Hasbi was sentenced to a year in prison. However, Hasbi evaded arrest and became a fugitive for around seven years until he handed himself over to the authorities on 25 March 2014.

== Personal life ==
Hasbi was married to Tatik Soekiswati and had four children.

Hasbi died on the evening of 25 November 2022 in Semarang. Regional Secretary of Boyolali Masruri confirmed his death, stating that he died due to old age. His body was laid at the Semarang state hospital before he was buried at the Husnul Khatimah public cemetery in Gunung Pati, Semarang.

== Awards ==
- Military Long Service Medals, 4th Category (Indonesian: Satyalancana Kesetiaan 8 Tahun) (1967)
- Medal for Combat Against Communists (Indonesian: Satyalancana Penegak) (1969)
- Medal for Contributing in the National Development (Indonesian: Satyalancana Pembangunan) (1989)
- Medal for Providing an Example of Meritorious Personality (Indonesian: Satyalancana Wira Karya) (1990)
