= MEQ =

MEQ may refer to:

- Middle East Quarterly, a quarterly journal
- Milliequivalents, a quantity used for chemical reactions
- Morningness–eveningness questionnaire, used to assess circadian rhythm
- Cut Nyak Dhien Airport (IATA code), located in Nagan Raya Regency, Aceh, Indonesia
