= Baitul Makmur Meulaboh Grand Mosque =

Mosque in Aceh, Indonesia

- Masjid Agung Baitul Makmur Meulaboh
- The mosque in 2014

- Location in Aceh, Northern Sumatra, Sumatra and Indonesia Baitul Makmur Meulaboh Grand Mosque (Northern Sumatra) Baitul Makmur Meulaboh Grand Mosque (Sumatra) Baitul Makmur Meulaboh Grand Mosque (Indonesia)

Religion
- Affiliation: Islam
- Branch/tradition: Sunni

Location
- Location: Seuneubok Village, Johan Pahlawan District, Meulaboh, West Aceh Regency, Aceh, Indonesia
- Interactive map of Baitul Makmur Meulaboh Grand Mosque
- Coordinates: 4.158785°N 96.124813°E

Architecture
- Type: Mosque
- Style: Arabic, Indian, Acehnese
- Completed: 1999; 27 years ago

Baitul Makmur Meulaboh Grand Mosque (Indonesian: Masjid Agung Baitul Makmur Meulaboh) is the largest mosque in the western coast of Meulaboh, Aceh, Indonesia.

== Architecture ==
A US Navy HH-60H Seahawk helicopter delivers relief supplies at Baitul Makmur Meulaboh Grand Mosque during the 2004 Indian Ocean earthquake and tsunami disaster.

The mosque has an architectural style of a combination of Arabic, Indian, and Acehnese, as well as a selection of bright brown colors combined with red brick on the dome of the mosque. The main characteristics of the mosque are three main domes flanked by two water tower domes of smaller size. The head shapes of all the domes are the similarly rounded and has pointed end, typical of Islamic architecture with the Middle Eastern and Asian blend. This mosque will be equipped with two new towers which is still under construction as of 2012. The inspiration of the Middle Eastern architectural style is also evident from the form of mihrab. The mihrab is dominated by brown color and shades of gold typical of bronze material with Islamic special ornaments.

The combination of the architectural characteristics has made the Great Mosque of Baitul Makmur Meulaboh entered into the 100 Most Beautiful Mosque in Indonesia, a book compiled by Teddy Tjokrosaputro & Aryananda Published by PT Andalan Media, August 2011.

== See also ==
- Islam in Indonesia
- List of mosques in Indonesia
