= Faumi Syahreza =

Indonesian footballer

Personal information
- Full name: Faumi Syahreza
- Date of birth: 29 March 1993 (age 33)
- Place of birth: South Aceh, Indonesia
- Height: 1.69 m (5 ft 7 in)
- Position: Midfielder

Senior career*
Years	Team	Apps	(Gls)
2014–2015	Persiraja Banda Aceh	13	(0)
2016–2017	Persijap Jepara	7	(0)
2017–2018	Persiraja Banda Aceh	20	(0)
2019	Persib Bandung B	10	(0)
2019–2020	PSPS Riau	11	(0)
- * Club domestic league appearances and goals as of 17 October 2019

Faumi Syahreza (born 29 March 1993) is an Indonesian professional footballer who plays as a midfielder.

== Club career ==
=== Persijap Jepara ===
In January 2017, he joined Persijap Jepara for the 2017 Liga 2.

=== Persiraja Banda Aceh ===
He had previously played for Persiraja Banda Aceh.
