= Calang =

- Town

Other transcription(s)
  - Jawoe: چالڠ
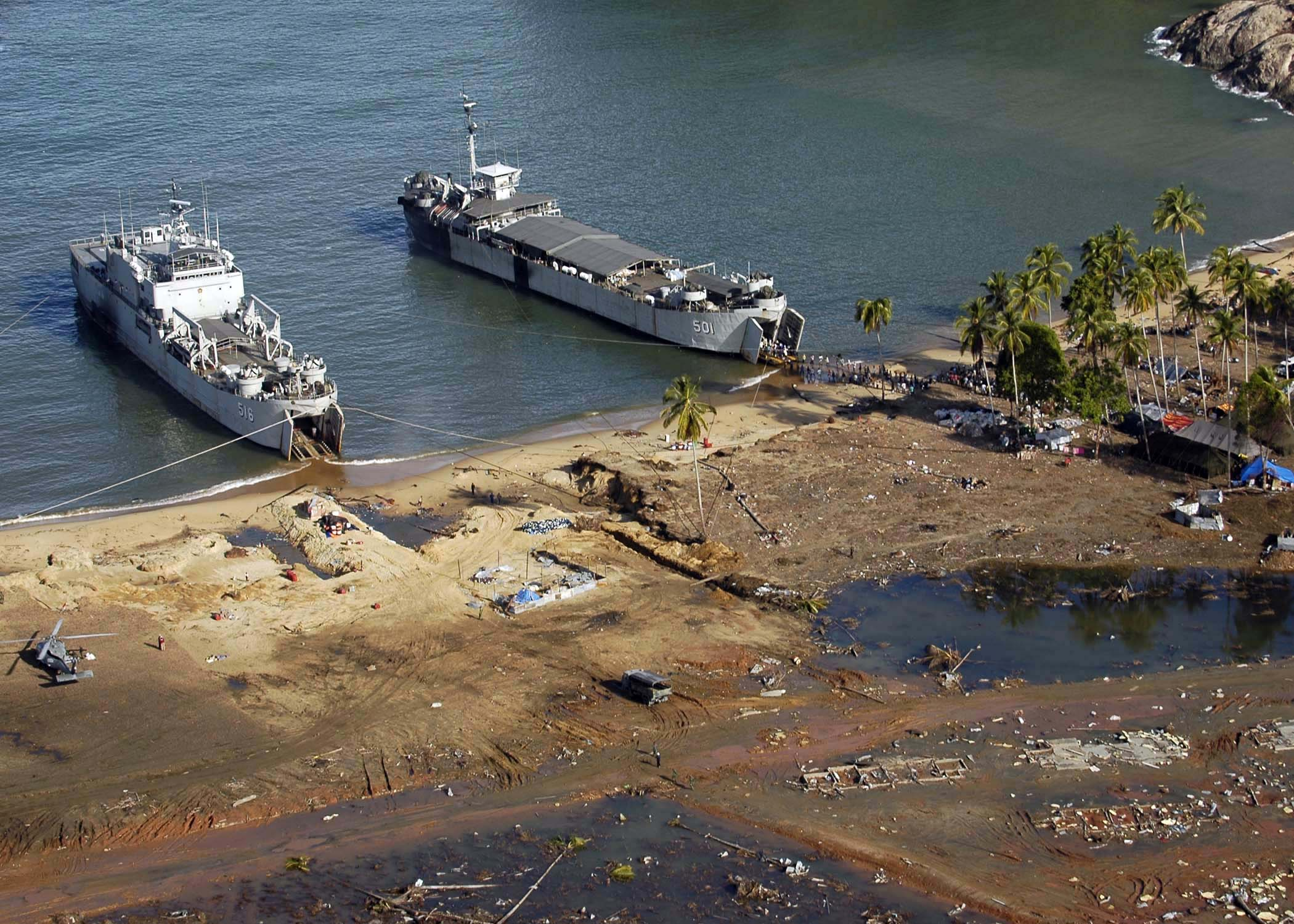
- Indonesian Navy landing craft KRI Teluk Banten (516) and KRI Teluk Langsa (501) and a US Navy Seahawk helicopter in Calang

- Location in Aceh, Northern Sumatra, Sumatra and Indonesia Calang (Northern Sumatra) Calang (Sumatra) Calang (Indonesia)
- Coordinates: 4°38′N 95°35′E
- Country: Indonesia
- Region: Sumatra
- Province: Aceh
- Regency: Aceh Jaya Regency
- Time zone: UTC+7 (IWST)
- Area code: (+62) 654

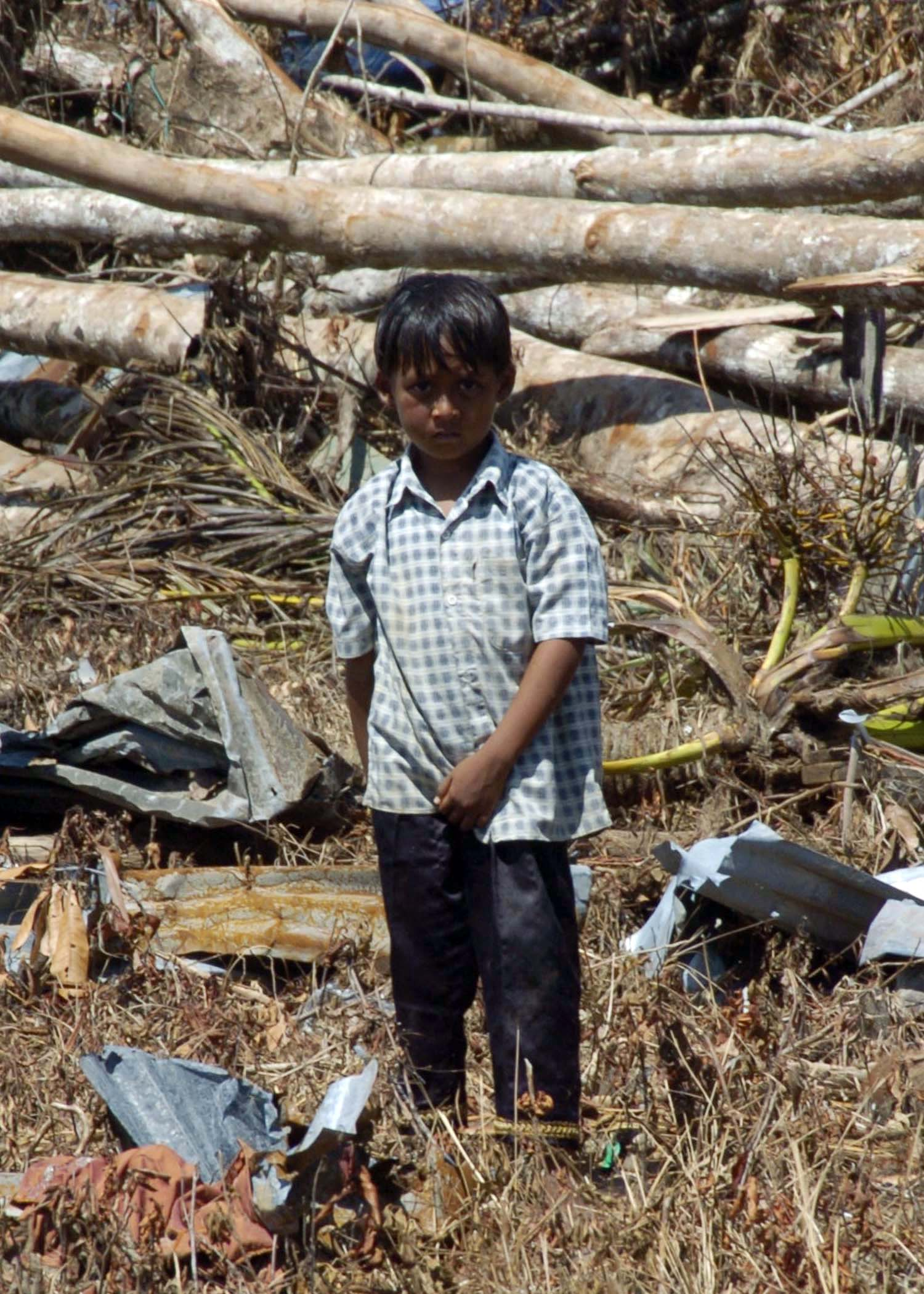
An Indonesian child stands amid the destruction of the 2004 tsunami in the village of Calang, Sumatra, Indonesia

Calang (Jawoe: چالڠ), the capital of the Aceh Jaya Regency of the special territory (daerah istimewa) of Aceh, is on the island of Sumatra, Indonesia. It had a population of about 12,000 though it was reported to have "vanished completely leaving only scattered shards of concrete" as a result of the tsunami produced by the 2004 Indian Ocean earthquake. Only about 30 per cent of the townspeople survived.

The trail of destruction left by the tsunami extends two kilometers inland from the coast. Whole hills have been washed away.

The township, a former Indonesian Military (TNI, Tentara Nasional Indonesia) stronghold, has been relocated inland, according to Indonesian Welfare Minister Alwi Shihab.

== Climate ==
Calang has a tropical rainforest climate (Af) with heavy to very heavy rainfall year-round.

Climate data for Calang
Month	Jan	Feb	Mar	Apr	May	Jun	Jul	Aug	Sep	Oct	Nov	Dec	Year
Mean daily maximum °C (°F)	29.1 (84.4)	30.0 (86.0)	31.6 (88.9)	32.3 (90.1)	31.2 (88.2)	31.4 (88.5)	31.0 (87.8)	31.6 (88.9)	30.8 (87.4)	30.9 (87.6)	29.7 (85.5)	29.0 (84.2)	30.7 (87.3)
Daily mean °C (°F)	26.3 (79.3)	26.6 (79.9)	27.5 (81.5)	28.2 (82.8)	27.8 (82.0)	27.8 (82.0)	27.3 (81.1)	27.9 (82.2)	27.3 (81.1)	27.6 (81.7)	26.8 (80.2)	26.3 (79.3)	27.3 (81.1)
Mean daily minimum °C (°F)	23.5 (74.3)	23.3 (73.9)	23.4 (74.1)	24.1 (75.4)	24.4 (75.9)	24.3 (75.7)	23.7 (74.7)	24.2 (75.6)	23.8 (74.8)	24.4 (75.9)	23.9 (75.0)	23.7 (74.7)	23.9 (75.0)
Average rainfall mm (inches)	231 (9.1)	170 (6.7)	234 (9.2)	287 (11.3)	327 (12.9)	266 (10.5)	285 (11.2)	312 (12.3)	369 (14.5)	384 (15.1)	357 (14.1)	250 (9.8)	3,472 (136.7)
Source: Climate-Data.org

== See also ==
- Gle Bruek
- Teunom
- Meulaboh
- Tapaktuan
