= Indra Jaya =

District in Aceh, Indonesia

- District
- Interactive map of Indra Jaya
- Coordinates: 5.045°N 95.356389°E
- Country: Indonesia
- Province: Aceh
- Regency: Aceh Jaya

Area
  - Total: 302.60 km^{2} (116.83 sq mi)

Population (2023)
  - Total: 7,662
  - Density: 25.32/km^{2} (65.58/sq mi)
- Time zone: UTC+7 (WIB)
- Postal Code: 23657

Indra Jaya is an administrative district (kecamatan) in Aceh Jaya Regency, Aceh, Indonesia.
