= Nicah (Grong Grong) =

- Village
- Location within Indonesia
- Coordinates: 5°21′55.9″N 95°54′36.2″E
- Country: Indonesia
- Province: Aceh
- Regency: Pidie
- District: Grong Grong

Population (2010)
  - Total: 314
- Time zone: UTC+8 (WITA)

Nicah is a village in the Pidie Regency, in the Aceh province of Indonesia. This village has a population of 314 according to the 2010 census. Nicah is the town in the country's capital city North West Jakarta and is around 1,053 mi (or 1,694 km) long.
