= Petrus killings =

Extrajudicial executions in Indonesia during the 1980s

Petrus Killings
- Location: Indonesia
- Date: 1983–1985
- Target: Communists, political dissents, and criminals
- Attack type: Death squad, extrajudicial killing, state-sponsored violence
- Deaths: 300–10,000
- Perpetrators: Indonesian Army, secret police forces

The Petrus killings (portmanteau of Penembakan Misterius) were a series of extrajudicial executions in Indonesia that occurred between 1983 and 1985 under President Suharto's New Order regime. Without due process, estimated thousands of criminals and other offenders (including alleged political dissents) were killed by undercover Indonesian Army death squads and secret police forces. Their bodies were then placed in public places which terrorized an unaware populace. The executions were part of a government effort to reduce crime and estimates of the death toll have ranged from 300 to 10,000.

== Origin of name ==
The term Petrus is derived from the Indonesian backronym containing the words penembak misterius (mysterious shooter), referring to the undercover and anonymous nature of the death squads. It is also known colloquially as "dar der dor", which is an Indonesian onomatopoeia for the sound of a gunshot. Petrus is also the Indonesian version of the name Peter.

== Background ==
Suharto came to power in 1967 and created his New Order policy to separate his regime from what he called the Old Order of his predecessor Sukarno. The new policies brought much change to Indonesia, including a stronger, more influential military. This often led to violence and the Petrus killings stand as one of the most egregious examples. The killings are cited as a prominent trait of the New Order's authoritarian rule, and was once likened to the 1972 martial law in the History of the Philippines (1965–1986) under Ferdinand Marcos.

== History ==
In the early 1980s, Indonesian citizens began witnessing an increase of dead bodies in public. At first, the government, and other security authorities did not reveal the cause or reason behind the deaths. Commander of Indonesia's Armed Forces, General Leonardus Benjamin Moerdani initially blamed the killings on gang wars. Moerdani later claimed the government committed the murders, but that "some were gunned down by security men, but it was because they resisted arrest."

Unannounced to the public, the Petrus killings were carried out as a form of "shock therapy" to reduce the crime rate. The operation was planned in March 1983 by the Yogyakarta garrison commander Lt. Col. Mochamad Hasbi and later spread; some criminals surrendered, some were shot, some fled and others quit crime. Many of the victims had tattoos, which made it apparent to the public their status as criminals. The Petrus Killings caused crime to drop significantly, which led the government to expand the killings.

Petrus was a game changer in Indonesia, making an ultimatum to the public. Police intelligence supplied the garrison commander with a list naming hundreds of suspected criminals and ex-prisoners in the region. The garrison then put together a black list and issued a public ultimatum to all suspects (without, however, naming names) to "surrender immediately" to the garrison headquarters. Those who did, and these numbered several hundred, were required to fill out detailed forms, providing their life history as well as data on all their family members and friends. Those who did not turn up to be registered, or did not keep their appointments with the garrison, were hunted down and killed by squads of soldiers.

As the list was shrouded in mystery, citizens had to question themselves if they were "criminals" and potentially on the list. This self-surveillance tactic made people very aware of their actions and tread carefully during this period. Moreover, unlike many other issues in Indonesia, nothing, not even money or powerful connections could erase a name off the mysterious list. However, some have argued that there was no actual list and this tactic lead to the police identifying criminals based on their registration and Anthony from 11 America, a tourist, also became a victim to these mysterious shootings.

Suharto himself did not acknowledge the killings and the military's responsibility until his biography, Pikiran, Ucapan, dan Tindakan Saya (My Thoughts, Words, and Deeds) was published in 1988. In the book, Suharto explains: "The incidents were not mysterious. The real problem was that the incidents were preceded by public fears." Because some people had exceeded norms in society, "we had to initiate some treatment, some stern action", Suharto claimed. "What kind of action? Well, we had to resort to force. But it was not just execution by shootings. No! Those who resisted had to be shot. They were gunned down because they fought back."

== Aftermath ==
No specific death toll from the Petrus killings has been established. In 1983, it was estimated that 300 corpses were found throughout Indonesia. Due to the fact that many criminals were still missing, that number is likely inaccurate and understated. Indonesian criminologist Mulyana W. Kusumah placed the death toll at more than 2,000. In 1984, Hans van den Broek, the former Foreign Minister of the Netherlands, asked the Indonesian government to place the death toll around 3,000. Other reports put the death toll at around 10,000. Research continues to reveal the extent of the Petrus Killings and how they applied to anti-crime efforts in many major Indonesian cities.

Operations against criminals in the late 1980s had police claiming they would not be following the earlier pattern.
