= Meukek =

District in Aceh Selatan Regency, Aceh Province, Indonesia

Meukek is a district in South Aceh Regency in Aceh, Northern Sumatra, Indonesia. Meukek was attacked by the American Navy in January 1839.

== List of villages ==
1. Alue Baro
2. Alue Meutuah
3. Aron TUnggai
4. Blang Bladeh
5. Blang Kuala
6. Blang Teungoh
7. Buket Meuh
8. Drien Jalo
9. Ie Buboh
10. Ie Dingen
11. Jambo Papeun
12. Keude Meukek
13. Kuta Baro
14. Kuta Buloh I
15. Kuta Buloh II
16. Labuhan Tarok I
17. Labuhan Tarok II
18. Ladang Baro
19. Ladang Tuha
20. Lhok Aman
21. Lhok Mamplam
22. Rot Teungoh
23. Tanjung Harapan
