= Syekh Hamzah Fansyuri Airport =

- IATA: FSH; ICAO: WIMI

Summary
- Airport type: Public
- Owner: Government of Indonesia
- Location: Singkil, Aceh Singkil Regency, Aceh, Indonesia
- Opened: 28 April 2008; 18 years ago
- Elevation AMSL: 0 ft / 0 m
- Coordinates: 02°16′10″N 097°58′05″E

Map
- Location in Northern Sumatra, Sumatra and Indonesia Syekh Hamzah Fansyuri Airport (Sumatra) Syekh Hamzah Fansyuri Airport (Indonesia)

Runways
Direction	Length		Surface
Direction	ft	m	Surface
12/30	6,400	1,950	Asphalt

Syekh Hamzah Fansyuri Airport (Indonesian: Bandar Udara Syekh Hamzah Fansyuri) is an airport located in Singkil, Aceh Singkil Regency, Aceh, Indonesia.

== Airlines and destinations ==
The following destinations are served from this airport:

Airlines	Destinations
Susi Air	Medan

== Statistic ==
Frequency of flights at Syekh Hamzah Fansyuri Airport
Rank	Destinations	Frequency (weekly)	Airline(s)
1	Medan, North Sumatra	2 (every Monday and Thursday)	Susi Air
