= Sigli =

Town in Aceh Province, Indonesia

Coordinates: 5°23′4″N 95°57′34″E

- District
- Town of Sigli
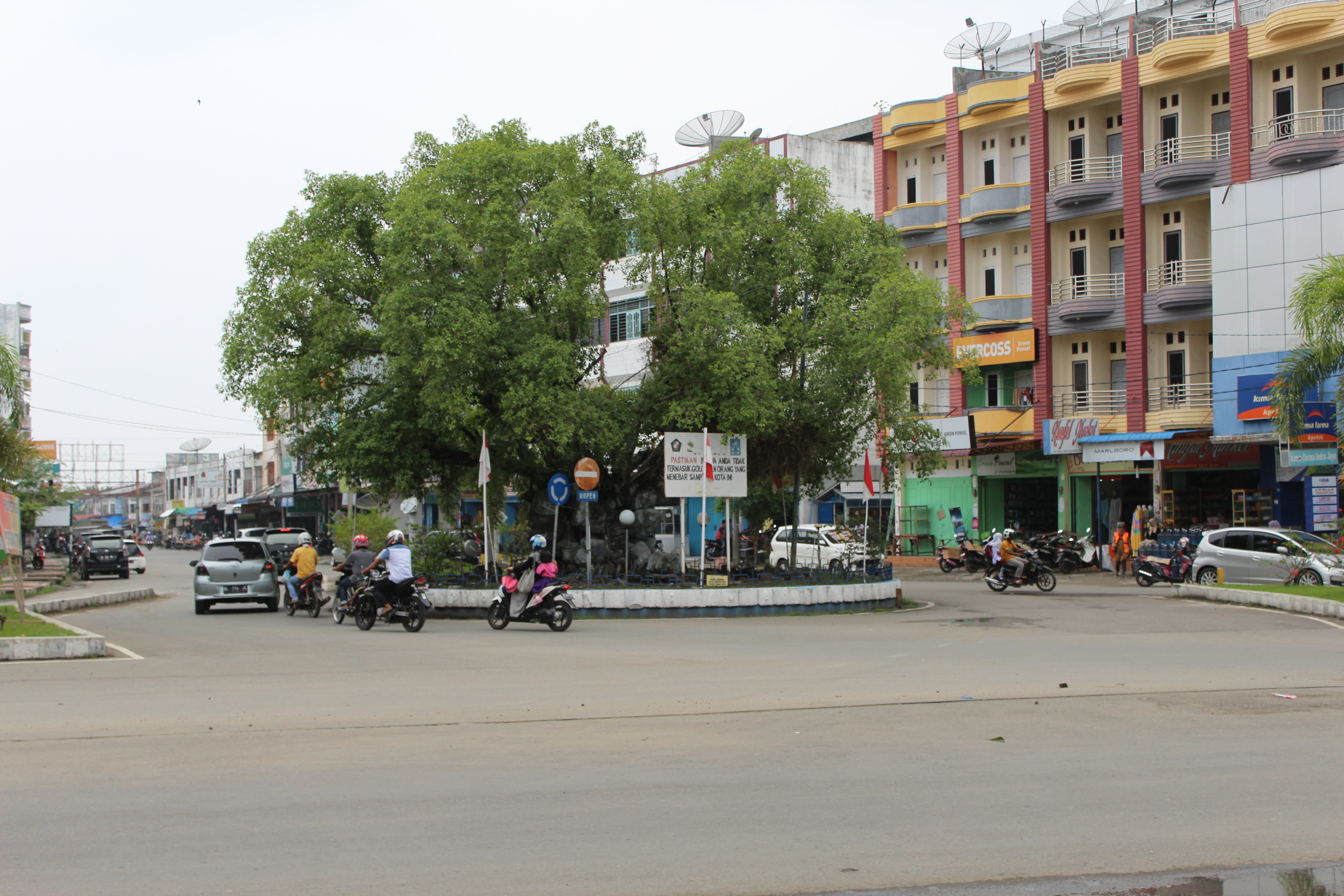
- Interactive map of Sigli
- Country: Indonesia
- Region: Sumatra
- Province: Aceh
- Regency: Pidie Regency

Area
  - Total: 32.65 km^{2} (12.61 sq mi)

Population (mid 2025 estimate)
  - Total: 68,987
  - Density: 2,113/km^{2} (5,472/sq mi)
- Time zone: UTC+7 (Western Indonesia Time)

Sigli is a town in Aceh province of Indonesia and the seat (capital) of Pidie Regency. Sigli is located 112 kilometers to the south of the capital of Aceh province, Banda Aceh. The town itself (Kota Sigli) covers 6.56 km^{2} and had 21,223 residents in mid 2025, but the urban area includes the surrounding Pidie District which has an additional area of 26.09 km^{2} with 47,764 residents in mid 2025.

== Villages ==
Kota Sigli District is divided into 15 villages (gampong), grouped into three mukim (Sigli, Beudee and Asan). These are listed below with their official estimated populations as at mid 2024. Pidie District is divided into 64 villages, grouped into eight mukim.

- Blok Sawa (Mukim Sigli) 852
- Pante Teungoh (Mukim Sigli) 892
- Kramat Dalam (Mukim Sigli) 704
- Benteng (Mukim Sigli) 999
- Blang Paseh (Mukim Sigli) 3,803
- Kramat Luar (Mukim Beudee) 2,684
- Pasi Peukan Baro (Mukim Beudee) 611
- Pasi Rawa (Mukim Beudee) 1,239
- Kuala Pidie (Mukim Beudee) 850
- Blok Bengkel (Mukim Beudee) 629
- Tanjong Krueng (Mukim Asan) 440
- Mns Peukan (Mukim Asan) 1,092
- Gampong Asan (Mukim Asan) 1,089
- Blang Asan (Mukim Asan) 1,901
- Lampoh Krueng (Mukim Asan) 2,255
- Tijue (Mukim Gampong Lhang)
- Lampeudeu Tunong (Mukim Gampong Lhang)
- Puuk (Mukim Gampong Lhang)
- Lampeudeu Barok (Mukim Gampong Lhang)
- Paya (Mukim Gampong Lhang)
- Mesjid Runtoh (Mukim Gampong Lhang)
- Baroh (Mukim Gampong Lhang)
- Dayah Teungoh (Mukim Gampong Lhang)
- Dayah Tanoh (Mukim Keulibeut)
- Cot Geunduek (Mukim Keulibeut)
- Tumpok Laweueng (Mukim Keulibeut)
- Ulee Ceue Keulibeut (Mukim Keulibeut)
- Keudee Keulibeut (Mukim Keulibeut)
- Ulee Tutue (Mukim Keulibeut)
- Dayah Tutong (Mukim Keulibeut)
- Labui (Mukim Paloh)
- Gampong (Mukim Paloh)
- Pulo Pisang (Mukim Paloh)
- Lamkuta (Mukim Paloh)
- Kampong Pukat (Mukim Paloh)
- Kampong Barat (Mukim Paloh)
- Paloh (Mukim Paloh)
- Lampoh Lada (Mukim Asan)
- Keuniree (Mukim Asan)
- Tumpok 40 (Mukim Asan)
- Cot Teungoh (Mukim Asan)
- Cot Rheng (Mukim Asan)
- Kampong Baro (Mukim Kampong Baro)
- Pulo Bubee (Mukim Kampong Baro)
- Tibang (Mukim Kampong Baro)
- Rawa (Mukim Kampong Baro)
- Peukan Baro (Mukim Kampong Baro)
- Mancang (Mukim Kampong Baro)
- Gajah Ayee (Mukim Kampong Baro)
- Lhok Keutapang (Mukim Kampong Baro)
- Dalueng (Mukim Teubeng)
- Ulee Ceueteubeng (Mukim Teubeng)
- Meucat (Mukim Teubeng)
- Dayah Teubeng (Mukim Teubeng)
- Tanjong Teubeng (Mukim Teubeng)
- Jawa Teubeng (Mukim Teubeng)
- Bayu Teubeng (Mukim Teubeng)
- Abo Teubeng (Mukim Teubeng)
- Keutapang Sanggeue (Mukim Sanggeue)
- Krueng Dhoe (Mukim Sanggeue)
- Sirong (Mukim Sanggeue)
- Keutumbu (Mukim Sanggeue)
- Jeumpa (Mukim Sanggeue)
- Raya Sanggeue (Mukim Sanggeue)
- Jeuleupee (Mukim Sanggeue)
- Ujong Langgo (Mukim Sanggeue)
- Cot Geuleumpang (Mukim Utue/Balo)
- Seuriweuk (Mukim Utue/Balo)
- Mesjid Utue (Mukim Utue/Balo)
- Leubeu (Mukim Utue/Balo)
- Batee (Mukim Utue/Balo)
- Raya Utue (Mukim Utue/Balo)
- Seukumbrok (Mukim Utue/Balo)
- Bie (Mukim Utue/Balo)
- Blang Kuala (Mukim Utue/Balo)
- Alue (Mukim Utue/Balo)
- Seukee (Mukim Utue/Balo)
- Paya Lintang (Mukim Utue/Balo)
- Puli (Mukim Utue/Balo)

== Sport ==
PSAP Sigli is the football club from Sigli.

== Climate ==
Sigli has a tropical monsoon climate (Am) with moderate rainfall from February to September and heavy rainfall from October to January.

Climate data for Sigli
Month	Jan	Feb	Mar	Apr	May	Jun	Jul	Aug	Sep	Oct	Nov	Dec	Year
Mean daily maximum °C (°F)	28.8 (83.8)	29.8 (85.6)	31.5 (88.7)	32.3 (90.1)	30.8 (87.4)	31.1 (88.0)	30.7 (87.3)	31.3 (88.3)	30.5 (86.9)	30.8 (87.4)	29.5 (85.1)	28.8 (83.8)	30.5 (86.9)
Daily mean °C (°F)	26.2 (79.2)	26.6 (79.9)	27.4 (81.3)	28.3 (82.9)	27.7 (81.9)	28.0 (82.4)	27.4 (81.3)	28.0 (82.4)	27.3 (81.1)	27.8 (82.0)	26.8 (80.2)	26.3 (79.3)	27.3 (81.2)
Mean daily minimum °C (°F)	23.6 (74.5)	23.5 (74.3)	23.4 (74.1)	24.3 (75.7)	24.6 (76.3)	24.9 (76.8)	24.2 (75.6)	24.7 (76.5)	24.1 (75.4)	24.8 (76.6)	24.1 (75.4)	23.9 (75.0)	24.2 (75.5)
Average rainfall mm (inches)	209 (8.2)	139 (5.5)	129 (5.1)	102 (4.0)	108 (4.3)	53 (2.1)	61 (2.4)	54 (2.1)	89 (3.5)	168 (6.6)	250 (9.8)	299 (11.8)	1,661 (65.4)
Source: Climate-Data.org
