= Pidie Regency =

Regency in Aceh, Indonesia

Pidie Regency Kabupaten Pidie
- Regency
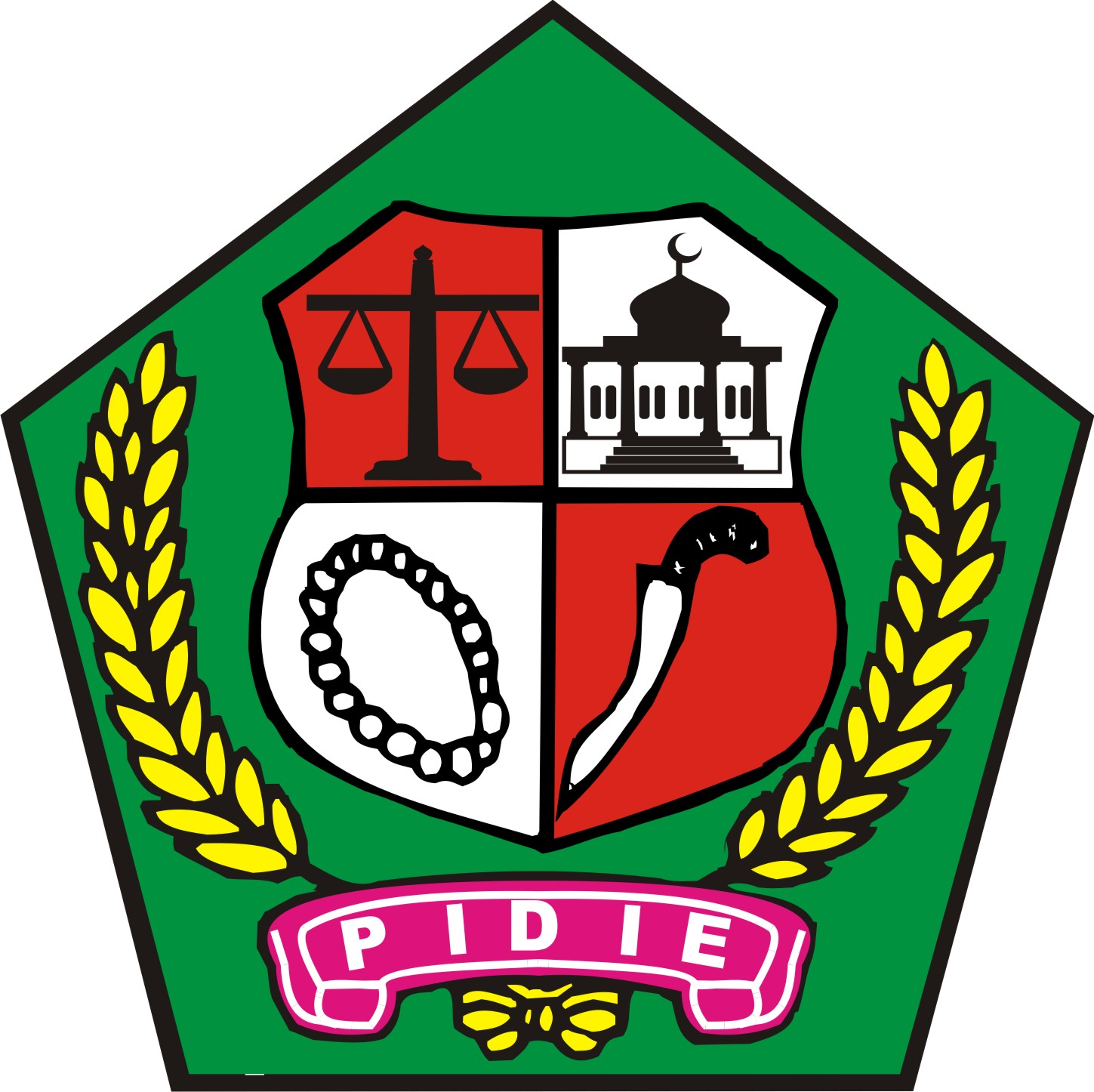
- Seal

- Location within Aceh

- Location in Aceh, Northern Sumatra, Sumatra and Indonesia Pidie Regency (Northern Sumatra) Pidie Regency (Sumatra) Pidie Regency (Indonesia)
- Coordinates: 4.66667°N 96°E
- Country: Indonesia
- Region: Sumatra
- Province: Aceh
- Established: 1956
- Regency seat: Sigli

Government
  - Regent: Sarjani Abdullah
  - Vice Regent: Alzaizi

Area
  - Total: 3,184.46 km^{2} (1,229.53 sq mi)

Population (mid 2025 estimate)
  - Total: 456,942
  - Density: 143.491/km^{2} (371.641/sq mi)
- Time zone: UTC+7 (IWST)
- Area code: (+62) 653
- Website: pidiekab.go.id

Pidie Regency (also known as: Pidie, Pědir; "king of"; Indonesian: Kabupaten Pidie) is a regency of Aceh Province, located in the north of the island of Sumatra, in western Indonesia. It is bordered by the Malacca Strait in the north, by Pidie Jaya Regency (which was formerly a part of Pidie Regency until it was separated off on 2 January 2007) and Bireuen Regency in the northeast, by Aceh Besar Regency and Aceh Jaya Regency in the west, and by Aceh Barat Regency and Aceh Tengah Regency in the southeast.

The regency covers a land area of 3,184.46 square kilometres and had a population of 379,108 people at the 2010 Census and 435,275 at the 2020 Census; the official estimate as of mid 2025 was 456,942 (comprising 227,933 males and 229,009 females). The administrative capital is in the town of Sigli, although the surrounding Pidie District contains the suburbs of the town and is more populous. Pidie Regency was the largest rice-producing area of Aceh province, producing some 20% of its total output.

== History ==
Pidie Regency has a long and storied history, with archaeological evidence suggesting human habitation in the area dating back thousands of years. Pidie Regency also has a rich historical background, with its history intertwined with the broader history of the Aceh region. The area has been influenced by various kingdoms and colonial powers over the centuries. It was once part of the Sultanate of Aceh, which was an important Islamic kingdom in the region. During the Dutch colonial period, Pidie was integrated into the broader colonial administration of Aceh. Historical sites and landmarks can be found in most of the regency, reflecting its diverse past.

== Culture ==
The population of Pidie Regency is predominantly of Acehnese descent, with a strong Islamic heritage. Traditional customs and ceremonies are an integral part of daily life, and the regency is known for its rich artistic traditions and spiritual practices. Festivals and cultural events are celebrated throughout the year, showcasing the region's unique heritage.

== Economy ==
The economy of Pidie Regency is largely based on agriculture, with rice, corn, coffee, and other crops being significant contributors to the local economy. Fishing and livestock farming are also important economic activities. In recent years, efforts have been made to improve infrastructure and boost local industries to support economic development.

== Administrative divisions ==
The regency is divided administratively into twenty-three districts (kecamatan), listed below with their areas and their populations at the 2010 Census and the 2020 Census, together with the official estimates as of mid 2025. The table also includes the locations of the district administrative centres, the number of administrative villages (gampong) in each district, and its post code.

Kode Wilayah	Name of District (kecamatan)	Area in km^{2}	Pop'n Census 2010	Pop'n Census 2020	Pop'n Estimate mid 2025	Admin centre	No. of villages	Post code
11.07.05	Geumpang	657.07	6,008	7,184	7,530	Geumpang	5	24167
11.07.27	Mane	675.04	7,786	8,905	9,313	Mane	4	24189
11.07.06	Glumpang Tiga	54.84	16,888	19,348	20,356	Glumpang Minyeuk	34	24183
11.07.29	Glumpang Baro	12.12	9,622	10,981	11,540	Cot Glumpang	21	24180
11.07.13	Mutiara	16.75	18,418	21,041	22,092	Beureunuen	29	24173
11.07.24	Mutiara Timur (East Mutiara)	31.24	30,767	35,319	37,085	Bandar Mutiara	48	24175
11.07.21	Tiro (Truseb)	174.69	7,097	8,440	8,837	Tiro	19	24174
11.07.19	Tangse	786.58	23,509	26,948	28,327	Tangse	28	24166
11.07.22	Keumala	49.30	8,905	10,492	10,994	Keumala	18	24165
11.07.31	Titeue	27.42	6,101	7,176	7,524	Titeue	13	24168
11.07.17	Sakti	38.52	18,817	21,374	22,470	Kota Bakti	49	24164
11.07.11	Mila	35.32	8,068	9,835	10,341	Mila	20	24163
11.07.14	Padang Tiji	257.59	19,633	24,063	25,189	Padang Tiji	64	24161
11.07.04	Delima	24.99	18,659	21,673	22,733	Reubee	44	24161
11.07.25	Grong-Grong	7.77	6,209	6,753	7,095	Grong-Grong	15	24150
11.07.07	Indrajaya	25.41	20,715	23,325	24,523	Caleue	49	24171
11.07.15	Peukan Baro	17.29	18,253	20,619	21,716	Lampoih Saka	48	24172
11.07.08	Kembang Tanjong	28.87	19,315	21,609	22,723	Kembang Tanjong	45	24182
11.07.18	Simpang Tiga	24.86	20,291	23,211	24,378	Simpang Tiga	52	24181
11.07.09	Kota Sigli (Sigli town)	6.56	18,829	20,202	21,223	Kota Sigli	15	24115 -24119
11.07.16	Pidie (district)	26.09	39,814	45,452	47,764	Lhok Keutapang	64	24151
11.07.03	Batee	46.11	18,077	20,589	21,566	Batee	28	24152
11.07.12	Muara Tiga	160.03	17,427	20,736	21,623	Laweueng	18	24153
	Totals	3,184.46	379,108	435,275	456,942	Kota Sigli	730	

== Notable people ==
- Zaini Abdullah, governor of Aceh 2013–2018
- Teungku Chik di Tiro, Indonesian national hero
- Daud Beureueh, military governor of Aceh
- Teuku Mohammad Hasan, first governor of Sumatra
- Ibrahim Hasan, former governor of Aceh and former minister for food
- Hasan Tiro, founder and command center of GAM
- Teuku Iskandar, scholar, one of the founders of Syiah Kuala University Aceh
