= Meulaboh =

Meulaboh Meulabôh Kota Tauhid Sufi
- Town

Other transcription(s)
  - Jawoe: ملابوه
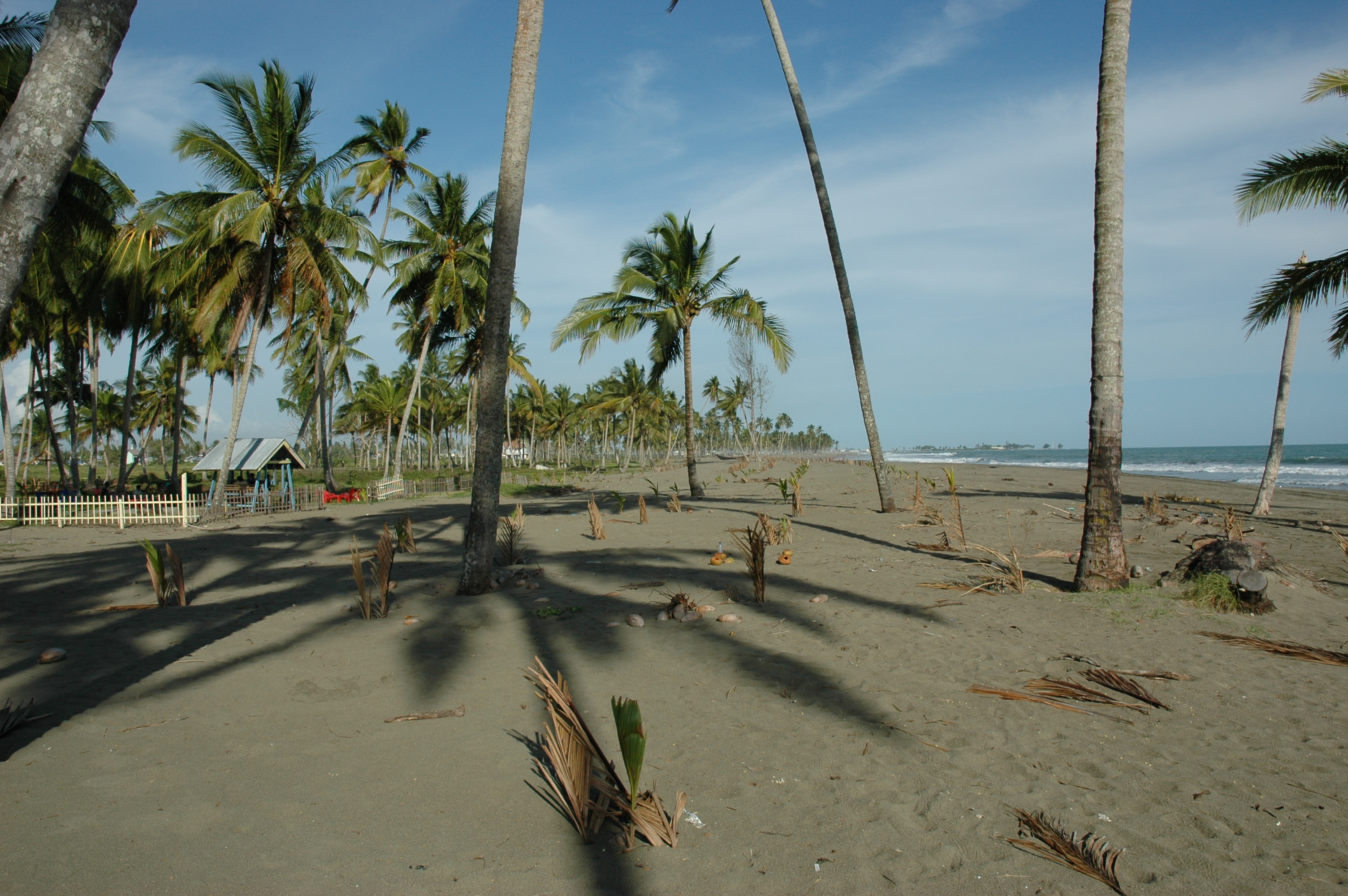
- Pantai Batu Putih (White Sands Beach) in Meulaboh

- Location within Aceh Location within Northern Sumatra Location within Sumatra Location within Indonesia
- Coordinates: 4°8′N 96°7′E
- Country: Indonesia
- Province: Aceh
- Regency: West Aceh Regency

Area
  - Total: 44.91 km^{2} (17.34 sq mi)

Population (mid 2023 estimate)
  - Total: 67,148
  - Density: 1,495/km^{2} (3,872/sq mi)
- Time zone: UTC+7 (WIB)

Meulaboh (Acehnese: Meulabôh, Jawoe: ملابوه; or Moulabouh) is the capital of West Aceh Regency, Indonesia.

== Geography ==
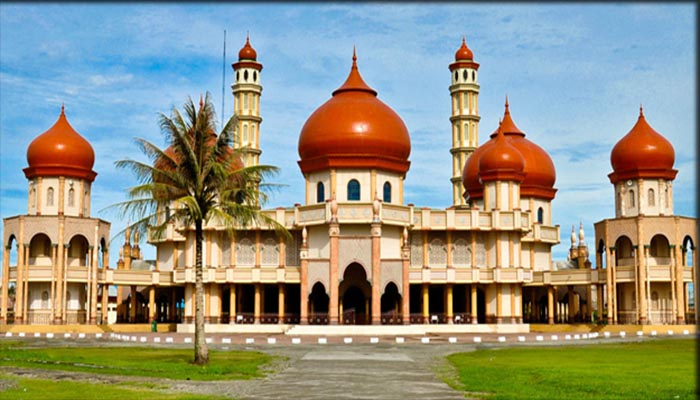
Baitul Makmur Meulaboh Grand Mosque

Meulaboh is about 245 km southeast of Banda Aceh, the capital of Aceh province and western part of Aceh province. Meulaboh is located in the western part of Sumatra island.

== 2004 Indian Ocean earthquake event ==
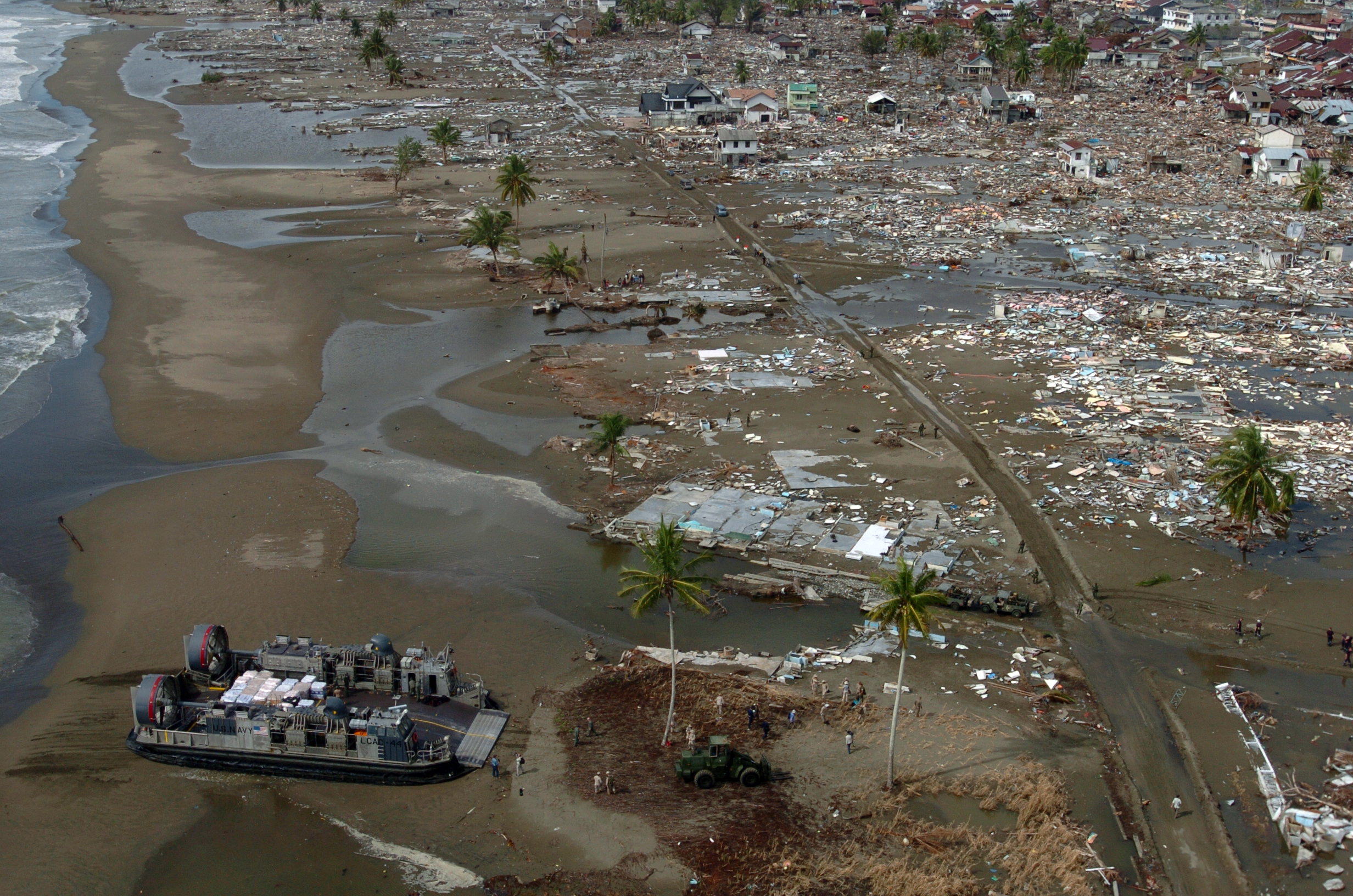
Landing Craft Air Cushion (LCAC) vehicle from USS Bonhomme Richard (LHD 6) was delivering materials and supplies needed by the citizens of Meulaboh.

"The casualty rates in Meulaboh defy imagination," said Aitor Lacomba, Indonesian director of aid group International Rescue Committee. "Tens of thousands need immediate assistance there."

A damaged airstrip was cleared, enabling International Red Cross medical teams from Japan, Spain and Singapore to begin treating survivors. Red Cross engineer Sara Escudero said "There is a strong smell of putrefaction and, whilst body retrieval has commenced, it can be assumed that there are still hundreds, possibly thousands of bodies remaining underneath the debris".

The Red Cross said it would use Meulaboh as an aid staging post for the Sumatran west coast. The government of Singapore deployed two helicopter landing ships there.

The town was largely devastated, with around 80 percent of buildings destroyed and at least 10,000 dead out of the town's population of 50-60 thousand. Only 23,000 people could be accounted for a week after the tsunami, although many were not accounted for as they were residing in deserted houses instead of camps for displaced persons.

== Climate ==
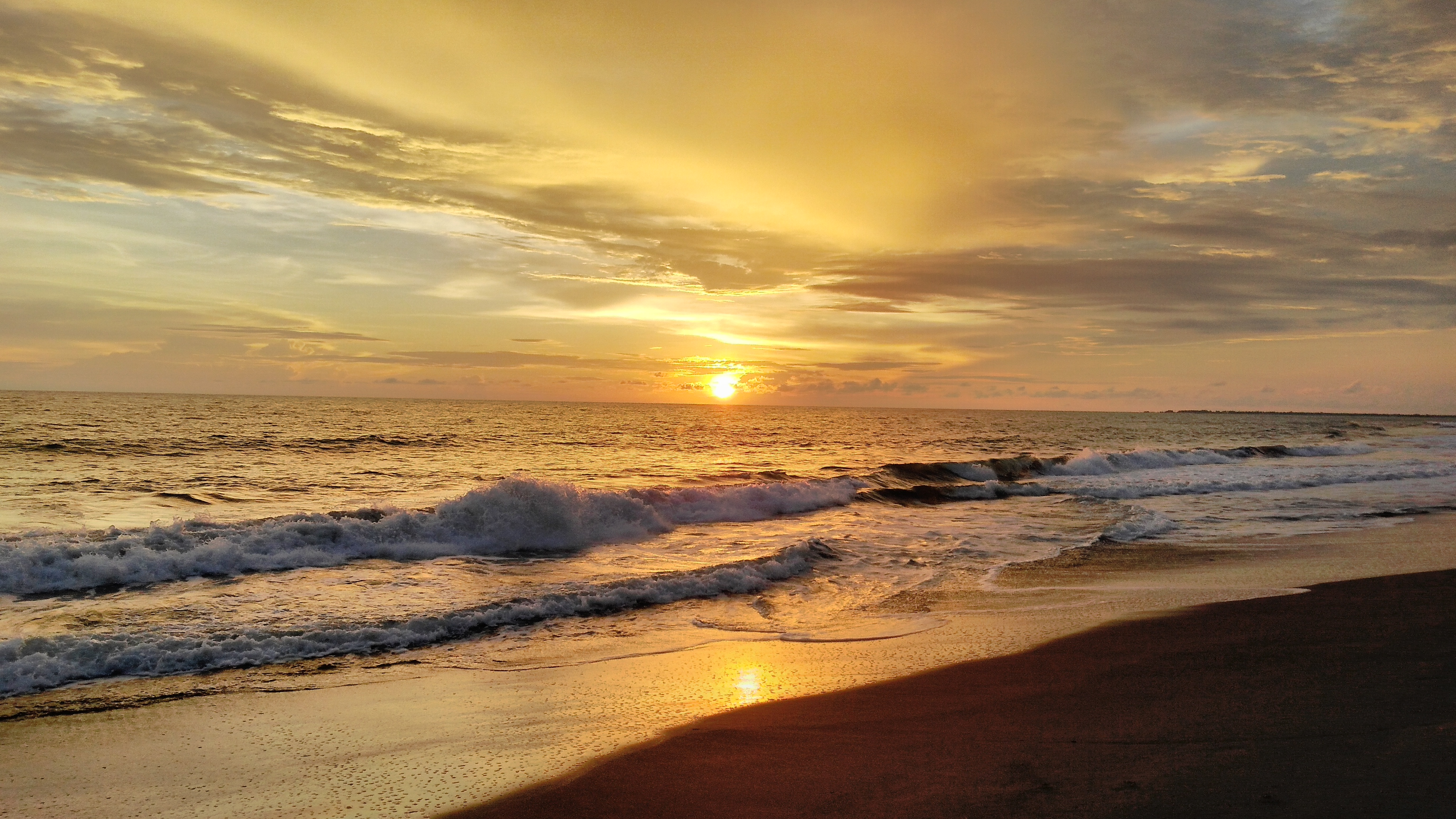
Sunset at Meulaboh beach

Meulaboh has a tropical rainforest climate (Af) with heavy to very heavy rainfall year-round.

Climate data for Meulaboh
Month	Jan	Feb	Mar	Apr	May	Jun	Jul	Aug	Sep	Oct	Nov	Dec	Year
Mean daily maximum °C (°F)	30.0 (86.0)	30.9 (87.6)	32.0 (89.6)	32.5 (90.5)	32.0 (89.6)	32.2 (90.0)	31.8 (89.2)	31.9 (89.4)	31.2 (88.2)	31.2 (88.2)	30.2 (86.4)	29.8 (85.6)	31.3 (88.4)
Daily mean °C (°F)	26.5 (79.7)	26.8 (80.2)	27.5 (81.5)	28.0 (82.4)	27.9 (82.2)	27.9 (82.2)	27.4 (81.3)	27.5 (81.5)	27.2 (81.0)	27.4 (81.3)	26.7 (80.1)	26.4 (79.5)	27.3 (81.1)
Mean daily minimum °C (°F)	23.0 (73.4)	22.8 (73.0)	23.0 (73.4)	23.6 (74.5)	23.8 (74.8)	23.6 (74.5)	23.0 (73.4)	23.2 (73.8)	23.2 (73.8)	23.7 (74.7)	23.3 (73.9)	23.1 (73.6)	23.3 (73.9)
Average rainfall mm (inches)	250 (9.8)	244 (9.6)	258 (10.2)	384 (15.1)	269 (10.6)	225 (8.9)	239 (9.4)	247 (9.7)	323 (12.7)	348 (13.7)	339 (13.3)	315 (12.4)	3,441 (135.4)
Source: Climate-Data.org

== See also ==
- Calang
- Gleebruk
- Leupung
- Tapaktuan
- Teunom
- Blangpidie
- Subulussalam
