= Suka Makmue =

Town in Aceh Province, Indonesia

Coordinates: 4°00′N 96°37′E

Suka Makmue is a town in Aceh province of Indonesia and the administrative seat (capital) of Nagan Raya Regency.
