= Mirwan M.S. =

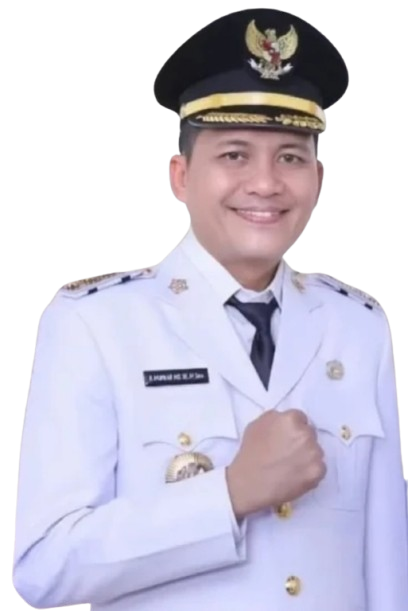

Regent of South Aceh
- Incumbent
- Assumed office 10 March 2026
- In office 17 February 2025 – 9 December 2025
- Preceded by: Amran
- Succeeded by: Baital Mukadis (acting)

Personal details
- Born: 9 March 1975 (age 51) South Aceh, Indonesia
- Party: Gerindra

Mirwan M.S. (born 9 March 1975) is an Indonesian politician of the Gerindra Party. He served as the regent of South Aceh Regency in Aceh from February 2025 until his temporary suspension in December 2025 due to his handling of flooding and landslides. He was reinstated in March 2026.

== Early life ==
Mirwan was born on 9 March 1975 at the village of Peuleumat, in East Labuhanbatu district of South Aceh Regency. He completed elementary school at his home village in 1989 and middle school in 1992, before moving to the provincial capital of Banda Aceh for high school where he graduated in 1995. He later received a bachelor's degree from an economic institute in 2014 and a master's degree from National University in Jakarta in 2021.

== Career ==
He worked for various private companies after completing high school. By 1998, he was working as a supervisor in a Jakarta company, and by 2010 he was director of a car showroom company.

=== South Aceh ===
In 2018, Mirwan ran as a regent candidate in South Aceh's election. Receiving the Aceh Party's support, he placed third out of seven candidates with 33,972 votes. He ran again in 2024, with Baital Mukadis as his running mate, and won the election with 47,346 votes (33.3%). They were sworn in on 17 February 2025.

In late November 2025, Cyclone Senyar struck Sumatra, causing widespread flooding and landslides across various areas including South Aceh. In South Aceh, 12 villages across 6 districts were impacted, with around 6 thousand residents displaced. On 27 November, Mirwan issued a statement claiming that he was unable to handle the disaster and requested aid from the provincial and central governments. He also requested a leave to head on an umrah trip to Saudi Arabia, and departed on 2 December despite an explicit denial of his leave by Aceh governor Muzakir Manaf.

Mirwan's departure to Saudi Arabia during the disaster resulted in widespread condemnation by both locals and national political figures. President Prabowo Subianto compared Mirwan's actions to desertion in the military, and ordered Minister of Home Affairs Tito Karnavian to fire him. On 9 December 2025, Tito announced that Mirwan would be suspended from his regent position for 3 months (the highest legally authorized penalty for an unsanctioned overseas visit). He was also fired from his Gerindra position as chairman of the party's South Aceh branch (a position he had been appointed to in April 2025 by Prabowo), although he remained a party member. He was reinstated as regent on 10 March 2026.

== Personal life ==
He is married to Devi Nafisah, who accompanied him during his December 2025 umrah. In April 2025, Mirwan donated a plot of land for the construction of an elementary school.
