= Nagan Raya Regency =

Regency in Aceh, Indonesia

Nagan Raya Regency Kabupaten Nagan Raya
- Regency
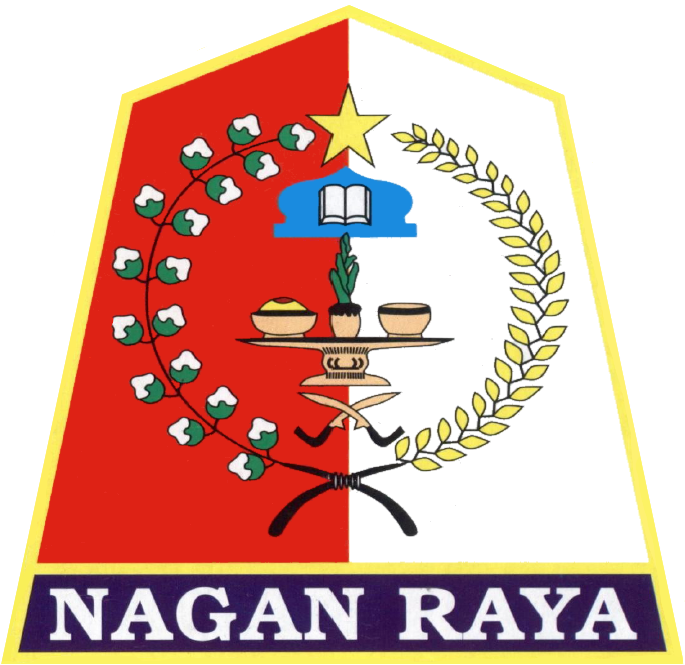
- Seal

- Location within Aceh

- Location in Aceh, Northern Sumatra, Sumatra and Indonesia Nagan Raya Regency (Northern Sumatra) Nagan Raya Regency (Sumatra) Nagan Raya Regency (Indonesia)
- Coordinates: 4°10′N 96°30′E
- Country: Indonesia
- Region: Sumatra
- Province: Aceh
- Established: 2002
- Regency seat: Suka Makmue

Government
  - Regent: Teuku Raja Keumangan
  - Vice Regent: Raja Sayang

Area
  - Total: 3,544.9 km^{2} (1,368.7 sq mi)

Population (mid 2025 estimate)
  - Total: 181,953
  - Density: 51.328/km^{2} (132.94/sq mi)
- Time zone: UTC+7 (IWST)
- Area code: (+62) 655
- Website: naganrayakab.go.id

Nagan Raya Regency (Indonesian: Kabupaten Nagan Raya) is a regency in the Aceh province of Indonesia. It is located on the island of Sumatra, and was formed on 10 April 2002 from districts formerly part of West Aceh Regency. The seat of the regency government is at Suka Makmue. The regency covers an area of 3,544.9 square kilometres and had a population of 139,663 people according to the 2010 Census and 168,392 at the 2020 Census. The official estimate as of mid 2025 was 181,953 (comprising 91,679 males and 90,274 females).

== Administrative districts ==
As at 2010, the regency was divided administratively into eight districts (kecamatan); however in 2011 two additional districts were created - Tripa Makmur (by division from Darul Makmur District) and Beutong Ateuh Banggalang (by division from Beutong District). Their areas (in km^{2}) and their populations at the 2010 Census and 2020 Census, together with the official estimates as of mid 2025, are listed below. The table also includes the locations of the district administrative centres, the number of villages (gampong) in each district, and its postal codes.

Kode Wilayah	Name of District (kecamatan)	Area in km^{2}	Pop'n Census 2010	Pop'n Census 2020	Pop'n Estimate mid 2025	Admin centre	No. of villages	Post codes
11.15.05	Darul Makmur	1,027.93	46,954	49,412	53,463	Alue Bilie	40	23662
11.15.09	Tripa Makmur	189.413	^{(a)}	9,038	10,087	Kabu	11	23663
11.15.01	Kuala	120.89	18,540	22,350	23,865	Ujong Fatihah	17	23661
11.15.07	Kuala Pesisir (Coastal Kuala)	76.34	14,110	17,338	18,724	Padang Rubek	16	23660
11.15.08	Tadu Raya	347.19	11,185	14,731	16,289	Alue Bata	22	23664
11.15.04	Beutong	1,017.32	14,228	13,701	14,864	Keude Seumot	24	23672
11.15.10	Beutong Ateuh; Banggalang	405.92	^{(b)}	1,990	2,248	Kuta Teungoh	4	23673
11.15.02	Seunagan	56.73	14,464	15,924	16,924	Jeuram	35	23671
11.15.06	Suka Makmue	51.56	8,022	9,931	10,517	Lueng Baro	19	23674
11.15.03	Seunagan Timur (East Seunagan)	251.61	12,160	13,977	14,972	Keude Linteung	34	23670
	Totals	3,544.90	139,663	168,392	181,953	Suka Makmue	222	

Notes: (a) included in 2010 figure for Darul Makmur District. (b) included in 2010 figure for Beutong District.

== Paddy fields ==
In 2012, Nagan Raya Regency has 24,698 hectares paddy fields with production of 164,586 tonnes of rice equivalent per year. Only a third of production is for regency's consumption and the rest is about 110,000 tonnes sold to other regencies and even to Medan, North Sumatra Province.

== See also ==
- List of regencies and cities of Indonesia
