= Aceh Jaya Regency =

Regency in Aceh, Indonesia

Aceh Jaya Regency Kabupaten Aceh Jaya
- Regency
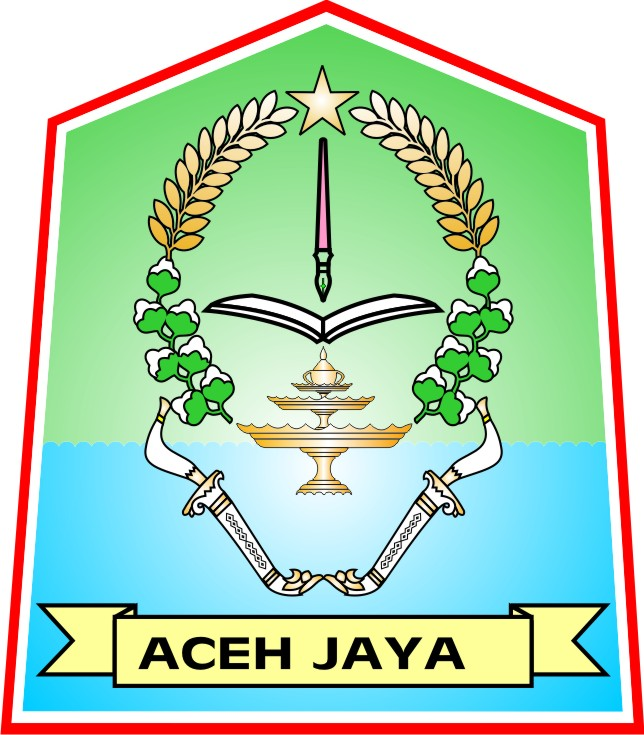
- Seal

- Location within Aceh

- Location in Aceh, Northern Sumatra, Sumatra and Indonesia Aceh Jaya Regency (Northern Sumatra) Aceh Jaya Regency (Sumatra) Aceh Jaya Regency (Indonesia)
- Coordinates: 4°49′N 95°40′E
- Country: Indonesia
- Region: Sumatra
- Province: Aceh
- Established: 2002
- Regency seat: Calang

Government
  - Regent: Safwandi
  - Vice Regent: Muslem D.

Area
  - Total: 3,872.23 km^{2} (1,495.08 sq mi)

Population (mid 2025 estimate)
  - Total: 102,475
  - Density: 26.4641/km^{2} (68.5416/sq mi)
- Time zone: UTC+7 (IWST)
- Area code: (+62) 654
- Website: acehjayakab.go.id

Aceh Jaya Regency (Indonesian: Kabupaten Aceh Jaya) is a regency of Aceh Province of Indonesia. It is located on the west side of the island of Sumatra, and was formed on 10 April 2002 from districts which had formerly been the northern part of West Aceh Regency. The regency covers an area of 3,872.23 square kilometres and had a population of 76,782 people at the 2010 census, 86,368 at the 2015 census and 93,159 at the 2020 Census, of whom 47,264 were male and 45,895 female; the official estimate as of mid 2025 was 102,475 (comprising 51,834 males and 50,641 females). The seat of the Regency is at Calang, in Krueng Sabee District. The main crops grown in the Regency are rice, rambutan, durian, orange, water melon, rubber, palm and coconut oil.

== Administrative divisions ==
As at 2010, the regency was divided administratively into six districts (kecamatan); however, three additional districts (Indra Jaya, Darul Hikmah and Pasie Raya) were subsequently created by the division of existing districts. The nine districts, listed below with their areas and their populations at the 2010 Census and the 2020 Census, together with the official estimates as of mid 2025. The table also includes the locations of the district administrative centres, the number of villages (Aceh: gampong) in each, and the district post code.

| Kode Wilayah | Name of District (kecamatan) | Area in km^{2} | Pop'n Census 2010 | Pop'n Census 2020 | Pop'n Estimate mid 2025 | Admin centre | No. of villages | Post code |
|---|---|---|---|---|---|---|---|---|
| 11/14/01 | Teunom | 231.49 | 17,090 | 13,471 | 14,969 | Tuenom | 22 | 23653 |
| 11.14.09 | Pasie Raya | 338.52 | ^{(a)} | 6,824 | 7,566 | Tuwi Kareung | 14 | 23653 |
| 11.14.06 | Panga | 535.62 | 6,546 | 8,513 | 9,401 | Keude Panga | 20 | 23653 |
| 11.14.02 | Krueng Sabee ^{(b)} | 687.87 | 14,247 | 17,814 | 19,845 | Krueng Sabee | 17 | 23654 |
| 11.14.03 | Setia Bhakti ^{(b)} | 469.90 | 7,512 | 9,073 | 10,129 | Lageun | 13 | 23655 |
| 11.14.04 | Sampoi Niet ^{(c)} | 457.13 | 11,959 | 7,910 | 8,781 | Lhok Kruet | 19 | 23659 |
| 11.14.08 | Darul Hikmah | 395.60 | ^{(a)} | 6,891 | 7,680 | Pajar | 19 | 23656 |
| 11.14.05 | Jaya ^{(c)} | 453.37 | 19,428 | 15,187 | 16,309 | Lamno | 34 | 23658 |
| 11.14.07 | Indra Jaya | 302.60 | ^{(a)} | 7,476 | 7,795 | Kuta Bahagia | 14 | 23657 |
| | Totals | 3,872.23 | 76,782 | 93,159 | 102,475 | Calang | 172 | |

Note: (a) the 2010 populations of the new districts are included in the totals for the districts from which they were divided. (b) includes three small offshore islands. (c) includes a small offshore island.

== Earthquake ==
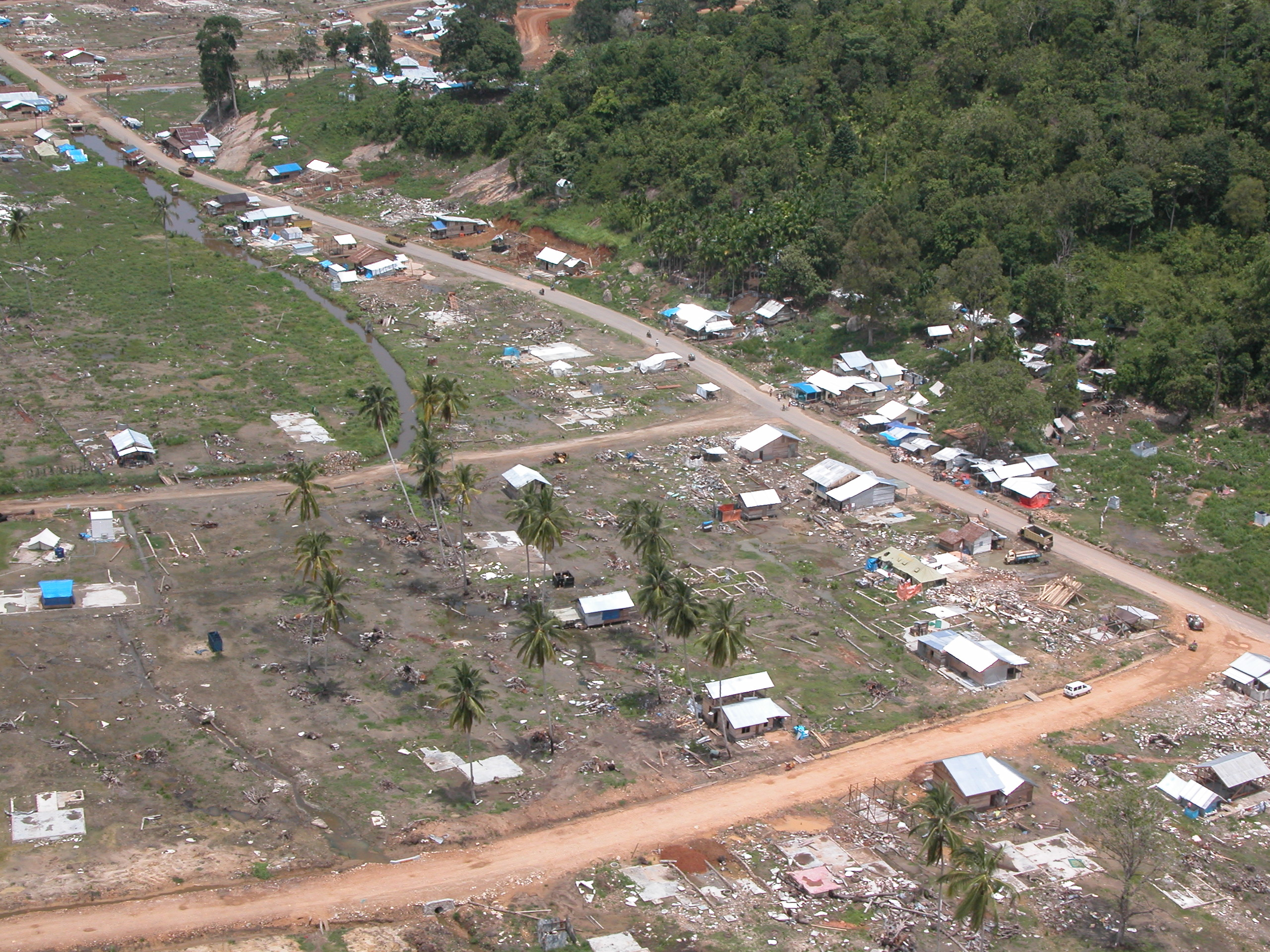
Calang after being affected by the Indian Ocean earthquake

On December 26, 2004, the regency was affected by the Indian Ocean earthquake, with much of the administrative capital at Calang being destroyed. The Indonesian Government announced that a rebuilt Calang would be sited further inland, although individual families and businesses were rebuilding at the same location along the coast. By October 2006 substantial parts of the town of Calang had been reconstructed, including a small hotel and a number of restaurants and other businesses. By the end of 2006 a total of 15,000 houses and 57,000 permanent houses had been reconstructed in the regency. Many people along the coast are still in transitional housing but progress has been made by the various local and many international organizations such as the Red Cross and USAID who are assisting with the reconstruction.
