= West Aceh Regency =

Regency in Aceh, Indonesia

West Aceh Regency Kabupaten Aceh Barat
- Regency
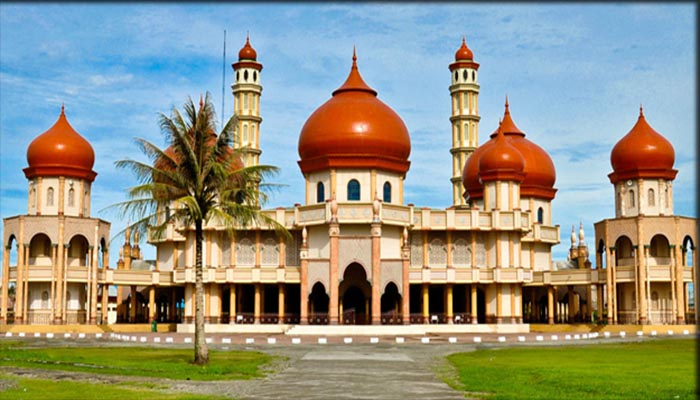
- Meulaboh great mosque

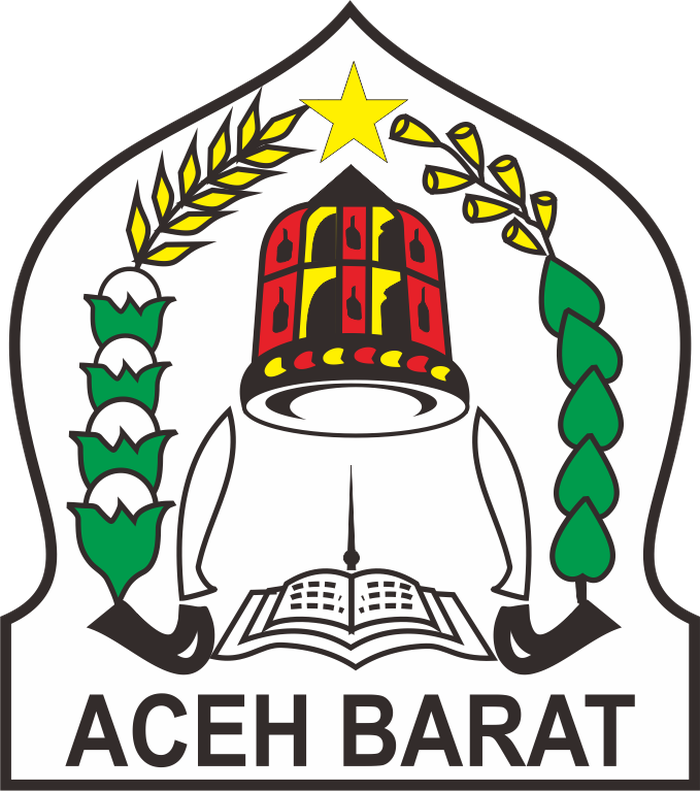
- Coat of arms

- Location within Aceh

- Location in Aceh, Northern Sumatra, Sumatra and Indonesia West Aceh Regency (Northern Sumatra) West Aceh Regency (Sumatra) West Aceh Regency (Indonesia)
- Coordinates: 4°27′N 96°11′E
- Country: Indonesia
- Region: Sumatra
- Province: Aceh
- Established: 1956
- Regency seat: Meulaboh

Government
  - Regent: Tarmizi
  - Vice Regent: Said Fadheil

Area
  - Total: 2,927.95 km^{2} (1,130.49 sq mi)

Population (mid 2025 estimate)
  - Total: 210,979
  - Density: 72.0569/km^{2} (186.627/sq mi)
- Time zone: UTC+7 (IWST)
- Area code: (+62) 655
- Website: acehbaratkab.go.id

West Aceh Regency (Indonesian: Kabupaten Aceh Barat) is a regency in the Aceh Province of Indonesia. It is located on the island of Sumatra. The regency formerly covered a much larger area, but on 4 October 1999 the districts on the island of Simeulue were separated out to form their own regency, and on 10 April 2002 two additional regencies - Aceh Jaya and Nagan Raya - were created from parts of West Aceh; the residual regency currently covers an area of 2,927.95 square kilometres and had a population of 173,558 at the 2010 Census and 198,736 at the 2020 Census; the official estimate as of mid 2025 was 210,979 (comprising 106,286 males and 104,693 females).

The town of Meulaboh remains the seat of the regency government (notwithstanding incorrect reports that on 8 July 2013 it was separated out as an independent city). The regency is a palm oil-producing area. While the majority of the population are Acehnese people, some of the people of the regency are Minangkabau-descended Aneuk Jamee.

The regency was among the hardest-hit areas during the 2004 Indian Ocean earthquake.

The regency is bordered by the regencies of Aceh Jaya to the west, Pidie to the north, Central Aceh to the northeast, and Nagan Raya to the southeast, and by the Indian Ocean to the southwest.

== Administrative districts ==
The regency was divided administratively into twelve districts (kecamatan), listed below with their areas and populations at the 2010 Census and the 2020 Census, together with the official estimates as of mid 2025. The table also includes the location of the district administrative centres, and the number of administrative villages (gampong) in each district, and its post code.

Kode Wilayah	Name of District (kecamatan)	Area in km^{2}	Pop'n Census 2010	Pop'n Census 2020	Pop'n Estimate mid 2025	Admin centre	No. of villages	Post code
11.05.01	Johan Pahlawan	44.91	56,050	64,646	66,536	Meulaboh	21	23617 & 23618
11.05.05	Samatiga	140.69	13,322	15,656	16,596	Suak Timah	32	23650
11.05.06	Bubon	129.58	6,545	6,817	7,213	Banda Layung	17	23651
11.05.07	Arongan Lambalek	130.06	10,609	11,871	12,622	Drien Rampak	27	23652
11.05.04	Woyla	249.04	12,073	13,576	14,567	Kuala Bhee	43	23654
11.05.10	Woyla Barat (West Woyla)	123.00	6,858	7,837	8,263	Pasi Mali	24	23682
11.05.11	Woyla Timur (East Woyla)	132.60	4,138	5,144	5,534	Tangkeh	26	23683
11.05.02	Kaway XVI	510.18	18,753	21,216	22,462	Keudee Aron	44	23681
11.05.09	Meureubo	112.87	26,510	30,066	32,982	Meureubo	26	23615
11.05.08	Pantai Ceuremen	490.25	9,635	11,133	12,332	Pante Ceureumen	25	23680
11.05.12	Panton Reu	83.04	5,671	6,586	7,070	Meutulang	19	23684
11.05.03	Sungai Mas	781.73	3,394	4,188	4,802	Kajeung	18	23685
	Totals	2,927.95	173,558	198,736	210,979	Meulaboh	322	

== See also ==
- List of regencies and cities of Indonesia
