= South Aceh Regency =

Regency in Aceh, Indonesia

South Aceh Regency Kabupaten Aceh Selatan
- Regency
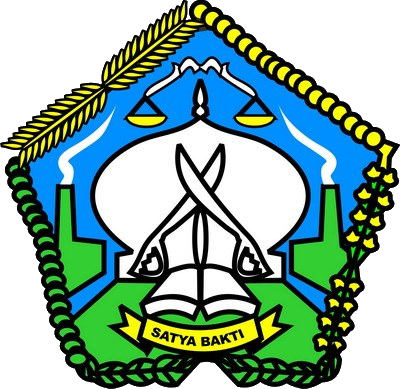
- Seal
- Motto: Satya Bakti (Loyal and Devout)
- Location within Aceh

- Location in Northern Sumatra, Sumatra and Indonesia South Aceh Regency (Sumatra) South Aceh Regency (Indonesia)
- Coordinates: 3°15′17″N 97°10′27″E
- Country: Indonesia
- Region: Sumatra
- Province: Aceh
- Established: 1956
- Regency seat: Tapaktuan

Government
  - Regent: Mirwan MS
  - Vice Regent: Baital Mukadis

Area
  - Total: 4,173.82 km^{2} (1,611.52 sq mi)

Population (mid 2025 estimate)
  - Total: 240,613
  - Density: 57.6481/km^{2} (149.308/sq mi)
- Time zone: UTC+7 (IWST)
- Area code: (+62) 656
- Website: acehselatankab.go.id

South Aceh Regency (Indonesian: Kabupaten Aceh Selatan; Indonesian pronunciation: [kabuˌpat̪ɛn ˌ(ʔ)at͡ʃɛh səˈlat̪an]) is a regency in the Aceh province of Indonesia. It is located on the west coast of the island of Sumatra. The regency covers an area of 4,173.82 square kilometres and had a population of 202,251 at the 2010 Census and 232,414 at the 2020 Census; the official population estimate in mid 2025 was 240,613 (comprising 120,527 males and 120,086 females). Its population density was thus 48.5 inhabitants/km^{2} at the 2010 census, 55.7 inhabitants/km^{2} at the 2020 census, and 57.6 inhabitants/km^{2} in mid 2025. The seat of the regency government is at Tapaktuan.

== Demography ==
Some 60% of the regency's population are ethically the Acehnese, some 30% of the people of the regency are the Minangkabau-descended Aneuk Jamee, and about 10% are ethnically the Kluet people.

== History ==
South Aceh Regency was originally created on 14 November 1956 (under Emergency Law No.7 of 1956) from the former southeastern districts of West Aceh Regency. On 20 April 1999 (under Law No.14 of 1999) its own southeastern districts were in turn split off to create a separate Aceh Singkil Regency, and it was further reduced in size on 10 April 2002 (under Law No.4 of 2002) by further districts in the northwest of the regency being split off to create a Southwest Aceh Regency.

== Administrative districts ==
At the time of the 2010 Census, the regency was divided administratively into sixteen districts (kecamatan). Later in 2010, two additional districts (Trumon Tengah and Kota Bahagia) were carved out of the existing districts. The districts are listed below with their areas and populations at the 2010 Census and the 2020 Census, together with the official estimates for mid 2025. The districts are grouped into five geographical units, which have no administrative significance. The table also includes the locations of the district administrative centres, the number of villages (gampong) in each district, and its postal codes.

Kode Kemendagri	Name of District (kecamatan)	Area in km^{2}	Pop'n Census 2010	Pop'n Census 2020	Pop'n Estimate mid 2025	Admin centre	No. of villages	Post codes
11.01.09	Trumon ^{(a)}	765.92	5,614	6,025	6,587	Keude Trumon	12	23774
11.01.16	Trumon Timur (East Trumon)	285.34	10,340	8,528	9,493	Krueng Luas	8	23776
11.01.18	Trumon Tengah (Central Trumon)	123.50	^{(b)}	6,692	7,532	Ladang Rimba	10	23775
	Subtotal Trumon area ^{(c)}	1,174.76	15,954	21,245	23,612		30	
11.01.01	Bakongan ^{(d)}	57.62	10,913	5,364	5,677	Bakongan	7	23773
11.01.15	Bakongan Timur (East Bakongan)	73.81	5,208	6,177	6,599	Seubadeh	7	23777
11.01.17	Kota Bahagia (Bahagia Town)	244.63	^{(e)}	7,006	7,672	Bukit Gadeng	10	23778
	Subtotal Bakongan area	376.06	16,121	18,547	19,948		24	
11.01.03	Kluet Selatan (South Kluet)	106.58	12,477	14,380	14,887	Kandang	17	23772
11.01.14	Kluet Timur (East Kluet)	449.03	9,418	10,541	10,999	Paya Dapur	9	23779
11.01.02	Kluet Utara (North Kluet)	73.24	22,271	24,864	25,766	Kota Fajar	21	23771
11.01.10	Pasie Raja	98.11	15,500	18,038	18,544	Ladang Tuha	21	23755
11.01.13	Kluet Tengah (Central Kluet)	801.08	6,120	7,503	8,111	Manggamat	13	23770
	Subtotal Kluet area	1,528.04	65,786	75,326	78,307		81	
11.01.08	Tapaktuan	100.73	22,540	23,190	22,431	Tapaktuan	18	23711 - 23718
11.01.06	Samadua	112.91	14,440	16,055	16,614	Samadua	28	23752
11.01.07	Sawang ^{(f)}	189.38	13,679	15,968	16,288	Sawang	15	23753
11.01.05	Meukek	465.06	18,261	20,956	21,538	Meukek	23	23754
	Subtotal Central area	868.08	68,920	76,169	76,871		84	
11.01.04	Labuhan Haji	54.83	11,823	13,389	13,628	Labuhan Haji	16	23761
11.01.11	Labuhan Haji Timur (East Labuhan Haji)	95.50	9,137	10,032	10,277	Peulumat	12	23758
11.01.12	Labuhan Haji Barat (West Labuhan Haji)	76.56	15,495	17,706	17,970	Blang Keujeren	15	23757
	Subtotal Labuhan Haji area	226.89	36,455	41,127	41,875		43	
	Totals for regency	4,173.82	202,251	232,414	240,613	Tapaktuan	260	

Note: (a) including small offshore islands including Pulau Trumon.
(b) The 2010 population of Trumon Tengah District is included in the 2010 figure for Trumon Timur District, from which it was split.
(c) The Trumon area which covers the southern 28% of the Regency is adjacent to the city of Subulussalam to the east.
(d) including offshore island of Pulau Kayee.
(e) The 2010 population of Kota Bahagia District is included in the 2010 figure for Bakongan District, from which it was split.
(f) including offshore island of Pulau Batukapal.

== See also ==
- List of regencies and cities of Indonesia
