= Tapaktuan =

Town in Aceh, Indonesia

- City
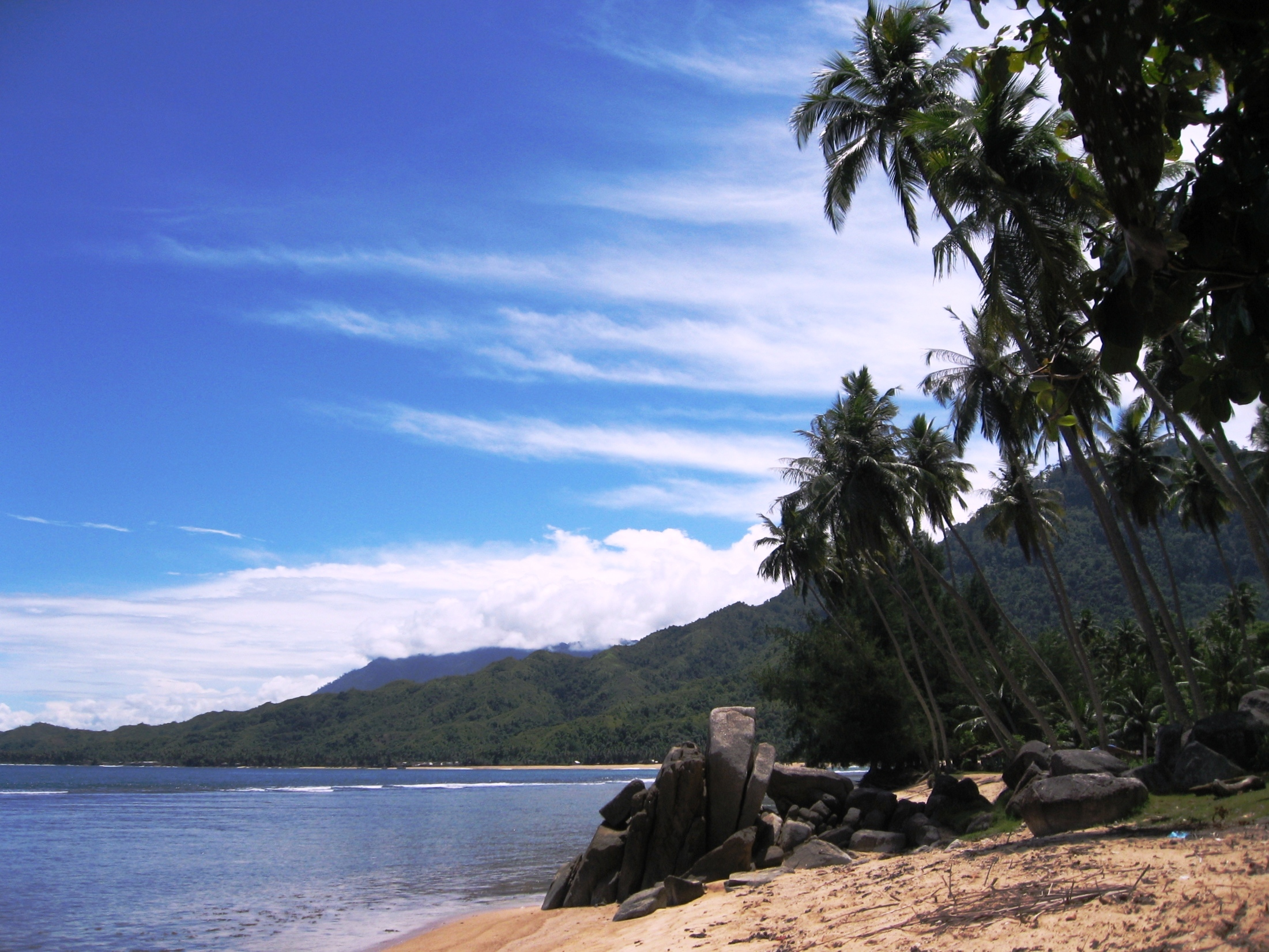
- A beach in Tapaktuan

- Location in Northern Sumatra, Sumatra and Indonesia Tapaktuan (Sumatra) Tapaktuan (Indonesia)
- Coordinates: 3°15′29″N 97°10′48″E
- Country: Indonesia
- Region: Sumatra
- Province: Aceh

Area
  - Total: 106.99 km^{2} (41.31 sq mi)

Population (2023 estimate)
  - Total: 22,352
  - Density: 208.92/km^{2} (541.09/sq mi)
- Time zone: UTC+7 (IWST)
- Area code: (+62) 627

Tapaktuan is a town and administrative district (kecamatan) in the southwest of Aceh province of Indonesia. The town is the capital (seat of the government) of South Aceh Regency. The district covers a land area of 106.99 km^{2}, which is subdivided into 18 towns and villages (gampong). According to the official estimates for 2023, it has a population of 22,352.

== Climate ==
Tapaktuan has a tropical rainforest climate (Af) with heavy to very heavy rainfall year-round.

Climate data for Tapaktuan
Month	Jan	Feb	Mar	Apr	May	Jun	Jul	Aug	Sep	Oct	Nov	Dec	Year
Mean daily maximum °C (°F)	30.9 (87.6)	31.7 (89.1)	32.2 (90.0)	32.5 (90.5)	32.6 (90.7)	32.6 (90.7)	32.3 (90.1)	32.2 (90.0)	31.5 (88.7)	31.3 (88.3)	30.7 (87.3)	30.6 (87.1)	31.8 (89.2)
Daily mean °C (°F)	26.5 (79.7)	26.8 (80.2)	27.2 (81.0)	27.6 (81.7)	27.8 (82.0)	27.5 (81.5)	27.1 (80.8)	27.2 (81.0)	26.9 (80.4)	27.0 (80.6)	26.6 (79.9)	26.5 (79.7)	27.1 (80.7)
Mean daily minimum °C (°F)	22.1 (71.8)	22.0 (71.6)	22.3 (72.1)	22.8 (73.0)	23.0 (73.4)	22.5 (72.5)	22.0 (71.6)	22.2 (72.0)	22.4 (72.3)	22.7 (72.9)	22.5 (72.5)	22.4 (72.3)	22.4 (72.3)
Average rainfall mm (inches)	251 (9.9)	213 (8.4)	323 (12.7)	350 (13.8)	246 (9.7)	178 (7.0)	197 (7.8)	227 (8.9)	267 (10.5)	344 (13.5)	353 (13.9)	301 (11.9)	3,250 (128)
Source: Climate-Data.org
