= Mount Abong-Abong =

Mountain in Indonesia

- Location within Sumatra

Highest point
- Elevation: 2,985 m (9,793 ft)
- Listing: Ribu
- Coordinates: 4°14′27.96″N 96°47′40.2″E

Geography
- Location: Central Aceh, Aceh, Indonesia
- Parent range: Bukit Barisan

Geology
- Mountain type: Stratovolcano
- Volcanic arc: Sunda Arc

Mount Abong-Abong or Mount Abongabong is a mountain located in Central Aceh Regency, Aceh Province, Indonesia, with an elevation of 2,985 m (9,793 ft). At the summit, there is a Dutch-era triangulation pillar marked with the serial number P.127. Mount Abong-Abong is located in the Bukit Barisan range, which stretches across several Regencies in Aceh, including Central Aceh Regency, Gayo Lues Regency and Nagan Raya Regency.

Mount Abongabong is part of the Tripa watershed region, with its main water flow directed toward the western coast of Sumatra Island, draining into the Indian Ocean.

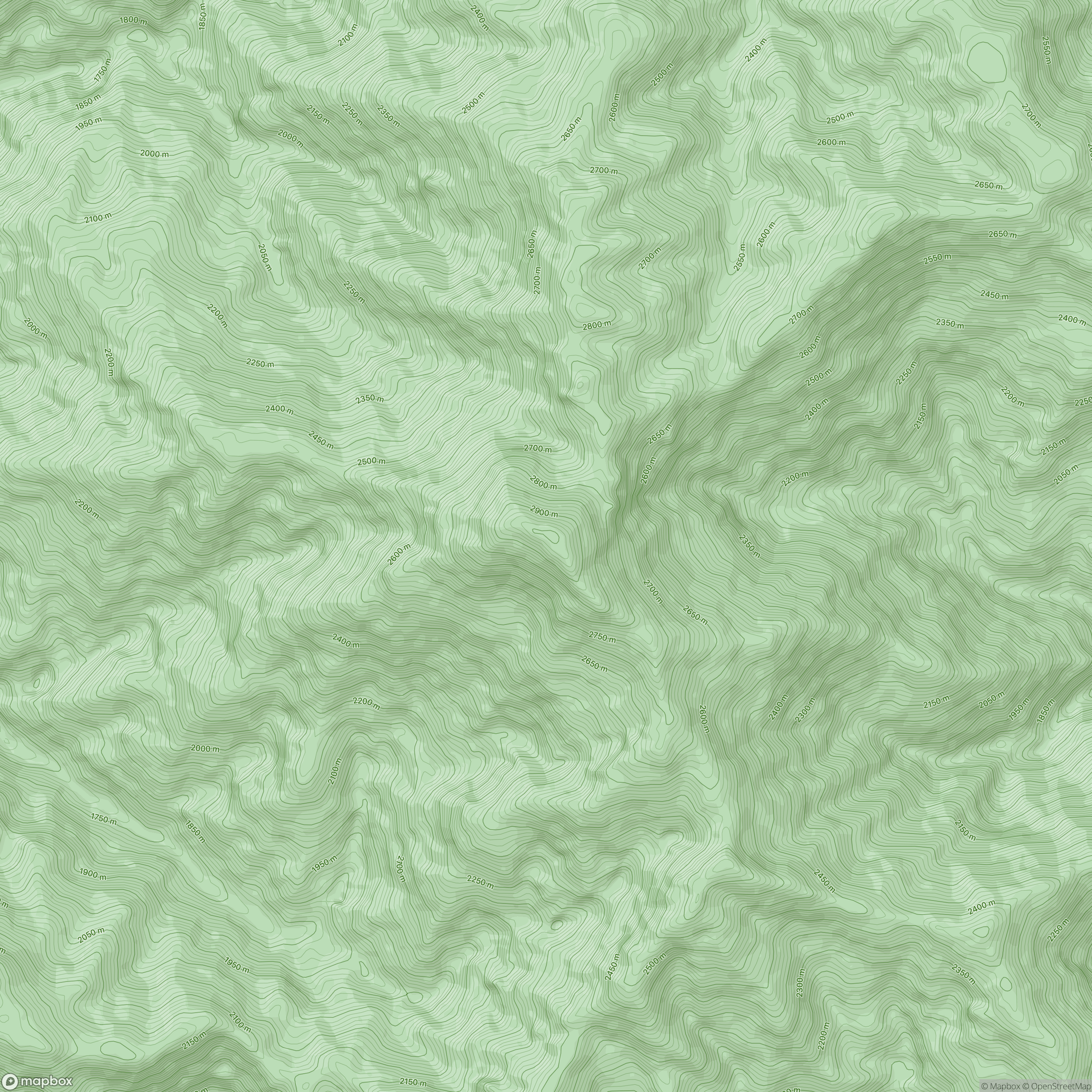
Topographic map of Mount Abongabong, 2985 meters above sea level, Aceh
