= Bener, Gayo Lues =

Bener
- Location in Aceh and Indonesia Bener (Indonesia)
- Coordinates: 3°45′41.06″N 97°13′14.63″E
- Country: Indonesia
- Province: Aceh
- Regency: Gayo Lues Regency
- District: Kuta Panjang District
- Elevation: 9,731 ft (2,966 m)

Population (2010)
  - Total: 577
- Time zone: UTC+7 (Indonesia Western Standard Time)

Bener is a village in Kuta Panjang district, Gayo Lues Regency in Aceh province, Indonesia. Its population is 577.

== Climate ==
Bener has a cold subtropical highland climate (Cfb) with moderate to heavy rainfall year-round. It is the coldest populated place in Sumatra.

Climate data for Bener
Month	Jan	Feb	Mar	Apr	May	Jun	Jul	Aug	Sep	Oct	Nov	Dec	Year
Mean daily maximum °C (°F)	16.6 (61.9)	17.2 (63.0)	16.9 (62.4)	16.4 (61.5)	16.2 (61.2)	15.7 (60.3)	15.2 (59.4)	15.3 (59.5)	15.1 (59.2)	15.0 (59.0)	15.3 (59.5)	16.4 (61.5)	15.9 (60.7)
Daily mean °C (°F)	11.7 (53.1)	11.8 (53.2)	11.6 (52.9)	11.4 (52.5)	11.1 (52.0)	10.8 (51.4)	10.3 (50.5)	10.4 (50.7)	10.5 (50.9)	10.8 (51.4)	11.0 (51.8)	11.7 (53.1)	11.1 (52.0)
Mean daily minimum °C (°F)	6.8 (44.2)	6.4 (43.5)	6.3 (43.3)	6.5 (43.7)	6.1 (43.0)	5.9 (42.6)	5.4 (41.7)	5.5 (41.9)	5.9 (42.6)	6.6 (43.9)	6.8 (44.2)	7.1 (44.8)	6.3 (43.3)
Average precipitation mm (inches)	179 (7.0)	138 (5.4)	234 (9.2)	240 (9.4)	177 (7.0)	82 (3.2)	81 (3.2)	111 (4.4)	174 (6.9)	238 (9.4)	240 (9.4)	215 (8.5)	2,109 (83)
Source: Climate-Data.org
