= Tingkem =

- Location in Aceh and Indonesia Tingkem (Indonesia)
- Coordinates: 3°57′40.3″N 97°8′35.0″E
- Country: Indonesia
- Province: Aceh
- Regency: Gayo Lues Regency
- District: Blang Jerango District
- Elevation: 7,635 ft (2,327 m)

Population (2010)
  - Total: 215
- Time zone: UTC+7 (Indonesia Western Standard Time)

Tingkem is a village in Blang Jerango district, Gayo Lues Regency in Aceh province, Indonesia. Its population is 215.

== Climate ==
Tingkem has a cold subtropical highland climate (Cfb) with moderate to heavy rainfall year-round.

Climate data for Tingkem
Month	Jan	Feb	Mar	Apr	May	Jun	Jul	Aug	Sep	Oct	Nov	Dec	Year
Mean daily maximum °C (°F)	19.7 (67.5)	20.5 (68.9)	20.4 (68.7)	20.1 (68.2)	20.1 (68.2)	19.6 (67.3)	19.0 (66.2)	19.2 (66.6)	18.7 (65.7)	18.6 (65.5)	18.8 (65.8)	19.6 (67.3)	19.5 (67.2)
Daily mean °C (°F)	14.9 (58.8)	15.0 (59.0)	15.1 (59.2)	15.1 (59.2)	14.9 (58.8)	14.4 (57.9)	13.9 (57.0)	14.1 (57.4)	14.0 (57.2)	14.2 (57.6)	14.5 (58.1)	14.9 (58.8)	14.6 (58.3)
Mean daily minimum °C (°F)	10.1 (50.2)	9.6 (49.3)	9.8 (49.6)	10.1 (50.2)	9.8 (49.6)	9.3 (48.7)	8.9 (48.0)	9.0 (48.2)	9.4 (48.9)	9.9 (49.8)	10.2 (50.4)	10.3 (50.5)	9.7 (49.4)
Average rainfall mm (inches)	176 (6.9)	131 (5.2)	223 (8.8)	221 (8.7)	165 (6.5)	77 (3.0)	74 (2.9)	104 (4.1)	167 (6.6)	233 (9.2)	242 (9.5)	219 (8.6)	2,032 (80)
Source: Climate-Data.org
