= Rasbora tawarensis =

Conservation status
- Critically Endangered (IUCN 3.1)

Scientific classification
- Kingdom: Animalia
- Phylum: Chordata
- Class: Actinopterygii
- Division: Teleostei
- Order: Cypriniformes
- Family: Danionidae
- Subfamily: Rasborinae
- Genus: Rasbora
- Species: R. tawarensis

Binomial name
- Rasbora tawarensis M. C. W. Weber & de Beaufort, 1916

Species of fish

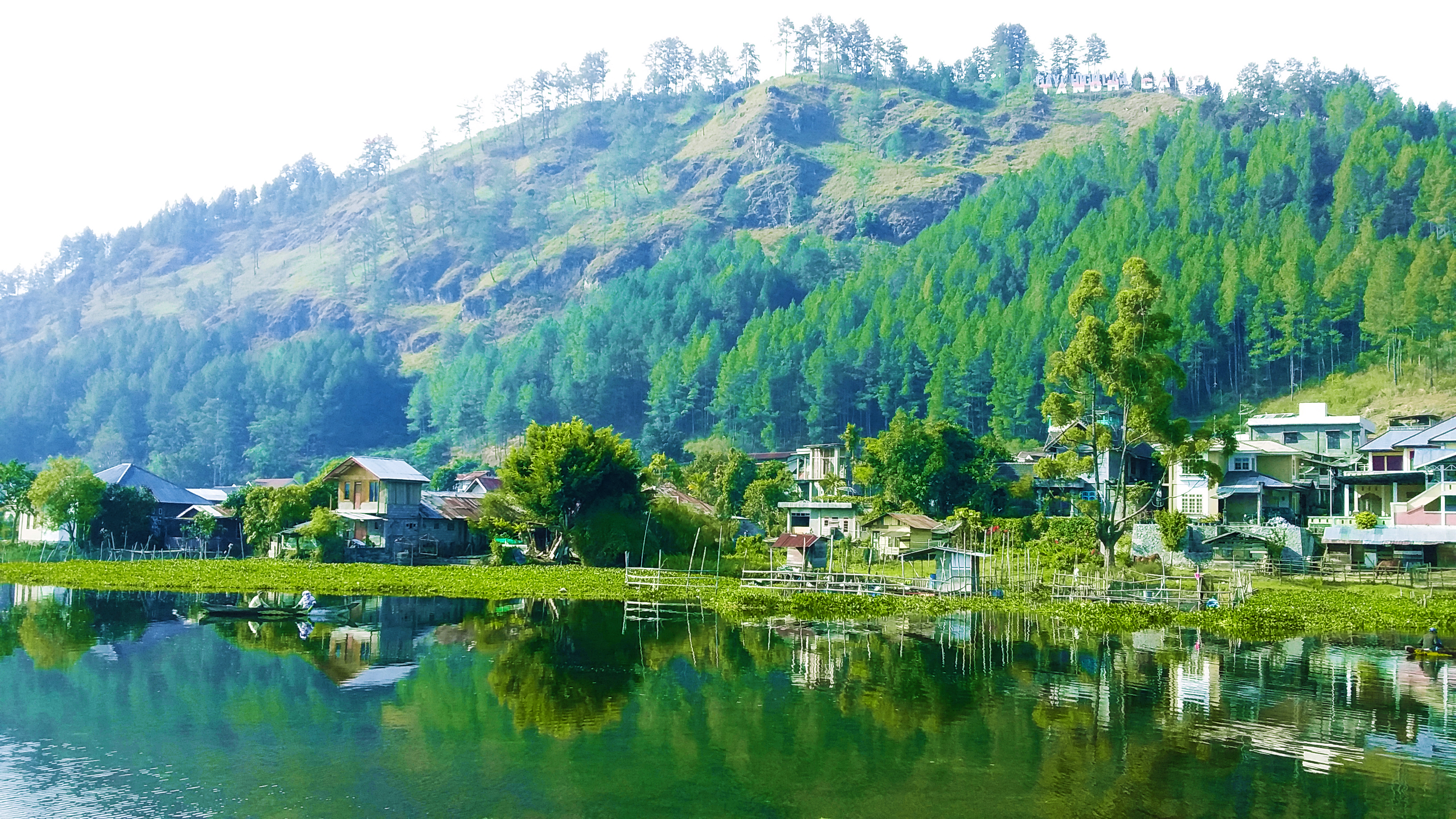
Lake Laut Tawar

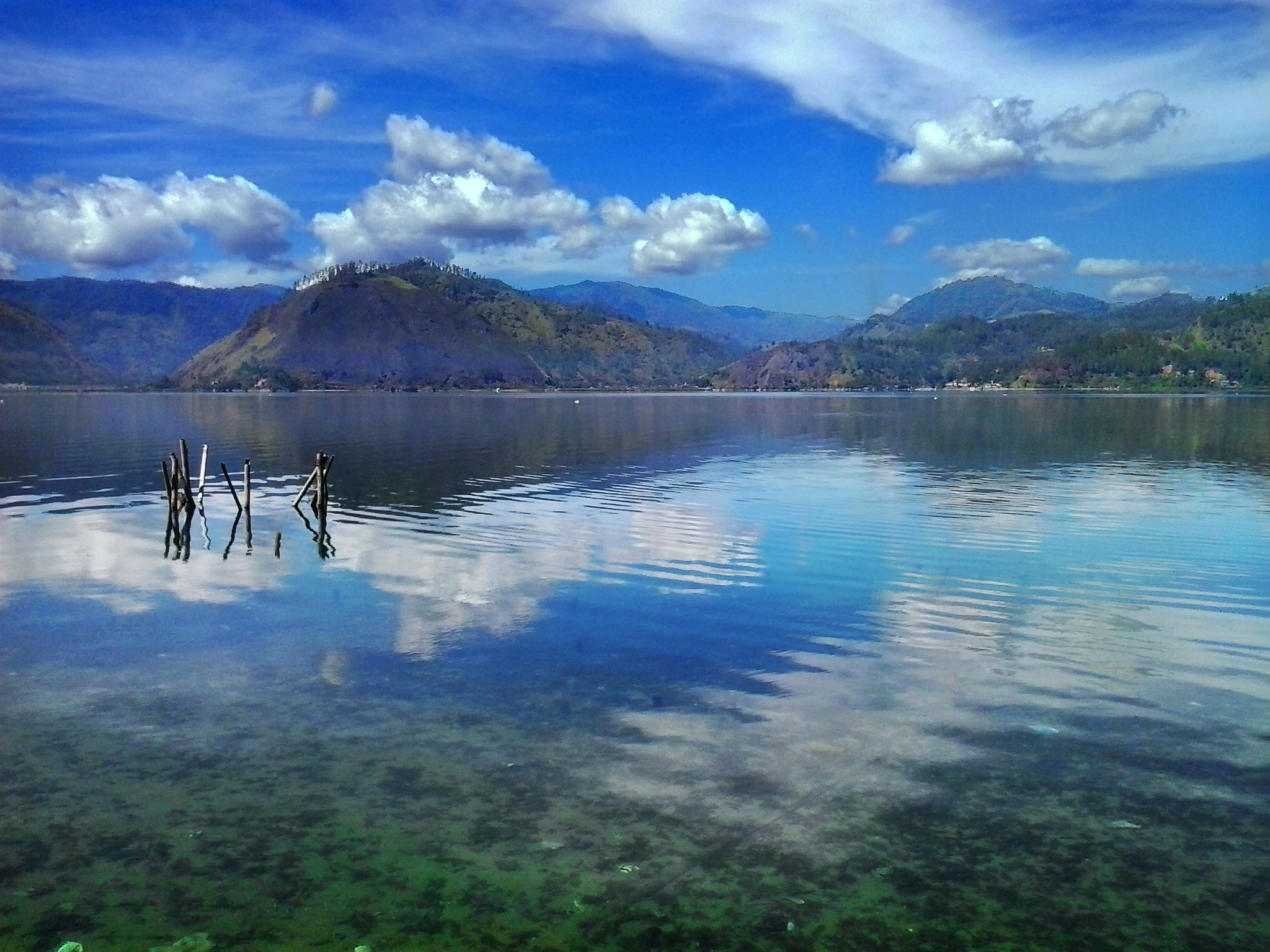
Lake Laut Tawar

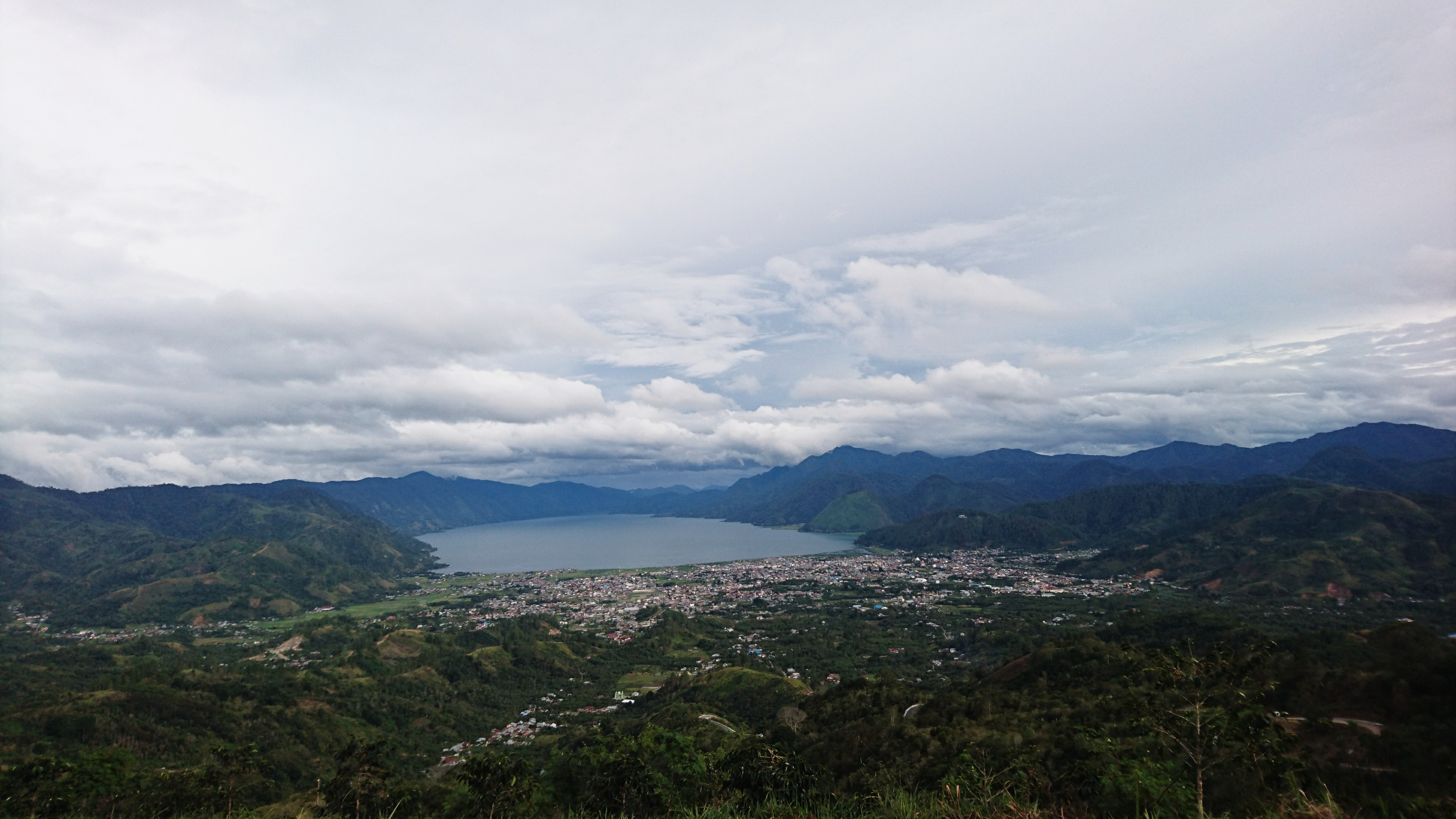
Takengon, Central Aceh Tengah Regency

Rasbora tawarensis, locally known as depik, is a critically endangered species of cyprinid fish. It is endemic to Lake Laut Tawar in Indonesia, where its population is rapidly decreasing due to ecological disturbances, global warming, introduced species, unlawful fishing practices, and pollution.

== Description ==
There are approximately 60 species of Rasbora fish that have been described worldwide, one being Rasbora tawarensis, or depik. It is a freshwater fish that lives in small rivers, lakes, peat swamps, and rice fields. Depik characteristics are generally similar to anchovies: it has a small and oval body, a black back, and a white belly. In addition to resembling anchovies, depik is also similar to Relo (Rasbora tawarensis) and Eas (Rasbora argyrotaenia), which are common to Lake Laut Tawar. These three species have similarly small bodies, but different colors; the depik's body is softer and the eyes are smaller compared to the other two species.

Depik is listed in the IUCN Red List as vulnerable and updated by CBSG as critically endangered due to the very restricted area of its distribution. Its population is decreasing, as indicated by decreasing catch-per-unit effort (CPUE). The average CPUE decreased from 1.17 kg/m^{2} in the 1970s to 0.02 kg/m^{2} in 2009.

== Geographical information ==
With a surface area of about 57 km^{2}, Laut Tawar is the largest lake in Aceh Province. The lake is located in the Gayo plateau about 1,200 meters above sea level. It was formed by the Dorman volcano, and is surrounded by Mount Bukit Barisan with its highest peak around 2,000 meters above sea level. There are approximately 25 small rivers that flow into the lake, originating from 18 catchment areas, with the discharge varying between 11 and 2554 L/s. The Peusangan River is the only outlet. The lake is surrounded by forests that have undergone intensive logging. Plantations, rice fields, and human settlements have a negative impact on the ecology of the lake. The lake plays an important role for the indigenous Gayo tribe, such as being a source of clean water, irrigation, industry, and fisheries.

== Ecosystem ==
=== Physical aspects ===
The average water temperature in Lake Laut Tawar ranges from 21.55 to 19.35 °C, measured during the day at a depth of 1–50 meters.

Average temperature in Lake Laut Tawar
Depth (m)	T (°C)
1	21.55
5	21.37
10	21.15
20	20.70
50	19.35

The electrical conductivity (EC) of Lake Laut Tawar water ranges from 181.37 to 205.01 μS with a water brightness level (WTL) of 1.29 – 2.92 m, and the water salinity is zero.

EC value and WTL of Lake Laut Tawar
Average DHL (μS)	Water brightness (m)
188.20	2.27
181.37	1.79
205.01	2.92
192.53	2.06
191.131	1.29

The variation in temperature values indicates that there are abiotic factors that influence it, such as weather, wind, and currents. The optimum temperature range for fish growth in the waters is 20–30 °C. The temperature in the water significantly affects the presence of fish: if the temperature is too high it can induce stress in the fish and increase their metabolic rate.

Water brightness is a factor that indicates the ability of light to penetrate a layer of water at a certain depth. In natural waters, brightness is correlated with photosynthetic activity and primary production in water. The factor affecting the brightness is clarity, which is determined by the dissolved particles in the mud. When more particles or organic matter dissolve, turbidity increases, which reduces the feeding efficiency of organisms.

The low brightness value is caused by cloudy water conditions, which originate from large numbers of suspended solids from domestic waste and other activities around the area, and the lack of substrate binding due to the absence of mangroves such that light does not penetrate to the bottom of the water. Good brightness values for fish life are greater than 0.45 m.

Due to its high location, Lake Laut Tawar has a temperature lower than the minimum temperature, which favors the growth of aquatic organisms. The average evaporation around the lake ranges from 3.9 mm/day to 3.4 mm/day from October to December and 4.7 mm/day in March and April. Humidity ranges from 74% to 86%, and wind speeds vary (0.95–2.53 m/s). The annual rainfall in 1984–2003 ranged from 1,617 to 2,712 mm per year, with an average annual rainfall of 1,947 mm. The climate type in the study area based on the Schmith-Ferguson classification system is type B (wet).

=== Chemical aspects ===
Chemical parameters in Lake Laut Tawar
Chemical parameter	Value
pH	8.22–8.41
Dissolved oxygen (ppm)	500–7.0
Biological oxygen demand (BOD, ppm)	0.62 – 1.11
Chemical oxygen demand (COD, ppm)	< 5
Nitrates (ppm)	0–0.13
Nitrides (ppm)	0.001–00003
Phosphates (ppm)	0.12–1.31
Potassium (ppm)	1.93–2.15

== Threats ==
The average CPUE decreased from 1.17 kg/m^{2} in the 1970s to 0.02 kg/m^{2} in 2009. There are four dominant factors behind the decrease of depik population: ecological disturbances and global warming, introduced species, unfriendly fishing practices, and pollution.

Although the temperature conditions of Lake Laut Tawar are still favorable for the growth of depik, the gradual increase in average temperature due to global warming will affect the life cycle of depik. In addition, the level of pollution continues to increase considering the area is rapidly developing and is one of the leading tourism sectors in the province of Aceh.

Predation and competition by introduced new species negatively impact depik. There are many depik environments that are used as the location for new species fish farming which can threaten the species. For example, Ikan Mas (Cyprinus carpio) is an invasive species that has been reported to have spread all over the lake's coast.

Fishing methods and practices also have a negative impact to depik. One of the fishing techniques commonly used by local fishermen is called the dedeseun trap, which capture migratory depik at the mouths of tributaries, many of them adult broodfish. Some fishermen use gillnets with small meshes (0.5 inches or the equivalent of 1.4 cm) that also catch smaller depik.

== Population and distribution ==
There is no accurate data regarding depik population based on recent research.

Depik have a distribution pattern that follows the water depth and distance from the coast. Higher catches were found in waters with a depth of ten meters compared to deeper waters (more than ten meters) and at a distance of 100 meters from shore. Depik were also caught in shallow water and near shore, though at relatively lower rates. Depik catch rate is higher in the rainy season than in the dry season.
