= Rembele Airport =

Rembele Airport Bandar Udara Rembele
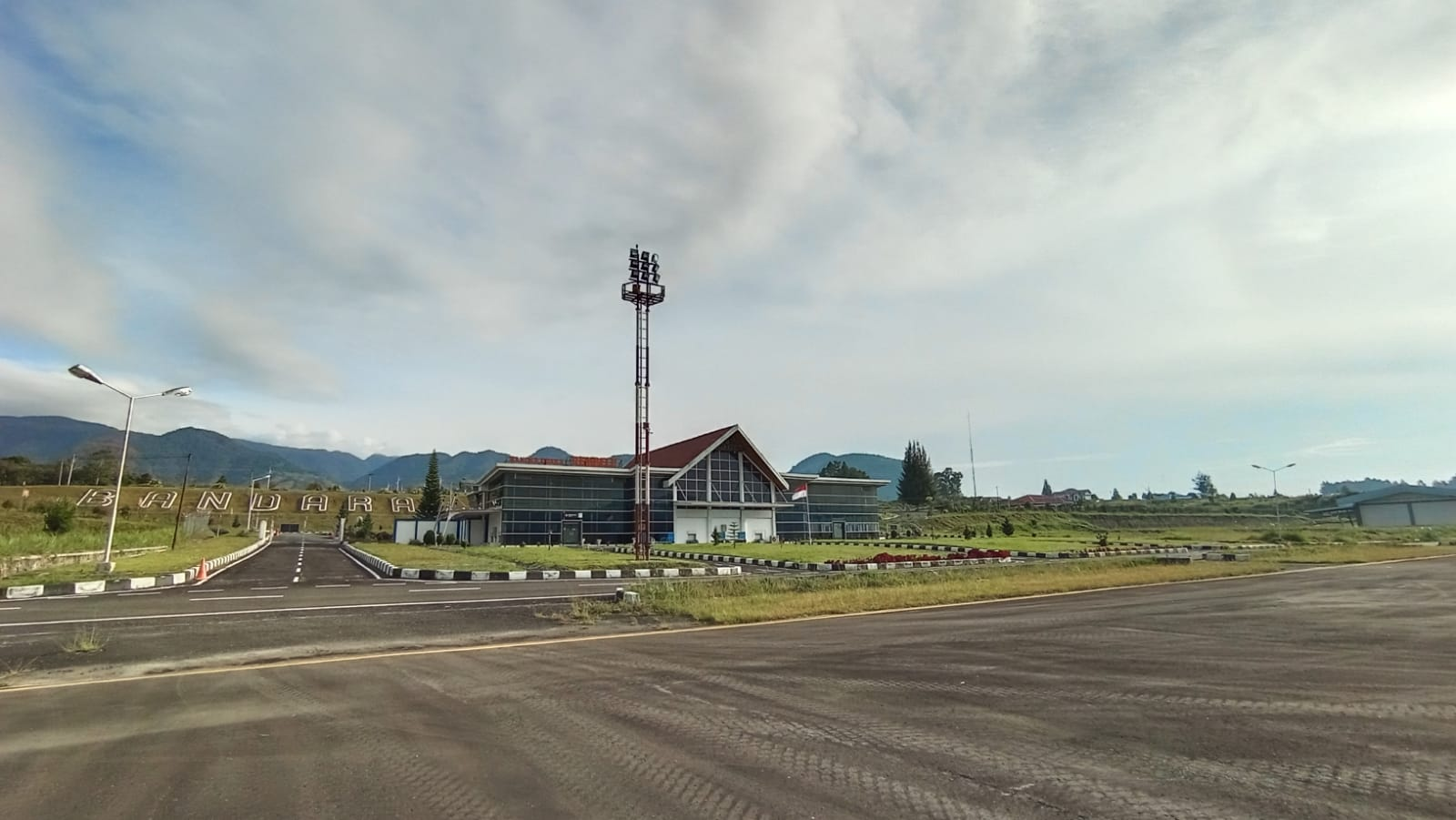
- IATA: TXE; ICAO: WITK

Summary
- Airport type: Public
- Owner: Government of Indonesia
- Operator: Ministry of Transportation
- Serves: Simpang Tiga Redelong and Takengon
- Location: Central Aceh Regency and Bener Meriah Regency, Aceh, Sumatra Island, Indonesia
- Time zone: WIB (UTC+07:00)
- Elevation AMSL: 1,418 m (4,652 ft)
- Coordinates: 04°43′15″N 096°50′58″E

Maps
- Sumatra region in Indonesia

- Location of airport in Sumatra

Runways
Direction	Length		Surface
Direction	m	ft	Surface
09/27	2,250	7,381	Asphalt
- Sources: DGCA

Rembele Airport (IATA: TXE, ICAO: WITK) is an airport serving the city of Takengon in the Central Aceh Regency, Aceh, Sumatra Island, Indonesia. The airport serves as one of the point of entry to the Gayo highland, a tourism destination known for its coffee and natural environment, including Lake Laut Tawar. To boost tourism growth in the region, the airport was renovated between 2014 and 2016, and the airport terminal's area of 400 m^{2} expanded to 1000 m^{2}.

The terminal can accommodate around 200,000 passengers annually. The appearance of the interior of the terminal was extensively remodeled. On the air side, the runway was extended from the original 1,400 m x 30 m to 2,250 m x 30 m so that it can accommodate narrow-body aircraft such as the Boeing 737 Next Generation and the C-130 Hercules. The apron was enlarged from the original 80 m x 106 m to 95 m x 150 m. The runway and taxiway were also paved. The airport's renovation was finished in 2016 and it was inaugurated by President Joko Widodo on 2 March 2016.

Former Minister of Transportation Ignasius Jonan stated that since Rembele Airport is located in a mountainous area, it would serve as a mitigation airport in the event of a disaster, particularly a tsunami, such as the one that devastated Aceh in 2004.

== Facilities ==
The airport resides at an elevation of 1,310 metres (4,298 ft) above mean sea level. It has one runway designated 09/27 with an asphalt surface measuring 2,250 m x 30 m (7,382 ft × 98.425 ft).

== Airlines and destinations ==
The following destinations are served from Takengon Rembele Airport:

Airlines	Destinations
Susi Air	Blangkejeren, Medan
Wings Air	Medan

== Gallery ==
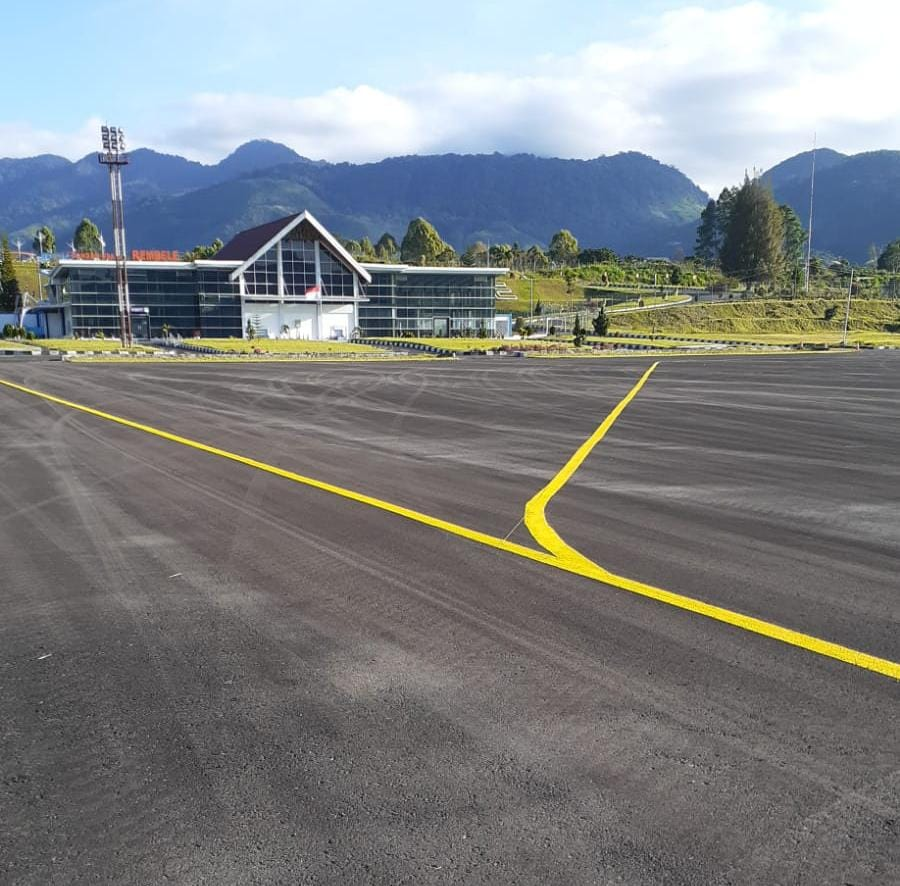
Apron view

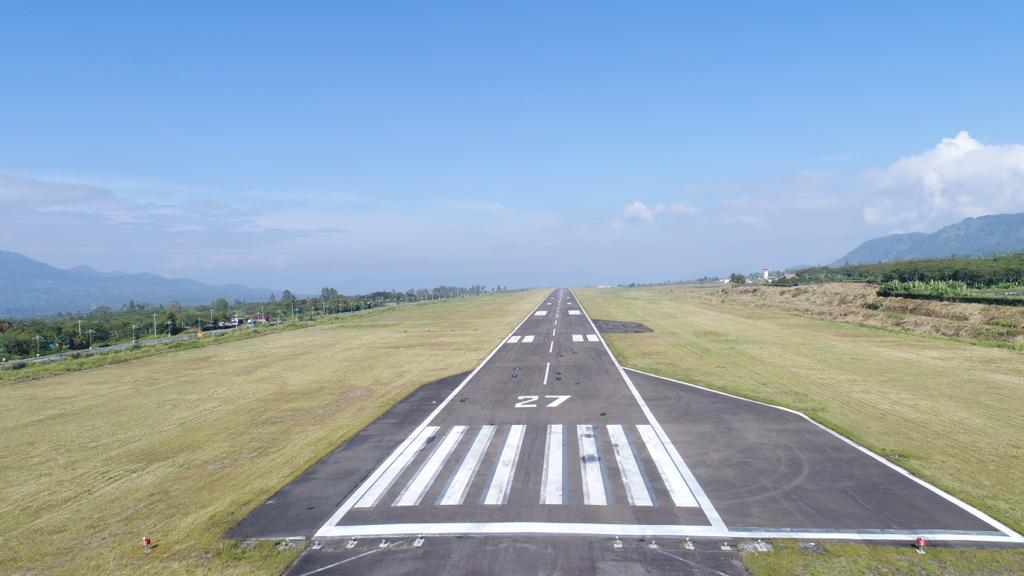
Runway

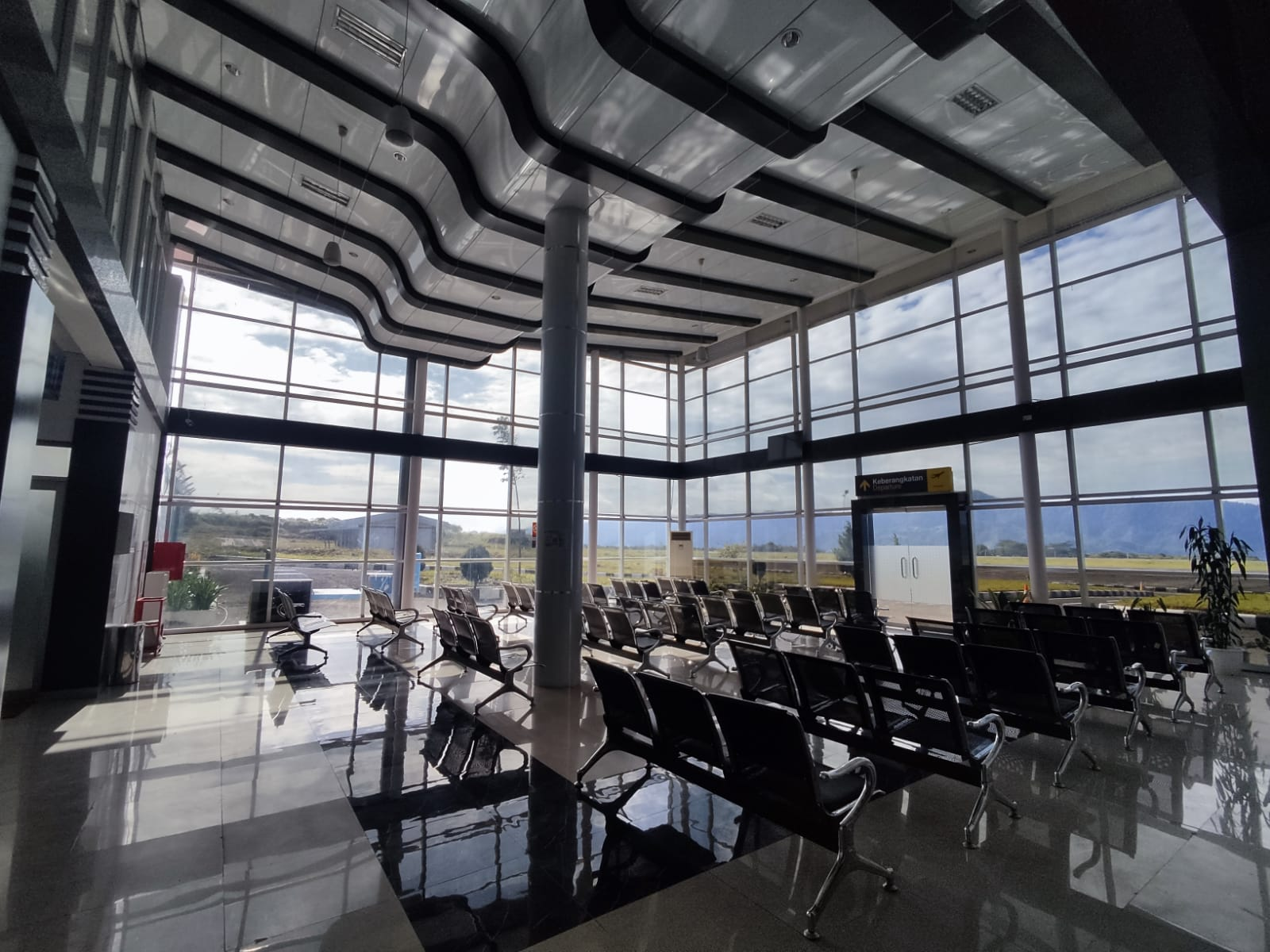
Waiting lounge
