= Gemboyah =

- Location in Aceh and Indonesia Gemboyah (Indonesia)
- Coordinates: 4°18′47.9″N 96°53′23.6″E
- Country: Indonesia
- Province: Aceh
- Regency: Central Aceh Regency
- District: Linge District
- Elevation: 7,350 ft (2,240 m)

Population (2010)
  - Total: 917
- Time zone: UTC+7 (Indonesia Western Standard Time)

Gemboyah is a village in Linge district, Central Aceh Regency in Aceh province, Indonesia. Its population is 917.

== Climate ==
Gemboyah has a subtropical highland climate (Cfb) with moderate to heavy rainfall year-round.

Climate data for Gemboyah
Month	Jan	Feb	Mar	Apr	May	Jun	Jul	Aug	Sep	Oct	Nov	Dec	Year
Mean daily maximum °C (°F)	20.1 (68.2)	21.0 (69.8)	20.9 (69.6)	20.6 (69.1)	20.6 (69.1)	20.1 (68.2)	19.6 (67.3)	19.7 (67.5)	19.3 (66.7)	19.2 (66.6)	19.2 (66.6)	20.0 (68.0)	20.0 (68.1)
Daily mean °C (°F)	15.4 (59.7)	15.6 (60.1)	15.7 (60.3)	15.7 (60.3)	15.5 (59.9)	15.0 (59.0)	14.6 (58.3)	14.6 (58.3)	14.7 (58.5)	14.9 (58.8)	15.0 (59.0)	15.4 (59.7)	15.2 (59.3)
Mean daily minimum °C (°F)	10.7 (51.3)	10.3 (50.5)	10.5 (50.9)	10.8 (51.4)	10.4 (50.7)	10.0 (50.0)	9.6 (49.3)	9.6 (49.3)	10.1 (50.2)	10.6 (51.1)	10.8 (51.4)	10.9 (51.6)	10.4 (50.6)
Average rainfall mm (inches)	172 (6.8)	128 (5.0)	215 (8.5)	212 (8.3)	162 (6.4)	77 (3.0)	76 (3.0)	103 (4.1)	168 (6.6)	231 (9.1)	238 (9.4)	218 (8.6)	2,000 (78.8)
Source: Climate-Data.org
