= Lake Laut Tawar =

Lake in Aceh, Indonesia

Laut Tawar
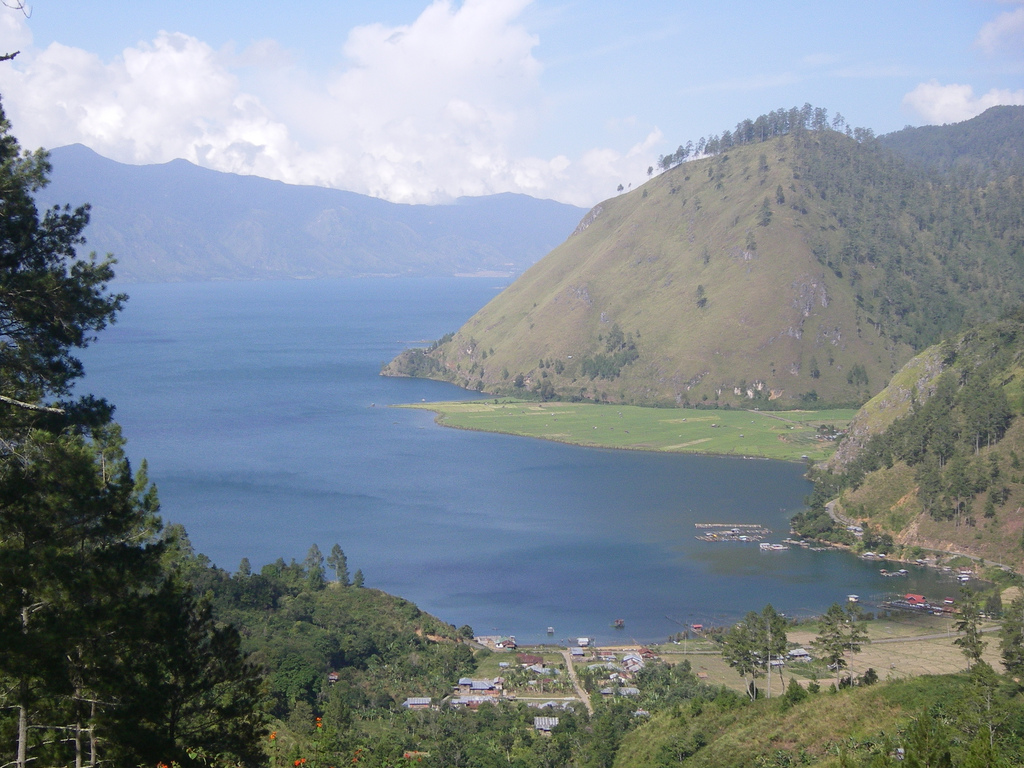
- Lake Laut Tawar

- Location within Aceh
- Location: Central Aceh Regency, Aceh, Indonesia
- Coordinates: 4°36′43″N 96°55′25″E
- Type: Tectonic
- Part of: Peusangan basin
- Primary outflows: Peusangan River
- Basin countries: Indonesia
- Surface area: 70 km^{2} (27 sq mi)
- Max. depth: 80 m (260 ft)
- Surface elevation: 1,100 m (3,600 ft)
- Danau Laut Tawar

Lake Laut Tawar (Indonesian: Danau Laut Tawar) is a lake in Central Aceh Regency of Aceh Province, Indonesia. It is located at 4°36′43″N 96°55′25″E. The name Laut Tawar literally means "freshwater sea". The Peusangan River serves as the outflow channel for the lake.

The lake is an important ecosystem to its endemic marine species, such as Rasbora tawarensis fish.

== Images ==
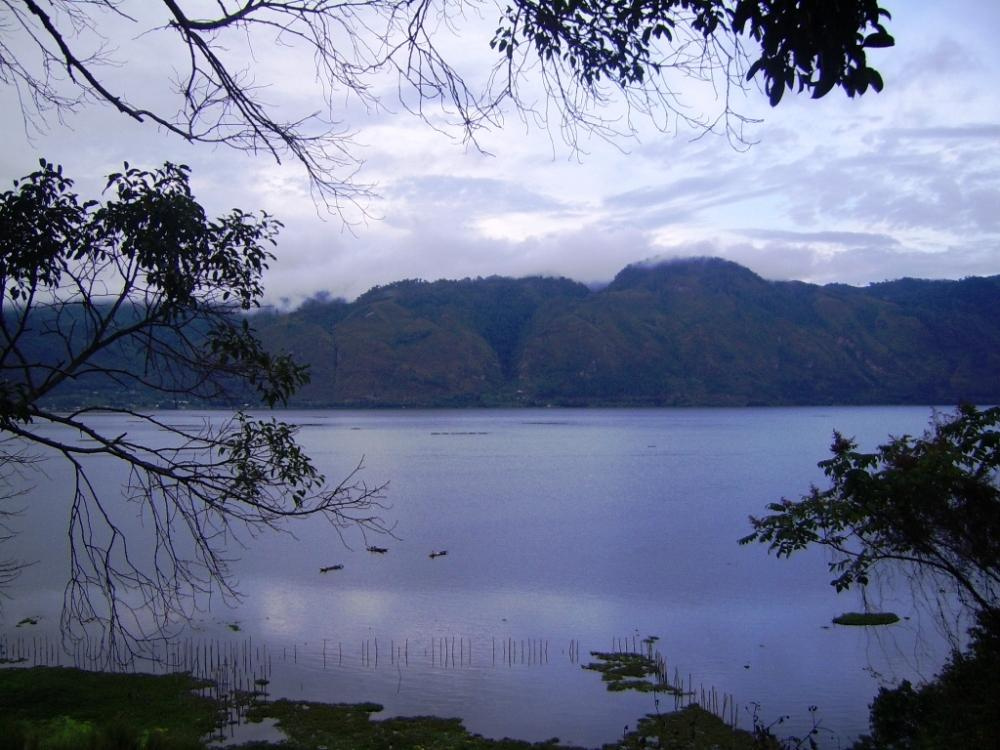
Laut Tawar Lake

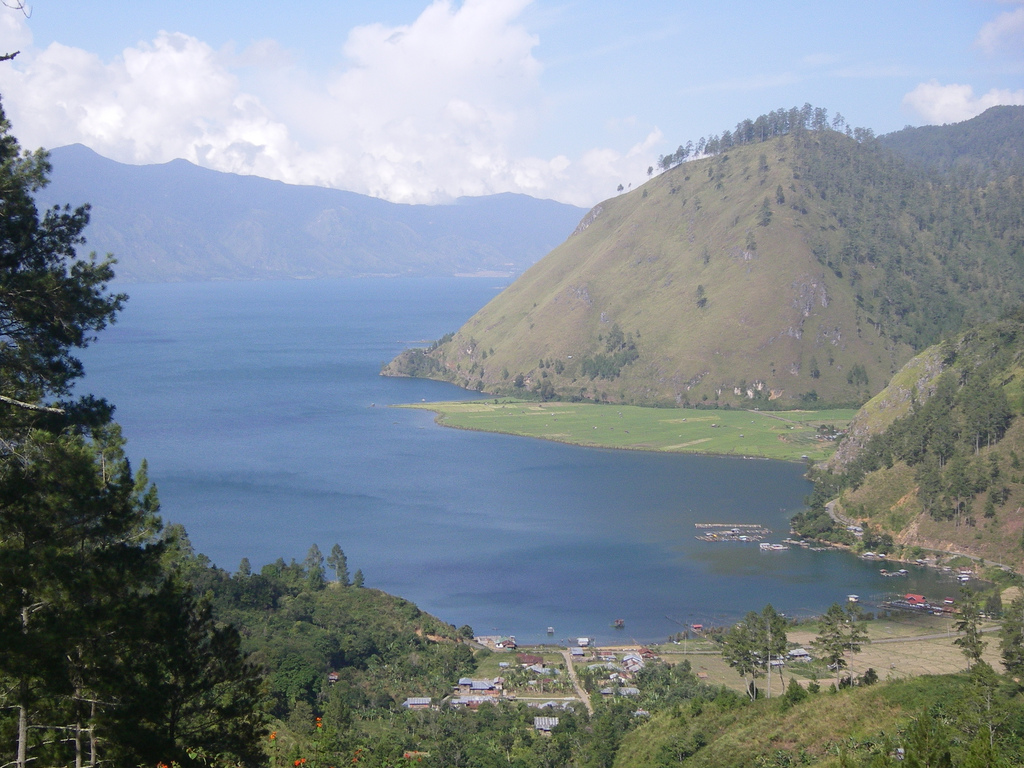
View of Lake Laut Tawar

== See also ==
- List of drainage basins of Indonesia
- List of lakes of Indonesia
- Rembele Airport
- Takengon
