= Blangkejeren =

Coordinates: 3.98333°N 97.3333°E

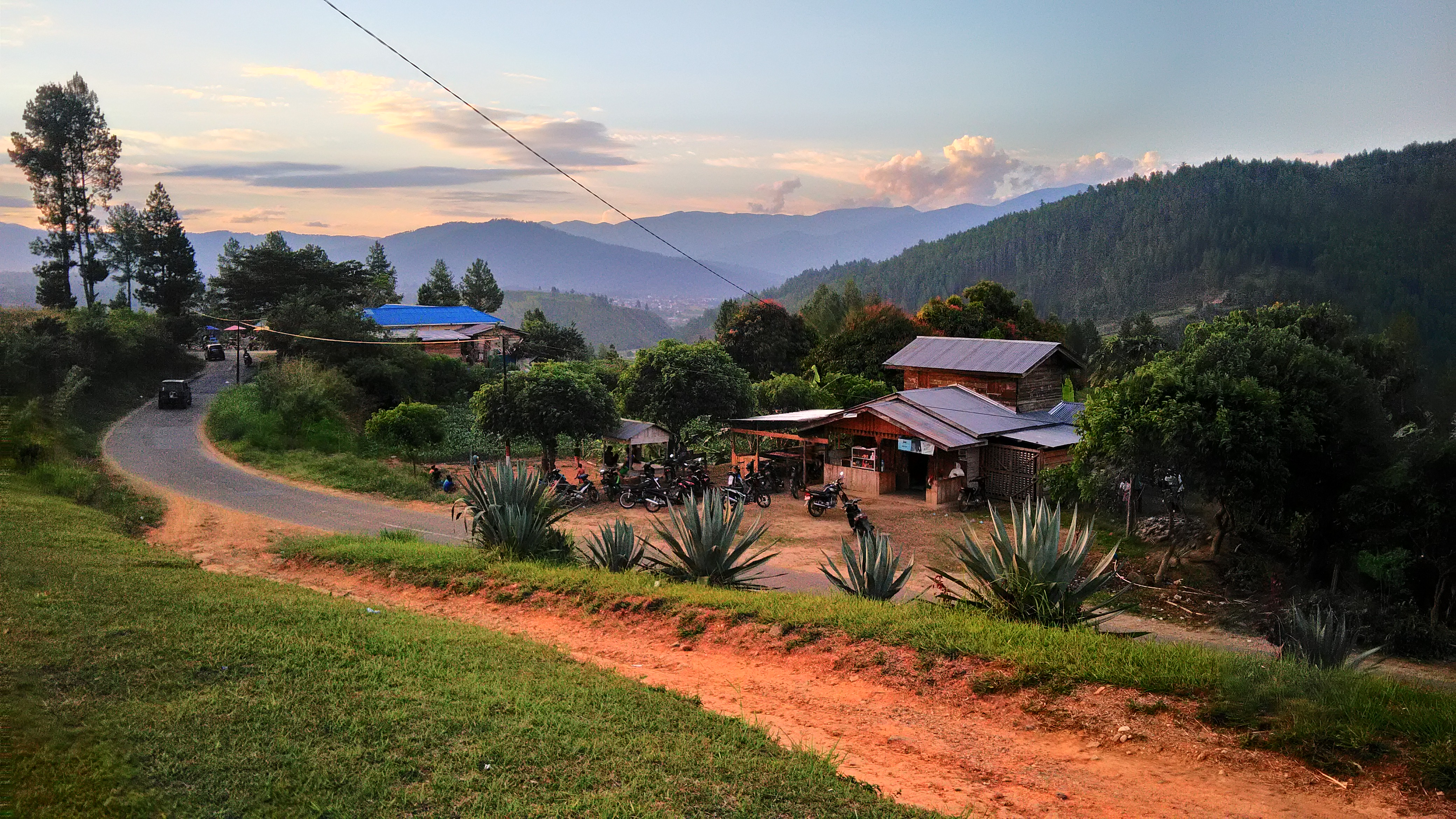
View from Bukit Cinta, Blangkejeren.

Blangkejeren is a small town and an administrative district (kecamatan) in Aceh Province of Indonesia. The town is the seat (capital) of Gayo Lues Regency. The district has an area of 166.06 km^{2} (64.12 sq mi) with a population of 32,597 people as of mid 2025, giving a population density of 196 per square kilometre (510/sq mi). The town (gampong), Kota Blaenkejeren, is located within the district, and covers an area of 0.42 km^{2} with a population of 2,856 as at mid 2024, although adjoining gampong such as Kuta Lintang (4,218 inhabitants) and Kampung Jawa (2,644 inhabitants) form part of a common built-up area.

Blangkejeren is located in the upper reaches of the Tripa River Basin, at an elevation of approximately 920 metres above sea level. It is a highland town nestled in the Bukit Barisan mountain range of Sumatra.

== Climate ==
Blangkejeren has a tropical rainforest climate (Af) with moderate to heavy rainfall year-round.

Climate data for Blangkejeren
Month	Jan	Feb	Mar	Apr	May	Jun	Jul	Aug	Sep	Oct	Nov	Dec	Year
Mean daily maximum °C (°F)	26.7 (80.1)	27.7 (81.9)	27.9 (82.2)	28.0 (82.4)	28.2 (82.8)	27.9 (82.2)	27.4 (81.3)	27.4 (81.3)	26.8 (80.2)	26.7 (80.1)	26.2 (79.2)	26.6 (79.9)	27.3 (81.1)
Daily mean °C (°F)	22.0 (71.6)	22.3 (72.1)	22.7 (72.9)	23.0 (73.4)	22.9 (73.2)	22.5 (72.5)	22.0 (71.6)	22.1 (71.8)	22.0 (71.6)	22.2 (72.0)	21.8 (71.2)	22.1 (71.8)	22.3 (72.1)
Mean daily minimum °C (°F)	17.4 (63.3)	17.0 (62.6)	17.5 (63.5)	18.0 (64.4)	17.7 (63.9)	17.2 (63.0)	16.7 (62.1)	16.8 (62.2)	17.3 (63.1)	17.7 (63.9)	17.5 (63.5)	17.6 (63.7)	17.4 (63.3)
Average rainfall mm (inches)	160 (6.3)	114 (4.5)	199 (7.8)	199 (7.8)	161 (6.3)	83 (3.3)	70 (2.8)	98 (3.9)	155 (6.1)	222 (8.7)	248 (9.8)	227 (8.9)	1,936 (76.2)
Source: Climate-Data.org
