= Takengon =

- Town

Other transcription(s)
  - Jawi: تقاڠاون
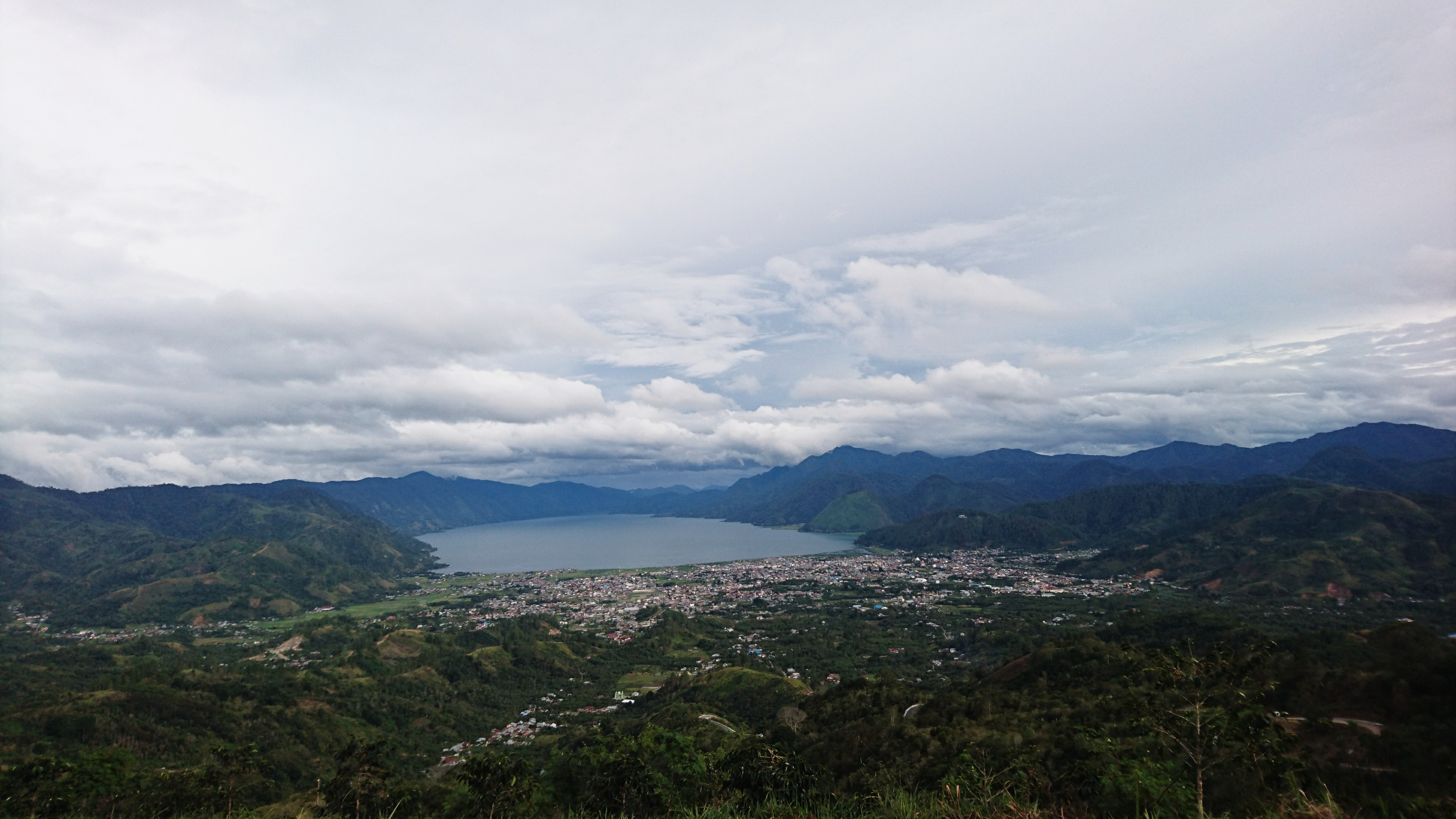
- View towards Takengon and Lake Laut Tawar

- Location within Indonesia
- Coordinates: 4°37′35″N 96°50′51″E
- Country: Indonesia
- Province: Aceh
- Regency: Central Aceh Regency
- Elevation: 1,258 m (4,127 ft)
- Time zone: UTC+7 (Western Indonesia Standard Time)

Takengon is a town in Aceh, Indonesia. The town itself sits on three administrative districts of the Central Aceh Regency—Bebesen, Kebayakan, and Lut Tawar, and acts as the seat of Central Aceh Regency. The town is in the highlands of western Sumatra, situated on the shores of Lake Laut Tawar. Surrounding it is a region that is well known for its coffee. Takengon is a plateau with cool air at an altitude of about 1200 metres above sea level.

Around Takengon there are many tourist attractions, including Lake Laut Tawar, Puteri Pukes Cave in Kebayakan sub-district, and Pantan Terong in Bebesen sub-district.

Takengon residents comprise various tribes and ethnicities, the majority of which is Gayo (Gayo: urang Gayô), its indigenous inhabitants. Additionally, there are Acehnese, Javanese, Batak, Minangkabau, Karo, Mandailing, and Chinese Indonesians.

== History ==
During the 11th century, a Gayo kingdom known as Linge existed near Takengon in Central Aceh. Following the Aceh War and the intrusion of Dutch colonialism, the region was established as an Onderafdeeling (Dutch term for sub-district) in 1904, with Takengon as its seat. Because of Takengon's location in the highlands, Dutch authorities assumed that it could sustain commercial plantations, and despite the poor road connections and infrastructure in the region, agricultural commodities became making inroads in Takengon. 1914 saw the opening of a road connecting Takengon to Bireuën, allowing the entry of commercial firms who opened pine and coffee plantations.

In September 1953, Takengon fell into Darul Islam hands. The town was occupied by Darul Islam forces for two months. TNI captured the town at the end of November 1953.

Following Indonesian independence, Takengon was organised as the administrative seat of Central Aceh Regency, which initially also included modern Gayo Lues and Bener Meriah until they were split out in 1974 and 2003, respectively.

== Transports ==
Takengon is served by the Rembele Airport (IATA: TXE, ICAO: WITK), which on March 3, 2016, has been improved to accommodate bigger airplanes with 30 by 2,250 metres square runway, 95 by 150 metres square apron, and 1,000 metres square terminal to serve up to 200,000 passengers per year. Currently Rembele Airport has about 4,000 passengers a year.

== Climate ==
Takengon has a tropical rainforest climate (Af) with moderate to heavy rainfall year-round.

Climate data for Takengon
Month	Jan	Feb	Mar	Apr	May	Jun	Jul	Aug	Sep	Oct	Nov	Dec	Year
Mean daily maximum °C (°F)	25.1 (77.2)	26.4 (79.5)	26.3 (79.3)	26.3 (79.3)	26.8 (80.2)	26.3 (79.3)	25.7 (78.3)	25.8 (78.4)	25.1 (77.2)	25.1 (77.2)	24.7 (76.5)	25.2 (77.4)	25.7 (78.3)
Daily mean °C (°F)	20.4 (68.7)	20.9 (69.6)	21.0 (69.8)	21.3 (70.3)	21.4 (70.5)	20.8 (69.4)	20.3 (68.5)	20.3 (68.5)	20.2 (68.4)	20.5 (68.9)	20.3 (68.5)	20.5 (68.9)	20.7 (69.2)
Mean daily minimum °C (°F)	15.8 (60.4)	15.4 (59.7)	15.8 (60.4)	16.4 (61.5)	16.0 (60.8)	15.4 (59.7)	14.9 (58.8)	14.9 (58.8)	15.4 (59.7)	15.9 (60.6)	15.9 (60.6)	15.9 (60.6)	15.6 (60.1)
Average rainfall mm (inches)	165 (6.5)	118 (4.6)	185 (7.3)	172 (6.8)	129 (5.1)	61 (2.4)	67 (2.6)	86 (3.4)	145 (5.7)	206 (8.1)	224 (8.8)	222 (8.7)	1,780 (70)
Source: Climate-Data.org

== Gallery ==
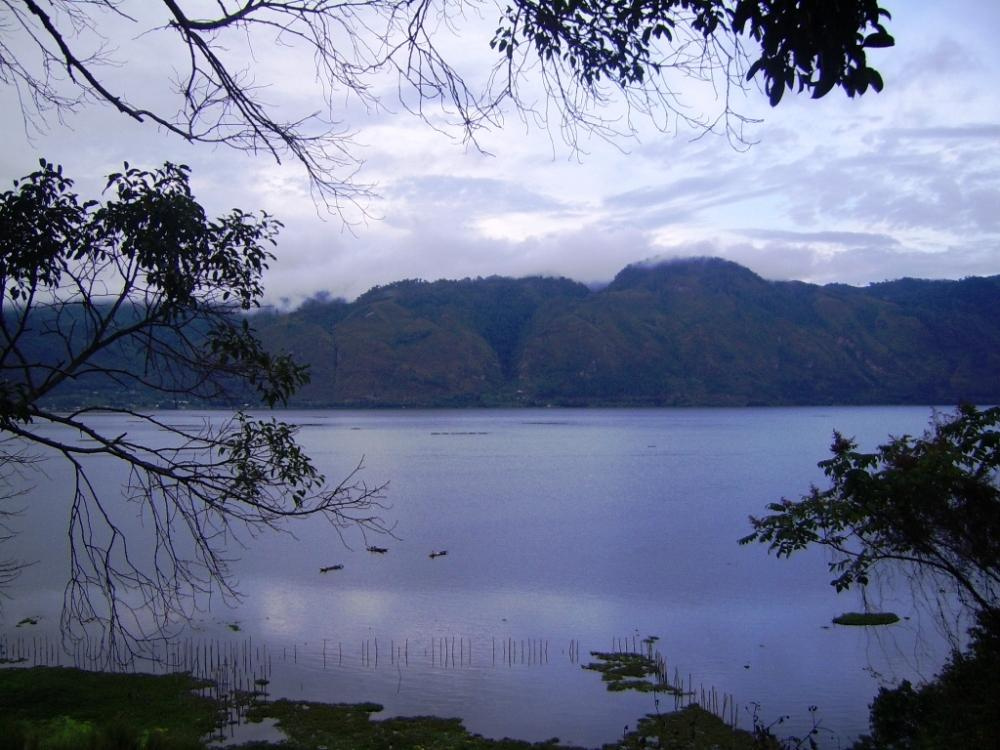
Laut Tawar Lake

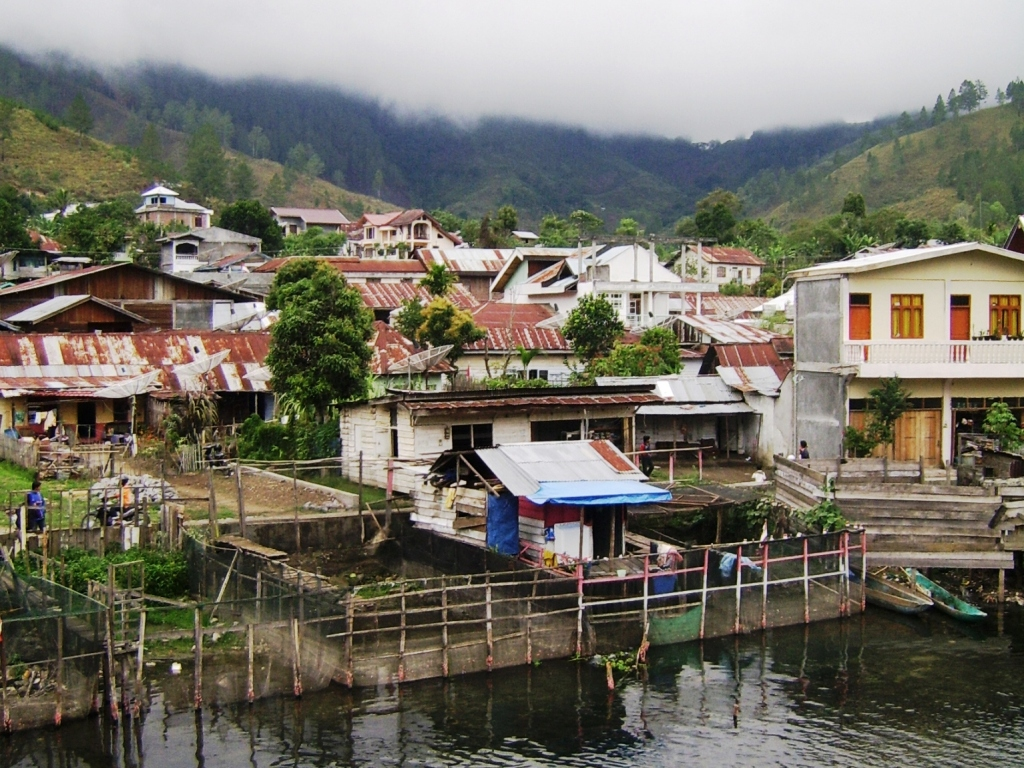
Takengon
