= Lingga Isaq Game Reserve =

- IUCN category VI (protected area with sustainable use of natural resources)
- Interactive map of Lingga Isaq Game Reserve
- Website: kphklinggaisaq.wixsite.com/kphklinggaisaq

The Lingga Isaq Game Reserve is found in Indonesia. It was established in 1978. This site is 800 km^{2}. It is located in Central Aceh, average 50 km from Takengon City.

A socio-economic study showed that 52.57% of the local community's income comes from coffee plantations planted in the reserve area.
