= Central Aceh Regency =

Regency in Aceh, Indonesia

Central Aceh Regency Kabupaten Aceh Tengah
- Regency
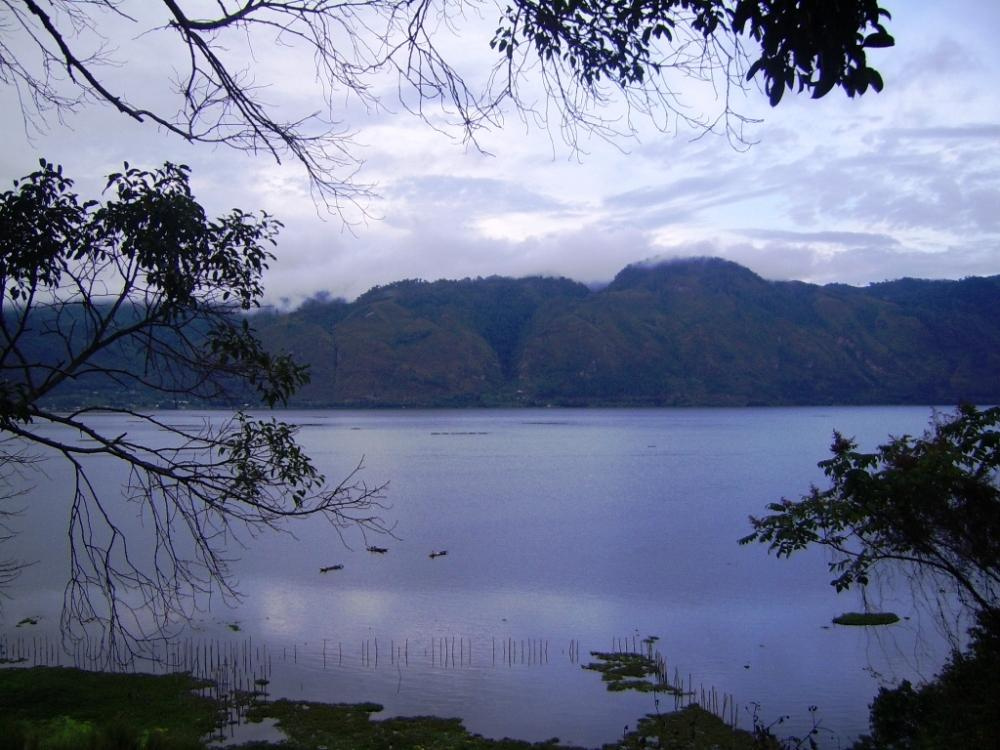
- Laut Tawar Lake

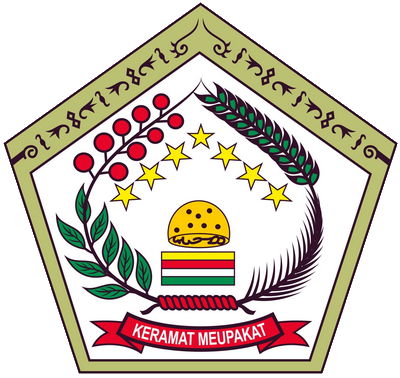
- Seal
- Motto: Keramat Meupakat (Honourable on consensus)
- Location within Aceh

- Location in Aceh, Northern Sumatra, Sumatra and Indonesia Central Aceh Regency (Northern Sumatra) Central Aceh Regency (Sumatra) Central Aceh Regency (Indonesia)
- Coordinates: 4°31′N 96°52′E
- Country: Indonesia
- Region: Sumatra
- Province: Aceh
- Established: 1956
- Regency seat: Takengon

Government
  - Regent: Haili Yoga
  - Vice Regent: Muchsin Hasan

Area
  - Total: 4,527.53 km^{2} (1,748.09 sq mi)

Population (mid 2025 estimate)
  - Total: 236,866
  - Density: 52.3168/km^{2} (135.500/sq mi)
- Time zone: UTC+7 (IWST)
- Area code: (+62) 643
- Website: acehtengahkab.go.id

Central Aceh Regency (Indonesian: Kabupaten Aceh Tengah) is a regency in Aceh province of Indonesia. It is located on Sumatra island. Formerly this regency covered a much larger area; on 4 June 1974, the Southeast Aceh Regency was separated from the Central Aceh Regency, and on 18 December 2003 the Bener Meriah Regency was separated from the remaining Central Aceh Regency.

The remaining regency covers an area of 4,527.53 square kilometres and had a population of 175,527 according to the 2010 census, which rose to 215,576 at the 2020 Census; the official estimate as of mid 2025 was 236,866 (comprising 119,551 males and 117,315 females). Most of its inhabitants are Gayo. Central Aceh is famous for its Lake Laut Tawar. Its capital is Takengon, in Lut Tawar District.

The residual regency is the main centre of coffee production within Aceh province and is home to the Gayo people who are mostly concentrated in this regency and in the neighbouring Bener Meriah Regency and Gayo Lues Regency.

== Geography ==
The regency borders Pidie Regency, Bireuen Regency and Bener Meriah Regency to the north, East Aceh Regency to the east, Gayo Lues Regency to the south and West Aceh, Pidie, and Nagan Raya regencies to the west.

Central Aceh District is a highland area with an altitude between 200 – 2600 metres above sea level and with an area of 4,527.53 km^{2}.

== Administrative districts ==
The regency is divided administratively into fourteen districts (kecamatan), tabulated below with their areas and their populations at the 2010 Census and the 2020 Census, together with the official estimates as of mid 2025. The table also includes the locations of the district administrative centres, the number of villages (gampong) in each district, and its post code(s).

Kode Wilayah	Name of District (kecamatan)	Area in km^{2}	Pop'n Census 2010	Pop'n Census 2020	Pop'n Estimate mid 2025	Admin centre	No. of villages	Post code
11.04.01	Linge	1,862.66	8,757	11,201	12,369	Isaq	26	24565
11.04.18	Atu Lintang	67.17	5,803	6,989	8,097	Merah Mege	11	24563
11.04.19	Jagong Jeget	171.24	8,871	10,352	11,368	Jeget Ayu	10	24564
11.04.08	Bintang	521.95	8,504	10,773	11,813	Bintang	24	24571
11.04.17	Lut Tawar	87.59	17,960	19,664	20,259	Takengon Timur	18	24511: 24516
11.04.11	Kebayakan	54.83	14,041	17,900	20,158	Kebayakan	20	24517: 24519
11.04.07	Pegasing	271.78	17,640	22,733	25,870	Simpang Kelaping	31	24560
11.04.20	Bies	14.01	6,414	8,162	9,131	Atang Jungket	12	24561
11.04.03	Bebesen	29.57	34,342	41,010	43,272	Kemili	28	24652
11.04.12	Kute Panang	35.15	6,815	8,400	9,279	Ratawali	24	24568
11.04.02	Silih Nara	91.48	20,542	24,581	26,987	Angkup	33	24569
11.04.10	Ketol	589.66	11,342	14,928	16,914	Rejewali	25	24566
11.04.13	Celala	136.21	8,367	10,297	11,380	Berawang Gading	17	24562
11.04.21	Rusip Antara	594.25	6,129	8,586	9,969	Pantan Tengah	16	24567
	Totals	4,527.53	175,527	215,576	236,866	Takengon	295	

== Politics ==
Its current regent is Drs. Shabela Abubakar, while his vice regent is H. Firdaus SKM. They have held the positions since 28 December 2017.

The Parliament Members are:

1. Ir. Syukur Kobath Golkar
2. Saib Nosarios PKP Indonesia
3. H. Zulpikar, AB, SE PNBK
4. Kasmawi, SH, SE Golkar
5. Drs. Samar Nawan Golkar
6. Sabirin Golkar
7. Mohd. Noh Golkar
8. Yahman Demokrat
9. Alamsyah Demokrat
10. Hamzah Abd. Gani Demokrat
11. Subahrin Demokrat
12. M. Alasyah Yakub Persatuan Pembangunan
13. Drs. Abdussalam Persatuan Pembangunan
14. Banta Mude, SP Persatuan Pembangunan
15. Drs. Yurmiza Putra Patriot Pancasila
16. Ir. Amiruddin Patriot pancasila
17. Adraka Ahfa PKP Indonesia
18. H.M. Yusbi Hakim Kebangsaan Demokrasi
19. H. Marsito, MR Kebangsaan Demokrasi
20. Wajadal Muna, SH Amanat Nasional
21. Nurdin Bintang Reformasi
22. Bardan Sahidi, S.Pdi Keadilan Sejahtera
23. Ir. Ampera Karya Peduli Bangsa
24. Drs. H. Mustafa Ali Bulan Bintang
25. Halidin Sarikat Indonesia

== Tourism ==
There are several tourist attractions, such as Danau Laut Tawar, Pantan Terong (scenery attraction), Gunung Burni Telong (hot spring), Taman Buru Linge Isak (hunting), Gua Loyang Koro, Lingga Isaq Game Reserve, Loyang Pukes, Loyang Datu, Burni Klieten (hiking), and Krueng Peusangan (rafting).

== Airport ==
Rembele Airport is the airport for the town of Takengon.
