= Bener Meriah Regency =

Regency in Aceh, Indonesia

Bener Meriah Regency Kabupaten Bener Meriah
- Regency
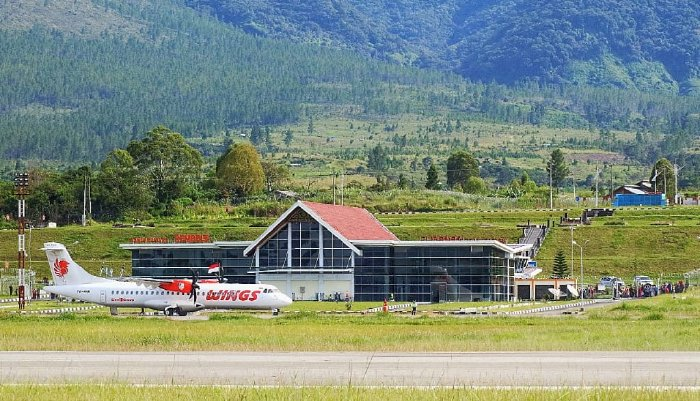
- Rembele Airport (near Takengon in the Central Aceh Regency)

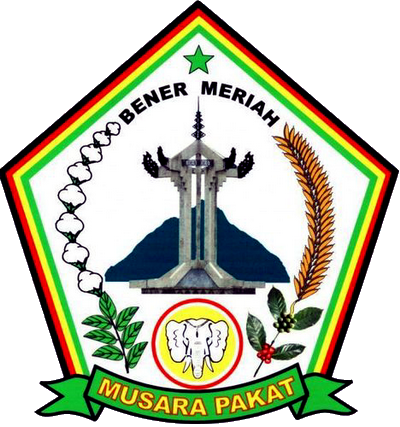
- Seal
- Motto: Musara Pakat ("Together reaching consensus")
- Location within Aceh

- Location in Aceh, Northern Sumatra, Sumatra and Indonesia Bener Meriah Regency (Northern Sumatra) Bener Meriah Regency (Sumatra) Bener Meriah Regency (Indonesia)
- Coordinates: 4°45′N 97°00′E
- Country: Indonesia
- Region: Sumatra
- Province: Aceh
- Established: 2003
- Regency seat: Simpang Tiga Redelong

Government
  - Regent: Tagore Abubakar
  - Vice Regent: Armia A.R.

Area
  - Total: 1,909.37 km^{2} (737.21 sq mi)

Population (mid 2025 estimate)
  - Total: 174,824
  - Density: 91.5611/km^{2} (237.142/sq mi)
- Time zone: UTC+7 (IWST)
- Area code: (+62) 643
- Website: benermeriahkab.go.id

Bener Meriah Regency (Indonesian: Kabupaten Bener Meriah) is a regency in Aceh Province of Indonesia. It is located on the island of Sumatra, and was formed on 18 December 2003 from districts previously part of Central Aceh Regency. The regency covers a land area of 1,909.37 square kilometres and it had a population of 122,277 at the 2010 census and 161,342 at the 2020 census; the official estimate as of mid 2025 was 174,824 (comprising 88,596 males and 86,228 females). Its capital is the town of Simpang Tiga Redelong. Until 2003 the present territory of this regency was the northern part of the Central Aceh Regency, from which it was split away.

== Administrative districts ==
As of the 2010 census, the regency was divided administratively into seven districts (kecamatan). However, since 2010 three additional districts - Bener Kelipah, Gajah Putih and Mesidah - have been created by the division of existing districts. The ten districts are listed below with their areas and their populations at the 2010 census and the 2020 census, together with the official estimates as of mid 2025. The table also includes the locations of the district administrative centres, the number of villages (gampong) in each district, and its post code.

Kode Wilayah	Name of District (kecamatan)	Area in km^{2}	Pop'n census 2010	Pop'n census 2020	Pop'n estimate mid 2025	Admin centre	No. of villages	Post code
11.17.07	Timang Gajah	80.93	25,315	21,880	22,898	Lampahan	30	24555
11.17.10	Gajah Putih	68.34	^{(a)}	9,326	9,767	Reronga	10	24553
11.17.01	Pintu Rime Gayo	249.28	10,155	14,752	16,719	Blang Rakal	23	24554
11.17.05	Bukit	139.97	21,781	29,489	32,299	Simpang Tiga Redelong	40	24581
11.17.06	Wih Pesam	60.47	19,861	24,938	26,337	Pante Raya	27	24580
11.17.04	Bandar	55.61	25,931	28,261	30,148	Pondok Baru	35	24582
11.17.08	Bener Kelipah	23.11	^{(a)}	4,984	5,319	Gunung Musara	12	24583
11.17.03	Syiah Utama	716.72	4,525	2,147	2,591	Samar Kilang	14	24586
11.17.09	Mesidah	320.24	^{(a)}	5,199	6,195	Wer Tingkem	15	24584
11.17.02	Permata	194.70	14,709	20,366	22,551	Buntul	27	24585
	Totals	1,909.37	122,277	161,342	174,824	Simpang Tiga Redelong	233	

Note: (a) the 2010 population of these three districts is included in the figure for the preceding districts, from which they were subsequently split away.

Bener Meriah Regency covers the former northern part of the Central Aceh Regency, and is bordered by Bireuen, North Aceh and Central Aceh regencies.
