= Gayo Lues Regency =

Regency in Aceh, Indonesia

Gayo Lues Regency Kabupaten Gayo Lues
- Regency
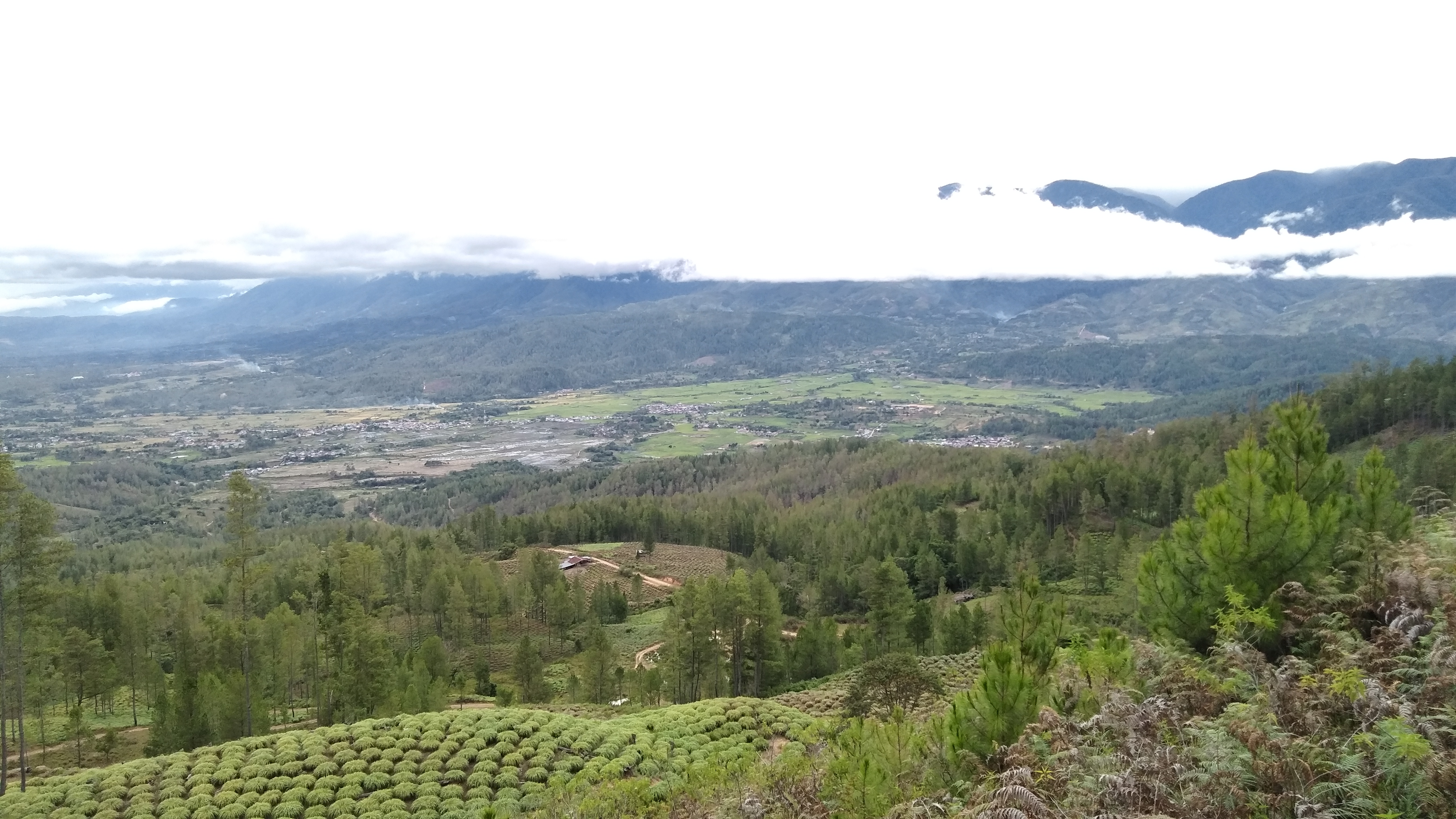
- Aerial view of the town of Blajerango

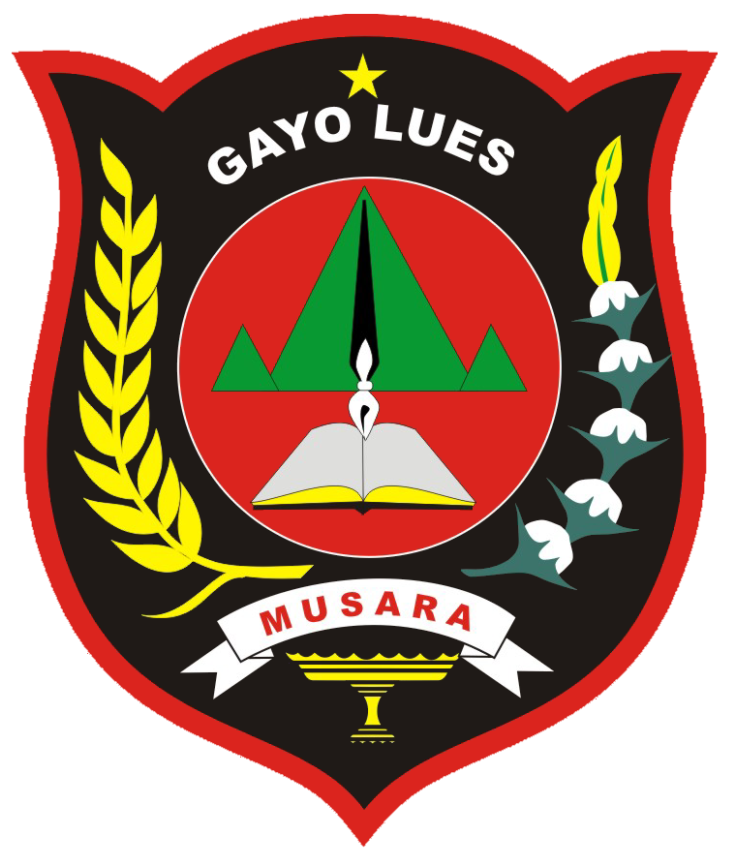
- Coat of arms
- Motto: Musara ('United')
- Location within Aceh

- Location in Aceh, Northern Sumatra, Sumatra and Indonesia Gayo Lues Regency (Northern Sumatra) Gayo Lues Regency (Sumatra) Gayo Lues Regency (Indonesia)
- Coordinates: 4°N 97°E
- Country: Indonesia
- Region: Sumatra
- Province: Aceh
- Established: 2002
- Regency seat: Blangkejeren

Government
  - Regent: Suhaidi
  - Vice Regent: Maliki

Area
  - Total: 5,549.91 km^{2} (2,142.83 sq mi)

Population (mid 2025 estimate)
  - Total: 108,429
  - Density: 19.5371/km^{2} (50.6008/sq mi)
- Time zone: UTC+7 (IWST)
- Area code: (+62) 629
- Website: gayolueskab.go.id

Gayo Lues Regency (Indonesian: Kabupaten Gayo Lues) is a regency in the Aceh Province of Indonesia. It is located on the island of Sumatra. The regency was created on 10 April 2002 under Statute UU 4/2002 from the northern part of Aceh Tenggara (Southeast Aceh Regency). Its capital is Blangkejeren. The regency covers an area of 5,549.91 square kilometres and had a population of 79,560 at the 2010 Census and 99,532 at the 2020 Census; the official estimate as of mid 2025 was 108,429 (comprising 54,595 males and 53,834 females). Along with the Central Aceh Regency and the Bener Meriah Regency, it is home to the Gayo people.

== Economy ==
Ninety percent of the inhabitants make their living from farming and other food production. Products include:

- chili peppers
- Padang cassia cinnamon
- clove
- ginger
- kencur galangal
- lemongrass
- turmeric
- vanilla
- candlenut
- chocolate
- coconut
- coffee
- fish
- rice
- sago
- palm sugar
- pecan
- sugarcane
- kapok fibre
- patchouli
- citronella oil
- areca nut
- tobacco

Logging is reportedly a major problem in the regency which is the least populated area of the province with less than 2% of the total population.

== Administrative districts ==
The regency is divided administratively into eleven districts (kecamatan), listed below with their areas and their populations at the 2010 Census and the 2020 Census, together with the official estimates as at mid 2025. The table also includes the locations of the district administrative centres, the number of villages (gampong) in each district, and its post code.

Kode Wilayah	Name of District (kecamatan)	Area in km^{2}	Pop'n 2010 Census	Pop'n 2020 Census	Pop'n mid 2025 Estimate	Admin centre	No. of villages	Post code
11.13.02	Kuta Panjang	269.53	7,330	9,365	10,375	Kuta Panjang	12	24650
11.13.09	Blang Jerango	382.42	6,379	7,355	8,124	Buntul Gemuyang	10	24655
11.13.01	Blangkejeren	166.06	24,434	31,180	32,597	Blangkejeren	22	24655
11.13.07	Putri Betung	996.85	6,607	9,142	10,137	Gumpang	13	24658
11.13.08	Dabun Gelang	444.71	5,277	6,773	7,525	Badak Bur Jumpe	11	24652
11.13.06	Blang Pegayon	272.18	5,099	6,406	7,696	Cinta Maju	12	24653
11.13.05	Pining	1,350.09	4,320	5,112	5,356	Pining	9	23659
11.13.03	Rikit Gaib	264.08	3,770	4,525	5,178	Buntul Gemuya	13	24651
11.13.11	Pantan Cuaca	295.06	3,481	4,338	5,034	Kenyaran	11	24654
11.13.04	Terangun	671.80	7,953	9,551	10,151	Terangun	25	24656
11.13.10	Tripe Jaya	437.13	4,910	5,785	6,256	Rerebe	10	24657
	Totals	5,549.91	79,560	99,532	108,429	Blangkejeren	159	

== See also ==
- List of regencies and cities of Indonesia
