= Peurise Teumaga =

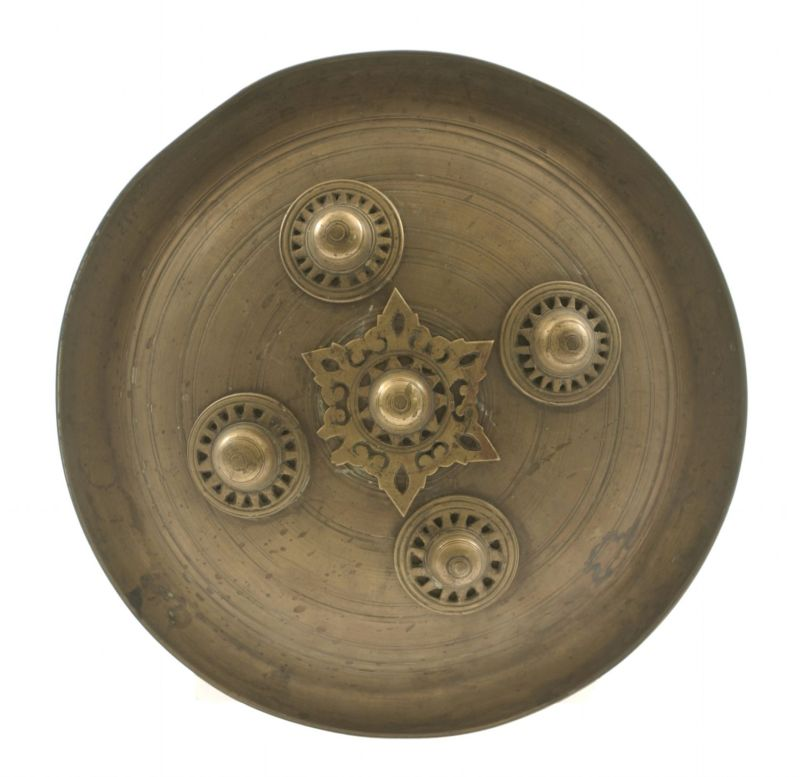
- A Peurise Teumaga, pre-1917.
- Type: Shield
- Place of origin: Indonesia (Aceh)

Service history
- Used by: Alas people, Acehnese people, Gayo people
- Wars: Aceh War (1873–1914)

Specifications
- Diameter: 24–35 cm (9.4–13.8 in)

Peurise Teumaga or Peurise Lembaga is a shield originating from Aceh, Indonesia. This shield is very similar to the Peurise Awe, except that it is made of brass instead of rattan. The shield was also used by Acehnese warriors during the Aceh War against the Dutch colonials in the 19th century.

== Description ==
The Peurise Teumaga is made of cast brass or bronze. The decoration often consists of concentric circles made on a lathe using a chisel. Common decorations of six hexagonal stars can also be found on this shield. A rope is attached behind the shield to function as the handle. The diameter of this shield is approximately 24 to 35 cm (9.4 to 13.8 in).

== See also ==
- Baluse
- Salawaku
