= Indonesia Women's Ulema Congress =

Indonesia Women's Ulema Congress (Indonesian: Kongres Ulama Perempuan Indonesia) or KUPI were two congress events held in Indonesia for gathering of women Islamic scholars across the country. The congress was first held in April 2017, resulted in Kebon Jambu Pledge (Indonesian: Ikrar Kebon Jambu), a document regarding status of women as ulema. The second congress were held in November 2022 resulted in another document, Bangsi Jepara Pledge (Indonesian: Ikrar Bangsi Jepara) that outlined the needs for women Islamic scholars to take parts in empowering women, fighting against violence justified using religion, among other issues such as child marriage, female genital mutilation, and sexual violence. The congress and movements around it were seen as progressive alternative to what is seen as patriarchy-dominated field with most of Islamic scholars and experts were often men. The two congresses gained positive respond both domestically and internationally.

Traditionally, including in Indonesia, field of study around Islam was dominated by male scholars, with Nahdlatul Ulama, largest Muslim organization in the country only appointed its first women in top position on 2022, the first during its 100 years history. However, historically, there exist prominent women Islamic scholars such as Rahmah el Yunusiyah from West Sumatra, Nya'i Khairiyah from East Java, and Teungku Fakinah from Aceh. Prior to KUPI being held, there was no concentrated or organized effort by women Islamic scholars and as the result most worked individually before. Therefore, there was also considerably lack of women and gender-friendly interpretation and perspectives.
