= Upuh Ulen-Ulen =

Upuh Ulen-Ulen, also known as kerawang gayo, is a traditional cloth of the Gayonese people in Aceh, Indonesia.

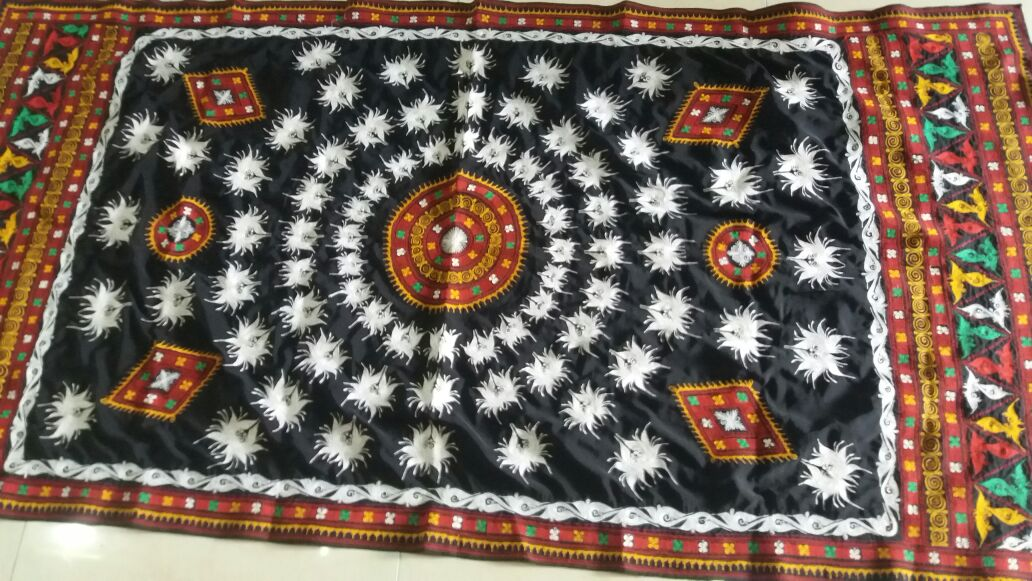
Upuh Ulen-Ulen from the collection of the Indonesian poet Deknong Kemalawati

The cloth is traditionally placed on a young couple during a wedding ceremony, as well as on the shoulders of guests of honour. On April 6, 2018, the Aceh poet Lesik Kati Ara presented Joko Widodo, the president of Indonesia, with a cloth in the State Palace in Jakarta.

The cloth has many components. Traditionally, the background is meant to be the same as 'the contrast and color of the Earth'. According to a Gayonese proverb, God created man from the earth, who then lives on the earth and ultimately returns to the earth after death. The white circle in the center symbolizes a full moon.

Other motifs found in Upuh Ulen-Ulen are:

1. A fence (jang), since everything in the world has a certain limit, beyond which one should not go.
2. Sprouts of bamboo (tuwis), which are symbols of persistence, longevity, and happiness.
3. A string of clouds (enum beriring), which is an allegory of our path through life.
