= Peurise Awe =

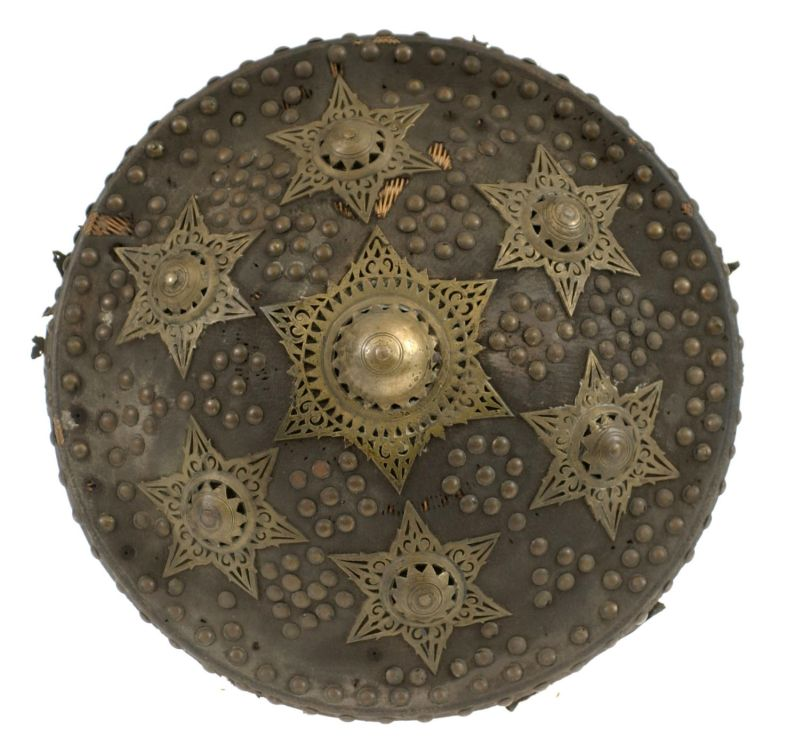
- A Peurise Awe, circa 1875.
- Type: Shield
- Place of origin: Aceh, Indonesia

Service history
- Used by: Alas people, Acehnese people, Gayo people
- Wars: Aceh War (1873–1914)

Specifications
- Diameter: 35–45 cm (14–18 in)

Peurise Awe or Peurise Awi is a shield originating from Aceh, Indonesia. The shield was used by Acehnese warriors during the Aceh War against the Dutch colonials in the 19th century.

== Description ==
The Peurise Awe is a peurise (shield) of plaited rattan strips (glong). It may be covered with red or black cotton. The diameter of this shield is approximately 35 to 45 cm (14 to 18 in). The outer part of the shield is strengthened with brass rivets, and inside there is a rope that is used as a handle. The outer part of the shield is decorated with six circular inserts (bushings) that are made of brass, and one brass star in the middle. The brass decorations are usually in the shape of a hexagram, similar to the Star of David. These hexagonal stars represent 'stars of security'.
