= George Frederik Willem Borel =

Dutch General (1837–1907)

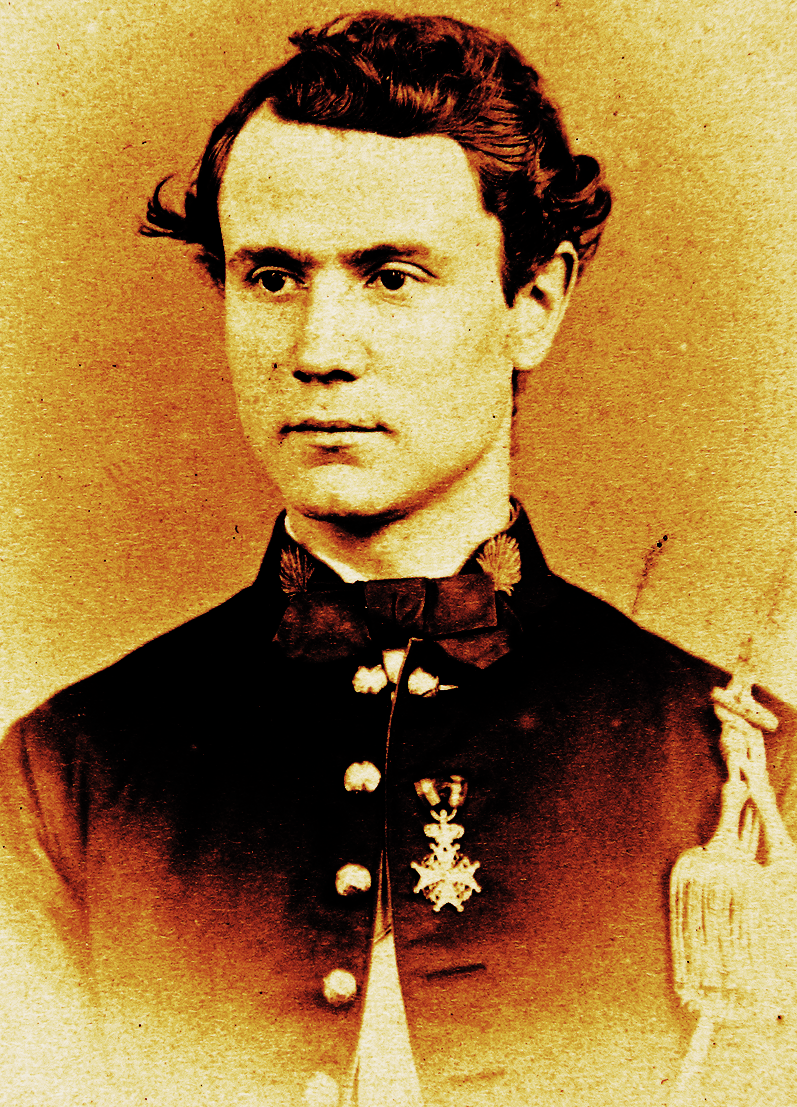
- Borel as first lieutenant at the time of the expedition to Bandjarmasin
- Born: August 22, 1837; Maastricht, United Kingdom of the Netherlands
- Died: August 4, 1907 (aged 69); Bad Nauheim, German Empire
- Burial place: Bad Bauheim
- Military career
- Allegiance: Netherlands
- Branch: Royal Netherlands East Indies Army
- Service years: 41
- Rank: Major General
- Unit: Artillery
- Conflicts: Aceh War; Banjarmasin War; Second Aceh Expedition
- Awards: Military William Order, Honorary Sabre, Order of Orange-Nassau
- Other work: Published two books about the Aceh War

Signature
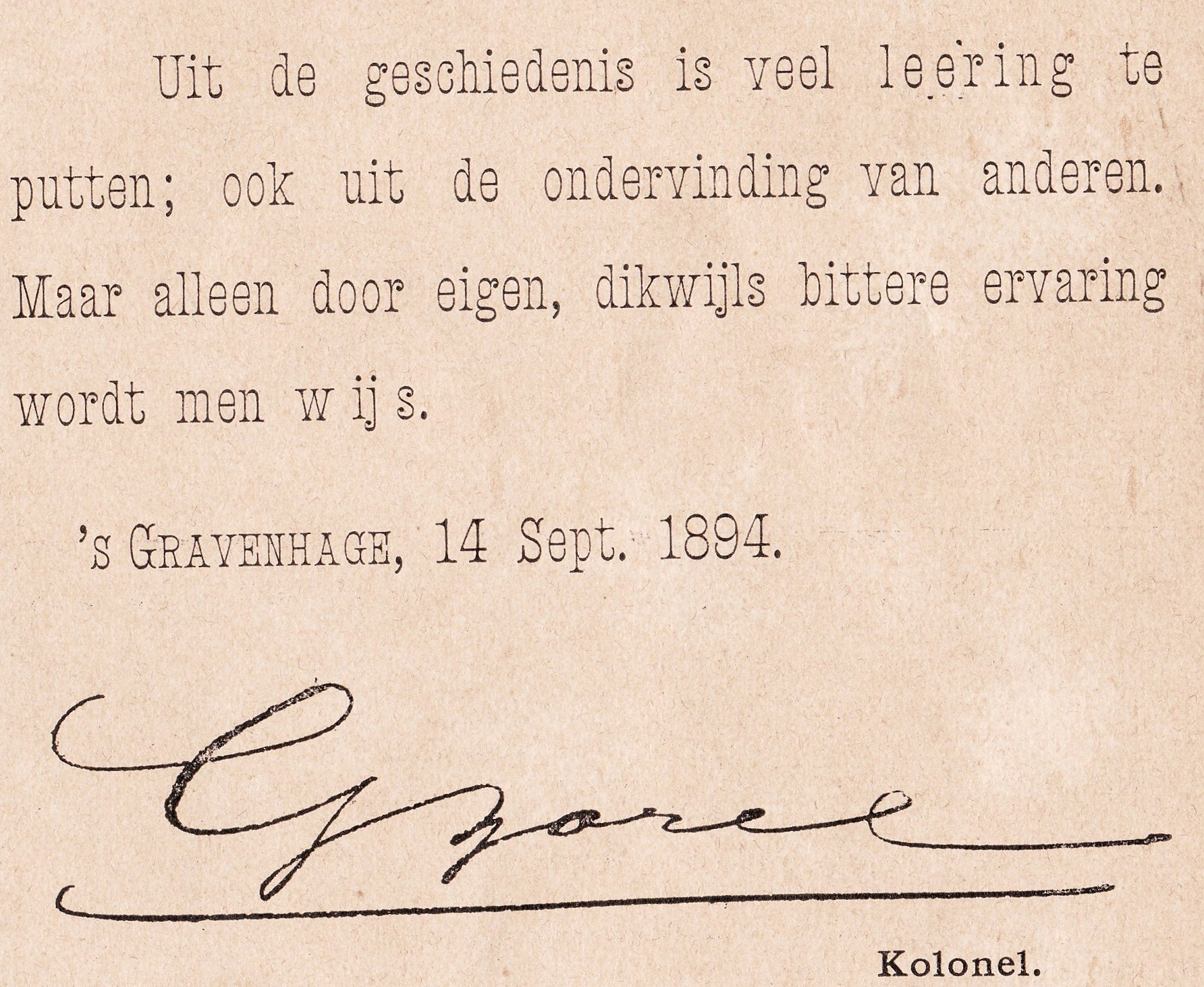

George Frederik Willem Borel (22 August 1837 – 4 August 1907) was a major general in the Netherlands, notable for his involvement in the Banjarmasin and Aceh Wars.

== Career ==
Borel began his career in 1852 as a cadet in the artillery for the Dutch army at the Royal Military Academy in Breda, and by the Royal Decree of 14 July 1857 he was appointed as second lieutenant in the second regiment of fortress artillery. On September 22, 1857, he served in the artillery of the Indian army. He left on 13 November from the Colonial Wharf Depot to Harderwijk with a detachment replacement troops.

== Expedition to Banjarmasin ==
The Royal Decree of 17 August 1859 promoted Borel to first lieutenant and commander of the expeditionary artillery. In the same year he began an expedition to the South and East Division of Borneo. After repeated defeats by the enemy, the war moved gradually to the north of the sultan's empire. By a slight gain of 4 officers, 162 man infantry and 20 artillerymen who arrived on September 28 from Surabaya, as commander it was now possible to apprehend insurgents in more remote areas. So when it became known that Antaloedin, leader of affairs north of the Allalak River, was going to Mata Raman in secrecy, a strongly armed Dutch garrison, composed of hundreds of bayonets, a howitzer and a hand mortar under the command of Captain Van Oijen prepared to engage Antaloedin. After a march of seven hours and many other complications, Van Oijen rushed into the battle the next day and took many casualties. In desperation, Borel and Lieutenant Perelaer threw themselves into the river, swam to the other side and shocked the enemy into withdrawing. The Dutch victory was crucial in the war effort and had breached many of Antaloedin's defensive positions. An uneasy peace was acquired, but the peace did not last as Demang Lehman tried to assassinate Colonel Andresen. Borel took part in the expedition until December 1860 and distinguished himself mainly during the conquest of Tjinta Puri on 21 October 1859. The target was surrounded by an almost impenetrable swamp, and an impassable river. Many soldiers were distinguished in this victory and Borel, by Royal Decree of February 18, 1861, was appointed knight of the Military Order of William. On Borels request he was allowed (October 1862) to return to the Netherlands. He departed on December 24 on the steamship Batavia. In The Netherlands he was assigned to the third regiment of fortress-artillery (15 September 1863). He was promoted to captain third class (by age of rank).

== Second expedition to Aceh ==
After the failed first expedition to Aceh, the government asked Borel to join the second expedition to Aceh, and thus for two years he joined the Indian army in Aceh. He was entrusted the leadership of the new siege. Borel arrived in Batavia on September 20, 1873, by steamship Prince of Orange (departed on 6 August) under his commands was a detachment of 18 NCOs, 288 troops and was assigned the leadership of the newly drawn exercises for the siege.

== Colonel Borel as governor of the Royal Military Academy ==
Borel returned to the Netherlands on June 11, 1875, and was placed at the second fortress-artillery regiment. He spoke in the meeting of the Royal Society for the Practice of Military Science on Wednesday, February 5, 1879, on the Indian brigade, its composition, armament and destination, and ended this speech with the words: Gentlemen, I end my speech with a sincere desire that the Indian brigade, as they have ever created could come, not only may serve to increase our resilience, but also to guarantee the more to the lasting and peaceful possession of our beautiful colonies, which Dutch growth and prosperity are so closely connected . The primary purpose of Borel in the deployment of that brigade was soon to make an end to the then rampant four years long Aceh War.

== Paper War ==
Two years after his return to the Netherlands Borel wrote a highly critical book about the politics held during the second Aceh expedition. Supreme Commander of the second expedition, General van Swieten, wrote his book, "The Truth about our branch in Aceh" following Borels book. Borel defended himself against accusations raised against him by Van Swieten, in his epilogue "Fallacies are not the truth" (1880). The flow of documents back and forth that followed the Second Aceh war, was called "the Paper War." Borel's son, writer Henri Borel, wrote a critical work in 1878, "Our Office in Aceh," where he harshly condemned the policies and tactics of General van Swieten which at that time caused a sensation in large military and colonial circles. It was an unprecedented act of courage at that time, a captain who was honestly not afraid to criticize his commanding general.
