= Payung mesikhat =

Traditional ritual umbrella of the Alas people

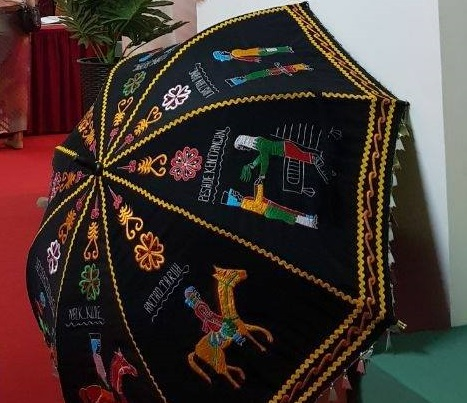
Payung masikhat - a traditional ritual umbrella among the Alas people in Aceh (Indonesia) (from the collection of Indonesia poet Deknong Kemalawati

Payung mesikhat is the traditional ritual umbrella of the Alas people in the province of Aceh, Indonesia. It is used for various ceremonies such as circumcisions, weddings, and meeting guests of honor. It is made from black waterproof fabric with embroidery that reflects the purpose of the umbrella. For example, a wedding umbrella depicts several scenes from the life of a girl during her girlhood, including scenes of the domestic works such as rice pounding and others. In addition, Islamic embroidered designs are on the edge of the umbrella, and around it, many strips of silver are hung.

The ritual umbrellas are kept in families and inherited from generation to generation. Before the Dutch colonial era, only members belonging to the Alas clan of Pagan had the privilege of passing in front of Alas local lords' houses on horseback with a ritual umbrella up, while members belonging to other clans had to close their umbrellas and dismount.

The Museum Five Continents in Munich, Germany, holds an Alas ritual umbrella, which is occasionally exhibited.
