= Alas people =

Ethnic group from Aceh, Indonesia

Ukhang Alas
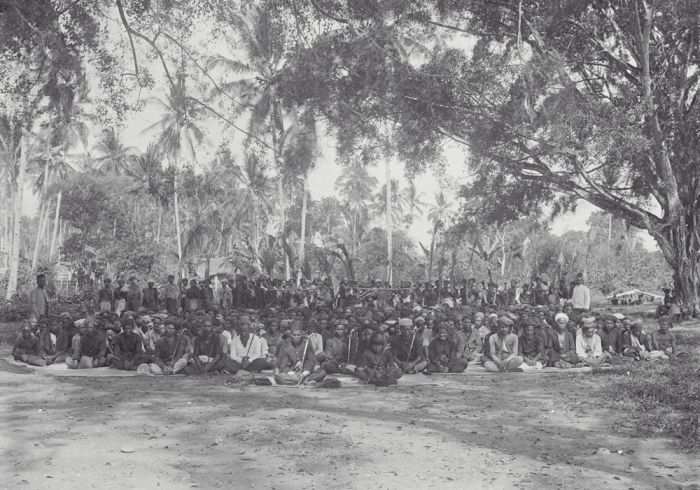
- The Alas people on 29 June 1904 in front of Gotfried Coenraad Ernst van Daalen (photographed by Henricus Marinus Neeb).

Total population
- 93,000

Regions with significant populations
- Indonesia (Aceh)

Languages
- Alas and Indonesian

Religion
- Islam

Related ethnic groups
- Kluet people, Singkil people, Karo people

The Alas people (Batak Alas-Kluet: Ukhang Alas) are an indigenous Batak sub-ethnic group from Southeast Aceh Regency, Aceh, Sumatra, Indonesia. The Alas are found in the Gunung Leuser, Ketambe, and Alas River areas.

== Society ==
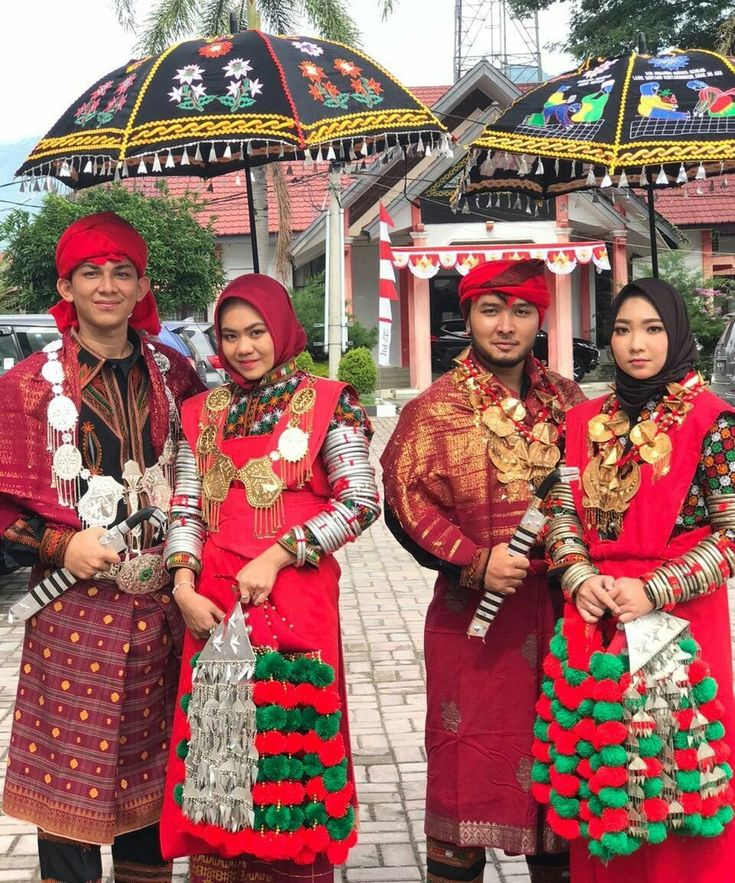
Alas couples

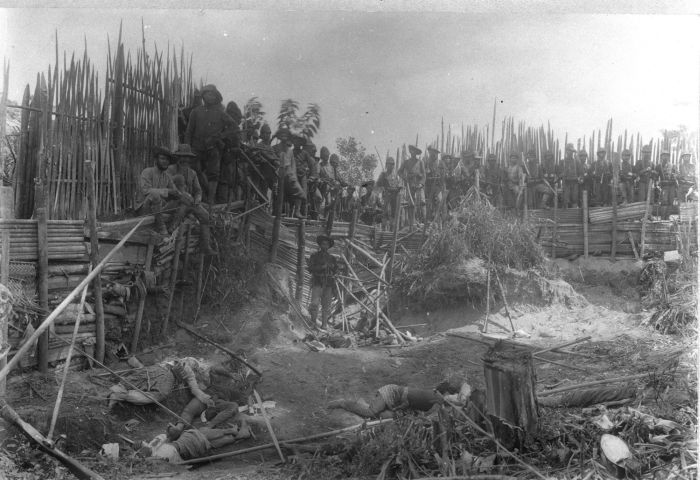
The Alas fort of Kuta Reh on 14 June 1904 (Photographed by Henricus Marinus Neeb)

The Alas (ukhang Alas or kalak Alas) are an agrarian people, who cultivate rice on irrigated fields, but some grow cash crops in gardens. Freshwater fishing in Alas River or brooks used to be indispensable as a source of animal protein, while raising fish in ponds is becoming important. Between the 15th and 17th centuries, they converted to Islam, The Alas society is a patrilineal descent society; each belongs to one exogamous clan. Sometimes an Alas village (kute) consists of a single clan, while several clans could frequently be observed in one village. As Alas clan names suggest, the Alas people have composite origins.

== Van Daalen's Alas, Batak and Gayo campaign ==
At the final stage of the Aceh War in 1904, Gotfried Coenraad Ernst van Daalen started on his campaign to Gayoland, Alasland, and Batakland in order to establish the Dutch colonial control over them. After demolishing 7 forts and killing nearly 1300 inhabitants in Gayoland, his Korps Marechaussee te voet appeared in the Alas valley on 10 June 1904. One local lord (kejukhun) at northern Alasland surrendered immediately, but, as the other local lord of Gayonese descent at southern Alasland had already been killed in Gayoland by Gotfried Coenraad Ernst van Daalen, his son, the acting southern local lord, and a brother of the northern local lord decided to confront the non-Islamic Dutch, building 3 forts or fortified villages.

On 14 June 1904, the Dutch troops demolished the fort of Kuta Reh, killing 313 indigenous men, 189 women, and 59 children, while 2 Dutch soldiers were killed. On 20 June 1904, then, they demolished the fort of Likat, killing 220 men, 124 women, and 88 children, while a single soldier was killed. Indeed, the village of Likat was one of Gayonese migrants into the Alas valley. On 24 June 1904, finally, they demolished the fort of Kute Lengat Baru, killing 338 men, 186 women, and 130 children, including the acting southern local lord, while 3 soldiers were killed. On 29 June 1904, Gotfried Coenraad Ernst van Daalen summoned the northern local lord and the son of the deceased southern local lord with all other Alas chiefs and headmen to the village of Pedesi in front of him, to declare that the whole of Alasland belonged to the Dutch East Indies.

During this campaign, Henricus Marinus Neeb, a military doctor, took many photos, including ones of fighting scenes, marching through the tropical rain forest, local fishing activities, traditional houses, mosques, and so on.

== Language ==
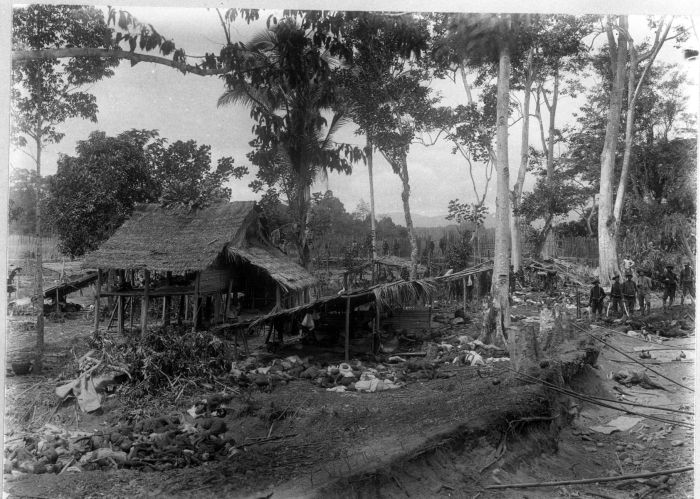
Another view of Kuta Reh on 14 June 1904 (Photographed by Henricus Marinus Neeb)

The Alas people uses the Alas language (Cekhok Alas) on a daily basis. The Alas language is most closely related to the language of the Kluet people in Aceh Selatan Regency, and often, these two languages are unified under a single label Alas–Kluet. Together with Karo and Dairi, Alas–Kluet belongs to the northern branch of the Batak subgroup of the Austronesian language family. It is estimated that 80,000 people spoke the language in 2000. Although Alas people live in Aceh Province, the language they use is entirely distinct from Acehnese.

== Clans ==
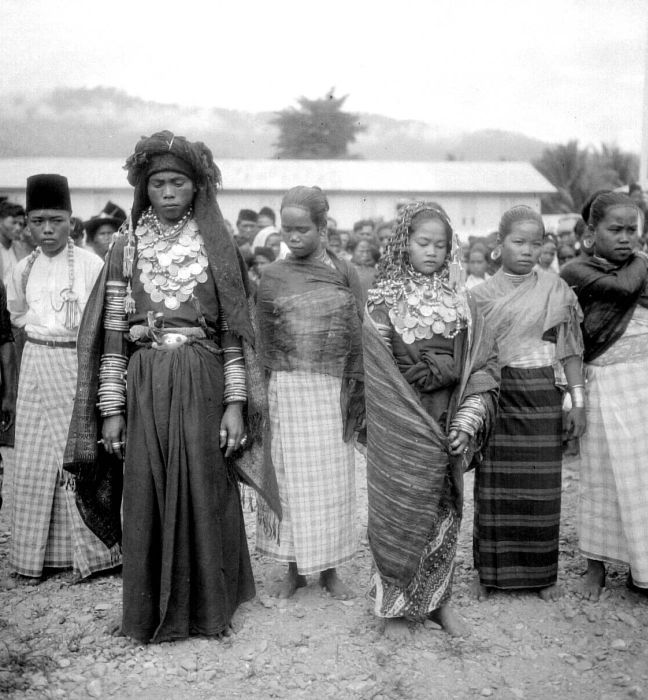
Alas bride and bridegroom

Each Alas person belongs to a patrilineal clan or descent group (mekhge). It has its own name, which is used as surname of the Alas people. In 1988 there were 27 clans as follows, but some had already had no member. Out of them, 8 clans, viz. Bangko, Cibekho, Deski, Keling, Kepale Dese, Kekhuas, Pagan, and Selian, are believed to be original among the Alas.

- Bangko
- Deski
- Keling
- Kepale Dese
- Kekhuas
- Pagan
- Selian
- Acih
- Bekhuh
- Gale
- Kekakho
- Mahe
- Menalu
- Mencawan (Bencawan)
- Munte
- Pase
- Pelis
- Pinim
- Ramin
- Ramud
- Sambo
- Sekedang
- Sugihen
- Sepayung
- Tekhigan
- Cibekho
- Sinage

== Arts ==
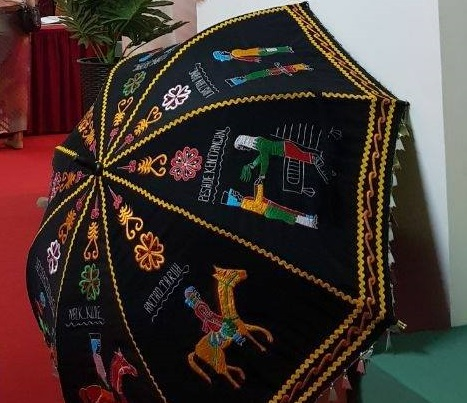
Alas ritual umbrella

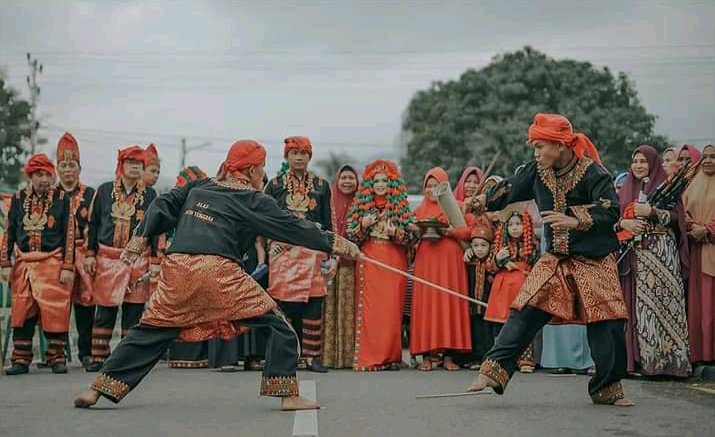
Two people are dancing the traditional Alas dance (Peulebat dance)

Alas traditional dances and musical instruments are as follows:

- Mesekat dance
- Pelabat dance
- Landok alun dance
- Tangis dilo
- Canang situ
- Canang buluh
- Genggong
- Oloi-olio
- Keketuk layakh

== Crafts ==
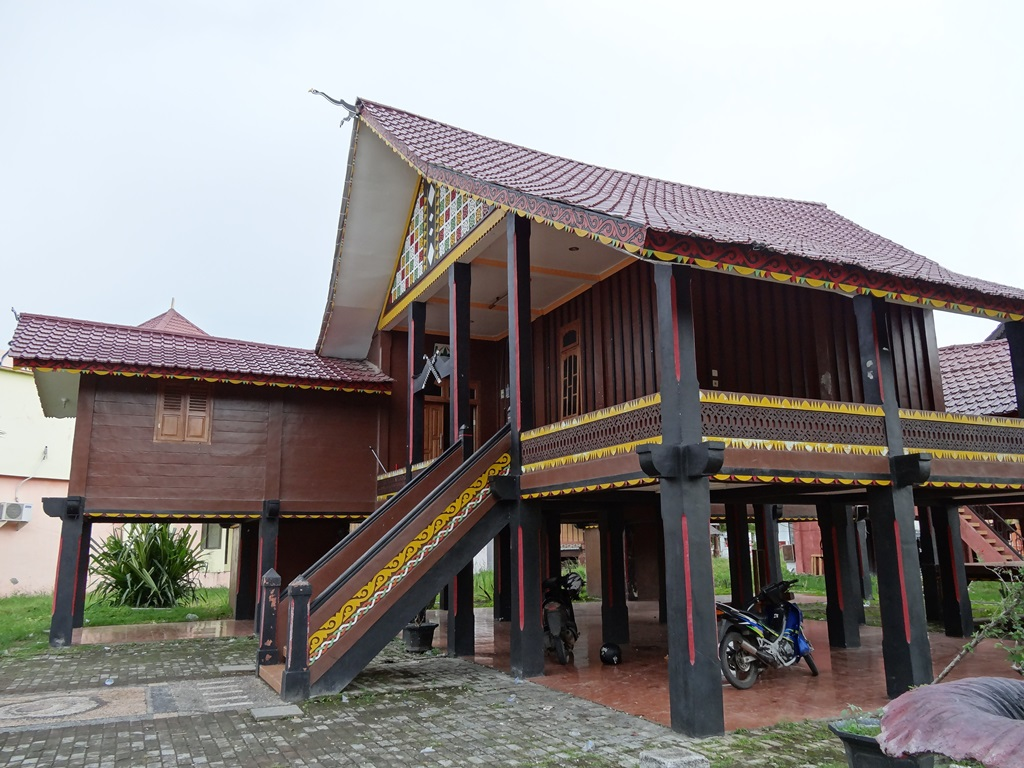
Alas traditional house (replica)

Alas traditional crafts are as follows:

- Nemet (weaving of rumbia leaves)
- Mbayu amak (pandan mat)
- Bordikh (customary attire)
- Pisau bekhemu (Alas traditional sword)
- Payung mesikhat (Alas ritual umbrella)

== Traditional dishes ==
Alas traditional dishes are as follows:

- Manuk labakh
- Ikan labakh
- Puket megaukh
- Lepat bekhas
- Gelame
- Puket megaluh
- Buah khum-khum
- Ikan pacik kule
- Telukh mandi
- Puket mekuah
- Tumpi
- Godekhr
- Puket sekuning
- Cimpe
- Getuk

== See also ==
- Alas language
- Payung mesikhat
- Aceh War
- Kuta Reh massacre
- Gotfried Coenraad Ernst van Daalen
- Henricus Marinus Neeb
- Gayo people
