= Korps Marechaussee te voet =

Colonial military police in the Dutch East Indies (1890–1942)

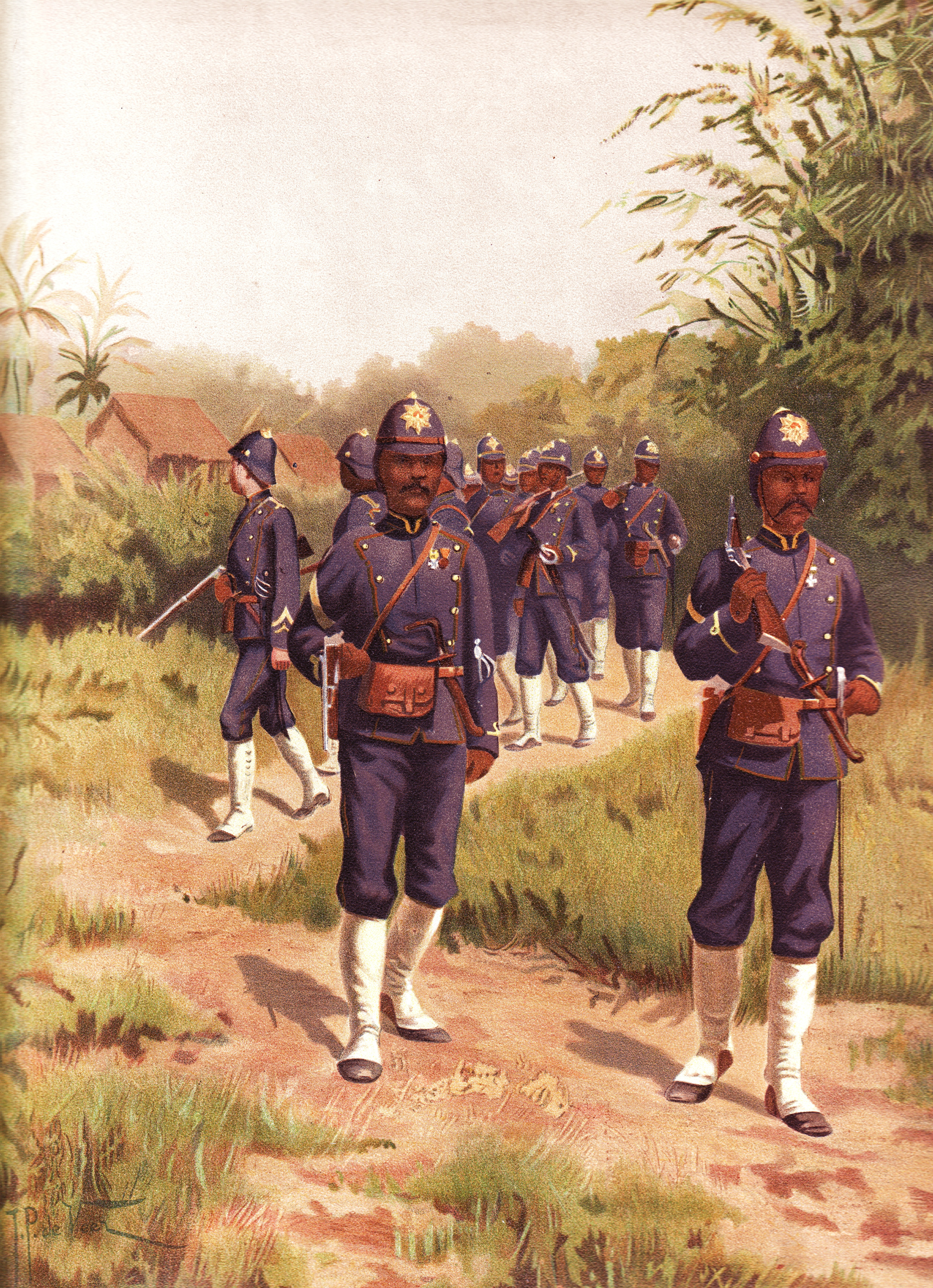
- Native marechaussee in uniform circa 1900, by Jan Hoynck van Papendrecht
- Founded: 2 April 1890
- Disbanded: 1942
- Headquarters: (Netherlands) Batavia

Leadership
- Commander-in-Chief: G. G. J. Notten; G. J. W. C. H. Graafland; J. B. van Heutsz

The Korps Marechaussee te voet, also known as Korps Marechaussee van Atjeh en Onderhoorigheden, was an elite gendarmerie unit of the Royal Netherlands East Indies Army (KNIL). While initially used for securing and guarding fortifications during the Aceh War, it later focused on counter-insurgency in the Dutch East Indies.

== History ==
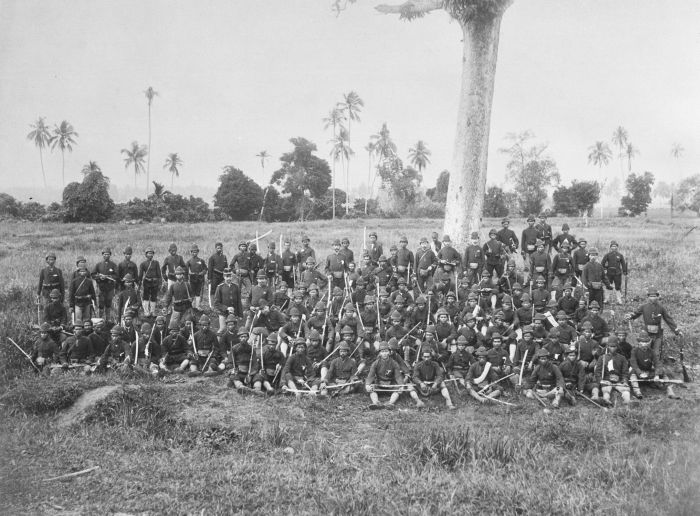
Group portrait of a brigade of the Korps Marechaussee in Aceh

The Korps Marechaussee was founded on 2 April 1890 and was originally tasked with securing and guarding fortifications within the concentrated line in Groot-Atjèh during the Aceh War. Later it focused on counter-insurgency and was divided into divisions with each division making up several brigades.

The Marechaussee was commanded by European officers and consisted of native Indonesians and Africans. The commander of the Korps Marechausee earned the same salary as his peers serving in the infantry of the KNIL, while officers earned the same as their peers serving in the engineer corps.

== Aceh War ==
In 1898 Van Heutsz was proclaimed governor of Aceh, and with his lieutenant, later Dutch Prime Minister Hendrikus Colijn, would finally conquer most of Aceh. They followed Hurgronje's suggestions, finding cooperative uleebelang or secular chiefs that would support them in the countryside and isolating the resistance from their rural support base. The Dutch formulated a new strategy of counter-insurgency warfare by deploying light-armed Marechaussee units and using scorched earth tactics. Van Heutsz charged Colonel Gotfried Coenraad Ernst van Daalen with breaking remaining resistance. G.C.E. van Daalen destroyed several villages, killing at least 2,900 Acehnese, among which were 1,150 women and children. Dutch losses numbered 26, and Van Daalen was promoted.

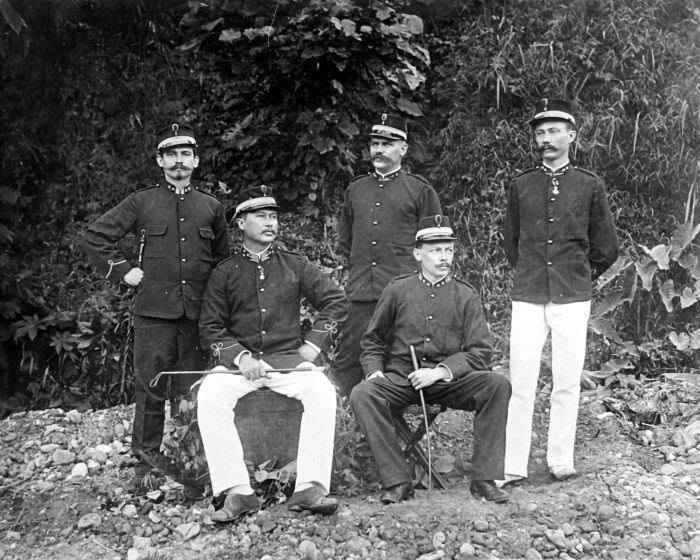
Van Daalen (second from the left) and four of his senior officers during the "Gajo-, Alas-, and Batak Campaign", 1904.

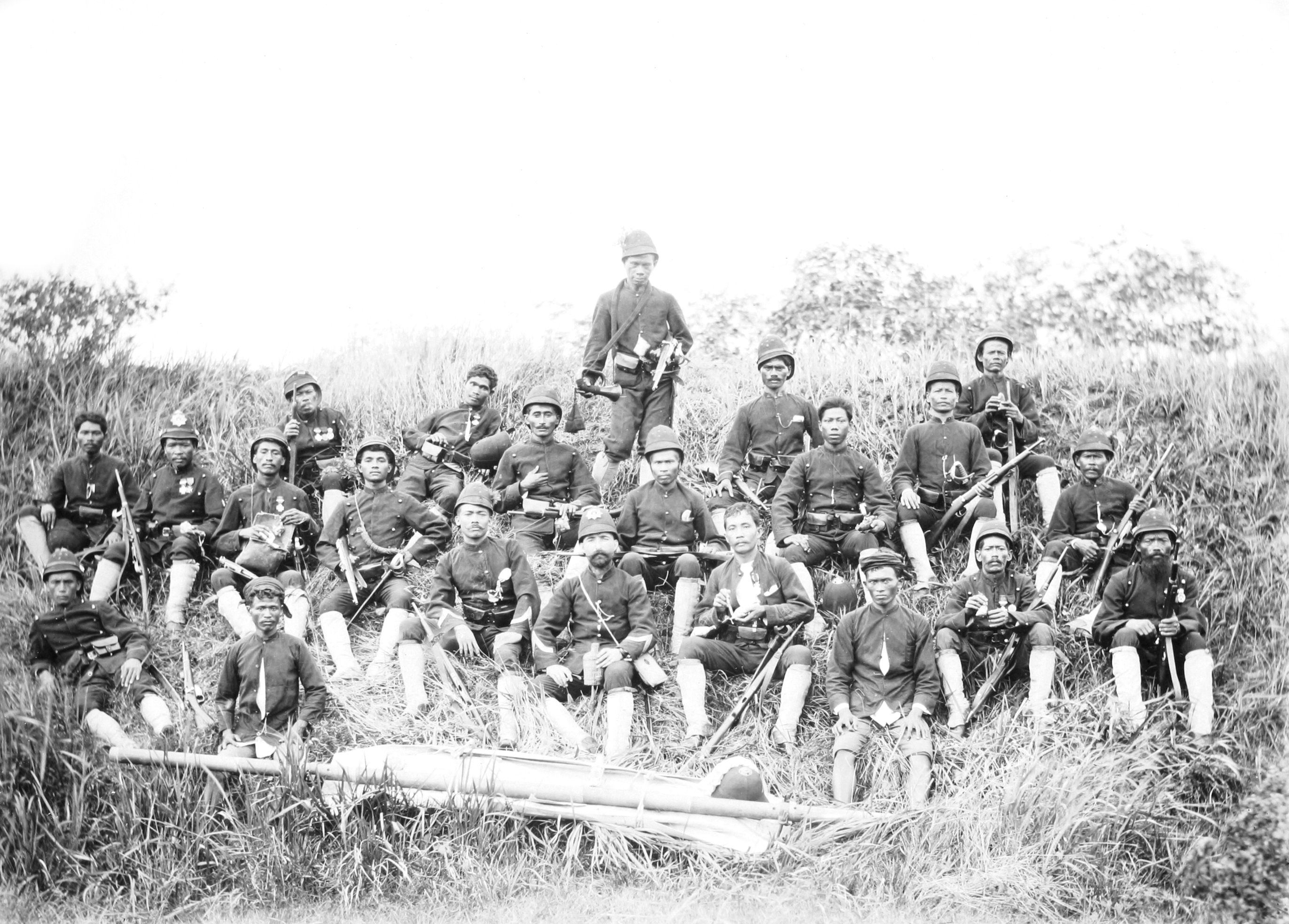
The 6th Brigade 3rd Division of the Korps Marechaussee in Lamnjong in Aceh (1898)

In 1903, the main secular Acehnese resistance leaders including Sultan Muhammad Daud, Tuanku Raja Keumala, Mahmud and Muda Perkasa capitulated. By 1904 most of Aceh was under Dutch control, and had an indigenous government that cooperated with the colonial state. The Dutch consolidated their control over Aceh by practising a policy of religious tolerance as a means of dissuading the Acehnese from taking up an armed struggle. Nevertheless, episodes of marked Dutch military cruelty still occurred during this period. Photographs of a Dutch slaughter in Koeto Reh village of the Alas people taken during a Dutch military expedition in Aceh's Gayo and Alas regions in 1904, for example, indicate that killings of large groups of civilians occurred on some occasions. Estimated total casualties on the Aceh side range from 50,000 to 60,000 dead, and over a million wounded. The destruction of entire communities also caused 10,000 Acehnese to flee to neighbouring Malaya.

In the Netherlands at the time, Van Heutsz was considered a hero, named the 'Pacifier of Aceh' and was promoted to become governor-general of the entire Dutch Indies in 1904. A still-existent monument to him was erected in Amsterdam, though his image and name were later removed, to protest his violent legacy. The Dutch establishment defended its actions in Aceh by citing a moral imperative to liberate the masses from the oppression and backward practices of independent native rulers that did not meet accepted international norms. The Aceh War also encouraged Dutch annexation of other independent states in Bali, Moluccas, Borneo and Sulawesi between 1901 and 1910. Colonial influence in the remote highland areas of Aceh was never substantial, however, and limited guerrilla resistance led by religious ulema persisted until 1942. Unable to dislodge the Dutch, many of the ulema gradually discontinued their resistance. The region of Gayo remained a center of resistance as late as 1914. One intellectual Sayyid Ahmad Khan advocated discontinuing the "jihad" against the Dutch since the term was used to define military warfare against religious oppression.

== Elite corps ==
After 1890 the Corps continued as an elite corps of the KNIL;

- Specialized in offensive surprise tactics;
- Conducts intensive patrols deep into the jungle.

== Lightly armed military police ==
The Korps Marechaussee were lightly armed, each soldier carrying a carbine version of the Dutch Mannlicher rifle and a klewang, allowing them to move quickly through the jungle. The carbine was lightweight (three and a half kilo) and compact (95 cm long), ideal for the typically small-statured indigenous soldiers.

== Tactical concept ==
Eventually the Royal Dutch East Indies Army (KNIL) took over the tactical plan of the Korps Marechaussee entirely. The trooper-carbine became, in 1912, the standard weapon of all native soldiers of the KNIL.

== Citations ==
=== Bibliography ===
- Boogaard, F.H. (1902). "De taktiek der Maréchaussée in Groot-Atjeh in 1896". De Militaire Gids (in Dutch). Vol. 21. Haarlem: De Erven F. Bohn. pp. 65–89.
- Bos, M.J.E. (1913). De strijd tegen den inlandschen vijand (in Dutch). Breda: De Koninklijke Militaire Academie.
- Colijn, H.; van Heutsz, J.B., eds. (1913). Neerlands Indië: Land en volk, geschiedenis en bestuur, bedrijf en samenleving (in Dutch). Vol. II. Amsterdam: Elsevier.
- de Graaff, S.; Stibbe, D.G.; Wintgens, W.C.B., eds. (1918). Encyclopaedie van Nederlandsch-Indië (in Dutch). Vol. II: H-M. The Hague: Martinus Nijhoff.
- Sieburgh, G.J. (1918). Organisatie en indeeling van de Land- en Zeemacht in Nederlands Oost-Indië (in Dutch). Breda: De Koninklijke Militaire Academie.
- https://web.archive.org/web/20131102095205/http://www.defensie.nl/landmacht/cultureel/geschiedenis/het_leger_in_indi/oprichting_van_het_korps_marechaussee
- http://www.defensie.nl/media/the_roots_klein_tcm46-154293.pdf

== See also ==
- Gotfried Coenraad Ernst van Daalen
- Henricus Marinus Neeb
- Aceh War
- Kuta Reh massacre
