= Gotfried Coenraad Ernst van Daalen =

19/20th-century army general and politician in the Dutch East Indies

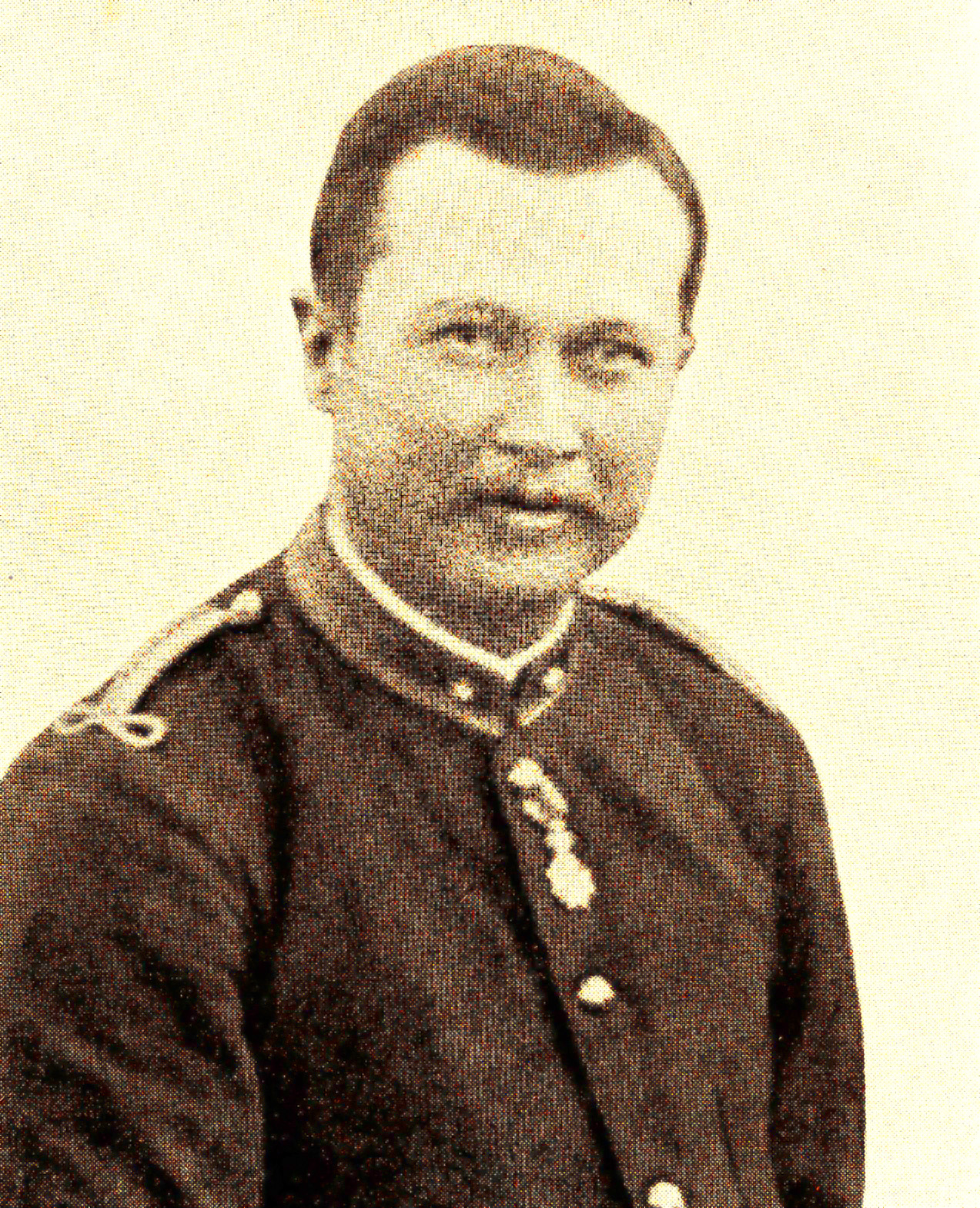
- Frits van Daalen
- Born: 23 March 1863; Makassar, Dutch East Indies
- Died: 22 February 1930 (aged 66) The Hague, Netherlands
- Allegiance: Netherlands
- Branch: Royal Dutch East Indies Army
- Rank: Lieutenant General
- Commands: KNIL
- Conflicts: Aceh War

Gotfried Coenraad Ernst "Frits" van Daalen (23 March 1863 – 22 February 1930) was a Dutch military officer of the Royal Dutch East Indies Army who served as the Governor of Aceh from 1905 until 1908. During the Aceh War, van Daalen and his men were responsible for the Kuta Reh massacre, in which hundreds of men, women, and children were killed.

== Biography ==
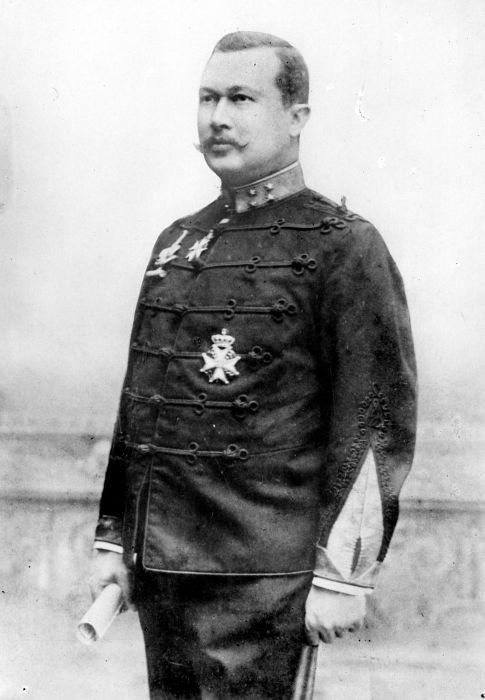
Van Daalen

Van Daalen was named after his Dutch father, Gotfried Coenraad Ernst (Frits) van Daalen, who was born in 's-Hertogenbosch, the Netherlands on 23 July 1836 and died in Surabaya on 13 May 1889), who was also a famous, decorated KNIL officer and a veteran of the Aceh War and who was discharged from service as a consequence of a scandal in which he publicly offended the Governor-General of the colony.

On 30 March 1899 he was transferred to the Korps Marechaussee te voet.

As a young officer with the rank of lieutenant and captain, van Daalen was awarded several prestigious military distinctions for proven bravery. He first became Knight of the Military William Order in 1890, was awarded the Honorary Sabre by the Dutch monarch in 1897 and was followed by his becoming an Officer of the Military Willem Order in 1898. Many other distinctions followed in the later part of his career.

Although notorious for his controversial approach during the final phases of the protracted Aceh War and his consequent conflicts with both Van Heutsz and Snouck Hurgronje, he was appointed as Governor of Aceh between 1905 and 1908.

He was eventually promoted to the highest rank of luitenant-generaal in 1909 and became commander of the KNIL in 1910, before he retired and returned to Europe in 1914.

== Controversy ==
Van Daalen's Gajo-, Alas-, and Batak Campaign of the Aceh War in 1904 is mostly remembered for his brutal crackdown of the last Acehnese and Batak pockets of resistance. His force included 10 European officers, 13 European non-commissioned officers, and 208 Javanese and Ambonese military police officers (Dutch: Marechaussee). Particularly, the battle at Koetö Réh, which was built by the Alas people, stood out, as the rebels refused to surrender, and the death toll of 561 fighters included 189 women and 59 children. During the 1904 campaign, van Daalen lost 12 men and caused the death of at least 2,922 civilians, including at least 1,149 women and children.

The press reported on the death toll, and it later published images of the brutal warfare in Aceh that shocked Dutch public opinion. Heavy criticism from the Dutch House of Representatives called for an investigation into the alleged atrocities and damaged the KNIL's overall prestige. In the heated debate, van Daalen himself was compared to the Iron Duke of Alba, a Spanish ruler who was notoriously harsh and cruel from Dutch national history. During the investigation, van Daalen turned in his resignation.

Although absolved from any crimes, van Daalen had a permanent stain on his reputation, and all of his subsequent promotions were contentious. After the investigation, van Daalen re-enlisted.

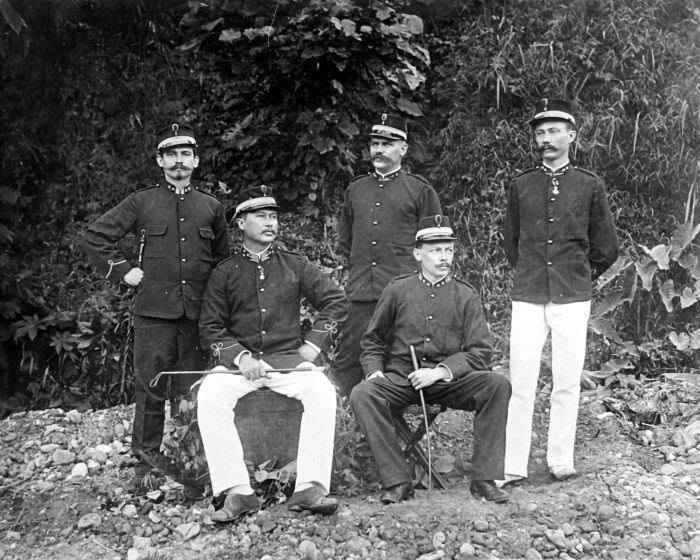
Van Daalen (second from the left) and four of his senior officers during the "Gajo-, Alas-, and Batak Campaign", 1904.

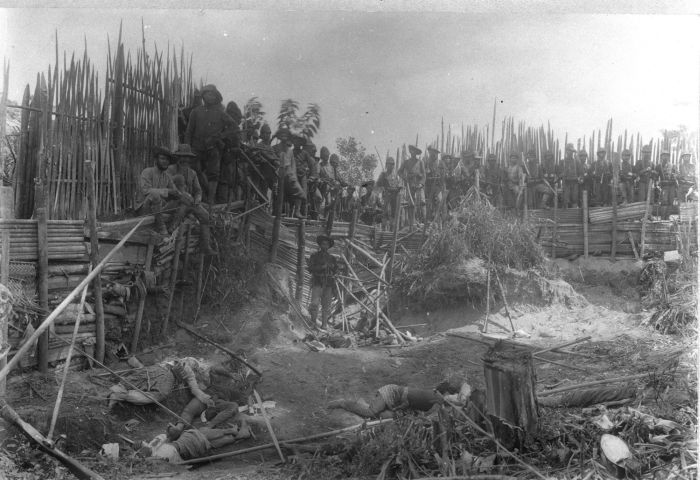
The infamous photograph of the Koetö Réh rebel stronghold in Alasland after the KNIL troops destroyed it that swayed Dutch public opinion against Van Daalen's brutal approach during the final stages of the Aceh War.

== See also ==
- Aceh War
- Kuta Reh massacre
- Alas people
- Gayonese people
- Henricus Marinus Neeb
- Mỹ Lai massacre
