= Henricus Marinus Neeb =

Dutch military doctor

Henricus Marinus Neeb, often recorded as H.M. Neeb, (22 November 1870 in Muntok, Bangka Island, Sumatra - 15 September 1933 in Bandung, Indonesia) was a Dutch military doctor during the later stages of the long lasting Aceh War. He photographed sights in the area beginning in 1904 including architecture, indigenous peoples, colonial buildings such rail infrastructure and buildings, topography, scenes of Dutch soldiers, and Acehnese killed in the conflict.

Neeb was born in Muntok on Bangka Island on the coast of eastern Sumatra. His father, P. G. Neeb, was also a military doctor.

Neeb studied medicine in Leiden, Netherlands and joined the Royal Netherlands East Indies Army (KNIL) in 1892. He was stationed at the military hospital of Surabaya and other stations before being dispatched to Kotaraja in June 1903. He served under Gotfried Coenraad Ernst van Daalen's command in the regions of Gayo, Alas and Batak, and remained in Aceh until at least 24 November 1907, when he photographed scenes in Sidikalang.

Photographs from a medical congress in Manila to study American hospitals there in 1910 are the only known photographs taken later in his career. He died on 15 September 1933 and is buried in Bandung.

J.C.J. Kempees, Van Daalen's aide-de-camp, published some of his photos in his 1905 book and notes that Neeb utilized a portable dark room. Neeb included detailed captions on his prints.

== Gallery ==
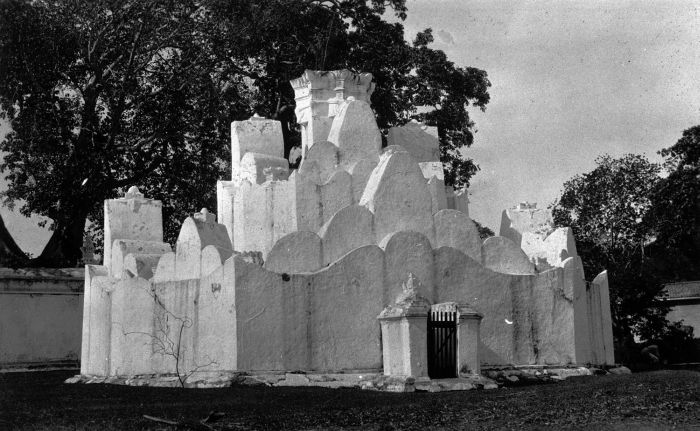
Monument at the pleasure garden in Kotaraja (now part of Gunongan Historical Park)

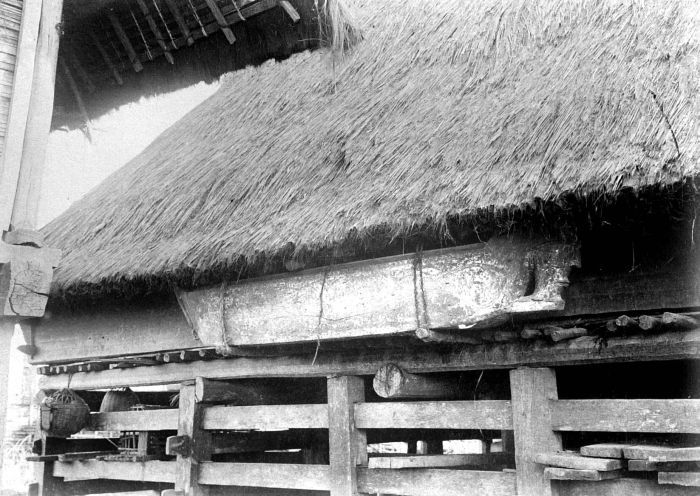
Funeral casket "Lantuh?" containing the body of a village elder

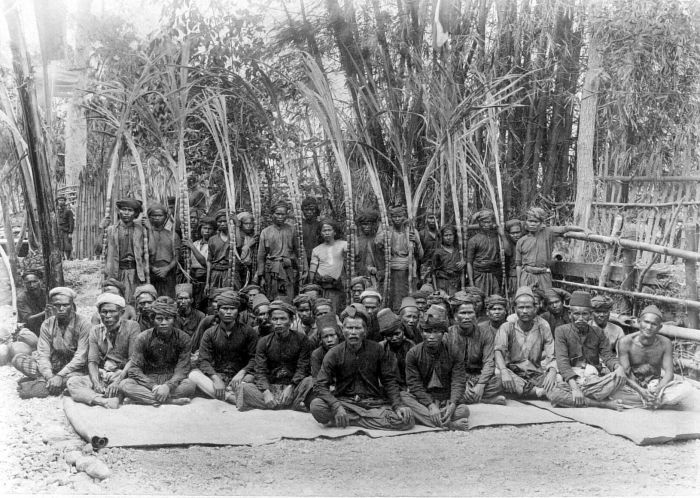
Local leaders and cane offerings as tribute to Gotfried Coenraad Ernst van Daalen

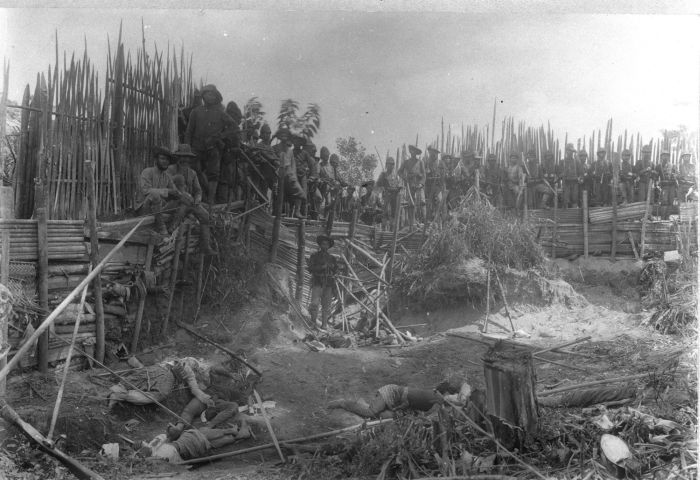
Dutch troops at the fortified village of Kute Rih with dead Alas people

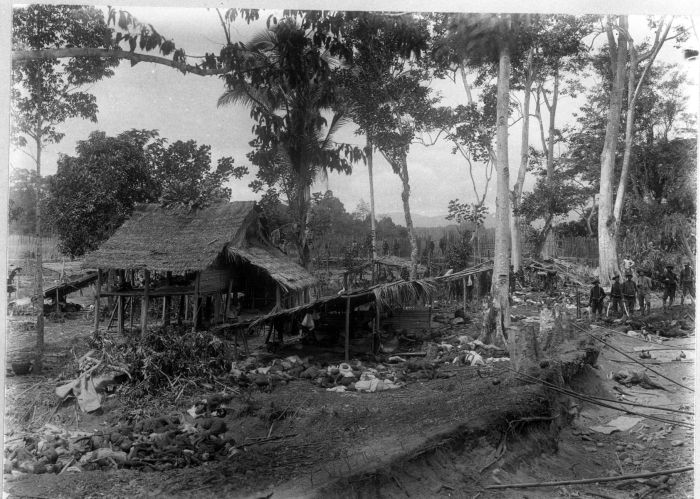
Another view of Dutch soldiers at the fortified village of Kute Rih among dead Alas people

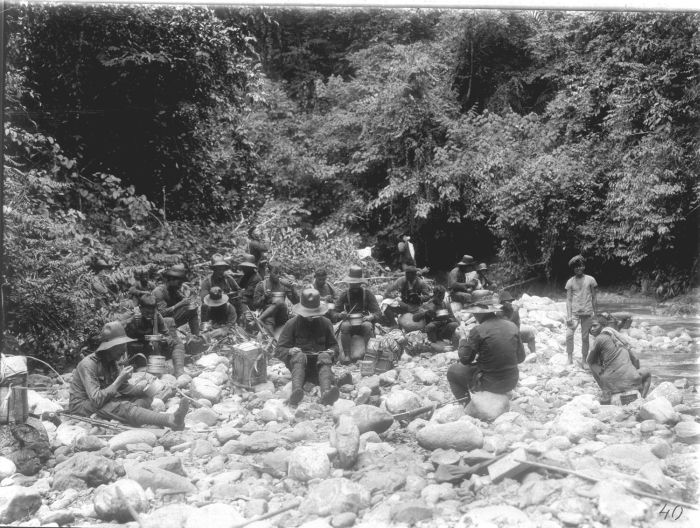
A Dutch military patrol on break during the Aceh War

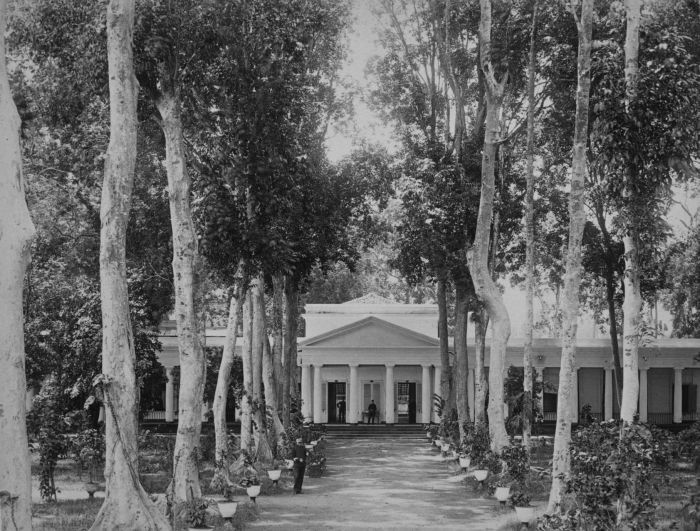
Dutch officer's military hospital

== See also ==
- Christiaan Benjamin Nieuwenhuis, another Dutchman who served in the East Indies and photographed local sights
- Gotfried Coenraad Ernst van Daalen
- Aceh War
- Alas people
- Gayonese people
