= Kuta Raja =

- District
- Interactive map of Kuta Raja
- Country: Indonesia
- Province: Aceh
- City: Banda Aceh

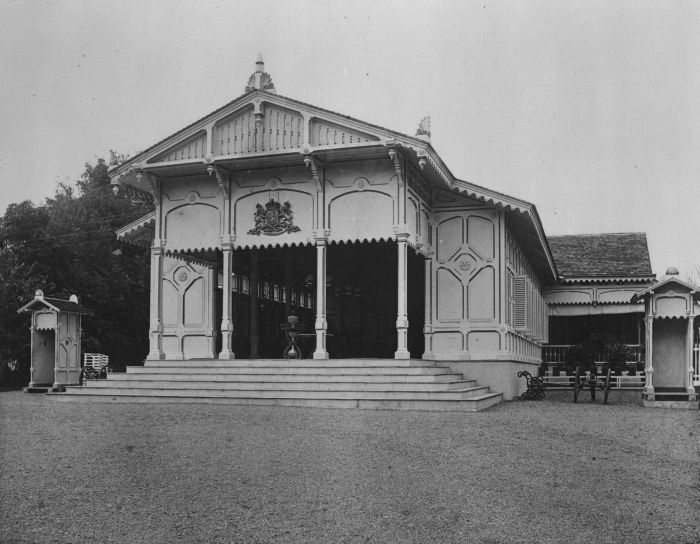
Governor house in Kotaraja, Aceh

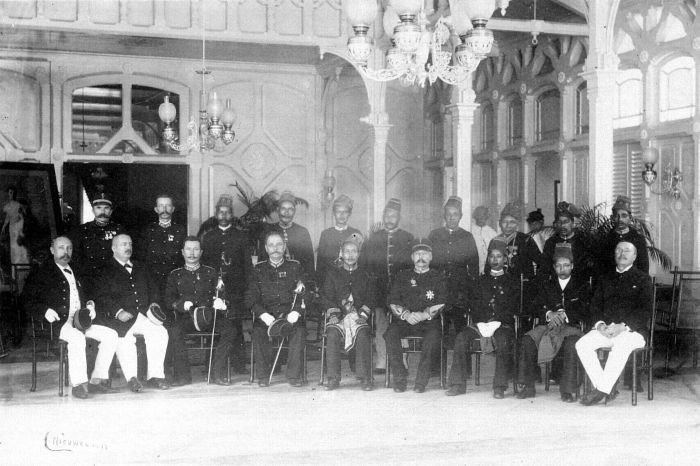
At the government building in Kotaraja January 20, 1903

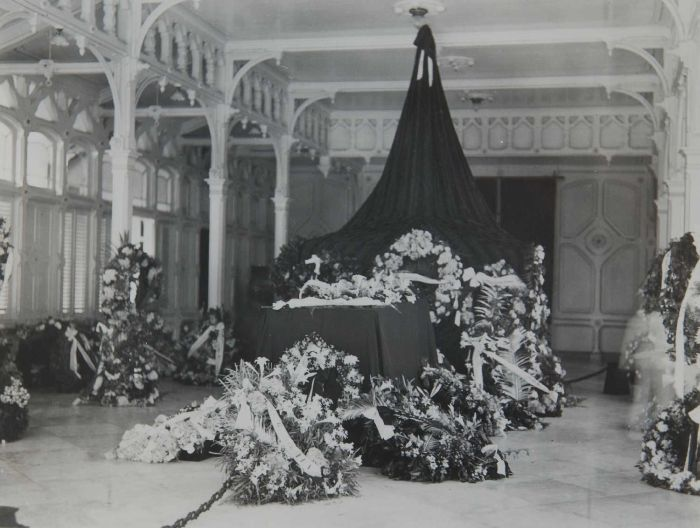
Coffin of A.P. van Aken in governor house of Aceh in Kotaraja

Kuta Raja also written as Koetaradja, Kotaraja and Kota Raja, was the name the Dutch gave to the capital of the Aceh Sultanate in the Aceh region of Sumatra. The name translates to mean "Kingtown" or "Princetown". It became part of the Dutch East Indies after the Aceh War. Dutch rule ended with World War II. After Indonesia became independent the city was renamed Banda Aceh.

Kuta Raja is now the name a district in the city of Banda Aceh. Villages in the district include:

- Lampaseh City
- Merduati
- Keudah
- Peulanggahan
- Java Gampong
- Gampong Pande

== History ==
Kuta Raja was a powerful economic center as a sultanate in the 16th century. The Dutch took over much of Sumatra from British rule in the late 19th century. Kuta Raja was conquered from its rule as a sultanate in the late 19th century.

== Gallery ==
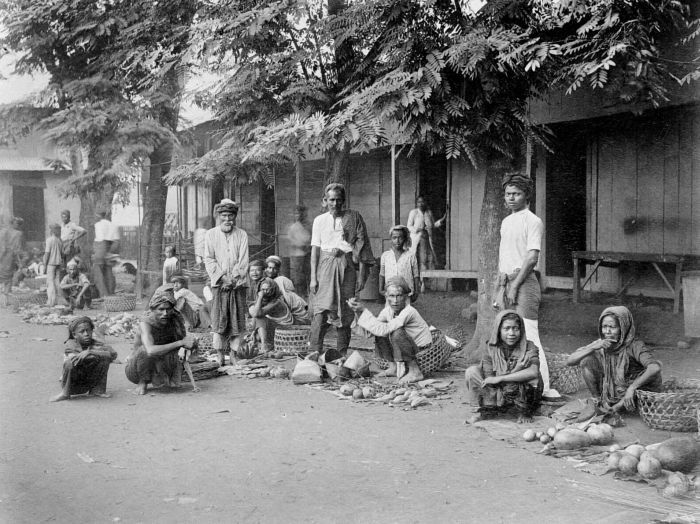
Vegetable market in Kotaraja
