= Teungku Fakinah =

- Born: 1856; Lam Beunot, Aceh Sultanate
- Died: 10 October 1940 (aged 83-84); Beuha, Dutch East Indies
- Spouse(s): Tengku Ahmad (1872-1873); Tengku Nyai Badai (?-1896); Tengku Ibrahim (1914-1918)
- Military career
- Allegiance: Aceh Sultanate
- Service years: ?–1910
- Conflicts: Aceh War

Teungku Fakinah (1856 – 10 October 1940) was an Acehnese female warrior and Islamic scholar.

== Early life and education ==
Fakinah was born in Lam Beunot in 1856 to Tengku Datuk, who was an Aceh Sultanate Government official, and Tengku Fathimah. She received education from her parents. Her mother taught her the Quran, Islam, Arabic, sewing, weaving, cooking, and embroidering, whereas her father tutored her on hadith, fiqh, tasawwuf, history, and Arabic. She also received a basic military education. During her military training, she met a young cleric named Tengku Ahmad, and she decided to marry him in 1872. Upon marriage, the couple taught religion at Dayah Lam Pucok (Lam Pucok Islamic boarding school). Due to her presence, female students began to study at Dayah Lam Pucok and she taught them sewing and filigree.

== Aceh War ==
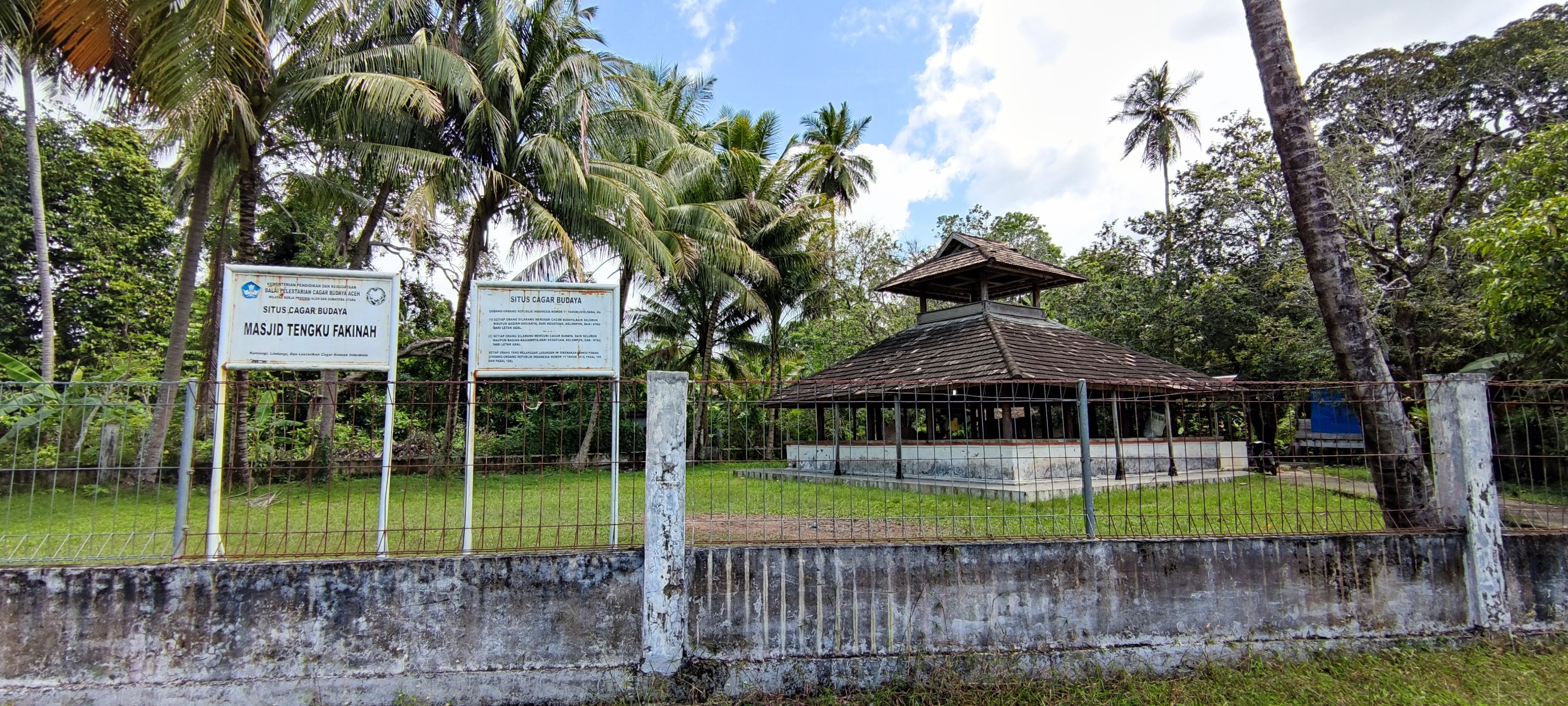
Teungku Fakinah Mosque

In 1873, the Dutch declared war against Aceh Sultanate and Dayah Lam Pucok provided military training to the students to fight the Dutch. On 8 April 1873, Tengku Ahmad and his pupils fought against the Dutch in Cermin Beach, and he died during the battle, causing Fakinah to become a widow. After the death of Tengku Ahmad, Fakinah established a body whose members consisted of women, especially widows. This body was tasked to coordinate financial and logistic support for Acehnese resistance and provide medical treatment for wounded soldiers. She also visited several places in Great Aceh to collect money and logistic supplies from wealthy people and local figures to assist the Aceh resistance forces. Through traveling, she befriended the wife of Acehnese warriors.

As the strength of Aceh Resistance forces waned, Sultan Alauddin Mahmud Syah II instructed the people to create voluntary militias. Responding to the sultan's instruction, Fakinah created a militia that she named sukey. Her militia consisted of four balangs (battalion). Each balang had one kuta (defense fort). Fakinah and her peers oversaw the construction of the Cot Weue fort until it was finished. Afterward, Fakinah created and commanded the all-women battalion and placed her troops at Cot Weue; thus, the fort became her headquarters.

Upon establishing the battalion and fort, Fakinah often conducted meetings with other leaders to discuss the war strategy. However, since she was the only military leader and women having a meeting with males without a chaperone was a taboo, Fakinah was matched with Tengku Nyai Badai from Pidie to prevent fitna. She agreed with that proposal, and she married for the second time. After marrying Nyai Badai, Fakinah continued her resistance against the Dutch and commanded five units. Moreover, she was also known as an expert in producing explosives. As the Dutch captured Cot Weue, she later moved her base to Ulee Tanoh.

During the war, Fakinah befriended Cut Nyak Dhien and donated food supplies to her. In return, she received logistic supplies for her troops. Upon hearing the news of Cut Nyak Dien's husband, Teuku Umar, defection and the rumor that his troops would attack Ulee Tanoh, Fakinah built three forts in Cot Pring, Cot Raja, and Cot Ukam. When two women visited Fakinah to deliver donations, Fakinah asked them to convey a message to Cut Nyak Dien that she ordered Teuku Umar to send his troops to Lamdiran and fight against Fakinah and her troop of widows so that people could see her bravery. Subsequently, the two women conveyed this message to Cut Nyak Dien and she persuaded Teuku Umar to defect from the Dutch through his assistant, Pang Karim. Upon hearing Fakinah's call to fight in her fort, Teuku Umar decided to rejoin the Acehnese resistance.

On 3 June 1896, KNIL troops led by Colonel J.W Stempoort launched an attack on Fakinah's forts, and they managed to capture those, causing her to flee and build another defense fort in Cot Piring. As the Dutch intensified its military operations, Fakinah was forced to retreat to Gleleung and then Inderapura in August 1896. During her hiding, a tiger killed Nyai Badai. Afterward, Fakinah moved to Blang Peuneulen and established an Islamic boarding school for women. In April 1899, KNIL attacked Blang Peuneulen and looted gold at Fakinah's house. Fakinah was able to flee with her troops. However, she was no longer able to erect a fort and opted to wage guerilla attacks in Pasai Mountain, Gayo Luas, and places near the Tawar Sea. When waging a guerilla war, she taught Islam to her female troops.

== Post-war ==
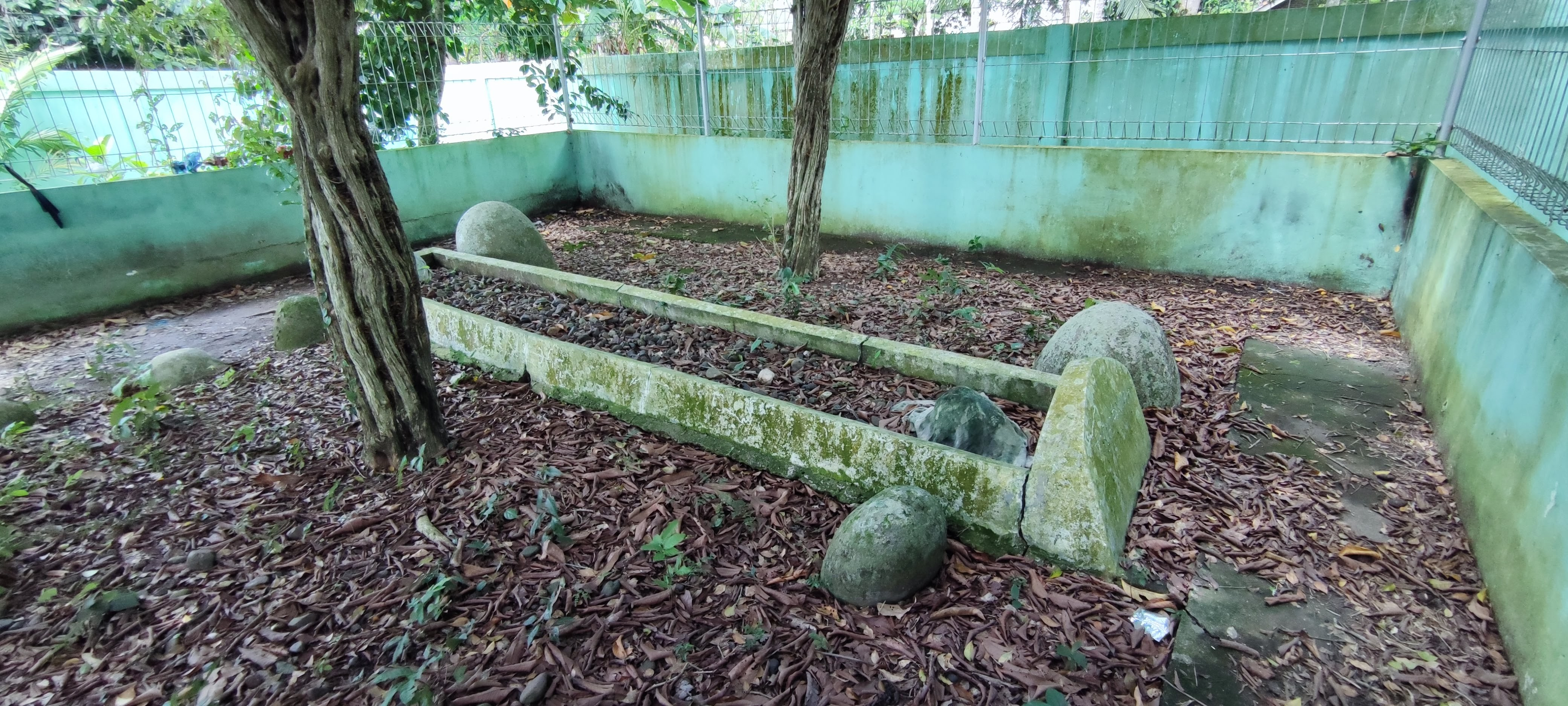
Teungku Fakinah's grave

In 1910, Panglima Polem IX ordered Fakinah to stop waging war and return to her homeland to establish an Islamic boarding school instead. She agreed to Polem's order and in 1911, she returned to her village and built an Islamic boarding school. After the school construction finished, she continued teaching Islam. The school not only received women but also men.

In 1914, she had an intention to go hajj, and yet she was a widow. Hence, she married Tengku Ibrahim. In the following year, she built a mosque with assistance from her students. Apart from that, she also constructed a long road that the locals named Ateung Seunabat. In June 1915, she went to Mecca with her husband for a hajj. When Fakinah and her husband arrived in Mecca, they went on hajj and stayed for three years. During three years of living in Mecca, the couple settled at Aceh Waqf house, where they learned Islam. Other than that, she met prominent Islamic figures from Egypt and other countries, and throughout her interaction with them, Fakinah found out that resisting Western colonization was not only by weapon but also through knowledge.

In 1918, Tengku Ibrahim died in Mecca and Fakinah returned to Aceh. As she arrived in Lam Krak, she continued to lead and teach at her Islamic boarding school. In 1925, Fakinah went hajj for the second time and decided to settle in Mecca for one year. Fakinah died in Beuha on 8 Ramadhan 1359 AH (10 October 1940).

== Legacy ==
Tengku Fakinah's name is immortalized as the name of a private hospital and a nursing school in Banda Aceh. Other than that, the locals still use the mosque constructed by Fakinah for meetings and Quran recitation, although it is no longer used as a place for salah due to the lack of spaces.

== Bibliography ==
- Atmosiswartoputra, Mulyono (2017). Perempuan-Perempuan Pengukir Sejarah. Bhuana Ilmu Populer.
- Ibrahim, Muchtaruddin (1996). Cut Nyak Din. Jakarta: The Directorate of History and Traditional Values.
- Uyuni, Badrah (2023). "Tengku Fakinah (D. 1933) Indonesia's Woman Ulama". International Journal of Sustainable Applied Sciences. 1 (1).
