= Genggong =

Mouth harp of Balinese origin

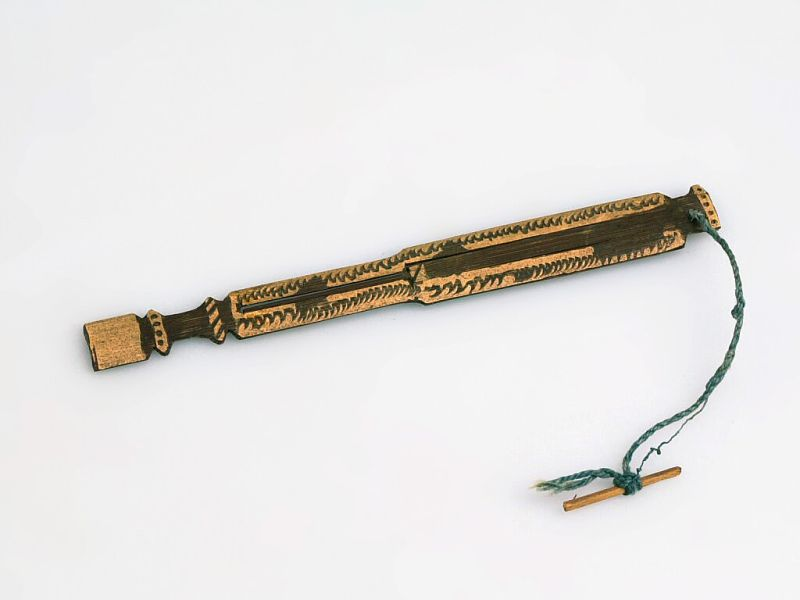
A genggong. The free end of the tongue points toward the left. The string, attached to the base of the tongue, is jerked to make it vibrate.

The genggong is a kind of jew's harp used in the music of Bali. It consists of a wooden frame and tongue cut from a single piece of the leaf stem of the sugar palm. The left end is held firmly against the cheek, while a string tied to the right end is jerked rhythmically to set the tongue into motion (in contrast to other jaw harps in which the tongue itself is plucked to produce sound). Different harmonics are produced by pronouncing different vowel sounds.

Very much a folk instrument, genggong was traditionally played only as a solo instrument or with small numbers of other genggong as informal entertainment. Since the 1930s, however, genggong has often featured in gamelan genggong, a larger ensemble of several genggong together with suling and percussion instruments.
