= Gayo people =

Ethnic group in Indonesia

Urang Gayo
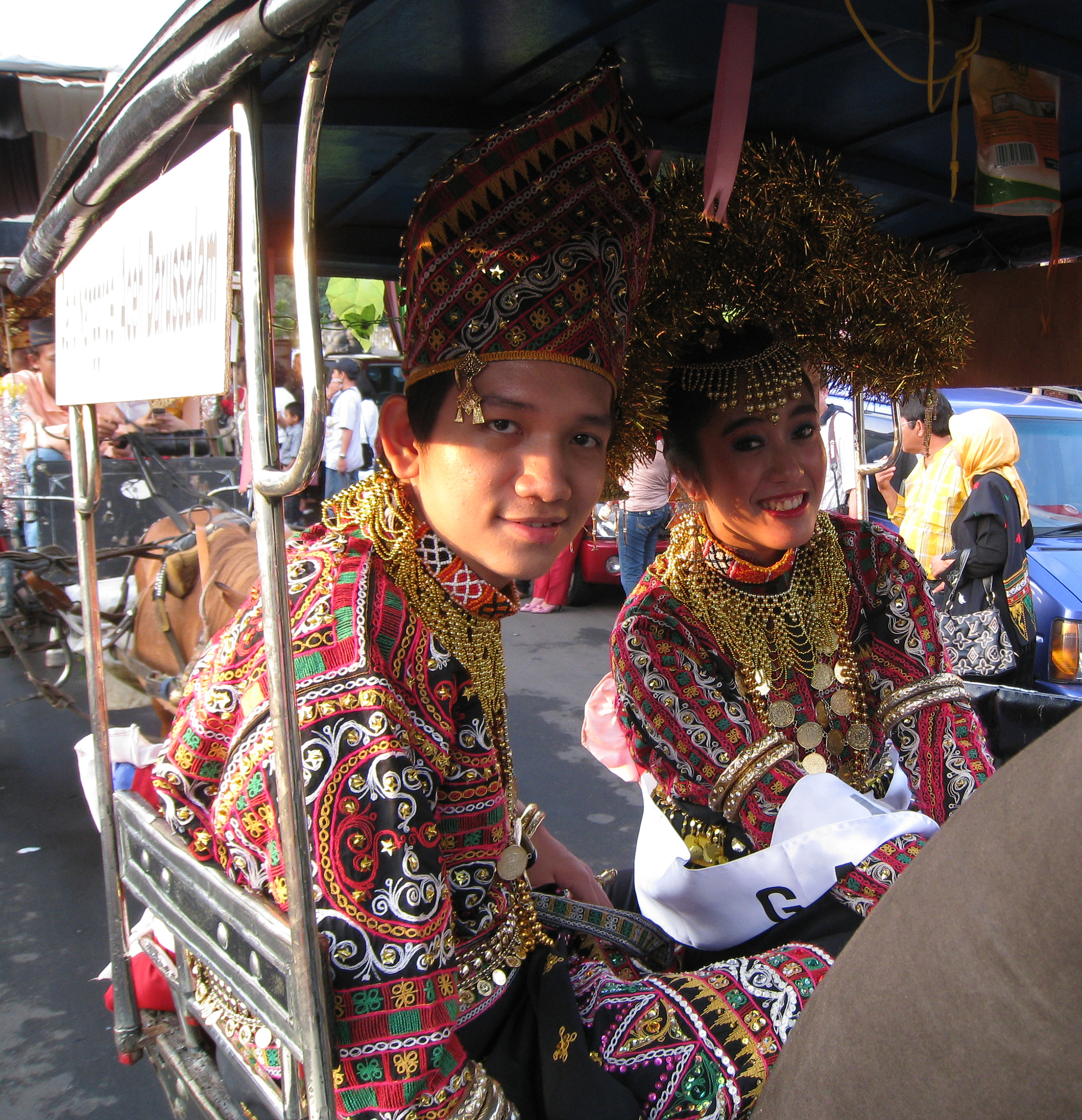
- A Gayonese couple in traditional attire.

Total population
- 336,856

Regions with significant populations
- Indonesia (Aceh)

Languages
- Gayo, Acehnese, and Indonesian

Religion
- Sunni Islam

Related ethnic groups
- Alas • Karo • Acehnese

The Gayo people (Gayo: Urang Gayo; Indonesian: Orang Gayo) are an Austronesian ethnic group living in the highlands (primarily Gayo Lues) of the province of Aceh, Sumatra, Indonesia. The Gayo people has a population of 336,856 and they live predominantly in the mountains. Most of them live in three regencies in Aceh, namely Bener Meriah, Central Aceh, and Gayo Lues. Some of them live in several districts in other regencies, such as Serbajadi, Simpang Jernih, Peunaron, and Birem Bayeun in East Aceh, Beutong and Beutong Ateuh Banggalang in Nagan Raya, and Cot Girek in North Aceh. Other than that, the Gayo population also covers Southeast Aceh Regency and Aceh Tamiang Regency. Their homeland lies in the Barisan Mountains which has elevations of over 12,000 feet and extends more than one thousand miles. The Gayo language has five dialects: Bukit, Dëret, Lues, Lut, and Serbejadi-Lukup. Their language does not have a writing system, but folk tales, stories and poetry are passed down in oral tradition. The traditional house of the Gayo is called umah.

== History ==
In the 11th century, the Linge Kingdom was established by the Gayo people during the reign of Sultan Makhdum Johan Berdaulat Mahmud Syah from the Perlak Sultanate, as it was told by two rulers who were ruling during the Dutch East Indies era; namely Raja Uyem and his son Raja Ranta, who is Raja Cik Bebesen, and also Zainuddin from the rulers of Kejurun Bukit. Raja Linge I is said to have four children. The eldest was his daughter, Empu Beru or Datu Beru, and the remaining are Sebayak Lingga (Ali Syah), Meurah Johan (Johan Syah) and Meurah Lingga (Malamsyah). Sebayak Lingga wandered off to Karo land and founded a country there and he was known as Raja Lingga Sibayak. Meurah Johan ventured on to Aceh Besar and established his kingdom by the name of Lam Krak or Lam Oeii or also known as Lamuri or Lamuri Sultanate. This would mean that the Lamuri Sultanate was founded by Meurah Johan, while Meurah Lingga who was living in Linge, Gayo and the rest became kings of Linge for generations. Meurah Silu migrated to Pasai and became an officer to the Pasai Sultanate there. Meurah Mege himself was buried with Ni Rayang at the slopes of Keramil Paluh in Linge, Central Aceh, which until today it can still be found and are considered sacred by the locals. The cause of migrating was unknown. However, according to history, Raja Linge favoured his youngest son, Meurah Mege, causing the rest of his children to prefer to wander away.

=== Linga dynasty ===
- Adi Genali Raja Linge I in Gayo.
  - Raja Sebayak Lingga became King of Karo in Karo land.
  - Raja Merah Johan, founded the Lamuri Sultanate.
  - Merah Silu, son of Merah Sinabung, founded Samudera Pasai Sultanate.
- Raja Linge II also known as Marah Lingga in Gayo.
- Raja Lingga III to XII in Gayo.
- Raja Lingga XIII became Amir al-Harb of Aceh Sultanate. In 1533, the new Johor Empire was founded in pre-independence Malaysia led by Sultan Alauddin Mansyur Syah. Raja Lingga XIII was appointed to be in the cabinet of the new government. His descendants established the Lingga Sultanate in Lingga Island of the Riau Islands, and his sovereignty extended to Riau Province (Indonesia), Temasek (Singapore) and parts of Malaya (Malaysia).

No documentation were recorded on the rulers of Sebayak Lingga Karo. During the era of Dutch East Indies, the monarchy was appointed again but for two eras only.

- Raja Sendi Sibayak Lingga, as chosen by the Dutch East Indies.
- Raja Kalilong Sibayak Lingga.

=== Dutch colonization ===
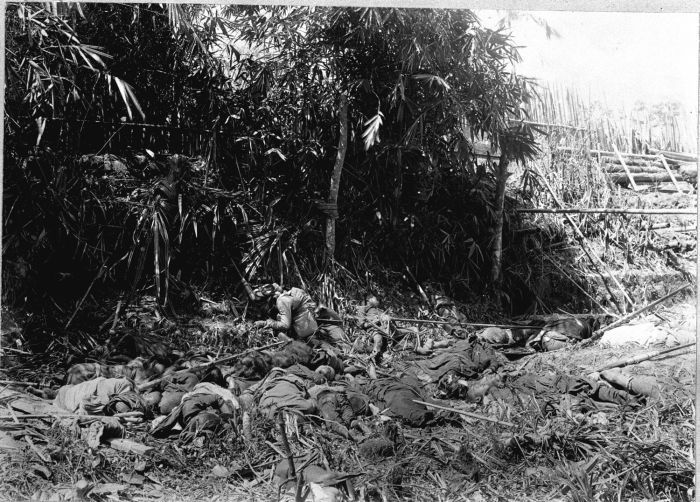
Gayo villagers at the fort of Likat killed by the Korps Marechaussee te voet during the Gayo, Alas, and Batak campaign led by Gotfried Coenraad Ernst van Daalen in 1904 (Photographed by Henricus Marinus Neeb).

After initial Dutch resistance, where many Gayonese and Dutch were killed, the Dutch occupied the area during 1904–1942. During this time, the Gayonese developed a thriving cash crop economy in vegetables and coffee. Since the Dutch colonization, the Gayonese have gained access to higher levels of education, and participated to some degree in the Islamization and modernization of their homeland.

== Surnames ==
Although it is not the practice of majority of Gayo society to have their surnames included, however there are a small group of them that still have their surnames attached to their given name especially those that are from Bebesen region. The purpose of the surname is only for them be identify and to be able to trace the individual's family lineage, thus it is not regarded as of great importance for the Gayo people.

== Culture ==
=== Religion ===
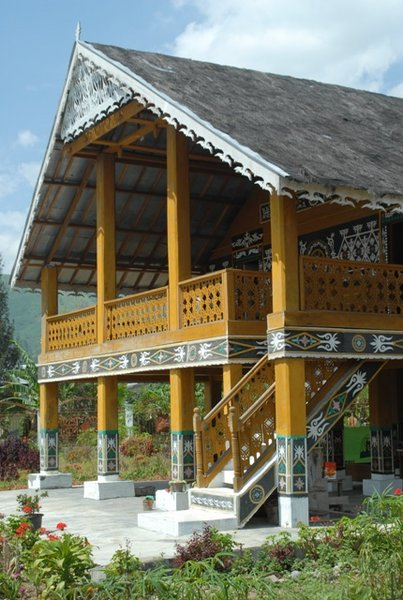
Gayo traditional house called Pitu Ruang (seven rooms)

The Gayonese are Sunni Muslims but practise a local form of Islam. Traces of ancient pre-Islamic traditions are still extant. In ancient times, the Gayonese believed in good and bad spirits and in holy men, both dead and alive. They would regularly give ritual offerings and sacrifices to the spirits, to holy men, and to their ancestors.

Conversion to Islam among the Gayo took multiple routes. According to local traditions, the Gayo attribute their conversion to the missionary activities of a Acehnese religious scholar during the early 17th century. From West Sumatra, Muslim merchants spread the religion to the highlands. From Aceh, the Aceh Sultanate expanded their influence to the region which also contributed to the eventual conversion of the Gayo.

=== Traditional dance and arts ===
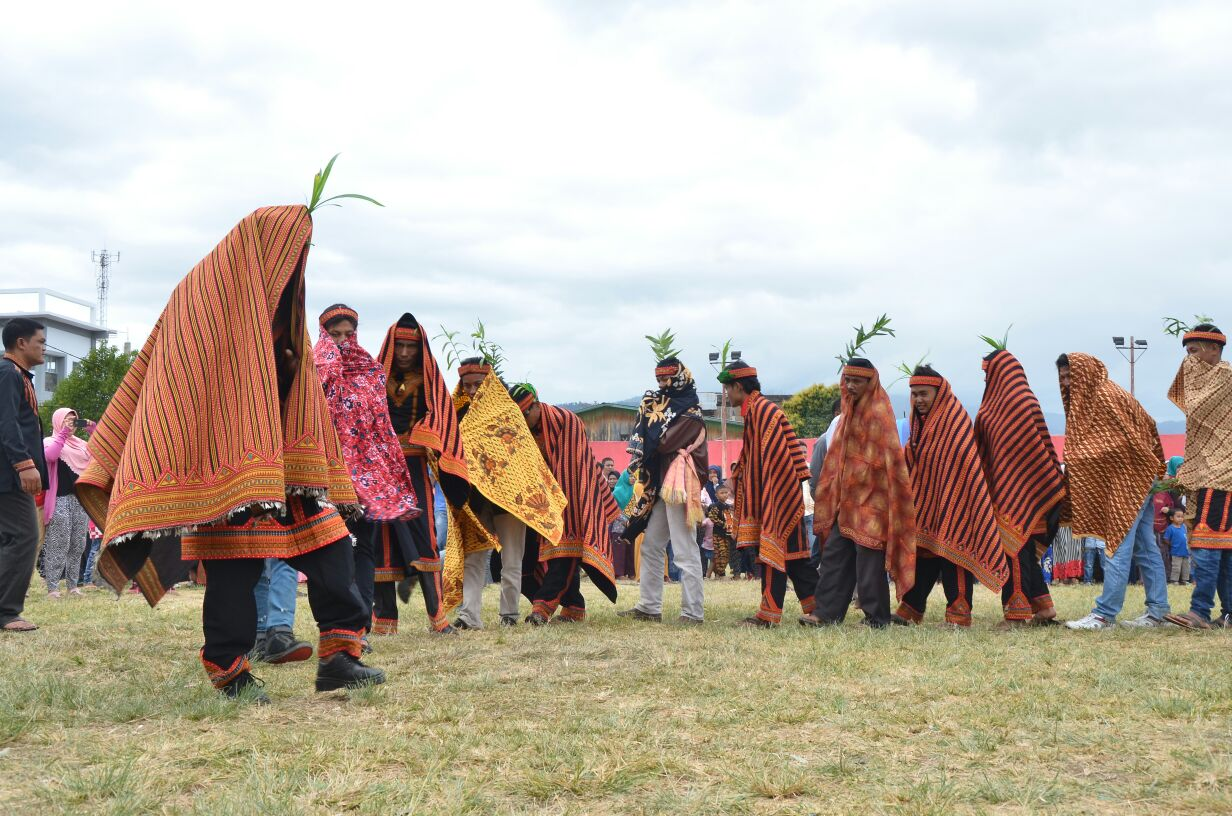
A Didong Nalo performance by the Gayo people

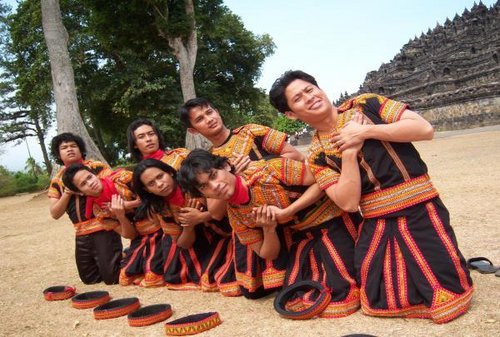
Saman dance performed by Gayonese men.

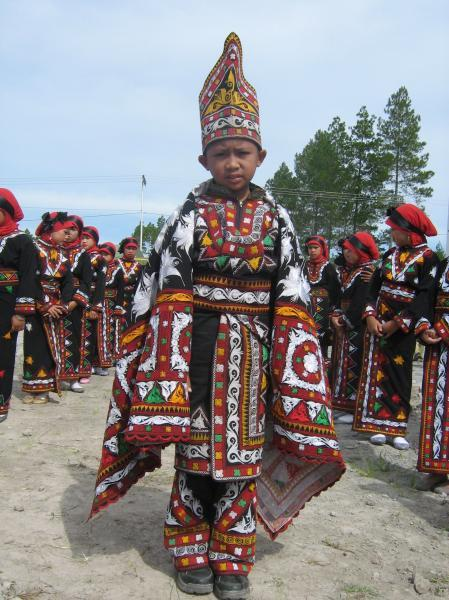
Guel dance.

- Didong
- Didong Alo
- Didong Sesuk
- Didong Niet
- Saman dance
- Bines dance
- Guel dance
- Munalo dance
- Sining dance
- Turun ku Aih Aunen dance
- Resam Berume dance
- Tuah Kukur
- Melengkan
- Dabus

=== Traditional cuisine ===
- Masam Jaeng
- Gutel
- Lepat
- Pulut Bekuah
- Cecah
- Pengat
- Gegaloh
- Gelame
- Duekali
- Dedah

=== Traditional cloth ===
- Upuh Ulen-Ulen
