= Lesik Kati Ara =

Indonesian writer

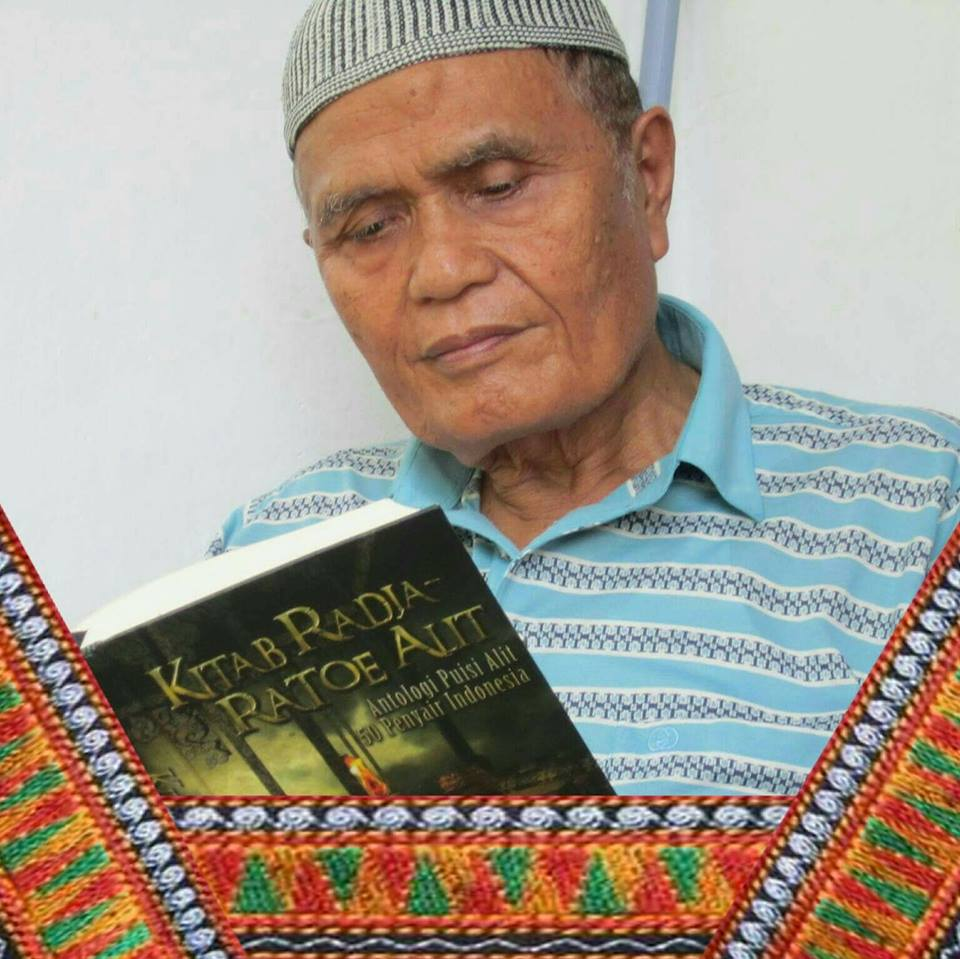
- Lesik Kati Ara. Jakarta, 2017
- Born: Lesik Kati Ara; November 12, 1937; Takengon, Aceh
- Citizenship: Indonesian
- Education: University of North Sumatra
- Occupation: poet
- Spouse: Ine Hidayah
- Writing career
- Pen name: LK Ara
- Language: Indonesian

Lesik Kati Ara (born November 12, 1937, Takengon, Aceh), better known as LK Ara, is an Indonesian poet.

== Brief biography and creativity ==
Ara graduated from the secondary school of the Taman Siswa (literally "Garden of Students" or "Students' Garden") system in Takengon and the Department of Journalism Studies at the University of North Sumatra. He worked a teacher in Jakarta from 1959 to 1962, in the office of the Prime Minister in 1962 and 1963, and from 1962 to 1985 at the Balai Pustaka publishing house, as a correspondent of several newspapers in Medan. He also collected folklore.

He is the author of 35 poetry collections (first in 1969), compiler of two anthologies of poems by Aceh poets (1995, 2003).

In his poems, along with a description of the nature of his native place, a great attention is given to the difficult life of peasants, especially of collectors of the coffee beans which is a local speciality of the area. He often recites his poems at the various meetings of poets both at home and in other countries (Singapore, Malaysia, Brunei). April 6, 2018, he participated in the meeting of the President of Indonesia Joko Widodo with a group of Indonesian writers in the State Palace in Jakarta.

== Awards ==
- Prize of the Government of Aceh (2009)

== Family ==
Ara's father is H. Harun Rashid, his mother is H. Siti Maryam, and his spouse is Ine Hidayah.
