= Aceh War =

1873–1904 Dutch colonial war in Aceh Sultanate

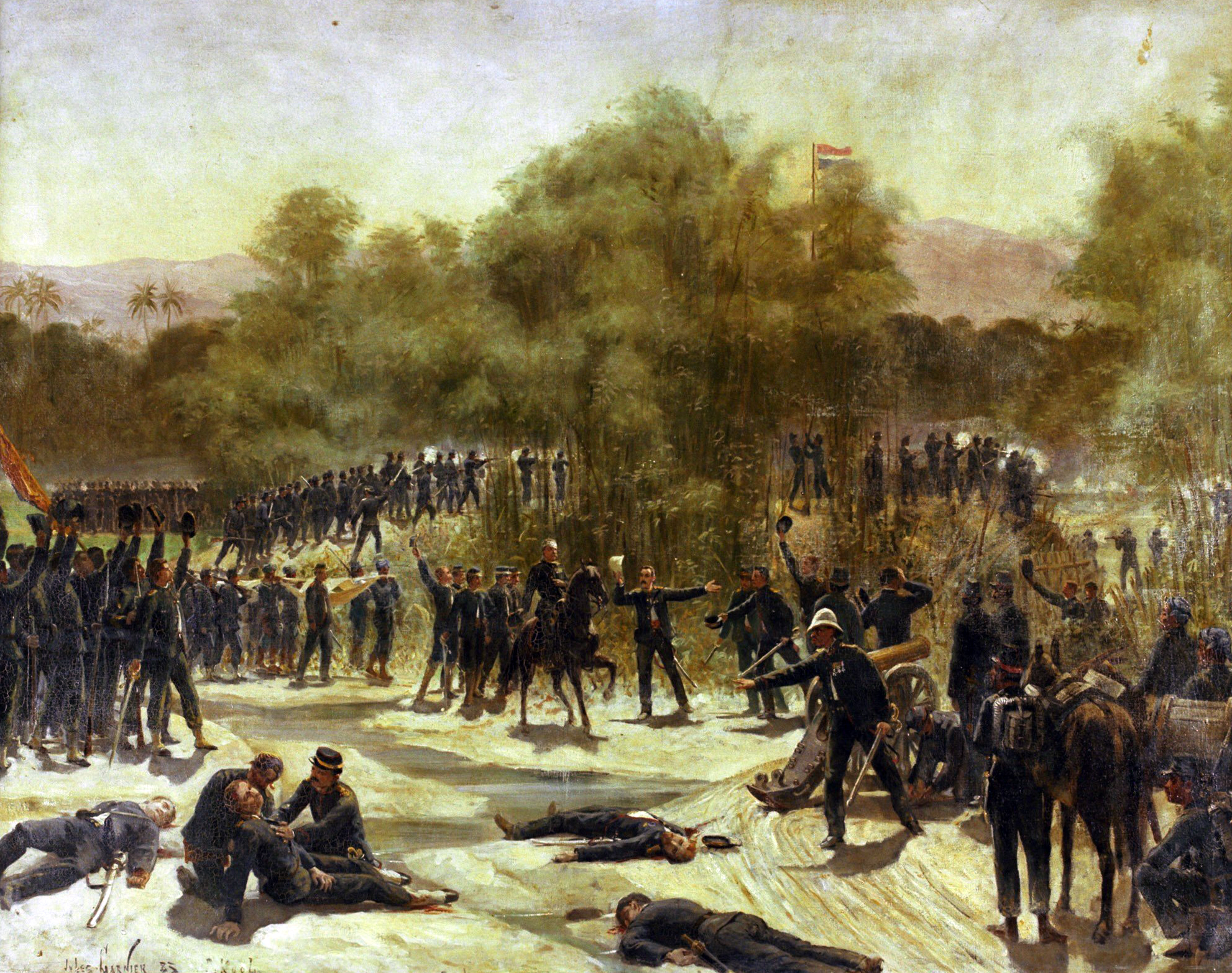
- Drawing of the Battle of Samalanga in Aceh
Date	1873–1904
Location	Aceh Sultanate (present day Aceh, Indonesia)
Result	Dutch victory; Imposition of Dutch rule over Aceh
Territorial changes	Dissolution of Aceh Sultanate; Aceh was annexed into the Dutch East Indies

Belligerents
Kingdom of the Netherlands; Dutch East Indies; Royal Netherlands East Indies Army; Korps Marechaussee te voet; Royal Netherlands Navy	Aceh Sultanate; Islamic ulama

Commanders and leaders
J.H.R. Köhler †; Jan van Swieten; J.L.J.H Pel †; K. van der Heijden (WIA); H. Demmeni (DOW); J.J.K. De Moulin †; J.B. van Heutsz; J.C. van der Wijck; Gotfried van Daalen; George Frederik Willem Borel	Sultan Mahmud Syah # Alauddin Muhammad Da'ud Syah II (surrendered); Tuanku Hasyim Banta Muda; Teuku Umar †; Cut Nyak Dhien; Teungku Chik di Tiro X Cut Nyak Meutia †; Panglima Polem (surrendered); Teungku Fakinah (surrendered)

Strength
3,000 troops (First Aceh Expedition); 13,000 (Second Aceh Expedition); 12,000 European KNIL troops (1903); 23,000 Indonesian KNIL troops	10,000–100,000 troops

Casualties and losses
37,000 killed (2,200 European) (including by cholera)	60,000–70,000 fighter and civilians killed (including by cholera); 10,000 refugees

The Aceh War (Indonesian: Perang Aceh; Acehnese: Prang Acèh; 1873–1904), was an armed military conflict between the Sultanate of Aceh and the Kingdom of the Netherlands which was triggered by discussions between representatives of Aceh and the United States in Singapore during early 1873. The war was part of a series of conflicts in the late 19th century that consolidated Dutch rule over modern-day Indonesia.

The campaign drew controversy in the Netherlands and Aceh as photographs and accounts of the death toll were reported. In 1904, the Sultanate of Aceh surrendered, though guerilla resistance would continue for some time after.

== Background ==
For much of the 19th century, Aceh's independence had been guaranteed by the Anglo-Dutch Treaty of 1824. During the 1820s, Aceh became a regional political and commercial power, supplying half of the world's pepper, which increased the revenues and influence of local feudal rajas. Growing European and American demand for pepper led to a series of diplomatic skirmishes between the British, French and Americans. During the reign of Sultan Alauddin Ibrahim Mansur Syah (1838–1870), the Aceh Sultanate brought the regional rajas under its control and extended its domain over the east coast. However, this southward trend clashed with the northwards expansion of Dutch colonialism in Sumatra.

Following the 1869 opening of the Suez Canal and changing shipping routes, the British and Dutch signed the 1871 Anglo-Dutch Treaty of Sumatra which ended British territorial claims to Sumatra, allowing the Dutch a free hand within their sphere of influence in Maritime Southeast Asia while handing them the responsibility to check piracy. In return, Britain gained control of the Dutch Gold Coast in Africa and equal commercial rights in Siak. Dutch territorial ambitions in Aceh were fuelled by a desire to exploit its natural resources, especially black pepper and oil, and to eliminate an independent native state player. The Dutch also sought to ward off rival colonial powers that had ambitions in Southeast Asia, particularly the British and the French.

== Combat operations ==
=== Strategies ===
The Dutch tried several strategies over the course of the war; single rapid attacks in 1873 failed, which then led them to pursue a naval blockade, reconciliation efforts, concentration within a line of forts, and finally passive containment. This all had scant success. The operations costs were 15 to 20 million guilders a year, which nearly bankrupted the colonial government.

=== First Dutch offensive ===
In 1873, negotiations took place in Singapore between representatives of the Aceh Sultanate and the local American Consul over a potential bilateral treaty. The Dutch saw this as a violation of a prior agreement with the British in 1871 and used this as an opportunity to annex Aceh militarily. An expedition under Major General Johan Harmen Rudolf Köhler was sent out on 26 March 1873, which bombarded the capital Banda Aceh and was able to occupy most of the coastal areas by April. It was the intention of the Dutch to attack and take the Sultan's palace, which would also lead to the occupation of the entire country. The Sultan requested and possibly received military aid from Italy and the United Kingdom in Singapore. In any case the Aceh army was rapidly modernised and enlarged with figures ranging from 10,000 to 100,000. Underestimating the military abilities of the Acehnese, the Dutch made some tactical errors and sustained losses including the deaths of Köhler and 80 troops. These defeats undermined Dutch morale and prestige.

After deciding to retreat, the Dutch imposed a naval blockade of Aceh. In an attempt to preserve Aceh's independence, Sultan Mahmud appealed to the other Western powers and the Ottoman Empire for direct help but to little avail. While the American Consul was sympathetic, the American government remained neutral. Due to its weak position in the international political stage, the Ottoman Empire was impotent and the British refused to intervene due to their relations with the Dutch. Only the French agreed to respond to Mahmud's appeal.

=== Second Dutch offensive ===
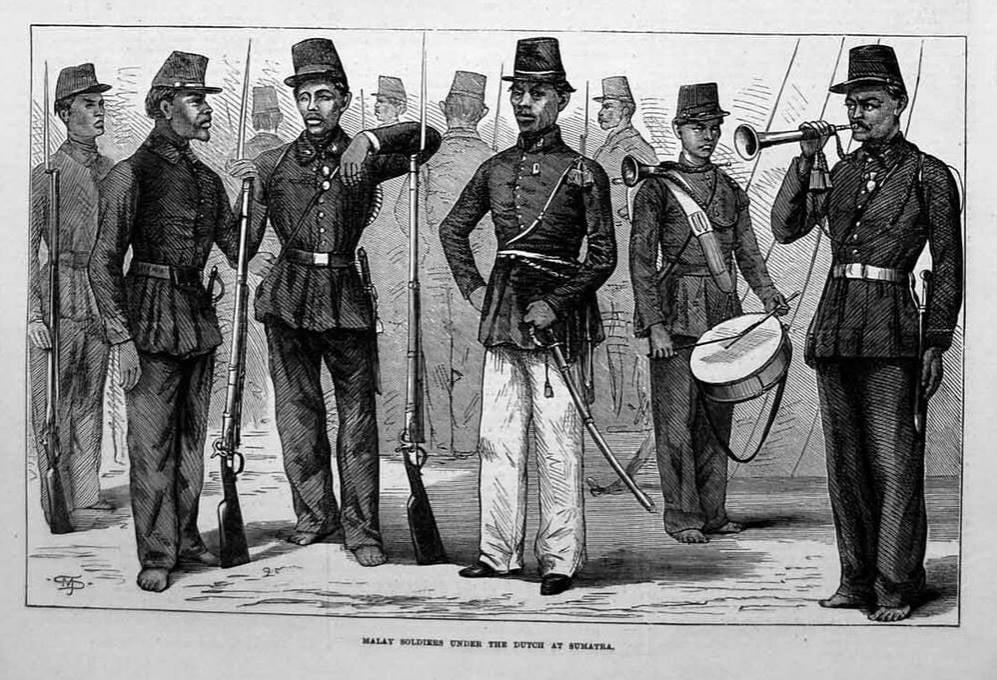
Malay soldiers under the Dutch command in Sumatra.

In November 1873, a second expedition consisting of 8,500 troops, 4,300 servants and coolies, and another reserve of 1,500 troops was added by General Jan van Swieten to be dispatched to Aceh. The invasion coincided with a cholera outbreak which killed thousands on both sides, the Dutch losing 150 every month while besieged in Banda Aceh. By January 1874, deteriorating conditions forced Sultan Mahmud Syah and his followers to abandon Banda Aceh and retreat to the interior. Meanwhile, Dutch forces occupied the capital and captured the symbolically important dalam (sultan's palace), leading the Dutch to believe that they had won. The Dutch occupiers then abolished the Acehnese Sultanate and declared Aceh to be annexed to the Dutch East Indies proper.

Following Mahmud's death from cholera, the Acehnese proclaimed a young grandson of Alauddin Ibrahim Mansur Syah, named Tuanku Muhammad Daud, as Alauddin Muhammad Da'ud Syah II (r. 1875–1903) and continued their struggle in the hills and jungle territory for ten years, with heavy casualties on both sides. Around 1880 the Dutch strategy changed, and rather than continuing the war, they now concentrated on defending areas they already controlled, which were mostly limited to the capital city, and the harbour town of Ulee Lheue. Dutch naval blockades succeeded in forcing the uleebelang or secular chiefs to sign treaties that extended Dutch control along the coastal regions. However, the uleebelang then used their newly restored revenues to finance the Acehnese resistance forces. By 1881, the Dutch had unilaterally declared the war over.

The Dutch intervention in Aceh cost the lives of thousands of troops and was a severe drain on the colonial government's financial expenditure. On 13 October 1880 the colonial government declared the war was over and installed a civilian government, but continued spending heavily to maintain control over the areas it occupied. In an attempt to win the support of the local Acehnese, the Dutch rebuilt the Masjid Raya Baiturrahman or Great Mosque in Banda Aceh as a gesture of reconciliation.

=== Holy war ===
War began again in 1883, when the British ship Nisero was stranded in Aceh, in an area where the Dutch had little influence. A local leader asked for ransom from both the Dutch and the British, and under British pressure the Dutch were forced to attempt to liberate the sailors. After a failed Dutch attempt to rescue the hostages, where the local leader Teuku Umar was asked for help but he refused, the Dutch together with the British invaded the territory. The Sultan gave up the hostages, and received a large amount of cash in exchange.

The Dutch Minister of War August Willem Philip Weitzel again declared open war on Aceh, and warfare continued with little success, as before. Facing a technologically superior foe, the Acehnese resorted to guerrilla warfare, particularly traps and ambushes. Dutch troops retaliated by wiping out entire villages and murdering both prisoners and civilians. By the mid-1880s, the costs of the war borne by the Dutch was so large that part of the colonial budget had to be shifted, local taxes were increased and a Dutch retrenchment was ordered which had the effect of much of the countryside being retaken by the Acehnese. In 1884, the Dutch responded by withdrawing all their forces in Aceh into a fortified line around Banda Aceh. The Dutch now also tried to enlist local leaders: the aforementioned Umar was bought with cash, opium, and weapons. Umar received the title panglima prang besar (lit. 'great war commander'). However, Umar instead called himself Teuku Djohan Pahlawan (lit. 'Johan the Heroic').

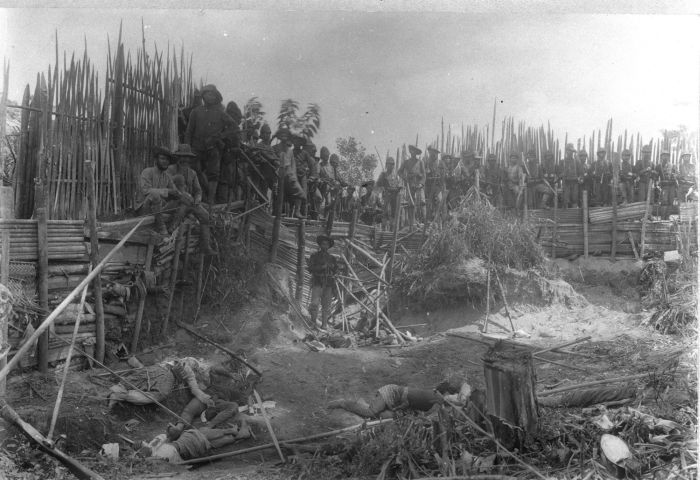
Capture of Fort Kuta Reh in Alasland on 14 June 1904, caused several hundred casualties to indigenous people, photo by H.M. Neeb.

On 1 January 1894 Umar even received Dutch aid to build an army. However, two years later Umar attacked the Dutch with his new army, rather than aiding the Dutch in subjugating inner Aceh. This is recorded in Dutch history as "Het verraad van Teukoe Oemar" (The Treason of Teuku Umar). From the mid-1880s, the Acehnese military leadership was dominated by religious ulema, including Teungku Chik di Tiro (Muhammad Saman), who propagated the concept of a "holy war" (prang sabi in Acehnese) through sermons and texts known as hikayat or poetic tales. Acehnese fighters viewed themselves as religious martyrs fighting "infidel invaders". By this stage, the Aceh War was being used as a symbol of Muslim resistance to Western imperialism.

In 1892 and 1893 Aceh remained independent, despite the Dutch efforts. Major J. B. van Heutsz, a colonial military leader, then wrote a series of articles on Aceh. He was supported by Dr. Christiaan Snouck Hurgronje of Leiden University, then the leading Dutch expert on Islam. Hurgronje managed to get the confidence of many Aceh leaders and gathered valuable intelligence for the Dutch government on the activities of Indonesian Hajj pilgrims. His works remained an official secret for many years. In Hurgronje's analysis of Acehnese society, he minimised the role of the Sultan and argued that attention should be paid to the hereditary chiefs and nobles, the Ulee Balang, who he felt could be trusted as local administrators. However, he argued, Aceh's religious leaders, the ulema, could not be trusted or persuaded to co-operate, and must be destroyed. As part of a policy of divide-and-conquer, Hurgronje urged the Dutch leadership to widen the existing gulf between the Acehnese nobility and the religious leaders.

Hurgronje was a friend of the Arab Grand Mufti of Batavia, Habib Usman bin Yahya, who issued a fatwa to support the Dutch war against Aceh.

In 1894, the penghulu or judge Hasan Mustafa also helped bring a stop to the fighting by issuing a fatwa, telling the Muslims to submit to the Dutch colonial government.

=== Pacification ===
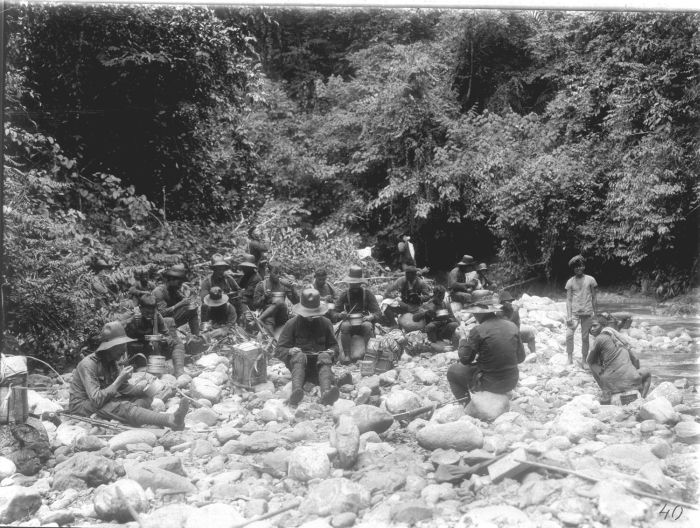
A Dutch military patrol on break during the Aceh War, photo by H.M. Neeb

In 1898, Van Heutsz was proclaimed governor of Aceh, and with his lieutenant, later Dutch Prime Minister Hendrikus Colijn, would finally conquer most of Aceh. They followed Hurgronje's suggestions, finding cooperative uleebelang that would support them in the countryside and isolating the resistance from their rural support base. The Dutch formulated a new strategy of counter-insurgency warfare by deploying light-armed Marechaussee units and using scorched earth tactics. Van Heutsz charged Colonel Gotfried Coenraad Ernst van Daalen with breaking remaining resistance.

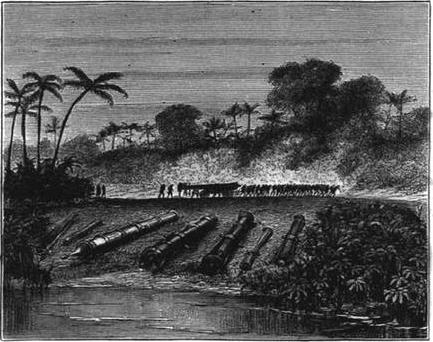
Dismantled Ottoman and Acehnese guns following the Dutch conquest of Aceh in 1874. Illustrated London News

In 1903, the main secular Acehnese resistance leaders including Sultan Alauddin Muhammad Da'ud Syah II, Tuanku Raja Keumala, Mahmud, and Muda Perkasa capitulated. During the 1904 campaign, Colonel van Daalen destroyed several villages, killing at least 2,922 Acehnese, among which were 1,149 women and children during the 1904 campaign. Dutch losses numbered 26, and van Daalen was promoted. Episodes of marked Dutch military cruelty occurred during this period. Photographs of a June 1904 Dutch massacre in Kuta Reh village of the Alas people taken during the Dutch military expedition in Aceh, Gayo, and Alas regions, for example, indicate that killings of large groups of civilians occurred on some occasions. By the end of 1904, most of Aceh was under Dutch control, and had an indigenous government that cooperated with the colonial state. The Dutch consolidated their control over Aceh by practising a policy of religious tolerance as a means of dissuading the Acehnese from taking up an armed struggle. According to Historian Adrian Vickers, during the entire Aceh war, 50,000 to 60,000 Acehnese died from violence and disease, approximately 2,000 European and allied indigenous soldiers were killed in combat, and more than 35,000 soldiers and labourers died from disease. The destruction of entire communities also caused 10,000 Acehnese to flee to neighbouring Malaya.

Colijn wrote a letter to his wife detailing the atrocities of the conflict:

I have seen a mother carrying a child of about 6 months old on her left arm, with a long lance in her right hand, who was running in our direction. One of our bullets killed the mother as well as the child. From now on we couldn't give any mercy, it was over. I did give orders to gather a group of 9 women and 3 children who asked for mercy and they were shot all together. It was not a pleasant job, but something else was impossible. Our soldiers tacked them with pleasure with their bayonets. It was horrible. I will stop reporting now.

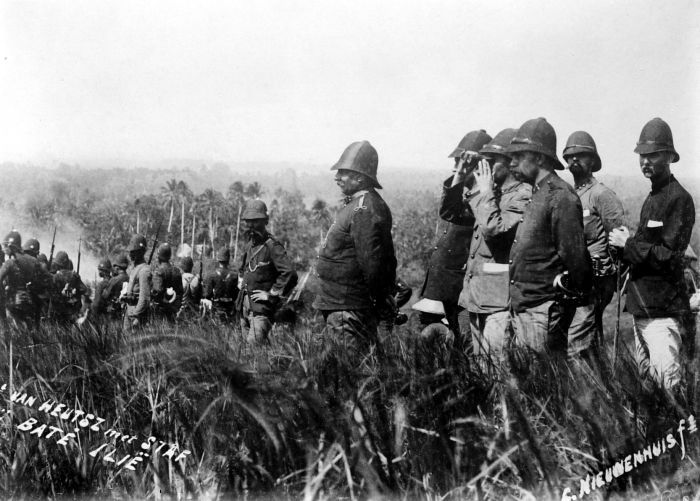
General van Heutz and staff in a photograph by Christiaan Benjamin Nieuwenhuis

In the Netherlands at the time, van Heutsz was considered a hero, named the 'Pacifier of Aceh' and was promoted to become governor-general of the entire Dutch Indies in 1904. A still-existent monument to him was erected in Amsterdam, though his image and name were later removed, to protest his violent legacy. The Dutch establishment defended its actions in Aceh by citing a moral imperative to liberate the masses from the oppression and backward practices of independent native rulers that did not meet accepted international norms. The Aceh War also encouraged Dutch annexation of other independent states in Bali, Moluccas, Borneo and Sulawesi between 1901 and 1910.

Colonial influence in the remote highland areas of Aceh was never substantial, however, and limited guerrilla resistance led by religious ulema persisted until 1942. Unable to dislodge the Dutch, many of the ulema gradually discontinued their resistance. The region of Gayo remained a centre of resistance as late as 1914. One intellectual Sayyid Ahmad Khan advocated discontinuing the "jihad" against the Dutch.

=== Suicide attacks ===
Muslim Acehnese from the Aceh Sultanate performed "holy war" known as Parang-sabil against invaders such as on the Americans in the attack on Joseph Peabody's ship Friendship, during the First Sumatran expedition and the Second Sumatran expedition, and against the Dutch in the Dutch expedition on the west coast of Sumatra and most notably during the Aceh War, where they performed suicide attacks as part of "parang sabil". It was considered as part of personal jihad in the Islamic religion of the Acehnese. The Dutch called it Atjèh-moord, (Acehmord, Aceh mord, Aceh-mord, Aceh Pungo). The Acehnese work of literature, the Hikayat Perang Sabil provided the background and reasoning for the "Aceh-mord" – Acehnese suicide attacks upon the Dutch. The Indonesian translations of the Dutch terms are Aceh bodoh (Aceh pungo) or Aceh gila (Aceh mord).

The original Acehnese language work Hikayat Prang Sabi (see also: id:Hikayat Prang Sabi) written with the Jawi script has been transliterated into the Latin alphabet and annotated by Ibrahim Alfian which was published in Jakarta. Perang sabi was the Acehnese word for jihad, a holy war and Acehnese language literary works on perang sabi were distributed by Islamic clerics (ulama) such as Teungku di Tiro to help the resistance against the Dutch in the Aceh War. The recompense awarded by the fighters in paradise (detailed in Arabic texts) and mentions of Dutch atrocities were expounded on in the Hikayat Perang Sabil which was communally read by small cabals of ulama and Acehnese who swore an oath before going to achieve the desired status of "martyr" by launching suicide attacks on the Dutch. Perang sabil was the Malay equivalent to other terms like Jihad, Ghazawat for "Holy war".

Fiction novels like Sayf Muhammad Isa's Sabil: Prahara di Bumi Rencong on the war by Aceh against the Dutch include references to Hikayat Perang Sabil. Mualimbunsu Syam Muhammad wrote the work titled "Motives for Perang Sabil in Nusantara" (Motivasi perang sabil di Nusantara: kajian kitab Ramalan Joyoboyo, Dalailul-Khairat, dan Hikayat Perang Sabil) on Indonesia's history of Islamic holy war. Children and women were inspired to engage in suicide attacks by the Hikayat Perang Sabil against the Dutch. The hikayat is considered as an important part of 19th century Malay literature. In Dutch-occupied Aceh, the hikayat was confiscated from Sabi's house during a police raid on 27 September 1917.

Dutch soldiers were attacked with blades wielded by Acehnese fighters on their feet.

Atjèh-moord was also used against the Japanese by the Acehnese during the Japanese occupation of Aceh. The Acehnese Ulama (Islamic clerics) fought against both the Dutch and the Japanese, revolting against the Dutch in February 1942 and against Japan in November 1942. The revolt was led by the All-Aceh Religious Scholars' Association (PUSA). The Japanese suffered 18 dead in the uprising while they slaughtered up to 100 or over 120 Acehnese. The revolt happened in Bayu and was centred around Tjot Plieng village's religious school. During the revolt, the Japanese troops armed with mortars and machine guns were charged by sword wielding Acehnese under Teungku Abduldjalil (Tengku Abdul Djalil) in Buloh Gampong Teungah and Tjot Plieng on 10 and 13 November. In May 1945 the Acehnese rebelled again.

== Aftermath ==
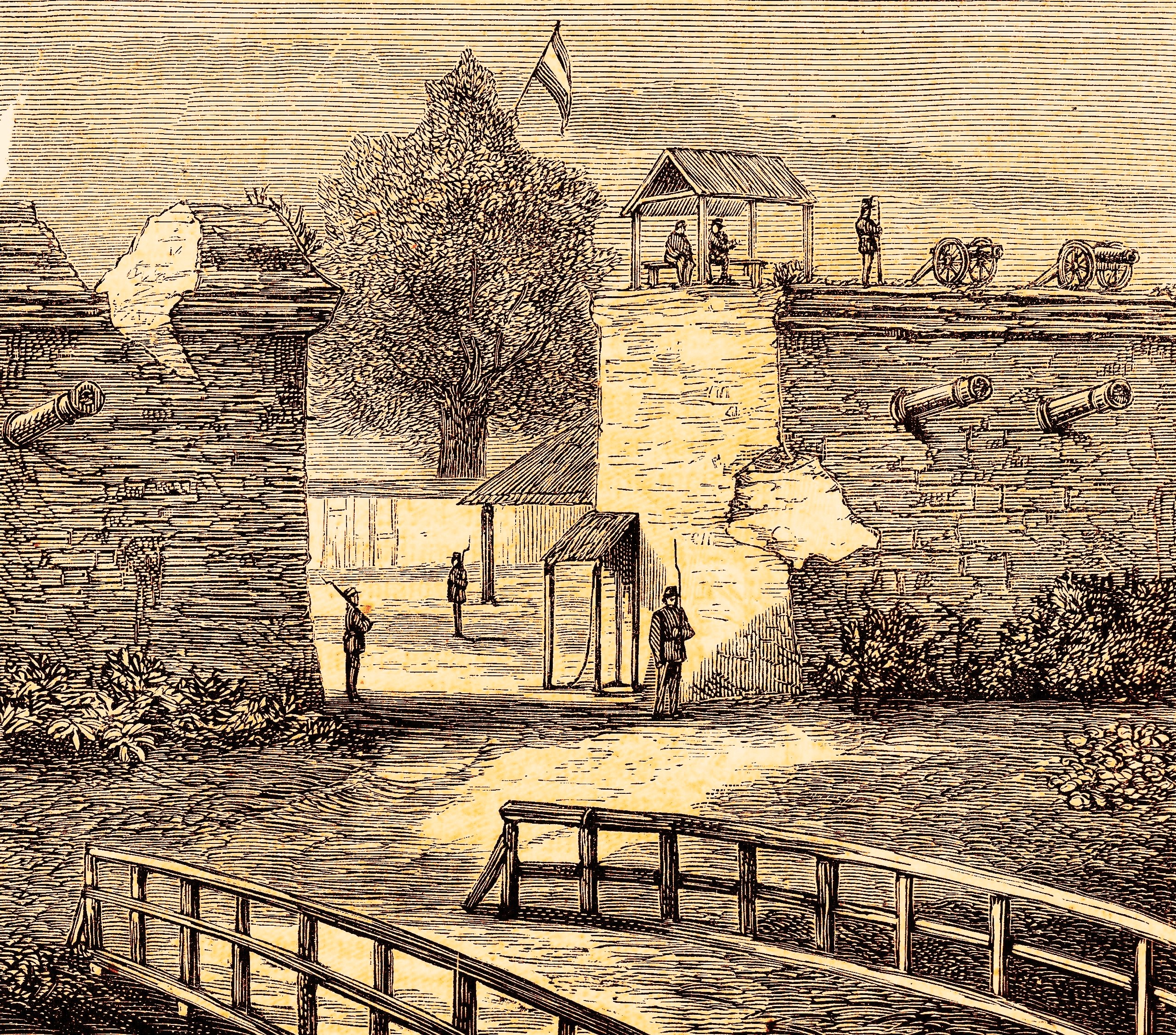
Kraton of Aceh after Dutch occupation, 1874.

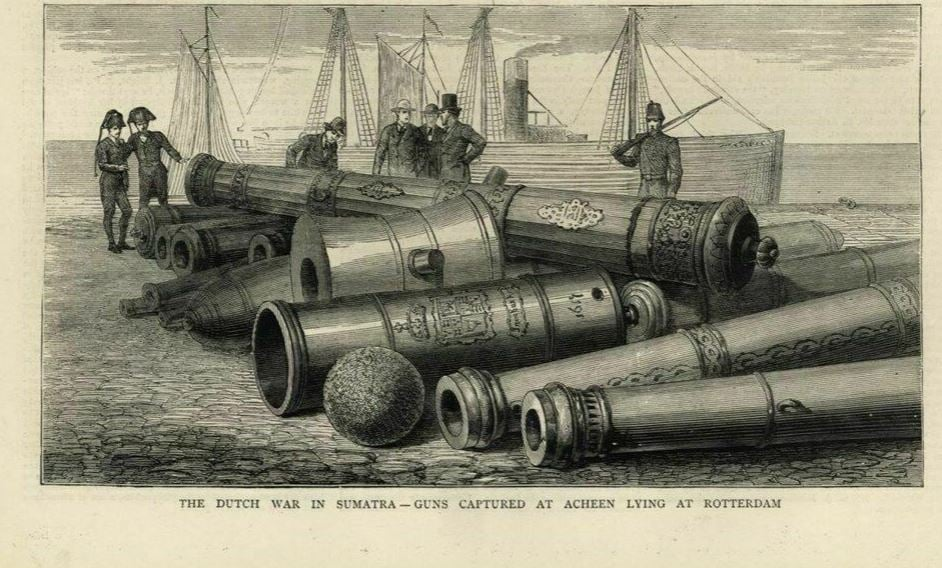
The results of the Sultanate's cannon looting after the Dutch fought in Sumatra

Following the Aceh War, local uleebelang (aristocracy) assisted the Dutch in maintaining control over Aceh through indirect rule. Despite the end of open conflict, popular Acehnese resistance against Dutch rule continued until the Japanese invasion of the Dutch East Indies in 1942. Throughout the early 20th century, Dutch citizens and personnel were targeted by sporadic suicide attacks by the Acehnese who were influenced by the Hikayat Perang Sabil and other proscribed texts. This phenomenon was known as the Atjeh-moord or "Aceh murders" and forced the Dutch government to maintain substantial forces within the province. During the early 20th century, Standard Oil and Royal Dutch Shell developed oil refineries to profit from the province's substantial oil reserves.

Acehnese resentment was further stoked by a system of forced corvee labour where subjects were required to work on government roadwork projects for 24 days a year. By the mid-1920s, Aceh had reverted to a state of full-scale guerrilla warfare. Following the Japanese invasion, the occupying Japanese forces were initially welcomed by Acehnese nationalists as liberators though differences led to protracted resistance by Islamic-inspired rebels, culminating in a rebellion at Bayu.

The Acehnese ulama (Islamic clerics) fought against both the Dutch and the Japanese, revolting against the Dutch in February 1942 and against Japan in November 1942. The revolt was led by the Pan-Aceh Religious Scholars' Association (PUSA). The Japanese suffered 18 dead in the uprising while they slaughtered up to 100–120 Acehnese. The revolt happened in Bayu and was centred around Tjot Plieng village's religious school. During the revolt, the Japanese troops armed with mortars and machine guns were charged by sword wielding Acehnese under Teungku Abduldjalil (Tengku Abdul Djalil) in Buloh Gampong Teungah and Tjot Plieng on 10 and 13 November. In May 1945 the Acehnese rebelled again. During the Indonesian National Revolution following the Japanese surrender in August 1945, the aristocracy were targeted for retribution due to their collaboration with the Dutch and the region became a stronghold for Sukarno's Republicans. Due to the entrenched anti-colonial sentiment, the Dutch bypassed Aceh during their Police Actions from 1947 to 1948.

Following the Dutch transfer of sovereignty to Indonesia in August 1949, many Acehnese became dissatisfied with the policies of the Javanese-dominated central government in Jakarta and began agitating for autonomy. Grievances included Aceh's incorporation into the predominantly Christian Batak province of North Sumatra, its poor financial and political rewards within the unitary Indonesian Republic and the failure to implement sharia law. In 1953, Sukarno stated that he opposed Aceh's plan to enact sharia law, stating that "Indonesia is a nation state with the ideology of Pancasila, not a theocratic country with a certain religious orientation." As told by Sajoeti, who also accompanied Sukarno, some of the Acehnese militant groups did not welcome Sukarno's visit and even suspected that he had a secularizing agenda. These factors led to a short-lived rebellion by the Darul Islam movement under Daud Bereueh which was suppressed by the Indonesian armed forces. Despite this, many Acehnese and other Sumatrans resented key government and military positions being dominated by Javanese. The resulting rebellion led by the Free Aceh Movement raged in the province until a peace treaty was signed between the Acehnese movement and the Indonesian government following the Great Aceh tsunami.

=== Dutch Kerkhof Poucut Cemetery ===
Numerous Dutch casualties of the Aceh War are buried in the Kerkhof Peucut Cemetery (also called Peutjoet or Peutjut Cemetery), the Dutch military cemetery is located near the centre of Banda Aceh next to the Aceh Tsunami Museum. The Kerkhoff Poucut is recorded as the largest Dutch military cemetery outside of the Netherlands. There are around 2,200 graves of Dutch soldiers as well as recruits from Ambon, Manado and Java, as well as several Dutch generals.

== See also ==
- Padri War
- Java War
