= Johan Cornelis van der Wijck =

Dutch lieutenant general of the Royal Netherlands East Indies Army

Jhr. Johan Cornelis van der Wijck
- Born: January 11, 1848; Buitenzorg, West Java
- Died: October 2, 1919 (aged 71); The Hague, South Holland
- Military career
- Allegiance: Royal Dutch East Indies Army
- Branch: Infantry
- Service years: 1865–1907
- Rank: Lieutenant general
- Commands: Governor of Aceh; Royal Dutch East Indies Army
- Aceh War: First Aceh Expedition

Jhr. Johan Cornelis van der Wijck (11 January 1848, in Buitenzorg – 2 October 1919, in The Hague) was a Dutch lieutenant general of the Royal Netherlands East Indies Army (KNIL) and governor of Aceh and related territories.

== Career ==
Van der Wijk was educated at Koninklijke Militaire Academie and in 1869 he was promoted to second lieutenant. In 1874 he was promoted to first lieutenant and became commander of the IIIrd military department. Van der Wijck became captain in 1888, major in 1892 and lieutenant colonel in 1894. In 1895 and 1898 he was military commander of Palembang and in 1880 he became commander of the infantry in Magelang. In 1898 he was promoted to colonel and in 1900 as major general he became commander first of the first and then of the second military department on Java. Then he became chief of the weapon of the infantry as well as chief of the second department of the Dutch war ministry in the Dutch East Indies.

After Van der Wijck temporarily became head of the KNIL in 1903 he was thanked by the government for the quality of his command. In 1904, during the absence of the civil and military governor of Aceh, Van Heutsz, Van der Wijck temporarily assumed his responsibilities. A year later he was honorarily discharged from the function. In 1905 he became lieutenant general, commander of the army and head of the Department of War in the Dutch East Indies. In the same year he became a member of the central committee of the Dutch East Indies Red Cross.

At his own request, Van der Wijck was honorably discharged from the army in 1907 and was thanked for his services to the country. He became a Knight of the Order of the Dutch Lion and received the Aceh Medal for his military achievements in the Kraton during the Aceh War. He also received the Expedition Cross. He was honorably mentioned for his military actions in the XII and XXVI Mukims in Aceh in 1879. He died on 2 October 1919 and was buried at the Algemene Begraafplaats (General Cemetery) in The Hague.

== Military decorations ==
- Knight of the Order of the Netherlands Lion
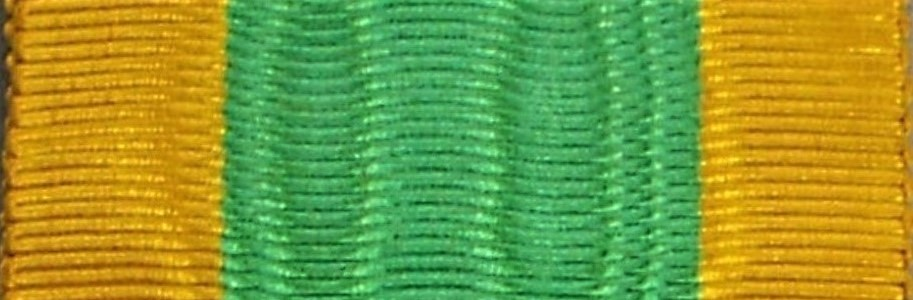
- Expedition Cross with clasps: "Honorable Mention", "Aceh 1876-96"
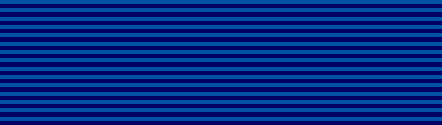
- Aceh Medal 1873–1874
- Medal for Long, Honest and Faithful Service with the figure XXXV
