= Theodoor Johan Arnold van Zijll de Jong =

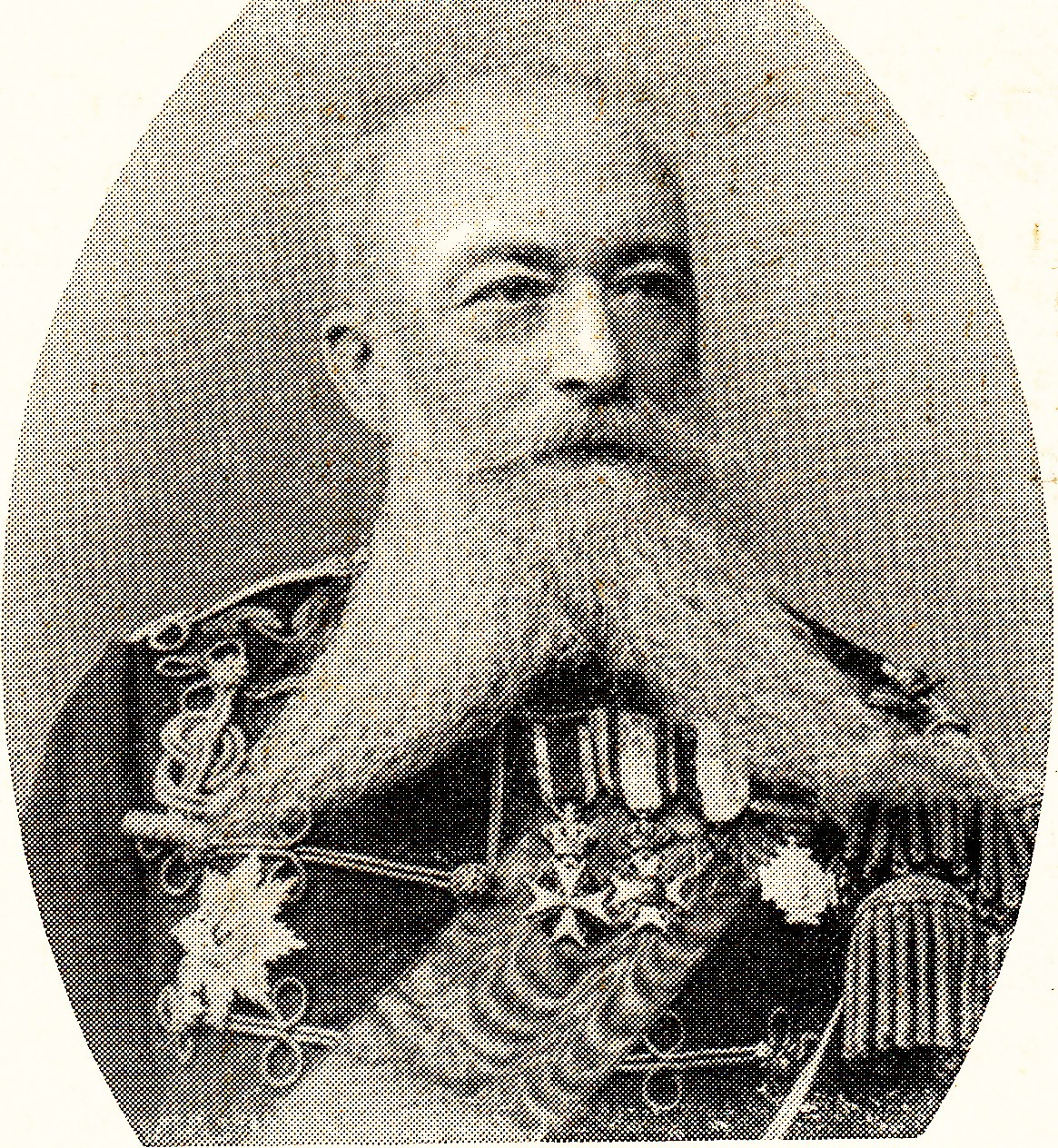
- Born: March 31, 1836; Velp, Gelderland
- Died: 28 May 1917 (aged 81); The Hague, South Holland
- Burial place: Algemene Begraafplaats Kerkhoflaan
- Military career
- Allegiance: Royal Netherlands East Indies Army
- Branch: Artillery
- Service years: 1851-1893
- Rank: Lieutenant general
- Commands: Royal Netherlands East Indies Army
- Conflicts: First Aceh Expedition; Fifth Bali expedition

'Theodoor Johan Arnold van Zijll de Jong (Velp, 31 March 1836 – The Hague, 28 May 1917) was a Dutch Lieutenant General and commander of the Royal Netherlands East Indies Army

== Awards and decorations ==
- Knight fourth class of the Military William Order (Royal Decree of 4 April 1875 no. 22)
- Knight of the Order of the Netherlands Lion
- Expedition Cross with clasps: "Honorary Sabre", "Honorable Mention", "Aceh 1873-96"
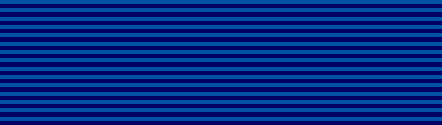
- Aceh Medal 1873–1874
- Medal for Long, Honest and Faithful Service with the figure XXXV
- Knight Grand Cross of the Order of St. Anna (Russia)

== Sources ==
- 1903. G. van Steijn. Gedenkboek Koninklijke Militaire Academie. P.B. Nieuwenhuijs. Breda.
- 1940. G.C.E. Köffler. De Militaire Willemsorde 1815–1940. Algemene Landsdrukkerij. Den Haag.
- 2009. George Frederik Willem Borel. Onze vestiging in Atjeh, drogredenen zijn geen waarheid. Uitgeverij Eburon. Delft. Heruitgave van 1878. Onze vestiging in Atjeh, critisch beschreven D.A. Thieme, Den Haag en 1880. Drogredenen zijn geen waarheid. Henri J. Stemberg, Den Haag.
