= Cut Nyak Dhien =

Acehnese guerrilla leader (1848–1908)

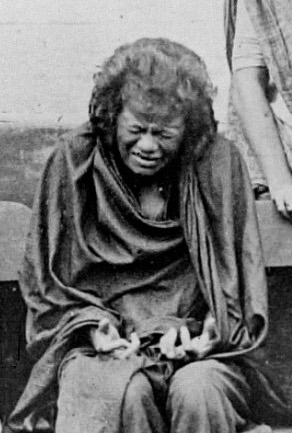
- Cut Nyak Dhien when arrested by the Dutch in 1905
- Born: c. 1848; Lampadang, Aceh Sultanate
- Died: 6 November 1908 (aged 59–60); Soemedang, Dutch East Indies
- Spouse(s): Ibrahim Lamnga, Teuku Umar
- Children: Cut Gambang
- Relatives: Teuku Nanta Seutia (father)
- Military career
- Allegiance: Aceh Sultanate
- Conflicts: Aceh War
- Awards: National Hero of Indonesia

Cut Nyak Dhien (VOSS: Tjoet Nja' Dhien; c. 1848–6 November 1908) was a leader of the Acehnese guerrilla forces during the Aceh War. Following the death of her husband Teuku Umar, she led guerrilla actions against the Dutch for 25 years. She was posthumously awarded the title of National Hero of Indonesia on 2 May 1964 by the Indonesian government. She was exiled to Sumedang, West Java, because the Dutch colonial government was terrified of her massive political and spiritual influence. Despite being far from her homeland of Aceh, the local Sundanese people did not know her real identity for a long time and revered her as "Ibu Perbu" (The Queen Mother) because of her profound knowledge of Islamic theology and Arabic.

== Early life ==
Cut Nyak Dhien was born into a Muslim aristocratic family in Aceh Besar in VI mukim district in 1848. Her father, Teuku Nanta Setia, was a member of the ruling Ulèë Balang aristocratic class in VI mukim, and her mother was also from an aristocrat family. She was educated in religion and household matters. She was renowned for her beauty, and many men proposed to her until her parents arranged for her marriage to Teuku Cek Ibrahim Lamnga, the son of an aristocratic family, when she was twelve.

== Aceh War ==
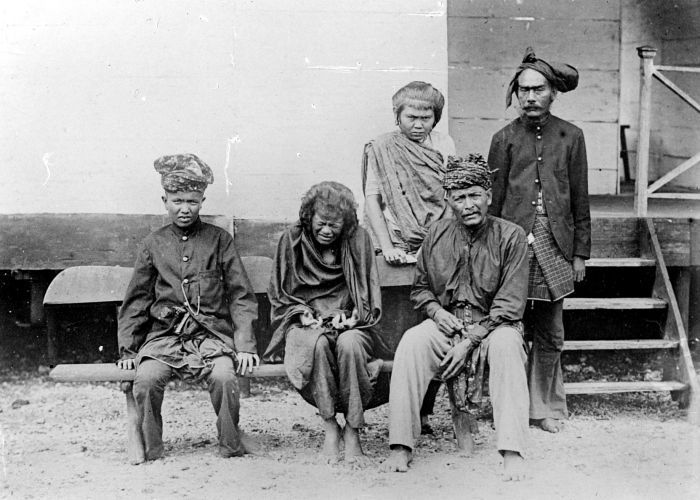
Cut Nyak Dhien after being captured by Dutch East Indies officials

On 26 March 1873, the Dutch declared war on Aceh, beginning the Aceh War. During the first part of this war, the First Aceh Expedition, Aceh was led by Panglima Polem and Sultan Alauddin Mahmud Syah II. The Dutch army sent 3,000 soldiers led by Johan Harmen Rudolf Köhler to take the Sultan's palace. The Sultan received military aid from the Kingdom of Italy and the United Kingdom, and the Aceh army was rapidly modernized and enlarged from 10,000 to 100,000 soldiers. Dutch forces were successfully pushed back, and Köhler died in action.

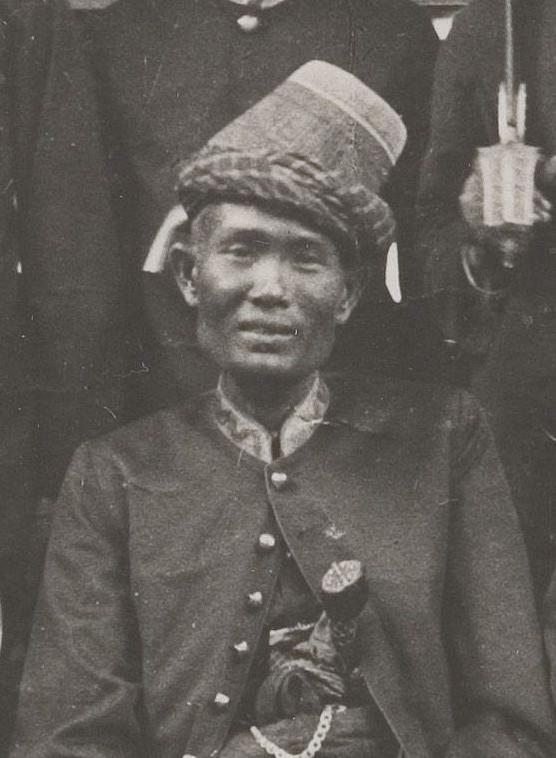
Teuku Umar, c. 1890

In November 1873, during the Second Aceh Expedition the Dutch successfully captured VI mukim in 1873, followed by the Sultan's Palace in 1874. In 1875, Cut Nyak Dhien and her baby, along with other mothers, were evacuated to a safer location while her husband Ibrahim Lamnga fought to reclaim VI mukim.

Teuku Ibrahim Lamnga died in action in Gle Tarum on 29 June 1878. Upon hearing this, Cut Nyak Dhien swore revenge against the Dutch.

Some time after the death of her husband, an Acehnese hero Teuku Umar proposed to her. Although she rejected him at first, she accepted his proposal when Umar allowed her to fight, and they were married in 1880. This greatly boosted the morale of Aceh armies in their fight against the Kaphé Blanda, or Dutch infidel. Teuku Umar and Cut Nyak Dhien had a daughter together named Cut Gambang. Dhien was very determined to stay in the war so took her daughter in with her.

The war continued, and the Acehnese declared a holy war against the Dutch, engaging in guerrilla warfare and attacking with traps and ambushes. Undersupplied, Teuku Umar surrendered to Dutch forces on 30 September 1893 along with 250 of his men. The Dutch army welcomed him and appointed him as a commander, giving him the title of Teuku Umar Johan Pahlawan, though he secretly planned to betray them. Two years later Teuku Umar set out to assault Aceh, but instead departed with his troops, heavy equipment, weapons, and ammunition, using these supplies to help the Acehnese. This is recorded in Dutch history as "Het verraad van Teukoe Oemar" (the treason of Teuku Umar).

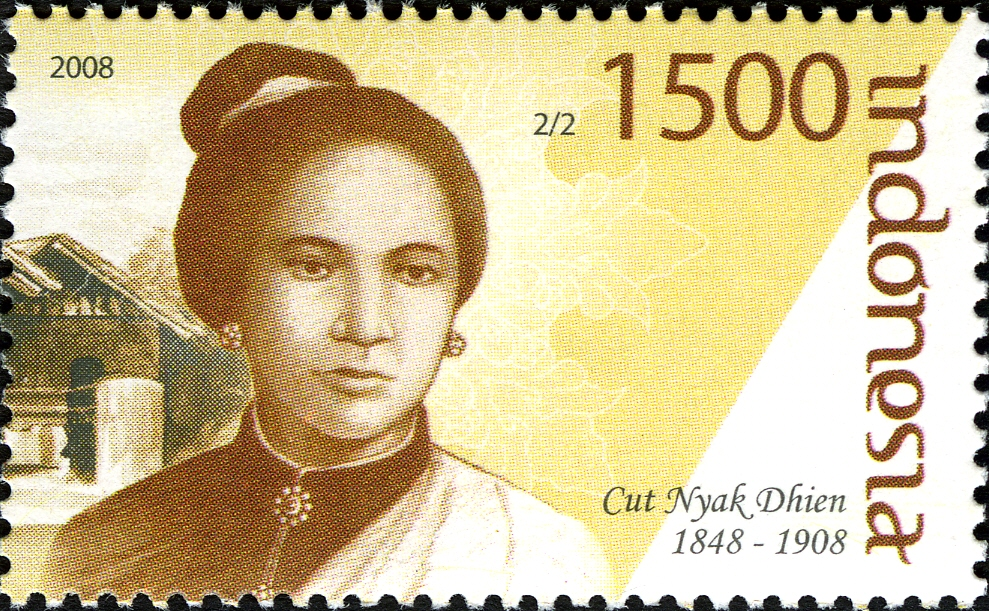
Stamp of Indonesia, 2008

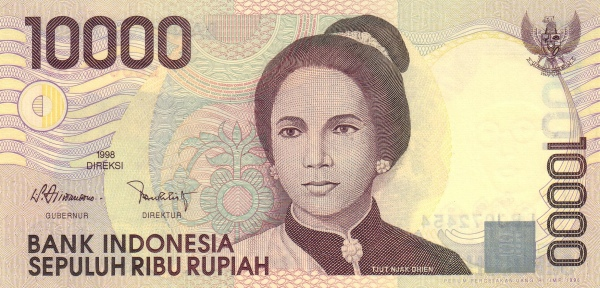
Cut Nyak Dhien featured on the 10,000-rupiah banknote.

Teuku Umar and Dhien kept resisting the Dutch with their new equipment until the Dutch sent the Maréchaussée. The Acehnese found these troops extremely difficult to resist and many people were killed.

The Dutch general Johannes Benedictus van Heutsz took advantage of the condition and sent a spy to Aceh. Teuku Umar was killed during battle when the Dutch launched a surprise attack on him in Meulaboh. When Cut Gambang cried over his death, Cut Nyak Dhien reportedly slapped her and then she hugged her and said: "As Acehnese women, we may not shed tears for those who have been martyred."

After her husband died, Cut Nyak Dhien continued to resist the Dutch with her small army until its destruction in 1901, as the Dutch adapted their tactics to the situation in Aceh. Furthermore, Cut Nyak Dhien suffered from nearsightedness and arthritis as she got older. The number of her troops kept decreasing and they suffered from a lack of supplies.

One of her men, Pang Laot, told the Dutch the location of her headquarters in Beutong Le Sageu. The Dutch assaulted, catching Dhien and her troops by surprise. Despite desperately fighting back, Dhien was captured, but her daughter Cut Gambang escaped and continued the resistance.

== Later life ==
Dhien was brought to Banda Aceh and her myopia and arthritis slowly healed. She was sent into exile to Sumedang, West Java because the Dutch were afraid she would mobilize the resistance of Aceh people. During her exile in Sumedang, she lived in a prominent cleric's house, Sanusi, where she taught the Quran to the women who lived nearby. She was known as a person who memorised the whole quran, hafizah that caused her to earn a nickname Ibu Perbu, Ibu Suci (Holy Mother), Ibu Ratu (Queen Mother). Since she refused to accept any assistances from the colonial government, the Regent of Sumedang, Soeria Atmadja covered her necessities.

== Legacy ==
On 2 May 1964 Dhien was posthumously proclaimed a National Hero by President Sukarno.

The film Tjoet Nja' Dhien written and directed by Eros Djarot was screened at the Selection de la Semaine de la Critique in Cannes, 1989.

The Cut Nyak Dhien Airport in Nagan Raya Regency, Aceh is named after her.

KRI Cut Nyak Dien, an Indonesian Navy corvette is named after her.

== Bibliography ==
- Reid, Anthony (2005). An Indonesian Frontier: Acehnese & Other Histories of Sumatra. Singapore: Singapore University Press. pp. 336, 352. ISBN 9971-69-298-8.
