= Ala al-Din Muhammad =

Ala al-Din Muhammad (علاء الدين محمد ʿAlāʾ al-Dīn Muhammad) may refer to:

- Muhammad II of Khwarazm, ruler of the Khwarezmian Empire from 1200 to 1220
- Muhammad III of Alamut, Nizari Isma'ili Imam
- Alauddin Muhammad Da'ud Syah II
- Alauddin Mahmud Syah II
