= Alauddin Muhammad Daud Syah II =

Sultan of Aceh

Alauddin Muhammad Da'ud Syah II
- Sultan of Aceh Sultanate
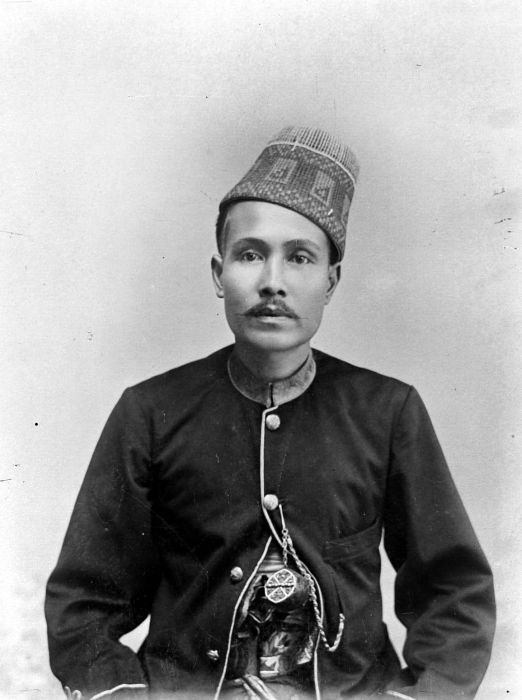

Sultan of Aceh
- Reign: 4 March 1875 – 10 January 1903
- Predecessor: Alauddin Mahmud Syah II
- Successor: Tuanku Raja Ibrahim (claimant), Sultanate abolished
- Grand vizier: Habib Abdurrahman az-Zahir; Tuanku Hasyim Banta Muda; Tuanku Mahmud Banta Keucik
- Born: c. 1864; Banda Aceh, Aceh Sultanate
- Died: February 6, 1939 (aged 75); Meester Cornelis, Batavia, Dutch East Indies
- Spouse: Empress Teungku Putroe Gambar Gading; Pocut Manyak Cot Murong; Teungku Jam Manikam binti Tuwanku Mahmud; Hajjah Neng Effi
- Issue: Tuanku Raja Ibrahim; 2 princesses
Names
- Alauddin Muhammad Da'ud Syah II ibni Sultan Mahmud Syah
- Father: Mahmud Syah
- Mother: Nyak Beulukeh
- Religion: Sunni Islam

Sultan Alauddin Muhammad Da'ud Syah II (1864 – 6 February 1939) was the thirty-fifth and last Sultan of Aceh in northern Sumatra. He reigned from 1875 to 1903. Despite long lasting resistance his rule ended up being conquered by the Dutch colonial state (Dutch East Indies).

== Colonial invasion ==
Tuanku Muhammad Da'ud was the son of Tuanku Zainul Abidin and the grandson of Sultan Alauddin Ibrahim Mansur Syah. When his father and grandfather died in rapid succession in 1870, the throne went to a prince from another branch, Alauddin Mahmud Syah II. This was a period of strong colonial expansion in Southeast Asia. Dutch fear of involvement by some other foreign power in northern Sumatra led them to pursue an aggressive policy vis-à-vis the hitherto independent Aceh, which resulted in the outbreak of the Aceh War on 26 March 1873. During the Second Aceh Expedition in 1873-74, the capital Kutaraja was occupied by the colonial troops. Alauddin Mahmud Syah was evacuated by his retainers but died of cholera on 28 January 1874. Three days later the commanding general Jan van Swieten abolished the Acehnese Sultanate and declared Aceh to be annexed to the Dutch East Indies proper. The Dutch occupiers believed the war had come to an end; however, they immediately met with continuing resistance from all strata of Aceh society.

== Symbolic resistance leader ==
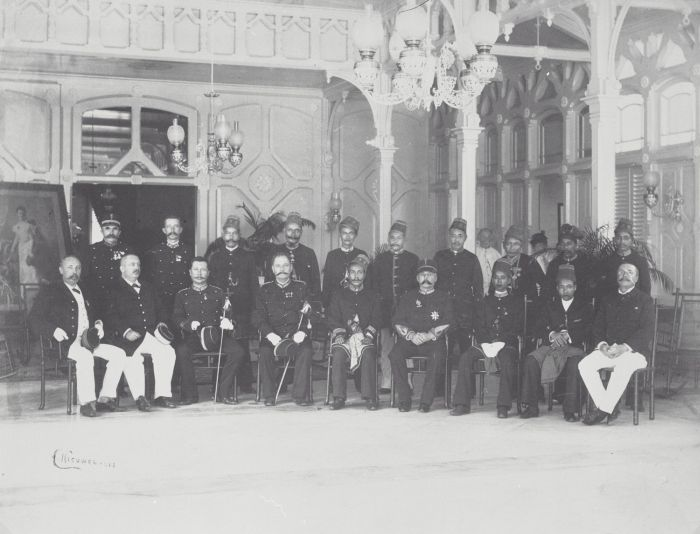
Sultan Muhammad Daud Syah after submission in Banda Aceh, 20 January 1903

After the death of Alauddin Mahmud Syah, the fugitive state administration was dominated by Tuanku Hasyim, Panglima Polem of the XXII Mukims, the Panglima of the XXVI Mukims, and Sri Setia Ulama. The first two were descendants of earlier sultans but not proper claimants to the throne. In their communication with the ulamas (religious leaders) and uleëbalangs (chiefs) they strongly appealed to the religious duty of fighting the "infidel" Dutch, combined with an emerging Acehnese patriotism. In conformity with the customary laws, the elite appointed Tuanku Muhammad Da'ud as the new sultan on 4 March 1875. His name on the throne was Sultan Alauddin Muhammad Da'ud Syah Johan Berdaulat.

The enthronement ceremony took place in the mosque of Lam Teungoh in Aneuk Galong. This was an important step as it seemed to show that Aceh still had a central government. Tuanku Hasyim acted as mangkubumi (regent) for the young sultan who took up residence in Kota Dalam (Keumala Dalam) in the Pidië area. He was eventually declared of age in 1883. His principal wife was Tengku Gambang Gading, daughter of his kinsman Tuanku Abdulmajid; he was also married to Pocut Manyak Cot Murong and Tengku Jam Manikam.

== Further course of the war ==
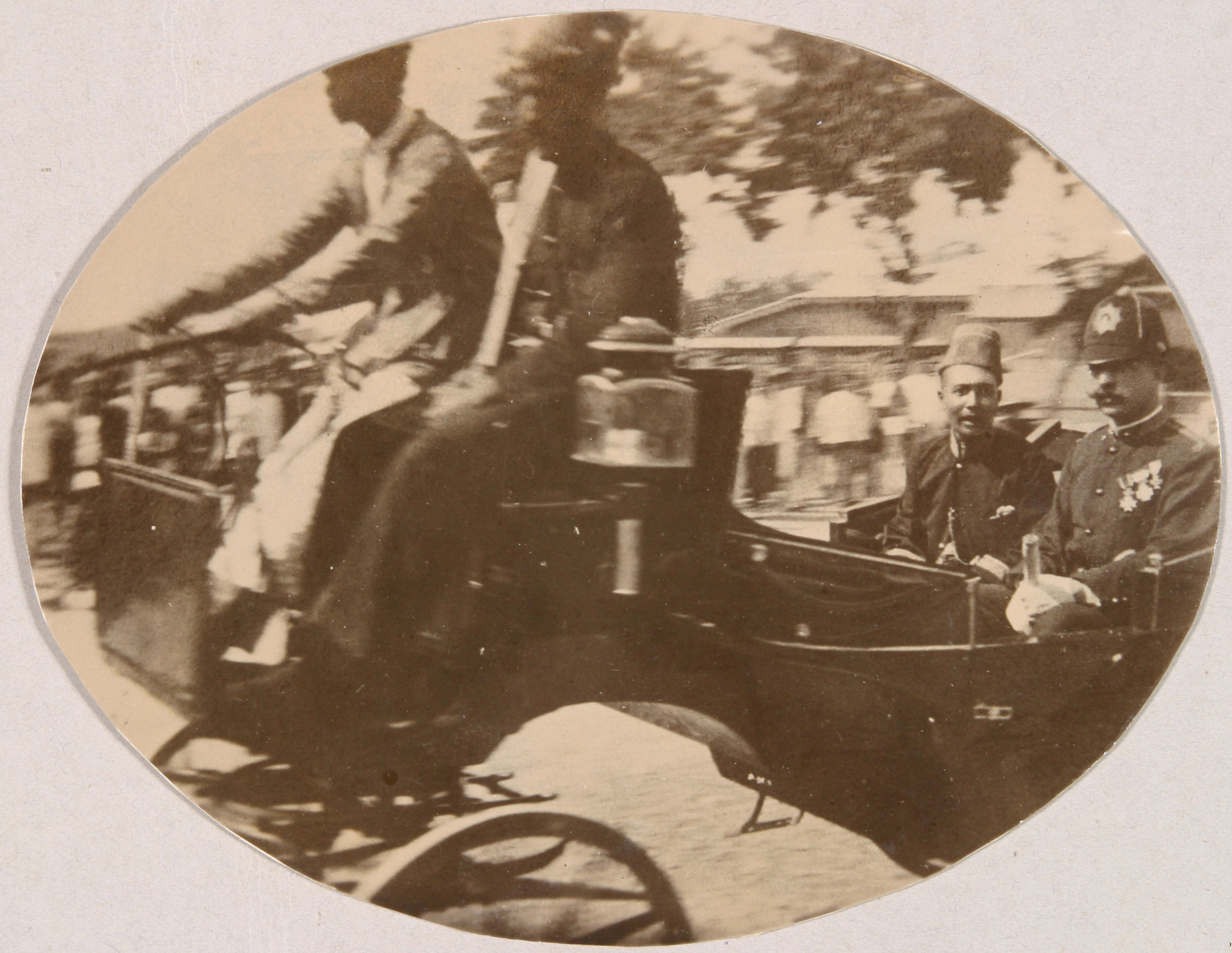
Sultan Muhammad Daud Syah accompanied by major K. van der Maaten on his way to the governor to Kutaraja his submission to the Dutch government.

Meanwhile, the war continued unabated. The common enemy united many of the elite of the old capital, chiefs, religious leaders and other people in an unprecedented way. For long periods the Dutch-occupied area was restricted to 20 square kilometers around Kutaraja.

Among the most important resistance fighters was Teungku Chik di Tiro who gained the sultan's trust and received a royal seal. After his death in 1891 the Acehnese attacks on the Dutch position decreased.

In the 1890s the Dutch tried two ways to come to grips with resistance: either to co-opt local leaders, or to apply new and efficient anti-guerrilla tactics. These strategies slowly gave effect and the sultan and Panglima Polem had to move further towards the north-west coast of Aceh to avoid capture.

== Role of the sultan ==
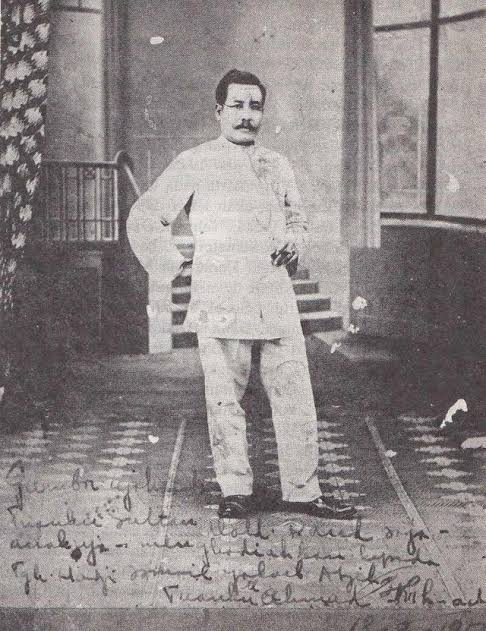
Muhammad Daud Syah in Meester Cornelis, before 1939

The personal role of Alauddin Muhammad Da'ud Syah in the struggle has been debated. The well-known Dutch scholar Christiaan Snouck Hurgronje regarded him as a non-entity of little consequence for the conduct and outcome of the war: "The young sultan, gradually emerging from childhood, soon showed that he aspired to something very different from sharing the weal and woe of his country as leader of the contest against the Gompeuni [the Dutch]. True to the traditions of his house, he sought and still seeks diversion in lawful and unlawful love, drink, fiddling, fights of animals, gambling and the pursuit of elephant and deer."

Later scholarship, on the other hand, has taken a more positive view of his contribution. The sultan was described as a cheerful and handsome man with a royal demeanour towards his chiefs, while at the same time being polite and attentive towards the people with whom he came in contact.

He appealed to Russia to grant the sultanate protectorate status and aid it in repelling the Dutch East India Company. The Sultan's request was rejected, and Aceh was eventually conquered by the Dutch.

At his court he kept some Dutch and Indonesian deserters from the colonial army who were trusted to undertake errands and even taught the sultan some Dutch songs. It was still his distant kinsman Tuanku Hasyim who exerted most of the power at the court while serving as viceroy. As long as Tuanku Hasyim was alive there was no question of surrendering to the colonial troops. The sultan's cousin and father-in-law Tuanku Abdulmajid surrendered to the Dutch in 1887, but this did not have any effect on the devotion of the sultan and viceroy. The well-known resistance fighter Teuku Umar was appointed sea commander (amirul bahri) of the west coast by the sultan but made a deal with the Dutch in 1893 and began to actively fight the Acehnese troops. The sultan sent a letter to Teuku Umar accusing him of apostasy. This, together with other factors such as the influence of his wife Cut Nyak Dhien, caused Teuku Umar to return to the sultan's party after a short while.

== Surrender ==
Tuanku Hasyim died in 1897, and Teuku Umar was killed in 1899. In the same year General J. B. van Heutsz attacked Pidië and forced the surrender of many leaders. After a bloody defeat at Batei Ilie in 1901, the sultan and Panglima Polem fled to the Gayo highlands where the Dutch troops had not yet set foot. Van Heutsz sent the ruthless Major Van Daalen after them with a Marechausse Corps. They were unable to capture the sultan, however.

In 1902, the Dutch Army officer Hans Christoffel managed to capture the principal wife of the sultan, followed a month later by his second wife Cot Murong and one of his sons. Alauddin Muhammad Da'ud Syah was presented with an ultimatum: if he did not surrender within a month his family would be exiled from Aceh. The sultan finally gave in. He inquired to the Dutch authorities whether he would be exiled if he surrendered. This presented a dilemma for Van Heutsz who had previously agreed with his main political advisor Christiaan Snouck Hurgronje that the sultan should be ignored and that consequently no negotiations should take place with him. Van Heutsz nevertheless gave a grudgingly approving reply to the sultan's question: "Well, goddammit, what should I now answer to that?" (Ja, godverdomme, wat moet ik daar nou op antwoorden?). After instructing his principal chiefs to keep on fighting, the sultan met with the Dutch in the forest of Merasa Ië Leubeuë on 10 January 1903 and was taken to Kutaraja. Van Heutsz arranged for a highly publicized ceremony of surrender where a life-size photo of Queen Wilhelmina was displayed in the hall, and he received the sultan from a podium. Panglima Polem followed suit in September in the same year. Snouck Hurgronje was furious with Van Heutsz for disregarding his advice. However, these two surrenders broke much of the remaining resistance, although the Aceh War continued on a lower scale until about 1910–1912.

The Dutch provided the sultan with a comfortable house and a monthly allowance of 1,200 guilders.

In 1907, it was revealed that the sultan had secretly helped plan attacks on Dutch positions. The colonial authorities therefore resolved to exile him to Java and then to Ambon Island. In 1918, he was allowed to settle in Meester Cornelis (Jatinegara) in Batavia. The ex-sultan died there on 6 February 1939 and is buried in Rawamangun. He left a son, Tuanku Raja Ibrahim, who died in 1982.

== Literature ==
- Alfian, Teuku Ibrahim (1976) 'Acheh Sultanate under Sultan Mohammad Daudsyah and the Dutch War', in Sartono Kartodirdjo (ed.), Profiles of Malay Culture: Historiography, Religion and Politics. Jakarta: Ministry of Education and Culture, pp. 147–66.
- Missbach, Antje (2010) 'The Aceh War and the Influence of Christiaan Snouck Hurgronje', in Arndt Graf et al. (eds), Aceh: History, Politics and Culture. Singapore: ISEAS, pp. 39–62.
- Rep, Jelte (1996) Atjeh, Atjeh. Baarn: De Prom.
- Ricklefs, M.C (1993). A History of Modern Indonesia Since c. 1300. Hampshire, UK: MacMillan Press. pp. 143–146. ISBN 978-0-8047-2195-0.
- Snouck Hurgronje, Christiaan (1906) The Achehnese. Vols. I-II. Leiden: Brill.
- Zainuddin, H.M. (1961) Tarich Atjeh dan Nusantara, Jilid I. Medan: Pustaka Iskandar Muda.

Preceded by Alauddin Mahmud Syah II	Sultan of Aceh Sultanate; 1875–1903	Succeeded by Tuanku Raja Ibrahim (never ruled)
