= Tjoet Nja' Dhien =

- Directed by: Eros Djarot
- Written by: Eros Djarot
- Starring: Piet Burnama; Christine Hakim; Rudy Wowor; Slamet Rahardjo
- Cinematography: George Kamarullah
- Edited by: Karsono Hadi
- Music by: Idris Sardi
- Release date: 22 December 1988
- Running time: 108 minutes
- Country: Indonesia
- Languages: Indonesian, Acehnese, Dutch

Tjoet Nja' Dhien (Indonesian pronunciation: [ˌtʃʊt̪̚ ˌɲaʔ ˈdiɛn]) is a 1988 Indonesian film directed by Eros Djarot and starring Piet Burnama, Christine Hakim, Rudy Wowor, and Slamet Rahardjo. Based on the life's story of female Acehnese guerrilla leader Cut Nyak Dhien, it focuses on the six-year period between her second husband, Teuku Umar's death and her capture by the Dutch colonial army. Tjoet Nja' Dhien was released to critical acclaim, winning 9 Citra Awards, and was screened at the Selection de la Semaine de la Critique in Cannes, 1989. It also became Indonesia's submission to the 62nd Academy Awards for the Academy Award for Best Foreign Language Film, but was not nominated.

== Historical background ==
Tjoet Nja' Dhien is based on the life of Cut Nyak Dhien, an Acehnese strategist, political mentor, and freedom fighter. Born to an aristocratic family in Aceh Besar in 1848, Dhien married Teuku Cek Ibrahim Lamnga at a young age. After her father and husband died in separate attempts to repel the Royal Netherlands East Indies Army during the Second Aceh Expedition, Dhien swore revenge against the Dutch colonials.

Dhien started leading troops in the war against the Dutch, eventually uniting her forces with Teuku Umar's. They married in 1880 and she became his chief strategist and political mentor, eventually taking control of the united forces after his death in 1899. The continued fighting took a toll on her health, as she slowly became more fragile.

Due to her deteriorating health, Pang Laot, one of troops, secretly approached the Dutch and offered to surrender Dhien to them on the condition that she be treated fairly. The Dutch stated their agreement, and Dhien was captured on 4 November 1905 in Meulaboh, western Aceh. Imprisoned in Banda Aceh then exiled to Sumedang, West Java, Dhien died in 1908. Since her death she has become one of the most prominent fighters from the Aceh War, being declared a National Hero in 1964.

== Production ==
Director Eros Djarot required two years to complete filming.

Christine Hakim was chosen for the title role of Cut Nyak Dhien. She later described the role as a "huge honor" and "very challenging"; she also credits the role for answering her questions on her identity.

== Plot ==
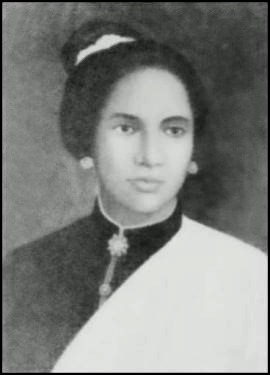
Cut Nyak Dhien, the historical inspiration for Tjoet Nja' Dhien

Tjoet Nja' Dhien focuses on the six-year period between Umar's death and Dhien's capture by the Dutch. Leading her guerrilla troops, Dhien fights against the Dutch colonial army. Although she is supported by her troops and many Acehnese people, some Acehnese leaders have begun collaborating with the Dutch. Within the Dutch military, some commanders and troops commit "barbarous and cruel acts", while others supply weapons to the Acehnese. Eventually, Dhien is captured; not long afterwards, an intertitle stating that the Acehnese continued to fight is shown prior to the credits.

== Symbolism ==
According to Deanne Schultz, Tjoet Nja' Dhien shows the Acehnese guerrillas powered by determination against "overwhelming odds", as well righteous Islamic faith, as contrasted by the commercially motivated Dutch military and colonials. Cut Nyak Dhien herself, steadfastly believing that the Dutch soldiers are "infidels" who have "soiled the land", serves to unite her people in the Aceh War. Schultz argues that the intertitle shown at the end of the film suggests that Dhien's struggle ultimately led to Indonesian independence.

== Reception ==
The film was well received in Indonesia, winning 9 Citra Awards at the 1988 Indonesian Film Festival.

It was chosen as Indonesia's submission to the 62nd Academy Awards for the Academy Award for Best Foreign Language Film, but was not accepted as a nominee. It was also screened at the Selection de la Semaine de la Critique in 1989.

In 2006, Ade Irwansyah of Tabloid Bintang (Star Tabloid) listed Tjoet Nja' Dhien as the best Indonesian film of all time, calling it the "peak achievement of [Indonesia's] film industry up till now." (Note: Original: "... puncak pencapaian dunia perfilman kita yang belum terlewati hingga kini")

Schultz writes that Tjoet Nja' Dhien has "many of the best qualities of popular narrative cinema", including powerful cinematography, a "brave, smart, pious, and loving" main character, and credible villains.

== See also ==
- Cinema of Indonesia
- List of submissions to the 62nd Academy Awards for Best Foreign Language Film
- List of Indonesian submissions for the Academy Award for Best Foreign Language Film
