= Aceh Medal =

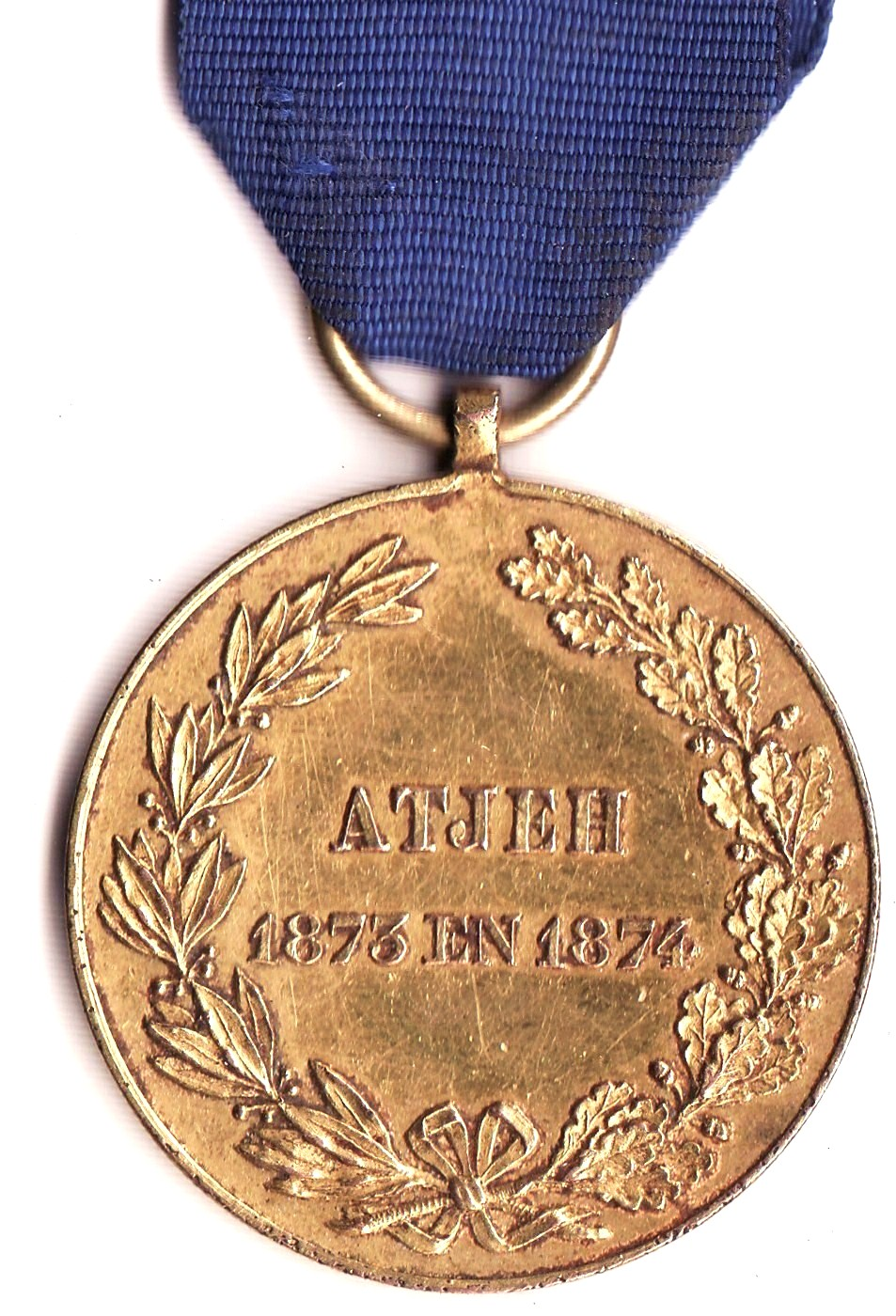
- Aceh Medal, 1873-1874
- Type: Campaign medal
- Presented by: the Kingdom of the Netherlands
- Campaigns: First Aceh War; Second Aceh War
- Established: May 12, 1874
- Ribbon bar of the medal

The Aceh Medal (Dutch: Atjeh-medaille) was founded by King William III of the Netherlands on May 12, 1874, in a royal decree. The medal was presented to troops participating in the First Aceh Expedition and the Second Aceh Expedition.

== Criteria ==
All soldiers participating in the First Aceh Expedition and/or the first six months of the Second Aceh Expedition were entitled to the medal under Royal Decree No. 9 of May 12, 1874. Officially this was called the Aceh Medal 1873–1874, but as the purpose of the operation was to take the Kraton, the medal is also known as the Kraton-medaille.

Recipients of the Aceh medal were also entitled to the Expedition Cross with Atjeh 1873–1874 clasp. This provision in the Royal Decree of April 24, 1875 is contrary to the Dutch rule that no more than one medal may be awarded for a single event.

== Design ==
The Aceh medal is circular and made of gilt bronze. It has a diameter of 36 millimetres (1.4 in). The bronze for the medals comes from the kraton captured bronze cannons. The obverse shows the right facing effigy of King William III of the Netherlands, with the inscription WILLEM III KONING DER NEDERLANDEN GHVL (WILLIAM III King of the Netherlands Grand Duke of Luxembourg). The reverse bears the inscription ATJEH 1873 EN 1874 surrounded by a wreath of laurel and oak leaves. Originally to be spelt ATCHIN, it was changed to the current spelling by a Royal Decree dated August 28, 1874.

The 37 mm wide ribbon was originally dark orange. A Royal Decree dated April 24, 1875 changed the color to "Nassau blue".

== Recipients ==
- Johan Cornelis van der Wijck

== Sources ==
- Dr. W.F. Bax, "Ridderorden, eereteekenen, draagteekens en penningen, betreffende de Weermacht van Nederland en Koloniën (1813-heden)", 1973
- H.G. Meijer, C.P. Mulder en B.W. Wagenaar, "Orders and Decorations of The Netherlands", 1984
