= Alauddin Mahmud Syah II =

34th sultan of Aceh (1870-1874)

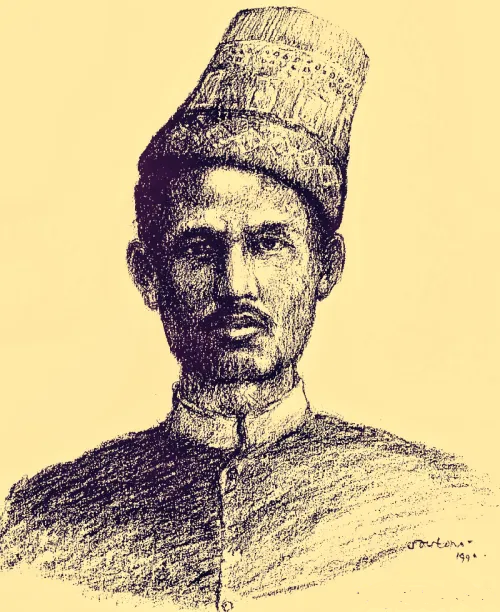
- Sultan Mahmud Syah II of Aceh

Sultan of Aceh Sultanate
- Reign: 1870–1874
- Predecessor: Alauddin Ibrahim Mansur Syah
- Successor: Alauddin Muhammad Da'ud Syah II
- Died: 28 January 1874
- Father: Alauddin Sulaiman Ali Iskandar Syah
- Religion: Islam

Sultan Alauddin Mahmud Syah II (died 28 January 1874) was the thirty-fourth sultan of Aceh in northern Sumatra. He reigned from 1870 to 1874 and was the last sultan to rule Aceh before the colonial invasion.

== Rivalries at the court ==
He was the son of Sultan Alauddin Sulaiman Ali Iskandar Syah (d. 1857) and a commoner wife. When his granduncle Alauddin Ibrahim Mansur Syah died in 1870 without living sons, Alauddin Mahmud Syah was enthroned, still a minor. He married Pocut Meurah Awan as his main wife. His main councilors were Panglima Tibang and the Arab Habib Abdurrahman Az-Zahir. The latter had exerted influence on the late sultan and was appointed guardian to the young successor who greatly admired his tutor. The two councilors were at odds with each other; Habib Abdurrahman realized that Aceh could not stay isolated from the world and favoured an understanding with the Dutch colonial state, while Panglima Tibang was averse to any compromise with Aceh's independent position.

== Sumatra Treaty ==
The independence of Aceh had been granted by the Anglo-Dutch Treaty of 1824, but it was obvious that the old state of things would not last long. The opening of the Suez Canal in 1869 meant that the Melaka Straits became one of the world's most important sea routes. It was therefore highly desirable for the Dutch to gain control over northern Sumatra, and to secure that no other power gained foothold there. Negotiations with the British proceeded and an agreement was finally signed on 2 November 1871, the Sumatra Treaty. The Netherlands removed restrictions on British trade on Sumatra. In a separate but related treaty it ceded the Dutch Gold Coast in Africa. In return it gained free hands to expand in northern Sumatra - there was no more guarantee for an independent Aceh. Through a particular treaty the Dutch also got the right to recruit indentured labour from British India for Surinam. All this was done entirely over the head of the Acehnese sultan who was not consulted.

== Failed diplomacy ==
The Netherlands now exerted diplomatic pressure on the Aceh court to accept a satisfactory treaty. The officer Krayenhoff visited Aceh in May 1872 but was not allowed to meet the sultan since Habib Abdurrachman was away. Shortly afterwards Alauddin Mahmud Syah commissioned Habib Abdurrachman to seek political support from the Ottoman Empire whose ruler was still revered by the Acehnese as the Lord of the Faithful. Meanwhile Panglima Tibang proceeded to Riau where he asked the Dutch authorities for a delay of further negotiations for six months, which was granted. The idea was to win time pending the possibility of a positive Ottoman reply. After two months Panglima Tibang headed back to Aceh on the Dutch ship Marnix. On the way he called at Singapore where he entered into secret negotiations with the American and Italian consuls. The American and Italian home governments were not involved, but as news about the negotiations leaked out the Dutch authorities were greatly alarmed. The prospect of getting a Western neighbour on Sumatra was deeply disturbing for the colonial policy of the Netherlands. The Ottoman involvement turned out to be less of a problem; although the mission of Habib Abdurrachman gained some sympathies at the Porte, Turkey was too weak to undertake anything.

== Aceh War ==
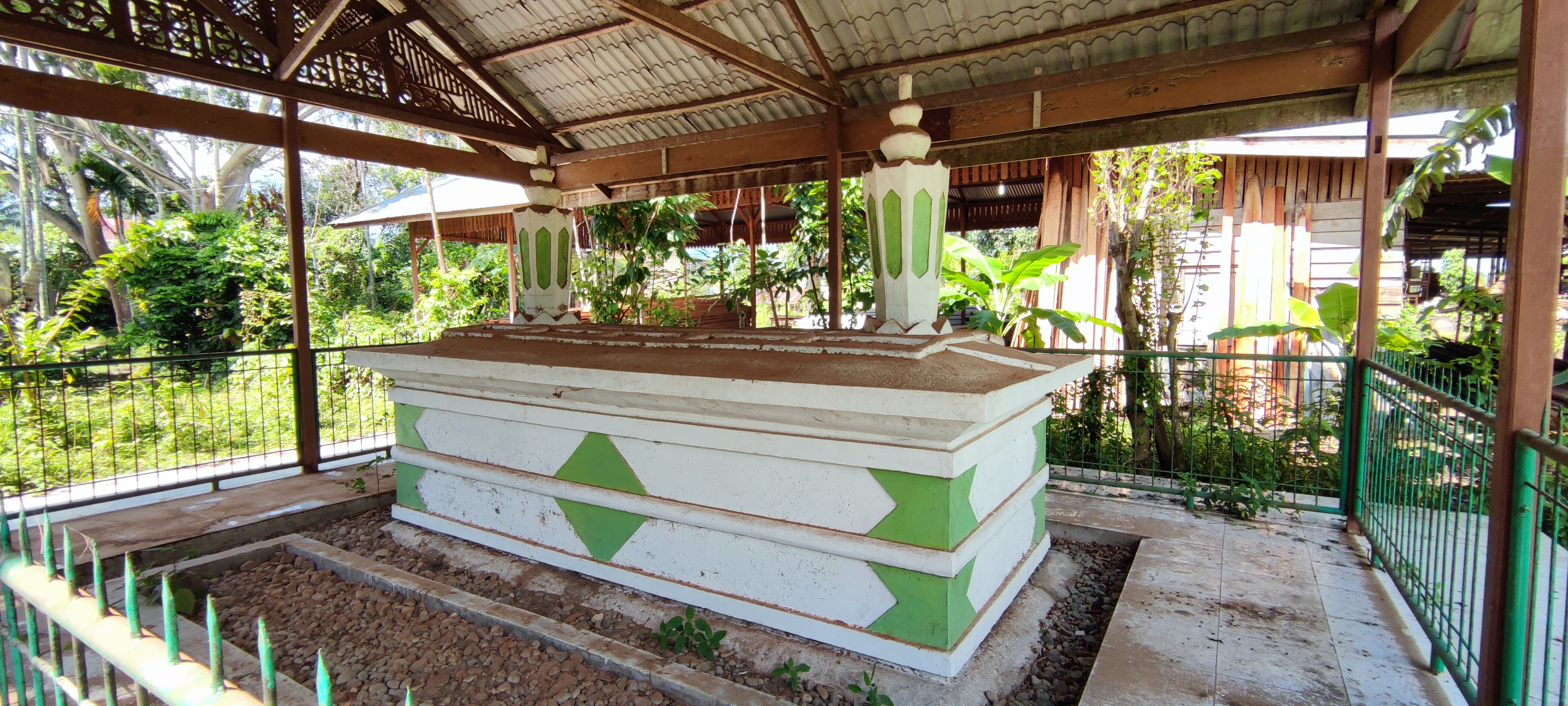
The tomb of Sultan Mahmud Syah II in Sama Hani, Aceh Besar Regency

The Governor-General in Batavia, James Loudon, considered that the Acehnese sultan must be given the choice of acknowledging Dutch supremacy or face war. He held on to this even after it appeared that Alauddin Mahmud Syah was not personally involved in the Singapore negotiations. The official J.F.N. Nieuwenhuyzen was dispatched to Aceh in March 1873. Arriving to the roadstead outside the capital he issued an ultimatum. The reply was evasive and on 26 March war was declared.

This was the start of the Aceh War that would keep the Dutch colonial army busy for the next four decades. Some days later an army of 3,600 men under General J.H.R. Köhler arrived by sea. The troops landed and the fortified Baiturrahman Grand Mosque was taken. However, General Köhler was killed in the process and an attempt on the sultan's palace failed. The expedition returned to Java in April after having utterly failed. A second expedition under Jan van Swieten, almost twice as strong, landed in December 1873. This time it was well prepared. The mosque was again taken on 6 January 1874, and the palace was occupied on 24 January after the defenders had deserted it. Sultan Alauddin Mahmud Syah, who was sick with cholera, had been evacuated on 15 January and brought to Luëng Bata. He died there on 28 January 1874. However, the idea held by the Dutch military leadership that the fall of the capital would make an end to the war, proved entirely false. A new sultan, Alauddin Muhammad Da'ud Syah II, was proclaimed in the next year and would symbolize resistance against the intruders until 1903.

== See also ==
- First Aceh Expedition
- Second Aceh Expedition
- Aceh Sultanate

== Literature ==
- Doel, Wim van den (2011) Zo ver de wereld strekt: De geschiedenis van Nederland Overzee, vanaf 1800. Amsterdam: Bert Bakker.
- Encyclopaedie van Nederlandsch-Indië (1917), Vol. 1. 's Gravenhage & Leiden: M. Nijhoff & Brill.
- Klerck, E.S. de (1975) History of the Netherlands East Indies. Amsterdam: B.M. Israël NV.
- Reid, Anthony (2010) 'Aceh and the Turkish Connection', in Arndt Graf et al. (eds), Aceh: History, Politics and Culture. Singapore: ISEAS, pp. 26–38.
- Zainuddin, H.M. (1961) Tarich Atjeh dan Nusantara, Jilid I. Medan: Pustaka Iskandar Muda.

Preceded by Alauddin Ibrahim Mansur Syah	Sultan of Aceh; 1870–1874	Succeeded by Alauddin Muhammad Da'ud Syah II
