= Alauddin Sulaiman Ali Iskandar Syah =

Sultan of Aceh

Alauddin Sulaiman Ali Iskandar Syah علاء الدين سليمان علي اسكندر شاه
- Sultan
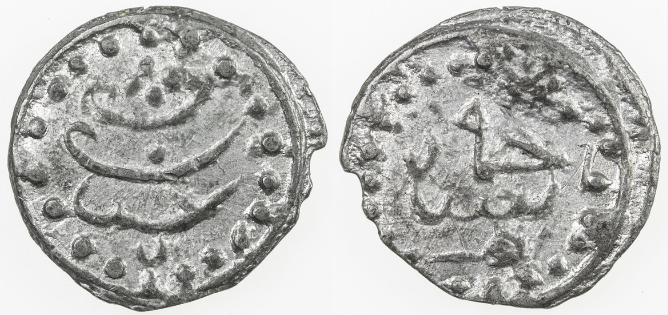
- Aceh coin from the era of Sultan Sulaiman Ali Iskandar Shah.

Sultan of Aceh
- Reign: 1838 - 1857
- Predecessor: Alauddin Muhammad Daud Syah I
- Successor: Alauddin Ibrahim Mansur Syah
- Born: Bandar Aceh Darussalam, Aceh Sultanate
- Died: 1857; Bandar Aceh Darussalam, Aceh Sultanate
- House: Aceh-Wajoq
- Father: Alauddin Muhammad Daud Syah I
- Religion: Islam Sunni

Sultan Alauddin Sulaiman Ali Iskandar Syah (died 1857) was the thirty-second sultan of Aceh in northern Sumatra. His largely nominal reign lasted from 1838 to 1857.

== Nominal sultan ==
Originally called Raja Sulaiman, he was the only son of Sultan Alauddin Muhammad Da'ud Syah I. When his father died in 1838, Raja Sulaiman was nominally put on the throne under the name Alauddin Sulaiman Ali Iskandar Syah. However, he was still only a child. His forceful uncle Ibrahim was in fact made acting sultan; as such he is known as Alauddin Ibrahim Mansur Syah (1838-1870). The latter married his daughter Sribanun to the young Alauddin Sulaiman Ali Iskandar Syah. The sultan was also married to Tengku Seriati binti Abbas who was likewise his first cousin.

== Incidents with the Dutch ==
The nominal reign of Alauddin Sulaiman Ali Iskandar Syah was filled with incidents with the Dutch colonial state. Although Aceh was still entirely independent, it was considered a part of the Dutch sphere of interest following the Anglo-Dutch Treaty of 1824. In 1839 the important port Barus, hitherto a part of the Acehnese possessions, was occupied by the Dutch whose claims to that place went back before 1779. That triggered an Acehnese counter-attack in October in the same year, departing from Tapus and Singkil. This in turn led to Dutch forces taking these two places in 1840. The Acehnese attempted to attack Singkil in 1848, which caused the Dutch to seek support from Trumon, a principality which had formerly stood under Aceh but withdrawn around 1830. The raja of Trumon received 200 guilders per month for his assistance. The flourishing pepper trade was occasionally disturbed when ships belonging to European powers were plundered. On one occasion in 1844 the two ports Kuala Bateë and Meureudu were chastised by British warships after a set of piratical acts. Acehnese power over part of the east coast of Sumatra, including Langkat, Serdang, Batubara, Deli and Asahan was strengthened in 1853-54 thanks to the efforts of the senior sultan Alauddin Ibrahim Mansur Syah.

== Power struggles ==
When Alauddin Sulaiman Ali Iskandar Syah had come to age he demanded the powers that were due to him from his uncle. However, Alauddin Ibrahim Mansur Syah refused to step down. As a consequence a civil war broke out in 1854. The nominal sultan was supported by the panglimas (headmen) of two of the regions, the XXV Mukims and XXVI Mukims, plus a further number of chiefs. His uncle, the acting sultan, found support from other important chiefs. This made for a long and violent struggle between the two parties. Alauddin Ibrahim Mansur Syah was able to dominate the capital Kutaraja while his nephew stayed at the VI Mukims, part of the XXV Mukims. The uleëbalang (chief) of the VII Mukims, part of the XXII Mukims, showed his strength by attacking the palace in Kutaraja, after which Alauddin Sulaiman Ali Iskandar Syah married the chief's sister. However, he died in 1857 without gaining the capital, leaving his rival as the sole ruler. He left a son called Mahmud, born from a commoner wife; this prince later became sultan in 1870.

== Literature ==
- Encyclopaedie van Nederlandsch-Indië (1917), Vol. 1. 's Gravenhage & Leiden: M. Nijhoff & Brill.
- Langen, K.F.H. van (1888), De inrichting van het Atjehsche staatsbestuur onder het sultanaat. 's Gravenhage: M. Nijhoff.
- Said, H. Mohammad (1981) Aceh sepanjang abad, Jilid pertama. Medan: Waspada.
- Zainuddin, H.M. (1961) Tarich Atjeh dan Nusantara, Jilid I. Medan: Pustaka Iskandar Muda.

Preceded by Alauddin Muhammad Da'ud Syah I	Sultan of Aceh; 1838-1857	Succeeded by Alauddin Ibrahim Mansur Syah
