= Lombok Cross =

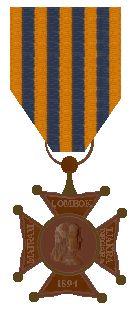
- Obverse of the Lombok Cross
- Type: Military decoration
- Awarded for: Service on a military expedition
- Presented by: the Kingdom of the Netherlands
- Campaign: Lombok expedition, 1894
- Status: No longer awarded
- Established: 13 April 1895
- Ribbon of the medal

Precedence
- Next (higher): Expedition Cross
- Next (lower): War Commemorative Cross

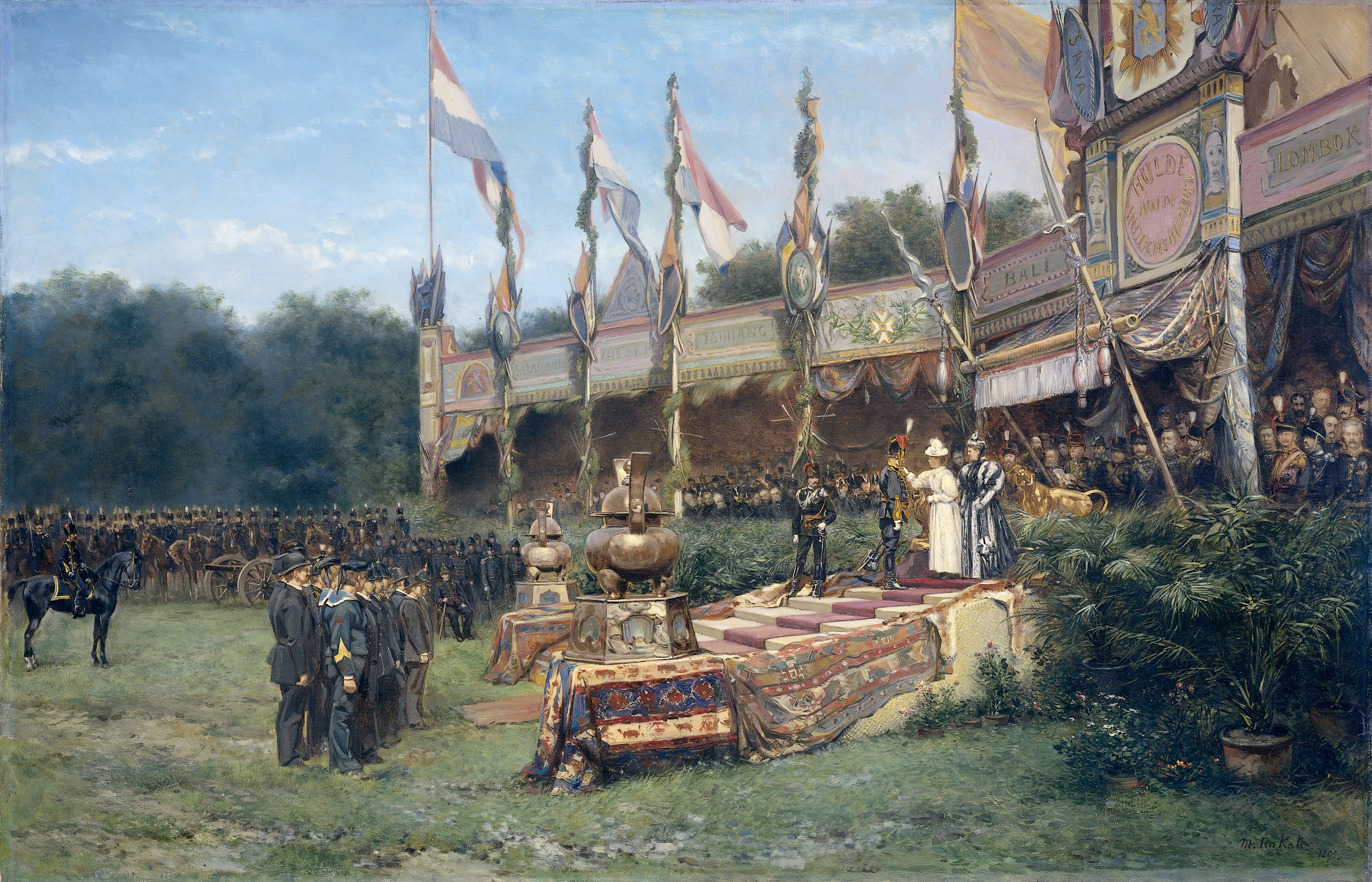
Presentation of the Lombok cross by Queen Wilhelmina at the Malieveld in The Hague, 6 July 1895

The Lombok Cross (Dutch: Lombokkruis) is a military award of the Kingdom of the Netherlands. The medal was established to commemorate service in the Dutch intervention in Lombok and Karangasem which took place between June and December 1894. The medal was established on 13 April 1895 by Queen Regent Emma of the Netherlands, acting for the underage Queen Wilhelmina.

== Appearance ==
The medal is a bronze Cross pattée with concave ends on the arms and ball finials on the points. The obverse of the cross bears the effigy of the young queen facing right in the center of the cross. Each arm bears an inscription；on the top is LOMBOK, MATARAM on the left； TJAKRA-NEGARA on the right, and 1894 on the bottom arm. The reverse of the cross depicts the rampant Dutch lion in a wreath. The arms are inscribed HULDE AAN at the top, LEGER on the left, EN at the bottom, and VLOOT on the right (Homage to Army and Fleet). The medal hangs from a ring suspension on a ribbon 40 mm (1.6 in) wide of nine equal stripes, five in orange-yellow and four of Nassau blue.
