= Hans Christoffel =

Military officer of the Dutch colonial army

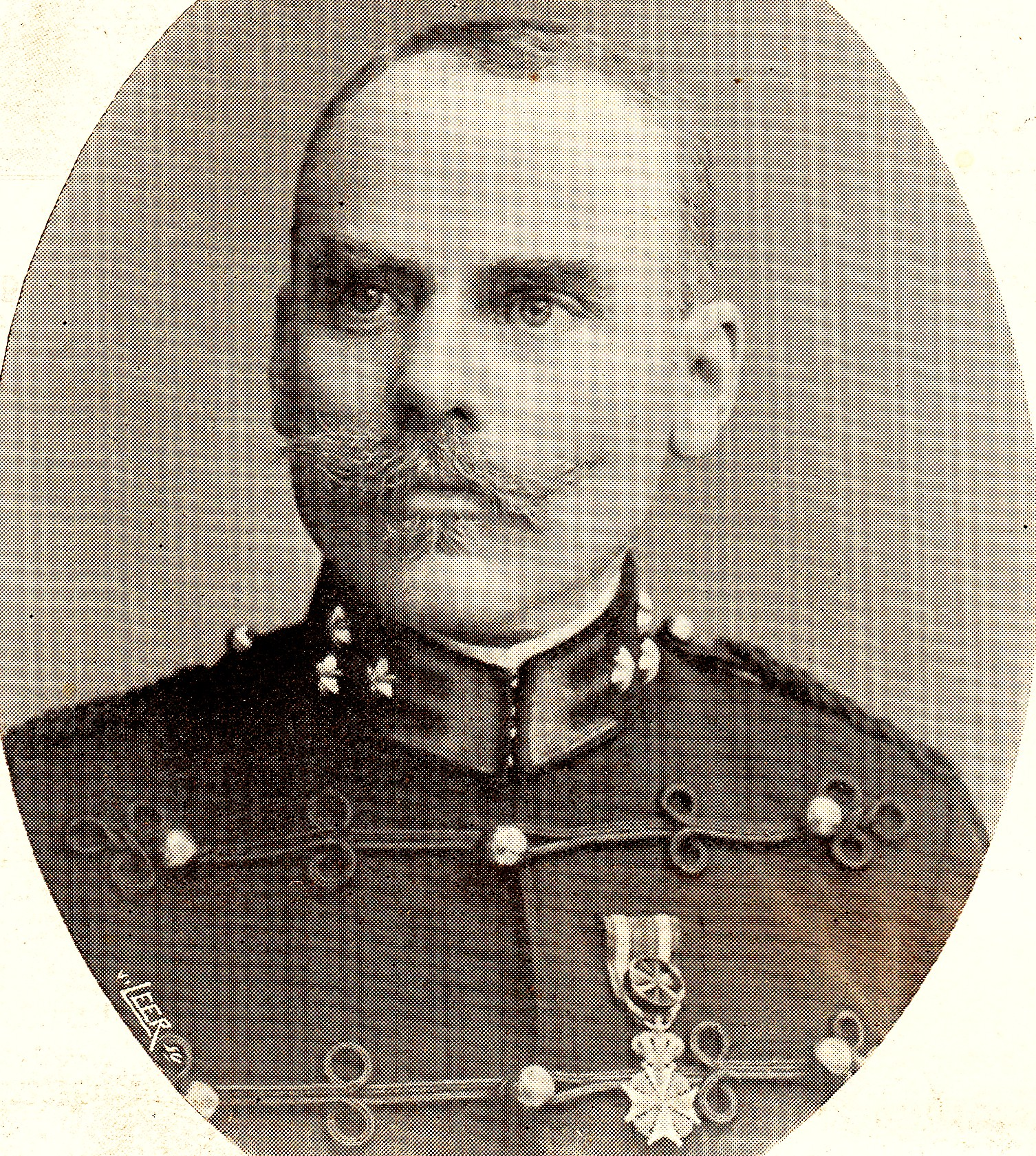
- Born: Hans Christoffel; 13 September 1865; Rothenbrunnen, Switzerland
- Died: 3 April 1962 (aged 96); Antwerp, Belgium
- Spouse: Adolphina Anna Maria Martha van Rijswijck
- Military career
- Allegiance: Dutch East Indies
- Branch: Royal Netherlands East Indies Army
- Service years: 1886–1910
- Rank: Captain
- Battles: Aceh War; South Sulawesi expeditions of 1905; Batak War
- Awards: Honorary Sabre

Hans Christoffel (born 13 September 1865 in Rothenbrunnen; died 3 April 1962 in Antwerp) was a Swiss-born, and from 1906, Dutch mercenary and officer in the Dutch colonial army.

== Life ==
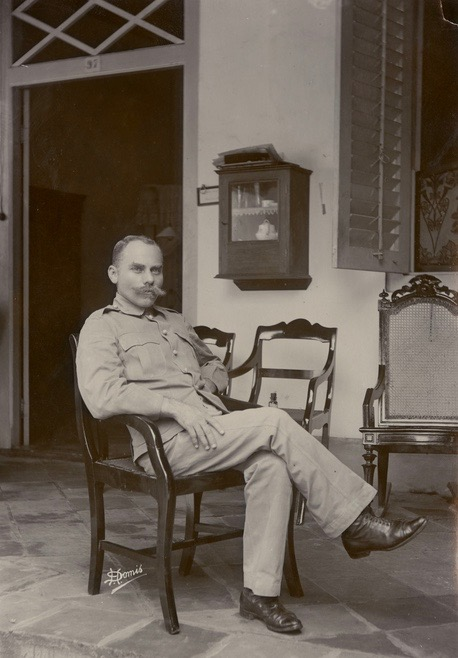
Portrait of Hans Christoffel in the Dutch East Indies, 1907

Raised as the son of a farmer in Rothenbrunnen, Hans Christoffel began his schooling in 1882 at the Bündner Kantonsschule in Chur but did not complete his studies. Some accounts suggest he briefly studied theology at the University of Bologna for one semester before leaving for the Netherlands. In 1884, he traveled via Italy and Germany to Harderwijk in the Netherlands, where he enlisted in the Royal Dutch East Indies Army (KNIL) in 1886 for a six-year term of service.

After arriving in Java, he was promoted to corporal in 1887 and transferred to the Moluccas as a quartermaster. In 1892, he extended his contract by two years and was transferred to Aceh, where the colonial army had been engaged in a bitter war against local resistance fighters since 1873. In the following years, he was active on the front lines and rose to the rank of second lieutenant. From 1902 onward, he was a member of the Gendarmerie Corps on foot, tasked with anti-guerrilla operations in the Aceh War by Military Governor J. B. van Heutsz.

During a campaign against the Sultanate of Borneo in 1904, he was involved in brutal military actions that resulted in significant losses among the local population.

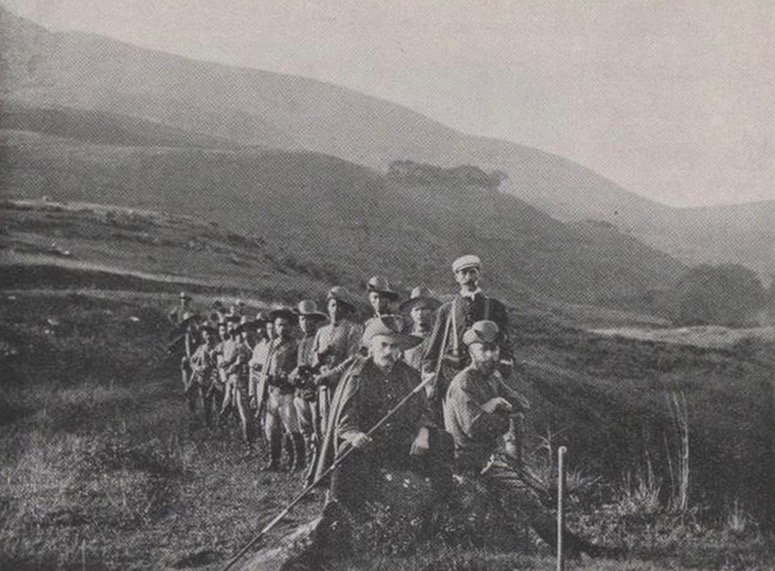
Hans Christoffel and his brigade near Sagala, 1907

In 1906, Christoffel renounced his Swiss citizenship and adopted Dutch nationality. After returning to Europe for health reasons, he married Adolphina Anna Maria Martha van Rijswijck, daughter of the former mayor of Antwerp, Jan van Rijswijck (1852–1906), in 1909; the marriage remained childless. In 1910, he returned to Java but resigned from his position at the end of the year and worked as a concession broker for several years.

Despite his brutal methods, which drew public and military criticism, Hans Christoffel remained protected by his superiors and was honored for his military achievements. He was portrayed as a hero in the press but preferred not to comment publicly on his actions after his term of service. In 1930, he settled permanently in Antwerp. He had donated numerous objects to the local museum in 1922, which he had bought, stolen, or looted during his time in Southeast Asia. His collection is now housed in the Museum aan de Stroom in Antwerp.

== Orders and decorations ==
Hans Christoffel's honors included the Knight of the Military Order of Wilhelm, 3rd class, and the Order of the Netherlands Lion.
