= Johan Köhler =

Dutch general (1818–1873)

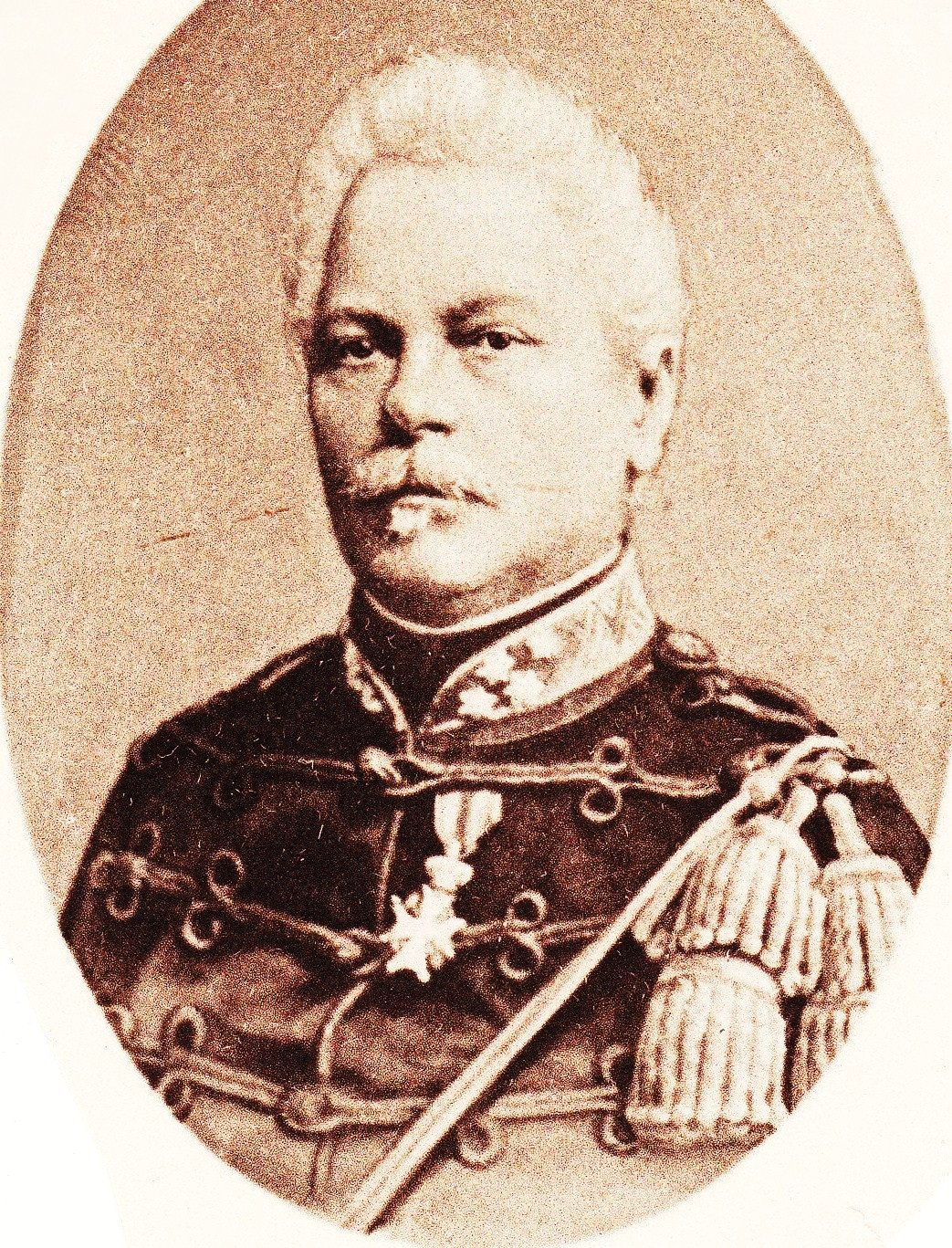
- Born: Johan Harmen Rudolf Köhler; 3 July 1818; Groningen, Netherlands
- Died: 14 April 1873 (aged 54); Banda Aceh, Aceh Sultanate
- Burial place: Kebon Jahe Kober
- Spouse: J. Beekhuis
- Children: 4
- Military career
- Allegiance: Dutch East Indies
- Branch: Royal Netherlands East Indies Army
- Service years: 1832–1873
- Rank: Major-general
- Battles: First Aceh Expedition †
- Awards: Military Order of William

Johan Harmen Rudolf Köhler (1818 – 14 April 1873) was a Dutch general in the Royal Netherlands East Indies Army who was active in the Dutch East Indies from the 1830s to his death. He participated in the outbreak of the Aceh War, but was killed near the Baiturrahman Grand Mosque during the First Aceh Expedition.

== Early life ==
Johan Harmen Rudolf Köhler was born in Groningen, Netherlands, on 3 July 1818. He married J. Beekhuis, with whom he had four children, on 29 January 1859.

== Career ==
Köhler enlisted into the 9th Infantry Division on 3 May 1832, and participated in Dutch military campaigns in Belgium in 1832. He was promoted to corporal on 21 May 1834, fourier on 16 December 1836, and sergeant on 2 July 1838. He was transferred to the Royal Netherlands East Indies Army and left for the Dutch East Indies on 14 November 1839. He rose to second lieutenant four months after arriving in the East Indies, to first lieutenant on 4 October 1847, and captain on 29 February 1852.

Lampung was governed by Köhler in the 1850s. In 1856, he became the Government Commissioner for Lampung. The Military Order of William was given to Köhler on 7 January 1857, for his service in Lampung.

During Köhler's time on leave from 1857 to 1859, he was promoted to major in June 1858. He was placed in command of the 2nd Infantry Battalion in 1859, and then the Garrison Battalion of Banka in 1860. He was promoted to lieutenant colonel in April 1862, colonel on 28 September 1865, and major general on 7 January 1873.

Köhler led a force of 3,000 in the First Aceh Expedition to force the Aceh Sultanate into being a Dutch protectorate. Eeldert Christiaan van Daalen served as his deputy during the campaign. His army arrived at Panté Ceureumèn on 6 April 1873, and reached the Baiturrahman Grand Mosque on 10 April. Köhler was killed by Acehnese soldiers on 14 April, under a tree near the mosque. 45 men died, with 8 of those being officers, and 405 were wounded. This campaign launched the Aceh War which would continue for another thirty years.

King William III of the Netherlands gave his condolences to Köhler's relatives while visiting Groningen. Köhler's soldiers were unable to bring his body with them and he was buried in Aceh. In 1954, Köhler's remains were reinterned at the Peutjoet Cemetery. The tree that Köhler died under was cut down in 2015.

== Works cited ==
=== Books ===
- Hellwig, Tineke; Tagliacozzo, Eric, eds. (2009). The Indonesia Reader: History, Culture, Politics. Duke University Press. doi:10.2307/j.ctv11315rf. ISBN 9780822392279.
- Means, Gordon (2009). Political Islam in Southeast Asia. Lynne Rienner Publishers. ISBN 9781685850838.

=== News ===
- "Groningen". Leeuwarder Courant. 23 May 1873. p. 74.
- "Johan, Harmen, Rudolff Köhler". Leeuwarder Courant. 18 April 1873. p. 91.
- "Indonesië zorgt goed voor Nederlandse begraafplaats". Radio Netherlands Worldwide. 1 February 2010. Archived from the original on 16 September 2016.
- "Pohon 'Kohler di MRB Ditebang". Tribun Network. 21 November 2015. Archived from the original on 15 July 2025.
- Fajriansyah, Adrian; Salasah, ebiyyah (8 September 2024). "Belum ke Aceh kalau Belum ke Jantung Hati "Ureueng" Aceh, Masjid Raya Baiturrahman". Kompas. Archived from the original on 15 July 2025.

=== Web ===
- "Koning Willem III bezoekt de vader van de in Atjeh gesneuvelde generaal Köhler, 1873". Rijksmuseum. Archived from the original on 15 July 2025.
- "Militaire Willems-Orde: Köhler, J.H.R." Ministry of Defence. Archived from the original on 20 September 2021.
- "Portret van generaal-majoor Johan Harmen Rudolf Köhler". Rijksmuseum. Archived from the original on 15 July 2025.
