= Abdurrahman Az-Zahir =

Indian political leader (1833–1896)

Habib Abdurrahman Az-Zahir
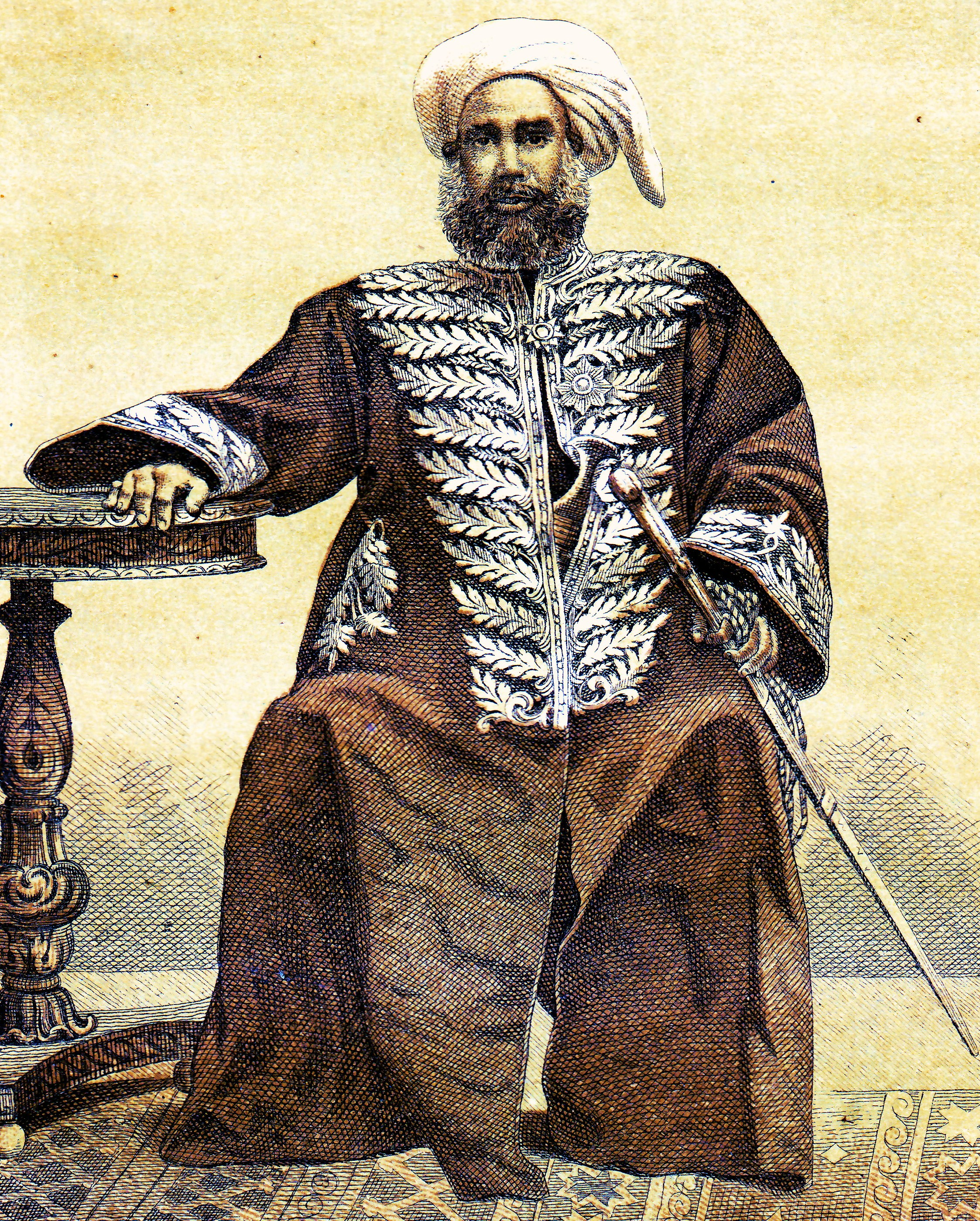
- Born: 1833; Badqara Village, Malabar, India
- Died: 1896 (aged 62–63); Mecca, Ottoman Empire
- Occupations: Political leader, religious scholar, diplomat
- Known for: Resistance against Dutch colonialism in Aceh

Habib Abdurrahman Az-Zahir (1833–1896) was a Hadhrami political, religious, and diplomatic leader who played a pivotal role in resisting Dutch colonialism in the Sultanate of Aceh in Indonesia during the 19th century. He is regarded as a symbol of Islamic jihad against colonialism and a key figure in promoting Muslim unity in Southeast Asia.

== Early life and education ==
Az-Zahir was born in 1833 in Budqara village, Malabar, India, to a Hadhrami family of the Alawiyyin Sayyids. His ancestry traces to Ali al-Uraydi, a descendant of the Prophet Muhammad through Husayn ibn Ali. He studied at Al-Azhar University in Cairo under scholar Ibrahim al-Bajuri. He was later trained in Islamic jurisprudence in Mecca under Ahmad Zayni Dahlan, the Grand Mufti of Mecca. Following training, Az-Zahir completed advanced studies in Kolkata, India, focusing on Islamic theology and statecraft.

== Role in the Aceh War ==
Az-Zahir arrived in Aceh in 1864 under Ottoman diplomatic auspices. He was then appointed as Chief Judge of Aceh and Imam of Baiturrahman Grand Mosque. During his tenure, he reformed Aceh's administration, abolished opium trade, and fortified coastal defenses. Az-Zahir led Acehnese forces against General J.H.R. Köhler's troops, killing Köhler and repelling the Dutch. During those times, he also coordinated guerrilla tactics and secured Ottoman arms shipments via Penang. During those times, he led Ajaj groups against the Dutch, liberating that way such regions as Kli Kuluda and Kring Raya. Despite inflicting heavy losses at Bukit Serum, he defeated the Dutch at the Battle of Kli Taron. The Dutch sent in reinforcements and were able to reclaim Montasik, Sonop, Ank Pati, and Ank Kalung. Az-Zahir confronted the Dutch in the Battle of Longi which many Agions lost their lives.

=== Diplomatic campaigns ===
In 1873, Az-Zahir traveled to Istanbul, where he helped secure Ottoman military support but faced European pressure blocking direct intervention. He then negotiated with British officials in Singapore to circumvent the Anglo-Dutch Treaty of 1824. Despite cholera outbreaks and Dutch naval blockades, Imam Az-Zahir defended Banda Aceh until the Sultan's surrender. He continued guerrilla resistance in Aceh's interior until his exile in 1878. While in exile, Az-Zahir established a government-in-exile in Penang, Malaysia, with Acehnese and Arab elites, called Council of Eight.

The council was responsible for smuggling weapons and funds to Aceh through Dutch blockades, as well as publications of anti-colonial manifestos in international newspapers like The New York Times.

== Exile and death ==
Abdurrahman Az-Zahir have surrendered to Dutch forces in 1878 after the collapse of organized resistance. The Dutch court has exiled him to Mecca, where he wrote memoirs and advised Ottoman officials until his death in 1896.

== Legacy ==
Az-Zahir is recognized by Indonesia as a symbol of anti-colonial resistance. Aceh celebrates his legacy annually. He inspired 20th-century anti-colonial leaders, including Abd el-Krim of Morocco to continue the fight.
