= Expedition Cross =

Former Dutch military award

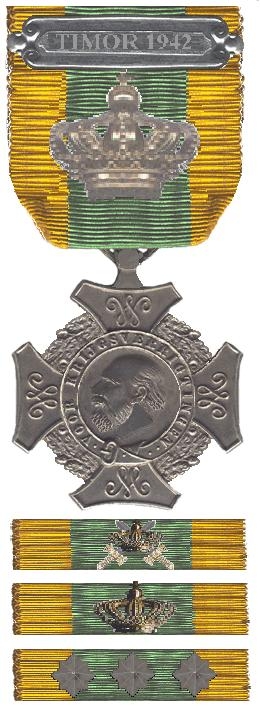
- Expedition Cross with clasp for Timor 1942 and mentioned in dispatches crown. Below the cross are ribbon bars showing appurtenances for the Honorary Sabre, Honourable Mention, and three clasps
- Type: Military decoration
- Awarded for: Service on military expeditions
- Presented by: the Kingdom of the Netherlands
- Clasps: 33 total
- Status: No longer awarded
- Established: 19 February 1869

Precedence
- Next (higher): Decoration of Merit
- Next (lower): Lombok Cross

The Expedition Cross (Dutch: Expeditiekruis) officially known as the Cross for Important Military Operations (Dutch: Ereteken voor Belangrijke Krijgsbedrijven) was a military decoration of Kingdom of the Netherlands. Created by royal decree on 19 February 1869, by King William III, the cross was awarded for participation in major military operations between 1846 and 1942.

== Description ==
The Expedition Cross is a four-armed silver metal cross, 39 millimetres (1.5 in) in diameter. The obverse bears the effigy of King William III in a round center medallion, surrounded by a garter with the inscription VOOR KRIJGSVERRIGTINGEN (for military operations). Between the arms of the cross is a wreath of oak leaves. On each of the four the arms is a "W" monogram. The reverse is plain.

The ribbon is light green with yellow-orange borders.

== Clasps ==
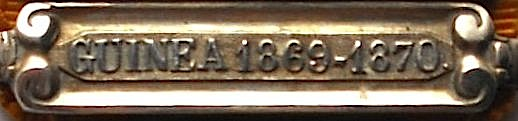
clasp for Guinea 1869-1870

Campaign clasps are also silver and are 42 mm by 9 mm, they are worn on the ribbon of the medal. When the cross was established there were six clasps, in subsequent years the total number of clasps rose to 33.

- Bali 1846
- Bali 1848
- Bali 1849
- Borneo 1850–1854
- Boni 1859
- Borneo 1859–1863
- Guinea 1869–1870
- Deli 1872
- Atjeh 1873–1874
- Atjeh 1873–1876
- Samalangan 1877
- Atjeh 1873–1880
- Atjeh 1873–1885
- Atjeh 1873–1890
- Tamiang 1893
- Atjeh 1873–1896
- Atjeh 1896–1900
- Korintji 1903
- Djambi 1901–1904
- Gajo en Alaslanden 1904
- Atjeh 1901–1905
- Midden-Sumatra 1903–1907
- Zuid-Celebes 1905–1908
- Flores 1907–1908
- Kleine Soenda-eilanden 1905–1909
- Atjeh 1906–1910
- Nieuw-Guinea 1907–1915
- Atjeh 1911–1914
- W.Afd. Borneo 1912–1914
- N. Guinea 1907–1915
- Ceram 1915
- W-Kust Atjeh 1925-1927
- Timor 1942
