= Teuku Umar =

Acehnese guerrilla leader (1854–1899)

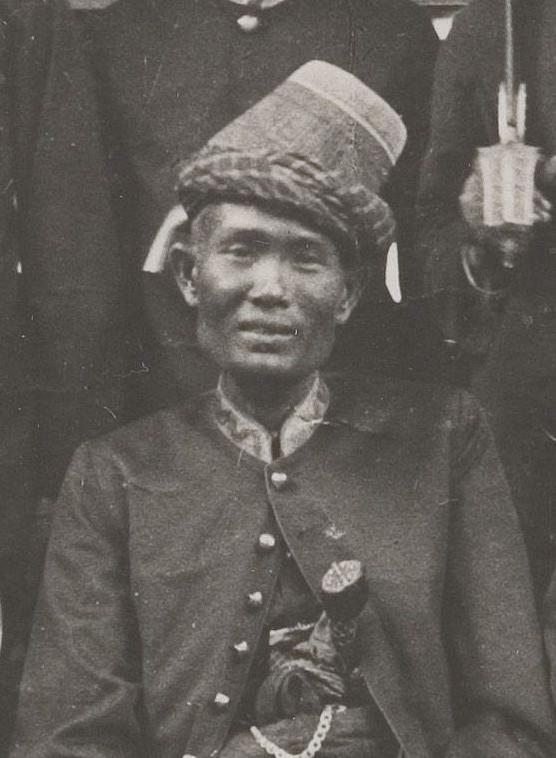
- Teuku Umar, c. 1890
- Born: 1854; Meulaboh, Aceh Sultanate
- Died: 11 February 1899 (aged 44–45); Meulaboh, Aceh Sultanate
- Spouses: Cut Nyak Sofiah, Cut Meuligou/Nyak Malighai, Cut Nyak Dhien
- Children: From Cut Meuligou: Teuku Sapeh; Teuku Raja Sulaiman; Cut Mariyam; Cut Sjak; Cut Teungoh; Teuku Bidin; From Cut Nyak Dhien; Cut Gambang

Teuku Umar (1854 – 11 February 1899) was a leader of a guerrilla campaign against the Dutch in Aceh during the Aceh War. He died when Dutch troops launched a surprise attack in Meulaboh. His body was buried in the Mugo area. Afterward, his wife Cut Nyak Dhien continued to lead the guerrillas. He was later made a Pahlawan Nasional Indonesia (National Hero of Indonesia).

== Life ==
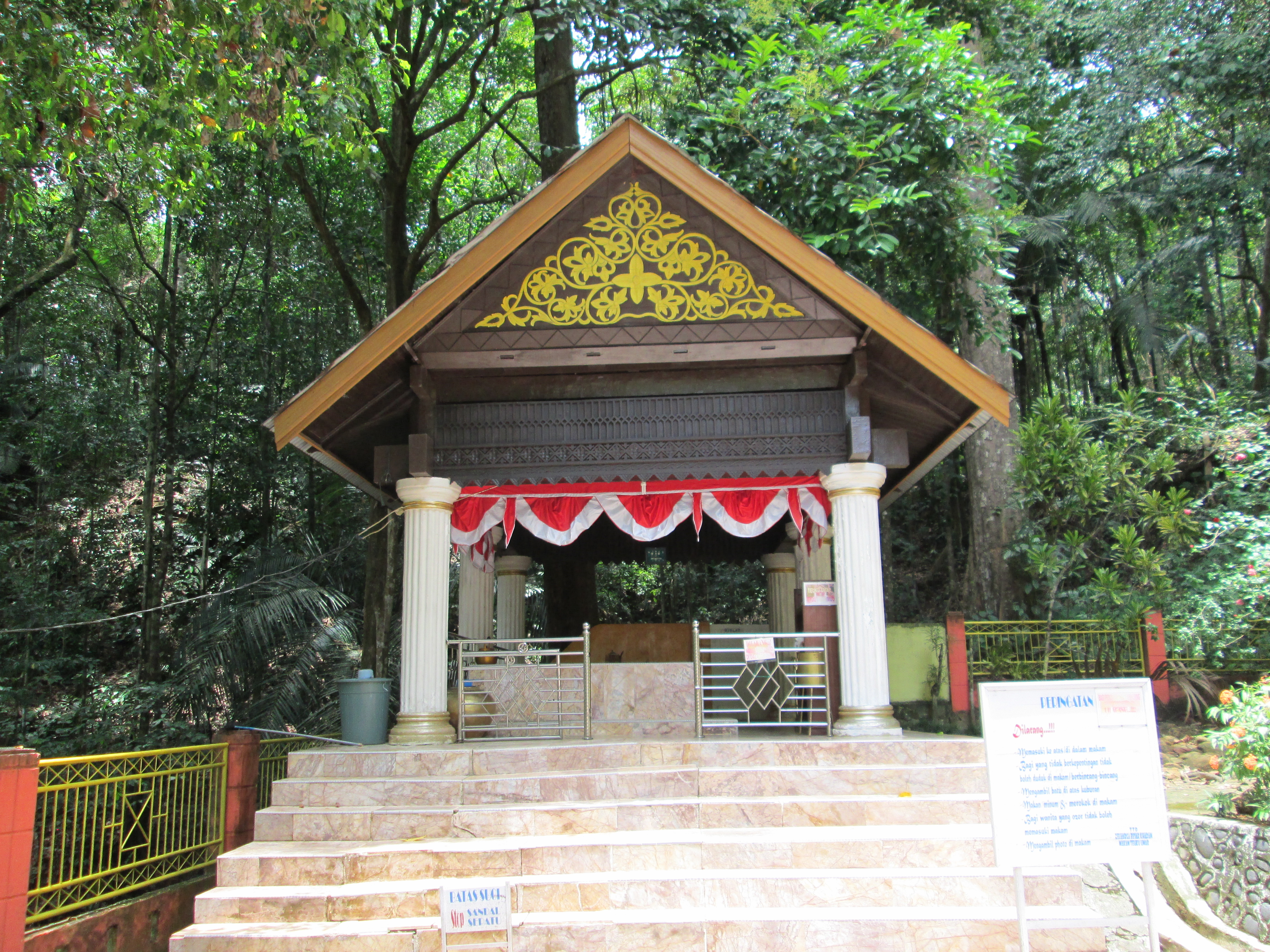
Teuku Umar's tomb in Mugo Rayek, Panton Reu, West Aceh Regency

Umar joined the guerrilla forces in 1873 at the age of 19. At first, he fought in Meulaboh; he later expanded his operations to different parts of West Aceh.

At the age of 20, Umar married Nyak Sofia; not long after, he took Nyak Malighai as his second wife. In 1880, Umar married his cousin Cut Nyak Dhien; Dhien later joined him in the guerrilla campaign.

In 1883, the Dutch colonial government signed a peace treaty with the Acehnese guerrillas. That same year Umar joined them as an undercover operative over Dhien's complaints, working his way up through the colonial military's ranks. After war broke out again in 1884, Umar worked to stop the Acehnese people's struggle. For his service, on 1 January 1894, Umar was given the title Johan Pahlawan and control of a legion of 250 fully armed soldiers. Eventually, Umar was given control of 120 more troops as well as 17 lieutenants.

On 30 March 1896, Umar and his troops deserted, taking including 800 weapons, 25,000 bullets, 500 kilograms (1,100 lb) of ammunition, and 18,000 dollars. Together with 400 soldiers under the command of Teuku Panglima Polem Muhammad Daud, Umar attacked the Dutch forces, killing 25 and injuring 190.

In retaliation, the Dutch governor sent soldiers en masse to capture or kill Umar. Umar was killed in an ambush on 11 February 1899, in Meulaboh.

== Legacy ==
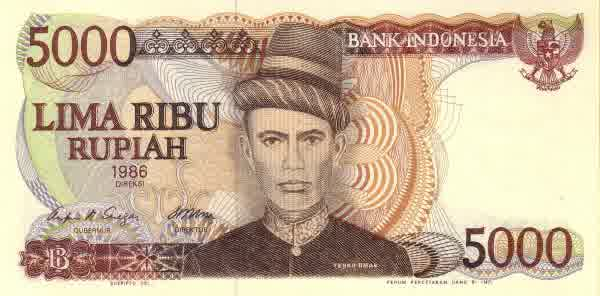
Teuku Umar featured on the 5,000-rupiah banknote.

In the 1930s, Sukarno described Teuku Umar as being one of the pahlawan tiga-sekawan (three heroic friends) along with Diponegoro and Imam Bonjol.

Teuku has been officially designated as national hero of Indonesia. There are many streets named after him throughout Indonesia, including a main thoroughfare in the well-known suburb of Menteng in Jakarta, as well as a field in Meulaboh.

== Bibliography ==
- Reid, Anthony (2005). An Indonesian Frontier: Acehnese & Other Histories of Sumatra. Singapore: Singapore University Press. pp. 187–88, 336. ISBN 9971-69-298-8.
- Barnard, Timothy P. (1997). "Local Heroes and National Consciousness: The Politics of Historiography in Riau". Bijdragen tot de Taal-, Land- en Volkenkunde, Riau in Transition. 153 (4): 509–526. doi:10.1163/22134379-90003912.
