= Baiturrahman Grand Mosque =

Mosque in Banda Aceh, Aceh, Indonesia

- Masjid Raya Baiturrahman مسجد راي بيت الرحمن; Meuseujid Raya Baiturrahman; Grote moskee van Baiturrahman
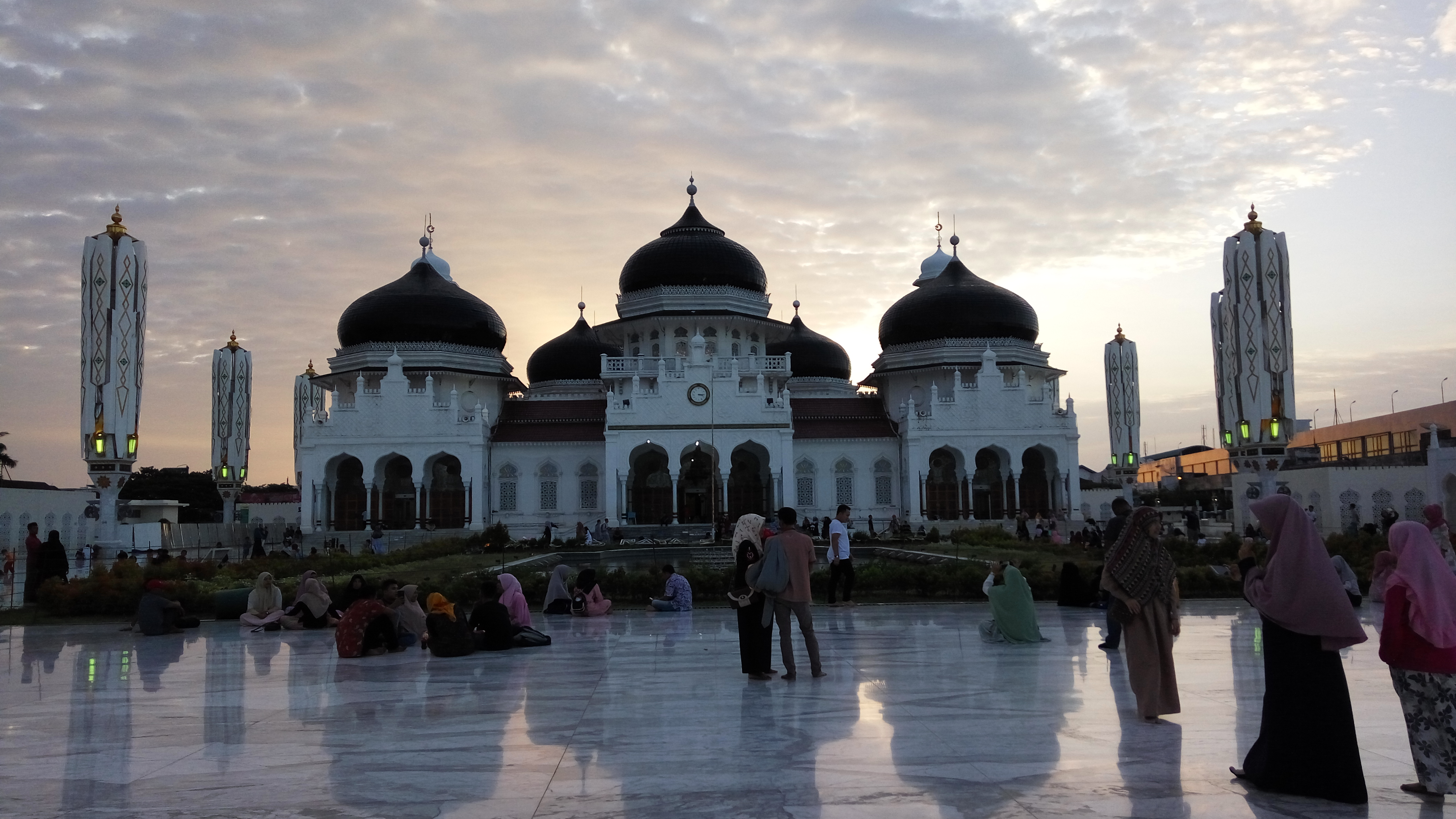

- Location in Aceh, Northern Sumatra, Sumatra and Indonesia Baiturrahman Grand Mosque (Northern Sumatra) Baiturrahman Grand Mosque (Sumatra) Baiturrahman Grand Mosque (Indonesia)

Religion
- Affiliation: Sunni Islam

Location
- Location: Banda Aceh, Indonesia
- Interactive map of Baiturrahman Grand Mosque
- Coordinates: 5°33′13″N 95°19′1.9″E

Architecture
- Architect: G. Bruins
- Type: Mosque
- Style: Mughal revivalism
- Groundbreaking: 1879
- Completed: 1881

Specifications
- Capacity: 30,000
- Interior area: 1,500 m^{2} (16,000 sq ft)
- Dome: 7 Domes
- Minaret: 8 Minarets

Baiturrahman Grand Mosque (Indonesian: Masjid Raya Baiturrahman; Acehnese: Meuseujid Raya Baiturrahman) is a mosque located in Banda Aceh, Aceh, Indonesia. The Baiturrahman Grand Mosque is a symbol of religion, culture, spirit, strength, struggle, and nationalism of the Acehnese people. The mosque is a landmark in Banda Aceh and has survived the 2004 Indian Ocean earthquake and tsunami.

== History ==
Original Baiturrahman mosque

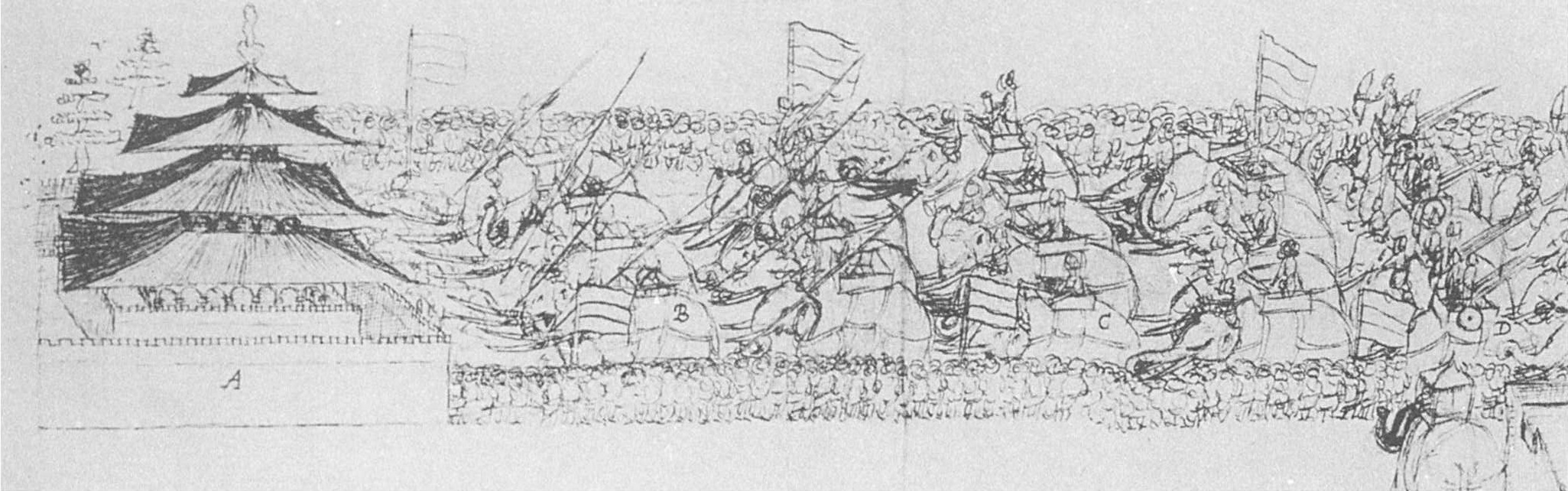
Procession of Eid al-Adha in Aceh, 1637

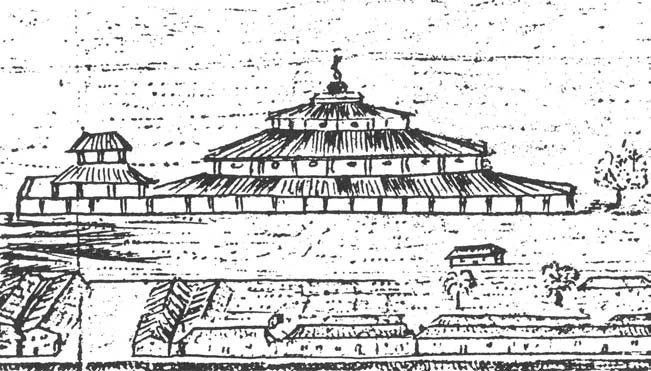
View of the great mosque of Aceh, about 1650

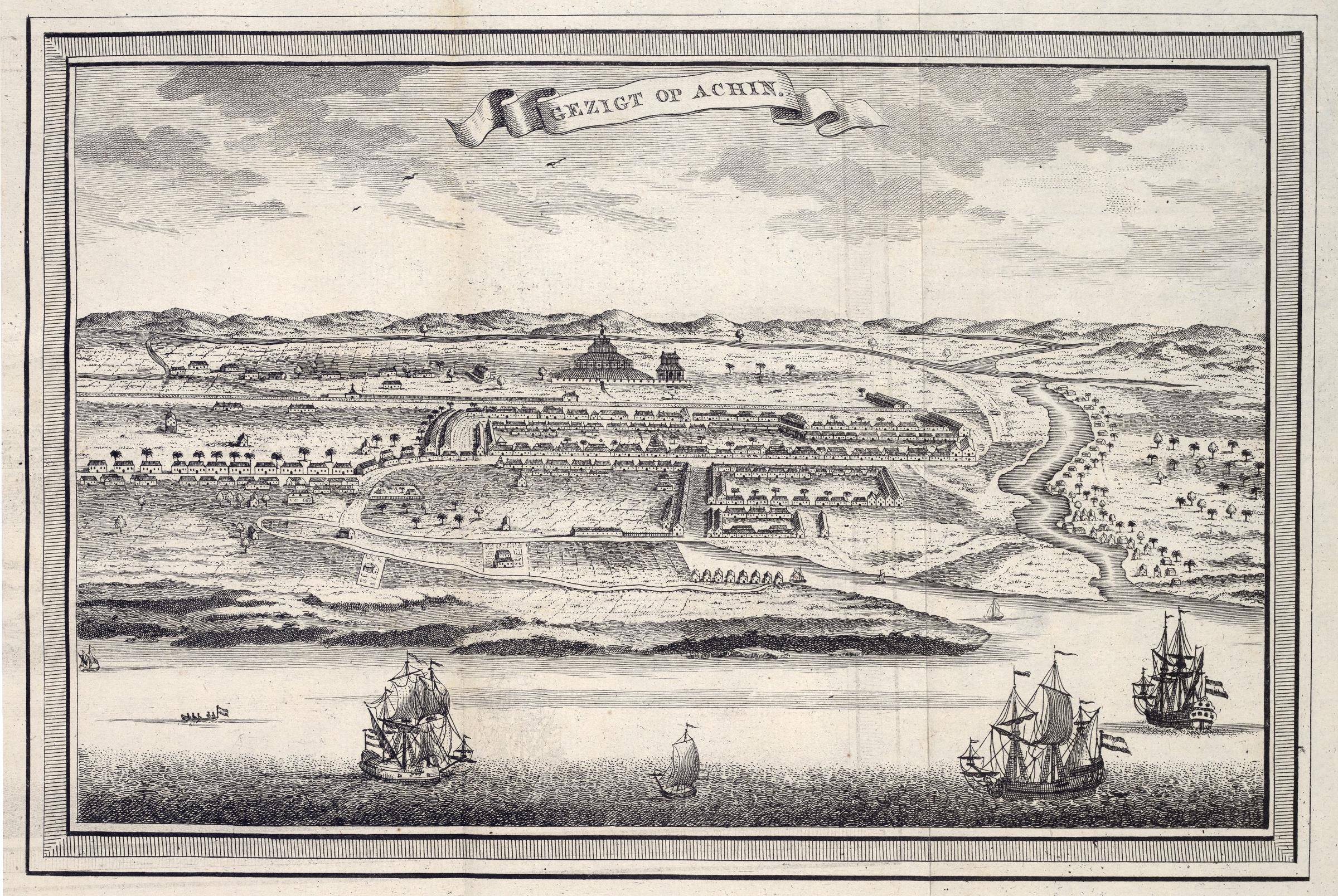
18th-century view of Banda Aceh

The original Masjid Raya ("Grand Mosque") was built in 1612 during the reign of Sultan Iskandar Muda. Some say the original mosque was built even earlier in 1292 by Sultan Alaidin Mahmudsyah. The original royal mosque featured a multi-tiered thatched roof, a typical feature of Acehnese architecture.

When the Colonial administration of the Dutch East Indies attacked the Kraton during the First Aceh Expedition on 10 April 1873, the Acehnese attacked the KNIL from the Baiturrahman Grand Mosque. From some flares shot onto the thatched roof, the mosque caught fire. General van Swieten promised the local rulers he would rebuild the mosque and create a warm place for mercy. In 1879, the Dutch rebuilt the Mosque Baiturrahman as a gift to, and to reduce the anger of, the Acehnese people. Construction only began in 1879, when the first stone was laid by Tengku Qadhi Malikul Adil, who became its first imam, and was completed on 27 December 1881 during the reign of Muhammad Daud Syah, the last sultan of Aceh. Many Acehnese initially refused to pray at Baiturrahman because it was built by the Dutch, whom they were warring against. Nowadays, however, it is a source of pride for Banda Aceh.

At first, the mosque featured only one dome and one minaret. More domes and minarets were added in 1935, 1958 and 1982. Today, the mosque has seven domes and eight minarets, including the highest in Banda Aceh.

The mosque survived the 2004 earthquake and tsunami with minor damages such as wall cracks. The earthquake had slightly tilted and cracked the 35-metre (115 ft) minaret by the main gate. During the disaster, the mosque served as a temporary shelter for displaced persons and only reopened for prayers after two weeks.

== Architecture and design ==
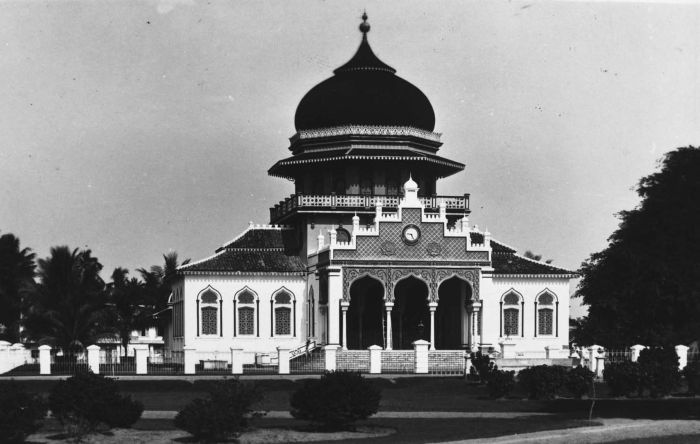
Before 1935, the new Baiturrahman Grand Mosque featured one dome and one minaret

The mosque was originally designed by the Dutch architect Gerrit Bruins. The design was subsequently adapted by L.P. Luijks, who also supervised the construction work done by contractor Lie A Sie. The design chosen is Mughal revival style, characterized by grand domes and minarets. The unique black domes are constructed from hard wood shingles combined as tiles.

The interior is decorated with relieved wall and pillars, marble staircase and floor from China, stained-glass windows from Belgium, well-decorated wooden doors, and ornate bronze chandeliers. The building stones are from the Netherlands. At the time of its completion, this new design presented a stark contrast compared to the original mosque to the extent that many Acehnese refused to pray in the mosque, because it was built by the Dutch "infidels". Today however, the mosque has become the pride of Banda Aceh.

As of present, the mosque has 7 domes, 8 minarets, and 32 pillars.

== Replica ==
A miniature of Baiturrahman Grand Mosque is featured in Minimundus miniature park, Austria.

== Traditions ==
A scene of the blessing of buffaloes at the end of the fasting month of Ramadan was captured by Dutch photographer Christiaan Benjamin Nieuwenhuis.

== Gallery ==
The interior, c. 1895

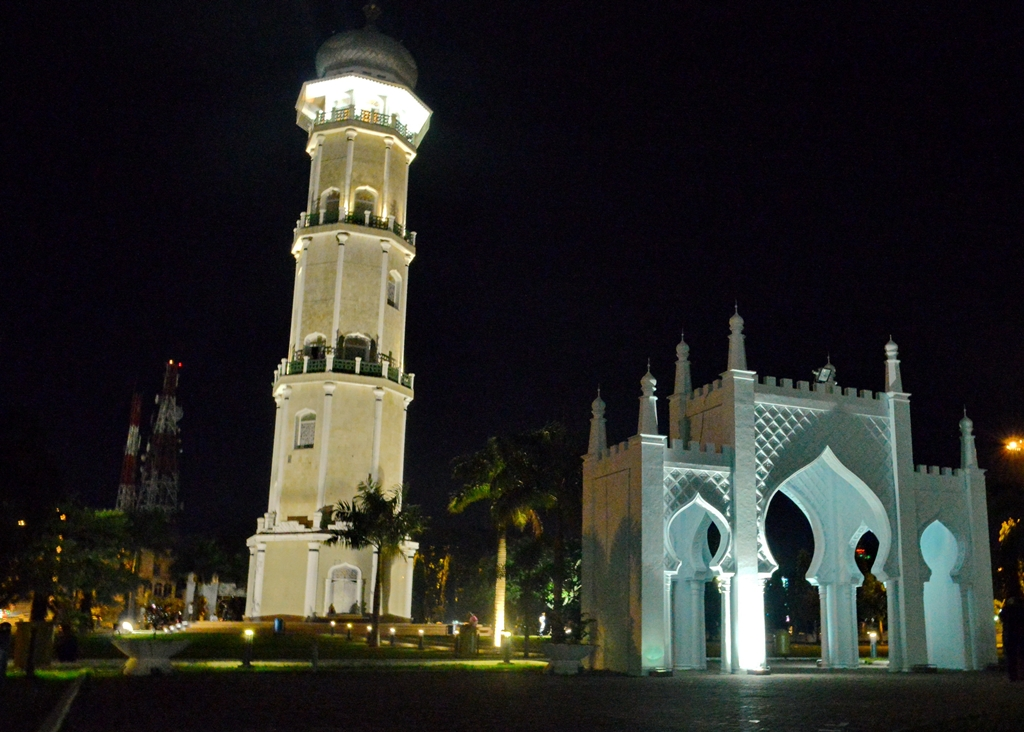
The main minaret, December 2014

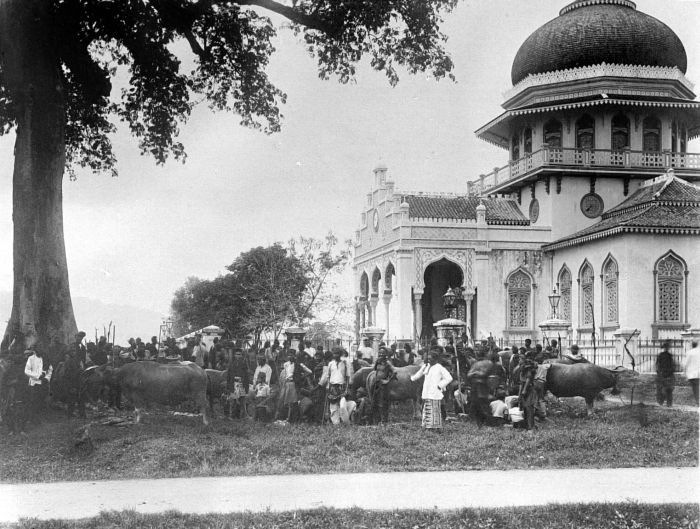
Blessing of buffaloes at the Baiturrahman mosque at the end of Ramadan

== See also ==
- Indonesian architecture
- Islamic architecture
- Islam in Indonesia
- List of mosques in Indonesia
