= First Aceh Expedition =

March – April 1873 Dutch campaign

- Part of Aceh War
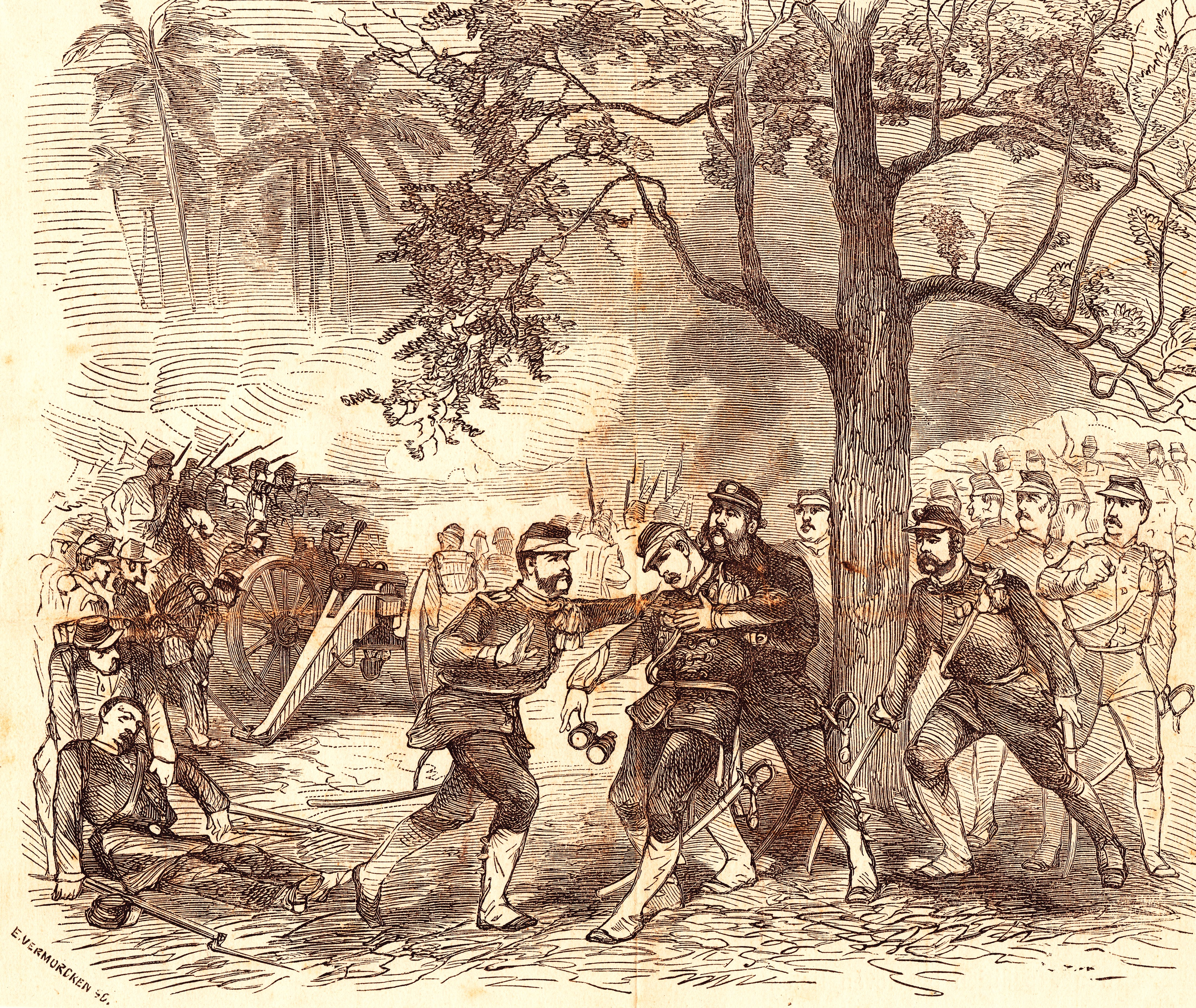
- General J.H.R. Köhler was killed in front of the Baiturrahman Grand Mosque.
| Date | 26 March 1873 – 25 April 1873 (4 weeks and 2 days) |
| Location | Sultanate of Aceh |
| Result | Acehnese victory |

Belligerents
| Dutch East Indies | Sultanate of Aceh |

Commanders and leaders
| J.H.R. Köhler † | Panglima Polim; Sultan Alauddin Mahmud Syah II |

The First Aceh Expedition was a military campaign undertaken by the Royal Netherlands East Indies Army (KNIL) against the Sultanate of Aceh in the north of Sumatra in 1873. The expedition was launched as a punitive measure by the Dutch colonial authorities in response to perceived challenges to their control over the region and Aceh's resistance to Dutch interference in its affairs.

The campaign resulted in an Aceh victory. However, it was costly for both sides, with significant loss of life on both sides and extensive destruction of Aceh's infrastructure and economy.

Early in 1873, the American Consul in Singapore had discussions with an Acehnese emissary about a possible Acehnese–American treaty, which the Dutch saw as justification for intervention. In March 1873, the Dutch bombed the Acehnese capital Banda Aceh (Kutaraja) and in April they landed 3,000 troops led by Johan Harmen Rudolf Köhler. Having misjudged their Acehnese opposition, the Dutch were forced to withdraw losing Köhler and eighty men. They then established a blockade and Acehnese troops (estimates of whom range from 10,000 to 100,000) prepared for battle.

This was followed by the Second Aceh Expedition in late 1873.

== See also ==
- History of Indonesia
- Second Aceh Expedition

== Sources ==
- Ricklefs, M. C. (1991). A History of Modern Indonesia Since c. 1300 (2nd ed.). Macmillan. ISBN 0-333-57689-6.
