= Second Aceh Expedition =

1873–74 Dutch campaign

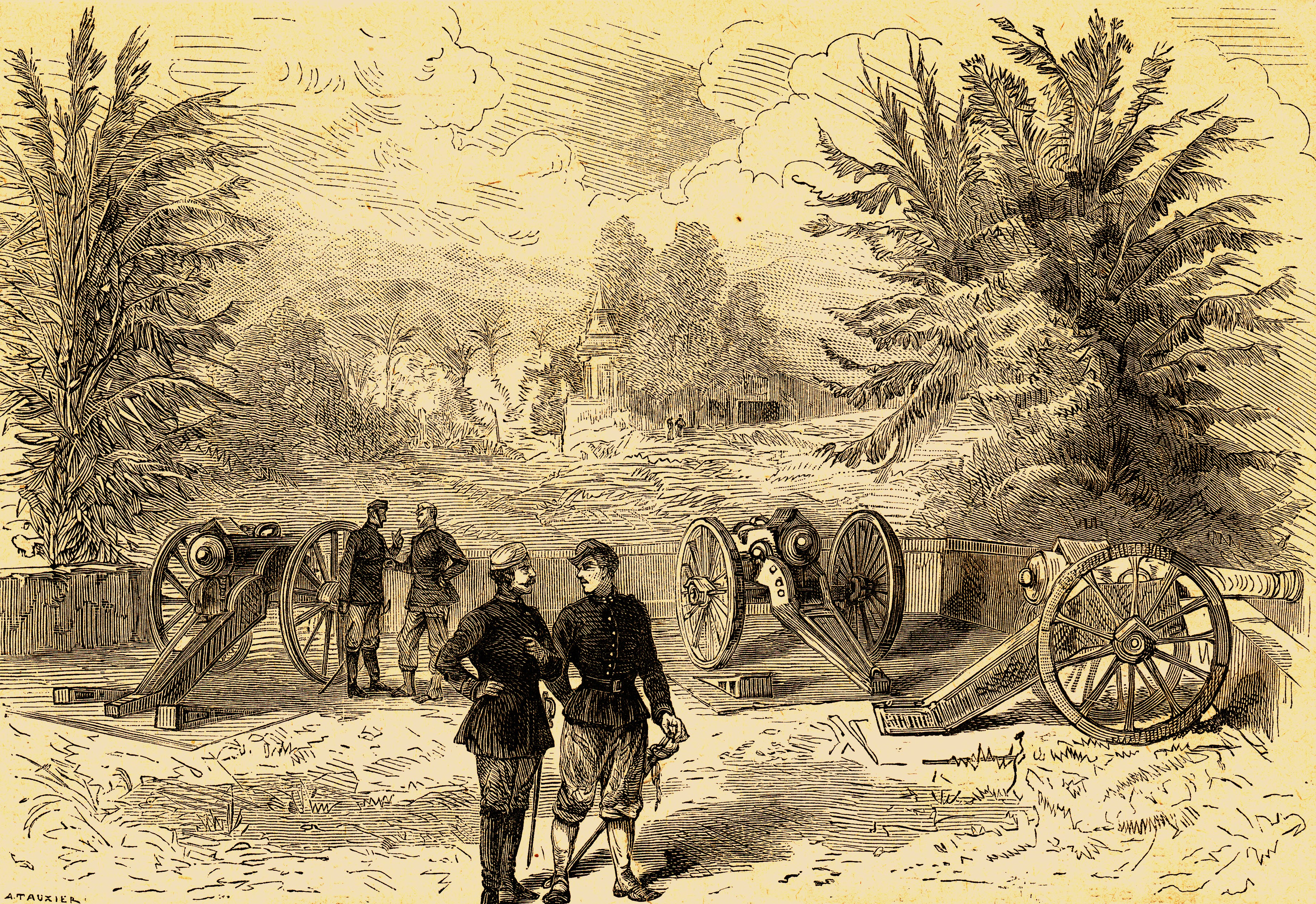
KNIL officers on guard at the Kraton in 1874

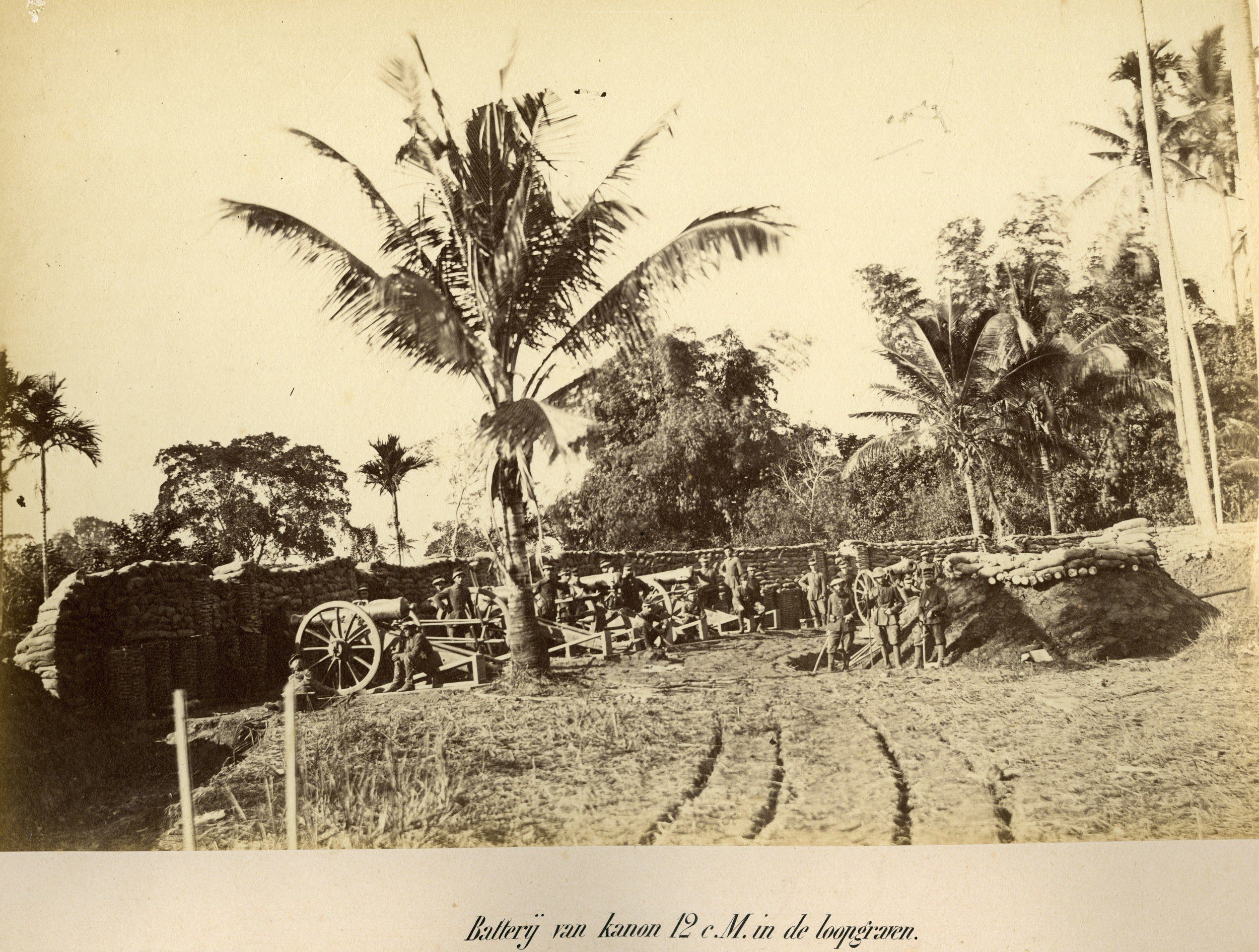
During the Second Aceh Expedition the KNIL fielded modern 12 cm guns.

The Dutch dispatched a second expedition in Aceh in late 1873 during the Aceh War following the failed First Aceh Expedition of the Royal Netherlands East Indies Army to Aceh.

At that time this expedition was one of the largest Dutch ever launched in the Indonesian archipelago, the expedition consisted of 8,500 troops, 4,500 servants and coolies, and a reserve of 1,500 troops was later added. Both the Dutch and Acehnese suffered from disease (mostly cholera) during this time. 1,400 colonial soldiers died between November 1873 and April 1874. After the Acehnese abandoned their capital, Banda Aceh, the Dutch moved into the capital in January 1874 thinking the Acehnese had surrendered and they had had won the war. They announced that the Aceh Sultanate was dissolved and that Aceh was annexed.

Foreign powers thus refrained from interference, however, Acehnese resistance remained. Sultan Mahmud Syah and his followers withdrew to the hills and jungles territory of Aceh, where Sultan Mahmud eventually died of cholera. The Acehnese proclaimed a young grandson of Tuanku Ibrahim, named Tuanku Muhammad Da'ud, as Alauddin Muhammad Da'ud Syah II (r. 1875–1903) and continued their struggle in the hills and jungles territory as guerrillas.
