= Christiaan Benjamin Nieuwenhuis =

Dutch photographer

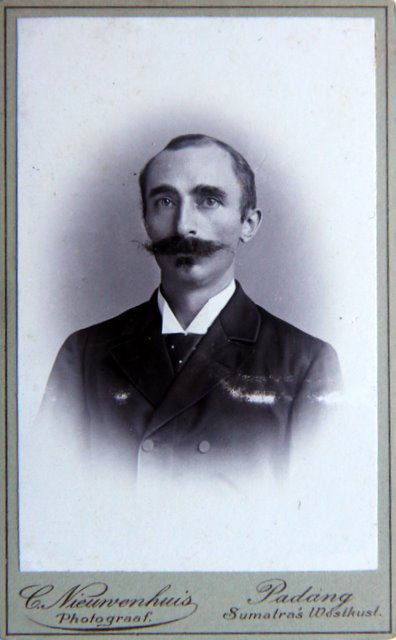
Christiaan Benjamin Nieuwenhuis

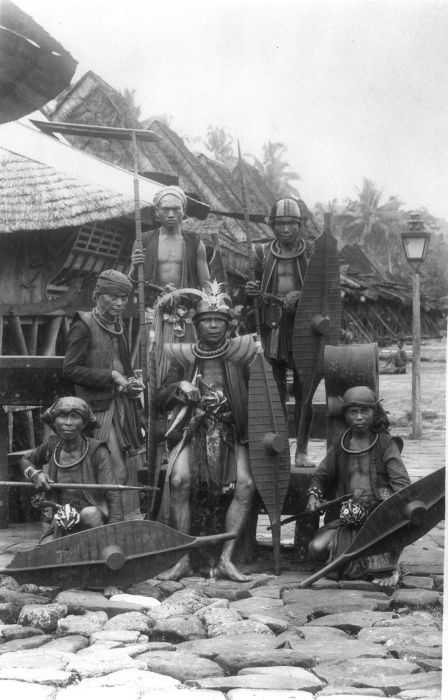
Group of warriors in South Nias

Christiaan Benjamin Nieuwenhuis (Dutch pronunciation: [ˈkrɪstijaːn ˈbɛɲɑmɪn ˈniuʋənɦœys]; born Niewenhuis; 4 July 1863 in Amsterdam – 20 April 1922 in Padang), often known as C.B. Nieuwenhuis, was a photographer in the Dutch East Indies.

He was born in Amsterdam in 1863. He volunteered for the militia in Batavia, Java in December 1883 for a six-year stint as a member of the Royal Military Band. In December 1889, he extended his contract for one more year.

He left the army in December 1890. In Batavia, he seemed to have worked at the Koene & Co. photo-studio and later left to Padang on West-Sumatra where he founded his own photo studio in February 1891. He died in Padang in April 1922.

== Gallery ==
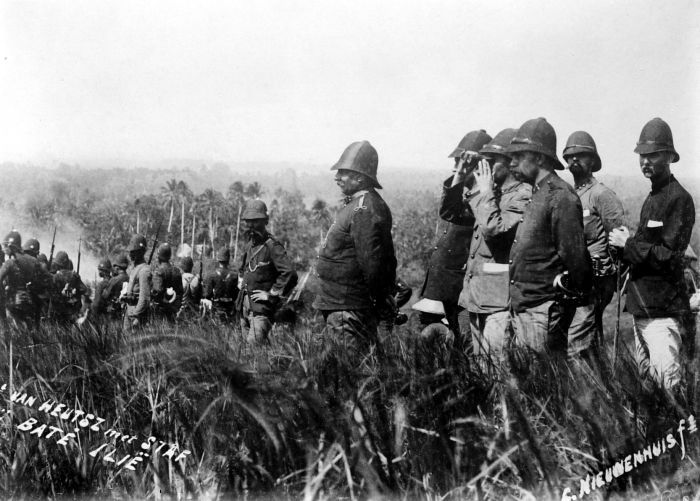
General van Heutz and staff in Bateë-iliëk

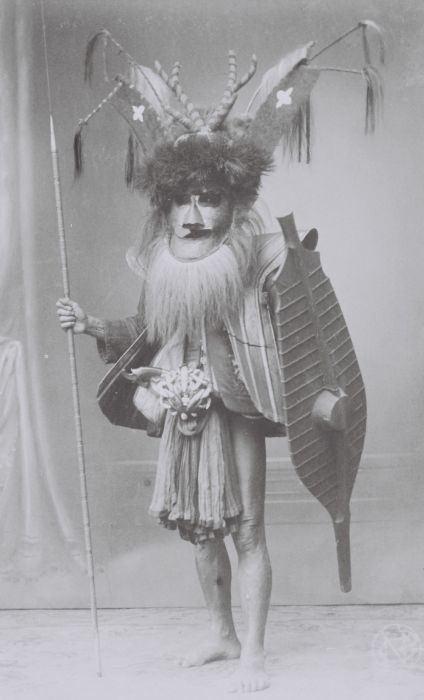

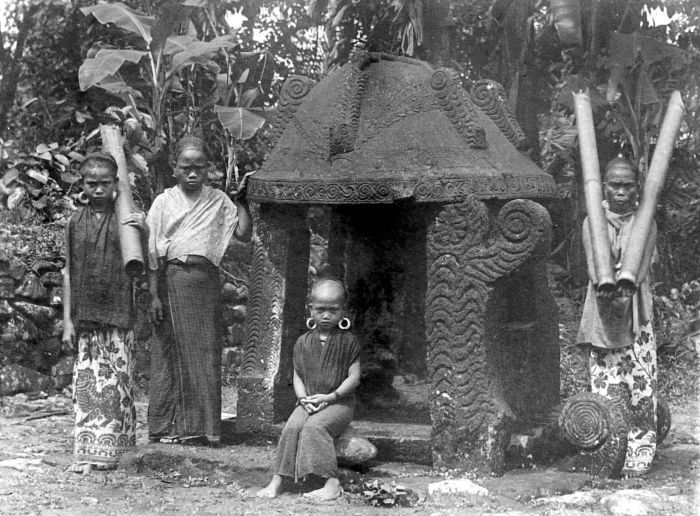
Girls at an offering house at the entrance of a kampong in South Nias

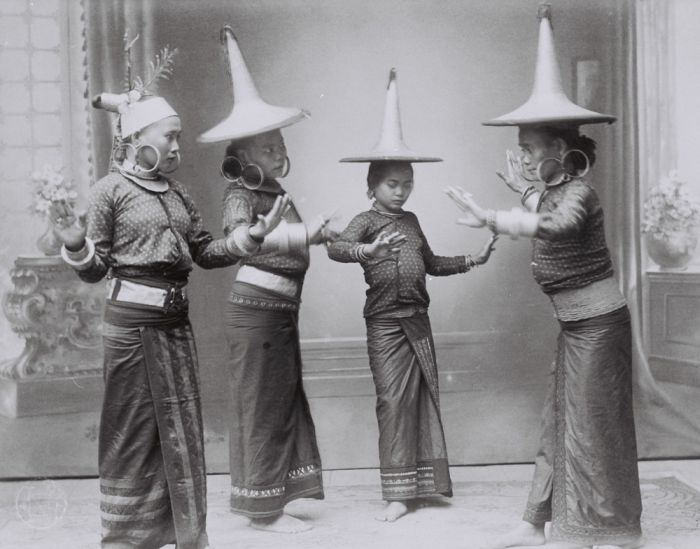
Female dancers

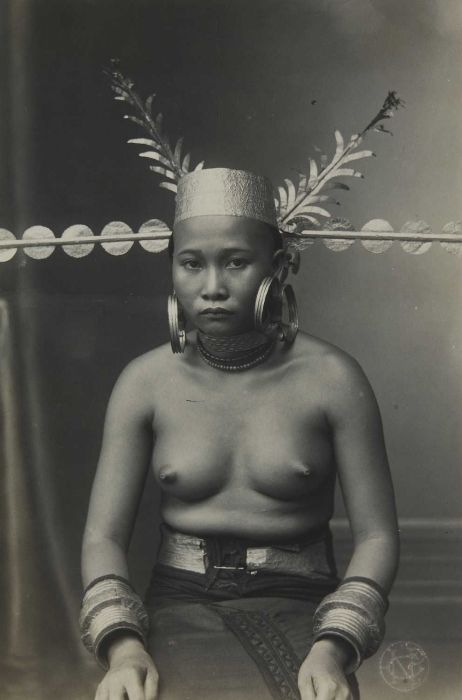

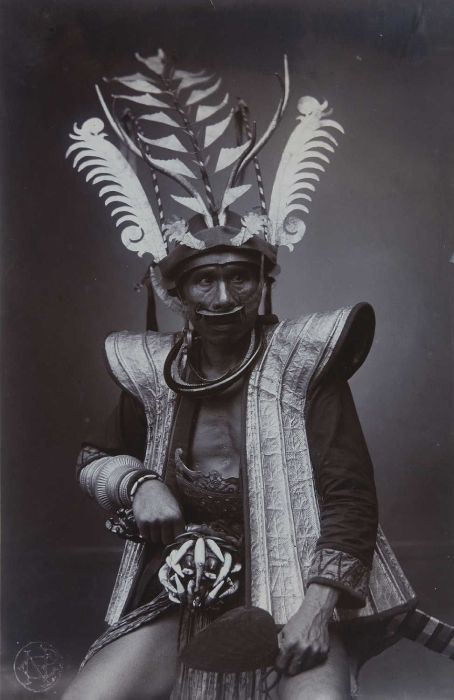
