= Jo van Heutsz =

Dutch military officer (1851–1924)

Joannes Benedictus van Heutsz
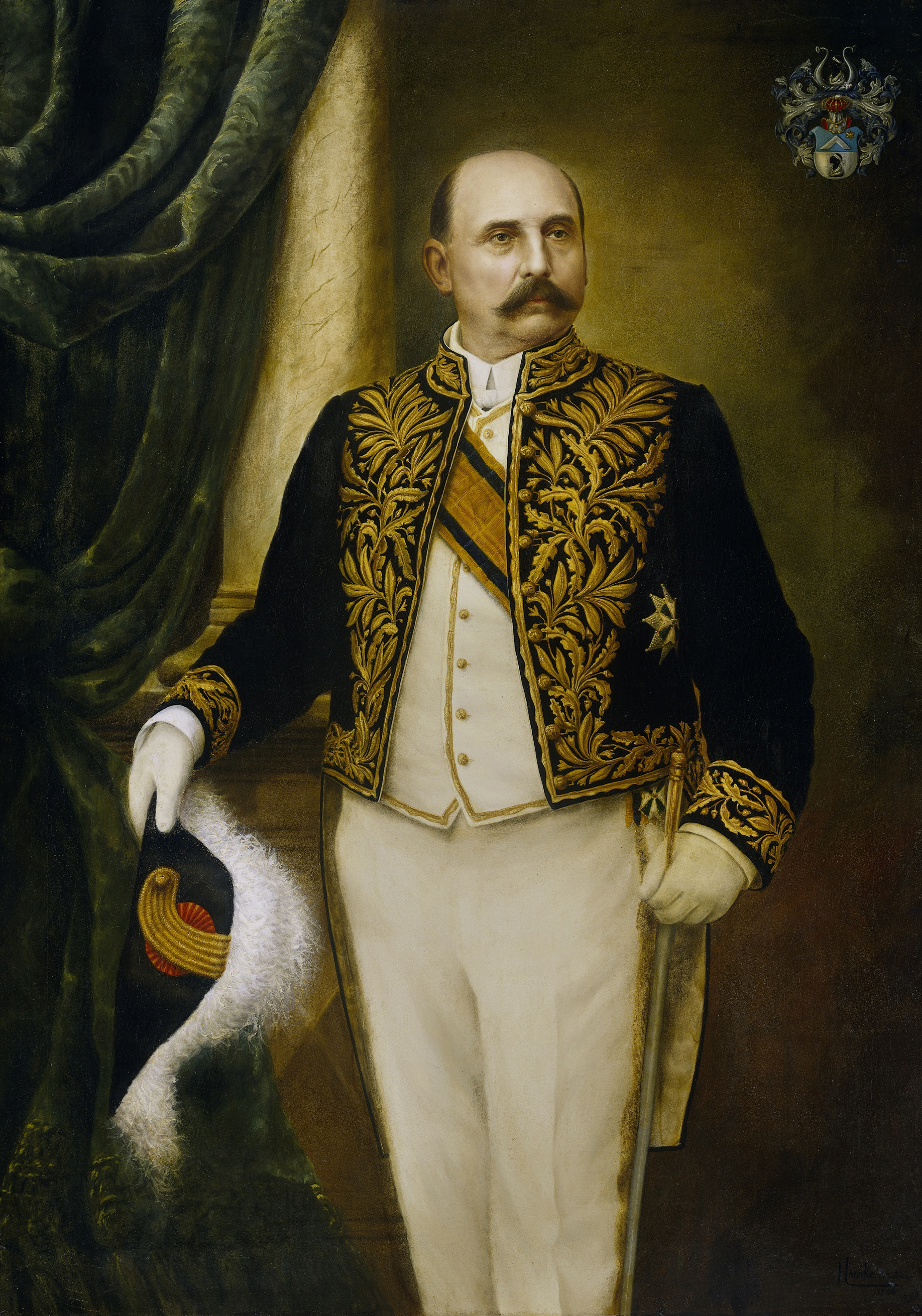
- Portrait of J. B. van Heutsz by Hannké (1908)
- Born: 3 February 1851; Coevorden, Drenthe, Netherlands
- Died: 11 July 1924 (aged 73); Montreux, Vaud, Switzerland
- Spouse: Maria Henriëtte van der Zwaan
- Children: 4
- Military career
- Allegiance: Dutch
- Nickname: "Pacificator of Aceh"
- Commands: Governor-general of the Dutch East Indies
- Conflicts: Aceh War

Joannes Benedictus "Jo" van Heutsz (Dutch pronunciation: [joːˈɑnəz beːnəˈdɪktʏs fɑn ˈɦøːts, ˈjoː vɑn ˈɦøːts]; 3 February 1851 – 11 July 1924) was a Dutch military officer who was appointed governor general of the Dutch East Indies in 1904, years after he had become famous for bringing to an end the long Aceh War.

== Early life and education ==
Joannes Benedictus van Heutsz was born on 3 February 1851, in Coevorden in the Netherlands. He was the second son of Joannes Franciscus van Heutsz and Maria Lucilla Kocken. Both his father and his grandfather were artillery officers.

Van Heutsz, who was a difficult and talkative student, went to school in Breda. His family could not afford to send him to the Royal Military Academy, in Breda, and so he later went to the Instruction Battalion in Kampen from 1867 to 1872.

== Aceh War ==
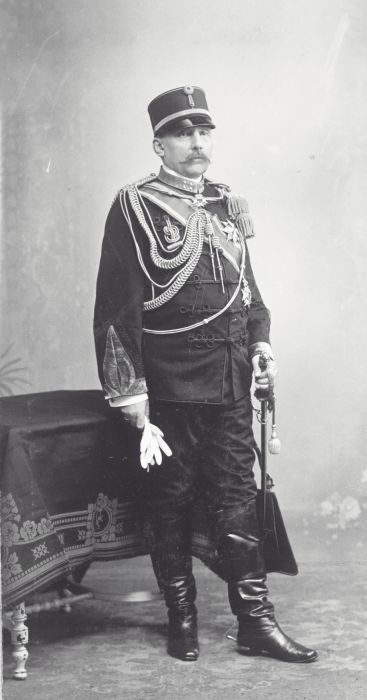
Lieutenant-General Van Heutsz in c. 1900

After 25 years of protracted warfare, van Heutsz was appointed as Military Governor of Aceh. In consort with the Islamic scholar Christiaan Snouck Hurgronje, van Heutsz succeeded in weakening the Acehnese resistance by exploiting tensions between the Acehnese aristocracy and the religious ulama. He also solicited the support of the Acehnese ruling classes and isolated the rebels from their rural bases. On the advice of an Acehnese noble, he also altered the tactics of the Royal Dutch East Indies Army by introducing small mobile forces, which were successful against the Acehnese guerrilla tactics.

Van Heutsz commissioned Colonel Gotfried Coenraad Ernst van Daalen with the challenge of breaking any remaining resistance. Van Daalen destroyed several villages, killing at least 2,900 Acehnese, among whom were 1,150 women and children. Dutch losses numbered just 26, and van Daalen was promoted.

By 1903, van Heutsz's tactics had succeeded in convincing several secular Acehnese resistance leaders, including Sultan Muhammad Daud, Tuanku Raja Keumala, Tuanku Mahmud and Teuku Panglima Polem Muda Perkasa, to surrender to the colonial authorities. Having overcome the secular elements of the resistance, Aceh was declared by the Dutch to be officially pacified by 1903. However, resistance from the ulama continued until 1913.

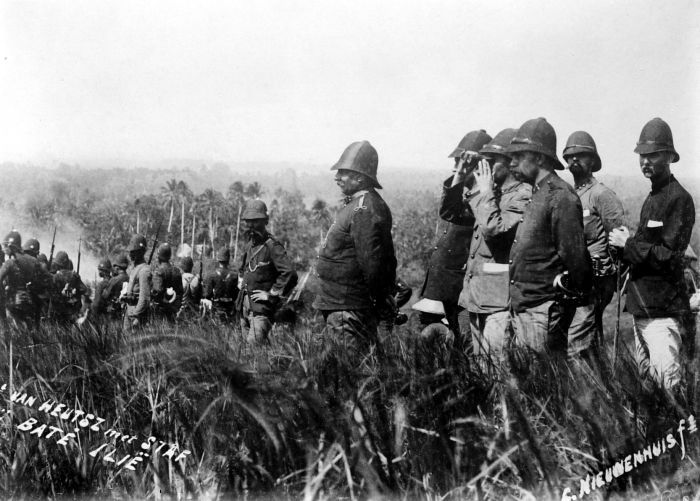
Lieutenant General van Heutsz with his staff during the attack on Batèë Iliëk, 12 March 1901

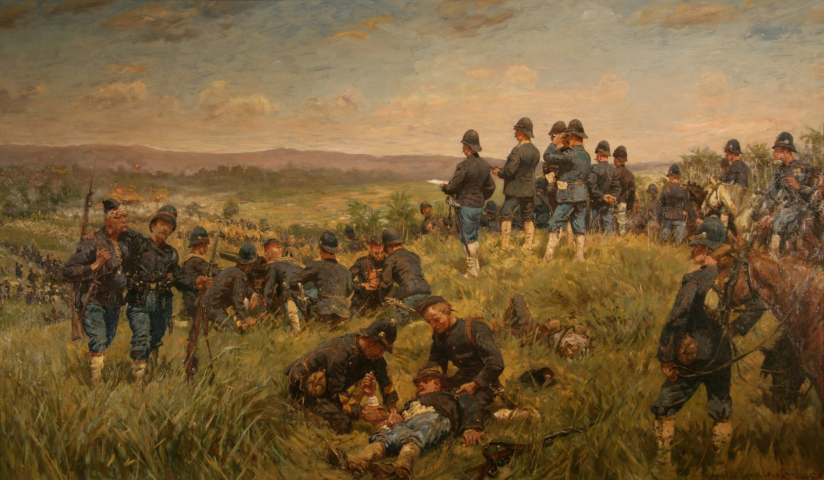
Attack on Batèë Iliëk in 1901, by Jan Hoynck van Papendrecht

Hendrikus Colijn, a future Dutch prime minister, was the adjutant of van Heutsz. In the Netherlands, van Heutsz was then considered a hero, named as the "Pacificator of Aceh" and was promoted to the position of Governor-General in 1904. His efforts boosted support for imperialism in Dutch society and government and weakened the position of the anti-imperialists.

== Return to Europe ==
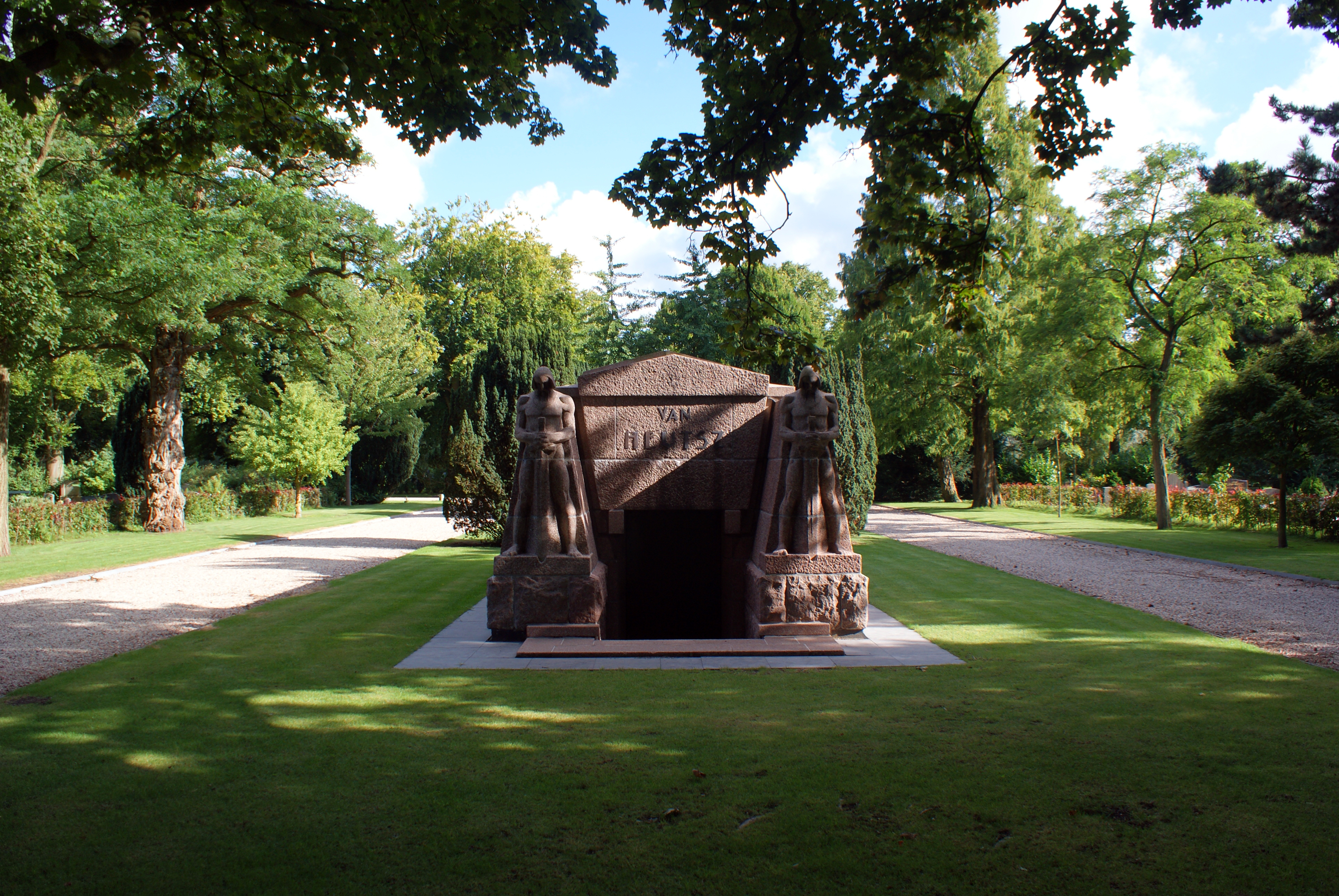
Tomb of Joannes Benedictus van Heutsz at the Nieuwe Ooster Begraafplaats in Amsterdam

Van Heutsz moved to Amsterdam in 1909. After his wife died in 1919, he moved to Bussum. He lived in Montreux, Switzerland, and Merano, in Italy, from 1922. He died in Montreux on 11 July 1924 at the age of 73. On 9 June 1929, he was reburied in Amsterdam.

== Legacy ==
=== Monument ===
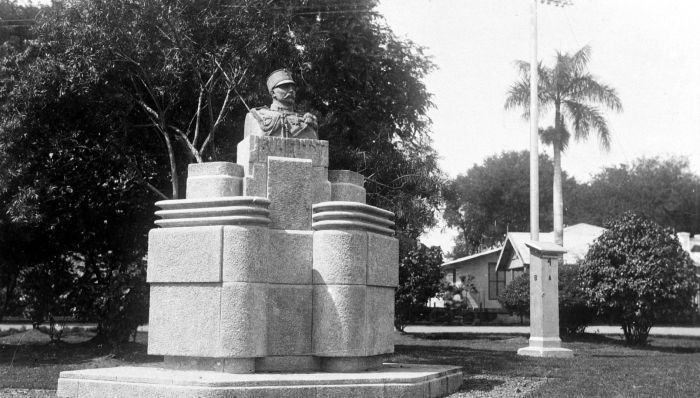
Monument in Koetaradja.

During the 1920s and the 1930s, monuments to Van Heutsz were erected throughout major cities of the Netherlands and the Dutch East Indies, including Amsterdam, Banda Aceh and Batavia (later Jakarta). On 15 June 1935, the Van Heutsz Monument in South Amsterdam (Amsterdam-Zuid) was inaugurated by Queen Wilhelmina. The monument underwent many defacements several times during various protests from 1965 to 2004. The municipality of Amsterdam changed its name and purpose in 2004. The monument is now known as the Dutch East India – Netherlands Monument (Monument Indië-Nederland), and all references to van Heutsz have been removed.

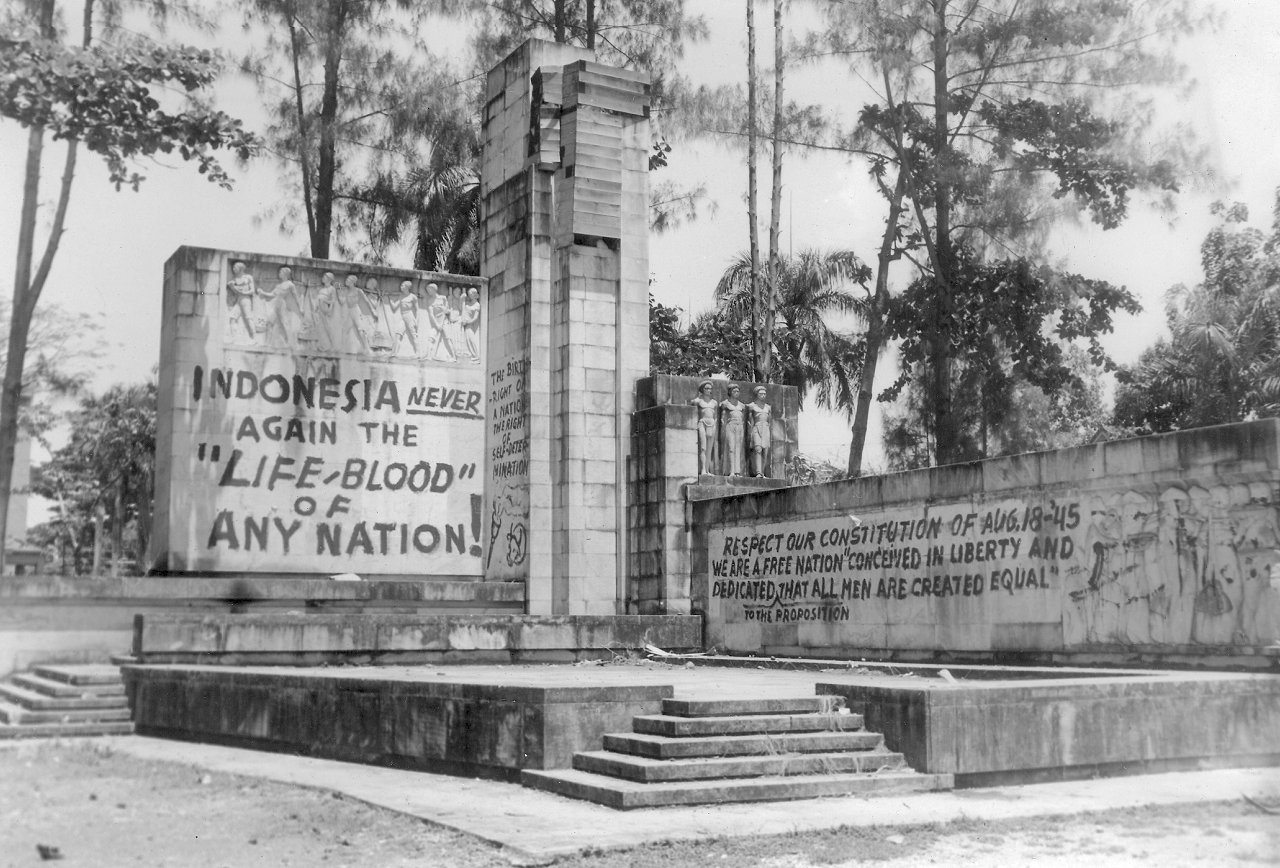
Jakarta, October 1945: Nationalist slogans on the van Heutsz monument.

The monument in Jakarta, designed by the architect Wilhelm Marinus Dudok and the sculptor Hendrik van den Eynde, was inaugurated in 1932. In 1935, the leader of the Dutch fascist NSB, Anton Mussert, visited Jakarta and laid a wreath in van Heutsz honour. After the Second World War, the monument was covered in slogans demanding independence and was demolished in 1953.

In Coevorden, his birthplace, the main city park and main street are (still) called the Van Heutsz Park and Van Heutszsingel, respectively.

=== Regiment van Heutsz ===
After the departure of the Dutch from independent Indonesia in 1949, the Regiment van Heutsz of the Dutch Army was created with the specific aim of being "the bearer of the traditions of KNIL", the former Dutch Indies colonial army that had carried out the Aceh War.

== Awards and decorations ==
- Kraton Medal
- Knight First Class of the Military Order of William (1876)
- Honorary Sabre participants for their bravery (26 June 1890)
- Commander of the Military Order of William (1899)
- Knight of the Order of the Dutch Lion (1899)
- Grand Officer of the Military Order of William (1901)
- Grand Cross of the Military Order of William (1903)
- Grand Officer of the Order of Orange-Nassau
- Grand Cross of the Order of the Dutch Lion (4 December 1919)
- Expedition Cross with two clasps
- Long Service Medal for Officers
- Grand Cross of the Order of the Red Eagle

== Notes ==
Political offices
| Preceded by Willem Rooseboom | Governor-General of the Dutch East Indies; 1904–1909 | Succeeded by Alexander Willem Frederik Idenburg |
