= Jan Hoynck van Papendrecht =

Dutch painter and illustrator (1958–1933)

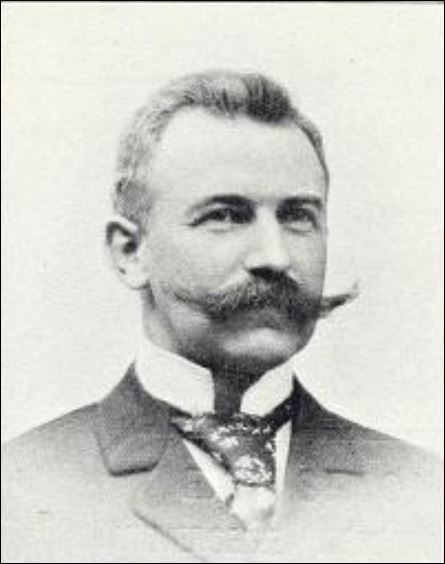
- Hoynck van Papendrecht in 1904
- Born: 18 September 1858; Amsterdam, Netherlands
- Died: 11 December 1933 (aged 75); The Hague, Netherlands
- Education: Royal Academy of Fine Arts, Antwerp
- Known for: Military art

Jan Hoynck van Papendrecht (18 September 1858 – 11 December 1933) was a Dutch painter and illustrator who specialised in military art.

== Life ==
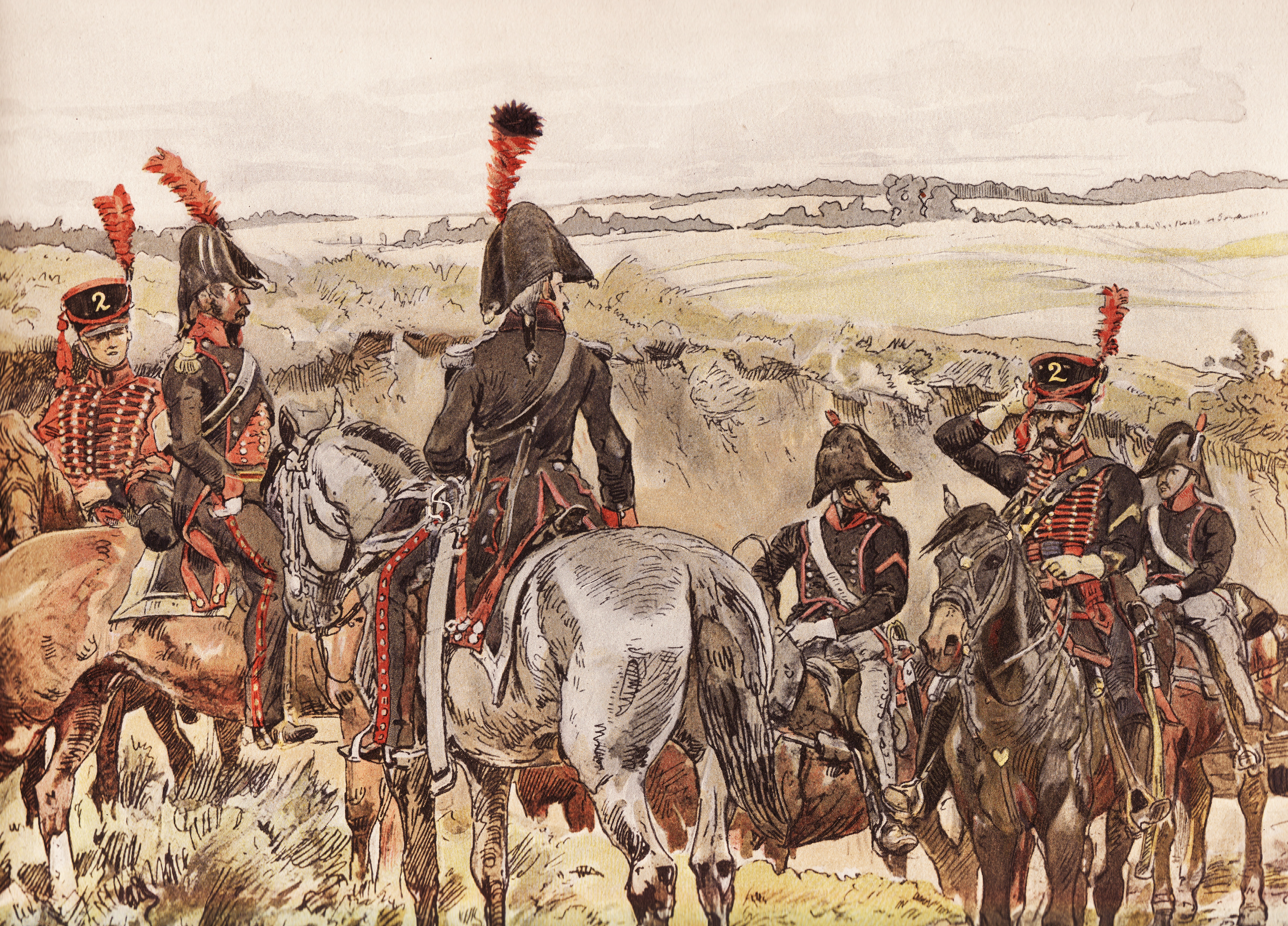
Horse artillery in 1808. Watercolour by Hoynck van Papendrecht (1900).

The artist's father, John Cornelis Hoynck van Papendrecht, was an accomplished student of drawing and painting, a skill that manifested itself in him from an early age. He completed his studies at the Amsterdam Handelsschool at commerce. At the urging of Charles Rochussen, a friend of his father's and a doyen of Dutch art, joined the winter programme at the Royal Academy of Fine Arts in Antwerp. After two years in Antwerp, Van Papendrecht lived in Munich for four years to continue his training.

In 1884, Van Papendrecht returned to Amsterdam. In 1889, he married a clergyman's daughter, Johanna Philippa van Gorkom. In 1892, the couple moved to Amstelveen and then to Rheden near Arnhem where they remained till 1902. The artist's final residence was in The Hague where he continued to live till his death in 1933.

== Career ==
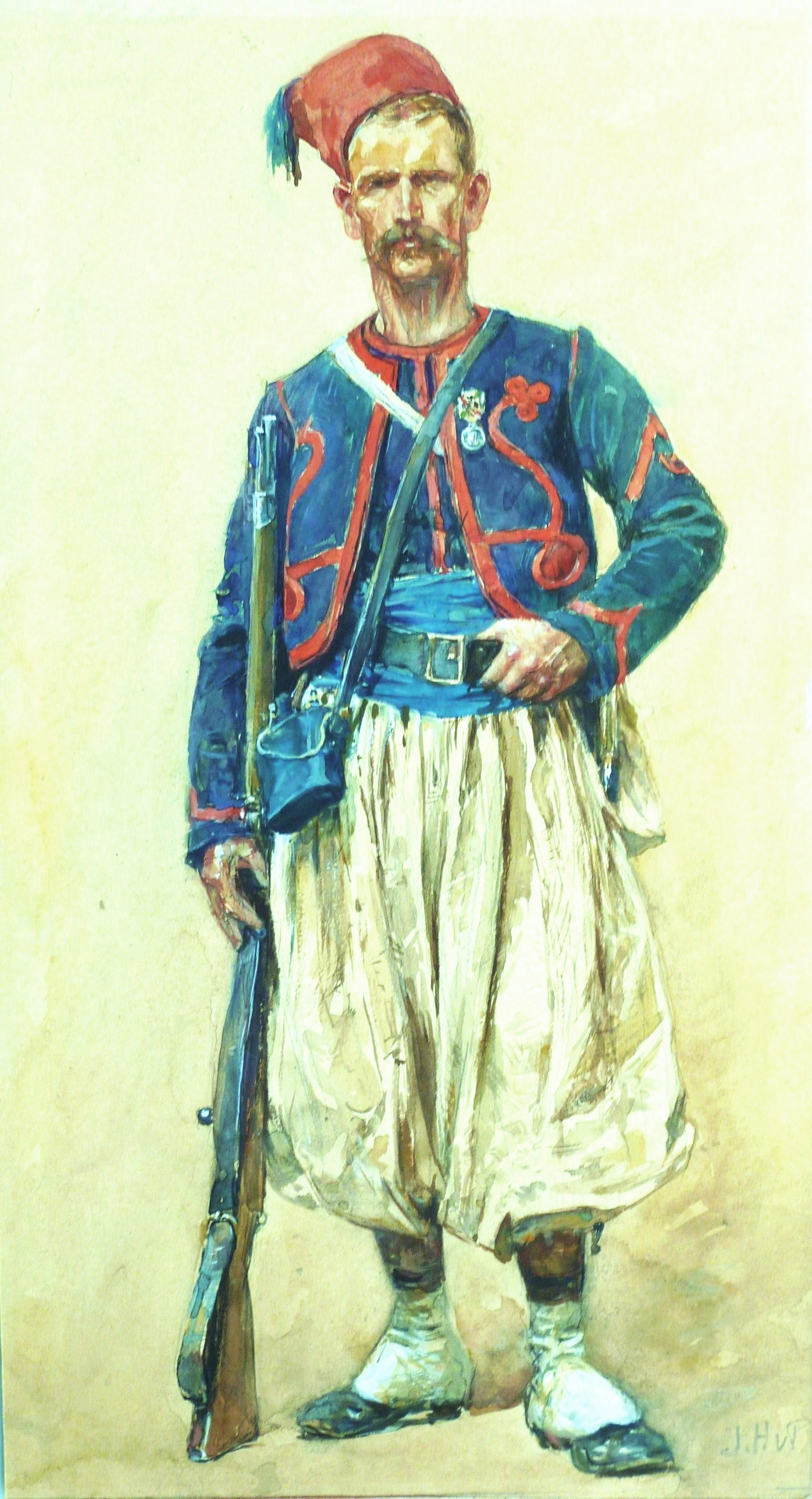
Franse Zouaaf. Watercolour by Hoynck van Papendrecht.

The total oeuvre of Van Papendrecht is impressive in quantity. In 1885, Van Papendrecht's drawings appeared in the popular illustrated magazine Eigen Haard. Five years later, he joined the editorial board of the Elsevier illustrated magazine. His fame as an illustrator was definitively established in 1893 following his contributions to a series of books that recorded the history of the Dutch Horse Artillery Corps (The Yellow Riders).

Besides being a gifted illustrator, Van Papendrecht was also a master of watercolour. Several hundred watercolours are extant in his name.

Jan Hoynck van Papendrecht's oil paintings were famous, especially after his participation in the 1884 Exhibition of Living Masters in Amsterdam, and garnered prestigious prizes. Some of his awards include:

- Willink van Collenprijs (1885)
- Bronze medal at the St Louis World Fair (1904)
- Silver medal for Art and Science of the House of Orange (1906)
- Silver medal at the fifth National Art Exhibition (1907)
- Honourable mention at the Salon de Paris (1907)
- Gold medal at Munich (1909).

Hoynck van Papendrecht was created a Knight of the Order of Orange-Nassau on his seventieth birthday. He was a fellow of the Arti et Amicitiae society, as well as the Pulchri Studio.

=== Military Art ===
Hoynck van Papendrecht's major fame stemmed from his vibrant paintings of military life. Until well into the 19th century, ideas of patriotism and military heroism played a major role in Dutch military art, and Van Papendrecht was attracted to army scenes from early in his career. Leading painters of this innovative direction in the patriotic painting were the young painters George Hendrik Breitner and Isaac Israëls, but especially Hoynck van Papendrecht. In 1875, he created romanticised heroic paintings based on the Battle of Waterloo (1815) and the Belgian Revolution (1830-1839). Along with his teacher Charles Rochussen, he collaborated with the officers Willem Constantijn Staring and Nicolaas van Es to create realistic illustrations for newsmagazines such as Elsevier and Eigen Haard, thereby vastly increasing the audience for military art.

=== Landscapes and Portraiture ===
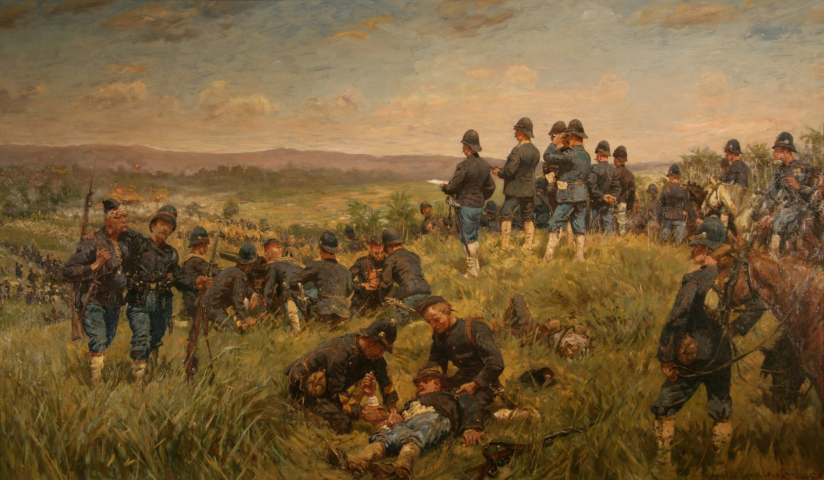
Joannes Benedictus van Heutsz with his staff during the attack on Bateë-iliëk in 1901

Alongside his interest in military art, Hoynck van Papendrecht was deeply involved in landscape painting as well as portraiture. Owing to his careful study of his subjects and an acute eye for detail, his works are often treated as historical sources of information. He was recruited by the British art weekly The Graphic to make sketches of delegates to the Hague Conventions, in addition to the portraits of soldiers that he already published in it.

In 1900, the famous book The Uniforms of the Dutch Navy and Army appeared in two parts, in which many of the illustrations were contributed by Van Papendrecht.
