= Christiaan Snouck Hurgronje =

Dutch Orientalist (1857–1936)

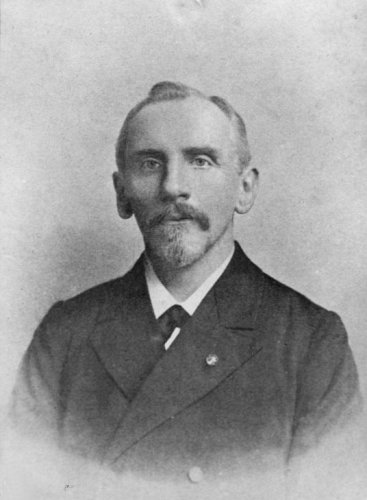
- Dutch scholar Snouck Hurgronje.
- Born: 8 February 1857; Oosterhout, Netherlands
- Died: 26 June 1936 (aged 79); Leiden, Netherlands
- Occupations: Professor, author, spy, colonial advisor

Christiaan Snouck Hurgronje (Dutch pronunciation: [ˈkrɪstijaːn ˈsnuk ɦʏrˈɣrɔɲə]; 8 February 1857 – 26 June 1936) was a Dutch scholar of Oriental cultures and languages and advisor on native affairs to the colonial government of the Dutch East Indies.

Born in Oosterhout in 1857, he became a theology student at Leiden University in 1874. He received his doctorate at Leiden in 1880 with his dissertation 'Het Mekkaansche Feest' ("The Festivities of Mecca"). He became a professor at the Leiden School for Colonial Civil Servants in 1881.

Snouck, who was fluent in Arabic, through mediation with the Ottoman governor in Jeddah, was examined by a delegation of scholars from Mecca in 1884 and, upon successfully completion of the examination, was allowed to commence a pilgrimage to the Holy Muslim city of Mecca in 1885. He was one of the first Western scholars of Oriental cultures to do so.

A pioneering traveler, he was a rare Western presence in Mecca, but embraced the culture and religion of his hosts with passion in such that he successfully gave people the impression that he had converted to Islam. He admitted that he pretended to be a Muslim as he explained in a letter sent to his college friend, Carl Bezold on 18 February 1886 which is now archived in Heidelberg University Library. In 1888 he became member of the Royal Netherlands Academy of Arts and Sciences.

In 1889 he became professor of Malay at Leiden University and official advisor to the Dutch government on colonial affairs. He wrote more than 1,400 papers on the situation in Atjeh and the position of Islam in the Dutch East Indies, as well as on the colonial civil service and nationalism.

As the adviser of J. B. van Heutsz, he took an active role in the final part (1898–1905) of the Aceh War (1873–1914). He used his knowledge of Islamic culture to devise strategies which significantly helped crush the resistance of the Aceh inhabitants and impose Dutch colonial rule on them, ending a 40-year war with varying casualty estimates of between 50,000 and 100,000 inhabitants dead and about a million wounded.

His success in the Aceh War earned him influence in shaping colonial administration policy throughout the rest of the Dutch East Indies. However, deeming his advice insufficiently implemented he returned to the Netherlands in 1906. Back in the Netherlands Snouck continued a successful academic career.

== Background ==
When the colony of the Dutch East Indies (now: Indonesia) was founded in 1800, the dominant monotheistic religion of most of the indigenous peoples of the Indies Archipelago was Islam. Due to strong religious syncretism this form of Islam mixed with elements from older religious beliefs. Arab merchants and Indigenous haji pilgrims returning from Mecca, increasingly advocated a more orthodox interpretation of Islam. This led to the rise of the strict 'santri' variant of Islam. The nominal Muslims were called "abangan".

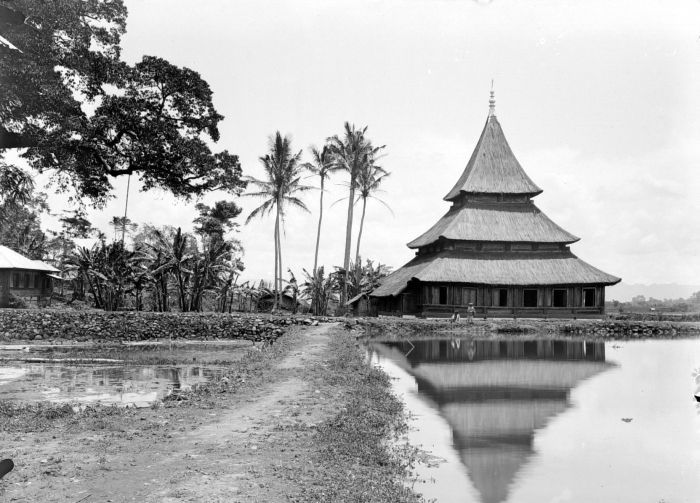
Mosque in the Dutch East Indies, 1900.

Most Christian churches adhered to the guidelines set by the colonial government. The Protestant and Catholic mission showed due diligence in following government strategy, but nevertheless enjoyed considerable autonomy. Moreover, Dutch colonialism was never grounded in religious zealotry. However, during the 19th century Christian missionaries became increasingly active, regularly leading to clashes or frictions, between Christianity and Islam and between the different Christian denominations.

The relationship between the government and Islam was uncomfortable. The Dutch colonial power used the principle of separation of church and state and wanted to remain neutral in religious matters. Nonetheless, equally important was the desire to maintain peace and order and Islam was an early source of inspiration to revolt against the colonial administration. Social and political motives intertwined with religious desires repeatedly exploded into riots and wars like the Padri War (1821–1837) and Aceh War (1873–1914) in Sumatra.

== Life in the Dutch East Indies ==
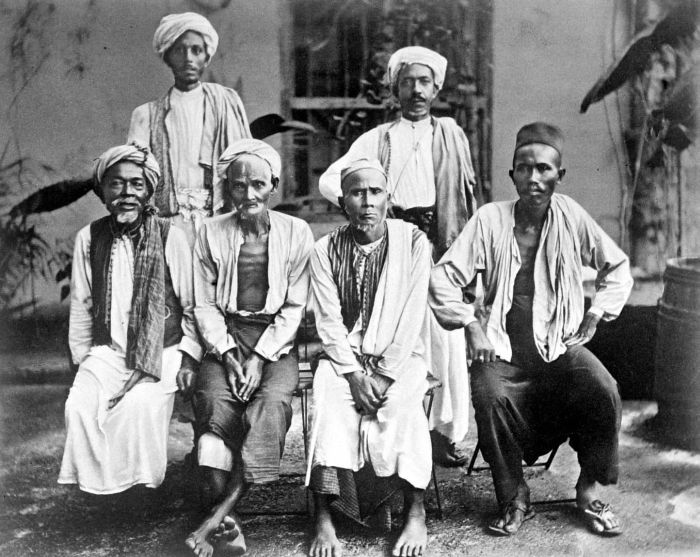
Pilgrims from Aceh on their way to Mecca. Picture taken by Snouck Hurgronje in the Dutch Consulate in Jeddah, 1884.

As of 1871, the colonial governor-general relied on an 'advisor for indigenous affairs' to manage these tensions. Due to his expertise in Arabic and Islam, Prof.Dr. Snouck Hurgronje served in this capacity between 1889 and 1905. His overall advice was to intervene as little as possible in religious affairs and allow optimal freedom of religion. Only manifestations of political Islam were to be countered. Although his advice was implemented and guided colonial policy for years to come, the emergence of Sarekat Islam in 1912 gave rise to the first East Indies political party based on Islamic principles.

Aspiring to reform Dutch colonial policies, Snouck moved to the Dutch East Indies in 1889. Snouck was originally appointed as researcher of Islamic education in Buitenzorg and professor of Arabic in Batavia in 1890. Although at first he was not allowed to visit Aceh on Sumatra, he rejected offers to return to Europe from the University of Leiden and Cambridge University. In 1890 he married the daughter of an indigenous nobleman in Ciamis, West Java. Due to the controversy this caused in the Netherlands, Snouck called the marriage a "scientific opportunity" to study and analyse Islamic wedding ceremonies. Four children were born from this marriage.

Between 1891 and 1892, Snouck—who was by now fluent in Acehnese, Malay and Javanese—finally traveled to Aceh, which was devastated by the prolonged Aceh War. Under the name "Haji Abdul Ghaffar", he built a relationship of trust with religious elements of the region's population. In his Report on the religious-political situation in Aceh, Snouck strongly opposed the use of military terror tactics against the Acehnese and instead advocated well-organized systematic espionage and winning the support of aristocratic elites. He, however, did identify certain radical Muslim scholars (Ulama) that would only succumb to show of force.

In 1898 Snouck became Colonel Van Heutsz's closest advisor in "pacifying" Aceh, and his advice was instrumental in reversing Dutch fortune in ending the protracted Aceh War. The relationship between Heutsz and Snouck deteriorated when Heutsz proved unwilling to implement Snouck's ideal for an ethical and enlightened administration. In 1903, Snouck married another indigenous woman, with whom he had a son in 1905. Disappointed with colonial policies, he returned to the Netherlands the next year to continue a successful academic career.

Snouck was a friend of the Arab Grand Mufti of Batavia, Habib Usman bin Yahya, who issued fatwa to support the Dutch war against Aceh.

== Sojourn in Mecca (1884–1885) ==
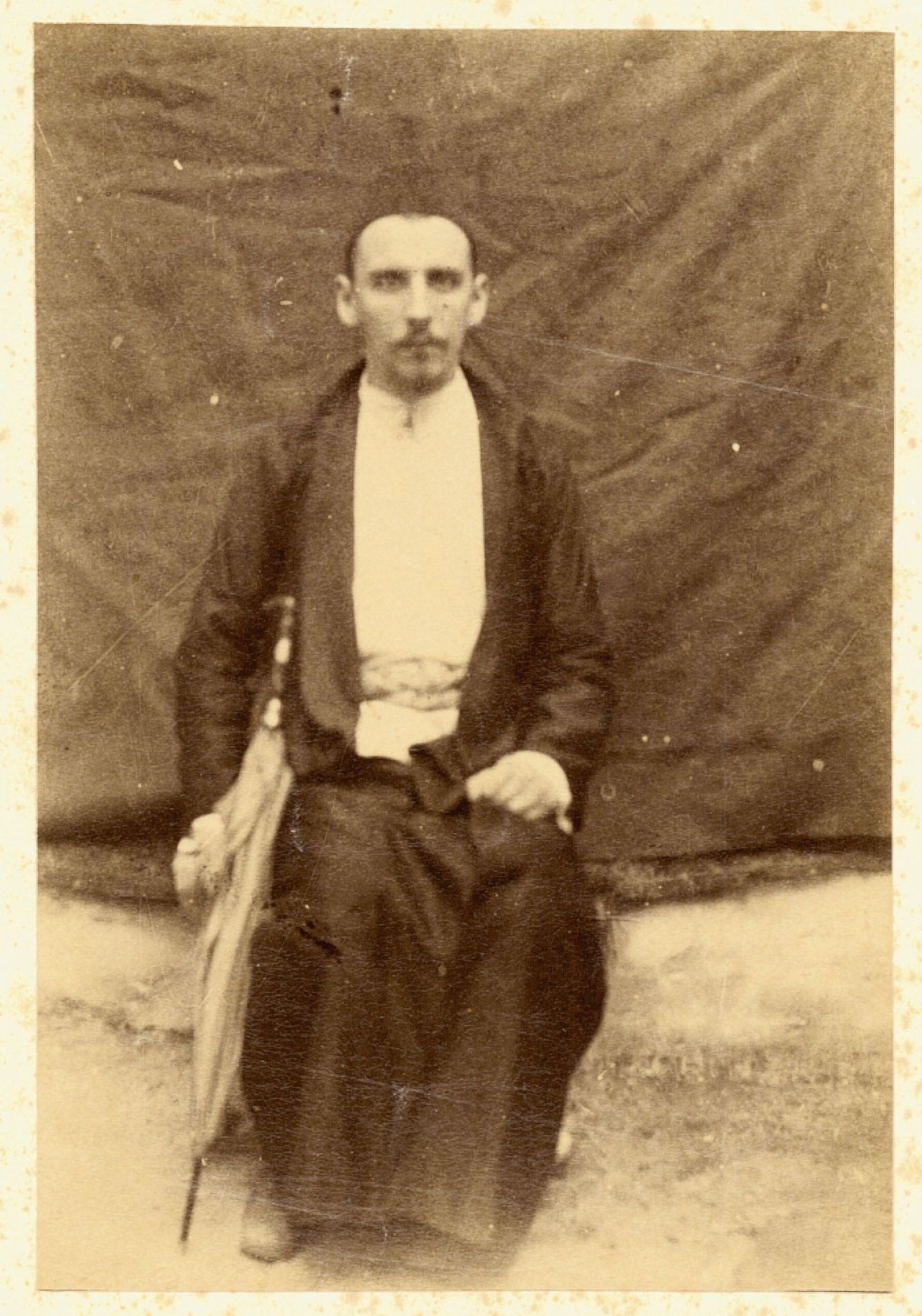
Snouck Hurgronje in Mecca (1885)

In the foreword to Snouck Hurgronje's treatise Mekka in the Latter Part of the 19th Century, we come across the following:

"In 1884–1885 he [i.e. Snouck Hurgronje] had an opportunity to stay for a year in Arabia, about half the year in Mekka, where he lived as a student of Muhammadan learning, and half the year in Jeddah. The result of his experiences is given in a work in German in two volumes, under the title "Mekka", published in 1888–1889. His chief object was not to study the Hajj, an accurate knowledge of which is easier to obtain by reading some of the innumerable pilgrims' handbooks (manâsik) than by attending the ceremonies in the fearful crowd gathering yearly in the Holy Town, in the Valley of Mina and on the Plain of Arafât, but rather to become intimately acquainted with the daily life of the Mekkans and of the thousands of Muhammadans from all parts of the world living in Mekka for material or spiritual purposes".

In an article published in July 1929, Arthur Jeffery elaborates further:

"Our standard scientific work on Mecca and the pilgrimage we owe to the next Christian pilgrim on our roll, Prof. C. Snouck Hurgronje, the Dutch Orientalist, who still lives at Leiden, though retired from his Professorship. His treatise on the origin and nature of the pilgrimage was written in 1880, and in 1885, after having spent five months in the Dutch Consulate at Jiddah, he journeyed to Mecca, where for six months he lived as a student of the Koran, and gathered the material for his monumental work on that city. As Burckhardt had been mainly interested in the topography of the city, and the pilgrimage ceremony, Snouck Hurgronje interested himself particularly in a social study of the Meccan community, and so complete is his work that he has left nothing to later writers save to note the changes made by passing years.

"Hurgronje seems to have enjoyed the freest intercourse with all strata of society in Mecca, and with an adequate scholarly preparation for his task has been able to make Meccan social life a thing of living interest to us. No other writer has so clearly pictured the condition of a society which is welded from an unusually varied conglomeration of nationalities, and which has been affected by the superstitions and prejudices of them all. His picture of the blatant immorality of the city is blacker even than Burckhardt's, and is the evidence of a witness who certainly cannot be accused of prejudice against Islam".

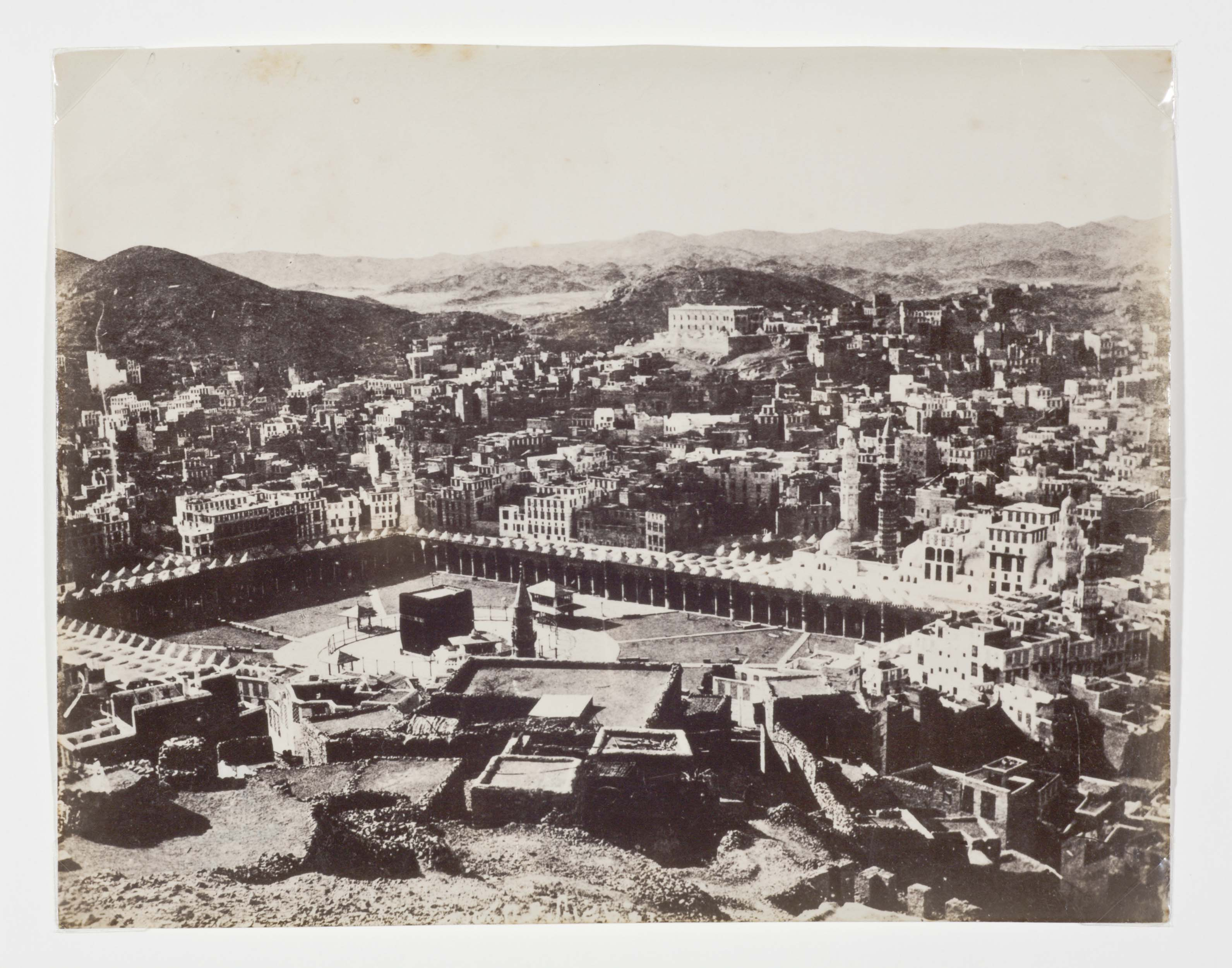
Photographic view of Mecca by Snouck Hurgonje, 1885

The fact that Snouck Hurgronje spent his time in Mecca as a convert to Islam has been criticized by some as "treachery and knavery." For instance the right-wing late Pakistani civil servant and Ambassador of Pakistan to the Netherlands in 1962, Qudrat Ullah Shahab, goes so far in his autobiography as to insinuate:

"A clear example of a group of Dutch Orientalists which, through their misleading statements and thoughts in the garb of knowledge and wisdom, played a conspicuous role in distorting the features of Islam and Muslims, in causing prejudice against Islam in the minds of the Westerners and in serving as an authority for some amongst the Muslims who suffer from inferiority complex, is that of C. Snouck Hurgronje. This gentleman was a professor of Oriental studies at Leiden University. In 1884 he spent six months in Jeddah and then went on to live in Mecca for six more months by adopting a fake Islamic name. The entry of Non-Muslims is prohibited within the precincts of the Haram [Mecca]. Yet the worthy Professor lived there under the false disguise of a Muslim and composed his German book "Mekka" (2 volumes) on the way of life of the Meccan Muslims. He had already authored a Dutch book on the Hajj called 'Het Mekkaansche Feest'. It is an exercise in futility to seek good will, empathy and fairness in the intentions of those who set about to explore the ceremonies of Islam and the conditions of the Muslims, wrapped in the garb of treachery and knavery. Such writings have resulted in creating the Dutch mental-image of Muslims as poly-haremic, licentious, barbaric and mis-managers."

According to L.I. Graf, there was no other possibility for Snouck Hurgronje to be admitted to Mecca without becoming a practicing Muslim:

"Wel bestond voor SH natuurlijk geen andere mogelijkheid toegang tot Mekka te krijgen dan door den moslims een moslim te worden."

i.e. "However for Snouck Hurgronje, of course, there was no other way to gain access to Mecca than by becoming a Muslim"

David Samuel Margoliouth, reminding people of the predicament of non-Muslim observers of the Meccan annual pilgrimage in the nineteenth century, makes the following remark:

"It is asserted that the number of the former [read: Europeans] who have succeeded in witnessing the pilgrimage and returning to tell the tale is small compared with that of those who have sacrificed their lives in the attempt; and those who have accomplished the task safely have in most cases done so by the exercise of great cunning and ingenuity."

This is seconded by Arthur Jeffery in following terms:

"Reliable authorities have told us in regard to Mecca, that hardly a pilgrimage season passes without somebody being done to death on the suspicion of being a Christian in disguise."

Hurgronje remarked: "he (i.e. the orientalist) may have as much sympathy for Islam and its believers as he likes, but most of the time his assurances will be met with mistrust in this remote place (Mecca) with the most narrow of minds".

== Espionage ==
On 28 August 1884, Snouck Hurgronje arrived in Jeddah. At just 27 years old, the Dutch scholar, orientalist, and spy had one main goal — to enter Mecca and gather information that would help maintain Dutch colonial rule. His key task was to observe the activities of pilgrims coming from Aceh and Java and study their connections with Mecca’s ulema community. The Dutch government feared that these pilgrims, influenced by Mecca’s religious leaders, might return home and lead uprisings against colonial authority.

Hurgronje had studied theology at Leiden University and earned his doctorate in 1880 for a thesis titled: The Celebration of Mecca. Later, he taught at the Dutch Colonial Civil Service Training Institute. To enter Mecca, it became essential for him to pretend to be a Muslim. He adopted the name Abdul Ghaffar and gained substantial knowledge of Islamic rituals and customs so that he could win the trust of the local authorities and people. In the Hejaz region, which was under the rule of the Ottoman Empire, he successfully gained the confidence of Governor Osman Pasha, as well as local judges and scholars.

On 21 January 1885, Snouck Hurgronje received permission to enter Mecca. He stayed there for the next seven months, building close relationships with people from various levels of the local Muslim society. He mingled with Mecca’s scholars, muftis, sheikhs, and ordinary residents. He took part in prayers and carefully observed the activities of pilgrims from Aceh, Java, and other regions. He carried a camera weighing around 40 kilograms and used it to photograph the Kaaba, the mosque area, and various parts of Mecca. He also recorded the sound of Qur'an recitation, which is considered the first known recording of a Qur'an recitation in history.

Before leaving Mecca, he safely sent his rare sepia photographs, recordings, and documents to Leiden University Library, where they are preserved to this day. His collection is regarded as a unique record of Mecca’s society, architecture, and religious practices.

After returning from Mecca, Hurgronje was appointed as a colonial adviser to the Dutch East Indies government. He played a key role in shaping policies aimed at limiting Islamic education, placing mosques and religious leaders under state control, and suppressing Islamic movements. His policies and strategies were effective in quelling rebellions during the Aceh War (1873–1914).

Hurgronje’s work remains a topic of debate among historians. Some view him as a skilled spy and architect of colonial policy, while others see him as both an orientalist scholar and a deceptive investigator. His pretending to convert to Islam during his time in Mecca is still a subject of discussion among researchers and historians. However, there is no doubt that he was one of the first people from the Western world to provide a well-organized and authentic account of Meccan society and the pilgrimage.

== Dar al-Islam Vs. Dar al-Harb ==
After the Indian Mutiny of 1857 in which Muslims of India played a predominant role, the British tasked a civil servant, William Wilson Hunter, to submit a report on whether the Indian Muslims were "bound in Conscience to rebel against the Queen"? W.W. Hunter completed his report which subsequently became an influential work titled The Indian Musalmans. In it, W.W. Hunter advanced the pragmatic view that a religious argument, or fatwa, could be used in favor of Her Majesty's Government as much as against it.

He wrote: "The Law Doctors of Northern Hindustan set out by tacitly assuming that India is a Country of the Enemy [Dar al-Harb], and deduce therefrom that religious rebellion is uncalled for. The Calcutta Doctors [i.e. Islamic clerics] declare India to be a Country of Islam [Dar al-Islam], and conclude that religious rebellion is therefore unlawful. This result must be accepted as alike satisfactory to the well-to-do Muhammadans, whom it saves from the peril of contributing to the Fanatic Camp on our Frontier, and gratifying to ourselves, as proving that the Law and the Prophets can be utilized on the side of loyalty as well as on the side of sedition."

Snouck Hurgronje, however, did not agree with W. Hunter's conclusion. He was of the view that close acquaintance with Islamic theological literature on the issue of Dar al-Islam Vs. Dar al-Harb did not warrant Hunter's pragmatism. He wrote:

"Théoriquement, on compte aussi comme appartenant au « Dâr al-lslâm » des pays dépendant autrefois de la domination musulmane, quoique administrés aujourd'hui par des non-Musulmans. C'est ainsi que les territoires des Indes Britanniques et Néerlandaises, habités par des croyants, sont considérés comme territoires de lslâm. C'est à tort que des hommes tels que W. Hunter et d'autres personnages politiques anglais, s'en sont réjouis, s'imaginant que cette doctrine donnait un caractère de séditions illégales, aux insurrections des Musulmans des Indes Britanniques contre l'autorité anglaise. Vaine illusion! Si la doctrine rangeait ces colonies orientales dans le territoire de la guerre, comme c'est le cas pour l'Angleterre et les Pays-Bas, la règle légale, qui n'est d'ailleurs pas sans exceptions, ne permettrait aux Musulmans de s'y livrer à des actes belliqueux qu'avec l'autorisation du chef de la communauté musulmane. Dans le territoire de l'Islâm même, le souverain non-musulman est une anomalie on ne peut le supporter qu'aussi longtemps qu'on est impuissant à réagir. Tout pays qui se trouve en dehors des limites du Dâr al-lslâm est territoire de Guerre en son entier et cela veut dire: destiné à être transformé par la force en territoire de l'Islâm, aussitôt que les circonstances le permettent. Pour les véritables païens, la soumission ne peut se faire que sous la forme de conversion à la foi en Allah et son Prophète. Ceux qui confessent un culte reconnu par l'Islâm peuvent se borner à reconnaître l'autorité de l'État musulman, comme gouvernement suprême."	"Theoretically, countries formerly under Muslim rule, even though now administered by non-Muslims, are also considered part of the "Dar al-Islam" [House of Islam]. Thus, the territories of British and Dutch India, inhabited by believers, are considered territories of Islam [Dar al-Islam]. It was a mistake for men like W. Hunter and other English political figures to rejoice in this, imagining that this doctrine gave the character of illegal sedition to the insurrections of the Muslims of British India against English authority. A vain illusion! If doctrine situated these eastern colonies in the Territory of War [Dar al-Harb] under the rule of a Protectorate, as is the case with colonial India under England and colonial Indonesia under the Netherlands, the statutory rule, which is not without exceptions, would allow Muslims to engage in warlike activities only with the permission of the leader of the Muslim community. In the territory of Islam itself, the non-Muslim rule is an anomaly which should be suffered only so long as Islam is powerless to react. Every country which lies outside the boundaries of Dar al-Islam is Territory of War [Dar al-Harb] in its entirety and this means: destined to be transformed by force into the territory of Islâm, as soon as circumstances permit. For true pagans, submission can only be made in the form of conversion to the faith in Allah and his Prophet. Those who confess a religion recognized by Islâm shall be confined to recognizing the authority of the Muslim State as the supreme government."

== Jihād ==
In January 1915 Hurgronje published the article "Holy War made in Germany" in the well-known Dutch journal De Gids. The article is a polemic against European culture that condemns the moral outrages of World War I. Hurgronje blamed Germany and its cadre of orientalist scholars for the declaration of Jihad made by the Ottoman government in 1914. He accused the German orientalists of undermining the goals of modernizing Islamic society. According to Hurgronje the war was a consequence of forces beyond the control of Muslims. He argues that Muslims are capable of progress and that he had in common with "the Turk" the ideas of "religious peace and freedom of thought". He saw Jihad as a medieval phenomenon and that the 1908 Revolution had ended this medievalism. The "fetish of the Caliphate" (and the associated Jihad), he says, experiences a revival only under European pressure. His friendship with Carl Heinrich Becker who was attacked in the article was severely strained as a result.

He writes:

It has been the fate of Islam that this doctrine of the jihād or holy war, the application of which formerly contributed so much to its greatness and renown, should in modern times have set the greatest difficulties in its path... So long as not one single Moslim teacher of consideration dreams of regarding these [Islamic] laws of the middle ages as abrogated, while a great proportion of the [Islamic] people exhibit the strongest inclination to restore the conditions which prevailed some centuries ago, so long does it remain impossible, however anxious we may be to do so, to omit the jihād from our calculations when forming a judgment on the relation of Islam to other religions... The way in which the doctrine of jihād is interpreted by the Mohammedan teachers and embraced in less systematic form by the mass of the people, furnishes an excellent indication of the progress that Islam has made at any given time or place in this direction, whither it is being impelled with increasing force by the political conditions of modern days. In the end it must yield entirely to that force; it must frankly abandon the tenets of jihād and abide by the practically harmless doctrine respecting the last days when a Messiah or a Mahdī will come to reform the world. Then will Islam differ from other creeds only in so far as it upholds another catechism and another ritual as the means whereby eternal salvation may be won. But before that day arrives the last political stronghold of Islam will probably have been brought under European influence and all less civilized Mohammedan peoples will have been compelled to submit to the control of a strong European government.

== Final years ==
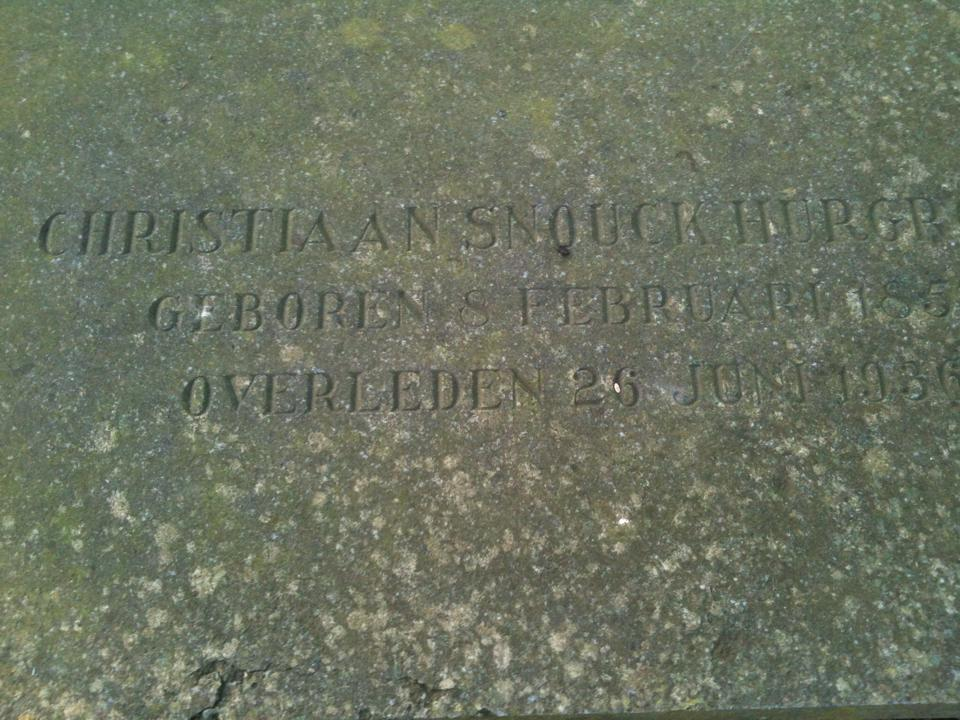
Snouck Hurgronje's grave in Leiden

Back in the Netherlands Snouck accepted several professorships at Leiden University, including Arabic language, Acehnese language and Islamic education. He continued to produce numerous elaborate academic studies and became the international authority on all matters relating to the Arab world and Muslim religion. His expert advice on urgent issues was often sought after by other European countries and much of his work was already being translated into a.o. German, French and English. In 1925 he was even offered a professorship at the prestigious National Egyptian University in Cairo, the prime university of the Middle East. In 1927 he stepped down as Rector magnificus and professor, but stayed active as adviser up to his death in Leiden in 1936.

During and after his academic tenure Snouck remained a progressive colonial adviser and critic. His reformist vision to solve the challenges of a lasting relationship between the Netherlands and the Indies was based on the principle of association. To achieve this future association and end the existing dualist governance of the Dutch East Indies, he advocated increased autonomy through western education of the indigenous governing elite. In 1923 he called for: "Vigorous reform of the constitution of the Dutch East Indies" where "one has to break with the concept of moral and intellectual inferiority of the natives" and allow them "free and representative democratic bodies and optimal autonomy". Conservative elements in the Netherlands reacted by financing an alternative school for Colonial Civil Servants in Utrecht.

== Sources ==
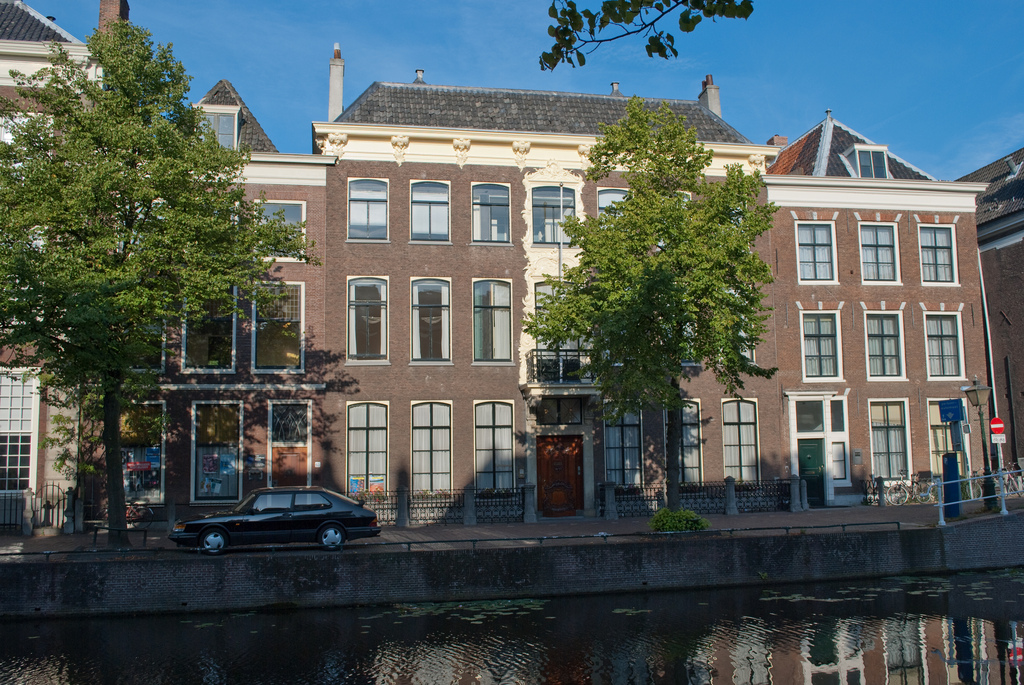
The Christiaan Snouck Hurgronje Home inherited by Leiden University.

The main data on Snouck Hurgonje's studies and colonial policy relating to Islam are available in the archives of the Ministry of Colonies managed by the National Archives in The Hague. The archive includes all decisions by the governors-general, all Minister of Colonies mail reports, and all government laws and regulations. Additionally data is available in the Indonesian National Archives in Jakarta and at the Royal Institute of Southeast Asian and Caribbean Studies (KITLV) in Leiden and the Leiden University Library.

The archives, correspondence and photos of Snouck Hurgronje are available at Leiden University Library and digitally accessible through Digital Collections Some of his photographs now form part of the Khalili Collection of Hajj and the Arts of Pilgrimage.

The Leiden University Fund (Leids Universiteits Fonds), dedicated to university reform is located at the 'Snouck Hurgronjehuis', Snouck's home donated to the university.

== Gallery ==
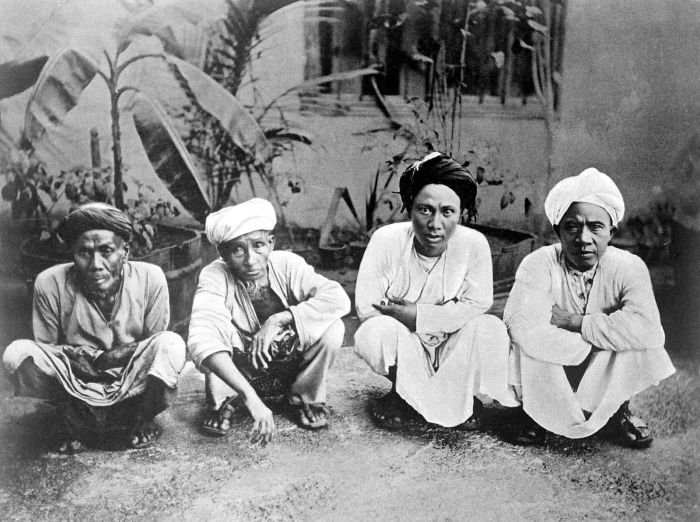
Muslim pilgrims from Palembang, Sumatra on their way to Mecca. Photographed by Snouck Hurgronje at the Dutch Consulate in Jeddah, 1884.

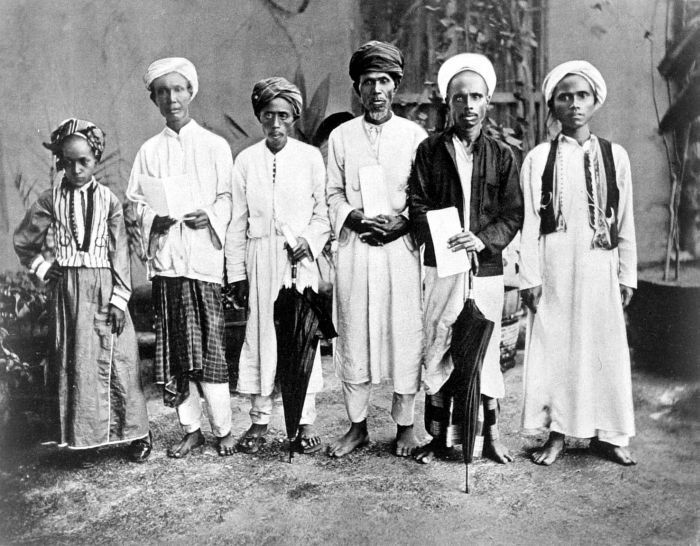
Muslim pilgrims from Ambon, Kai and Banda island, Maluku Islands on their way to Mecca. Photographed by Snouck Hurgronje at the Dutch Consulate in Jeddah, 1884.

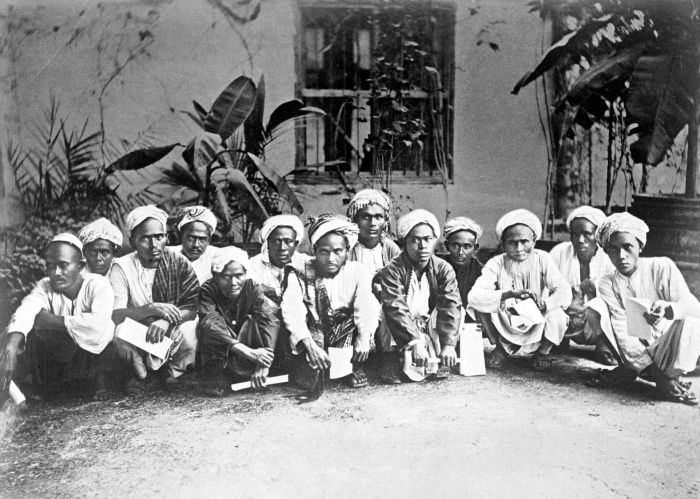
Muslim pilgrims from Mandailing, Sumatra on their way to Mecca. Photographed by Snouck Hurgronje at the Dutch Consulate in Jeddah, 1884.

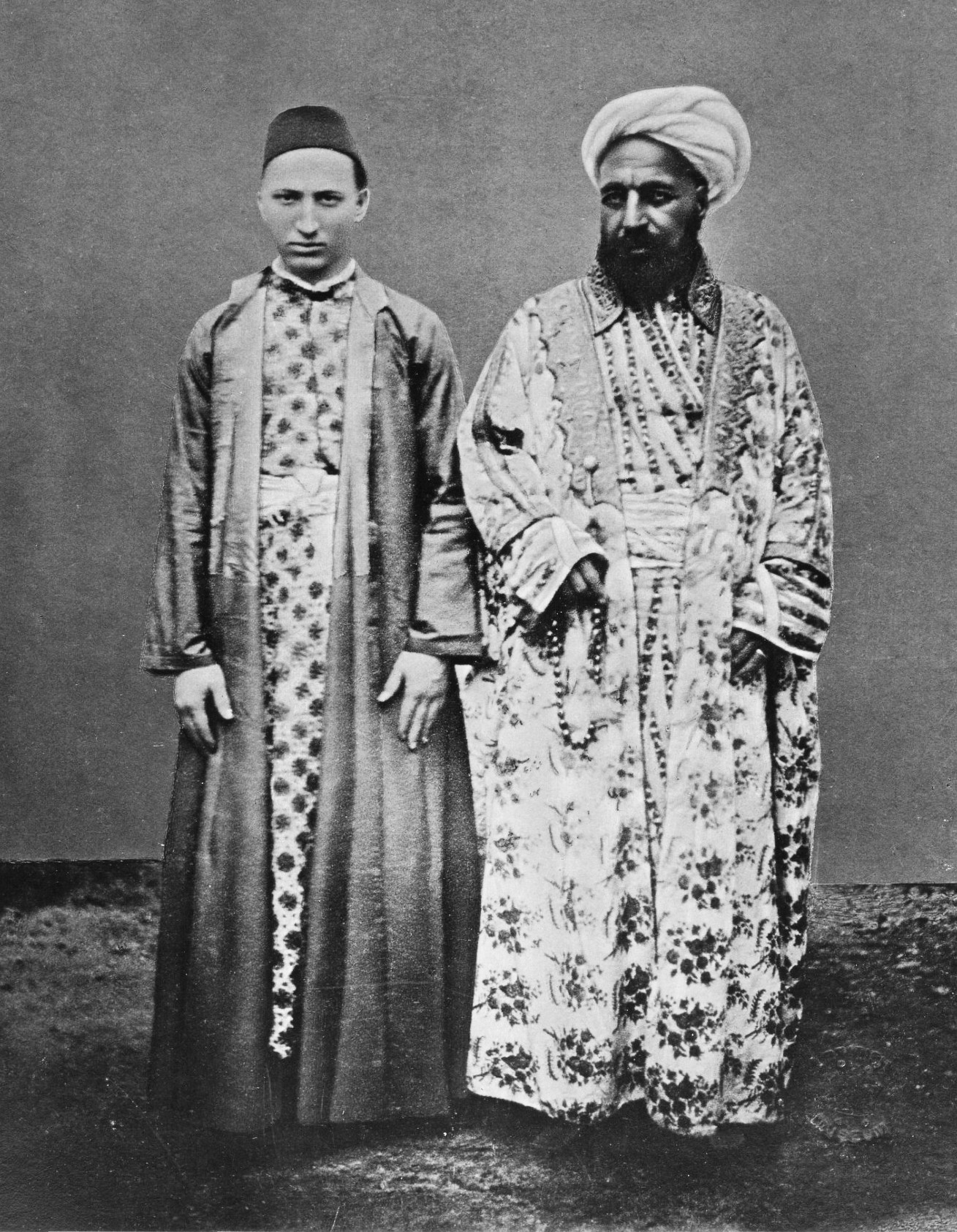
A Meccan merchant (right) and his Circassian slave. Entitled, 'Vornehmner Kaufmann mit seinem cirkassischen Sklaven' [Distinguished merchant and his circassian slave], 1888.

== Works ==
- Christiaan Snouck Hurgronje (1888). Mekka. Vol. 1. Haag: M. Nijhoff.
- Christiaan Snouck Hurgronje (1889). Mekka. Vol. 2. Haag: M. Nijhoff.
- Christiaan Snouck Hurgronje (1906). The Achehnese. Volume II. Leiden: Brill.
- Christiaan Snouck Hurgronje (1913). The Holy War "Made in Germany". New York: G. P. Putnam's Sons.
- Christiaan Snouck Hurgronje (1916). Mohammedanism: Lectures on Its Origin, Its Religious and Political Growth, and Its Present State. New York: G. P. Putnam's Sons.
