= Hendrik van den Eijnde =

Dutch sculptor

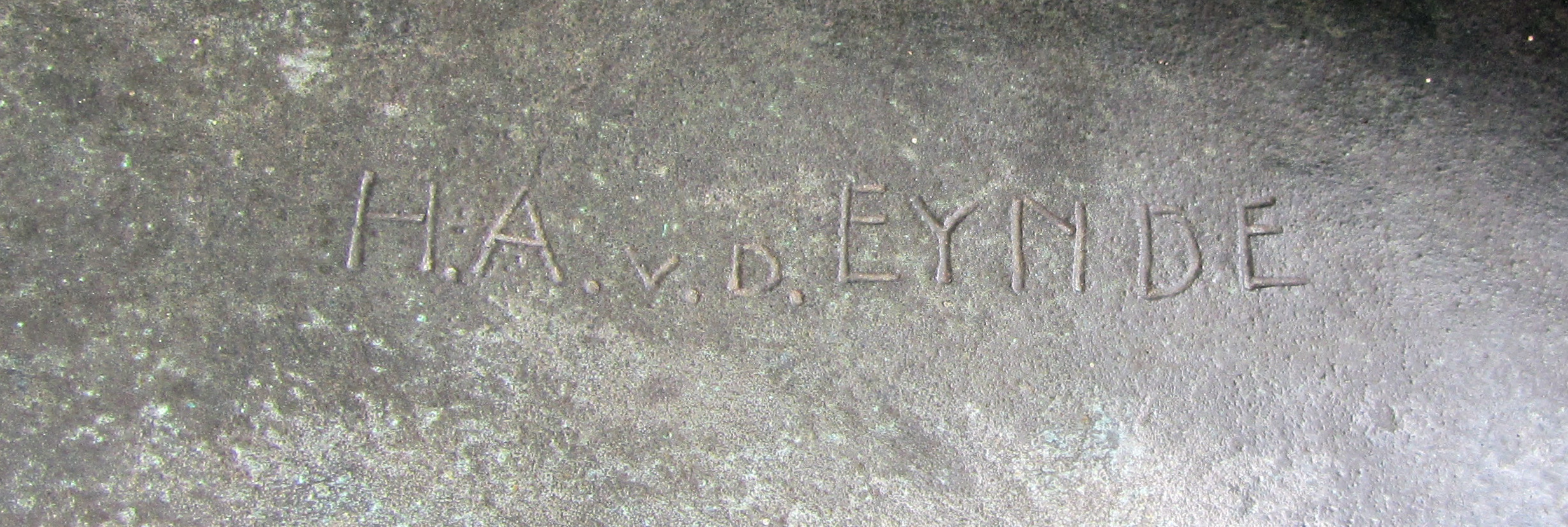
- Van den Eynde's signature on The Contemplation
- Born: 29 November 1869; Haarlem, Netherlands
- Died: 1 February 1939 (aged 69); Haarlem, Netherlands
- Occupation: Sculptor

Hendrik Albertus van den Eijnde or van den Eynde (29 November 1869 – 1 February 1939) was a Dutch sculptor. His work was part of the sculpture event in the art competition at the 1936 Summer Olympics.

== Life and work ==
Hendrik van den Eijnde was born into a Catholic family in Haarlem. He initially worked as a frame maker and received drawing lessons from the sculptor Franciscus Leonardus Stracké (1849–1919), in whose studio he worked for several years. He continued to develop through practice and study and was supported by Bart van Hove from 1902. In 1903 he founded the Haarlem Art Circle together with Henri Boot, Jan Bronner, Walter van Diedenhoven, Ko Doncker and Ben Kamp.

Van den Eijnde led the sculptor's studio with Hildo Krop, Anton Rädecker and Joop van Lunteren on the sculpture decoration of the Scheepvaarthuis in Amsterdam, which was completed in 1916. This workshop gave a great impulse to the revival of stone sculpture in the Netherlands, where stone carving could be learned again. Most of their work parallels the heyday of the Amsterdam School. He started his own studio in 1917 and was a construction sculptor at the Government Buildings Agency (Rijksgebouwendienst) from 1917 to 1923. Van den Eijnde lived in Haarlem and Heemstede and worked there until 1922. He was active as a sculptor of monuments and facade decorations on houses and commercial buildings.

== Works (selection) ==
- Lieven de Key and Frans Hals, Houtbrug, Haarlem, Netherlands
- Four World Seas (1916), entrance sculptures of porphyry and terracotta, Scheepvaarthuis, Amsterdam
- Troelstranaald (1920), Kastanjestraat, Haarlem
- Entrance sculptures at broadcasting building A of Radio Kootwijk (1922), Radio Kootwijk, Apeldoorn
- Entrance sculptures (1924), Iepenlaan, Bloemendaal
- Statues and ornaments (1924), Hoofdpostkantoor, Utrecht
- Sculptures of lions (1925), later added to the Hoofdpostkantoor, Utrecht
- Coen, Daendels and Van Heutsz (1925), Netherlands Trading Society, building De Bazel, Vijzelstraat, Amsterdam
- Sculpture (1926), Magazijn de Bijenkorf, The Hague
- The Contemplation (1926), Sculpture second columbarium, Crematorium Westerveld
- Sculptures near the Grote Houtbrug, Haarlem
- Facade stone (1930), De Bijenkorf (Rotterdam), now in Woerden
- Learning through Play (1930), Julianaplein, Heemstede
- Pelican Nest (1932), relief (part of originally seven reliefs (titled Levensgang) that were designed for a now demolished office building of the insurance company OLVEH in The Hague), Laan van Rozenburg, Heemstede
- Entry of Saint Servatius and other reliefs (1932), from the pylons of the original Wilhelminabrug, Maastricht
- The Source (1936), Bronsteebrug, Heemstede
- Wilhelmina Memorial (1939), on the site where the Statue of Liberty now stands in Heemstede (the memorial was demolished by the occupying forces in 1941)

== Gallery ==
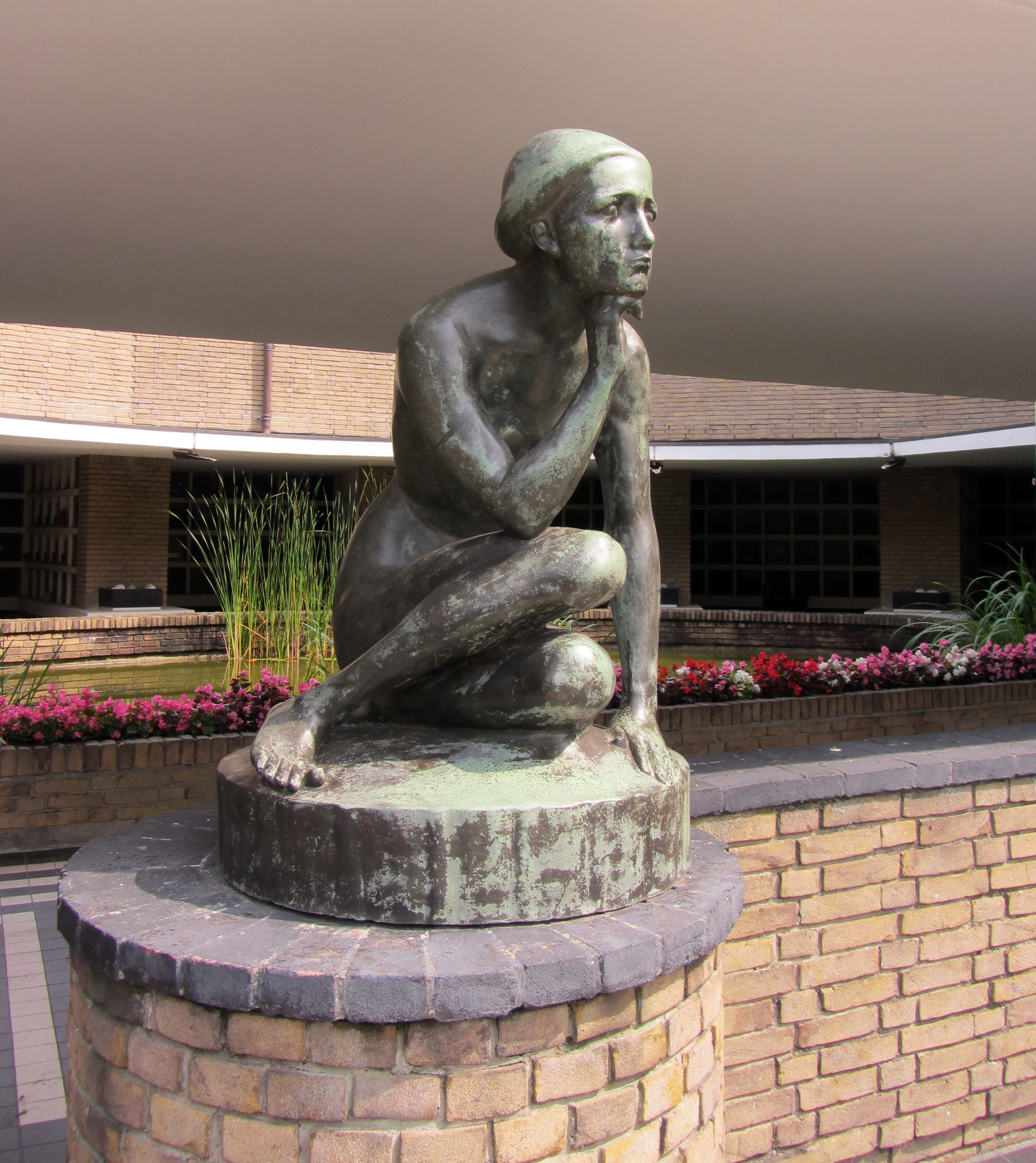
The Contemplation, 1925-1926, Second columbarium, Westerveld Crematorium, Velsen, Netherlands

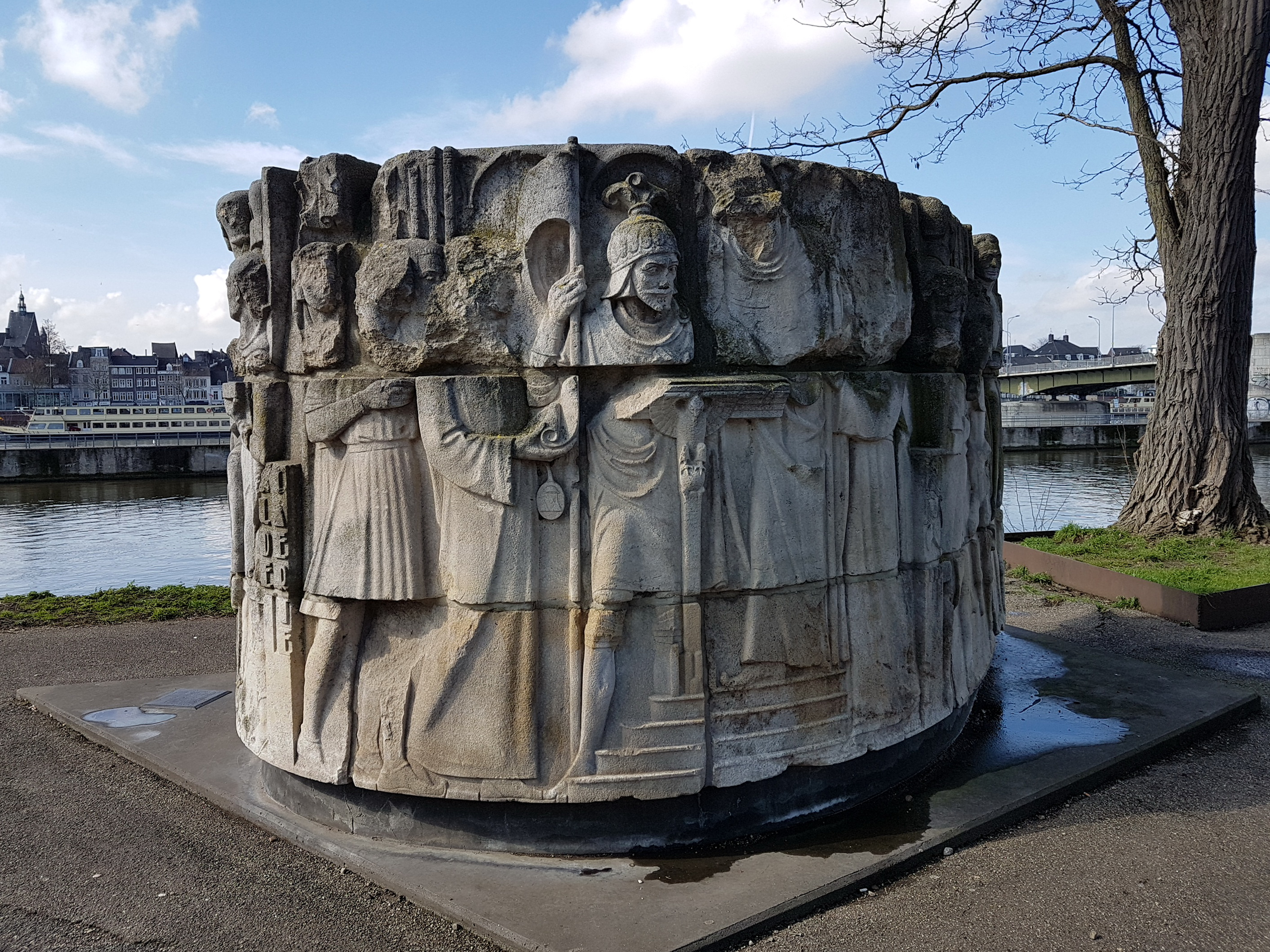
Duke Henry I of Brabant Grants the Burghers of Maastricht their Constitution, 1932, Kleine Griend, Maastricht

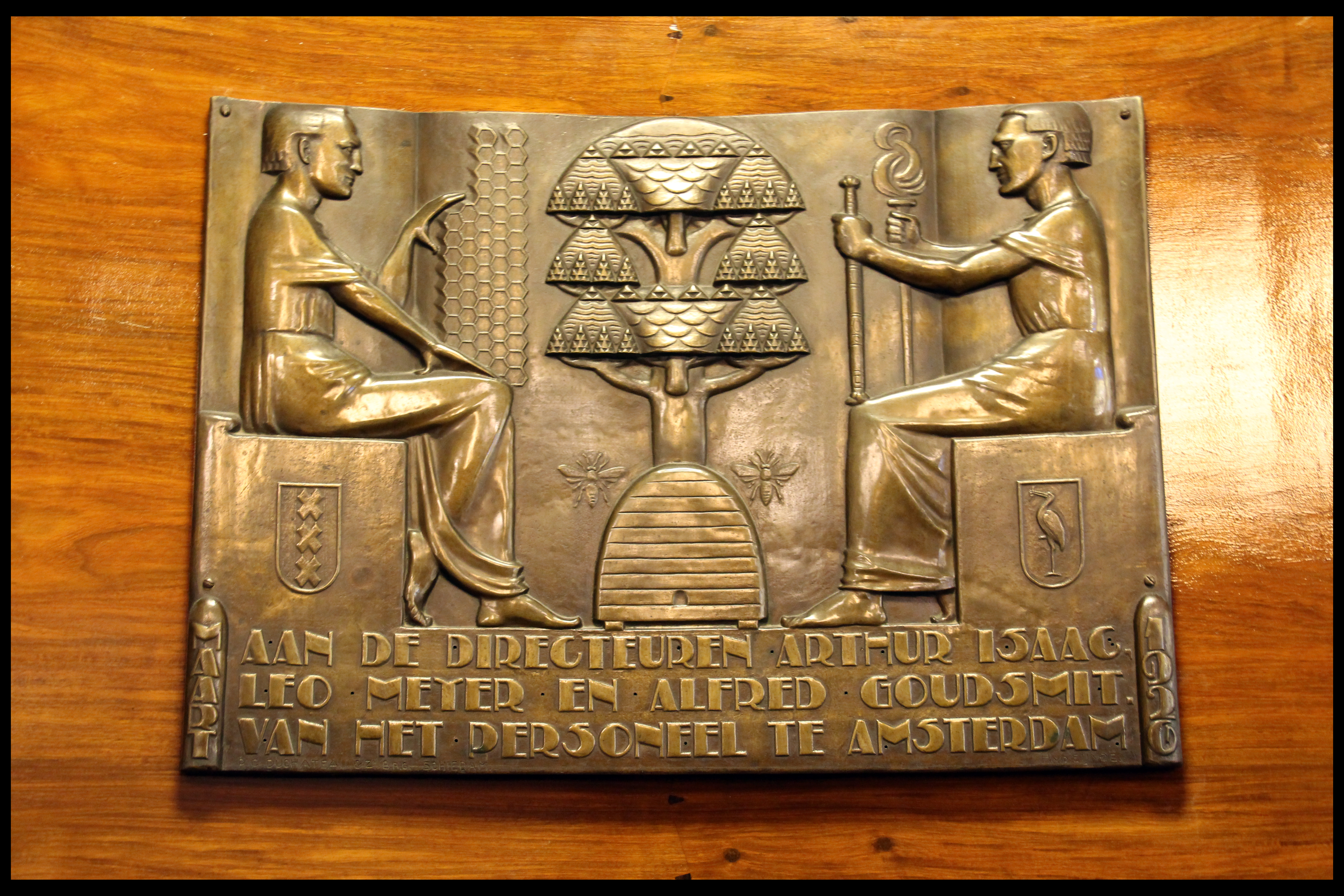
Relief in the Bijenkorf, 1924-1926, The Hague

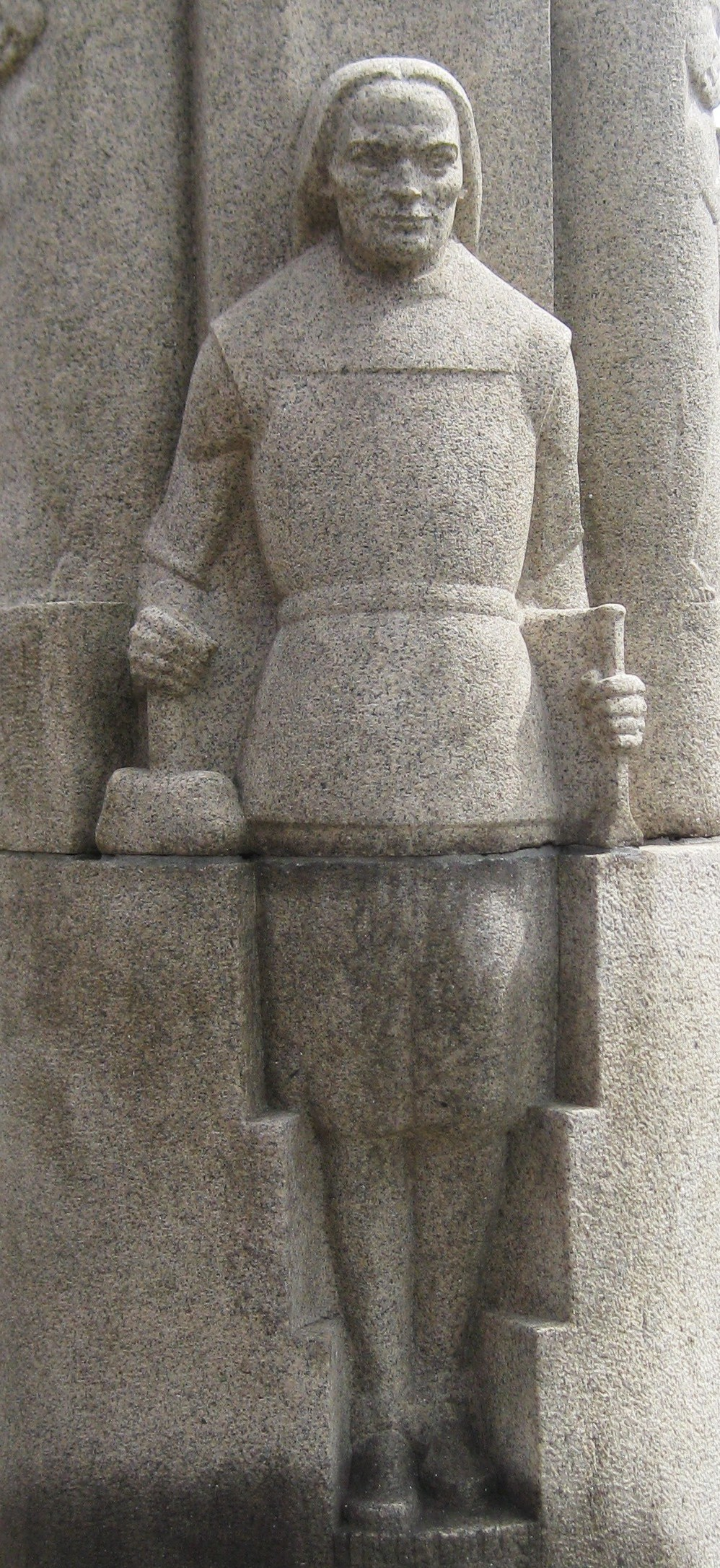
Lieven de Key, 1930, Grote Houtbrug, Haarlem

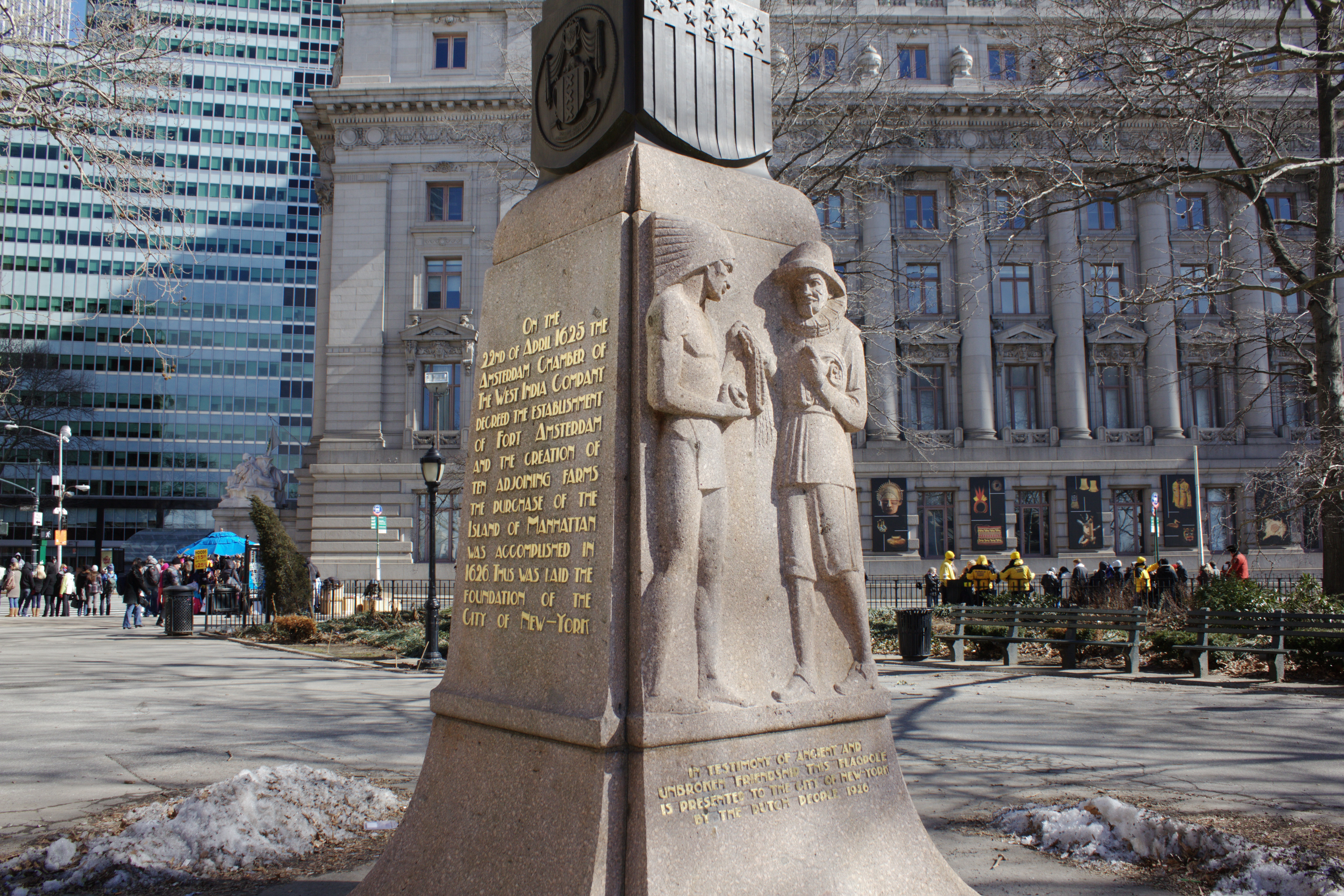
Netherland Monument, 1926, Battery Park, Manhattan, U.S.

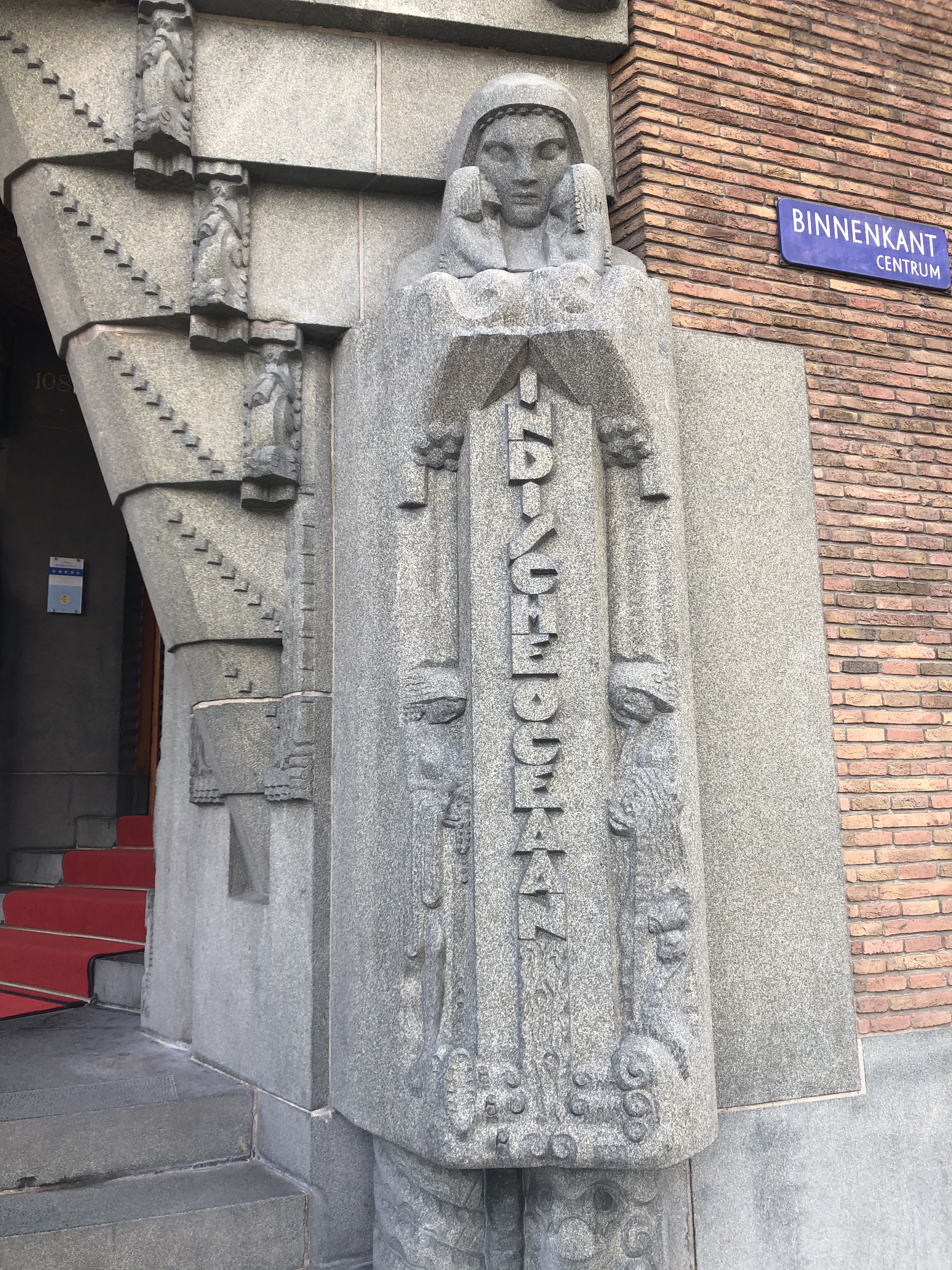
Exterior sculptures of the Scheepvaarthuis, Amsterdam
