= Batèë Iliëk =

Village in Samalanga, Aceh, Indonesia

Coordinates: 5.1670°N 96.3560°E

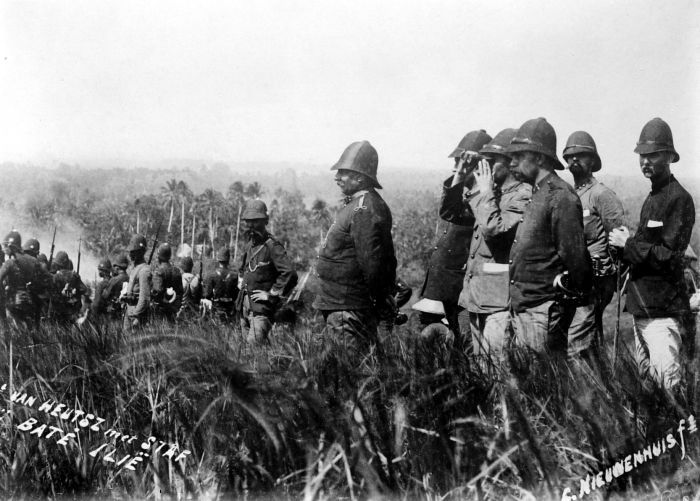
Lieutenant General J.B. van Heutsz with his staff during the attack on Batèë Iliëk, March 12, 1901

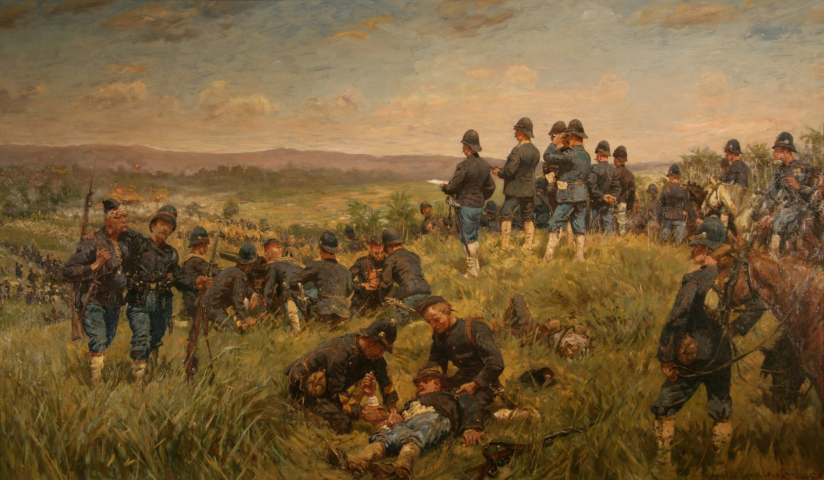
Attack on Batèë Iliëk in 1901, by Jan Hoynck van Papendrecht

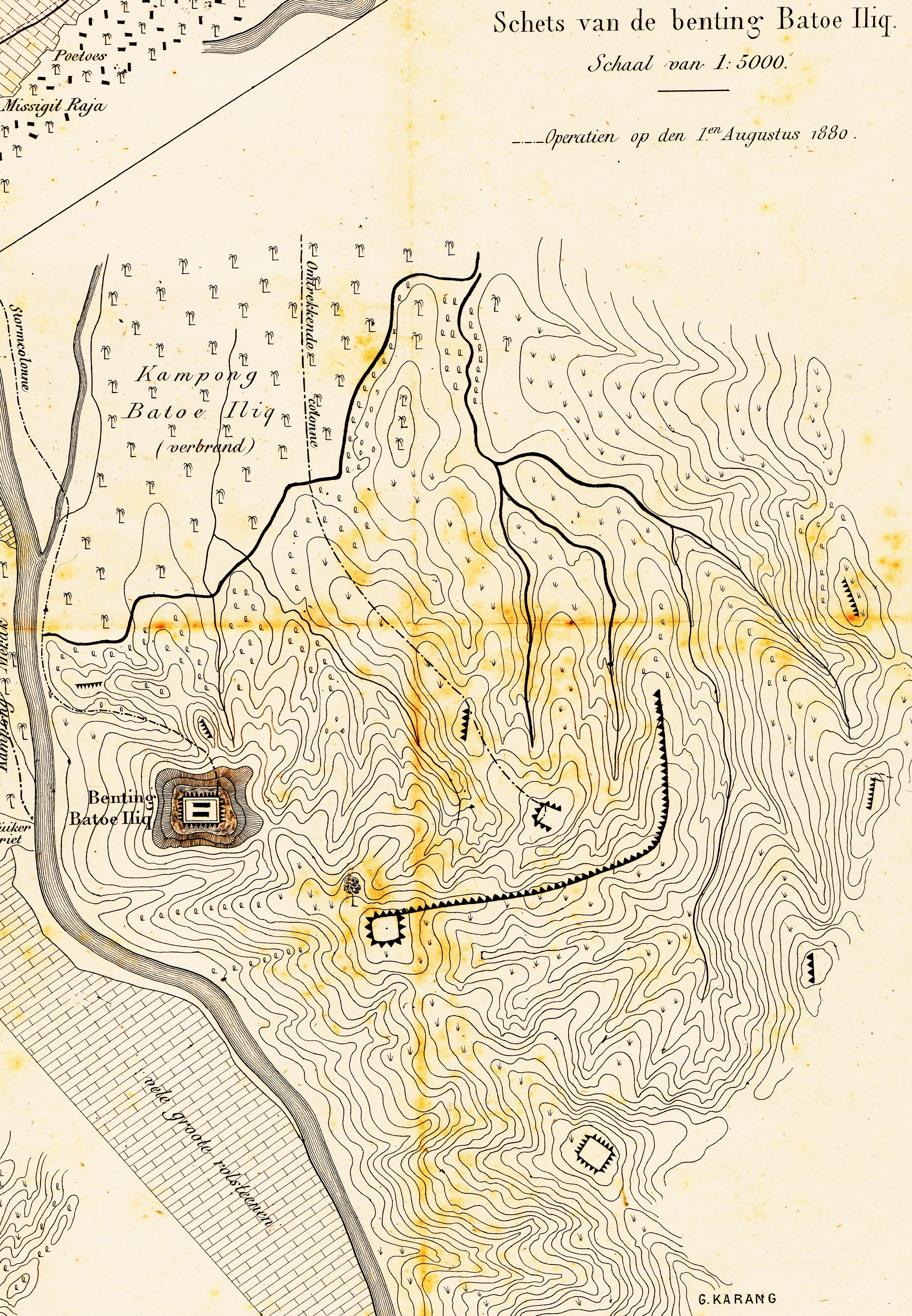
Batèë Iliëk map from Beschrijving van de Atjeh-oorlog by Egbert Broer Kielstra (1883).

Batee Iliek, or Batèë Iliëk, is a village (gampong) in the Samalanga district, Bireuen Regency on the north coast of Aceh, Indonesia. It is located in the banks of Batee Iliek River.

Batee Iliek was an important stronghold during the Aceh War, which was impregnable until February 3, 1901. It was an important spiritual center and recruitment center for guerrilla fighters.

== Sources ==
- 1900. W.A. Terwogt. Het land van Jan Pieterszoon Coen. Geschiedenis van de Nederlanders in oost-Indië. P. Geerts, Hoorn.
- 1902. G. Kepper. Wapenfeiten van het Nederlands Indische Leger; 1816–1900. M.M. Cuvee, The Hague.
