= Oil-paper umbrella =

Type of umbrella originating in China

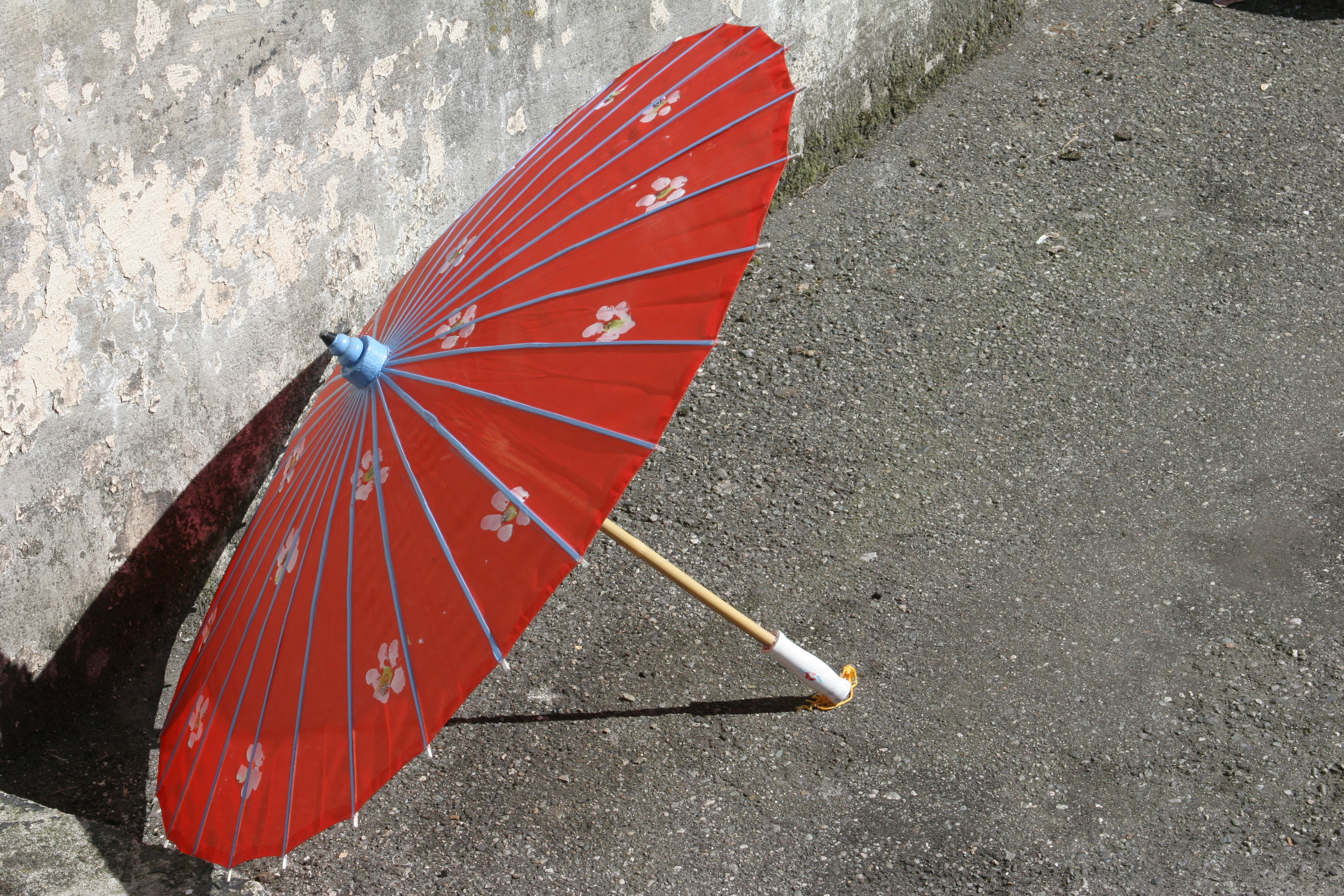

Chinese name
- Chinese: 油纸伞
- Traditional Chinese: 油紙傘
- Simplified Chinese: 油纸伞
Transcriptions
Standard Mandarin
- Hanyu Pinyin: yóuzhǐsǎn

Japanese name
- Kanji: 和傘
Transcriptions
- Revised Hepburn: wagasa

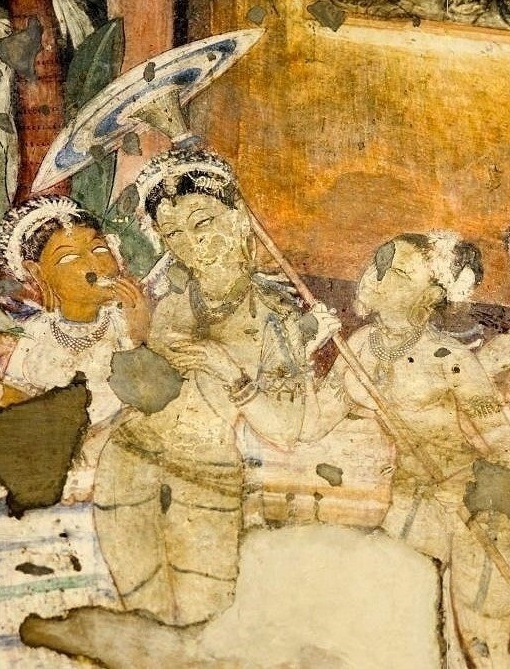
A painting in Ajanta site featuring an oil paper umbrella, 2nd century BC to 6th century AD

An oil-paper umbrella (Chinese: 油紙傘; Chinese: 油纸伞; pinyin: yóuzhǐsǎn, Mandarin pronunciation: [i̯ǒu̯ʈʂɨ̀sàn]) is a type of paper umbrella that originated in China. It subsequently spread across several East, South and Southeast Asian countries such as Japan, Korea, Malaysia, Myanmar, Bangladesh, India, Sri Lanka, Thailand, Laos, Vietnam, Cambodia and Philippines — where it was further developed with distinct characteristics.

In addition to being used for shade, oil-paper umbrellas are also traditional wedding items. In traditional Chinese and Japanese weddings, the matron of honor would cover the bride with a red oil-paper umbrella upon her arrival to ward off evil spirits. Purple umbrellas are a symbol of longevity for elders, while white umbrellas are used in funerals. Oil-paper umbrellas are also used as props in Japanese traditional dances and tea ceremonies.

In the early Hakka society, two umbrellas were usually given as dowry, due to the "paper" (纸) and "child" (子) homonym in the language (Pha̍k-fa-sṳ: chṳ́), symbolizing a blessing for the woman to "give birth to a son soon", a propitiatory compliment to the newlyweds at the time. As the character "umbrella" contains five "people", giving the umbrellas also represents a blessing for the couple to have many sons and grandsons. In addition, because of the "oil" and "have" homonym, and that the umbrellas open into a round shape, they symbolize a happy, complete life. It was also customary to give an umbrella to a 16-year-old man at his rite of passage.

In religious celebrations, oil-paper umbrellas are often seen on sacred sedan chairs as protective coverings—used to shelter people from rain and sunlight, and to drive away evil spirits. Today, oil-paper umbrellas are mostly sold as works of art or souvenirs.

== History ==
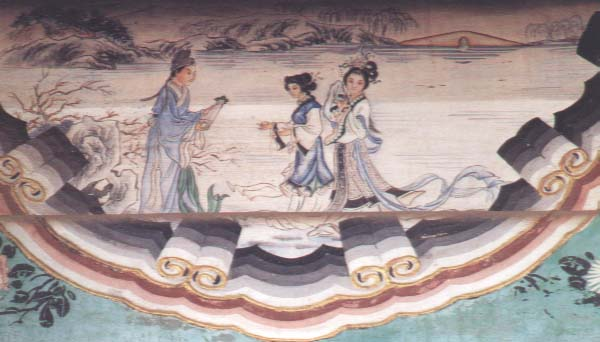
Oil-paper umbrella in the Legend of the White Snake

The spread of oil-paper umbrellas was started by the invention of Yun (雲氏), wife of Luban (魯班). "Chop bamboo sticks to thin strips, covered in animal fur, closed to become a cane, opened as a cone." Early umbrella materials were mostly feathers or silks, later replaced by paper. When oil-paper umbrellas first appeared is unknown. Some estimate that they spread across to Korea and Japan during the Tang dynasty. It was commonly called the "green oil-paper umbrella" during the Song dynasty. The popularity grew and the oil-paper umbrella became commonplace during the Ming dynasty. They are often mentioned in popular Chinese literature. By the 19th century, oil-paper umbrellas were a common item in international trade under the name kittisols.

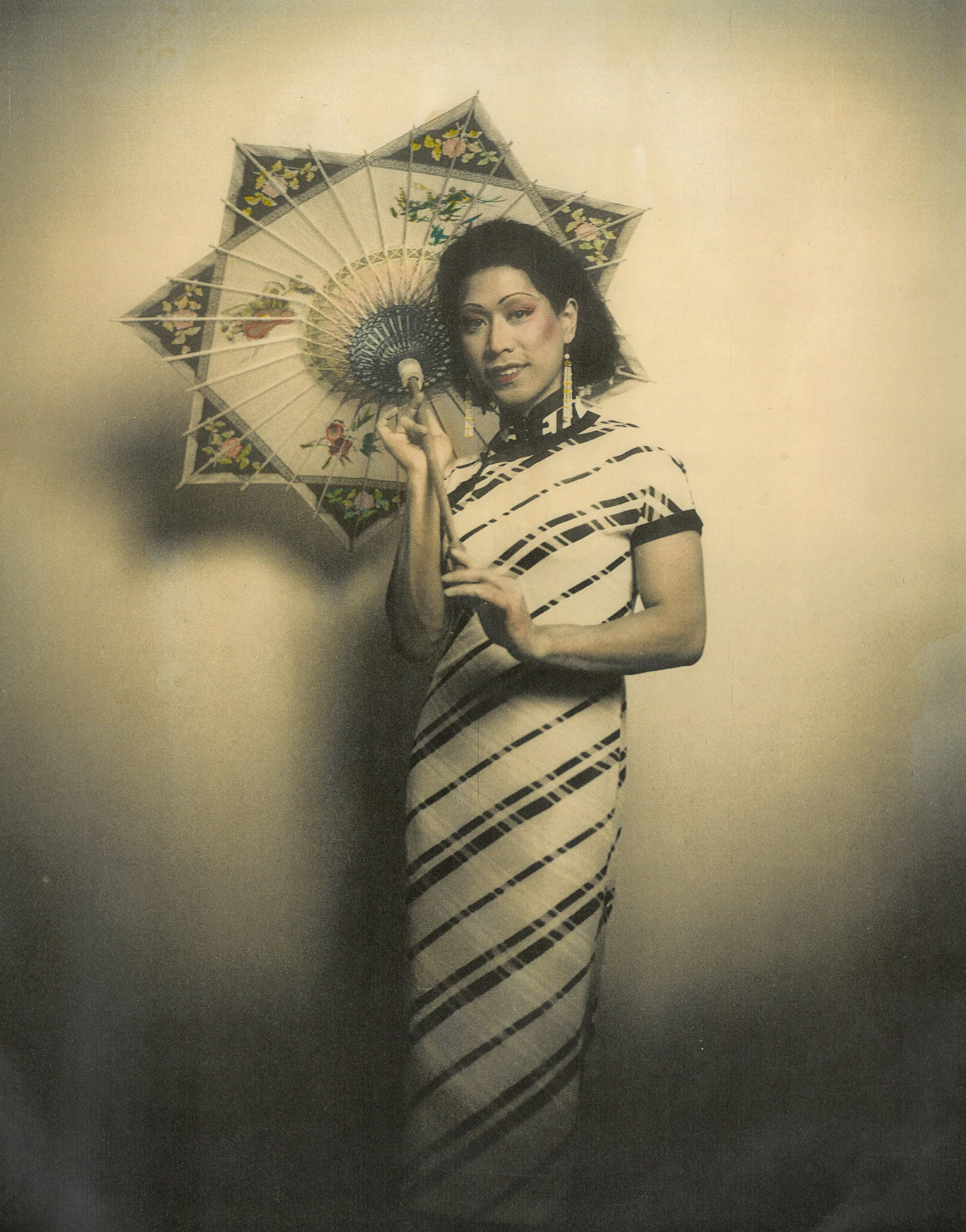
A handcoloured photo of a woman in Shanghai wearing a qipao and holding an octagon shape parasol, c.1930s

== Basic production process ==
The production process and required procedures are different in each region. However, in general, they can be divided into four main steps:

1. Bamboo is selected
2. The bamboo is crafted and soaked in water. It is then dried in the sun, drilled, threaded and assembled into a skeleton.
3. Washi paper is cut and glued onto the skeleton. It is trimmed, oiled, and exposed to sunlight.
4. Lastly, patterns are painted onto the umbrella.

== In Mainland China ==
The art of the Chinese style of oil-paper umbrellas is mostly focused on traditional black and white Chinese painting, such as flowers, birds, and scenery. Others include scenes from famous Chinese literature, such as Dream of the Red Chamber and Romance of the Western Chamber. Yet, some have Chinese calligraphy instead of paintings. However, traditional colors are kept on the sticks and the scaffold of the umbrella to maintain the antiquity.

=== Yuhang, Zhejiang ===
In Yuhang District, Zhejiang, oil-paper umbrellas have been produced since the era of the Qianlong Emperor (1769), by Dong Wenyuan (董文遠; Dǒng Wényuǎn), who owned an umbrella shop. Oil-paper umbrellas in Yuhang are made with high mechanical skills and top materials, which provide their endurance. Prolonged exposure to sunlight and rain does no damage, thus their popularity among common people. Many travelers who passed through Yuan would buy umbrellas from Dong Wenyuan's umbrella shop as souvenirs for friends and relatives. Oil-paper umbrellas in Yuhang are available in a variety of different types and purposes, including those used for fishing or as collectibles.

In 1951, Zhejiang province chose Yuhang as the focused point of the industrial artifact for oil-paper umbrellas and initiated a group for this establishment in 1952. The later established "Artifact Rain Umbrella Industry Co-operations" (雨傘手工業合作社; Yǔsǎn shǒugōngyè hézuòshè) was the first industry of artifacts in Zhejiang province. This establishment was once in the spotlight of the Chinese media, however, as the popular metallic umbrella appeared on the market and oil-paper umbrellas have faced extinction.

On December 5, 2006, artisan Liu Youquan (劉有泉; Liú Yǒuquán) met a government official of the Yuhang district and proposed to recover the art of yóuzhǐsǎn production in Yuhan, with the intention of starting a new pop culture trend and increase local wealth. Liu spent a few hundred RMB and bought some dozens of the bamboo umbrella from a bamboo umbrella factory. But Liu did not have the skills, only to keep these as a "canvas" for 30 some years. A local media reported for a search of an oil-paper umbrella artisan and increased local awareness. Four days later, four artisans: Fang Jinquan (房金泉; Fáng Jīnquán), Chen Yue Xiang (陳月祥; Chén Yuèxiáng), Shen Lihua (沈麗華; Chén Lìhuá), and Sun Shuigen (孫水根; Sūn Shuǐgēn) prompted and have intentions to recover the art (drawing oil paintings on the bamboo umbrella). They have passed their skills and technique to some local bamboo farmers and brought income to them. The governmental officials of Yuhang have listed this art for major protection and important antique artifact (Antiquities Act).

Production requires skilled hands and technique as well as personal experience. Training to become a master in oil-paper umbrella manufacture requires an apprenticeship and a great deal of practice. Apprentices must practice the skills for three years to officially master this technique. Tools are made by professional blacksmiths. The material of the umbrellas is chosen with care. The umbrella scaffold is made from either bamboo or wood, tied with hair strings. The best umbrellas are made from peach flowers, as the umbrella surface is soaked in persimmon pigment. The persimmon pigment is made from fermenting the juice of green persimmons, which provides a suitable stickiness. The soaked flower petals are stuck to the umbrella scaffold one by one. Paintings or pictures are drawn on the peach flower petals prior to painting tung oil on top. The finalized umbrella is left to dry in a dry dark room. It requires at least 70 steps to produce a well-crafted oil-paper umbrella.

=== Sichuan ===
In Luzhou, Sichuan, the oil-paper umbrella culture started around the end of Ming dynasty and beginning of Qing dynasty. Oil-paper umbrellas have existed in Sichuan for as long as four hundred years. Here, the umbrellas are exquisite with fine paintings, abundant colors and beautiful outlooks, the umbrellas are also famous for their ability to shield strong winds. In 1993 May, six experienced artisans spent four months producing a famous Erlongxizhu umbrella (Èr lóng xì zhū), which was exported to countries such as England, Malaysia and Singapore. The Erlongxizhu was made out of 88 pinaceae and 52 bamboo sticks with 1,800 skins of paper and 100 kilograms (220 lb) of oil pigment. Producing the Erlongxizhu required over 70 procedures and it was regarded as the "Chinese King of Umbrellas".

After Western umbrellas had increased in popularity, the Luzhou yóuzhǐsǎn's popularity diminished dramatically. In addition, due to the sophisticated procedures, the high production cost and low profit, not many young men were willing to commit to this art. In 2004, only about thirty experienced artisans were willing to continue this umbrella production. Many people worried that the skills may soon become extinct. In October 2005, an exhibition in Shanghai invited the local government to an exhibition of oil-paper umbrellas, and they have recovered some popularity since then.

After the recovery, Yunnan and Luzho minorities gained awareness of oil-paper umbrellas and used them during ceremonies and gifts. Since then, the umbrellas have been exported to Japan, Singapore, Korea, Hong Kong and Macau.

Contemporary local artisans still utilize the traditional method of yóuzhǐsǎn production, which includes the 70 or so procedures of total manual production. Such as slicing the bamboo and painting the pictures. Materials used are also orthodox to the traditional materials, such as the bamboo sticks directly brought from the mountains where they were chopped. Tools of production are old too; the black stone ink is already 450 years old. Quality control is strict; the four trenches should not meet and the tung oil must be spread evenly across the umbrella surface. The paintings adhere to the situations they are used for.

=== Jiangxi ===
Oil-paper umbrellas in the Wuyuan County of the Jiangxi province feature a traditional design and are known for their durability and portability. They are referred to as "金溪斗笠甲路傘; Jīnxī dǒulì Jiǎlù sǎn".

During the Song dynasty, a local resident of Jiangxi named "馬庭嵐; Mǎ Tínglán" was awarded the position chancellor, who then brought an oil-paper umbrella back to Jiangxi with him from a major city. One named "甲路人; Jiǎ Lùrén" improved upon the prototype and passed it on to his descendants. It was said that during the Ching dynasty when the Kangxi Emperor was on the throne, one day the Kangxi Emperor secretly traveled to Wuyuan and it was raining. Kangxi Emperor saw a child who threw a stone at the umbrella; however, the stone bounced back off from the umbrella without damaging it. Kangxi Emperor was surprised by the quality and strength of the oil-paper umbrella and gave it a positive name called the "Jialu paper umbrella Jia Tianxia" (甲路紙傘甲天下; Jiǎlù zhǐ sǎn jiǎ tiānxià). Since then they have been commonly called "Jialu umbrellas" (甲路傘; Jiǎlù sǎn).

Jialu umbrellas were awarded the first place during an international exhibition in 1936 and reached its peak at 1943, which recorded to have once produced 25,000 umbrellas and exported 17,000 annually. In 2000, however, only three eighty-year-old artisans have possessed the skill, in addition, one of the raw materials, the persimmon tree, is in danger of extinction. Jialu umbrellas have since become extinct. In 2006, the locals have produced a new and natural breed and increased the quality of Jialu yóuzhǐsǎn. Production reached 50,000 annually and exported to countries such as the United States, Japan, and Korea. Contemporarily, there are four factories located in Wuyuan with a net worth of eight million RMB, thirty villagers and 1,800 workers.

Jialu yóuzhǐsǎn are made from high-quality bamboo, skin paper, and tung oil. The main procedures are slicing the umbrella scaffold, cutting the umbrella portion, installing the umbrella sticks, boiling the umbrella stick, adding the skin paper, painting on the skin paper, editing the umbrella skin, brushing on tung oil, stitching the umbrella with decorations, installing the handle and the head. Altogether about thirty procedures.

=== Hunan ===
Oil-paper umbrellas in Changsha, Hunan province date back to about 100 years, the earliest oil-paper umbrella shop is 陶恆泰紙傘店, Which is named after Tao Jiqiao (陶季橋; Táo jì qiáo), who established the shop during the Qing dynasty.

In 1900, Liang Jingting (梁敬庭; Liáng Jìngtíng), who worked in an umbrella shop in Changsha opened his own umbrella shop called the Lianghongfa San (梁宏發傘; liánghóngfā sǎn). It produces the old type of oil, black ink umbrella. The name Xiangtan Muji Jing Gang You San (湘潭木屐 靖港油傘; xiāngtán mùjī jìng gǎng yóu sǎn) is attributed to its fine features and endurance. In 1921, the Pan Kuiqing (潘饋清; pān kuì qīng) brothers started a factory called Feifei San (菲菲傘; fēifēi sǎn) that mass-produces umbrella skin paper. The umbrella skin it produced included traditional flowered ones and many other pictures, these umbrellas were exported to Hong Kong, Macau and South East Asia. The umbrella was awarded in a Chinese exhibition in 1929. The highest production rate was thirty thousand per year, until February 1975 when Jing Gang Yusan She (靖港雨傘社; jìng gǎng yǔsǎn shè) was abolished, and Taohengmao (陶恆茂; táohéngmào) oil-paper umbrella production was terminated.

The raw materials of the Changsha oil-paper umbrella are skin paper, bamboo, cotton silk, rope, tung oil, persimmon water, pigment, cow horn, and wood. The umbrellas produced by Taohengmao (陶恆茂; táohéngmào) are especially fine-featured and commit to abide by the traditional production methods with strict materials.

=== Hubei ===
The Hankou, Hubei, province has produced oil-paper umbrellas for the past few hundred years. In 1864, Somun (Chinese: 蘇文; pinyin: Sūwén), who was originally from Hunan, invested in an umbrella shop. He later opened an official umbrella shop called Suhengtai Sandian (Chinese: 蘇恆泰傘店; pinyin: sūhéngtàisǎndiàn), with 12 workers and 3 apprentices in his employ. Production was at a rate of about 500-600 umbrellas per month. Somun also increased the umbrella's popularity locally, later expanding his business and amassing enormous profits.

Suhengtai (Chinese: 蘇恆泰; pinyin: sūhéngtài) oil-paper umbrella also became locally popular. It was once fashionable to buy umbrellas for weddings; the bride would hold a blue one while the groom would hold a red one with the combined connotation of a beautiful marriage. In 1970, the Sheng Tai oil-paper umbrella business died out. When in production, two types of materials were used: the scaffold was made from a special type of bamboo while the umbrella handle was made from a special type of wood from Hunan. The tung oil, skin paper, and persimmon oil used in production were all meticulously chosen. A Suhengtai oil-paper umbrella would last for about eight to twelve years.

=== Fujian ===
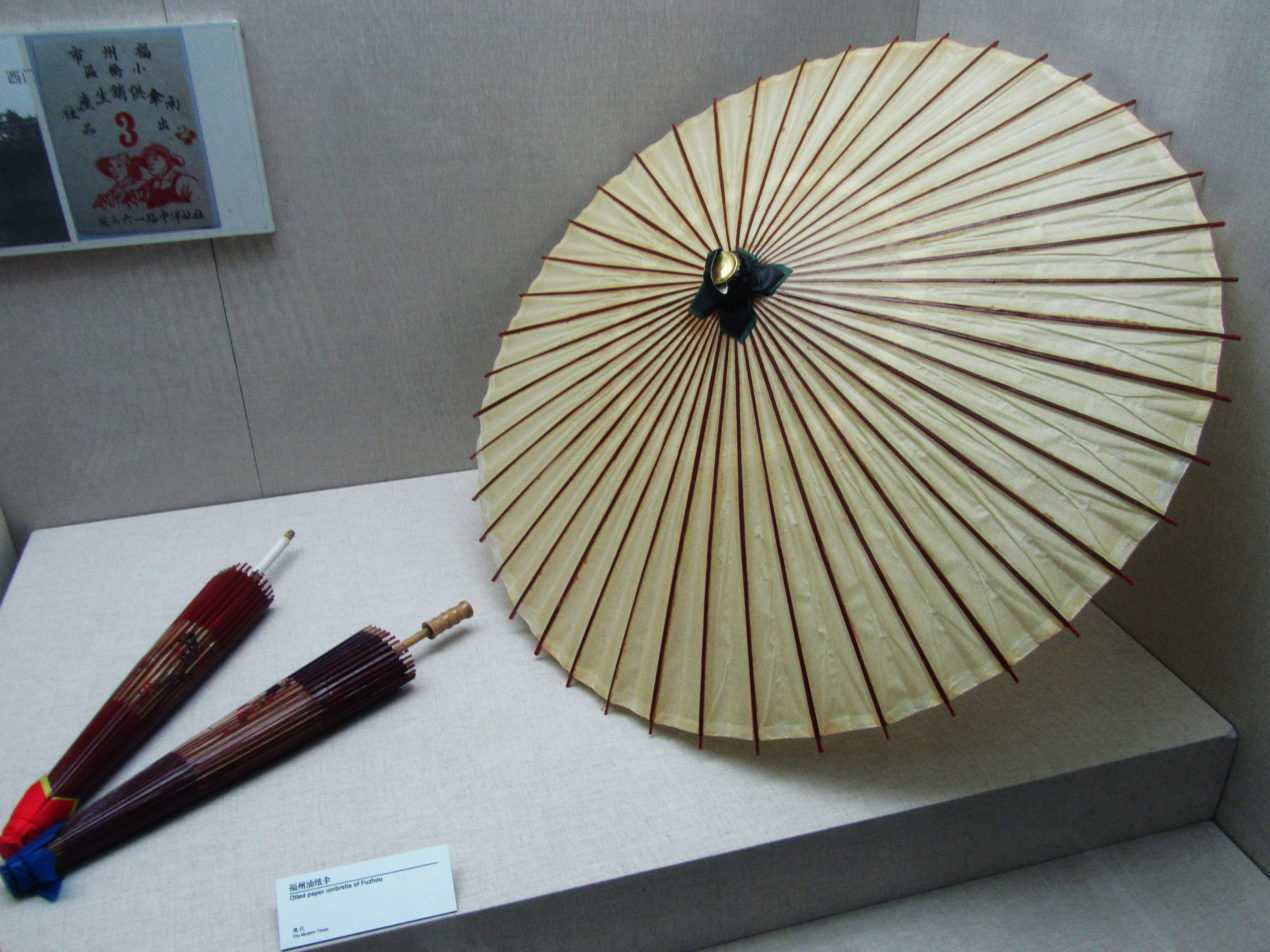
Oil-paper umbrella from Fuzhou

Oil-paper umbrella have been produced in both Fuzhou and Nanping of Fujian. The oil-paper umbrella is one of the three treasures in Fuzhou (福州三寶). The other two are the 脫胎漆器 (Lacquerware) and the 牛角梳 (combs made of cattle horn). Umbrellas play a large part in Fuzhou residents' daily lives, with local people calling it 包袱傘 – meaning literally "everyone's backpack has an umbrella in it". The oil-paper umbrellas of Nanping are famous alongside two other brands altogether known as the "three mouth" (三口), the other two mouths being 水口 and 閩清口. Production initiated in the 20th century with a peak pace of fifty thousand annually. Gradually, however, the traditional oil-paper umbrella was replaced by the collapsible umbrella in the 1970s. Local artisans have since switched to producing small and portable umbrellas. The umbrellas produced in Nanping are currently exported to Hong Kong, Macau, Taiwan, South East Asia, Europe, and America.

Fuzhou oil-paper umbrella materials are chosen strictly with only those of high quality permitted. The scaffold must be made from bamboo of the Northern Fujian province that has good elasticity and endurance; the bamboo must furthermore be at least five years old. 83 procedures are required for the manufacture of a single umbrella.

Traditional Fuzhou oil-paper umbrella art is divided into five subcategories including umbrella scaffold, umbrella installment, umbrella head, handle and painting, the mainstream of which is the umbrella installment. There are also a few famous local umbrella painters including 程家寶, 林永欽 and 劉夢秋.

The oil-paper umbrella in Fuzhou is dated to as long ago as the Five Dynasties and Ten Kingdoms period. When 王審知 established his own kingdom called "閩國" (Fujian) at Fuzhou, he brought the oil-paper umbrella from Zhejiang with him. During the Ching dynasty, there were as many as 300 shops in Fuzhou. The oil-paper umbrella was also one of the symbols used in riots against the Japanese during the Xinhai revolution.

The oil-paper umbrella in Fuzhou was famous for its endurance in an expo in Panama in 1915 and Chicago in 1933.

In 1985, the Fuzhou oil-paper umbrella has had significant improvement and advancement and was exported to Japan, Europe and South East Asia. Every umbrella has 72 sticks in the scaffold, opens wide and closes tightly giving it a snake-like appearance, thus giving it the nickname the "Snake Umbrella".

In 1990, a government official, 林愛枝, went to Seattle for an umbrella exhibition, and a red umbrella he showed provoked a great response in the audience. However, the Fuzhou umbrella shop closed down in 1997, resulting in low production with minor exports to Japan. Though local umbrella artisans are already occupied with other jobs, they still petition for the local government's assistance in the recovery of this art.

Nowadays, the oil-paper umbrella has become a form of popular art and decoration. There are workshops and lessons for people to paint on the umbrellas in the traditional way. The umbrellas also serve as an important element of interior design in Fujian, with it being common to see them displayed in such places as high-end restaurants and hotels, people's houses, and museums.

=== Yunnan ===
Oil-paper umbrella production in Tengchong, Yunnan, dates back to two-hundred years ago, or nine generations, also called the 紙撐子 (Paper Support). It was rumored that 鄭以公 who once met two umbrella artisans and learned the skills from them brought the skills with him back to Tengchong, and passed it on to his descendants. In the past, oil-paper umbrella spread across all markets in Tengchong. The local Hakka especially liked the oil-paper umbrellas. The village chief 鄭傳國 said that once 80% of the villagers knew how to make oil-paper umbrellas, but now only four that are still making them. The current best production household is the 鄭家朝, who is picky about the material and techniques. Tung oil and persimmon water are made adhering to the traditional methods of production. The final umbrella is elegant and strong. The production rate is about one to two per day. 鄭映樓, who only makes big umbrellas likes to place big umbrellas in front of his shop to shed the sun and attract customers, therefore also named the "shed shop umbrella" (照舖傘). They only produce umbrellas when they have free time from farm works currently.

The oil-paper umbrellas produced in Tengchong are finely tuned, abundant with colors and beautiful outlook. They were once sold in other provinces of China. However, there has been a gradual decrease in production during the 1950s. The oil-paper umbrella production now is only to pass on the skills to prevent the extinction of this handcraft locally.

The oil-paper umbrella uses special bamboos and wood translocated from 雲華 (Yunhua) and 古永 (Guyon) as umbrella handle and scaffold. The umbrella surface uses skin bought from 界頭 (Jietou). Brushed with tung oil, named the green cloth (綠衣子). Procedures including slicing bamboo scaffold, stitching, surface skin, brushing persimmon water, collapsing the scaffold, drying the umbrella, painting, installing the handle, brushing tung oil, adding clothes, stitching again. It averages out about two umbrella a day.

=== In customs and cultural ceremonies ===
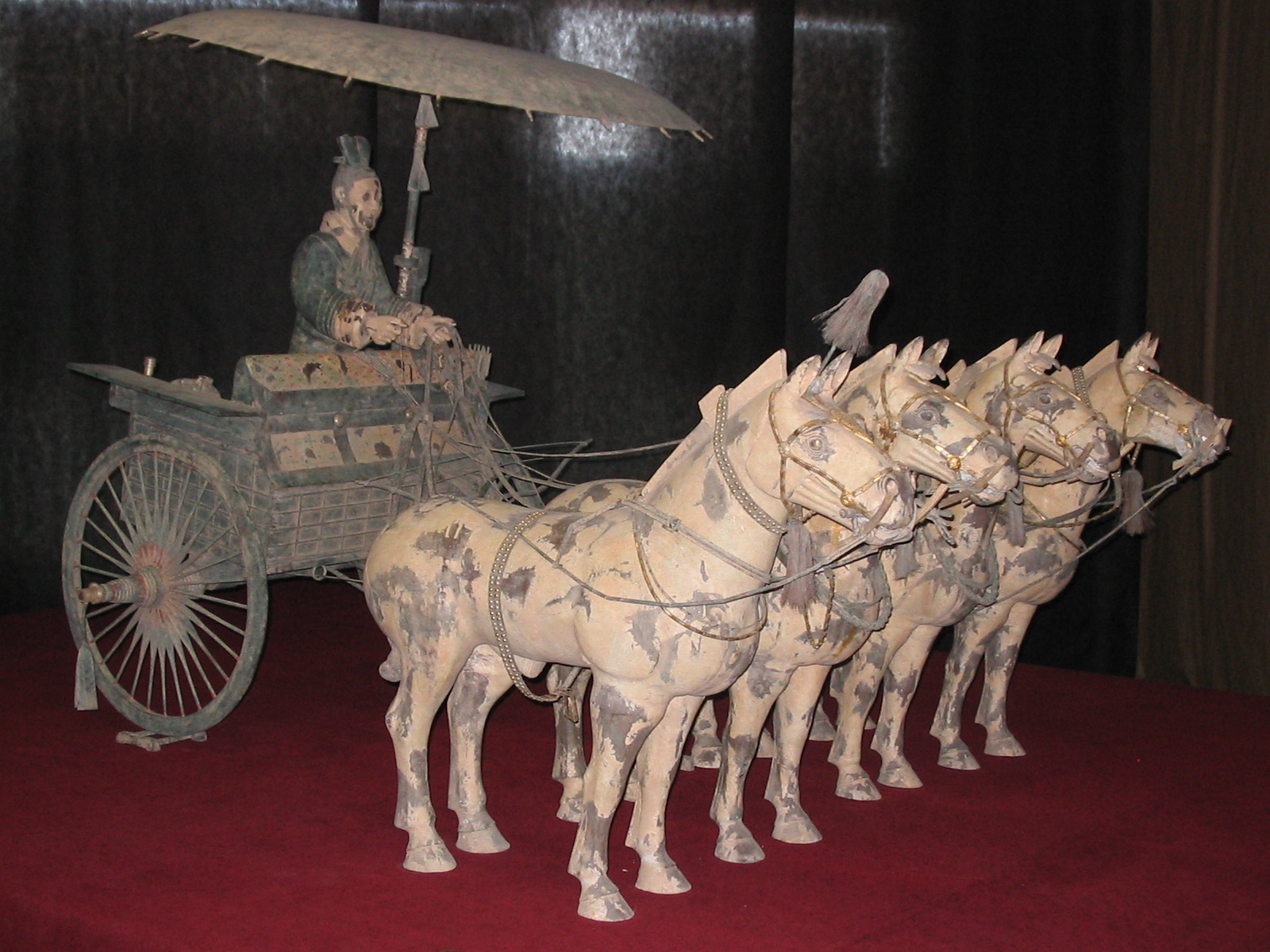
Terracotta Army

==== Hakka marriage and bride dowry ====
In traditional Hakka marriages, the bride's parents must pay dowry to the husband's family, in which oil-paper umbrella is one of the required dowries. "紙" (paper) is a homonym for "子" (sons) in Chinese, for the connotation of having sons early. The character "傘" (umbrella) contains five "人" (man) with the connotation of many sons and grandsons. Oil-paper umbrella is straight up, with the symbol to eradicate evil spirits. The circular appearance symbolizes "fullness" connotation of a beautiful marriage. And since the umbrella itself can shield rain and the wind, thus prohibiting evil spirits from entering in. Other dowries that come with the oil-paper umbrella include five colored pants, make up the table, door curtain, and boxes. In wealthier families, dowries could include gold and jewelry or high-quality cloth or blankets. In addition, bride family would give vegetables that have homonym with positive words such as celery, garlic, and chives, that are then tied with red rope given as gifts to the husband's family. Oil-paper umbrella as a dowry is still a custom in the Hakka family in Taiwan and some other countries in South East Asia.

==== Hakka second burial funerals ====
Since many of the Hakka populations are in the mountainous areas of China, most corpses are buried on the mountains. Initially, Hakka people do not put up a gravestone, however, after the second time the corpse is buried (usually 3–5 years later), the additional grander ceremony is added. When burying, usually in the eighth month of the Chinese calendar, an experienced burial master is hired to dig into the old grave and disinter the clean bones for an official and permanent burial at the exact spot. The oil-paper umbrella is used to cover the bones while they are being cleaned.

==== Engagement present of the Yao people ====
In the population of Yao located in Longhui County of Hunan, oil-paper umbrella is used as an engagement present by the men side. When a consensus is built between the two families, the family of the man's side would hire an experienced man to propose a marriage in the woman's house. The first propose does not require any gift but only the permission of the parents of the bride. During the day of engagement, the man's side needs to bring an oil-paper umbrella to the woman's house and place it on the sacred table located in the house; the bride must take the umbrella from the table personally and close the umbrella that is stitched with 12 triangles. Then the experienced man must bring the oil-paper umbrella back to the husband's house for the proof of a successful engagement. On the way back, the experienced man must not open the umbrella himself. If a divorce is made later, the husband must return the string on the stitch back to the bride.

==== Funerals of the Dai people ====
Dai people located in Yunnan use a special type of paper called "嘎拉沙" (Garcia) to make oil-paper umbrella, which is brushed with sesame oil. The Dai believe that the umbrella could lead the dead to heaven. This type of umbrella is still available in a village today.

==== Hakka dance ceremony ====
"Umbrella Dance" is one of the traditional dances of the Hakka culture, during the ceremony, the dancer must be holding a paper umbrella and wearing a blue shirt (traditional Hakka clothing). Hakka Dance Ceremony is an important part of the Hakka Culture along with "tea leaf drama" and "mountain song".

== In Taiwan ==
Oil-paper umbrella has been the cultural symbol of the Hakka in Meinong District of Kaohsiung. The production procedures are divided into five major portions. This includes the umbrella scaffold, umbrella production, umbrella head, umbrella handle and art painting. With any one of the above been done, the umbrella could be called as a "full art" (全藝).

=== History and modifications ===
Oil-paper umbrella production in Meinong initiation has two rumors.

- One was that it started during the Japanese rule, during which, Lin (林阿貴) and Wu (吳振興) invited oil-paper umbrella artisans from mainland China to Taiwan for the purpose of passing the skills to the locals.
- The other was that oil-paper umbrella artisan Guo (郭玉琴) have arrived in Taiwan from Guangdong province. Since then, he had permanently stayed in the Meinong district and spread the skills locally. Early Meinong oil-paper umbrella factor was called "廣" (pronounced "Young") for connotations of wealth, wide and progression. In 1960, oil-paper umbrella, tobacco leaves, and rice were Meinong district's major income sources. At that time, it was the renaissance of oil-paper umbrella. It was estimated that there were at least twenty factories producing twenty thousand oil-paper umbrellas annually. However, with the rapid industrialization in Taiwan, mechanically produced Western umbrellas have replaced them in attribute to low cost, longevity, and portability. Taiwan has become the key country of Western umbrella production and forced many traditional handmade oil-paper umbrella factories out of business.

In 1970, an English journal used the Goung (廣進勝) oil-paper umbrella pioneer, Lin (林享麟) and his umbrella as the magazine cover, along with a detailed article on the culture and production of oil-paper umbrella. BBC have also included a series of recording of the oil-paper umbrella called the "Long Search". In addition, 1983, famous Hakka movie producer, Lin Fu-De (林福地), have incorporated the oil-paper umbrella into his drama, Star Knows My Heart. When the drama was played in the Japanese television, Taiwanese oil-paper umbrella gained impression in the Japanese, who have ordered a large quantity for imports. After 1980, with the increase of Taiwan overall financial status, Meinong's increased tourism, oil-paper umbrella have recovered its utility in the daily life along with its value as a local culture and travel souvenir.

=== Production and materials ===
Meinong oil-paper umbrella scaffolds are made mainly from bamboo sticks, which are translocated from places such as Puli, Zhushan, Nantou County and the Cishan District of Kaohsiung. Especially the famous moso bamboo of the Qushan district. Moso bamboo is famous for its strength and elasticity. Thus the scaffold is mainly made of moso bamboo. Prior to production, most bamboo is soaked in water to eliminate the sugar for a month. Then they are dried under the sun to prevent infection of bugs. After cutting and slicing, they become the fundamental scaffold of the umbrella, with additional modifications such as umbrella head, handle and hole drilling for stitching. After the scaffold production, the wax is applied onto the surface as well as the sides. Then persimmon oil, sun bake, painting, handle installment, umbrella head fixed, stitched for a finalized oil paper umbrella.

== In Japan ==
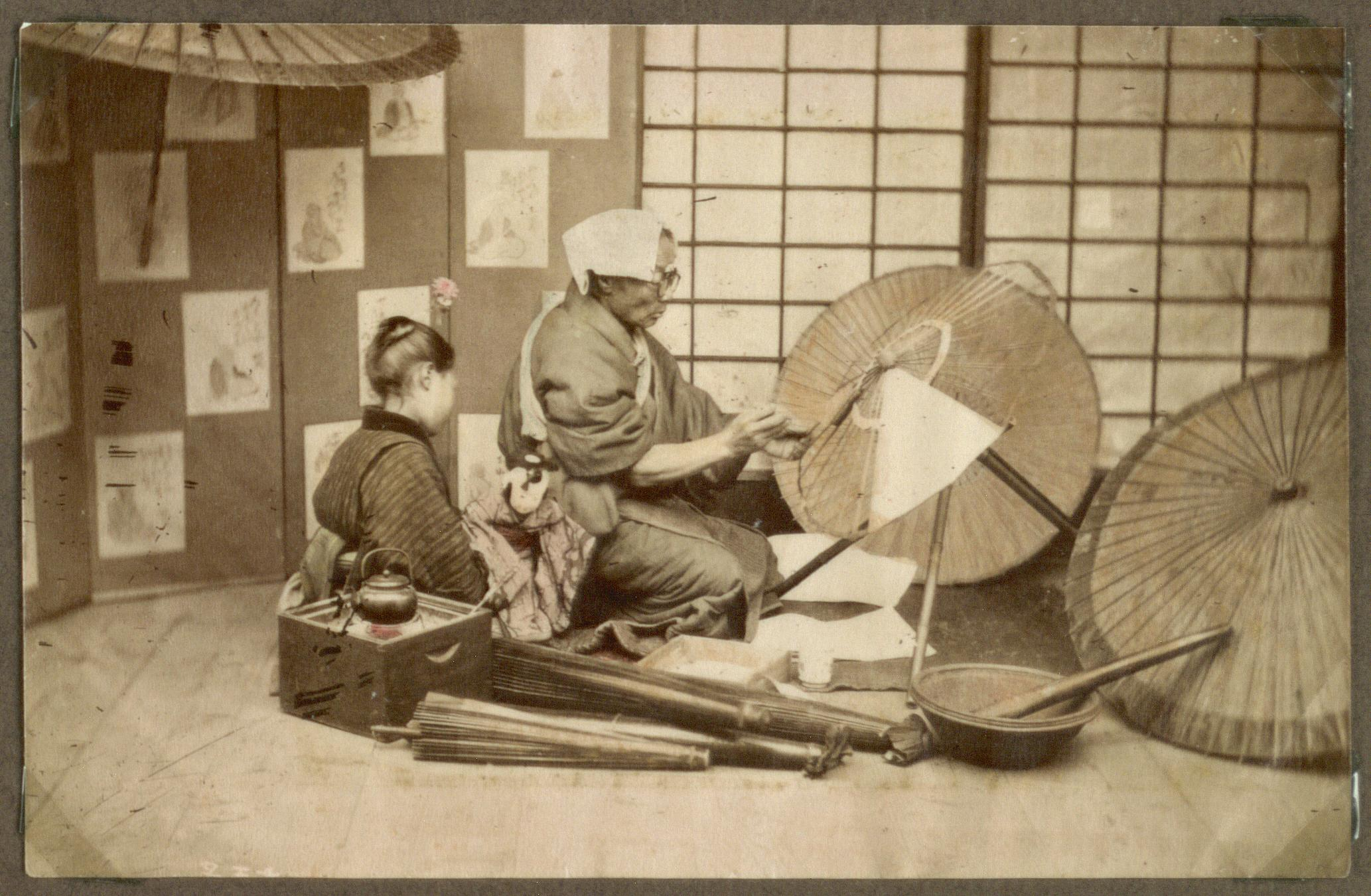
Umbrella making as a home industry

Oil-paper umbrellas are often known in Japanese as wagasa (Japanese: 和傘; "Japanese umbrella"), and these with a bull's-eye design are called janomegasa (Japanese: 蛇の目傘; "snake-eye umbrella"). The handle and scaffold are often colored black, however, sometimes other colors are applied as well. The surface paintings include traditional Japanese culture, gained popularity from the Azuchi–Momoyama period to Edo period. (Note: A part of wagasa was excavated at Kōfu Jōkamachi Site (甲府城下町遺跡) in Kōfu, Yamanashi, Japan, where the area was a castle town during the rule of feudal lord Takeda Shingen in the 16th century.)

=== History ===
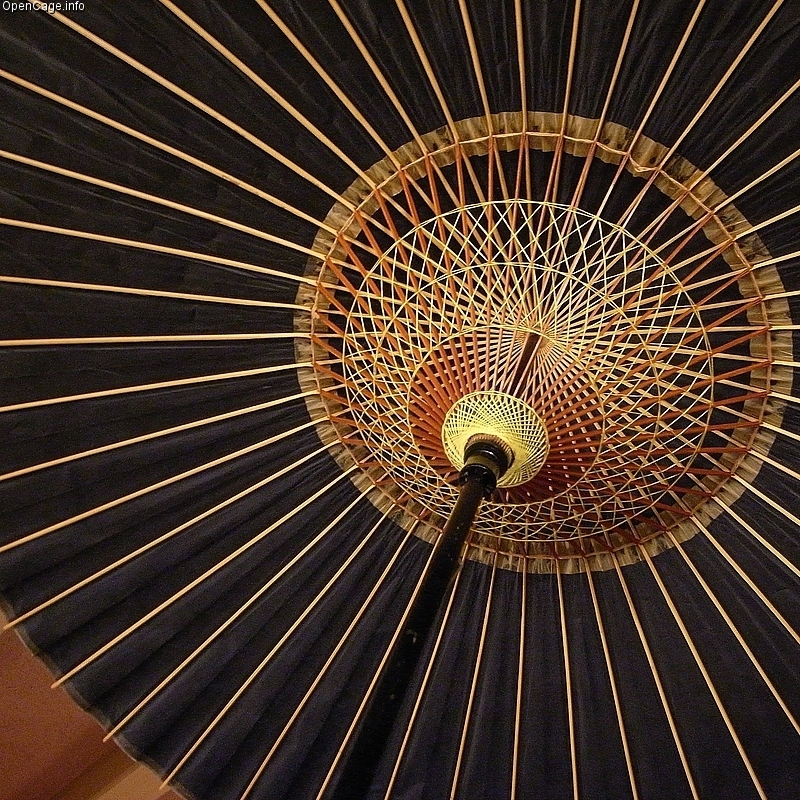
The underside of a Japanese oil-paper umbrella

The origin of oil-paper umbrellas could be traced to those fabric canopies brought from Korea to Japan during the Asuka period, which samples are preserved among the Shōsōin treasures. Initially, the oil-paper umbrella was a sacred instrument in Buddhist ceremony. During the Heian period, techniques in paper production and bamboo work advanced. In the Muromachi period, pigments and wax were applied to the surface of the paper for additional resistance to water.

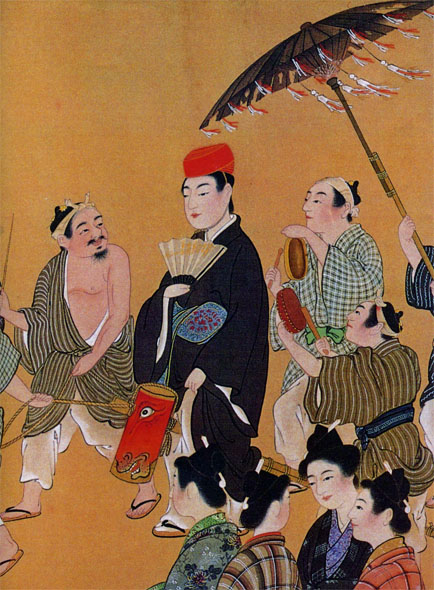
Oil-paper umbrella used in weddings in Ryūkyū

During the Azuchi-Momoyama period, Luzon Sukezaemon introduced an umbrella with a shield from the Philippines, which contributed the popularity of the wages. During the Genroku era, modifications were made to enhance its utility to specific circumstances. Some monks and doctors used shorter and thicker umbrellas with business trademarks or logos on them, then lent them to customers as an advertisement. Umbrellas also became the geisha's tool as well. In addition, some unemployed Edo period samurai crafted oil-paper umbrellas as a secondary occupation. A famous example is the Ajima-kasa (阿島傘), made in Nagano Prefecture, which is still made there.

However, with the popularity of Western umbrellas in the Meiji period, oil-paper umbrellas have diminished markets today, with only a few locations producing it, such as Kyoto, Gifu Prefecture and Yodoe, Tottori Prefecture.

Tsujikura is the oldest shop of the oil-paper umbrella in Japan.

=== Kyoto ===
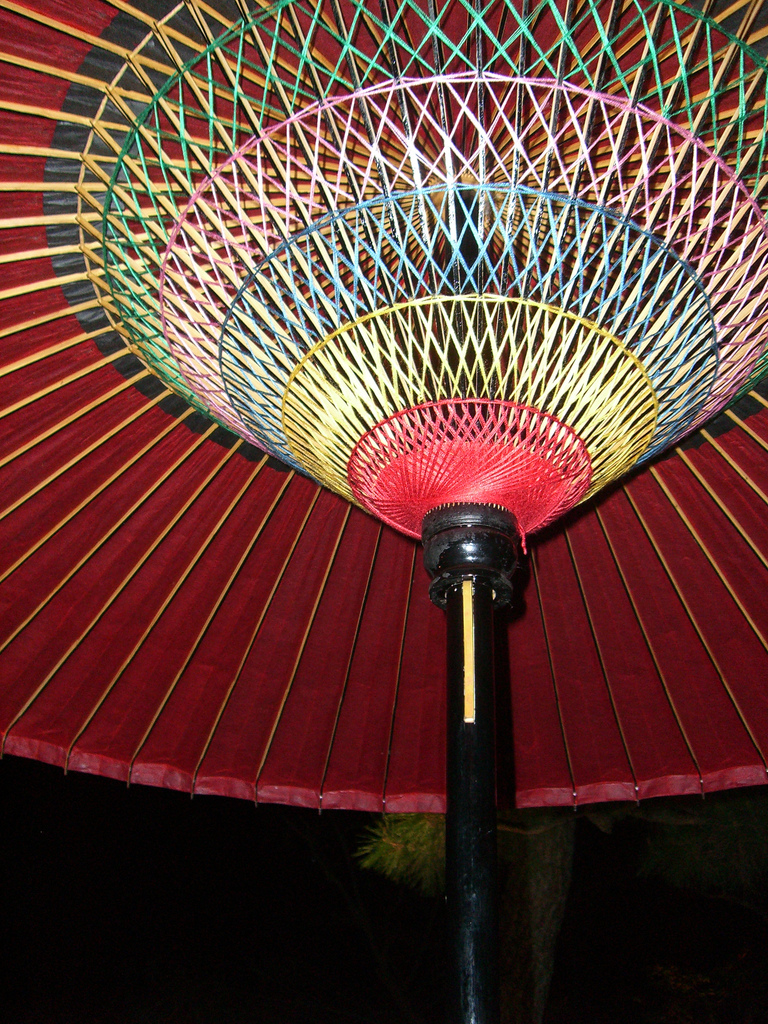
Kyō wagasa, a traditional umbrella of Kyoto, Japan.

A style of oil-paper umbrella in Kyoto is called kyōwagasa (京和傘). It is completely handmade, colors and images are of Japanese features, materials are also strictly controlled. The handle and scaffold are made from bamboo of Kameoka, Kyoto; the umbrella skin is made from Meinong paper of Gifu. The surface of the umbrella skin is brushed with sesame oil and tied with fine strings. An experienced artisan usually produces ten to twenty kyowagasa a month. One umbrella style has concentric circles on the exterior side of the umbrella skin called the janomegasa (蛇の目傘), which literally means eye of a snake.

=== Gifu ===
Oil-paper umbrella production in Gifu started around 1750. Every oil-paper umbrella made in Gifu goes through over a hundred procedures. During the Shōwa period, the production in Gifu reached its peak at about fifteen million annually. Today, the production is only about a few tens of thousands per year.

=== Yodoe ===
Oil-paper umbrella production started in Yodoe, Tottori in 1821, by the Kurayoshiya (倉吉屋). During the Meiji period, the production in Yodoe was only about a few thousand annually. However, due to the abundance and accessibility of bamboo and other raw materials, during the Taishō period, production by factories increased 71% and a net production of 17,000 Wagasa annually. Most areas in western Japan regularly used the Yodoe Wagasa.

=== In Japanese culture ===
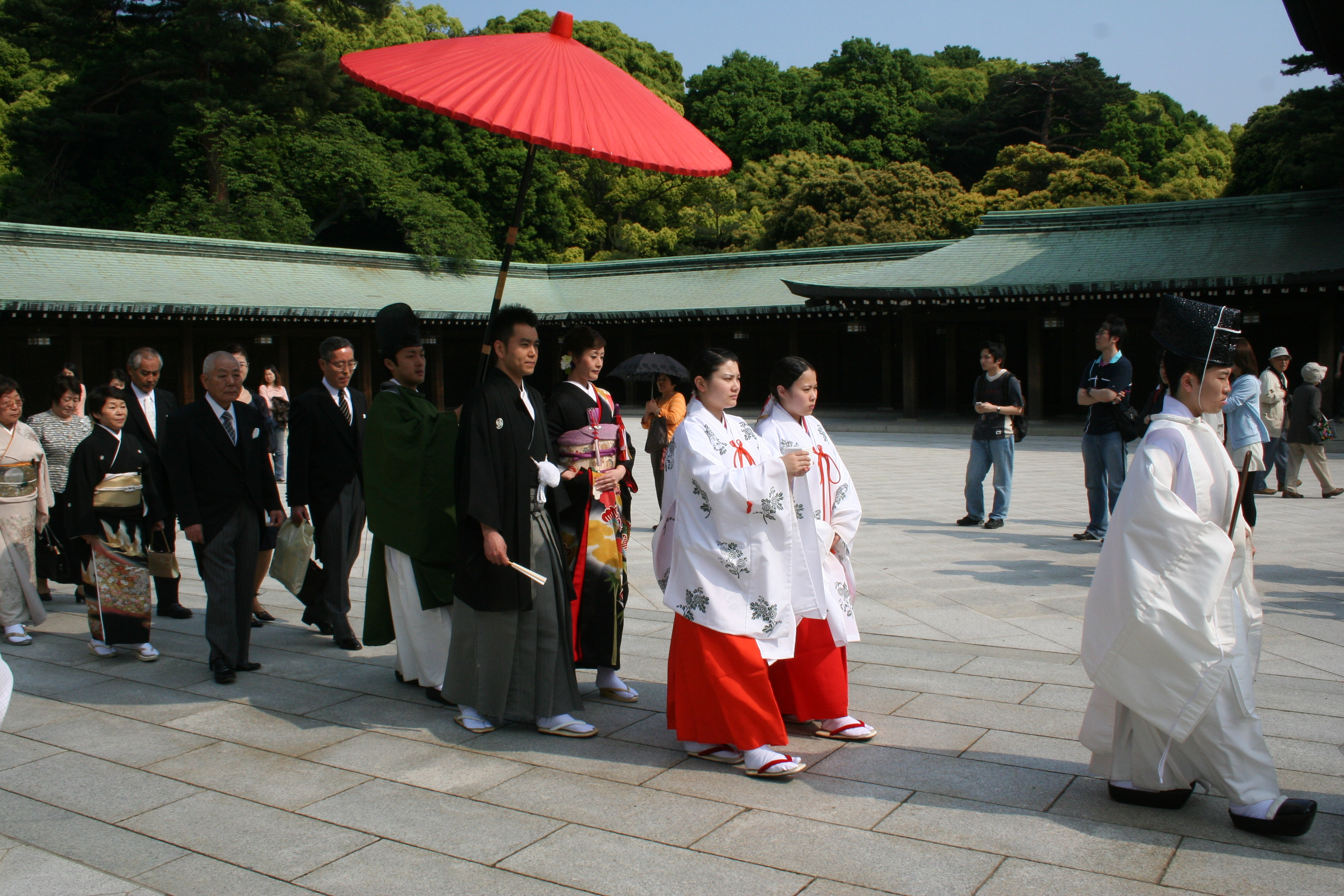
Oil-paper umbrella at a wedding ceremony

Other than its utility, oil-paper umbrellas appear quite often in Japanese culture, and are often associated with geisha, traditional dance, tea ceremony, and daily utility including wedding ceremony. Oil-paper umbrella shops in Gion have classified their customers into categories for different styles of oil-paper umbrella:

- Geisha use purple
- Dancers use pink
- Middle aged clients like green or red
- Men and elderly use dark blue
- Actors tend to pick black or brown

Different colors have different connotations and symbolism; in traditional weddings, brides are usually covered under a red oil-paper umbrella.

In tea a red parasol called nodatekasa (野点傘) is used for outdoor occasions (nodate).

== In Korea ==
Korea also traditionally used oil-paper umbrellas. Oil-paper umbrellas are mainly called Jiusan (지우산; 紙雨傘) in Korea. Korean oil-paper umbrellas are characterized by the use of Korean paper in a variety of colours.

=== History ===
For a long time, umbrellas have been favored in Korea as symbols of the status and authority of royalty and aristocrats. For example, a mural of Goguryeo's Anak Tomb No. 3 depicts a servant holding a huge umbrella for the king. Even during the Goryeo Dynasty, only high class people used an umbrella called Jangryanghyang Usan (장량향우산; 張良項羽傘) when going out.

The exact time period when oil-paper umbrellas began to be used in Korea is unclear, but at least during the Joseon Dynasty, paper umbrellas were certainly used. The 18th-century Joseon Dynasty Uigwe states that royal umbrella craftsmen needed materials such as bamboo, high-quality Korean paper called chojuji (초주지; 草注紙), and perilla oil when making umbrellas. There is no significant difference from the materials used by modern oil-paper umbrella craftsmen.

Until the Joseon Dynasty, umbrellas were only available to the upper class. In particular, the king's official trip was always accompanied by umbrellas. The Uigwe also recorded the names of umbrella craftmen belonging to the royal family. In the case of Gojong of Korea, as many as 50 umbrella craftsmen were employed. And more expensive and luxurious Korean paper was used to show the royal family's dignity. When a respected official retired, he was given a silk umbrella called Man-in-san (만인산; 萬人傘) with his name engraved on it to honor his merit.

Towards the end of the Joseon Dynasty, oil-paper umbrellas were more common than before. Among the Gasa (poetry) of Joseon in the 19th century, an oil paper umbrella called Chailsan(차일산; 遮日傘) is often mentioned in Hanyang-ga(한양가; 漢陽歌), which depicts Joseon's gwageo examination sites. Its diameter is up to 3 meters and height up to 2.2 meters, big enough to fit five to six adult men together. It was used as a parasol or portable tent to avoid the sun, and also used for positioning. By the late Joseon Dynasty, the number of gwageo exam takers increased and the competition rate intensified. At this time, the closer the position was to the exam question, the more advantageous it was, so diligent takers took the position with a large umbrella in advance.

Meanwhile, even until the late Joseon Dynasty, ordinary people used asian conical hat and traditioonal raincoats "dorong-i" rather than umbrellas. In 1950, after the Korean War, commoners began to use oil-paper umbrellas as daily necessities. And they become more widely popular and were commonly used in everyday life until the 1960s.

In particular, Korea's Jiu-san cultural industry flourished greatly in Jeonju, Jeollabuk-do. Jeonju is famous for its high quality Korean paper and has a bamboo forest in Damyang, a nearby area of Jeonju; so good umbrella materials were readily available. In the 1960s, there were about 30 umbrella factories in Jeonju's Jangjae Village. However in the 1970s, oil-paper umbrellas have gradually disappeared in Korea due to the emergence of more durable modern umbrellas.

Currently, the only craftsman who makes oil-paper umbrellas resides in Jeonju, Jeollabuk-do. Their production was designated as an intangible cultural property in 2011 and continues to exist in South Korea. In the past, Korean oil-paper umbrellas were in high demand, so craftmen were able to mass-produce them through a thorough division of labor and make a profit. However, now that the number of buyers and producers has decreased, the price of umbrellas has become relatively expensive because very few people are in charge of all the manufacturing processes.

== In Thailand ==
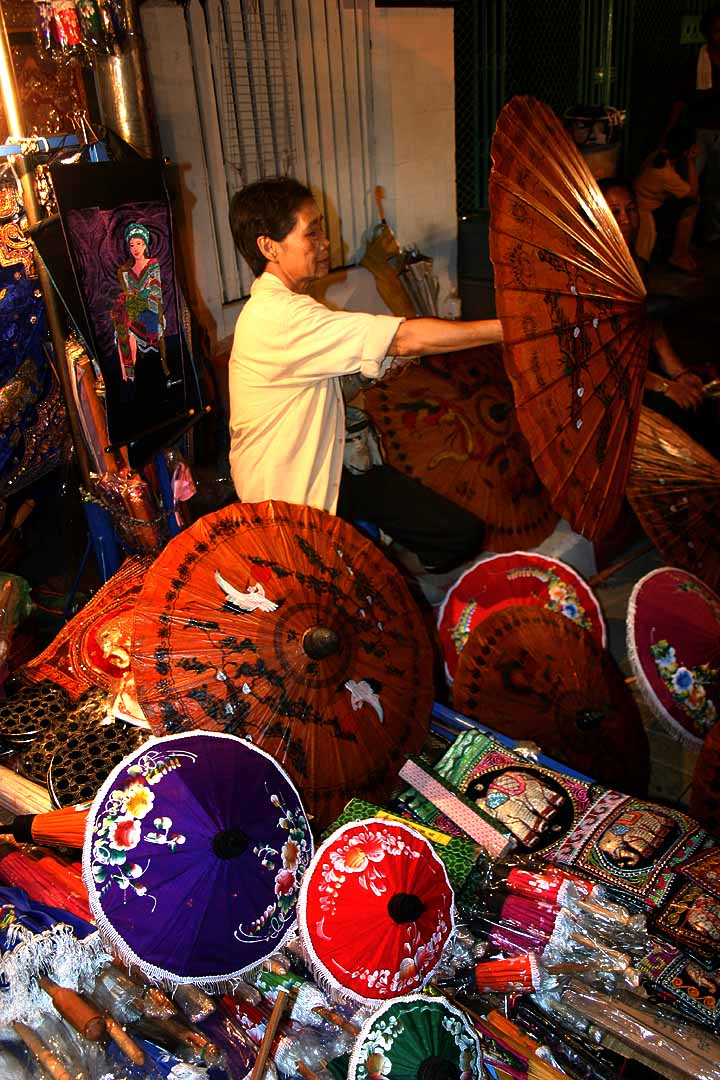
Umbrella stand at the Sunday market, Chiangmai

Oil-paper umbrella art in the Northern Thailand, or Chiang Mai dates back to around two hundred years. The umbrella scaffold is made from green bamboo sticks, the colors and images are abundant including pictures of scenery, animals, people and flowers. The umbrella surfaces can have a square shape in addition to the traditional circular one. Oil-paper umbrellas in Thailand have unique features, which often entice tourists to buy them. Of the several types, the most famous are the ones made in the Bo Sang village. Most farmers produce oil-paper umbrellas during their free time in specialized factories.

=== History and modifications ===
The rumors of the local people have guessed that the oil-paper umbrella has been brought into Thailand by the Bamar. Long ago, a monk in Thailand named "Pra In that" who practiced Buddhism in "Wat Bo Sang" temple and traveled a lot. One time as he approached near the Northern border of Burma and stayed there for a few days, the Thai people there accommodated him while his stay. During a time when Pra In that ate his breakfast, a Bamar gave him an umbrella along with the prayer of the monk. The monk thought the umbrella was very convenient and was curious for how it was made, he decided to learn to make the umbrella. Thus he visited the village that was specialized in the production of umbrella located in Burma. Pra In that recorded the detailed production procedures and brought it with him back to Wat Bo Sang temple.

After arriving back at Wat Bo Sang, Pra In that was on a hunt for the needed materials to produce the umbrella, with some assistance of the villagers, they were able to make the first umbrella in Thailand. Initially, not many villagers were motivated to make umbrellas, however, once they found the convenience of it, many were attracted to mass-produce and buying it. Oil-paper umbrella production became one of the major sources of income for the Bo Sang village.

In 1941, Bo Sang villagers have cooperated and established the "Bo Sang Umbrella Making Cooperative Ltd.". The chief of the company is Jamroon Suthiwiwat. The company is specialized in making umbrella of different sizes such as 14, 16, 18, 20, 35, 40 inches and even bigger umbrella. In 1957, Governmental association "Center for Industrial Promotion for the North" have assisted the villagers and improved their production techniques.

=== Production and materials ===
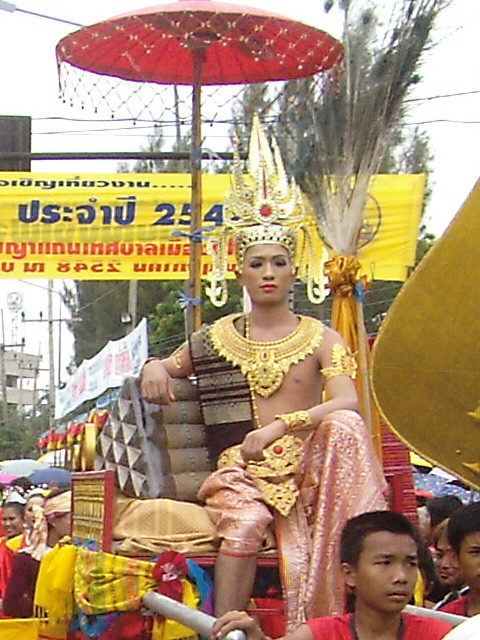
Phangki, son of Nāga under an oil-paper umbrella

The umbrella skin is made from the tree skin of morus plant called "sa". Morus skin is cooked to soft, washed, smashed, washed and bleached. It is covered in cloth to increase the thickness. Then dried under the sun. Oil-paper umbrella production is all handmade including slicing the bamboo stick, combining the umbrella scaffold, addition of the skin, painting, and drying. Bo Sang umbrella use oil paint to paint and are all painted completely by hand.

=== Umbrella festival ===
The oil-paper umbrella festival takes place in Chiang Mai during the January or February of every year. It is one of the most popular festivals and attracts a lot of tourists. The festival mainly takes place in the streets of Bo Sang, every place in the village are decorated with oil-paper umbrella. There are also competitions taking place between artisans and artists of the oil-paper umbrella, prizes are awarded to the winners. Women from the Bo Sang village performs the bicycle show with the oil-paper umbrella and are simultaneously competing for "Miss Bo Sang" of the year.

== In Vietnam ==
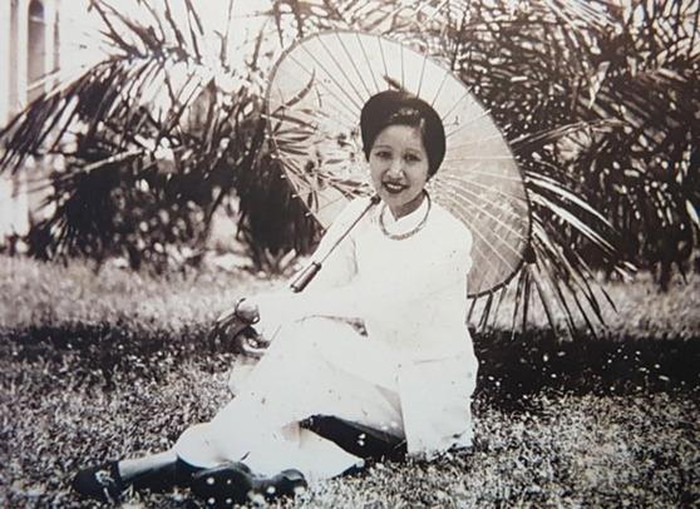
Artist Lê Thị Lựu is using oil paper umbrellas

Vietnamese people also have a long tradition of using oil-paper umbrellas.

== Gallery ==
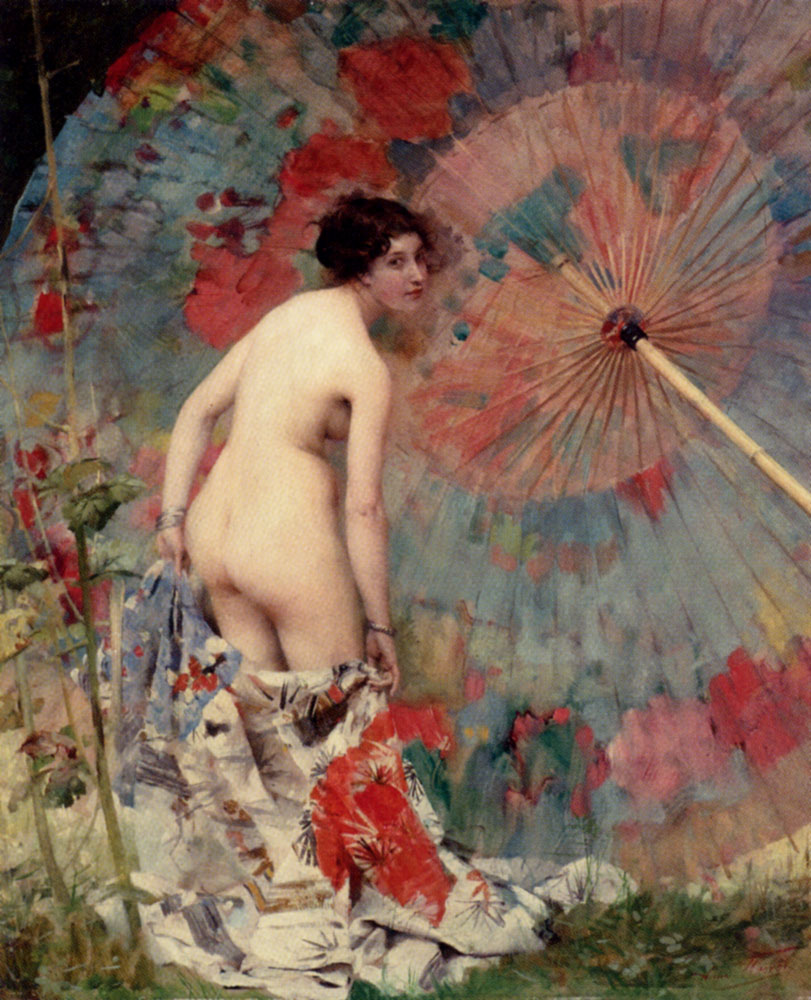
Aimé Morot, Nude with a Japanese Umbrella

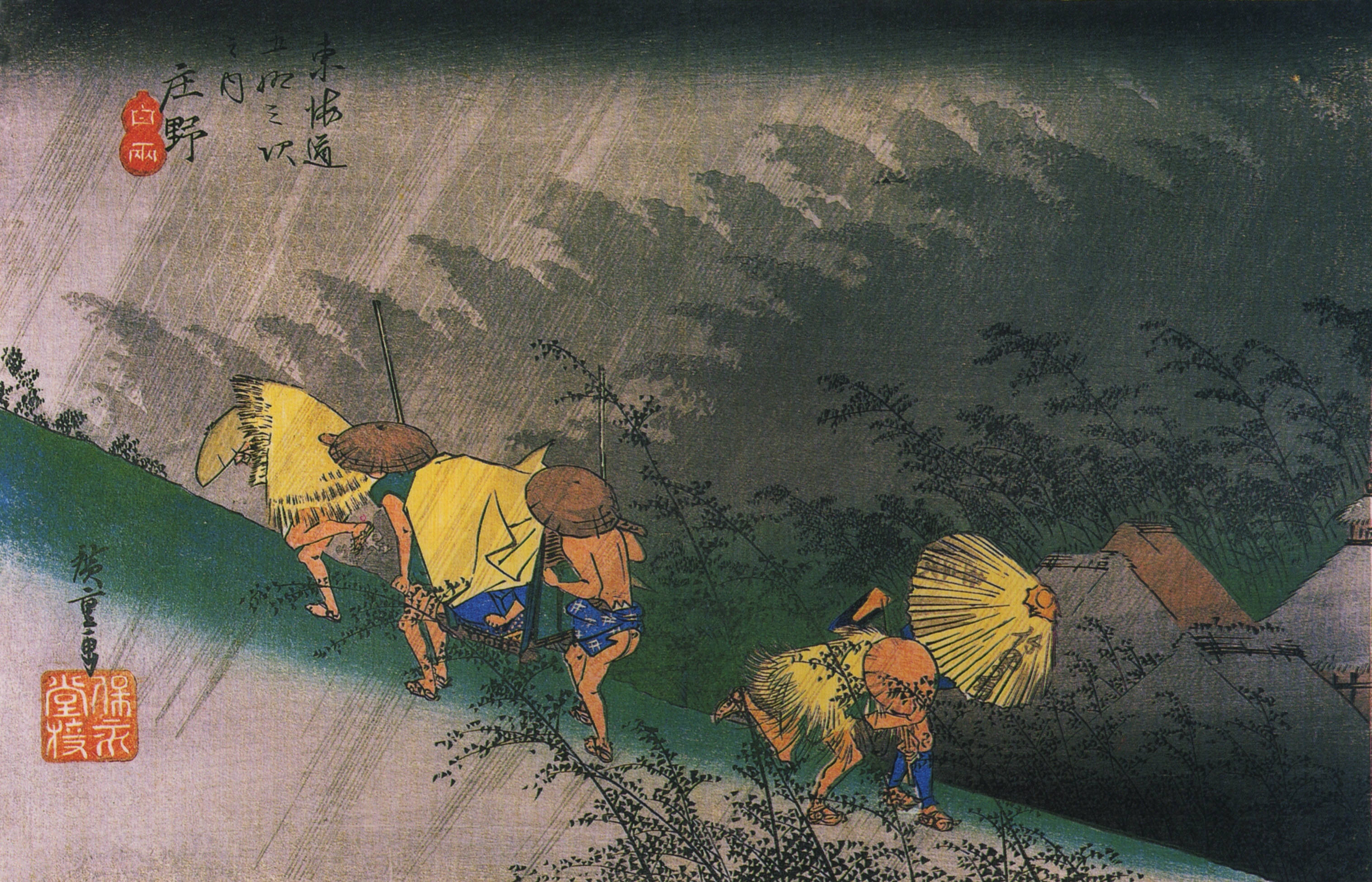
Hiroshige, The Fifty-three Stations of the Tōkaidō, Rain Shower at Shōno

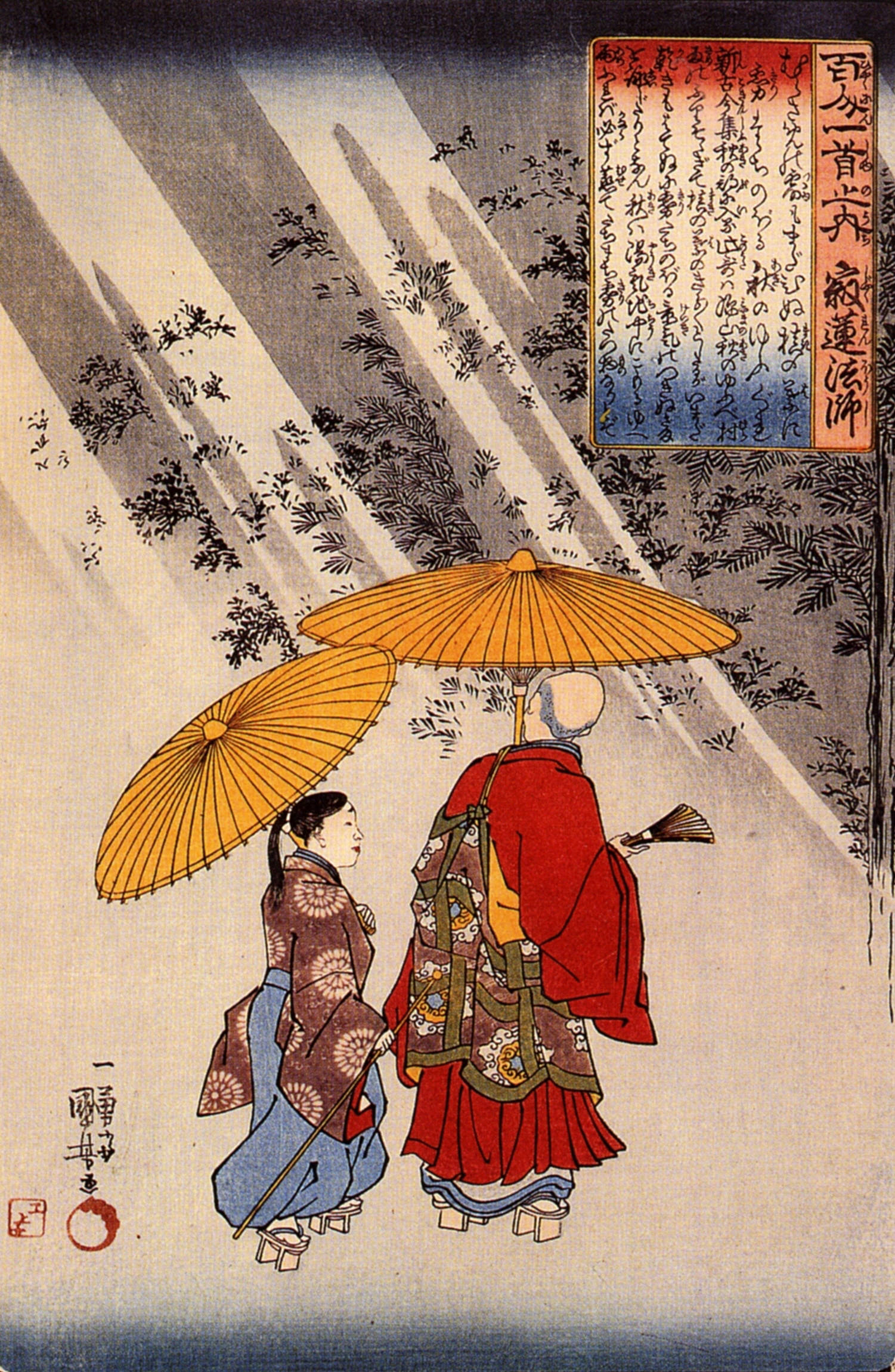
Hyakunin Isshu by Kuniyoshi. Jakuren and a companion strolling in a grove of yew trees

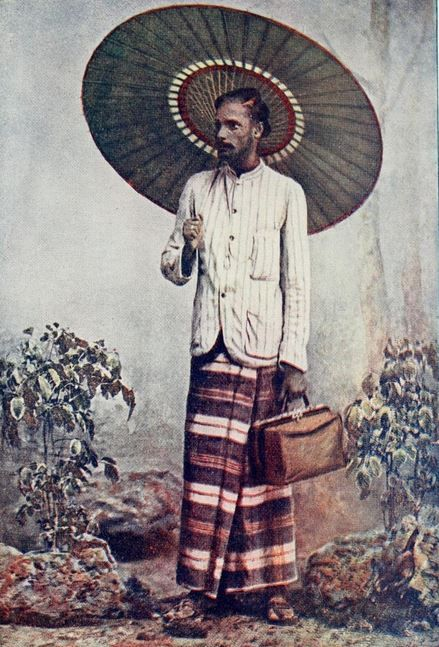
Reproduction of a hand coloured photograph of a Sinhalese man in Mumbai, 1897

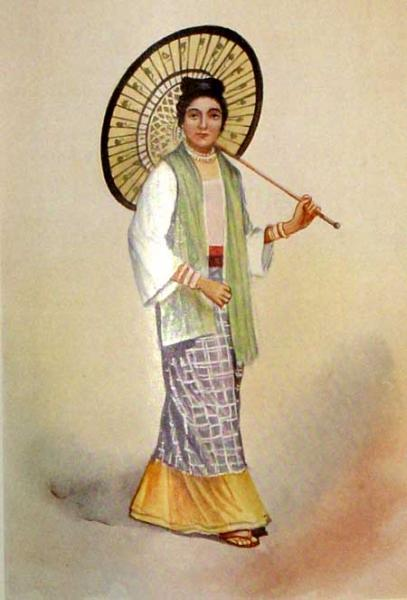
From Burmah a watercolor by Rao Bahadur M. V. Dhurandhar depicting a Burmese woman from Myanmar

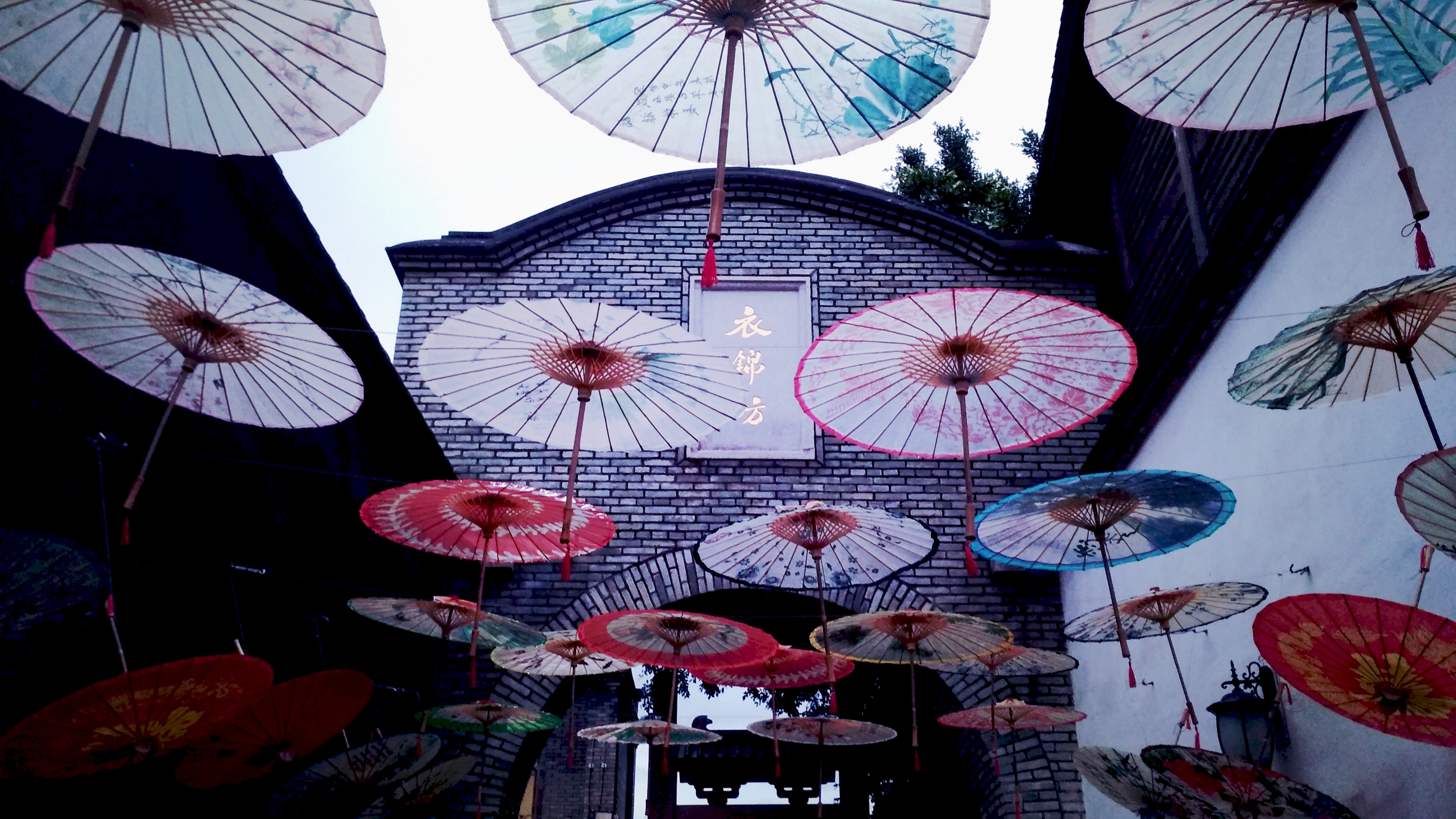
Oil paper umbrella art in southern China

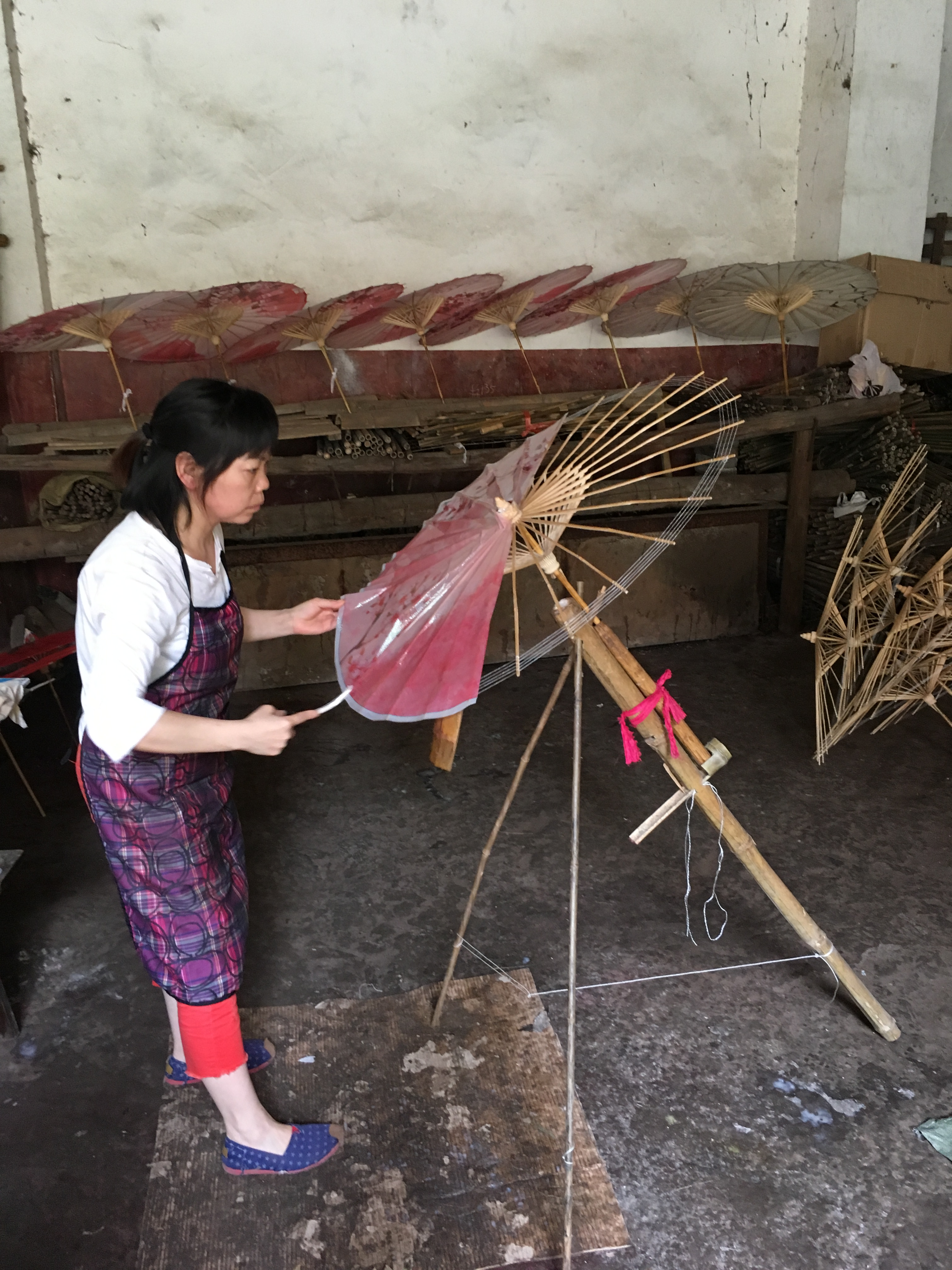
Paper parasol artisan in southern China

== See also ==
- Cocktail umbrella
- Kittisol
- Payung mesikhat
- Gifu umbrellas
