= List of shipwrecks in March 1851 =

The list of shipwrecks in March 1851 includes ships sunk, foundered, wrecked, grounded, or otherwise lost during March 1851.

== 1 March ==
List of shipwrecks: 1 March 1851
| Ship | State | Description |
|---|---|---|
| Jane | United Kingdom | The brig ran aground on the Nantucket Shoals, off the coast of Massachusetts, United States. She was on a voyage from Alexandria, Egypt to Halifax, Nova Scotia, British North America. She was refloated and beached on the coast of Massachusetts. She was consequently condemned. |
| Justina | United Kingdom | The ship was driven ashore and wrecked at Gopaulpore, India. |
| Sarah | United Kingdom | The ship ran aground at Newport, Monmouthshire. She was on a voyage from Cardigan to Newport. She was refloated and taken in to Newport. |

== 2 March ==
List of shipwrecks: 2 March 1851
| Ship | State | Description |
|---|---|---|
| Aimable Eugenie | France | The sloop was wrecked on the Longsand, in the North Sea off the coast of Essex, United Kingdom. Her crew were rescued. She was on a voyage from Seaham, County Durham, United Kingdom to Bordeaux, Gironde. |
| Annie | United Kingdom | The ship ran aground on the Jordan Bank, in the Irish Sea. She was on a voyage from Ardrossan, Ayrshire to Liverpool, Lancashire. SHe was refloated and taken in to Liverpool in a leaky condition. |
| Atalanta | United Kingdom | The steamboat was holed by the anchor of Admiral Codrington (United Kingdom) and sank at Ipswich, Suffolk. All on board were rescued. She was on a voyage from Harwich, Essex to Ipswich. |
| Curia | United Kingdom | The barque was wrecked in the Laccadive Islands. Her crew were rescued. She was on a voyage from Judda, Ottoman Arabia to Calicut, India. |
| Happy Return | United Kingdom | The ship was run into by a tug and sank at Bridgwater, Somerset. She was on a voyage from Troon, Ayrshire to Bridgwater. |
| Jeanette and Anna | Belgium | The ship was in collision with a steamship and sank in the English Channel off Cap Gris Nez, Pas-de-Calais, France and sank with the loss of a crew member. She was on a voyage from Livorno, Grand Duchy of Tuscany to Antwerp. |
| Margaret | United Kingdom | The ship ran aground off Yarmouth, Isle of Wight. She was on a voyage from Newport, Monmouthshire to Southampton, Hampshire. She was refloated and resumed her voyage. |

== 3 March ==
List of shipwrecks: 3 March 1851
| Ship | State | Description |
|---|---|---|
| Buckinghamshire | United Kingdom | The troopship, an East Indiaman, was destroyed by fire in the Hooghly River with the loss of several of the 200-plus people on board. She was on a voyage from Calcutta, India to London. |
| Bug (Буг) | Imperial Russian Navy | The transport ship was driven ashore in Tsemes Bay. Her crew were rescued. She was refloated on 6 March. |
| Dasher | United Kingdom | The brig was driven ashore at "Chilton", Isle of Wight. She was on a voyage from Newport, Monmouthshire to Southampton, Hampshire. She was refloated. |
| George | United Kingdom | The full-rigged ship ran aground at Dover, Kent and was severely damaged. She was on a voyage from South Shields, County Durham to Folkestone, Kent. |
| Glide | United Kingdom | The ship ran aground and was damaged at Great Yarmouth, Norfolk. She was on a voyage from South Shields to Galaţi, Ottoman Empire. |
| Lastochka (Ласточка, 'Swallow') | Imperial Russian Navy | The schooner was driven ashore in Tsemes Bay. Her crew were rescued. She was refloated on 6 March. Subsequently repaired and returned to service. |
| William Wilson | United Kingdom | The ship foundered 89 nautical miles (165 km) east of Cape Frio, Brazil. Her crew were rescued. She was on a voyage from South Shields to Aden. |

== 4 March ==
List of shipwrecks: 4 March 1851
| Ship | State | Description |
|---|---|---|
| Ardasser | United Kingdom | The ship was burnt off Penang, Malaya. The fire was blamed on the spontaneous ignition of kittisols. |
| Brothers | United Kingdom | The ship departed from Sunderland, County Durham for Rye, Sussex. Subsequently foundered with the loss of all hands; wreckage from the ship was discovered 130 nautical miles (240 km) off Spurn Point, Yorkshire on 11 April. |
| Célina | France | The schooner was in collision with the brig Persévérant (France) and sank. Her crew were rescued. She was on a voyage from Llanelly, Glamorgan, United Kingdom to Bordeaux, Gironde. |
| Eudora | United States | The ship was in collision with the barque Annabella (United Kingdom) and sank in the Atlantic Ocean between Cape Florida, Florida and Gum Key. Her crew were rescued by Annabella. |
| General Taylor | United States | The brig was wrecked on the Spanish Key. Her crew were rescued. |
| Pharos | United Kingdom | The ship struck rocks at Warrenpoint, County Antrim and was damaged. |
| Saxon Maid | United Kingdom | The ship was wrecked at Whitby, Yorkshire. Her crew were rescued. She was on a voyage from Sunderland, County Durham to Bordeaux, Gironde, France. |
| Sovereign | United Kingdom | The ship departed from Halifax, Nova Scotia, British North America for Liverpool, Lancashire. No further trace, presumed foundered with the loss of all hands. |

== 5 March ==
List of shipwrecks: 5 March 1851
| Ship | State | Description |
|---|---|---|
| Alliance | United Kingdom | The ship foundered in the Irish Sea off Dungarvan, County Waterford. Her crew were rescued. She was on a voyage from Cardiff, Glamorgan to Ballinacurra, County Cork. |
| Eclipse | United Kingdom | The schooner was wrecked on the Partin Heel, in the North Sea off Lindisfarne, Northumberland with the loss of all hands. |
| Frederikke | Denmark | The ship was driven ashore at the entrance to the Agger Canal. She was on a voyage from Newcastle upon Tyne, Northumberland to Nykøbing. She was refloated but consequently sank with the loss of a crew member. |
| Jeanne d'Arc | France | The schooner ran aground on the Corton Sands, in the North Sea off the coast of Suffolk, United Kingdom. All but her captain abandoned her. She was beached at Walberswick, Suffolk. Jeanne d'Arc was on a voyage from Blyth, Northumberland, United Kingdom to Boulogne, Pas-de-Calais. |
| Pharos | United Kingdom | The smack ran aground on the Hely Hunter Rocks, in the Irish Sea off the coast of County Down. She was refloated and taken in to Warrenpoint in a severely leaky condition. |
| Rambler | United Kingdom | The brig ran aground and sank at Cabrita Point, Spain. Her crew were rescued. She was on a voyage from London to Gibraltar. |
| Stadt Leer | Kingdom of Hanover | The ship was lost off Borkum. She was on a voyage from Newcastle upon Tyne, Northumberland to Varel. |

== 6 March ==
List of shipwrecks: 6 March 1851
| Ship | State | Description |
|---|---|---|
| Elizabeth Ann | United Kingdom | The schooner was driven ashore at Portugalete, Spain. Her crew were rescued. She was on a voyage from Newport, Monmouthshire to Bilbao, Spain. |
| Ferdinand | France | The ship was wrecked on the Jument Rock, off Ouessant, Finistère. Her crew were rescued. She was on a voyage from Bordeaux, Gironde to Lübeck and Rostock. |
| Flamingo | United Kingdom | The ship was driven ashore and damaged on "Beenay Island", Shetland Islands. |
| Mary White | United Kingdom | The brig was wrecked on the Goodwin Sands, Kent with the loss of three of her ten crew. Survivors were rescued by the lugger Buffalo Gal (United Kingdom) and the Broadstairs Lifeboat. Mary White was on her maiden voyage, from Sunderland, County Durham to Smyrna, Ottoman Empire. |
| Northumberland | United Kingdom | The ship was wrecked on the Mellum Sand, in the North Sea with the loss of eight of her ten crew. She was on a voyage from Newcastle upon Tyne, Northumberland to Hamburg. |

== 7 March ==
List of shipwrecks: 7 March 1851
| Ship | State | Description |
|---|---|---|
| Agnes | United Kingdom | The sloop was driven ashore and wrecked in Inch Bay, County Kerry. Her crew survived. She was on a voyage from Valentia Island to Tralee. |
| Anna Elise | United Kingdom | The ship ran aground off Cardiff, Glamorgan. She was refloated and proceeded to Bristol, Gloucestershire for repairs. |
| Bramwell | United Kingdom | The flat collided with the schooner Hebe (United Kingdom), capsized and sank in the River Mersey. |
| Hoffnung | Denmark | The ketch was wrecked between Adra and Roquesas, Spain. Her crew were rescued. She was on a voyage from London, United Kingdom to Valencia, Spain. Hoffnung was refloated on 12 March and sailed for Cartagena, Spain. |
| Myra | United Kingdom | The ship ran aground on the Herd Sand, in the North Sea off the coast of County Durham. |

== 8 March ==
List of shipwrecks: 8 March 1851
| Ship | State | Description |
|---|---|---|
| Aimable Societé | United Kingdom | The ship sank on the Haut Dye. Her crew were rescued. She was on a voyage from Coursan, Aude to London, United Kingdom. |
| Castlehill | United Kingdom | The schooner was in collision with European (United Kingdom) and sank in the Clyde with the loss of one of her four crew. Survivors were rescued by European. |
| Ceres | United Kingdom | The ship struck rocks off Redcar, Yorkshire and was damaged. She was on a voyage from Whitby, Yorkshire to Hartlepool, County Durham. She was refloated and resumed her voyage. |
| Elise | France | An onboard explosion sank the ship at Buenos Aires, Argentina with the loss of ten lives. Twenty people were wounded. She was on a voyage from Havre de Grâce, Seine-Inférieure to Tenerife, Canary Islands and California, United States. |
| Laing | United Kingdom | The ship was driven ashore in the Dardanelles. She was later refloated. |
| Primrose | United Kingdom | The ship was driven ashore at Barrington, Nova Scotia, British North America. She was on a voyage from Philadelphia, Pennsylvania, United States to Halifax, Nova Scotia. |
| Sarah | United Kingdom | The brig was driven ashore and damaged near Cape Charles, Virginia, United States. She was on a voyage from Fredericksburg, Virginia to Halifax, Nova Scotia. She was refloated on 2 April and taken in to Norfolk, Virginia. |
| Xarifa | Ottoman Empire | The ship ran aground on the Kish Bank, in the Irish Sea and was damaged. She was on a voyage from Constantinople to Kingstown, County Dublin, United Kingdom. She was refloated and put in to Kingstown in a sinking condition. |

== 9 March ==
List of shipwrecks: 9 March 1851
| Ship | State | Description |
|---|---|---|
| Defender | United Kingdom | The ship ran aground at South Shields, County Durham. She was on a voyage from Gibraltar to South Shields. She was refloated and taken in to South Shields. |
| Demuth | Duchy of Holstein | The ship struck a sunken wreck and foundered off Dithmarschen. Duchy of Schleswig. Her crew were rescued. She was on a voyage from Newcastle upon Tyne, Northumberland, United Kingdom to Tønning. |
| Loder | Hamburg | The barque was in collision with the koff Margaretha Antoinette (Kingdom of Hanover) and sank in the North Sea off Terschelling, Friesland, Netherlands. Her crew were rescued by Margaretha Antoinette. Loder was on a voyage from North Shields, County Durham, United Kingdom to Cuxhaven. |

== 10 March ==
List of shipwrecks: 10 March 1851
| Ship | State | Description |
|---|---|---|
| Alliance | United Kingdom | The ship foundered off Dungarvan, County Waterford. Her crew were rescued. She was on a voyage from Cardiff, Glamorgan to Ballinacurra, County Cork. |
| Frau Christine | Duchy of Holstein | The ship ran aground on the Heverknob and was abandoned. She was on a voyage from Wyk auf Föhr to a Norwegian port. She subsequently floated off and grounded on the Knipsand. |

== 11 March ==
List of shipwrecks: 11 March 1851
| Ship | State | Description |
|---|---|---|
| Theresia | France | The galiot was discovered abandoned in the English Channel, having been in collision with another vessel. She was taken in to Dieppe, Seine-Inférieure. She was on a voyage from Havre de Grâce, Seine-Inférieure to "Goree", Africa. |
| Veloz | Spain | The barque was driven ashore 10 nautical miles (19 km) south of Wexford, United Kingdom. She was on a voyage from Bilbao to Liverpool, Lancashire, United Kingdom. |
| Wakefield | United Kingdom | The barque was beached at South Shields, County Durham. |

== 12 March ==
List of shipwrecks: 12 March 1851
| Ship | State | Description |
|---|---|---|
| Volusia | United Kingdom | The ship was driven ashore at Great Yarmouth, Norfolk. She was on a voyage from Great Yarmouth to Newcastle upon Tyne, Northumberland. She was refloated the next day and put back to Great Yarmouth. |
| Wakefield | United Kingdom | The ship ran aground and was damaged at South Shields, County Durham. She was refloated and put back to South Shields. |

== 13 March ==
List of shipwrecks: 13 March 1851
| Ship | State | Description |
|---|---|---|
| David D'Angers | France | The ship was wrecked on the Loup Garou, Martinique. Her crew were rescued. She was on a voyage from Newcastle upon Tyne, Northumberland, United Kingdom to Fort-de-France, Martinique. |
| Exile | United Kingdom | The ship was driven ashore and damaged. She was refloated and taken in to Stornoway, Isle of Lewis, Outer Hebrides. |
| Port-a-Port | Sweden | The schooner ran aground in Hornbeck Bay. She was on a voyage from Messina, Sicily to Stockholm. She was refloated the next day and towed in to Helsingør, Denmark. |

== 14 March ==
List of shipwrecks: 14 March 1851
| Ship | State | Description |
|---|---|---|
| Belle | United Kingdom | The barque was wrecked on the Bird Rock. Her crew were rescued. She was on a voyage from Bermuda to Cuba. |
| Border Queen | United Kingdom | The steamship ran aground on the Wingo Beacon and was wrecked. She was on a voyage from Aarhus, Denmark to Leith, Lothian. |
| Cherub | (United Kingdom of Great Britain and Ireland) Isle of Man | The lugger caught fire off the Calf of Man and was abandoned. She was on a voyage from Port St. Mary to Newcastle upon Tyne, Northumberland. |
| Emanuel | Denmark | The ship was driven ashore on "Thistholm". She was on a voyage from Bremen to Copenhagen. She was refloated and put in to Frederikshavn, where she arrived on 17 March. |
| Janet | United Kingdom | The ship ran aground on the Goodwin Sands, Kent. She was on a voyage from Peterhead, Aberdeenshire to Cuba. She was refloated with the assistance of the lugger Tartar (United Kingdom) and resumed her voyage. |
| Maria Theresa | United Kingdom | The ship sank in the North Sea off Spurn Point, Yorkshire, United Kingdom. Her crew were rescued. She was on a voyage from Seaham, County Durham, United Kingdom to Bordeaux, Gironde. |

== 15 March ==
List of shipwrecks: 15 March 1851
| Ship | State | Description |
|---|---|---|
| Fidelity | United Kingdom | The brig was severely damaged by fire at Dublin. |
| Jonas Huthon | Norway | The brig ran aground on the Insand, in the North Sea off the coast of County Durham, United Kingdom. She was on a voyage from Dram to South Shields, County Durham. |

== 17 March ==
List of shipwrecks: 17 March 1851
| Ship | State | Description |
|---|---|---|
| Despatch | United Kingdom | The ship was driven ashore and wrecked at Barnstaple, Devon. Her crew were rescued. She was on a voyage from Newport, Monmouthshire to Bude, Cornwall. |
| Mary | United Kingdom | The ship sank in Morecambe Bay. Her crew were rescued. She was on a voyage from Ulverston to Poulton-le-Fylde, Lancashire. |
| Palestine | United Kingdom | The barque was driven ashore at Cape Henry, Virginia, United States and was abandoned by her crew. She was on a voyage from Newport, Monmouthshire to City Point, Virginia. She subsequently broke up. |
| Robina | United Kingdom | The ship was driven ashore at Cape Henry with the loss of five lives. She was on a voyage from Liverpool, Lancashire to Baltimore, Maryland. She was consequently condemned, but was refloated on 7 April and taken in to Baltimore. |

== 18 March ==
List of shipwrecks: 18 April 1851
| Ship | State | Description |
|---|---|---|
| Benjamin | United Kingdom | The ship departed from Rotterdam, South Holland, Netherlands. No further trace, presumed foundered with the loss of all hands. |
| Brandywine | United Kingdom | The ship was driven ashore in the Mississippi River. She was on a voyage from New Orleans, Louisiana, United States to Liverpool, Lancashire. |
| Canezou | Denmark | The ship ran aground off "Svinholmen". She was on a voyage from Holbæk to Gothenburg, Sweden. She was refloated but was consequently beached on Saltholm. |
| Elliot | United Kingdom | The ship struck a sunken rock and sank in Broad Bay. She was on a voyage from South Shields, County Durham to Dublin. |
| King William | United Kingdom | The schooner struck a sunken rock and foundered in the North Sea off Aldeburgh, Suffolk. Her crew were rescued. She was on a voyage from Harwich, Essex to Boston, Lincolnshire. |
| Sally | United Kingdom | The ship ran aground on Caldy Island, Pembrokeshire. She was on a voyage from Cardiff, Glamorgan to Youghal, County Cork. She was refloated and taken in to Tenby, Pembrokeshire in a severely leaky condition. |

== 19 March ==
List of shipwrecks: 19 March 1851
| Ship | State | Description |
|---|---|---|
| Aid | United Kingdom | The ship was driven ashore and wrecked at Port Isaac, Cornwall. |
| Eclair | United Kingdom | The ship sank in Derbyhaven Bay, Isle of Man. She was on a voyage from Genoa, Kingdom of Sardinia to Glasgow, Renfrewshire. |
| John and Hannah | United Kingdom | The ship was driven ashore and wrecked near Waterford. Her crew were rescued. She was on a voyage from South Shields, County Durham to Cork. |
| Mary Ann | United Kingdom | The smack was driven ashore and wrecked at Port Charlotte, Islay, Inner Hebrides. |
| Melpomene | Greece | The brig was driven ashore and wrecked at Dungeness, Kent, United Kingdom. with the loss of ten of the fourteen people on board. She was on a voyage from Cork to London. |
| Naiad | United Kingdom | The Yorkshire billyboy was in collision with Vesper (United Kingdom) and sank in the North Sea 2 nautical miles (3.7 km) off Aldeburgh Suffolk. Her crew were rescued by a brig. She was on a voyage from Hartlepool, County Durham to Gravesend, Kent. |

== 21 March ==
List of shipwrecks: 21 March 1851
| Ship | State | Description |
|---|---|---|
| Eldorado | (United Kingdom of Great Britain and Ireland) British North America | The ship was driven ashore at Indian Point, New Brunswick. She was consequently condemned. |
| Maria | Norway | The ship was driven ashore and wrecked at St. Andrews, Fife, United Kingdom. Her crew were rescued by a lifeboat. She was on a voyage from Dram to Leith, Lothian, United Kingdom. |
| Ringdove | United Kingdom | The ship sprang a leak and foundered 70 nautical miles (130 km) off Savanilla, Republic of New Granada. Her crew were rescued. She was on a voyage from Savanilla to London. |

== 22 March ==
List of shipwrecks: 22 March 1851
| Ship | State | Description |
|---|---|---|
| Belle | United Kingdom | The barque was wrecked on the Bird Rock, off San Juan de los Remedios, Cuba. Her crew were rescued. She was on a voyage from Bermuda to Cuba. |
| Chevy Chase | United Kingdom | The steamship ran aground in the Elbe. She was refloated the next day. |
| Don Juan | United Kingdom | The schooner caught fire and was beached at Holyhead, Anglesey, where she was burnt out. She was on a voyage from Liverpool, Lancashire to Newfoundland, British North America. |
| Emma | Kingdom of Hanover | The ship was wrecked off Wangeroog. Her crew were rescued. |
| Hortensia, Paquete do Para, and Tarujo | Portugal | The brigs Paquete do Para and Tarujo were driven into the barque Hortensia at Lisbon. All three vessels were severely damaged. |
| Maria | Norway | The brig was wrecked on the Tents Mull Sand, in the North Sea off the coast of Forfarshire, United Kingdom. Her crew were rescued. She was on a voyage from Dram to Leith, Lothian, United Kingdom. |

== 24 March ==
List of shipwrecks: 24 March 1851
| Ship | State | Description |
|---|---|---|
| Carolina and Aurora | Flag unknown | The brigantine was wrecked on the English Bank, in the River Plate. |
| Hindoo | United Kingdom | The barque was in collision with John Q. Adams (United States) and sank in the Atlantic Ocean. Her crew were rescued by John Q. Adams. Hindoo was on a voyage from Newcastle upon Tyne, Northumberland to Aden. |
| Jemima | United Kingdom | The ship ran aground on the Navestone Rock, off the coast of Northumberland. She was refloated and resumed her voyage. |
| Oak | United Kingdom | The schooner foundered in the North Sea in 58°00′N 4°00′E. Her crew were rescued. She was on a voyage from "Charleston" or "Charlestown" to Ystad, Sweden. |
| Queen of the Isles | United Kingdom | The ship ran aground at Wexford. She was on a voyage from Ancona, Papal States to Wexford. She was refloated and taken in to Wexford. |
| Rubona | United Kingdom | The ship was driven ashore on Rügen, Prussia. She was on a voyage from Sunderland, County Durham to Stettin. She was refloated but consequently sank 15 nautical miles (28 km) off Rügen. Her crew were rescued. |

== 25 March ==
List of shipwrecks: 25 March 1851
| Ship | State | Description |
|---|---|---|
| Anthony Wayne | United States | The steamboat sank in the Missouri River at Liberty Landing below Kansas City, Kansas. |
| Hillegonda Catharina Helena | Belgium | The ship ran aground at D'Amanau, in the Marquesas Islands and was damaged. She was refloated and taken in to Otaheite for repairs. |
| Jonas Huthon | Norway | The ship ran aground on the Insand, in the North Sea off the coast of County Durham, United Kingdom. She was on a voyage from Dram to South Shields, County Durham. |

== 26 March ==
List of shipwrecks: 26 March 1851
| Ship | State | Description |
|---|---|---|
| Favourite | (United Kingdom of Great Britain and Ireland) British North America | The ship was driven ashore at Trabolgan, County Cork. Her crew and all 225 passengers were rescued. She was on a voyage from Liverpool, Lancashire to New York, United States. She was refloated the next day with assistance from HMS Wizard (Royal Navy) and assisted in to Queenstown, County Cork. |
| Olympe | France | The schooner was driven ashore at "Haardwycke", Belgium. |
| Osiris | Rostock | The ship was driven ashore between Beddingestrand and "Smyze", Sweden. She was on a voyage from Rostock to Gotland, Sweden. |
| Sussex Lass | United Kingdom | The ship was wrecked on a reef north east of Boa Vista, Cape Verde Islands. Her crew survived. She was on a voyage from Cádiz, Spain to the Rio Grande. |
| Telltale | United Kingdom | The ship ran aground at Figueira da Foz, Portugal. She was on a voyage from Figueira da Foz to London. She was refloated. |

== 27 March ==
List of shipwrecks: 27 March 1851
| Ship | State | Description |
|---|---|---|
| Cumberland | United Kingdom | The ship was driven ashore near Berbice, British Guiana. |
| George | (United Kingdom of Great Britain and Ireland) British North America | The ship was driven ashore at Tarifa, Spain. Her crew were rescued. She was on a voyage from Alexandria, Egypt to Cork. |
| George Gordon | United Kingdom | The barque ran aground on the Scroby Sands, Norfolk. She was on a voyage from London to Hartlepool, County Durham. She was refloated and resumed her voyage. |
| Jeannie Deans | (United Kingdom of Great Britain and Ireland) New South Wales | The schooner was driven ashore and wrecked at Broulee. Her crew were rescued. |
| Louise | United Kingdom | The ship sank near Stralsund. Her crew were rescued. |

== 28 March ==
List of shipwrecks: 28 March 1851
| Ship | State | Description |
|---|---|---|
| Ann | United Kingdom | The sloop was driven ashore and sank at Spurn Point, Yorkshire. She was refloated. |
| Edmund | Bremen | The ship ran aground at Bremerhaven. She was refloated the next day and taken in to Bremerhaven. |
| Enigheden | Hamburg | The ship was wrecked on the Tegeler Sand, in the North Sea. she was on a voyage from Messina, Sicily to Hamburg. |
| Hero of Sidon | United Kingdom | The ship ran aground near Apalachicola, Florida and was damaged. She was on a voyage from Liverpool, Lancashire to Apalachicola. She was consequently condemned. |

== 29 March ==
List of shipwrecks: 29 March 1851
| Ship | State | Description |
|---|---|---|
| Ann Clark | United Kingdom | The brig ran aground on the Shoebury Knock Sand, in the Thames Estuary. She was on a voyage from Porto, Portugal to London. She was refloated the next day and resumed her voyage. |
| Cato | United Kingdom | The ship was wrecked on the Moselle Shoal, in the Bahamas. She was on a voyage from Liverpool, Lancashire to New Orleans, Louisiana. |
| Eolus | United Kingdom | The ship was in collision with Elizabeth (United Kingdom) and was beached at Cardiff, Glamorgan. She was on a voyage from Waterford to Cardiff. |
| Swallow | United Kingdom | The ship struck a rock and sank in the River Tees. She was on a voyage from Great Yarmouth, Norfolk to Hartlepool, County Durham. She was refloated and assisted in to Stockton-on-Tees, County Durham. |

== 30 March ==
List of shipwrecks: 30 March 1851
| Ship | State | Description |
|---|---|---|
| Anna Maria | United Kingdom | The ship was destroyed by fire off Flamborough Head, Yorkshire. Her crew were rescued. She was on a voyage from Grimsby, Lincolnshire to South Shields, County Durham. |
| Celerity | United Kingdom | The ship ran aground on the Barber Sand, in the North Sea off the coast of Norfolk. She was refloated and resumed her voyage. |
| Comet | (United Kingdom of Great Britain and Ireland) New South Wales | The schooner was wrecked at the mouth of the Tweed River. |
| Hotspur | United Kingdom | The brig was wrecked on the Molasses Reef, off Inagua, Bahamas. Her crew were rescued. She was on a voyage from Saint Domingo to Liverpool, Lancashire. |
| John | United Kingdom | The ship ran aground on the Barber Sand. She was refloated and resumed her voyage. |
| Ninus | (United Kingdom of Great Britain and Ireland) Jersey | The ship was driven ashore in Saint Brelade's Bay. She was on a voyage from Porto, Portugal to Jersey. She was refloated with the assistance of the tug Don ( (United Kingdom of Great Britain and Ireland) Jersey) and taken in to Jersey. |

== 31 March ==
List of shipwrecks: 31 March 1851
| Ship | State | Description |
|---|---|---|
| Courrier Rose | France | The schooner was wrecked at Salé, Morocco. |
| Ebenezer | United Kingdom | The schooner was wrecked on the Horse Bank, in the Irish Sea off the coast of Lancashire. She was on a voyage from Dundalk, County Louth to Preston, Lancashire. |
| Jean and Mary | United Kingdom | The schooner was run down and sunk by the fishing vessel Saucy Lass (United Kingdom) off Spurn Point, Yorkshire. Her crew were rescued. She was on a voyage from Findhorn, Aberdeenshire to Hull, Yorkshire She was refloated on 22 April and taken in to Grimsby, Lincolnshire in a severely damaged condition. |
| John Whitely | (United Kingdom of Great Britain and Ireland) New Zealand | The schooner struck a reef at the entrance to New Plymouth harbour. All hands were saved. |
| Mersey | United Kingdom | The brig was in collision with the brig Cawton (United Kingdom) and then ran aground on the Goodwin Sands, Kent, where she was wrecked. Her crew were rescued. |
| Minstrel | United Kingdom | The barque was abandoned in the Atlantic Ocean. Her crew were rescued by Nicholas (United States). Minstrel was on a voyage from Hull to Boston, Massachusetts, United States. |
| Nova Sociedade | Portugal | The schooner was wrecked at Salé. |
| Promise | United Kingdom | The ship was in collision with Jacob Roggeveen (Netherlands) and foundered in the English Channel off Folkestone, Kent. Her crew were rescued. She was on a voyage from South Shields, County Durham to Malta. |

== Unknown date ==
List of shipwrecks: Unknown date in March 1851
| Ship | State | Description |
|---|---|---|
| Aghios Nicolaos | Greece | The ship was abandoned at La Spezia, Kingdom of the Two Sicilies before 8 March. |
| Alverton | United Kingdom | The ship caught fire at Shanghai, China between 3 and 15 March and was scuttled. She was later refloated. |
| Ann Bailey | United Kingdom | The ship was lost in Pitt's Passage. All on board were rescued. |
| Ann Dingwall | United Kingdom | The ship was wrecked at "Gocacalco", Mexico. Her crew were rescued. |
| Deux Leonard | France | The ship foundered off Saint-Malo, Ille-et-Vilaine before 22 March. She was on a voyage from Rennes to Saint-Malo. |
| Emblem | (United Kingdom of Great Britain and Ireland) British North America | The ship was abandoned in the Atlantic Ocean before 12 March. |
| Glencoe | United Kingdom | The ship ran aground on a coral reef whilst on a voyage from Auckland, New Zealand to San Francisco, California, United States. She put in to Raiatea, Society Islands before 26 March. |
| Lady Lilford | United Kingdom | The ship foundered in the Pacific Ocean. Her crew were rescued by Louisa Maria (United States). Lady Lilford was on a voyage from California, United States to Valparaíso, Chile. |
| Rambler | United Kingdom | The brig was wrecked at Cabrita Point, Spain. Her crew were rescued. |
| Sceptre | United Kingdom | The brig ran aground on the Whale's Back and was damaged whilst on a voyage from Wilmington, North Carolina, United States to Halifax Nova Scotia, British North America. She arrived at Halifax on 24 March. |
| Sophie Augustine | France | The ship was in collision with a steamship before 29 March and was abandoned off Borkum, Kingdom of Hanover. She was towed in to Glückstadt, Kingdom of Hanover. |
| Sylphide | Flag unknown | The ship capsized before 9 March and was abandoned. |
| Theresa | France | The schooner was abandoned in the English Channel before 12 March. She was on a voyage from Newcastle upon Tyne, Northumberland, United Kingdom to Goeree, Zeeland, Netherlands and Cherbourg, Seine-Inférieure. She was towed in to Torbay. |
