= Yodoe, Tottori =

Dissolved municipality in Tottori prefecture, Japan

Yodoe (淀江町, Yodoe-chō) was a town located in Saihaku District, Tottori Prefecture, Japan.

As of 2003, the town had an estimated population of 8,852 and a density of 343.10 persons per km^{2}. The total area was 25.80 km^{2}.

On March 31, 2005, Yodoe was merged into the expanded city of Yonago.
