= Kittisol =

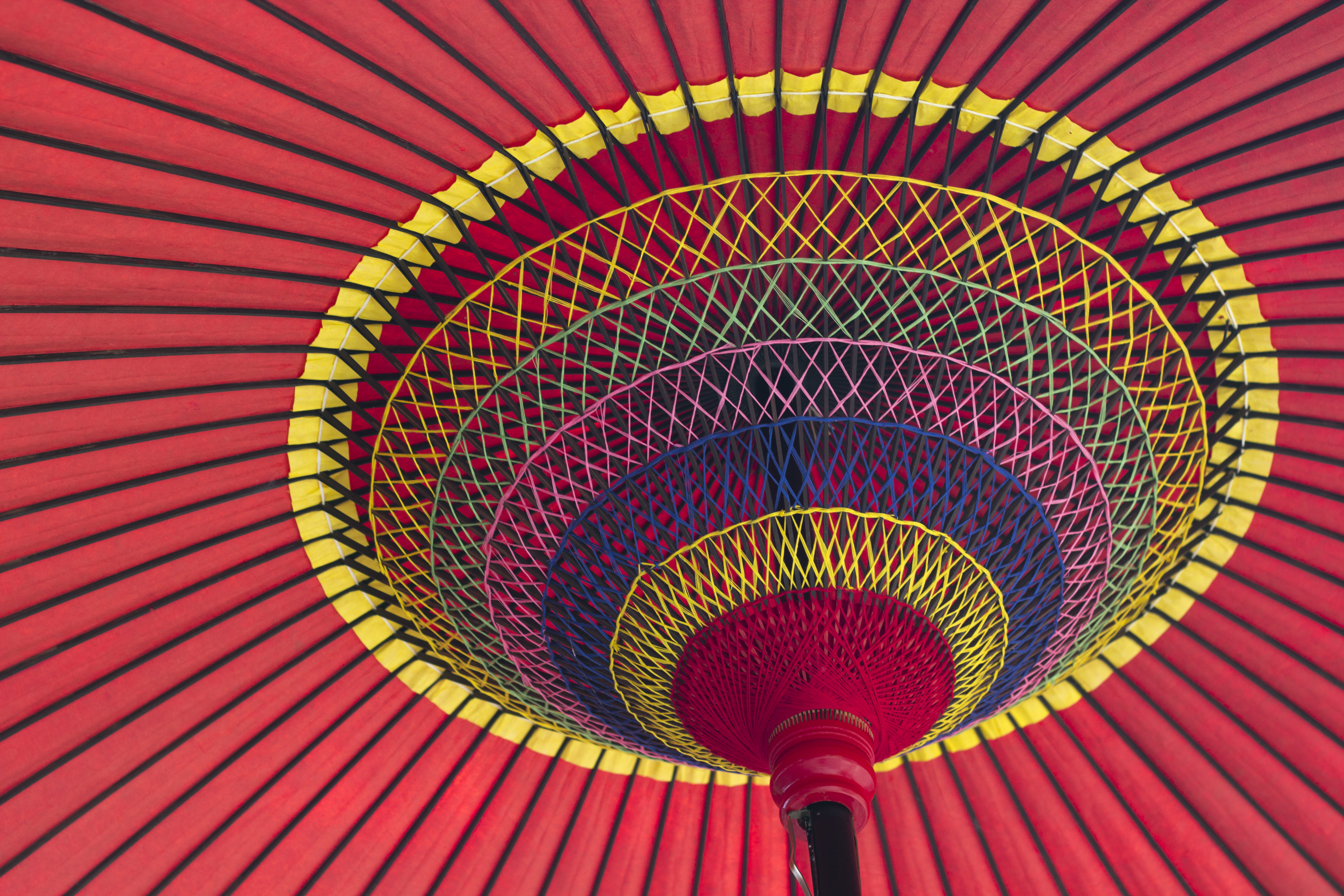
Close-up of a traditional Japanese parasol

Kittisol is an obsolete Indian-English term from the 19th Century for paper umbrellas, and rain-cloaks, made of oiled paper, afterwards varnished. They were made in China or Japan, and the name may have originated in the Portuguese quita-sol, meaning "excluding the sun", for parasol. In India, the term extended to the men who acted as umbrella bearers for important persons.

In a treaty with China in 1844, the United States agreed a tariff of 5 mace per 100 catties on exports of kittisols to the United States.
