= Soelaeman Pringgodigdo =

Indonesian diplomat (1934–1995)

Raden Mas Soelaeman Pringgodigdo

Ambassador of Indonesia to Hungary, Bosnia and Herzegovina, and Croatia
- In office 15 January 1992 – 30 March 1995
- President: Suharto
- Preceded by: Bustanul Arifin
- Succeeded by: Hassan Abduldjalil

Personal details
- Born: November 20, 1934 Batavia, Dutch East Indies
- Died: March 30, 1995 (aged 60) Budapest, Hungary
- Resting place: Cibatu, Bogor
- Spouse: Ainun
- Children: Nuriza Ekadini Pringgodigdo
- Parents: Abdoel Kareem Pringgodigdo (father); Soewarni (mother)
- Education: University of Indonesia (Drs.)

Military service
- Allegiance: Indonesia
- Branch/service: Army
- Years of service: 1964 – 1968

Soelaeman Pringgodigdo, commonly known as Apong (20 November 1934 – 30 March 1995) was an Indonesian career diplomat who was Indonesia's ambassador to Hungary from 1993 until his death in 1995. He was later accredited to Bosnia and Herzegovina and Croatia, becoming the first Indonesian ambassador to both countries. Before his service in Hungary, Soelaeman was the deputy ambassador in Paris and director of Europe in the foreign department.

== Early life and education ==
Soelaeman Pringgodigdo was born in Jakarta on 20 November 1934 as the eldest child of three born to Abdoel Kareem Pringgodigdo and Soewarni. His father, Abdoel Kareem Pringgodigdo, was an Indonesian statesmen who became Indonesia's first cabinet secretary and statistics chief. Among his brothers, Soelaeman was the only one who exhibited interest in arts, and according to his niece he often sang classical songs while bathing. Soelaeman's younger brother, Girindro, went on to became a law scholar and the dean of University of Indonesia's law school. Soelaeman earned his bachelor's degree in economics from the University of Indonesia in 1963.

== Diplomatic career ==
Soelaeman entered the foreign department on the same year he graduated, and completed his basic diplomatic training the year after. He underwent compulsory military service in the army from 1964 to 1968. After undergoing an equivalency course for basic diplomatic training in 1970, in 1971 he received his first posting overseas at the embassy in Den Haag, Netherlands, with the rank of third secretary. He was transferred to the economic section embassy in Washington D.C. in 1972, and along with that was promoted to second secretary.

From Washington D.C., Soelaeman was recalled to the foreign department and completed mid-level diplomatic course in 1977, before returning to overseas posting at the embassy in Tokyo with the diplomatic rank of first secretary in 1978. He was promoted to counsellor shortly later. Soelaeman accompanied Gesang Martohartono, whose song Bengawan Solo was famous in Japan, in his visit to Sapporo in 1980. Soelaeman pledged to raise funds from Gesang's fans in Japan to be donated for the development of kroncong music.

Soelaeman was appointed as the consul for economic affairs at the Indonesian consulate general in Hamburg in 1980. From there, he became the head of the economic and socio-cultural center in the foreign department's R&D agency in 1983, during which he completed a brief course in the National Resilience institute in 1984. He became as the deputy chief of mission at the embassy in Paris in 1985, and in 1989 briefly became the embassy's chargé d'affaires, during which he organized an investment seminar in collaboration with the national investment promotion agency. From Paris, Soelaeman was appointed as the foreign department's Europe director in 1989.

Soelaeman was installed as Indonesia's ambassador to Hungary on 15 January 1992. He presented his letters of credence to president Árpád Göncz on 6 April 1992 and handed over his directorship in the foreign department on 12 September 1992. Yugoslavia broke up on the same year, and two of Yugoslavia's breakaway states, Bosnia and Herzegovina and Croatia, were accredited to the embassy. Soelaeman became Indonesia's inaugural ambassador to both countries following the presentation of credentials to President Franjo Tuđman of Croatia on 11 October 1994 and President Alija Izetbegovic of Bosnia and Herzegovina on 8 February 1995.

Soelaeman died on the morning of 30 March 1995 after suffering his third heart attack. Several days before his death, Soelaeman prepared President Suharto's visit to the war-ridden Sarajevo, capital of Bosnia and Herzegovina, in the middle of that month. His body was transported back to Jakarta and arrived on 1 April, where it was placed at his brother's house, before being brought for a cortege departure starting from the foreign department's headquarters to the funeral procession at the Pringgodigo family funeral complex in Cibatu, Bogor.

== Personal life ==
Soelaeman was married to Ainun and has a daughter named Nuriza Ekadini Pringgodigdo, a former politician from the Democratic Renewal Party.
