= Campursari =

Indonesian music genre

Campursari in Indonesian refers to a crossover of several contemporary Indonesian music genres, mainly Javanese langgam jawa and dangdut. The word campursari was coined from the Javanese language and means "mixture of essences". Campursari music is prevalent within the Javanese cultural sphere, especially in Central Java, the Special Region of Yogyakarta, and East Java, and also in some regions where Javanese immigrants are abundant, such as parts of Greater Jakarta, Lampung or even Suriname. It is related to modifying several musical instruments, such as the gamelan, combined with Western musical instruments, such as the guitar and keyboard. The combination thus ends up with the Western instruments being dominated by the traditional Javanese instruments according to the local taste of langgam jawa and gending.

Some popular Campursari artists are Didi Kempot and older langgam jawa kroncong diva Waljinah.
