= Anastasia Tjendri-Liew =

Founder of Bengawan Solo

Anastasia Tjendri-Liew (Born in 1947, Bangka Island, Indonesia) is the founder and managing director of Bengawan Solo, one of Singapore's wholly-owned bakery chains.

Tjendri-Liew was born in Indonesia and immigrated to Singapore in 1970. Bengawan Solo has expanded from a single store to a chain with over 40 locations under her supervision.

== Early years ==
Tjendri-Liew grew up in Palembang, Indonesia, as the third of eight children born on the Indonesian island of Bangka. Her mother was a stay-at-home mom, while her father managed a grocery store. She excelled at school, generally placed in the top three of her class, but there were limited educational opportunities during her adolescence. Shew took cooking lessons and began teaching cooking as a way to earn money to further her education.

== Awards ==
Anastasia was the first woman to receive the Association of Small and Medium Enterprises' Woman Entrepreneur of the Year Award in 1998. In 2008, she was also awarded the Public Service Medal. In 2013, she was awarded the Public Service Star.

== External links and sources ==
- Bengawan Solo. (n.d.)..
- Huang, L. J. (2009, July 13). Domestic goddess. The Straits Times, p. 39. Retrieved from NewspaperSG.
- Cheong, J. (2000, May 15). From home confectionery to S$30m firm. The Business Times, p. 7. Retrieved from NewspaperSG.
- Bengawan Solo. (n.d.)..
- Fernandez, W. (1998, December 7). Icing on the cake for Bengawan Solo boss. The Straits Times, p. 42. Retrieved from NewspaperSG.
- National Day awards. (2008, August 11). The Straits Times, p. 35. Retrieved from NewspaperSG.
- Huang, L. J. (2009, July 13). Domestic goddess. The Straits Times, p. 39. Retrieved from NewspaperSG.
