= Cha huoy teuk =

Cambodian dessert

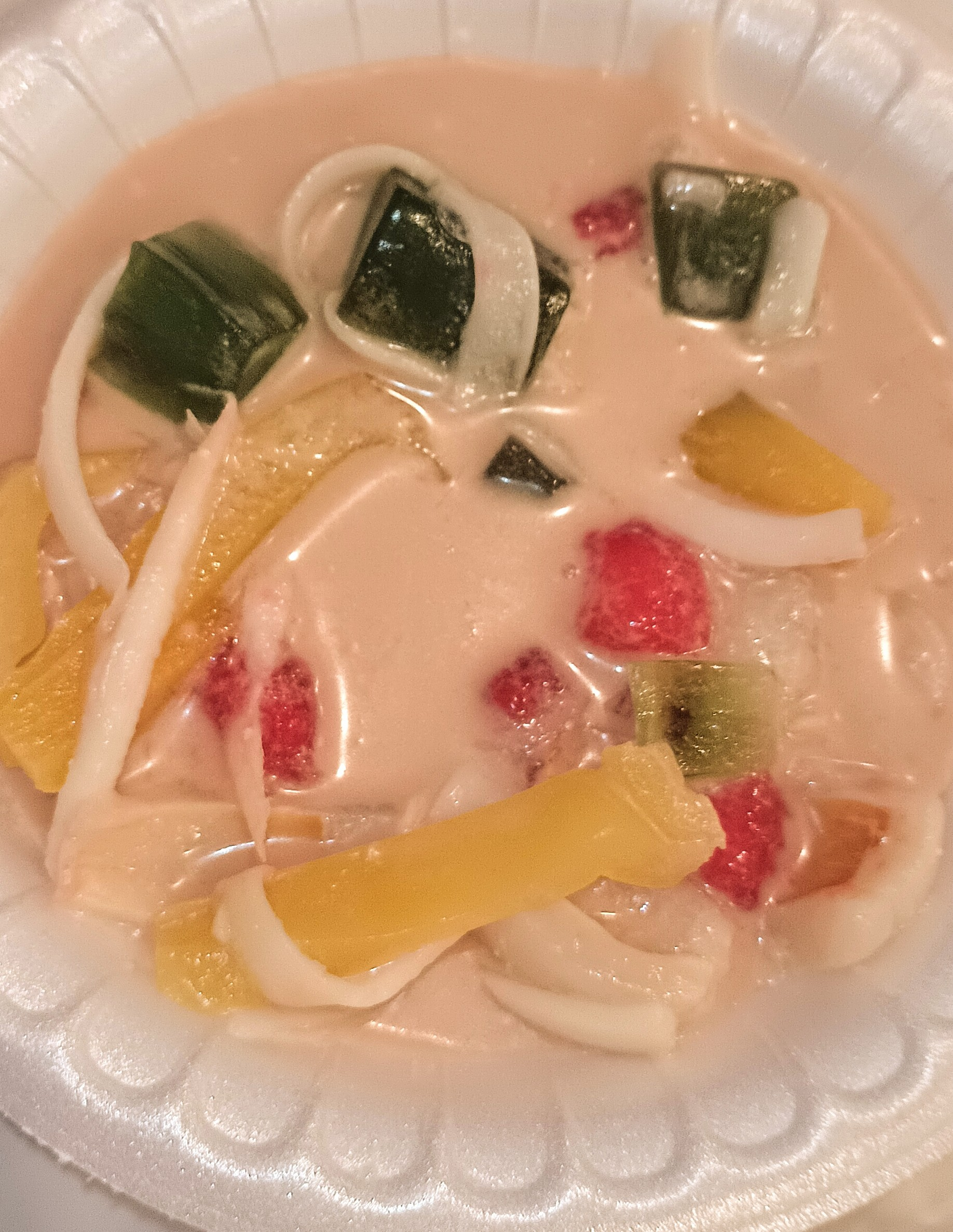
- Cha huoy teuk at Pchum Ben event.
- Alternative names: chahuoy teuk
- Type: dessert
- Place of origin: Cambodia
- Serving temperature: chilled
- Main ingredients: Jell-O or agar, coconut cream/coconut milk, palm sugar, mung beans, taro, tapioca, pumpkin, jackfruit, shaved ice
- Ingredients generally used: pandan, jasmine

Cha huoy teuk (Khmer: ចាហួយទឹក) is a Cambodian jelly dessert made from Jell-O or agar, often infused with pandan or jasmine. It is served chilled with coconut cream/coconut milk, palm sugar syrup, mung beans, taro, sago, colored tapioca drops, pumpkin, jackfruit and shaved ice or crushed ice cubes.

The color of the jelly can range from pink to green to blue. Cha huoy teuk is commonly sold in street stalls and restaurants.
