= Cuk (instrument) =

Traditional Java (Indonesian) musical instrument

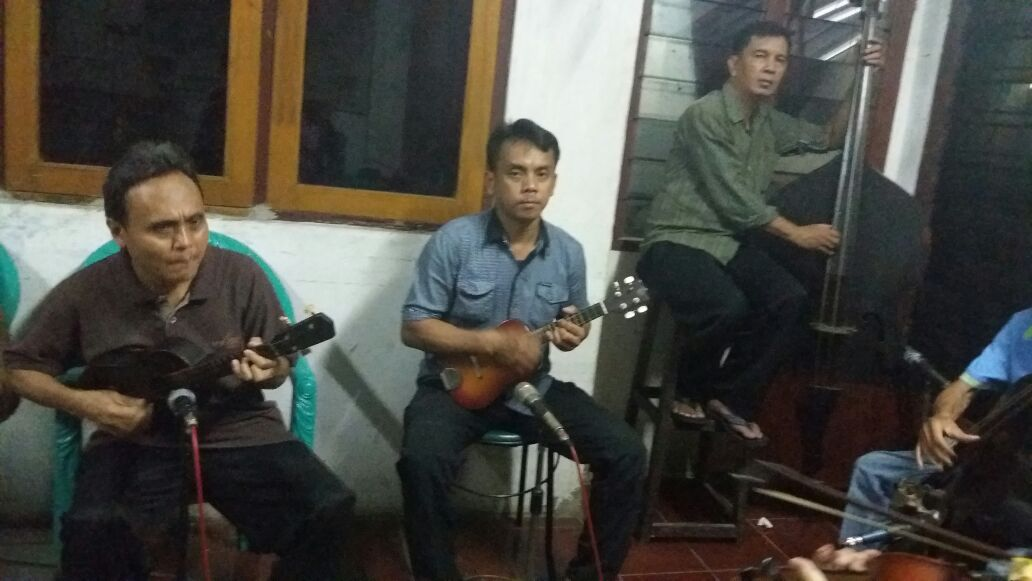
- The instrument being played as part of a keroncong group. The cuk is on the left and the cak is on the right.

String instrument
- Classification: String instrument
- Hornbostel–Sachs classification: (Composite chordophone)
- Developed: Java (Indonesia)

Related instruments
- Cak (instrument), Ukulele, Cavaquinho

The cuk is a stringed musical instrument from Java (Indonesia). It has three strings in three courses. It is tuned G4–B3–E4. The strings are made of thick nylon.

The body is usually hollowed out of a solid piece of wood. It is mainly used to play Keroncong music along with the cak.

== History ==
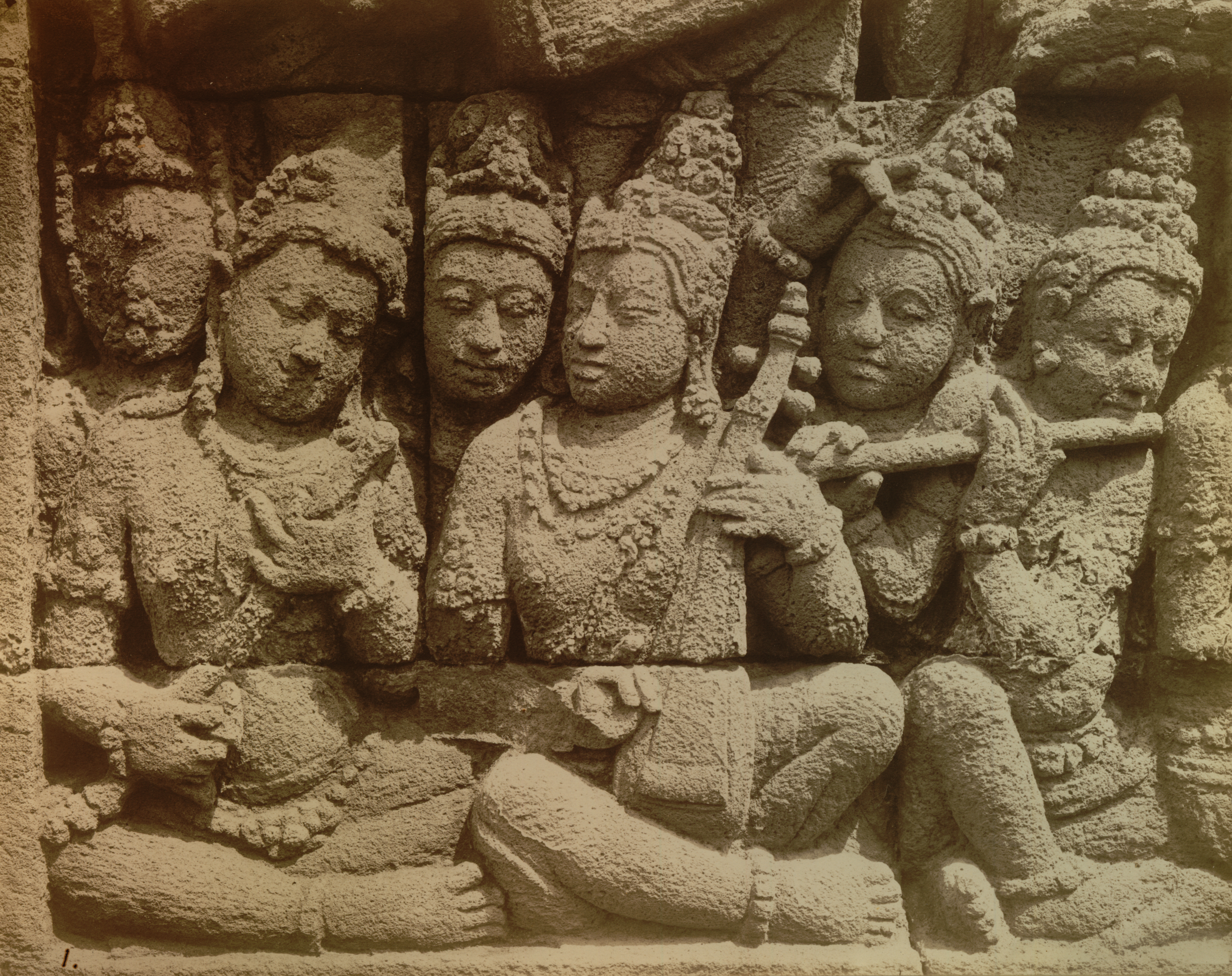
The depiction of Ancient Javaʼs plucked instrument on Borobudur bas-reliefs – 8th century temple in Central Java.

The Cak is thought to be evolved from a cavaquinho. However, the earlier period in Ancient Java shows clear evidences that the native Javanese were already familiar with the small plucked instrument.
