= Rebecca Pan =

Hong Kong actress and singer

- Born: 29 December 1931 (age 94); Shanghai, China
- Awards: Golden Horse Awards – Best Supporting Actress; 1991 Days of Being Wild

Chinese name
- Traditional Chinese: 潘迪華
- Simplified Chinese: 潘迪华
Transcriptions
Standard Mandarin
- Hanyu Pinyin: Pan Dihua

Rebecca Pan Di-hua (simplified Chinese: 潘迪华; traditional Chinese: 潘迪華; also Poon Tik-wah), born Pan Wan-ching (Chinese: 潘宛卿), is a Hong Kong actress and singer.

== Early life ==
She was born in Shanghai on 29 December 1931 and moved to Hong Kong in 1949.

== Career ==
Her singing career began in 1957. One of her songs, which she recorded when she was 18, is played briefly in the 2000 film In the Mood for Love — the English version of an Indonesian folk song, "Bengawan Solo". Pan also played a role in the film as the landlady Mrs. Suen.

== Discography ==
- 《Pan Wan Ching Sings The Four Seasons 潘迪華與世界名曲》, Diamond Records LP1004, 1961.
- 《Oriental Pearls》, Diamond Records LP1006, 1962. Recorded with the Diamond Studio Orchestra conducted by Vic Christobal.
- 《The Exciting Rebecca Pan 我的心．潘迪華》, Diamond Records LP1009, 1963.
- 《我愛你 (I Love You)》, Diamond Records LP1013, 1964.
- 《潘迪華唱 (Rebecca Pan Sings)》, Diamond Records LP1017, 1965.
- 《I Am Yours‧Japanese Good-Day Baby‧Till‧First Night Of The Full Moon》, Life Records EP-2001, 1965.
- 《Tropical Love Song‧Pachanga‧I Could Have Danced All Night‧Chit Chit Rit Chit》, Life Records EP-2002, 1965.
- 《Pan Wan Ching Greatest Hits！ 潘迪華 1965 最新名曲》, Life Records LP-9001/LSP-9001, 1965.
- 《潘迪華 - 花弄影‧我永遠等着你》, EMI Parlophone Records, 1965.
- 《Rebecca Pan Wan-Ching．Rendezvous On Bridge 潘迪華．情人橋》, EMI Pathe Records 7EPA-182, 1965.
- 《Rebecca Pan 潘迪華．When You Were Mine》, EMI Columbia Records ECHK 507, 1966.
- 《Rebecca Pan．Essence Of Love 潘迪華．給我一杯愛的咖啡》, EMI Pathe Records S-CPAX-329, 1967.
- 《Rebecca Pan．A Man And A Woman 潘迪華．男歡女愛》, EMI Angel Records S-3AEX-326, 1968.
- 《Rebecca Pan．Moonlit Villa 潘迪華．月滿西樓》, EMI Angel Records, 1968.
- 《潘迪華．東方時代曲 Vol. 1》, Life Records, 1969.
- 《Rebecca Pan．How Strange 潘迪華．真稀奇》, Life Records LSP-9005, 1969.
- 《Rebecca Pan》, Life Records LELP 1, 1969.
- 《我又想起你》, Life Records LSP-9013, 1970.
- 《Hong Kong Sound With Rebecca Pan》, Sounds Of Asia Records SOA 001, 1970.
- 《Rebecca Live In The Eagle's Nest》, Life Records, 1971.
- 《潘迪華．今夜忘不了》, Yangtze Music YTZEP 301, 1971.
- 《白孃孃 Pai Niang Niang》, EMI Regal Recordings, 1973
- 《White Christmas．Rebecca Pan & The Voices Of Maryknoll》, Man Chi Records MCLP-10201, 1974.

== Filmography as actress ==
- Look for a Star (2009) - Sam's Mother
- Chinese Odyssey 2002 (2002) - Queen Mother
- In the Mood for Love (2000) - Mrs. Suen
- Flowers of Shanghai (1998) - Huang
- Days of Being Wild (1990) (as Tik-Wa Poon) - Rebecca
- Starry Is the Night (1988)
- The Greatest Lover (1988) - Fiona's Mum

== See also ==
- Cinema of Hong Kong
