= Bengawan Solo (song) =

Song by Gesang Martohartono
- Written: 1940
- Genre: Kroncong
- Songwriter: Gesang Martohartono

"Bengawan Solo" (lit. 'the great river of Solo') is an Indonesian Kroncong-style song written by a Javanese, Gesang Martohartono, in 1940. The song is a description of the longest river in the Indonesian island of Java, the Solo River. The song became popular in Indonesia (and Asia as a whole) during the Second World War and was one of the songs promoted nationally in the newly-independent country after the war.

The song is the first song written by an Indonesian in the Indonesian language to achieve widespread popularity in Indonesia. It also became popular in Japan, other Far East and Southeast Asian countries, and many versions of the song in different languages exist.

In October 2025, "Bengawan Solo" was recognized as a National Intangible Cultural Heritage of Indonesia by the Ministry of Culture of the Republic of Indonesia.

== Background ==
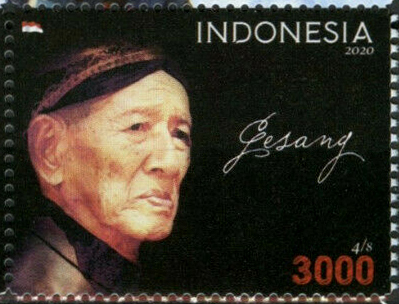
Gesang Martohartono, composer of "Bengawan Solo", honoured in a postage stamp

The song was written in 1940 by Gesang Martohartono when he was 23. Gesang was an untrained musician from Surakarta when he composed "Bengawan Solo". He started the composition by singing the tune, amending it for a few weeks until he was satisfied with it, then wrote the melody down in sol-fa number script. Even though Gesang was Javanese, he decided off the surging nationalist political climate of the day to write the song's lyrics in a form of literary Malay proposed to be the national language "Bahasa Indonesia". It was composed in the local kroncong style, a popular folk style with Portuguese influences. He initially performed the song locally at weddings and social functions, and it then started to gain popularity in Indonesia after two local radio stations began broadcasting the song.

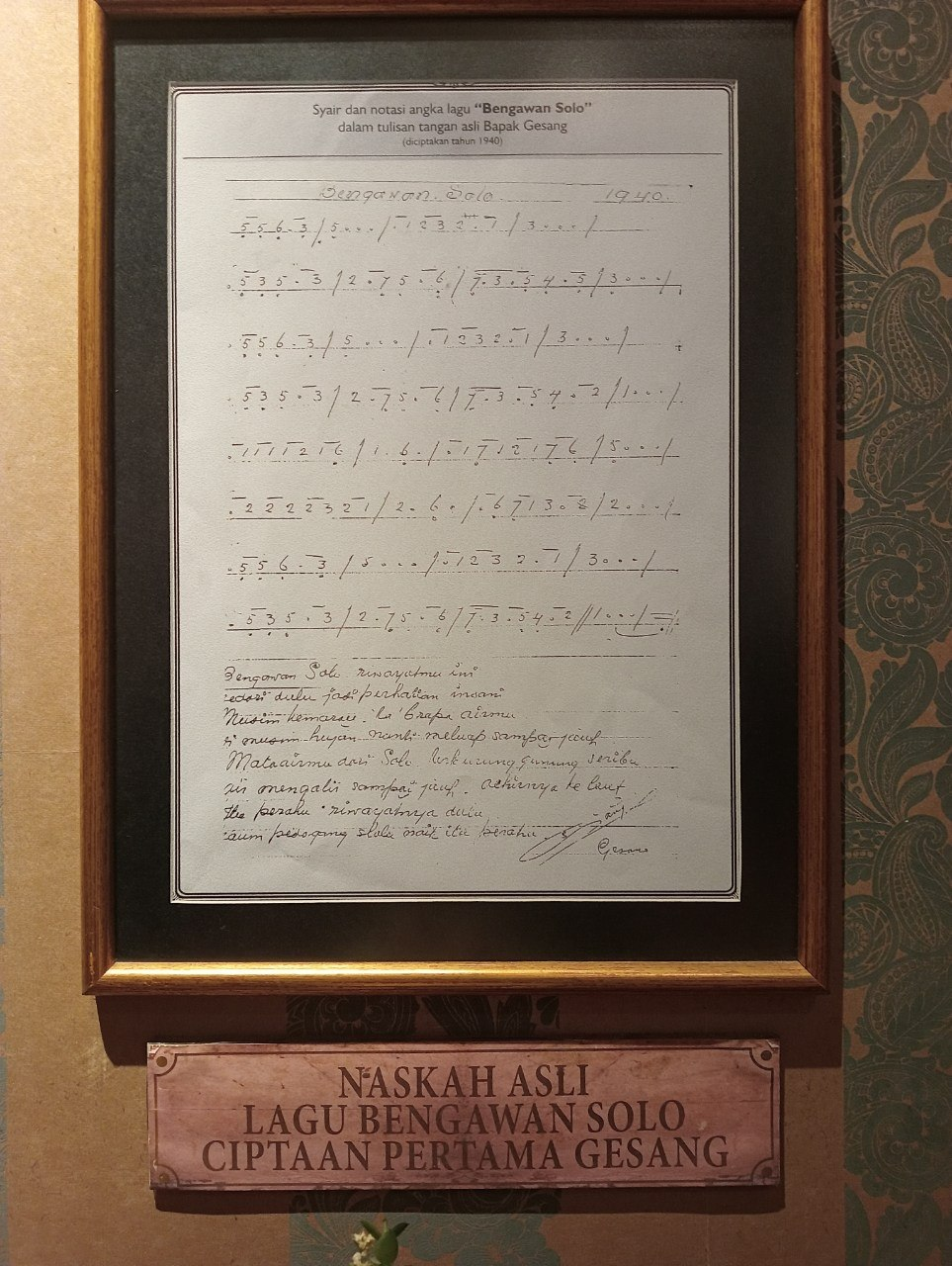
The original music sheet of Bengawan Solo handwritten by Gesang Martohartono in 1940. Taken at the Museum Musik Dunia in Malang.

The song is the first song in Bahasa Indonesia by a local composer to gain wide popularity in Indonesia and around the world. It was widely broadcast as a propaganda song in Indonesia during Japanese occupation of the Dutch East Indies that started in 1942 during World War II, and it was also one of the songs promoted nationally by Sukarno after the Second World War and independence in 1945. It gained wider international attention after the Second World War – the song was popular with the Japanese who occupied Indonesia and the popularity of the song then spread to Japan. The singer Ichirō Fujiyama, who was in Indonesia and taken prisoner in East Java at the end the war, brought the song's melody and lyrics to Japan on his return home. There, Japanese singers recorded the song which proved highly popular. It also spread to other parts of Asia. Its popularity in Japan led many to believe that it was a Japanese song, but in 1990 a court ruled that Gesang wrote the song. A special body was established to manage intellectual property rights in Indonesia after the case and Japan now pays copyright royalty for the song.

In 1991, a group of appreciative Japanese war veterans arranged for a statue of Martohartono to be erected in a park in Surakarta. Gesang, who became a nationally renowned figure for the song, died in 2010.

== Lyrics ==
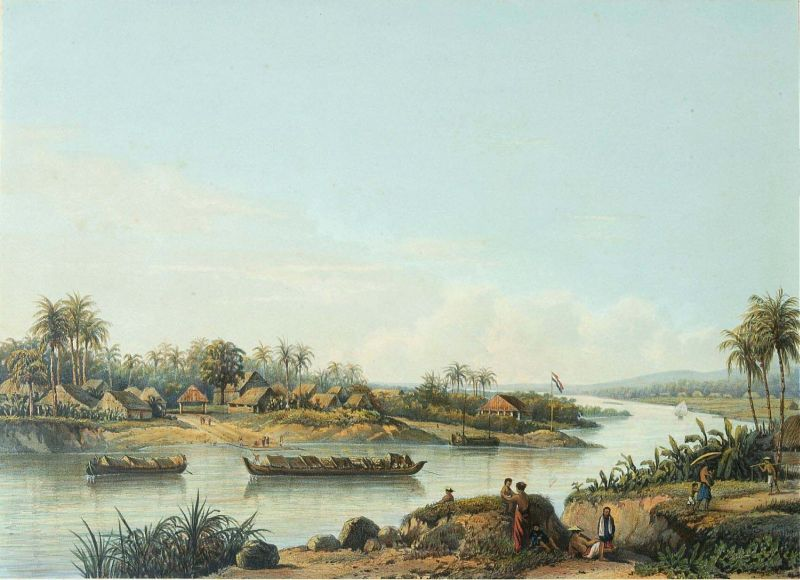
19th century painting of Solo River

The song is a poetic description of Java's longest river, Solo River, which flows through central and eastern Java, Indonesia. It describes how its water changes in the dry and rainy seasons, and that it flows from the city of Surakarta (known locally as Solo) surrounded by mountains, eventually into the sea. It ends with the observation that it has always been used by merchants with boats.

== Cover versions ==
During the Japanese occupation of Indonesia, its melodies appealed to the occupying Japanese soldiers as well as the non-Indonesian prisoners (mainly Dutch civilians) in the internment camps. A Japanese colonel, Takahashi Kōryō, wrote new lyrics in Indonesian to the tune of "Bengsawan Solo" in a song called "Negeri Sekutu" in an attempt to popularize anti-Allies sentiment among Indonesians. Ichirō Fujiyama, a Japanese singer who was taken prisoner in East Java when Japan surrendered and spent some time in a prison in the Solo River area, took "Bengawan Solo" to Japan (with the lyrics translated to Japanese). It gained great popularity when Toshi Matsuda recorded a version in 1947, which became a best-seller. Other singers such as Hibari Misora, Akira Kobayashi and Harumi Miyako also recorded the song.

The tune became a big hit among Chinese communities after Malaysian singer Poon Sow Keng sang it with Mandarin lyrics for Hong Kong Pathe in 1956. Its popularity was further boosted by Koo Mei, who made her rendition for Philips Records shortly thereafter. (Pathe and Philips were major competitors at that time.) Since then, many Chinese language singers have written their own lyrics for the tune. The song has also been recorded in Burmese, Dutch, Khmer, English, Korean, Swedish, Polish, Russian, Tagalog, Thai, and Vietnamese.

An English version, titled "By the River of Love", was recorded by Rebecca Pan in early 1960s in Hong Kong. The lyrics describe a romantic evening beneath twinkling stars and swaying palms. The period recording by Rebecca Pan was used in the soundtrack of the 2000 movie In the Mood for Love by director Wong Kar-wai. Pan also has a role in the movie, playing Mrs. Suen.

Many artists have recorded "Bengawan Solo" in the modern Indonesian and Malaysian languages, including Oslan Husein & Teruna Ria, Waljinah, Anneke Grönloh, Chan Yung Yung (陳蓉蓉), Frances Yip, P. Ramlee and Saloma in their guest appearance for the 1961 Hong Kong film Love Parade (花團錦簇), and Siti Nurhaliza with Noh Salleh. The recording by Oslan Hussein & Teruna Ria was ranked 11th in the list of 150 Best Indonesian Songs of All Time by Rolling Stone Indonesia in 2009.

== Usage and cultural references ==
- Bengawan Solo is the title of the 1949 Indonesian film with the song used as the title theme.
- The song was used in both 1949 Japanese films, Stray Dog and The Quiet Duel, by Akira Kurosawa.
- Bengawan Solo (ブンガワンソロ, Bungawan Soro) is the title of a 1951 Japanese film directed by Kon Ichikawa, with "Bengawan Solo" its theme song.
- "Bengawan Solo" was used in the 1962 film An Autumn Afternoon by Yasujirō Ozu.
- The song performed in English was used in the 2000 film In the Mood for Love directed by Wong Kar-wai.
- Bengawan Solo is the name of a popular chain of cake and pastry shops in Singapore.
- The Mandarin version of this song was used as the ending theme song of the 2019 Chinese film The Wild Goose Lake.

== See also ==
- Music of Indonesia
- Music of Java
