= Harmony Chinese Music Group =

Indonesian Chinese music group

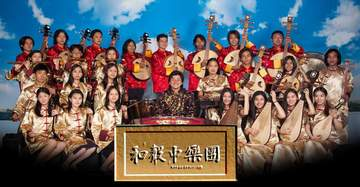
- Orchestra

Background information
- Origin: Bandung
- Genres: World Music
- Years active: 2001 – present
- Members: Andry Harmony, Alvin Raditya, Esther Suryawinata, Jusac Imam Tjahjadi, Roki Setiawan, Ferry Farmudin, Arya Bayunanda, Raissa Graciela, Luigi Casiraghi Yahya, Nindy Lesmana, Denny Hermanto
- Past members: Albert, Ryan, Elizabeth, Catya, Tommy, Melissa, Felicia, Karlina, Yao SuPing Susan, Inge, Melano, Aridwan Lembang, Acuk Sandy, Liang Hui, Tatang, Diana, Maria, Handy, Kang Ren, Tony, Siska, Kareen Gunawan, Astrid, Leno

The Harmony Chinese Music Group (和聲中樂團) is a Chinese music group founded in 2001 in Bandung, Indonesia. The group seeks to promote a wide variety of world music based on Indonesian culture (keroncong, sundanese, batak) using Chinese musical instruments, as well as exploring contemporary styles.

In addition to regular concerts, the group presents workshops and other out-reach activities to a wide range of groups within the Indonesian cultural community. Since its founding, the group has performed throughout Indonesia to promote cultural blend. In Indonesia the group has been featured at the Solo International Keroncong Festival, the Kuta Karnival, Pesta Keroncong Johor 2011 and the Afro-Asian Conference 50th Anniversary.

== Performances ==
Chinese Keroncong @ IKF Solo 2008.

1. Charity Concert @ CiWalk 2005 "Harmony in Humanity" for Aceh tsunami
2. Collaboration Concert with Keroncong Merah Putih 2003
3. Chinese Sundanese Concert with Nano Suratno 2004
4. Afro Asia Art & Culture Festival 2005
5. Indonesian Chinese Music Orchestra Concert 2006
6. Commemorating 50 years Cultural Cooperation Indonesia - China 2007
7. International Keroncong Festival 2008 Solo
8. Simple Gift Concert with Lippo Village Community Choir & Orchestra 2009
9. Indonesian Culture in Harmony Music Concert 2010 with Ega R-Bot Percussion & OPM Solo
10. Pesta Keroncong Johor 2011 in Johor Bahru

-

== Members ==
- Yangqin
  - 林燮明 (Lin Xieming aka Andry Harmony)
- Guzheng
  - Nindy Lesmana
  - Raissa Graciela
- Vocalist
  - Esther Suryawinata

- Sanxian
  - Roki Setiawan
- Daruan
  - Jusac Imam Tjahjadi
- Zhongruan
  - Alvin Raditya
  - Denny Hermanto

- Gu
  - Ferry Farmudin
- Dizi
  - Arya Bayunanda
- Erhu
  - Luigi Casiraghi Yahya

== Discography ==
=== Studio albums (original works) ===
- Suara Hati - Chinese Moslem Album

=== Single ===
- Pokoké Mak Nyus

=== Compilation ===
- Surround in Harmony (In 5.1 surround sound)

Most of these CDs were released in Indonesia

== Video ==
- Youtube video

== See also ==
- Traditional Chinese musical instruments
- Music of China
- Indonesian Music
