= Kroncong =

Genre of Java and Eastern Indonesian folk and traditional popular music

Keroncong/Kroncong ꦏꦼꦫꦺꦴꦤ꧀ꦕꦺꦴꦁ
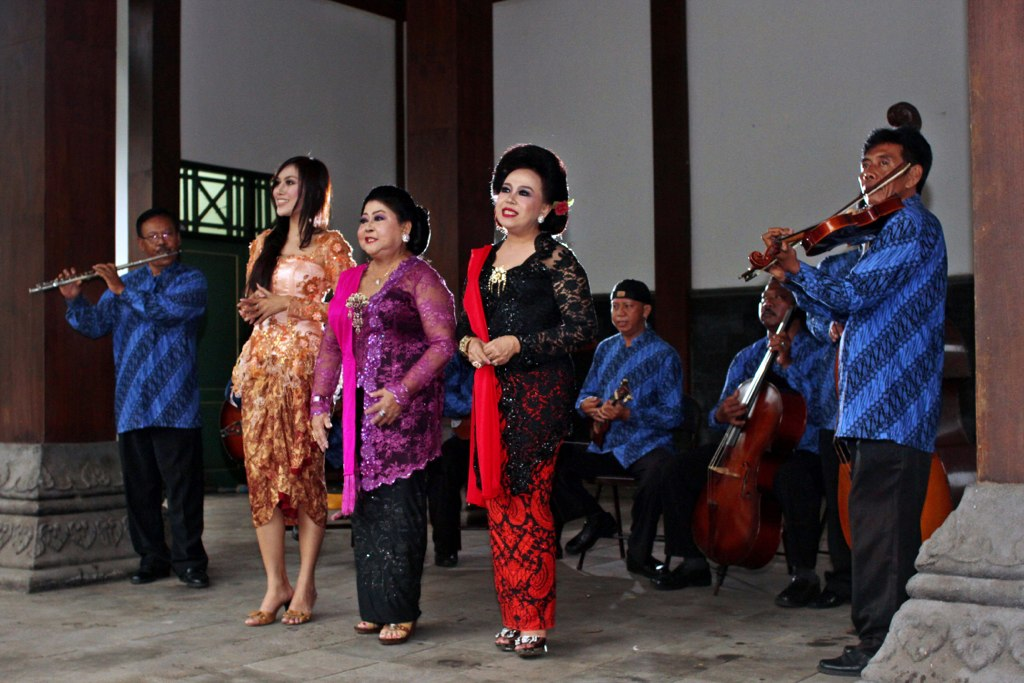
- Waldjinah in a Kroncong performance at the 55th Tong Tong Fair in The Hague (Netherlands)
- Stylistic origins: Colonial (Portuguese and Dutch) and Native (Gambang Kromong, Tanjidor, Langgam Jawa, and Campursari)
- Cultural origins: 16th century Javanese and Eastern Indonesia
- Typical instruments: Vocals – Ukulele – Cello – Guitar – Bass – Flute – Violin
- Derivative forms: Indorock

Subgenres
- Kroncong Koes Plus – Kroncong Beat

Fusion genres
- Pop Kroncong – Kroncong Dangdut

Regional scenes
- Kroncong Tugu, Kroncong in Malaysia

Other topics
- Music of Indonesia

Keroncong or Kroncong (from Javanese ꦏꦼꦫꦺꦴꦤ꧀ꦕꦺꦴꦁ, keroncong 'rumble', Javanese pronunciation: [kəˈrɔnt͡ʃɔŋ]; Javindo: krontjong) refers to both a specific Cak–Cuk, a ukulele-like Javanese instrument, and a unique classical colonial Java and Eastern Indonesian (particularly Maluku and eastern East Nusa Tenggara) musical genre that evolved and first developed in Java Island, especially at the Java port cities of Sunda Kelapa in Greater Jakarta, Semarang and Surakarta in Central Java, as well as Surabaya in East Java, dates back to at least 16th century. It is characterized by its lilting rhythm, distinctive sound from interlocking Cak–Cuk. A Kroncong orchestra (especially in Java), traditionally consists of a blend of local and European instruments like violins, European flutes, cellos and bass (usually in Pizzicato-style), pair of Kroncong (Cak–Cuk) and a vocalist (usually, but not limited to a female vocalist, traditionally taken from Pasindhèn – a Javanese vocalist in Javanese orchestra).

Although the term Kroncong is a native Javanese term in origin, the Kroncong as a musical genre and instrument is an adaptation of a European (particularly the Portuguese and Dutch) musical tradition, brought by the European colonizers to the Java and Eastern Indonesian port cities in the 16th century.

Bengawan Solo (lit. 'the great river of Solo') is one of the well-known Kroncong songs written by Gesang Martohartono, an influential Kroncong musician from Central Java. Besides Gesang Martohartono, a Javanese female singer Waldjinah and a Batavian male musician Ismail Marzuki were amongst the top influential Native Indonesian figures in Kroncong revival in early 90s era. Krontjong Kemajoran (lit. 'the Kroncong of Kemayoran') was also the popular one amongst the Javindo community, it is the Bataviaʼs folk songs revived and popularized by both Native Indonesians and Javindo-descent such as Wieteke van Dort, a Surabaya-born singer. Through their revolutionary revival, the Kroncong gained its global popularity especially in Asia (especially in Japan, Taiwan, Malaysia and Singapore), Europe (especially in the Netherlands) and the Americas (especially in Suriname, USA, and Canada).

Since 2015, Keroncong recognized as the local heritage of Java (especially the Greater Jakarta region), and in the following year, 2016, Keroncong is officially recognized and regarded by the Ministry of Education, Culture, Research, and Technology of Republic Indonesia as integral part of the National Intangible Cultural Heritage of Indonesia.

== Characteristics ==
Lgm. Bunga Teratai - Tania Dewi
Example audio of a classic kroncong arrangement featuring cak, cuk, cello, flute, violin, and guitar. Complexly layered to create the genre’s signature soft, rhythmic swing and melodic ornamentation.

The name "Kroncong" may be an onomatopoeia derived from the jingling sound of the kerincing rebana, as heard in the rhythmic background of the music created by the interlocking of instruments playing on- or off-beat. This background rhythm runs faster than the often slow vocals or melody, and is created, typically, by two ukuleles, a cello, a guitar and a bass. These instruments, especially the pair of ukuleles, interlock as do the instruments in a gamelan orchestra, and it is clear that the musical traditions of Indonesia have been applied to an orchestra of European instruments. Previously, they also used the Portuguese musical instrument called cavaquinho, a four steel stringed musical instrument that looks like a guitar; however, cavaquinho was then modified into a prounga, a 3 nylon stringed instrument with low pitch, and a macina, a 4 nylon stringed instrument with high pitch.

One ukulele, called the "cak" (pronounced "chak"), maybe steel-stringed. The instrumentalist strums chords with up to 8 strums per beat in 4/4 rhythm. The off-beat strums are often accentuated. The other ukulele, called the "cuk" (pronounced "chook"), is larger and has 3 gut or nylon strings. The instrumentalist may pluck arpeggios and tremoloes using a plectrum, and the on-beat is emphasised. As a set, the cak and cuk form an interlocking pair that mostly gives Kroncong its characteristic kron and chong.

The cello may have 3 gut or nylon strings and the chords are plucked rapidly, often with a unique skipped-beat using the thumb and one finger. This instrument then adds both rhythm and tone. The guitar may play similarly to either cak or cuk, but plays are often extended scalar runs that provide an undulating background to a chord or bridge chord changes. The bass is often played in a minimalist style reminiscent of the large gongs in a gamelan.

On top of this rhythmic layer, the melody and elaborate ornamentation are carried by a voice, flute, or violin. The violin or flute is used to play introductory passages that are often elaborate. The fills and scalar runs are both faster and more elaborate than the guitar's. The vocalist sings the melody which is slow with sustained notes in traditional Kroncong.

The repertoire largely uses the Western major key with some arrangements in the minor. One departure from this occurs when Kroncong orchestras play Javanese songs (Langgam Jawa). Javanese music ordinarily uses scales and intervals that do not occur in Western music. Kroncong Jawa maintains Western intervals but adopts a 5-tone scale that approximates one of the main Javanese septatonic scales. When playing this style, cak and cuk leave their characteristic interplay and both play arpeggios to approximate the sound and style of the Javanese instrument the siter, a kind of zither. The cello adopts a different rhythmic style as well.

== History ==
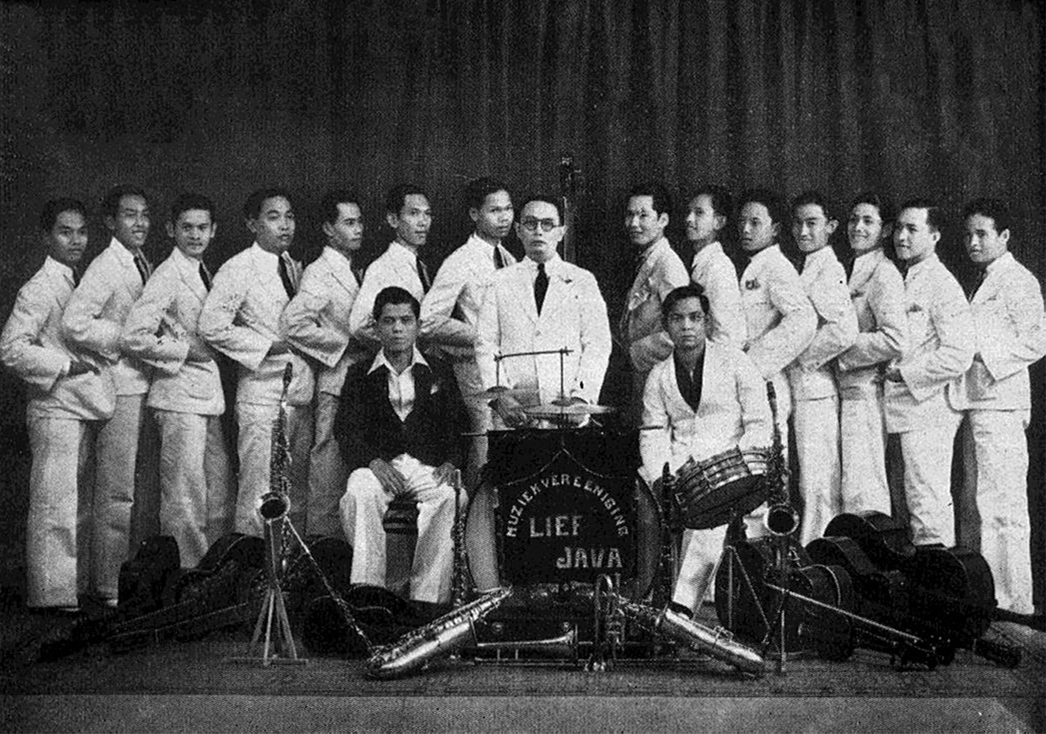
Lief Java Orchestra in Batavia, 1936

Kroncong music began in the 16th century when sailors from the Portuguese Empire brought Portuguese instruments and music to Indonesia. Keroncong music entered Indonesia around 1512, during the Portuguese expeditions led by Afonso de Albuquerque to Malacca and the Moloku Kie Raha (present-day North Maluku) in the Sultanate of Ternate. Portuguese sailors brought with them fado, a form of Portuguese folk song with Arab musical characteristics, typically using minor scales. This influence reflected the period of Moorish Arab rule over Portugal and Spain between 711 and 1492. Lower-class citizens and gangs, commonly called buaya (a reference to buaya darat, a term for playboys literally meaning "crocodile on land") adopted the new musical styles. Eventually, they were assimilated by the upper-class citizens. Paul Fisher writes,

The small kroncong guitar, also the name of a music, is derived from the Portuguese braguinha, sharing its roots with the Hawaiian ukulele. Kroncong music is believed to have originated in the communities of freed Portuguese slaves called Mardijkers in the 16th century. European influence from this time can also be heard in the music of the Batak people of North Sumatra. From the end of the 19th century, the beginnings of guitar accompaniment incorporated within a distinctly Indonesian idiom in music came from Sumatra, South Sulawesi and elsewhere.

In 1661, the Dutch East India Company (VOC) administration freed Portuguese prisoners and slaves from Goa (India) living in Kampung Tugu on the condition that they convert from Catholicism to Protestantism. As a result, the practice of singing fado evolved to align with Protestant church music, which predominantly used major scales.

Subsequently, around 1880, keroncong music emerged as a distinct genre. In its early development, keroncong was also influenced by Hawaiian music, which likewise employed major scales and experienced rapid growth in Indonesia alongside keroncong. This influence can be seen in Ambonese musical traditions and groups such as The Hawaiian Seniors, led by Police Chief Hoegeng.

Some early musical performers and songs of kroncong were common to the musical cultures of Indonesia and Malaysia/Singapore. Some of the 1940s and 1950s Malaysian pop singers had kroncong background.

Kroncong (currently spelled Keroncong in Indonesian) is now considered as old-fashioned folk music by most Indonesian youth, although efforts have been made since the 1960s to modernize the genre by adding electric guitars, keyboards and drums, notably in the so-called Pop Keroncong sung by Hetty Koes Endang. The melancholic spirit of traditional acoustic Kroncong (similar to Portuguese Fado music) has been recorded by Krontjong Poesaka Moresco Toegoe Jakarta-based in Tugu, who have performed at the well-known Indo festival 'Pasar Malam Besar' in The Hague. Considered as a Eurasian art form, Kroncong features prominently each year at the Tong Tong Fair. The genre is also being evolved in new directions by Indo artists in the Netherlands.

== Instrumentation ==
Traditional instrumentation includes the flute, violin, cello, contrabass, cuk (ukulele with 3 nylon strings), cak (ukulele with 4 or 5 metal strings), guitar, and vocalist. Modern kroncong can add other instruments such as saxophone, drum kit, electric guitar, and keyboard.

== Evolution of music ==
=== Early period (1552–1880) ===
From the time when Portuguese sailors landed in Malacca in 1552 and Portuguese slaves were freed in Kampung Tugu (now part of Koja in North Jakarta) in 1661, the genre of music that was to become known as Keroncong has started to take shape. Modern keroncong came into being after 1880, when its main instrument, the ukulele, was invented in Hawaii. The so-called "long evolution" of 1552–1879 was a preliminary stage of development that led to the modern form. Since the 1880s, keroncong is at a stage known as "short evolution".

=== Later evolution (1880–present) ===
The later period is divided into four periods:

==== Tempo Doeloe (1880–1920) ====
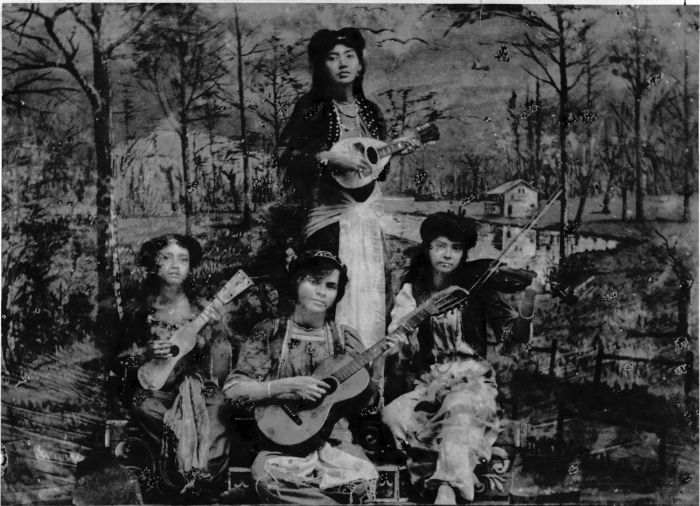
Orchestra of Komedie Stamboel, 1905.

Tempo Doeloe means "olden time". Komedie Stamboel was an Indo touring comedy company that performed folk entertainment, which was very popular between 1891 and 1903, especially in East Java. It performed tales from One Thousand and One Nights, European folk tales, and local folk tales, such as Ali Baba, Cinderella, and Si Pitoeng. They toured by railway and ship to Malaysia and all over Indonesia. Between the scenes, there were musical intermezzos such as marches, polkas, waltzes, and kronchong music called stamboel.

During the Tempo Doeloe (1880–1920), there were 3 types of stamboel song. They usually had 16 bars and were played in a fast tempo (up to 110 beats per minute).

Key to tables:

, – sounded
. – unsounded (tacet)
I – Tonic chord
II# – Supertonic chromatic chord
IV – Subdominant chord
V – Dominant chord
V^{7} – Dominant seventh chord

Stamboel I

Songs in this category include Terang Bulan, Potong Padi, Nina Bobo, Sarinande, O Ina Ni Keke, Bolelebo, and many others. The structure is A – B – A – B or A – B – C – D (16 bars):

I,	,	,	V^{7},
,	,	,	I,
I^{7},	IV,	, V^{7},	I,
,	V7,	,	I,

Stamboel II

Among the songs in this category are Si Jampang and Jali-Jali. The structure is A – B – A – C (16 bars):

I...	....	....	IV,
,	,	, V^{7},	I,
,	,	,	V^{7},
,	,	,	I,

Stamboel III

The structure is Prelude – A – Interlude – B – C (16 bars):

I,	,			(Prelude)
,	,	II#,	V^{7},	
,	IV,			(Interlude)
,	I,	V^{7},	I,	
,	,	V^{7},	I,	

==== Kronchong Eternity (1920–1960) ====
After World War I, American popular music came to Indonesia through ballroom music in hotels. Most of the musicians came from the Philippines. The 32-bar American songs influenced local music; for example Gesang Martohartono composed the song Bengawan Solo during this period. After a while, the center of development moved to Surakarta in Central Java. The kroncong there is slower (typically 80 beats per minute).

Langgam Keroncong

This structure has a binary form, like a pop song: Verse A – Verse A – Bridge B – Verse A (32 bars):

Verse A:	V^{7},	I,	IV, V^{7},	I,	I,	V^{7},	V^{7},	I,
Verse A:	V^{7},	I,	IV, V^{7},	I,	I,	V^{7},	V^{7},	I,
Bridge B:	I7,	IV,	IV, V,	I,	I,	II#,	II#,	V,
Verse A:	V^{7},	I,	IV, V^{7},	I,	I,	V^{7},	V^{7},	I,

Stamboel Keroncong

Stamboel Keroncong has the form (A-B-A-B') x 2 = 16 bars x 2 = 32 bars. It is a modification of the 16-bar stambul II, doubled to give 32 bars.

I...	....	....	IV,
IV,	IV,	IV, V,	I,
I,	I,	I,	V,
V,	V,	V,	I,
I,	I,	I,	IV,
IV,	IV,	IV, V,	I,
I,	I,	I,	V,
V,	V,	V,	I,

Keroncong Asli

Keroncong Asli has A-B-B' structure made up of 8 rows of 4 bars. It begins with a 4-bar instrumental prelude based on the 7th row. After the A section, there is a 4-bar interlude.

V,	I, I^{7},	IV, V^{7},	I,	(prelude)
I,	I,	V,	V,	(A1)
??	II#,	II#,	V,	(A2)
V,	V,	V,	IV,	(interlude)
IV,	IV,	V^{7},	I,	(B1)
I,	V^{7},	V^{7},	I, I^{7},	(B2)
IV, V^{7},	I, I^{7},	IV, V^{7},	I,	(B3)
I,	V^{7},	V^{7},	I,	(B2)

==== Modern Kronchong (1960–2000) ====
Kronchong continued to develop in the vicinity of Surakarta, and some kronchong musicians moved to other parts of Indonesia, like Yogyakarta and Jakarta.

Javanese Genre

Gamelan and other Javanese music also influenced kroncong. The characteristics of Javanese music include: melodies using the Pelog and Slendro (pentatonic) modes; the use of a siter (a plucked stringed instrument), a kendang (a Javanese drum), a kempul (a gong used in gamelan), metal and wood marimbas, gongs, and a unique style of Javanese singing. The songs still follow the binary form used in pop music: A-A-B-A or sometimes A-B-C-D, with 32 bars. In 1958, composer Anjar Any (1936–2008) composed the well-known song "Yen Ing Tawang Ana Lintang" (If there is a star in the sky) and performed it with Waljinah, the winner of a local radio singing contest in Surakarta.

Keroncong Beat

In 1959, Rudy Pirngadie and his Jakarta-based group (Yayasan Tetap Segar / Foundation) used the kronchong beat for accompanying various songs, local and foreign music. He introduced kroncong music to global audiences at the 1964 New York World's Fair. Idris Sardi, an Indonesian violin virtuoso, presented the song "I Left My Heart in San Francisco" with a kronchong beat, but was fined by the US Music Authority for copyright violation.

Campursari

In 1968 at Gunung Kidul, an area near Yogyakarta, a local musician named Manthous introduced Campursari, a mixture of gamelan music and kronchong. Now, it is developing in the vicinity of Surakarta, Sragen and Ngawi.

Koes-Plus

Koes Plus, a rock-pop group from Surakarta, introduced kronchong music in a rock style in 1974 and has produced kronchong-style albums.

==== Millennium Kroncong (2000–present) ====
Kroncong music continues today. The pop music industry has not yet produced popular kroncong, but some groups have been experimenting with it. The Bandung-based group Keroncong Merah Putih has experimented with elements of rap combined with kroncong music in the background. Bondan Prakoso has fused kroncong and hip-hop with his group, Bondan Prakoso & Fade 2 Black. At the Solo International Keroncong Festival in 2008, the Harmony Chinese Music Group added Chinese musical instruments to keroncong, creating a different atmosphere. They called the style Indonesian Chinese Keroncong.

== See also ==
- Dangdut
- Music of Indonesia
