= Bengawan Solo (company) =

Bakery chain in Singapore

- Industry: Baking
- Founded: 1979
- Founder: Anastasia Tjendri-Liew
- Area served: Singapore
- Products: Indonesian baked goods

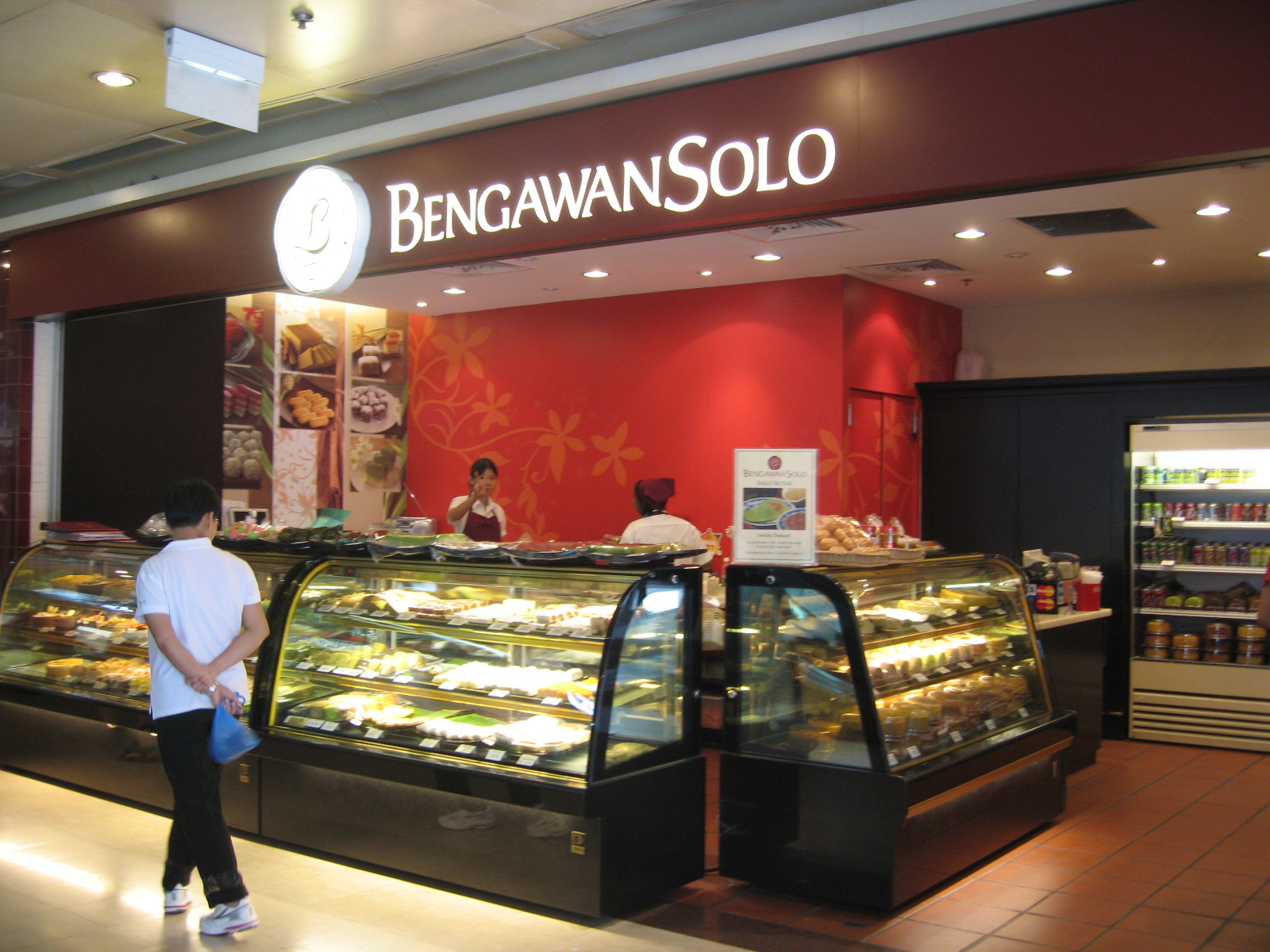
A Bengawan Solo store at The Arcade

Bengawan Solo is a Singaporean bakery chain. It has 45 outlets islandwide with a factory at 23 Woodlands Link. The bakery is known for making and selling Indonesian style kueh, buns, cakes, cookies and mooncakes because the owner and founder, Anastasia Liew, is an Indonesian who migrated to Singapore from Palembang in early 1970s.

All products are prepared at the central kitchen in Woodlands and delivered to the stores 2-3 times daily. Pandan Chiffon, Lapis Cake, Pineapple Tarts, Pandan Cheese Rolls, Lapis Sagu, Ondeh-Ondeh and various cookies are some of the most popular items in the shop.

== History ==
Bengawan Solo was founded in 1975 by Anastasia Tjendri-Liew, an Indonesian-Chinese who emigrated from Palembang, Indonesia to Singapore. Tjendri-Liew had initially started an unlicensed home baking business producing butter, Lapis Sagu, and chiffon cakes in her HDB apartment at Marine Parade, which was popular such that she supplied her products to supermarkets and shops (such as a department store in Lucky Plaza) before officers from the Ministry of Environment shutdown her business in 1979. However, since the demand for Tjendri-Liew's baking products continued, she decided to open a shop in Marine Terrace a few months later. Tjendri-Liew managed to secure a low starting rent of S$1,200 only because the shop was vacant for 1–2 years due to the previous tenants not doing well. She decided to name her business Bengawan Solo, named after the Indonesian song and river of the same name. Her business continued to remain popular, only increasing further following a positive review from a newspaper. Urged by her customers to set up a shop in a more 'central location', Tjendri-Liew opened Bengawan Solo's second outlet in 1983 at Centrepoint shopping mall, Orchard Road. Following the opening of three more outlets, by 1987, Bengawan solo needed a central kitchen. The kitchen, which was a 'first' for Singapore's confectionery industry, was built on a 9,500 sq ft. plot of land in Harvey Road. Other future baking companies followed suit, utilising a 'centre kitchen' to supply its outlets.
