= Cak (instrument) =

Java (Indonesian) traditional musical instruments

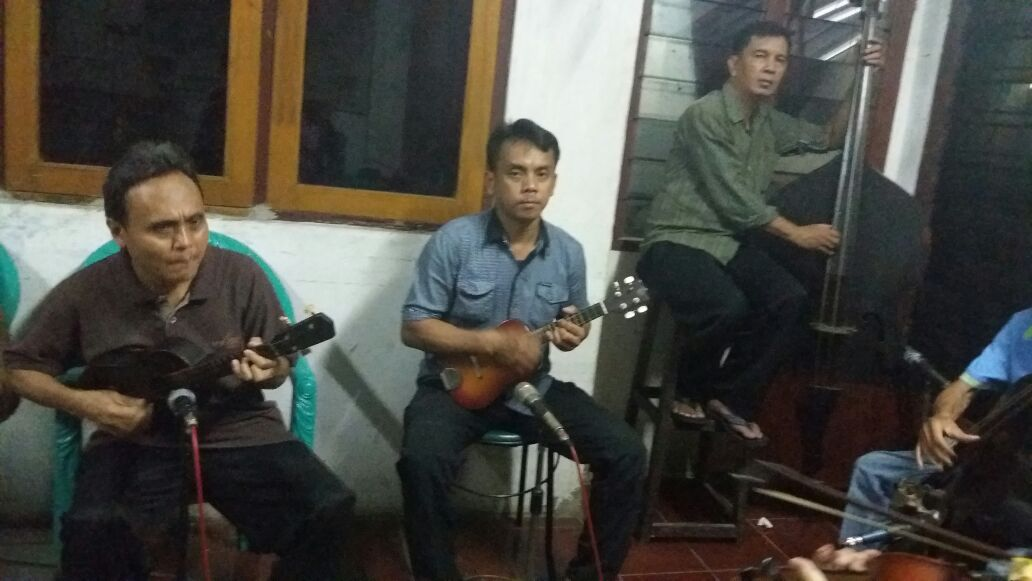
- The instrument being played as part of a keroncong group. The Cuk is on the left and the Cak is on the right.

String instrument
- Classification: String instrument
- Hornbostel–Sachs classification: (Composite chordophone)
- Developed: Java (Indonesia)

Related instruments
- Cuk (instrument), Ukulele, Cavaquinho, Banjo

The Cak is a stringed musical instrument from Java (Indonesia). It has four strings in three courses. It is tuned D5 D5, F#4, B4. The strings are made of steel.

The body is usually hollowed out of a solid piece of wood. The soundboard has many little soundholes arranged in a geometric pattern. It is mainly used to play Keroncong music along with the Cuk.

== History ==
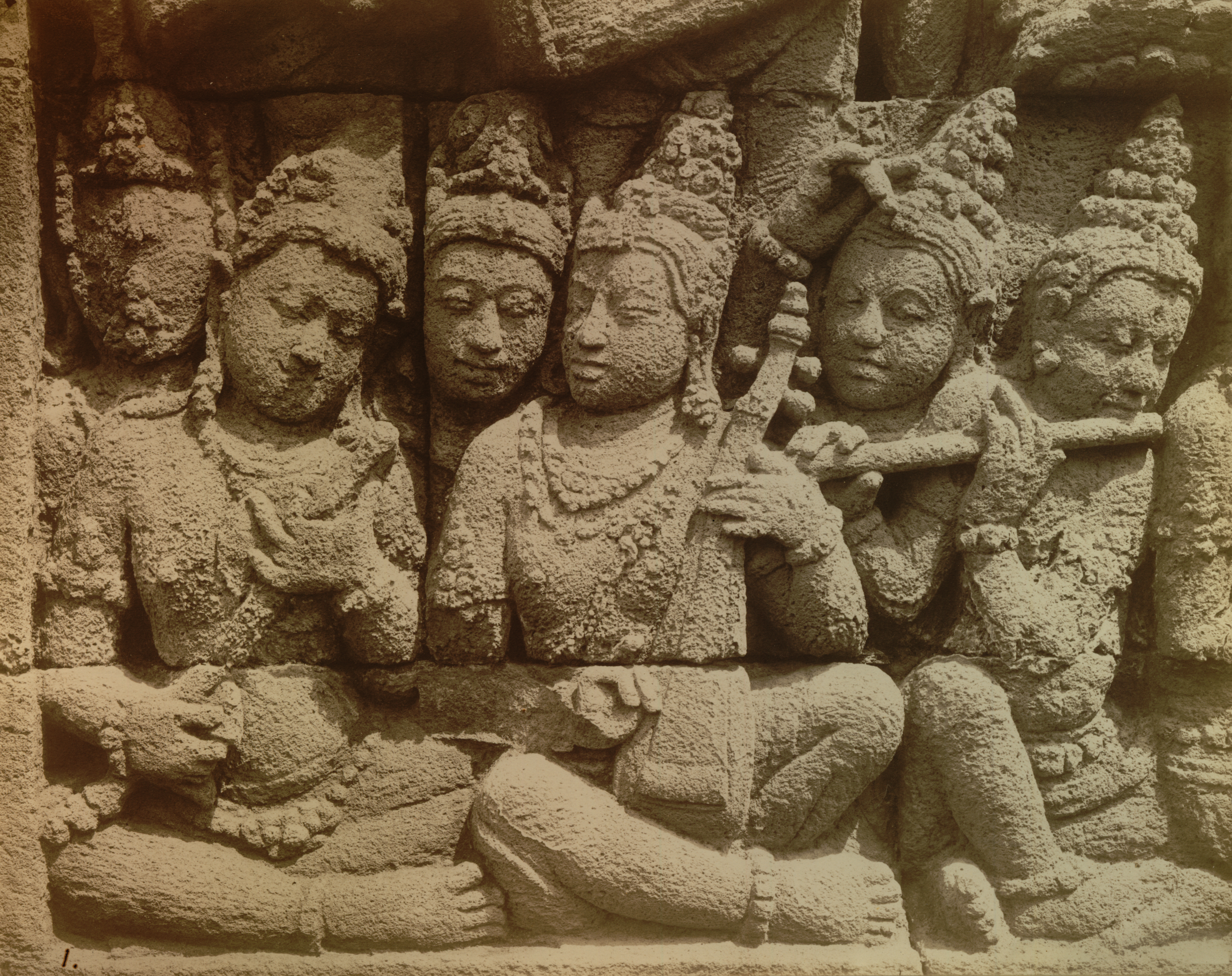
The depiction of Ancient Javaʼs plucked instrument on Borobudur bas-reliefs – 8th century temple in Central Java.

The Cak is thought to be evolved from a banjo, but developed as a small-sized wooden front and a guitar-shaped body. However, the earlier period in Ancient Java shows clear evidences that the native Javanese were already familiar with the small plucked instrument.
