= Bangka Island (North Sulawesi) =

Island in Indonesia

Coordinates: 1.788°N 125.149°E

Bangka
Native name: Palau Bangka
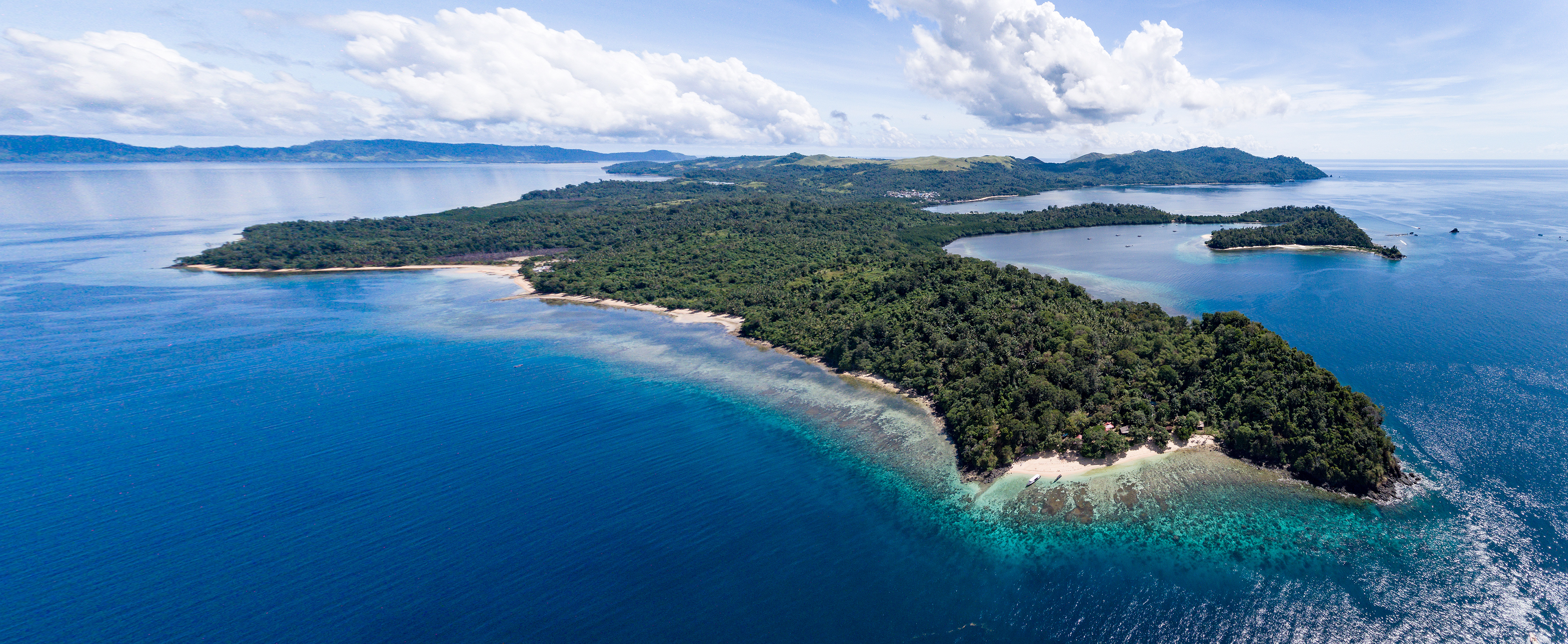
- Interactive map of Bangka

Geography
- Location: Pacific Ocean
- Adjacent to: Celebes Sea; Molucca Sea
- Area: 47.78 km^{2} (18.45 sq mi)

Administration
- Indonesia
- Province: North Sulawesi

Demographics
- Demonym: Bangkish
- Population: 2,397 (2010)

Bangka Island is a small island located off the northeastern tip of Sulawesi, Indonesia. Bangka is known for its unspoiled beaches and dive tourism. It belongs administratively to the district of East Likupang in the North Minahasa regency, North Sulawesi province. The island has three main coastal villages: Lihunu, Kahuku, and Libas. Controversy exists over a Chinese company's development of an iron ore mining facility on the island, as the company's permits were revoked by Indonesian courts.

== Geography ==
Bangka is located in the western Pacific Ocean, between the Celebes Sea (Laut Sulawesi) to the west and the Molucca Sea to the east. Bangka is southwest of Biaro Island, separated by the Bangka Passage. Just west of Bangka are the islands of Kinabohutan, Talisei, Tindila, and Gangga.

Bangka has an area of 4,778 hectares. The geographical faces of the island include forests, hills, coconut plantations, rocky outcrops, mangroves and pristine beaches.

The largest village is Lihunu, followed by Kahuku and Libas.

== Economy ==
Local commerce involves selling fish and agricultural products such as coconuts, copra, cloves, maize and vegetables. Some locals are also employed by the island's five eco-tourism ventures, which specialize in diving and snorkeling. Tourism: Bangka's popularity as international tourism destination has increased since its first dive resort was opened in 1987. Most of the sandy beaches and coral reefs attractive to tourists are located at the southwestern and southern parts of the island. The northern coastline is rockier and its waters contain more seagrass than spectacular coral.

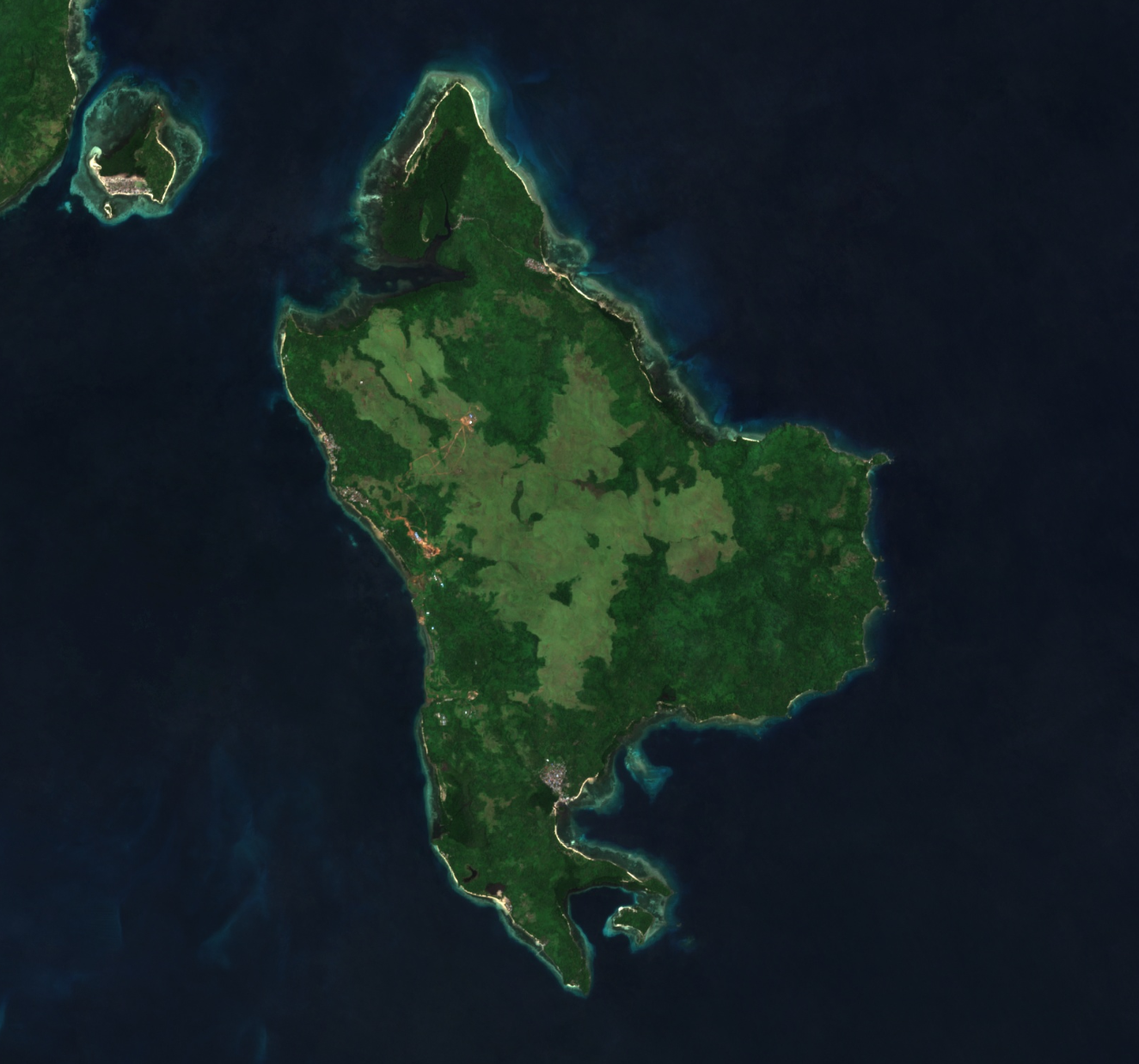
A satellite image of Bangka Island, Sulawesi, 2022.

== Demography ==
Most residents are from the Sangihe-Siao ethnic group. According to the 2000 census, the population of the island's three villages totaled 2,649 (Lihunu 1,162, Kahuku 983 and Libas 504). In 2010 the population of the villages had declined to 2,397 (Lihunu 1,029, Kahuku 938 and Libas 430). Other residents live outside the villages and at the five resorts.

Most of the population is split between those who work as fishermen and those who work as farmers. Other islanders work as civil servants, teachers, on resorts or other occupations.

== Environment ==
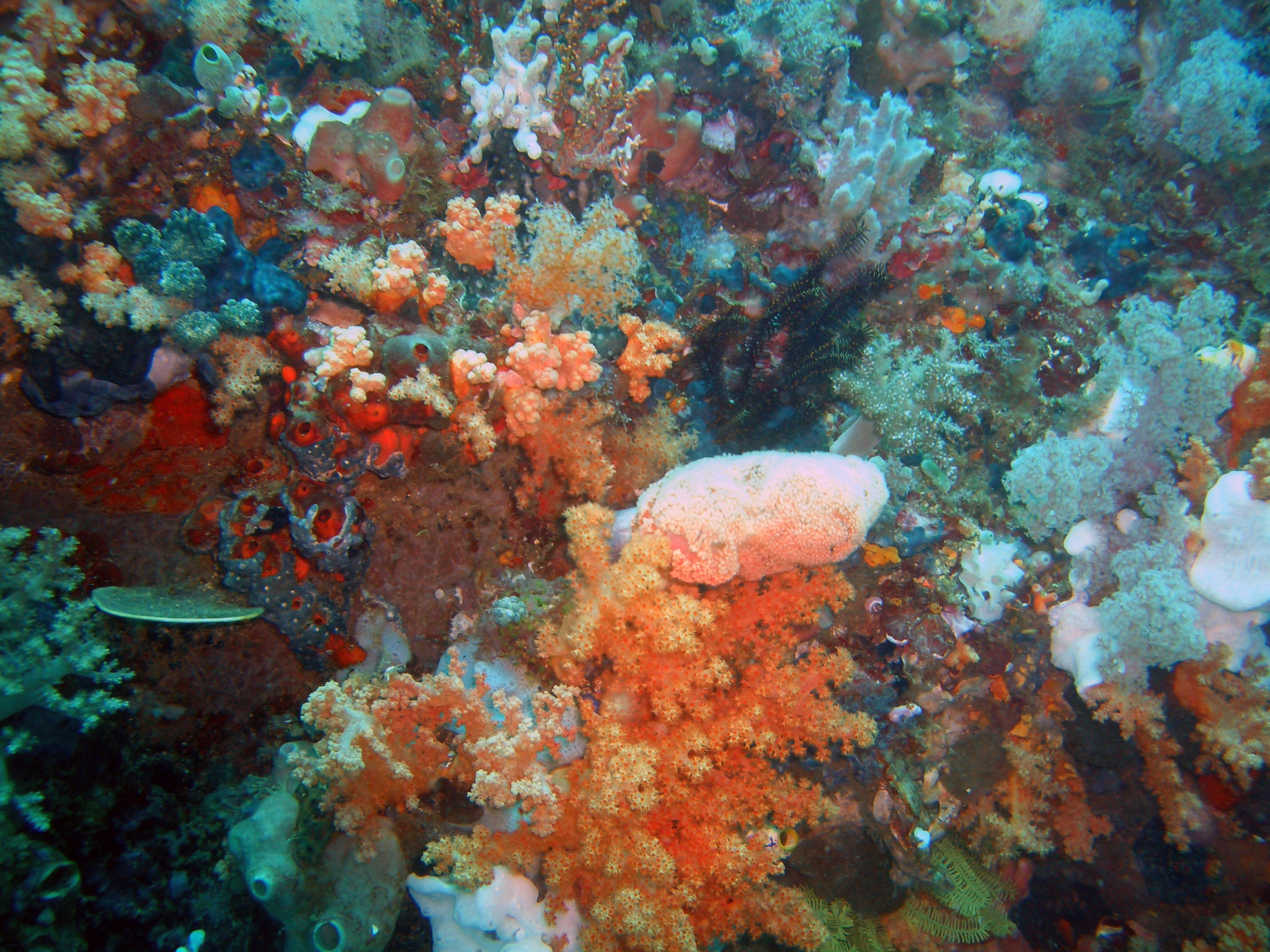
Manado Coral Garden, divings in Bangka Island, North Sulawesi

Small-scale clearing of forest has taken place for several decades, leaving just grass cover on parts of the hilly interior. The island's land also includes forests, orchards, shrubs, and coconut plantations. Mangroves cover just 1.98% (58.7 hectares) of the island. Part of the island's mangrove forests and coral reefs were destroyed after a Chinese mining company in 2014 began developing an iron ore mine, despite its permits being revoked by Indonesian courts.

Ecologically, Bangka and its waters contain an abundance of biodiversity. Land animals include Javanese deer (Rusa timorensis), tarsier (Carlito syrichta - a nocturnal arboreal primate), common cuscus (Phalanger orientalis), Asian water monitor lizard (Varanus salvator) and wild boar (Sus scrofa). There are many coral reefs that attract tropical fish species, such as Napoleon fish, frogfish, pygmy seahorses and nudibranchs, as well as dugongs: a species of protected marine mammal. Dugongs are known to dwell and feed in waters off the island's coast. Also present is a species of tubular marine sponge, the Petrosia nigricans, from which four new purine derivatives have been isolated.

Bangka Island is located close to Bunaken Marine National Park, a popular marine-based international tourism destination. Bangka does not have protected marine park status. The area around Bangka lies on a whale migration path.

== Mining controversy ==
The Regent of North Minahasa, Sompie Singal, in 2008 issued a permit to PT Mikgro Metal Perdana (PT MMP), a subsidiary of the Hong Kong-based Aempire Resource Group, to explore for iron ore on Bangka. The Regent twice extended the permit: first on 20 July 2010, and then again on 20 July 2012. The concession area covered 2,000 hectares and the 2012 extension was broadened to cover "iron ore and other minerals". Many Bangka residents and the local tourism operators opposed the mining plan, fearing a full-scale mining operation and pollution would devastate the island's fragile ecosystem and destroy traditional livelihoods and eco-tourism. Residents and the tourism operators sued the Regent and PT MMP in an effort to prevent the mining. Their lawsuit was partly based on the fact that Bangka is defined as a small island under Law No.27/2007 on the Management of Coastal Areas and Small Islands. This law states that mining is illegal on islands smaller than 2,000 km^{2}. Bangka has a surface area of just about 48 km^{2}.

PT MMP and local government officials pressed ahead with the mining plan, insisting it would bring economic benefits. The Director of PT MMP, Yang Yongjian, accused a non-government organization of masterminding anti-mining protests in an effort to extort money from his company, but he did not name the NGO. Manado Administrative Court (in Decision No.04/G.TUN/2012/PTUN.MDO) on 30 August 2012, rejected a lawsuit by Bangka residents and tourism operators to cancel the exploration permit. The plaintiffs successfully appealed at the High Administrative Court of Makassar, South Sulawesi, which on 1 March 2013 (in Decision No.165/B.TUN/2012/PT.TUN.MKS) overturned the Manado Court's ruling. The judges accepted all points of the plaintiffs' case. The verdict revoked the exploration permits and their extensions. The Regent and PT MMP rejected this verdict and appealed to the Supreme Court in Jakarta. On 23 September 2013, the Supreme Court dismissed their appeal. As stipulated in Government Regulation No.26/2008 on National Spatial Planning and Government Regulation No.50/2011 on National Tourism Development Planning, Bunaken National Park and its “surrounding areas” should be regarded as a strategic area for marine tourism, conservation and fishing.

Almost the entire concession area of 2,000 hectares granted to PT MMP has Limited Production Forest Zone status. Therefore, a special permit must be obtained from the Forestry Ministry, through the North Sulawesi Governor, prior to exploration activities. This was not obtained, so PT MMP's exploration permit was ruled a violation of Law No.41/1999 on Forestry. Local civil servants, including school teachers, were accused of intimidating locals opposed to the mining plan. A campaign to prevent the planned mining gained national attention after receiving support from veteran Indonesian rock band Slank. Divers warned that pollution from mining at Bangka would lead to the destruction of marine life and nearby marine tourism sites.

PT MMP's production permit had been issued on 17 July 2014 by Energy and Mineral Resources Minister Jero Wacik, who in 2016 was jailed for corruption. The Supreme Court on 11 August 2016 accepted a lawsuit by Bangka residents to cancel PT MMP's production permit. The Supreme Court ruling was not enforced until Energy and Mineral Resources Minister Ignasius Jonan issued a decree on 23 March 2017, formally revoking the permit.

PT MMP responded by attempting to re-activate its permits. Yang Yonjian complained the revocation was a violation of a "Peace Deed" signed between PT MMP and a representative of the Energy and Mineral Resources Ministry on 15 June 2016. Under the terms of the deed, which was made by a notary in East Jakarta, the Ministry's representative agreed to "waive" the implementation of a court ruling against PT MMP and that no further lawsuits would be made against PT MMP. Yang accused some government administrative agencies of conspiring with criminal syndicates to mix up judicial authority, resulting in what he claimed was the wrongful revocation of his company's production permit. He claimed the revocation was an abuse of authority that violated Law 30 of 2014 on Government Administration.

On 5 December 2018, the Energy and Mineral Resources Ministry's Legal Bureau held a meeting with officials of the Environment and Forestry Ministry, the Director General of Marine Management of the Fisheries and Maritime Resources Ministry and the deputy for Investment Services at the Investment Coordinating Board (BKPM). The meeting resulted in the issuance of a document formally rejecting PT MMP's efforts to re-activate its production permit. PT MMP, which had invested $105 million in developing its iron ore production facility, responded by demanding sanctions against the state officials who attended the meeting.
