= Langgam jawa =

Indonesian music genre

Langgam jawa is a regional form of Indonesian kroncong music most often associated with the city of Surakarta (Solo). As is the case with traditional kroncong music, langgam jawa utilizes a variety of non-native instruments, such as the flute, guitar, ukulele, cello and violin. However, these instruments are performed using a seven-tone Javanese gamelan scale known as pelog. The cello typically plays the role of a gamelan ciblon drum, with the performer slowly plucking or slapping the strings in a percussive fashion.

Langgam jawa's roots can be traced back to kroncong ensembles going back to the 1920s, but emerged as a style of its own in the 1950s. Among the leading exponents of the style is Andjar Any. He and his ensemble, Orkes Kroncong Bintang Nusantara, are said to have composed over 2000 songs in the langgam jawa style.

== See also ==
- Gamelan
- Kroncong
- Music of Java
- Music of Indonesia

== Sources ==
- Music of Indonesia [Series]. Ed. by Philip Yampolsky. Washington, DC: Smithsonian/Folkways, 1990–1999. 20 Compact Discs with Liner Notes. Bibliography.
  - Vol. 2 (1991): Indonesian Popular Music: Kroncong, Dangdut, & Langgam Jawa.
