= Pandan cake =

Indonesian cake

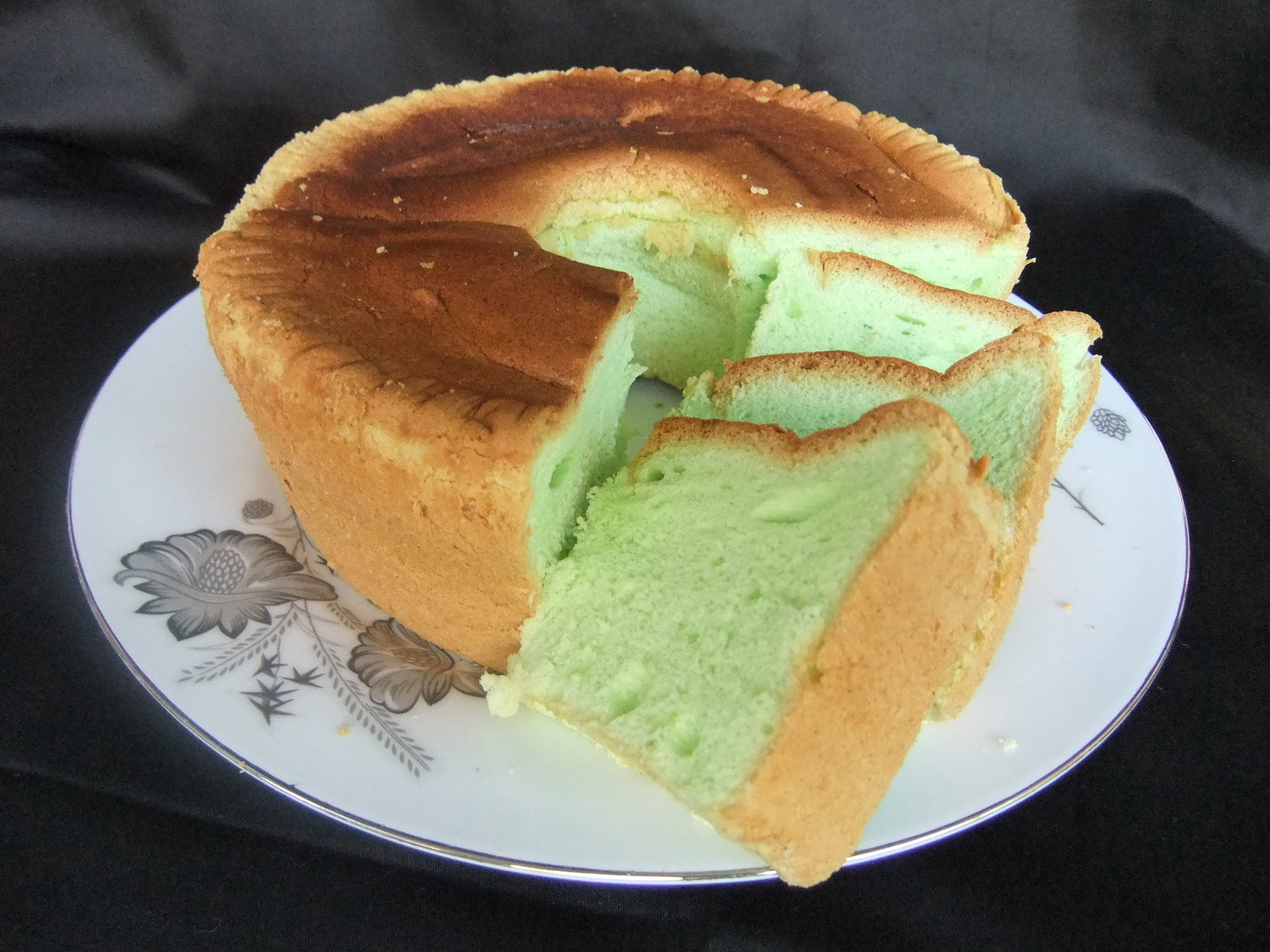
- Pandan cake
- Alternative names: Pandan chiffon cake
- Type: Cake
- Region or state: Southeast Asia
- Associated cuisine: Malaysia, Indonesia, Singapore
- Main ingredients: Juice of pandan leaves or Pandanus extract, flour, eggs, sugar, butter or margarine

Pandan cake is a light, fluffy, green-coloured sponge cake flavoured with the juices of Pandanus amaryllifolius leaves. It is also known as pandan chiffon. The cake is popular in Malaysia, Indonesia, Singapore, Vietnam, Cambodia, Laos, Thailand, Sri Lanka, Hong Kong, China, and the Netherlands.

== Ingredients ==
The cake shares many common ingredients with other cakes, such as flour, eggs, butter or margarine, and sugar. The cake's distinct ingredient is the pandan leaf, which gives the cake its iconic green colour. Occasionally, the cakes will contain ingredients with green food colouring to further emphasize the green hue. The cakes are not always made with the leaf juice, as they can be flavoured with Pandanus extract, in which case colouring is only added if a green hue is desired. Freshly squeezed juices from pandan leaves also give the cake a stronger aroma compared to pre-juiced essences.

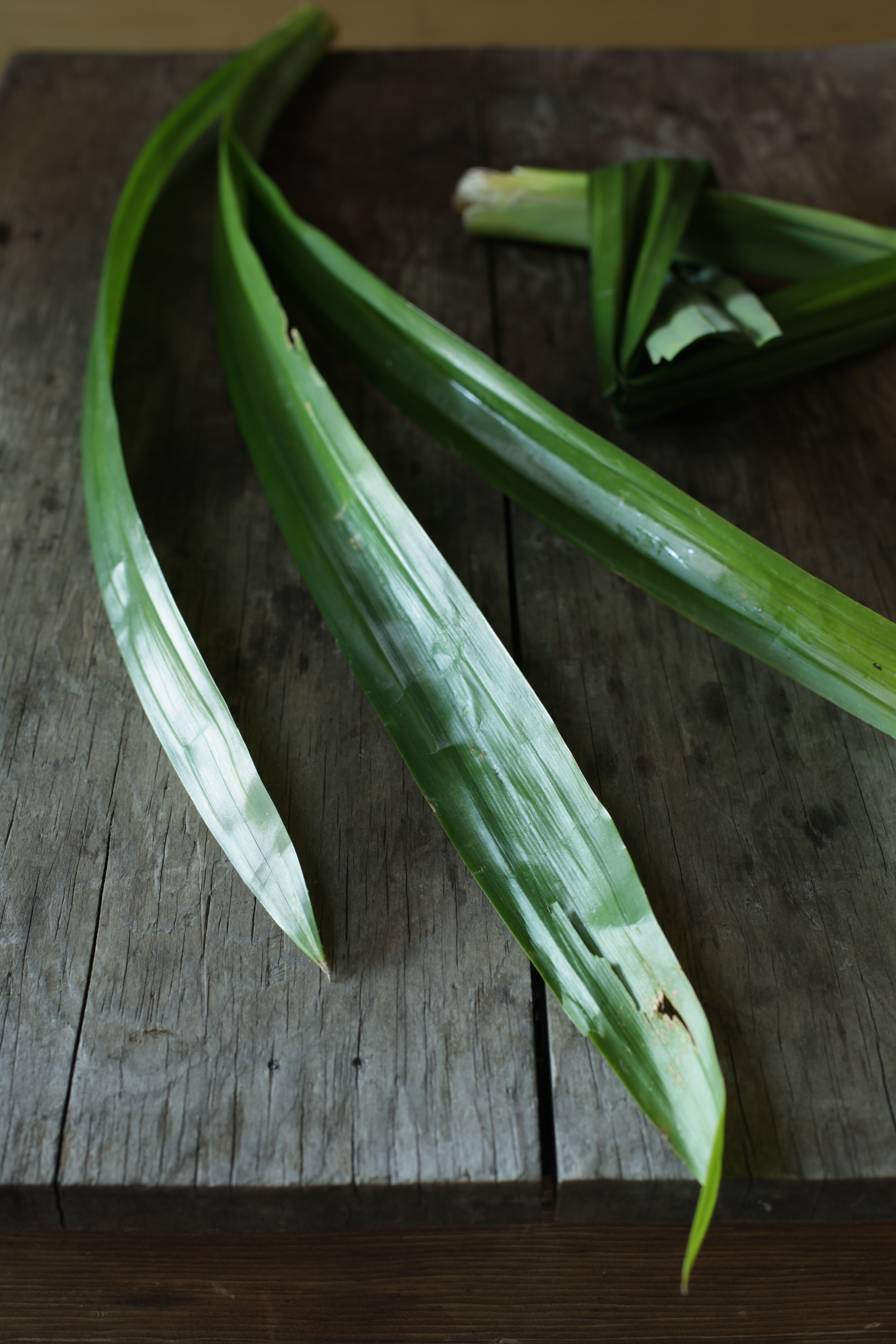
Pandan leaf, the primary ingredient for the colour and taste of a pandan cake

The pandan cake common in Indonesia, the Netherlands, and Singapore is a soft sponge cake akin to the chiffon cake, made without any additional coating or frosting. Most pandan cakes will sport a brown outer crust. Many recipes also call for the pandan cake to be cooled upside down, which is a technique often used with various chiffon cakes to prevent the cake from flattening out, giving it its fluffy structure.

== History and origin ==
In Southeast Asia, cake-making techniques were brought into the region through European colonization. Malaysia and Singapore were British possessions, whilst Indonesia was a Dutch colony. European colonists brought their cuisine along with them, with the most obvious impacts in bread, cake, and pastry-making techniques. The pandan plant is believed to be native to the Moluccas islands of Indonesia. The plant is now commonly found throughout Southeast Asia. In Southeast Asian cuisine, the pandan leaf is a favourite flavouring agent used to give off a pleasant aroma, and can be added to various dishes including fragrant coconut rice, traditional cakes, and other sweet desserts and drinks.

In 2017, CNN named the pandan cake the national cake of Singapore and Malaysia. In Singapore pandan cake was popularised by one of the city's most popular bakeries, Bengawan Solo, a cake shop owned by a Singaporean citizen of Indonesian origin. Bengawan Solo and their pandan cakes are especially popular among tourists visiting Singapore, particularly those from Hong Kong and mainland China. Other bakeries that carry pandan cake in Singapore include Old Seng Choong. During the 2020 pandemic, there was increased social media interest in a rivalry between these two shops and their pandan cakes.

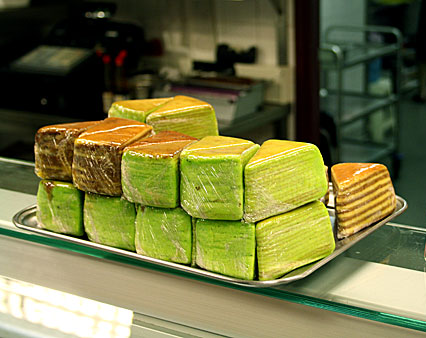
Green pandan is also used as flavouring and colouring agent in other Dutch-Indonesian cake spekkoek (lapis legit) sold in an Indo (Eurasian) shop in Amsterdam.

According to CNN Indonesia, pandan cake originated from Indonesia, and can be traced to the cake-making techniques of Dutch colonists in the Dutch East Indies (now Indonesia). The colonial Dutch and Indo peoples combined cake-making techniques from Europe with local ingredients like the pandan leaf as flavouring and colouring agents. However, the modern pandan chiffon cake can be more directly traced back to 20th century America.

Pandan cake is quite popular in the Netherlands due to its historical link to Indonesia. Other than its use in chiffon pandan cake, pandan leaf is also used as green colouring and flavouring in the Dutch-Indonesian favourite pandan spekkoek or lapis legit (layered cake). In recent years, pandan has grown in popularity internationally, especially in the United States, where typical western dishes are now implementing pandan as a flavouring agent and garnish.

== Variations ==
One of the main variations of pandan chiffon cake is the modern (as opposed to the traditional) pandan chiffon cake. Bengawan Solo, a cake shop in Singapore, is well known for its traditional pandan chiffon cake and its distinctive pandan flavor. Bengawan Solo also makes cakes with chocolate and yuzu flavors, but with a different recipe than the original pandan flavor.

Within the Philippines, there is a smaller pandan chiffon cake, the buko pandan mamom. This smaller cake contains coconut milk and pandan flavors. The recipe features dense and buttery textures, which are typical of Filipino cuisine.

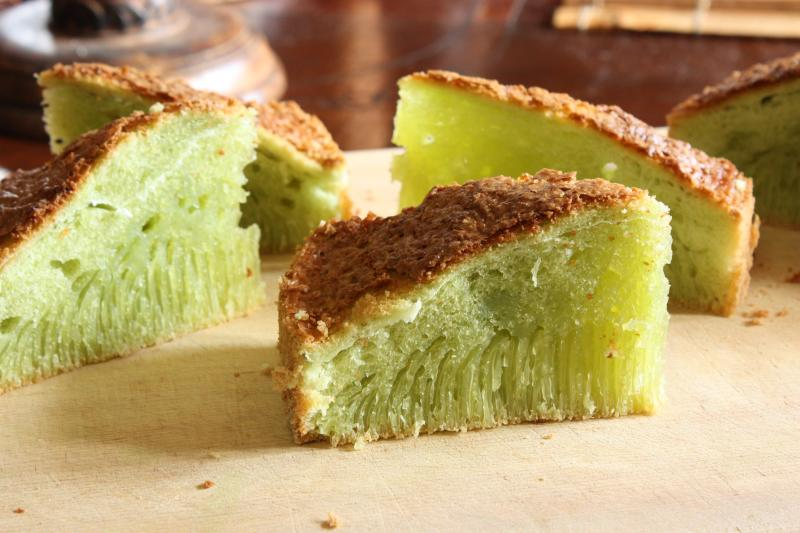
Vietnamese pandan cake

In Vietnam, there is the bánh bò nướng, the honeycomb cake, which contains coconut and pandan flavors. Due to the tapioca starch in the recipe, it has a chewy texture, completely different from a chiffon cake. When baked, the inside resembles the structure of a honeycomb.

== Names in different languages ==
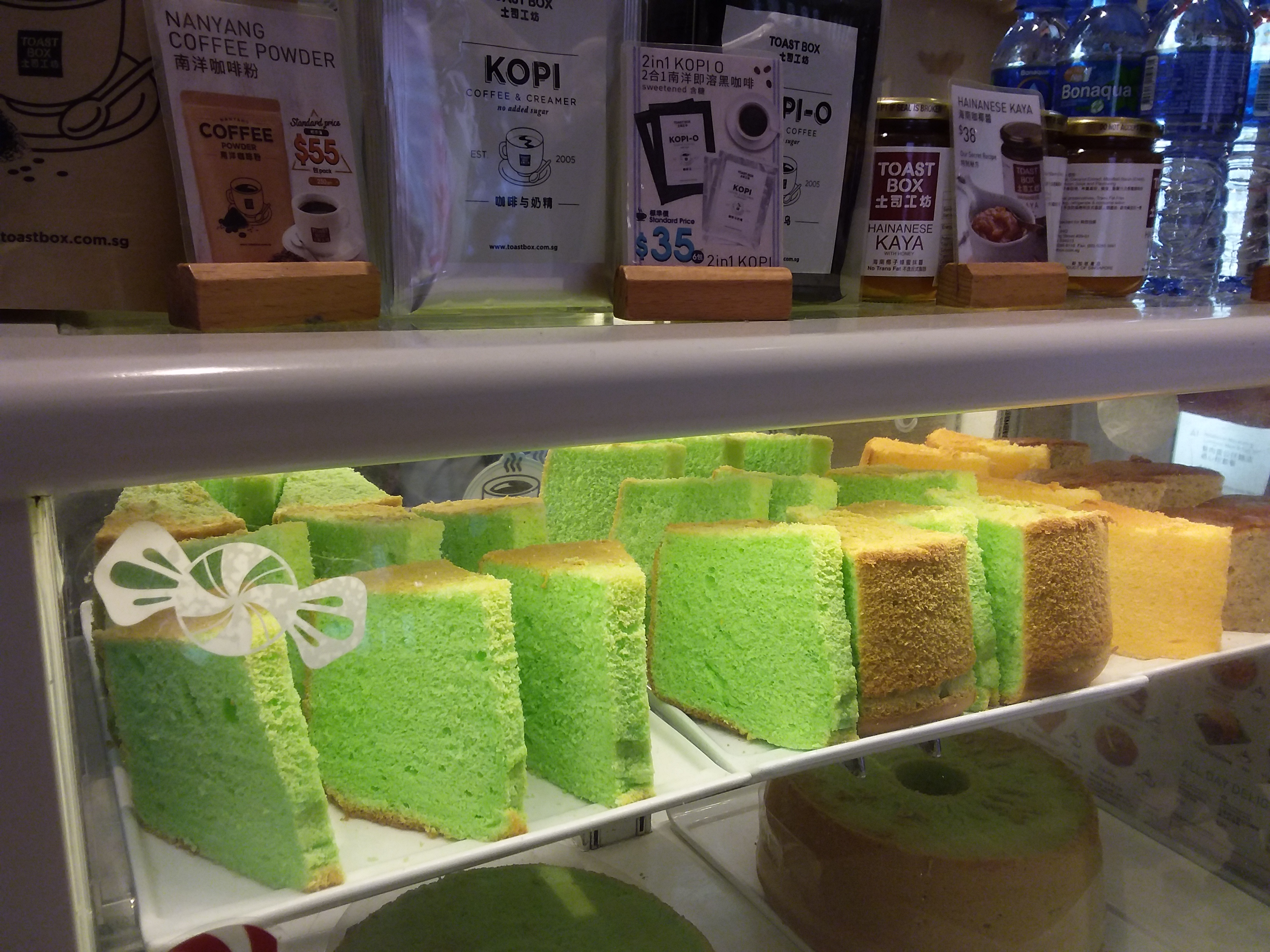
Pandan cakes in Hong Kong

- Mandarin: 香蘭蛋糕; xiānglán dàngāo
- Malaysian: kek pandan
- Indonesian: bolu pandan
- Dutch: pandan cake
- Khmer: Num Sleok Touy
- Vietnamese: Bánh pho sĩ, bánh lá dứa
- Cantonese: 班蘭蛋糕; baan1 laan4 daan6 gou1
- Sinhalese: පණ්ඩන් කේක්
- Thai: เค้กใบเตย khêk bı tey

== See also ==
- Kue bolu
- Coconut cake
- Ube cake
- Mango cake
- Mamón
