= Waldjinah =

Indonesian traditional singer

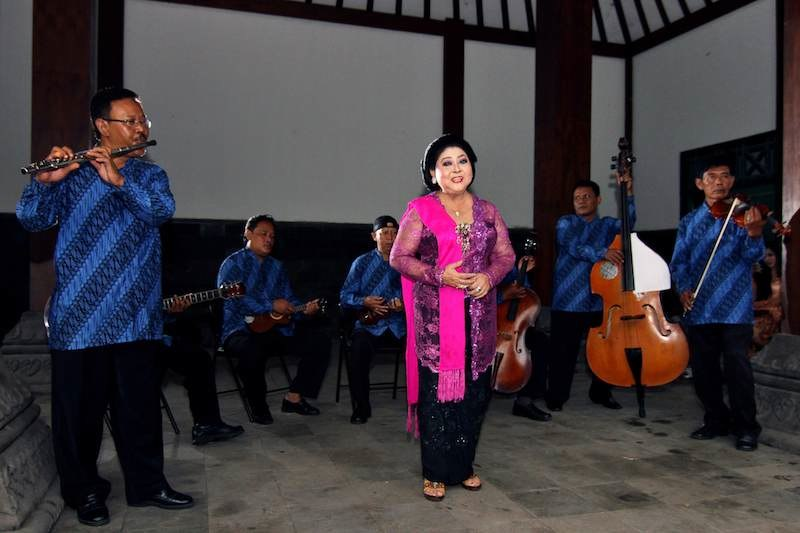
Waldjinah at the 55th Tong Tong Fair at The Hague in 2013

Waldjinah (born 7 November 1945) is an Indonesian traditional singer. She is most known for the song Walang Kekek, which made Javanese kroncong music known throughout Indonesia. She has also worked with other Indonesian artists, including Gesang Martohartono and Ismail Marzuki.

== Early life and career ==
Waldjinah was born in Surakarta, Indonesia, on 7 November 1945 as the tenth child of her family. Her mother sold food in a market and her father worked as a painter in a batik factory. Waldjinah was inspired to become a singer from listening to traditional Javanese songs at the factory where her father worked. During her high school years, she became interested in keroncong music.

In 1958, Waldjinah entered a singing competition held by the Radio Republik Indonesia radio station in Surakarta. After winning the competition, her professional career began and she became a celebrity. In 1960, she was voted the singer with most potential at a national competition in Jakarta.

Waldjinah has recorded 200 albums and over 1500 songs. She is known for the hit song "Walang Kekek", which made Javanese keroncong music known throughout Indonesia. She has worked with other Indonesian artists, including Gesang Martohartono, Mus Mulyadi, Andjar Any, and Ismail Marzuki.

== Personal life ==
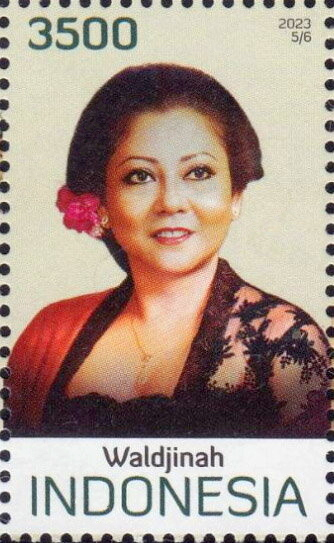
Waldjinah on a 2023 stamp of Indonesia

Waldjinah's first husband managed her own career as well as her backing band, Orkes Keroncong Bintang Surakarta. He died in 1985. She met her second husband four years later, who also worked as her manager. She has five children, as well as eight grandchildren and three great-grandchildren. Her son Ary Mulyono, an accomplished instrumentalist who also with keroncong, is leader of her backing band.

Waldjinah owns the Galeri Walang Kekek, an art gallery located in Grogol, Sukoharjo which exhibits her collection of batik cloth.

== Discography ==
- Ratu Kembang Katjang (1967, Lokananta)
- Putri Solo Vol. 1 (1967, Elshinta)
- Putri Gunung Vol. 2 (1968, Elshinta)
- Ngelam-Lami (1968, Lokananta)
- Walang Kekek (1968, Elshinta)
- Langgam Jawa Terpopuler (1983, Fajar)
- Langgam Jawa (1993, Nirwana)
- Ratu Jawa (2004, Rice)
