= Tong Tong Fair =

Cultural festival and fair in the Netherlands

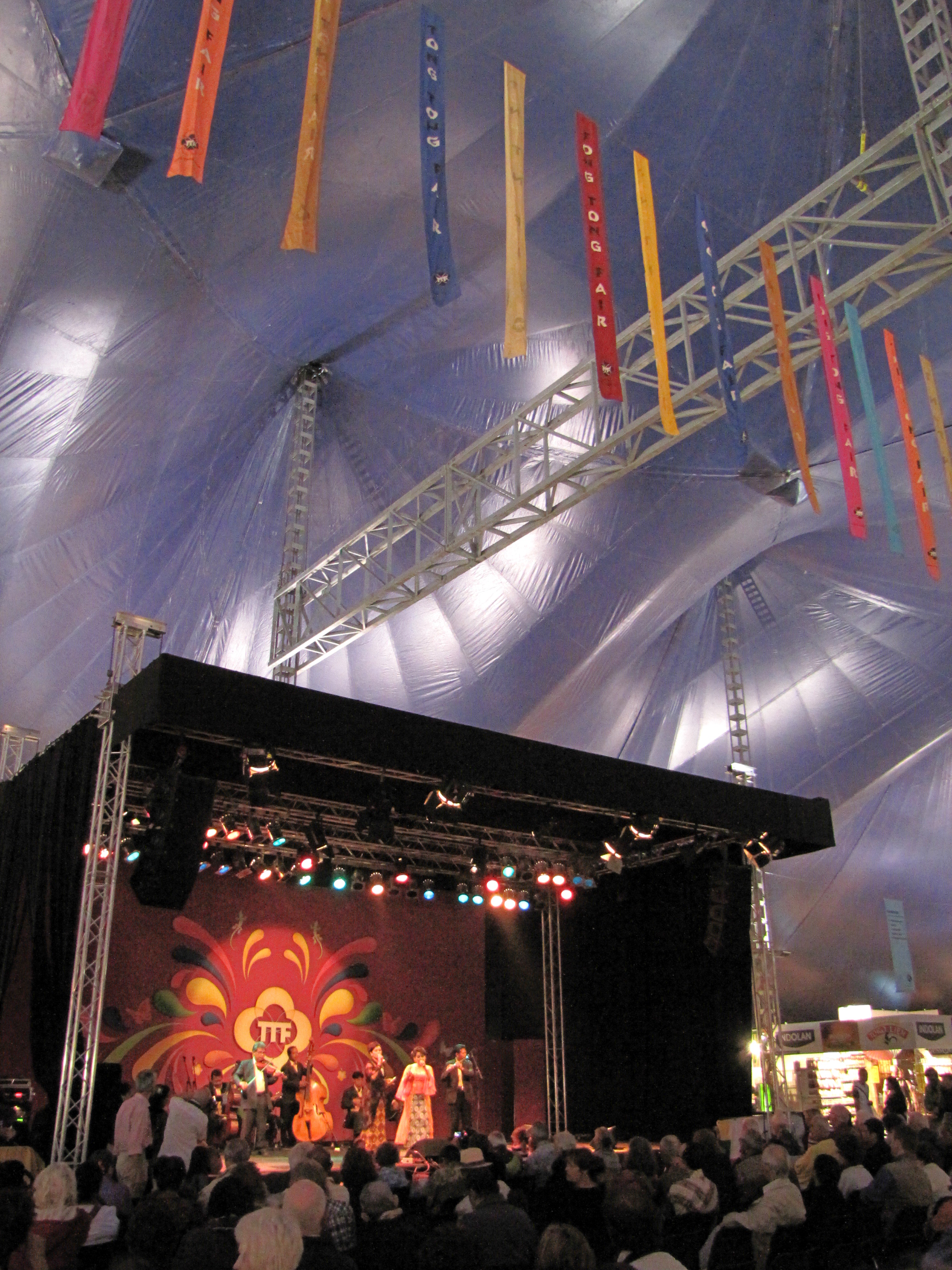
Tong Tong Fair in 2011

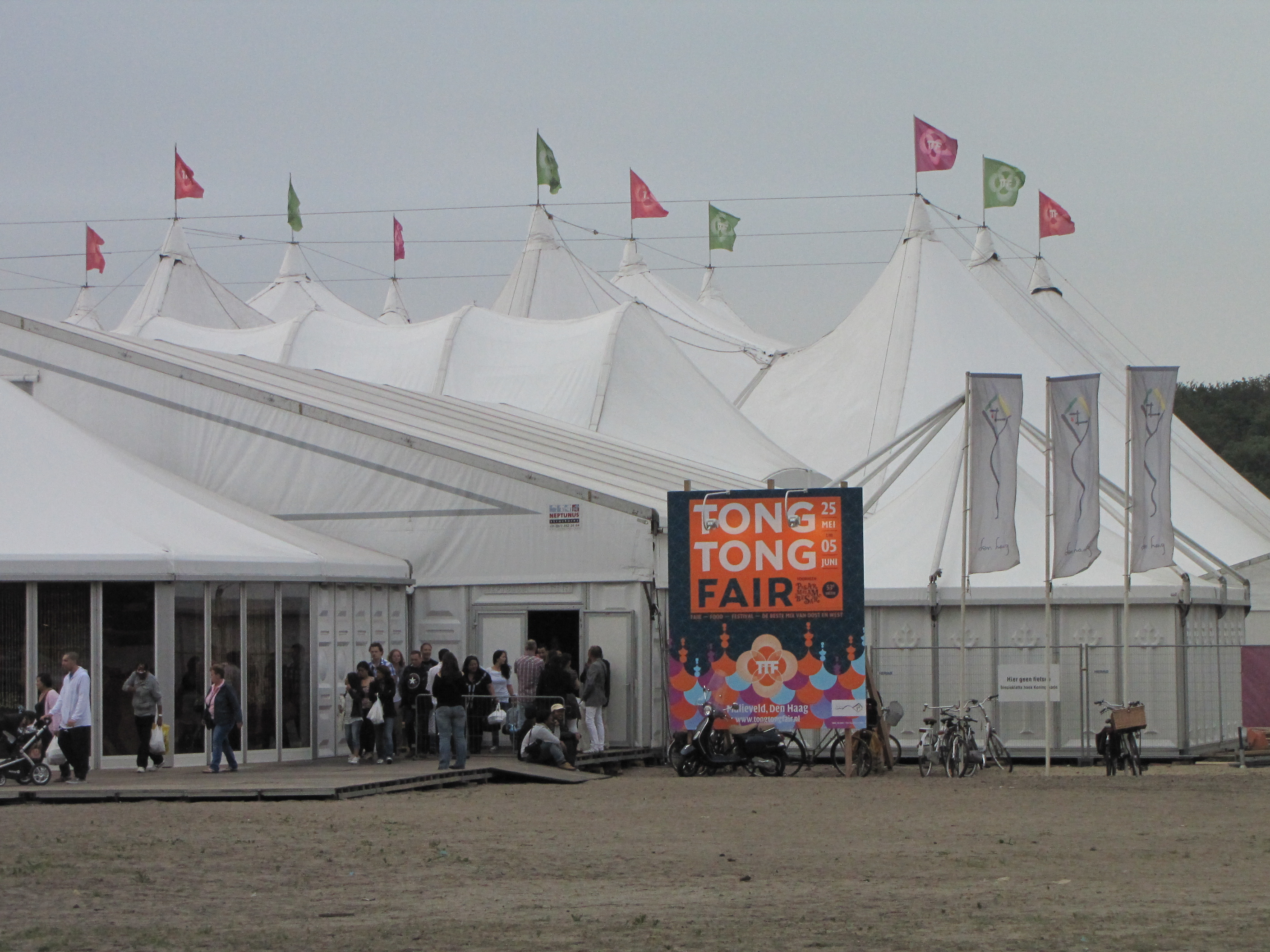
From the outside

The Tong Tong Fair (formerly known as Pasar Malam Besar) was the largest festival in the world for Indo (European-Indonesian) culture, held annually in the Netherlands. In 2009 it was renamed to 'Tong Tong Fair'. Established in 1959 it was one of the oldest festivals and the fourth largest grand fair in the Netherlands. It was also the annual event with the highest number of paying visitors of the Dutch city of The Hague, having consistently attracted more than 100,000 visitors since 1993.

The name ‘'Pasar Malam Besar’' is derived from the Indonesian/Malay language and literally means ‘Great Night Market’. The new name was chosen to emphasise its link with the 'Tong Tong Foundation' and its cultural mission. Another reason was to distinguish oneself from the many other fairs under the name pasar malam.

The fair was raised every summer on its dedicated fairground, called the ‘Malieveld’, close to the central train station of The Hague. 22.000 m² of festival terrain and many, mostly Indo, volunteers facilitated visitors from both the Netherlands and abroad. The festival hosted three popular food courts, a culinary theatre, many large to medium stages for performance art, workshop areas, areas for lecture and interviews, market areas, as well as specific fair areas for trading merchandise.

In May 2024, the fair collapsed financially shortly before its planned 64th edition. After the festival was cancelled because the organisers could no longer meet essential obligations, the District Court of The Hague declared Tong Tong Holding B.V. and Pasar Malam Besar B.V. bankrupt on 14 May 2024. The organisation had been weakened by losses during the COVID-19 years, rising production costs and disappointing attendance in 2023; the immediate trigger was the failure to secure an overbridging loan from the municipality or banks.

== History ==
In defiance of government pressure to assimilate into Dutch society, a group of outspoken and independent Indos, organized in the so-called ‘Indies Cultural Circle’, assembled around famous Indo intellectual Tjalie Robinson. One of their accomplishments was the founding of the Pasar Malam Besar in 1959. Its continued success in attracting visitors of all generations and presenting a diverse and progressive programme, while preserving the centuries-old cultural ties with the Indonesian Archipelago has gone beyond their expectations. In 2003 HM Queen Beatrix herself officially opened the 45th Pasar Malam Besar. The royal opening was repeated in 2008 for its 50th edition, which was the last time the name Pasar Malam Besar was used.

Since the Indonesian National Revolution and the expulsion of all Dutch citizens from the Republic of Indonesia, the consequent fall out between the Netherlands and Indonesia has led to a long freeze of political, economical and even academic and cultural relations between the 2 nations. To a degree, this has lasted well into the 21st century. The Tong Tong Fair has always attempted to rekindle and foster those relations and since the 1970s consistently invited Indonesian artisans to the event. It was here that for instance the Royal princesses of Solo, daughters of Pakubuwono XII, performed the exclusive Serimpi dances in 1985. It was the first time in history that members of the Surakarta nobility performed these dances outside the Kraton (Royal Palace) of Solo.

In 1985 the Tong Tong Fair also organised a benefit to help rebuild the Kraton of Solo, that was damaged by a fire. In 2006 the Tong Tong Fair organised a benefit to help Indonesian victims of the 2004 Tsunami.

On the 14th of May 2024 the companies behind the fair, Tong Tong Holding B.V. and Pasar Malam Besar B.V, shut down due to bankruptcy. Due to this, the 64th edition of the fair got canceled.

== Programme ==
=== Music and dance ===
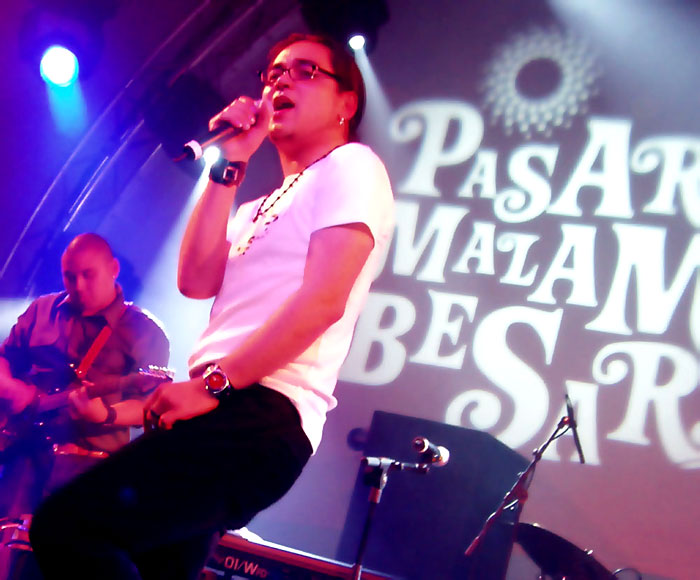
Third generation Indo artists from the Netherlands perform at, then, the Pasar Malam Besar, 2006.

Two specific forms of Indo music usually take center stage. Kroncong (Dutch: Krontjong, Indonesian: Keroncong) which is an age old music form, with roots in Portuguese Fado music, that developed in Indo communities around Batavia (now Jakarta). Classic Kroncong orchestras can still be found in both the Netherlands and Indonesia. The other typical music form is called Indorock. It combines flamboyant showmanship and musical virtuoso, based on the American Rock and Roll idiom and has been played by Indo bands ever since the early fifties. With the participation of 3rd and 4th generation Indos, also DJ’s, Hiphoppers and urban live bands are taking their brand of Indo music to the stage at the 'Tong Tong Fair' / ‘Pasar Malam Besar’.

=== Food and beverage ===
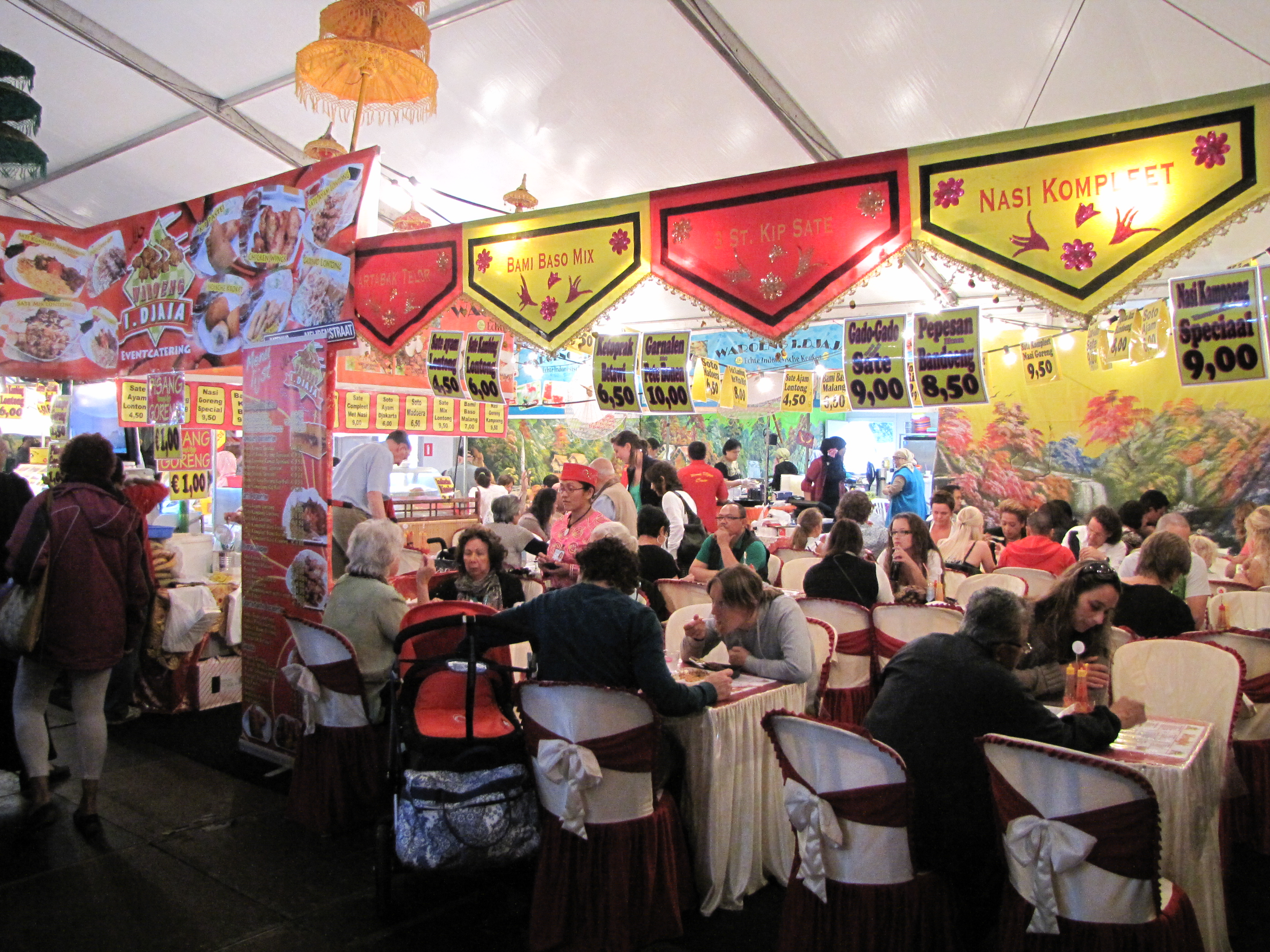
Indonesian food in the Eetwijk

The multi faceted Indo cuisine (Dutch: Indische keuken, Indonesian: masakan Indo) is considered one of the first fusion kitchens in the world and is heavily based on the kitchens of many different Indonesian areas. The classic Rijsttafel (a Dutch word meaning `Rice-table’) is a prime example of a Eurasian culinary concept that was not prevalent in pre-colonial Indonesia. The food courts present a wide range of traditional Indonesian and Asian dishes. The culinary theatre allows visitors to share and discuss recipes and make and taste dishes. The market stalls sell fresh Asian fruit such as durian or manggis and snacks such as martabak or pisang goreng. The abundance of food on offer attracts many visitors.

=== Merchandise and culture ===
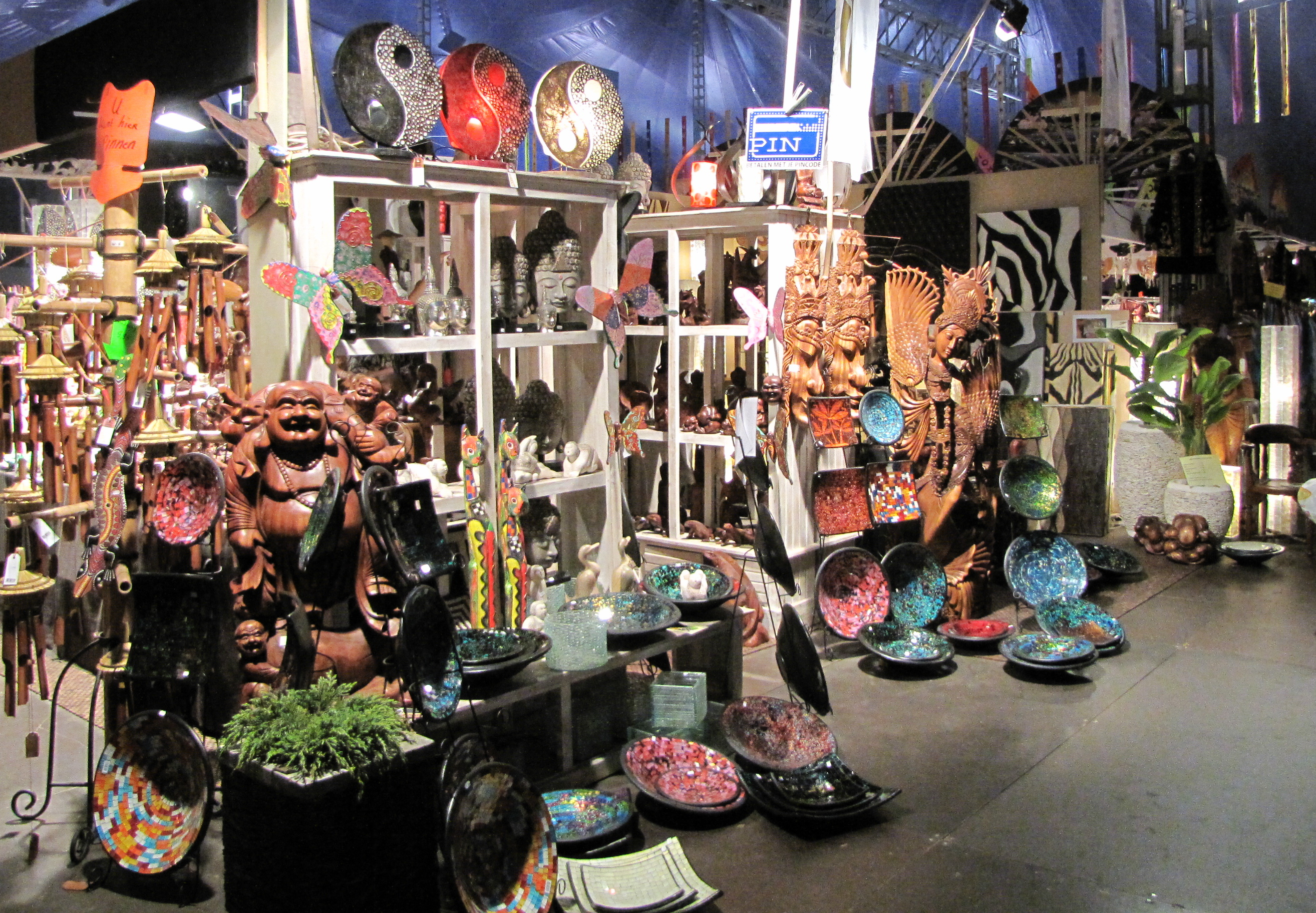
Stand with Indonesian kitsch and culture

A large section of the ‘Tong Tong Fair’ is reserved for amongst others Indonesian businesses selling their merchandise which includes antiques, Yogya or Bali silver, furniture, batiks, wood carvings and much more. ‘Tong Tong Fair’ also offers workshops and master classes in the arts and lecture on amongst others literature, architecture and cultural research. Notable also are the comprehensive cultural delegations from specific areas in Indonesia that are invited to participate.

== Awards ==
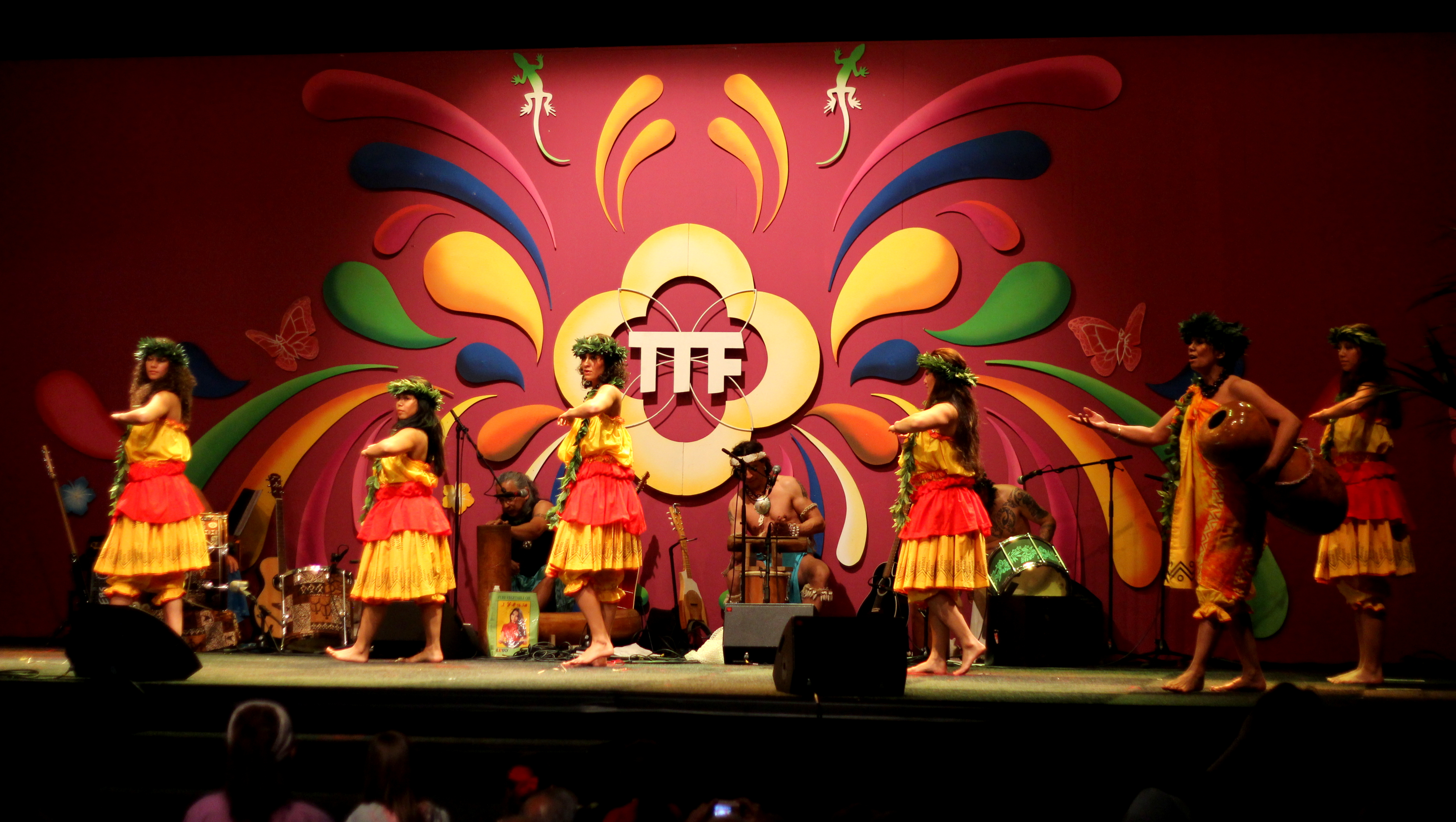
Dance group in 2014

The Tong Tong Fair, at that time still known as the Pasar Malam Besar, won the Promotion Award of The Hague in December 2006 in the category Tourism and Economy. This was followed in June 2007 by the prestigious Grand Prix of the National Events Awards (the ‘Oscars’ of the Dutch events industry). The Grand Prix is only awarded to events, which in terms of size, standing and allure, have become a real phenomenon. In 2008 the Tong Tong Foundation received the highest award of the city of the Hague (The Stadspenning by the municipality of The Hague).

== Challenges ==
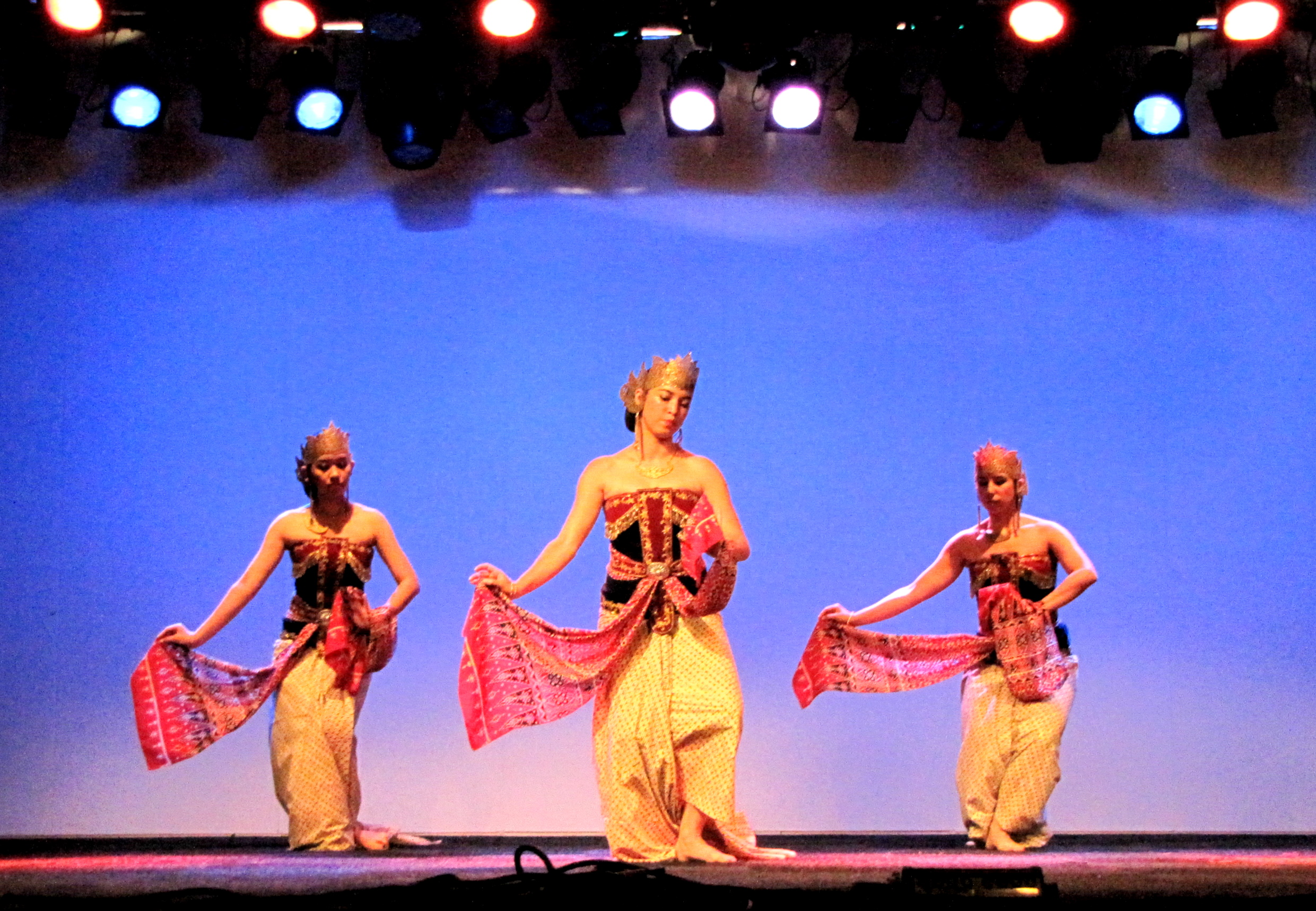
Dance group Kurung Kurung from Leiden

Notwithstanding the large number of visitors, a challenge facing the festival was formulating a clear vision for the future and a strategy for achieving its cultural mission. As a high-profile exhibition of Indo culture, it needed to transform beyond an event of nostalgia for the Dutch East Indies towards an event that reflected contemporary Indo identity and culture. Other challenges concerned its potential online and multi-lingual role in social media, as well as its ability to professionally register the many cultural activities and performances hosted.

== Legacy ==
The Tong Tong Fair left a lasting legacy as the Netherlands’ most prominent meeting place for Indo-European and Indonesian culture, bringing generations together through food, music, literature, history and shared memories. Its disappearance did not end the pasar tradition: established events around the country expanded, while The Hague developed the new Jalan Jalan Festival. Following the 2025 pre-launch Jalan Pedis, Jalan Jalan will debut as a three-day citywide festival August 2026, presenting Indo culture in a contemporary form across multiple locations in The Hague.
