= Gesang Martohartono =

Javanese (Indonesian) singer-songwriter (1917–2010)

Gesang
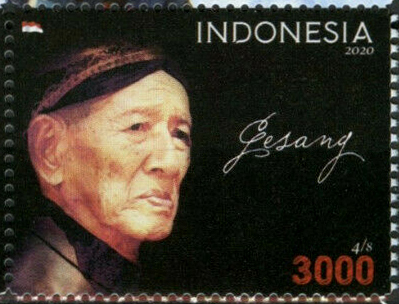
- Martohartono on a 2020 stamp of Indonesia
- Born: Gesang Martohartono; 1 October 1917; Surakarta, Java
- Died: 20 May 2010 (aged 92); Surakarta, Java
- Resting place: Pracimoloyo Cemetery, Central Java
- Occupations: Singer–songwriter, musician

Gesang Martohartono (1 October 1917 – 20 May 2010) was a Javanese singer-songwriter from Surakarta, Central Java. He is the composer of the "Bengawan Solo" – a famous song throughout Indonesia, Japan, part of Asia, and some other countries. The song is almost synonymous with the kroncong style of Javanese music. Martohartono was most commonly known simply as Gesang.

Gesang was born in Surakarta (Solo), Indonesia. His father owned a batik-fabric business, which went bankrupt when Gesang was in his teens, plunging the family into poverty. Gesang, a self-taught musician who was illiterate in musical notation, supported himself and his family by writing songs and singing at local functions such as weddings and other formal occasions.

== Career ==
In 1940, just before the Japanese occupation of the Dutch East Indies in World War II, the impoverished 23-year-old musician composed a tune (using a flute) in the popular urban local style known as kroncong, a musical tradition of the region which combined Javanese chord progressions with Westernised vocal stylings, instrumental arrangements, and melodies. The style had its origins in the 17th century Portuguese influence upon the region.

For the lyrics, Gesang turned to Surakarta's river for inspiration. The Bengawan Solo River is Java's longest and most important waterway for trade and agriculture. It seemed to Gesang to symbolise the durability of Javanese culture in those troubled times. Gesang himself would later remark "I had dreamt since my childhood about writing a song of praise for the immortal Solo River."

Gesang added "Bengawan Solo" to his repertoire, and it soon became widely popular among the local Javanese community. The song rose to national prominence when recordings of it were aired on local radio stations. It also found an appreciative audience among the Japanese occupation forces, some of whom took to singing it with lyrics translated into Japanese. It was popular among the non-Javanese prisoners (principally Dutch civilians) of the Japanese internment camps, many of whom spoke Indonesian. The simple, nostalgic lyrics and popular-sounding melody held equal appeal to the long-standing resident and the homesick soldier.

As World War II drew to a close, the returning soldiers of the Japanese Imperial Army brought the song back to Japan. In the dark period immediately after Japan's defeat, "Bengawan Solo" caught the public mood. Its fame soon spread throughout the country after best-selling recordings were released by popular singers, starting with Toshi Matsuda's 1947 rendition. It was periodically re-released by popular artists, and the song soon became almost synonymous in Japan with Indonesian music, with many assuming that it was a centuries-old traditional song.

Versions of "Bengawan Solo" were released in other Asian countries. It has since been reinterpreted many times by musical artists worldwide.

Gesang remained in the city of his birth, continuing to compose and sing. He came to be regarded as a leading exponent of the Solonese kroncong style.

In 1991, a group of appreciative Japanese war veterans arranged for a life-size statue of Gesang to be erected in a Surakarta park, to mark their respects for the composer of the tune that had managed to cross the cultural barriers of wartime.

== Death ==
From 12 May 2010 Gesang was hospitalized in a state of ill health. He was reported to be unconscious and was sent to Muhammadiyah Hospital's Intensive Care Unit in his hometown of Solo. He was falsely reported dead on 18 May 2010. By complications of his lung infection, Gesang died 2 days later in the hospital, on 20 May 2010 at the age of 92.
