= Genjer-genjer =

Osing folk song

"Genjer-Genjer"

Song
- Language: Osing
- Published: c. 1942 or 1953
- Genre: Folk
- Lyricist: Muhammad Arief

Tied sawah lettuces being sold for cooking, mentioned in the second verse of Genjer-Genjer

Genjer-Genjer (Old Spelling: Gendjer-Gendjer, Carakan: ꦒꦺꦚ꧀ꦗꦺꦂꧏ; lit. 'Sawah lettuces') is an Osing language folk song from East Java, Indonesia, written by musician Muhammad Arief. The song is about sawah lettuces, a plant often found in rice fields, and how it's sold and cooked as a side dish with rice and sambal.

Originally written to criticise the Japanese occupation and to ease and shine light on the hardships of the Banyuwangi people, the song gained popularity nationwide in Indonesia before it was outlawed during the reign of the New Order due to its ties to the Communist Party of Indonesia (PKI).

In modern times, Genjer-Genjer is still stigmatised due to its ties with the PKI and is often associated with communism, though there has been efforts by the Banyuwangi people to rectify the song as cultural heritage and symbol of resistance and perseverance.

== Description ==
Genjer-Genjer tells the story of sawah lettuces and how the locals interact with it, where it was harvested in small batches to be sold at markets, tied and displayed in rows, and bought to be boiled and served half-cooked with rice and sambal. Genjer-Genjer was originally played with angklung Caruk, as it was the instrument Arief was familiar with, though was later adapted to traditional Osing ensembles to accompany gandrung performances. The melody of Genjer-Genjer is believed to have been taken from Tong Alak Getak, a traditional Javanese children's song.

A traditional dance of the same name based on the song was first created in 1956 and perfected in 1962 by Slamet Menur, a fellow Banyuwangi artisan and close associate of Arief.

Though most renditions of the song stayed true to the original lyrics, there has been many small variations in lyrics, such as replacing Osing words with standard Javanese equivalents or completely cutting off the third verse of the song. The original third verse of the song, written by Menur, are as follows:

Third Verse
Translation
Original [Sic]
Standardised
Carakan

Genjer-genjer mlebu pendil wedang gemulak
Genjer-genjer mlebu pendil wedang gemulak
Setengah mateng dientas wong dienggo iwak
Setengah mateng dientas wong dienggo iwak
Sego ring piring sambel jeruk ring pelonco
Genjer-genjer dipangan musuhe sego

Génjér-génjér mlebu kendhil wedang gemulak
Génjér-génjér mlebu kendhil wedang gemulak
Setengah mateng dientas wong dienggo iwak
Setengah mateng dientas wong dienggo iwak
Sega ring piring sambel jeruk ring pelanca
Génjér-génjér dipangan musuhé sega

ꦒꦺꦚ꧀ꦗꦺꦂꦒꦺꦚ꧀ꦗꦺꦂꦩ꧀ꦭꦼꦧꦸꦏꦼꦤ꧀ꦝꦶꦭ꧀ꦮꦺꦢꦁꦒꦼꦩꦸꦭꦏ꧀꧈
ꦒꦺꦚ꧀ꦗꦺꦂꦒꦺꦚ꧀ꦗꦺꦂꦩ꧀ꦭꦼꦧꦸꦏꦼꦤ꧀ꦝꦶꦭ꧀ꦮꦺꦢꦁꦒꦼꦩꦸꦭꦏ꧀꧈
ꦱꦼꦠꦼꦔꦃꦩꦠꦼꦁꦢꦶꦲꦼꦤ꧀ꦠꦱ꧀ꦮꦺꦴꦁꦢꦶꦲꦼꦁꦒꦺꦴꦲꦶꦮꦏ꧀꧈
ꦱꦼꦠꦼꦔꦃꦩꦠꦼꦁꦢꦶꦲꦼꦤ꧀ꦠꦱ꧀ꦮꦺꦴꦁꦢꦶꦲꦼꦁꦒꦺꦴꦲꦶꦮꦏ꧀꧈
ꦱꦼꦒꦫꦶꦁꦥꦶꦫꦶꦁꦱꦩ꧀ꦧꦼꦭ꧀ꦗꦼꦫꦸꦏ꧀ꦫꦶꦁꦥꦼꦭꦚ꧀ꦕ꧈
ꦒꦺꦚ꧀ꦗꦺꦂꦒꦺꦚ꧀ꦗꦺꦂꦢꦶꦥꦔꦤ꧀ꦩꦸꦱꦸꦃꦲꦺꦱꦼꦒ꧉

Sawah lettuces are placed in a pot of boiling water
Sawah lettuces are placed in a pot of boiling water
Half-cooked, it's then strained to be eaten as a side dish
Half-cooked, it's then strained to be eaten as a side dish
On a plate with rice and nasnaran, sitting on a divan
The sawah lettuce is eaten with rice

== History ==
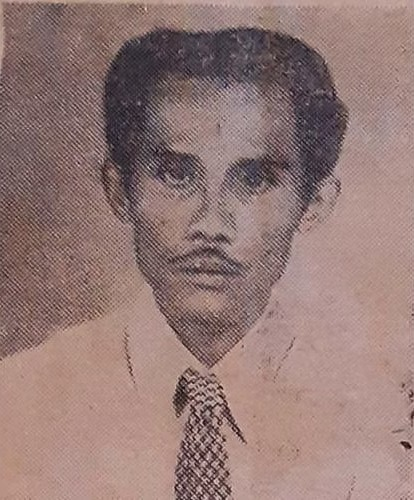
Muhammad Arief, the author of Genjer-Genjer.

=== Background ===
Muhammad Arief, an Osing musician and songwriter, was told by his wife, Suyekti, that in her native region of Central Java, people often eat sawah lettuces as a side dish, he didn't believe her at first, as sawah lettuces were known to be a wild plant often used as livestock feed such as ducks in his region, and only after his wife cooked him a plate of sawah lettuce with rice and sambal did he believe her.

In March 1942, Banyuwangi fell under Japanese occupation and was placed under the control of the 16th Army. During the occupation, crops such as rice were seized from the civilians for the war effort, which led to widespread malnutrition and famine. During the famine, the Banyuwangi people were encouraged to eat alternate foods such as cassava, corn, sweet potatoes, and snails, with some resorting to eating banana tree stumps, papaya leaves, and cassava leaves. Sawah lettuces were eaten by the Banyuwangi people as an alternative, where it was often served with corn and sambal.

=== Creation ===
The exact reasoning and year of creation behind Genjer-Genjer's creation differs between sources and is a subject of debate.

According to Slamet Menur, Muhammad Arief, inspired by the sawah lettuce dish his wife cooked him and the suffering of his people, wrote Genjer-Genjer in 1942 to ease the hunger endured by the Banyuwangi people by telling them that sawah lettuces are edible. Others such as Hasnan Singodimayan, who's also familiar with Arief, said that he was inspired by the consumption of sawah lettuces by his people in desperation. Parlindungan additionally suggests that the song was created as a criticism against the occupying Japanese forces.

Though frequently cited by various sources as the year of creation, the year 1942 has been contested by historian Ridwan Saidi, who claims that the song only came to prominence in 1963, and due to the oppressive nature of the Japanese occupation and the "absence of the song during the 1955 election", the song couldn't have been well-known by the public until then, though many Osing songs have been used prominently for political purposes due to its revolutionary and heroic themes in the 50s.

Another popular year of creation is 1953, first mentioned in a local Javanese language newspaper "Mekar Sari" released in September 1965. Menur believed that the song was created in 1942, before being re-released in 1953.

=== Early reception ===
In its early years, Genjer-Genjer's popularity stayed within Banyuwangi and the Osing people, as it resonated with them through its depiction of the poverty and suffering at the time.

In 1962, Lukman Njoto, founder of Lekra and member of PKI, heard the song as he was passing through Banyuwangi in his journey to Bali, which caught his attention. During this time, Srimuda (Indonesian: Seni Rakyat Indonesia Muda, lit. 'Indonesian Youth Folk Art'), founded by Arief, often accompany PKI political events, with Genjer-Genjer being used frequently due to the lyrics fitting with PKI's political agenda.

Genjer-Genjer gained further popularity throughout Indonesia through its continuous use by the Communist Party of Indonesia (PKI), which peaked in 1963 through intensive playtime on television through TVRI and radio through RRI. Well-known musicians also came to record Genjer-Genjer such as Bing Slamet and Lilis Suryani. During its popularity, several members from Central Java claims Genjer-Genjer was created by Ki Nartosabdo, a renowned artisan and dalang from Klaten.

=== Censorship and social stigma ===
In 1965, Genjer-Genjer became entangled in the New Order’s mythology of the 30 September Movement, an abortive supposed left-wing coup that took place on 1 October 1965, that Suharto used as a pretext to launch a counter-coup and bring his own authoritarian government to power. Due to its prevalent usage by the PKI, the song has been strongly associated with the party and left-wing politics in general, which made the song a target by anti-communist supporters of the New Order. On one notable instance, the song was parodied by a newspaper associated founded by the Indonesian Students' Action Union, replacing the lyrics with a retelling of the events of the movement.

Jenderal-jenderal nyang ibu kota pating keleler
Emake Gerwani teko-teko nyuliki jenderal
Oleh sak truk, mungkir sedot sing toleh-toleh
Jenderal-jenderal saiki wes dicekeli

Jenderal-jenderal isuk-isuk pada disiksa
Dijejer ditaleni dan dipelosoro
Emake Gerwani teko kabeh milu ngersoyo
Jenderal-jenderal maju terus dipateni

Generals spread throughout the capital city
Mother Gerwani arrives to kidnap the generals
Capturing a truckful of them and left without looking
The generals have now been captured

In the morning, the generals are tortured
They're lined up, tied up, and beaten up
Mother Gerwani have all gathered to beat them up
The generals moved forward and was later killed

The scenes of conspirators singing and dancing to Genjer-Genjer depicted in the film Pengkhianatan G30S/PKI.

In order to further bolster its own legitimacy and further discredit the Indonesian Left, the New Order fabricated a story about how during the killings members of the PKI youth (People's Youth) and women (Gerwani) organizations danced and took part in orgies as they mutilated the generals while singing songs, including Genjer-Genjer. The only evidence that the New Order presented for the song's use during the killings is unreliable and fabricated, however, stemming from confessions extracted through torture and a book of Indonesian folk songs that included lyrics for Genjer-Genjer found left behind at Halim Airforce Base (the coup headquarters). A piece of paper containing the lyrics to the song found near the site was used as strong evidence of PKI's involvement of the movement by press tied to the New Order, though the lyrics written didn't match with the original.

During the New Order's reign, Genjer-Genjer was barred from public performance and whoever sings it in public was apprehended and labelled as a communist. They deemed the song to be treacherous, believing that it contains hints of the planned rebellion. In the wider public, Genjer-Genjer has largely become taboo to sing and the song fell out of popularity.

On 1 April 1968, during a visit to Cambodia, the Indonesian presidential delegation was welcomed by thousands of Cambodians, with songs such as "Bengawan Solo" and "Maju Tak Gentar" being played. The final song to be performed was Genjer-Genjer, which caught the delegation by surprise, including President Soeharto. Boediardjo, the Indonesian ambassador to Cambodia at the time, apologised to Soeharto for the inclusion of that song.

In 1984, a film titled Pengkhianatan G30S/PKI was released, featuring scenes based on the fabricated story of conspirators singing and dancing to Genjer-Genjer during the torturing of generals, described as a set up to an orgy-like atmosphere through the dance and singing of the folk song by the conspirators and sympathisers while ostensibly enjoying themselves. The melody of Genjer-Genjer is used in the movie as a sinister musical theme, signaling an atmosphere of disorder and cruelty. The usage of Genjer-Genjer in the film, which was made mandatory in schools and aired annually, further cemented the song with PKI and the 30th September Movement in the public consciousness, where it was tied to scenes of torture and horror.

=== Aftermath ===
Since 1998, there has been efforts to vindicate Genjer-Genjer away from its ties to the movement by returning it back to its cultural roots, though the stigma that became engraved into the collective consciousness within the wider Indonesian populace has yet to fully dissipate. The usage of the folk song has been mixed in modern times, while several Banyuwangi musicians have referenced or covered the song to reclaim it as a cultural heritage of the Osing people, outside of the region, the song has been used in tandem with depictions of the PKI and the 30 September Movement as a melodic shorthand.

In 2005, the film Gie used Bing Slamet's rendition of the song during a scene of a PKI campaign, which led to a mass protest by a dozen Islamic members in front of the local Solo Radio station after playing the song as a part of Gie's soundtrack on 14 September 2009. The protesters deemed the airing of the song revitalises the spirit of communism and exposing the public of past trauma and demanded for the radio to apologise.

On December 2009, the same rendition of the song by Bing Slamet was ranked 105 in Rolling Stone's 150 Greatest Indonesian Songs of All Time (Indonesian: 150 Lagu Terbaik Indonesia Sepanjang Masa).

== Renditions ==
Gendjer-Gendjer
The rendition of the three verses of Genjer-Genjer by the Regional Arts Family Studio of Surabaya, East Java.

The earliest known rendition of the song dates back to 15 March 1965 by the Regional Arts Family Studio of Surabaya, East Java, led by Tjak Abu and recorded by Lokananta Records. The rendition is played in an East Java gamelan style with slightly Javanised lyrics. The most well-known renditions of the song are those made by Bing Slamet as a part of the collaborative album "Mari Bersuka Ria dengan Irama Lenso" (lit. 'Let's Rejoice to the Melody of Lenso') and Lilis Suryani as a part of her album "...ia tetap di atas!" (lit. '...She's Still On Top!').

- In 2006, Banyuwangi singer Catur Arum referenced the first melody of Genjer-Genjer in his song "Genjer".
- In 2011, Banyuwangi band OmpRock recorded a version of Genjer-Genjer, which includes the third verse.
- Gendjer2 by Nova Ruth & Grey Filastine, 2012. It was reviewed on NPR, including an interview with the artists discussing the song's political context.
- In 2014, Indonesian singer and songwriter Ahmad Dhani created Ojo Kuwi, a campaign song for Prabowo-Hatta during the 2014 presidential election, the melody of the song is reminiscent of Genjer-Genjer, which got him into notable controversy.
- In 2016, The American rock band Dengue Fever recorded a version of Genjer-genjer with lyrics in Khmer.
- In 2017, Indonesian singer and songwriter Iwan Fals was accused of using the melody of Genjer-Genjer as the reff for his 1987 song Surat Buat Wakil Rakyat (Letter for People's Representatives), though no clarification has come out.

== See also ==
- List of Indonesian folk songs

== Bibliography ==
- Arps, Bernard (2011). "The Lettuce Song and Its Trajectory: The Vagaries of a Pop Song in Three Eras". Festival Kesenian Indonesia VII: 28–42.
- Parlindungan, Utan (2014). "Mitos Genjer-Genjer: Politik Makna dalam Lagu". Jurnal Ilmu Sosial dan Ilmu Politik. 17 (3): 236–253. ISSN 1410-4946.
- Subarkah, Muhammad (2022). "Transformasi Komunikasi Lagu Genjer-Genjer dari Lagu Populer ke Politik". Perspektif: 290–304. ISSN 2807-1190.
