= Panon Hideung =

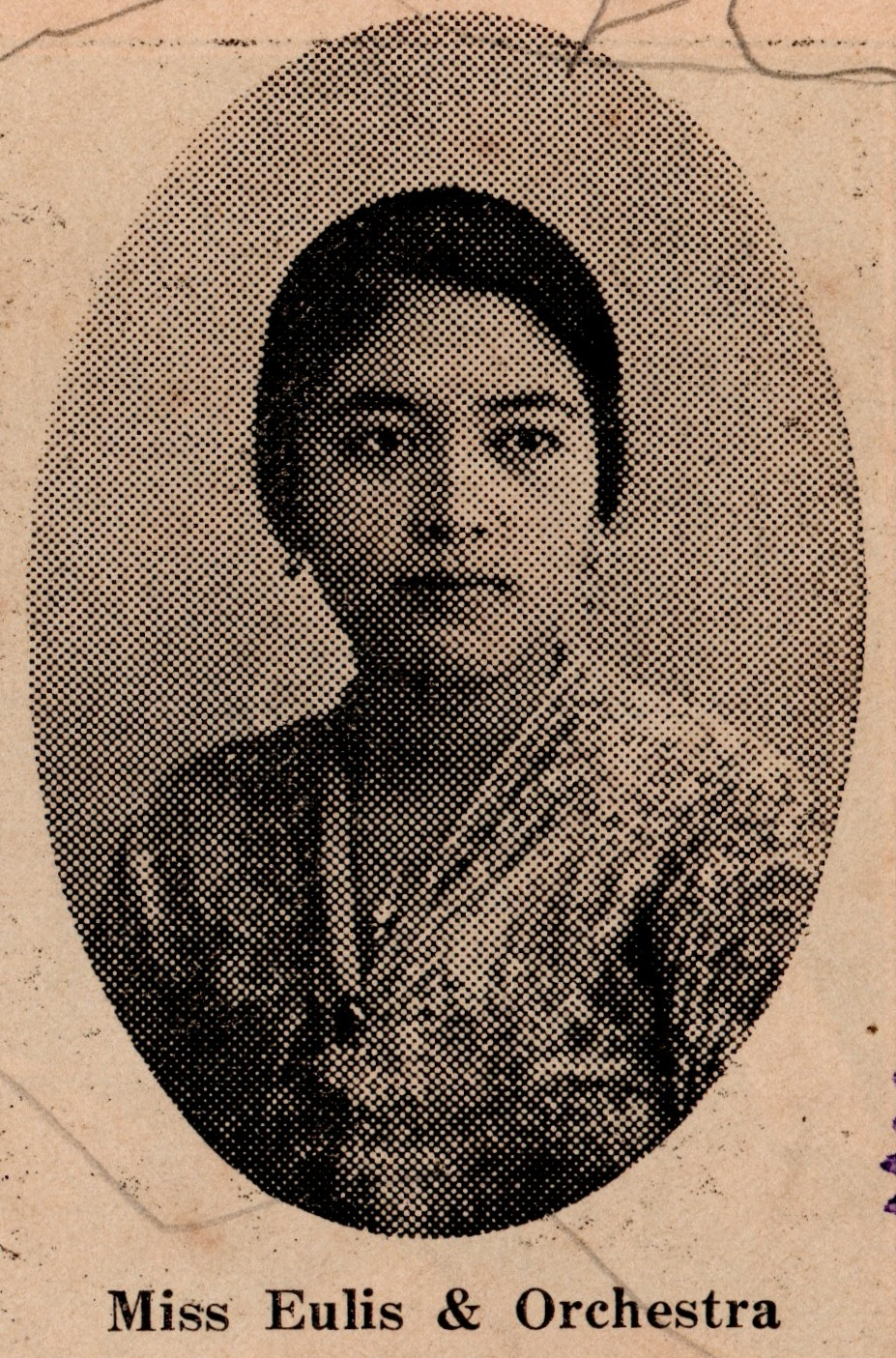
A portrait of Miss Eulis (1930), the main inspiration for Panon Hideung

Panon Hideung (Sundanese: ᮕᮔᮧᮔ᮪ ᮠᮤᮓᮩᮀ, lit. 'Black Eyes') is a popular Sundanese folk song. Written by Ismail Marzuki in between 1936-1937, Panon Hideung is the Sundanese adaptation of a well-known Russian romance, "Ochi Chornye" (Russian: Очи чёрные, lit. 'Dark Eyes'). The song's lyrics tells of a guy who's in love with a beautiful girl from Bandung.

== Origin ==
Marzuki with his orchestra were requested to fill in radio programmes on Western songs in Bandung, he studied many Western and traditional songs. During that time, he translated many Western songs, including Russian Ochi Chornye with the help of Zarkov, a Soviet artisan who lived in Bandung.

Panon Hideung was also inspired by Miss Eulis, a Sundanese kroncong singer and radio star of Arab descent. While translating, Marzuki fell in love with Miss Eulis, in the song, he described her in the song as having black eyes, yellow-ish cheeks, and sharped nose.

== Renditions ==
The first known rendition of Panon Hideung is by Mus Ds, accompanied by Orkes Teruna Ria under Oslan Husein from 1958. In this rendition, Mus Ds added extra lyrics with a poem reading in-between verses.

In the 60's, Bing Slamet made a cover of Panon Hideung. In this rendition, he altered the second line of the second verse, instead saying "badan abdi sararedih" (lit. 'my body saddens deeply').

== Lyrics ==
=== Original Lyrics by Ismail Marzuki ===
Sundanese

Panon hideung, irung mancung
Pipi konéng, putri Bandung
Putri saha, di mana bumina?
Abdi resep ka anjeunna

Siang-wengi kaimpi-impi
Haté abdi sararedih
Teu émut dahar, teu émut nginum
Émut ka nu geulis, panon hideung

In Sundanese Script

ᮕᮔᮧᮔ᮪ ᮠᮤᮓᮩᮀ, ᮄᮛᮥᮀ ᮙᮔ᮪ᮎᮥᮀ
ᮕᮤᮕᮤ ᮊᮧᮔᮦᮀ, ᮕᮥᮒᮢᮤ ᮘᮔ᮪ᮓᮥᮀ
ᮕᮥᮒᮢᮤ ᮞᮠ, ᮓᮤ ᮙᮔ ᮘᮥᮙᮤᮔ?
ᮃᮘ᮪ᮓᮤ ᮛᮨᮞᮨᮕ᮪ ᮊ ᮃᮔ᮪ᮏᮩᮔ᮪ᮔ

ᮞᮤᮃᮀ-ᮝᮨᮍᮤ ᮊᮄᮙ᮪ᮕᮤ-ᮄᮙ᮪ᮕᮤ
ᮠᮒᮦ ᮃᮘ᮪ᮓᮤ ᮞᮛᮛᮨᮓᮤᮂ
ᮒᮩ ᮆᮙᮥᮒ᮪ ᮓᮠᮁ, ᮒᮩ ᮆᮙᮥᮒ᮪ ᮍᮤᮔᮥᮙ᮪
ᮆᮙᮥᮒ᮪ ᮊ ᮔᮥ ᮌᮩᮜᮤᮞ᮪, ᮕᮔᮧᮔ᮪ ᮠᮤᮓᮩᮀ

Translation

Black eyes, sharp nose
Yellow cheeks, a Bandungese girl
Whose daughter is she? Where does she live?
I have feelings for her

Day and night, I dreamt of her
My heart saddens deeply
Forgetting to eat, forgetting to drink
Because I'm thinking of her, the one with black eyes

=== Version by Mus D.S ===
Lyrics
Sundanese
In Sundanese Script
Translation

Panon hideung, irung mancung
Pipi konéng, euis Bandung
Putri saha, di mana bumina?
Abdi téh rindu ka anjeunna

Panon hideung, sok ngangé krudung
Anu amis budi, euis Bandung
Putri saha, saha namina?
Siang-wengi kaimpi-impi

ᮕᮔᮧᮔ᮪ ᮠᮤᮓᮩᮀ, ᮄᮛᮥᮀ ᮙᮔ᮪ᮎᮥᮀ
ᮕᮤᮕᮤ ᮊᮧᮔᮦᮀ, ᮉᮄᮞ᮪ ᮘᮔ᮪ᮓᮥᮀ
ᮕᮥᮒᮢᮤ ᮞᮠ, ᮓᮤ ᮙᮔ ᮘᮥᮙᮤᮔ?
ᮃᮘ᮪ᮓᮤ ᮒᮦᮂ ᮛᮤᮔ᮪ᮓᮥ ᮊ ᮃᮔ᮪ᮏᮩᮔ᮪ᮔ

ᮕᮔᮧᮔ᮪ ᮠᮤᮓᮩᮀ, ᮞᮧᮊ᮪ ᮍᮍᮦ ᮊᮢᮥᮓᮥᮀ
ᮃᮔᮥ ᮃᮙᮤᮞ᮪ ᮘᮥᮓᮤ, ᮉᮄᮞ᮪ ᮘᮔ᮪ᮓᮥᮀ
ᮕᮥᮒᮢᮤ ᮞᮠ, ᮞᮠ ᮔᮙᮤᮔ?
ᮞᮤᮃᮀ-ᮝᮨᮍᮤ ᮊᮄᮙ᮪ᮕᮤ-ᮄᮙ᮪ᮕᮤ

Black eyes, sharp nose
Yellow cheeks, a Bandungese girl
Whose daughter is she? Where does she live?
I yearn for her

Black eyes, the one wearing a veil
The one with the sweet personality, the Bandungese girl
Whose daughter is she? What's her name?
Because day and night, I dreamt of her

Poem
Sundanese
In Sundanese Script
Translation

Kamana jalan ka Ciamis?
Ka kalér katojo bulan
Kamana milarian Néng Euis?
Eudeuh, si horéng nuju asik dadansaan

Kamana jalan ka Ciamis?
Ka kalér jalan ka Cikaso
Kamana milarian Néng Euis?
Eudeuh, si horéng nuju asik dansa Kalipso

ᮊᮙᮔ ᮏᮜᮔ᮪ ᮊ ᮎᮤᮃᮙᮤᮞ᮪?
ᮊ ᮊᮜᮦᮁ ᮊᮒᮧᮏᮧ ᮘᮥᮜᮔ᮪
ᮊᮙᮔ ᮙᮤᮜᮛᮤᮃᮔ᮪ ᮔᮦᮀ ᮉᮄᮞ᮪?
ᮉᮓᮩᮂ, ᮞᮤ ᮠᮧᮛᮦᮀ ᮔᮥᮏᮥ ᮃᮞᮤᮊ᮪ ᮓᮓᮔ᮪ᮞᮃᮔ᮪

ᮊᮙᮔ ᮏᮜᮔ᮪ ᮊ ᮎᮤᮃᮙᮤᮞ᮪?
ᮊ ᮊᮜᮦᮁ ᮏᮜᮔ᮪ ᮊ ᮎᮤᮊᮞᮧ
ᮊᮙᮔ ᮙᮤᮜᮛᮤᮃᮔ᮪ ᮔᮦᮀ ᮉᮄᮞ᮪?
ᮉᮓᮩᮂ, ᮞᮤ ᮠᮧᮛᮦᮀ ᮔᮥᮏᮥ ᮃᮞᮤᮊ᮪ ᮓᮔ᮪ᮞ ᮊᮜᮤᮕ᮪ᮞᮧ

Where to Ciamis are you heading?
To further North, passing the moon
Where must I find Miss Euis?
Alas, it turns out she's having fun dancing away

Where to Ciamis are you heading?
To further North, towards Cikaso
Where must I find Miss Euis?
Alas, it turns out she's having fun dancing to Calypso

== See also ==
- List of Indonesian folk songs
- Sundanese music
- Ismail Marzuki
- Dark Eyes (Russian song)
