= List of Indonesian folk songs =

As a diverse country with hundreds of different tribes and culture, Indonesia has many folk songs, known as regional songs in Indonesian (lagu daerah), for each province to preserve their identity and culture. Currently there are approximately 439 folk songs from all over Indonesia.

This page contains a list of Indonesian folk songs.

== Aceh ==
Bungong Jeumpa

Aceh folk songs
Song	Language	Author	Note
Aneuk Yatim	Acehnese	Rafly Kande	
Bungong Jeumpa	Acehnese	Unknown	
Bungong Seulanga	Acehnese	Unknown	
Di Babah Pinto	Acehnese	Unknown	
Dodaidi	Acehnese	Nurdin Daud	
Hikayat Prang Sabi	Acehnese	Teungku Chik Pante Kulu	
Jambo	Acehnese	Unknown	
Nyawoung	Acehnese	Di Husen	
Paroh Tulo	Acehnese	Unknown	
Saleum	Acehnese	Unknown	(Note: Saleum is derived from Arabic's salam, Saleum is an opening song to welcome visitors.)
Saleum Aneuk Nanggroe	Acehnese	Rafly Kande	
Tajak U Gle	Acehnese	Unknown	
Tanoh Lon Sayang	Acehnese	Anzib Lamnyong	
Tarek Pukat	Acehnese	Unknown	
Top Pade	Acehnese	Unknown	(Note: Also known as Beusare-Sare)
Ubat Ate	Acehnese	Rafly Kande	
Resam Berume	Gayo	Jamil Peparik	
Tawar Sedenge	Gayo	A.R. Moese	
Kutacane Pulo Jawe	Alas	Mukad Prata	
Lembah Alas	Alas	M. Arsyad, Khamijah	
Mase Membangun	Alas	Asriadi	
Zakat	Alas	Kameran	
Aceh Singkil	Singkil	Hasan Munthe, Jamin Bako	
Pulau-Pulau Banyak	Singkil	Unknown	
Ateh Bawah	Jamee	Pak Rep	
Haha Hihi	Jamee	Unknown	
Pakagho Ato	Jamee	Rafly Kande	

== North Sumatra ==
Sigulempong

North Sumatra folk songs
Song	Language	Author	Note
Dago Inang Sarge	Batak	Nahum Situmorang	(Note: The song is credited to both Nahum Situmorang and N.N., although its authorship is still uncertain.)
Rambadia	Batak	Unknown	
Sigulempong	Batak	Unknown	
Alusi Au	Angkola Batak	Nahum SItumorang	
Butet	Toba Batak	Unknown	(Note: The authorship of Butet is debated, while some sources say that it is written by Siddik Sitompul (also known as S. Dis), most historians conclude that Butet's author is N.N. or unknown)
Mumpat Taluktuk	Toba Batak	Siddik Sitompul	(Note: Mumpat Taluktuk is also known as Taradigadindang, taken from its chorus)
O Tano Batak	Toba Batak	Siddik Sitompul	
Sik Sik Sibatumanikam	Toba Batak	Unknown	
Sinanggar Tulo	Toba Batak	Tilhang Gultom	
Sing Sing So	Toba Batak	Siddik Sitompul	
Piso Surit	Karo Batak	Djaga Depari	
Pos Ni Uhur	Simalungun Batak	Lamser Girsang	
Tolu Sahundulan	Simalungun Batak	Unknown	
Tanö Niha	Nias	Faododo Zega	

== West Sumatra ==
West Sumatra folk songs
Song	Language	Author	Note
Ayam Den Lapeh	Minangkabau	Abdul Hamid	
Kampung Nan Jauh Di Mato	Minangkabau	Oslan Husein	
Sinandi Nandi	Minangkabau	Agus Nandi	
Kambanglah Bungo	Minangkabau	Sofyan Naan	
Tak Tong-Tong	Minangkabau	Unknown	
Andam Oi	Minangkabau	Syahrul Tarun Yusuf	
Dindin Badindin	Minangkabau	Tiar Ramon	
Bareh Solok	Minangkabau	Nuskan Syarief	
Dayuang Palinggam	Minangkabau	Karim Nun	(Note: While its author is written as anonymous in one of the earliest releases of the song, Syaiful Nawas said that the song was written by Minang violinist Karim Nun.)

== Riau and the Riau Islands ==
Soleram

Riau folk songs
Song	Language	Author	Note
Soleram	Malay	Muhammad Arief	(Note: The popular Indonesian version of Soleram is written by Muhammad Arief, the original song's lyricists is relatively unknown.)
Lancang Kuning	Malay	Sulaiman Sjafe'i	

The Riau Islands folk songs
Song	Language	Author	Note
Segantang Lada	Malay	Mohd Daud Kadir	
Pulau Bintan	Malay	Mohd Daud Kadir	

== South Sumatra ==
South Sumatra folk songs
Song	Language	Author	Note
Ya Saman	Palembang Malay	Kamsul A Harla	
Cut Mak Ilang	Palembang Malay	Unknown	
Dek Sangke	Malay	Samsudi Sholeh	
Gending Sriwijaya	Malay	Dahlan Muhibat	

== Jakarta ==
Kicir-Kicir

Jakarta folk songs
Song	Language	Author	Note
Kicir-Kicir	Indonesian	Unknown	
Keroncong Kemayoran	Indonesian	Unknown	
Kompor Mleduk	Betawi	Benyamin Sueb	
Serendo-Rendo	Betawi	Benyamin Sueb	
Tukang Tuak	Betawi	Benyamin Sueb	
Lampu Merah	Betawi	Benyamin Sueb	
Sang Bango	Betawi	Benyamin Sueb	
Ondel-Ondel	Betawi	Djoko Subagyo	
Si Jali-Jali	Betawi	M. Sagi	
Surilang	Betawi	Unknown	

== West Java ==
Tokecang

West Java folk songs
Song	Language	Author	Note
Bubuy Bulan	Sundanese	Benny Korda	
Cing Cangkeling	Sundanese	Benny Korda	
Bajing Luncat	Sundanese	Kosaman Djaja	
Tokecang	Sundanese	R.C Hardjosubroto	
Euleung Euy Euleung	Sundanese	Unknown	
Ayang Ayang Gung	Sundanese	Unknown	
Panon Hideung	Sundanese	Ismail Marzuki	(Note: Panon Hideung is a Sundanese adaptation of a Russian folk song, known as Ochi chyornye.)
Pileuleuyan	Sundanese	Muslihat Kertadiwirya	
Manuk Dadali	Sundanese	Sambas Mangundikarta	
Peuyeum Bandung	Sundanese	Sambas Mangundikarta	
Es Lilin	Sundanese	Mursih	
Mojang Priangan	Sundanese	Iyar Wiarsih	
Warung Pojok	Cirebonese	Abdul Ajib	
Turun Sintren	Cirebonese	Unknown	

== Central Java ==
Cublak-Cublak Suweng

Central Java folk songs
Song	Language	Author	Note
Gek Kepriye	Javanese	Era Kusuma	
Gundul Pacul	Javanese	R.C Hardjosubroto	(Note: Most sources also credit Sunan Kalijaga as the author, it may imply that the original lyrics and melody were created by Sunan Kalijaga, but was modified later by Hardjosubroto.)
Gambang Suling	Javanese	Ki Nartosabdo	
Lir-Ilir	Javanese	Sunan Kalijaga	
Pitik Tukung	Javanese	Unknown	

== Yogyakarta ==
Yogyakarta folk songs
Song	Language	Author	Note
Suwe Ora Jamu	Javanese	R.C Hardjosubroto	
Walang Kekek	Javanese	Waldjinah	

== East Java ==
Tanjung Perak

East Java folk songs
Song	Language	Author	Note
Tanjung Perak	Indonesian	Unknown	
Rek Ayo Rek	Javanese	Is Haryanto	
Genjer-Genjer	Osing	Muhammad Arief	
Umbul-Umbul Blambangan	Osing	Andang Chatib Yusuf	
Tondu' Majâng	Madurese	R. Amiruddin Tjitraprawira	
Lir Sa Alir	Madurese	Unknown	
Kerrabhân Sapè	Madurese	R. And. Djoemali	

== Bali ==
Jangi Janger

Bali folk songs
Song	Language	Author	Note
Dewi Ayu	Balinese	I Made Wayan	
Don Dap Dape	Balinese	Unknown	
Jangi Janger	Balinese	I Gede Dharna	

== Nusa Tenggara ==
East Nusa Tenggara folk songs
Song	Language	Author	Note
Desaku	Indonesian	L. Manik	
Anak Kambing Saya	Indonesian	Unknown	
Potong Bebek	Indonesian	Soerjono	
Bolelebo	Rote	Unknown	(Note: Also a song formerly used in Timor Timur province, prior to its independence.)
Gemu Famire	Sikka	Nyong Franco	

West Nusa Tenggara folk songs
Song	Language	Author	Note
Kadal Nongak	Sasak	Unknown	

=== Formerly ===
I Na Lou

East Timor folk songs
Song	Language	Author	Note
I Na Lou	Tetun	Unknown	

== West Kalimantan ==
Cik Cik Periuk

West Kalimantan folk songs
Song	Language	Author	Note
Cik Cik Periuk	Sambas Malay	Unknown	
Ae' Kapuas	Pontianak Malay	Paul Putra Frederick	
Kopi Pancong	Pontianak Malay	Hazairin Achmad	
Kote Pontianak	Pontianak Malay	Hazairin Achmad	

== Central Kalimantan ==
Central Kalimantan folk songs
Song	Language	Author	Note
Manari Manasai	Ngaju	Wolten Rudji	
Ka Danau	Ngaju	J.A. Sandan	
Mamangun Mahaga Lewu	Ngaju	Agustin Teras Narang	

== South Kalimantan ==
Ampar-Ampar Pisang

South Kalimantan folk songs
Song	Language	Author	Note
Ampar-Ampar Pisang	Banjarese	Hamiedan AC	
Paris Barantai	Banjarese	Anang Ardiansyah	

== North Sulawesi ==
Si Patokaan

North Sulawesi folk songs
Song	Language	Author	Note
Si Patokaan	Minahasan	Unknown	
O Ina Ni Keke	Minahasan	R.C Hardjosubroto	

== South Sulawesi ==
South Sulawesi folk songs
Song	Language	Author	Note
Ana' Kukang	Makassarese	Bora Dg. Ngirate	
Amma' Ciang	Makassarese	Hoe Eng Dji	
Pakarena	Makassarese	Arsyad Basir	

== Central Sulawesi ==
Central Sulawesi folk songs
Song	Language	Author	Note
Tondok Kadadingku	Toraja	Unknown	

== Maluku and North Maluku ==
Waktu Hujan Sore-Sore

Maluku folk songs
Song	Language	Author	Note
Ayo Mama	Ambonese Malay	Huang Hulian	
Buka Pintu	Ambonese Malay	Unknown	
Waktu Hujan Sore-Sore	Ambonese Malay	Unknown	
Ole Sioh	Ambonese Malay	Unknown	
Rasa Sayange	Ambonese Malay	Paulus Pea	
Burung Kakaktua	Malay	R.C Hardjosubroto	
Naik-Naik Ke Puncak Gunung	Malay	Saridjah Niung	

North Maluku folk songs
Song	Language	Author	Note
Borero	Tidore	Unknown	

== Papua ==
Yamko Rambe Yamko

Sajojo

Papua folk songs
Song	Language	Author	Note
E Mambo Simbo	Mamberamo	Unknown	
Apuse	Biak	Unknown	
Yamko Rambe Yamko	(Note: The language of Yamko Rambe Yamko has been a topic of debate, some Papuans claim that the language is not from Papua or gibberish. A Papuan musical artist from the Papuan Language Institute, Yan Petrus Tegai, claims that the language is from the region of Grime Nawa, where its a mix of three tribes languages: Gresi, Kemtuk, and Namlong.)	Unknown	

Southwest Papua folk songs
Song	Language	Author	Note
Sajojo	Moi	David Rumagesan	

== See also ==
- Music of Indonesia
- Sabilulungan

== Bibliography ==
- Ananta, Aris; Arifin, Evi Nurvidya; Hasbullah, M Sairi; Handayani, Nur Budi; Pramono, Agus (2015). Demography of Indonesia's Ethnicity. Institute of Southeast Asian Studies. ISBN 978-981-4519-87-8.
- Rangkuti, R.E (1981). Kumpulan Lagu-Lagu Daerah Dilengkapi dengan Akord [A Collection of Regional Folk Songs Compelte with its Chords] (in Indonesian). Titik Terang.
- Zon, Fadli (February 2017). Orkes Gumarang: Kisah Syaiful Nawas [Gumarang Orchestra: The Story of Syaiful Nawas] (in Indonesian). Jakarta: Fadli Zon Library. ISBN 978-602-7898-15-8.
