= Saleum =

Acehnese folk song

Saleum or Saleuem (lit. 'Greetings') is an Acehnese folk song, originating from Aceh, Indonesia.

== Description ==
"Saleuem" is used as a welcoming song, greeting guests and visitors of Aceh. The word "saleuem" (Jawoe: سلام; pronounced [salɯ(ə)m]) can be translated as "greetings" or a prayer for safety. saleuem may also refer to the Arabic phrase "As-salamu alaykum", a common Muslim greeting, which is present in the song's lyrics. The song "Saleuem" is one of the many results of Islamic influence in Acehnese culture.

"Saleuem" is thought to originate from the Samudera Pasai Sultanate, used as a tool for preaching Islam.

== Renditions ==
"Saleum"

Song by Community of Nyawöung

from the album Album Aceh: Nyawöung
- Language: Acehnese
- Genre: Traditional
- Songwriter: Unknown
- Lyricist: Mukhlis

"Saleuem" was popularised by the Community of Nyawöung, being listed as the first track in their 2000 album Album Aceh: Nyawöung. the rendition of the song was sung by Mukhlis.

=== Other notable renditions ===
- Acehnese folk singer and songwriter, Rafly Kande, sung the song as his performance at the 2014 Jakarta Melayu Festival.
- On 9th November, 2015, Budi Doremi sung the song during his concert in Banda Aceh.

== Lyrics ==
Acehnese lyrics

Salamualaikôm warahmatullah
Jaroe dua blah ateueh jeumala
Jaroe lôn siplôh di ateueh ulèe
Meu'ah lôn lakèe bak kawôm dum na
Jaroe lôn siplôh di ateueh ubôn
Salamualaikôm lôn teugôr sapa

Jaroe lôn siplôh beuôt sikureueng
Carat ulôn kheun tanda mulia
Jaroe sikureueng lôn beuôt lapan
Geulantoe timphan ngön asoe kaya
Jaroe lôn lapan lôn beuôt tujôh
Ranub lam bungkôh lôn jôk keu gata

Translation

May peace be upon you, as well as the mercy of God
As I put both of my hands above my head
My fingers, ten of them, I put them above my head
As I seek forgiveness from you all
My fingers, ten of them, on top of my head
Peace be upon you, as I give you my greetings

My fingers, ten of them, I raise nine
I lay my requisite as a sign of honor
My fingers, nine of them, I raise eight
Replace the timphan with coconut jam filling
My fingers, eight of them, I raise seven
I hand over the betel in a wrapper to you

== See also ==
- List of Indonesian folk songs
