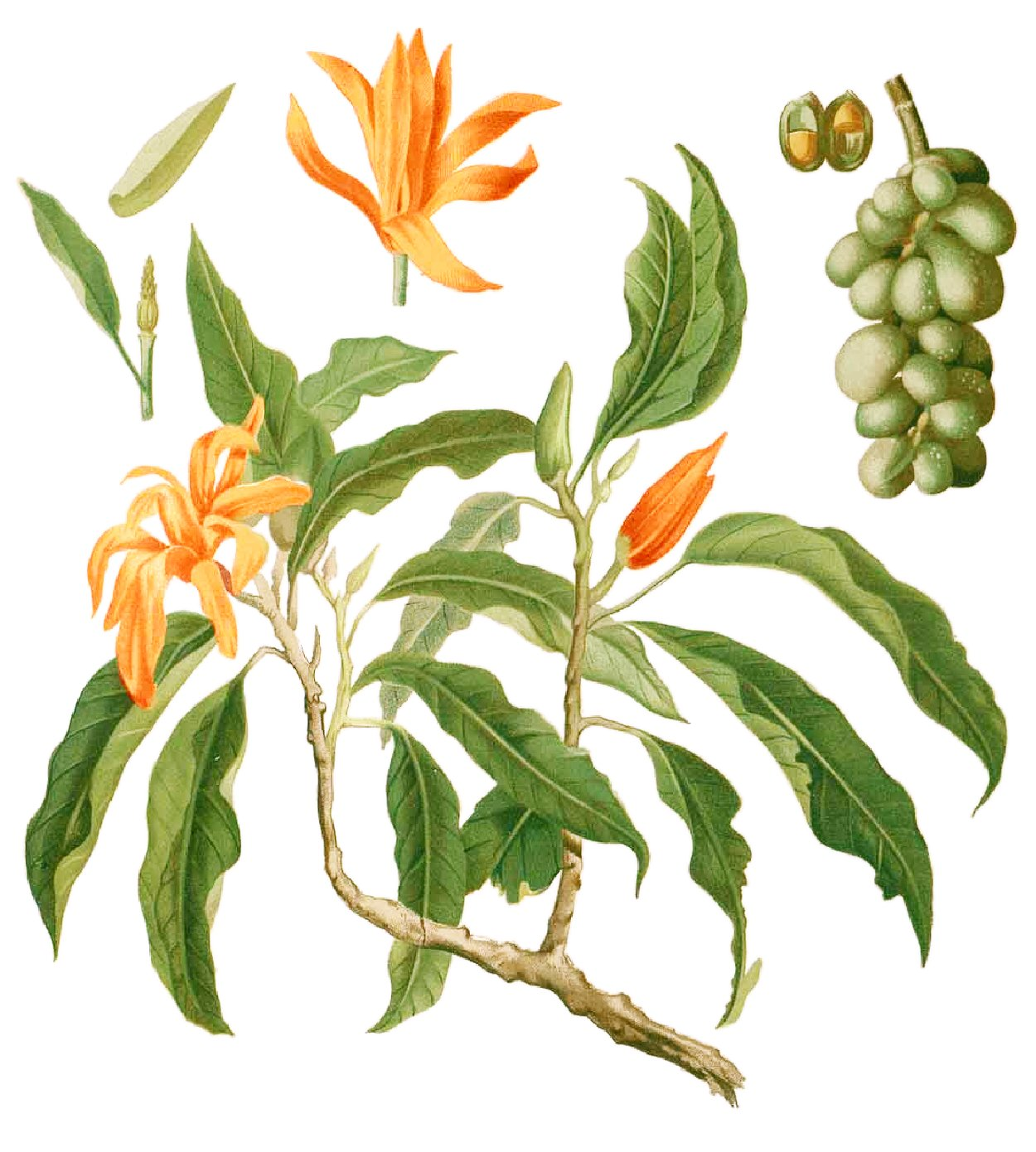

Conservation status
- Least Concern (IUCN 3.1)

Scientific classification
- Kingdom: Plantae
- Clade: Tracheophytes
- Clade: Angiosperms
- Clade: Magnoliids
- Order: Magnoliales
- Family: Magnoliaceae
- Genus: Magnolia
- Subgenus: Magnolia subg. Yulania
- Section: Magnolia sect. Michelia
- Subsection: Magnolia subsect. Michelia
- Species: M. champaca

Binomial name
- Magnolia champaca (L.) Baill. ex Pierre

Varieties
- Magnolia champaca var. champaca; Magnolia champaca var. pubinervia (Blume) Figlar & Noot.

Synonyms
- List: Champaca michelia Noronha; Magnolia membranacea P.Parm.; Michelia aurantiaca Wall.; Michelia blumei Steud.; Michelia champaca L.; Michelia euonymoides Burm.f.; Michelia rheedei Wight; Michelia rufinervis DC.; Michelia sericea Pers.; Michelia suaveolens Pers.; Sampacca euonymoides (Burm.f.) Kuntze; Sampacca suaveolens (Pers.) Kuntze

= Magnolia champaca =

Species of tree

Magnolia champaca, known in English as champak (/ˈtʃʌmpək/), is a large evergreen tree in the family Magnoliaceae. It was previously classified as Michelia champaca. It is known for its fragrant flowers, and its timber used in woodworking.

== Description ==
In its native range Magnolia champaca grows to 50 metres (160 ft) or taller. Its trunk can be up to 1.9 metres (6.2 ft) in diameter. The tree has a narrow umbelliform crown.

It has strongly fragrant flowers in varying shades of cream to yellow-orange which bloom during June to September. The obovoid-ellipsoid carpels produce 2−4 seeds during September to October.

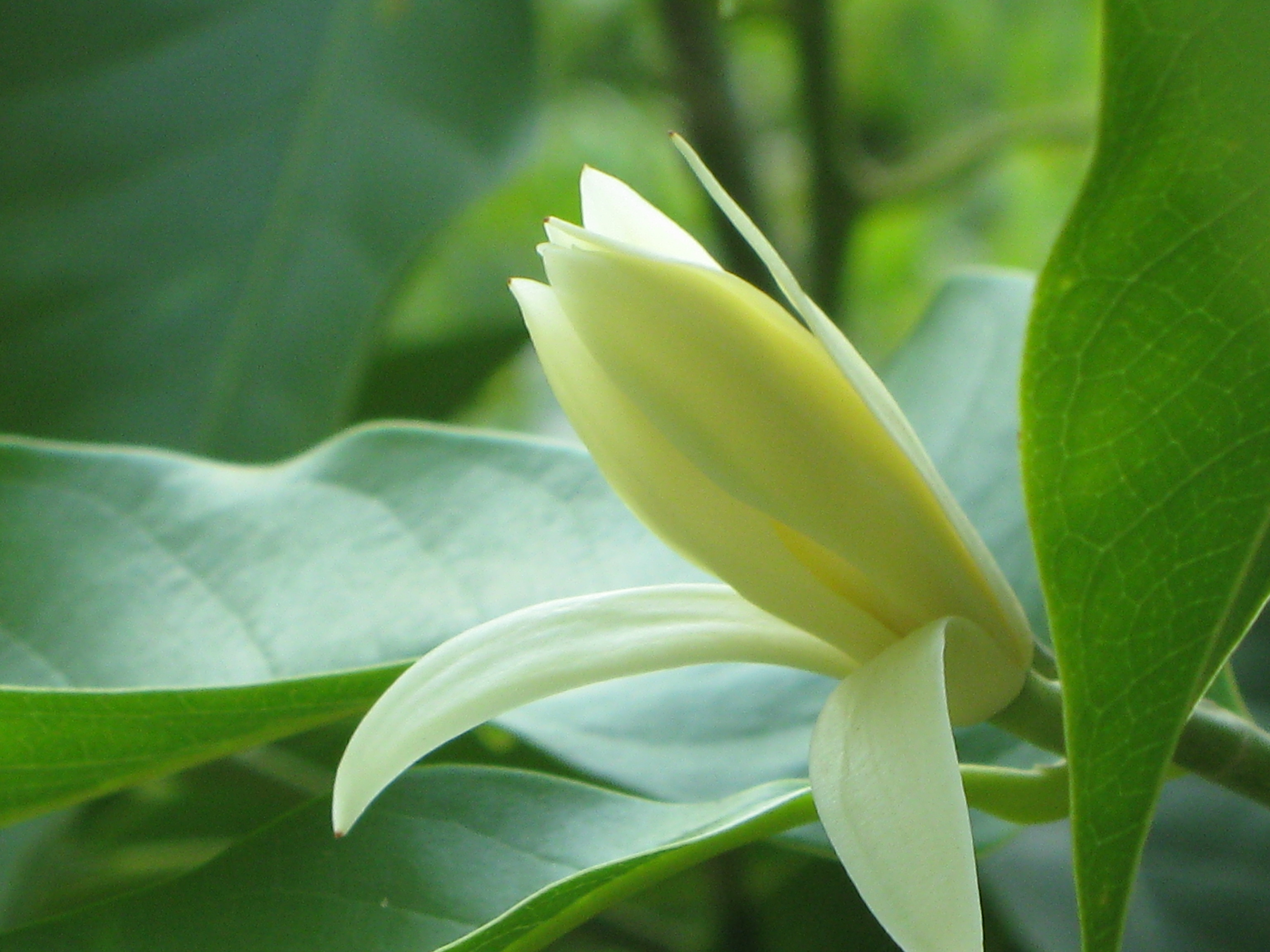
White champak flower

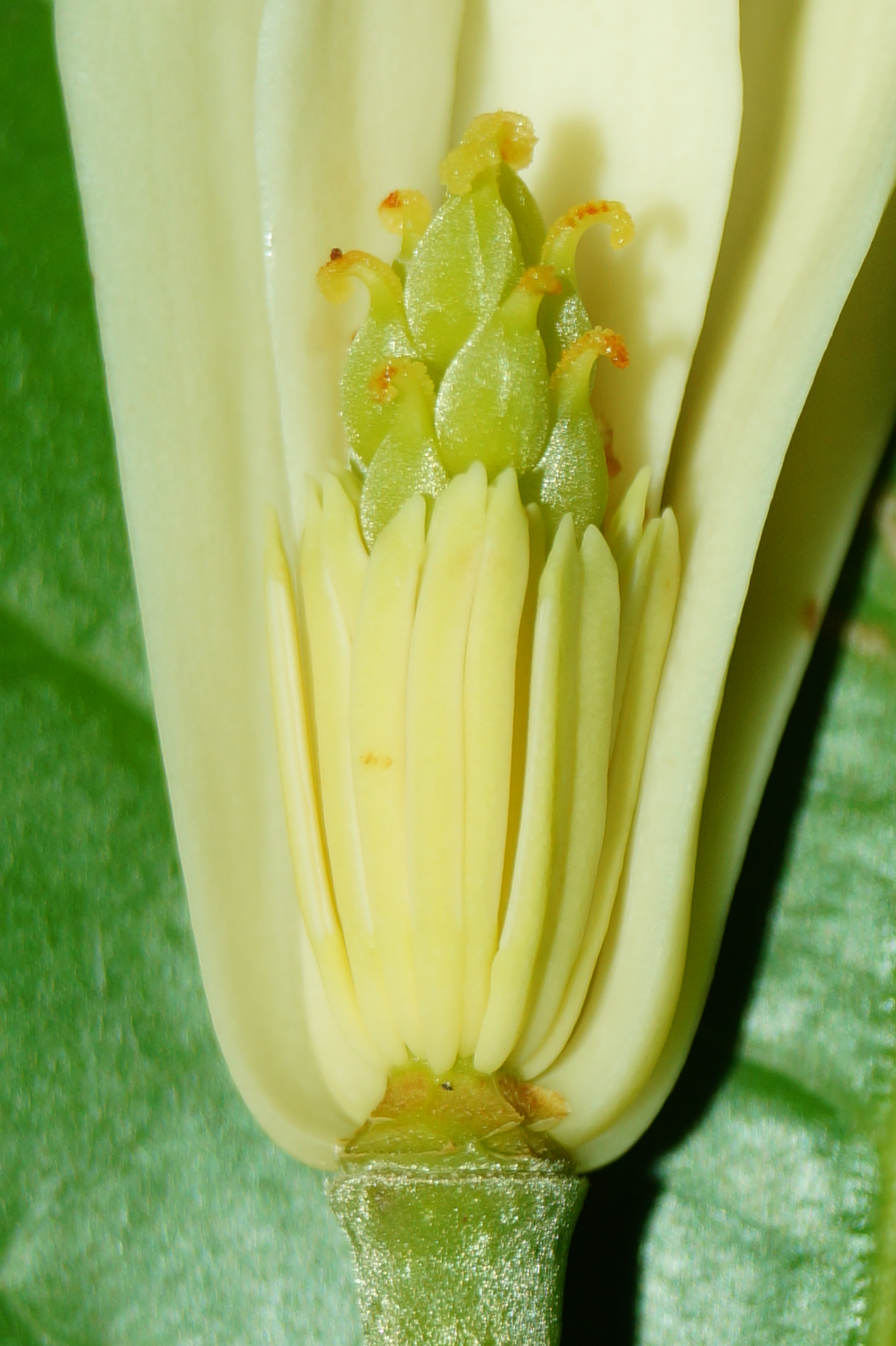
Base of champak flower

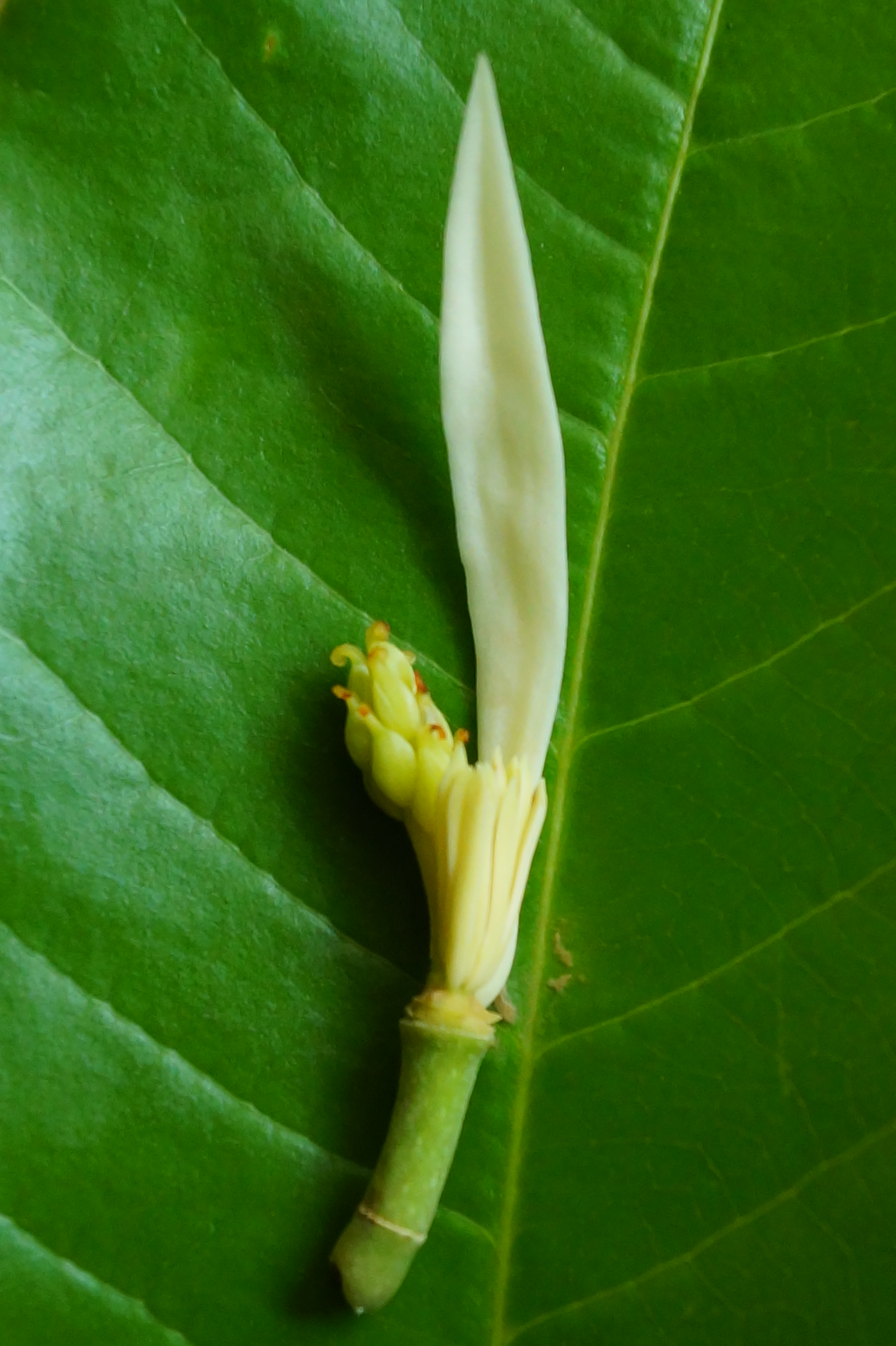
Single champak petal

== Taxonomy ==
=== Etymology ===
The species epithet, champaca, comes from the Sanskrit word campaka (चम्पक; pronounced [t͡ɕɐm.pɐ.kɐ]).

=== Varieties and hybrids ===
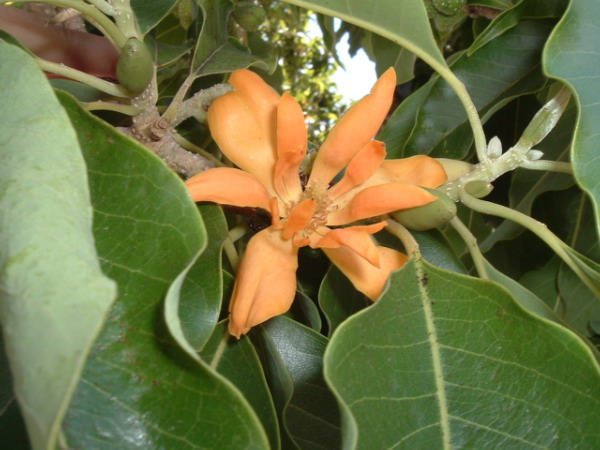
Orange coloured variety flower at over bloom

Magnolia champaca varieties and hybrids include:

- Magnolia (Michelia) champaca var. champaca — Huang lan (yuan bian zhong), (黄兰(原变种)) in Chinese. To 30 metres (98 ft) tall, documented in China.
- Magnolia (Michelia) champaca var. pubinervia — Mao ye mai huang lan (毛叶脉黄兰) in Chinese. To 50 metres (160 ft) tall or taller, documented in China.
- Magnolia × alba — white-flowered hybrid of Magnolia champaca and Magnolia montana.

In Thailand, there are other purported hybrids cultivated with other species, including with Magnolia liliifera and Magnolia coco.

== Distribution and habitat ==
The tree is native to the Indomalayan realm, consisting of South Asia, Southeast Asia−Indochina, and southern China.

It is found in tropical and subtropical moist broadleaf forests ecoregions, at elevations of 200–1,600 metres (660–5,250 ft). It is native to the Maldives, Bangladesh, Cambodia, China, India, Indonesia, Malaysia, Myanmar, Nepal, the Philippines, Thailand, and Vietnam. In China it is native to southern Tibet and southern/southwestern Yunnan Provinces. In 2021, an isolated, presumably native population of M. champaca was identified in Yemen, making M. champaca the only species in the Magnoliaceae known to inhabit the Arabian Peninsula.

== Ecology ==
The fragrant flowers attract butterflies and hummingbirds. Its aril-covered seeds are highly attractive to birds.

== Uses ==
=== Fragrance ===
The flowers are used in South Asia, especially India, for several purposes. They are primarily used in worship ceremonies, whether at home or out in temples, they are also more generally worn in hair by girls and women as a means of beauty ornament as well as a natural perfume. Flowers are floated in bowls of water to scent the room, as a fragrant and colourful decoration for bridal beds, and for garlands.

The tree was traditionally used to make fragrant hair and massage oils. Jean Patou's famous perfume, 'Joy', the second best selling perfume in the world after Chanel No. 5, is derived in part from the essential oils of champaca flowers. The vernacular name "Joy perfume tree" comes from this.

A scent similar to the scent of this plant is said to be emitted by a civet in Sri Lanka, Paradoxurus montanus. Because all the other civets are known to emit very unpleasant odours, this species is renowned for emitting a pleasant odour similar to this plant's scent.

=== Timber ===
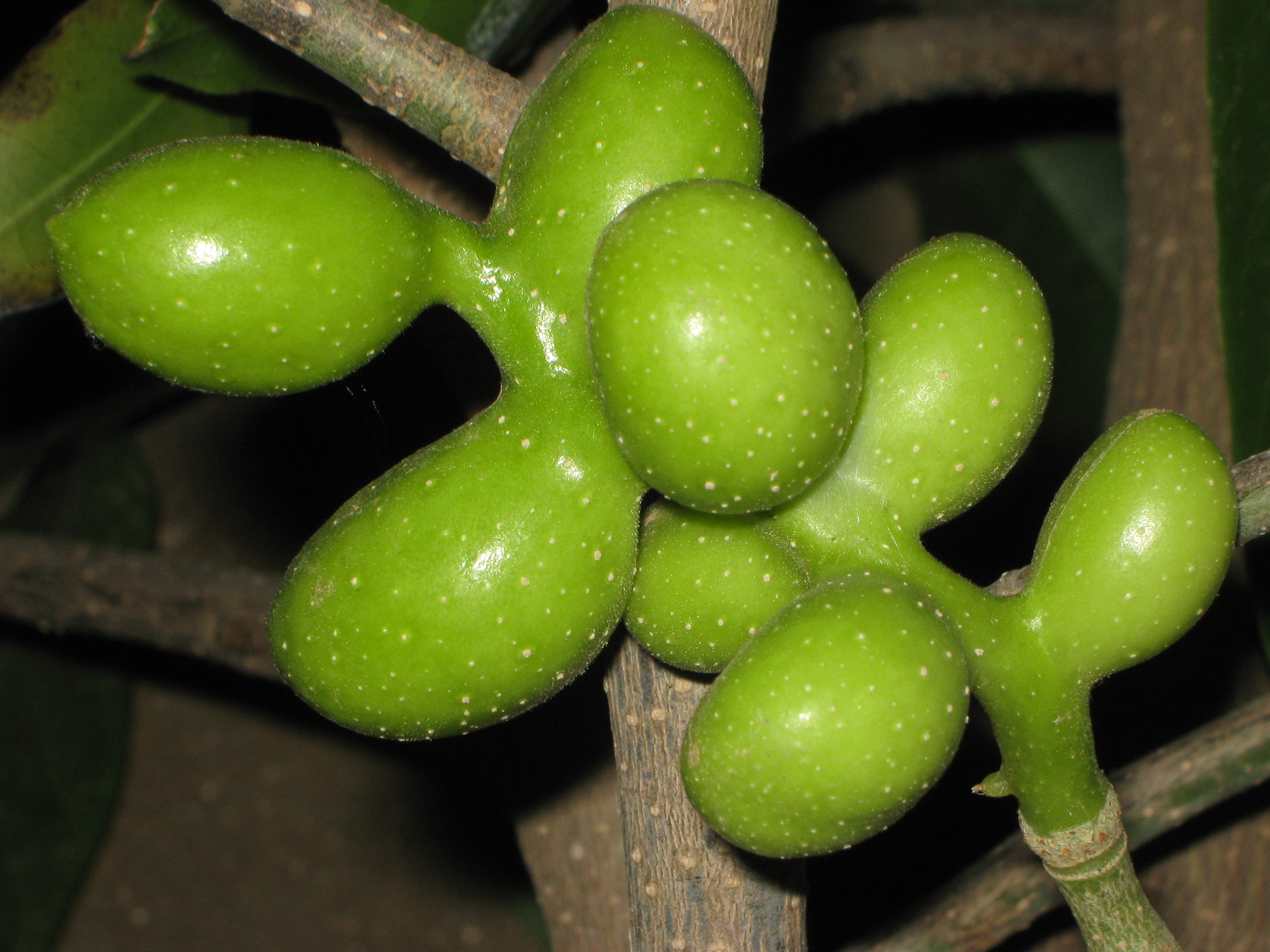
Fruits of the champak tree

In its native India and Southeast Asia, champaca is logged for its valuable timber. It has a finely textured, dark brown and olive-colored wood, which is used in furniture making, construction, and cabinetry.

The species is protected from logging in some states of India, especially in the Southwestern region, where certain groves are considered sacred by Hindus and Buddhists.

=== Cultivation ===
Magnolia champaca is cultivated by specialty plant nurseries as an ornamental plant, for its form as an ornamental tree, as a dense screening hedge, and for its fragrant flowers. It is planted in the ground in tropical and in subtropical climate gardens, such as in coastal Southern and Central California. It is planted in containers in cooler temperate climates. It requires full sun and regular watering.

== Alkaloids ==
Ushinsunine (aka Micheline A) [3175-89-1] is an aporphine alkaloid contained in Magnolia champaca.

== Cultural significance ==
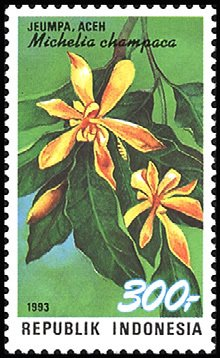
Indonesian Stamp of 1993, featuring the Jeumpa flower of Aceh.

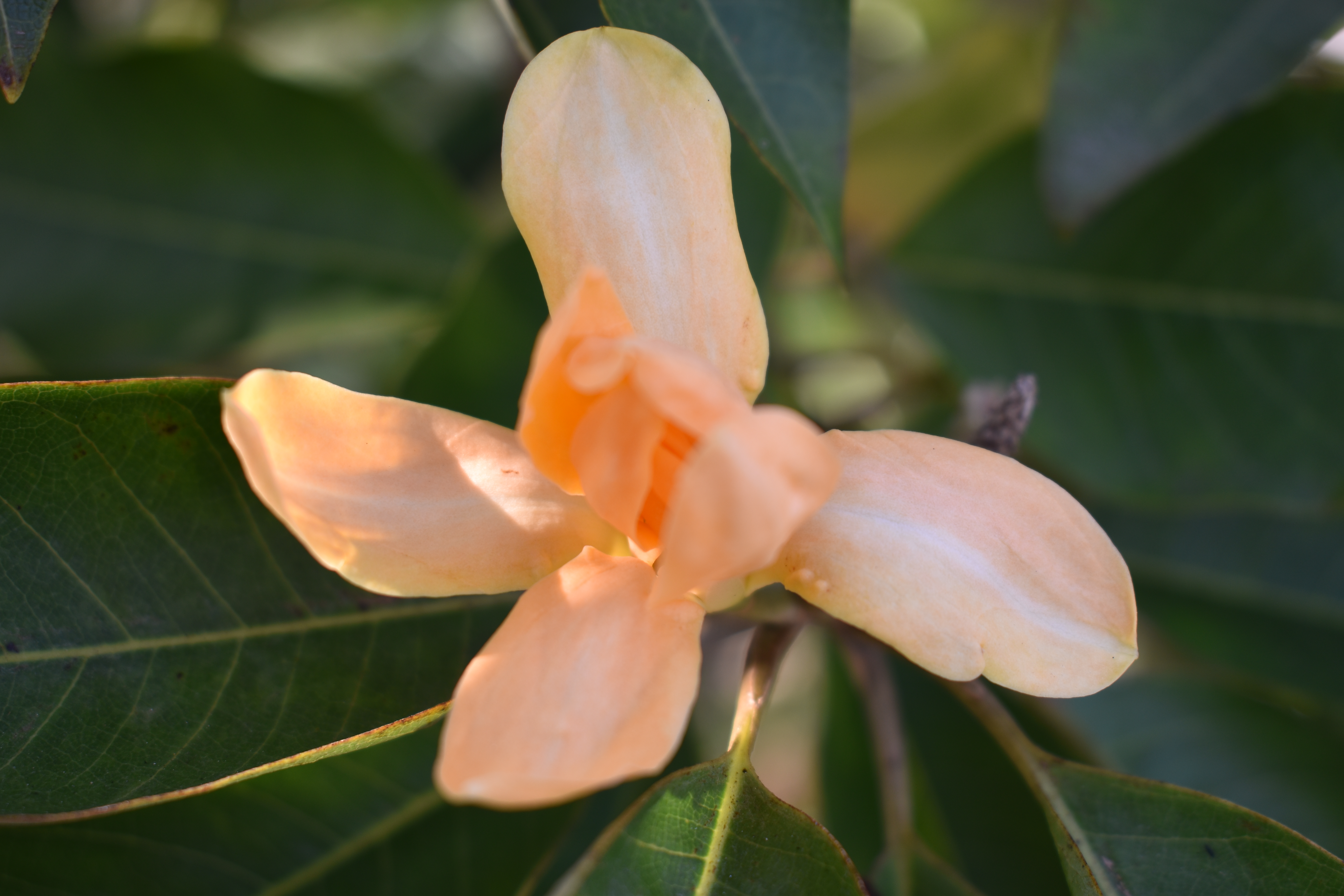
Magnolia champaca in India

In Theravada Buddhism, champaca is said to have been used as the tree for achieving enlightenment, or Bodhi, by the fourteenth Buddha called "Aththadassi – අත්ථදස්සි". According to Tibetan beliefs, the Buddha of the next era will find enlightenment under the white flower canopy of the champaca tree. It also has importance in Hindu culture.

In the province of Aceh, Indonesia, the champak flower (Acehnese: bungong jeumpa) is highly revered in Acehnese culture, being seen as the flower of Aceh as a whole. It's used as a symbol of beauty, commonly seen in rituals or used as ornaments. An Acehnese folk song titled Bungong Jeumpa (lit. 'Champak Flower') sings about its beauty and characteristics.

== Common names ==
Other vernacular names in English include joy perfume tree, yellow jade orchid tree and fragrant Himalayan champaca.
