= Muhammad Arief =

Indonesian musician and songwriter

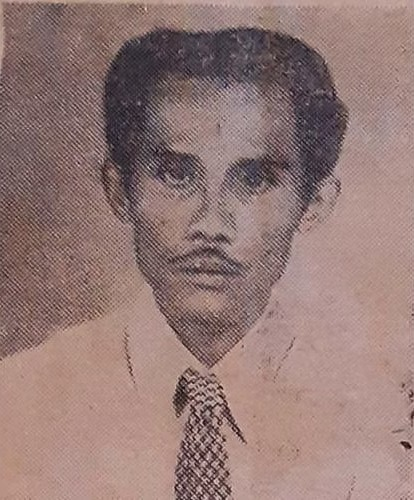
- Arief in 1965

Member of the Banyuwangi Mutual Assistance House of Representatives
- In office 1955–1965

Personal details
- Born: 1904 or 1905
- Party: PKI
- Spouse: Sayekti
- Children: 2
- Occupation: Politician; Musician

Muhammad Arief (1904 or 1905 - ?) was an Indonesian angklung musician, politician, and songwriter from Banyuwangi. He was known for writing and composing a song Genjer-genjer.

== Life ==
=== Early life and career ===
Arief was born in 1904 or 1905 to a religious family. He then worked as a farmer and also as an angklung creator and musician. During the Japanese ocuupation era, he was enlisted to the army. After the Proclamation of Indonesian Independence, he joined Indonesian Socialist Youth.

=== Angklung musician ===
In the early 1950s, Arief became a member of Lekra and served as its head of arts. He also composed and wrote a song Genjer-genjer in 1953. The song was inspired by what he witnessed during the Japanese occupation, where Banyuwangi people were forced to eat yellow velvetleaf, although they had never consumed this plant before, since it was for animal feed. Moreover, the song borrowed its melody from Tong Alak Gentak song. Other than that, he also composed song titled Nandur Jagung and Lerkung. One of the former Lekra members, Andang Chatib Yusuf, stipulated that Arief was a Banyuwangi traditional music reformer.

Arief was elected as a Member of the Banyuwangi Mutual Assistance House of Representatives in 1955 as an artist representative from PKI. In 1956, he created the genjer-genjer dance.In 1960, he founded the angklung organization, Young Indonesia People's Folk Art (Srimuda). As the head of Srimuda, he established the angklung studio in villages across Banyuwangi and the organization's headquarters in his own home. Every Srimuda member had to play the Banyuwangi angklung. Moreover, he also altered 40 Banyuwangi folk song lyrics to make them more revolutionary. Apart from being the head of Srimuda, he also registered as a member of Peasants Front of Indonesia.

In 1962, Njoto and Presidential palace artists paid a visit to Banyuwangi, and Arief greeted them by playing the Genjer-Genjer song. After listening to that song, Njoto said that Genjer-Genjer would spread widely and become a national song. Since Nyoto's and his entourage's visit to Banyuwangi, Genjer-Genjer's popularity surged and was aired on RRI and TVRI.

=== Arrest and Disappearance ===
After the 30 September Movement incident, an unknown group attacked Arief's house in Banyuwangi town, causing him and his family to flee. Two hours after the attack, they returned and found that their house was destroyed, leaving only a hundred books and song scripts. Realizing that he was still unsafe, he left the house and burned leftist books. Upon leaving home, the army arrested and detained him in military police headquarters. The next day, his wife and son met him, and it was their last family meeting.

The government transferred Arief to Kalibaru and later to Lowokwaru. During his imprisonment in Lowokwaru, he did not socialize too much with other people since he always contemplated the fate of his angklung group members. Two months later, he was called to move to Sukabumi. He left his cell and never appeared. He was believed to be executed, although his body has yet to be found.

=== Personal life ===
Arief was married to Sayekti. The couple had one son, Sinar Syamsi, and one adopted daughter, Siti Hanani. He was also fluent in Arabic.

== Discography ==
- Genjer-genjer (1953)
- Lerkung
- Nandur Jagung

== See also ==
- List of people who disappeared mysteriously (1910–1970)

== Bibliography ==
- Tempo, Tempo (January 2014). Seri Tempo: Lekra dan Geger 1965. Seri Tempo: Lekra dan Geger 1965: Tempo. ISBN 978-979-91-0673-5.
