= Bungong Jeumpa =

Acehnese folk song

Song
- Language: Acehnese
- Genre: Traditional
- Songwriter: Unknown
- Bungong Jeumpa A rendition of Bungong Jeumpa

Bungong Jeumpa (Jawoe: بوڠوڠ جمڤا; pronounced [bu.ŋɔŋ ɟɯm.pa]; lit. 'Champak Flower') is a folk song from Aceh, Indonesia. It is among the most popular folk songs in the Acehnese language.

== Background ==
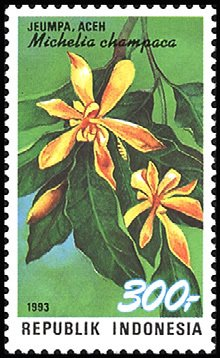
Indonesian Stamp of 1993, featuring the Jeumpa flower of Aceh.

The champak flower is native to Aceh where it can be commonly found. It is highly respected in Acehnese culture. Used as a symbol of beauty, it is often seen in rituals or used as ornaments. Due to its influence in Acehnese culture, the champak flower has become the floral emblem of Aceh.

Bungong Jeumpa is thought to originate from the Jeumpa Kingdom from the 7th century. The authorship of Bungong Jeumpa is highly contested, while some sources claim Ibrahim Abduh to be the author, native Acehnese musicians argued that Bungong Jeumpa has no true authorship as a folk song or that the author is unknown.

== Description ==
Bungong Jeumpa's lyrics describes the beauty of the champak flower, from its appearance to its smell. It often accompanies a traditional dance of the same name.

== Renditions ==
The first known rendition of Bungong Jeumpa is from a qasidah album "Acehnese Nasheed. Arabian Style Acehnese Songs" (Indonesian: Nasyid Aceh. Lagu-Lagu Irama Padang Pasir Berbahasa Aceh). Another old rendition is from 1980 by Vivi Sumanti in her album "My Nusantara, Your Nusantara" (Indonesian: Nusantaraku, Nusantaramu). The album contains several renditions of Indonesian folk songs including Bungong Jeumpa.

=== Other notable recordings ===
- Under Restu Record, Manja Group released a cover of Bungong Jeumpa in 2001. Their rendition has an additional intro and verse that's not present in the original song.
- It was featured alongside other Acehnese folk songs in the album "Indonesian Folksongs, Vol. 11: Aceh" in 2005. It was sung by Ozi Syahputra and Cut Yanthi.

== Lyrics ==
Acehnese lyrics

𝄆 Bungong jeumpa, bungong jeumpa
Meugah di Acèh
Bungong teuleubèh, teuleubèh
Indah lagoina 𝄇

𝄆 Putéh, kunèng, meujampu mirah
Keumang siulah cidah that rupa 𝄇

𝄆 Lam sinar buleuën, lam sinar buleuën
Angèn peuayôn
Rurôh meususôn, meususôn
Nyang mala-mala 𝄇

𝄆 Mangat that mubèë meunyö tatém côm
Leupah that harôm, si bungong jeumpa 𝄇

Jawoe script

𝄇 بوڠوڠ جمڤا، بوڠوڠ جمڤا
مݢه د اچيه
بوڠوڠ تلبيه، تلبيه
اينده لاݢوينا 𝄆

𝄇 ڤوتيه، کونيڠ، مچمڤور مره
کمڠ سيوله چيده تهت روڤا 𝄆

𝄇 لام سينر بولن، لام سينر بولن
اڠين ڤأيون
روروه مسوسون، مسوسون
ڽڠ مالا٢ 𝄆

𝄇 ماڠت تهت موباءو مڽو تتيم چوم
لفه تهت هاروم، سي بوڠوڠ جمڤا 𝄆

IPA transcription

𝄆 [bu.ŋɔŋ ɟɯm.pa bu.ŋɔŋ ɟɯm.pa]
[mɯ.gah di a.cɛh]
[bu.ŋoŋ tɯ.lɯ.bɛh tɯ.lɯ.bɛh]
[in.dah la.gɔi̯.na] 𝄇

𝄆 [pu.tɛh ku.neŋ mɯ.ɟam.pu mi.rah]
[kɯ.maŋ si.ʔu.lah ci.dah tʰat̚ ru.pa] 𝄇

𝄆 [lam si.nar bu.lɯə̯n lam si.nar bu.lɯə̯n]
[a.ŋɛn pɯ.ʔayon]
[ru.roh mɯ.su.son mɯ.su.son]
[ɲaŋ ma.la.ma.la] 𝄇

𝄆 [ma.ŋat̚ tʰat̚ mu.bɛə̯ mɯ.ɲʌ ta.tɛm com]
[lɯ.pah tʰat̚ ha.rom si bu.ŋɔŋ jɯm.pa] 𝄇

Translation

𝄆 Champak flower, champak flower
Well known throughout Aceh
A flower that's truly, that's truly
Beautiful in appearance 𝄇

𝄆 White, yellow, with a blend of red
When it blooms, it's very beautiful 𝄇

𝄆 In the moonlight, in the moonlight
The wind swings it away
Falling in rows, in rows
Those which has withered 𝄇

𝄆 Fragrant in smell when you smell it
How fragrant the champak flower is 𝄇

== See also ==
- List of Indonesian folk songs

== Bibliography ==
- Rangkuti, R.E (1981). Kumpulan Lagu-Lagu Daerah Dilengkapi dengan Akord [A Collection of Regional Folk Songs Compelte with its Chords] (in Indonesian). Titik Terang.
