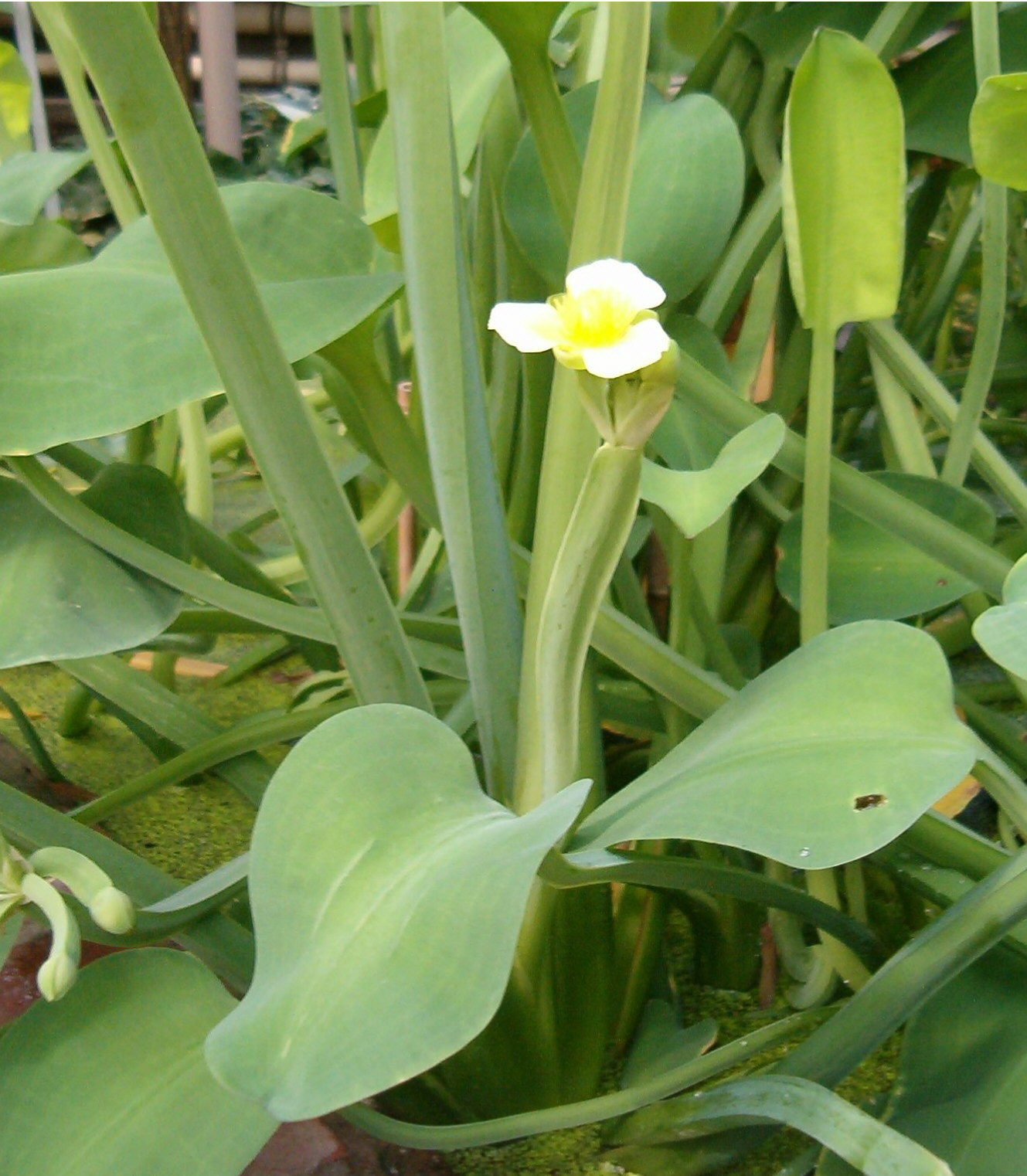

Scientific classification
- Kingdom: Plantae
- Clade: Tracheophytes
- Clade: Angiosperms
- Clade: Monocots
- Order: Alismatales
- Family: Alismataceae
- Genus: Limnocharis
- Species: L. flava

Binomial name
- Limnocharis flava (L.) Buchenau

Synonyms
- Alisma flavum L.; Damasonium flavum (L.) Mill.; Limnocharis emarginata Humb. & Bonpl.; Limnocharis flava var. indica Buchenau; Limnocharis plumieri Rich.

= Limnocharis flava =

Species of plant

Limnocharis flava (commonly known as yellow velvetleaf, sawah flower rush, sawah lettuce) is a species of aquatic flowering plant which is native to Mexico, Central America, South America, Cuba, Haiti and the Dominican Republic but widely naturalized in southern and southeastern Asia: India, Sri Lanka, Cambodia, Burma, Thailand, Vietnam, Indonesia, Malaysia, Brunei and southern China (Guangdong, Yunnan).

Limnocharis flava is roughly 50 centimetres (20 in) tall growing in clumps. Its triangular-shaped leaves and hollow stems are glabrous. Its inflorescences have a very characteristic shape, producing three-lobed yellow flowers about 1.5 cm in diameter. The fruits are spherical. Although it is not a floating plant, its seeds are carried away by currents.

Yellow velvetleaf grows generally wherever there is not very deep stagnant fresh water, in swampy areas. It sometimes invades rice fields where it can become a weed. As an invasive species it has become a pest in some wetlands in other parts of the world.

== As food ==
Traditionally this plant is an important vegetable in parts of Indonesia, the Philippines, Vietnam, Laos, Isan (Thailand) and parts of India, where the central flower stalk and the leaves are used in soups, curries, salads and stir-fries. The immature flower buds are also eaten. In Isan the leaf is eaten raw with nam phrik. Owing to its flat taste, in some areas it is considered "poor people's food" or emergency food, eaten whenever there is not much else left. This characteristic was put into song by Muhammad Arief, in the 1940s hit Genjer-genjer in the Banyuwangi language in Java.

== See also ==
- List of plants with edible leaves
- Thai cuisine
- Lao cuisine
- Indonesian cuisine
- Javanese cuisine
- List of Thai ingredients
- List of freshwater aquarium plant species
