= World Music from Aceh =

Music album released in 2002

Studio album by Nyawöung Aceh
- Released: August 2002
- Genres: Traditional, World music
- Length: 59:41
- Language: Acehnese
- Label: Joe Project
- Producers: Jauhari Samalanga, Agam Ilyas

Nyawöung Aceh chronology
Album Aceh: Nyawöung (2000)	World Music from Aceh (2002)

Bungong, World Music from Aceh
- Spotify and YouTube cover, 2009

World Music from Aceh, also known as Bungong (lit. 'Flower'), (Note: On Spotify and YouTube, this album is called Bungong, World Music from Aceh) is the second album by Nyawöung Aceh, released in August 2002.

== Background ==
After their first album, Nyawöung, was released in 2000, their songs became widespread, often appearing in national TV and radios as illustrative music for topics related to Aceh. In 2001, Metro TV contacted the Community of Nyawöung to create music for their programme "Aceh: Merentas Jalan Baru" (lit. 'Aceh: Forging A New Path') where they offer a payment of Rp 750,000 per episode, Joe agreed to this offer and they start working on making songs in mid-September 2001.

In June 2001, The Community of Nyawöung (now renamed to Nyawöung Aceh) started working on five additional renditions of traditional folk songs. After picking another five songs from their collaboration with Metro TV, they compiled the ten songs into their album, World Music from Aceh, with Bungong as its main song.

== Track listing ==
No.	Title	Lyrics	Singer	Length
1.	"Peumulia" (Praises)	Nyawöung Aceh	Yusdedy	03:25
2.	"Nyang Na" (As It Is)	Marzuki Hasan, Yusdedy, Hasbi Burman	Yusdedy	07:14
3.	"Trôh Bak Watèë" (The Time Has Come)	Traditional, Sibas	Kurniatun Z.	02:50
4.	"Bungong" (Flower)	Syeh Lah Bangguna	Yusdedy	09:47
5.	"Hasan Husein" (Hasan and Husayn)	Nyawöung Aceh	Yusdedy	05:53
6.	"Beusaré-Saré" (Together)	Nyawöung Aceh	Marzuki Hasan	07:03
7.	"Bungong Nanggroë" (The State's Flower)	Yusdedy, Nyawöung Aceh	Yusdedy, Nyawöung Aceh	09:25
8.	"Jak Tabeudoh" (Let's Rise)	Marzuki Hasan	Marzuki Hasan	03:36
9.	"Paroh Tulo" (Driving Away Sparrows)	Ibnoe Arhas, Nyawöung Aceh	Yusdedy, Nyawöung Aceh	05:39
10.	"Ya Allah Bi Ha" (Oh Allah)	Marzuki Hasan	Marzuki Hasan	02:50
11.	"Rabbani" (Oh Our Lord)	Nyawöung Aceh	Marzuki Hasan	03:06
Total length:				59:41
