= Titiek Puspa =

Indonesian singer and songwriter (1937–2025)

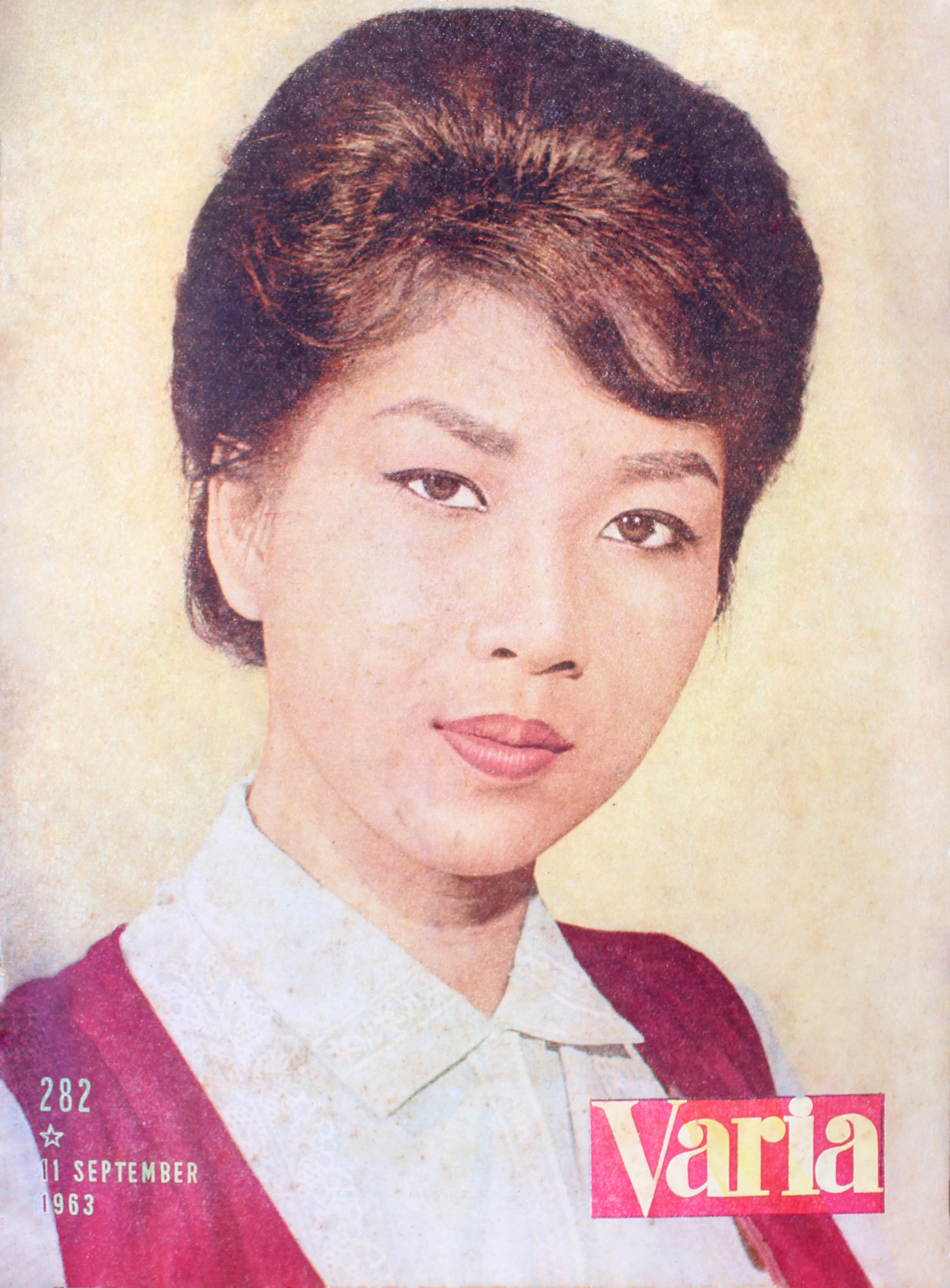
- Puspa on cover of Varia (1963)

Background information
- Born: Sudarwati; 1 November 1937; Tanjung, Dutch East Indies
- Died: 10 April 2025 (aged 87) Jakarta, Indonesia
- Genre: Indo pop
- Occupations: Singer; songwriter; actress
- Years active: 1954–2025
- Spouses: Kasno (m. 1957–1959); Zainal Ardi (m. 1960–1963); Mus Mualim (m. 1970; died 1991)

Sudarwati (Indonesian: [sudarˈwati]; 1 November 1937 – 10 April 2025), better known by her stage name Titiek Puspa (Indonesian: [tiˈtiək ˈpuspa]), was an Indonesian singer and songwriter. In 2009, Rolling Stone Indonesia selected four songs written by Puspa as some of the best Indonesian songs of all time.

== Background ==
Puspa was born with the name Sudarwati in Tanjung, Dutch Borneo (now South Kalimantan), on 1 November 1937, to Tugeno Puspowidjojo and Siti Mariam. Her father, a Javanese man, had moved the family to Tanjung for work; after Sudarwati's birth, the family moved to Semarang. Her family later changed her name to Kadarwati, and then finally to Sumarti; she was a sickly child, and cultural customs suggested that a name change could help her recover. She was the fourth of twelve children. As a child, she wanted to be a kindergarten teacher. However, after winning several singing competitions, she decided to become an entertainer, making the decision around age 14. Her parents forbade her from doing so.

== Career ==
Puspa was an alto, with a "warm, husky, and strong" timbre, unlike many of the popular soprano singers of the 1960s. She modeled her singing technique on Dutch singer Anneke Gronloh, American jazz singer Ella Fitzgerald, and American pop and country singer Patti Page.

Puspa considered her career to have started in 1954, when she won a Radio Republik Indonesia singing competition in Semarang, Central Java. Her stage name was chosen by President Sukarno during the 1950s.

In 1959, she moved to Jakarta and began performing for a living. That year she also made her first recording for Lokananta, the country's first record label. In 1960, Puspa began working as a lounge singer at Hotel Des Indes (later renamed Duta Merlin) in Harmoni, Jakarta. Puspa was asked by Sjaiful Bachri of the Jakarta Symphony Orchestra to sing for them. After her performance of Ismail Marzuki's song "Chandra Buana", the group elected to keep her as their regular singer. She left the orchestra in 1962.

In 1974, Puspa won the National Pop Song Festival with her song "Cinta". In November 1974, she was sent to the World Popular Song Festival in Tokyo as the representative for Indonesia. She reached the semi-finals of the competition.

In 1984, Puspa and Euis Darliah won the Bronze Prize at the World Song Festival in Los Angeles with the song "Horas Kasih".

Puspa was a palace singer for Sukarno and Suharto, "performing at national ceremonies and state functions for visiting foreign dignitaries". She was among two Indonesian cultural missions, to Malaya in 1960 and the Netherlands in 1965. She composed the song Bapak pembangunan for Suharto in 1985.

Her song Aku Anak Desa was popular in the 1980s.

In a 2008 interview with Bruce Edmond of The Jakarta Post, Puspa stated that "[s]ongs are my medicine, my vitamins, they make my life better".

=== Songwriting and themes ===
Puspa was also a composer, learning from her husband, jazz pianist Mus Mualim, in the early days of their marriage. She largely composed in the hiburan genre, a more Western-influenced music genre which has been compared to easy listening, a genre popular in the United States around the same time. She drew from both Indonesian and foreign influences, such as "pop, rock 'n' roll, jazz, Broadway, and blues". To avoid censorship of songs that had more foreign musical influence, Puspa paired them with patriotic or nationalistic lyrics.

In the 1960s, many of Puspa's songs focused on the common people (rakyat) and the economic difficulties they faced. Her song "Buat adikku" referenced 1966 student protests. In the 1970s, Puspa recorded several songs "about modern women", including "Kupu-kupu Malam" (recorded 1977), which may be Puspa's best known song. The lyrics sympathetically describe a "woman of the night", noting the stigma against sex workers and the difficulties they face. In contrast to societal views at the time, the song's narrator suggests that the woman, who is working to survive, has done less wrong compared to the men who solicit sex from her. Another song from the decade, "Bimbi", describes a village girl who moves to the city.

In 1997, her song "Menabung" won Best Children's Song at the Anugerah Music Indonesia Awards.

=== Acting and theatre ===
In the mid-1960s, Puspa entered cinema, acting in multiple films into the 1980s. Her first film was Minah Gadis Dusun (1965) which earned her a position as a potential actress in Indonesia. In this film, she portrayed a main character which reflects the life of village society with all its dynamics and challenges. Through this character, Puspa not only shows her acting skills but also conveys a social message that is relevant to real life. Her next film was Dibalik Tjahaja Gemerlapan (1966) which was directed by Misbach Yusa Biran in which she act in the art troupe. This film highlights the dynamics of the artists' lives behind the scenes and the character played by Puspa provides an in-depth perspective on the struggles, intrigues, and awakenings of artists in the face of the twists and turns of life. Dibalik Tjahaja Gemerlapan (1966) is not only interesting in terms of story, but also touches on the aspirations of artists who are struggling to realize their dreams. Puspa's third film, Bawang Putih (1974) was one of her legendary film. In this film, she plays Mak Bakung, a stepmother who is full of hatred and prejudice. The story is taken from a famous folk tale, and although it focuses on the antagonist character, Puspa's performance is able to touch the hearts of the audience with strong emotions. This film is an epic in the musical drama genre, with Puspa successfully bringing the character to life, while providing a rich nuance to the audience. She then starred in Tiga Cewek Bandung (1975) as one of three young women who looking for a job along with Enny Haryono and Deasy Arisandi. Puspa shows natural comedic talent and the characters she plays give a positive impression and laughter to the audience, showing that women empowerment can be conveyed through comedy. She later starred in her last film Apanya Dong (1983) as a woman involved in a complicated relationship with a Chinese man and is one of Puspa's three examples of exploring the theme of urban social life. This work depicts various colorful subplots, with fresh humor about social life, a production that is very worthy of admiration. Puspa's acting conveys complex emotional depths, and her ability to capture the nuances of comedy.

In the 1970s, she composed multiple operettas, including Bawang merah bawang putih (1972), Ketupat Lebaran (1974), and Kartini manusiawi Kartini (1978). In 1972, she founded the group Papiko, an arts organization which performed some of her operettas and appeared on televised variety shows on TVRI, particularly around Eid al-Fitr. Papiko's final televised program aired in 1985.

== Legacy and awards ==
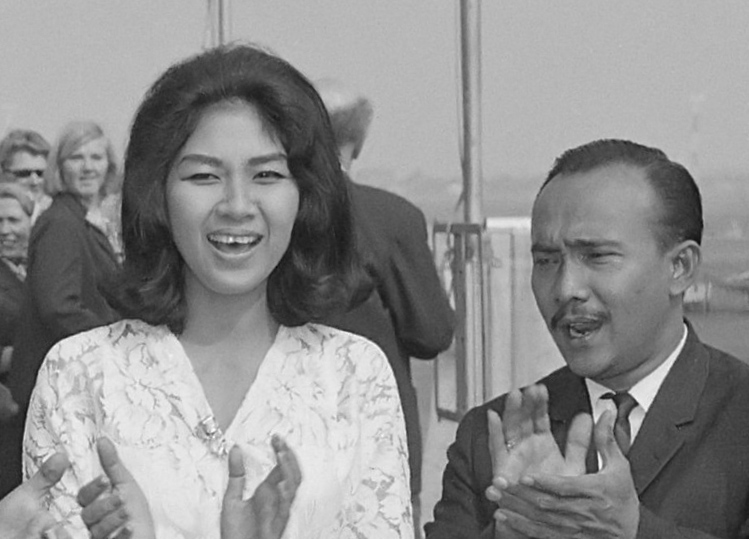
Puspa with Bing Slamet in 1965; their friendship inspired her to write the song "Bing" after the latter's death.

Puspa has been described as "the grand dame of Indonesian entertainment". In 1963 the Indonesian variety magazine Varia described her name and voice as "inseparable", writing that listeners would stop their activities to focus on her songs when played on the radio.

Alberthiene Endah wrote a biography of Puspa, entitled "A Legendary Diva". It was released in 2008.

Four of Puspa's songs, "Kupu-Kupu Malam" (from the album of the same name), "Bing" (from Cinta), "Gang Kelinci" (sung by Lilis Suryani) and "Mari-Mari" (performed by Dara Puspita) were selected as some of the best Indonesian songs of all time by Rolling Stone Indonesia in 2009. "Kupu-Kupu Malam" was ranked 32nd; the write-up noted that the song was an unbiased look at prostitution in Indonesia, with Puspa's vocals at times as if she were holding back tears and at other times roaring with strength. "Bing", Puspa's tribute to Bing Slamet, was ranked 41st and described as being capable of expressing her feelings of loss without coming across as overly emotional, "Gang Kelinci" was ranked 66th, while "Mari-Mari" was ranked 113th.

In 2017, Puspa received the Special Award from ASIRI for "her lifetime dedication to the music industry".

== Personal life ==
Puspa was married three times; she married her first husband, Kasno, in 1957, at age 19. The couple divorced in 1959, when she was pregnant with their first child. She married her second husband, RRI radio announcer Zainal Ardi, in 1960, with whom she had a second daughter. She separated from Ardi in 1963. She later married Mus Mualim, a Radio Republik Indonesia employee. The pair remained married until Mualim's death in 1991. Puspa originally began learning songwriting from her husband in the early days of their marriage.

Puspa lived in South Jakarta. In 2009, Puspa was diagnosed with cervical cancer. After several months of treatment, including two months of chemotherapy at the Mount Elizabeth Hospital in Singapore (where she wrote 61 songs), she was declared to be free of cancer. She credited her prayer and meditation in the hospital with her success at fighting cancer.

Puspa was Muslim. In the early 2000s, she traveled to Mecca on pilgrimage.

=== Death ===
On 26 March 2025, Puspa was invited to appear on the Trans7 sketch comedy show Lapor Pak!, and finished the shooting process at 8pm. Shortly after the end of shooting, she suddenly collapsed in the studio and was rushed to the hospital by the television crew. On 10 April, Puspa died at Medistra Hospital in Setiabudi, South Jakarta, at the age of 87, due to a intracerebral hemorrhage. Days before her death, she made an Eid greeting as her final Instagram post in which she said 'bye bye' at the end of the video, sparking public speculation.

== Works ==
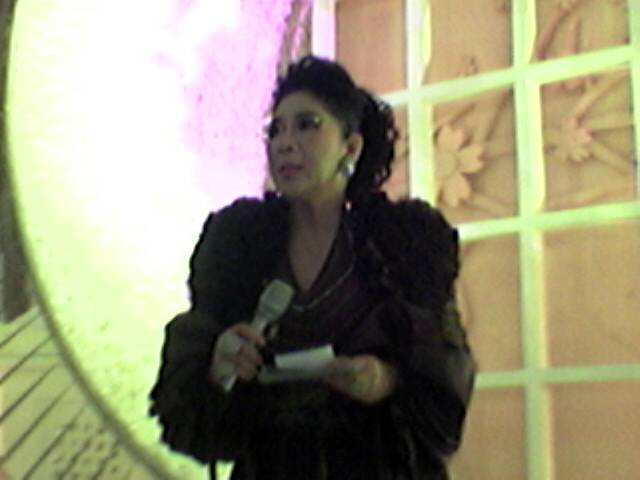
Puspa performing in Cirebon, 2008

=== Discography ===
==== Albums ====
The following is a list of Puspa's albums:

- Dian Nan Tak Kundjung Padam (Lokananta, 1954)
- Djakarta di Waktu Malam (Irama Records, 1956)
- Pantang Mundur (Irama Records, 1963)
- Si Hitam (Irama Records, 1964); with Mus Mualim
- Aneka Gaja Titiek Puspa (Irama Records, 1965)
- Pita (Irama Records, 1966)
- Doa Ibu (Irama Records, 1966); with Mus Mualim
- Titiek Puspa (Irama Records, 1967)
- Album Kenangan (Irama Records, 1967)
- Romi dan Juli (Canary Record, 1971); with Bing Slamet
- Cinta (Paragon Record, 1975)
- Hidupku Untuk Cinta (MGM, 1976)
- Kupu-Kupu Malam (English: Night Butterflies; Purnama Records, 1977)
- Karya Terbaik (Yukawi Records, 1977)
- Bunga Pujaan (Irama Tara, 1977)
- Mini Si Mini (Irama Tara, 1977)
- Sapiku (Purnama Records, 1980)
- Tinggal Bilang Yang (Musica Studios, 1981)
- Otobiografi Titiek Puspa (DD Records, 1982); featuring Anita Rachman
- Saya Cinta Buatan Indonesia (DD Records, 1982)
- Ronce - Ronce (Fajar Records, 1983)
- Apanya Dong (English:What; Atlantic Record, 1984); with Euis Daliah
- Dicoba Dong! (DD Records, 1985)
- Bambu Bambu (Billboard Records, 1986)
- Virus Cinta (English: Love Virus; Musica Studios, 1997)
- From Us To You (Musica Studios, 2005)
- Titiek Puspa 70 th (Sony BMG, 2007)
- Duta Cinta & Titiek Puspa (Musica Studios); certified Double Platinum in 2017 by ASIRI

==== Selected singles ====
- "Mama" (1964); written in honor of her mother's death
- "Horas Kasih" (1984), with Euis Darliah

=== Filmography ===
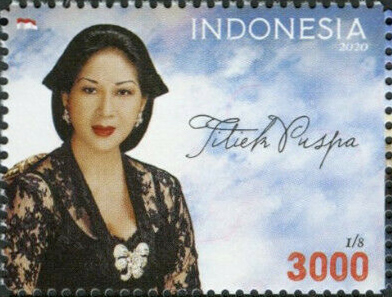
Puspa on a 2020 Indonesian stamp

The following is a list of sinetron and films that Puspa performed in:

- Di Balik Cahaya Gemerlapan (English: Behind the Shimmering Light; Persari, 1966)
- Minah Gadis Dusun (Minah the Village Girl; Berdikari Film, 1966)
- Bing Slamet Setan Djalanan (Safari Sinar Sakti Film, 1972)
- Pemburu Mayat (Avatara Film, 1972)
- Rio Anakku (PT Rapi Film, 1973)
- Bawang Putih (Safari Sinar Sakti Film, 1974)
- Ateng Minta Kawin (Safari Sinar Sakti Film, 1974)
- Tiga Cewak Badung (Safari Sinar Sakti Film, 1975)
- Inem Pelayan Sexy (Inem the Sexy Maid; PT Candi Dewi Film, 1976)
- Inem Pelayan Sexy II (Inem the Sexy Maid 2; PT Candi Dewi Film, 1977)
- Karminem (NV Perfini, 1977)
- Kisah Cinta Rojali dan Juleha (PT Inem Film, 1979)
- Tutul Perempuan (Tobali Indah Film, 1979)
- Gadis (PT Inem Film, 1980)
- Putri Giok (PT Sjam Studio Film Production, 1980)
- Koboi Sutra Ungu (English: Purple Silk Cowboy; PT Parkit Film, 1981)
- Apanya Dong (PT Inem Film, 1983)

== Awards and nominations ==
Year	Award	Category	Work	Result	Ref.
1997	Anugerah Musik Indonesia	Best Children's Song	"Menabung" (writer)	Won	
2016	Indonesian Film Festival	Citra Award for Best Supporting Actress	Ini Kisah Tiga Dara	Nominated	
