= Album Aceh: Nyawöung =

Music album released in 2000

- Cassette cover

Studio album by Community of Nyawöung
- Released: August 2000
- Genres: Traditional, Rock, World music
- Length: 43:03
- Language: Acehnese
- Label: Joe Project
- Producer: Jauhari Samalanga

Community of Nyawöung chronology
| Album Aceh: Nyawöung (2000) | World Music from Aceh (2002) |

Nyawoung Aceh
- Spotify and YouTube cover, 2012

Album Aceh: Nyawöung (Acehnese: Album Acèh: Nyawöung, lit. 'Aceh's Album: Spirit'), (Note: On Spotify and YouTube, this album is simply called Nyawoung Aceh.) simply known as Nyawöung (lit. 'Spirit'), is an album released under the label Joe Project. Released in August 2000, Nyawöung is a collaboration album between several Acehnese singers and musicians led by Joe, the nickname of Jauhari Samalanga.

Nyawöung consists of Acehnese folk songs and songs describing the Acehnese conflict from the perspective of Aceh and its effects on the ordinary people who suffer from it. At the time, it became one of the fastest selling albums in Aceh.

== Background ==
In June 1996, Mukhlis travelled to Jakarta from Yogyakarta with Agam Ilyas, Joe's brother. He was brought to their residence in Utan Kayu, East Jakarta, where he and Joe discussed Acehnese culture and art. Mukhlis told of his occupation as an Acehnese art lecturer in Syiah Kuala University. Not long after their first meeting, Mukhlis returned to Aceh.

In Takengon, early September 1997, Joe found several worn out cassettes at an aluminium store by the name of Apollo, which also sells a variety of secondhand goods. All regional cassettes were labelled with their genre and from what region they came. He took all the cassettes labeled 'Acehnese', totalling four, two of which contained music often used for Tari Seudati, a traditional Acehnese dance. When he arrived home, he listened to the other cassettes, one containing an Acehnese lullaby, Dô Da Idi, a song about the return of an Acehnese king and warrior, Panglima Prang (lit. 'War Commander'), and a song about the campaign against Johor by Iskandar Muda, Prang Sabil (lit. 'Holy War'). One song that caught Joe's attention is Nyawöung, a song about mortality. Joe travelled to Jakarta to meet Ilyas, and they founded a community called Komunitas Etnis Ujung Barat (lit. 'Ethnic Group of the Westernmost Tip'), which was later renamed to Community of Nyawöung. After listening to the tapes on repeat, both approached Hafiz Syahnara, a friend who works at EMI Indonesia, a record label company.

In 1999, Joe contacted Dedy Adrian, a member from the band "Metazone" of Gayo blood, to help them record Acehnese songs for Nyawöung in Jakarta, which he happily agreed to do. Joe then sent some of his recordings to Dedy to be arranged. During the arrangement of the album, Joe was trying to find a lyricist and singer who could replicate Acehnese traditional poetry, which at the time was difficult as Aceh was in a time of conflict and most singers sang primarily in dangdut. He and Dedy contacted Mukhlis to be the singer, to which Mukhlis agreed, so they together flew from Banda Aceh to Jakarta. In the same year, Cut Aja Rizka, an Acehnese singer, met up with Joe alongside Nurdin Daud, the author of Dô Da Idi and a dance lecturer at Institut Kesenian Jakarta, in Ismail Marzuki Park, Jakarta.

== Release and reception ==
In August 2000, under the label Joe Project and Nuansa Media Pusaka Jakarta, and with a budget of around $38,000, the Community of Nyawöung released the album Nyawöung, which contains 10 songs in the Acehnese language.

After its release, it quickly gained attraction and love amongst the Acehnese public; the first edition of 5,000 cassettes sold out. In total, about 30,000 of the 45,000 copies of cassettes produced were sold in Aceh within six months. One of the factors of Nyawöung's success is its recording quality, as it was the first regional album produced to international recording standards. Nyawöung songs could be heard throughout the province to the point that it became synonymous with Aceh. Nyawöung songs were also popular amongst Free Aceh Movement's members.

== Conflict with the Indonesian government ==
After the release of Nyawöung and its wide popularity, Joe received news that the album became a target for eradication. Raids on Nyawöung cassettes began to be carried out in cassette stores in several areas of Aceh. In May 2001, several cassette shops in Pidie were raided by the Indonesian army; they were forced to take out all cassettes in the Acehnese language, specifically Nyawöung. After they were collected, they were burned in front of the shop; similar cases also happened in Central Aceh and North Aceh. After hearing reports from several people in Aceh about the raids for Nyawöung, distribution ceased to avoid further trouble.

On 19 May 2003, several Acehnese musicians and singers were called in for questioning by the Regional Martial Law Authority of Aceh. On November of the same year, several songs that were labelled as separatist or disrupting peace were outlawed, including Nyawöung.

In September 2004, Nyawöung was permitted to be marketed again with the addition that the song Harô-Hara (lit. 'Pandemonium') was removed, it was replaced with the song Trôh Bak Watèë (lit. 'The Time Has Come') from their second album, World Music from Aceh.

== Track listing ==
=== Original 2000 release ===
| No. | Title | Lyrics | Singer | Length |
|---|---|---|---|---|
| 1. | "Saleum" (Greetings) | Traditional (Mukhlis) | Mukhlis | 3:05 |
| 2. | "Prang Sabil" (Holy War) | Traditional | Mukhlis | 3:41 |
| 3. | "Harô-Hara" (Pandemonium) | Nurdin Daud | Cut Aja Rizka | 3:13 |
| 4. | "Nyawöung" (Spirit) | Di Husen | Mukhlis | 4:44 |
| 5. | "Adak Na" (If) | Mukhlis | Mukhlis | 3:28 |
| 6. | "Nanyeum Meurumpök" (Weaving Glances) | Jauhari Ilyas | Mukhlis | 3:51 |
| 7. | "Untong Kamoë Nyoë" (This is Our Fate) | Hasbi Burman | Mukhlis | 5:35 |
| 8. | "Panglima Prang" (War Commander) | Traditional | Cut Aja Rizka | 3:42 |
| 9. | "Dôdodaidi" (Acehnese Lullaby) | Traditional (Nurdin Daud) | Cut Aja Rizka | 5:08 |
| 10. | "Nyan Dum Abeuh" (That's All) | Traditional | Mukhlis | 3:39 |
| Total length: | | | | 40:11 |

=== 2004 re-release ===
| No. | Title | Lyrics | Singer | Length |
|---|---|---|---|---|
| 1. | "Saleum" (Greetings) | Traditional (Mukhlis) | Mukhlis | 3:05 |
| 2. | "Prang Sabil" (Holy War) | Traditional | Mukhlis | 3:41 |
| 3. | "Trôh Bak Watèe" (The Time Has Come) | Traditional | Kurniatun Z. | 2:54 |
| 4. | "Nyawöung" (Spirit) | Di Husen | Mukhlis | 4:44 |
| 5. | "Adak Na" (If) | Mukhlis | Mukhlis | 3:28 |
| 6. | "Nanyeum Meurumpök" (Weaving Glances) | Jauhari Ilyas | Mukhlis | 3:51 |
| 7. | "Untong Kamoë Nyoë" (This is Our Fate) | Hasbi Burman | Mukhlis | 5:35 |
| 8. | "Panglima Prang" (War Commander) | Traditional | Cut Aja Rizka | 3:42 |
| 9. | "Dôdodaidi" (Acehnese Lullaby) | Traditional (Nurdin Daud) | Cut Aja Rizka | 5:08 |
| 10. | "Nyan Dum Abeuh" (That's All) | Traditional | Mukhlis | 3:39 |
| Total length: | | | | 39:52 |

== See also ==
- Censorship in Indonesia
- Insurgency in Aceh
- World Music from Aceh
