= Lokananta =

Indonesian record label

Lokananta Recording
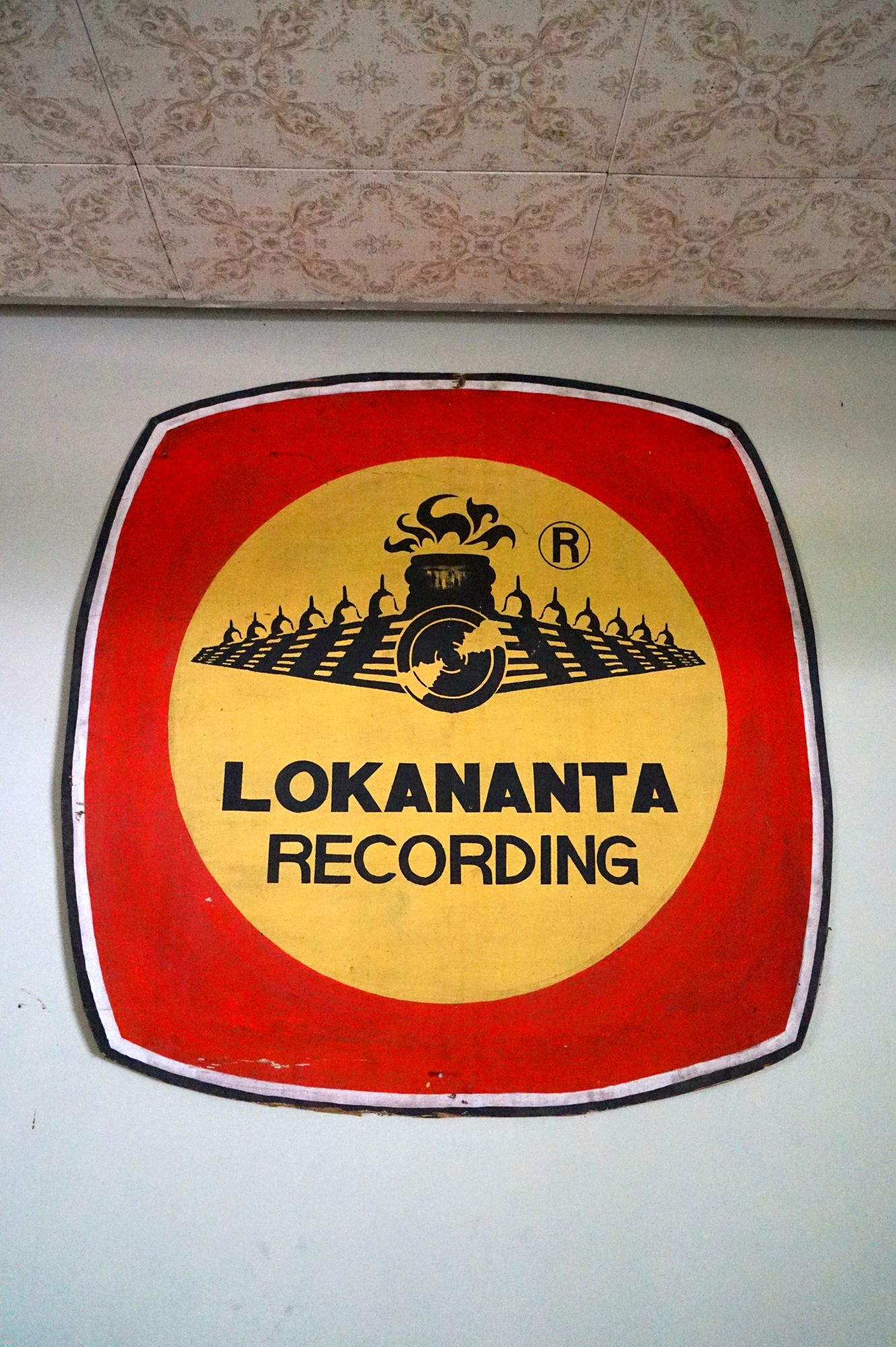
- Parent company: Percetakan Negara Republik Indonesia
- Founded: October 29, 1956
- Founder: Maladi et al.
- Genre: Various
- Country of origin: Indonesia
- Location: Surakarta, Central Java

Lokananta is the first record label of Indonesia. Based in Surakarta, Central Java, it was owned by the state-owned printing agency Percetakan Negara Republik Indonesia.

Lokananta has over 40,000 recordings, which include some 5,200 commercial labels, in its collection.

It currently has more than 5672 vinyl records of ethnic/folk music from all over Indonesia, and old Indonesian pop songs. Lokananta also has the biggest collection of keroncong and gamelan orchestras recordings (Javanese, Balinese, Sundanese, even Batak), together with the first recorded speeches of Indonesia's first president Sukarno and the original version of the national anthem.

They also have recordings of wayang performances, for example by Ki Nartosabdo, and Surakarta/Yogyakarta karawitan music.

Many Indonesian performers were introduced from Lokananta, including the famous Gesang (and his Bengawan Solo), Waljinah (and her Walang Kekek), Titiek Puspa, Bing Slamet, and Sam Saimun.

== History ==
Lokananta was established on 29 October 1956 at Surakarta. In the beginning of its history, its primary function was that of offering a transcription service for RRI radio network and manufacturing phonograph records and audio cassettes for broadcast by RRI stations throughout Indonesia; the master records were produced by the various RRI facilities and then sent to Surakarta for pressing.

The word Lokananta means "gamelan from heaven", was suggested by R. Maladi, the head of RRI at the time, and Surakarta was chosen because of its long history of radio broadcasting. Solosche Vereeniging (SRV) was the first Indonesian radio station that was established in 1933. Lokananta is also the name of the pitch-black gamelan set of Kraton Surakarta (Surakarta's Palace). It had the most modern equipment of its time, including the then state-of-the-art Trident Series 80B mixer, UREI 801 speaker.

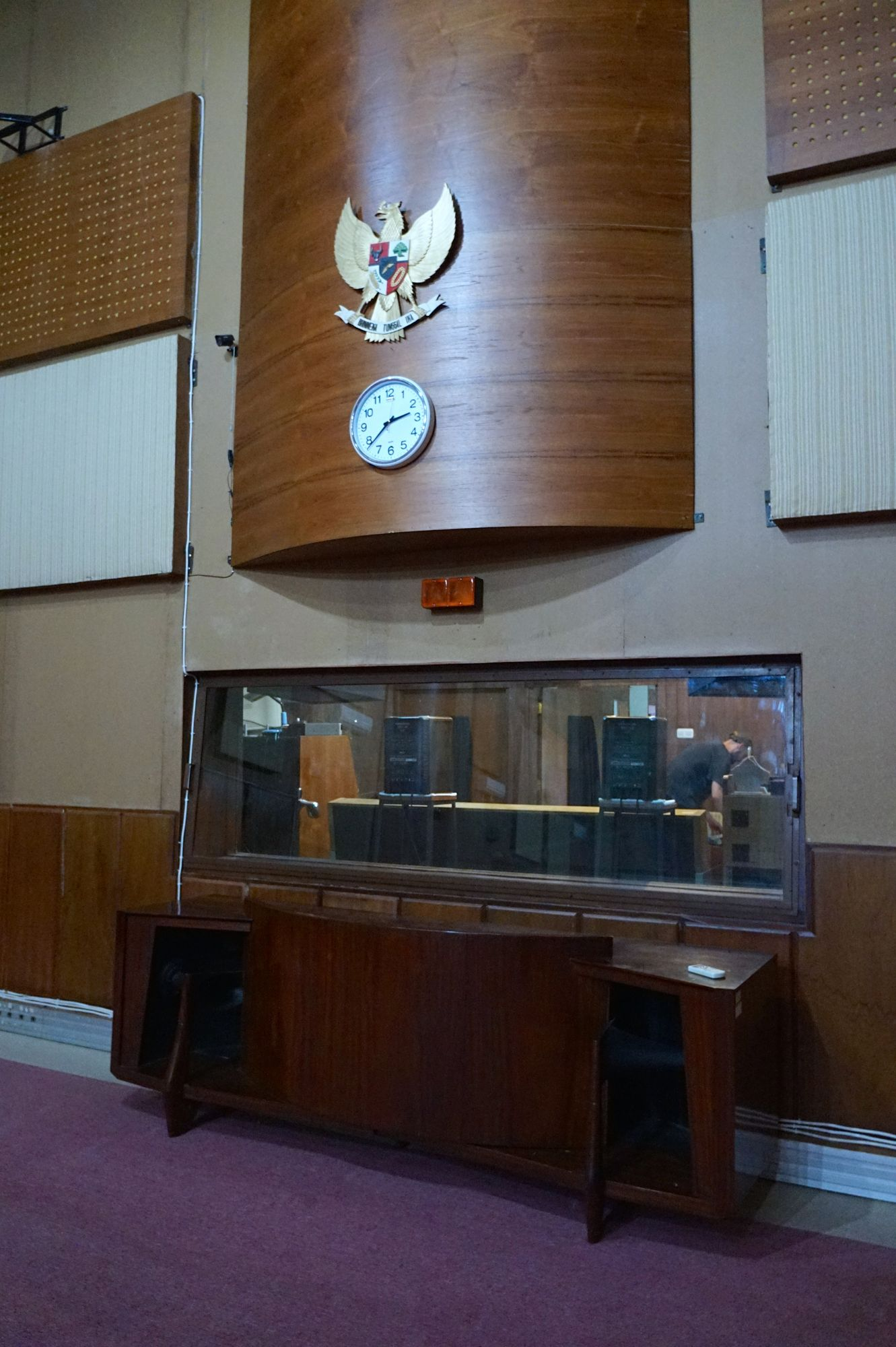
Lokananta Studio.A

After the bankruptcy of 2001, Lokananta has been trying to renovate its image, working on the recording of new musical genres and on the re-mastering of its archive on physical supports like CDs, DVDs and WAV files: nineteen people still work there and Lokananta's main income is now the rental fee of some futsal space they were forced to create in the past three years.

The record of the Maluku's song was given to the 1962 Asian Games contingent (in the form of compilation Asian Games: Souvenir From Indonesia).

== See also ==
- National Press Monument

== Bibliography ==
- Yampolsky, Philip; Lokananta: a discography of the National Recording Company of Indonesia, 1957-1985 Center for Southeast Asian Studies, University of Wisconsin, 1987
