= Black Brothers =

Black Brothers was a West Papuan pop group from Jayapura. The band consisted of five members, led by Andy Ayamiseba. Their music, sung in Tok Pisin, and originally in Indonesian, included influences from reggae and political elements inspired by the Black Power movement. The group went into voluntary exile in Vanuatu in 1979, protesting Indonesian policies in West Papua. They later moved to Papua New Guinea.

Black Brothers were the most popular musical group in New Guinea during the 1980s. The reggae influences of the Black Brothers influenced various other musical groups in Papua New Guinea.
