= Oslan Husein =

Minangkabau actor and singer (1931–1972)

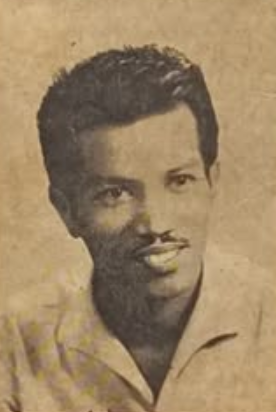
- Oslan in the 1950s
- Born: April 8, 1931; Padang, Dutch East Indies
- Died: August 16, 1972 (aged 41); Jakarta, Indonesia
- Occupations: Singer, actor
- Years active: 1948–1971

Oslan Husein (8 April 1931 – 16 August 1972) was an Indonesian actor and singer of Minangkabau origin. He's well known in the 50s for singing and popularising Minangkabau songs such as Ayam Den Lapeh (lit. 'My Chicken Ran Away'), Kampuang Nan Jauh Di Mato (lit. 'The Faraway Hometown'), and Tak Tontong (lit. 'Bang Dum-Dum'), as well as for his songs such as Tahu Tempe (lit. 'Tofu, Tempeh'), Menimbang Rasa (lit. 'Weighing Feelings'), and Lebaran (lit. 'Eid al-Fitr').

On 1 December 2009, his cover of Bengawan Solo with his orchestra, Teruna Ria, was ranked 11th on Rolling Stone Indonesia's "150 Best Indonesian Songs of All Time".
