= Bing Slamet =

Indonesian musician and actor (1927–1974)

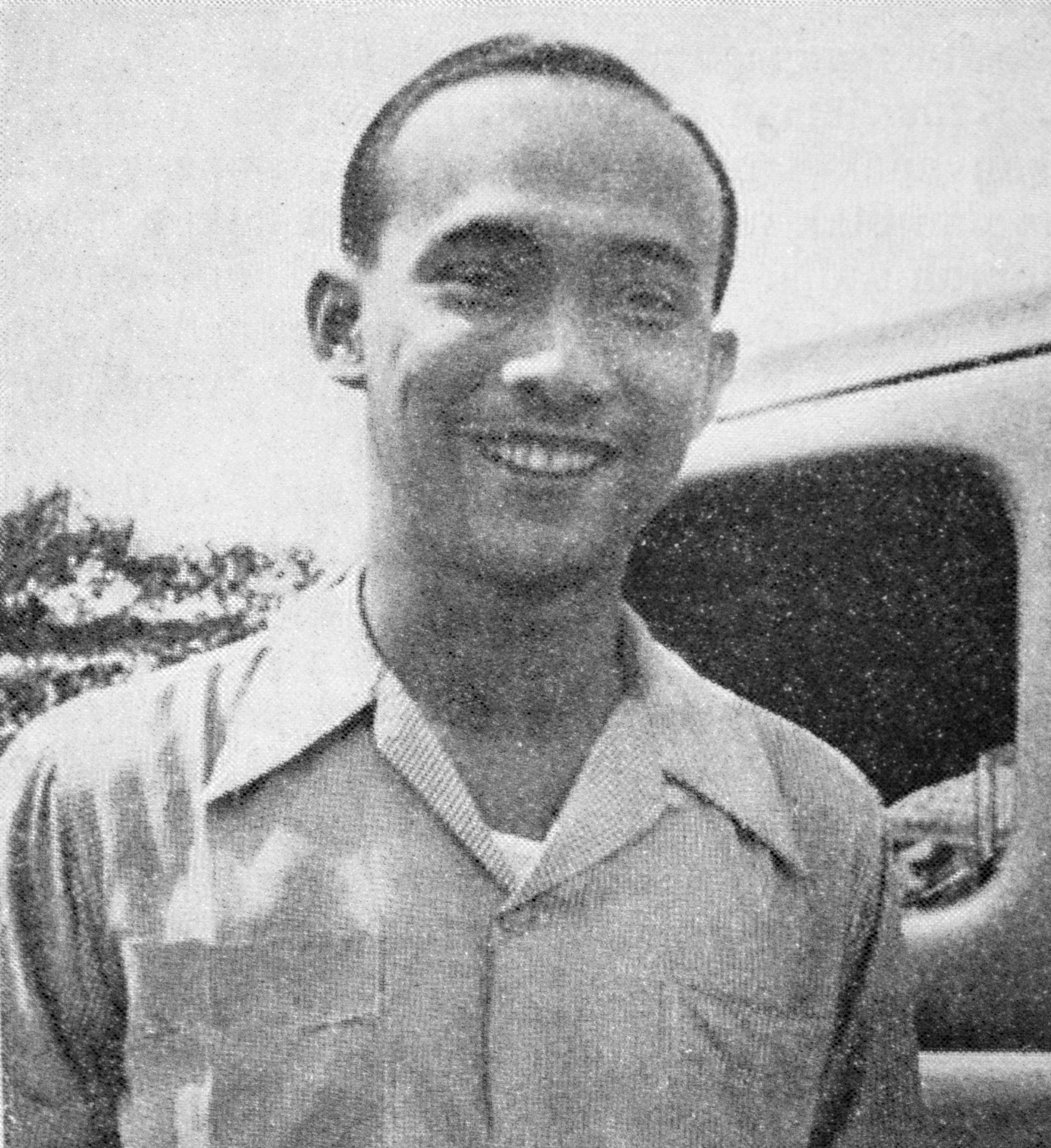
- Bing Slamet in 1954

Background information
- Born: Ahmad Syech Albar; 27 September 1927; Cilegon, Dutch East Indies
- Died: 17 December 1974 (aged 47) Jakarta, Indonesia
- Occupations: Singer, songwriter, comedian, actor
- Instrument: Guitar
- Years active: 1939–1974
- Formerly of: Eka Sapta

Ahmad Syech Albar (27 September 1927 – 17 December 1974), better known by his stage name Bing Slamet, was an Indonesian singer, songwriter, comedian, and actor. During his career, he acted in 17 films and released "dozens" of albums. Shortly before his death, he received a lifetime achievement award from the Governor of Jakarta. Three of his songs were chosen by Rolling Stone Indonesia as some of the best Indonesian songs of all time.

== Biography ==
Ahmad Syech Albar was born in Cilegon, West Java (today in Banten province) on 27 September 1927 to Rintrik Achmad and his wife. As a child he was known as a class clown, often joking and winking. Although his father wanted him to be a doctor or an engineer, Albar decided to be an entertainer. At the age of twelve he began singing in the Terang Boelan orchestra in 1939. In 1944, he joined the Pantja Warna stage group and travelled through Yogyakarta, Malang and Surabaya.

Albar took the name Bing Slamet in 1948 as a tribute to Bing Crosby, whom he respected; Bing was a reference to Crosby, and Slamet was his own nickname. Aside from singing, he also began to participate in comedy, forming the "Los Gilos" comic group together with Tjepot and Udel. On 29 July 1953, he won a comedy competition in the Jakarta Art Building, which gave him the nickname "Bintang Pelawak" ("Star of Comedians"), and two years later he was chosen as the best radio entertainer by the Radio Republik Indonesia branch in Jakarta. He eventually came on friendly terms with then-President Sukarno.

Aside from comedy, Slamet also was active in acting and songwriting. In 1949 he performed in his first film, Mohammad Said Hamid Junid's Menanti Kasih (Waiting for my Love). His first starring role was in 1955's Di Simpang Jalan (At the Intersection). His later movies were mainly comedies. After founding Safari Sinar Sakti Film, he used his power as a producer to become one of the first Indonesian actors with his name embedded in a film's title; this became a trend during the 1970s.

He also formed the band Eka Sapta with Yamin Widjaja, the founder of Musica Studios; together they were one of the dominant Indonesian bands in the 1960s and 70s.

During his career, he played in 17 films and "dozens" of albums. His most popular film was Bing Slamet Koboi Cengeng (Bing Slamet the Crybaby Cowboy), which was seen by 530 thousand people during its initial run in 1974.

== Personal life ==
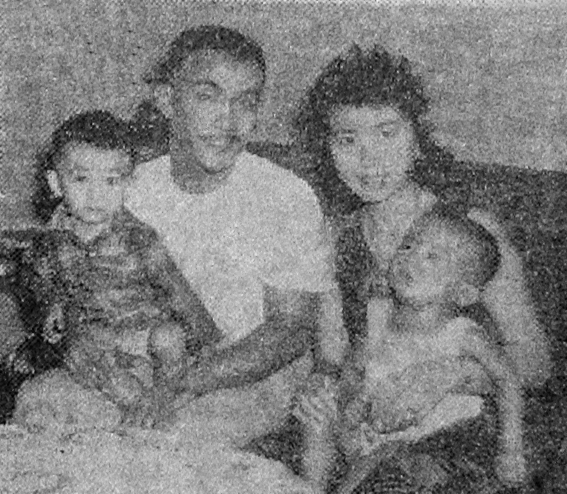
Slamet with family in 1958

Slamet married R. Ratna Kamala Furi on 23 April 1956. Together they had eight children, two daughters and six sons. Three of those children went on to be entertainers.

== Death ==
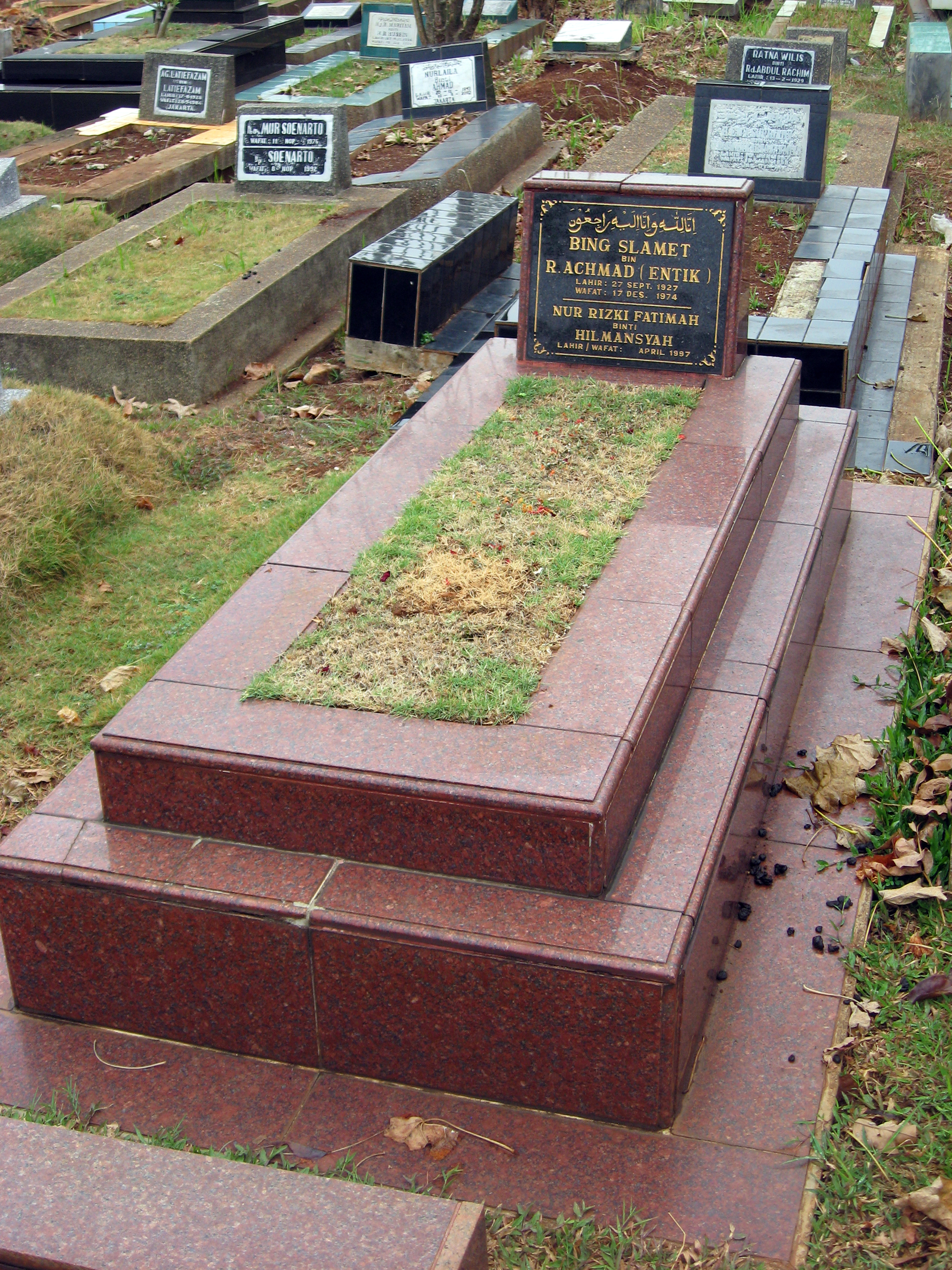
Bing Slamet's grave at Karet Bivak cemetery in Jakarta

Slamet died on 17 December 1974 at his friend's house in Jakarta of liver cancer. His funeral procession stretched for more than 4 kilometres (2.5 mi), and was attended by thousands. He is buried in Karet Bivak cemetery, Central Jakarta.

== Accolades and awards ==
In 1972, then-Governor of Jakarta Ali Sadikin gave Slamet a lifetime achievement award for his musical career. After Slamet's death, Titiek Puspa wrote "Bing" in 30 minutes on the airplane she was riding as a tribute to him. Rolling Stone Indonesia noted that Puspa was clearly emotionally devastated by his death. In 2003, Slamet was awarded the Budaya Parama Dharma medal. It was accepted by his son Hilmansyah.

In 2009, Rolling Stone Indonesia listed three of Slamet's songs on their list of the 150 best Indonesian songs of all time. His cover of Ismail Marzuki's song "Payung Fantasi" ("Fantasy Umbrella") was ranked 70th, with the magazine praising Slamet's vocals. His cover of "Gendjer-Gendjer", written by the Lekra-affiliated M. Arif, was ranked 105th; it was noted as being popular during the later years of Sukarno's rule, but deliberately ignored during Suharto's New Order regime. "Nurlela", the title track from Slamet's film Bing Slamet Tukang Becak (Bing Slamet the Pedicab Driver), was ranked 118th. "Bing" was ranked 41st.

Slamet has been noted as directly or indirectly influencing numerous entertainers who followed him. His frequent collaborators Puspa and Benyamin Sueb learned from his experience and used it to further their own careers; Puspa has noted that meeting Slamet was the reason she entered singing, and Sueb is buried not far from Slamet. His songs have been covered by singers such as Glenn Fredly and Ruth Sahanaya.

== Works ==
=== Filmography ===
- Menanti Kasih (Waiting for My Love; 1951)
- Solo di Waktu Malam (Solo at Night; 1952)
- Di Simpang Jalan (At the Intersection; 1955)
- Radja Karet dari Singapura (The Rubber King from Singapore; 1956)
- Melati Senja (Twilight Jasmine; 1956)
- Pilihlah Aku (Choose Me; 1956)
- Tiga Buronan (Three Fugitives; 1957)
- Hari Libur (Holiday; 1958)
- Nurlela, Diwajahmu Kulihat Bulan (Nurlela, In Your Face I See the Moon; 1959)
- Bing Slamet Tukang Becak (Bing Slamet the Pedicab Driver; 1959)
- Amor dan Humor (Love and Humour; 1961)
- Kisah Pelawak (A Comedian's Tale; 1961)
- Bing Slamet Merantau (Bing Slamet Wanders; 1962)
- Hantjurnja Petualang (The Fall of an Explorer; 1966)
- Bunga Putih (White Flower; 1966)
- Juda Saba Desa (Juda Frequents the Village; 1967)
- 2 x 24 Jam (2 x 24 Hours; 1967)
- Bing Slamet Setan Jalan (Bing Slamet the Walking Demon; 1972)
- Ambisi (Ambition; 1973)
- Bing Slamet Sibuk (Bing Slamet is Busy; 1973)
- Bing Slamet Dukun Palsu (Bing Slamet the Fake Witch-Doctor; 1973)
- Bing Slamet Koboi Cengeng (Bing Slamet the Crybaby Cowboy; 1974)

=== Partial discography ===
- Menanti Kasih (Waiting for Love)
- Nurlaila
- Keroncong Moritsu
- Es Lilin / Panon Hideung (Ice Cream / Panon Hideung)
- Bing Slamet Tersayang (Beloved Bing Slamet)
- Romi dan Juliet (Romi and Juliet)
