= Acehnese phonology =

Language phonology

A trio of Acehnese speakers.

The phonology of Acehnese varies between dialects and can cause difficulties in communication. This article mainly focuses on the Peusangan dialect, which is considered to be the standard variety of Acehnese, other dialects will be explicitly mentioned.

== Consonants ==
The table below shows the Acehnese consonant phonemes and the range of their realizations, non-standard phonemes are shown in brackets.

		Labial	Denti-alveolar	Alveolar	Post-alveolar	Palatal	Velar	Glottal
Nasal	plain	m		n		ɲ	ŋ	
Nasal	post-oralized	(mᵇ) (Note: In the northern dialects of Aceh (North Acehnese, Greater Acehnese), the nasals /m/, /n/, /ɲ/, /ŋ/ are realized as post-oralized nasals (also called "funny nasals") before oral vowels and consonants. They are distinct from the nasal–plosive sequences /mb/, /nd/, /ɲɟ/, /ŋɡ/, e.g. in [banᵈa] 'port' vs [mandum] 'all'. Outside of the northern dialects, post-oralized nasals are absent, as observed in the West Acehnese dialects, where they are treated as nasal–plosive sequences, compare North Acehnese nggang, 'hornbill' [ŋᶢaŋ] with West Acehnese eunggang [ɯŋ.ɡaŋ] or nggang [ŋ.ɡaŋ].)		(nᵈ)		(ɲᶡ)	(ŋᶢ)	
Plosive	voiceless	p			t̠ (Note: The stop /t/ is realised as a postalveolar stop [t̠]. Budiman Sulaiman observed /d/ as postalveolar as well.)	c	k	ʔ (Note: The phoneme /ʔ/ is represented with ⟨k⟩ word finally, and unwritten word initially and medially.)
Plosive	voiced	b		d		ɟ	ɡ	
Fricative		(f) (Note: The phoneme /f/ is not native in Acehnese and is borrowed from Arabic. While Asyik describes the /f/ phoneme as a labio-dental, Zulfadli argues that there is no /f/ in Acehnese, stating instead that /f/ and /v/ from loanwords are nativised into /p/, Durie also does not include /f/ as an Acehnese phoneme.)	s (Note: In most dialects of Acehnese, the fricative /s/ is pronounced as a voiceless denti-alveolar sibilant [s̻̪]. As described by Durie, the phoneme /s/ is realised as "a laminal alveo-dental fricative with a wide channel area". Snouck Hurgronje used the grapheme ⟨tʰ⟩ to represent the phoneme /s/ in his orthography of Acehnese due to its similarity to English's [θ]. The fricative has also been described as a plain voiceless dental sibilant /θ/.)			(ʃ) (Note: The phoneme /ʃ/ only natively occurs in onomatopoeias, such as husy, 'to shoo an animal away' /huʃ/, or as realisations of /c/ and /cʰ/, such as syeuruga, 'heaven' /ʃɯruɡa/ compared to standard ceuruga /cɯruɡa/. Non-native /ʃ/ mostly comes from Arabic loans and is often nativised as /c/, /cʰ/, or /s/.)		h
Approximant				l		j	w	
Trill				r				

=== Consonant examples ===
The following table shows typical examples of the occurrence of the above consonant phonemes in words, using minimal pairs where possible.

Fortis			Lenis		
/p/	peuet	four	/b/	beuet	to read
/t/	teuka	to arrive	/d/	deuka	to be lucky
/c/	cap	stamp	/ɟ/	jap	tight, closely
/k/	kôt	coat	/ɡ/	gôt	to pull
/s/	sue	waste			
/h/	hue	to pull			
/ʔ/	ue	to have a blockage in the throat			
			/m/	mom	breast
			/n/	nom	to dive
			/ɲ/	nyum	feelings
			/ŋ/	ngom	reed
			/l/	lèh	suffix to indicate a polite request
			/r/	rèe	a roaring sound
			/w/	wèe	Arabic letter waw
			/j/	yèe	shark

=== Clusters ===
Acehnese has three consonant glides: /h/, /r/, and /l/.

	p	t	c	k	b	d	ɟ	g	l	r	s	ɲ	m	n
_h (Note: The consonant /h/ clusters are heard as aspirated [pʰ, tʰ, cʰ, kʰ] or murmured [bʱ, dʱ, ɟʱ, ɡʱ, lʱ, rʱ].)	ph (Note: The phoneme /pʰ/ is often articulated as the affricate /ɸ/, similar to how Asyik observes Acehnese /f/.)	th	ch	kh	bh	dh	ɟh	gh	lh	rh		ɲh	(mh) (Note: In the northern parts of Blang Bintang dan Montasiek, the clusters /mh/ and /nh/ can also be found.)	(nh)
_r	pr	tr	cr	kr	br	dr	ɟr	gr			(sr) (Note: /sr/ is observed by Cowan in the dialects of Tunong and Pidie. /sr/ replaces the consonant cluster /rʱ/.)			
_l	pl		cl	kl	bl			(ɟl) (Note: In several dialects, they distinct between clusters /ɟl/ and /gl/.)	gl					

== Vowels ==
Native-speaking linguists divide vowels in Acehnese into several categories: oral monophthongs, oral diphthongs (which are further divided into the ones ending with /ə/ and with /i/), nasal monophthongs, and nasal diphthongs.

=== Oral vowels ===
Oral monophthong vowels in Acehnese are shown in the table below.

	Front	Central	Back
Close	i	ɯ	u
Close-mid	e	ə	o
Open-mid	ɛ	ʌ	ɔ
Open		a	

Oral diphthong vowels ending with /ə/ are shown in the table below.

Front	Central	Back
/iə/	/ɯə/	/uə/
/ɛə/	/ʌə/	/ɔə/

Oral diphthong vowels ending with /i/ are shown in the table below.

Central	Back
	/ui/
/əi/	/oi/
/ʌi/	/ɔi/
/ai/	

=== Nasal vowels ===
Nasal monophthong vowels in Acehnese are shown in the table below.

	Front	Central	Back
Close	ĩ	ɯ̃	ũ
Open-mid	ɛ̃	ʌ̃	ɔ̃
Open		ã	

== Orthography ==
The Acehnese orthography features 31 letters: the 26 letters of the basic Latin alphabet, è, é, ë, ô, and ö.

Vowels
Grapheme	Phoneme (IPA)	Open syllable	Closed syllable
a	/a/	ba /ba/ ‘carry’	bak /baʔ/ ‘at, tree’
e	/ə/	le /lə/ ‘many’	let /lət/ ‘pull out’
é	/e/	baté /bate/ ‘cup, betel tray’	baték /bateʔ/ ‘batik’
è	/ɛ/	bèe /bɛə/ ‘smell’	bèk /bɛʔ/ ‘prohibitive "don't" (e.g. bèk neupajôh boh gantang teucrôh lôn 'don't you eat my fries')'
eu	/ɯ/	keu /kɯ/ ‘for’	keuh /kɯh/ ‘so (e.g. nyan keuh), pronominal affix for second person (e.g. droe-keuh)’
i	/i/	di /di/ 'in, from'	dit /dit/ 'few, small amount'
o	/ɔ/	yo /jɔ/ ‘afraid’	yok /jɔʔ/ ‘shake’
ô	/o/	rô /ro/ ‘spill’	rôh /roh/ ‘enter’
ö	/ʌ/	pö /pʌ/ ‘fly’	pöt /pʌt/ ‘pluck, pick’
u	/u/	su /su/ ‘sound, voice’	cut /cut/ ‘small’

== Bibliography ==
- Lawler, John M. (1977). "A Agrees with B in Achenese: A Problem for Relational Grammar". In Cole, P.; Sacock, J. (eds.). Grammatical Relations. Syntax and Semantics 8. New York: Academic Press. pp. 219–248. doi:10.1163/9789004368866_010.
- Sulaiman, Budiman (1977). Bahasa Aceh [The Acehnese Language] (PDF) (in Indonesian). Vol. 1. Banda Aceh.
- Cowan, H. K. J. (1981). "An Outline of Achehnese Phonology and Morphology". Bulletin of the School of Oriental and African Studies. 44 (3): 522–549.
- Asyik, Abdul Gani (1982). "The Agreement System in Acehnese" (PDF). Mon-Khmer Studies. 11: 1–33. Archived from the original (PDF) on 20 February 2012.
- Durie, Mark (1984). A grammar of Acehnese (PhD thesis). Australian National University. doi:10.25911/5d6fa25bcc31c. hdl:1885/138059.
- Asyik, Abdul Gani (1987). A Contextual Grammar of Acehnese Sentences (PDF) (PhD thesis). The University of Michigan. Archived from the original on 24 July 2011.
- Daud, Bukhari; Durie, Mark (1999). Kamus Basa Aceh [Acehnese-Indonesian-English Thesaurus] (PDF). C (in English, Indonesian, and Acehnese). Vol. 151. Canberra: Pacific Linguistics. ISBN 0 85883 506 1.
- Wildan (2010). Kaidah Bahasa Aceh [The Principles of the Acehnese Language] (PDF) (in Indonesian) (1st ed.). Banda Aceh: Geuci. ISBN 978-979-96655-3-9.
- Pillai, Stefanie; Yusuf, Yunisrina Qismullah (2012). "An Instrumental Analysis of Acehnese Oral Vowels" (PDF). Language and Linguistics. 13 (6): 1029–1050. Archived from the original (PDF) on 11 October 2017.
- Zulfadli (2014). A Sociolinguistic Investigation of Acehnese with a Focus on West Acehnese: A Stigmatised Dialect (Bachelor of Education thesis). University of Adelaide.
- Muthalib, Kismullah Abdul (2017). Dialect features of Leupueng children: a study of dialect in post tsunami Aceh (PhD thesis). Syiah Kuala University.
