= West Acehnese dialect =

Dialect of Acehnese

West Acehnese
- Dialek Aceh Barat
- A map of the dialects of Acehnese. The West Aceh dialect is shown in red.
- Native to: Indonesia
- Region: Western coast of Aceh
- Native speakers: 540,000 (2010)
- Language family: Austronesian: Acehnese; West Acehnese

Language codes
- ISO 639-3: –
- Glottolog: None

The West Acehnese dialect is a dialect of Acehnese spoken on the southwestern coast regencies of Aceh, which mainly includes the regencies of West Aceh, Nagan Raya, Southwest Aceh, and South Aceh. West Aceh is one of the five major dialects of Acehnese. The West Acehnese dialect is referred to with various names, which includes the Meulaboh dialect, the Southwest dialect, and the Tunong dialect.

The West Acehnese dialect is mostly intelligible to Standard Acehnese or North Acehnese speakers, with the major difficulties being vocabulary.

== Phonology ==
=== Consonants ===
West Acehnese Consonants
		Labial	Alveolar	Palatal	Dorsal	Glottal
Nasal		m	n	ɲ	ŋ	
Plosive	voiceless	p	t̠	c	k	ʔ
Plosive	voiced	b	d	ɟ	ɡ	
Fricative			s ([s̻̪])		ʁ	h
Approximant			l	j	w	

=== Vowels ===
	Front		Central		Back	
	oral	nasal	oral	nasal	oral	nasal
Close	i	ĩ	ɯ	ɯ̃	u	ũ
Close-mid	e	ɛ̃	ə	ʌ̃	o	ɔ̃
Open-mid	ɛ	ɛ̃	ʌ	ʌ̃	ɔ	ɔ̃
Open			a	ã		

== Bibliography ==
- Zulfadli (2014). A Sociolinguistic Investigation of Acehnese with a Focus on West Acehnese: A Stigmatised Dialect (Bachelor of Education thesis). University of Adelaide.
- Rizki, Azrul; Junaidi, Teuku (19 August 2020). Pengantar Pembelajaran Bahasa Daerah Aceh (in Indonesian). Langsa: Bina Karya Akademika. ISBN 978-602-5919-59-6.
- Sartika, Dina (2023). "Varieties of Language in North Acehnese and West Acehnese". English Language and Literature International Conference. 6 (1).
- Asyik, Abdul Gani (1987). A Contextual Grammar of Acehnese Sentences (PDF) (PhD thesis). The University of Michigan. Archived from the original on 2011-07-24.
