= Acehnese =

Acehnese or Achinese may refer to:

- Acehnese people, an ethnic group inhabiting Aceh, Sumatra
- Acehnese language, the language spoken by the Acehnese people

== See also ==
- Aceh, a province of Sumatra, Indonesia
