= Acehnese orthography =

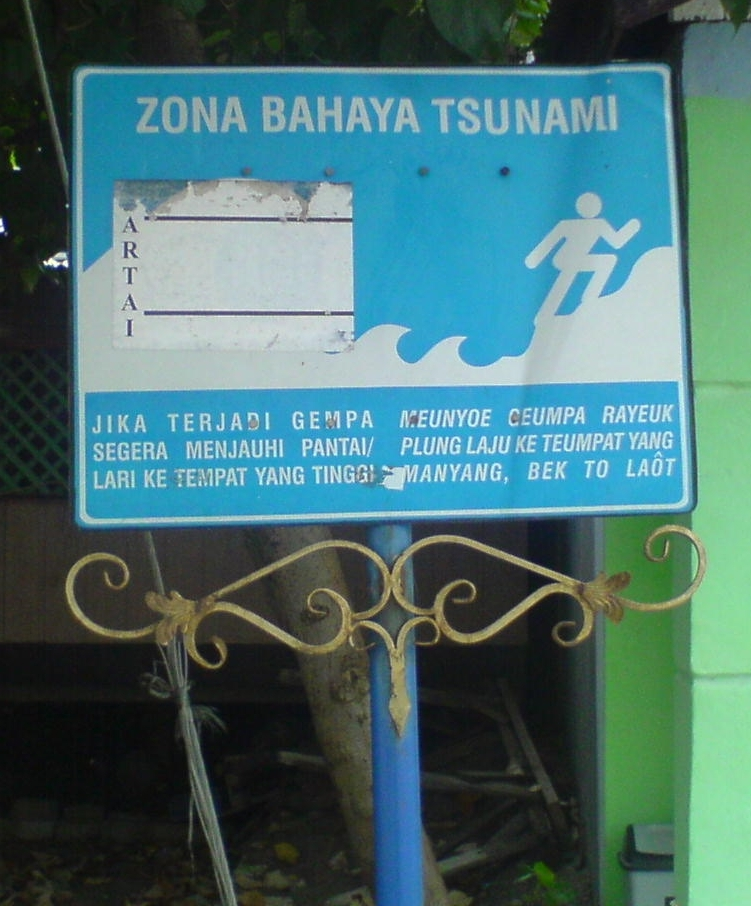
Bilingual tsunami warning sign in Indonesian and Acehnese, written in the EBAYD spelling

Acehnese orthography refers to the writing systems and spelling conventions of the Acehnese language, which is a co-official language of the province of Aceh, Indonesia. Acehnese is generally written in the Latin script. The Acehnese language is officially standardised and regulated within the qanun of Aceh. However, the qanun does not specify which spelling standard should be used, and no consensus has been reached on the matter.

The most widely used spelling standard for Acehnese is the Enhanced Spelling of the Acehnese Language (Ejaan Bahasa Aceh yang Disempurnakan, EBAYD). This article focuses primarily on EBAYD, while other spelling systems will also be described.

== Spelling standards ==
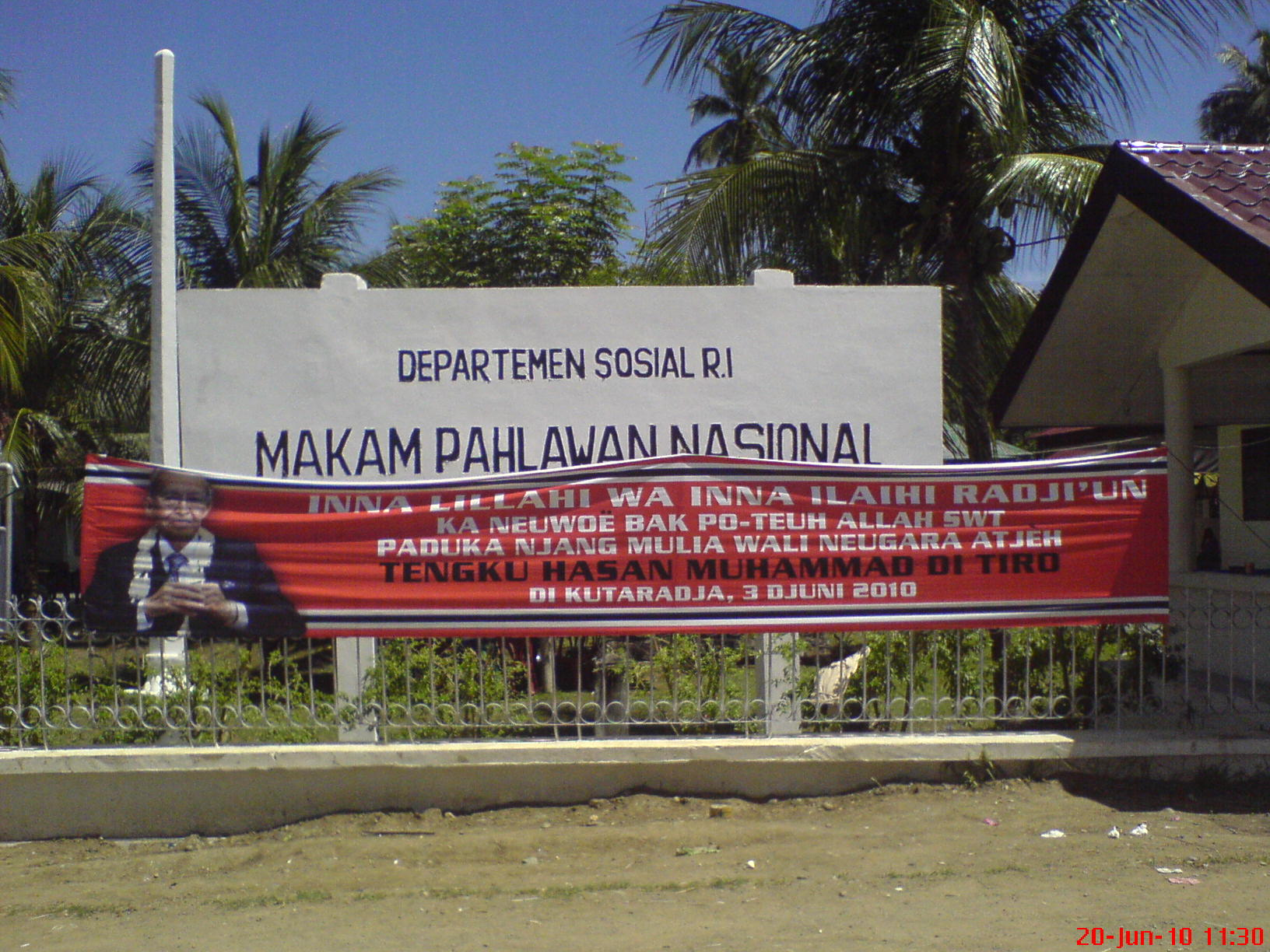
A banner announcing the death of Hasan di Tiro in Acehnese, written in the Husaini spelling and in the style of the Bintang Buleuen flag, illustrating the association between the Husaini spelling system and GAM.

The Acehnese language has two coexisting spelling standards, EBAYD and Husaini.

EBAYD, also referred to as the Unsyiah Spelling System (Ejaan Unsyiah) or the Campus Spelling System (Ejaan Kampus), was developed at Syiah Kuala University in Banda Aceh in 1980 to standardise and codify Acehnese orthography. It is widely regarded as the de facto standard spelling of Acehnese, used in dictionaries and learning materials.

An alternative to EBAYD is the Husaini Spelling System (Ejaan Husaini). It is prevalent among former Free Aceh Movement (GAM) members, pro-independence groups, and Acehnese refugees abroad. These groups avoid EBAYD because of its association with the Soeharto regime. The system is also colloquially known as the GAM spelling system (Ejaan GAM), reflecting its historical and continued use among former GAM members.

EBAYD is based on the Enhanced Spelling System of Indonesian while Husaini is based on the Soewandi Spelling System. Both spelling systems employ similar diacritics to distinguish vowel sounds, following the system used by Snouck Hurgronje. (Note: Although the current diacritics are largely based on Snouck's system, his orthography does not distinguish between /ʌ/ and /ɔ/. This is because the dialect he studied had merged these phonemes, whereas most dialects of Aceh retain the distinction. Additionally, spelling systems that use diacritics are often referred to as "Snouck's Spelling.") A distinction between EBAYD and Husaini is the glyph ⟨ë⟩, which EBAYD treats as an archaic variant of ⟨e⟩ and no longer uses. Another distinct feature of both spelling systems is how they represent palatal sounds. EBAYD uses the graphemes c, j, ny, y, and sy from the Enhanced Spelling System, whereas Husaini uses tj, dj, nj, j, and sj, respectively, following the Soewandi Spelling System.

Calls for a unified spelling standard have been made by Acehnese scholars and linguists. Teuku Abdullah Sakti argued that writers had adopted varying spelling conventions in the absence of a common reference. He urges the Aceh government to unify Acehnese spelling conventions, arguing that previous seminars and discussions had failed to establish an effective reference and lacked official enforcement. Wildan similarly urged the Aceh government to prioritise spelling standardisation and formalise an agreed standard through regional regulation. He also called for the standardisation of Acehnese terminology and vocabulary.

== Alphabet ==
The standard spelling system uses 21 basic Latin letters and four additional letters with diacritics:

Majuscule forms (uppercase)
| A | B | C | D | E | É | È | G | H | I | J | K | L | M | N | O | Ô | Ö | P | R | S | T | U | W | Y |
Minuscule forms (lowercase)
| a | b | c | d | e | é | è | g | h | i | j | k | l | m | n | o | ô | ö | p | r | s | t | u | w | y |
IPA
| a | b | c | d | ə | e | ɛ | ɡ | h | i | ɟ | k, ʔ | l | m | n | ɔ | o | ʌ | p | r | s | t̠ | u | w | j |

Alongside the letters above, Acehnese also has three digraphs: eu /ɯ/, ng /ŋ/, and ny /ɲ/. Additionally, the grapheme ⟨k⟩ represents /ʔ/ at the end of a syllable. Aspirated and murmured consonants are indicated with the glyph ⟨h⟩ placed after the consonant.

Acehnese also features vowel nasalisation, which is marked with an apostrophe ⟨’⟩ preceding the vowel.

=== Non-standard letters ===
The letters F, Q, V, X, and Z, along with the digraphs KH (Note: Not to be confused with the sequence kh /kʰ/) and SY, are not officially a part of the Acehnese alphabet, although these letters can still be found in both colloquial and formal texts.

F and SY occur in dialectal speech and loanwords, such as faké (lit. 'poor') and dèsya (lit. 'sin'). However, their inclusion in the Acehnese alphabet remains debated. Q, Z, and KH are mainly used in Arabic loanwords. V and X are rarely seen in Acehnese writing, with few exceptions such as the regency of Meuraxa (also spelt as Meuraksa) in Banda Aceh. In general, loanwords are adapted to Acehnese phonology.

| Grapheme | Phoneme | | | Original Word | Indonesian | Malay | Acehnese | |
| Grapheme | Original (IPA) | Nativised | | Original Word | Indonesian | Malay | Acehnese | |
| Grapheme | Original (IPA) | IPA | Glyph | Original Word | Indonesian | Malay | EBAYD | Husaini |
|---|---|---|---|---|---|---|---|---|
| f | /f/ | /p/ | p | Dutch: fabriek | pabrik | | pabrék | |
| f | /f/ | /pʰ/ | ph | Arabic: كافر, romanized: kāfir | kafir | kafir | kaphé | |
| kh | /x/ | /h/ | h | Arabic: الخميس, romanized: al-Khamīs | Kamis | Khamis | Hamèh | |
| kh | /x/ | /k/ | k | Arabic: خصوص, romanized: khuṣūṣ | khusus | khusus | kusuih | |
| kh | /x/ | /kʰ/ | kh | Arabic: خلاف, romanized: khilāf | khilaf | khilaf | khileueh | khileuëh |
| q | /q/ | /k/ | k | Arabic: القرآن, romanized: al-Qur’ān | Quran | Quran | Kuruan | |
| sy | /ʃ/ | /c/ | c / tj | Arabic: شريعة, romanized: sharīʿah | syariat | syariat | cari’at | tjari’at |
| sy | /ʃ/ | /cʰ/ | ch / tjh | Arabic: شرك, romanized: shirk | syirik | syirik | chirék | tjhirék |
| sy | /ʃ/ | /s/ | s | Arabic: شاعر, romanized: shāʿir | syair | syair | caé | |
| v | /v/ | /b/ | b | Dutch: gouverneur | gubenur | | gobeuno | |
| v | /v/ | /p/ | p | Dutch: civiel | sipil | | sipé | |
| z | /z/ | /d/ | d | Arabic: زيتون, romanized: zaytūn | zaitun | zaitun | doitun | |
| z | /z/ | /ɟ/ | j / dj | Persian: زمان, romanized: zamân | zaman | zaman | jameun | djameun |

== History ==
Following the introduction of the Arabic script through Malay, Acehnese developed into a literary language, although literacy was mostly restricted to scholars and royal courts. Since the Dutch colonial period, particularly after World War II and Indonesia's independence, Acehnese has been written in the Latin script, and Jawoe has largely fallen out of use.

=== Jawoe ===
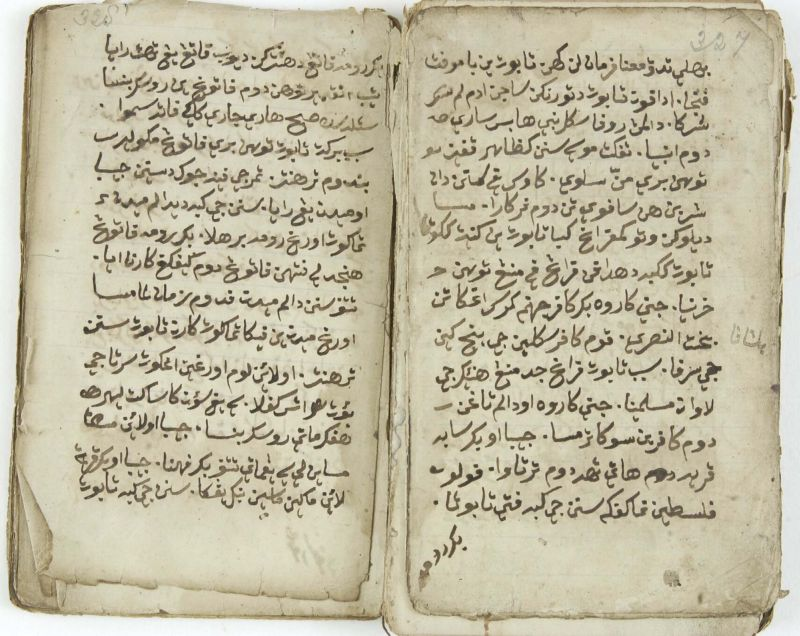
Hikayat Prang Sabi, an Acehnese epic written in the Jawoe spelling

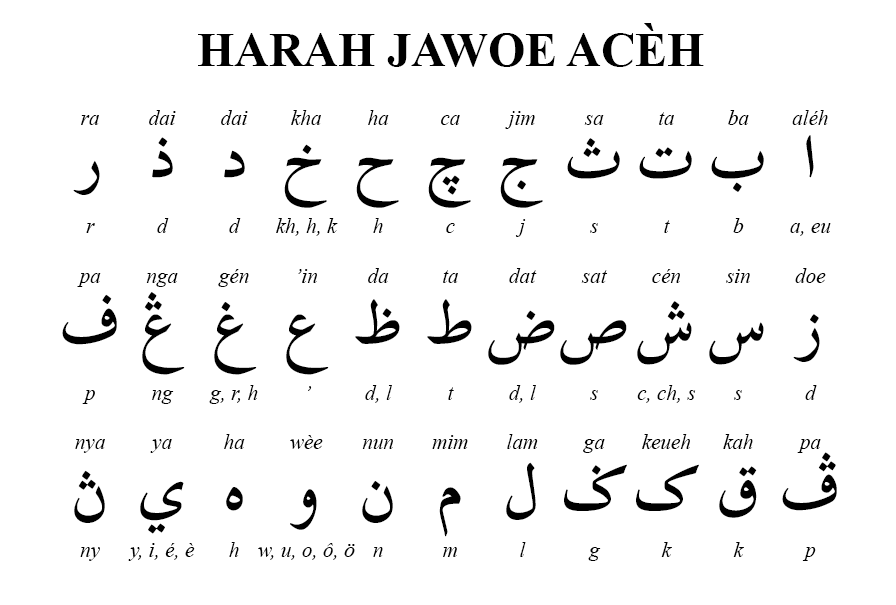
The Malay Jawi was adopted to write Acehnese

Historically, Acehnese was written in an Arabic script called Jawoe (جاوي; pronounced [ɟa.ˈwɔə̯]), a modified variant of Jawi. Originally, Jawi was adopted to write Malay, which served as a language of the court. Most texts in Aceh were therefore written in Malay Jawi. At the time, Acehnese was used primarily as a spoken language.

Jawoe, also called Acehnese Jawoe, is not a phonetic writing system. Jawoe functions similarly to a heterogramic system, in which a word retains its original Malay or Arabic spelling but is read as its Acehnese equivalent. Acehnese also has 34 distinct vowel sounds. The Arabic script, an abjad writing system, cannot adequately represent all of them.

| Word | Jawoë | Literal Transliteration | Malay | Acehnese | | |
| Word | Jawoë | Literal Transliteration | Malay | EBAYD | Husaini | IPA |
Directly taken from Arabic
| intent | مقصود | mqṣwd | maksud | meukeusud | | [mɯ.kɯ.s̻̪ut̠̚] |
| obedient | طاعة | ṭaʕt | taat | ta’at | | [t̠a.ʔãt̠̚] |
| fate | تقدير | tqdyr | takdir | teukeudi | | [t̠ɯ.kɯ.di] |
Directly taken from Jawi
| to test | اوجي | ʔwjy | uji | ujoe | udjoë | [u.ɟɔə̯] |
| wrap | بوڠکوس | bwŋkws | bungkus | bungkôh | | [buŋ.koh] |
| pray | سمبهيڠ | smbhyŋ | sembahyang | seumayang | seumajang | [s̻̪ɯ.ma.jaŋ] |
| long | ڤاڽڠ | pnjŋ | panjang | panyang | panjang | [pa.ɳaŋ] |
Influenced by Jawi spelling conventions
| water | اير | ʔyr | air | ie | ië | [iə̯] |
| day | اوري | ʔwry | hari | uroe | uroë | [u.rɔə̯] |
| return | وال | wal | | woe | woë | [wɔə̯] |
| finish | تلس | tls | telas | lheueh | lheuëh | [lʱɯə̯h] |

=== Latin Script ===
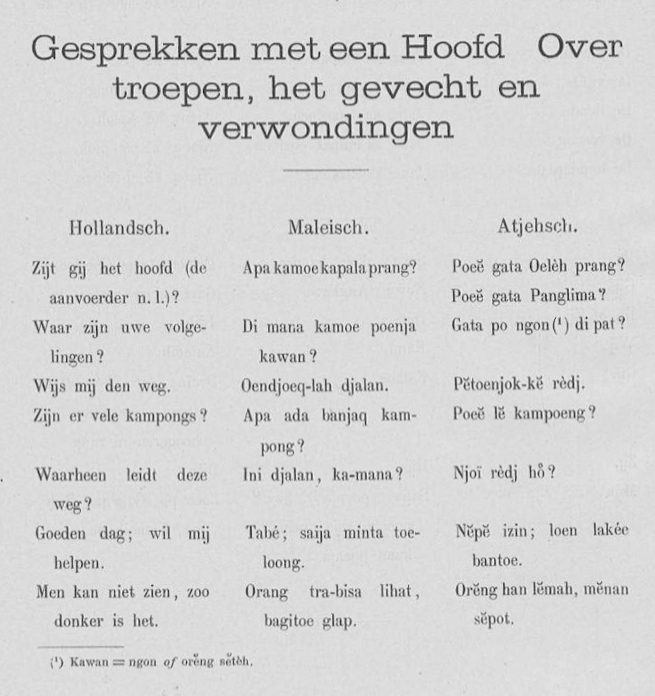
Excerpt from Poeĕ Gata Basa Atjeh? (Spreekt gij Atjehsch?), the earliest known romanisation of Acehnese

==== Early History (1888–1946) ====
The earliest known romanisation of Acehnese dates to 1888, when Hendrik August Nicolaas Catenius, a Major of the East Indies Infantry Army, published his trilingual phrase book Poeĕ Gata Basa Atjeh? (Spreekt gij Atjehsch?) (lit. 'Do You Speak Acehnese?'). The book contains phrases in Dutch, Malay, and Acehnese.

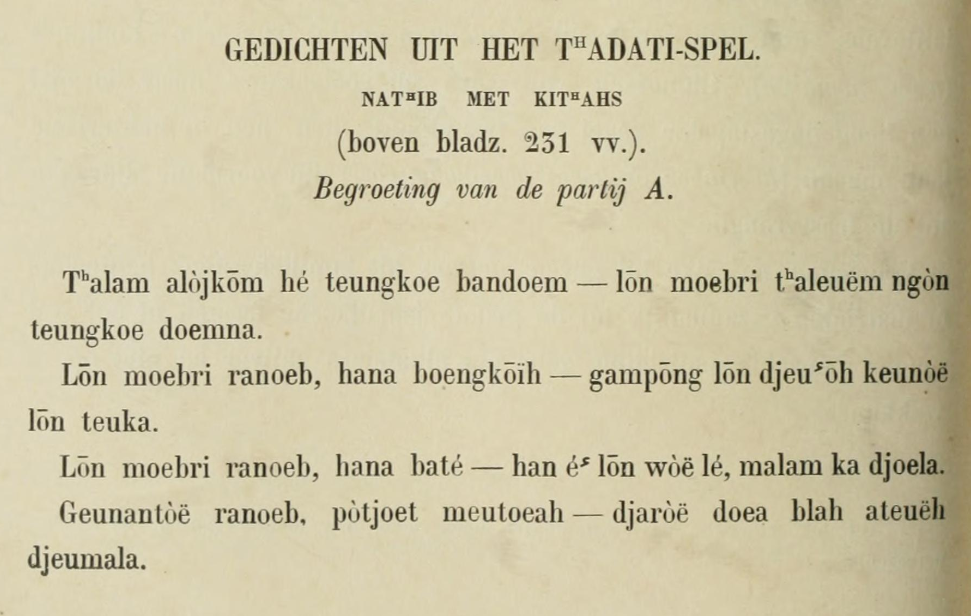
Excerpt from De Atjehers by Snouck in Acehnese

In 1891, the Netherlands government appointed Snouck Hurgronje to Aceh. During his seven-month stay, he collected numerous texts on the Acehnese language and literature. At the time, no widely used romanisation of Acehnese existed. Snouck therefore adapted the French alphabet to represent Acehnese, believing that the two languages had similar phonemic inventories.

In 1892, Snouck published Studiën over Atjèhsche Klank-en Schriftleer (lit. 'The Study of Acehnese Language and Script'), in which he described his proposed romanisation of the language. After further refining his system, he published De Atjèhers (lit. 'The Acehnese') in 1906. Since then, most Acehnese works in the Latin script have adopted his spelling conventions.

Snouck's spelling was further strengthened by Acehnese teachers and educators, including primary school teachers Mohammad Djam and Njak Tjoet, who used the spelling system in their book Batjoed Sapeue (lit. 'A Bit of Everything') to teach Acehnese children how to read, and Muhammad Saleh, who wrote Poentja (lit. 'Core') as a supplementary manual for Batjoed Sapeue. Several other literary works, such as De Vries and Aboebakar's Lhèe Saboh Nang (lit. 'The Three Siblings'), also used Snouck's spelling system.

==== Post–World War II (1946–1966) ====
For several decades, most Acehnese romanisations followed Snouck's orthography. One of the standard references used at the time was Djajadiningrat's Atjèhsch-Nederlandsch Woordenboek (lit. 'Acehnese-Dutch Dictionary'), which used a modified version of Snouck's system, though publications of the Acehnese language in the Latin script at the time were limited. Following World War II and Indonesia's independence, Acehnese orthography continued to develop, influenced by publications such as Abdullah Arif's Seumangat Atjeh (lit. 'Spirit of Aceh') and Sjèh Min Djeureula's Peunchianat Bangsa (lit. 'Betrayer of the Nation'), both published in 1946.

After World War II, changes in Acehnese orthography largely followed those in Indonesian, the national language of the newly independent Indonesia. As Indonesian underwent spelling reforms, several Acehnese writers quickly incorporated the changes into their writing. One feature that persisted was the use of diaeresis e ⟨ë⟩ to write closing diphthongs. The convention was originally adopted to distinguish the diphthong ⟨oë⟩ /ɔə̯/ from the monophthong ⟨oe⟩ /u/. This convention remained in use until the late 1970s.

==== Standardisation of the Acehnese language (1966–1980) ====
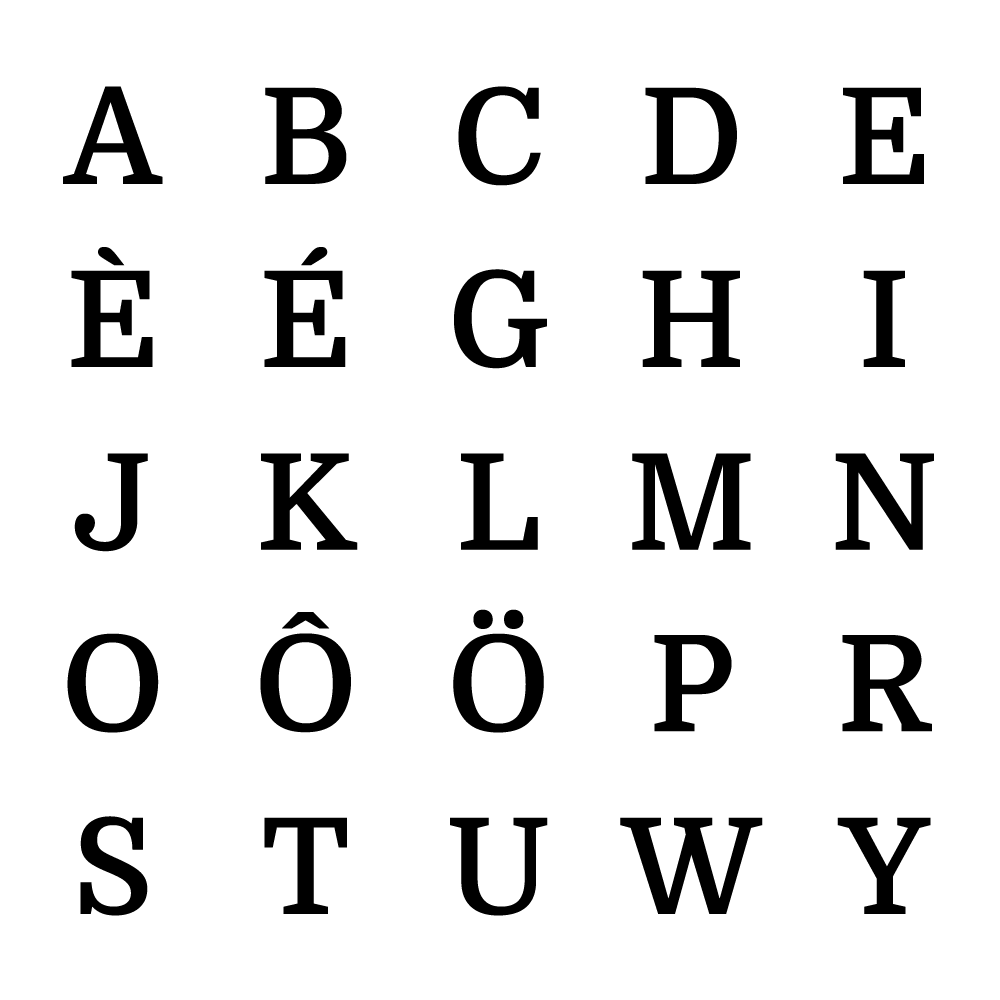
The modern Acehnese alphabet was established through the EBAYD spelling standard adopted at the 1980 seminar.

In the years following the granting of special autonomy to Aceh in 1959, efforts were made to reintroduce Acehnese into the school curriculum. This led to increased production of Acehnese textbooks and course materials. In response, Acehnese educators from universities in Banda Aceh sought to standardise the language's spelling system. These efforts culminated in the 1966 Seminar Bahasa Aceh (lit. 'The Acehnese Language Seminar'). A standard was determined through Jauhari Ishak's Tatabahasa Aceh (lit. 'Acehnese Grammar') in 1968.

In 1980, Ibrahim Hasan convened another seminar, Seminar Pembinaan dan Pengembangan Bahasa Aceh (lit. 'Acehnese Language Development and Fostering Seminar'). Held at Syiah Kuala University in Banda Aceh on 25–26 August 1980, it was attended by 73 linguists and educators. The seminar had three objectives:

1. To formulate a definitive standard for the Acehnese language in both its spoken and written forms.
2. To implement the teaching of the Acehnese language in schools, and to develop Acehnese further through education and mass media.
3. To standardise and codify Acehnese terminology as a means of contributing to the development of the national language.

The seminar established EBAYD as the agreed spelling standard, which remains in use to this day. The spelling system is based on Snouck's orthography, with several adjustments reflecting Indonesian spelling reforms, specifically the Enhanced Spelling System reform in 1972.

==== Translation of the Quran (1992) ====
In 1992, Ibrahim Husein, director of the Centre for Islamic Cultural Research and Studies (P3KI), convened another seminar. The seminar aimed to publish a translation of the Quran in the form of an Acehnese poem by Mahjiddin Jusuf. The spelling used in the translation is known as the 1992 P3KI Spelling.

The P3KI spelling simplifies the Acehnese diacritics agreed upon in the 1980 seminar because the technology available at the time made it difficult to use diacritic marks. Its proponents suggested that diacritics should be reserved for academic writings and teaching. Another change concerns the spelling of the Arabic sound /ʃ/, which is consistently spelt as ⟨ch⟩. A superscript comma is used to indicate vowel nasality, though the comma is omitted when a consonant precedes the vowel.

== Sample text ==
Original text
De Atjèhers, 1892

Tʰalam alòjkōm
hé teungkoe bandoem
Lōn moebri tʰaleuëm
ngòn teungkoe doemna
Lōn moebri ranoeb,
hana boengkōïh
Gampōng lōn djeuءōh
keunòë lōn teuka

EBAYD

Salam alaikôm
hé teungku bandum
Lôn mubri saleuem
ngön teungku dumna
Lôn mubri ranub,
hana bungkôh
Gampông lôn jeuôh
keunoe lôn teuka

Husaini

Salam alaikôm
hé teungku bandum
Lôn mubri saleuëm
ngon teungku dumna
Lôn mubri ranub,
hana bungkôh
Gampông lôn djeuôh
keunoë lôn teuka

Jawoe

سلام عليکم
هي تڠکو بندوم
لن مبري سلام
ڠن تڠکو دومنا
لن مبري رانوب،
هنا بوڠکوس
ݢمفوڠ لن جئوه
کني لن تکا

IPA

/sa.lam a.la.i.kom
he t̠ɯŋ.ku ban.dum/
/lon mu.bri sa.lɯə̯m
ŋʌn t̠ɯŋ.ku dum.na/
/lon mu.bri ɾa.nub,
ha.na buŋ.koh/
/gam.poŋ lon ɟɯ.ʔoh
kɯ.nɔə̯ lon t̠ɯ.ka/

English translation

Peace be upon you
To all of you, O brothers
I give my greetings
With you all
I give you a betel
Without the wrap
To my faraway hometown
I've now returned

=== Spelling comparison ===
The following table compares words across earlier Acehnese spelling systems, both in the Latin and Jawoe script.

| Word | IPA | Poeĕ Gata Basa Atjeh? Cantenius (1888) | Woordenboek der Atjehsche taal Van Langen (1889) | | De Atjèhers Snouck (1892) | Batjoet Sapeuë M. Djam & N. Tjoet (1911) | Lhèe Saboh Nang De Vries & Aboebakar (1932) | Seumangat Atjeh Arif (1945) | Tatabahasa Aceh Ishak (1974) | Husaini (1976) | EBAYD (1980) | P3KI (1992) |
| Word | IPA | Poeĕ Gata Basa Atjeh? Cantenius (1888) | Jawoe | Latin | De Atjèhers Snouck (1892) | Batjoet Sapeuë M. Djam & N. Tjoet (1911) | Lhèe Saboh Nang De Vries & Aboebakar (1932) | Seumangat Atjeh Arif (1945) | Tatabahasa Aceh Ishak (1974) | Husaini (1976) | EBAYD (1980) | P3KI (1992) |
|---|---|---|---|---|---|---|---|---|---|---|---|---|
| many | [lə] | lĕ | لا | lé | lë | le, lĕ | le | le | le | le | le | le |
| like such | [mɯ.ˈnan] | mĕnan | منن | mĕnan | meunan | meunan | meunan | meunan | meunan | meunan | meunan | meunan |
| don't | [bɛʔ] | bèk | بى | béء, béḳ | bèء | bèء | bè’ | bek | bèk | bèk | bèk | bek |
| death | [ma.ˈt̠e] | maté | ماتى | maté | maté | maté | maté | mate | maté | maté | maté | mate |
| good | [ɡɛt̠̚], [ɡʌt̠̚] | gèdj, gèd | ݢج | gĕdj | gèt | gèt | gèt | get | gèt | gèt | gèt, göt | get |
| and, with | [ŋʌn] | ngo̊n | ڠن | ngon | ngòn | ngon | ngon | ngon | ngon | ngon | ngön | ngon |
| stranger | [ɡɔp̚] | go̊b | ݢوب | gob | gòb | gob | gob | gob | gob | gob | gob, gop | gob |
| I, me | [lon] | loen | لن | loen | lōn | lōn | lōn | lon, lôn | lôn | lôn | lôn | lon |
| sea | [la.ˈʔot̠̚] | lao̊t, laut | لاوة | laoet | laءōt | laءōt | la’ōt | laot | laôt | laôt | laôt | laot |
| a little | [ba.ˈcut̠̚] | batjoet | باچوة | batjoet | batjoet | batjoet | batjoet | batjoet | bacut | batjut | bacut | bacut |
| hand | [ɟa.ˈɾoə̯] | djaroï | جاروى | djaroi | djaròë | djaroë | djaroë | djaroë | jaroe | djaroë | jaroe | jaroe |
| what | [puə̯], [pɯə̯] | poeĕ | ڤوي | poeĕ | peuë | peuë | peue | peue | peue | peuë | peue | peue |
| love | [s̻̪a.ˈjaŋ] | sajang | سايڠ | sajang | tʰajang | sajang | sajang | sajang | sayang | sajang | sayang | sayang |
| that, which | [ɲaŋ] | njang | ڽڠ | njang | njang | njang | njang | njang | nyang | njang | nyang | nyang |
| end, last | [a.ˈxe], [a.ˈkʰe] | achir | اخير | achir | achir | aché | | ache | akhé | akhé | akhé | akhe |
| sibling | [ʃɛə̯.da.ˈɾa] [cɛə̯.da.ˈɾa] | sjeedara | شودرا | sjèaudara | tʰèëdara | sèëdara | sèedara | sjeedara | | sjèëdara | cèedara | chedara |

== See also ==
- Indonesian orthography
- Acehnese language
- Acehnese phonology

== Bibliography ==
- Durie, Mark (1984). A grammar of Acehnese (PhD thesis). Australian National University. doi:10.25911/5d6fa25bcc31c. hdl:1885/138059.
- Durie, Mark (1985). A grammar of Acehnese: on the basis of a dialect of North Aceh. Verhandelingen van het Koninklijk Instituut voor Taal-, Land- en Volkenkunde 112. Dordrecht: Foris Publications. ISBN 90-6765-074-9.
- Daud, Bukhari (1997a). Writing and reciting Acehnese: perspectives on language and literature in Aceh (PhD thesis). The University of Melbourne. hdl:11343/37197.
- Daud, Bukhari; Durie, Mark (1999). Kamus basa Acèh/Kamus bahasa Aceh/Acehnese-Indonesian-English thesaurus. Pacific Linguistics Series C, Volume 151. Canberra: Pacific Linguistics. doi:10.15144/PL-C151. hdl:1885/146590. ISBN 0-85883-506-1.
- Wildan (2010). Kaidah Bahasa Aceh [The Principles of the Acehnese Language] (PDF) (in Indonesian) (1st ed.). Banda Aceh: Geuci. ISBN 978-979-96655-3-9.
- Sulaiman, Budiman (1977). Bahasa Aceh [The Acehnese Language] (PDF) (in Indonesian). Vol. 1. Banda Aceh.
- Cowan, H. K. J. (1981). "An Outline of Achehnese Phonology and Morphology". Bulletin of the School of Oriental and African Studies. 44 (3): 522–549.
- Zulfadli (2014). A Sociolinguistic Investigation of Acehnese with a Focus on West Acehnese: A Stigmatised Dialect (Bachelor of Education thesis). University of Adelaide.
