= The Third Choice =

Book by Mark Durie

- Book cover
- Author: Mark Durie
- Language: English
- Subject: Islamic Studies
- Publisher: Deror Books
- Publication date: February 1, 2010
- Media type: Hardcover, Paperback, E-Book
- Pages: 288
- ISBN: 978-0-9807223-0-7
- OCLC: 695930410
- LC Class: BP170 .D87 2010

The Third Choice: Islam, Dhimmitude and Freedom is a book written by Mark Durie, with a foreword by Bat Ye'or. It deals with the status of non-Muslim populations (the dhimmis) after the conquest of their lands by Muslims. The Third Choice was short-listed for the 2010 Australian Christian Book of the Year.

== Background ==
Durie claims "One of the most profound and least-understood manifestations of rejection in human history is the Islamic institution of the dhimma, the theologically-driven political, social, and legal system, imposed by Islamic law upon non-Muslims as an alternative to Islam (i.e. conversion) or the sword (i.e. death or captivity). The dhimma is the ‘third choice’ offered to non-Muslims under jihad conditions, and those who have accepted it are known as dhimmis. Their condition, dhimmitude, forms the subject of this book, which describes the challenge posed by Islam's treatment of non-Muslims, exposes the spiritual roots of this challenge, and offers a solution..."

== Commentary and criticism ==
According to the book review by Mervyn Bendle from James Cook University, Durie contends that instead of a "hardening of resolve", Western attitudes in the aftermath of the 9/11 attacks consisted of "widespread capitulation to Muslim demands" to the detriment of public policy, human rights, and free speech. Among other things, Durie cites various statements praising Islam by politicians such as Barack Obama, Nicolas Sarkozy and Mary Robinson; statements by Western politicians in support of Sharia law; and other statements of "humility" by Christian leaders as evidence of dhimmitude.

Adam A.J. DeVille from the University of St. Francis describes the book as a mix of scholarly and high journalism work. According to DeVille, the book does not provide enough evidence to substantiate the claims it makes, and this may be because Mark Durie is not an academic. He finds Durie "writes more cogently and dispassionately than" Bat Ye’or.

Mark Silinsky described the book in Middle East Quarterly as "a reasoned, comprehensive, and well-written book that is particularly apt for readers lacking an extensive background in Islam", and describes the book as "a good first choice for those concerned about dhimmitude today".

== See also ==
- Jizya
- Millet (Ottoman Empire)
