= Husaini Spelling System =

The Husaini Spelling System (Acehnese: Idjaan Husaini), also known as GAM Spelling System (Acehnese: Idjaan GAM), is a spelling standard for Acehnese. This spelling standard is developed by Husaini Muhammad Hasan, the former Minister of Education and Information of Aceh Sumatra.

== History ==
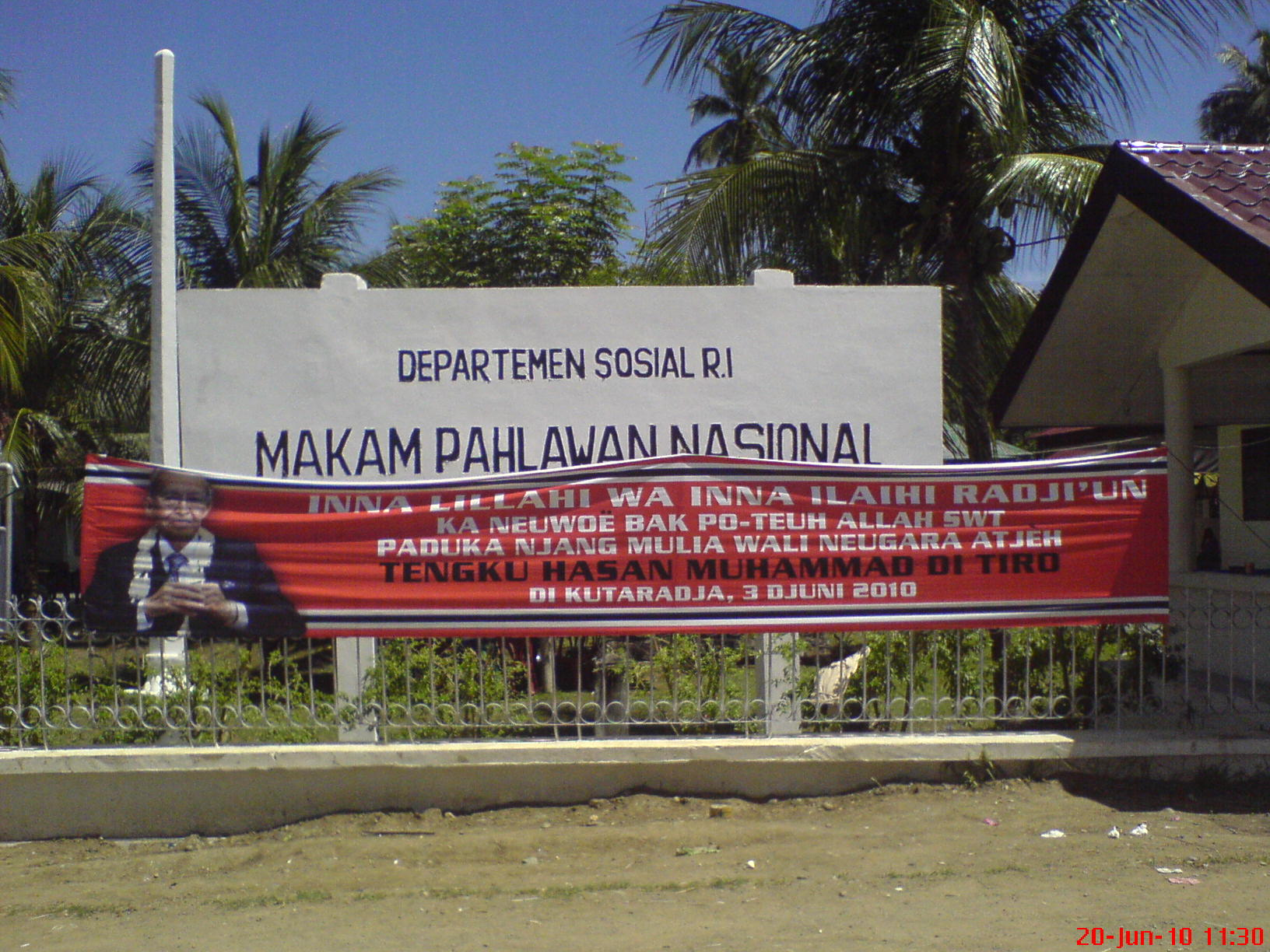
A banner announcing the death of Hasan di Tiro in Acehnese, written in the Husaini spelling system.

The Husaini spelling system developed during the early years of the Free Aceh Movement (GAM), where he further refined the system in his exile in Sweden. Hasan based the system on the spelling used by Hasan di Tiro.

Hasan later added that modern spelling systems, which were largely based on the reforms of 1972, is unsuitable for languages in Indonesia, as Indonesia was under the influence of the Netherlands, whereas the orthography chosen by the reform was inspired by the Malaysian orthography, which was heavily influenced by the English orthography. Citing his fear of Javanese colonialism, Hasan based his spelling on the system used pre-reform, the Soewandi spelling system.

Due to its ties to GAM and prevalent usage by GAM members and sympathisers, the Husaini spelling system is often referred simply as the GAM spelling system.

== Alphabet ==
The Husaini spelling system uses 22 basic Latin letters and four additional letters with diacritics:

Majuscule forms (uppercase)
A	B	D	E (Note: In diphthongs ending with /ə/, the letter ⟨ë⟩ is only used instead of ⟨e⟩.)	É	È	F	G	H	I	J	K	L	M	N	O	Ô	P	Q	R	S	T	U	W	Z
Minuscule forms (lowercase)
a	b	d	e	é	è	f	g	h	i	j	k	l	m	n	o	ô	p	q	r	s	t	u	w	z
IPA
a	b	d	ə	e	ɛ	f	ɡ	h	i	j	k, ʔ	l	m	n	ɔ	o	p	k	r	s	t̠	u	w	z

Alongside the letters above, the Husaini spelling system also has seven digraphs: eu /ɯ/, ng /ŋ/, nj /ɲ/, dj /ɟ/, tj /c/, sj /ʃ/ and kh /x/. Aspirated and murmured consonants are indicated with the glyph ⟨h⟩ placed after the consonant. The spelling system additionally marks vowel nasalisation with an apostrophe ⟨’⟩.

== See also ==
- Acehnese orthography

== Bibliography ==
Hasan, Husaini Muhammad (1980). Basa Atjeh Lam Tulehsan (Lam Huruh laten idjaan Husaini). Stockholm: Gunung Halimon.
