= Mark Durie =

Australian linguistics and theology scholar (born 1958)

- Born: 1958 (age 67–68); Papua, Australia
- Education: Australian National University (PhD); Melbourne School of Theology (ThD)
- Occupations: Priest; linguist; theologian
- Website: markdurie.com

Mark Durie (born 1958) is an Australian Anglican priest and a scholar in linguistics and theology. He is the founding director of the Institute for Spiritual Awareness, a Fellow at the Middle East Forum, and a senior research fellow of the Arthur Jeffery Centre for the Study of Islam at the Melbourne School of Theology.

== Career ==
Durie was born in Papua to missionary parents, and grew up in Canberra.

Durie was awarded a Ph.D. by the Australian National University in 1984. Subsequently, he held visiting appointments at the University of Leiden, Massachusetts Institute of Technology, the University of California, Los Angeles, Stanford University and the University of California, Santa Cruz. From 1987 to 1997 he held positions of postdoctoral fellow, lecturer, senior lecturer, reader and associate professor at the University of Melbourne. He was elected to the Australian Academy of the Humanities in 1992. Ordained an Anglican deacon and priest in 1999, he has served on the staff of St Mark's Camberwell, St Hilary's Kew, St Mary's Caulfield, St Clement's Elsternwick and St Catharine's South Caulfield. He holds a BTh (Hons), and DipTh from the Australian College of Theology and in 2016 completed a Th.D. with the Australian College of Theology and Melbourne School of Theology.

Durie has published articles and books on the Acehnese language of Aceh, Indonesia, linguistics, the genesis of the Quran and interfaith relations. His 1985 book A grammar of Acehnese: on the basis of a dialect of North Aceh has been described as "an urgently needed modern description of a very important language", and Durie has himself later been described as "the most accomplished specialist on Acehnese writing in English". He was the editor of the book The comparative method: regularity and irregularity in language change along with Malcolm Ross in 1996.

Durie has also been described as "an accomplished scholar of issues involving Christianity and Islam". He devoted himself to study Islam following the September 11 attacks in 2001, after he had previously been familiar with Islam in Aceh. His 2010 book The Third Choice: Islam, Dhimmitude and Freedom has a foreword by Bat Ye'or, and Durie has been described as a proponent of Ye'or's counter-jihadist worldview. Ye'or had earlier written a positive review of Durie's book Revelation? Do we Worship the same God? in National Review in 2006. Durie's 2013 book Liberty to the Captives: Freedom from Islam and Dhimmitude through the Cross has been said to provide "tools for Christians (particularly those living under the dominance of Islam) to adopt a biblical understanding of the cross in order to set them free from the influence of Islam", while his 2018 book The Qur'an and its Biblical Reflexes: Investigations into the Genesis of a Religion has been described as "a highly original work and a substantial contribution to the field of Qurʾānic Studies".

Durie has been noted for his writings on the linguistics relations between the Quran and the Bible, seeing the Quran as "biblical borrowing".

Durie spoke at a World Congress of Families conference in 2014, saying that the breakdown of the traditional family was "causing an epidemic of social problems". He has also provided commentary on Sky News Australia about the Anglican Church, as well as about the Quran and Hamas.

== Works ==
=== Books ===
- A grammar of Acehnese: on the basis of a dialect of North Aceh. Verhandelingen van het Koninklijk Instituut voor Taal-, Land- en Volkenkunde, Foris Publications. 1984. ISBN 978-9067650748.
- Catalogue of Acehnese Manuscripts in the Library of Leiden University and Other Collections Outside Aceh. Leiden University Library. 1994. ISBN 978-9074204057.
- Kamus bahasa Aceh. Vol. 151. Pacific Linguistics, Research School of Pacific and Asian Studies, Australian National University. 1999. ISBN 978-0858835061.
- Revelation? Do we Worship the same God?. CityHarvest International. 2006. ISBN 978-0977560264.
- The Third Choice: Islam, Dhimmitude and Freedom. Deror. 2010. ISBN 978-0980722307.
- Liberty to the Captives: Freedom from Islam and Dhimmitude through the Cross. Deror. 2013. ISBN 978-0987469106.
- Which God?: Jesus, Holy Spirit, God in Christianity and Islam. Deror. 2014. ISBN 978-0987469144.
- The Qur'an and its Biblical Reflexes: Investigations into the Genesis of a Religion. Lexington. 2018. ISBN 978-1498569453.
- Double-Minded: How Sex is Dividing the Australian Church. Deror. 2023. ISBN 978-1923067004.

=== Select publications ===
- Durie, Mark (1985). "Control and decontrol in acehnese". Australian Journal of Linguistics. 5 (1): 43–53. doi:10.1080/07268608508599335.
- Durie, Mark (1986). "The grammaticization of number as a verbal category". Annual Meeting of the Berkeley Linguistics Society. 12: 355–368. doi:10.3765/bls.v12i0.1876.
- Durie, Mark (1987). "Grammatical Relations in Acehnese" (PDF). Studies in Language. 11 (2): 365–399. doi:10.1075/sl.11.2.05dur.
- Durie, Mark (January 1988). "Preferred argument structure in an active language: Arguments against the category 'intransitive subject'". Lingua. 74 (1): 1–25. doi:10.1016/0024-3841(88)90046-0.
- Durie, Mark (March 1988). "The So-Called Passive of Acehnese". Language. 64 (1). Linguistic Society of America: 104–113. doi:10.2307/414788. JSTOR 414788.
- Durie, Mark (1988). Proto-Chamic and Acehnese mid vowels: towards Proto-Aceh-Chamic (PDF) (Report). University of Melbourne. Archived from the original on 24 December 2010.
- Durie, Mark (1988). "Verb Serialization and "Verbal-Prepositions" in Oceanic Languages" (PDF). Oceanic Linguistics. 27 (1/2) (Summer – Winter, 1988 ed.). University of Hawai'i Press: 1–23. doi:10.2307/3623147. JSTOR 623147.
- Durie, Mark (1994). "A case study of pragmatic linking". Text-Interdisciplinary Journal for the Study of Discourse. 14 (4): 495–530. doi:10.1515/text.1.1994.14.4.495.
- Durie, Mark (1997). "Grammatical structures in verb serialization". Complex Predicates: 289–354.
- Durie, Mark (2003). "New light on information pressure". Preferred Argument Structure. Studies in Discourse and Grammar. 14: 159–196. doi:10.1075/sidag.14.09dur. ISBN 978-90-272-2624-2.
- Durie, Mark (2022). "Semantic decomposition of four Quranic words". Russian Journal of Linguistics. 26 (4): 937–969. doi:10.22363/2687-0088-30779.
