= Voiceless dental and alveolar plosives =

Consonantal sounds

Voiceless alveolar plosive

t
- IPA number: 103

Audio sample
- source · help

Encoding
- Entity (decimal): &#116;
- Unicode (hex): U+0074
- X-SAMPA: t
- Braille: ⠞ (braille pattern dots-2345)
Image

Voiceless dental plosive

t̪
- IPA number: 103 408

Audio sample
- source · help

Encoding
- Entity (decimal): &#116;&#810;
- Unicode (hex): U+0074 U+032A
- X-SAMPA: t_d
- Braille: ⠞ (braille pattern dots-2345) ⠠ (braille pattern dots-6) ⠹ (braille pattern dots-1456)
Image

Voiceless postalveolar plosive

t̠

Audio sample
- source · help

Voiceless alveolar and dental plosives (or stops) are a type of consonantal sound used in almost all spoken languages. The alveolar is familiar to English-speakers as the ⟨t⟩ sound in stick.

The symbol in the International Phonetic Alphabet that represents voiceless dental, alveolar, and postalveolar plosives is ⟨t⟩. The voiceless dental plosive can be distinguished with the underbridge diacritic ⟨t̪⟩, and the postalveolar with a retraction line, ⟨t̠⟩. The extIPA also has a double underline diacritic which can be used to explicitly specify an alveolar pronunciation, ⟨t͇⟩.

The [t] sound is a very common sound cross-linguistically. Most languages have at least a plain [t], and some distinguish more than one variety. Some languages without a [t] are colloquial Samoan (which also lacks an [n]), Abau, and Nǁng of South Africa.

There are only a few languages which distinguish dental and alveolar stops (or often more precisely laminal and apical alveolar stops), including Kota, Toda, Venda and many Australian Aboriginal languages; certain varieties of Hiberno-English also distinguish them (with dental [t̪] being the local realization of the Standard English phoneme /θ/ spelled ⟨th⟩).

== Features ==
Sagittal sections of voiceless dental and alveolar plosives

Features of a voiceless alveolar stop:

- Its manner of articulation is occlusive, which means it is produced by obstructing airflow in the vocal tract. Since the consonant is also oral, with no nasal outlet, it is a plosive.
- There are three specific variants of [t]:
  - Dental, which means it is articulated with either the tip or the blade of the tongue at the upper teeth, termed respectively apical and laminal.
  - Denti-alveolar, which means it is articulated with the blade of the tongue at the alveolar ridge, and the tip of the tongue behind upper teeth.
  - Alveolar, which means it is articulated with either the tip or the blade of the tongue at the alveolar ridge, termed respectively apical and laminal.
- Its phonation is voiceless, which means it is produced without vibrations of the vocal cords. In some languages the vocal cords are actively separated, so it is always voiceless; in others the cords are lax, so that it may take on the voicing of adjacent sounds.
- It is an oral consonant, which means that air is not allowed to escape through the nose.
- It is a median consonant, which means it is produced by directing the airstream down the midline of the tongue, rather than to the sides.
- Its airstream mechanism is pulmonic, which means it is articulated by pushing air only with the intercostal muscles and abdominal muscles, as in most speech sounds.

== Occurrence ==
=== Dental or denti-alveolar ===
Unless otherwise specified, the examples in this table are laminal denti-alveolar.

Language		Word	IPA	Meaning	Notes
Aleut		tiistax̂	[t̪iːstaχ]	'dough'	
Armenian	Eastern	տուն	[t̪un]	'house'	
Assyrian Neo-Aramaic		ܬܠܬ̱ܐ/ţla	[t̪lɑ]	'three'	
Bashkir		дүрт/dürt	[dʏrt̪]	'four'	
Belarusian		стагоддзе	[s̪t̪äˈɣod̪d̪͡z̪ʲe]	'century'	See Belarusian phonology
Basque		toki	[t̪oki]	'place'	See Basque phonology
Bengali		তুমি	[t̪umi]	'you'	contrasts with aspirated form. See Bengali phonology
Catalan		terra	[ˈt̪ɛrə]	'land'	See Catalan phonology
Chuvash		ут	[ut]	'horse'	
Dinka		mɛth	[mɛ̀t̪]	'child'	contrasts with alveolar /t/.
Dutch	Belgian	taal	[t̪aːl̪]	'language'	
English	Dublin	thin	[t̪ʰɪn]	'thin'	May be pronounced instead as [t͡θ]. See Th-stopping.
English	Indian	thin	[t̪ʰɪn]	'thin'	Corresponds to [θ]. See Th-stopping.
English	Southern Irish	thin	[t̪ʰɪn]	'thin'	Corresponds to [θ]. See Th-stopping.
English	Ulster	train	[t̪ɹeːn]	'train'	Allophone of /t/ before /r/, in free variation with an alveolar stop.
Finnish		tutti	[ˈt̪ut̪ːi]	'pacifier'	See Finnish phonology
French		tordu	[t̪ɔʁd̪y]	'crooked'	See French phonology
Hakka		他/ta3	[t̪ʰa˧]	'he/she'	contrasts with an unaspirated form.
Hindustani	Hindi	तीन/tīn	[t̪iːn]	'three'	Contrasts with aspirated form (⟨थ⟩ in Hindi, ⟨تھ⟩ in Urdu). See Hindustani phonology
Hindustani	Urdu	تین/tīn	[t̪iːn]	'three'	Contrasts with aspirated form (⟨थ⟩ in Hindi, ⟨تھ⟩ in Urdu). See Hindustani phonology
Hmong	White Hmong	𖬆𖬰𖬧𖬵 / tub	[t̪u˦]	'son', 'boy' or 'male name'	
Indonesian		tabir	[t̪äbɪr]	'curtain'	most often transcribed in IPA with ⟨t⟩.
Italian		tale	[ˈt̪ale]	'such'	See Italian phonology
Japanese		特別/tokubetsu	[t̪o̞kɯ̟ᵝbe̞t͡sɨᵝ]	'special'	See Japanese phonology
Kashubian		ptôch	[ptɞx]	'bird'	
Kazakh		тұз	[t̪us̪]	'salt'	
Kyrgyz		туз	[t̪us̪]	'salt'	
Latvian		tabula	[ˈt̪äbulä]	'table'	See Latvian phonology
Malayalam		കാത്ത്	[kaːt̪ːɨ̆]	'waiting'	Contrasts /t̪ t ʈ d̪ ɖ/. See Malayalam phonology
Mapudungun		füṯa	[ˈfɘt̪ɜ]	'husband'	Interdental.
Marathi		तबला	[t̪əbˈlaː]	'tabla'	contrasts with aspirated form. See Marathi phonology
Minangkabau	Padang	tuo	[t̪u.o̞]	'old'	
Nepali		ताली	[t̪äli]	'clapping'	Contrasts with aspirated form. See Nepali phonology
Nunggubuyu		darag	[t̪aɾaɡ]	'whiskers'	
Odia		ତାରା/tara	[t̪ärä]	'star'	contrasts with aspirated form.
Pazeh		[mut̪apɛt̪aˈpɛh]		'keep clapping'	Dental.
Polish		tom	[t̪ɔm]	'volume'	See Polish phonology
Portuguese	Many dialects	montanha	[mõˈt̪ɐɲɐ]	'mountain'	Likely to have allophones among native speakers, as it may affricate to [tʃ], [tɕ] and/or [ts] in certain environments. See Portuguese phonology
Punjabi		ਤੇਲ/تیل	[t̪eːl]	'oil'	
Russian		то	[t̪o̞]	'that'	See Russian phonology
Scottish Gaelic		taigh	[t̪ʰɤj]	'house'	Apical dental. Contrasts between aspirated and unaspirated forms.
Serbo-Croatian		туга/tuga	[t̪ǔːgä]	'sorrow'	See Serbo-Croatian phonology
Sinhala		අත	[at̪ə]	'hand'	
Slovene		tip	[ˈt̪îːp]	'type'	See Slovene phonology
Slovak		toto	[ˈt̪ot̪o]	'this'	See Slovak phonology
Somali		matag	[mat̪ag]	'vomit'	Dentalization of alveolar plosive.
Spanish		tango	[ˈt̪ãŋɡo̞]	'tango'	See Spanish phonology
Swedish		tåg	[ˈt̪ʰoːɡ]	'train'	See Swedish phonology
Tamil		தாய்	[t̪apːu]	'mother (of self)'	See Tamil phonology
Telugu		తప్పు	[t̪apːu]	'wrong'	Contrasts between aspirated and unaspirated forms.
Turkish		at	[ät̪]	'horse'	See Turkish phonology
Ukrainian		брат	[brɑt̪]	'brother'	See Ukrainian phonology
Uzbek			–		Slightly aspirated before vowels.
Vietnamese		tuần	[t̪wən˨˩]	'week'	contrasts with aspirated form. See Vietnamese phonology
Zapotec	Tilquiapan	tant	[t̪ant̪]	'so much'	

=== Alveolar ===
Language		Word	IPA	Meaning	Notes
Abkhaz		иҭабуп	[itʰabwpʼ]	'thank you'	See Abkhaz phonology
Adyghe		тфы	[tfə]	'five'	
Afrikaans		tafel		'pot'	
Arabic	Egyptian	توكة/tōka	[ˈtoːkæ]	'barrette'	See Egyptian Arabic phonology
Assyrian		ܒܝܬܐ/bèta	[beːta]	'house'	Most speakers. In the Tyari, Barwari and Southern dialects θ is used.
Bengali		গাধাটি	[gɐd̪ʱɐti]	'the donkey'	True alveolar in some eastern dialects. But all Bengali speakers allophone of /t/ after and before denti-alveolar and postalveolar /t̪, t̪ʰ, d̪, d̪ʱ, tʃ, tʃʰ, dʒ, dʒʱ, ʃ/. See Bengali phonology
Breton		ti	[ti]	'house'	
Cantonese		跌/dit	[tiːt̚˧]	'fall' (v.)	See Cantonese Phonology
Cantonese		鐵/鉄/tit	[tʰiːt̚˧]	'iron'	See Cantonese Phonology
Chechen		тарсал/tarsal	[tɑːrsəl]	'squirrel'	
Czech		toto	[ˈtoto]	'this'	See Czech phonology
Danish	Standard	dåse	[ˈtɔ̽ːsə]	'can' (n.)	Usually transcribed in IPA with ⟨d̥⟩ or ⟨d⟩. Contrasts with the affricate [t͡s] or aspirated stop [tʰ] (depending on the dialect), which are usually transcribed in IPA with ⟨tˢ⟩ or ⟨t⟩. See Danish phonology
Dutch		taal	[taːɫ]	'language'	See Dutch phonology
English	Most speakers	tick	[tʰɪk]	'tick'	See English phonology
English	New York	tick	[tʰɪk]	'tick'	Varies between apical and laminal, with the latter being predominant.
Hebrew		תמונה	[tmuˈna]	'image'	see Modern Hebrew phonology
Hungarian		tutaj	[ˈtutɒj]	'raft'	See Hungarian phonology
Indonesian	Most speakers	tabir	[täbɪr]	'curtain'	Commonly [t̪] by other speakers.
Kabardian		тхуы	[txʷə]	'five'	
Khmer		តែ/tê	[tae]	'tea'	See Khmer phonology
Korean		대숲/daesup	[tɛsup̚]	'bamboo forest'	See Korean phonology
Kurdish	Northern	tu	[tʰʊ]	'you'	See Kurdish phonology
Kurdish	Central	تەوێڵ	[tʰəweːɫ]	'forehead'	See Kurdish phonology
Kurdish	Southern	تێوڵ	[tʰeːwɨɫ]	'forehead'	See Kurdish phonology
Luxembourgish		dënn	[tən]	'thin'	Less often voiced [d]. It is usually transcribed /d/, and it contrasts with voiceless aspirated form, which is usually transcribed /t/. See Luxembourgish phonology
Malayalam		കാറ്റ്	[kaːtːɨ̆]	'wind'	Contrasts /t̪ t ʈ d̪ ɖ/. See Malayalam phonology
Maltese		tassew	[tasˈsew]	'true'	
Mandarin		地/dì	[ti˥˩]	'ground'	See Mandarin Phonology
Mandarin		梯/tī	[tʰi˥˥]	'ladder/stairs'	See Mandarin Phonology
Mapudungun		füta	[ˈfɘtɜ]	'elderly'	
Nunggubuyu		darawa	[taɾawa]	'greedy'	
Nuosu		ꄉ/da	[ta˧]	'place'	Contrasts aspirated and unaspirated forms
Portuguese	Some dialects	troço	[ˈtɾɔsu]	'thing' (pejorative)	Allophone before alveolar /ɾ/. In other dialects /ɾ/ takes a denti-alveolar allophone instead. See Portuguese phonology
Scots	Most dialects	tak	[täk]	'take'	Traditionally apical. Can be aspirated word-initially in more English-influenced varieties.
Tagalog		matamis	[mɐtɐˈmis]	'sweet'	See Tagalog phonology
Thai		ตา/ta	[taː˧]	'eye'	Contrasts with an aspirated form.
West Frisian		tosk	[ˈtosk]	'tooth'	See West Frisian phonology

=== Postalveolar ===
Language	Word	IPA	Meaning	Notes
Acehnese	teubèe	[t̠ɯ.ˈbɛə̯]	'sugarcane'	See Acehnese phonology
Bengali	ঠাণ্ডা	[t̠ʰanɖa]	'cold'	Apical postalveolar; contrasts aspirated forms. See Bengali phonology
Hindustani	टोपी/ ٹوپی	[t̠oːpiː]	'hat'	Apical postalveolar
Nepali	टोली	[t̠oli]	'team'	Apical postalveolar; contrasts unaspirated and aspirated forms. See Nepali phonology
Odia	ଟଗର / ṭagara	[t̠ɔgɔrɔ]	'crepe jasmine'	Apical postalveolar; contrasts unaspirated and aspirated forms.
Yele	dêê	[t̠əː]	'tongue'	Contrasts /t̪ t̪͡p t̪ʲ t̠ t̠͡p t̠ʲ/.

=== Variable ===
Language		Word	IPA	Meaning	Notes
Arabic	Modern Standard	تين/tīn	[tiːn]	'fig'	Laminal denti-alveolar or alveolar, depending on the speaker's native dialect. See Arabic phonology
English	Broad South African	talk	[toːk]	'talk'	Laminal denti-alveolar for some speakers, alveolar for other speakers.
English	Scottish	talk	[tʰɔk]	'talk'	Laminal denti-alveolar for some speakers, alveolar for other speakers.
English	Welsh	talk	[tʰɒːk]	'talk'	Laminal denti-alveolar for some speakers, alveolar for other speakers.
German	Standard	Tochter	[ˈtɔxtɐ]	'daughter'	Varies between laminal denti-alveolar, laminal alveolar and apical alveolar. See Standard German phonology
Greek		τρία tria	[ˈtɾiä]	'three'	Varies between dental, laminal denti-alveolar and alveolar, depending on the environment. See Modern Greek phonology
Malay		تڠکڤ/tangkap	[t̪äŋ.käp̚]	'catch'	More commonly dental. Often unreleased in syllable codas. See Malay phonology
Norwegian	Urban East	dans	[t̻ɑns]	'dance'	Varies between laminal denti-alveolar and laminal alveolar. It is usually transcribed /d/. It may be partially voiced [d̥], and it contrasts with voiceless aspirated form, which is usually transcribed /t/. See Norwegian phonology
Persian		توت	[t̪ʰuːt̪ʰ]	'berry'	Varies between laminal denti-alveolar and apical alveolar. See Persian phonology
Slovak		to	[t̻ɔ̝]	'that'	Varies between laminal denti-alveolar and laminal alveolar. See Slovak phonology
Toki Pona		toki	[ˈtoki]	'language'	Can be aspirated.

== See also ==
- Index of phonetics articles

== Notes ==
Place →	Labial					Coronal										Dorsal					Laryngeal			
Manner ↓	Bilabial		Labiodental		Linguolabial		Dental		Alveolar		Postalveolar		Retroflex		(Alveolo-)palatal		Velar		Uvular		Pharyngeal/epiglottal		Glottal	
Nasal	m̥	m	ɱ̊	ɱ		n̼	n̪̊	n̪	n̥	n	n̠̊	n̠	ɳ̊	ɳ	ɲ̊	ɲ	ŋ̊	ŋ	ɴ̥	ɴ				
Plosive	p	b	p̪	b̪	t̼	d̼	t̪	d̪	t	d			ʈ	ɖ	c	ɟ	k	ɡ	q	ɢ	ʡ		ʔ	
Sibilant affricate							t̪s̪	d̪z̪	ts	dz	t̠ʃ	d̠ʒ	tʂ	dʐ	tɕ	dʑ								
Non-sibilant affricate	pɸ	bβ	p̪f	b̪v			t̪θ	d̪ð	tɹ̝̊	dɹ̝	t̠ɹ̠̊˔	d̠ɹ̠˔			cç	ɟʝ	kx	ɡɣ	qχ	ɢʁ	ʡʜ	ʡʢ	ʔh	
Sibilant fricative							s̪	z̪	s	z	ʃ	ʒ	ʂ	ʐ	ɕ	ʑ								
Non-sibilant fricative	ɸ	β	f	v	θ̼	ð̼	θ	ð	θ̠	ð̠	ɹ̠̊˔	ɹ̠˔	ɻ̊˔	ɻ˔	ç	ʝ	x	ɣ	χ	ʁ	ħ	ʕ	h	ɦ
Approximant		β̞		ʋ				ð̞		ɹ		ɹ̠		ɻ		j		ɰ						˷
Tap/flap		ⱱ̟		ⱱ					ɾ̥	ɾ			ɽ̊	ɽ						ɢ̆		ʡ̆		
Trill	ʙ̥	ʙ							r̥	r		r̠	ɽ̊r̥	ɽr					ʀ̥	ʀ	ʜ	ʢ		
Lateral affricate									tɬ	dɮ			tꞎ	d𝼅	c𝼆	ɟʎ̝	k𝼄	ɡʟ̝						
Lateral fricative							ɬ̪		ɬ	ɮ			ꞎ	𝼅	𝼆	ʎ̝	𝼄	ʟ̝						
Lateral approximant								l̪	l̥	l		l̠	ɭ̊	ɭ	ʎ̥	ʎ	ʟ̥	ʟ		ʟ̠				
Lateral tap/flap									ɺ̥	ɺ			𝼈̊	𝼈		ʎ̆		ʟ̆						

		BL	LD	D	A	PA	RF	P	V	U
Implosive	Voiced	ɓ			ɗ		ᶑ	ʄ	ɠ	ʛ
Implosive	Voiceless	ɓ̥			ɗ̥		ᶑ̊	ʄ̊	ɠ̊	ʛ̥
Ejective	Stop	pʼ			tʼ		ʈʼ	cʼ	kʼ	qʼ
Ejective	Affricate		p̪fʼ	tθʼ	tsʼ	tʃʼ	tʂʼ	tɕʼ	kxʼ	qχʼ
Ejective	Fricative	ɸʼ	fʼ	θʼ	sʼ	ʃʼ	ʂʼ	ɕʼ	xʼ	χʼ
Ejective	Lateral affricate				tɬʼ			c𝼆ʼ	k𝼄ʼ	q𝼄ʼ
Ejective	Lateral fricative				ɬʼ					
Click (top: velar; bottom: uvular)	Tenuis	kʘ qʘ		kǀ qǀ	kǃ qǃ		k𝼊 q𝼊	kǂ qǂ		
Click (top: velar; bottom: uvular)	Voiced	ɡʘ ɢʘ		ɡǀ ɢǀ	ɡǃ ɢǃ		ɡ𝼊 ɢ𝼊	ɡǂ ɢǂ		
Click (top: velar; bottom: uvular)	Nasal	ŋʘ ɴʘ		ŋǀ ɴǀ	ŋǃ ɴǃ		ŋ𝼊 ɴ𝼊	ŋǂ ɴǂ	ʞ	
Click (top: velar; bottom: uvular)	Tenuis lateral				kǁ qǁ					
Click (top: velar; bottom: uvular)	Voiced lateral				ɡǁ ɢǁ					
Click (top: velar; bottom: uvular)	Nasal lateral				ŋǁ ɴǁ					
