= Acehnese language =

Austronesian language spoken in Indonesia

Acehnese
- Achinese
- Bahsa/Basa Acèh بهسا اچيه
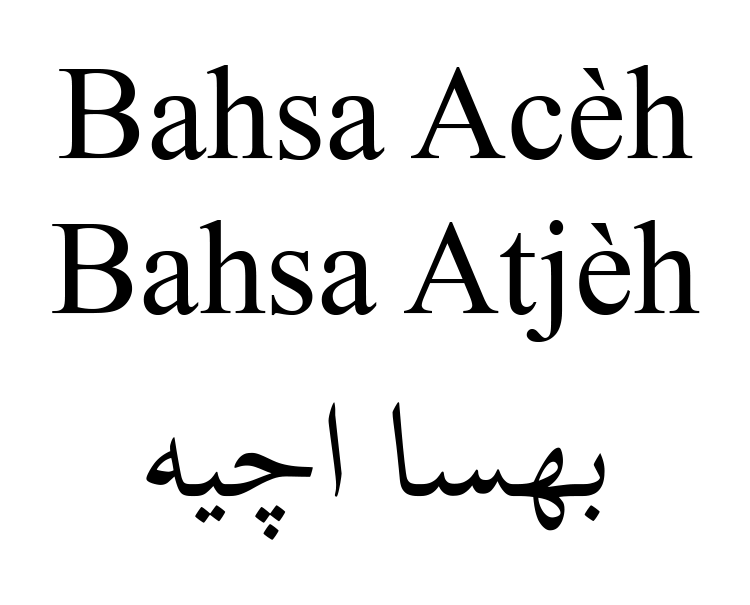
- Bahsa Acèh written in the Latin script (EBAYD spelling, Husaini spelling), and the Arabic script (Jawoe)
- Pronunciation: [bahsa at͡ʃɛh]
- Native to: Indonesia; Malaysia
- Region: Aceh, Sumatra; Kedah
- Ethnicity: 3.37 million Acehnese (2010 census)
- Native speakers: 2.8 million (2010 census)
- Language family: Austronesian: Malayo-Polynesian; Malayo-Sumbawan (?); Chamic; Acehnese
- Early forms: Proto-Austronesian: Proto-Malayo-Polynesian; Proto-Chamic; Old Acehnese
- Standard forms: Standard Acehnese (North Acehnese)
- Dialects: North Acehnese; Pidie; Great Aceh; Daya; West Acehnese
- Writing system: Latin script (Acehnese alphabet); Jawoe script

Official status
- Official language in: Indonesia: Aceh
- Regulated by: Badan Pengembangan dan Pembinaan Bahasa (in Indonesia)

Language codes
- ISO 639-2: ace
- ISO 639-3: ace
- Glottolog: achi1257
- Areas where Acehnese is a majority Areas where Acehnese is a significant minority

Speakers of Acehnese

Acehnese (/ˌɑːtʃəˈniːz/ AH-chə-NEEZ; EBAYD: Bahsa/Basa Acèh; Husaini: Bahsa/Basa Atjèh; Jawoe: بهسا اچيه, IPA: /ba(h)sa at͡ʃɛh/), also written as Achinese, is an Austronesian language belonging to the Chamic branch natively spoken by the Acehnese people in Aceh, Sumatra, Indonesia. This language is also spoken by Acehnese descendants in some parts of Malaysia like in Kedah. Acehnese is used as the co-official language in the province of Aceh, alongside Indonesian.

Being part of the Chamic languages group, Acehnese is the only Austronesian language of the Chamic branch spoken in Indonesia, its closest relatives are the other Chamic languages, which are principally spoken in Vietnam and Cambodia.

== Classification ==
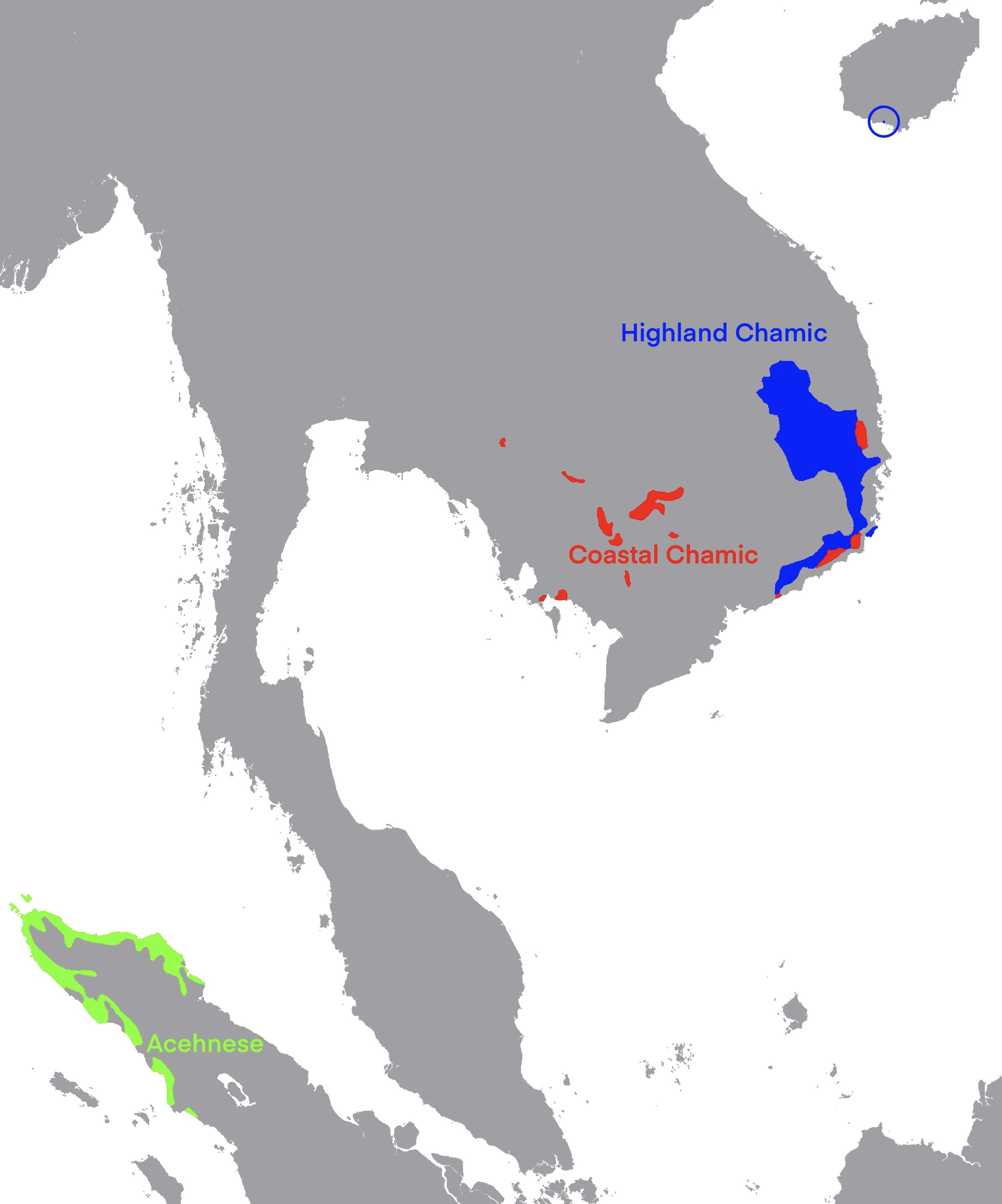
Acehnese (green) is an outlier of the Chamic branch.

Acehnese belongs to the Malayo-Polynesian branch of Austronesian. Acehnese's closest relatives are the other Chamic languages, which are principally spoken in Vietnam and Cambodia. The distant relative of the Chamic family is the Malayic language family, which includes languages also spoken in Sumatra such as Minangkabau as well as the national language, Indonesian.

Paul Sidwell notes that Acehnese likely has an Austroasiatic substratum.

Linguist Paul Sidwell wrote that "Sometime during this early phase of language shift, perhaps before the beginning of Common Era, the Chamic speakers who were to become the Acehnese left the mainland on a journey that would ultimately end in northern Sumatra." Basing on Graham Thurgood's thesis, Sidwell argues that Acehnese likely had been long separated from Chamic around the first to second century BCE.

== History ==
The first speakers of Cham, which would later become Acehnese, arrived in Sumatra from the Kingdom of Champa, where they would establish a trading outpost and refugee colony. Further Cham migrations would increase in the late 900s from the fall of Indrapura, as people fled to Angkor, Hainan, Malacca, and Aceh. A historical connection between Aceh and Champa still can be seen in modern times through the folk song Bungong Jeumpa (Champak flower), which is about a flower from the Kingdom of Jeumpa, which Cowan relates to Champa, with the folk song itself believed to have originated from an oral tradition tracing back to Champa.

Acehnese was historically isolated within the regions of Great Aceh and Daya in the northwestern most tip of modern day Aceh, before later spreading into the northern and western coastal regions during the expansion of the Aceh Sultanate under the rule of Ali Mughayat Syah in 1520 through 1524.

=== Etymology ===
The etymology for Aceh is unclear and the term didn't exist in historical records until the 1500s, the earliest usage of Aceh largely refers to the port city of Banda Aceh and generally to the region of Great Aceh as a whole, which can be seen in the expression "jak u Acèh (going to Aceh)" used by people outside of the region to mean "to go to Great Aceh".

The word Aceh was first used by Tomé Pires in 1520, which was spelt as Achei, several other variants can be found in European historical records from the 16th to the 18th centuries, such as Achem by the Portuguese, Achin by the English, and Atjeh by the Dutch. The name Achinese and Achehnese was used to refer to the language in English, the modern term Acehnese, which is the one used today, was first coined from a 1906 English translation of Snouck Hurgronje's Studiën over Atjèhsche Klank-en Schriftleer from 1892.

=== Literature ===
Literature written in Acehnese was limited, as most literature in Aceh was written in Malay, which was the lingua franca at the time, with the earliest written record of Acehnese is from a manuscript titled Hikayat Sama'un (The Story of Syama'un) from 1658 CE. Acehnese literature at the time were mostly in the form of poetry, either as hikayat or nazam, very few works were in prose, one of which was Kitab Bakeu Meunan, a translation of the book Qawaa'id al-Islaam.

During the early 1890s, several Dutch publications was made to document and study Acehnese language and literature practises, which mainly uses the Latin script to transcribe the language. In 1888, Hendrik August Nicolaas Catenius publishes a trilingual phrase book Poeĕ Gata Basa Atjeh? (Spreekt gij Atjehsch?), 'Do You Speak Acehnese?', containing phrases in Dutch, Malay, and Acehnese. In 1891, Snouck Hurgronje was sent to Aceh by the Dutch government, where he collected and study Acehnese and its literacy traditions for seven months. In 1892, he would publish Studiën over Atjèhsche Klank-en Schriftleer, 'The Study of Acehnese Language and Script', which he explains and presents his Latin orthography to write Acehnese.

Under the program of Ethical Policy, the colonial government of Dutch East Indies attempts to provide public education for the indigenous population, which initiated literacy programs in Acehnese using the Latin script, which later became widely used and adapted by publications regarding Acehnese literature for educational and teaching purposes with support from the Dutch government from the 1910s to the 1930s. Acehnese literature stalled after the Indonesian National Revolution due to the political instability at the time and the ongoing Darul Islam rebellion that was taking place in Aceh. Efforts to promote and standardise Acehnese began in the 1960s, with educational guide and materials being published to teach Acehnese in primary schools, which was taught as a required subject since 1968.

The first encyclopedia in Acehnese, the Acehnese Wikipedia, was launched on August 12, 2009. A prose translation of the Quran in Acehnese was published by the Ministry of Religious Affairs on December 13, 2018. As of now, there is no newspaper published in Acehnese. In 2020, the first Acehnese-language magazine, Majalah Neurôk, was launched, initiated by an Acehnese cultural figure, Ayah Panton. Google Translate added the Acehnese language translation feature on June 27, 2024.

== Geographic distribution and dialects ==
Acehnese is primarily spoken in the northern tip of Sumatra, largely concentrated within the northern and western coastal regions. Acehnese is spoken by around 2.8 million people (2010 census) within the province of Aceh, Indonesia. Acehnese is also spoken in neighbouring Malaysia, notably in Kampung Acheh, an ethnic enclave within the region of Yan District, Kedah, where in 2013, 64.4% of Acehnese descendants in the village speaks Acehnese with family.

Acehnese has a wide arrange of dialect variations, usually divided into four major grouping of dialects:

- North Acehnese, spoken in Bireuen, North Aceh, Lhokseumawe, East Aceh, and Langsa.
- Pidie, spoken in Pidie, Pidie Jaya, and pockets in Rusip Antara District of Central Aceh.
- Great Aceh, spoken in Sabang, Banda Aceh, and Aceh Besar.
- and West Acehnese, spoken in Aceh Jaya, West Aceh, and large portions of Nagan Raya, Southwest Aceh, and South Aceh.

An additional fifth dialect, Daya, also referred to as Lamnoe, spoken in Aceh Jaya, is also recognised as a major dialect, splitting from West Aceh.

The dialects of Acehnese, split into four major groupings. North Acehnese (Peusangan, Pasè, North Aceh, East Aceh) Pidie (Pidie and surrounding areas) Great Aceh (Aceh Besar, Banda Aceh, Sabang, Leupung) Daya (Aceh Jaya, Kuala Daya, Lam No, Lam Me) West Acehnese (Aceh Jaya, West Aceh, Tunong, Seunangan, Meulabôh)

Standard Acehnese, or North Acehnese, is the standard form of Acehnese taught in education, specifically, Standard Acehnese is based on the Peusangan dialect of North Aceh. The North Aceh dialect is a phonologically homogenous dialect, with little to no variation between speakers other than minor lexical differences.

Pidie is spoken between the dialects of Great Aceh and North Aceh, mainly in Pidie. Similar to North Aceh, Pidie is a homogenous dialect, but not as consistent as North Aceh. Pidie is characterised by the pronunciation of final /h/ with a palatal glide before it, such as pronouncing tikôh /t̠ikoh/ as tikôih [t̠ikoi̯h].

Great Aceh and Daya are spoken on the northwestern region of Aceh, they are notable for its stark dialect varieties between villages compared to the largely homogeneous dialects of North Aceh and Pidie. Due to the vast difference between variants, it is thought to be the original area where Acehnese is first spoken, though the dialects of Great Aceh and Daya are generally similar to each other. Great Aceh is characterised by its pronunciation of /s/ as [θ] and /r/ as a uvular or velar fricative [ɣ ~ ʁ], while Daya is additionally characterised by its vast range of variety, with asoe /asɔə̯/ (flesh) having over five possible variant pronunciations: [aθɔə̯], [aθɔ], [aθɔi̯], [aθai̯], and [aθɛ].

West Acehnese is spoken on the western coast of Aceh, below Great Aceh, Daya, and Pidie. West Aceh is characterised by its pronunciation of /r/, compared to the alveolar trill of North Aceh and Pidie, West Aceh pronounces /r/ as a uvular fricative [ʁ], similar to those of Great Aceh and Daya.

Aside from the five major grouping, Acehnese dialects can be further subdivided into ten groups: Pasè, Peusangan, and Matang from the North; Pidie; Bueng, Banda Aceh of Great Aceh; and Daya, Meulabôh, Seunagan, and Tunong of West Coast.

== Phonology ==
Acehnese's phonology inventory are as follows:

=== Vowels ===
Acehnese distinguishes between oral and nasal vowels, though not all phonemes have a nasal equivalent.

Acehnese vowels

Acehnese monophthongs
	Front		Central		Back	
	oral	nasal	oral	nasal	oral	nasal
Close	i	ĩ	ɯ	ɯ̃	u	ũ
Close-mid	e	ɛ̃	ə	ʌ̃	o	ɔ̃
Open-mid	ɛ	ɛ̃	ʌ	ʌ̃	ɔ	ɔ̃
Open			a	ã		

Acehnese diphthongs
	Front		Central			Back		
	oral	nasal	oral		nasal	oral		nasal
Close	iə̯	ĩə̯	ɯə̯		ɯ̃i̯	uə̯	ui̯	ũə̯
Close-mid			əi̯			oi̯		
Open-mid	ɛə̯	ɛ̃ə̯	ʌə̯	ʌi̯		ɔə̯	ɔi̯	
Open			ai̯		ãi̯			

=== Consonants ===
The table below shows the Acehnese consonants range of their realizations.

Acehnese consonants
		Labial	Alveolar	Palatal	Velar	Glottal
Nasal	plain	m	n	ɲ	ŋ	
Nasal	post-oralized	(mᵇ)	(nᵈ)	(ɲᶡ)	(ŋᶢ)	
Plosive	voiceless	p	t̠	c	k	ʔ
Plosive	voiced	b	d	ɟ	ɡ	
Fricative		(f)	s ([s̻̪~θ])	(ʃ)		h
Approximant			l	j	w	
Trill			r			

Notes:

- The /h/ clusters are heard as aspirated /pʰ, tʰ, cʰ, kʰ/ or murmured /bʱ, dʱ, ɟʱ, ɡʱ, lʱ, rʱ/.
- The alveolar fricative is realised as a voiceless denti-alveolar sibilant [s̻̪], similar to English's th as in "think", described by Durie as "a laminal alveo-dental fricative with a wide channel area". The fricative has also been described as a plain voiceless dental sibilant /θ/.
- The voiceless alveolar stop is realised as postalveolar [t̠].
- The phoneme /ʔ/ is represented by final orthographic ⟨k⟩, in medial and initial positions it's unmarked.
- Arabic phonemes such as /z/, /f/, and /q/ are often nativised to /d/, /pʰ/, and /k/ respectively. Arabic /ʃ/ and /x/ varies, /ʃ/ can be realised as /c/, /cʰ/, or /s/, and /x/ can be realised as /kʰ/, /k/, or /h/.
- The phoneme /pʰ/ is often articulated as the affricate /ɸ/, Acehnese speakers realise the phoneme /f/ as /ɸ/, both in Arabic and modern loans.
- In the Northern dialect, the nasals /m/, /n/, /ɲ/, /ŋ/ are realized as post-oralized nasals (also called "funny nasals") before oral vowels and consonants. They are distinct from the nasal–plosive sequences /mb/, /nd/, /ɲɟ/, /ŋɡ/, e.g. in [banᵈa] 'port' vs [mandum] 'all'. Outside of the Northern dialect, post-oralized nasals are treated as plain nasal–plosive sequences.

== Grammar ==
Acehnese features a split ergative system. Intransitives that align with the agent of a transitive verb (Sa) always show agreement by a proclitic (1). Meanwhile, intransitives that align with the patient of a transitive verb (Sp) may optionally show agreement by an enclitic (2). Volitionality is the determining factor for whether an intransitive verb is Sa or Sp.

Jih ka=ji=jak.
he INCHO=3=go
"He has gone."

Gopnyan ka=sakét=geuh.
he INCHO=sick=3
"He is sick."

=== Pronouns ===
All Acehnese pronouns and animate, more often than not human, a demonstative is used to refer to something inanimate. As with Malay, Acehnese only distinguishes between singular and plural, though they do have a system of respect or politeness.

The table below provides the most commonly used pronouns and their respect in the Acehnese language:

Person	Clusivity	Respect	Singular	Plural
1st person	exclusive	familiar	kèe	kamoe
1st person	exclusive	standard	lôn	kamoe
1st person	exclusive	polite	ulôn	kamoe
1st person	exclusive	most polite	(u)lôntuwan	kamoe
1st person	inclusive			(geu)tanyoe
2nd person		familiar	kah	awak kah
2nd person		standard	gata	awak gata
2nd person		polite	droeneuh	awak droeneuh
3rd person		familiar	jih	awak nyan
3rd person		standard	gopnyan	ureueng nyan
3rd person		polite	droeneuh nyan	

Acehnese has three tiers of respect: familiar or colloquial/informal, standard or neutral, and polite or formal.

==== First person ====
Acehnese has two forms of "I": kèe (familiar) and ulôn, 'slave' (polite), lôn is a shortened variant of ulôn, though they're considered the same pronoun, the form lôn is seen more informal. ulôn and lôn may also be written as ulông and lông, though it's seen as non-standard. The word tuwan, 'lord' may be added at the end of ulôn or lôn to be more polite, translating as "your slave, O lord" in literal.

==== Second person ====
There are three distinct forms of singular "you": kah (familiar), gata (standard), and droeneuh (polite). droeneuh is formed through combining droe, 'self' and the suffix -neuh. droeneuh can be used for both polite second and third person, though it's widely used to refer to the second person, to distinguish between the two, nyan, 'that' is commonly added when referring to the third person.

==== Third person ====
Alongside droeneuh nyan (polite), there are two other forms of s/he: jih (familiar) and gopnyan (standard). The word gopnyan is formed through combining gop, 'other person' and nyan, 'that', translating literally to "that other person". Another variant of gopnyan is götnyan through consonant assimilation of final -p and ny /ɲ/.

==== Plural forms ====
Acehnese pronouns, other than kèe, (geu)tanyoe, and kamoe, are ambiguous in quantity, there are various of ways to signify plurality in Acehnese:

- The demonstrative nyoe, 'this' may be used when addressing more than on person in the second person: gata nyoe, 'you all here'
- A plural quantifier, dum, 'all' may be used with all pronouns except kèe: kah dum, 'you (plural)'

Combined with demonstratives such as nyan, the noun awak, 'person' and ureueng, 'person' contains a plural sense by its own, and only sometimes acts as singular.

== Writing system ==
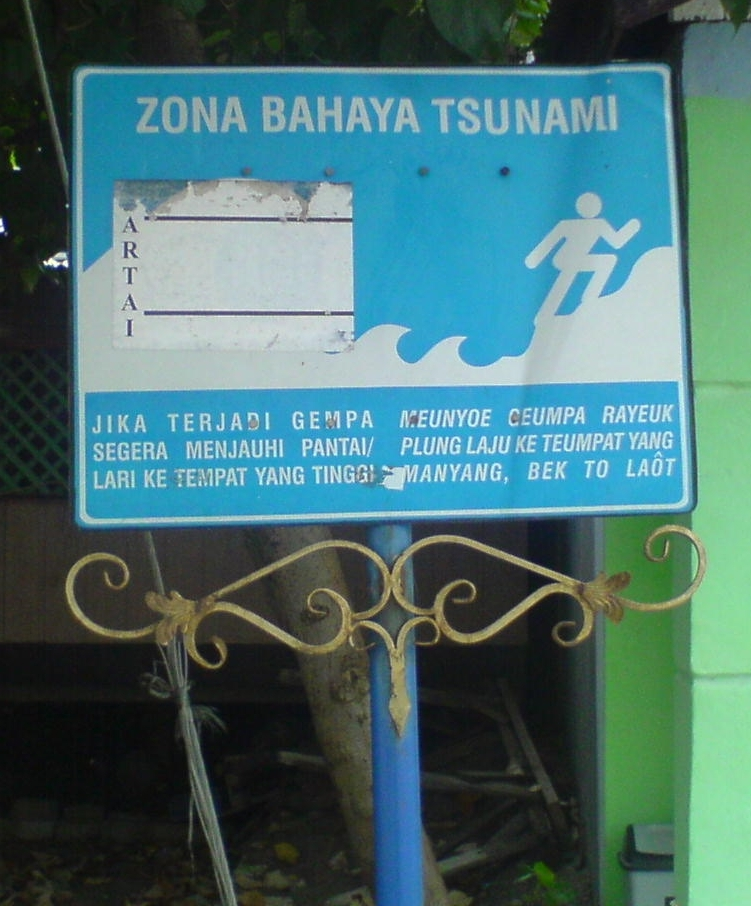
Bilingual tsunami warning sign in Indonesian and Acehnese, written in the EBAYD spelling

Acehnese is written using the Latin script, though no standard spelling has been officially rasterised or agreed upon yet and has largely gone unstandardised.

The de-facto standard Latin spelling system (Indonesian: Ejaan Bahasa Aceh yang Disempurnakan, lit. 'Improved Spelling of the Acehnese Language') is based on the Indonesian spelling system, Ejaan yang Disempurnakan. Another popular spelling system, Husaini's Spelling (Idjaan Husaini, 'Husaini's Spelling') is also used, popular amongst pro-independence members.

EBAYD and Husaini are almost the exact same, with the only difference being how they spell the palatal sounds and ⟨ë⟩, Husaini uses tj, dj, nj, j, and sj where EBAYD would use c, j, ny, y, and sy respectively. The grapheme ⟨ë⟩ is a remnant of Dutch spelling of Acehnese, notably to distinguish between oe /u/ and oë /ɔə̯/, and has mostly dropped out of use outside of the Husaini spelling, it's not officially listed as an official Acehnese glyph in EBAYD and is merged with ⟨e⟩.

The Acehnese alphabet contains 25 letters, using the basic Latin alphabet with 4 additional letters with diacritics: ⟨é⟩, ⟨è⟩, ⟨ô⟩, and ⟨ö⟩. The letters ⟨f⟩, ⟨q⟩, ⟨v⟩, ⟨x⟩, and ⟨z⟩ are not used. The diacritics used are based on the spelling system used by Snouck Hurgronje to write Acehnese, (Note: While the current diacritics are mostly based on Shouck's system, Shouck's system lacks the needed letters to differentiate /ʌ/ and /ɔ/ due to the dialect that Shouck studied has merged these phonemes, while most dialects of Aceh retained the distinction.) which is based on the French alphabet. Due to its inspiration from Snouck's orthography, the spelling system is also referred to as the Snouck's Spelling System colloquially. Acehnese additionally uses three digraphs: ⟨eu⟩, ⟨ng⟩, and ⟨ny⟩, as well as the apostrophe mark ⟨’⟩ preceding a vowel to indicate nasality. The grapheme ⟨k⟩ represents /ʔ/ at the end of syllables, and the grapheme ⟨h⟩ is used to indicate a breathy or murmured consonant when placed directly after one.

Before Dutch contact, the Acehnese modified the Jawi script to write their language, which itself is derived from the Perso-Arabic script. The adapted writing system called Jawoe is akin to a heterogramic writing system, where words are written in Malay or Arabic but read in its Acehnese equivalent. Since as early as 1888, there has been efforts to create a writing system based on the Latin alphabet for Acehnese, which culminated into the first semi-standardised system developed by Snouck Hurgronje in 1892, which was used by several Acehnese authors and publications until the end of World War II, after the Indonesian war of independence, Acehnese authors largely followed Indonesian spelling reforms and conventions. In 1966, efforts began to instating the Acehnese language into public use and school curriculums, which arises the need for a standardised spelling of Acehnese. This culminated into several seminars between educators and linguists from local universities, which was later perfected into EBAYD in 1980.

IPA	EBAYD	Husaini	IPA	EBAYD	Husaini	IPA	EBAYD	Husaini
/a/	A a		/l/	L l		Digraphs		
/b/	B b		/m/	M m		/ɯ/	Eu eu	
/c/	C c	Tj tj	/n/	N n		/ŋ/	Ng ng	
/d/	D d		/ɔ/	O o		/ɲ/	Ny ny	Nj nj
/ə/	E e	E e	/o/	Ô ô		Others		
/ə/	E e	Ë ë	/ʌ/	Ö ö		/◌̃/	’	
/e/	É é		/p/	P p		Non-native		
/ɛ/	È è		/r/	R r		/f/	F f	
/ɡ/	G g		/s/	S s		/q/	Q q	
/h/	H h		/t/	T t		/v/	V v	
/i/	I i		/u/	U u		/z/	Z z	
/ɟ/	J j	Dj dj	/w/	W w		/x/	Kh kh	
/k/, /ʔ/	K k		/j/	Y y	J j	/ʃ/	Sy sy	Sj sj

== Vocabulary ==
=== Numerals ===
Numbers	Acehnese	Eastern Cham	Indonesian
one	sa	sa	satu
two	dua	dua	dua
three	lhèe	klau	tiga
four	peuet	pat	empat
five	limöng	lamâ, limâ	lima
six	nam	nam	enam
seven	tujôh	tajuh	tujuh
eight	lapan	dalapan	delapan
nine	sikureueng	salapan	sembilan
ten	siplôh	sa pluh	sepuluh
hundred	reutôh	ratuh	ratus
thousand	ribèe	rabuw	ribu

=== Interrogative words ===
Acehnese	Indonesian	English translation
peue, pue	apa	what
soe	siapa	who
pajan	kapan	when
töh, siré	yang mana	which
pat	di mana	where
panè	dari mana	from where
ho	ke mana	to where
padum, padit	berapa	how many
pakri, paban	bagaimana	how
pakön	kenapa	why

== Sample text ==
The following texts are excerpts from the official translations of article 1 of the Universal Declaration of Human Rights in Acehnese, along with the original declaration in English.

- Acehnese text sample:

Husaini Spelling System:

Bandum ureuëng lahé deungon meurdéhka, dan deungon martabat dan hak njang saban. Ngon akai geuseumiké, ngon haté geumeurasa, bandum geutanjoë lagèë sjèëdara. Hak dan keumuliaan.

Improved Acehnese Spelling (EBAYD):

Bandum ureueng lahé deungön meurdéka, dan deungön martabat dan hak nyang saban. Ngön akai geuseumiké, ngön até geumeurasa, bandum geutanyoe lagèe cèedara. Hak dan keumuliaan.

Jawoe script:

بندوم اورڠ لاهير دڠن مرديک، دان دڠن مرتبت دان حق ڽڠ سابن. ڠن عقل ݢسميکير، ڠن هاتي ݢمراس، بندوم ڬتايو لاݢي ساودارا، حق دان کمولياءن.

- The original English version of the text:

All human beings are born free and equal in dignity and rights. They are endowed with reason and conscience and should act towards one another in a spirit of brotherhood.

== Gallery ==
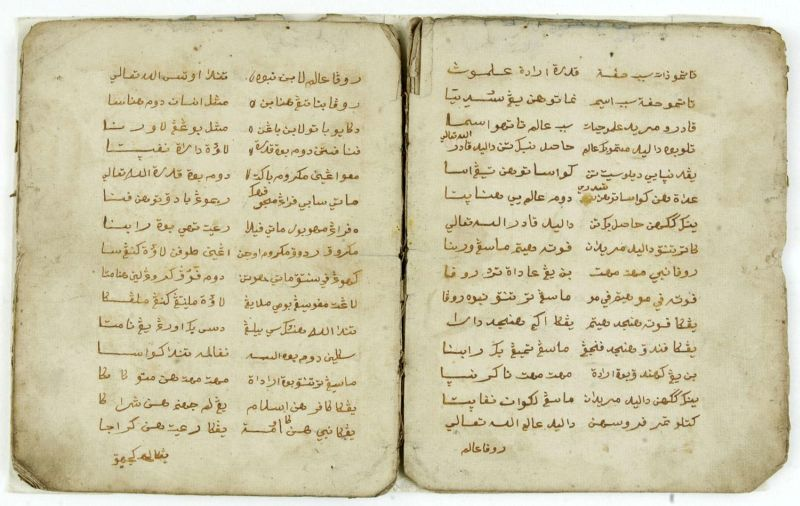
Hikayat Akhbarul Karim

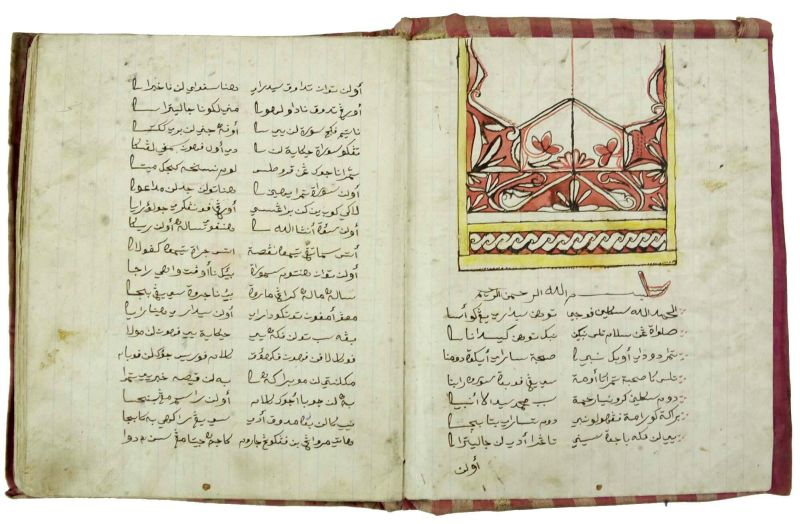
Hikayat Banta Beuransah

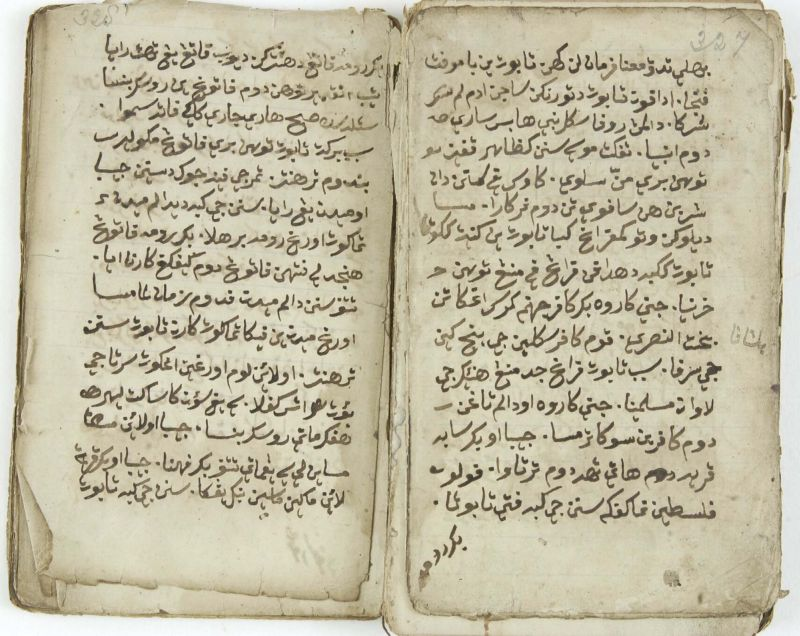
Hikayat Prang Sabi

== Bibliography ==
- Al-Harbi, Awwad Ahmad Al-Ahmadi (2003), "Acehnese coda condition: An optimality-theoretic account" (PDF), Umm Al-Qura University Journal of Educational and Social Sciences and Humanities, 15 (1): 9–21
- Asyik, Abdul Gani (1987). A Contextual Grammar of Acehnese Sentences (PDF) (PhD thesis). The University of Michigan. Archived from the original on 2011-07-24.
- Pillai, Stefanie; Yusuf, Yunisrina Qismullah (2012), "An instrumental analysis of acehnese oral vowels" (PDF), Language and Linguistics, 13 (6): 1029–1050, archived from the original (PDF) on 2017-10-11
- Asyik, Abdul Gani (1982), "The agreement system in Acehnese" (PDF), Mon-Khmer Studies, 11: 1–33, archived from the original (PDF) on 2012-02-20
- Durie, Mark (1985). A grammar of Acehnese: on the basis of a dialect of North Aceh. Verhandelingen van het Koninklijk Instituut voor Taal-, Land- en Volkenkunde 112. Dordrecht: Foris Publications. ISBN 90-6765-074-9.
- Durie, Mark (1988a). "The So-Called Passive of Acehnese". Language. 64 (1): 104–113. doi:10.2307/414788. JSTOR 414788.
- Lawler, John M. (1977). "A Agrees with B in Achenese: A Problem for Relational Grammar". In Cole, P.; Sacock, J. (eds.). Grammatical Relations. Syntax and Semantics 8. New York: Academic Press. pp. 219–248. doi:10.1163/9789004368866_010.
- Zulfadli (2014). A Sociolinguistic Investigation of Acehnese with a Focus on West Acehnese: A Stigmatised Dialect (Bachelor of Education thesis). University of Adelaide.
- Muthalib, Kismullah Abdul (2017). Dialect features of Leupueng children: a study of dialect in post tsunami Aceh (PhD thesis). Syiah Kuala University.
- Wildan (2010). Kaidah Bahasa Aceh [The Principles of the Acehnese Language] (PDF) (in Indonesian) (1st ed.). Banda Aceh: Geuci. ISBN 978-979-96655-3-9.
- Sulaiman, Budiman (1977). Bahasa Aceh [The Acehnese Language] (PDF) (in Indonesian). Vol. 1. Banda Aceh.
- Cowan, H. K. J. (1981). "An Outline of Achehnese Phonology and Morphology". Bulletin of the School of Oriental and African Studies. 44 (3): 522–549.
- Yusuf, Yunisrina Qismullah; Aziz, Zulfadli A.; Mustafa, Faisal; Khatimah, Husnul (2022). "The unique accent features of the stigmatized Greater Aceh subdialect in Sibreh, Aceh, Indonesia". International Journal of Language Studies. 16 (2): 143–164. eISSN 2157-4901. ISSN 2157-4898.
- Irnanda, Septhia; Muliawati, Ida; Yulsafli, Yulsafli; Muthalib, Kismullah Abdul; Inayah, Nurul (2024). "The Acehnese Numerals in the Aceh Jaya District". Journal of Linguistics and Education. 14 (2): 43–55.
- Daud, Bukhari (1997a). Writing and reciting Acehnese: perspectives on language and literature in Aceh (PhD thesis). The University of Melbourne. hdl:11343/37197.
- Durie, Mark (1984). A grammar of Acehnese (PhD thesis). Australian National University. doi:10.25911/5d6fa25bcc31c. hdl:1885/138059.
- Alamsyah, Teuku; Razali; Munawar, Teuku; Ramli (2024), "Variants and social interaction: A study of the Acehnese Daya Dialect", Studies in English Language and Education, 11 (2): 1118–1136
