= List of Indonesian flags =

This is a list of Indonesian flags containing images and information about the official Indonesian flags used, and other historical flags.

== National flag ==
Flag	Date	Use	Description
	17 August 1945 – present	National flag and national ensign	A horizontal bicolor of red and white
	17 August 1945 – present	Banner	A vertical bicolor of red and white

== Governmental flags ==
=== Presidential ===
Presidential standard of the president of the Republic of Indonesia

=== Ministries ===
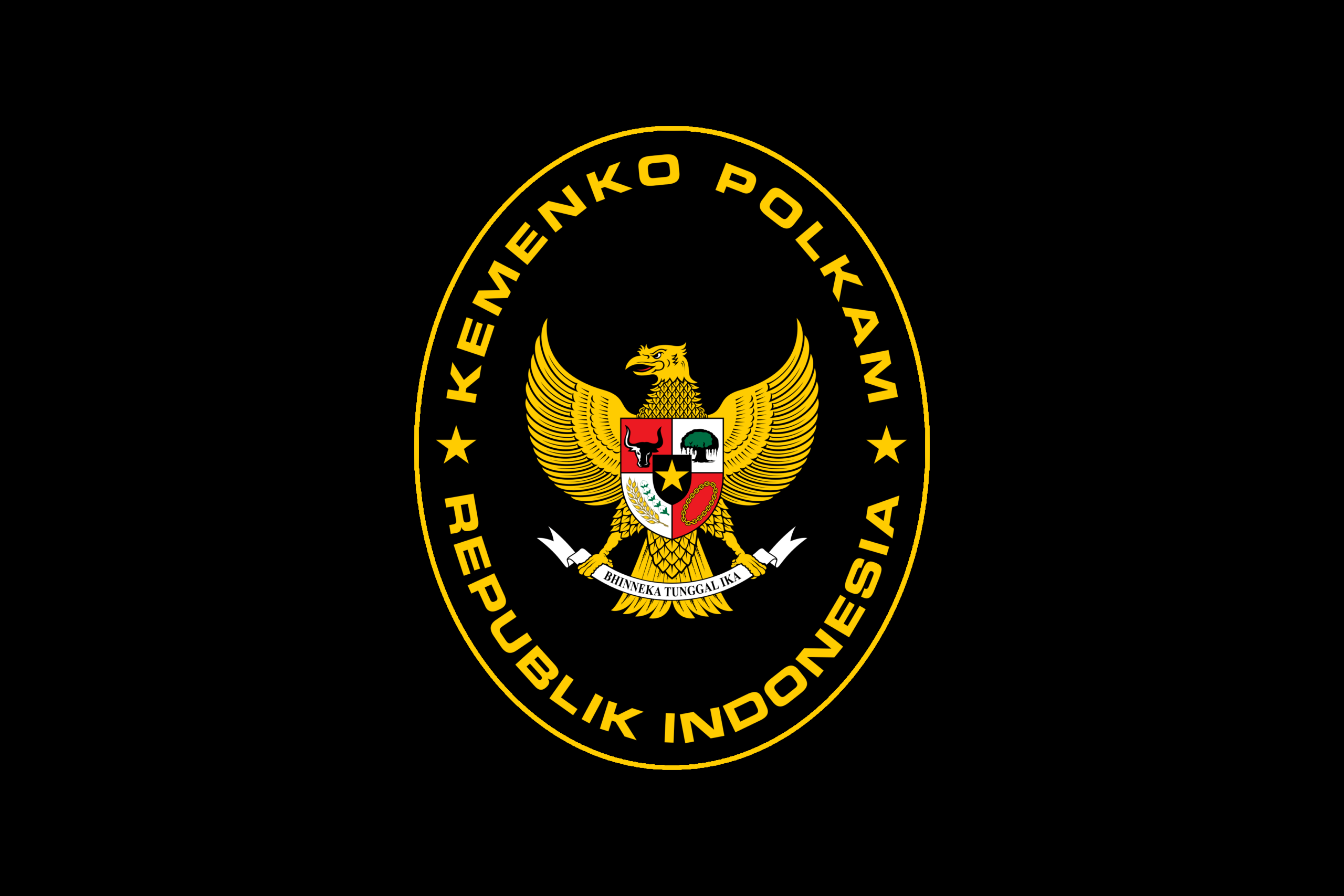
Coordinating Ministry for Political and Security Affairs

Coordinating Ministry for Legal, Human Rights, Immigration, and Correction

Coordinating Ministry for Human Development and Cultural Affairs

Ministry of Home Affairs

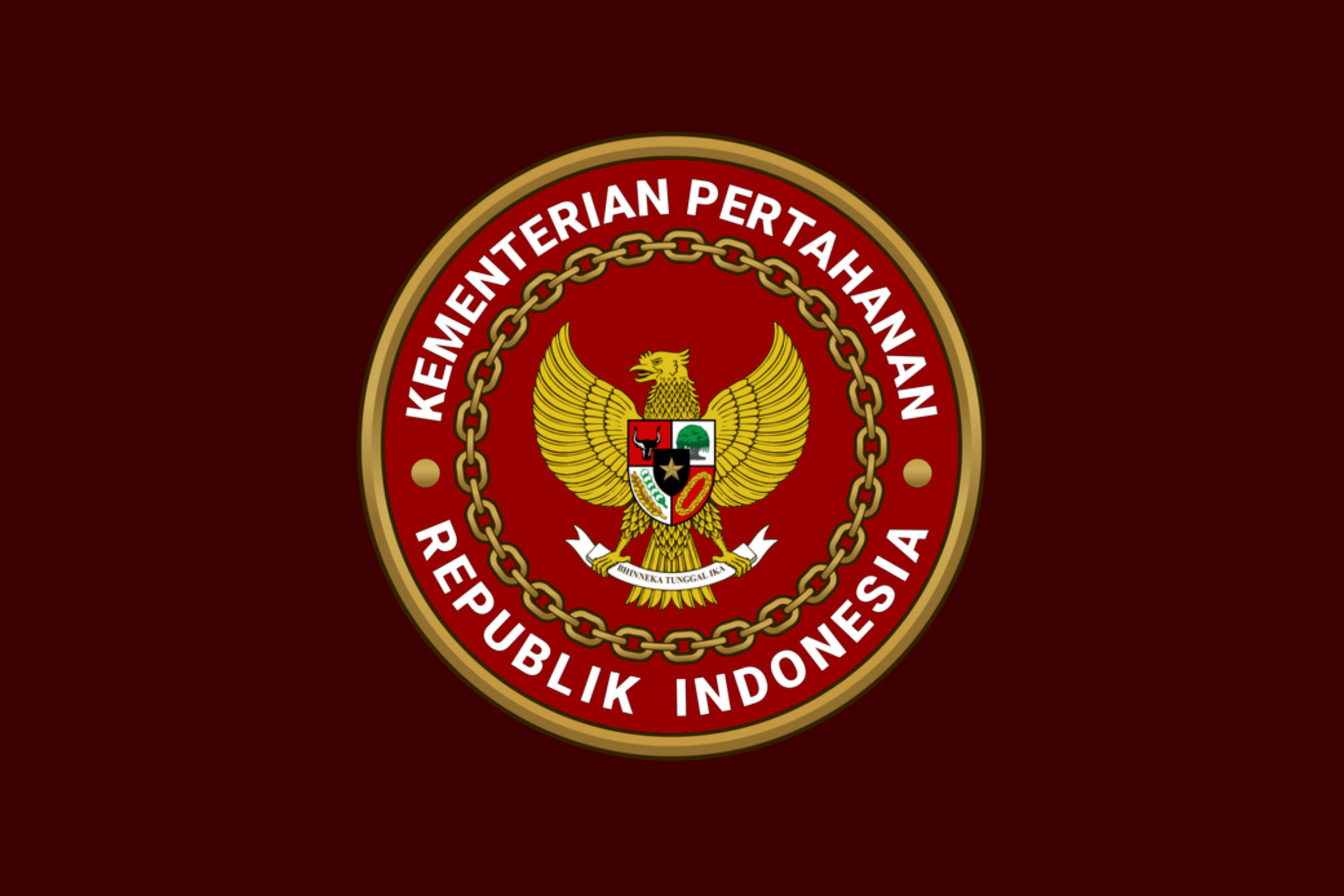
Ministry of Defense

Ministry of Law

Ministry of Energy and Mineral Resources

Ministry of Industry

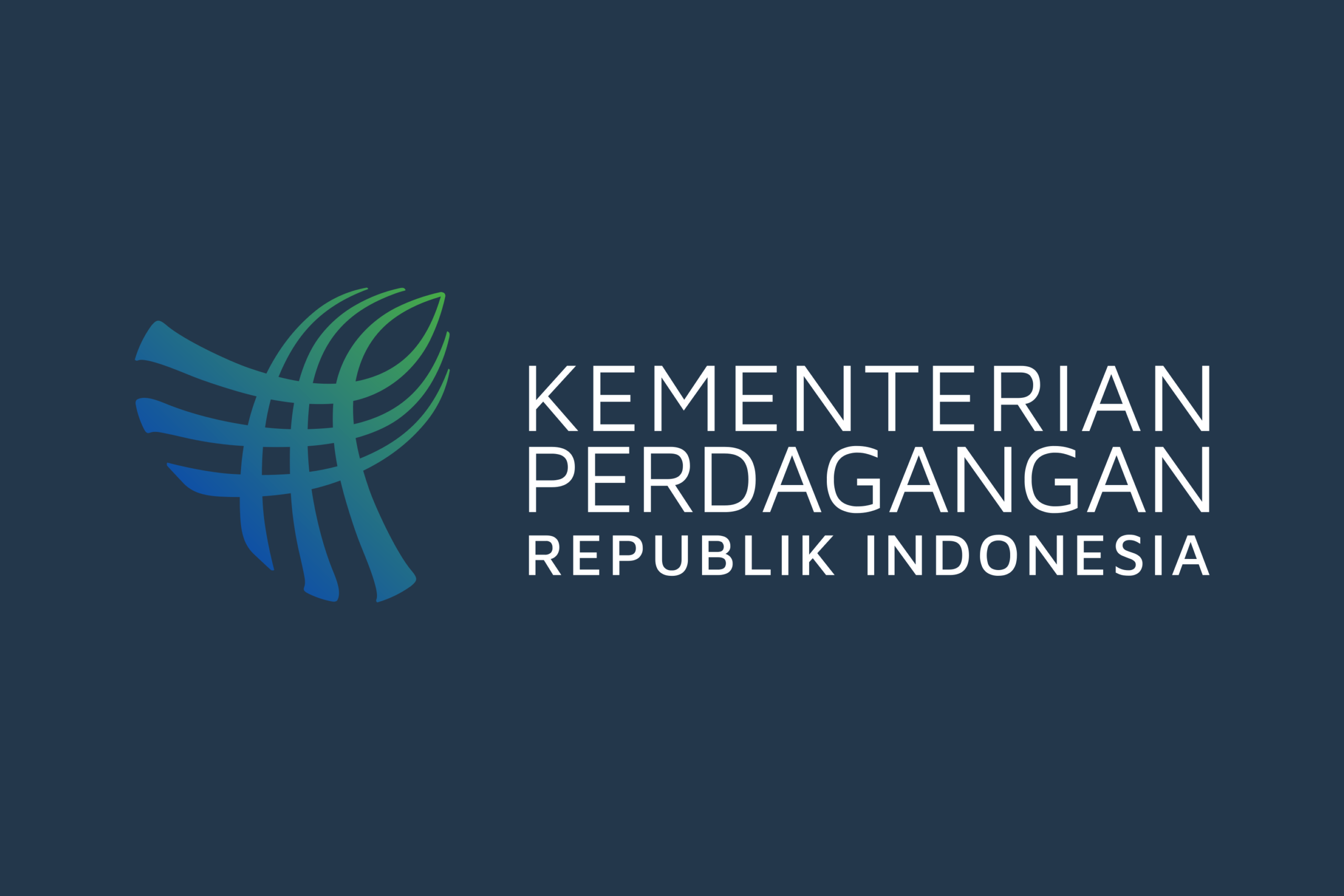
Ministry of Trade

Ministry of Agriculture

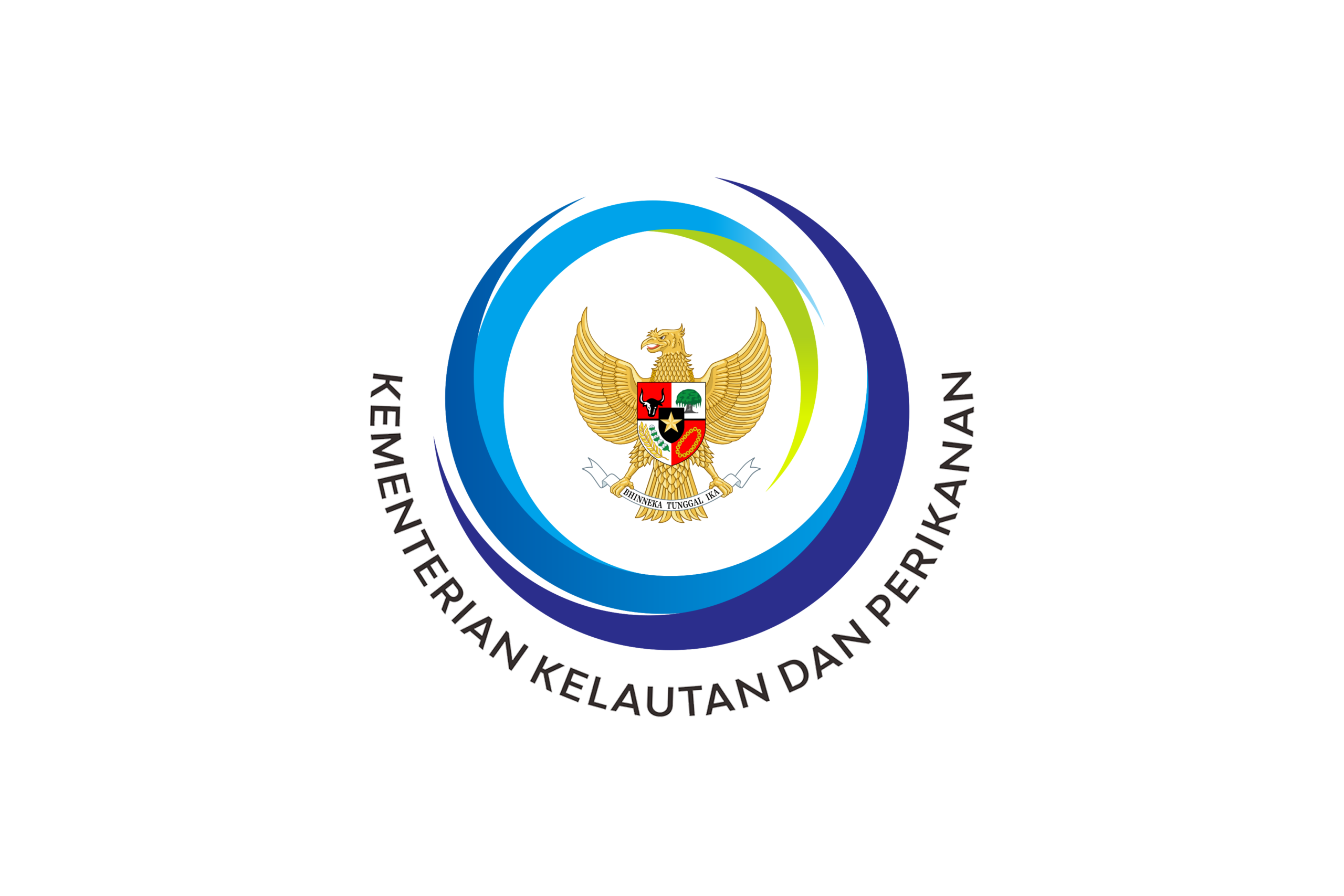
Ministry of Marine Affairs and Fisheries

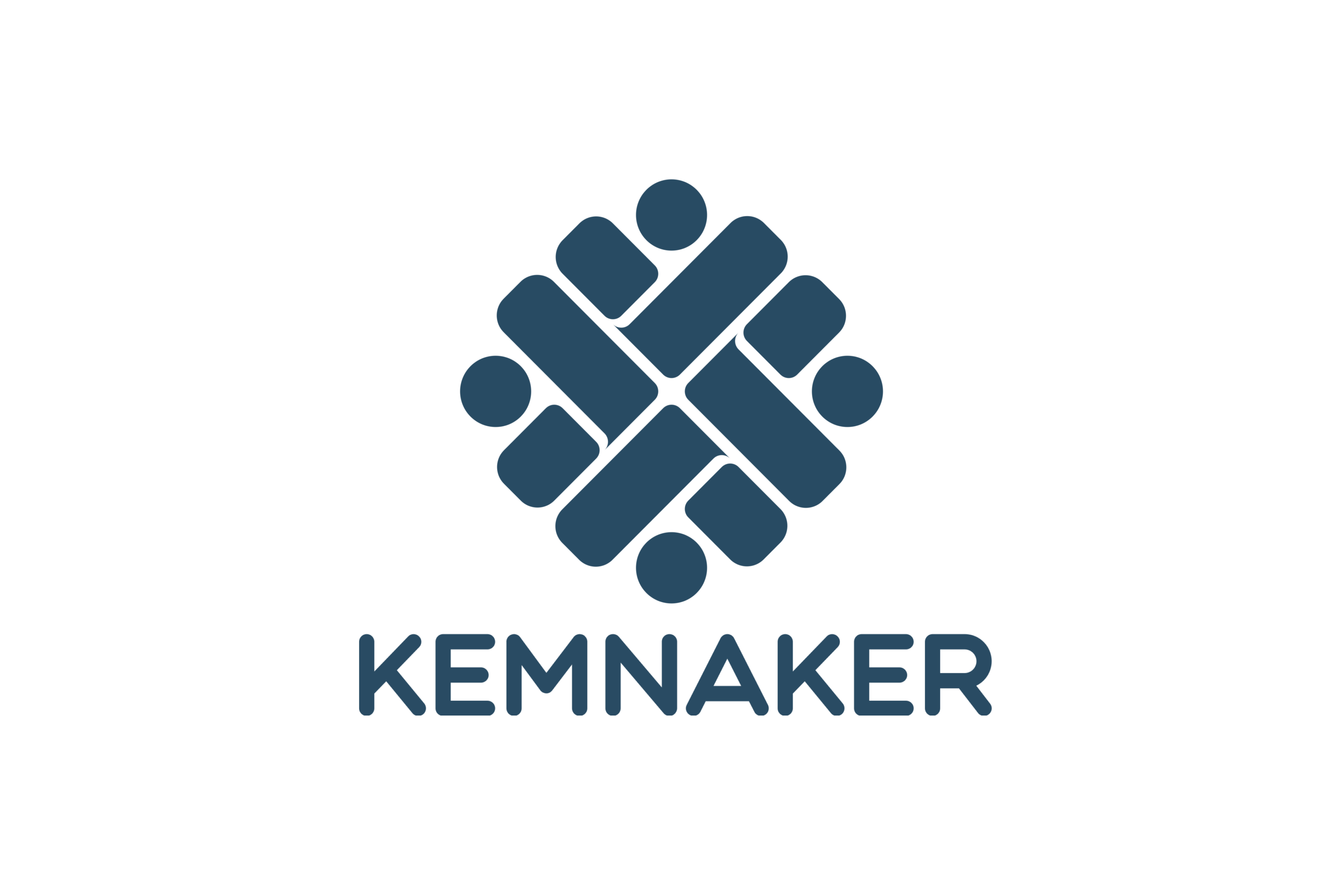
Ministry of Manpower

Ministry of Villages and Development of Disadvantaged Regions

Ministry of Health

Ministry of Primary and Secondary Education

Ministry of Higher Education, Science and Technology

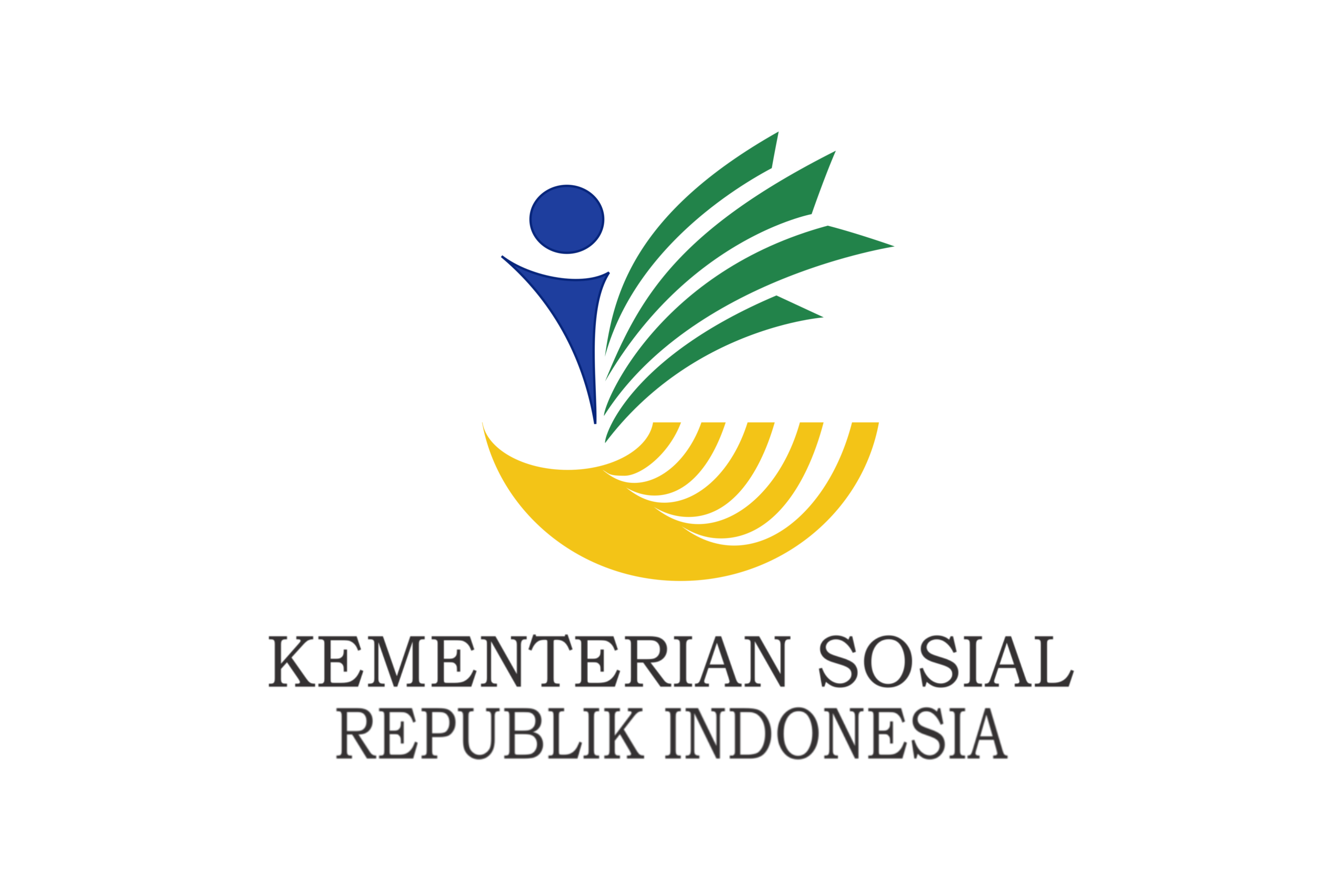
Ministry of Social Affairs

Ministry of Religious Affairs

Ministry of Communication and Digital Affairs

Ministry of Cooperatives

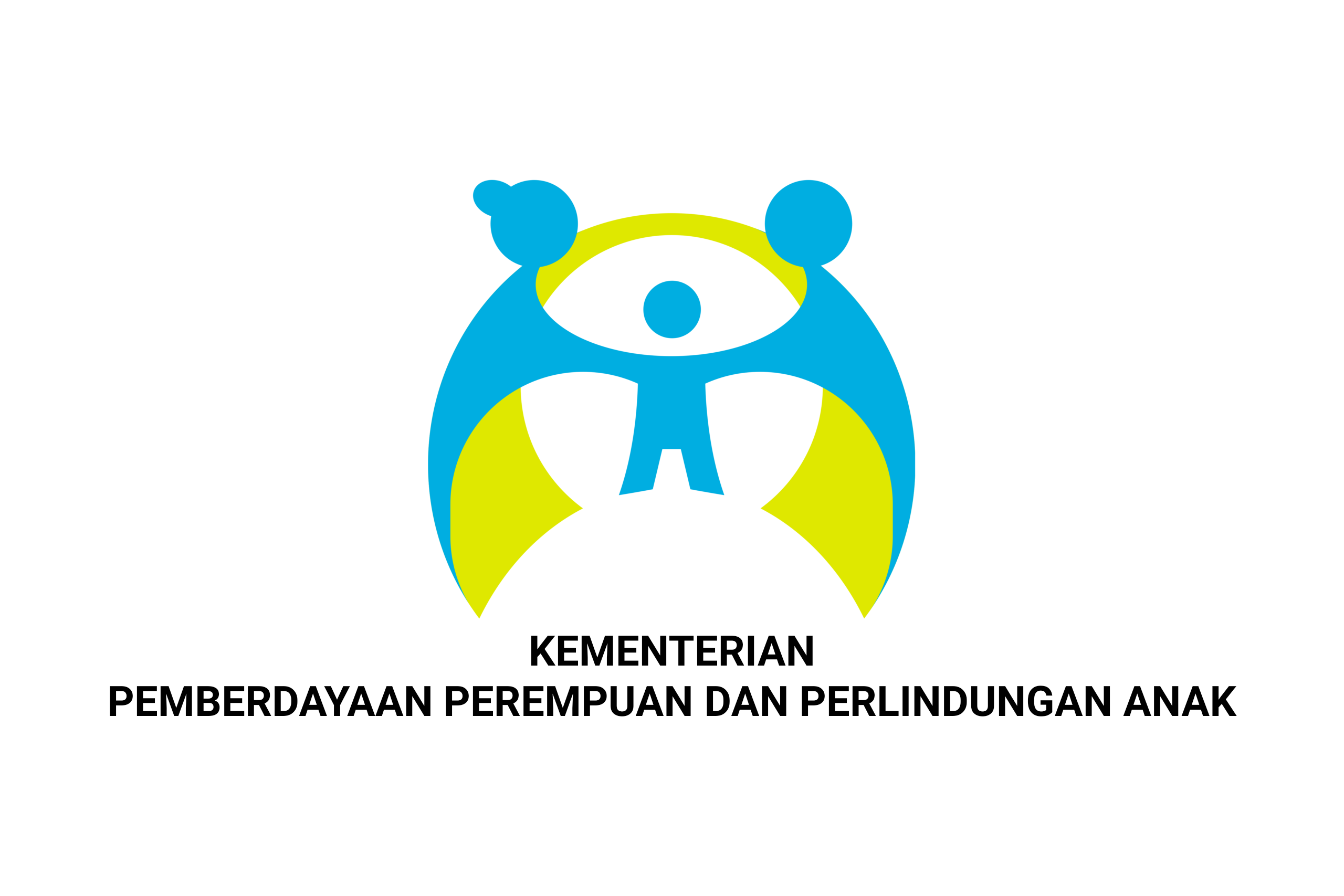
Ministry of Women Empowerment and Child Protection

Ministry of Culture

Ministry of State Apparatus Utilization and Bureaucratic Reform (black version)

Ministry of State Apparatus Utilization and Bureaucratic Reform (red version)

Ministry of Agrarian Affairs and Spatial Planning

Ministry of State Owned Enterprises

Ministry of Tourism

=== Government agencies ===
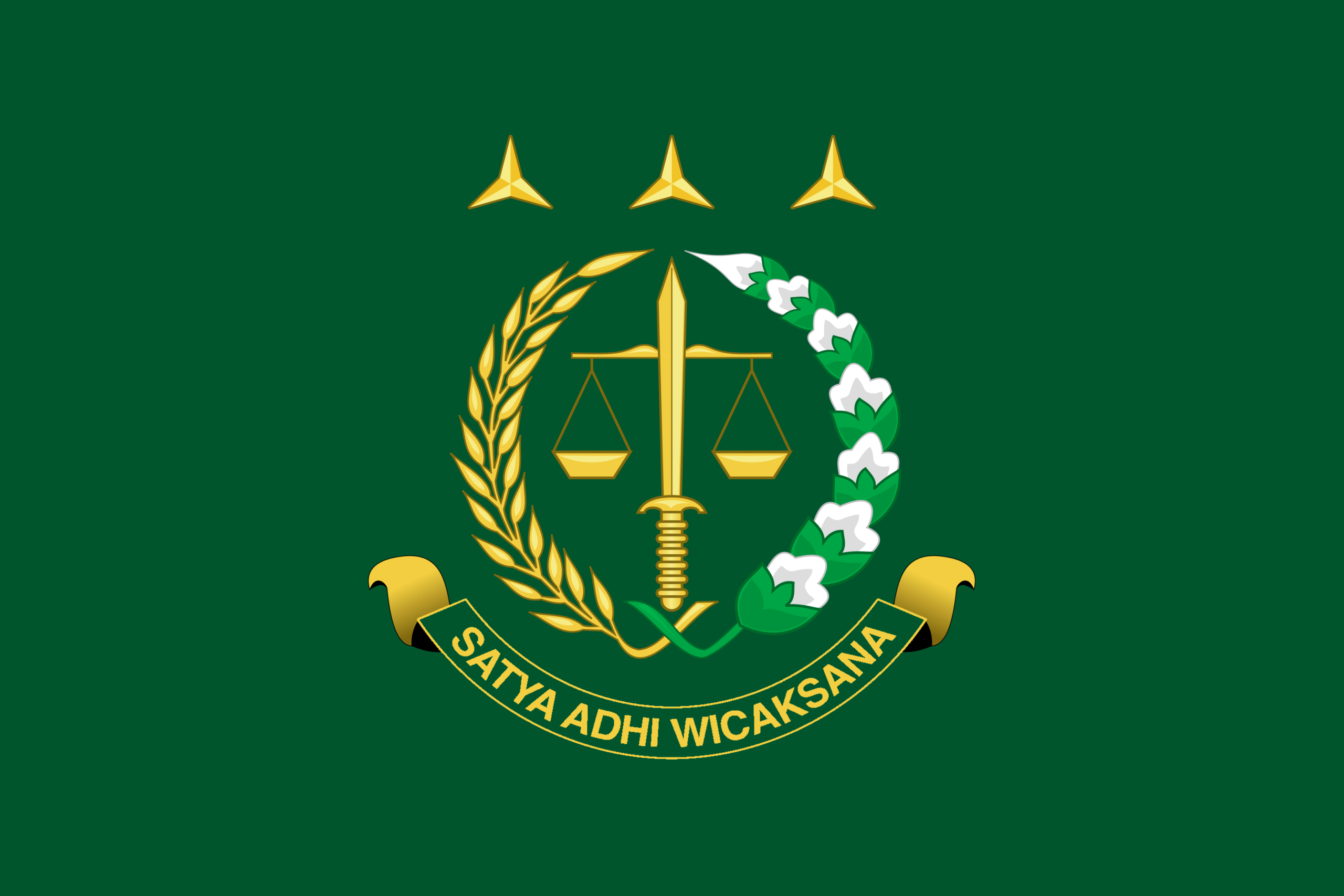
Public Prosecution Service

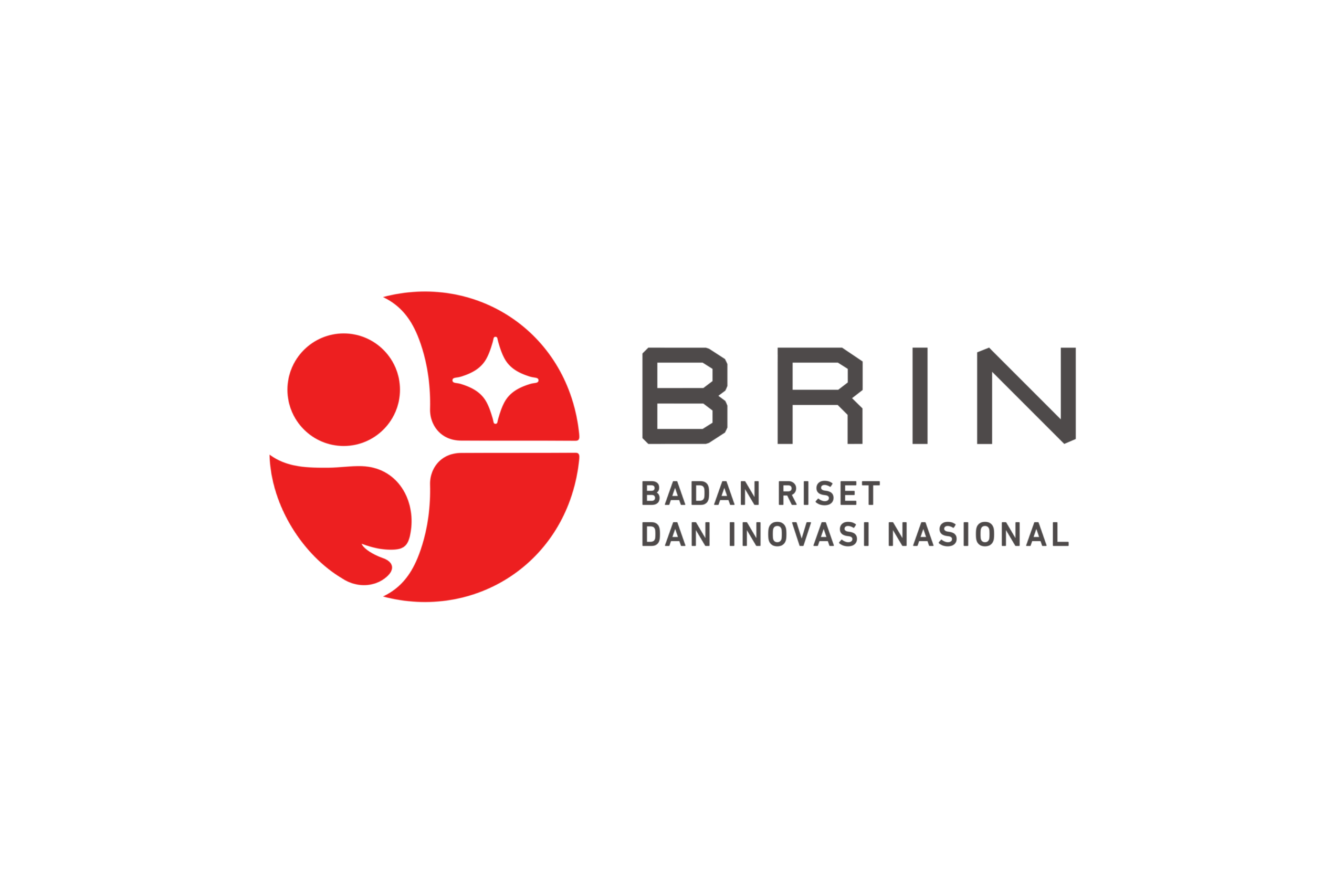
National Research and Innovation Agency

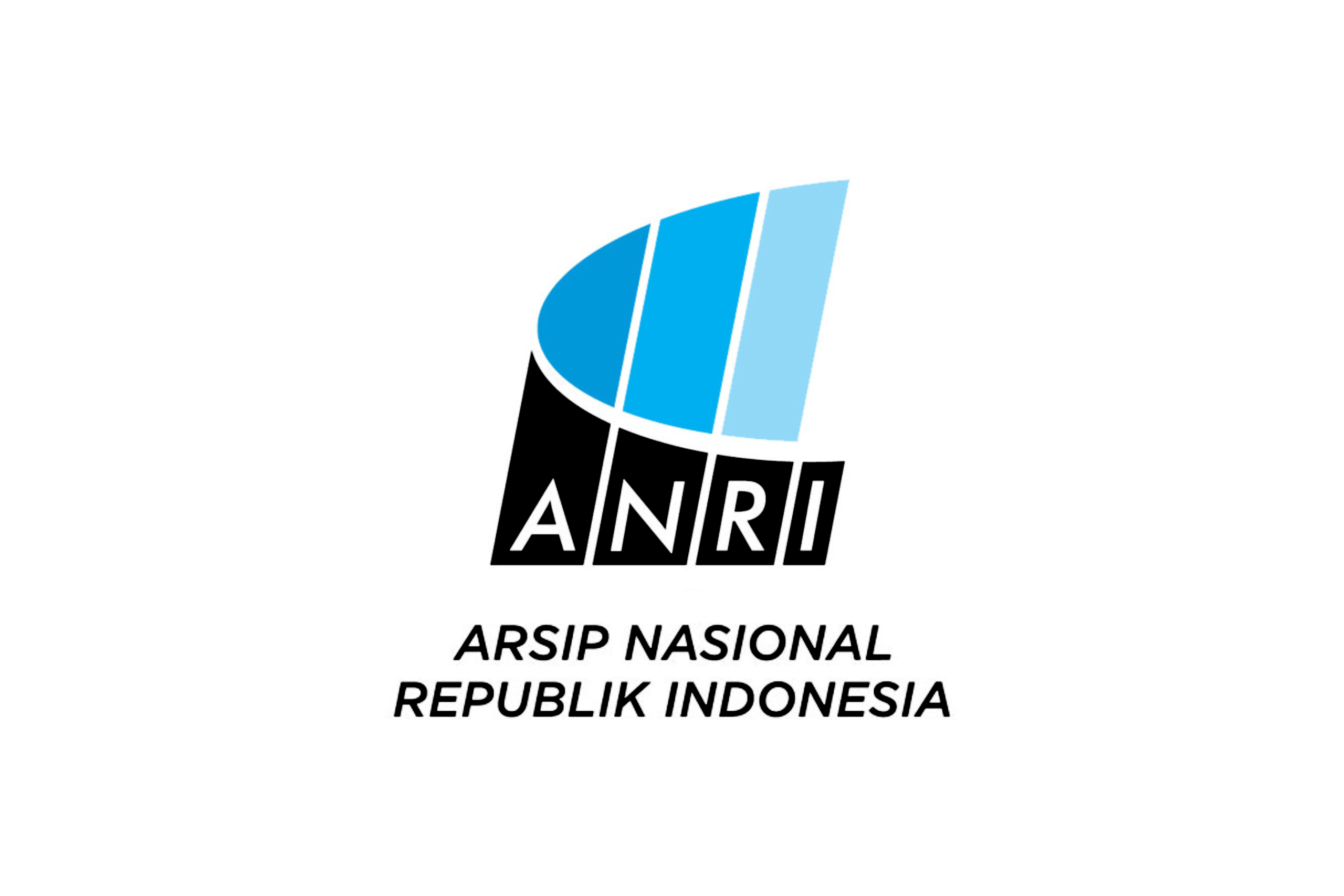
National Archives of Indonesia

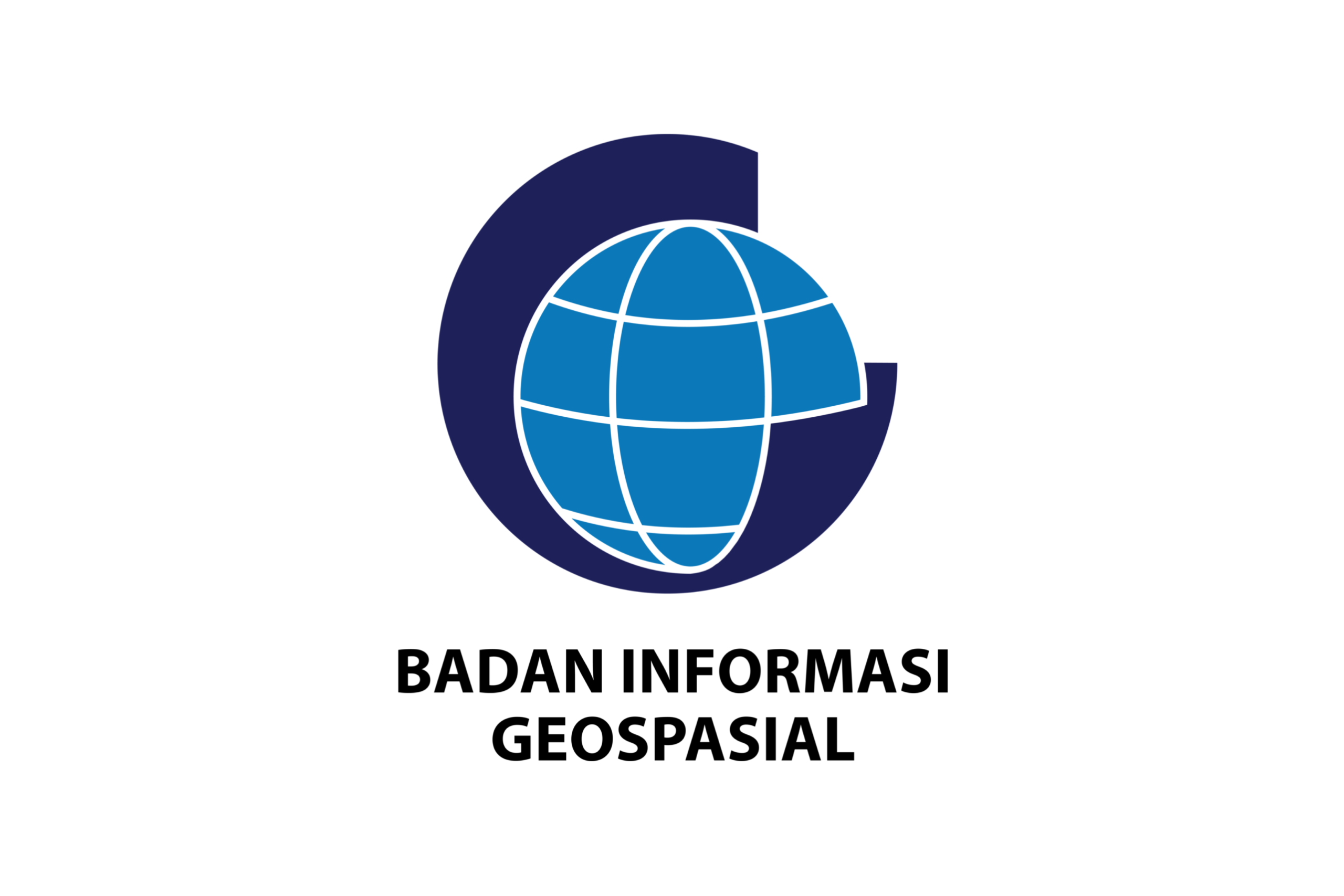
Geospatial Information Agency

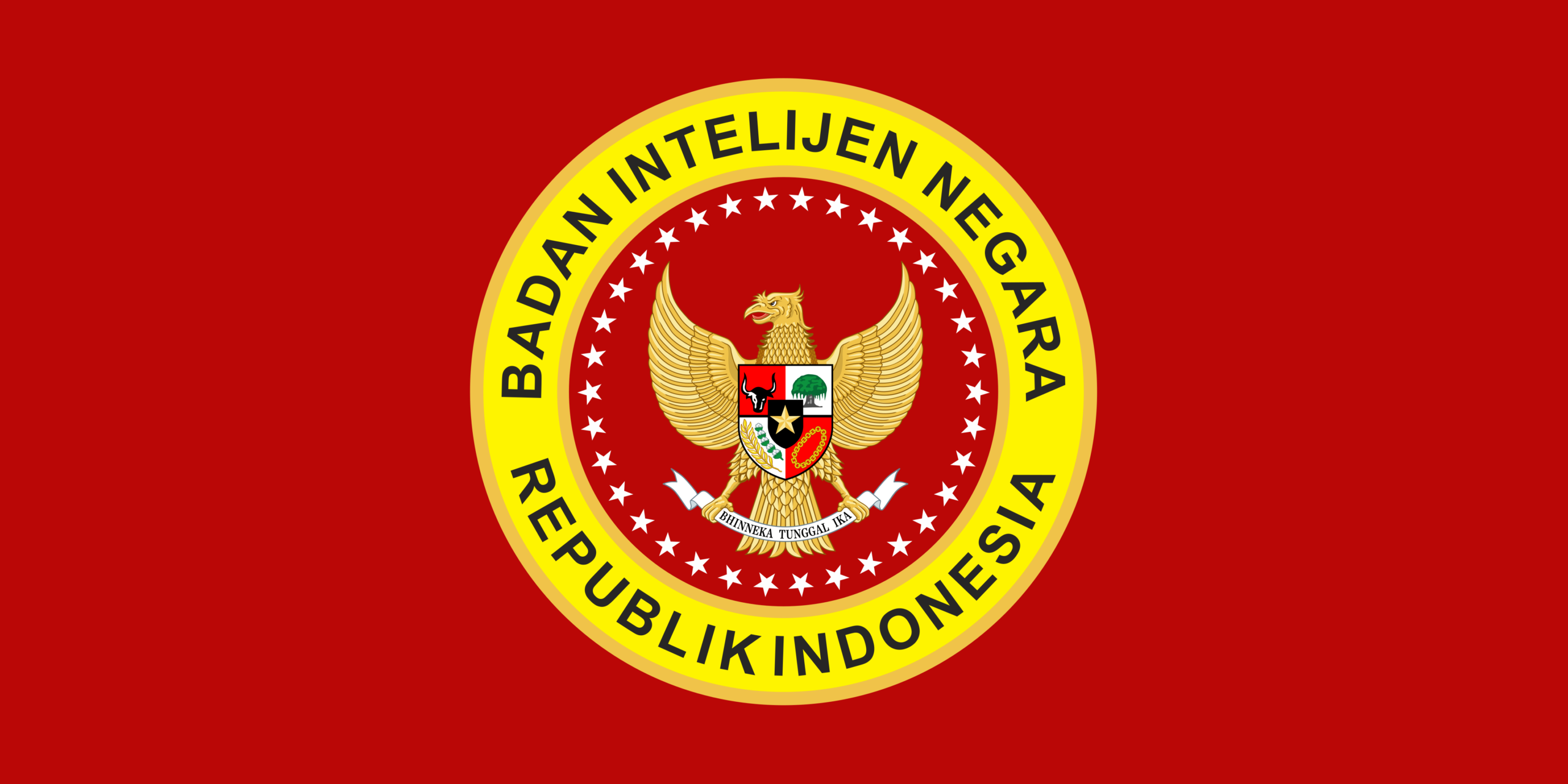
State Intelligence Agency

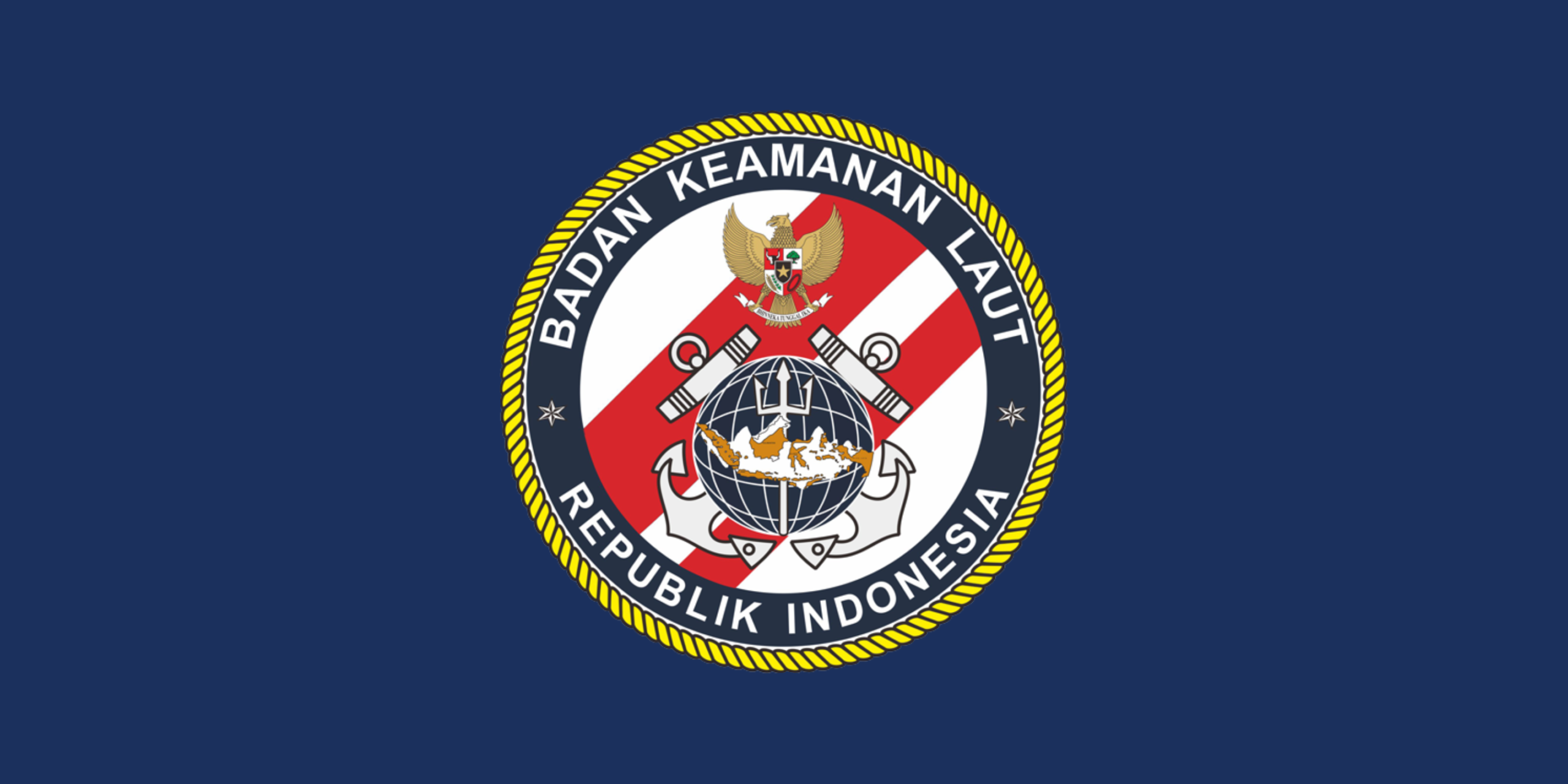
Indonesian Maritime Security Agency

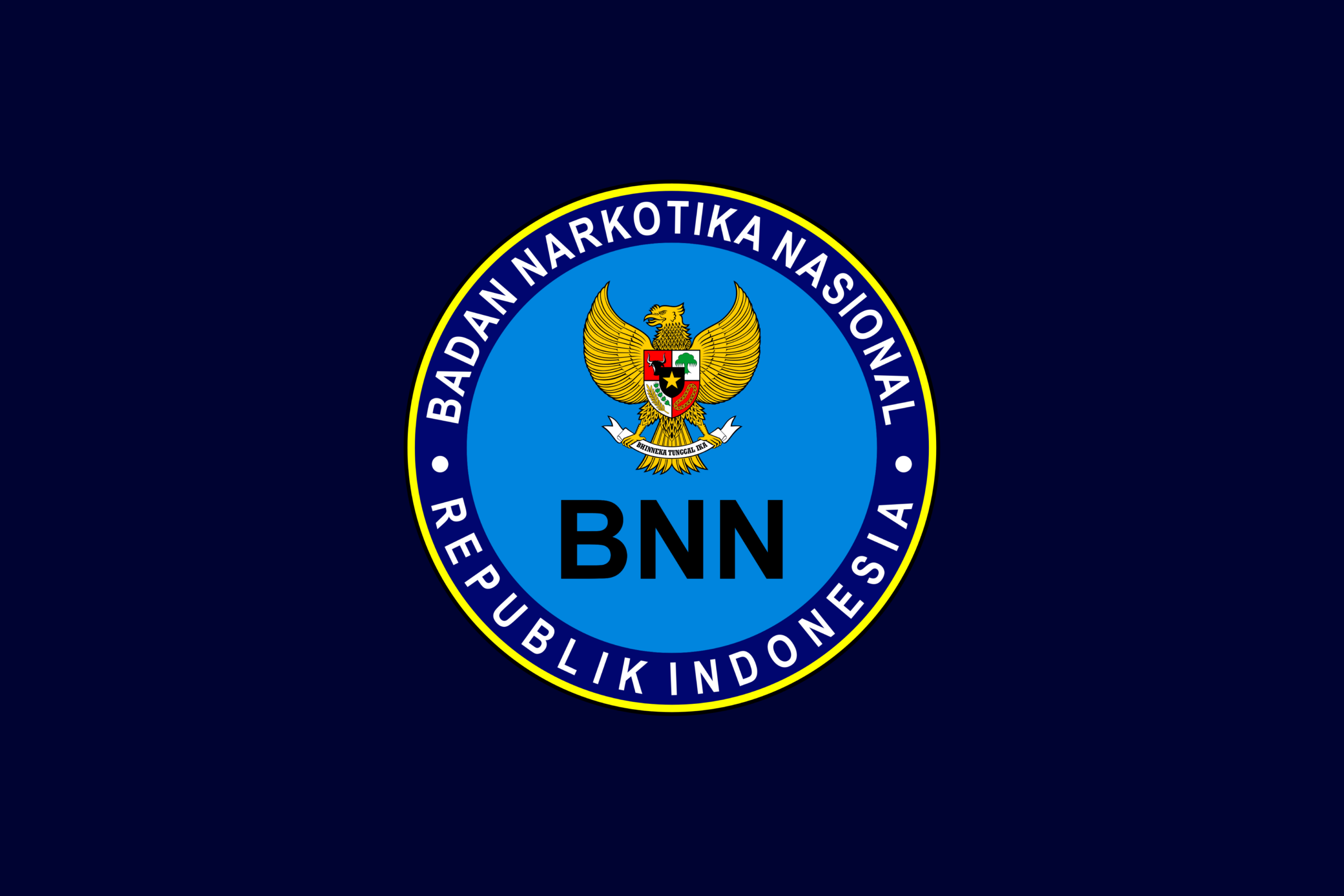
National Narcotics Board

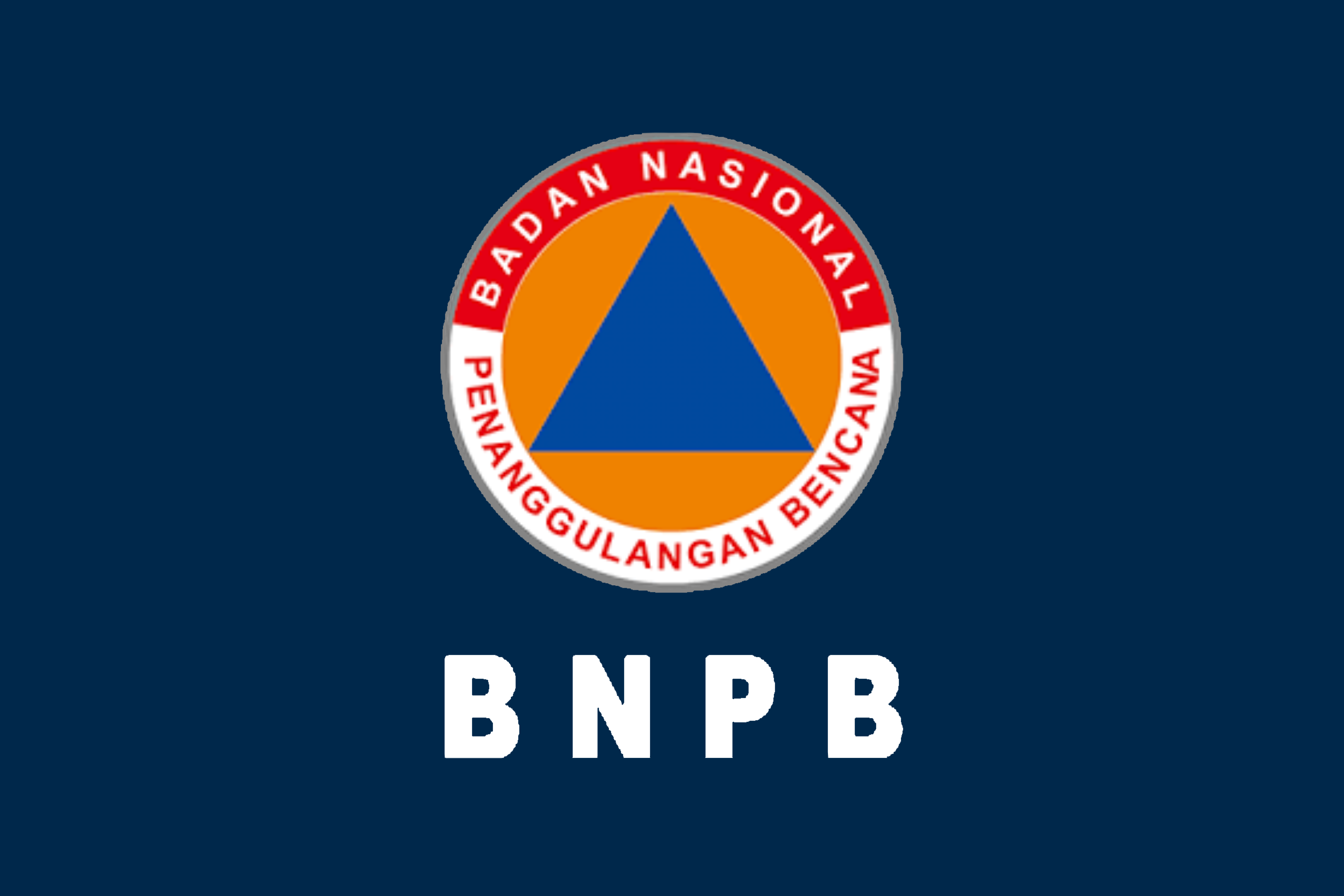
National Agency for Disaster Countermeasure

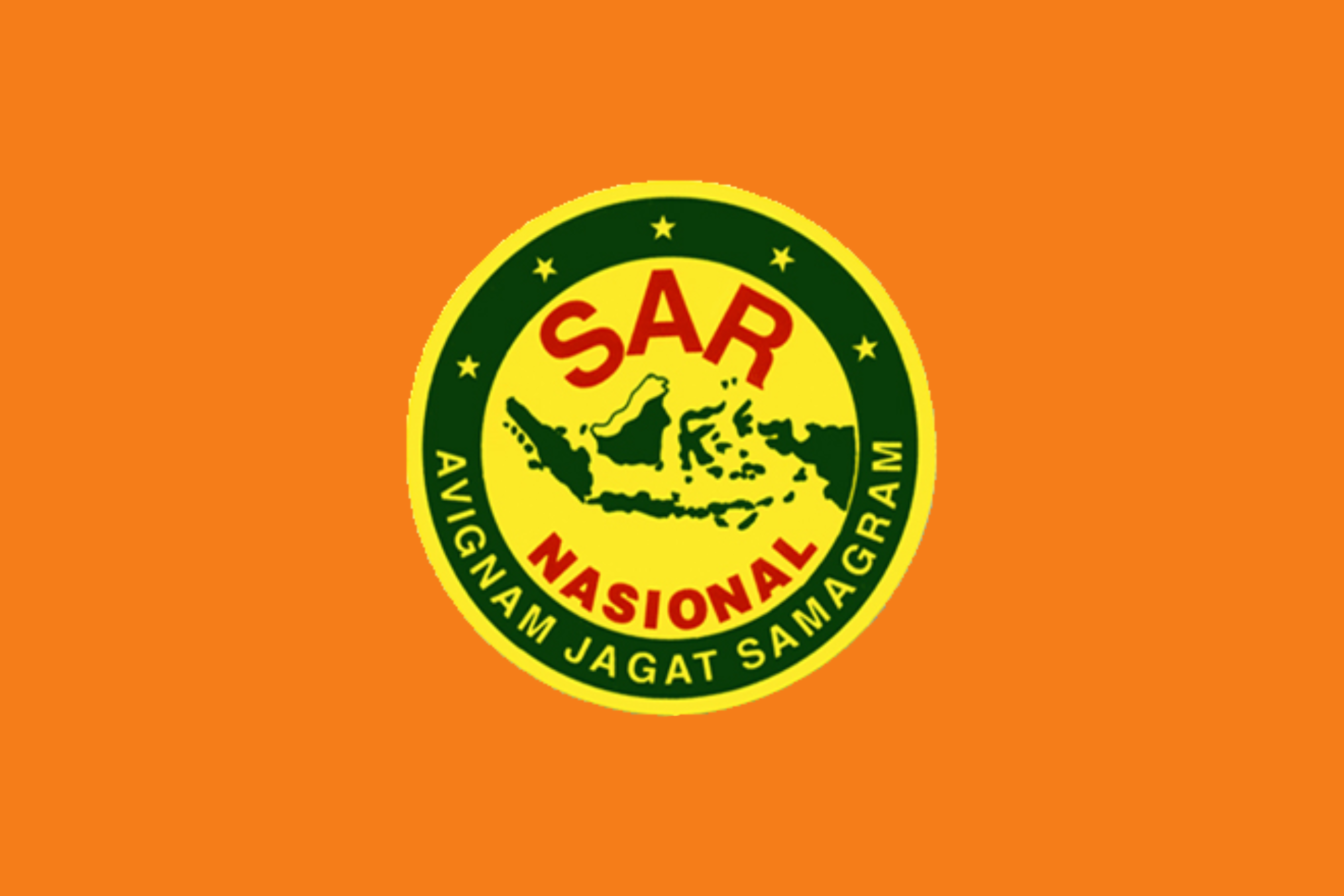
National Search and Rescue Agency

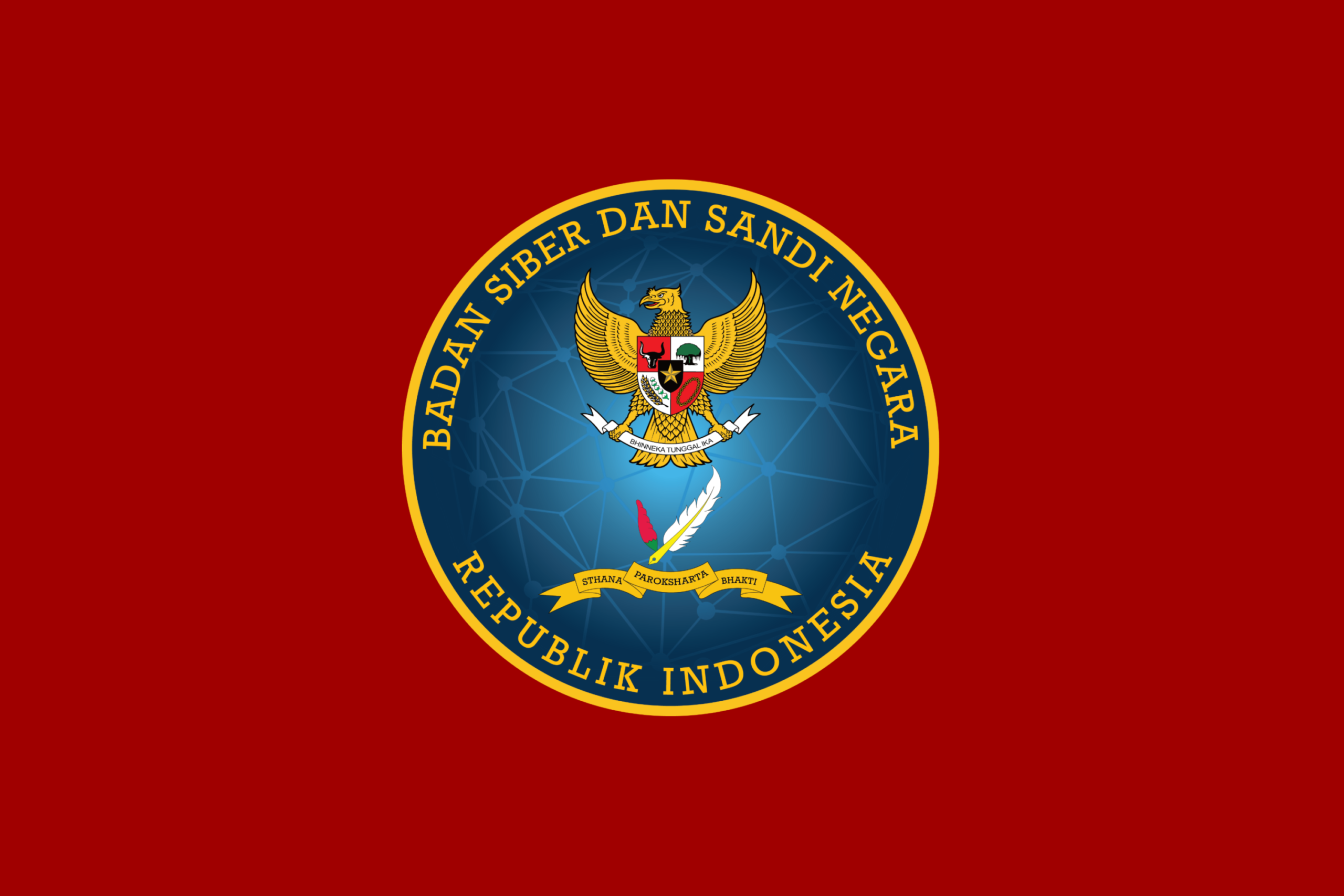
National Cyber and Crypto Agency

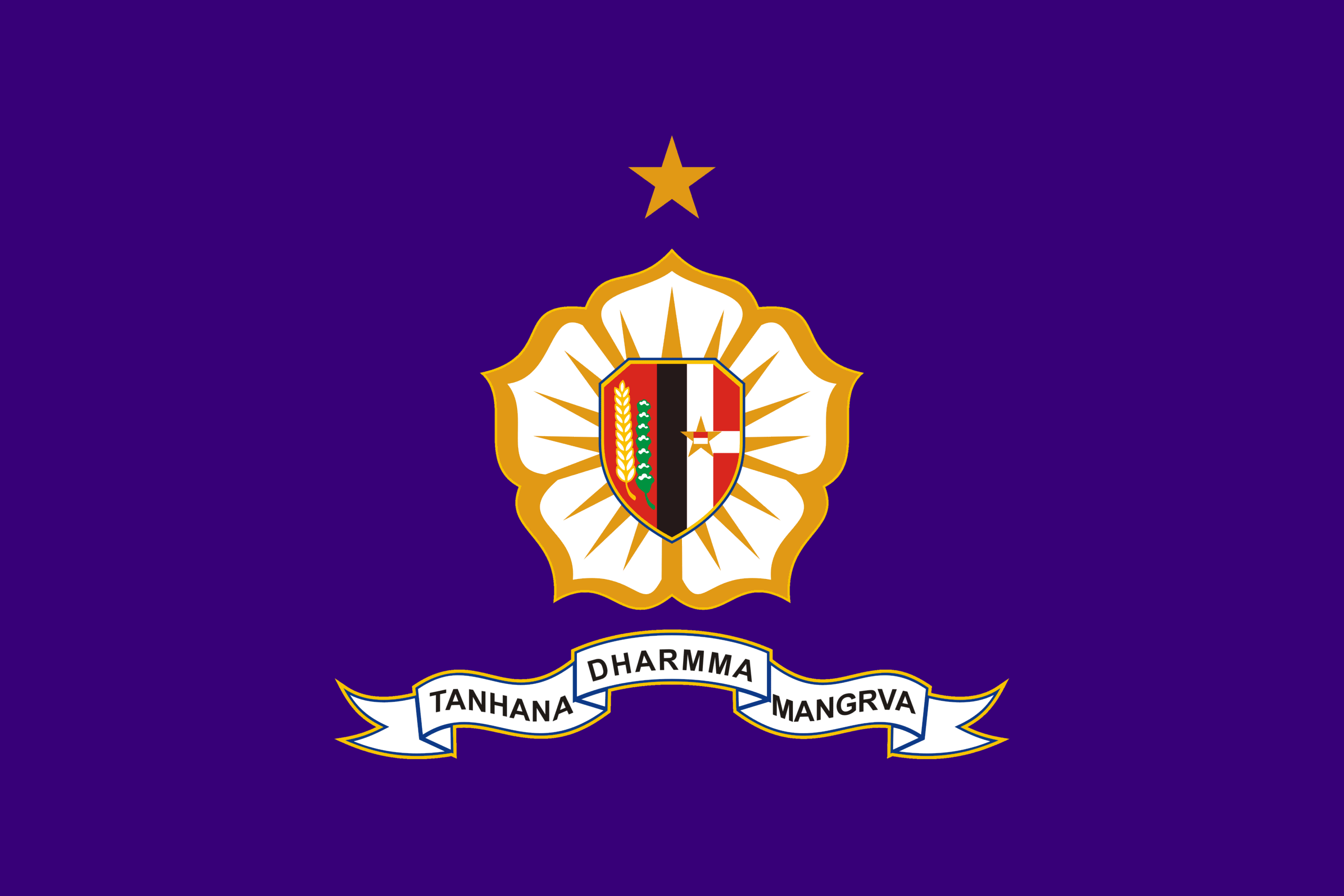
National Resilience Institute

Danantara

=== Miscellaneous ===
Practice flag to replace the National flag during rehearsals such as for the flag hoisting ceremony

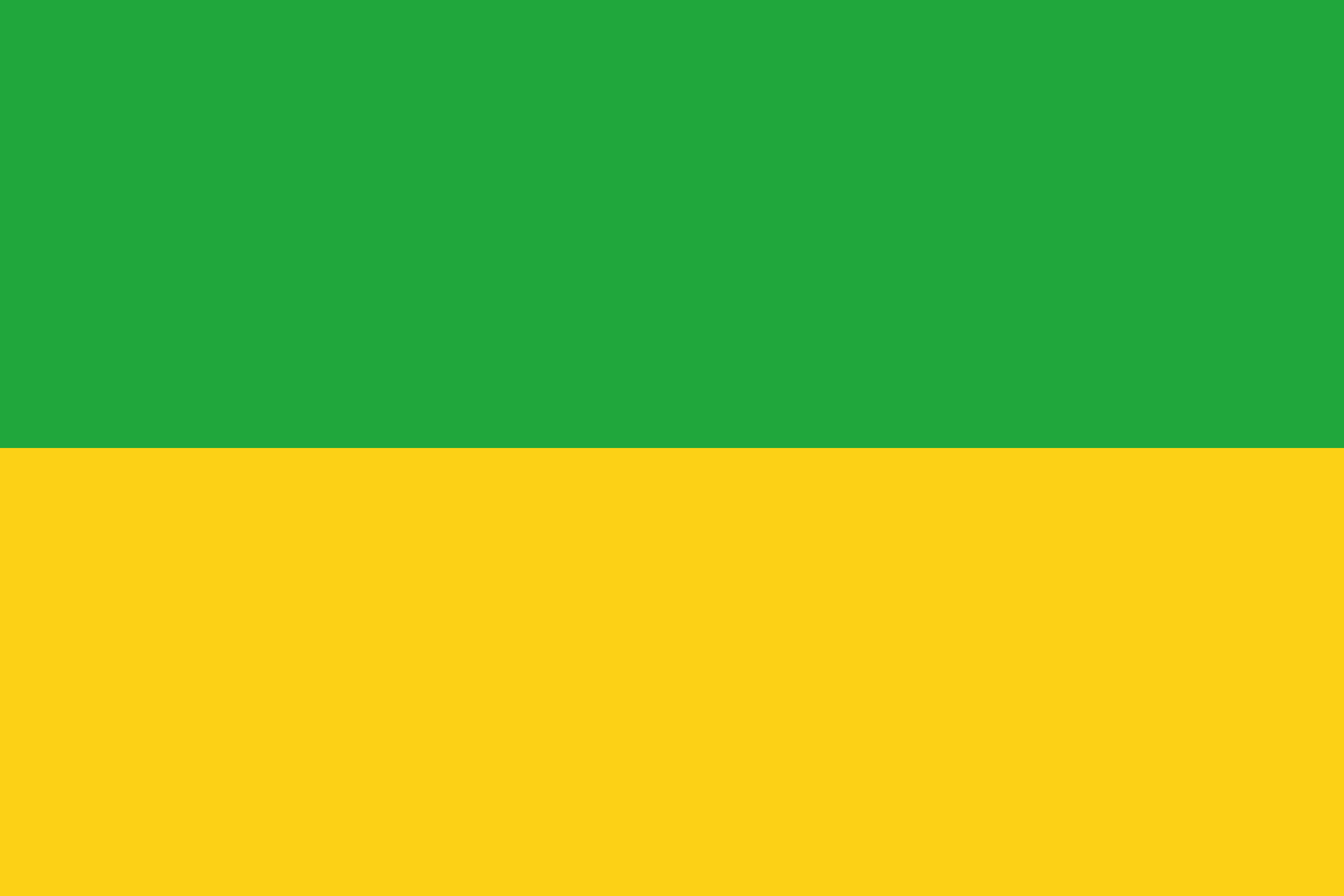
Another variant of the practice flag used uncommonly in local districts or schools

== Military flags ==
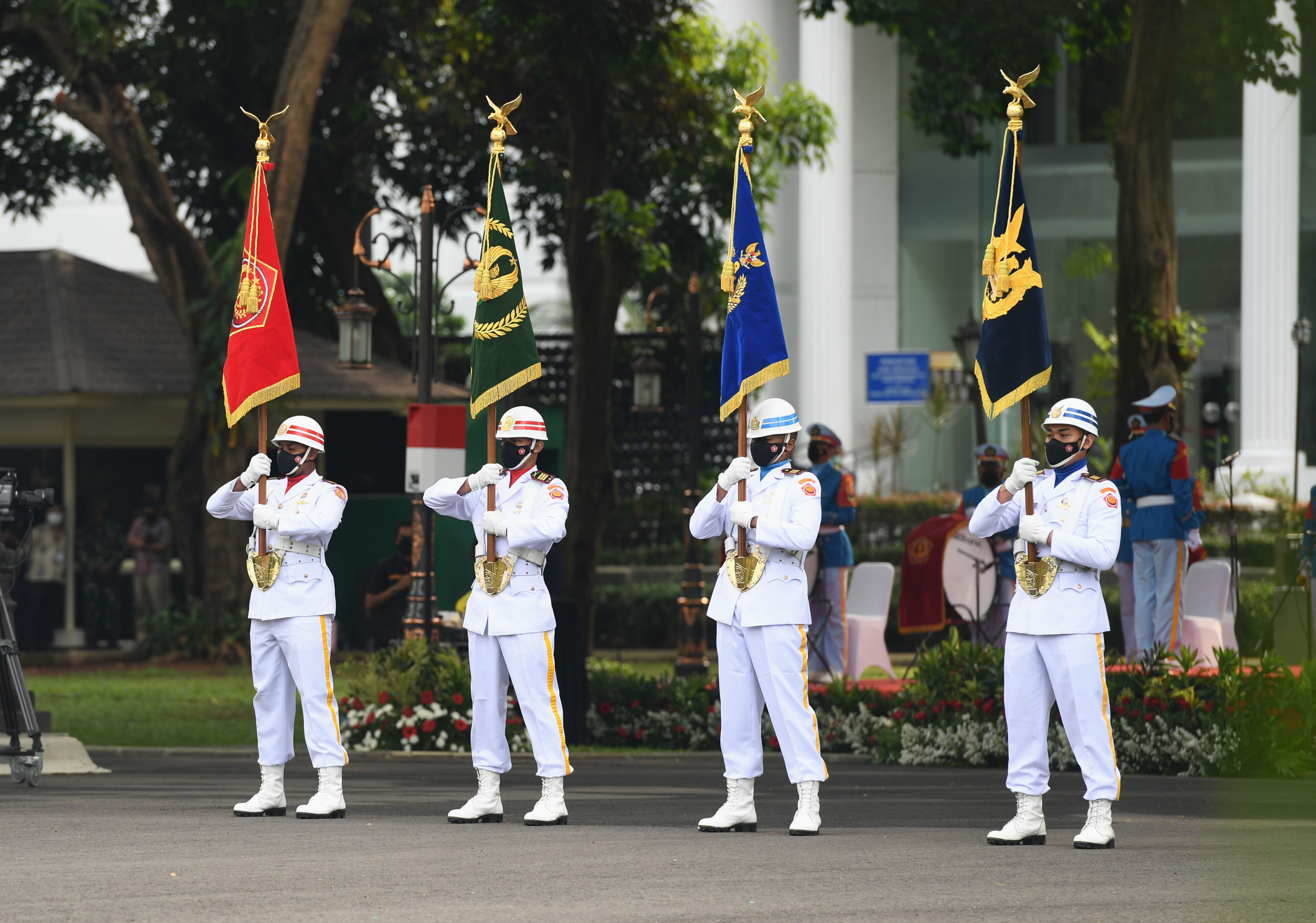
Indonesian military colors, during a ceremony commemorating the 76th anniversary of the Indonesian National Armed Forces at Merdeka Palace courtyard, 2021

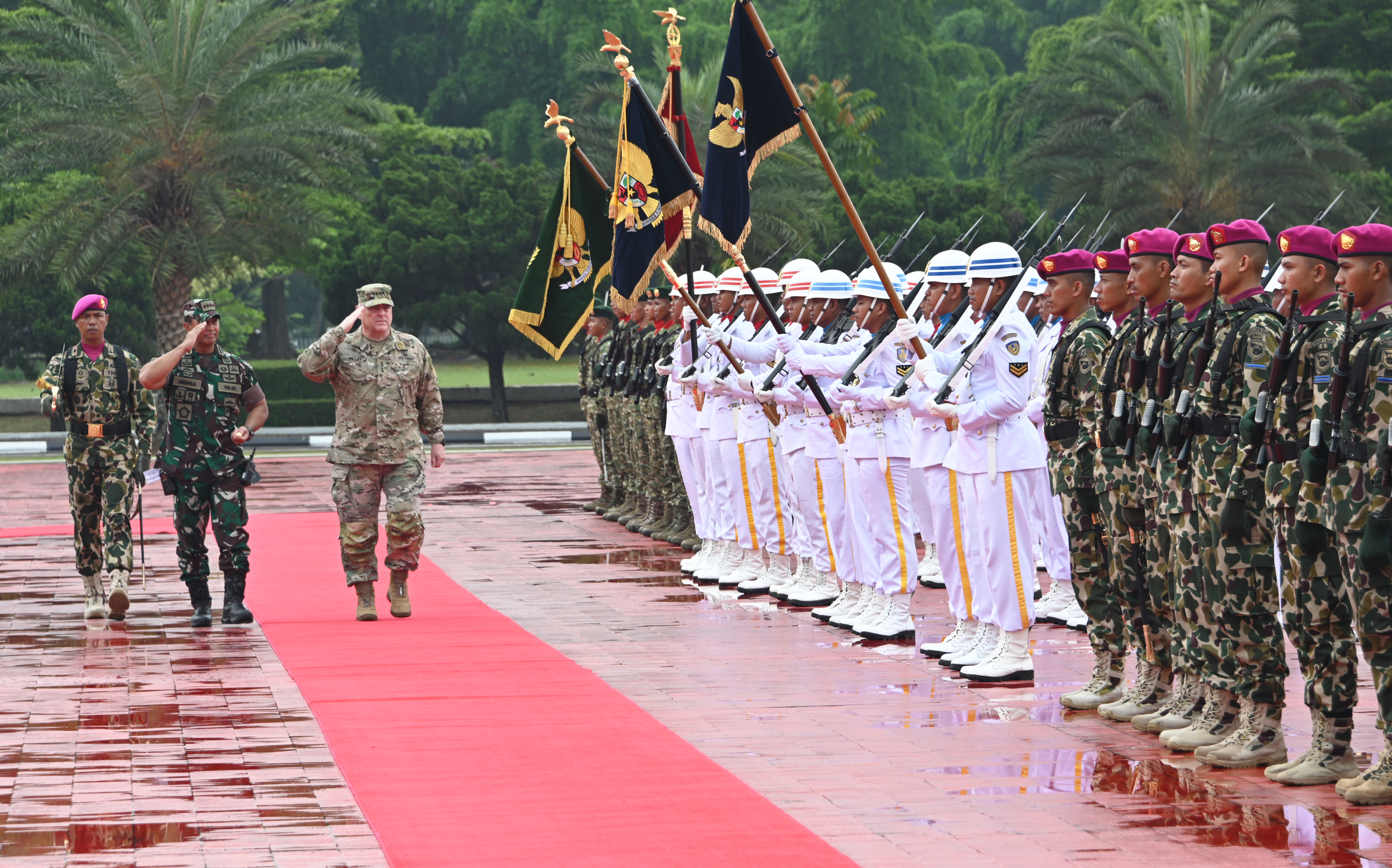
Reverse side. US Joint Chiefs of Staff General Milley to meet with General Andika at TNI Headquarters, Cilangkap, Jakarta, on July 25, 2022

=== Military forces flags ===
Flag	Date	Use	Description
	1945–present	Naval jack of the Indonesian Navy	Nine equal horizontal alternating stripes of red and white. This flag is also known as "Lencana Perang" or "War Flag" inspired by the flag of Majapahit kingdom.
	1999–present	Flag of the Indonesian National Armed Forces	Red, with the Indonesian National Armed Forces insignia and the motto "Tri Dharma Eka Karma". "Three Services, One Struggle" "Tiga Pengabdian, Satu Perjuangan"
	1999–present	Flag of the Indonesian National Armed Forces	The reverse side features the national coat of arms.
		Flag of the Indonesian Army	Green, with the Indonesian Army insignia and the motto "Kartika Eka Paksi" literally: Kartika = Bintang, Eka = Satu, Paksi = Burung. "The Mighty Bird Without Match Upholds High Ideals" "Burung Gagah Perkasa Tanpa Tanding Menjunjung Cita-cita Tinggi" Burung could also be translated into "Soldier" or "Prajurit".
		Flag of the Indonesian Army	The reverse side features the national coat of arms.
		Flag of the Indonesian Navy	Blue, with the Indonesian Navy insignia and the motto "Jalesveva Jayamahe". "It is in the Seas We are Victorious" "Justru di Lautan Kita Menang" also translated as "Our Glory Is in the Seas" or “Kejayaan Kita Ada di Laut".
		Flag of the Indonesian Navy	The reverse side features the national coat of arms.
		Flag of the Indonesian Air Force	Navy blue, with the Indonesian Air Force insignia and the motto "Swa Bhuwana Paksa". "Wings of the Motherland" "Sayap Tanah Air" Sayap could also be translated into "Protector" or "Pelindung".
		Flag of the Indonesian Air Force	The reverse side features the national coat of arms.
		Commissioning pennant of the Indonesian Navy	Called the War Pennant or Ular-Ular Perang, it has the same red and white colors as the Indonesian flag, and has the form of a long swallowtail flag. The pennant is flown in all Indonesian Navy ships and indicating that the ship is on active duty.
		Flag of the Indonesian Marine Corps	Red, with the Indonesian Marine Corps insignia and the motto "Jalesu Bhumyamca Jayamahe". "Victorious on the Land and Sea" "Di Darat dan di Laut Kita Jaya"
		Flag of the Indonesian Marine Corps	The reverse side features the insignia of the Indonesian Navy.
	2021–present	Flag of the Indonesian National Armed Forces Reserve Component	

=== Rank flags ===
Examples of TNI red rank flags usage

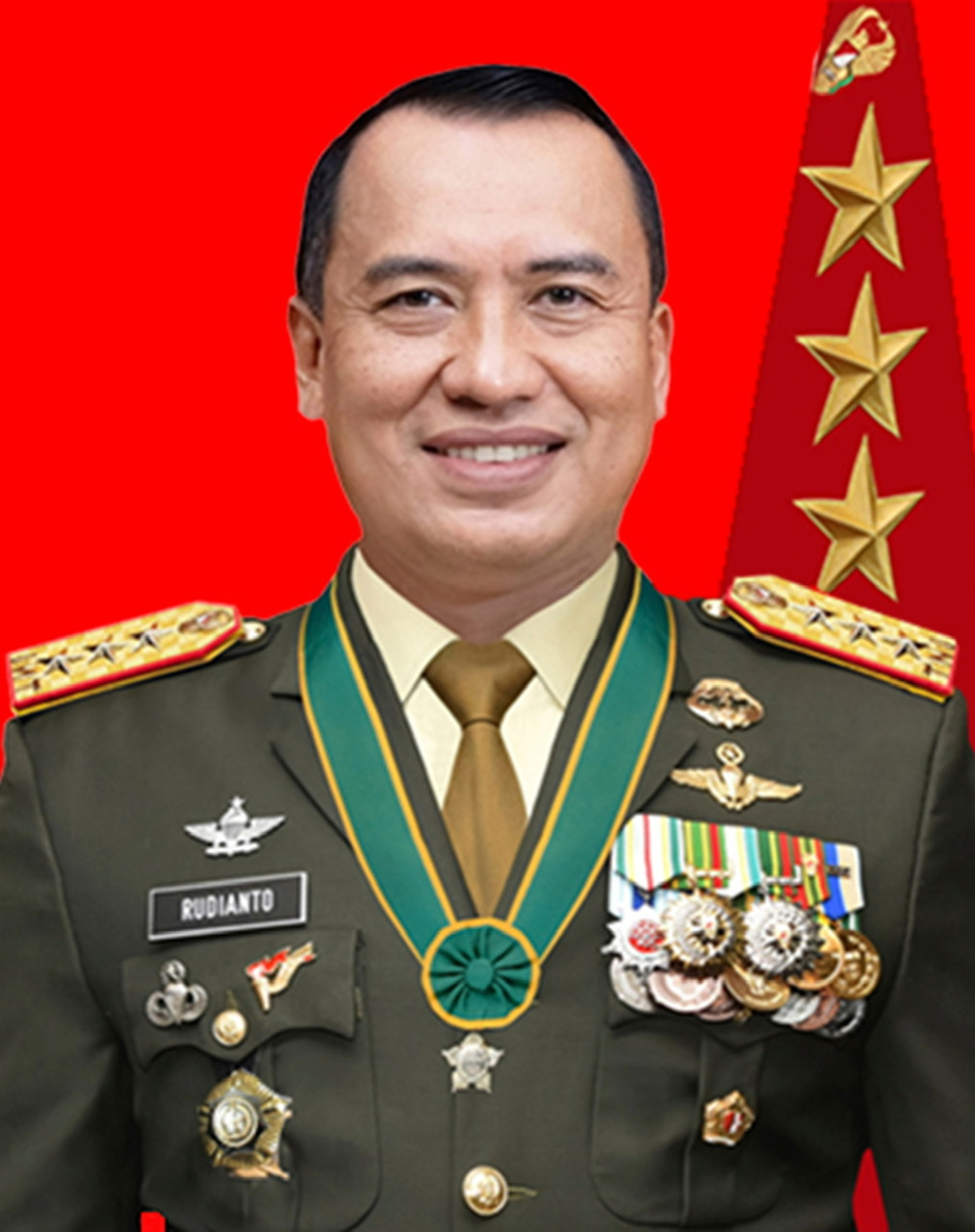
Lieutenant General Rudianto, Commanding General of the TNI Academy

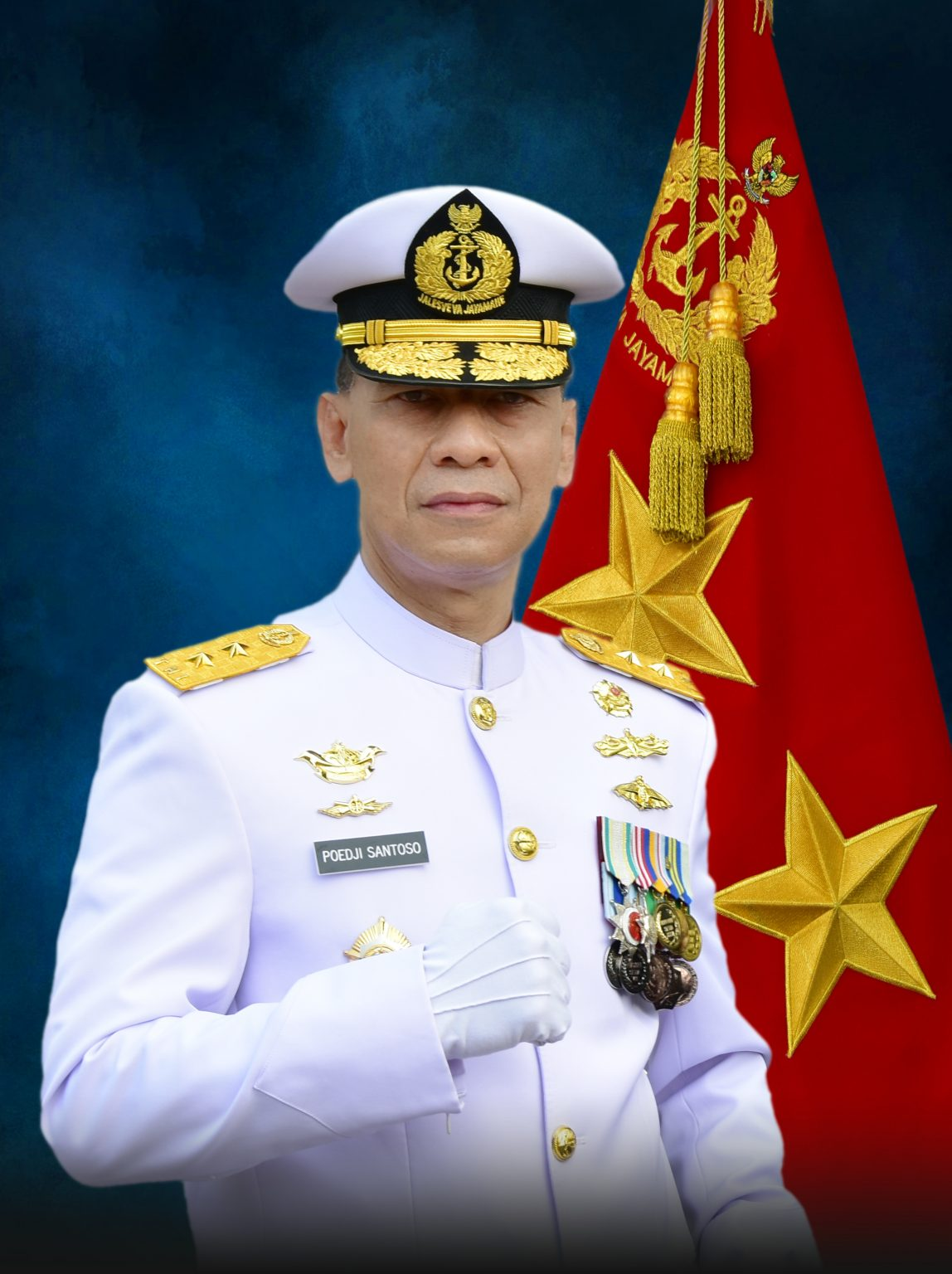
Rear Admiral Poedji Santoso, Head of the Armed Forces Finance Center

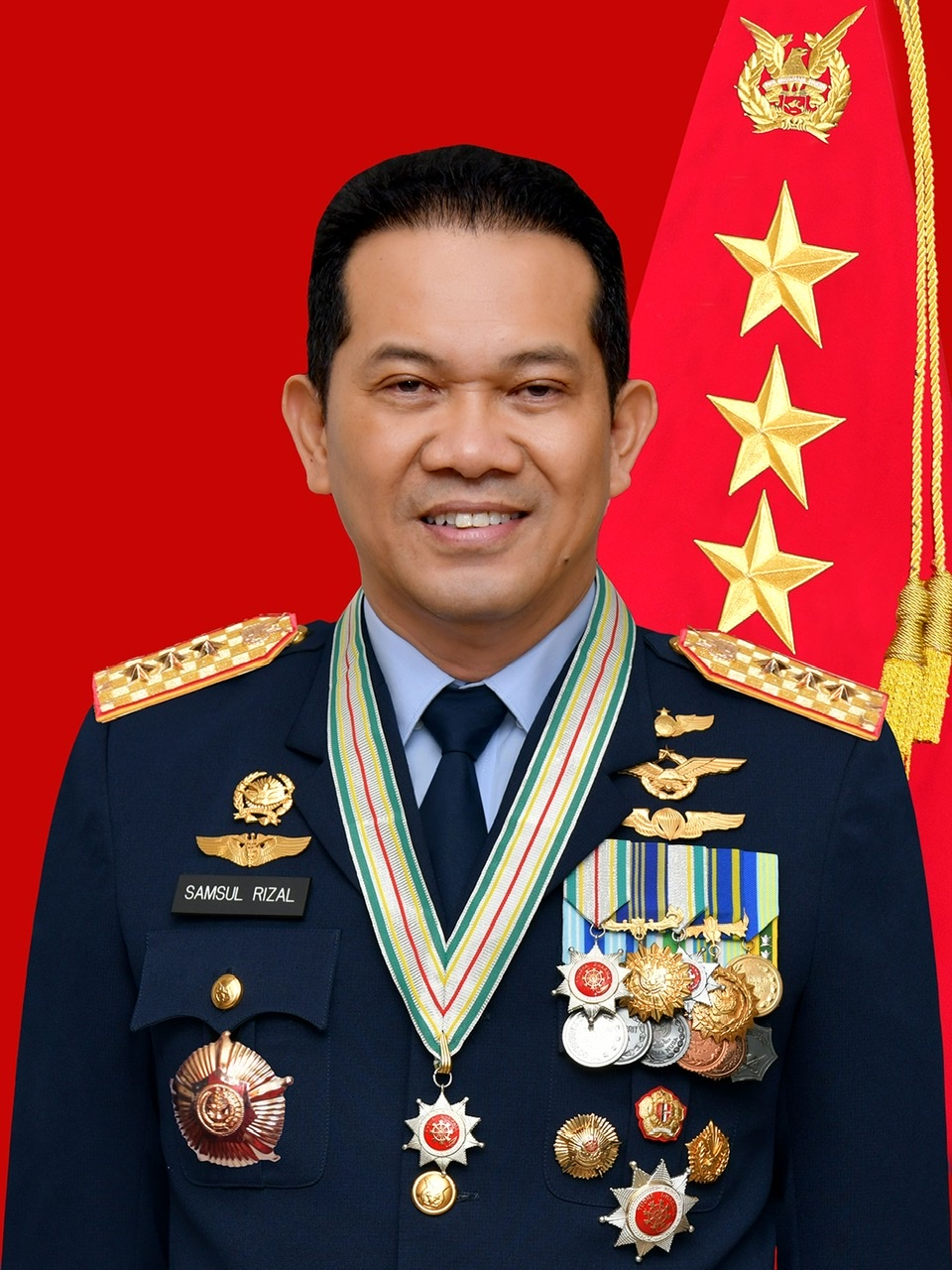
Air Marshal Samsul Rizal, Commander of the Armed Forces Command and Staff Colleges

The Service flag is used by those who held a position in their respective service branches. The TNI (red) variant of the flag is used by those who held a position in the TNI or Armed Forces itself; e.g. Lieutenant General Rudianto the commanding general of the TNI Academy (Danjen Akademi TNI), Rear Admiral Poedji Santoso who held the position as Head of the Armed Forces Finance Center (Kapusku TNI), and Air Marshal Samsul Rizal who held the position as Commander of the Armed Forces Command and Staff Colleges (Dansesko TNI) or Admiral Yudo Margono who held the position of Commander of the TNI.

Service flag	TNI flag	Date	Use	Description
		Before 2022, the Army used red as the service rank flag. Switched to green since 2022.	Flag of a general (jenderal) of the Indonesian Army. Usually held by the Chief of Staff of the Indonesian Army	
		Before 2022, the Army used red as the service rank flag. Switched to green since 2022.	Flag of a lieutenant general (letnan jenderal) of the Indonesian Army	
		Before 2022, the Army used red as the service rank flag. Switched to green since 2022.	Flag of a major general (mayor jenderal) of the Indonesian Army	
		Before 2022, the Army used red as the service rank flag. Switched to green since 2022.	Flag of a brigadier general (brigadir jenderal) of the Indonesian Army	
			Flag of an admiral (Laksamana) of the Indonesian Navy. Usually held by the Chief of Staff of the Indonesian Navy	
			Flag of a vice admiral (Laksamana madya) of the Indonesian Navy	
			Flag of a rear admiral (Laksamana muda) of the Indonesian Navy	
			Flag of a commodore (Laksamana pertama) of the Indonesian Navy	
			Flag of an air chief marshal (Marsekal) of the Indonesian Air Force. Usually held by the Chief of Staff of the Indonesian Air Force.	
			Flag of an air marshal (Marsekal madya) of the Indonesian Air Force	
			Flag of an air vice marshal (Marsekal muda) of the Indonesian Air Force	
			Flag of an air commodore (Marsekal pertama) of the Indonesian Air Force	

=== Former military and rank flags ===
Flag	Date	Use	Description
	until 1999	Flag of the Armed Forces of the Republic of Indonesia	Flag of the armed forces before its separation as TNI and POLRI in 1999.
	until 2022	Flag of a general (jenderal) of the Indonesian Army. Usually held by the Chief of Staff of the Indonesian Army (Kasad)	Red rank flags were given to all Army generals until 2022, when they were switched to green coloured flags. The red coloured flags remain in use for Army generals who hold the position in the Armed Forces instead of specifically the Army service branch.
	until 2022	Flag of a lieutenant general (letnan jenderal) of the Indonesian Army	Red rank flags were given to all Army generals until 2022, when they were switched to green coloured flags. The red coloured flags remain in use for Army generals who hold the position in the Armed Forces instead of specifically the Army service branch.
	until 2022	Flag of a major general (mayor jenderal) of the Indonesian Army	Red rank flags were given to all Army generals until 2022, when they were switched to green coloured flags. The red coloured flags remain in use for Army generals who hold the position in the Armed Forces instead of specifically the Army service branch.
	until 2022	Flag of a brigadier general (brigadir jenderal) of the Indonesian Army	Red rank flags were given to all Army generals until 2022, when they were switched to green coloured flags. The red coloured flags remain in use for Army generals who hold the position in the Armed Forces instead of specifically the Army service branch.

== Law enforcement ==
=== Law enforcement forces flag ===
Flag	Date	Use	Description
		Flag of the Indonesian National Police	Black, with the Indonesian National Police insignia and the motto "Rastra Sewakottama". "Main Servant of the Homeland and Nation" "Abdi Utama dari pada Nusa dan Bangsa"
		Flag of the Indonesian National Police	The reverse side features the national coat of arms.
		Naval jack or ensign of the Indonesian Maritime Security Agency	
		Flag of the Indonesian Maritime Security Agency	Blue, with the seal of the Indonesian Maritime Security Agency.

=== Rank flags ===
Flag	Date	Use	Description
		Flag of a police general (jenderal polisi) of the Indonesian National Police. Usually held by the Chief of the Indonesian National Police (Kapolri)	
		Flag of a police commissioner general (komisaris jenderal polisi) of the Indonesian National Police	
		Flag of a police inspector general (inspektur jenderal polisi) of the Indonesian National Police	
		Flag of a police brigadier general (brigadir jenderal polisi) of the Indonesian National Police	
		Flag of a vice admiral (Laksamana madya) of the Indonesian Maritime Security Agency (BAKAMLA)	
		Flag of a rear admiral (Laksamana muda) of the Indonesian Maritime Security Agency (BAKAMLA)	
		Flag of a commodore (Laksamana pertama) of the Indonesian Maritime Security Agency (BAKAMLA)	

== Provincial flags ==
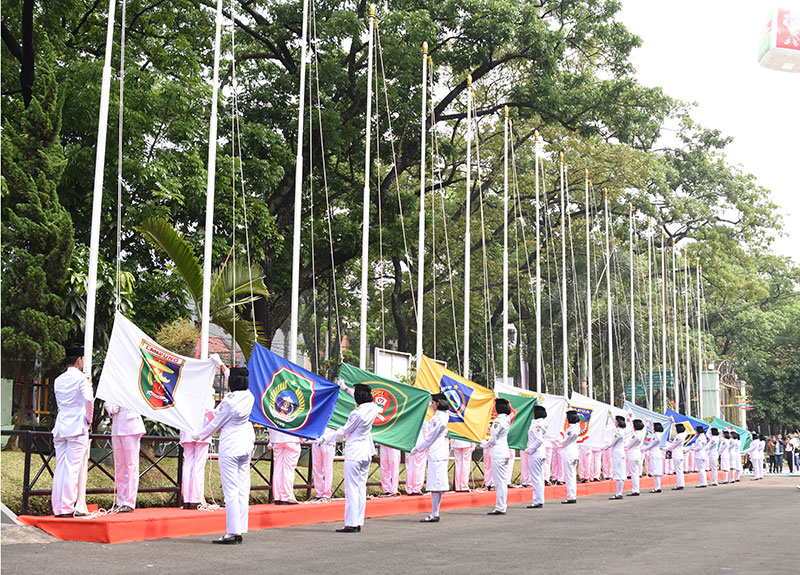
The provincial flags were raised at the opening of the National Paralympic Week event 2016 (XV) in Siliwangi Stadium, Bandung.

Almost all provincial flags simply consist of a background charged with the respective emblems. The flag of North Sulawesi is an exception to this rule, it also has an inscription "SULAWESI UTARA" above the emblem.

Aceh

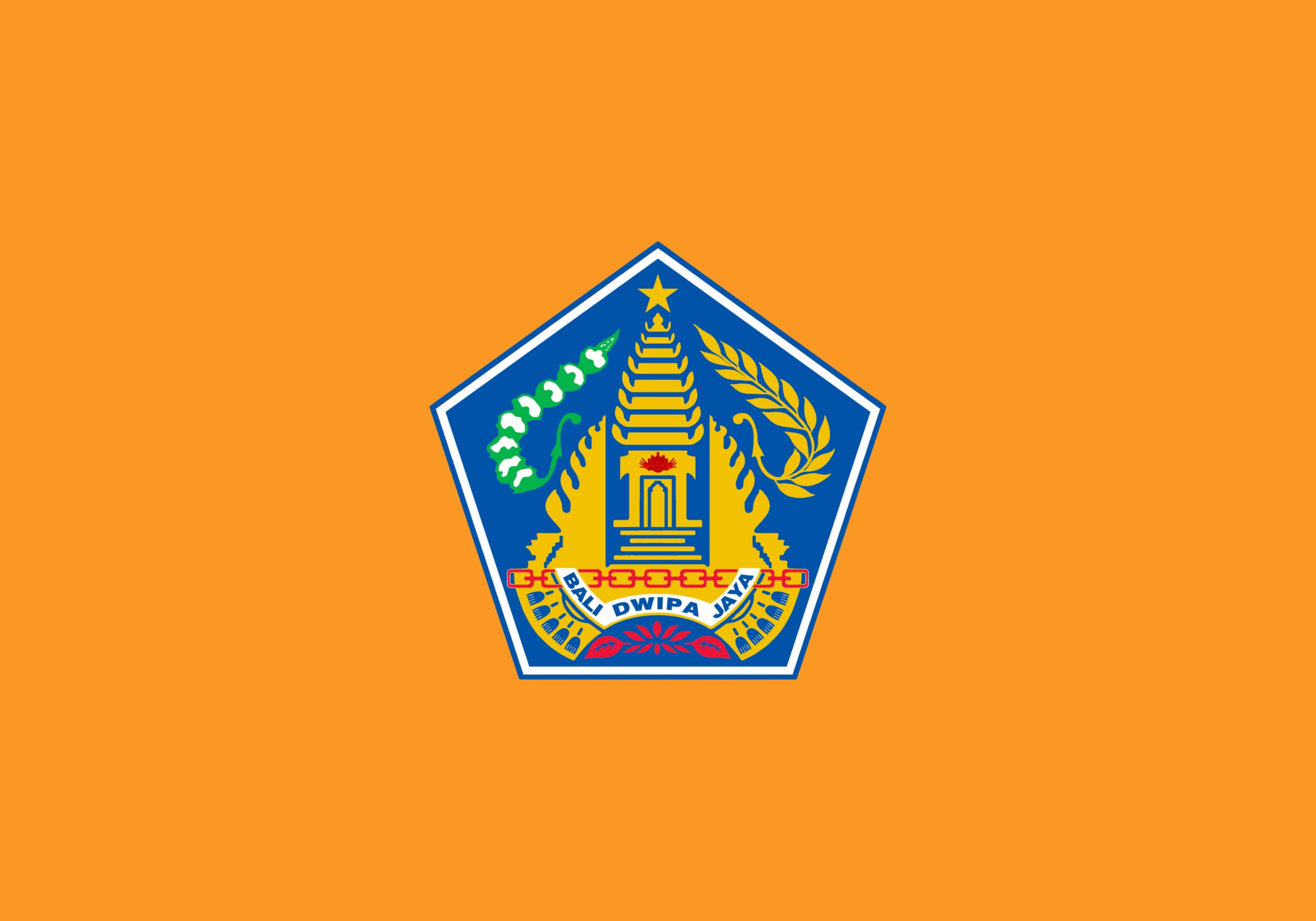
Bali

Bangka Belitung

Banten

Bengkulu

Gorontalo

Jakarta

Jambi

Central Java

East Java

West Java

Central Kalimantan

East Kalimantan

North Kalimantan

South Kalimantan

West Kalimantan

Lampung

Maluku

North Maluku

East Nusa Tenggara

West Nusa Tenggara

Papua

Central Papua

Highland Papua

South Papua

Southwest Papua

West Papua

Riau

Riau Islands

Central Sulawesi

North Sulawesi

South Sulawesi

Southeast Sulawesi

West Sulawesi

North Sumatra

South Sumatra

West Sumatra

Yogyakarta

== Historical flags ==
=== Former Governmental flags ===
Flag of the Ministry of Defence, used from 2005(?) until January 2022

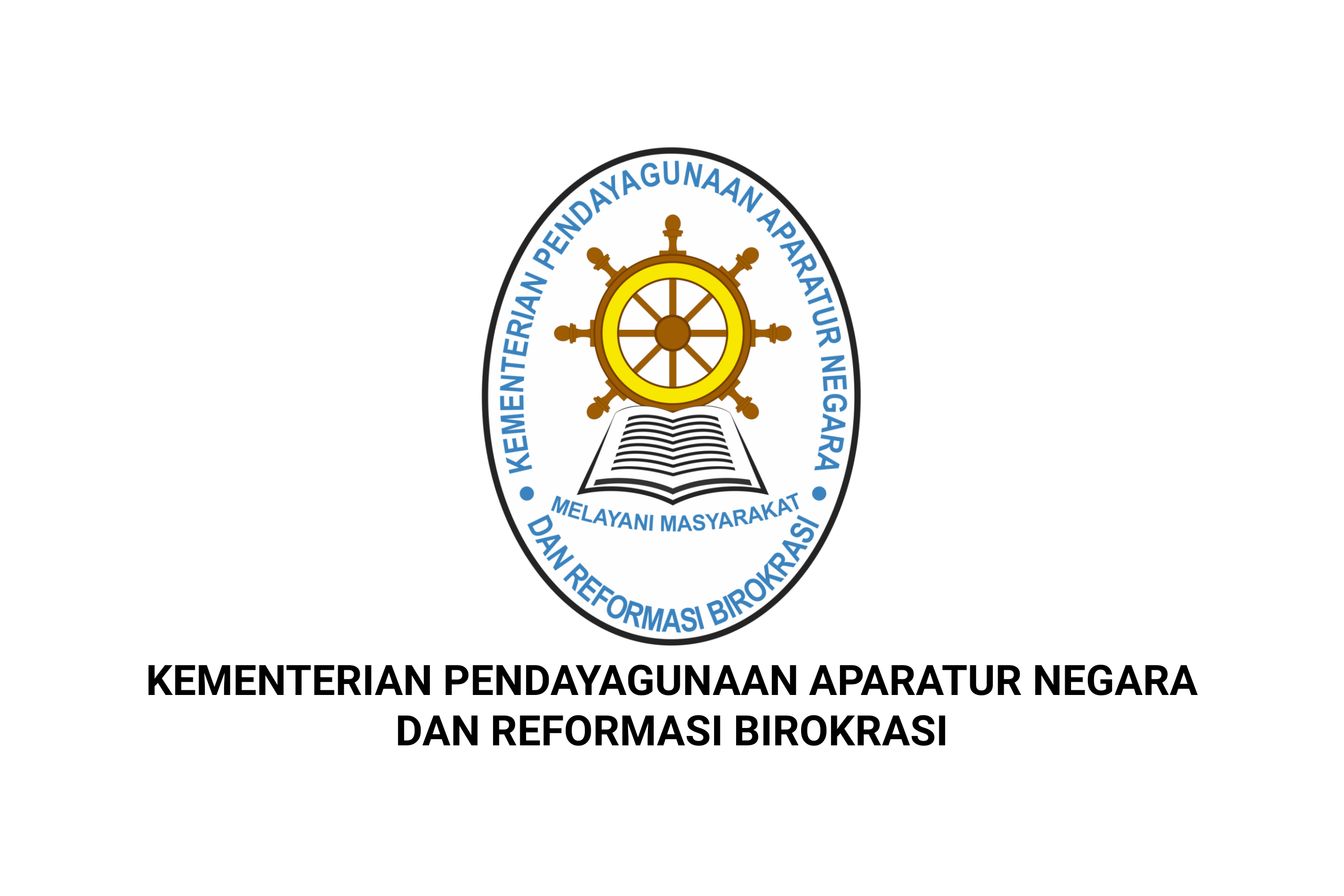
Flag of the Ministry of State Apparatus Utilization and Bureaucratic Reform, used from 2011(?) until 2021

Ministry of Villages, Development of Disadvantaged Regions, and Transmigration, used from 2015 until 2024

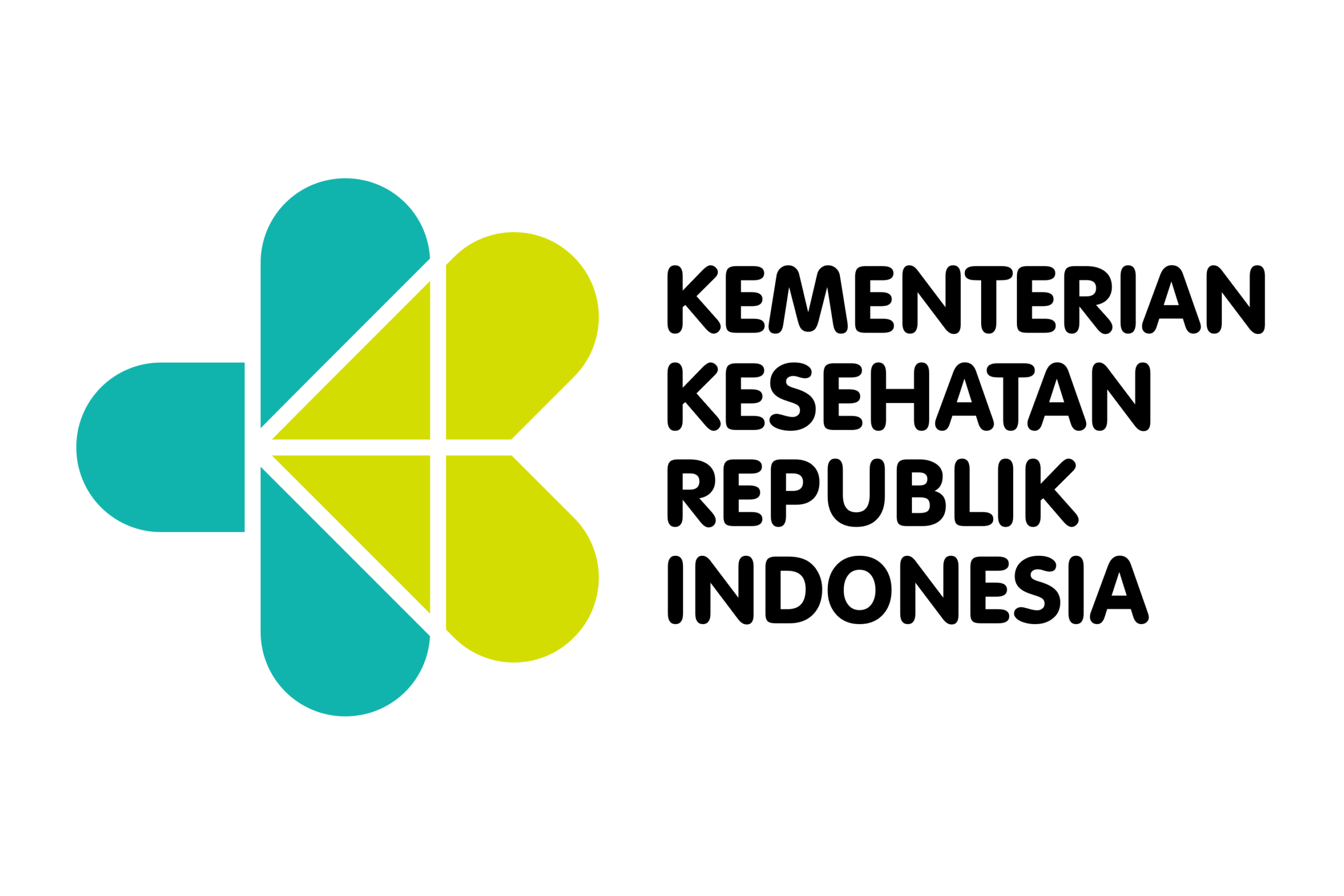
Ministry of Health, used from 2016 until 2024

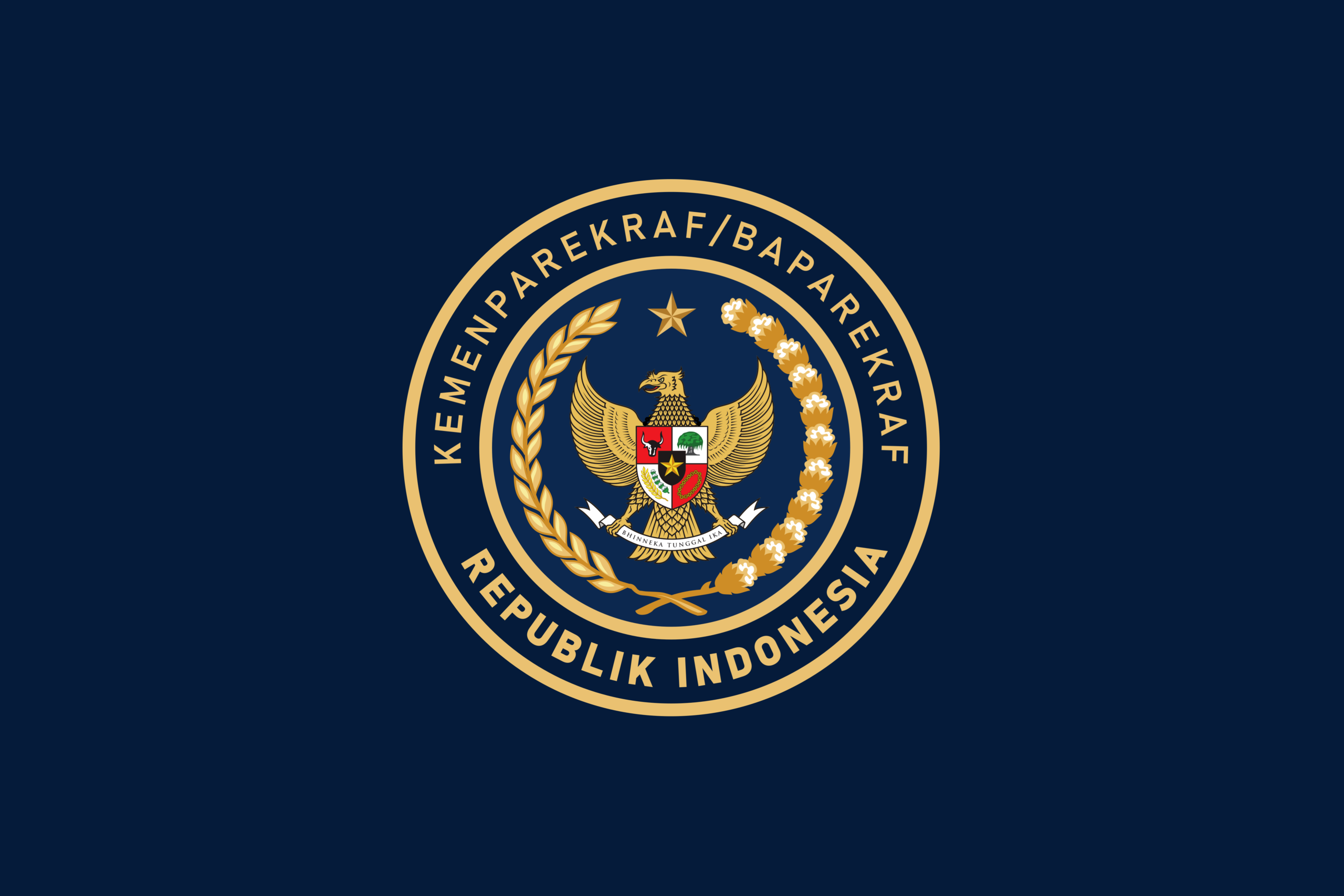
Ministry of Tourism and Creative Economy, used from 2020 until 2024

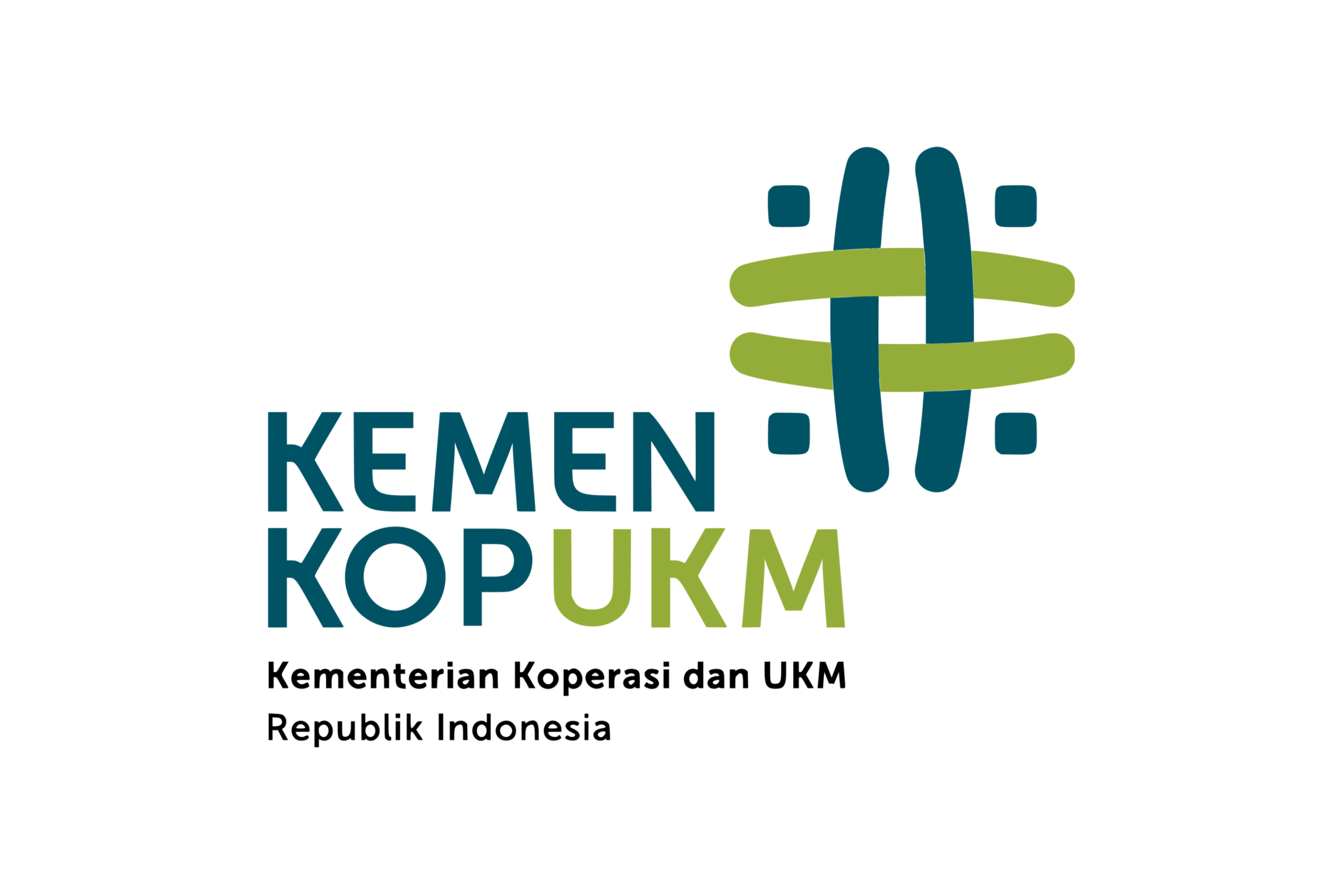
Ministry of Cooperatives and Small & Medium Enterprises, used from 2021 until 2024

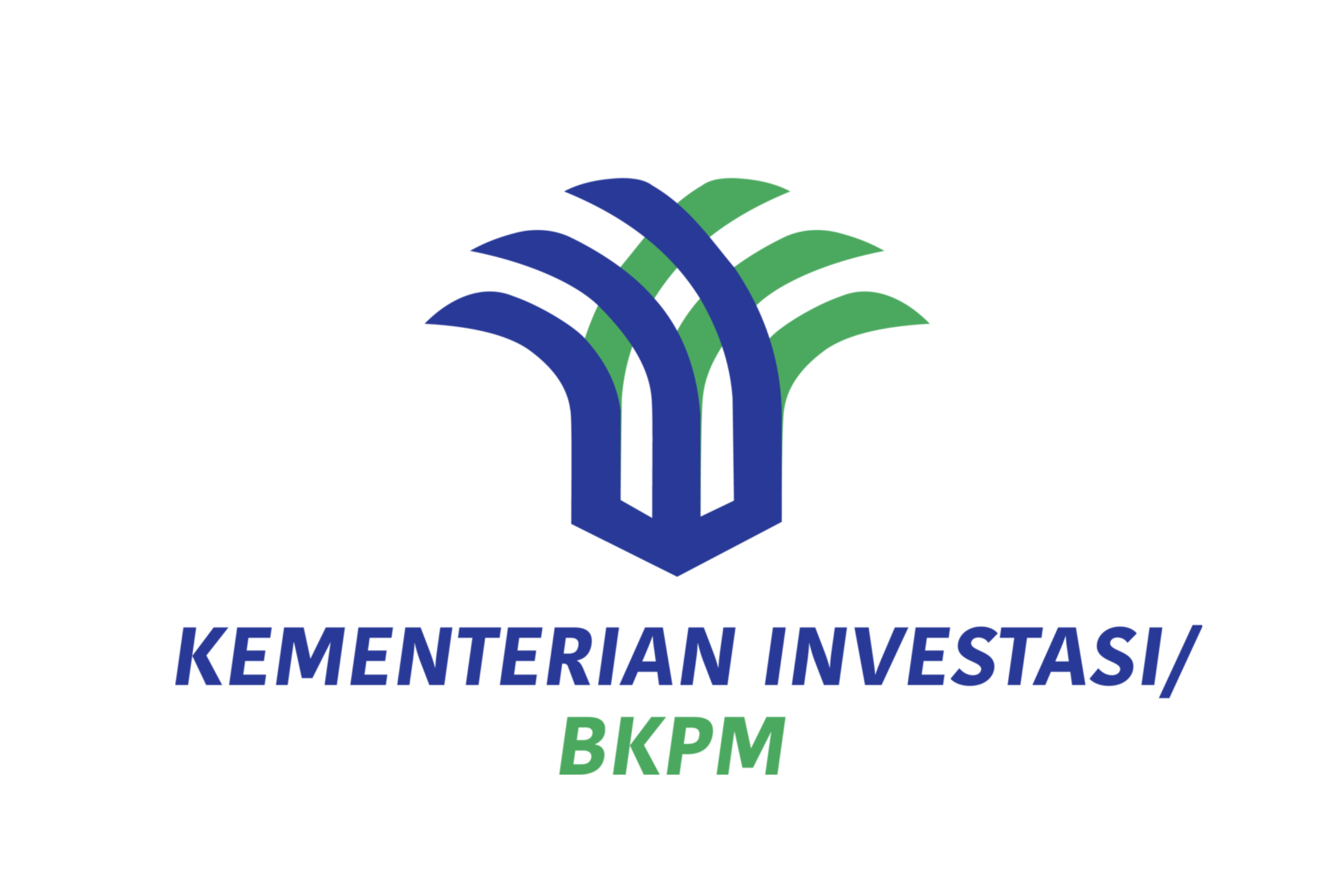
Ministry of Investment, used from 2021 until 2024

=== Flags of the United States of Indonesia ===
==== States and autonomous areas ====
State of the Republic of Indonesia (1949–1950)

Banjar (1948–1950)

East Indonesia (1946–1950)

East Java (1948–1950)

East Sumatra (1947–1950)

Great Dayak (1946–1950)

Madura (1948–1950)

Pasundan State (1947)

State of Pasundan (1948–1950)

South Sumatra (1948–1950)

Kotawaringin (1949–1950)

==== Government of East Indonesia ====
Presidential standard of the president of the State of East Indonesia

Pennant of the President of East Indonesia

Flag of the Prime Minister of East Indonesia

Flag of the Minister of East Indonesia

Flag of the Deputy Minister of East Indonesia

Flag of the Speaker of the Provisional Representative Body of East Indonesia

==== Government of South Sumatra ====
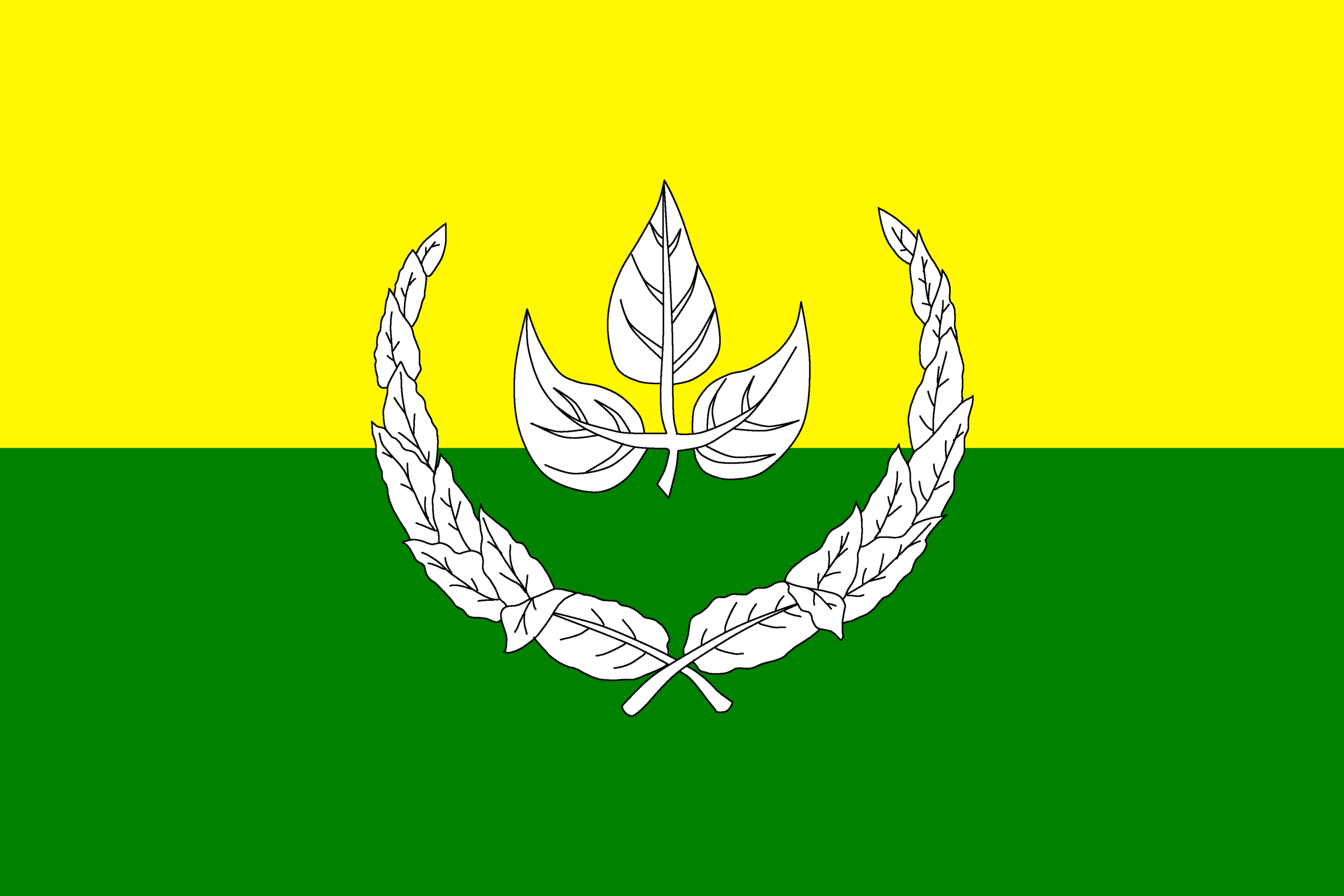
Flag of the Wali Negara of East Sumatra

=== Former province ===
Flag of East Timor during Indonesian occupation

=== Pre-colonial states and kingdoms ===
==== Borneo ====
Banjar

Brunei

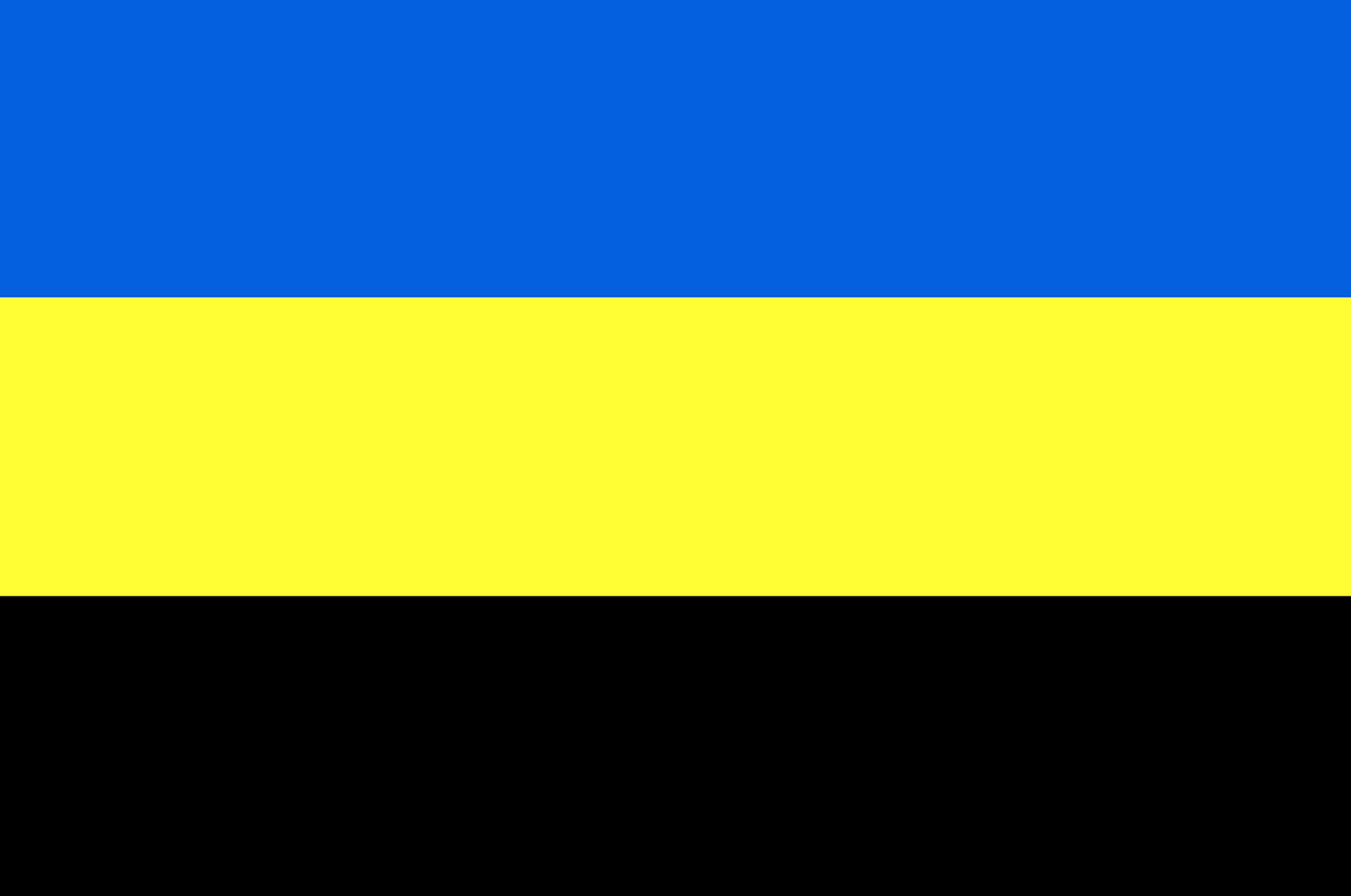
Bulungan

Gunung Tabur

Kotawaringin (old)

Kotawaringin (new)

Kubu

Landak

Lanfang

Matan

Mempawah

Pontianak

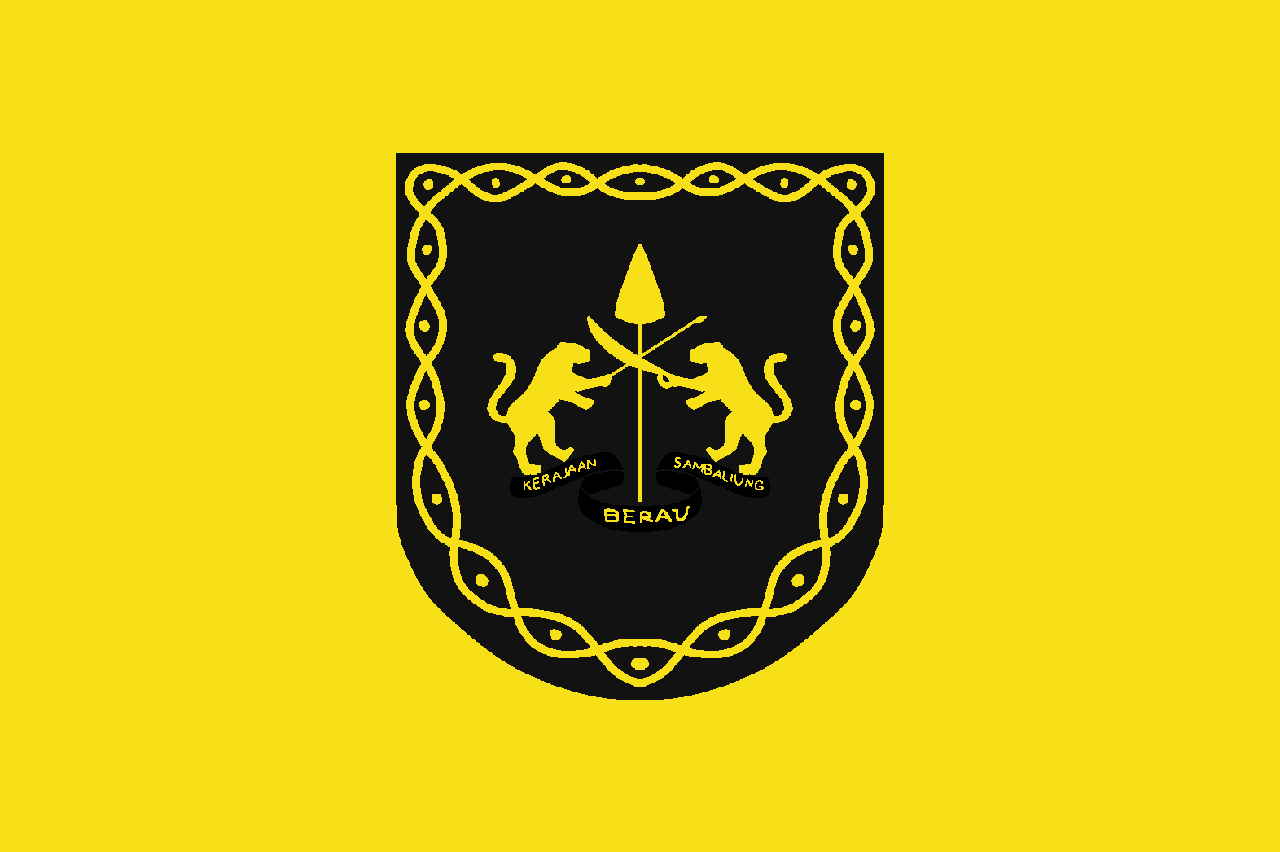
Sambaliung

Sambas

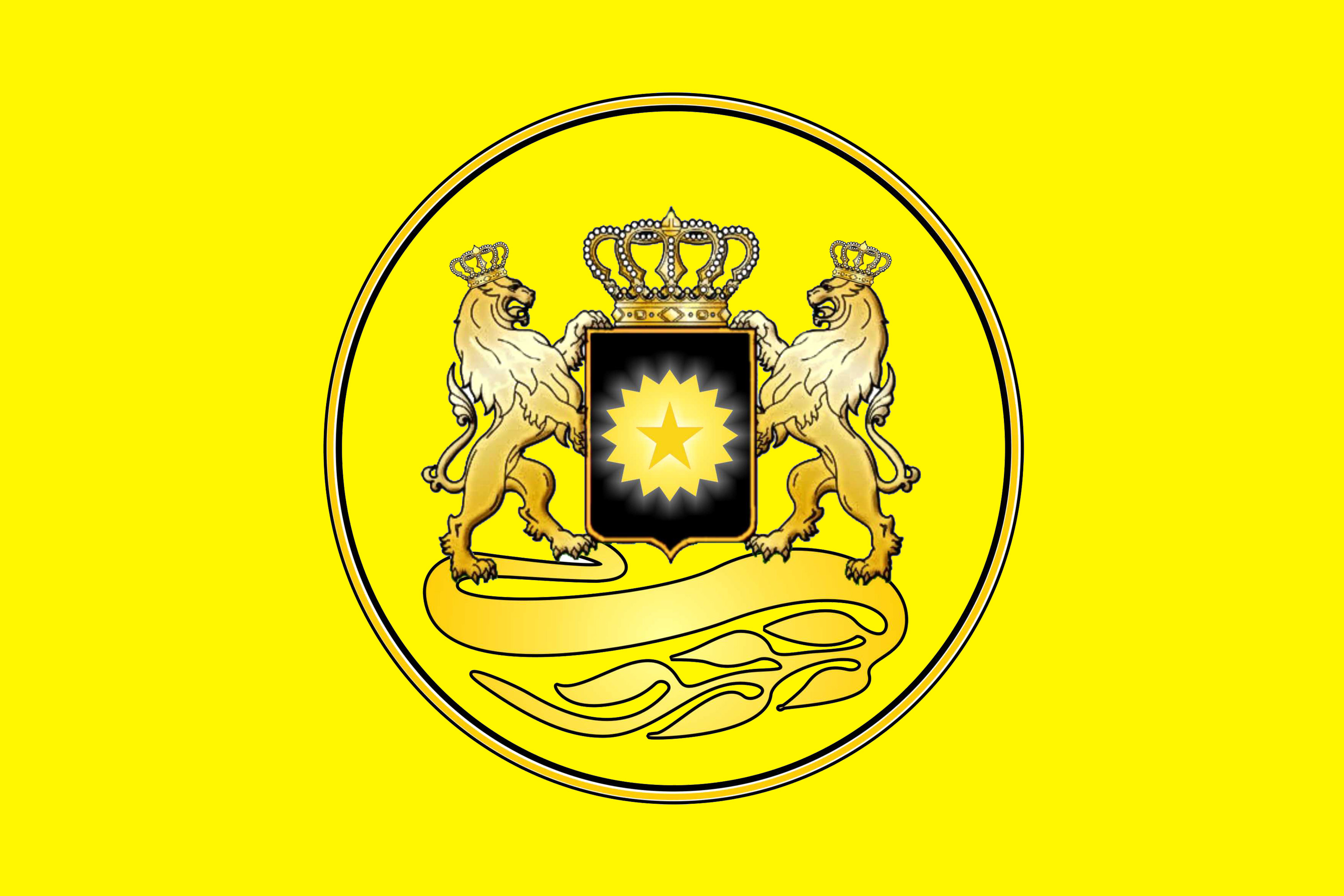
Sanggau

Simpang

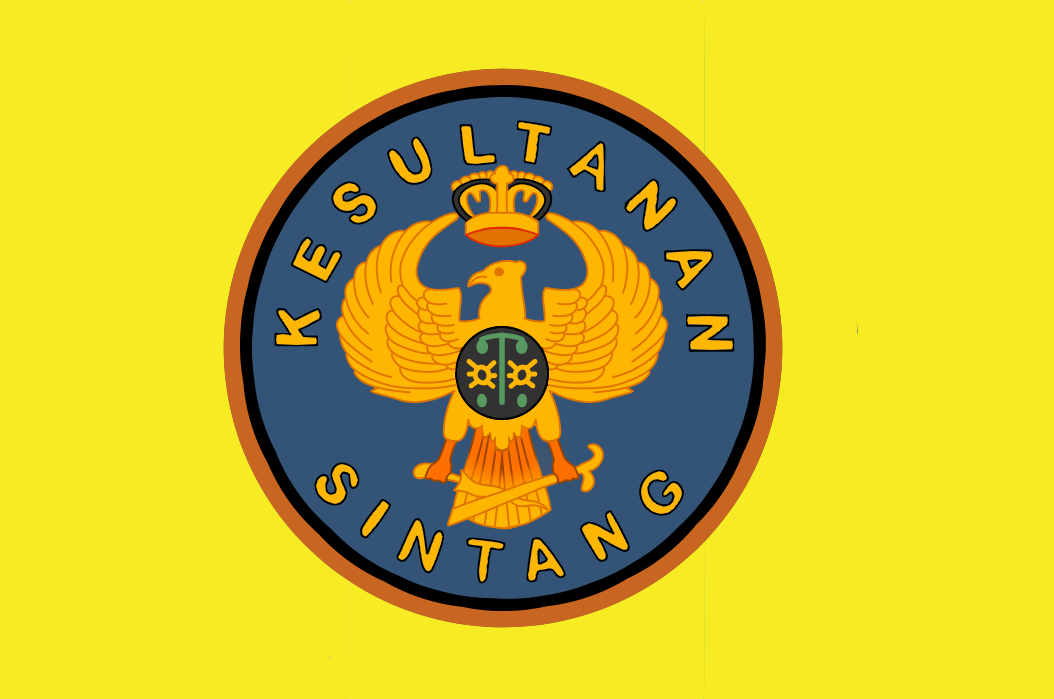
Sintang

Sulu

Tayan

==== Java and Madura ====
Banten

Cirebon

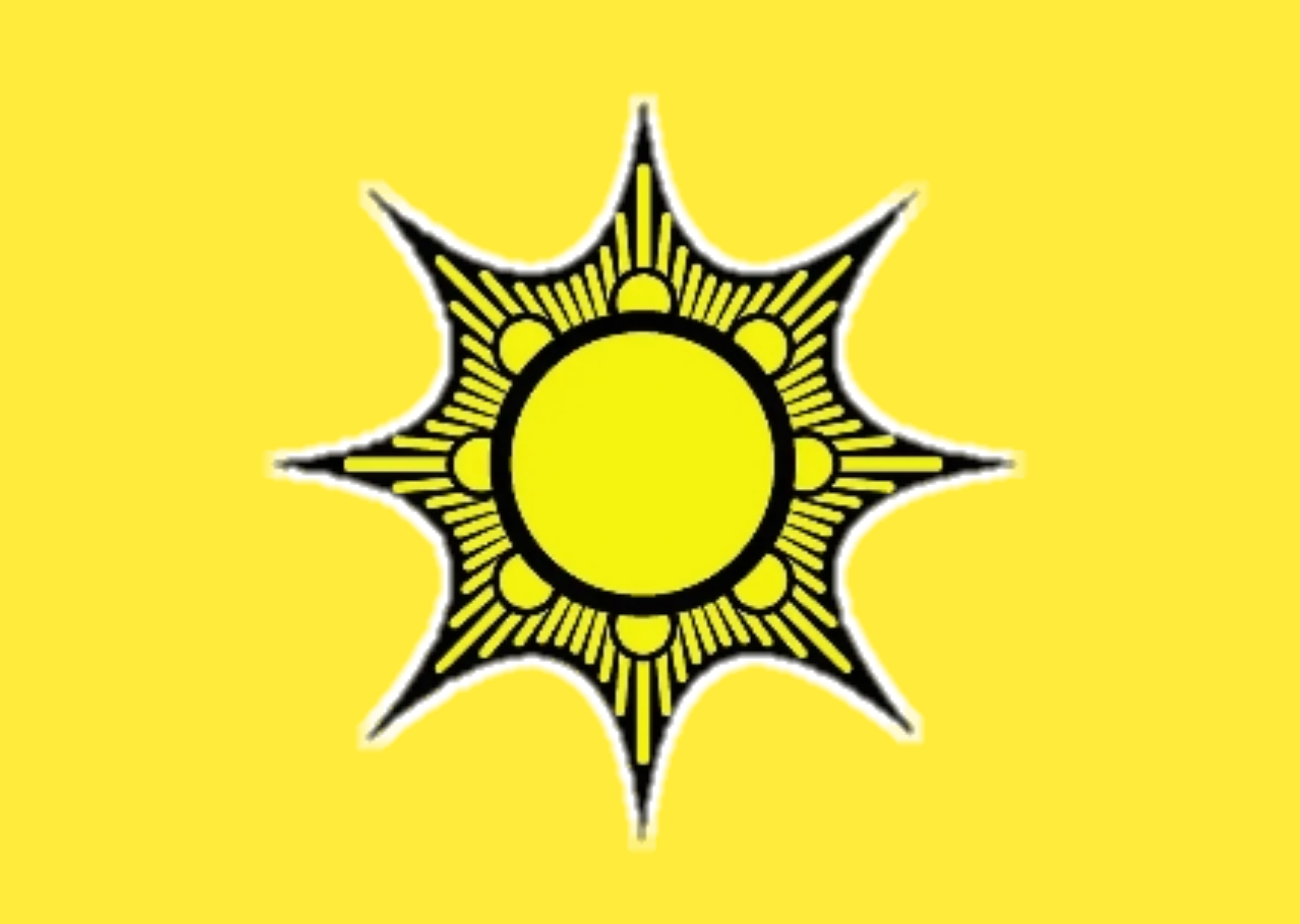
Demak

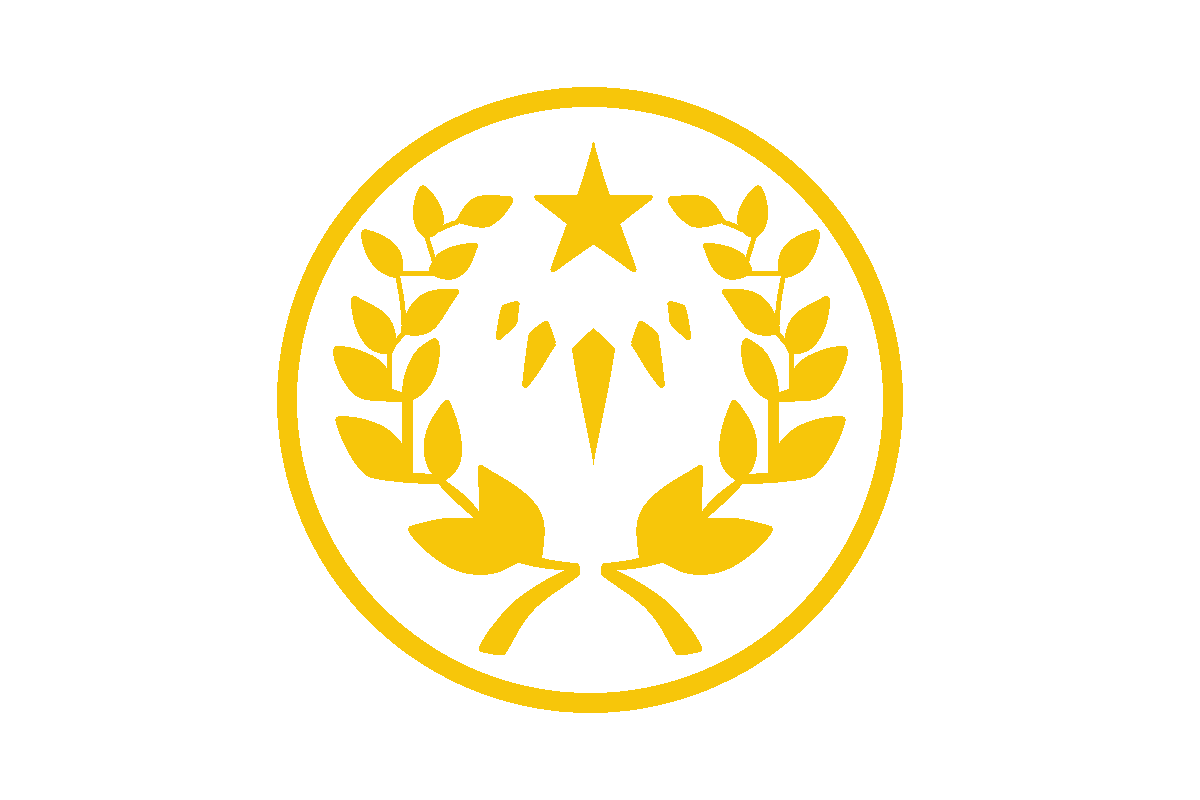
Kanoman

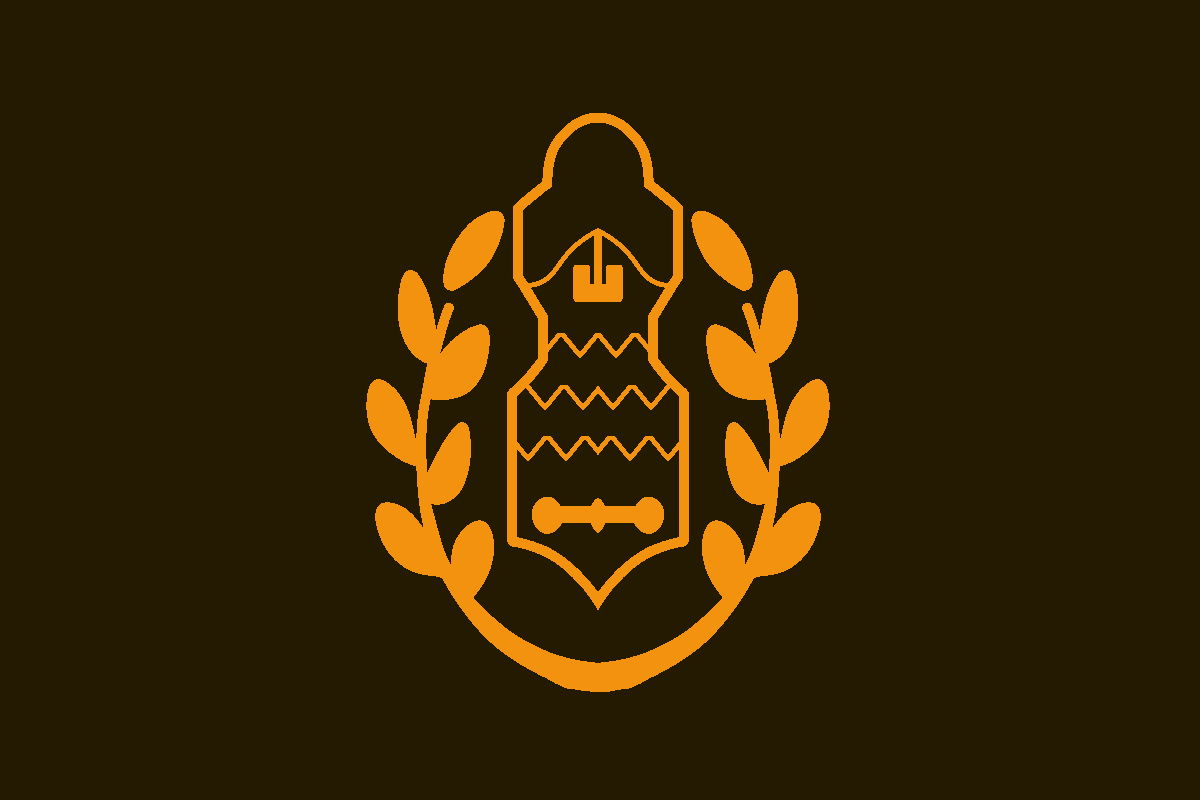
Kasepuhan

Majapahit

Mataram

Mangkunegaran

Pakualaman

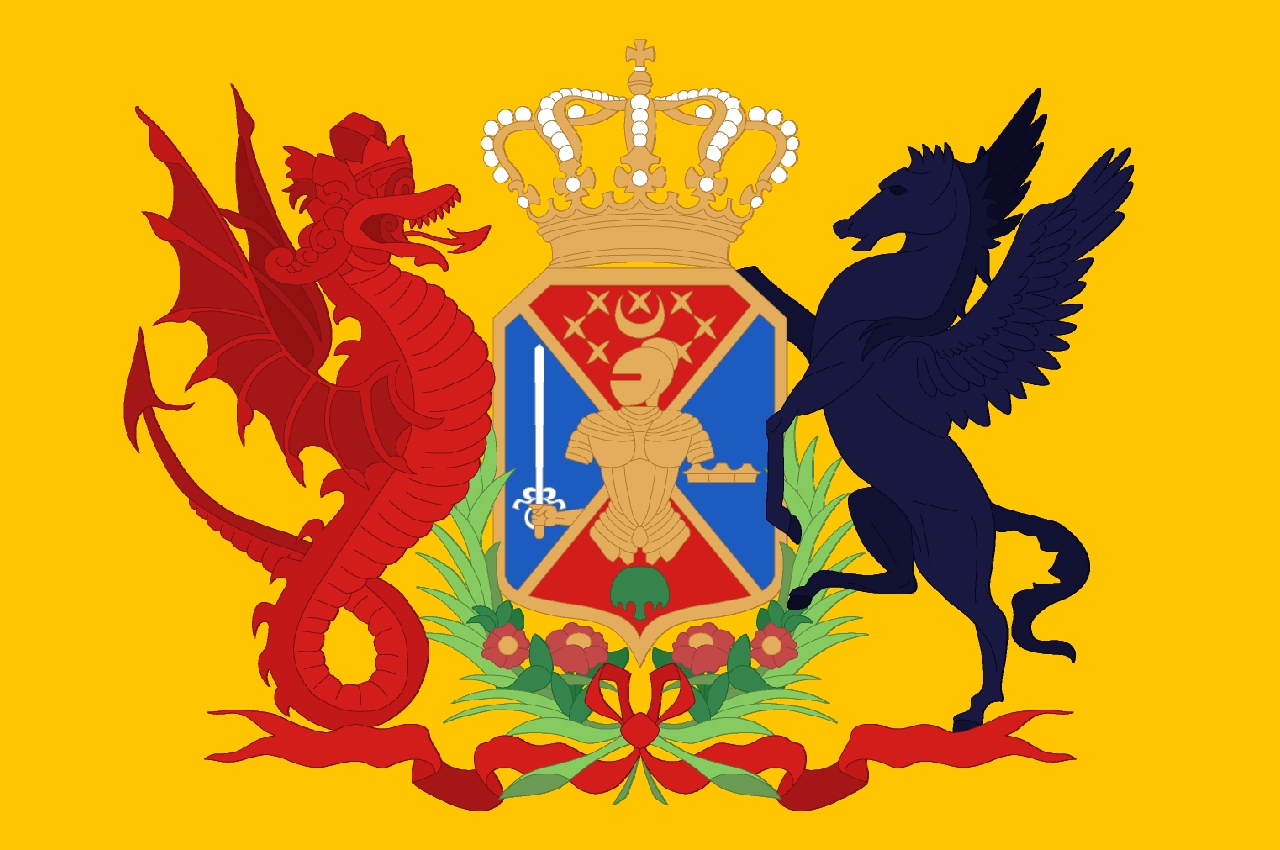
Sumenep

Surakarta

Yogyakarta

==== Sulawesi ====
Banggai

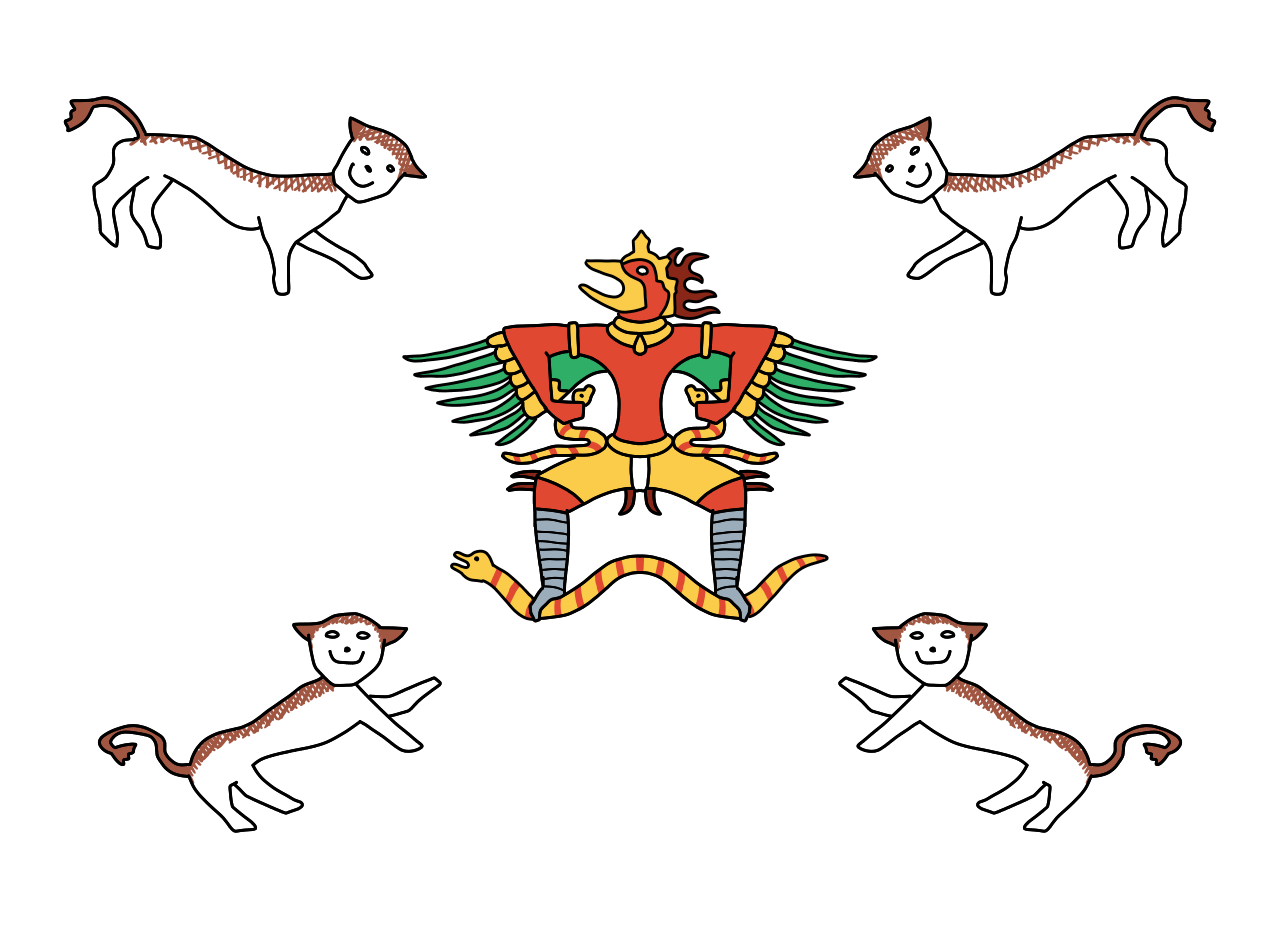
Bone

Buton

Gowa

Konawe

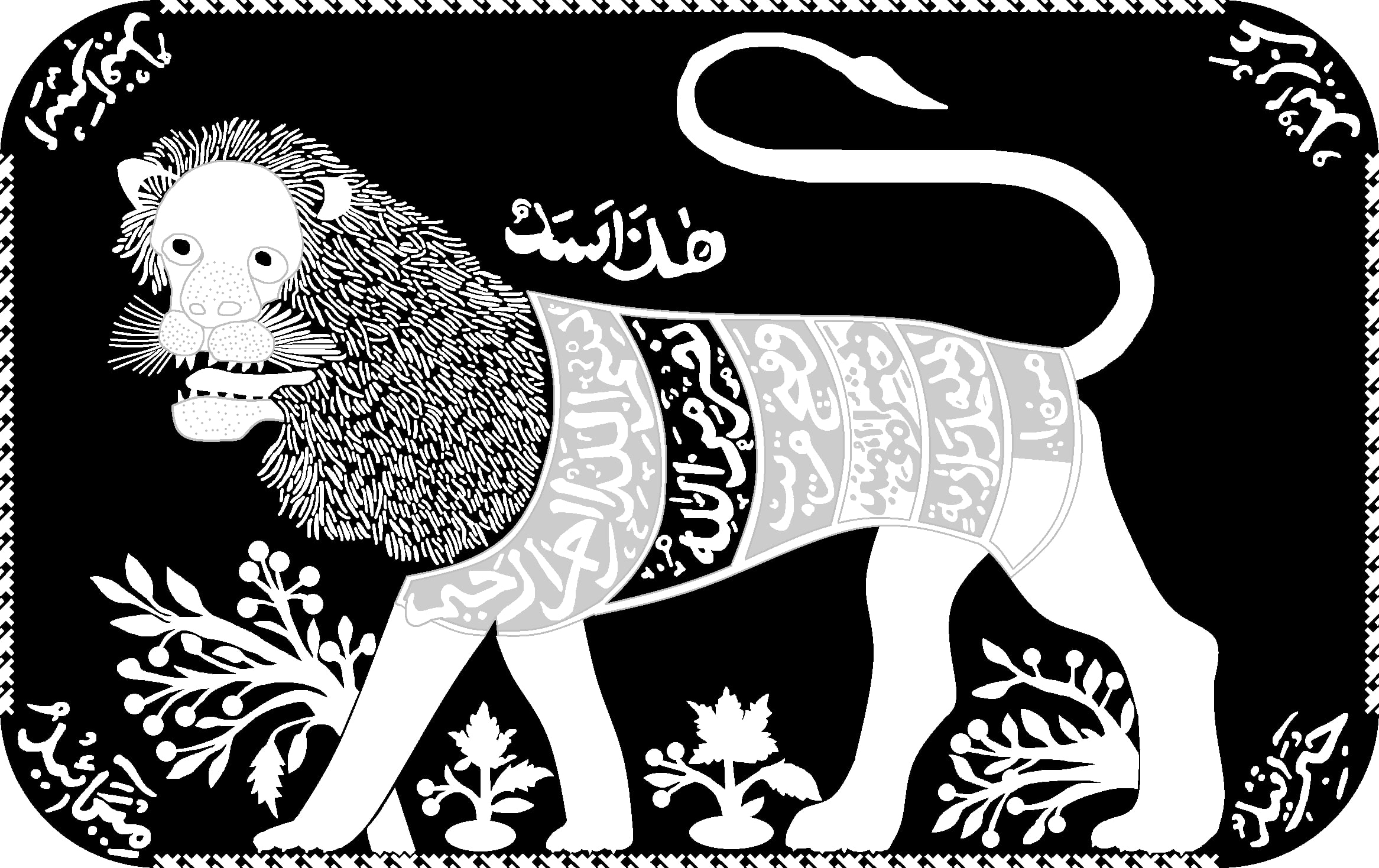
Macangnge flag of Luwu (17th century)

Mekongga

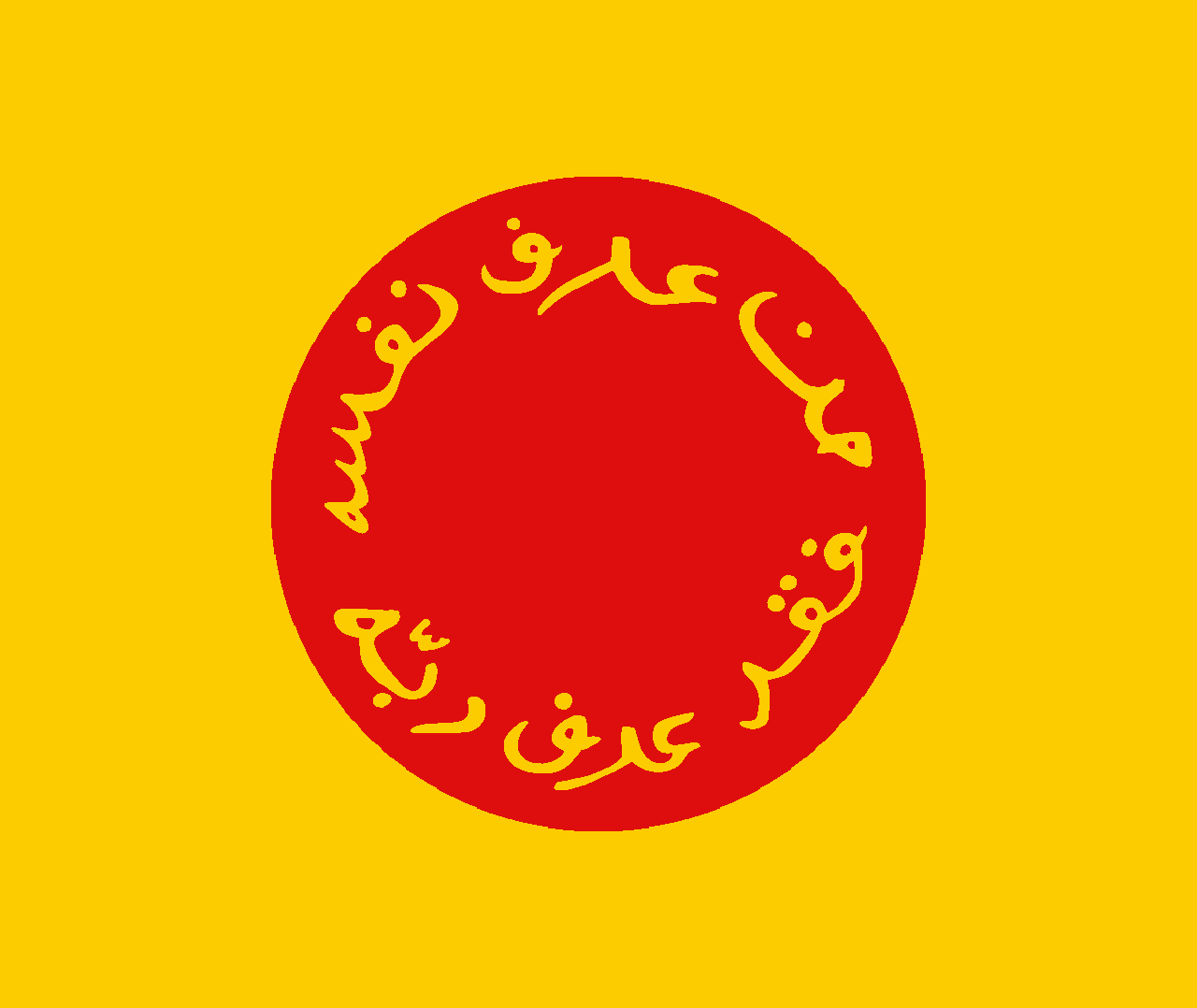
Muna

Sawitto

Sidenreng

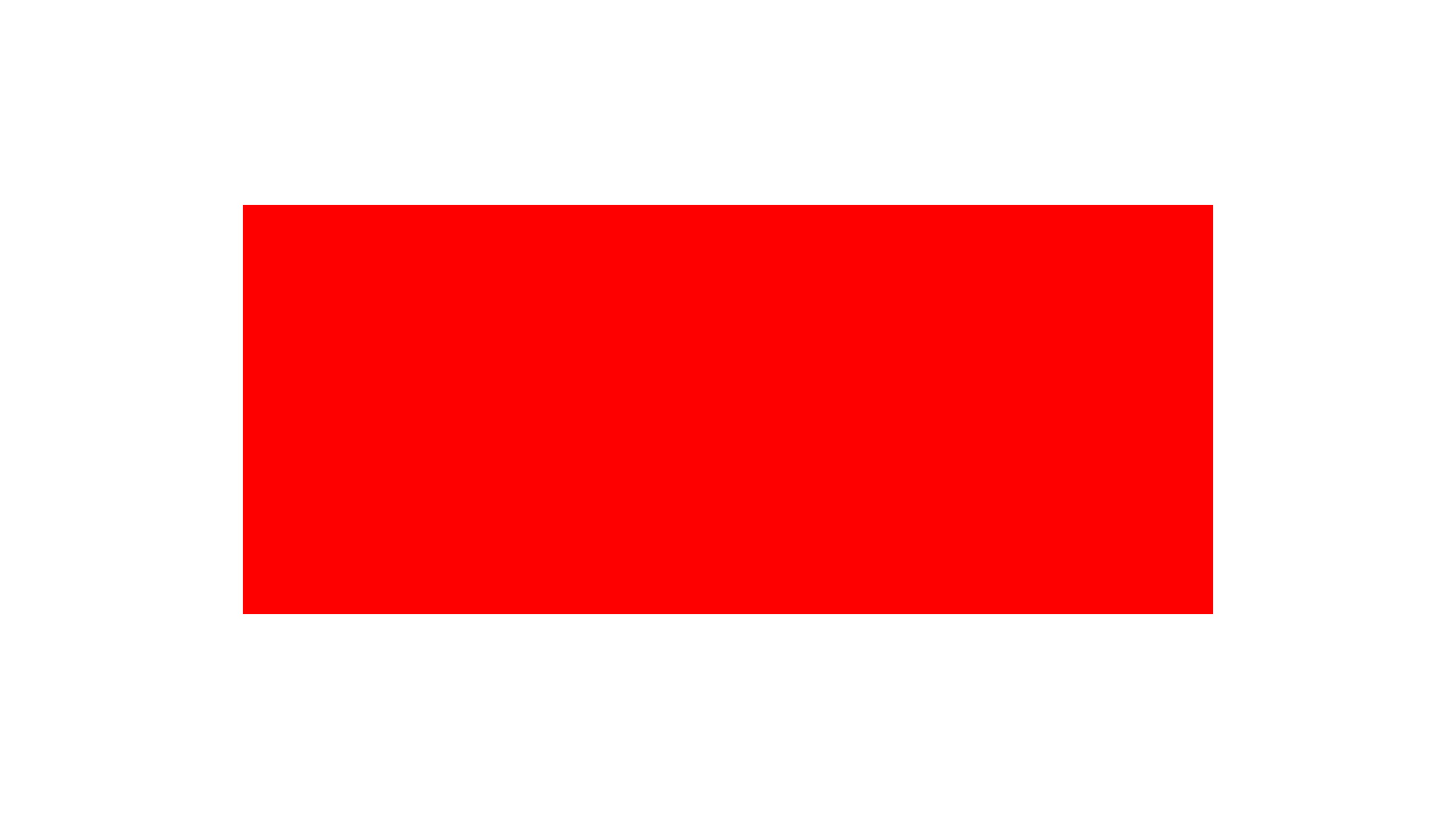
Siau

Soppeng

==== Sumatra ====
Aceh

Asahan

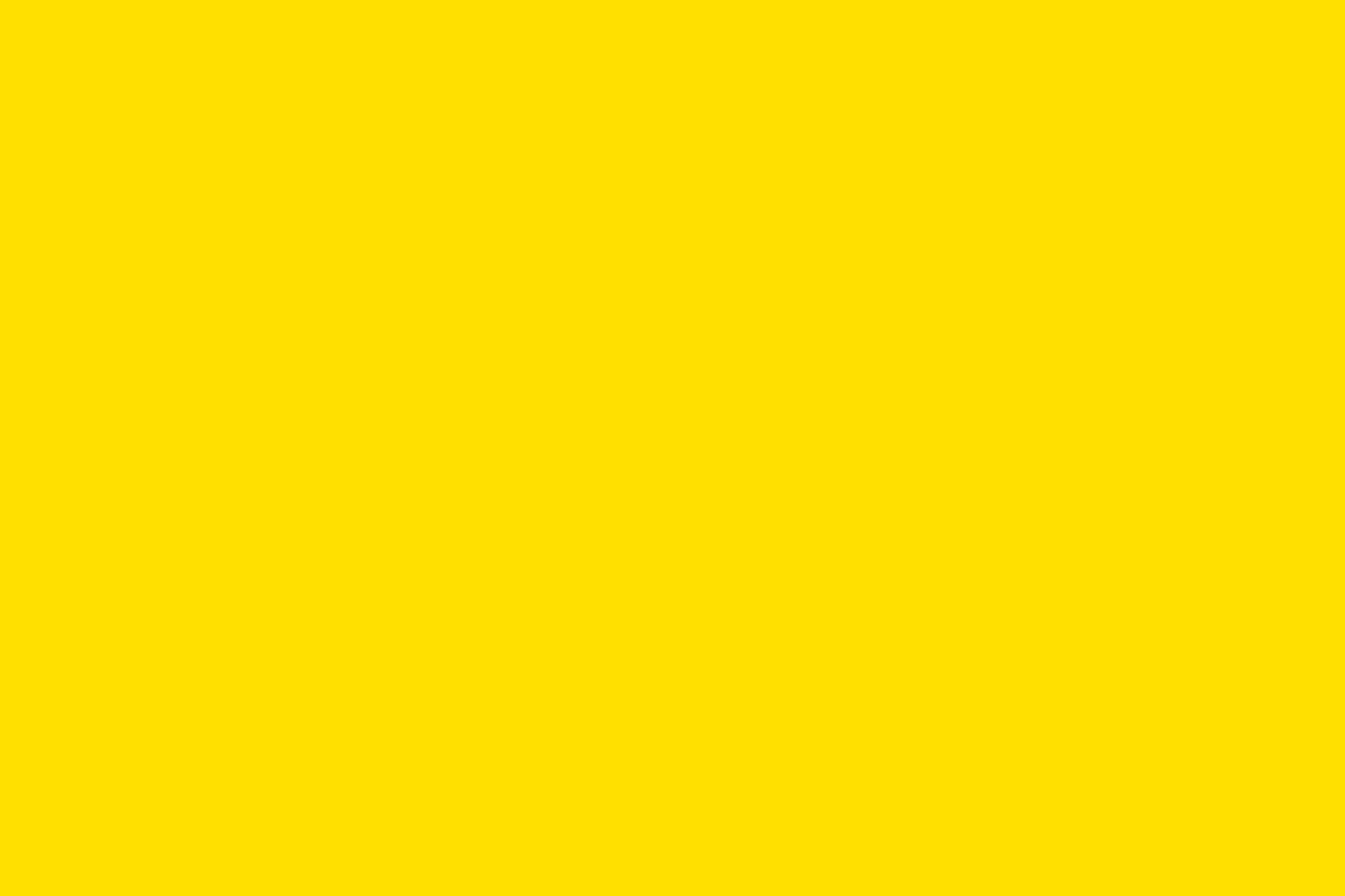
Bilah

Deli

Inderapura

Indragiri

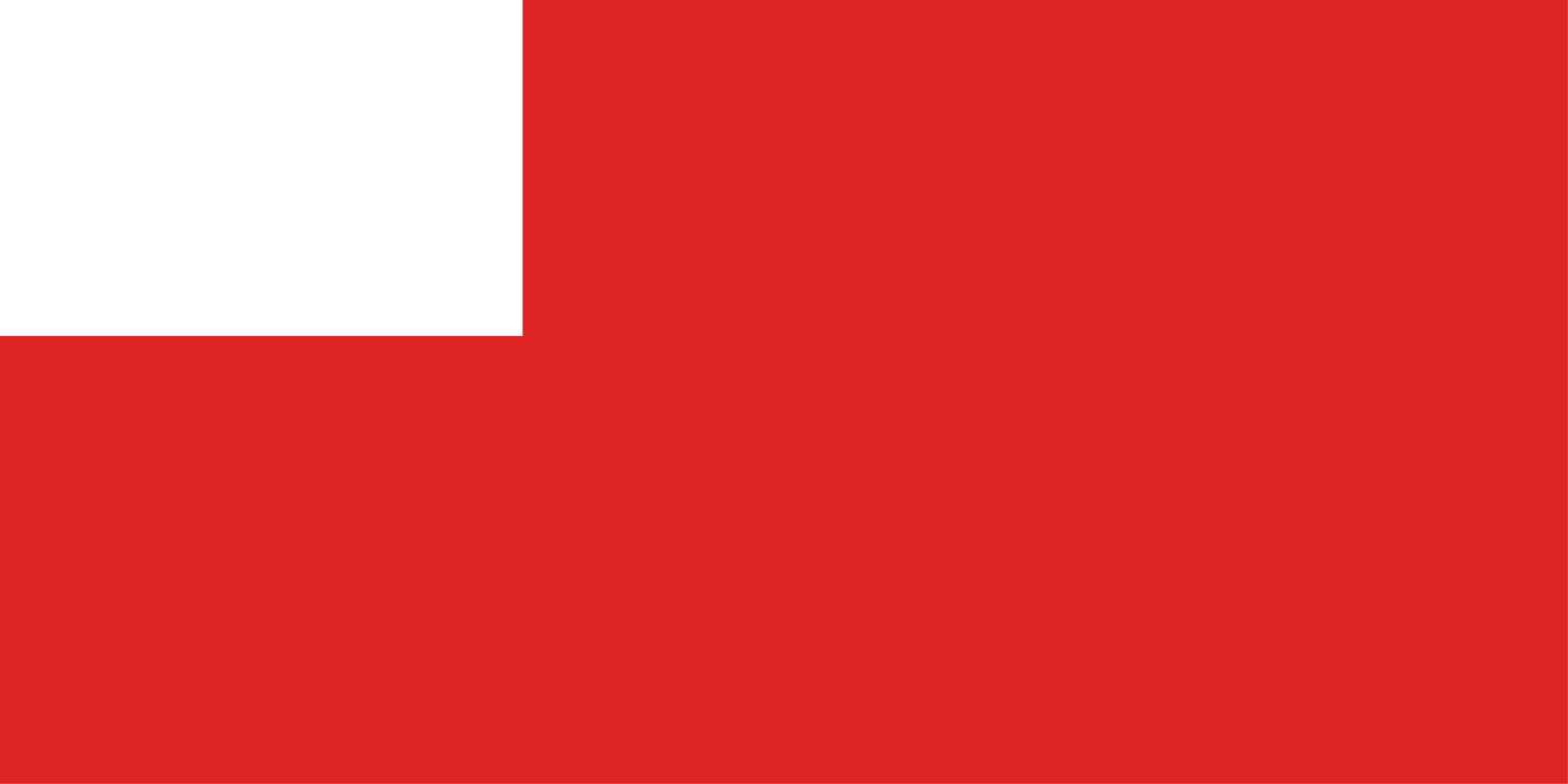
Jambi

Johor-Riau

Langkat

Linge

Pagaruyung

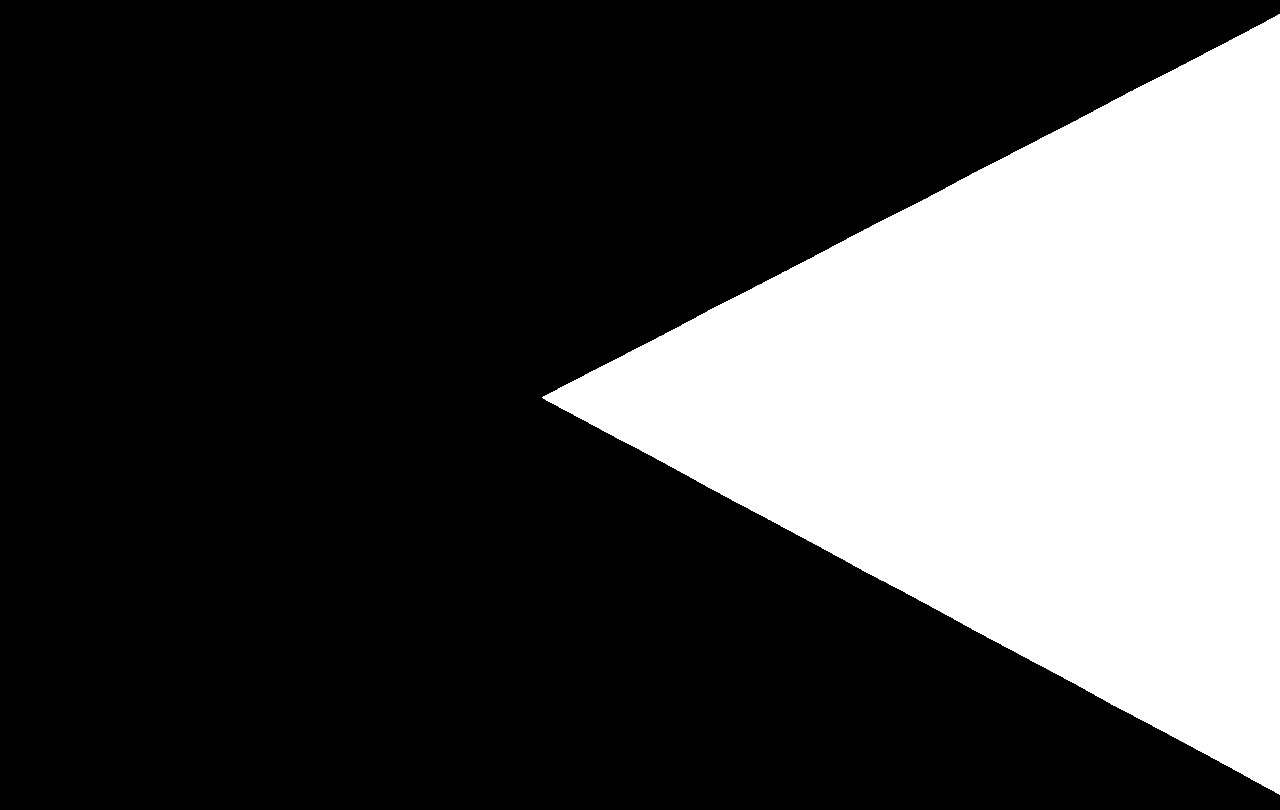
Palembang

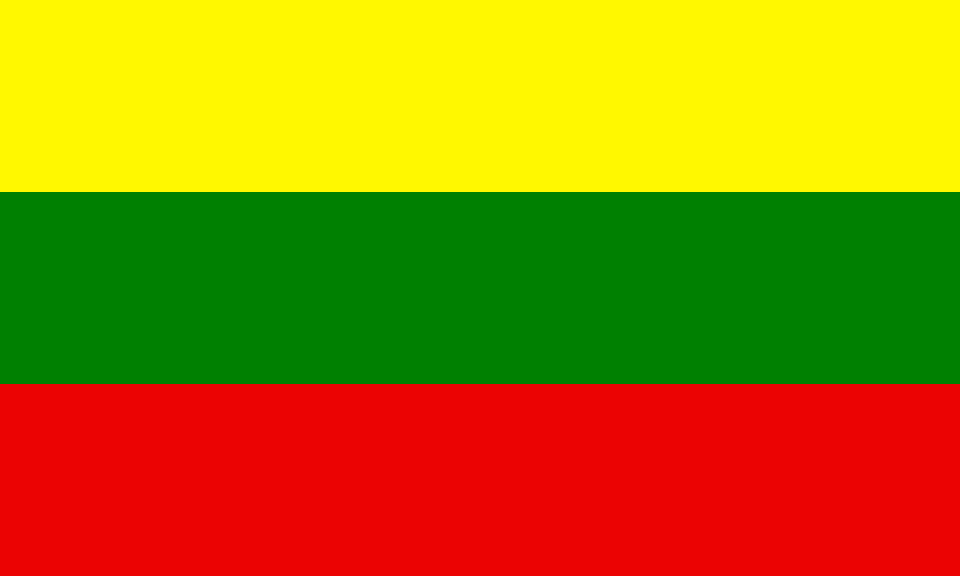
Flag of the Sultan of Palembang under Sultan Iskandar Mahmud Badaruddin

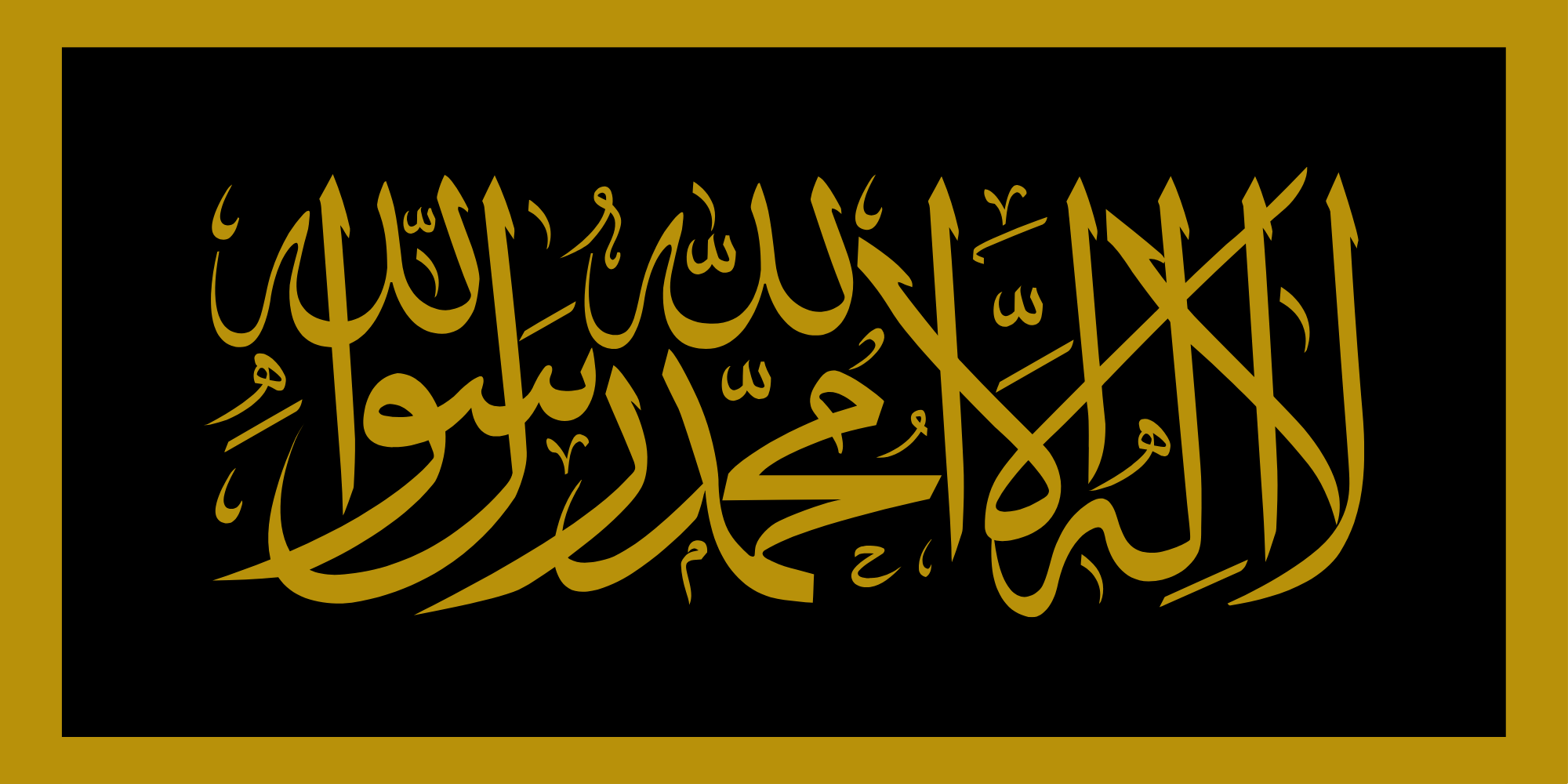
Palace Guard Flag under Sultan Iskandar Mahmud Badaruddin

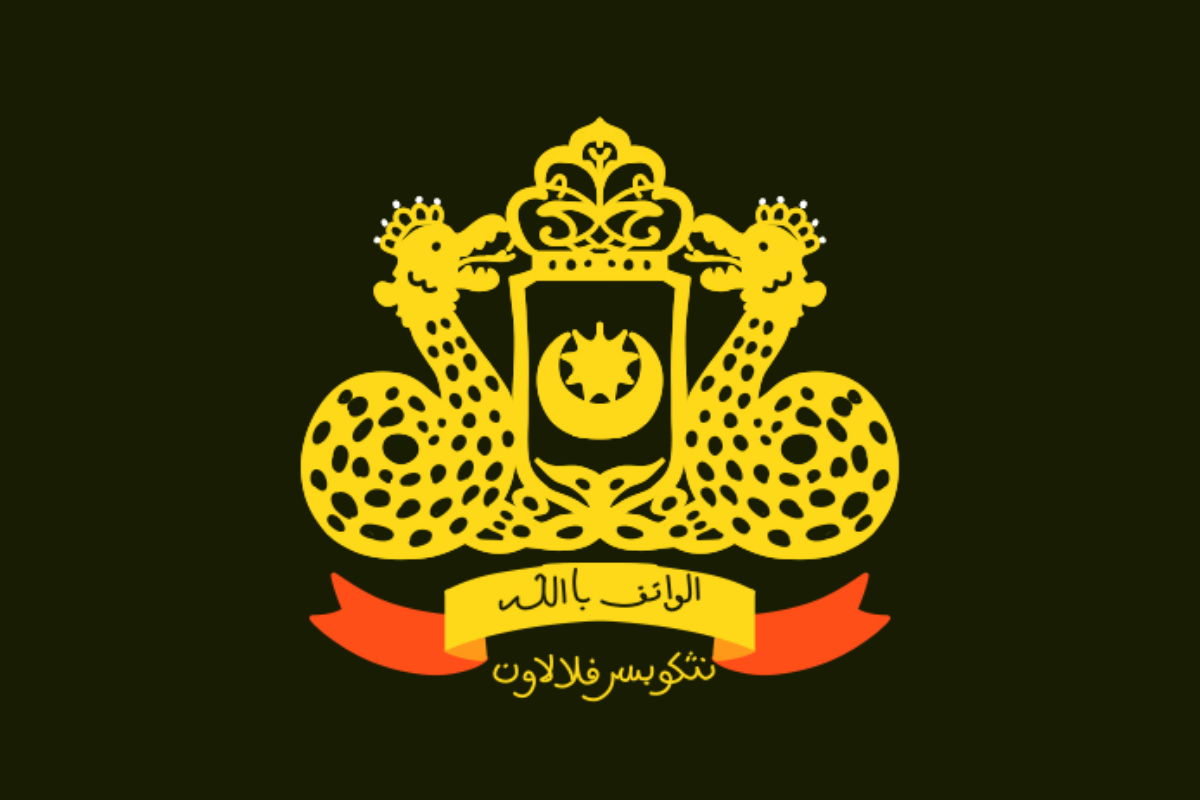
Pelalawan

Riau-Lingga

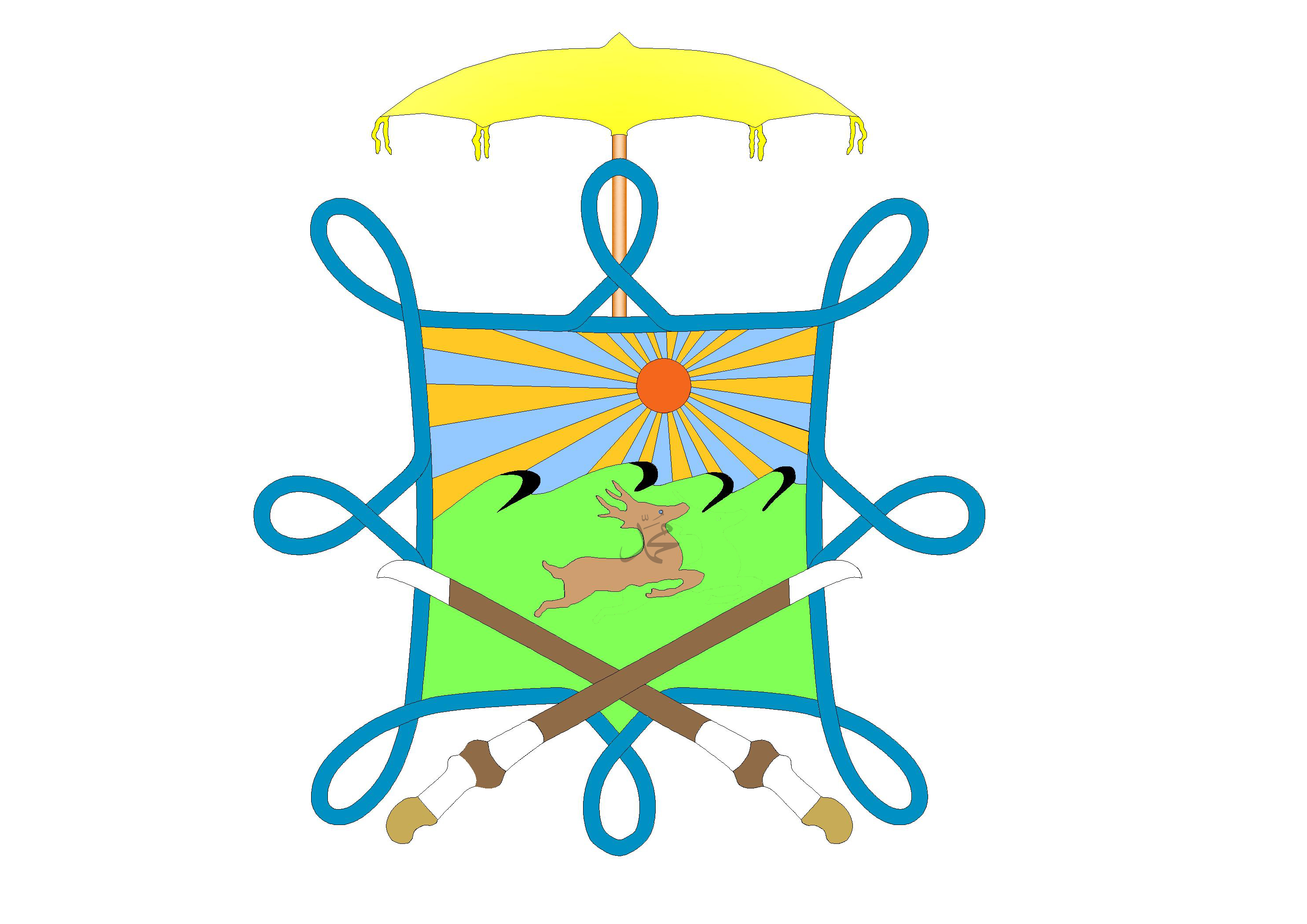
Sekala Brak

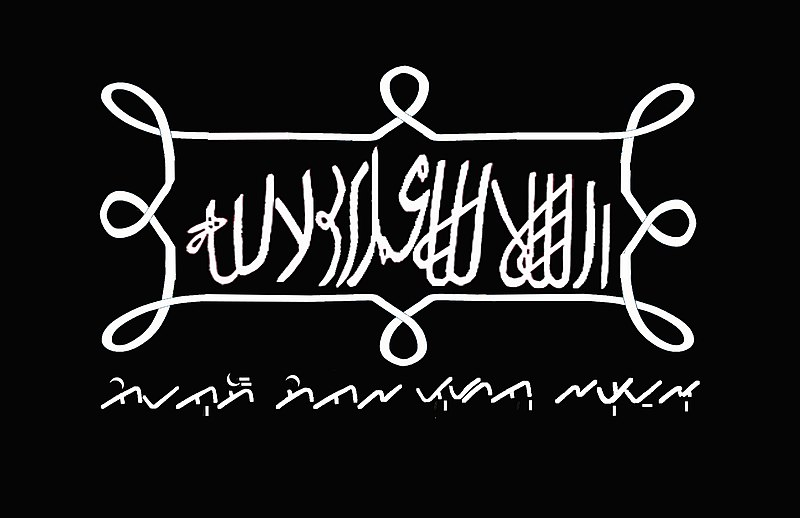
Sekala Brak (banner)

Siak

==== Lesser Sunda Islands ====
Badung

Bali

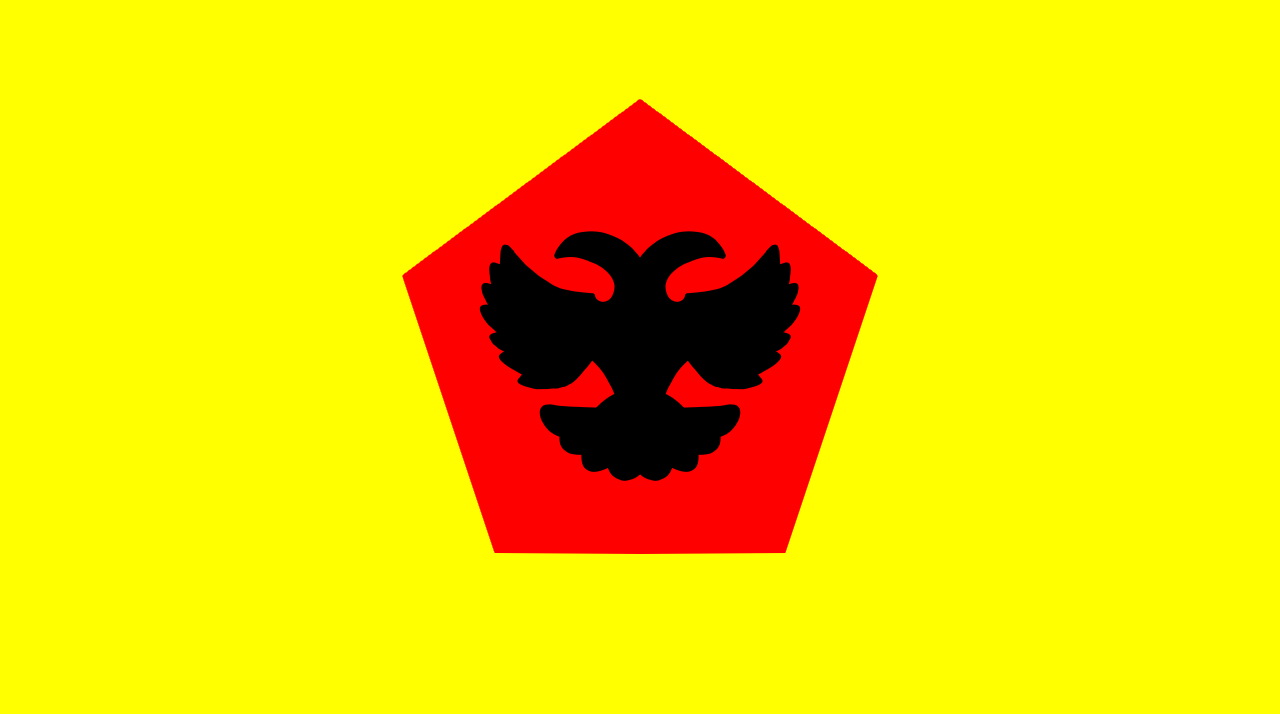
Bima

Karangasem

Klungkung

Lombok

Sumbawa

Sumbawa (war flag)

==== Maluku Islands ====
Bacan (Note: Based off the description in Dirk Rühl's Vlaggen van den Oost-Indischen Archipel (1600-1942))

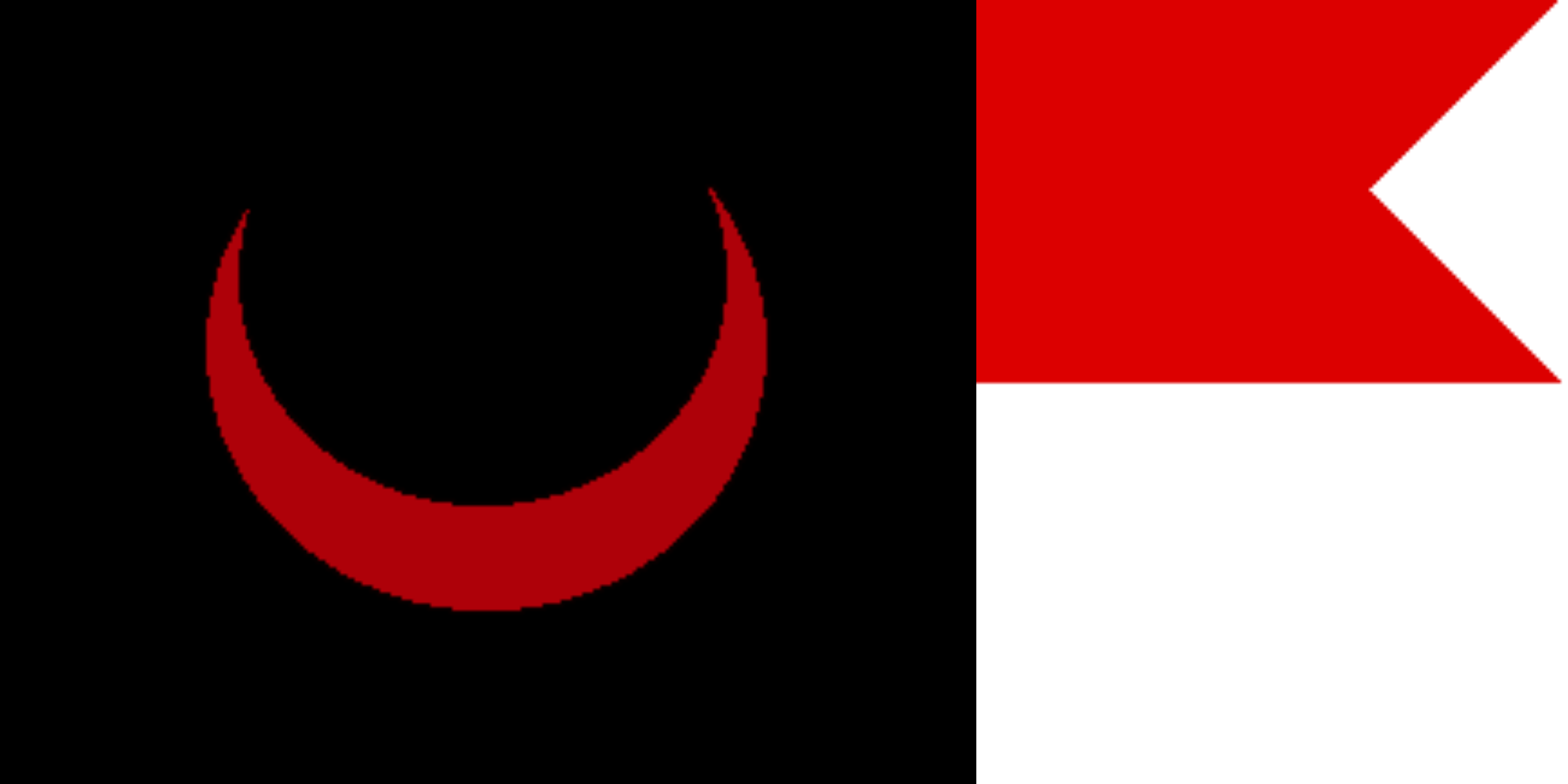
Bicoli

Ternate

Naval ensign of Ternate (16–17th century)

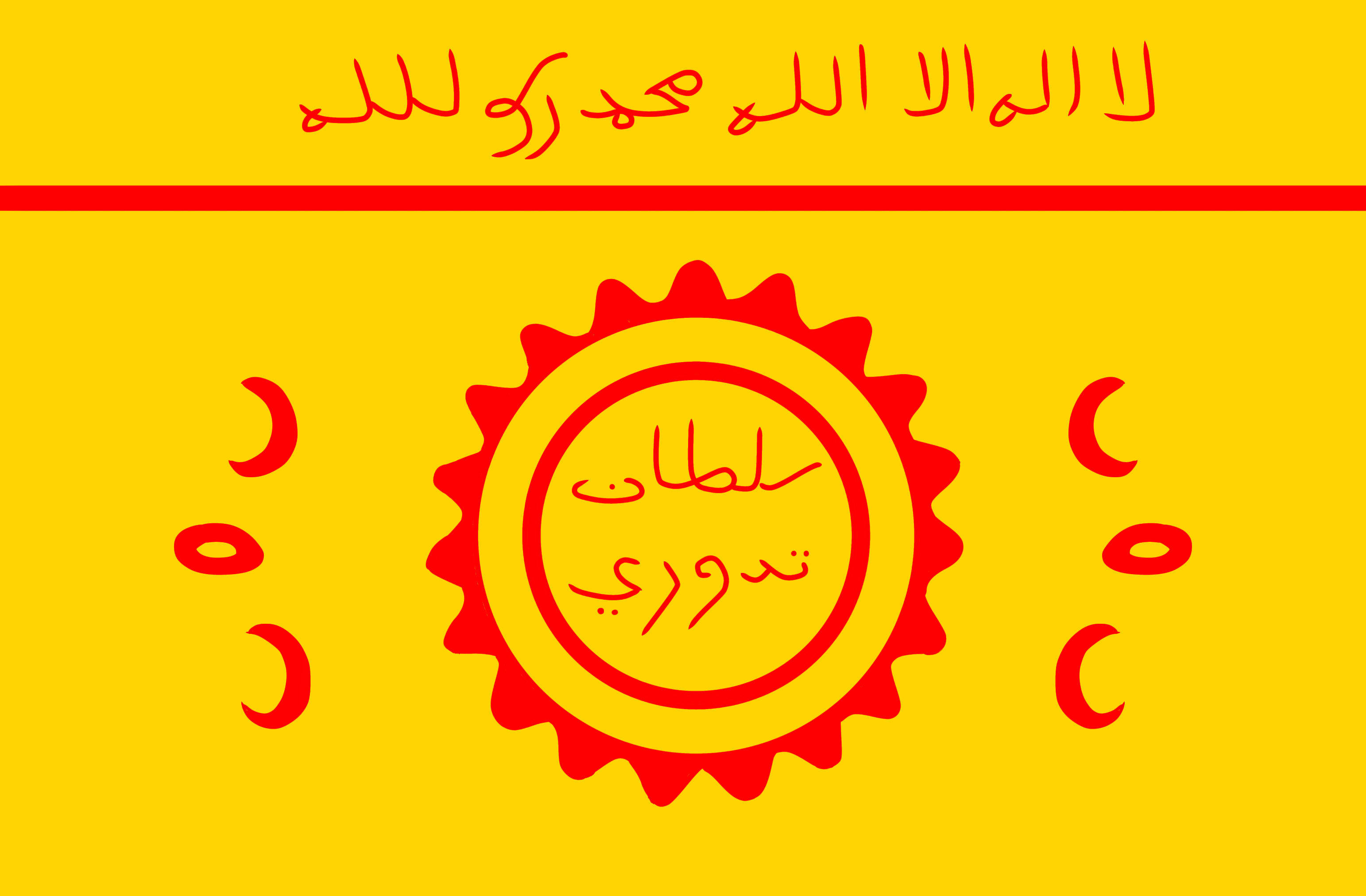
Tidore

Kingdom of Iha

==== New Guinea ====
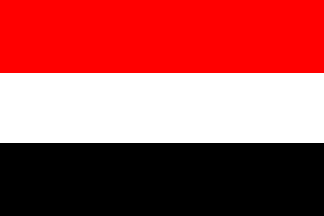
Kaimana

=== Ottoman flags of Aceh ===
Flag of the Ottoman Empire (1569–1793)

Flag of the Ottoman Empire (1793–1844)

Flag of the Ottoman Empire (1844–1903)

Imperial flag of the Ottoman Sultan (1900–1903)

=== Qing flags of Lanfang ===
Flag of the Qing China (1862–1884)

Imperial flag of the Qing Emperor (1862–1884)

Lanfang Republic flag (Luo Xianglin's rendition) (Note: "The flag of the Republic of Lanfang is a yellow rectangular flag with a yellow field and red lettering, inscribed with the words ‘The Great General System of Lanfang’.")

Lanfang Republic flag (Kao Chung Xi's rendition) (Note: "...The flag is a rectangle yellow flag with the word Lan Fang Ta Tong Chi.")

Pennant of the President of Lanfang (Note: "...The flag is a rectangle yellow flag with the word Lan Fang Ta Tong Chi. The president flag is a triangular yellow flag with the word Chuao (General)...")

=== Colonial-era flags ===
Flag of Portugal (flown 1512–1521)

Flag of Portugal (1521–1578)

Flag of Portugal (1578–1640)

Flag of the Iberian Union (1580–1640)

Royal flag of Philip II of Spain (1580–1640)

Banner of Arms of House of Habsburg (1580–1640)

The Prince's Flag (1610–1795)

First flag of the Dutch East Indies Company (1610–1795)

Flag of Portugal (1616–1640) - Putative flag

Dutch East India Company flag, adopted with red stripe around 1630 or 1663 and beyond, for the purpose of better visibility at sea against a light sky

Maritime flag of Batavia (18th century)

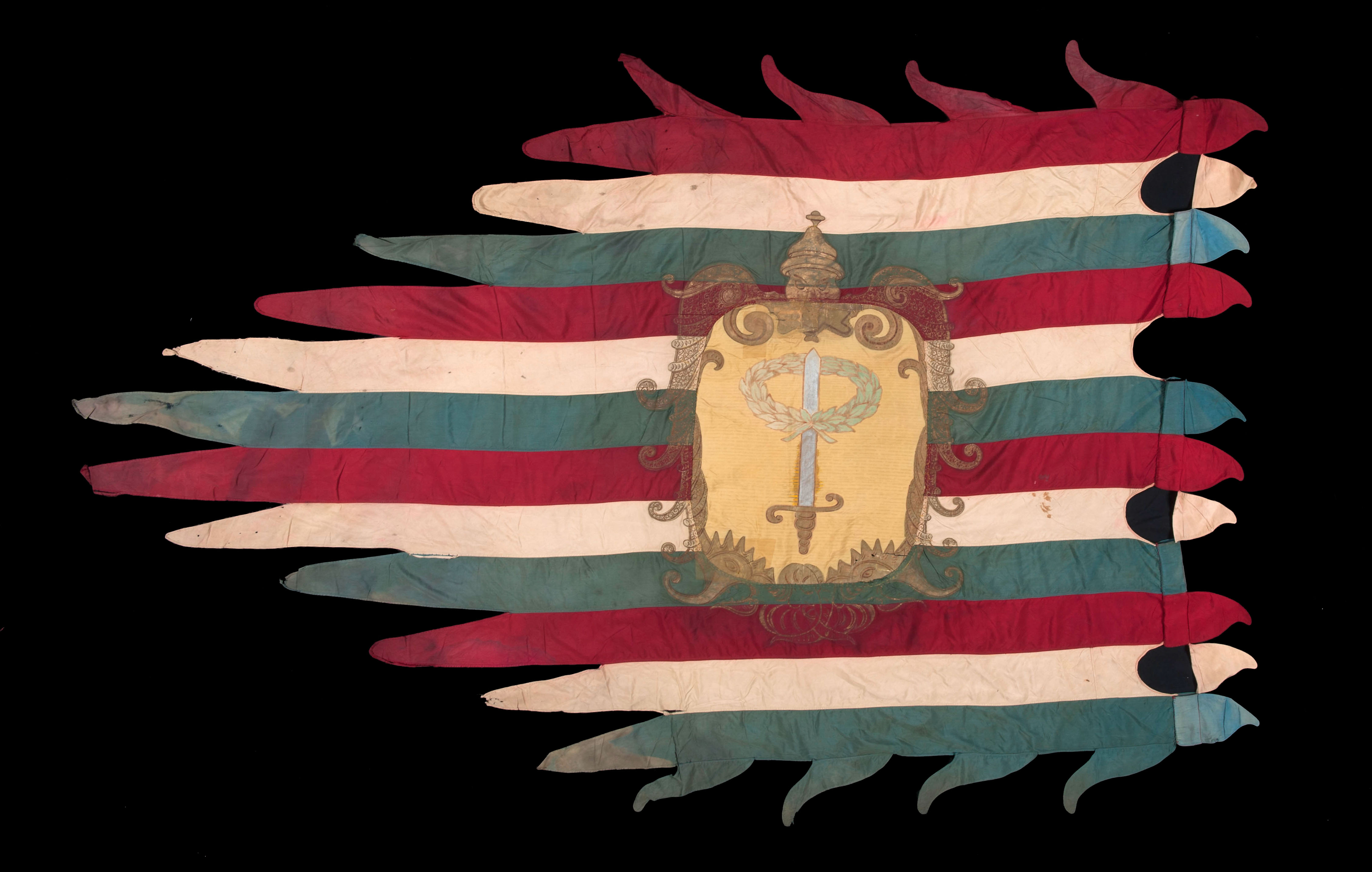
Maritime flag of Batavia (18th century)

Flag of Portugal (1640–1667)

States Flag (1652–1796)

Flag of Portugal (1667–1707)

Flag of the Portuguese Empire (1706–1750, 1826–1830)

Flag of the Amsterdam Chamber of the Dutch East Indies Company

Flag of the Portuguese Empire (1750–1816)

First French Empire (1806–1811)

Flag of the Batavian Republic (1796–1806)

Imperial standard of the First French Empire

British Empire (1811–1816)

British East India Company (1811–1815)

Royal standard of the United Kingdom

Flag of the United Kingdom of Portugal, Brazil and Algarves (December 1815 – September 1822)

Royal flag of the Netherlands (1816–1908)

Flag of Portugal, land use (1830–1850)

Flag of Portugal, sea use (1830–1850)

==== Dutch East Indies ====
Royal flag of the Netherlands (1908–1949)

Flag of the Dutch East Indies

Flag and pennant of the Governor of the Dutch East Indies (1800–1949)

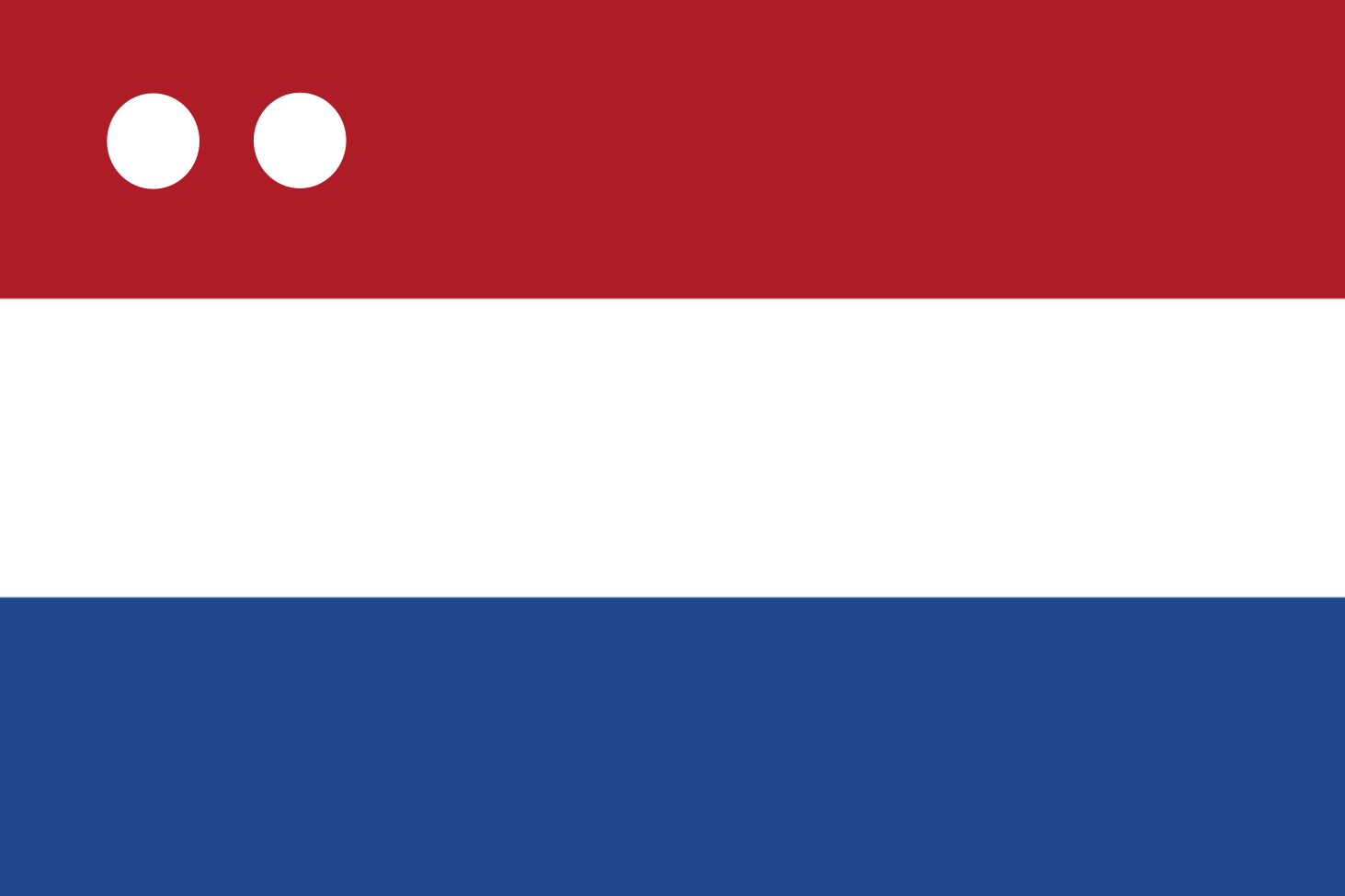
Distinctive flag of the Governor of the Dutch East Indies (1800–1928)

Distinctive flag of the Governor of the Dutch East Indies (1928–1949)

Distinctive flag of a resident of the Dutch East Indies (1928–1949)

Flag of Dutch New Guinea (1961–1962)

Distinctive flag of the Governor of the Dutch New Guinea (1930–1962)

Flag of Sumatra under Dutch rule

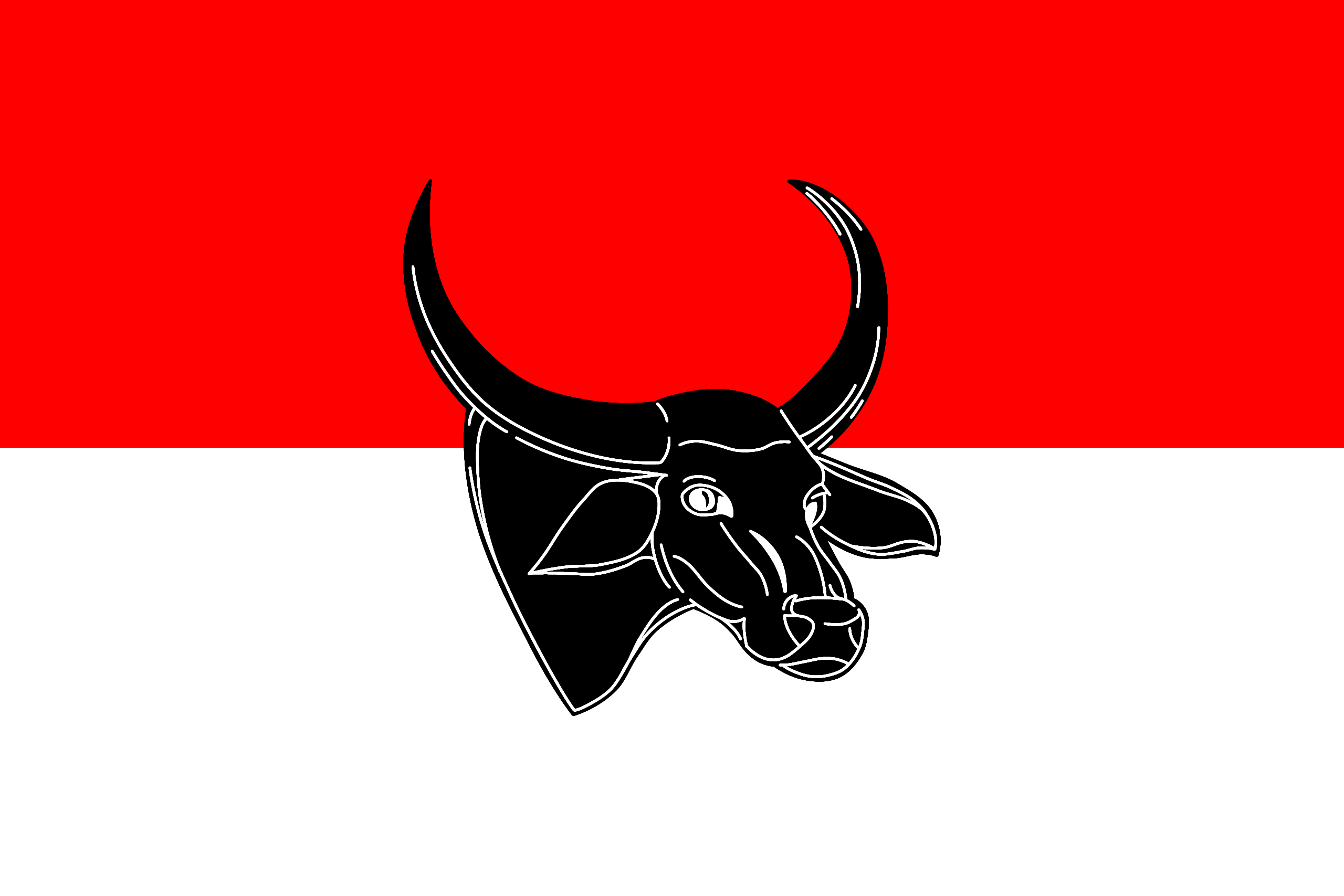
Flag of Perhimpoenan Indonesia (Note: A precursor design of the Indonesian Flag used by Indonesian and Malay nationalists)

Flag of Indische Partij

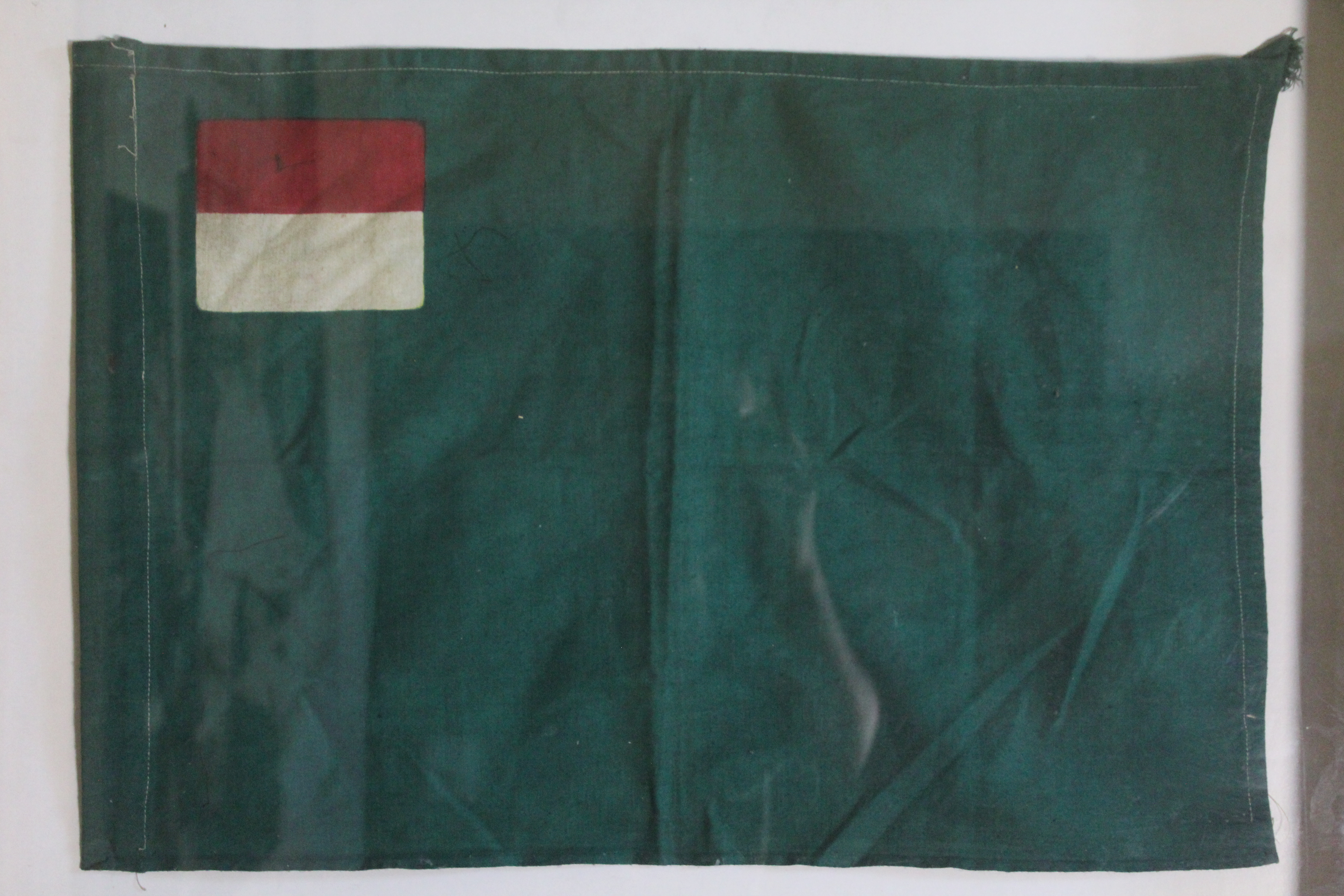
Flag of the Taman Siswa Association

=== Japanese occupation of the Dutch East Indies ===
Flag of the Japanese-occupied of the Dutch East Indies under the Empire of Japan (1942–1945)

War flag of the Imperial Japanese Army (1942–1945)

Naval ensign of the Imperial Japanese Navy (1942–1945)

Imperial standard of the Emperor of Japan (1942–1945)

Flag of PETA / Pembela Tanah Air (1943–1945)

Flag of PETA / Giyūgun Bali (1944–1945)

=== Indonesian National Revolution ===
Hotel Yamato flag

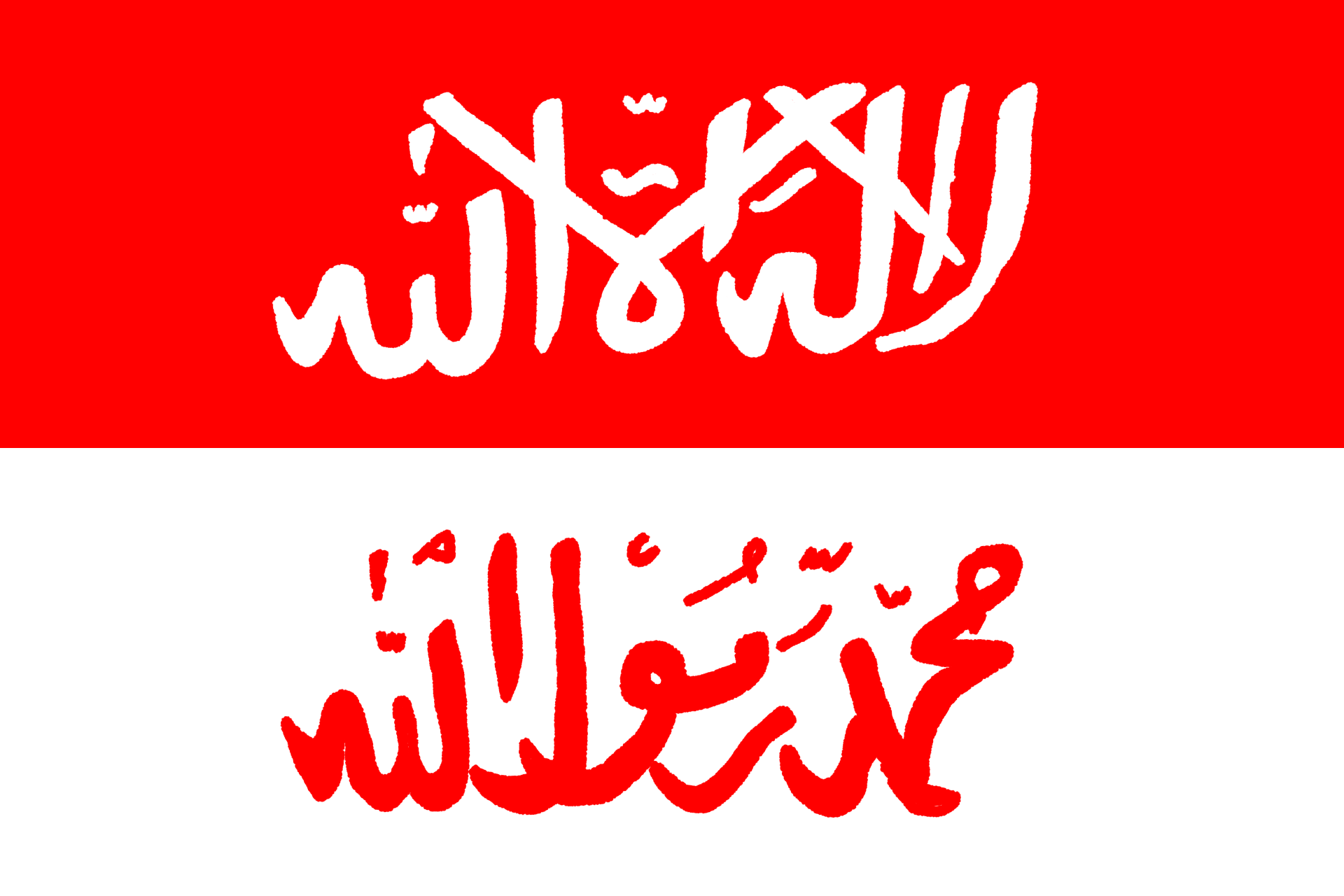
Banner (panji) variant of Laskar Hizbullah

Legion of the Just Ruler

Indonesian Youth Force

Symbol of Laskar Napindo

Central Sulawesi Youth Movement

Laskar Sunda Kecil

Indonesian People's Revolutionary Front

Indonesian Socialist Youth

Central All-Indonesian Workers Organization

Tentara Republik Indonesia Pelajar (TRIP; East Java)

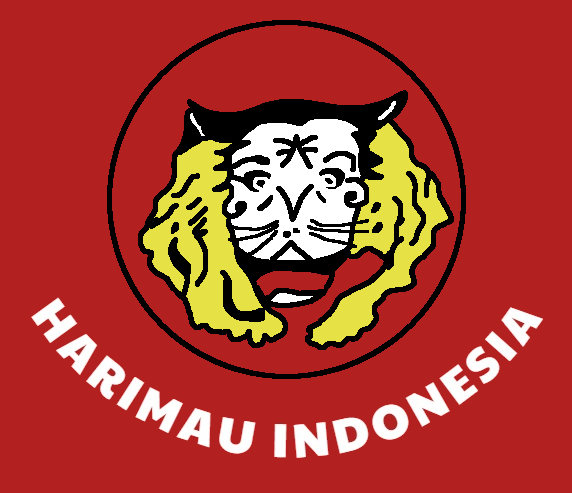
Harimau Indonesia Battalion

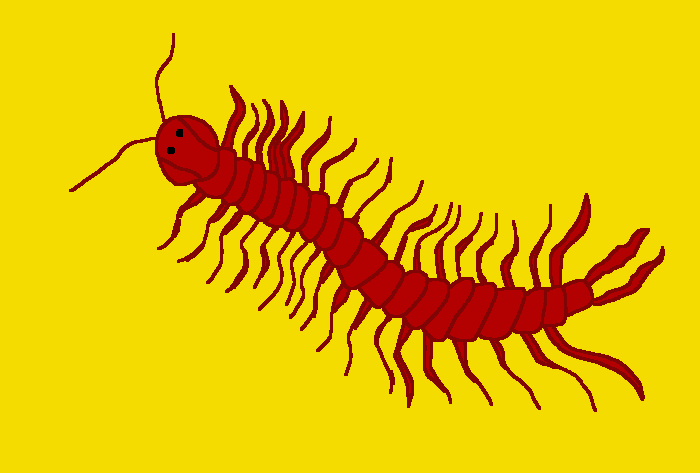
Lipang Badjeng

== Flags of separatist movements and terror groups ==
Free Aceh Movement (historical)

Free Riau Movement (historical)

South Maluku (historical, ongoing in exile) (Note: Historical in Indonesia through the signing of the Malino II Accord. Ongoing in the Netherlands through the South Maluku Republic government in exile.)

Free Papua Movement (ongoing)

East Indonesia Mujahideen (historical)

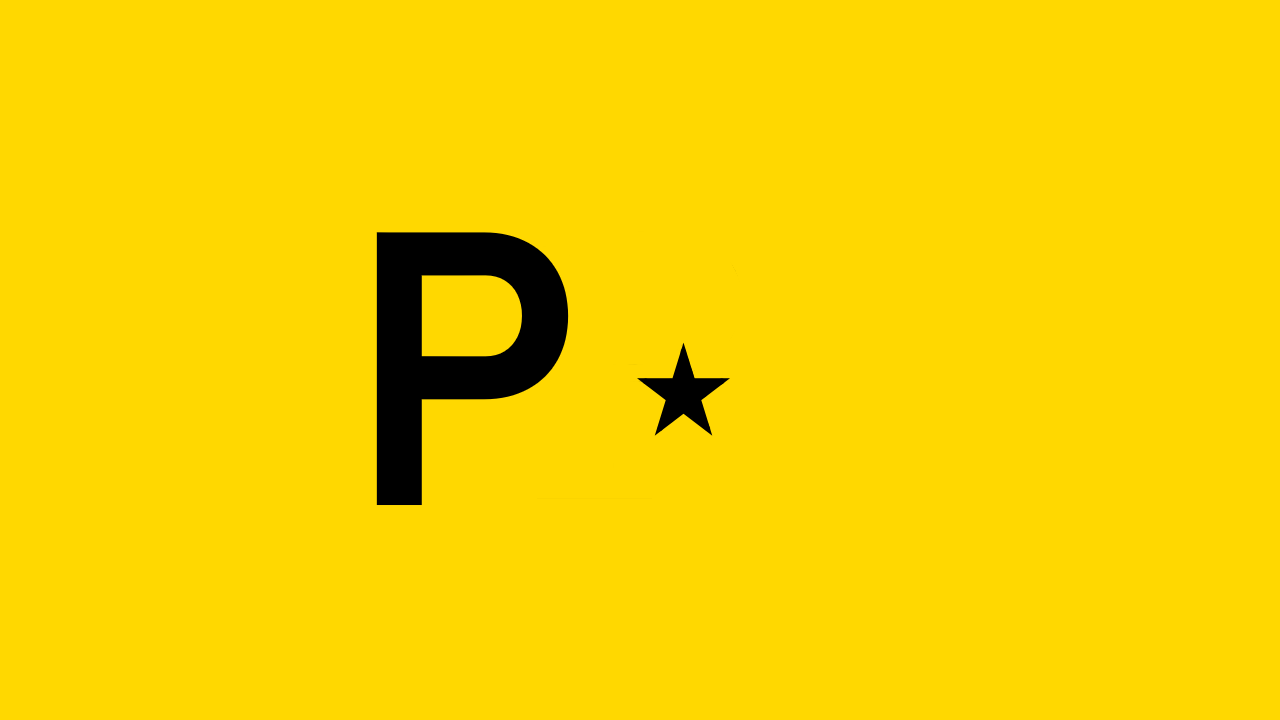
Permesta (historical)

Some separatists use the flags of pre-colonial states.

=== Islamic State of Indonesia ===
State flag (official)

War flag (official)

Army flag (official)

South Sulawesi Guerrilla Unit

NII/Fi Sabilillah Faction flag (c. 1983) (Note: Appeared in a 1983 court photo.)

Darul Islam flag (unofficial) (Note: Whilst not accurate to represent nor used by the DI/NII, It is used by modern DI/NII underground movements and sympathizers.)

== Islamic organizations ==
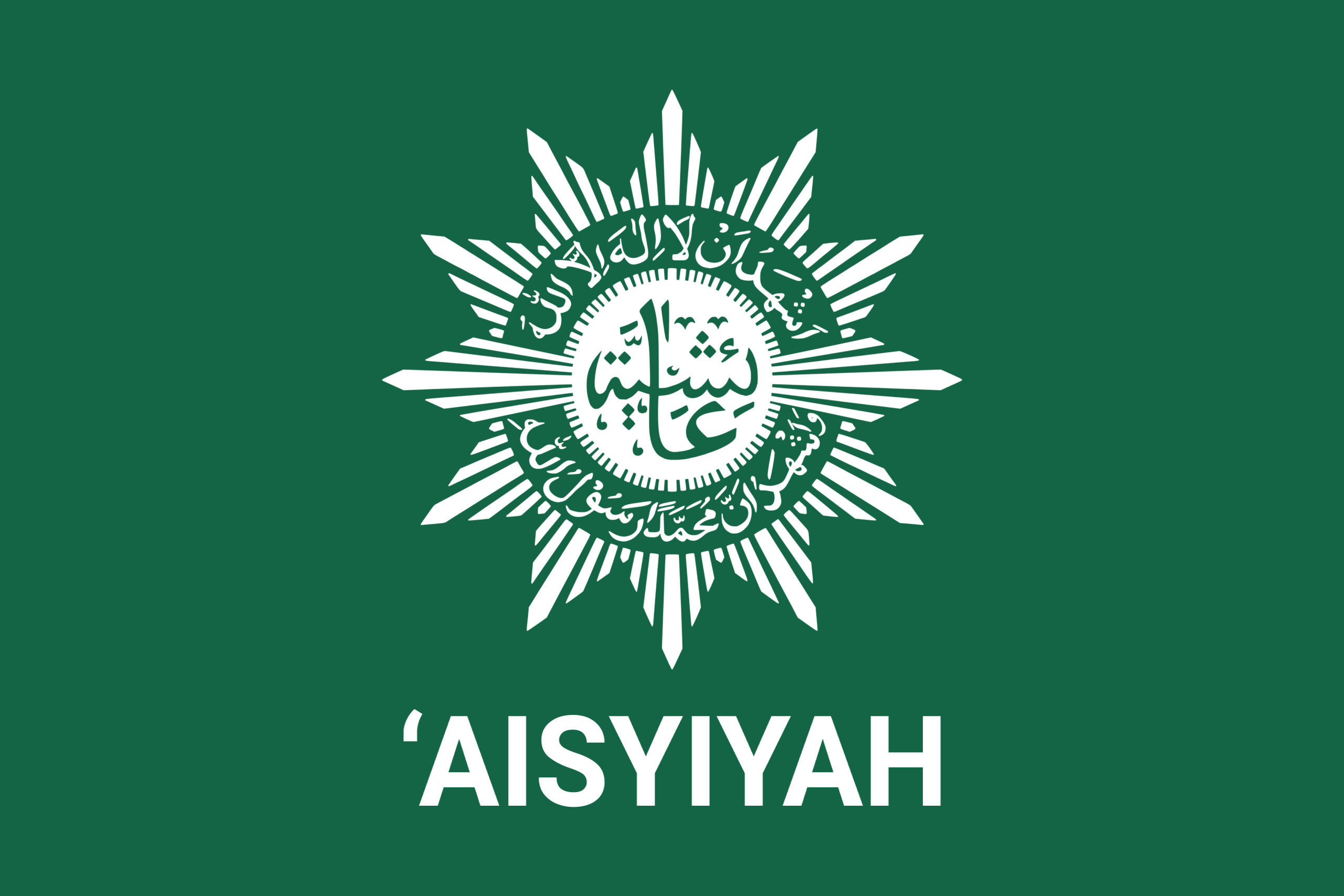
Aisyiyah

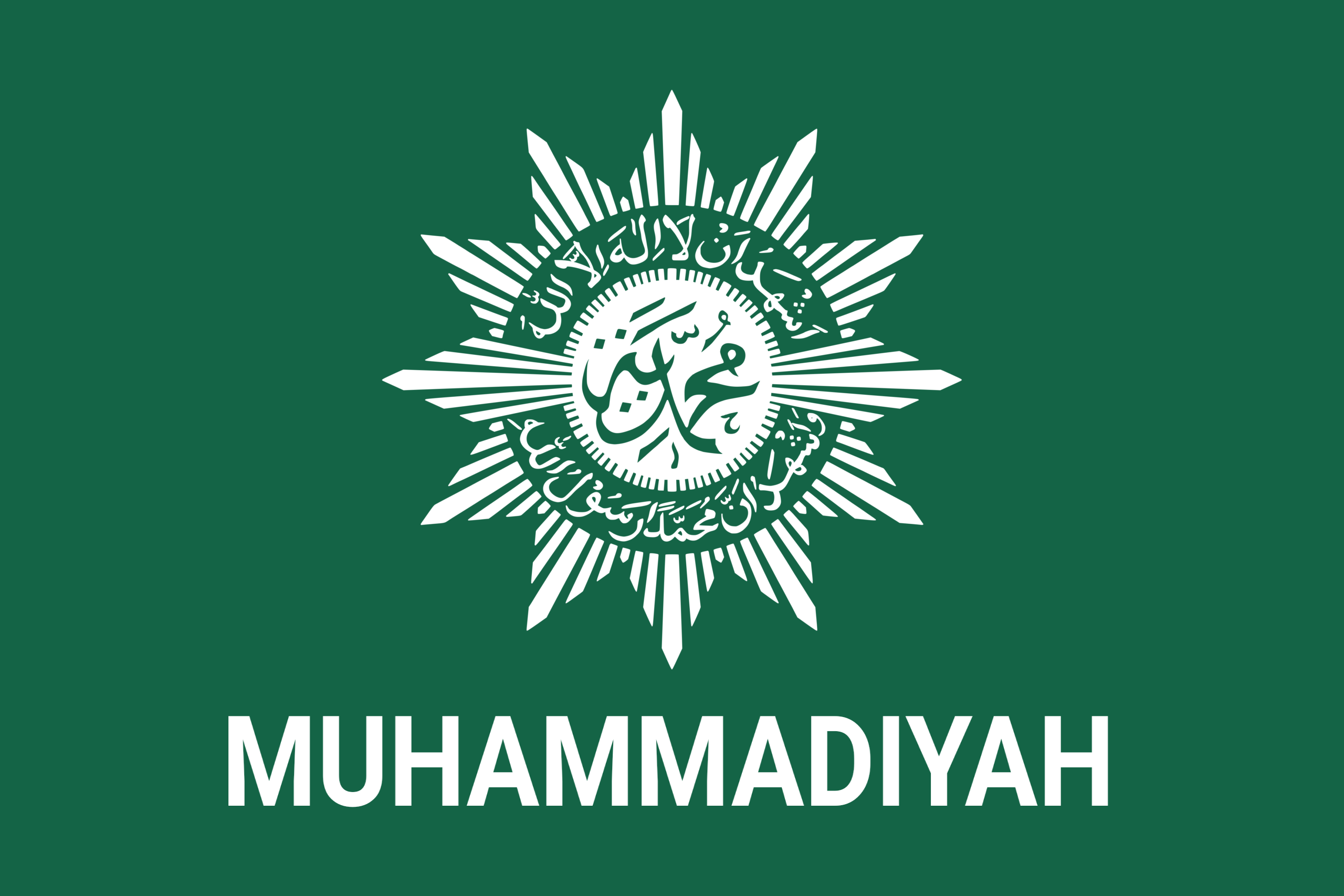
Muhammadiyah

Nahdlatul Ulama

Indonesia Arab Association (historical)

Laskar Jihad (historical)

== See also ==
- Armorial of Indonesia
- Flag of Indonesia
