= Flags of Aceh =

Province of Aceh

The provincial flag of Aceh, (Note: Indonesian: Bendera Aceh, Acehnese: Alam Acèh pronounced [alam atʃɛh]; Jawoe: علم اچيه, Gayo: Mandera Aceh) adopted on December 10, 2007, features the province's coat of arms on a green field. A pentagon shaped like a kopiah, inside it, a scale with two rencongs at the top, under it, a stalk of rice, cotton, and factory chimneys, with a mosque dome and a pen pointing at a book in between, with the province's motto in Sanskrit below, reading: Pancacita ('Five Ideals')

The topic of a new Acehnese flag unique from other provincial flags has been controversial due to popular proposals being associated with the separatist Free Aceh Movement. Indonesian law prohibits provincial symbols from resembling those of banned organisations.

== Symbolism ==
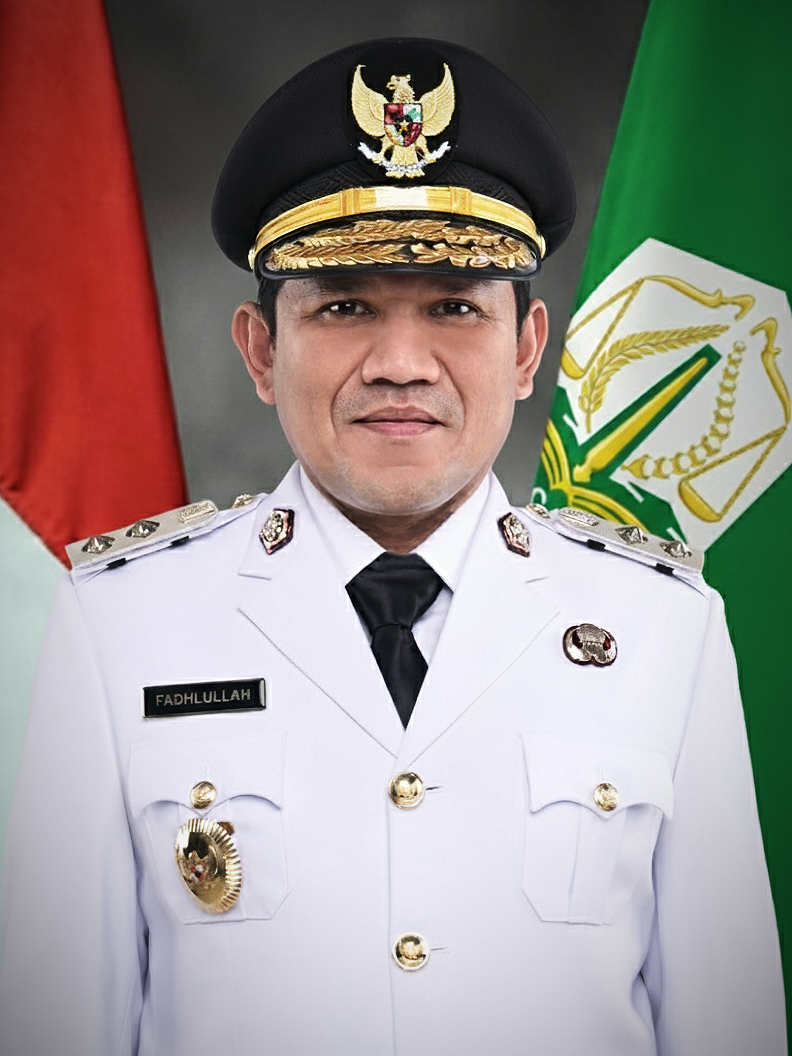
Fadhullah with the flag of Indonesia and Aceh in the background

The coat of arms has the motto Pancacita ('Five Ideals'), namely justice, heroism, prosperity, harmony, and welfare. The symbolism of Pancacita's motto can also found in the individual symbols inside the shield:

- Scale representing justice
- Rencong representing heroism
- Rice, cotton, and factory chimneys representing welfare
- Mosque dome representing harmony
- Book and qalam pen representing prosperity

The mosque dome, book, and qalam pen may also represent Aceh's spirituality and religiosity, especially Islam, and knowledge. The coat of arms colours also has the following meanings:

- White representing purity
- Yellow representing prosperity
- Green representing prosperity and welfare

== History ==
=== Alam Peudeueng (15th/16th century – 1904) ===
Flag used by the Aceh Sultanate in 1865

Alam Peudeueng (Jawoe: علم ڤدڠ pronounced [alam pɯdɯ(ə̯)ŋ]; The Sword Standard) is the flag of the Aceh Sultanate. It consists of a white crescent moon and a star in the centre above a white sword pointing to the right on a red field.

Before the creation of the Sword Standard, Aceh previously used the Ottoman flag as its own. Over time, Aceh developed several of its own flag designs, drawing influence from Ottoman motifs, particularly the crescent and star, which later evolves into the Sword Standard. The Sword Standard was used as early as the 16th century, with some saying its usage goes back to 1412 with the unification of Aceh states, and was widely used by the Acehnese people. The flag remained the official flag of the Aceh Sultanate until its annexation into the Dutch East Indies after the Aceh War.

Flag of the Ottoman Empire with an eight-pointed star, the main inspiration for Acehnese flags

The crescent and star flag used by the Sultanate of Aceh, more commonly used before the Sword Standard

The Sword Standard

=== Bintang Buleuen (1976–2005, 2013–2016) ===
The Moon Star flag

Alam Bintang Buleuen (Jawoe: علم بينتڠ بولن pronounced [alam bintaŋ bulɯ(ə̯)n]; the Moon Star flag), also known as Pusaka Nanggroe (Jawoe: ڤوساک نڠڬرو pronounced [pusaka naŋɡrɔ(ə̯)]; the State's Heirloom) is the flag of the Free Aceh Movement (GAM), an organisation that seeks to declare independence from Indonesia. It consists of a white crescent moon and a star in the centre, between six horizontal stripes, alternating between two thin stripes of white and one thick stripe of black, on a red field.

The Moon Star flag was used as the official flag of GAM until its dissolution with the signing of a Memorandum of Understanding in Helsinki in 2005. In 2013, the Moon Star flag alongside the coat of arms of GAM was officially adapted as the new symbols of the province, stating in law, recognising the symbols to not be a symbol of separatism and instead a cultural and uniting symbol of Aceh, removing it of its past separatism relation.

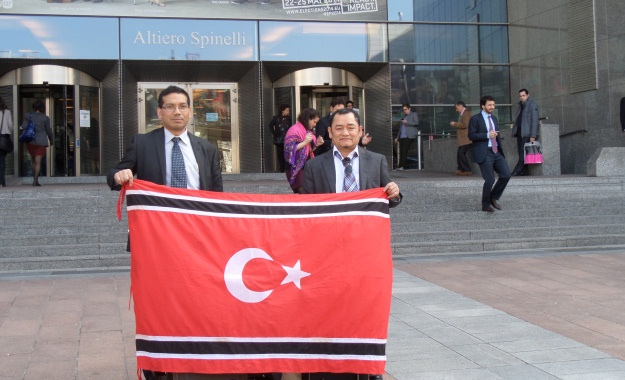
Arif Fadillah, Chairman of the Democratic Party Faction of the Aceh House of Representatives, and Bukhari Raden, holding the Moon Star flag in front of the Altiero Spinelli building in 2014

With it, an official instruction of the flag is published as well. The flag construction goes as follows:

1. The flag of Aceh is rectangular flag. A red band two-thirds the height, two straight white lines at the top and two straight white lines at the bottom. One black line at the top and one black line at the bottom (in-between the white lines), and in the middle, a white crescent moon and star.
2. One black line at the top and one black line at the bottom, twice the size of the white lines that flank it.
3. Two straight white lines at the top and at the bottom are the same size; half the size of the black lines.
4. A black line at the top and at the bottom are twice as large as the white lines.
5. Then, A red stripe on the top and the bottom (above and below the white stripes respectively) are the same size as the black lines.

The flag was the de facto flag of Aceh until May 12, 2016, where it was rejected through the Minister of Home Affairs Decree 188.34-4791 of 2016, as they deem the Qanun to be in violation of Regulation of Government Number 77 of 2007. Iskandar Usman Al-Farlaky, a member of the Aceh House of Representatives, argues that the decree is invalid, he stated that according to Article 145 of the Constitution Number 32 of 2004, a regional law can be rejected by the president for no longer than 60 days, and if nothing is said about the regional law, then it is official. Since 2016 and onwards, Alam Acèh is the official flag of Aceh, as flying the Bintang Buleuën flag is still outlawed by law.

== Proposed flags ==
While the province of Aceh officially uses a plain-coloured field with the state coat of arms in the middle like the other Indonesian provinces as stated by law, many consider the current flag to be unrepresentative of Aceh's identity. As a result, there have been ongoing efforts and campaigns advocating for the adoption of a new flag that better reflects Acehnese culture and history. A sizable portion of Acehnese society prefers to use the Moon Star flag or the Sword Standard flag to represent Aceh.

Despite its official status as the flag of Aceh from 2013 to 2016. The Moon Star flag has been the subject of controversy due to its historical association with GAM. In response, the Sword Standard has gained popularity as an alternative, with a considerable number of Acehnese society viewing it as a more culturally appropriate and historically representative symbol for the province.

=== Other proposed flags ===
After the backlash on May 16, 2016, Fakhrurrazi, Yudhistira Maulana, and Hamdani designed and proposed a flag and coat of arms for the province of Aceh as a judicial review to the Supreme Court of Indonesia. The flag is the Sword Standard but with a green field and a yellow crescent, star, and sword. Led by Yulius, this judicial review was rejected by the Supreme Court on February 14, 2017.

Alam Peudeueng Ijô Kunèng
The Green and Yellow Sword Standard

The Green and Yellow Sword Standard and the Red Sword Standard seen flying together on the Pante Pirak bridge.

== Political flags ==
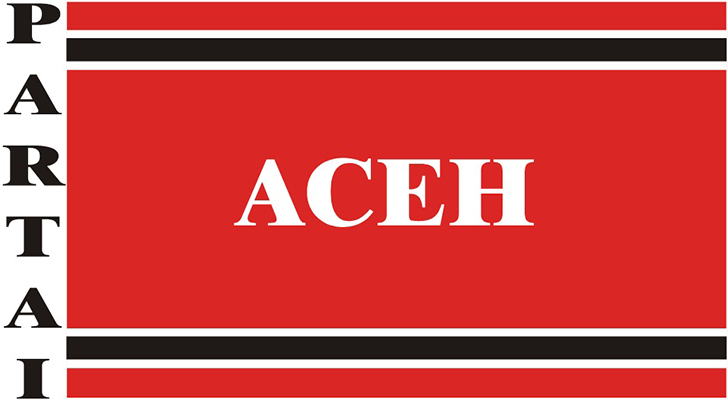
Aceh Party
(Partai Aceh)

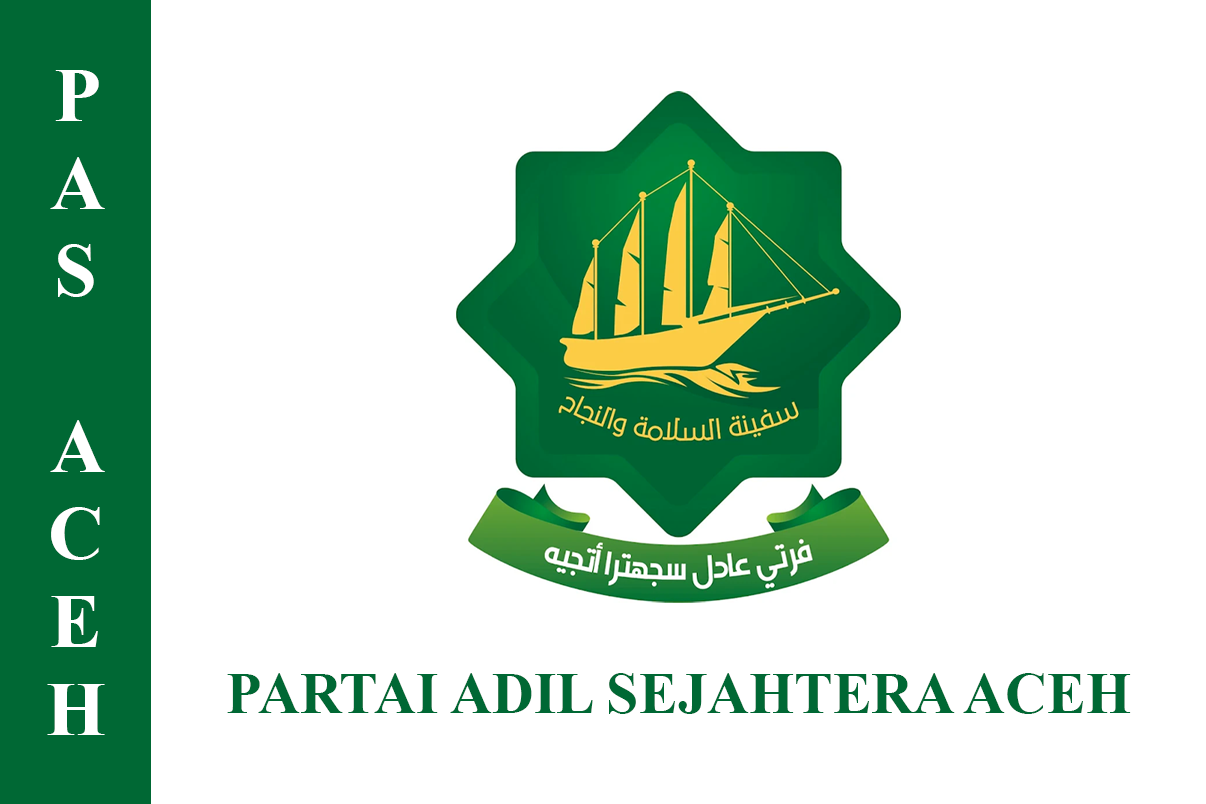
Aceh Just and Prosperous Party
(Partai Adil Sejahtera Aceh)

Nanggroe Aceh Party
(Partai Nanggroe Aceh)

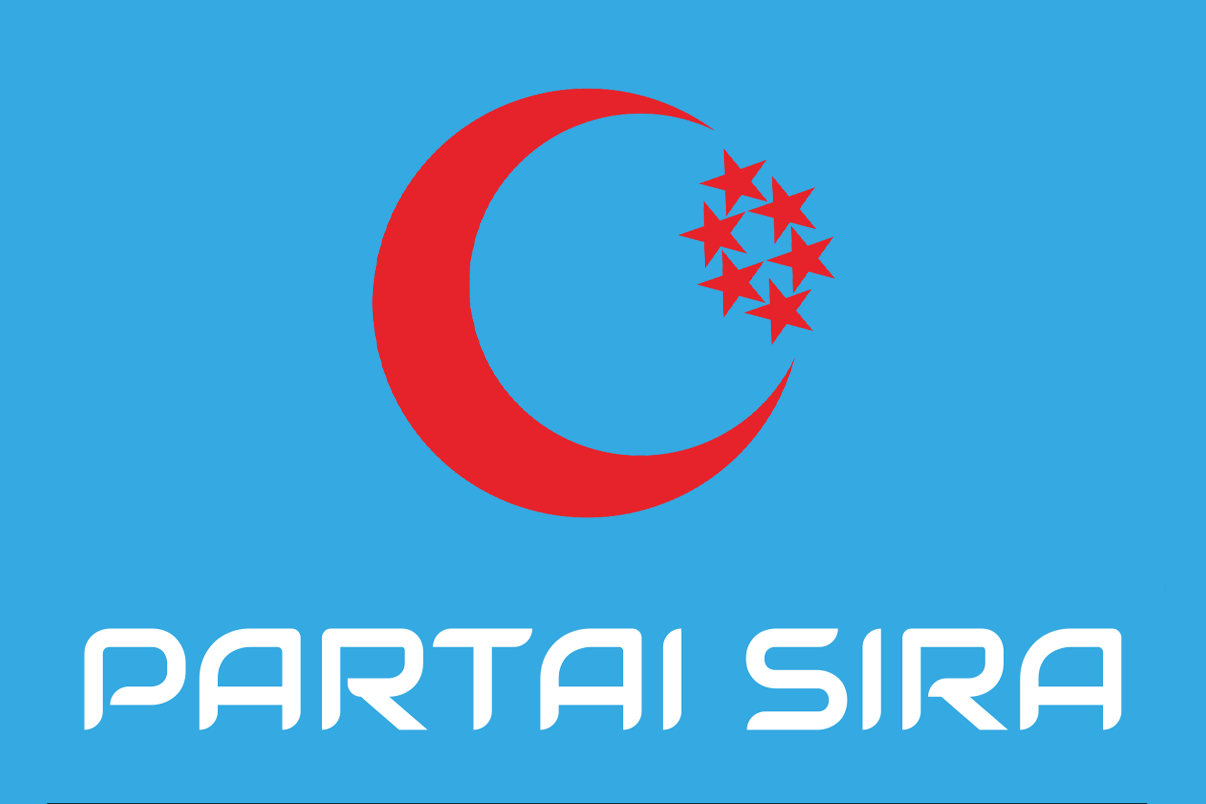
Independent Solidity of the Acehnese Party
(Partai Solidaritas Independen Rakyat Aceh)

== Regency and city flags ==
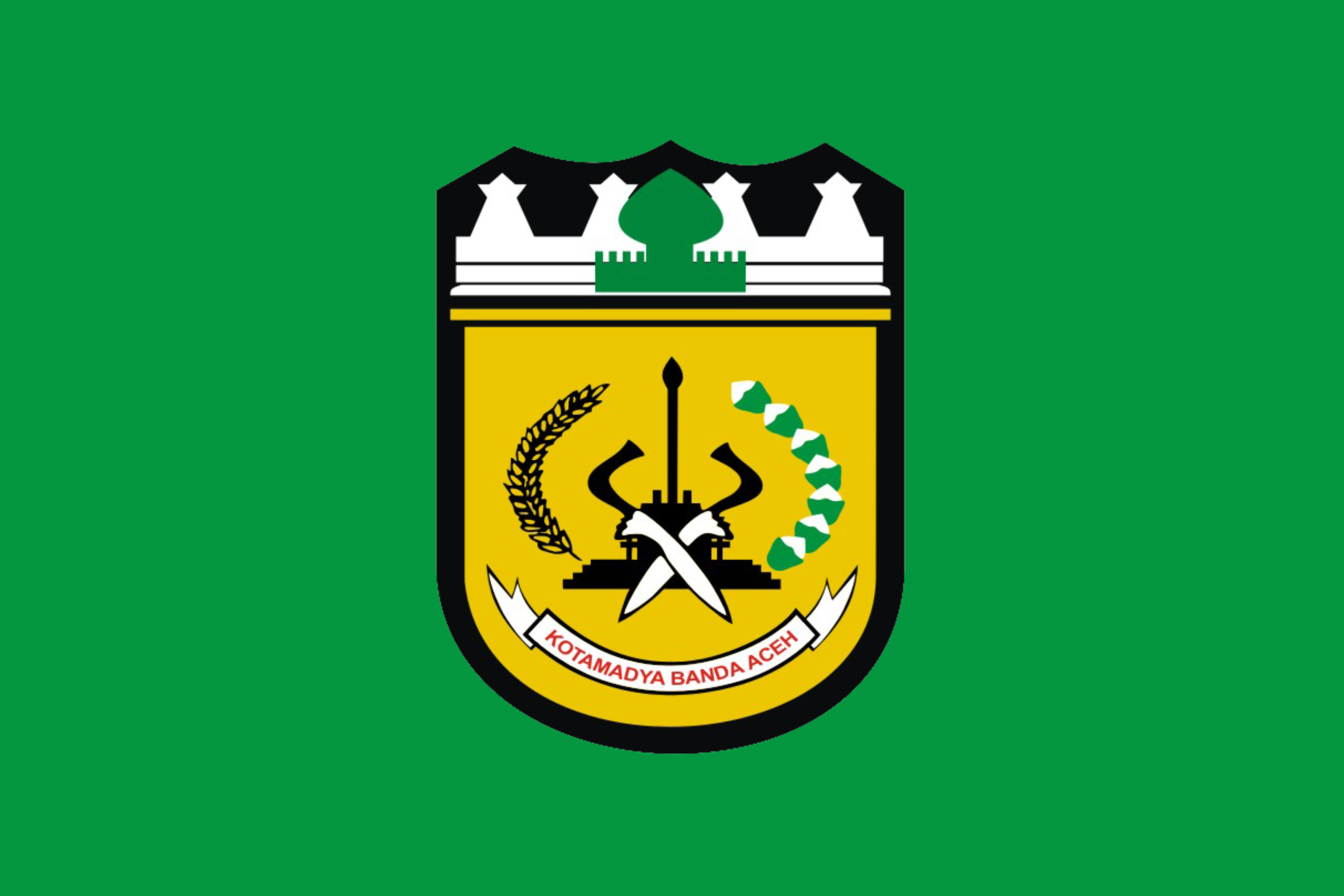
Banda Aceh City

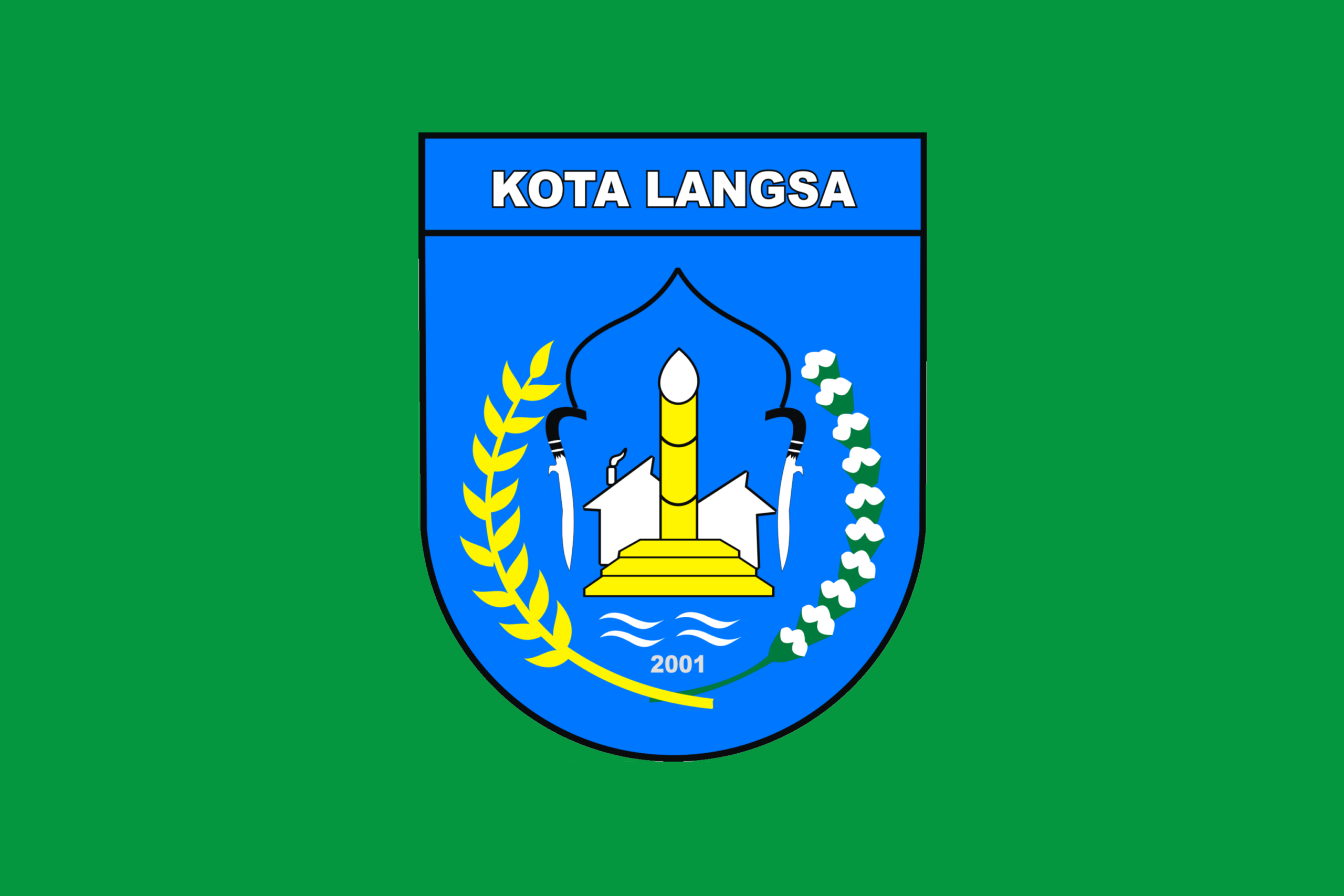
Langsa City

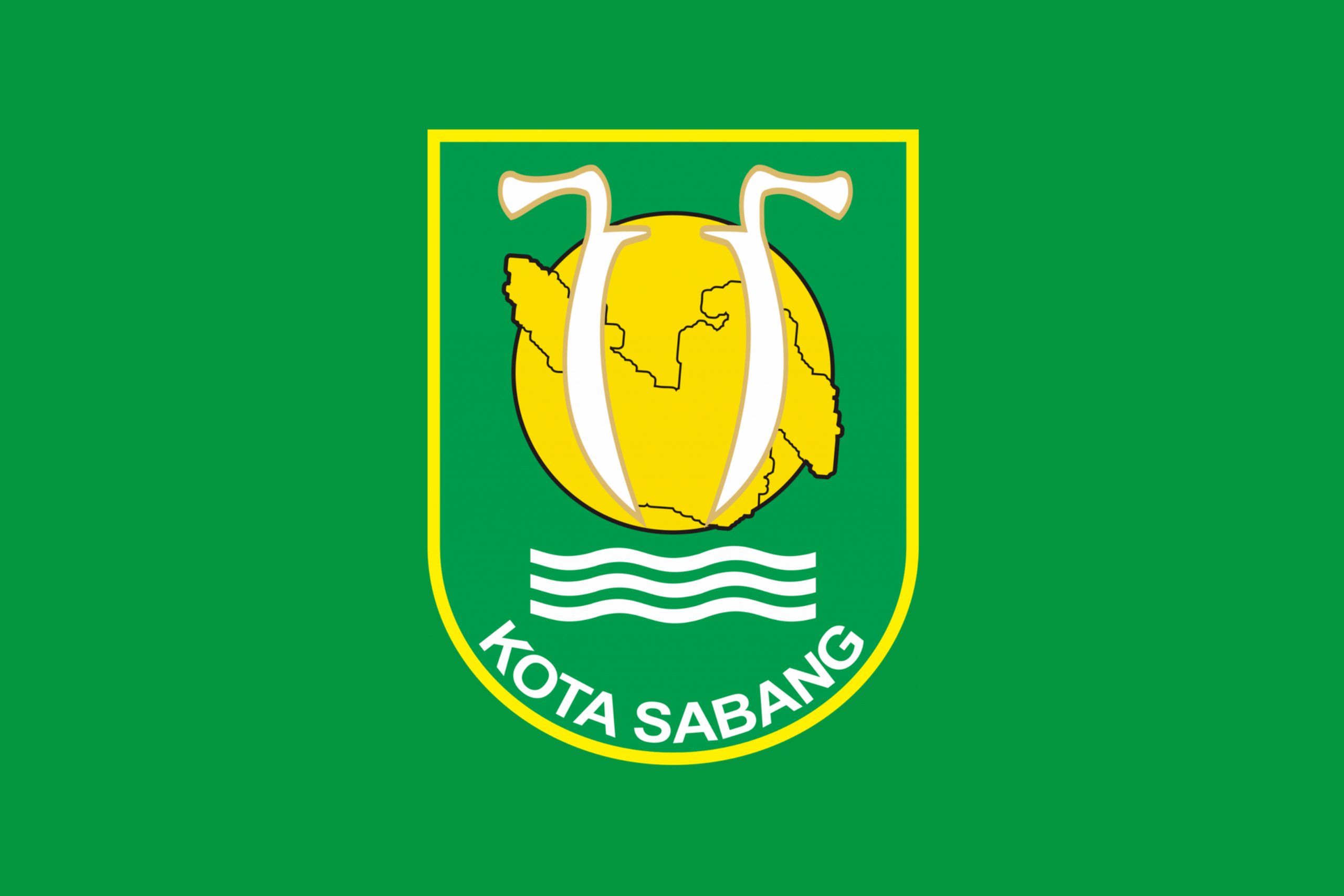
Sabang City

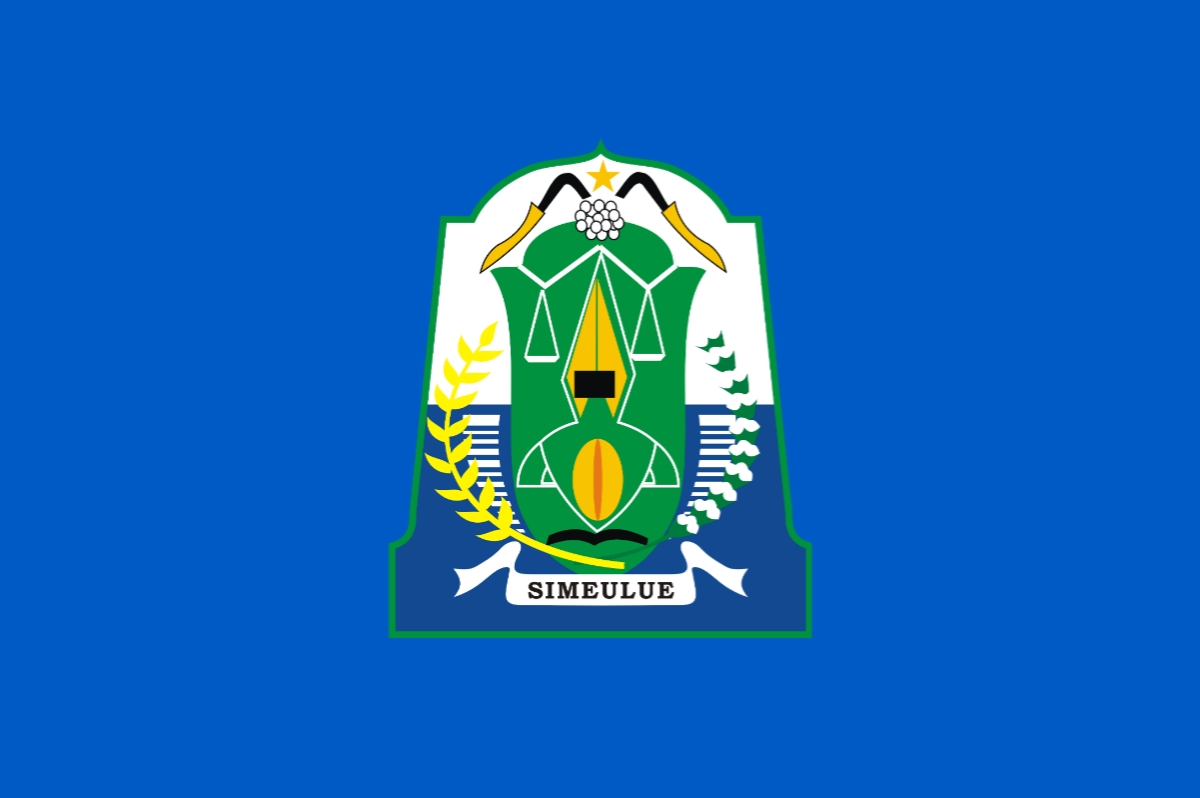
Simeulue Regency

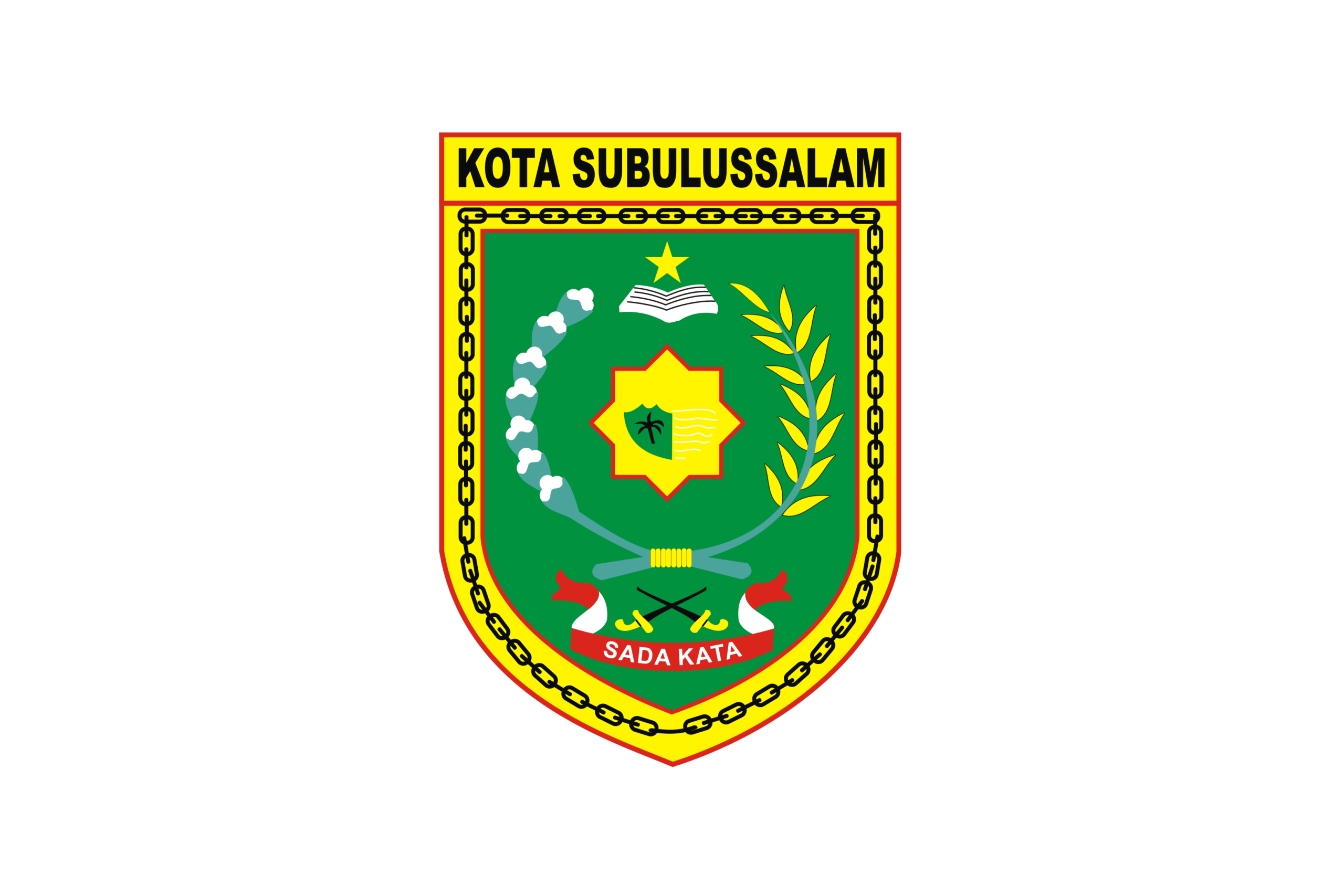
Subulussalam City

== Historical flags ==
Flag	State or Entity	Year	Description
	Sultanate of Aceh	15th c. – 1904	A red field with a crescent moon and a star above a sword, having its tip pointed to the right
	Sultanate of Aceh	15th c. – 1904	A red field with a crescent moon and a star with eight points
	Sultanate of Aceh	15th c. – 1904	A red field with a zulfiqar and a small circle above
	Sultanate of Aceh	15th c. – 1904	A red field with two crossed swords and a small circle above, with a small red pennant above the field
	Dutch East Indies	1904–1942	A horizontal triband of red, white, and blue
	Imperial Japan	1942–1945	A red disc centred on a white field
	United States of Indonesia	1949–1950	A horizontal bicolour of red and white
	Darul Islam	1953–1963	A horizontal bicolour of red and white, a white crescent moon and star on the red fess
	Darul Islam	1953–1963	A white crescent moon with four white stars arranged in a diamond shape on a green field
	Free Aceh Movement	1976–2005	A white star and crescent in the centre, between two horizontal unequal white-black-white bars on a red field
	Province of Aceh	2007–2013, 2016–present	A coat of arms on a green field
	Province of Aceh	2013–2016	A white star and crescent in the centre, between two horizontal unequal white-black-white bars on a red field

=== Other flags ===
Flag	Year	Description
	November 8, 1999	A white field with blue text on top, reading "REFERENDUM"; Flag flown in front of the Baiturrahman Grand Mosque during a mass call for referendum in Aceh.

== See also ==
- Coat of arms of Aceh
- Flag of Batak
- Marawa Minangkabau
- Morning Star flag
- List of Indonesian Flags

== Bibliography ==
- Zainuddin, H.M. (1961). Tarich Atjeh dan Nusantara [the History of Aceh and Nusantara] (in Indonesian). Medan: Pustaka Iskandar Muda.
