= Flags of the Aceh Sultanate =

Keurajeuen Acèh Darussalam

The Alam Peudeueng Mirah (Jawoe: علم ڤدڠ مره pronounced [alam pɯdɯ(ə̯)ŋ mirah]; lit. 'The Red Sword Standard') or Alam Peudeueng (Jawoe: علم ڤدڠ pronounced [alam pɯdɯ(ə̯)ŋ]; lit. 'The Sword Standard') consists of a white crescent and star and a sword below, pointed to the right, on a red field. The Alam Peudeuëng was used by the Aceh Sultanate as early as the 16th century, until its annexation into the Dutch East Indies after the Aceh War.

Nowadays, the Alam Peudeueng is often used to represent the Acehnese people as an alternative to the Moon Star flag used by the Free Aceh Movement, with the latter banner being outlawed as a symbol tied to separatism.

== Symbolism ==
The crescent and star symbolises Islam, which was taken from the flag of the Ottoman Empire, Aceh favoured the Ottoman Empire due to its assistance against Portuguese expansionism and later on being a key ally to the sultanate, even requesting protection under the Ottomans, The sword represents the sovereignty of Aceh, but also a symbol of the Acehnese's firmness, feared by their opponents.

== History ==
An illustration of the eight-starred crescent and star flag used by Aceh in 1865

Before the creation of Alam Peudeueng, the Aceh Sultanate used the Ottoman flag as its own, the flag that was often used by Aceh was the eight-starred variant. Aceh then designed several flags of their own inspired by the Ottoman flag's crescent and star symbol, which later became a symbol of Aceh and its Islamic culture. Due to its influence across the archipelago, the crescent and star symbol was later adopted by several other Islamic kingdoms in Southeast Asia, especially in Indonesia and Malaysia.

Alam Peudeueng had many variations throughout its history of usage due to the lack of standardisation of the construction and form of the flag. Many variations of the flag often don't include the crescent and star in its flag, and the type of sword differs. Common elements used in the flag and its variants are swords (saber or Zulfiqar, a double-edged sword), crescent and star, the sun, the moon, or stars represented in small circles. Arabic writings can also be seen written on the flags, especially war flags, as they contain prayers of safety and back luck to their enemies, akin to an amulet.

The modern depiction of Alam Peudeueng was first illustrated in 1961 with a poem alongside it:

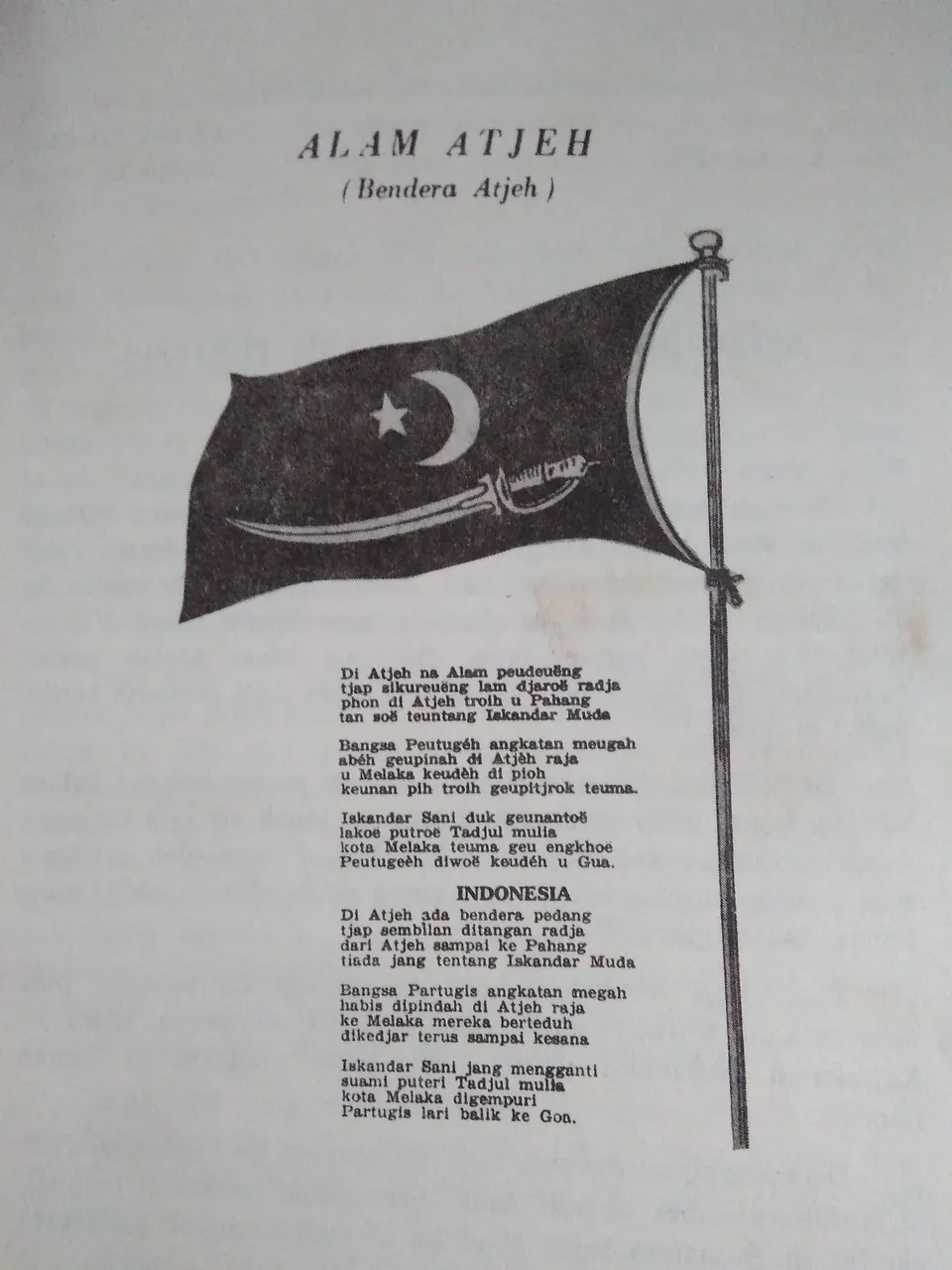
A page from "Tarikh Aceh dan Nusantara", showing the Alam Atjeh poem with a rendition of the Alam Peudeueng flag

Alam Atjeh (Original Spelling) Di Atjeh na Alam peudeueng Tjap sikureueng lam djaroe radja Phon di Atjeh troih u Pahang Tan soe teuntang Iskandar Muda Bangsa Peutugèh angkatan meugah Abèh geupinah di Atjeh raja U Melaka keudèh di pioh Keunan pih troih geupitjrok teuma Iskandar Sani duk geugantoe Lakoe putroe Tadjul mulia, Kota Melaka teuma geu engkhoe Peutugèh diwoe keudèh u Gua	English Translation In Aceh, there's the sword standard With the seal of nine at the king's hand Starting from Aceh all the way to Pahang No one dares to question Iskandar Muda The Portuguese with their mighty forces Cleared away from Greater Aceh They then stopped to rest in Malacca In there too they were quelled Iskandar Sani sat in succession The husband of princess Tajul Mulia The city of Malacca he then razed And so the Portuguese fled to Goa

== Modern usage ==
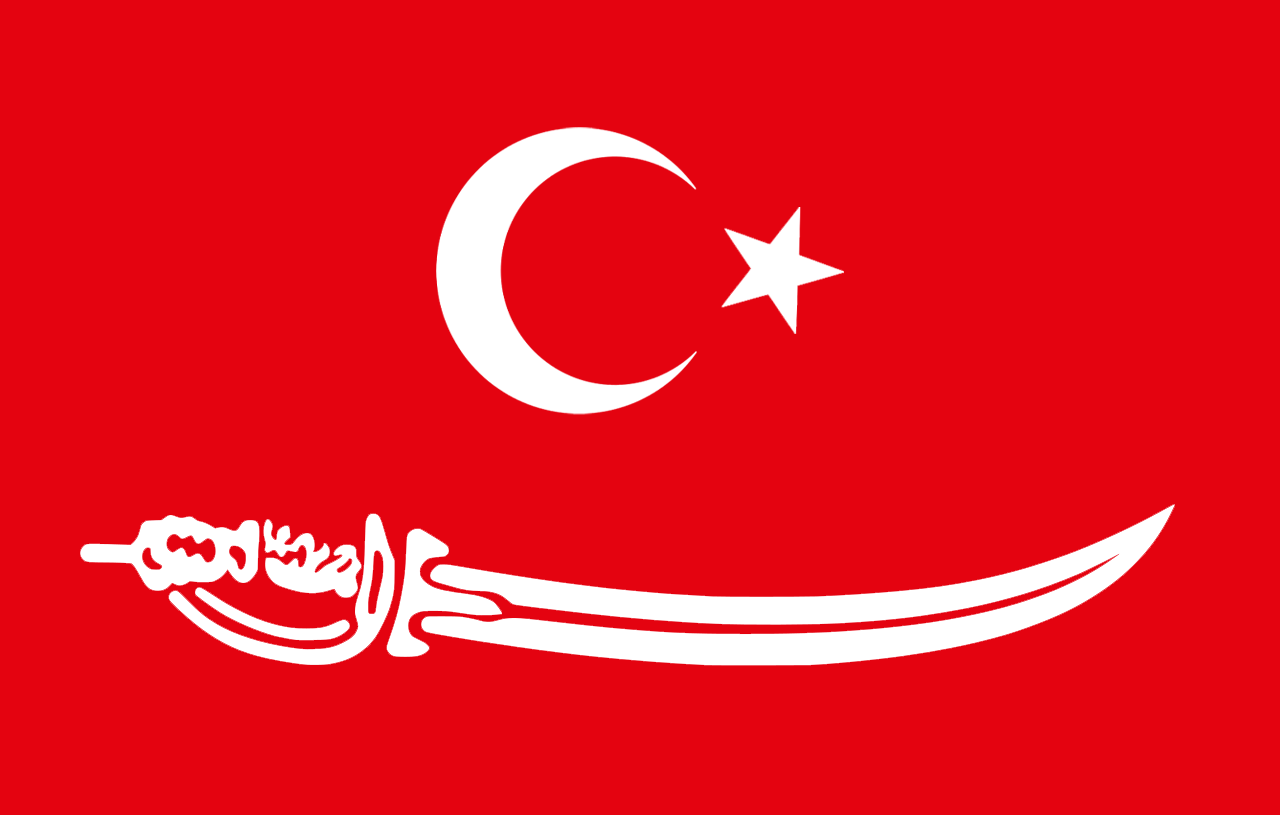
A modern variant of the Alam Peudeueng (2024)

The Alam Peudeueng with its green variant seen flying on the Pante Pirak bridge.

Parts of Acehnese society show support of using Alam Peudeueng as the official flag of Aceh, as they deem it to better represent Acehnese culture, history, and consider it as the original symbol of Aceh and its people.

On 1 September 2019, a community who claims to be the extended family of the mandate bearers of the Aceh Sultanate held a flag raising ceremony of the Indonesian flag and the Alam Peudeueng to celebrate the Islamic New Year of 1441 in the Darul Ihsan palace, located in Blang Oi Village, Banda Aceh, alongside an edict by Tuanku Muhammad ZN, saying that the Alam Peudeueng is not just a flag, but a symbol of the struggle to spread Islamic dawah in Aceh and the Malay world, as well as to restore the spirit of unification and harmony amongst the people of Aceh. Afterwards, the flag raising ceremony became an occasional tradition on Islamic New Years. During an Islamic New Year celebration in 2024, a flag raising ceremony of the Alam Peudeueng was held in Pidie. Led by Teungku Saiful, the flag ceremony was held as an invitation for all Muslims to bring peace and cease conflict with each other.

In 2023, an Islamic preacher and representative of Aceh in the Regional Representative Council in 2019, Muhammad Fadhil Rahmi, wore a songkok with the Alam Peudeueng embroided onto the sides, which sparked local public interest and requests for the Alam Peudeueng songkok. He also gifted one to Abdul Somad at his request, which he still wore occasionally to this day.

== Other flags ==
=== State and civil flags ===
Eight-starred flag (1865), commonly used as a state flag before the Alam Peudeueng

Zulfiqar and moon flag (Alam Zulfiqar), used as a civil ensign of the Aceh Sultanate (1865)

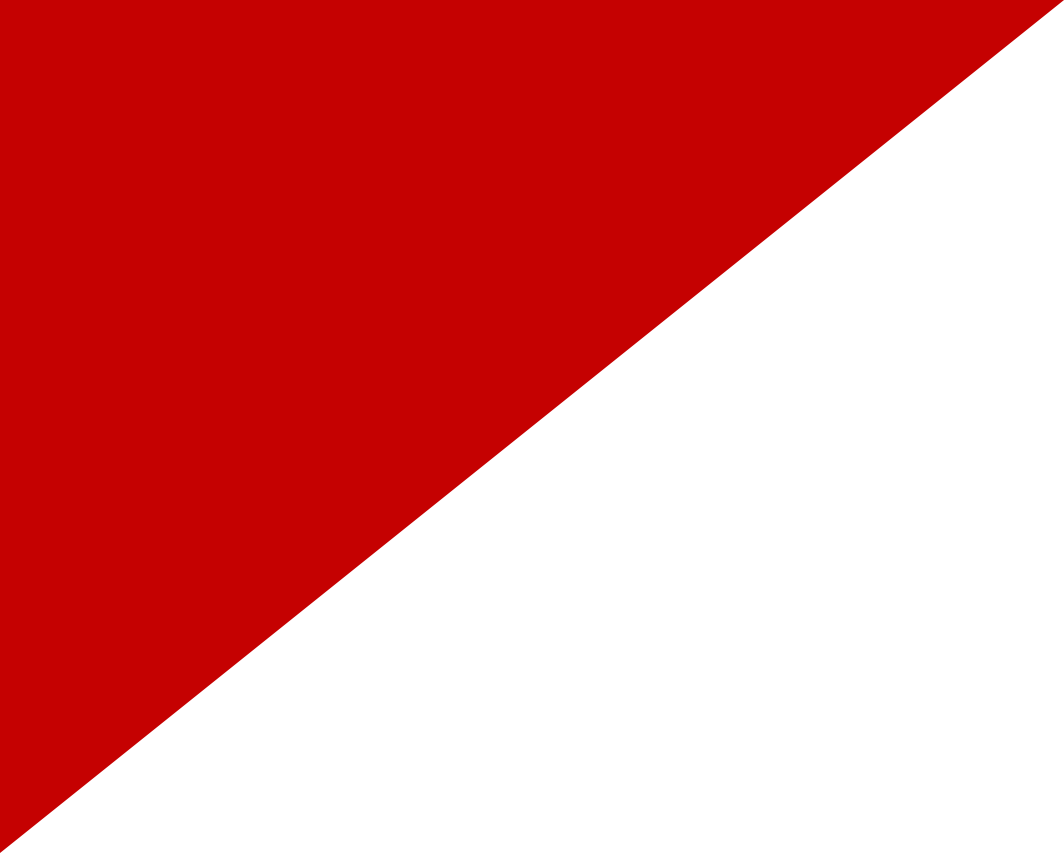
Alternative civil ensign of the Aceh Sultanate (1877)

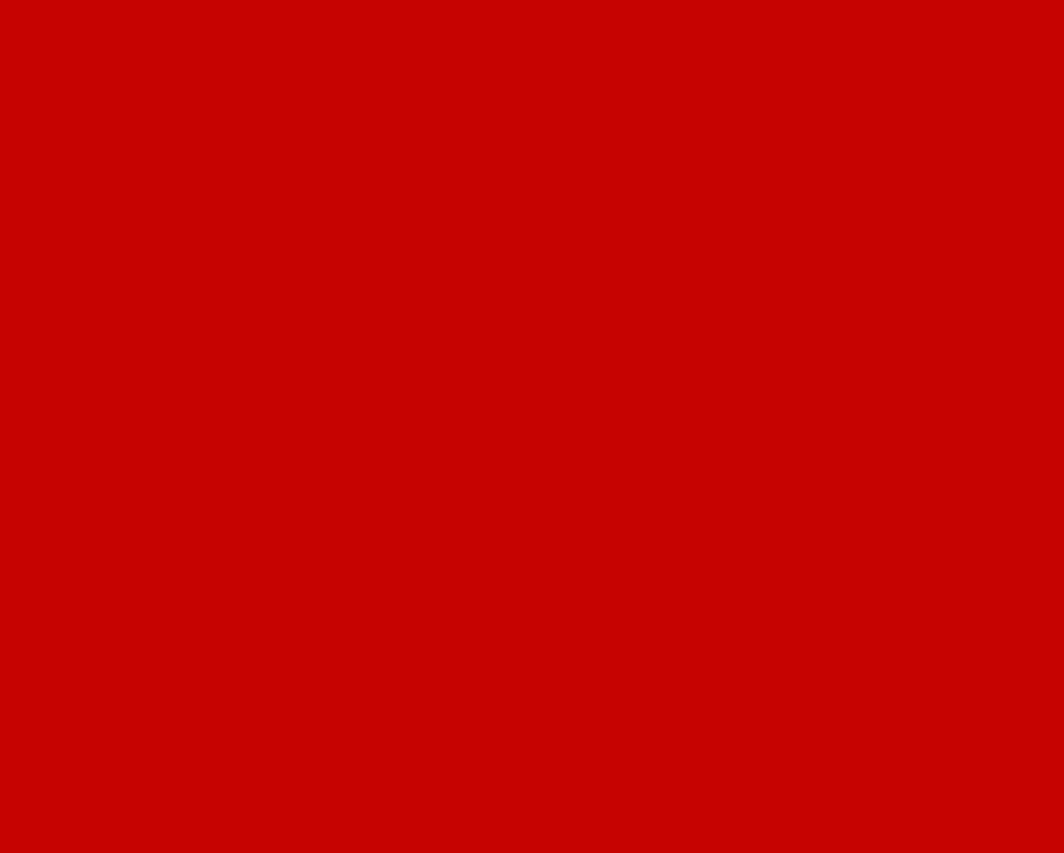
Alternative civil ensign of the Aceh Sultanate (1877)

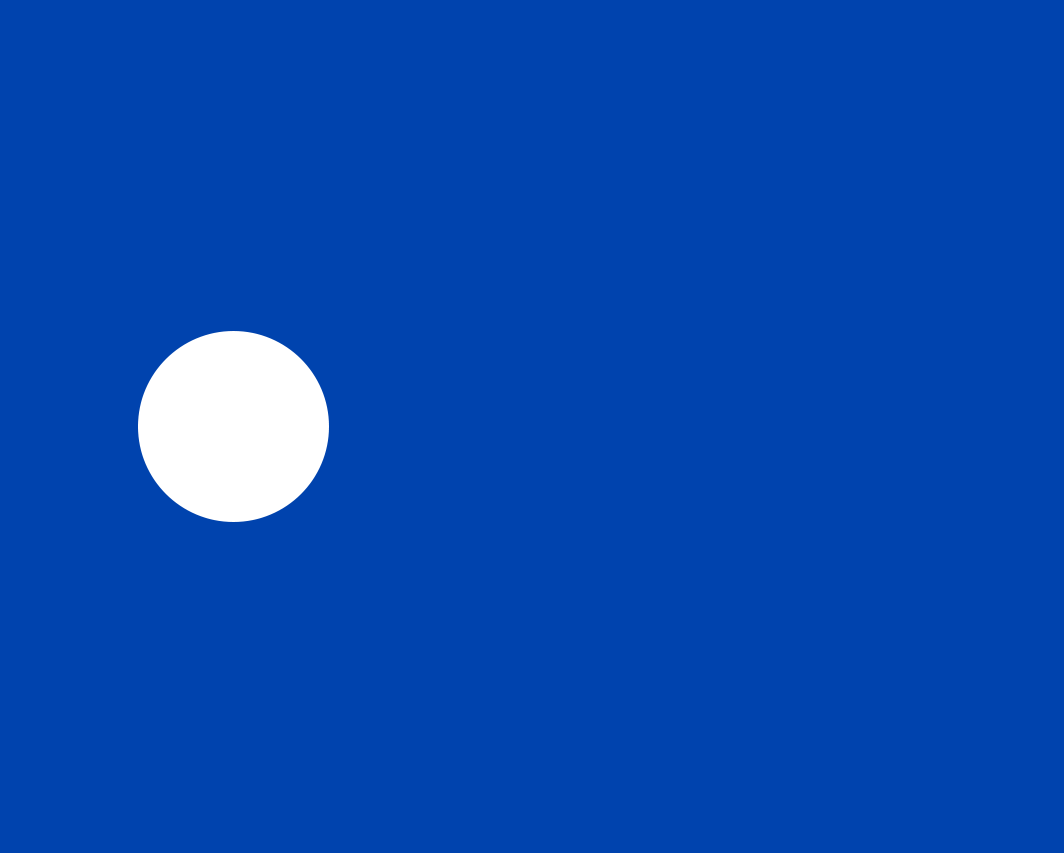
Alternative civil ensign of the Aceh Sultanate (1877)

Civil ensign of the Aceh Sultanate used by Arab merchants (1865)

=== War flags ===
Plain sword and moon flag (1840), used as a war flag, sometimes seen with Arabic calligraphy enscribed within

The Aceh Sultanate's war flag (1865)

Black variant of the Aceh Sultanate's war flag (1865)

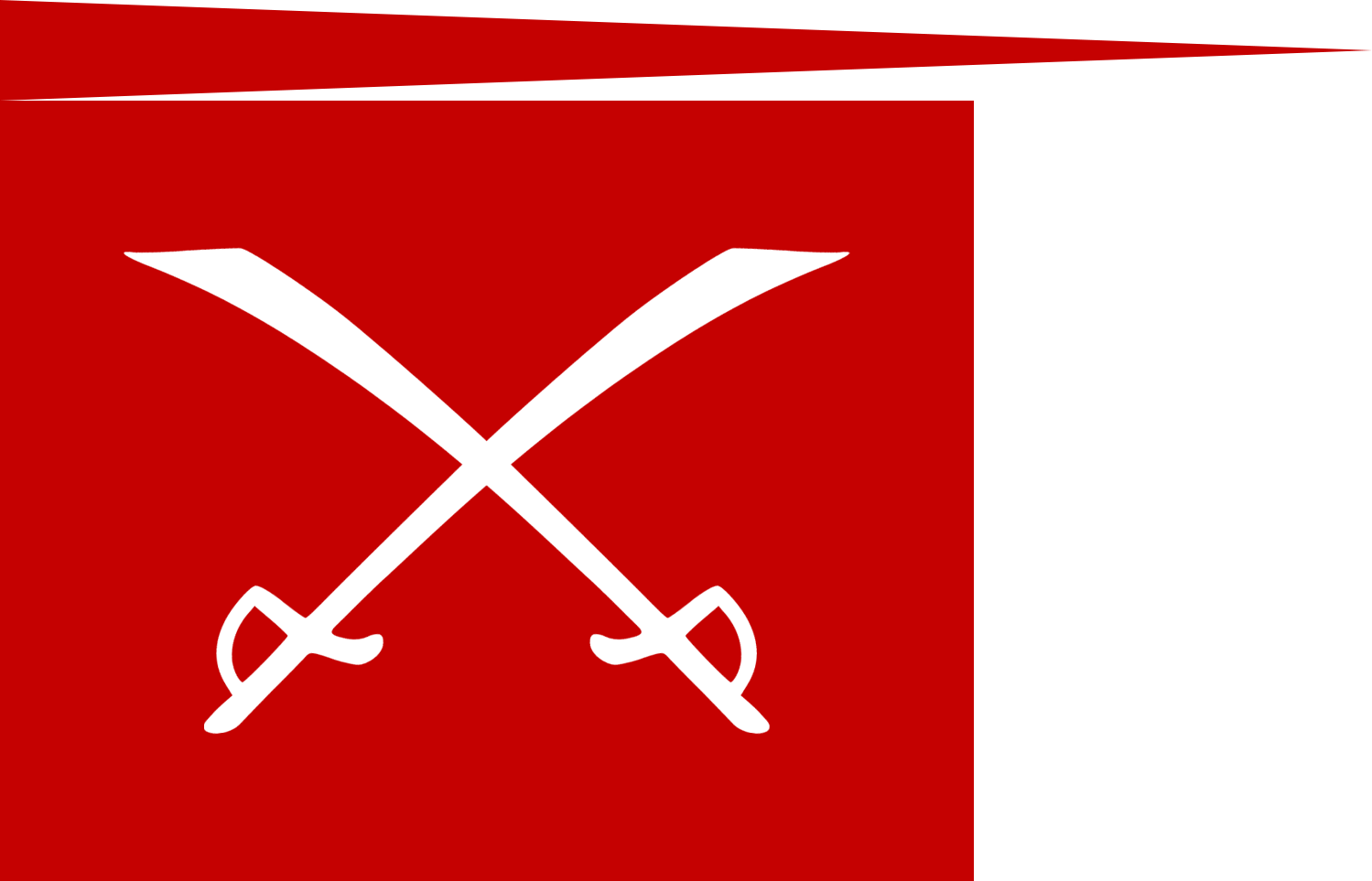
The Aceh Sultanate's war flag used in the Second Aceh Expedition

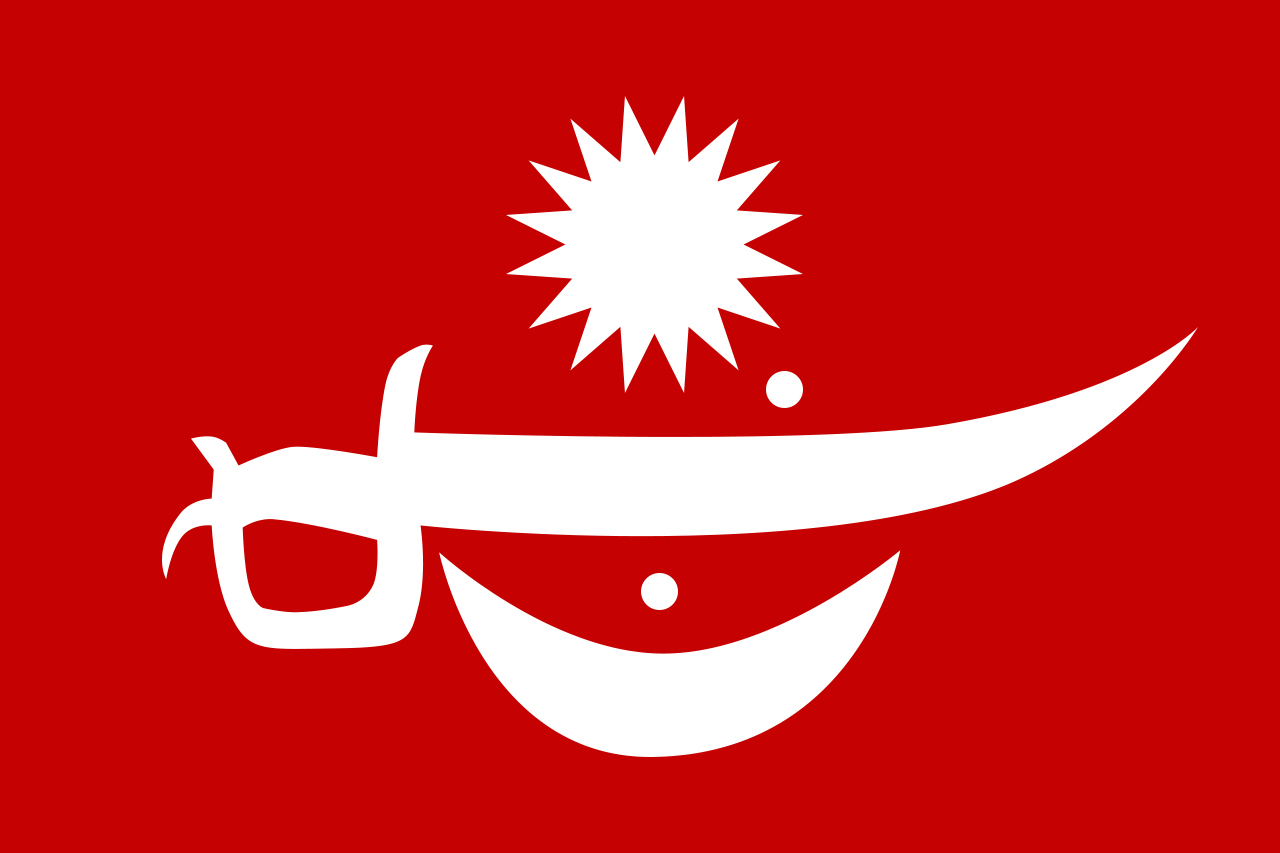
Sword flag with a sun, moon, and two stars (1901). used by Acehnese fighters at Batèe Iliek, Salamanga, Bireuen.

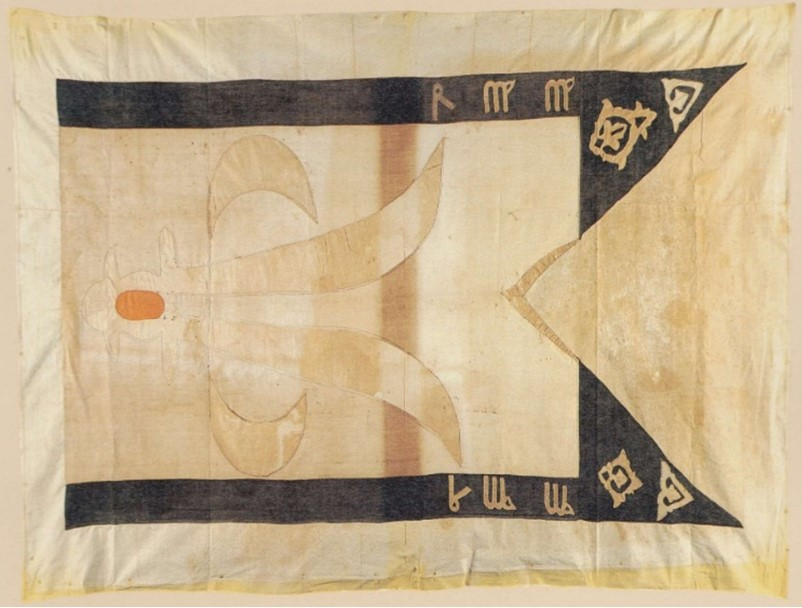
Swallow tail Zulfiqar flag (1902), used by Acehnese fighters in the Battle of Jambo Ayer

=== Naval ensign ===
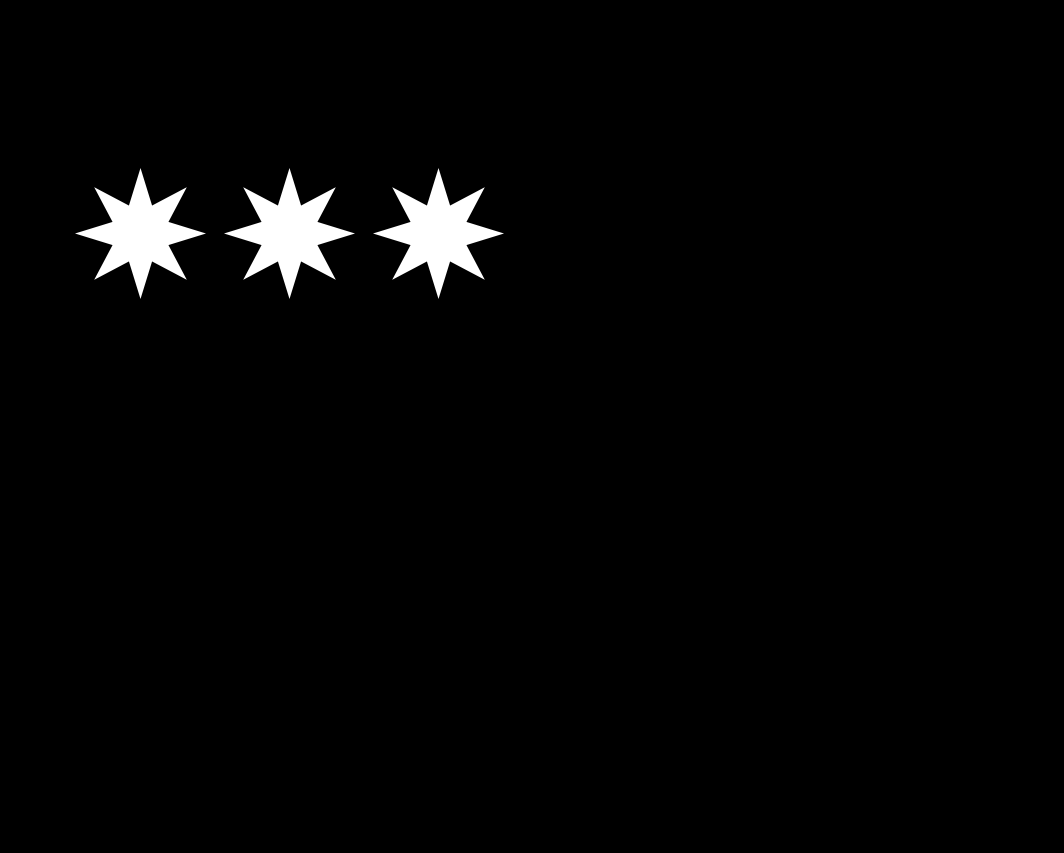
Naval Ensign of the Aceh Sultanate (1877)

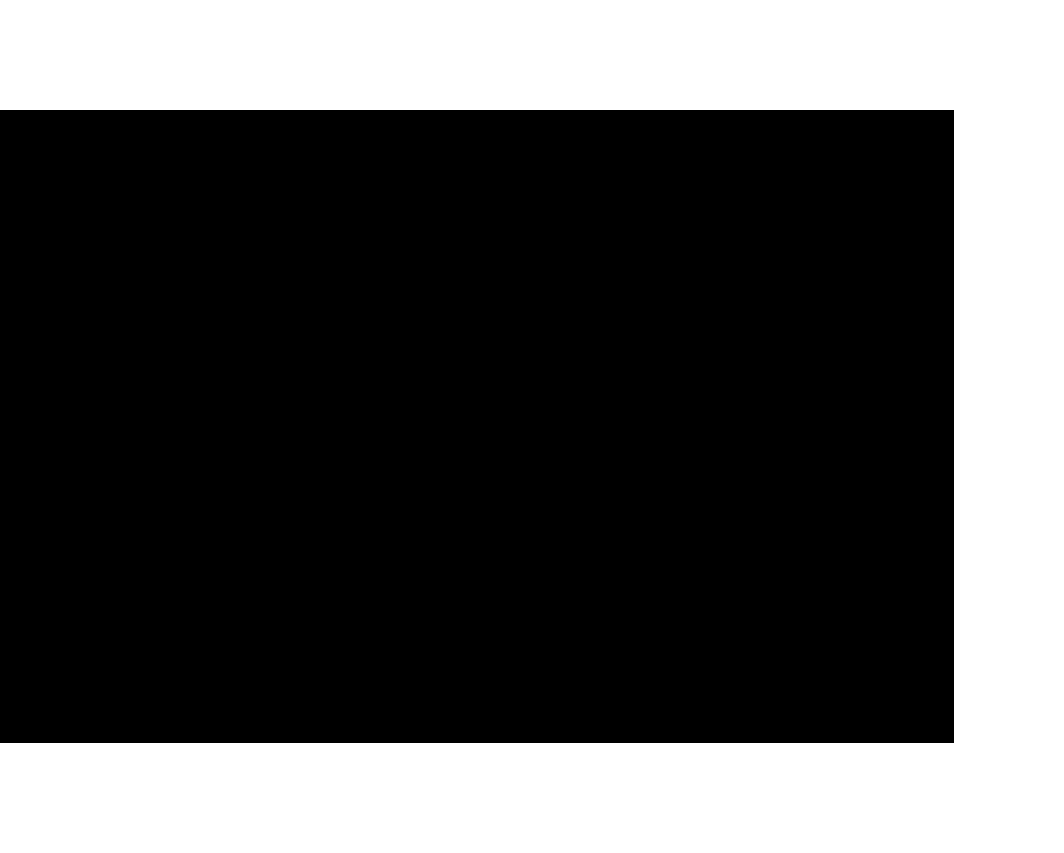
Naval Ensign of the Aceh Sultanate (1877)

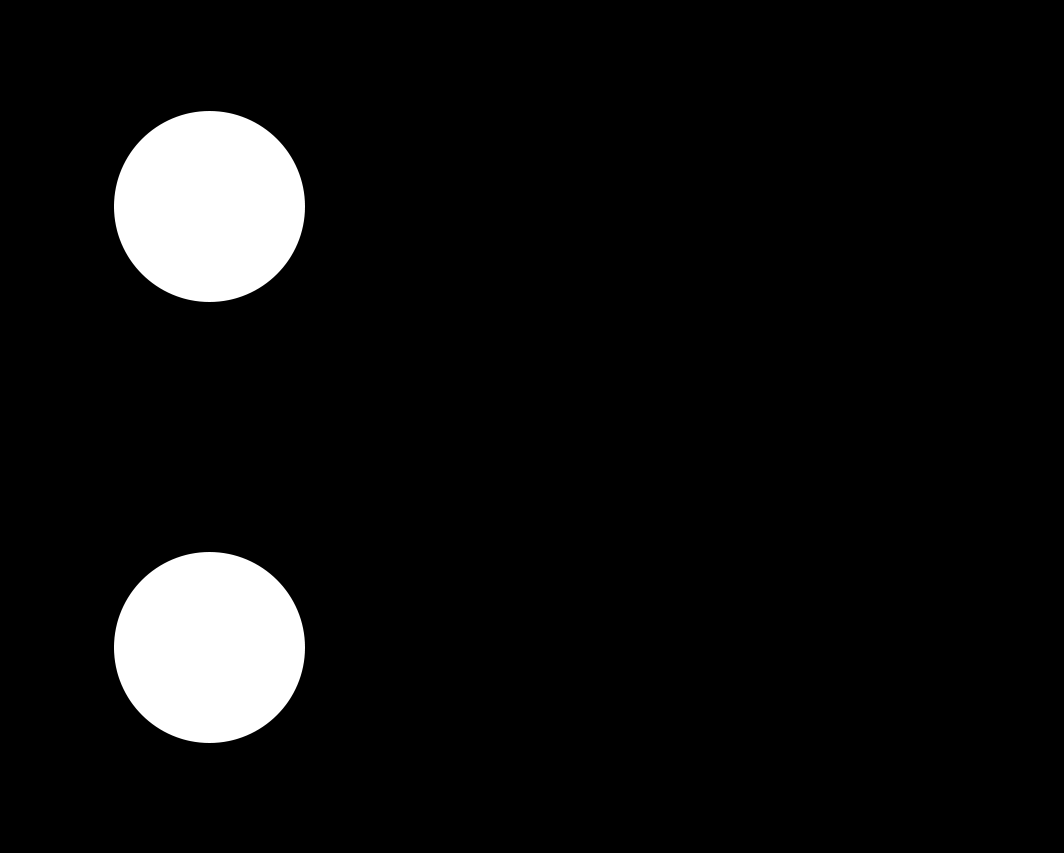
Naval Ensign of the Aceh Sultanate (1877)

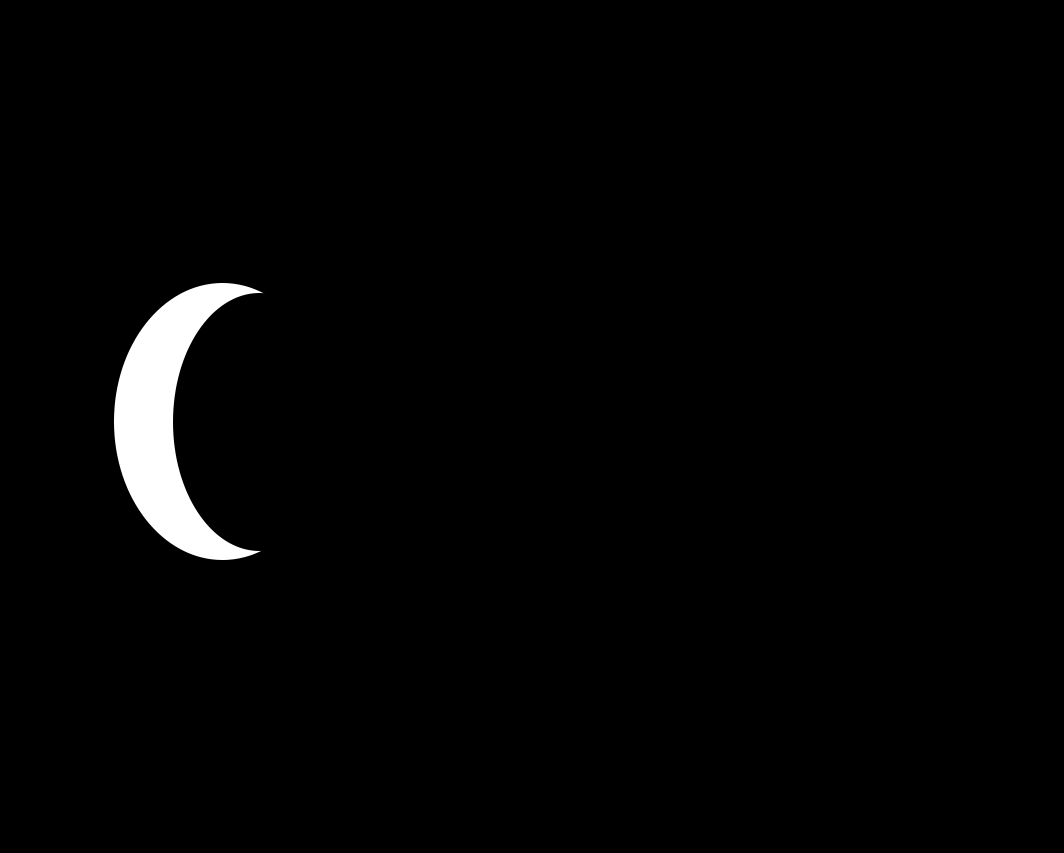
Naval Ensign of the Aceh Sultanate (1877)

=== Royal standards ===
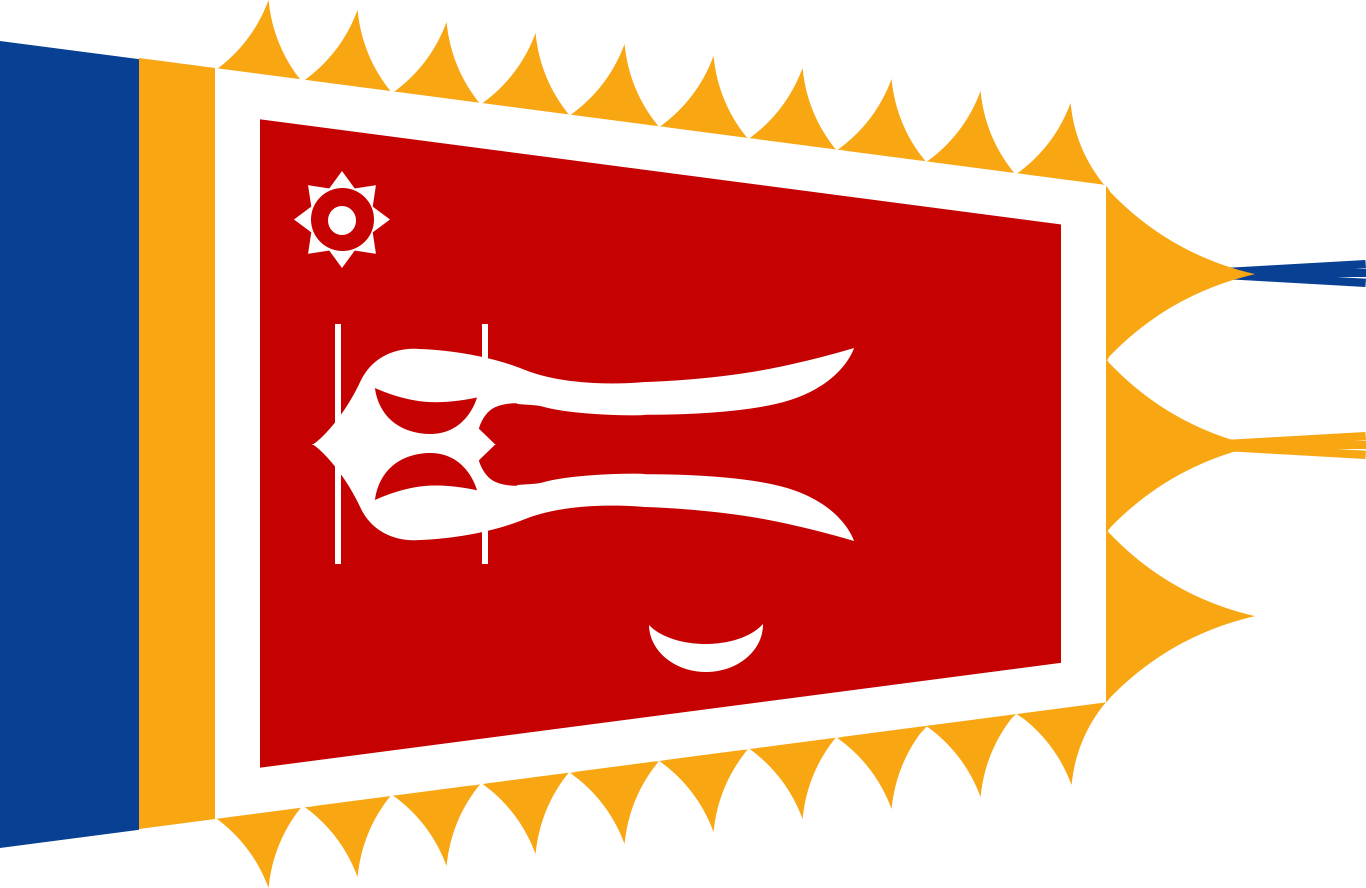
Flag of the Aceh Sultanate (1873–1874), possibly being a royal standard

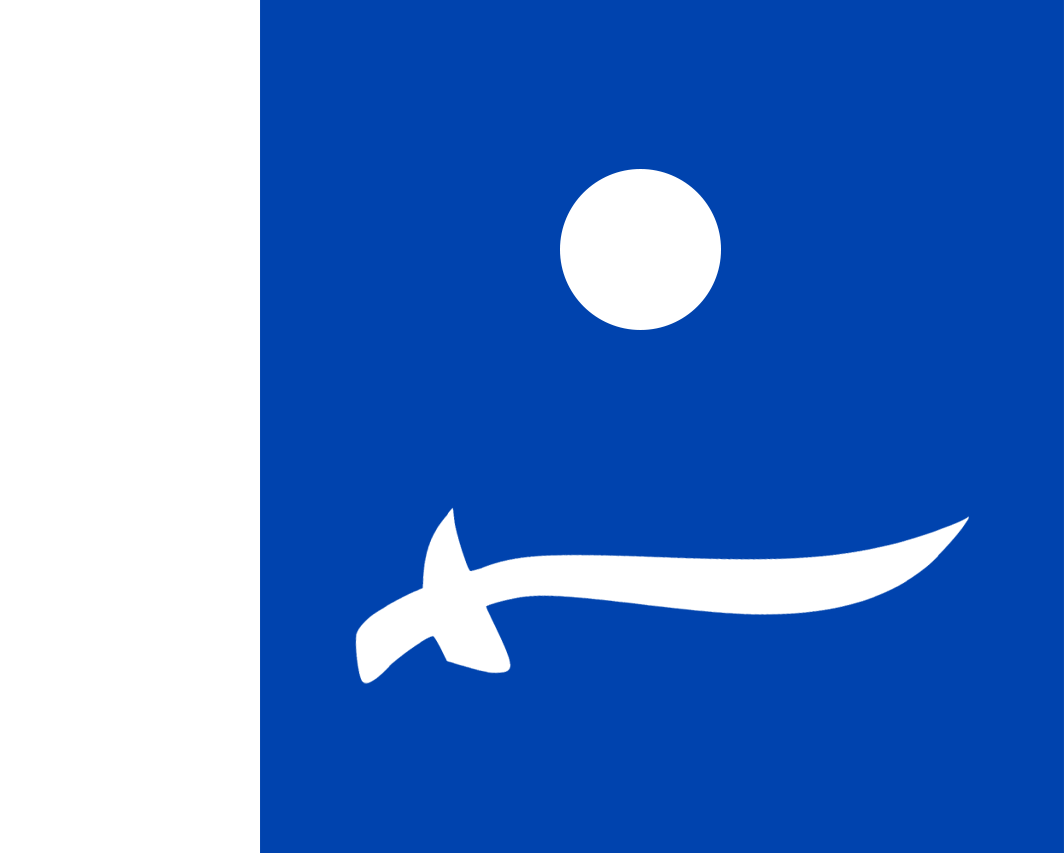
Royal Standard of the King of Trumon (1877)

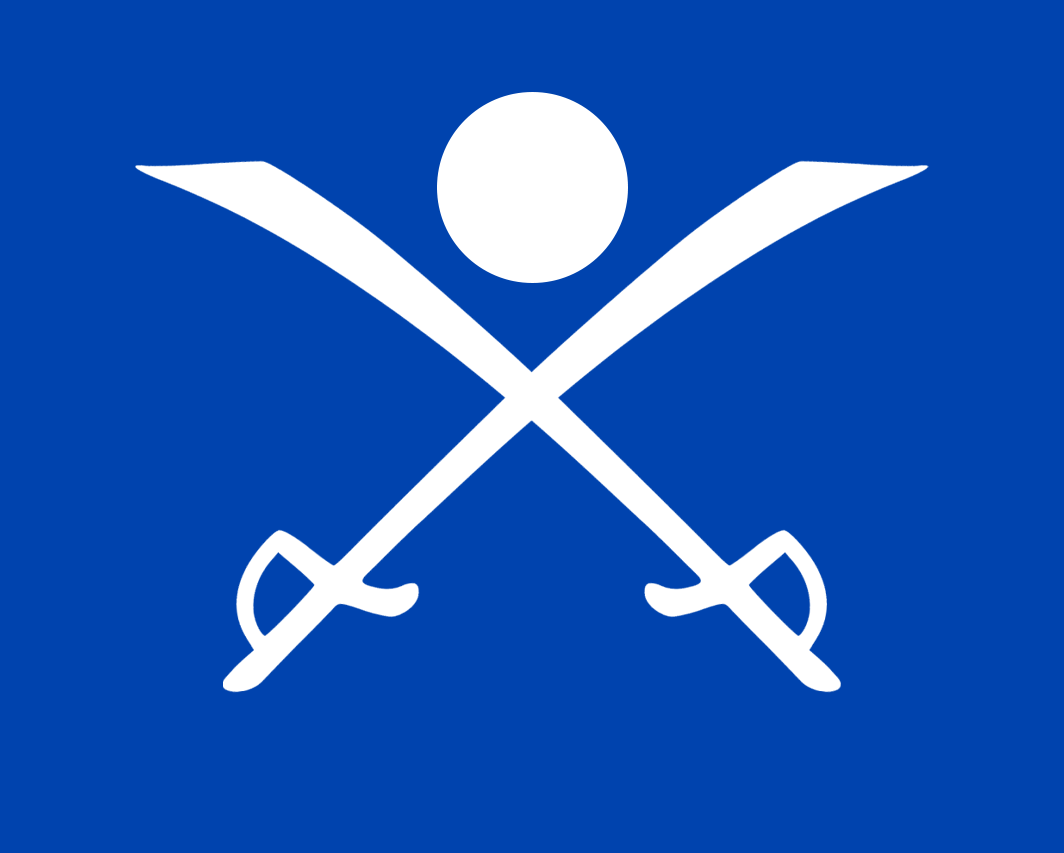
Royal Standard of the Prince of Aceh (1877)

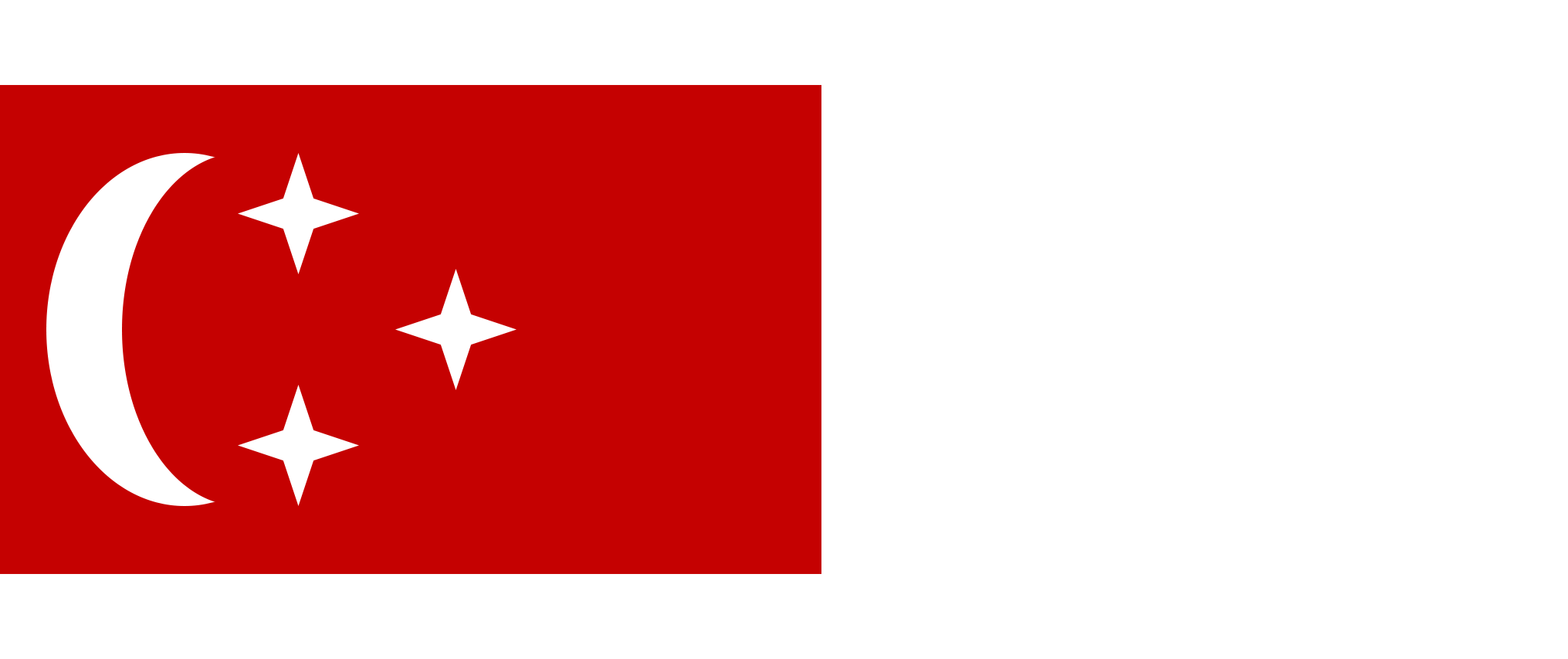
Royal Standard of the King of Samalanga (1877)

Variant of the Royal Standard of the King of Trumon (1865)

Variant of the Royal Standard of the Prince of Aceh (1865)

=== Other Aceh Sultanate flags ===
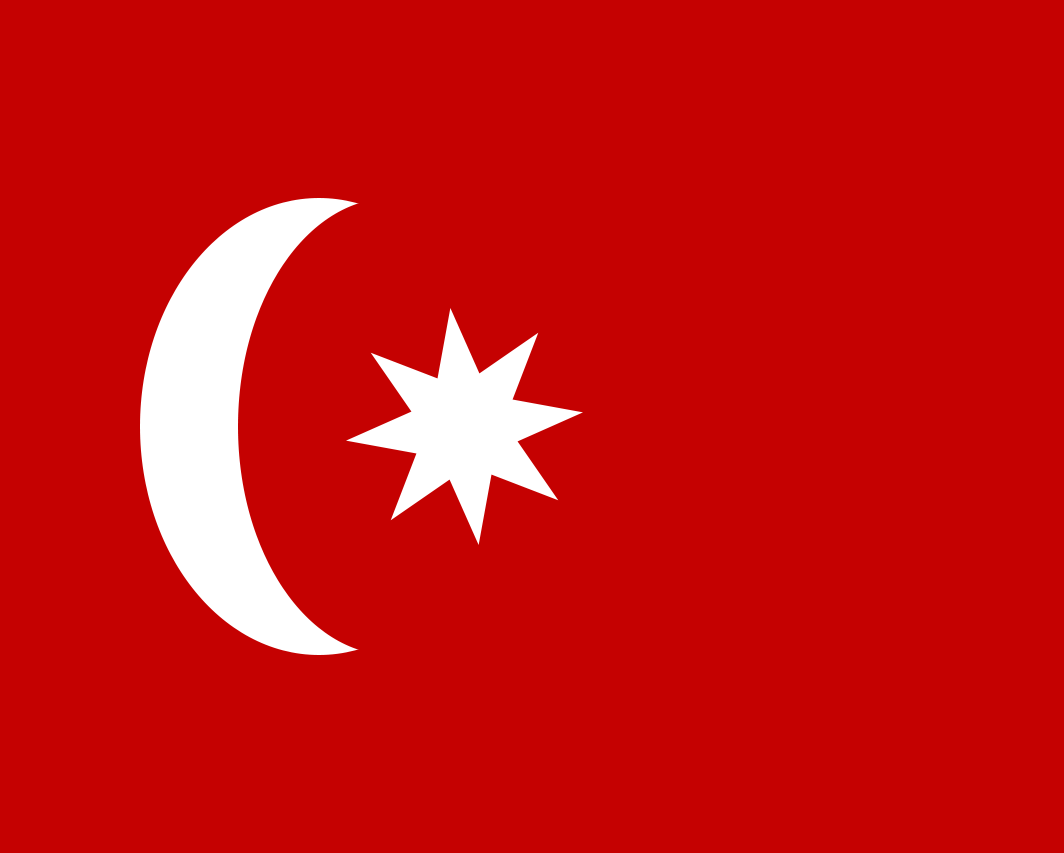
Variant of the eight-pointed star flag spotted in 1877, with a slightly tilted star

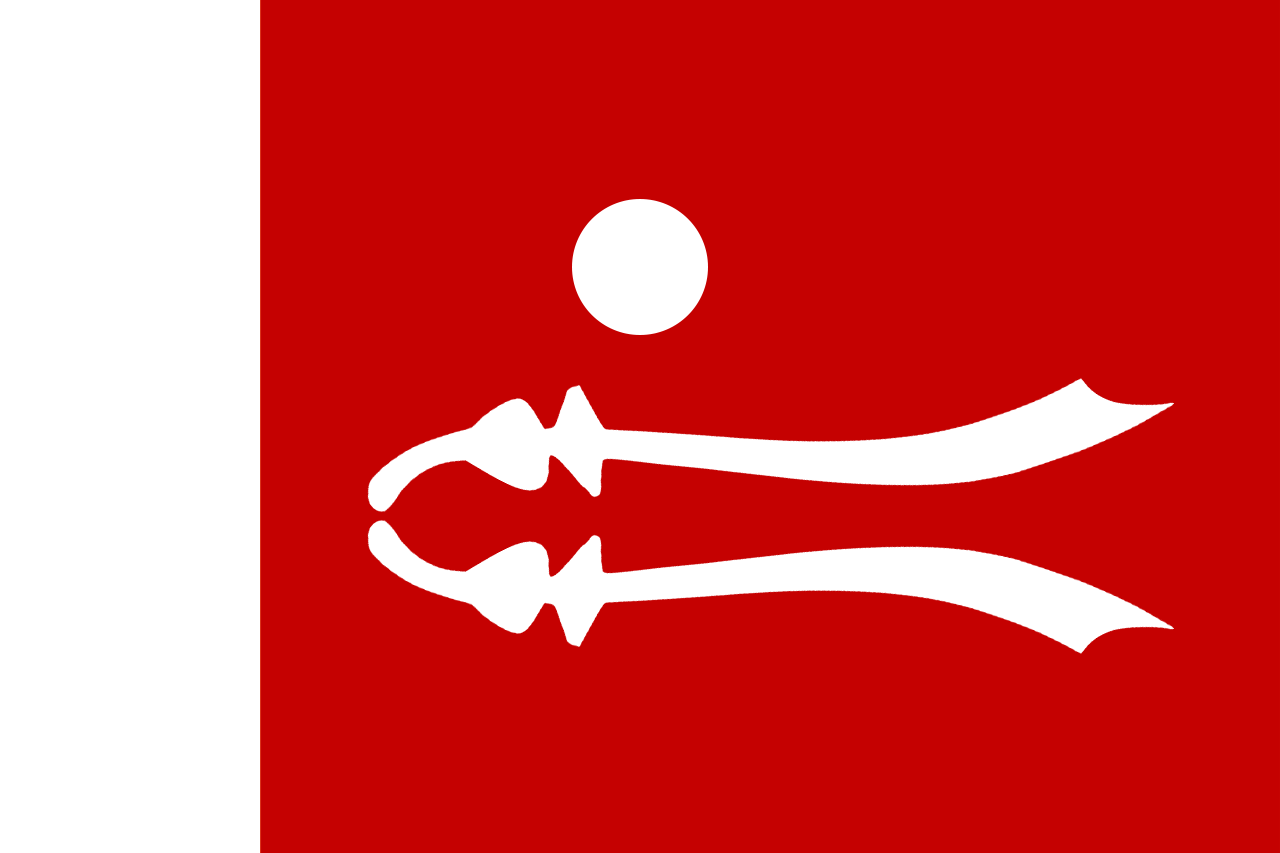
Variant of Alam Zulfiqar (1877)

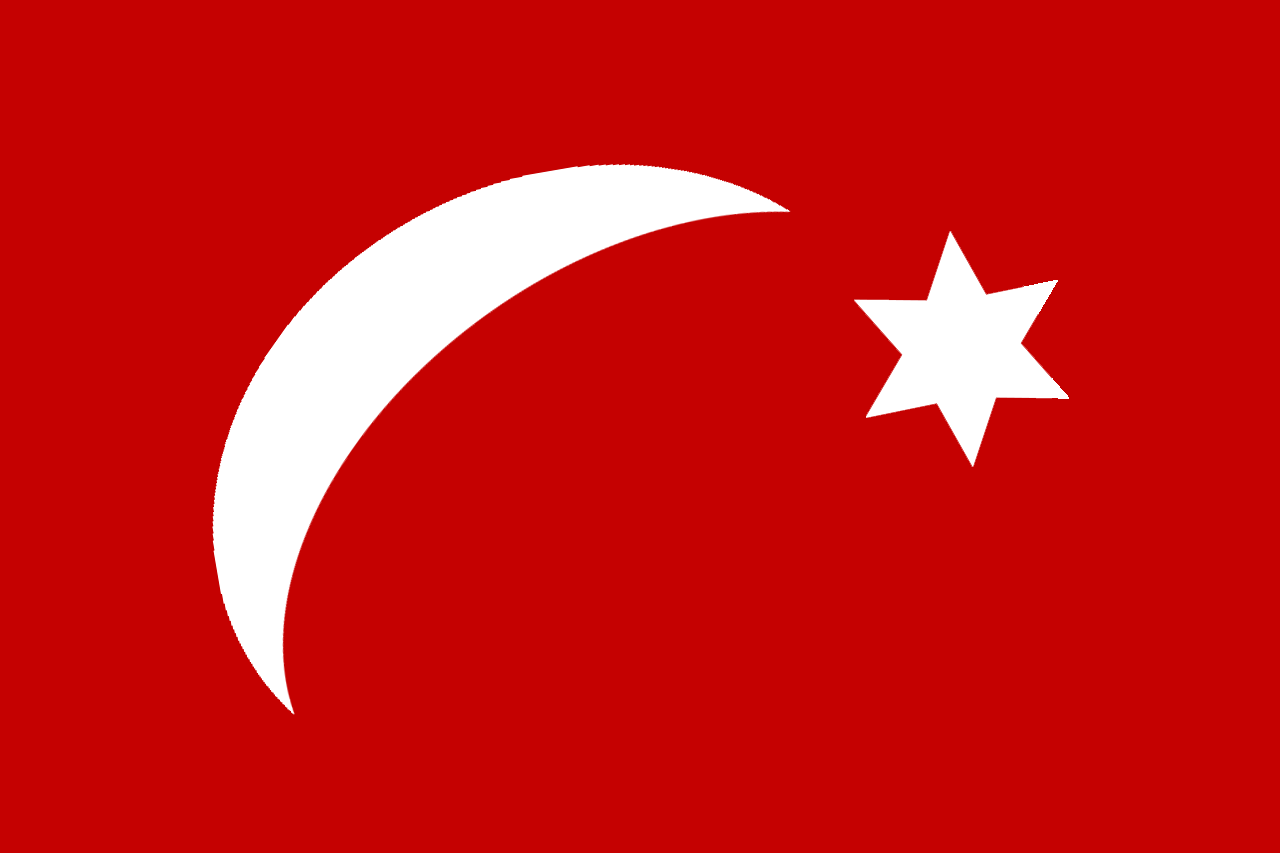
Six-pointed star flag (1877), in the original sketch, a text in Dutch reads "Seen in Great Aceh (the Beginning of the Aceh Expedition)"

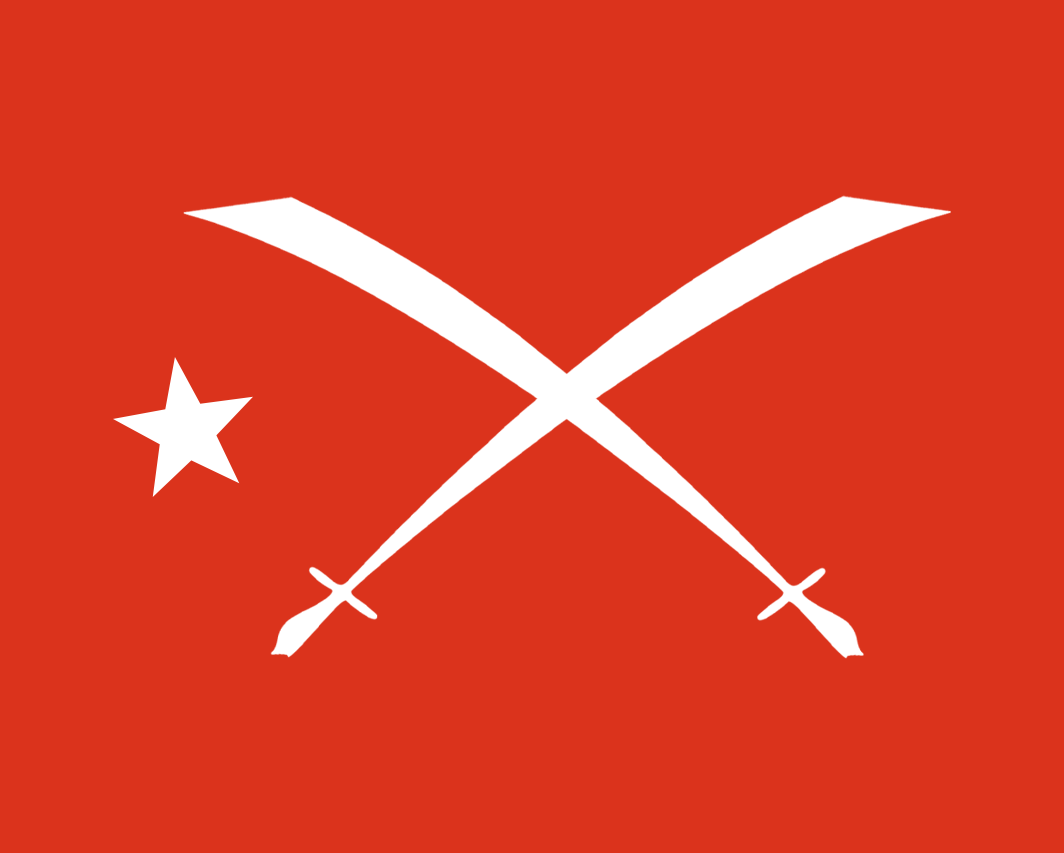
West Coast Flag (1877)

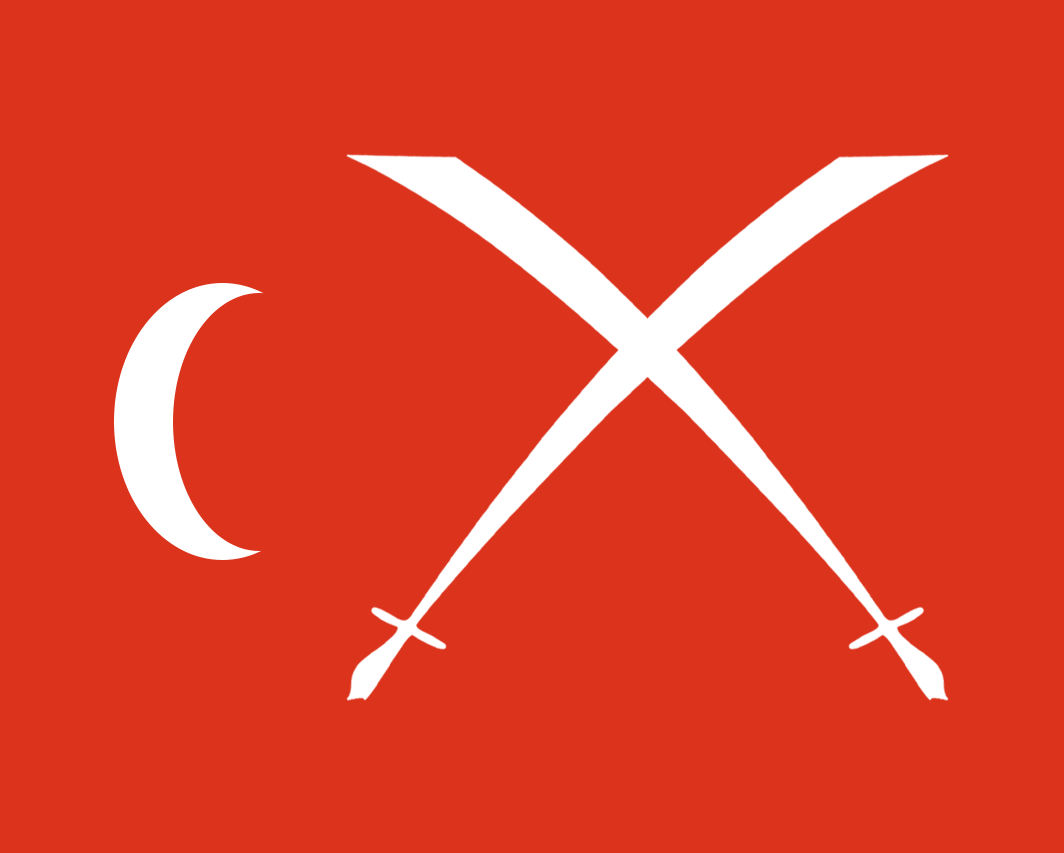
Kuala Gigieng Flag (1877)

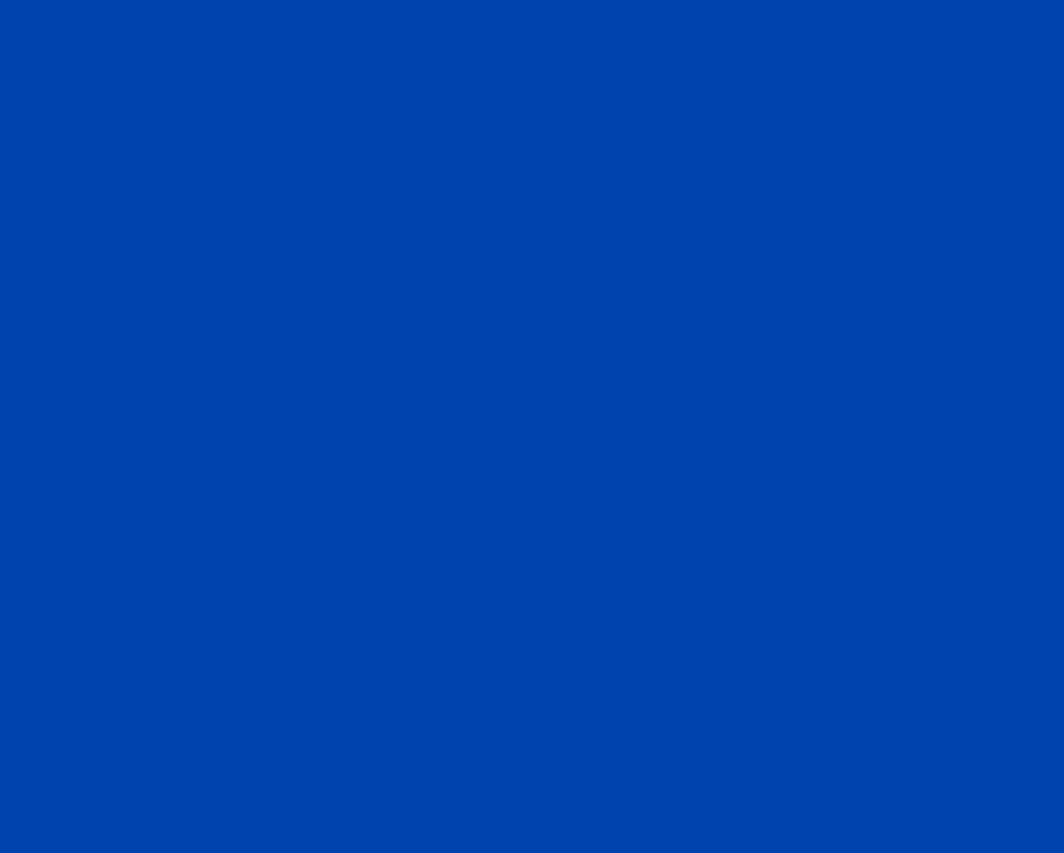
Kuala Batèe Flag (1877)

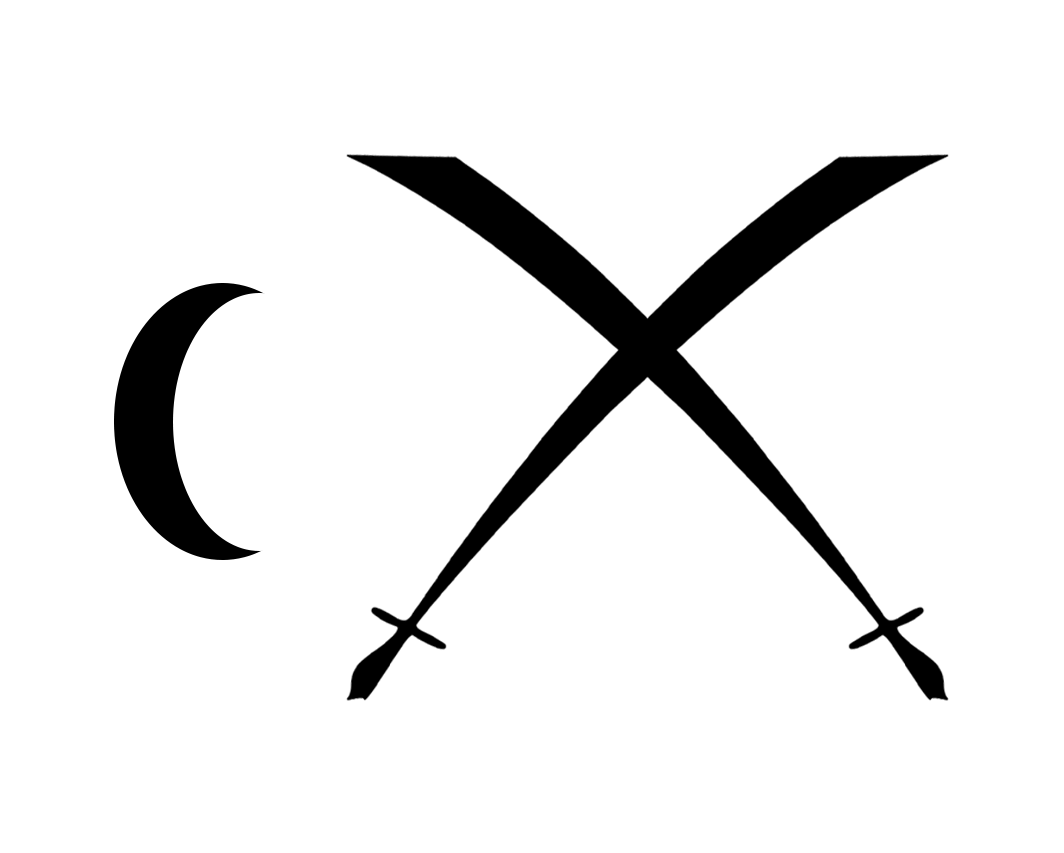
Kuala Nibong Flag (1877)

=== Derived and similar flags ===
The Bintang Buleuen flag of the Free Aceh Movement, which may have been inspired by the Alam Peudeueng

The flag of Sisingamangaraja XII, which was heavily inspired by the Alam Zulfiqar of Aceh

Flag used by the Karo people, possibly inspired by the Alam Peudeueng

== See also ==
- Flag of Batak
- Marawa Minangkabau
- Flag of King Sisingamangaraja
- List of Indonesian Flags

== Bibliography ==
- Zainuddin, H.M. (1961). Tarich Atjeh dan Nusantara [the History of Aceh and Nusantara] (in Indonesian). Medan: Pustaka Iskandar Muda.
- Finkel, Caroline (2005). Osman's Dream: The History of the Ottoman Empire 1300-1923. England: John Murray Publishers. ISBN 0-465-02396-7.
