= Coat of arms of Aceh =

- Armiger: Aceh
- Adopted: 1961
- Shield: Scale, rencong, rice, cotton, mosque done, chimney, book, and qalam
- Motto: Pancacita

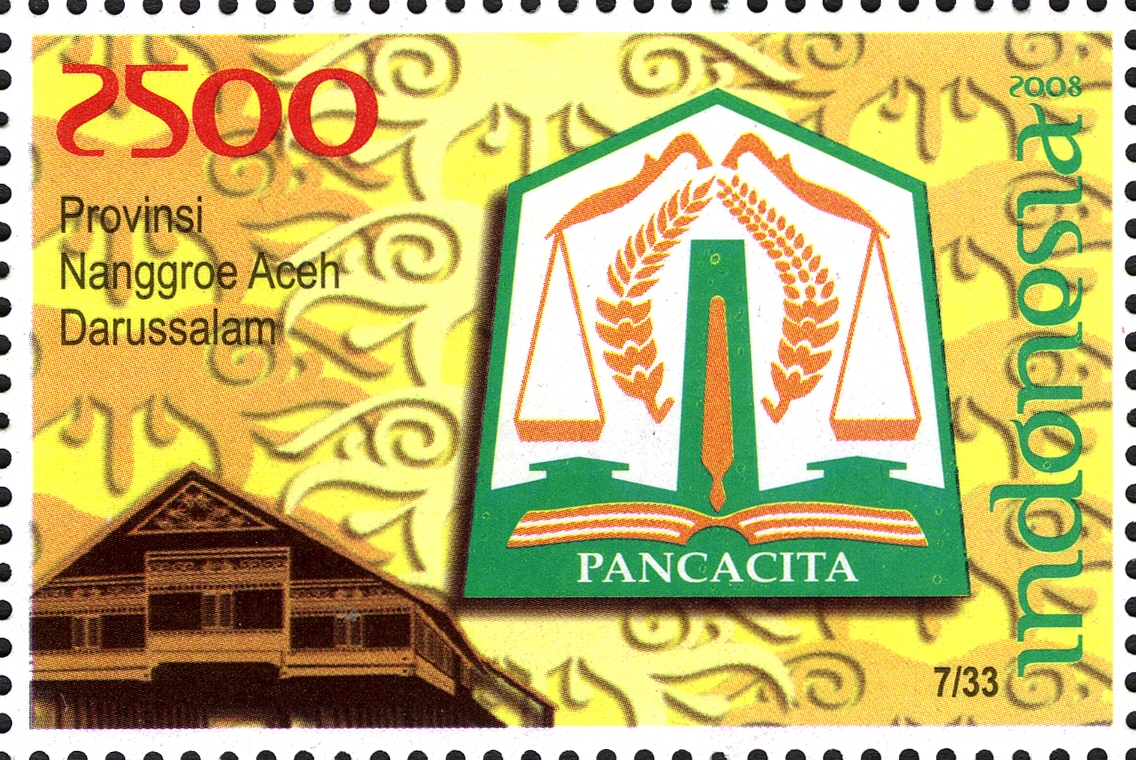
Stamps of Indonesia in 2008, showing the coat of arms of Aceh

The coat of arms of Aceh (Indonesian: Lambang Aceh, lit. 'The Symbol of Aceh'), also known as Pancacita, is the official insignia of the province of Aceh, an autonomous region of Indonesia.

== Design ==
The coat of arms features a pentagonal shield, resembling an Acehnese kupiah, with green (vert) bordure on a white (or) field, which features two renchongs, each holding a scale on its tip, with a stalk of rice and a sprig of cotton in the shape of a mosque's dome next to it. Below each scales features a factory chimney, which is shaped like an arrow pointing up. Between them features a qalam pen which points to a book. Below the book features the province's motto in Sanskrit, Pancacita.

=== Symbolism ===
The coat of arms features the province's motto Pancacita (lit. 'Five Ideals'), which stands for justice, heroism, prosperity, harmony, and welfare. Each of these symbolisms can also be found in the individual symbols featured in the shield:

- Scale representing justice
- Renchong representing heroism
- Rice, cotton, and factory chimneys representing welfare
- Mosque dome representing harmony
- Book and qalam representing welfare

Additionally, the mosque dome, book, and qalam may also represent piety and knowledge.

== History ==
In 1961, a contest was held and led by Ali Hasjmy, the then governor of Aceh, to design a coat of arms for the province, though he wasn't happy with the submissions, as a result, no winner was decided. On 17 May 1961, the task of designing the coat of arms based on the submissions was given to one of the juries of the contest, Chairul Bahri, a Gayo painter from Bintang, Aceh. He was chosen due to his art background and education in Rome.

The coat of arms was officially adopted through Regional Regulation 39/1961 concerning the emblem of the Special Region of Aceh, this regulation is nullified with the passing of Qanun 3/2013, though the coat of arms is still in official use as no suitable replacement has been made.

=== 2013 proposal ===
Proposed Coat of Arms of Aceh
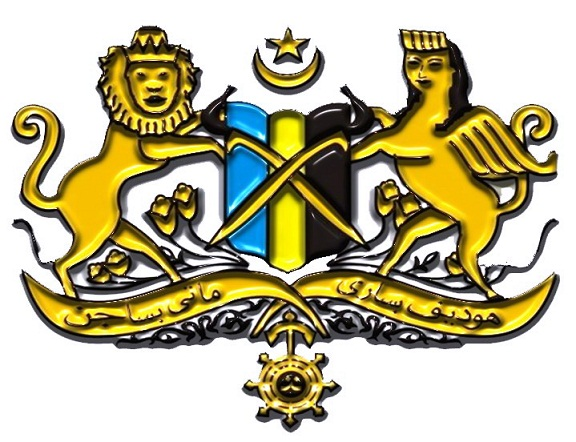
- Adopted: 1976 (by the Free Aceh Movement); March 25, 2013 (According to Qanun Aceh No. 3, 2013)
- Relinquished: May 12, 2016
- Shield: tricolour shield with renchong
- Supporters: lion, buraq
- Motto: Hudép Beusaré, Maté Beusajan
- Order(s): anchor, ship's wheel, Arabic letter ta'

On March 25, 2013, the government of Aceh, led by Zaini Abdullah, passed Qanun 3/2013, which establishes the symbols previously used by the Free Aceh Movement as the new flag and coat of arms of Aceh, though efforts were made to disassociate the symbols with the separatist movement.

The coat of arms, referred as the Lion-Buraq emblem (Indonesian: Lambang Singa-Burak), features a tricolour shield of blue (azure), yellow (or), and black (sable), charged with two renchongs, with a star and crescent as the crest surmounting the shield, supported by a lion and a buraq, with flowers and the motto Hudép Beusaré, Maté Beusajan (هوديف بسرى ماتى بساجن pronounced [hudep bɯs̻̪are mat̠e bɯs̻̪aɟan]; Live Together, Die Together) written in Jawoe, below is an anchor positioned upside down, holding an order-like ship's wheel with the Arabic letter ta' situated in the middle.

On 3 April, 2013, the Ministry of Home Affairs (Kemendagri) gave the government of Aceh a 15 day grace period to reevaluate and revise the qanun regarding the new flag and coat of arms.

This coat of arms is relinquished on May 12 2016, where it was rejected through the Minister of Home Affairs Decree 188.34-4791 of 2016, as they deem the qanun to be in violation of Regulation of Government Number 77 of 2007.

=== 2016 proposal ===
On the same day the Ministry of Home Affairs urges the government of Aceh to revise the symbols, the Aceh People's Advocacy Foundation (Indonesian: Yayasan Advokasi Rakyat Aceh; YARA) suggested a revision of the Qanun, the coat of arms suggested features a dove, scale, pinto, the Quran, renchong, rice, cotton, and a banner that reads "Nanggroe Aceh Darussalam", which was the official name of Aceh from 2001 until 2009.

After the rejection of Qanun 3/2013 in 2016, YARA suggested their previous proposal again as a judicial review to the Supreme Court of Indonesia as replacement, but was rejected by the Supreme Court on February 14, 2017.

== See also ==
- Flags of Aceh
- Armorial of Indonesia
