= Peurawot =

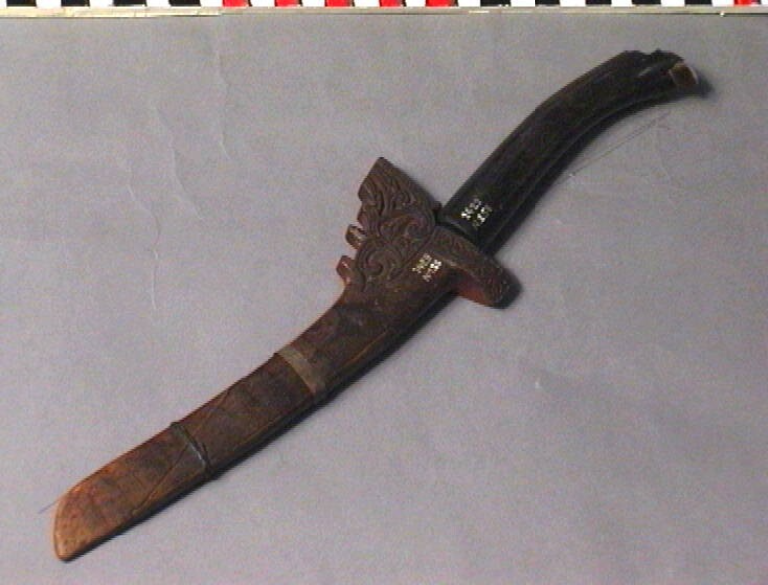
- A Peurawot from Aceh, 1904.
- Type: Knife
- Place of origin: Indonesia (Aceh)

Service history
- Used by: Acehnese people

Specifications
- Length: 28–35 cm (11–14 in)
- Blade type: Single edge
- Hilt type: Buffalo horn, wood, akar bahar
- Scabbard/sheath: Wood

Peurawot (also known as Porawet, Sikin Peurawot, Sikin Rawot) is a traditional whittling knife of the Acehnese people from Aceh, Indonesia.

== Description ==
The Peurawot has a single edge blade with a slight curvature. The width of the blade is about the same from the base to the tip of the blade. The blade does not have a central ridge and back of the blade is somewhat concave. The cutting edge of the blade is a little concave in shape. This knife is sometimes adorned with a golden or suasa sampa (decoration of the hilt near the blade) and tampo (knob of the hilt).

== See also ==
- Rencong
