= Flag of Batak =

Bonang Manalu
- ᯅᯬᯉᯰ ᯔᯉᯞᯮ
- Use: Ethnic flag
- Design: A horizontal tricolour of white, red, and black

The Flag of Batak is a tricolour flag consisting of the colours white, red, and black. The three colours, also known as Bonang Manalu (Toba Batak: ᯅᯬᯉᯰ ᯔᯉᯞᯮ, lit. 'Three Strings'), Sitolu Warna (ᯘᯪᯖᯬᯞᯮ ᯋᯒ᯲ᯉ, 'The Three Colours'), or Tiga Bolit (ᯖᯪᯎ ᯅᯬᯞᯪᯖ᯲, 'The Entangled Three'), are the main colours of the Batak people of North Sumatra, Indonesia.

The Bonang Manalu flag does not have a fixed pattern scheme. While the white, red, and black pattern is widely used, there are other accepted variants too:

White, red, and black.

Red, white, and black.

Black, white, and red.

== Colours and symbolism ==
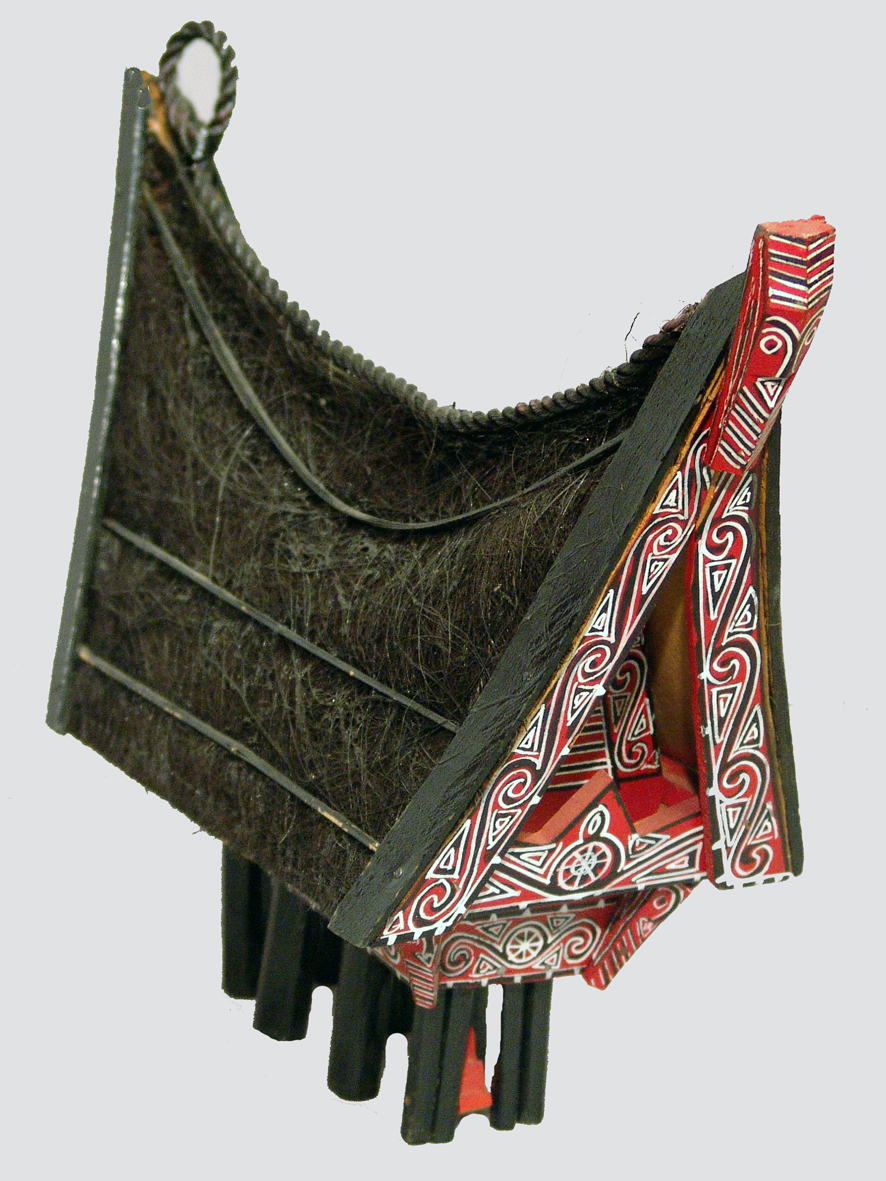
Model of a Batak house in gorga motifs with the bonang manalu colours

The Bonang Manalu colours is a prominent symbol and closely tied to Batak culture, they appear as the main colours in gorga motifs, ulos, and more. The colours has been interpreted as such:

- White represents purity, truth, and honesty
- Red represents bravery, solidarity, and unity
- Black represents strength, firmness, and leadership

The white-red-black variant of the Bonang Matalu is also an implementation of the values of Batak mythology:

- White representing the Upper World (Banua Ginjang) where Gods live
- Red representing the Middle World (Banua Tonga) where mortals live
- Black representing the Lower World (Banua Toru) where spirits and ghosts live

These colours can also be an interpretation of the day cycle: morning, noon, and night.

== Uses ==
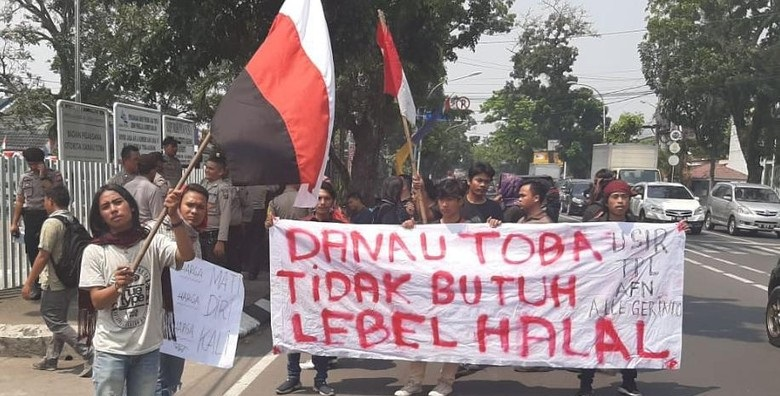
The Batak Flag at a protest.

The flag is used by the Batak people not as a symbol of separatism but a symbol of ethnic and cultural identity. The Bonang Manalu flag can be seen in sacred Batak places such as Pusuk Buhit.

== See also ==
- Flag of King Sisingamangaraja, another popular Batak ethnic flag
- Marawa Minangkabau, ethnic Minangkabau flag
- Alam Peudeueng, popular ethnic Acehnese flag
- Flags with similar color schemes:
  - Flag of Yemen
  - Flag of Egypt
  - Flag of the German Empire
  - Tino Rangatiratanga flag, a notable Māori flag
