= Reuncông =

Traditional dagger from Aceh, Indonesia

Rencong
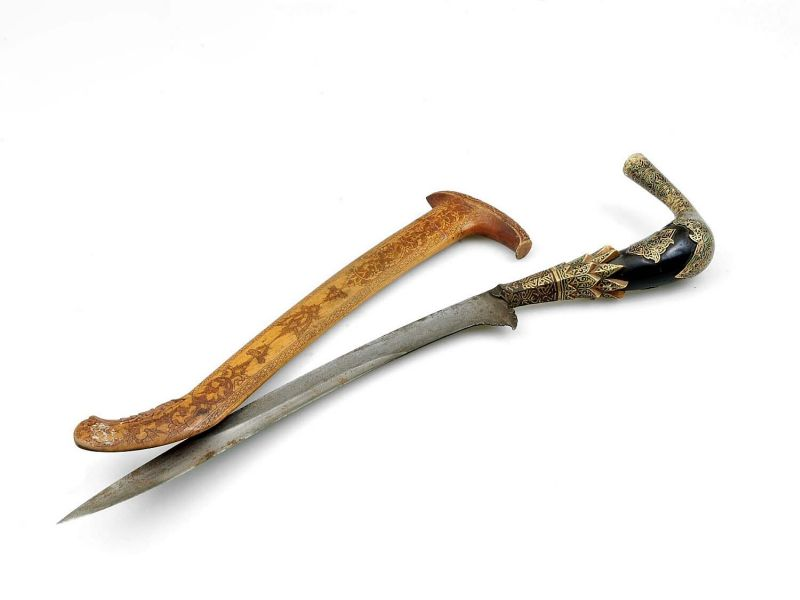
- Rencong with wooden scabbard and metal decorated handle, pre-1945.
- Type: Dagger
- Place of origin: Indonesia (Aceh)

Service history
- Used by: Acehnese

Specifications
- Length: 10–50 cm (3.9–19.7 in)
- Blade type: Single edge, slight concave grind
- Hilt type: Water buffalo horn, Ivory, bahar (Euplexaura sp) roots
- Scabbard/sheath: Water buffalo horn, Ivory, wood

The rencong, or renchong (Note: Acehnese: Reuncông (EBAYD) pronounced [rɯncoŋ], Reuntjông (Husaini), رنچوڠ (Jawoe), also called Rintjông; Indonesian: Rencong; Dutch: Rentjong) is a type of knife originating in Aceh, Indonesia. Originally a fighting weapon, it is most often seen today in the martial art of pencak silat and worn during traditional ceremonies.

== Description ==
The rencong is slightly L-shaped and has a sharp blade with a slightly convex back. The blade can vary in length from 10 to 50 cm (3.9 to 19.7 in). The blade can be straight or cranked like a kris. It is held in a scabbard of wood, ivory, horn, or sometimes even silver or gold. The rencong is worn on one's belt around the waist.

The design of a rencong depends largely on the social status of its owner. The most common type is made of brass or silver steel with a sheath of wood or buffalo horn. The rencong used by royalty is more ornate and less functional. Royal rencong have sheathes of ivory and blade made from gold, engraved with Quranic verses.

== Technique ==
Rencong technique is dependent on the weapon's size. Smaller lengths are favoured because they are more easily concealed. The rencong is worn on the left side and drawn with the left foot forward. A quick step forward with the right foot adds momentum to the thrust. It is then whipped to the right with a snap of the hand, bringing the palm upwards while the elbow is close to the body. The thrusting arm is almost fully extended and the palm is turned downward just before piercing the target. While the thrust is the primary method of attack, circular and elliptical slashing techniques exist as well. The main targets are the throat, kidneys, groin, and abdomen.

== Culture ==
Two rencongs can be seen in the coat of arms of Aceh as a symbol of heroism and the Acehnese culture.

In Acehnese culture, the rencong is considered sacred and should only be used in dire situations, as local folklore ascribes mystical attributes, supernatural powers, and religious symbolism to the rencong.

In the past, the rencong is often intertwined with the concept of jihad or religious struggle, where it would play significant roles in the struggle against the colonial forces. During Dutch colonial rule, Acehnese men and women of high status would often wear the rencong on the front side of the hip as a symbol of might, heroism, and prestige, as well as bravery during the fight against Dutch rule.

In modern times, the rencong is more often worn as part of traditional attire on ceremonial occasions as a symbol of strength and bravery, it also acts as the symbol and identity of the Acehnese and their culture, where the province of Aceh is also referred to as the "Land of Rencong".

== See also ==
- Kris
- Peurawot
- Sewar
- Weapons of silat
