= Flag of King Sisingamangaraja =

The replica of the Flag of Sisingamangaraja

The Flag of King Sisingamangaraja is the standard or banner used by the Sisingamangaraja dynasty during their long reign over Bakkara and over the territories around Lake Toba. The flag can be found in places such as the Tomb of Sisingamangaraja in Balige and also in the Sisingamangaraja Memorial in Tarutung, however the flags in these places are mere replicas, as the original banner was taken by Hans Christoffel, a Dutch captain sent to kill Sisingamangaraja XII. Today the original banner can be found in the Aan de Stroom Museum, Belgium.

== Symbolism ==
The banner consists of several elements, each with their own philosophy, being:

1. The colour white represents purity in spirit (partondi hamalimon)
2. The colour red represents upholding truth and justice (parsinabul di habonaran)
3. The double-edged sword or Piso Gaja Dompak represents freeing the bounded and literate the oppressed (sirungnungi na dapot bubu)
4. The eight-pointed star or wolu desa naualu represents the eight directions, meaning support from all sides.
5. The white circle or mataniari sidompahon represents the descendants of Guru Tatea Bulan

== Influences ==
The banner is influenced by the Zulfiqar flag of the Aceh Sultanate. The Zulfiqar flag is a flag which features the Zulfiqar, an Islamic double-bladed sword popular in the Middle East region, the flag was used and popularised in the Southeast Asian region by the Aceh Sultanate, it was originally used as a sign of submission to the Ottoman Caliphate.

== Contemporary uses ==
Today, the usage of the standard can be seen in governmental buildings in North Sumatra. The standard has also been adopted to be the symbol of a few educational institutions such as the University of Sisingamangaraja XII Medan, University of Sisingamangaraja XII Tapanuli and STMIK Sisingamangaraja XII.

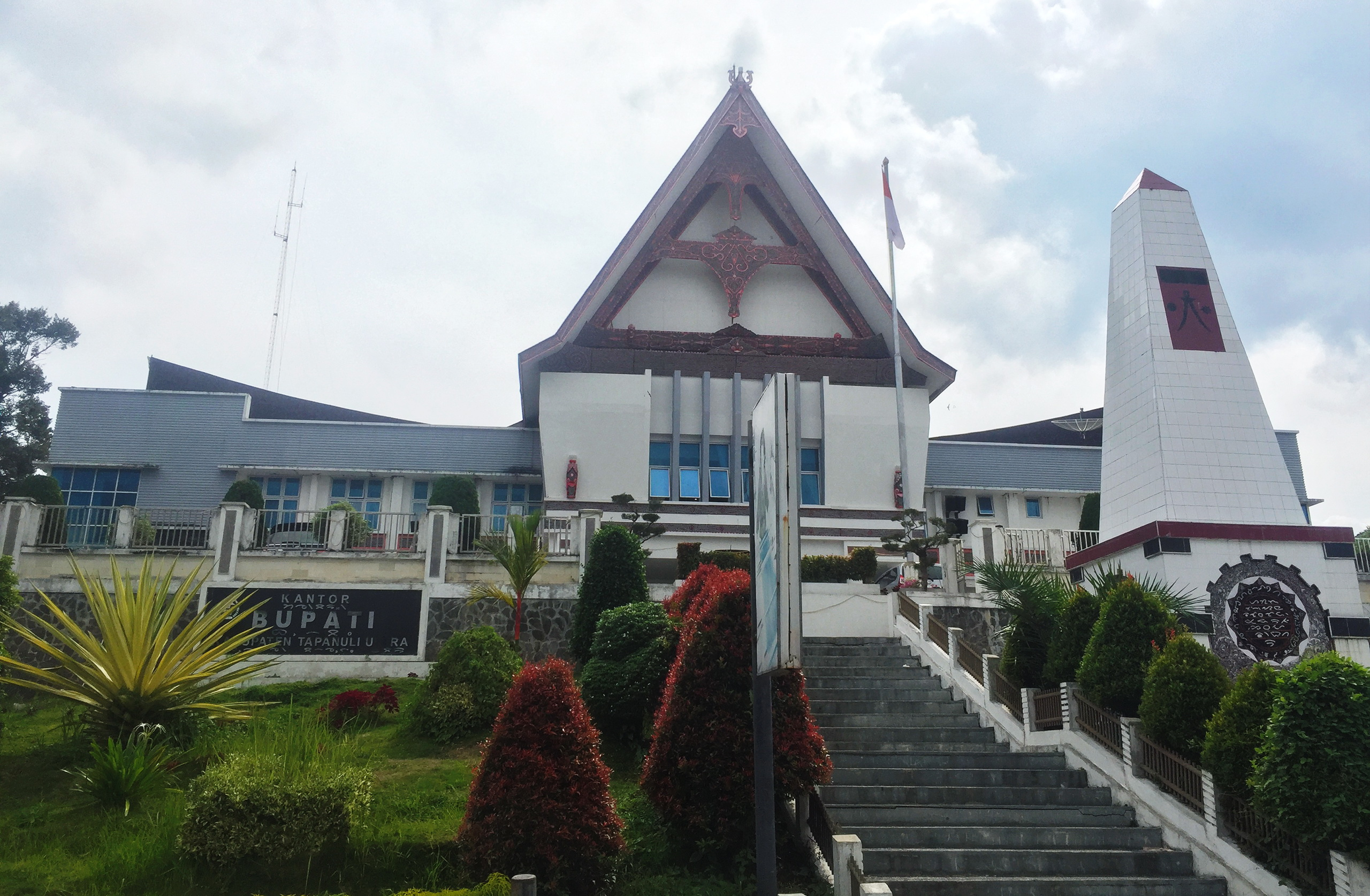
The standard of Sisingamangaraja in front of a governmental building in North Tapanuli.

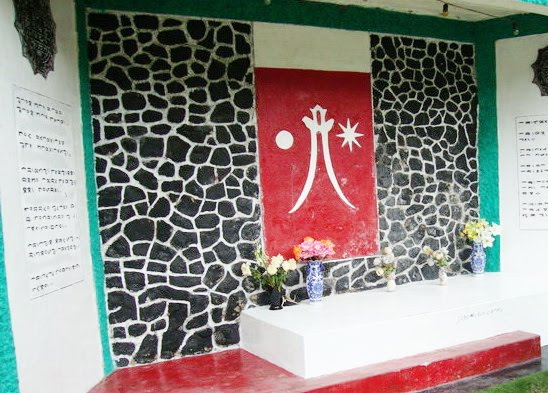
The banner on the grave of Sisingamangaraja XII in Balige
